= MP Motorsport =

Dutch auto racing team

(Netherlands) MP Motorsport
- Founded: 1995
- Base: Westmaas, Netherlands
- Team principal(s): Sander Dorsman
- Founder(s): Cock Kool
- Current series: FIA Formula 2 Championship; FIA Formula 3 Championship; Formula Regional European Championship; Eurocup-3; F4 Spanish Championship; F1 Academy; FIA European Karting Championship; Division 1 Superkarts
- Former series: GP2 Series; 24H GT Series; Formula 4 UAE Championship; Formula Renault 2.0 Netherlands; Dutch Formula Ford; Auto GP; V de V Challenge Monoplace; GP3 Series; SMP F4 Championship; Eurocup Formula Renault 2.0; F3 Asian Championship; Supercar Challenge
- Current drivers: FIA Formula 2 (Italy) 9. Gabriele Minì (Germany) 10. Oliver Goethe; FIA Formula 3 (France) Alessandro Giusti (Argentina) Mattia Colnaghi (Finland) Tuukka Taponen; Formula Regional European Championship (Kazakhstan) Alexander Abkhazava (Italy) Zhenrui Chi (United States) Sebastian Wheldon; Eurocup-3 (Belgium) Ean Eyckmans (Brazil) Alceu Feldmann Neto (Netherlands) René Lammers (Australia) Gianmarco Pradel; F4 Spanish Championship (Netherlands) Felipe Reijs (Canada) Jensen Burnett (Poland) Borys Łyżeń (Netherlands) Rocco Coronel (Netherlands) Louis Cochet (Netherlands) Kasper Schormans; F1 Academy (Netherlands) Esmee Kosterman (Denmark) Alba Hurup Larsen (Netherlands) Nina Gademan
- Teams' Championships: F4 Spanish Championship: 2016, 2017-2018, 2020 - 2023; FIA Formula 2 Championship: 2022; Eurocup-3: 2024, 2025
- Drivers' Championships: Dutch Formula Ford season: 2000: Patrick Koel; 2002: Jaap van Lagen; SMP F4 Championship: 2016: Richard Verschoor; 2017: Christian Lundgaard; F4 Spanish Championship: 2016: Richard Verschoor; 2017: Christian Lundgaard; 2018: Amaury Cordeel; 2020: Kas Haverkort; 2021: Dilano van 't Hoff; Eurocup-3: 2025: Mattia Colnaghi; FIA Formula 2 Championship: 2022: Felipe Drugovich
- Website: http://mpmotorsport.com/

MP Motorsport is a Dutch auto racing team currently competing in the FIA Formula 2 Championship, FIA Formula 3 Championship, Eurocup-3, Spanish Formula 4 Championship and the newly established F1 Academy in 2023. The team has also participated in Formula Regional European Championship by Alpine, Auto GP, Eurocup Formula Renault 2.0 and Formula Renault 2.0 Northern European Cup in conjunction with Manor Competition, using the name Manor MP Motorsport in the past.

== Background ==
MP Motorsport were founded in 1995 by Cock Kool as MultiPromo for his son Ferdinand and Mervyn Kool to race in karts. The squad competed in local Benelux and Dutch Formula Ford championships.

In 2003, the team joined Formula Renault 2.0 series, competing in Eurocup and Benelux championships. In 2008 MP Motorsport entered the EUROCUP Formula Renault 2.0 series and made an immediate impact when Paul Meijer won at the team's debut in the Series at Spa Francorchamps

In 2011, MP Motorsport graduated to Auto GP. For the next year the team joined forces with Manor Competition in Auto GP World Series, Eurocup Formula Renault 2.0 and Formula Renault 2.0 Northern European Cup.

MP Motorsport joined GP2 Series in 2013, replacing Scuderia Coloni. 2012 Auto GP World Series champion Adrian Quaife-Hobbs signed with the team alongside Daniël de Jong, who raced for Manor MP Motorsport in the Auto GP World Series and Rapax in the GP2 Series throughout the 2012 season. MP achieved their first podium at the GP2 sprint race in Monaco, with Quaife-Hobbs finishing second behind race winner Stefano Coletti from Rapax.

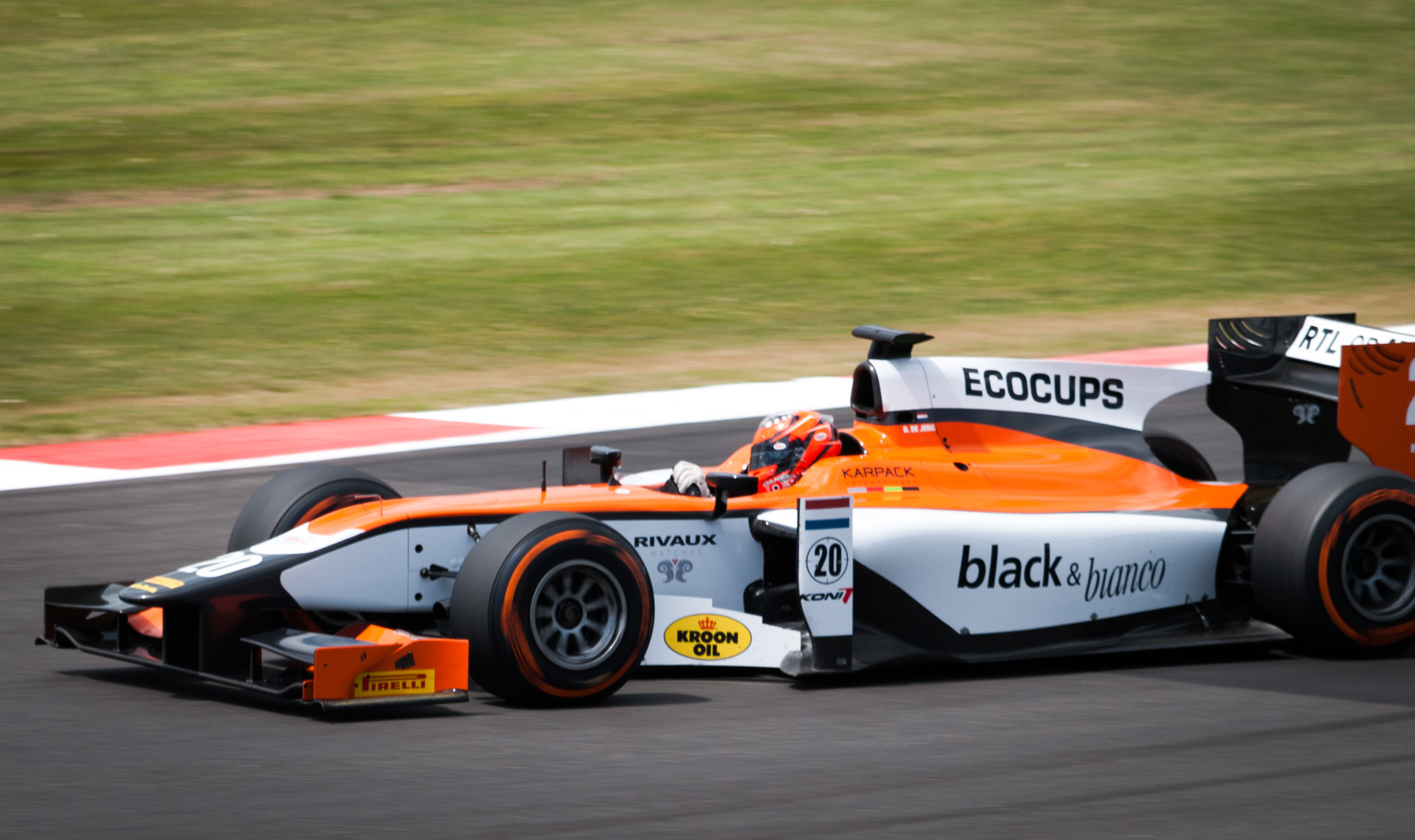
Daniël de Jong, driving for MP Motorsport during GP2 Series race at Silverstone in 2014

The team took their first GP2 victory in 2014, when Marco Sorensen won the sprint race in Sochi despite a late challenge from both Stoffel Vandoorne and Felipe Nasr.

After an uneventful 2015 season (with the exception of a podium from Sergio Canamasas in the Monaco feature race), the team achieved its highest points scoring place in the constructor's championship in the 2016 season, mostly from the performances of Oliver Rowland. The team also partook in the SMP F4 and Spanish F4 championships, with Red Bull Junior Richard Verschoor claiming both titles with the team and Jarno Opmeer finishing SMP F4 vice-champion.

In November 2016, it was announced MP would go into the 2017 season with Sérgio Sette Câmara. In February 2017, Jordan King joined the team. In 2017, MP also made its return to the Eurocup Formula Renault 2.0 championship, fielding Verschoor, Opmeer and new Red Bull Junior Neil Verhagen. For the SMP F4 Championship, MP signed Tristan Charpentier, Lukas Dunner, Bent Viscaal and Renault Sport Academy driver Christian Lundgaard, with Lundgaard claiming the title at the Moscow Raceway. The team also contested the Spanish F4 Championship with Lundgaard, Dunner, Viscaal and other Renault junior Marta García.

The team remained in Formula 2, signing Ralph Boschung and Roberto Merhi as their drivers. In 2018, the team expanded to the GP3 Series, replacing DAMS. For the inaugural campaign they signed with Dorian Boccolacci and Niko Kari. They were accompanied by Will Palmer in the first round. Max Defourny, Christian Lundgaard and Alex Peroni will join the squad in the Eurocup Formula Renault 2.0. Isac Blomqvist, Amaury Cordeel and Patrick Schott represented the team in the 2018 SMP F4 Championship and 2018 F4 Spanish Championship, with Cordeel claiming the latter title.

In 2019, the team signed Cordeel, Lorenzo Colombo and Renault junior Victor Martins for their Formula Renault Eurocup campaign and stayed on in the newly rebranded FIA Formula 3 Championship, fielding Richard Verschoor, Simo Laaksonen and Red Bull Junior Liam Lawson. For the Spanish F4 Championship, MP signed championship returnee Rafael Villanueva, Jr. and acquired karting graduate Nicolas Baert, UAE F4 race winner Tijmen van der Helm and KNAF-backed racer Glenn van Berlo. In the FIA Formula 2 Championship, the team fielded Jordan King and Mahaveer Raghunathan. Raghunathan would provide for very erratic and sometimes dangerous driving, which culminated in him collecting 24 penalty points throughout the whole year.

For 2022, the team signed their former Felipe Drugovich alongside Clément Novalak, with Drugovich winning the Drivers' title and the team taking their first Formula 2 Teams' title.

== Current series results ==
=== FIA Formula 2 Championship ===
Year	Chassis	Engine	Tyres	Drivers	Races	Wins	Poles	F. Laps	Podiums	D.C.	Pts	T.C.	Pts
2017	Dallara; GP2/11	Mecachrome; V8108 V8	P	(Brazil) Sérgio Sette Câmara	22	1	0	1	2	12th	47	6th	109
2017	Dallara; GP2/11	Mecachrome; V8108 V8	P	(United Kingdom) Jordan King	22	0	0	3	0	11th	62	6th	109
2018	Dallara; F2 2018	Mecachrome; V634T V6 t	P	(Spain) Roberto Merhi	15	0	0	0	1	12th	41 (Note: Points scored whilst racing for MP Motorsport. Merhi scored 20 points for other teams.)	8th	61
2018	Dallara; F2 2018	Mecachrome; V634T V6 t	P	(France) Dorian Boccolacci	8	0	0	0	0	21st	3	8th	61
2018	Dallara; F2 2018	Mecachrome; V634T V6 t	P	(Switzerland) Ralph Boschung	20	0	0	2	0	18th	17	8th	61
2018	Dallara; F2 2018	Mecachrome; V634T V6 t	P	(Finland) Niko Kari	4	0	0	0	0	24th	0	8th	61
2019	Dallara; F2 2018	Mecachrome; V634T V6 t	P	(United Kingdom) Jordan King	20	0	0	2	2	9th	79	7th	96
2019	Dallara; F2 2018	Mecachrome; V634T V6 t	P	(Russia) Artem Markelov	2	0	0	0	0	16th	16	7th	96
2019	Dallara; F2 2018	Mecachrome; V634T V6 t	P	(Netherlands) Mahaveer Raghunathan	20	0	0	0	0	20th	1	7th	96
2019	Dallara; F2 2018	Mecachrome; V634T V6 t	P	(United States) Patricio O'Ward	2	0	0	0	0	26th	0	7th	96
2020	Dallara; F2 2018	Mecachrome; V634T V6 t	P	(Japan) Nobuharu Matsushita	17	1	0	1	1	15th	42	6th	167
2020	Dallara; F2 2018	Mecachrome; V634T V6 t	P	(France) Giuliano Alesi	6	0	0	0	0	17th	4 (Note: Points scored whilst racing for MP Motorsport. Alesi scored 8 points for other teams.)	6th	167
2020	Dallara; F2 2018	Mecachrome; V634T V6 t	P	(Brazil) Felipe Drugovich	24	3	1	1	4	9th	121	6th	167
2021	Dallara; F2 2018	Mecachrome; V634T V6 t	P	(Netherlands) Richard Verschoor	17	1	0	0	1	11th	55 (Note: Points scored whilst racing for MP Motorsport. Verschoor scored 1 point for other teams.)	6th	75
2021	Dallara; F2 2018	Mecachrome; V634T V6 t	P	(Australia) Jack Doohan	6	0	0	0	0	19th	7	6th	75
2021	Dallara; F2 2018	Mecachrome; V634T V6 t	P	(Germany) Lirim Zendeli	17	0	0	1	0	17th	13	6th	75
2021	Dallara; F2 2018	Mecachrome; V634T V6 t	P	(France) Clément Novalak	6	0	0	0	0	28th	0	6th	75
2022	Dallara; F2 2018	Mecachrome; V634T V6 t	P	(Brazil) Felipe Drugovich	28	5	4	4	11	**1st**	**265**	1st	305
2022	Dallara; F2 2018	Mecachrome; V634T V6 t	P	(France) Clément Novalak	28	0	0	1	1	14th	40	1st	305
2023	Dallara; F2 2018	Mecachrome; V634T V6 t	P	(Norway) Dennis Hauger	26	2	0	1	4	8th	113	6th	172
2023	Dallara; F2 2018	Mecachrome; V634T V6 t	P	(India) Jehan Daruvala	24	0	0	0	3	12th	59	6th	172
2023	Dallara; F2 2018	Mecachrome; V634T V6 t	P	(Argentina) Franco Colapinto	2	0	0	0	0	25th	0	6th	172
2024	Dallara; F2 2024	Mecachrome; V634T V6 t	P	(Norway) Dennis Hauger	24	1	2	2	5	11th	85.5	3rd	220.5
2024	Dallara; F2 2024	Mecachrome; V634T V6 t	P	(Netherlands) Richard Verschoor	4	0	0	2	2	8th	25 (Note: Points scored whilst racing for MP Motorsport. Verschoor scored 81 points for other teams.)	3rd	220.5
2024	Dallara; F2 2024	Mecachrome; V634T V6 t	P	(Argentina) Franco Colapinto	20	1	0	3	3	9th	96	3rd	220.5
2024	Dallara; F2 2024	Mecachrome; V634T V6 t	P	(Germany) Oliver Goethe	8	0	0	0	0	23rd	14	3rd	220.5
2025	Dallara; F2 2024	Mecachrome; V634T V6 t	P	(Germany) Oliver Goethe	27	0	0	2	0	15th	37	5th	207
2025	Dallara; F2 2024	Mecachrome; V634T V6 t	P	(Netherlands) Richard Verschoor	27	4	0	3	6	**3rd**	**170**	5th	207
2026	Dallara; F2 2024	Mecachrome; V634T V6 t	P	(Italy) Gabriele Minì	25	2	0	0	9	4th	163	4th	200*
2026	Dallara; F2 2024	Mecachrome; V634T V6 t	P	(Germany) Oliver Goethe	25	0	0	1	2	15th	37	4th	200*

* Season still in progress.

==== In detail ====
(key)

Year	Drivers	1	2	3	4	5	6	7	8	9	10	11	12	13	14	15	16	17	18	19	20	21	22	23	24	25	26	27	28	29	T.C.	Points
2017		BHR; FEA	BHR; SPR	CAT; FEA	CAT; SPR	MON; FEA	MON; SPR	BAK; FEA	BAK; SPR	RBR; FEA	RBR; SPR	SIL; FEA	SIL; SPR	HUN; FEA	HUN; SPR	SPA; FEA	SPA; SPR	MNZ; FEA	MNZ; SPR	JER; FEA	JER; SPR	YMC; FEA	YMC; SPR								6th	109
2017	(Brazil) Sérgio Sette Câmara	13	18^{F}	14	15	Ret	14	13	9	16	10	13	15	16	13	6	1	6	2	10	14	9	8								6th	109
2017	(United Kingdom) Jordan King	4	5	9	5	9	8	6	DSQ	9	6	7	Ret	15	11	Ret	14^{F}	10	20^{F}	6	Ret	8	Ret^{F}								6th	109
2018		BHR; FEA	BHR; SPR	BAK; FEA	BAK; SPR	CAT; FEA	CAT; SPR	MON; FEA	MON; SPR	LEC; FEA	LEC; SPR	RBR; FEA	RBR; SPR	SIL; FEA	SIL; SPR	HUN; FEA	HUN; SPR	SPA; FEA	SPA; SPR	MNZ; FEA	MNZ; SPR	SOC; FEA	SOC; SPR	YMC; FEA	YMC; SPR						8th	61
2018	(Spain) Roberto Merhi	DNS	11	8	7	13	Ret	3	7	DSQ	15	4	16	11	9	11	5														8th	61
2018	(France) Dorian Boccolacci																	15	18	Ret	7	13	8	12	11						8th	61
2018	(Switzerland) Ralph Boschung	10	7	7	8	Ret	Ret	Ret	Ret	Ret	16^{F}	Ret	15	9	8	18^{F}	Ret	Ret	12	8	Ret										8th	61
2018	(Finland) Niko Kari																					Ret	Ret	15	Ret						8th	61
2019		BHR; FEA	BHR; SPR	BAK; FEA	BAK; SPR	CAT; FEA	CAT; SPR	MON; FEA	MON; SPR	LEC; FEA	LEC; SPR	RBR; FEA	RBR; SPR	SIL; FEA	SIL; SPR	HUN; FEA	HUN; SPR	SPA; FEA	SPA; SPR	MNZ; FEA	MNZ; SPR	SOC; FEA	SOC; SPR	YMC; FEA	YMC; SPR						7th	96
2019	(United Kingdom) Jordan King	17	8	3	Ret	7^{F}	7			6	11	8	7	10	9	6^{F}	4	C	C	6	2	12	9	12	9						7th	96
2019	(Russia) Artem Markelov							6	4																						7th	96
2019	(Netherlands) Mahaveer Raghunathan	18	19	11	13	16	19	15	Ret	12	18	EX	EX	15	18	17	19	C	C	10	13	17	17	Ret	15						7th	96
2019	(United States) Patricio O'Ward											19	14																		7th	96
2020		RBR; FEA	RBR; SPR	RBR; FEA	RBR; SPR	HUN; FEA	HUN; SPR	SIL; FEA	SIL; SPR	SIL; FEA	SIL; SPR	CAT; FEA	CAT; SPR	SPA; FEA	SPA; SPR	MNZ; FEA	MNZ; SPR	MUG; FEA	MUG; SPR	SOC; FEA	SOC; SPR	BHR; FEA	BHR; SPR	BHR; FEA	BHR; SPR						6th	167
2020	(Japan) Nobuharu Matsushita	9	6	17	11	12	11	10	7	11	18	1^{F}	5	Ret	DNS	15	11	11	14												6th	167
2020	(France) Giuliano Alesi																			14	16	17	13	15	6						6th	167
2020	(Brazil) Felipe Drugovich	8	1^{F}	13	13	5	16	7^{P}	6	10	12	7	1	DSQ	13	16	Ret	4	15	Ret	20	1	8	3	8						6th	167
2021		BHR; SP1	BHR; SP2	BHR; FEA	MON; SP1	MON; SP2	MON; FEA	BAK; SP1	BAK; SP2	BAK; FEA	SIL; SP1	SIL; SP2	SIL; FEA	MNZ; SP1	MNZ; SP2	MNZ; FEA	SOC; SP1	SOC; SP2	SOC; FEA	JED; SP1	JED; SP2	JED; FEA	YMC; SP1	YMC; SP2	YMC; FEA						6th	75
2021	(Netherlands) Richard Verschoor	Ret	5	4	13	6	10	12	Ret	14	10	1	4	Ret	13	DSQ	8	C	8												6th	75
2021	(Australia) Jack Doohan																			11	5	13	11	8	Ret						6th	75
2021	(Germany) Lirim Zendeli	9^{F}	Ret	18	15	7	Ret	13	Ret	10	11	9	9	15†	12	7	10	C	16												6th	75
2021	(France) Clément Novalak																			14	Ret	19	17	14	14						6th	75
2022		BHR; SPR	BHR; FEA	JED; SPR	JED; FEA	IMO; SPR	IMO; FEA	CAT; SPR	CAT; FEA	MON; SPR	MON; FEA	BAK; SPR	BAK; FEA	SIL; SPR	SIL; FEA	RBR; SPR	RBR; FEA	LEC; SPR	LEC; FEA	HUN; SPR	HUN; FEA	SPA; SPR	SPA; FEA	ZAN; SPR	ZAN; FEA	MNZ; SPR	MNZ; FEA	YMC; SPR	YMC; FEA		1st	305
2022	(Brazil) Felipe Drugovich	5	6	3	1^{P}	5	10	1^{F}	1	Ret	1^{P}	5	3	5	4	4^{F}	11	3	4^{F}	4	9	4	2^{P}	10^{F}	1^{P}	Ret	6	3	2		1st	305
2022	(France) Clément Novalak	18	Ret	11	14	19	4	14	5	Ret	Ret	14	Ret	13	13	15	17	17	8	20	12	17	9	2	Ret	Ret	8	14	12^{F}		1st	305
2023		BHR; SPR	BHR; FEA	JED; SPR	JED; FEA	ALB; SPR	ALB; FEA	BAK; SPR	BAK; FEA	MCO; SPR	MCO; FEA	CAT; SPR	CAT; FEA	RBR; SPR	RBR; FEA	SIL; SPR	SIL; FEA	HUN; SPR	HUN; FEA	SPA; SPR	SPA; FEA	ZAN; SPR	ZAN; FEA	MNZ; SPR	MNZ; FEA	YMC; SPR	YMC; FEA				6th	172
2023	(Norway) Dennis Hauger	2	Ret	8	5	1^{F}	19†	12†	6	15	5	4	8	6	11	12	14	1	7	3	DSQ	9	5	12	5	4	7				6th	172
2023	(India) Jehan Daruvala	6	17	3	3	17	6	14†	14	2	13	19†	14	Ret	10	11	6	5	11	Ret	Ret	10	17	17	7						6th	172
2023	(Argentina) Franco Colapinto																									19	Ret				6th	172
2024		BHR; SPR	BHR; FEA	JED; SPR	JED; FEA	ALB; SPR	ALB; FEA	IMO; SPR	IMO; FEA	MCO; SPR	MCO; FEA	CAT; SPR	CAT; FEA	RBR; SPR	RBR; FEA	SIL; SPR	SIL; FEA	HUN; SPR	HUN; FEA	SPA; SPR	SPA; FEA	MNZ; SPR	MNZ; FEA	BAK; SPR	BAK; FEA	LUS; SPR	LUS; FEA	YMC; SPR	YMC; FEA		3rd	220.5
2024	(Norway) Dennis Hauger	8	8^{F}	1	3	2	Ret^{P}	Ret	12	3	6^{F}	12	Ret	5	12^{P}	7	9	4	6	2	12	8	Ret	14	9						3rd	220.5
2024	(Netherlands) Richard Verschoor																									3^{F}	17	7	3^{F}		3rd	220.5
2024	(Argentina) Franco Colapinto	18	6	11	Ret	4	DSQ	1^{F}	5	5	13	18	2	11	2^{F}	5	4^{F}	5	13	8	Ret										3rd	220.5
2024	(Germany) Oliver Goethe																					Ret	16	21	Ret	Ret	4	9	9		3rd	220.5
2025		ALB; SPR	ALB; FEA	BHR; SPR	BHR; FEA	JED; SPR	JED; FEA	IMO; SPR	IMO; FEA	MCO; SPR	MCO; FEA	CAT; SPR	CAT; FEA	RBR; SPR	RBR; FEA	SIL; SPR	SIL; FEA	SPA; SPR	SPA; FEA	HUN; SPR	HUN; FEA	MNZ; SPR	MNZ; FEA	BAK; SPR	BAK; FEA	LUS; SPR	LUS; FEA	YMC; SPR	YMC; FEA		5th	207
2025	(Germany) Oliver Goethe	11	C	4	11	11	14	10	7	12	10	18	16	11	17†	11	11	4	13	7	8	18^{F}	16^{F}	Ret	12	14	Ret	5	5		5th	207
2025	(Netherlands) Richard Verschoor	4	C	2	6	4^{F}	1^{F}	22†	9	5	Ret	1	3	4	1	7	7	Ret	18	6	5	4	8	6	8	1^{F}	6	11	13		5th	207
2026		ALB; SPR	ALB; FEA	MIA; SPR	MIA; FEA	MTL; SPR	MTL; FEA	MCO; SPR	MCO; FEA	CAT; SPR	CAT; FEA	RBR; SPR	RBR; FEA	SIL; SPR	SIL; FEA	SPA; SPR	SPA; FEA	HUN; SPR	HUN; FEA	MNZ; SPR	MNZ; FEA	MAD; SPR	MAD; FEA	BAK; SPR	BAK; FE1	BAK; FE2	LUS; SPR	LUS; FEA	YAS; SPR	YAS; FEA	4th	200*
2026	(Italy) Gabriele Minì	6	8	7	1	2	3	3	11	2	3	5	2	2	6	Ret	5	1	9	10	11	9	7	14	6	9					4th	200*
2026	(Germany) Oliver Goethe	18	4	11	Ret	10	15†	Ret	14	11	Ret	Ret	3^{F}	16	18	8	Ret	12	18	3	9	12	Ret	16	14	11					4th	200*

* Season still in progress.

=== FIA Formula 3 Championship ===
Year	Chassis	Engine	Tyres	Drivers	Races	Wins	Poles	F. Laps	Podiums	D.C.	Pts	T.C.	Pts
2019	Dallara; F3 2019	Mecachrome; V634 V6	P	(New Zealand) Liam Lawson	16	0	0	0	2	11th	41	6th	77
2019	Dallara; F3 2019	Mecachrome; V634 V6	P	(Finland) Simo Laaksonen	16	0	0	0	0	23rd	2	6th	77
2019	Dallara; F3 2019	Mecachrome; V634 V6	P	(Netherlands) Richard Verschoor	16	0	0	0	0	13th	34	6th	77
2020	Dallara; F3 2019	Mecachrome; V634 V6	P	(Netherlands) Richard Verschoor	18	0	0	0	1	9th	69	6th	109
2020	Dallara; F3 2019	Mecachrome; V634 V6	P	(Netherlands) Bent Viscaal	18	1	0	1	2	13th	40	6th	109
2020	Dallara; F3 2019	Mecachrome; V634 V6	P	(Austria) Lukas Dunner	18	0	0	0	0	27th	0	6th	109
2021	Dallara; F3 2019	Mecachrome; V634 V6	P	(France) Victor Martins	20	1	0	4	6	5th	131	4th	224
2021	Dallara; F3 2019	Mecachrome; V634 V6	P	(Brazil) Caio Collet	20	0	0	0	2	9th	93	4th	224
2021	Dallara; F3 2019	Mecachrome; V634 V6	P	(Netherlands) Tijmen van der Helm	20	0	0	0	0	26th	0	4th	224
2022	Dallara; F3 2019	Mecachrome; V634 V6	P	(Brazil) Caio Collet	18	2	1	2	5	8th	88	4th	195
2022	Dallara; F3 2019	Mecachrome; V634 V6	P	Alexander Smolyar	16	1	2	1	3	10th	76	4th	195
2022	Dallara; F3 2019	Mecachrome; V634 V6	P	(Romania) Filip Ugran	2	0	0	0	0	36th	0	4th	195
2022	Dallara; F3 2019	Mecachrome; V634 V6	P	(India) Kush Maini	18	0	0	0	1	14th	31	4th	195
2023	Dallara; F3 2019	Mecachrome; V634 V6	P	(Argentina) Franco Colapinto	18	2	0	0	5	4th	110	3rd	194
2023	Dallara; F3 2019	Mecachrome; V634 V6	P	(Spain) Mari Boya	18	0	0	0	1	17th	29	3rd	194
2023	Dallara; F3 2019	Mecachrome; V634 V6	P	(United Kingdom) Jonny Edgar	18	1	0	0	1	13th	55	3rd	194
2024	Dallara; F3 2019	Mecachrome; V634 V6	P	(Germany) Tim Tramnitz	20	1	0	0	4	9th	81	6th	137
2024	Dallara; F3 2019	Mecachrome; V634 V6	P	(Poland) Kacper Sztuka	20	0	0	0	0	27th	6	6th	137
2024	Dallara; F3 2019	Mecachrome; V634 V6	P	(Republic of Ireland) Alex Dunne	20	0	0	0	2	14th	50	6th	137
2025	Dallara; F3 2025	Mecachrome; V634 V6	P	(Germany) Tim Tramnitz	19	1	0	0	3	4th	94	3rd	177
2025	Dallara; F3 2025	Mecachrome; V634 V6	P	(Spain) Bruno del Pino	19	0	0	0	1	23rd	16	3rd	177
2025	Dallara; F3 2025	Mecachrome; V634 V6	P	(France) Alessandro Giusti	19	0	0	1	2	10th	67	3rd	177
2026	Dallara; F3 2025	Mecachrome; V634 V6	P	(Argentina) Mattia Colnaghi	19	0	0	0	0	13th	54	3rd	208
2026	Dallara; F3 2025	Mecachrome; V634 V6	P	(Finland) Tuukka Taponen	19	1	2	3	3	**3rd**	**109**	3rd	208
2026	Dallara; F3 2025	Mecachrome; V634 V6	P	(France) Alessandro Giusti	19	0	0	0	0	15th	45	3rd	208

==== In detail ====
(key)

Year	Drivers	1	2	3	4	5	6	7	8	9	10	11	12	13	14	15	16	17	18	19	20	21	T.C.	Points
2019		CAT; FEA	CAT; SPR	LEC; FEA	LEC; SPR	RBR; FEA	RBR; SPR	SIL; FEA	SIL; SPR	HUN; FEA	HUN; SPR	SPA; FEA	SPA; SPR	MNZ; FEA	MNZ; SPR	SOC; FEA	SOC; SPR						6th	77
2019	(New Zealand) Liam Lawson	NC	17	9	5	14	25	8	3	16	9	12	19	7	2	18	8						6th	77
2019	(Finland) Simo Laaksonen	9	Ret	20†	Ret	18	18	24	24	17	18	24	Ret	20	20	17	Ret						6th	77
2019	(Netherlands) Richard Verschoor	19	19	14	4	10	12	17	21	27†	17	17	11	4	4	10	7						6th	77
2020		RBR; FEA	RBR; SPR	RBR; FEA	RBR; SPR	HUN; FEA	HUN; SPR	SIL; FEA	SIL; SPR	SIL; FEA	SIL; SPR	CAT; FEA	CAT; SPR	SPA; FEA	SPA; SPR	MNZ; FEA	MNZ; SPR	MUG; FEA	MUG; SPR				6th	109
2020	(Netherlands) Richard Verschoor	8	2	7	4	4	5	11	9	19	18	9	4	10	7	27	10	12	5				6th	109
2020	(Netherlands) Bent Viscaal	11	11	20	16	3	17	Ret	16	8	1^{F}	Ret	20	23	16	8	DSQ	Ret	20				6th	109
2020	(Austria) Lukas Dunner	24	14	16	18	12	Ret	Ret	22	23	Ret	21	22	21	13	14	Ret	21	17				6th	109
2021		CAT; SP1	CAT; SP2	CAT; FEA	LEC; SP1	LEC; SP2	LEC; FEA	RBR; SP1	RBR; SP2	RBR; FEA	HUN; SP1	HUN; SP2	HUN; FEA	SPA; SP1	SPA; SP2	SPA; FEA	ZAN; SP1	ZAN; SP2	ZAN; FEA	SOC; SP1	SOC; SP2	SOC; FEA	4th	224
2021	(France) Victor Martins	9	2	5	2	3^{F}	4	5	26†	24^{F}	15	25	27	5	7	2^{F}	8	1^{F}	10	3	C	8	4th	224
2021	(Brazil) Caio Collet	3	5	8	13	Ret	3	17	17	7	20	12	16	9	4	4	5	4	5	5	C	Ret	4th	224
2021	(Netherlands) Tijmen van der Helm	21	15	20	29	18	16	13	Ret	20	21	15	19	23	16	22	21	21	29†	Ret	C	18	4th	224
2022		BHR; SPR	BHR; FEA	IMO; SPR	IMO; FEA	CAT; SPR	CAT; FEA	SIL; SPR	SIL; FEA	RBR; SPR	RBR; FEA	HUN; SPR	HUN; FEA	SPA; SPR	SPA; FEA	ZAN; SPR	ZAN; FEA	MNZ; SPR	MNZ; FEA				4th	195
2022	(Brazil) Caio Collet	7	Ret	24†	11	3	7	11	4	2	27	1^{F}	9	10	6^{P}	1^{F}	7	3	20				4th	195
2022	Alexander Smolyar	3	23	8	14	6	4			9	7	15	1^{P}	3	9	14	10	25^{F}	27†^{P}				4th	195
2022	(Romania) Filip Ugran							23	19														4th	195
2022	(India) Kush Maini	15	16	20	5	17	25	4	20	19	25†	3	7	13	Ret	18	11	11	13				4th	195
2023		BHR; SPR	BHR; FEA	ALB; SPR	ALB; FEA	MCO; SPR	MCO; FEA	CAT; SPR	CAT; FEA	RBR; SPR	RBR; FEA	SIL; SPR	SIL; FEA	HUN; SPR	HUN; FEA	SPA; SPR	SPA; FEA	MNZ; SPR	MNZ; FEA				3rd	194
2023	(Argentina) Franco Colapinto	2	10	DSQ	Ret	4	6	6	2	13	4	1	8	7	3	5	10	1	Ret				3rd	194
2023	(Spain) Mari Boya	15	Ret	DSQ	Ret	Ret	18	7	6	12	24	29	12	21	10	16	13	3	6				3rd	194
2023	(United Kingdom) Jonny Edgar	9	23	DSQ	11	Ret	14	12	15	5	6	28	NC	8	8	4	19	Ret	1				3rd	194
2024		BHR; SPR	BHR; FEA	ALB; SPR	ALB; FEA	IMO; SPR	IMO; FEA	MCO; SPR	MCO; FEA	CAT; SPR	CAT; FEA	RBR; SPR	RBR; FEA	SIL; SPR	SIL; FEA	HUN; SPR	HUN; FEA	SPA; SPR	SPA; FEA	MNZ; SPR	MNZ; FEA		6th	137
2024	(Germany) Tim Tramnitz	5	3	12	15	2	11	2	8	10	11	8	15	25	14	4	20	4	9	1	6		6th	137
2024	(Poland) Kacper Sztuka	20	28	16	18	5	15	Ret	11	23	28	Ret	16	Ret	17	27	18	20	18	18	12		6th	137
2024	(Republic of Ireland) Alex Dunne	12	9	7	16	14	16	Ret	16	2	7	4	10	22	Ret	20	16	23	10	3	4		6th	137
2025		ALB; SPR	ALB; FEA	BHR; SPR	BHR; FEA	IMO; SPR	IMO; FEA	MCO; SPR	MCO; FEA	CAT; SPR	CAT; FEA	RBR; SPR	RBR; FEA	SIL; SPR	SIL; FEA	SPA; SPR	SPA; FEA	HUN; SPR	HUN; FEA	MNZ; SPR	MNZ; FEA		3rd	177
2025	(Germany) Tim Tramnitz	NC	5	6	3	1	6	5	5	Ret	7	6	2	11	18	12	C	13	13	18	10		3rd	177
2025	(Spain) Bruno del Pino	Ret	23	19	9	2	27	22	NC	12	17	22	19	20	9	8	C	25	25	14	11		3rd	177
2025	(France) Alessandro Giusti	11	25	7	7	10	7	4	10	6	3	2	12	12	14	10	C	Ret	9	6	8^{F}		3rd	177
2026		ALB; SPR	ALB; FEA	MCO; SPR	MCO; FEA	CAT; SPR	CAT; FEA	RBR; SPR	RBR; FEA	SIL; SPR	SIL; FEA	SPA; SPR	SPA; FEA	HUN; SPR	HUN; FEA	MNZ; SPR	MNZ; FEA	MAD; SPR	MAD; FE1	MAD; FE2			3rd	208
2026	(Argentina) Mattia Colnaghi	30	10	11	19	Ret	18	17	20	15	20	4	4	4	4	6	19	14	12	5			3rd	208
2026	(Finland) Tuukka Taponen	12	13	Ret	Ret	4	14	6	7	17	12	7	7	6^{F}	5^{P}	Ret^{F}	2	10	3^{F}	1^{P}			3rd	208
2026	(France) Alessandro Giusti	21	15	4	7	12	17	11	22	11	13	9	9	13	17	5	25†	5	6	6			3rd	208

=== Formula Regional European Championship ===
Year	Car	Drivers	Races	Wins	Poles	F. Laps	Podiums	D.C.	Pts	T.C.	Pts
2021	Tatuus F3 T-318- Alpine	(Netherlands) Kas Haverkort	20	0	0	0	0	16th	35	5th	177
2021	Tatuus F3 T-318- Alpine	(Argentina) Franco Colapinto	16	2	3	4	4	10th	102	5th	177
2021	Tatuus F3 T-318- Alpine	(Netherlands) Dilano van 't Hoff†	6	0	0	0	0	NC	0	5th	177
2021	Tatuus F3 T-318- Alpine	(Monaco) Oliver Goethe	20	0	0	0	0	23rd	3	5th	177
2022	Tatuus F3 T-318- Alpine	(France) Sami Meguetounif	19	0	0	0	1	16th	21	6th	133
2022	Tatuus F3 T-318- Alpine	Michael Belov	10	0	0	0	2	7th	91	6th	133
2022	Tatuus F3 T-318- Alpine	(Spain) Mari Boya	8	0	0	0	0	10th	3 (Note: 64 points scored for other teams.)	6th	133
2022	Tatuus F3 T-318- Alpine	(Netherlands) Dilano van 't Hoff	14	0	0	0	1	19th	16	6th	133
2022	Tatuus F3 T-318- Alpine	(Italy) Francesco Braschi	2	0	0	0	0	26th	0 (Note: 1 point scored for other teams.)	6th	133
2023	Tatuus F3 T-318- Alpine	(Spain) Bruno del Pino	2	0	0	0	0	32nd	0	6th	125
2023	Tatuus F3 T-318- Alpine	(Spain) Javier Sagrera†	4	0	0	0	0	NC	0	6th	125
2023	Tatuus F3 T-318- Alpine	(France) Sami Meguetounif	18	0	0	2	3	9th	75	6th	125
2023	Tatuus F3 T-318- Alpine	(Netherlands) Dilano van 't Hoff	8	0	0	0	0	23rd	8	6th	125
2023	Tatuus F3 T-318- Alpine	(France) Victor Bernier	18	0	0	0	1	15th	42	6th	125
2024	Tatuus F3 T-318- Alpine	(Italy) Nikita Bedrin	14	0	0	0	0	16th	33	8th	51
2024	Tatuus F3 T-318- Alpine	(United Kingdom) Isaac Barashi	4	0	0	0	0	41st	0	8th	51
2024	Tatuus F3 T-318- Alpine	(India) Nikhil Bohra	20	0	0	0	0	23rd	2	8th	51
2024	Tatuus F3 T-318- Alpine	(Italy) Valerio Rinicella	20	0	0	0	0	20th	16	8th	51
2025: MP Motorsport did not compete.
2026	Tatuus T-326- Toyota	(Kazakhstan) Alexander Abkhazava	19	0	0	1	3	6th	100	2nd	382
2026	Tatuus T-326- Toyota	(Italy) Zhenrui Chi (Note: Chi is a Chinese driver competing under an Italian licence.)	19	0	0	1	0	8th	73	2nd	382
2026	Tatuus T-326- Toyota	(United States) Sebastian Wheldon	19	4	4	1	8	**2nd**	**209**	2nd	382

† Ineligible to score points in the Drivers' Championship as a guest driver.

==== In detail ====
(key) (Races in bold indicate pole position) (Races in italics indicate fastest lap)

Year	Drivers	1	2	3	4	5	6	7	8	9	10	11	12	13	14	15	16	17	18	19	20	T.C.	Points
2021		IMO; 1	IMO; 2	CAT; 1	CAT; 2	MCO; 1	MCO; 2	LEC; 1	LEC; 2	ZAN; 1	ZAN; 2	SPA; 1	SPA; 2	RBR; 1	RBR; 2	VAL; 1	VAL; 2	MUG; 1	MUG; 2	MNZ; 1	MNZ; 2	5th	177
2021	(Netherlands) Kas Haverkort	Ret	25	Ret	17	14	11	7	15	18	6	14	18	29	Ret	15	14	10	7	11	4	5th	177
2021	(Argentina) Franco Colapinto	WD	WD	28†	Ret	WD	WD	12	12	5	2^{F}	Ret	6	1^{P F}	4^{P F}	1^{P F}	2	Ret	5	7	6	5th	177
2021	(Netherlands) Dilano van 't Hoff															20	Ret	25	21	24	15	5th	177
2021	(Monaco) Oliver Goethe	14	9	17	16	18	17	16	16	14	10	24	17	16	18	23	29	15	29	26	27	5th	177
2022		MNZ; 1	MNZ; 2	IMO; 1	IMO; 2	MCO; 1	MCO; 2	LEC; 1	LEC; 2	ZAN; 1	ZAN; 2	HUN; 1	HUN; 2	SPA; 1	SPA; 2	RBR; 1	RBR; 2	CAT; 1	CAT; 2	MUG; 1	MUG; 2	6th	133
2022	(France) Sami Meguetounif	9	11	Ret	DNS	15	11	15	19	13	16	17	Ret	2	11	11	15	20	21	16	28	6th	133
2022	Michael Belov	2	5	15	5	5	6	3	6	7	6											6th	133
2022	(Spain) Mari Boya													13	10	10	Ret	25	29	17	12	6th	133
2022	(Netherlands) Dilano van 't Hoff	Ret	19	21	18	DNQ	20			WD	WD			27	24	20	Ret	3	Ret	20	10	6th	133
2022	(Italy) Francesco Braschi											23	23									6th	133
2023		IMO; 1	IMO; 2	CAT; 1	CAT; 2	HUN; 1	HUN; 2	SPA; 1	SPA; 2	MUG; 1	MUG; 2	LEC; 1	LEC; 2	RBR; 1	RBR; 2	MNZ; 1	MNZ; 2	ZAN; 1	ZAN; 2	HOC; 1	HOC; 2	6th	125
2023	(Spain) Bruno del Pino													21	16							6th	125
2023	(Spain) Javier Sagrera																	28	15	19	Ret	6th	125
2023	(France) Sami Meguetounif	17	22	Ret	3	11	7	Ret	9^{F}			2	14	6	2^{F}	Ret	10	12	9	13	Ret	6th	125
2023	(Netherlands) Dilano van 't Hoff	14	7	Ret	22	23	9	30†	19													6th	125
2023	(France) Victor Bernier	12	4	12	15	17	20	9	15			7	17	15	11	2	19	Ret	16	15	8	6th	125
2024		HOC; 1	HOC; 2	SPA; 1	SPA; 2	ZAN; 1	ZAN; 2	HUN; 1	HUN; 2	MUG; 1	MUG; 2	LEC; 1	LEC; 2	IMO; 1	IMO; 2	RBR; 1	RBR; 2	CAT; 1	CAT; 2	MNZ; 1	MNZ; 2	8th	51
2024	(Italy) Nikita Bedrin	6	8			11	9			8	16			Ret	10	15	7	20	21	17	6	8th	51
2024	(United Kingdom) Isaac Barashi							26	Ret			25	27									8th	51
2024	(India) Nikhil Bohra	12	22	10	17	15	19	17	14	21	26	15	11	18	Ret	24	19	19	Ret	10	13	8th	51
2024	(Italy) Valerio Rinicella	14	20	14	14	Ret	27	11	19	15	15	13	12	13	19	6	Ret	13	15	6	12	8th	51
2025: MP Motorsport did not compete.
2026		RBR; 1	RBR; 2	RBR; 3	ZAN; 1	ZAN; 2	SPA; 1	SPA; 2	SPA; 3	MNZ; 1	MNZ; 2	MNZ; 3	HUN; 1	HUN; 2	LEC; 1	LEC; 2	IMO; 1	IMO; 2	IMO; 3	HOC; 1	HOC; 2	2nd	382
2026	(Kazakhstan) Alexander Abkhazava	7	Ret	13	7	9	27	C	2	4	Ret	Ret	12	13^{F}	3	5	4	7	Ret	13	3	2nd	382
2026	(Italy) Zhenrui Chi (Note: Chi is a Chinese driver competing under an Italian licence.)	4	5	22	8	5	Ret	C	11	6	4	12	15	26	6	7	14	26	23^{F}	4	15	2nd	382
2026	(United States) Sebastian Wheldon	3	19	3	1^{P}	1	5	C	10	5	20	2	26	Ret	5	1^{P F}	2	8	12	19^{P}	1^{P}	2nd	382

=== F4 Spanish Championship ===
Year	Car	Drivers	Races	Wins	Poles	F.L.	Points	D.C.	T.C.
2016	Tatuus F4-T014	(Netherlands) Richard Verschoor	20	18	15	16	387	**1st**	**1st**
2016	Tatuus F4-T014	(Spain) Xavier Lloveras	20	1	0	0	178	4th	**1st**
2016	Tatuus F4-T014	(Netherlands) Jarno Opmeer	6	0	1	0	80	7th	**1st**
2016	Tatuus F4-T014	(Venezuela) Sebastián Fernández	8	0	0	0	68	8th	**1st**
2016	Tatuus F4-T014	(Netherlands) Danny Kroes	9	0	0	0	48	10th	**1st**
2016	Tatuus F4-T014	(Finland) Juuso Puhakka	9	0	0	0	44	13th	**1st**
2017	Tatuus F4-T014	(Denmark) Christian Lundgaard	20	7	7	7	330	**1st**	**1st**
2017	Tatuus F4-T014	(Netherlands) Bent Viscaal	20	5	3	8	266	**2nd**	**1st**
2017	Tatuus F4-T014	(Austria) Lukas Dunner	20	0	0	0	129	8th	**1st**
2017	Tatuus F4-T014	(Spain) Marta García	20	0	0	0	70	9th	**1st**
2017	Tatuus F4-T014	(Malaysia) Nazim Azman	17	0	0	0	35	11th	**1st**
2018	Tatuus F4-T014	(Switzerland) Patrick Schott	17	0	0	0	119	5th	**1st**
2018	Tatuus F4-T014	(Malaysia) Nazim Azman (Note: Nazim Azman raced with Drivex for the first round, scoring 38 of his 179 points.)	14	0	0	0	179	4th	**1st**
2018	Tatuus F4-T014	(Hungary) László Tóth	14	0	0	0	47	11th	**1st**
2018	Tatuus F4-T014	(Sweden) Isac Blomqvist	3	0	2	1	48	10th	**1st**
2018	Tatuus F4-T014	(Belgium) Amaury Cordeel	17	3	6	9	208	**1st**	**1st**
2019	Tatuus F4-T014	(Belgium) Nicolas Baert	21	0	0	0	105	7th	**2nd**
2019	Tatuus F4-T014	(Netherlands) Tijmen van der Helm	21	0	0	0	158	4th	**2nd**
2019	Tatuus F4-T014	(Netherlands) Glenn van Berlo	21	3	5	2	222	**3rd**	**2nd**
2019	Tatuus F4-T014	(Denmark) Sebastian Øgaard	3	0	0	0	0	NC	**2nd**
2019	Tatuus F4-T014	(Spain) Rafael Villanueva Jr.	21	0	0	0	51	12th	**2nd**
2020	Tatuus F4-T014	(Netherlands) Kas Haverkort	21	13	12	9	383	**1st**	**1st**
2020	Tatuus F4-T014	(Spain) Mari Boya	21	3	3	4	272	**2nd**	**1st**
2020	Tatuus F4-T014	(Netherlands) Thomas ten Brinke	15	1	1	4	187	**3rd**	**1st**
2020	Tatuus F4-T014	(Switzerland) Joshua Dufek	21	0	1	1	187	4th	**1st**
2020	Tatuus F4-T014	(Denmark) Oliver Goethe	21	1	0	1	135	5th	**1st**
2020	Tatuus F4-T014	(France) Enzo Joulié	21	0	1	0	33	13th	**1st**
2020	Tatuus F4-T014	(Argentina) Ignacio Montenegro	6	0	0	0	0	25th	**1st**
2021	Tatuus F4-T014	(Netherlands) Dilano van 't Hoff	21	10	13	6	361	**1st**	**1st**
2021	Tatuus F4-T014	(Netherlands) Rik Koen	21	0	1	4	121	6th	**1st**
2021	Tatuus F4-T014	(Denmark) Noah Degnbol	21	0	0	1	107	7th	**1st**
2021	Tatuus F4-T014	(Denmark) Georg Kelstrup	21	1	0	0	65	10th	**1st**
2021	Tatuus F4-T014	(Morocco) Suleiman Zanfari	21	0	0	0	51	11th	**1st**
2021	Tatuus F4-T014	(Portugal) Manuel Espírito Santo	21	0	0	0	35	15th	**1st**
2021	Tatuus F4-T014	(Mexico) Gil Molina	21	0	0	0	19	18th	**1st**
2021	Tatuus F4-T014	(Russia) Miron Pingasov	9	0	0	0	6	20th	**1st**
2021	Tatuus F4-T014	(Italy) Santiago Trisini	6	0	0	0	0	26th	**1st**
2021	Tatuus F4-T014	(Netherlands) Emely de Heus	21	0	0	0	0	29th	**1st**
2022	Tatuus F4-T421	(Poland) Tymek Kucharczyk	21	1	0	0	227	**3rd**	**2nd**
2022	Tatuus F4-T421	(Kyrgyzstan) Kirill Smal	21	0	0	0	173	4th	**2nd**
2022	Tatuus F4-T421	(Italy) Valerio Rinicella	21	0	0	0	104	6th	**2nd**
2022	Tatuus F4-T421	(Thailand) Tasanapol Inthraphuvasak	21	1	1	0	63	9th	**2nd**
2022	Tatuus F4-T421	(Morocco) Suleiman Zanfari	15	0	0	0	70	7th	**3rd**
2022	Tatuus F4-T421	(Singapore) Christian Ho	21	0	0	0	50	13th	**3rd**
2022	Tatuus F4-T421	(Spain) Miron Pingasov	21	0	0	0	16	18th	**3rd**
2022	Tatuus F4-T421	(Denmark) Sebastian Gravlund	21	0	0	0	8	21st	**3rd**
2023	Tatuus F4-T421	(Italy) Valerio Rinicella	21	2	4	4	256	**3rd**	**1st**
2023	Tatuus F4-T421	(Brazil) Pedro Clerot	21	2	1	1	151	6th	**1st**
2023	Tatuus F4-T421	(United Arab Emirates) Keanu Al Azhari	21	0	1	0	100	9th	**1st**
2023	Tatuus F4-T421	(Colombia) Jerónimo Berrío	15	0	0	0	33	12th	6th
2023	Tatuus F4-T421	(Germany) Valentin Kluss	3	0	0	0	8	16th	6th
2023	Tatuus F4-T421	(Italy) Alvise Rodella	21	0	0	0	4	20th	6th
2023	Tatuus F4-T421	(Belgium) Thomas Strauven	3	0	0	0	0	32nd	6th
2023	Tatuus F4-T421	(Netherlands) Reno Francot	3	0	0	0	0	NC	6th
2023	Tatuus F4-T421	(United Kingdom) Akshay Bohra	3	0	0	0	0	NC	6th
2023	Tatuus F4-T421	(Belgium) Douwe Dedecker	0	0	0	0	0	NC	6th
2024	Tatuus F4-T421	(Italy) Mattia Colnaghi	21	6	7	5	282	**1st**	**1st**
2024	Tatuus F4-T421	(Poland) Maciej Gładysz	21	3	3	1	187	**3rd**	**1st**
2024	Tatuus F4-T421	(Spain) Lucas Fluxá	21	2	1	0	118	8th	**1st**
2024	Tatuus F4-T421	(United Arab Emirates) Keanu Al Azhari	21	4	5	3	272	**2nd**	**2nd**
2024	Tatuus F4-T421	(Australia) Griffin Peebles	21	0	2	1	106	9th	**2nd**
2024	Tatuus F4-T421	(Netherlands) René Lammers	21	0	0	0	55	13th	**2nd**
2025	Tatuus F4-T421	(Belgium) Ean Eyckmans	21	2	0	1	235	**2nd**	**2nd**
2025	Tatuus F4-T421	(Netherlands) René Lammers	21	4	0	1	221	4th	**2nd**
2025	Tatuus F4-T421	(Spain) Juan Cota	21	0	1	1	125	6th	**2nd**
2025	Tatuus F4-T421	(Netherlands) Rocco Coronel	3	0	0	0	0	NC	**2nd**
2025	Tatuus F4-T421	(Netherlands) Reno Francot	21	1	1	3	154	5th	**3rd**
2025	Tatuus F4-T421	(Austria) Niklas Schaufler	21	0	0	0	81	10th	**3rd**
2025	Tatuus F4-T421	(United States) Hudson Schwartz	21	0	0	0	62	11th	**3rd**
2026	Tatuus F4-T421	(Netherlands) Kasper Schormans	21	4	3	3	258	**1st**	**1st**
2026	Tatuus F4-T421	(Netherlands) Rocco Coronel	21	3	1	0	202	**3rd**	**1st**
2026	Tatuus F4-T421	(Netherlands) Felipe Reijs	21	0	0	0	1	24th	**1st**
2026	Tatuus F4-T421	(Poland) Borys Łyżeń	21	3	2	6	188	4th	5th
2026	Tatuus F4-T421	(Canada) Jensen Burnett	21	0	0	0	34	14th	5th
2026	Tatuus F4-T421	(Netherlands) Louis Cochet	12	0	0	0	2	22nd	5th
2026	Tatuus F4-T421	(Canada) Leonardo Serravalle	3	0	0	0	0	30th	5th
2026	Tatuus F4-T421	(United States) Max Mokarem†	5	0	0	0	0	36th	5th
2026	Tatuus F4-T421	(United Arab Emirates) Lucas Pasquinetti	3	0	0	0	0	48th	5th

† Mokarem drove for Tecnicar by Amtog in round 4.

=== 24H GT Series - GT3 ===
Year	Car	Drivers	Class	Races	Wins	Poles	F/Laps	Points	T.C.
2020	Mercedes-AMG GT3	(Netherlands) Bert de Heus (Netherlands) Daniël de Jong (Netherlands) Henk de Jong (Netherlands) Jaap van Lagen	**Am**	1	1	0	0	29	**2nd**
2021	Mercedes-AMG GT3	(Netherlands) Bert de Heus (Netherlands) Daniël de Jong (Netherlands) Henk de Jong (Netherlands) Jaap van Lagen	**Am**	1	0	0	0	21	NC
2022	Mercedes-AMG GT3	(Netherlands) Bert de Heus (Netherlands) Daniël de Jong (Netherlands) Henk de Jong (Netherlands) Jaap van Lagen	**PA**						

=== Eurocup-3 ===
Year	Car	Drivers	Races	Wins	Poles	F.L.	Points	D.C.	T.C.
2023	Tatuus F3 T-318	(Spain) Mari Boya	16	5	5	4	243	**2nd**	**2nd**
2023	Tatuus F3 T-318	(Denmark) Sebastian Øgaard	16	1	0	2	222	**3rd**	**2nd**
2023	Tatuus F3 T-318	(Mexico) José Garfias	16	0	0	0	160	4th	**2nd**
2023	Tatuus F3 T-318	(Spain) Bruno del Pino	16	0	0	0	113	7th	**2nd**
2023	Tatuus F3 T-318	(Denmark) Sebastian Gravlund	15	0	0	0	28	13th	**2nd**
2024	Tatuus F3 T-318	(Spain) Javier Sagrera	16	4	2	1	250	**1st**	**1st**
2024	Tatuus F3 T-318	(Spain) Bruno del Pino	16	3	1	3	209	**3rd**	**1st**
2024	Tatuus F3 T-318	(Vietnam) Owen Tangavelou	15	1	3	1	158	4th	**1st**
2024	Tatuus F3 T-318	(Brazil) Emerson Fittipaldi Jr.	16	1	1	1	149	5th	**1st**
2024	Tatuus F3 T-318	(Switzerland) Dario Cabanelas	12	0	0	1	13	16th	**1st**
2024	Tatuus F3 T-318	(Kyrgyzstan) Georgy Zhuravskiy†	16	0	0	0	2	22nd	**1st**
2025	Tatuus F3 T-318	(Italy) Mattia Colnaghi	16	5	4	5	256	**1st**	**1st**
2025	Tatuus F3 T-318	(Italy) Valerio Rinicella	18	1	0	2	221	**2nd**	**1st**
2025	Tatuus F3 T-318	(Peru) Andrés Cárdenas	18	1	1	1	98	7th	**1st**
2025	Tatuus F3 T-318	(Poland) Maciej Gładysz	18	1	0	0	88	10th	**1st**
2025	Tatuus F3 T-318	(Brazil) Emerson Fittipaldi Jr.	18	0	1	0	65	11th	**1st**
2025	Tatuus F3 T-318	(Angola) Lorenzo Campos	2	0	0	0	0	NC	**1st**
2025	Tatuus F3 T-318	(Kazakhstan) Alexander Abkhazava	18	0	0	0	53	12th	5th
2025	Tatuus F3 T-318	(United Kingdom) Kai Daryanani	13	0	0	0	13	17th	5th
2025	Tatuus F3 T-318	(Spain) Juan Cota	4	0	0	0	2	19th	5th
2026	Dallara 326-TOM'S	(Belgium) Ean Eyckmans	19	1	1	0	194	4th	**2nd**
2026	Dallara 326-TOM'S	(Netherlands) René Lammers	19	1	1	0	191	5th	**2nd**
2026	Dallara 326-TOM'S	(Australia) Gianmarco Pradel	19	0	1	0	69	9th	**2nd**
2026	Dallara 326-TOM'S	(Brazil) Alceu Feldmann Neto	18	0	0	0	0	28th	**2nd**

† Zhuravskiy drove for Drivex until round 6.

=== F1 Academy ===
Year	Car	Drivers	Races	Wins	Poles	F.L.	Podiums	Points	D.C.	T.C.
2023	Tatuus F4-T421	(United Arab Emirates) Hamda Al Qubaisi	21	4	2	5	7	207	**3rd**	**2nd**
2023	Tatuus F4-T421	(United Arab Emirates) Amna Al Qubaisi	21	2	0	2	4	117	6th	**2nd**
2023	Tatuus F4-T421	(Netherlands) Emely de Heus	21	1	1	0	2	87	9th	**2nd**
2024	Tatuus F4-T421	(United Arab Emirates) Hamda Al Qubaisi	14	0	0	0	3	133	5th	4th
2024	Tatuus F4-T421	(Netherlands) Emely de Heus	14	0	0	0	0	29	11th	4th
2024	Tatuus F4-T421	(United Arab Emirates) Amna Al Qubaisi	14	0	0	0	0	16	15th	4th
2025	Tatuus F4-T421	(Netherlands) Maya Weug	13	3	3	2	9	157	**2nd**	**3rd**
2025	Tatuus F4-T421	(Denmark) Alba Hurup Larsen	14	0	0	0	0	70	7th	**3rd**
2025	Tatuus F4-T421	(Australia) Joanne Ciconte	14	0	0	0	0	8	14th	**3rd**
2026	Tatuus F4-T421	(Netherlands) Nina Gademan								
2026	Tatuus F4-T421	(Denmark) Alba Hurup Larsen								
2026	Tatuus F4-T421	(Netherlands) Esmee Kosterman								

* Season still in progress.

== Former series results ==
=== GP2 Series ===
Year	Car	Drivers	Races	Wins	Poles	F.L.	Points	D.C.	T.C.
2013	Dallara GP2/11-Mecachrome	(United Kingdom) Adrian Quaife-Hobbs (Note: Adrian Quaife-Hobbs raced for Hilmer Motorsport for 10 races in 2013 scoring 33 of his 56 points.)	12	0	0	0	56	13th	10th
2013	Dallara GP2/11-Mecachrome	(Spain) Dani Clos	10	0	0	1	25	18th	10th
2013	Dallara GP2/11-Mecachrome	(Netherlands) Daniël de Jong	22	0	0	0	3	24th	10th
2014	Dallara GP2/11-Mecachrome	(Denmark) Marco Sørensen	14	1	0	0	47	11th	8th
2014	Dallara GP2/11-Mecachrome	(United Kingdom) Jon Lancaster (Note: Jon Lancaster raced for Hilmer Motorsport for 6 races in 2014 scoring a points finish at Hockenheimring.)	2	0	0	0	6	23rd	8th
2014	Dallara GP2/11-Mecachrome	(Cyprus) Tio Ellinas	6	0	0	0	7	22nd	8th
2014	Dallara GP2/11-Mecachrome	(Netherlands) Daniël de Jong	22	0	0	0	2	28th	8th
2015	Dallara GP2/11-Mecachrome	(Spain) Sergio Canamasas	6	0	0	0	27	15th	11th
2015	Dallara GP2/11-Mecachrome	(United Kingdom) Oliver Rowland	4	0	0	0	3	20th	11th
2015	Dallara GP2/11-Mecachrome	(Austria) René Binder	7	0	0	0	2	22nd	11th
2015	Dallara GP2/11-Mecachrome	(Netherlands) Daniël de Jong	14	0	0	0	1	23rd	11th
2015	Dallara GP2/11-Mecachrome	(Canada) Nicholas Latifi	7	0	0	0	0	27th	11th
2015	Dallara GP2/11-Mecachrome	(Netherlands) Meindert van Buuren	1	0	0	0	0	NC	11th
2016	Dallara GP2/11-Mecachrome	(United Kingdom) Oliver Rowland	22	0	0	0	107	9th	7th
2016	Dallara GP2/11-Mecachrome	(Netherlands) Daniël de Jong	22	0	0	0	6	21st	7th

=== In detail ===
(key) (Races in bold indicate pole position) (Races in italics indicate fastest lap)

Year	Chassis Engine Tyres	Drivers	1	2	3	4	5	6	7	8	9	10	11	12	13	14	15	16	17	18	19	20	21	22	T.C.	Points
2013	GP2/11; Mecachrome; **P**		SEP; FEA	SEP; SPR	BHR; FEA	BHR; SPR	CAT; FEA	CAT; SPR	MON; FEA	MON; SPR	SIL; FEA	SIL; SPR	NÜR; FEA	NÜR; SPR	HUN; FEA	HUN; SPR	SPA; FEA	SPA; SPR	MNZ; FEA	MNZ; SPR	MRN; FEA	MRN; SPR	YMC; FEA	YMC; SPR	10th	51
2013	GP2/11; Mecachrome; **P**	(United Kingdom) Adrian Quaife-Hobbs	Ret	17	7	8	17	21	8	2	12	11	Ret	16											10th	51
2013	GP2/11; Mecachrome; **P**	(Spain) Dani Clos													14	Ret	20	19	18	9	10	21	5	2	10th	51
2013	GP2/11; Mecachrome; **P**	(Netherlands) Daniël de Jong	Ret	14	Ret	19	16	18	10	9	22	18	15	Ret	12	Ret	Ret	17	11	19	17	7	19^{†}	17	10th	51
2014	GP2/11; Mecachrome; **P**		BHR; FEA	BHR; SPR	CAT; FEA	CAT; SPR	MON; FEA	MON; SPR	RBR; FEA	RBR; SPR	SIL; FEA	SIL; SPR	HOC; FEA	HOC; SPR	HUN; FEA	HUN; SPR	SPA; FEA	SPA; SPR	MNZ; FEA	MNZ; SPR	SOC; FEA	SOC; SPR	YMC; FEA	YMC; SPR	8th	56
2014	GP2/11; Mecachrome; **P**	(Netherlands) Daniël de Jong	11	11	Ret	19	11	Ret	19	21	19	14	Ret	16	14	18	10	13	Ret	9	14	19	10	Ret	8th	56
2014	GP2/11; Mecachrome; **P**	(United Kingdom) Jon Lancaster	17	15																					8th	56
2014	GP2/11; Mecachrome; **P**	(Cyprus) Tio Ellinas			7	11	10	22	23	22															8th	56
2014	GP2/11; Mecachrome; **P**	(Denmark) Marco Sørensen									9	8	9	4	10	10	14	11	7	4	8	1	Ret	21	8th	56
2015	GP2/11; Mecachrome; **P**		BHR; FEA	BHR; SPR	CAT; FEA	CAT; SPR	MON; FEA	MON; SPR	RBR; FEA	RBR; SPR	SIL; FEA	SIL; SPR	HUN; FEA	HUN; SPR	SPA; FEA	SPA; SPR	MNZ; FEA	MNZ; SPR	SOC; FEA	SOC; SPR	BHR; FEA	BHR; SPR	YMC; FEA	YMC; SPR	11th	29
2015	GP2/11; Mecachrome; **P**	(Spain) Sergio Canamasas	14	Ret	13	15	3	4																	11th	29
2015	GP2/11; Mecachrome; **P**	(United Kingdom) Oliver Rowland									10	7			NC	Ret									11th	29
2015	GP2/11; Mecachrome; **P**	(Canada) Nicholas Latifi											15	14					18	14	14	11	Ret	C	11th	29
2015	GP2/11; Mecachrome; **P**	(Netherlands) Meindert van Buuren															Ret	DNS							11th	29
2015	GP2/11; Mecachrome; **P**	(Netherlands) Daniël de Jong	18	13	15	9	12	12	21	12	11	26^{†}	10	Ret	Ret	DNS									11th	29
2015	GP2/11; Mecachrome; **P**	(Austria) René Binder															10	8	16	Ret	20	Ret	14	C	11th	29
2016	GP2/11; Mecachrome; **P**		CAT; FEA	CAT; SPR	MON; FEA	MON; SPR	BAK; FEA	BAK; SPR	RBR; FEA	RBR; SPR	SIL; FEA	SIL; SPR	HUN; FEA	HUN; SPR	HOC; FEA	HOC; SPR	SPA; FEA	SPA; SPR	MNZ; FEA	MNZ; SPR	SEP; FEA	SEP; SPR	YMC; FEA	YMC; SPR	7th	113
2016	GP2/11; Mecachrome; **P**	(United Kingdom) Oliver Rowland	10	6	3	7	4	15^{†}	6	2	3	3	11	6	5	5	10	6	9	9	12	8	Ret	11	7th	113
2016	GP2/11; Mecachrome; **P**	(Netherlands) Daniël de Jong	14	17	9	11	8	14	14	20	19	16	15	11	Ret	16	17	17	17	19	17	Ret	14	Ret	7th	113

=== GP3 Series ===
Year	Car	Drivers	Races	Wins	Poles	F.L.	Points	D.C.	T.C.
2018	Dallara GP3/16-Mecachrome	(France) Dorian Boccolacci	10	1	1	1	58	10th	4th
2018	Dallara GP3/16-Mecachrome	(Netherlands) Richard Verschoor	8	0	0	0	30	15th	4th
2018	Dallara GP3/16-Mecachrome	(Finland) Niko Kari	14	0	0	0	6	17th	4th
2018	Dallara GP3/16-Mecachrome	(Canada) Devlin DeFrancesco	14	0	0	0	0	21st	4th
2018	Dallara GP3/16-Mecachrome	(Denmark) Christian Lundgaard	2	0	0	0	0	23rd	4th
2018	Dallara GP3/16-Mecachrome	(United Kingdom) Will Palmer	2	0	0	0	0	25th	4th
2018	Dallara GP3/16-Mecachrome	(India) Jehan Daruvala	2	0	0	0	0	26th	4th

=== In detail ===
(key) (Races in bold indicate pole position) (Races in italics indicate fastest lap)

Year	Chassis Engine Tyres	Drivers	1	2	3	4	5	6	7	8	9	10	11	12	13	14	15	16	17	18	T.C.	Points
2018	GP3/16; Mecachrome; **P**		CAT; FEA	CAT; SPR	LEC; FEA	LEC; SPR	RBR; FEA	RBR; SPR	SIL; FEA	SIL; SPR	HUN; FEA	HUN; SPR	SPA; FEA	SPA; SPR	MNZ; FEA	MNZ; SPR	SOC; FEA	SOC; SPR	YMC; FEA	YMC; SPR	4th	94
2018	GP3/16; Mecachrome; **P**	(France) Dorian Boccolacci	5	5	**DSQ**	14	10	5	5	9	8	1									4th	94
2018	GP3/16; Mecachrome; **P**	(Netherlands) Richard Verschoor											17	7	8	9	4	3	14	7	4th	94
2018	GP3/16; Mecachrome; **P**	(United Kingdom) Will Palmer	18	13																	4th	94
2018	GP3/16; Mecachrome; **P**	(Denmark) Christian Lundgaard			12	13															4th	94
2018	GP3/16; Mecachrome; **P**	(Canada) Devlin DeFrancesco					18^{†}	11	15	14	WD	WD	18	Ret	13	15	17	12	17	11	4th	94
2018	GP3/16; Mecachrome; **P**	(Finland) Niko Kari	Ret	6	DSQ	Ret	11	8	11	Ret	Ret	Ret	14	12	10	10					4th	94
2018	GP3/16; Mecachrome; **P**	(India) Jehan Daruvala																	19	13	4th	94

=== SMP F4 Championship ===
Year	Car	Drivers	Races	Wins	Poles	F.L.	Points	D.C.
2016	Tatuus F4-T014	(Netherlands) Richard Verschoor	20	10	10	9	339	**1st**
2016	Tatuus F4-T014	(Netherlands) Jarno Opmeer	20	6	3	5	270	**2nd**
2016	Tatuus F4-T014	(Netherlands) Danny Kroes	11	0	0	0	32	12th
2017	Tatuus F4-T014	(Denmark) Christian Lundgaard	18	9	7	10	255	**1st**
2017	Tatuus F4-T014	(Netherlands) Bent Viscaal	18	1	0	1	153	5th
2017	Tatuus F4-T014	(France) Tristan Charpentier	3	0	0	0	4	13th
2017	Tatuus F4-T014	(Austria) Lukas Dunner	15	0	0	0	16	15th
2017	Tatuus F4-T014	(Netherlands) John Peters	9	0	0	0	4	17th
2018	Tatuus F4-T014	(Netherlands) Freek Schothorst	3	0	0	1	36	10th
2018	Tatuus F4-T014	(Switzerland) Patrick Schott	12	0	0	0	31	12th
2018	Tatuus F4-T014	(Hungary) László Tóth	3	0	0	0	0	21st
2018	Tatuus F4-T014	(Sweden) Isac Blomqvist	21	3	1	3	201	**3rd**
2018	Tatuus F4-T014	(Belgium) Amaury Cordeel	12	2	1	2	107	8th

=== F3 Asian Championship ===
Year	Car	Drivers	Races	Wins	Poles	Fast laps	Points	D.C.	T.C.
2019–20	Tatuus F3 T-318	(Belgium) Amaury Cordeel	3	0	0	0	0	NC	8th

=== Toyota Racing Series ===
Year	Car	Drivers	Races	Wins	Poles	Fast laps	Points	D.C.
2020	Tatuus FT-60	(United States) Spike Kohlbecker	15	0	0	0	109	13th
2020	Tatuus FT-60	(Switzerland) Axel Gnos	15	0	0	0	60	18th
2020	Tatuus FT-60	(Netherlands) Tijmen van der Helm	9	1	0	0	84	14th
2020	Tatuus FT-60	(Puerto Rico) Jose Blanco	6	0	0	0	41	19th
2020	Tatuus FT-60	(Argentina) Franco Colapinto	15	1	1	2	315	3rd

=== Eurocup Formula Renault 2.0 ===
Year	Car	Drivers	Races	Wins	Poles	F.L.	Podiums	Points	D.C.	T.C.
2008	Tatuus–Renault	(Netherlands) Paul Meijer	6	1	0	0	1	21	11th	10th
2008	Tatuus–Renault	(Netherlands) Nick Catsburg	2	0	0	0	0	0	41st	10th
2008	Tatuus–Renault	(Poland) Mateusz Adamski	2	0	0	0	0	0	51st	10th
2009	Tatuus–Renault	(Netherlands) Nigel Melker	10	0	0	0	0	5	23rd	10th
2009	Tatuus–Renault	(Netherlands) Daniël de Jong	14	0	0	0	0	3	25th	10th
2009	Tatuus–Renault	(Estonia) Karl-Oscar Liiv	8	0	0	0	0	0	33rd	10th
2009	Tatuus–Renault	(United Kingdom) Adam Christodoulou	2	0	0	0	0	0	38th	10th
2010	Tatuus–Renault	(Netherlands) Daniël de Jong	16	0	0	0	1	48	9th	5th
2010	Tatuus–Renault	(Estonia) Karl-Oscar Liiv	12	0	0	0	0	22	14th	5th
2010	Tatuus–Renault	(Finland) Kalle Kulmanen	16	0	0	0	0	3	22nd	5th
2011	Tatuus–Renault	(Estonia) Karl-Oscar Liiv	14	0	0	0	0	12	17th	10th
2011	Tatuus–Renault	(Sweden) Kevin Kleveros	12	0	0	0	0	1	22nd	10th
2011	Tatuus–Renault	(Estonia) Johannes Moor	14	0	0	0	0	0	27th	10th
2011	Tatuus–Renault	(Russia) Aleksey Chuklin	6	0	0	0	0	0	45th	10th
2012	Tatuus–Renault	(United Kingdom) Jordan King	14	0	0	0	1	31	13th	8th
2012	Tatuus–Renault	(Netherlands) Steijn Schothorst	12	0	0	0	0	12	22nd	8th
2012	Tatuus–Renault	(Netherlands) Meindert van Buuren	12	0	0	0	0	0	32nd	8th
2012	Tatuus–Renault	(Denmark) Johan Jokinen	4	0	0	0	0	0	35th	8th
2012	Tatuus–Renault	(Thailand) Tanart Sathienthirakul	4	0	0	0	0	0	42nd	8th
2012	Tatuus–Renault	(Sweden) Kevin Kleveros	2	0	0	0	0	0	NC	8th
2013	Tatuus–Renault	(United Kingdom) Oliver Rowland	14	3	2	2	8	179	**2nd**	4th
2013	Tatuus–Renault	(United Kingdom) Melville McKee	2	0	0	0	0	0	26th	4th
2013	Tatuus–Renault	(Argentina) Javier Merlo	8	0	0	0	0	0	30th	4th
2013	Tatuus–Renault	(France) Léo Roussel	14	0	0	0	0	0	32nd	4th
2013	Tatuus–Renault	(United Kingdom) Gregor Ramsay	8	0	0	0	0	0	NC	4th
2013	Tatuus–Renault	(United Kingdom) Jack Aitken	4	0	0	0	0	0	NC	4th
2014	Tatuus–Renault	(France) Andrea Pizzitola	14	2	2	0	3	108	4th	6th
2014	Tatuus–Renault	(Netherlands) Steijn Schothorst	14	0	0	0	0	24	17th	6th
2014	Tatuus–Renault	(Ecuador) Julio Moreno	4	0	0	0	0	0	NC	6th
2015	Tatuus–Renault	(Norway) Dennis Olsen	17	1	1	0	2	101	8th	4th
2015	Tatuus–Renault	(Italy) Ignazio D'Agosto	17	0	0	1	3	94	9th	4th
2015	Tatuus–Renault	(France) Valentin Hasse-Clot	17	0	0	0	0	2	19th	4th
2015	Tatuus–Renault	(Denmark) Lasse Sørensen	7	0	0	0	0	0	26th	4th
2015	Tatuus–Renault	(Brazil) Bruno Baptista	12	0	0	0	0	0	NC	4th
2015	Tatuus–Renault	(Australia) Christopher Anthony	4	0	0	0	0	0	NC	4th
2016: "MP Motorsport" did not compete.
2017	Tatuus–Renault	(Netherlands) Richard Verschoor	20	0	0	0	0	54	10th	5th
2017	Tatuus–Renault	(United States) Neil Verhagen	20	0	0	0	1	53	11th	5th
2017	Tatuus–Renault	(Netherlands) Jarno Opmeer	20	0	0	0	0	15	15th	5th
2018	Tatuus–Renault	(Denmark) Christian Lundgaard	20	4	4	3	10	258	**2nd**	**2nd**
2018	Tatuus–Renault	(Australia) Alex Peroni	20	1	1	1	2	89	9th	**2nd**
2018	Tatuus–Renault	(Belgium) Max Defourny	8	0	0	0	1	28	14th	**2nd**
2018	Tatuus–Renault	(Netherlands) Jarno Opmeer	4	0	0	0	0	0	25th	**2nd**
2018	Tatuus–Renault	(Netherlands) Freek Schothorst	8	0	0	0	0	0	30th	**2nd**
2019	Tatuus F3 T-318–Renault	(France) Victor Martins	20	6	8	5	14	312.5	**2nd**	**2nd**
2019	Tatuus F3 T-318–Renault	(Italy) Lorenzo Colombo	20	3	3	2	7	214.5	4th	**2nd**
2019	Tatuus F3 T-318–Renault	(Belgium) Amaury Cordeel	20	0	0	0	0	27	15th	**2nd**
2020	Tatuus F3 T-318–Renault	(Argentina) Franco Colapinto	20	2	0	2	9	213.5	**3rd**	**3rd**
2020	Tatuus F3 T-318–Renault	(France) Hadrien David	20	0	0	0	1	71	10th	**3rd**
2020	Tatuus F3 T-318–Renault	(Czech Republic) Petr Ptáček	20	0	0	0	0	39	14th†	**3rd**
2020	Tatuus F3 T-318–Renault	(Czech Republic) Roman Staněk	2	0	0	0	0	2	18th	**3rd**
2020	Tatuus F3 T-318–Renault	(Netherlands) Joey Alders	4	0	0	1	0	1	19th	**3rd**
2020	Tatuus F3 T-318–Renault	(Netherlands) Kas Haverkort	4	0	0	0	0	0	NC	**3rd**

† Ptáček drove for R-ace GP until Round 7.

=== Formula 4 UAE Championship ===
Year	Car	Drivers	Races	Wins	Poles	F.L.	Points	D.C.	T.C.
2022	Tatuus F4-T421	(Thailand) Tasanapol Inthraphuvasak	20	1	2	1	163	7th	5th
2022	Tatuus F4-T421	(Spain) Miron Pingasov	20	0	0	0	47	14th	5th
2022	Tatuus F4-T421	(Morocco) Suleiman Zanfari	20	0	0	0	26	17th	5th
2022	Tatuus F4-T421	(Netherlands) Rik Koen	8	0	0	0	22	18th	5th
2022	Tatuus F4-T421	(Singapore) Christian Ho	12	0	0	0	13	21st	5th
2022	Tatuus F4-T421	(Italy) Valerio Rinicella	12	0	0	0	0	26th	5th
2023	Tatuus F4-T421	(Italy) Valerio Rinicella	15	0	1	0	171	4th	**2nd**
2023	Tatuus F4-T421	(Brazil) Pedro Clerot	6	0	0	0	30	13th	**2nd**
2023	Tatuus F4-T421	Kirill Smal	3	0	0	0	22	16th	**2nd**
2023	Tatuus F4-T421	(Uzbekistan) Ismail Akhmedkhodjaev	6	0	0	0	0	41st	**2nd**
2023	Tatuus F4-T421	(Netherlands) Emely de Heus	9	0	0	0	0	43rd	**2nd**

=== Formula Winter Series ===
Year	Car	Drivers	Races	Wins	Poles	F.L.	Points	D.C.	T.C.
2024	Tatuus F4-T421	(Australia) Griffin Peebles	11	4	4	5	173	**1st**	1st
2024	Tatuus F4-T421	(Poland) Maciej Gładysz	11	0	0	0	92	**3rd**	1st
2024	Tatuus F4-T421	(United Arab Emirates) Keanu Al Azhari	5	1	2	1	58	7th	1st
2024	Tatuus F4-T421	(Spain) Lucas Fluxá	11	0	0	0	29	13th	1st
2024	Tatuus F4-T421	(Italy) Mattia Colnaghi	6	0	0	0	16	18th	1st
2024	Tatuus F4-T421	(Netherlands) René Lammers	11	0	0	0	14	19th	1st
2024	Tatuus F4-T421	(Australia) Peter Bouzinelos	11	0	0	0	1	29th	1st

=== Formula Regional Middle East Championship ===
Year	Car	Drivers	Races	Wins	Poles	F.L.	Points	D.C.	T.C.
2023	Tatuus F3 T-318	(Spain) Mari Boya	15	2	0	2	107	5th	**3rd** (Note: Entered as Hyderabad Blackbirds by MP Motorsport)
2023	Tatuus F3 T-318	(France) Sami Meguetounif	15	1	2	0	65	10th	**3rd**
2023	Tatuus F3 T-318	(Paraguay) Joshua Dürksen	6	0	2	0	29	16th	**3rd**
2023	Tatuus F3 T-318	(Denmark) Sebastian Øgaard	6	0	0	0	10	24th	**3rd**
2023	Tatuus F3 T-318	(United States) Brad Benavides	13	0	0	0	1	29th	**3rd**
2023	Tatuus F3 T-318	(France) Owen Tangavelou	3	0	0	0	0	33rd	**3rd**
2024	Tatuus F3 T-318	(India) Nikhil Bohra	15	1	0	0	49	12th	6th
2024	Tatuus F3 T-318	(Spain) Bruno del Pino	15	0	0	0	18	16th	6th
2024	Tatuus F3 T-318	(Italy) Valerio Rinicella	6	0	0	0	14	17th	6th
2024	Tatuus F3 T-318	(Brazil) Emerson Fittipaldi Jr.	15	0	0	0	5	20th	6th
2024	Tatuus F3 T-318	(United Kingdom) Isaac Barashi	9	0	0	0	0	30th	6th

== Timeline ==
Current series
F4 Spanish Championship	2016–present
FIA Formula 2 Championship	2017–present
FIA Formula 3 Championship	2019–present
Formula Regional European Championship	2021–2024, 2026–present
Eurocup-3	2023–present
F1 Academy	2023–present
Middle East Trophy	2023–present
Formula Regional Middle East Championship	2023–2024, 2026–present
Former series
Benelux Formula Ford 1800	1996–2002
Dutch Formula 1800	1996–2002
Formula Renault 2.0 Masters	2003
Formula Renault 2.0 Netherlands	2003–2005
Formula Renault 2.0 Germany	2005
Formula Renault 2.0 Northern European Cup	2006–2015, 2017–2020
Formula Renault Eurocup	2008–2015, 2017–2020
Formula Renault 2.0 West European Cup	2008
Auto GP	2011–2013
GP2 Series	2013–2016
V de V Challenge Monoplace	2016
SMP F4 Championship	2016–2018
GP3 Series	2018
24H Series	2018–2022
F3 Asian Championship	2020
Toyota Racing Series	2020
Supercar Challenge	2021
Formula 4 UAE Championship	2021–2023
F4 Indian Championship	2023–2024
Formula Winter Series	2024

== Notes ==
Achievements
Preceded by none	F4 Spanish Teams' Champion; 2016-2018	Succeeded by Drivex School
Preceded by Drivex School	F4 Spanish Teams' Champion; 2020–2021, 2023–2024	Succeeded by Campos Racing
