= Dallara F3 2025 =

Open-wheel racing car built by Dallara

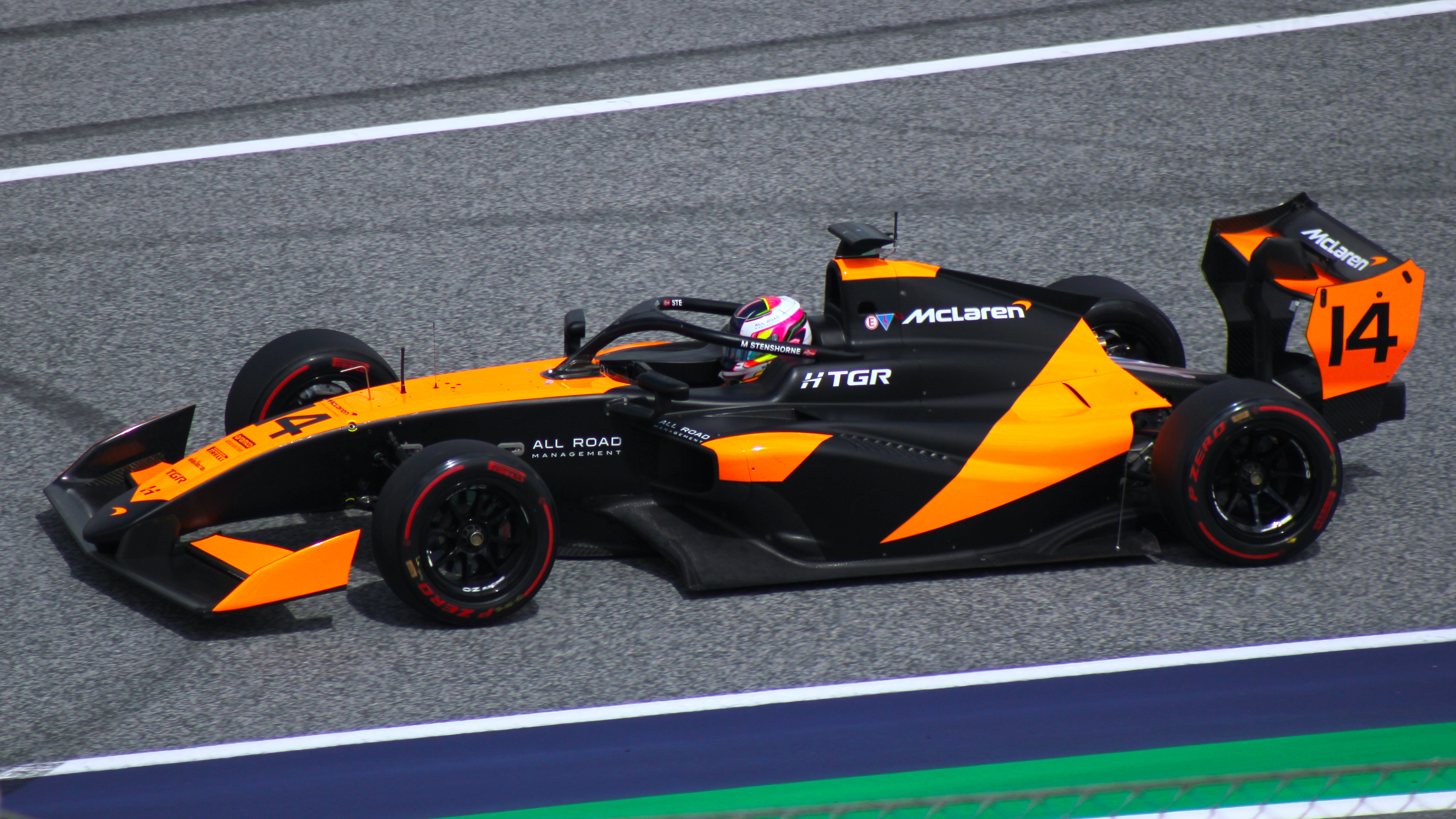
- Martinius Stenshorne driving an F3 2025 at the Red Bull Ring in 2025
- Category: FIA Formula 3
- Constructor: Dallara
- Designers: Pierre-Alain Michot (Technical Director, Formula 3)
- Predecessor: Dallara F3 2019

Technical specifications
- Chassis: Carbon fibre kevlar monocoque with honeycomb structure
- Suspension (front): Double steel wishbones, pushrod operated, twin dampers, helicoidally spring suspension
- Suspension (rear): As front
- Length: 4,965 mm (195 in)
- Width: 1,885 mm (74 in)
- Height: 1,043 mm (41 in)
- Engine: Mecachrome V634 3.4 litres (207 cubic inches) V6 95° naturally aspirated, rear-mounted, rear-wheel-drive
- Transmission: 3Mo 6-speed sequential paddle-shift
- Power: 380 horsepower (283 kilowatts) @8,000 rpm 420 newton-metres (310 pound force-feet)
- Weight: 673 kg (1,484 lb) (including driver)
- Fuel: Aramco Advanced 100% sustainable fuel
- Lubricants: Aramco Orizon
- Tyres: Pirelli P Zero (dry) and Pirelli Cinturato (wet) tyres

Competition history
- Notable entrants: All F3 Series teams
- Notable drivers: All F3 Series drivers
- Debut: 2025 Melbourne Formula 3 round
- Constructors' Championships: Campos Racing (2025–2026)
- Drivers' Championships: Rafael Câmara (2025); Ugo Ugochukwu (2026)

The Dallara F3 2025 is an open-wheel racing car developed by Italian manufacturer Dallara for use in the FIA Formula 3 Championship, a feeder series for Formula One. The F3 2025 was the second car used by the FIA Formula 3 Championship and was introduced for the 2025 season. As the Formula 3 Championship is a spec series, the F3 2025 is raced by every team and driver competing in the series. The F3 2025 was unveiled at the weekend of the final round of the 2024 season in Monza and later made its first public appearance when teams contesting the 2025 season completed a test day at the Circuit de Barcelona-Catalunya in February 2025.

== Design ==
=== Engine package ===
The F3 2025 carries over the same V634, 3.4 L (207 cu in) V6 naturally-aspirated engine, developed by Mecachrome Motorsport that powered its predecessors, the GP3/16 and F3 2019.

=== Tyres ===
Pirelli would remain as the official tyre partner and supplier of FIA Formula 3 Championship. One change was made to the tyres, as they run on 16-inch rims.

== See also ==
- Dallara F3 2019
