= Dallara F3 2019 =

Open-wheel formula racing car built by Dallara

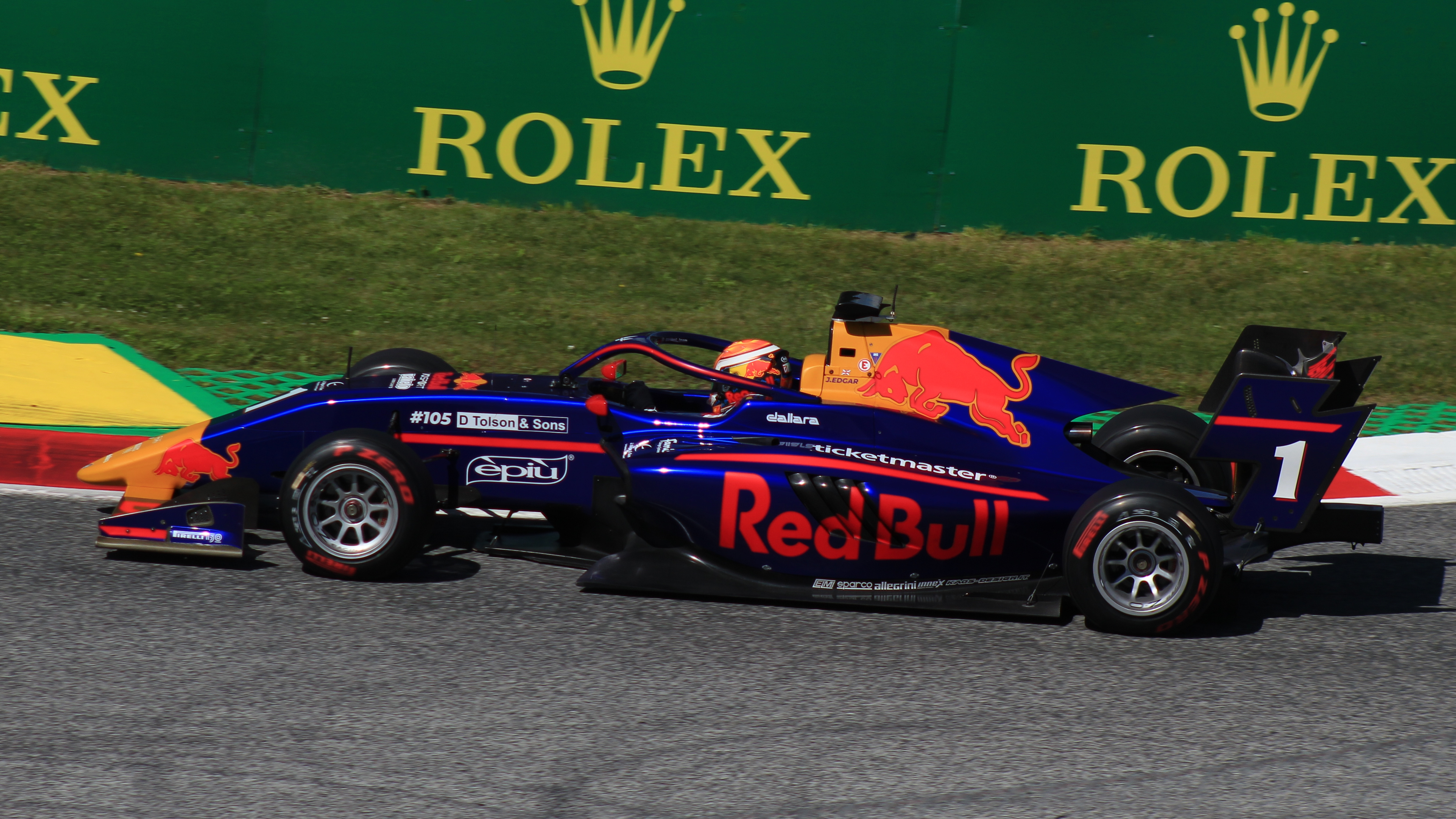
- Jonny Edgar driving an F3 2019 during the 2022 Spielberg Formula 3 round
- Category: FIA Formula 3
- Constructor: Dallara
- Designer: Luca Pignacca
- Predecessor: Dallara GP3/16
- Successor: Dallara F3 2025

Technical specifications
- Chassis: Carbon fibre monocoque with honeycomb structure
- Suspension (front): Double steel wishbones, pushrod operated, twin dampers, helicoidally spring suspension
- Suspension (rear): As front
- Length: 4,965 mm (195 in)
- Width: 1,885 mm (74 in)
- Height: 1,043 mm (41 in)
- Engine: Mecachrome V634 3.4 litres (207 cubic inches) V6 95 degree naturally aspirated, rear-mounted, rear-wheel-drive
- Transmission: Hewland F3B-200 6 forward + 1 reverse sequential paddle-shift
- Power: 380 horsepower (283 kilowatts) @8,000 rpm 420 newton-metres (310 pound force-feet)
- Weight: 673 kg (1,484 lb) (including driver)
- Fuel: Elf LMS 89.6 MON, 101.6 RON unleaded (2019-2022) later Aramco Advanced 55% sustainable fuel (2023-2024)
- Lubricants: Elf HTX 840 (2019-2022) later Aramco Orizon (2023-2024)
- Tyres: Pirelli P Zero (dry) and Pirelli Cinturato (wet) tyres

Competition history
- Notable entrants: All F3 Series teams
- Notable drivers: All F3 Series drivers
- Debut: 2019 Barcelona Formula 3 round
- Last event: 2024 Monza Formula 3 round
- Constructors' Championships: Prema Racing (2019–2020, 2022–2024); Trident (2021)
- Drivers' Championships: Robert Shwartzman (2019); Oscar Piastri (2020); Dennis Hauger (2021); Victor Martins (2022); Gabriel Bortoleto (2023); Leonardo Fornaroli (2024)

The Dallara F3 2019 was an open-wheel racing car developed by Italian manufacturer Dallara for use in the FIA Formula 3 Championship, a feeder series for Formula One. The F3 2019 was the first car used by the FIA Formula 3 Championship and was introduced for the championship's inaugural season and was used until the 2024 season before being replaced by planned Dallara F3 2025 from 2025 season onwards. As the Formula 3 Championship is a spec series, the F3 2019 raced by every team and driver competing in the series. The F3 2019 was unveiled at the weekend of the final GP3 Series round in Abu Dhabi in November 2018 and later made its first public appearance when teams contesting the inaugural championship completed a test day at the Circuit de Nevers Magny-Cours in February 2019.

As of 2025, the Dallara F3 2019 remains the longest-serving FIA Formula 3 Championship chassis usage since 2019 through 2024 seasons.

== Design ==
=== Chassis ===
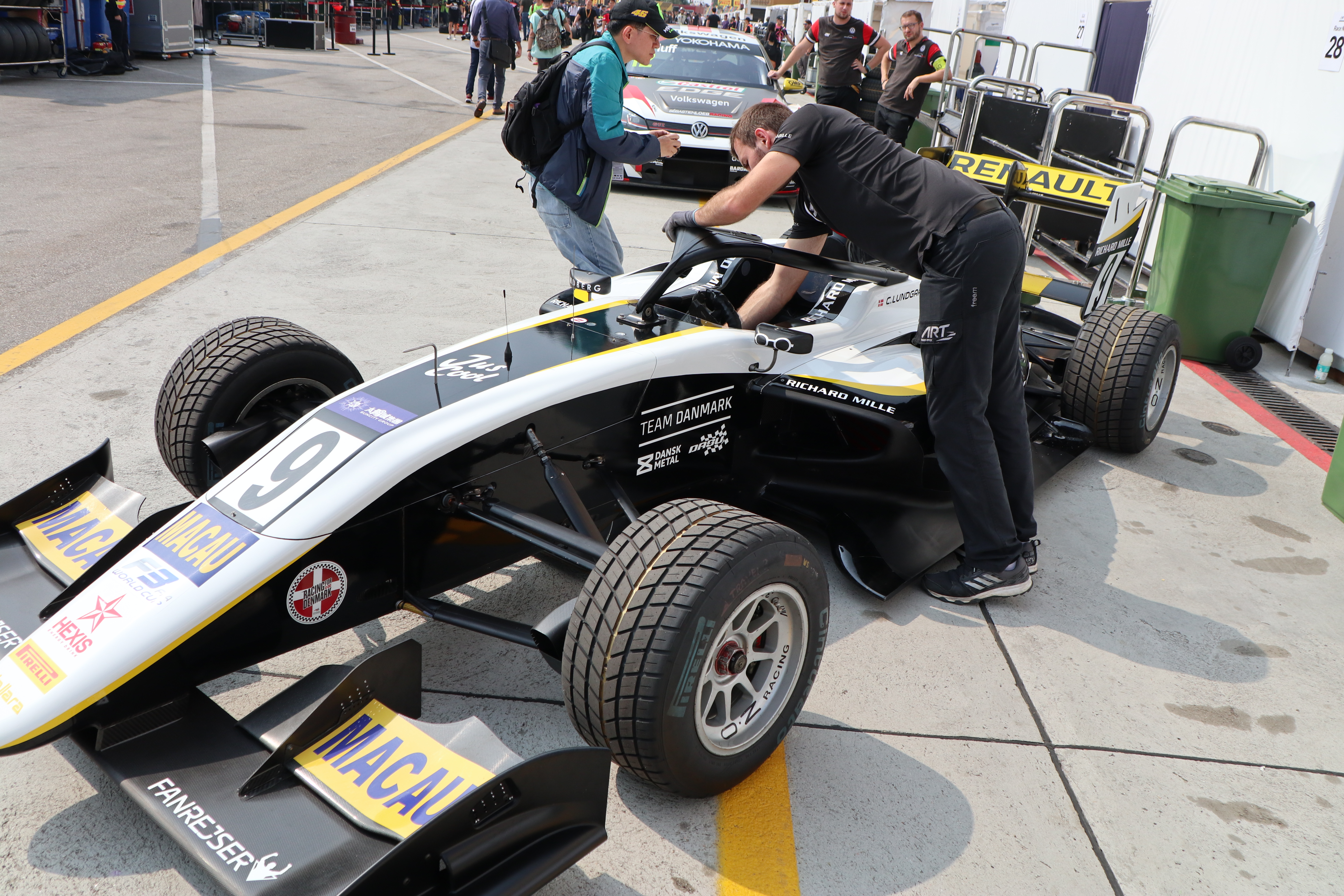
A closer look at an F3 2019.

The chassis is largely identical to the GP3/16 chassis but with a few tweaks as a major facelift and more longer length than GP3/16. Modifications to the chassis include a new front end with a range of suspension setup possibilities and anti-intrusion side panels as part of a push to improve safety.

The chassis also features the "halo" cockpit protection device, a wishbone-shaped frame mounted to the monocoque designed to deflect debris away from a driver's head in the case of an accident.

The rear wing still incorporates the Drag Reduction Systems (DRS) rear wing flap in a purpose for overtaking maneuver assist.

=== Engine package ===
The F3 2019 carries over the same 3.4 L (207 cu in) V6 naturally-aspirated engine developed by Mecachrome Motorsport that powered its predecessor, the GP3/16, but the power output is slightly reduced from 300 kW (400 bhp) to 280 kW (380 bhp).

=== Tyres ===
Pirelli would remain as preferred official tyre partner and supplier of FIA Formula 3 Championship from 2019 season onwards. The tyre sizes and layouts were same as Dallara GP3/10, Dallara GP3/13 and Dallara GP3/16 tyre designs and thus kept the traditional 13-inch wheel rims.

== See also ==
- Dallara F3 2025
