= Mecachrome V634 engine =

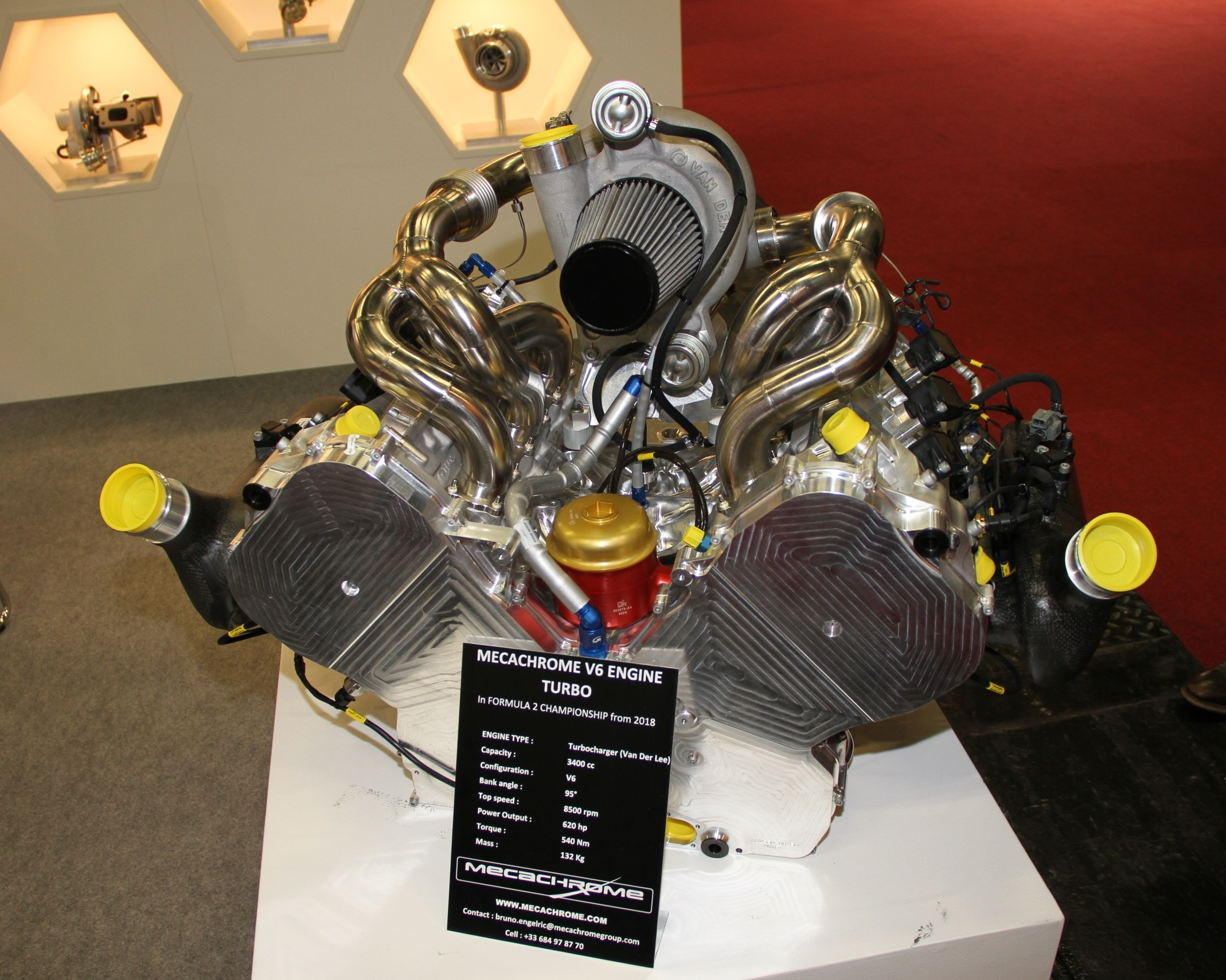

Overview
- Manufacturer: (France) Mecachrome (in collaboration with Teos Engineering)
- Production: 2015–present

Layout
- Configuration: 95° V6
- Displacement: 3.396 L (207 cu in)
- Cylinder bore: 96 mm (3.78 in)
- Piston stroke: 78.2 mm (3.08 in)
- Cylinder block material: Aluminum alloy
- Cylinder head material: Aluminum alloy
- Valvetrain: 24-valve, DOHC, four-valves per cylinder

Combustion
- Turbocharger: Naturally-aspirated (Formula 3), single-turbocharged (Formula 2 and World Endurance Championship)
- Fuel system: Gasoline direct fuel injection
- Management: Magneti Marelli Marvel 8 ECU/GCU including data logging system
- Fuel type: Elf LMS 89.6/99.6/101.6/102 RON (2016-2022) unleaded later Aramco (2023-present) sustainable fuels
- Oil system: Dry sump

Output
- Power output: 380–650 hp (283–485 kW)
- Torque output: 250–490 lb⋅ft (339–664 N⋅m)

Dimensions
- Dry weight: 291 lb (132 kg)

Chronology
- Predecessor: Mecachrome V8108 GP2 V8

The Mecachrome V634 engine (also known as Mecachrome Formula 2 V6) is a 3.4-litre, turbocharged or naturally-aspirated, V6 racing engine, designed, developed and produced by Mecachrome, and is used in the FIA Formula 2 Championship, FIA Formula 3 Championship, and the World Endurance Championship.

== Formula 3 engine ==
=== First generation (second-generation overall) ===
The series will remain using the 3.4-litre V6 naturally-aspirated direct-injected engines supplied by Mecachrome until at least the 2021 season due to FIA Formula 3 Championship not being interested in a turbocharged engine. The horsepower will be scaled down from 400 to 380 hp (298 to 283 kW).

Mecachrome V634 F3 V6 engines were crated and shipped to all FIA Formula 3 Championship teams on a serial-number basis as determined by the FIA to ensure equality and fairness in distribution.

==== Fuel and lubricants components ====
All Formula 3 cars currently use ordinary unleaded racing gasoline as fuel (similar to commercial vehicle unleaded street gasoline), which has been the de facto standard in third tier single-seater formula racing since the introduction of GP3 Series in 2010. Current Elf LMS 102 RON unleaded gasoline resembles ordinary unleaded gasoline but produces better mileage while being more environmentally-friendly and safer than other fuels. Since 2019, Elf exclusively continues providing the LMS 102 RON unleaded fuel and also Elf HTX 840 0W-40 lubricants for all FIA Formula 3 Championship cars.

== Formula 2 engine ==
The V634 Turbo engine is a 3.4 litres (207 cubic inches) V6 turbocharged direct injection four-stroke piston Otto cycle 620 hp fuel-efficient engine developed and built by Mecachrome, and maintained by Teos Engineering. The engine was unveiled in 2017 along with the new Dallara F2 2018 chassis. Dutch turbocharger company Van Der Lee Turbo Systems currently supplies the turbochargers for all FIA Formula 2 Championship engines.

The valve train is a dual overhead camshaft configuration with four valves per cylinder. The crankshaft is made of alloy steel, with five main bearing caps. The pistons are forged aluminium alloy, while the connecting rods are machined alloy steel. The electronic engine management system is supplied by Magneti Marelli, firing a CDI ignition system. The engine lubrication is a dry-sump type, cooled by a single water pump.

The all-new engine fuel delivery system is gasoline direct injection instead of traditional electronic indirect injection. The power output of all-new FIA Formula 2 engine was increased from 612 to 620 hp (456 to 462 kW; 620 to 629 PS). Mecachrome will continue providing new FIA Formula 2 engines from the 2018 season and beyond. The Mecachrome V634 Turbo engine is rev limited down to 8,750 rpm and weighs up to 132 kg (291 lb) including turbocharger. The firing ignition of the Mecachrome V634 Turbo engine is revolutionary digital inductive. The fuel-mass flow restrictor rate of the second-generation FIA Formula 2 Championship engine is roughly rated at 105 kg/h (231 lb/h).

The Mecachrome V634 Turbo 3.4-litre single-turbocharged direct-injected Mecachrome V6 engine is an evolution of the GP3 engine, which is the solely supplied engine for the FIA Formula 2 Championship. With the addition of a single turbo, the engine underwent rigorous dyno testing, ahead of its racing debut. The Mecachrome V634 Turbo engines sells for up to €67,000 per unit by leasing and rebuilding.

The current second-generation FIA Formula 2 engine allocation is limited to one per season and lasts up to 8,000 kilometres (5,000 miles) after being rebuilt. Mid-season engine changes, including during race weekends, are banned and may result in a grid penalty for the session.

=== Turbocharger ===
Turbochargers were introduced from the start of 2018 season. The turbo configuration is single-turbocharged and produces up to 1.5 bar (22 psi) of boost pressure. Dutch turbocharger company Van Der Lee Turbo Systems currently supplies the turbochargers for all FIA Formula 2 Championship all-new engines using the MT134-50120 model. The turbocharger spin limit is 130,000 rpm but cannot exceed 125,000 rpm due to lower turbo boost pressure.

=== Fuel and lubricants components ===
All Formula 2 cars currently use ordinary unleaded racing gasoline as fuel (similar to commercial vehicle unleaded street gasoline), which has been the de facto standard in second tier single-seater formula racing since the introduction of GP2 Series in 2005. Current Elf LMS 102 RON unleaded gasoline resembles ordinary unleaded gasoline but produces better mileage while being environmental-friendly and safer than leaded fuels. Since 2005 GP2 Series season, Elf exclusively continues providing the LMS 102 RON unleaded fuel and also Elf HTX 840 0W-40 lubricants for all FIA Formula 2 Championship cars due to in fact of Mecachrome's long-term technical partnership with Elf.

== Ginetta LMP1 engine ==
For the Ginetta G60-LT-P1 race car to be racing in the LMP1 category. An updated engine was developed with now direct injection opposed to the original port injection F2 engine and a larger turbocharger variant. Originally designed to have a output close to 800hp but power was significantly reduced in its first LeMans 24 outing to improve reliability.

== Alpine LMDh engine ==
For the Alpine A424 LMDh racecar. A new version of the V634 DI engine was developed by Mecachrome with support from Alpine's Viry-Châtillon team. The new endurance spec engine is making 675hp and has a redline of 9000rpm.

== Applications ==
- Dallara GP3/16
- Dallara F2 2018
- Dallara F2 2024
- Dallara F3 2019
- Dallara F3 2025
- Ginetta G60-LT-P1
- Alpine A424
