= Dallara F2 2024 =

Open-wheel racing car

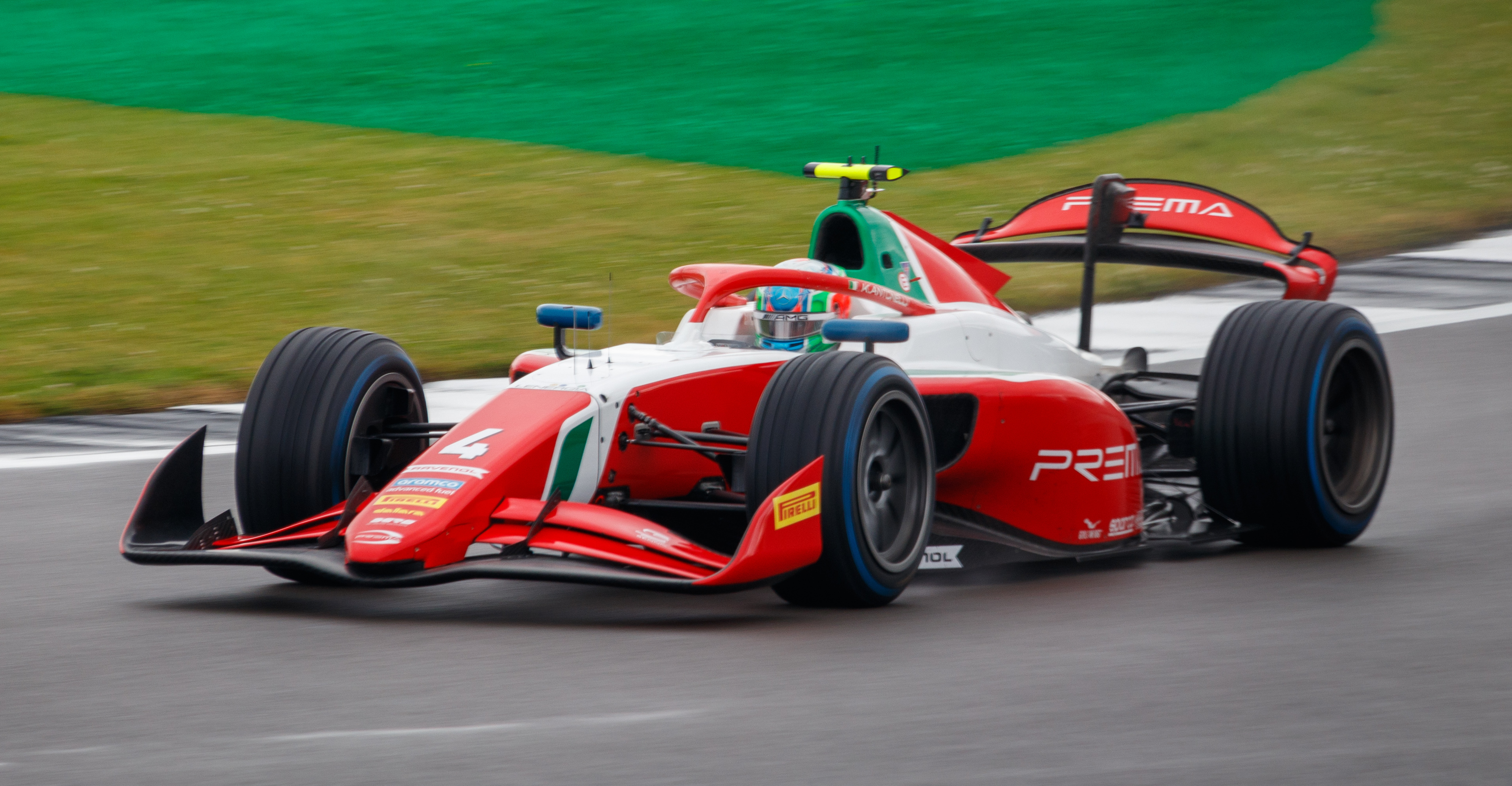
- Kimi Antonelli driving an F2 2024 during the 2024 Silverstone Formula 2 round
- Category: FIA Formula 2
- Constructor: Dallara
- Designer: Pierre-Alain Michot
- Predecessor: Dallara F2 2018

Technical specifications
- Chassis: Sandwich Carbon fibre/Aluminium monocoque with honeycomb structure
- Suspension (front): Pushrod operated double steel wishbones with twin dampers and torsion bars suspension`
- Suspension (rear): Pushrod operated double steel wishbones with twin dampers and spring suspension
- Length: 5,284 mm (208 in)
- Width: 1,900 mm (75 in)
- Height: 1,097 mm (43 in)
- Wheelbase: 3,135 mm (123 in)
- Engine: Mecachrome V634T 3.4 L (207 cu in) V6 single-turbo charged longitudinally mounted in a rear-engined, rear-wheel drive format
- Transmission: Hewland 6-speed + 1 reverse sequential semi-automatic paddle-shift limited-slip differential
- Power: 620 hp (462 kW) @ 8,750 rpm, 583 N⋅m (430 ft⋅lbf) torque
- Weight: 795 kg (1,753 lb) including driver and fuel
- Fuel: Aramco Advanced 55% sustainable fuel
- Lubricants: Aramco Orizon
- Brakes: Carbone Industrie carbon brake discs and pads with Brembo six-piston calipers
- Tyres: Pirelli P Zero dry slick and Pirelli Cinturato treaded wet tyres O.Z. Racing 18" wheels
- Clutch: ZF Sachs carbon clutch

Competition history
- Debut: 2024 Sakhir Formula 2 round
- Teams' Championships: Invicta Racing (2024, 2025)
- Drivers' Championships: Gabriel Bortoleto (2024); Leonardo Fornaroli (2025)

The Dallara F2 2024 is an open-wheel racing car developed by Italian manufacturer Dallara for use in the FIA Formula 2 Championship, a feeder-series for Formula One. The F2 2024 is the third car used by the FIA Formula 2 Championship and was introduced for the 2024 season as a replacement for the Dallara F2 2018. As Formula 2 is a spec series, the F2 2024 is used by all teams and drivers.

According to Dallara, the chassis is intended for use until 2029.

== Development ==
The design of the F2 2024 is based on the 2022 Formula One technical regulations, utilising similar aerodynamic concepts including the use of ground effect to help produce closer racing and better prepare junior drivers for Formula One machinery. In practice, this forced teams to change their setup approach, as the new floor constituted a larger percentage of the car's overall downforce than before.

Though many of the F2 2024's parts were carried over from the preceding F2 2018 to keep running costs down for racing teams, the car received reinforcements in safety, with updates to its nose, survival cell, and roll hoop to withstand higher forces in crashes. For ergonomics and accessibility, the cockpit was revised to fit drivers of any stature, and the suspension geometry was updated to require less effort to steer the car. Mecachrome's 3.4 L (207 cu in) V634 turbocharged direct-injected V6 engine was retained from the previous car, continuing to use 55% sustainable fuel from Saudi Aramco.

The F2 2024 was revealed by Dallara ahead of the 2023 Monza Formula 2 round, with a shakedown by former Formula 2 driver Tatiana Calderón at the Autodromo Riccardo Paletti in Varano.
