= Dallara GP3 cars =

Open-wheel formula racing car built by Dallara

Dallara GP3/10
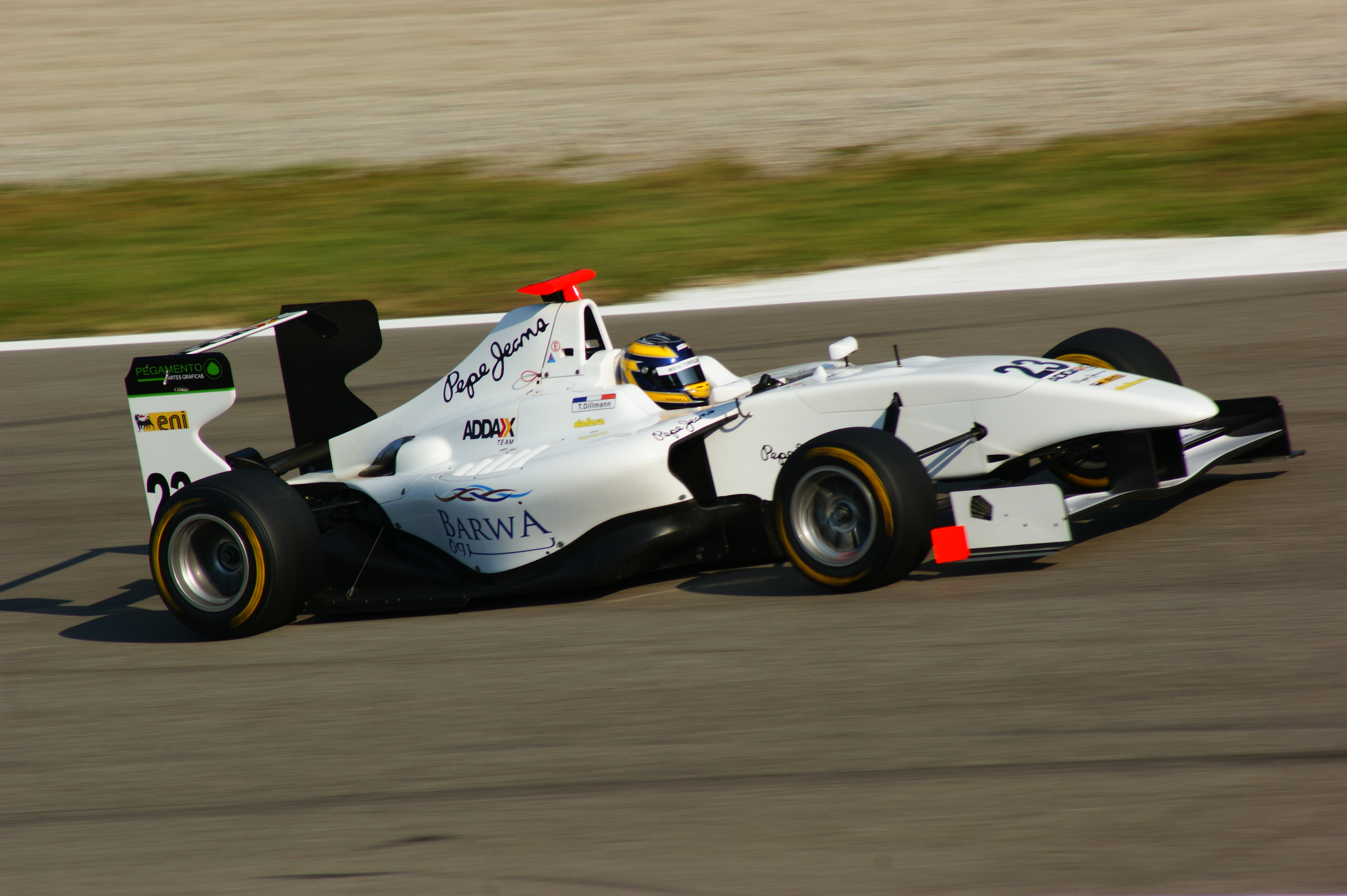
- Category: GP3 Series
- Constructor: Dallara
- Successor: Dallara GP3/13

Technical specifications
- Chassis: Sandwich Carbon/aluminium honeycomb structure designed by Dallara
- Suspension (front): Double steel wishbones, pushrod operated, twin dampers, helicoidally spring suspension
- Suspension (rear): Same as front
- Length: 4,471 mm (176 in)
- Width: 1,885 mm (74 in)
- Height: 1,063 mm (42 in)
- Wheelbase: 2,780 mm (109 in)
- Engine: Race-tuned Renault B20F 1,998 cc (121.9 cu in) inline-4 single-turbocharged, 6,500 rpm limited mid-mounted, rear-wheel-drive
- Torque: 240 N⋅m (180 lbf⋅ft)
- Transmission: Hewland 6 forward + 1 reverse sequential paddle shift
- Power: 280 hp (209 kW)
- Weight: 630 kg (1,389 lb) (including driver)
- Fuel: Elf LMS 89.6 MON, 101.6 RON unleaded
- Tyres: Pirelli P Zero; O.Z. racing wheels front rims 13” x 10” wide rear rims 13” x 12.5” wide

Competition history
- Notable entrants: All GP3 Series teams
- Notable drivers: All GP3 Series drivers
- Debut: 2010 Catalunya GP3 round
- Last event: 2012 Monza GP3 round
| Races | Wins | Poles | F/Laps |
|---|---|---|---|
| 48 | 48 | 48 | 48 |
- Constructors' Championships: 3
- Drivers' Championships: 3

The Dallara GP3 cars were chassis for the GP3 Series as a feeder series for the parent GP2 series where Italian manufacturer Dallara also designs the chassis.

== GP3/10 ==
The Dallara GP3/10 was a first generation car in the series. It debuted in May 2010 at Catalunya and had its final run in September 2012 in Monza. During its run, it claimed championship titles for Esteban Gutiérrez in 2010, Valtteri Bottas in 2011 and finally Mitch Evans in 2012 with ART Grand Prix winning the teams title on all accounts. It also helped 9 drivers successfully graduate into the GP2 parent series. Both Gutiérrez and Bottas made their F1 debuts in the 2013 Formula 1 season with Sauber and Williams respectively.

Each team was allowed to run three separate GP3/10's, and with a total of ten different teams and thirty cars on the grid, it was one of the largest grids in motor-sport making it a rather unstable class of racing. With the chassis to be taken over by the GP3/13 in 2013, the number of cars on track was limited to twenty seven.

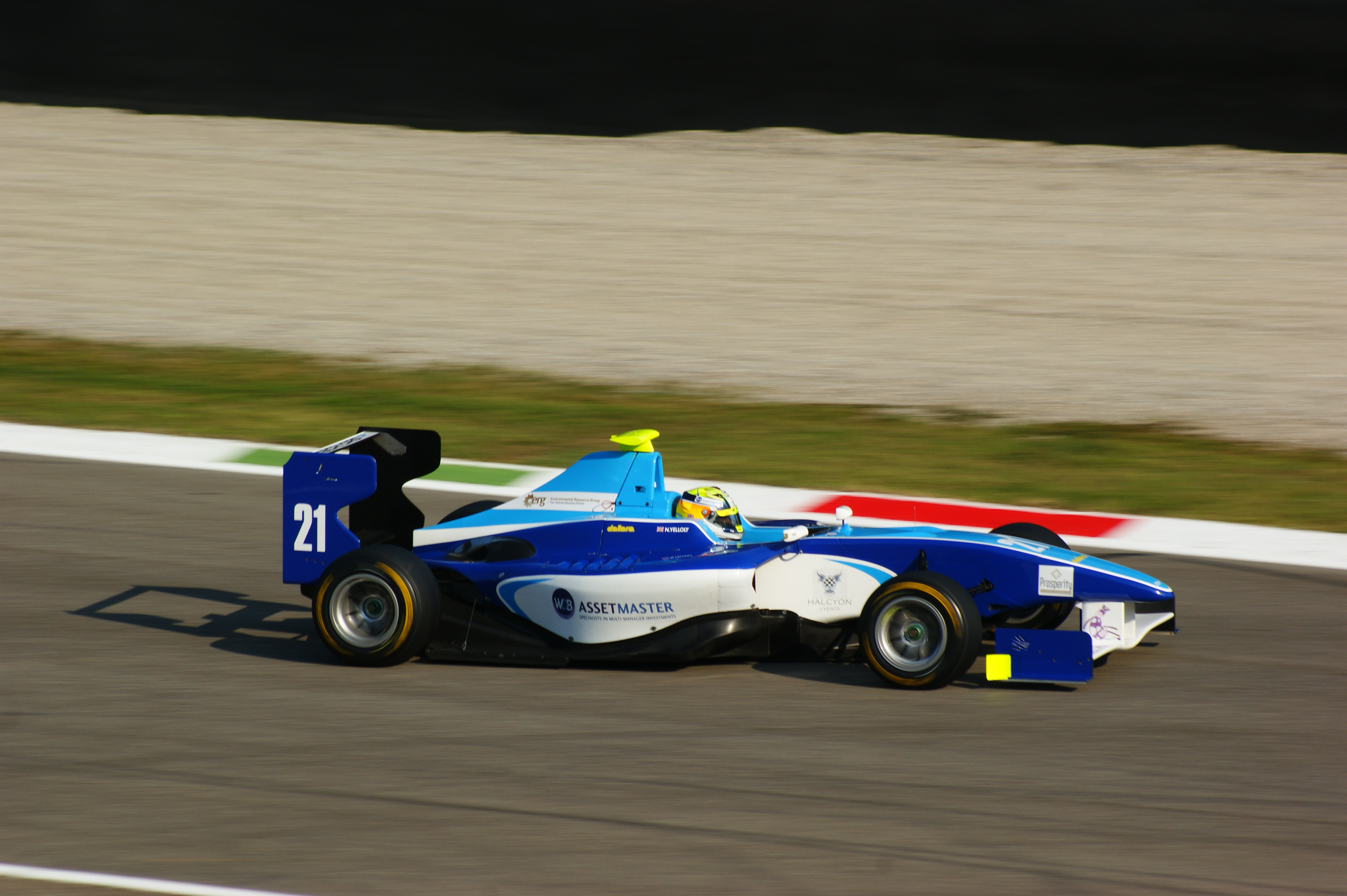
Nick Yelloly driving at Monza in 2011.

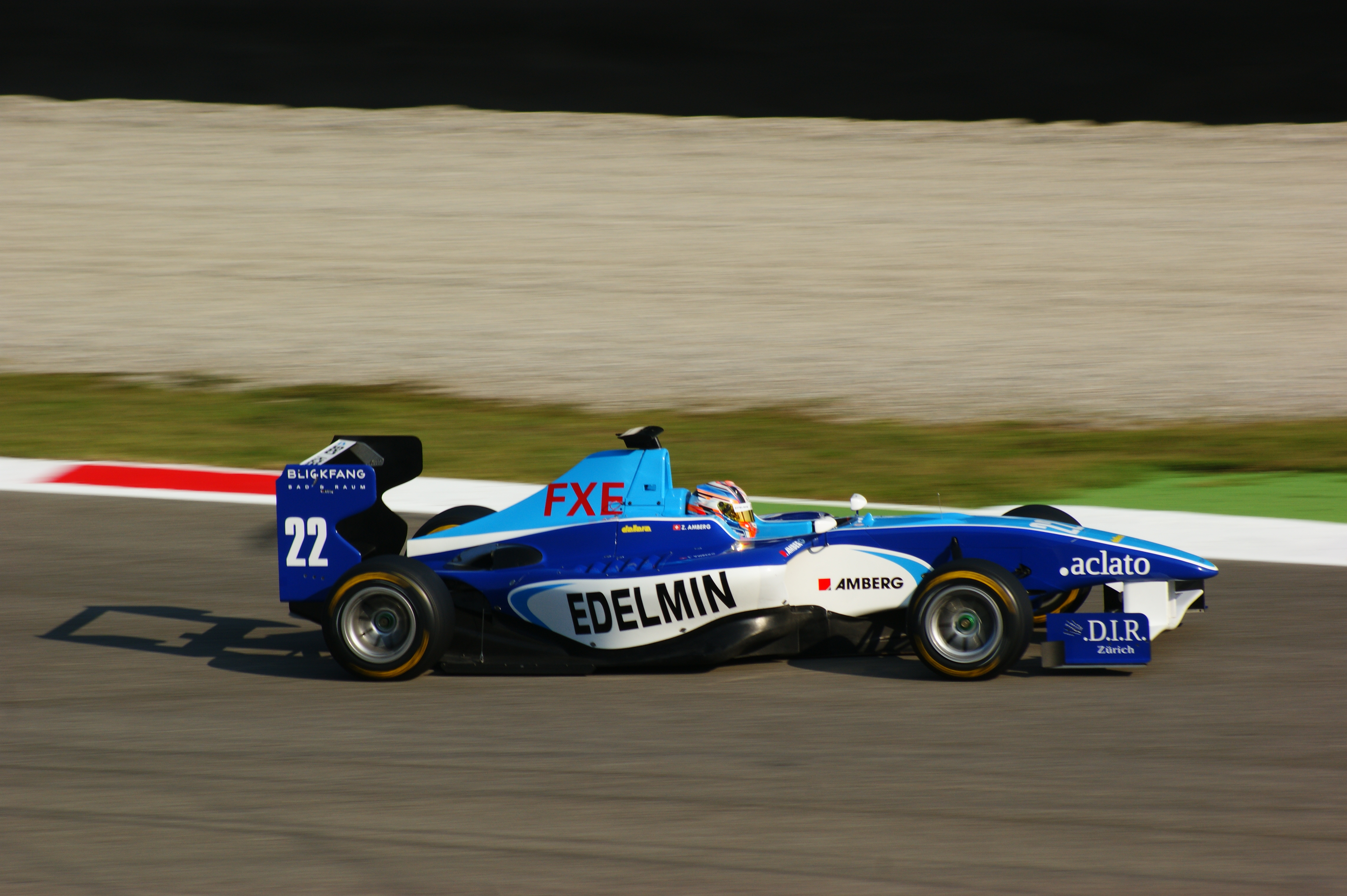
Zoël Amberg driving at Monza in 2011.

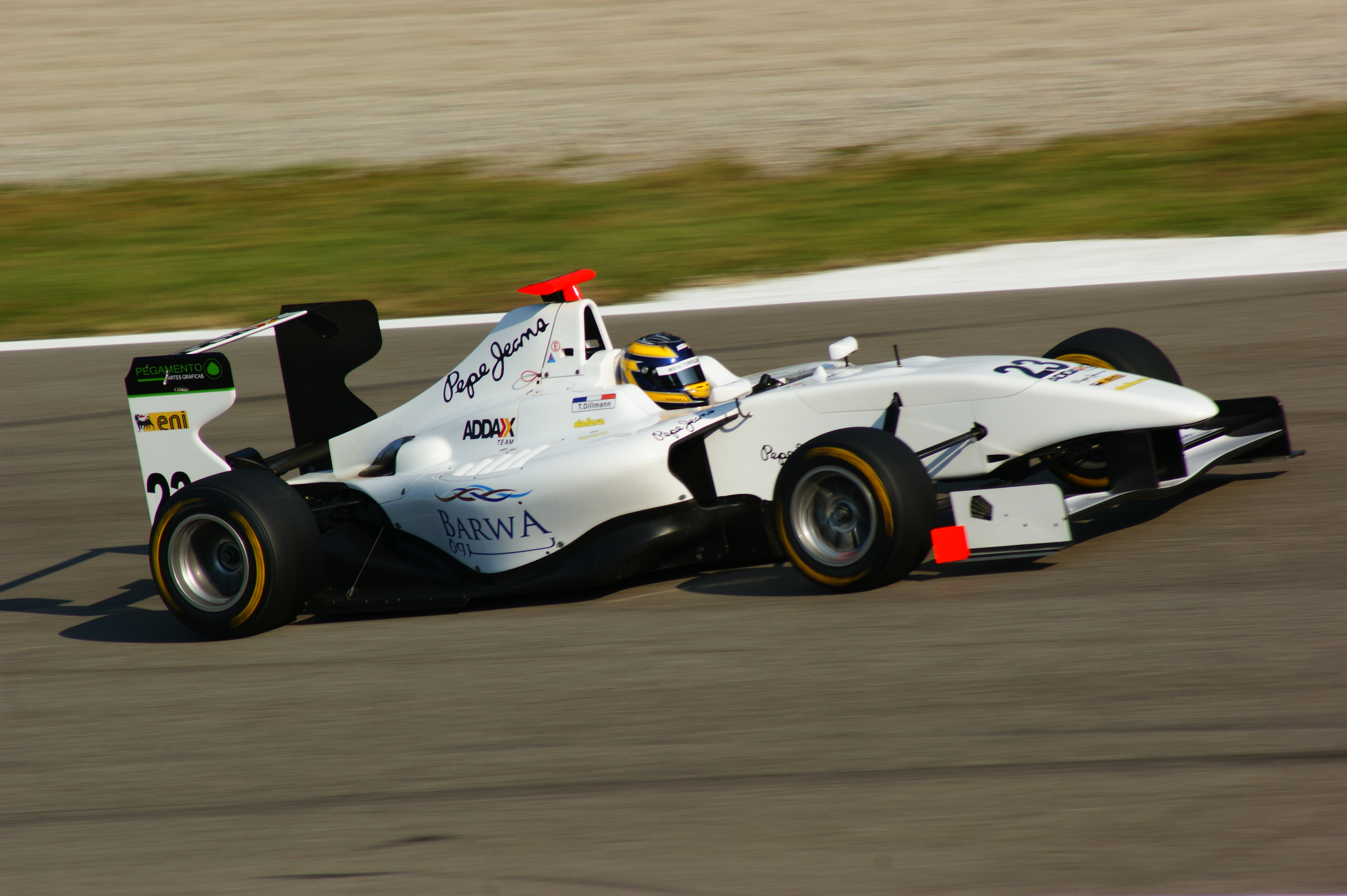
Tom Dillmann driving at Monza in 2011.

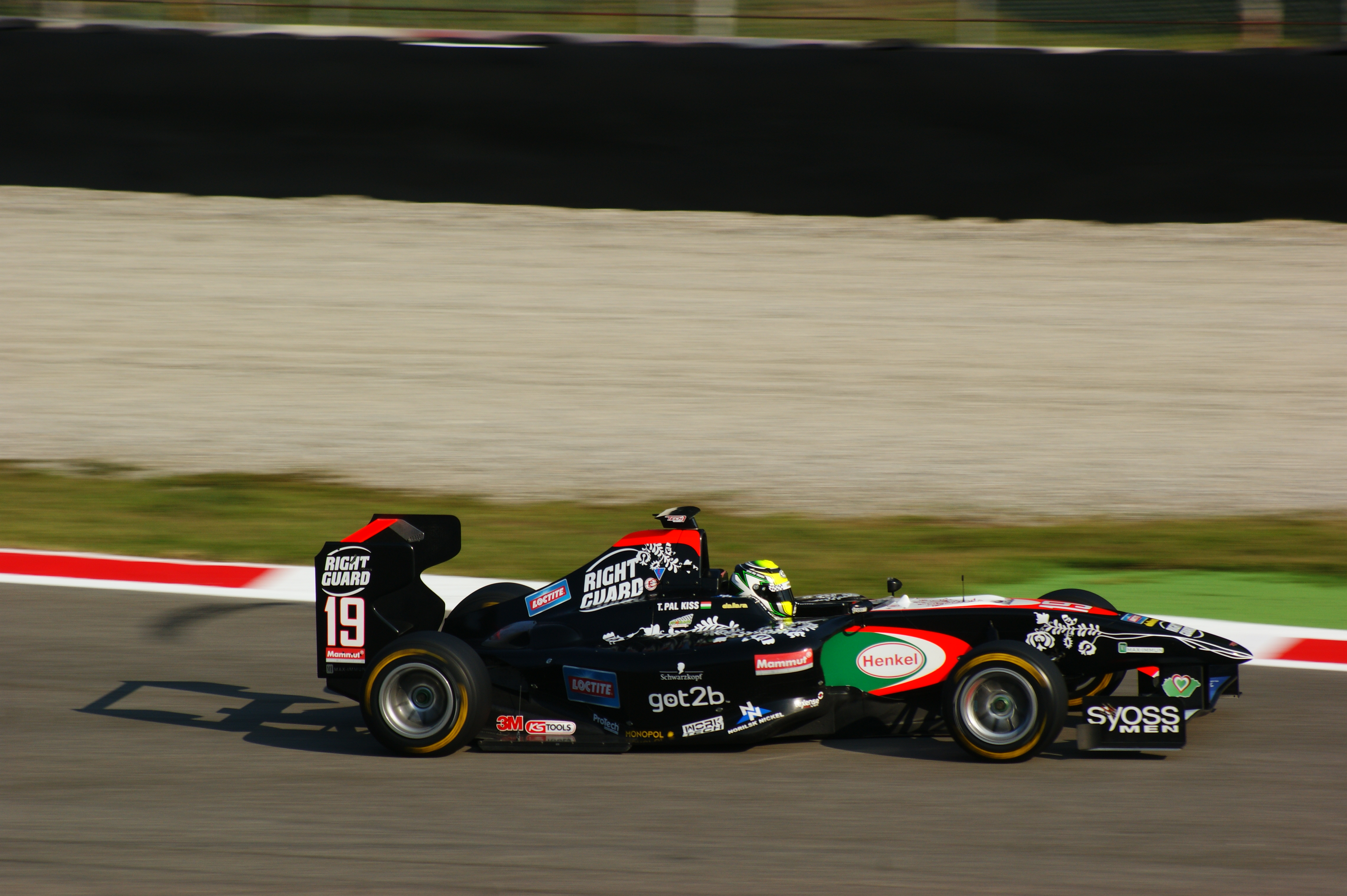
Tamás Pál Kiss driving at Monza in 2011.

== GP3/13 ==
Dallara GP3/13
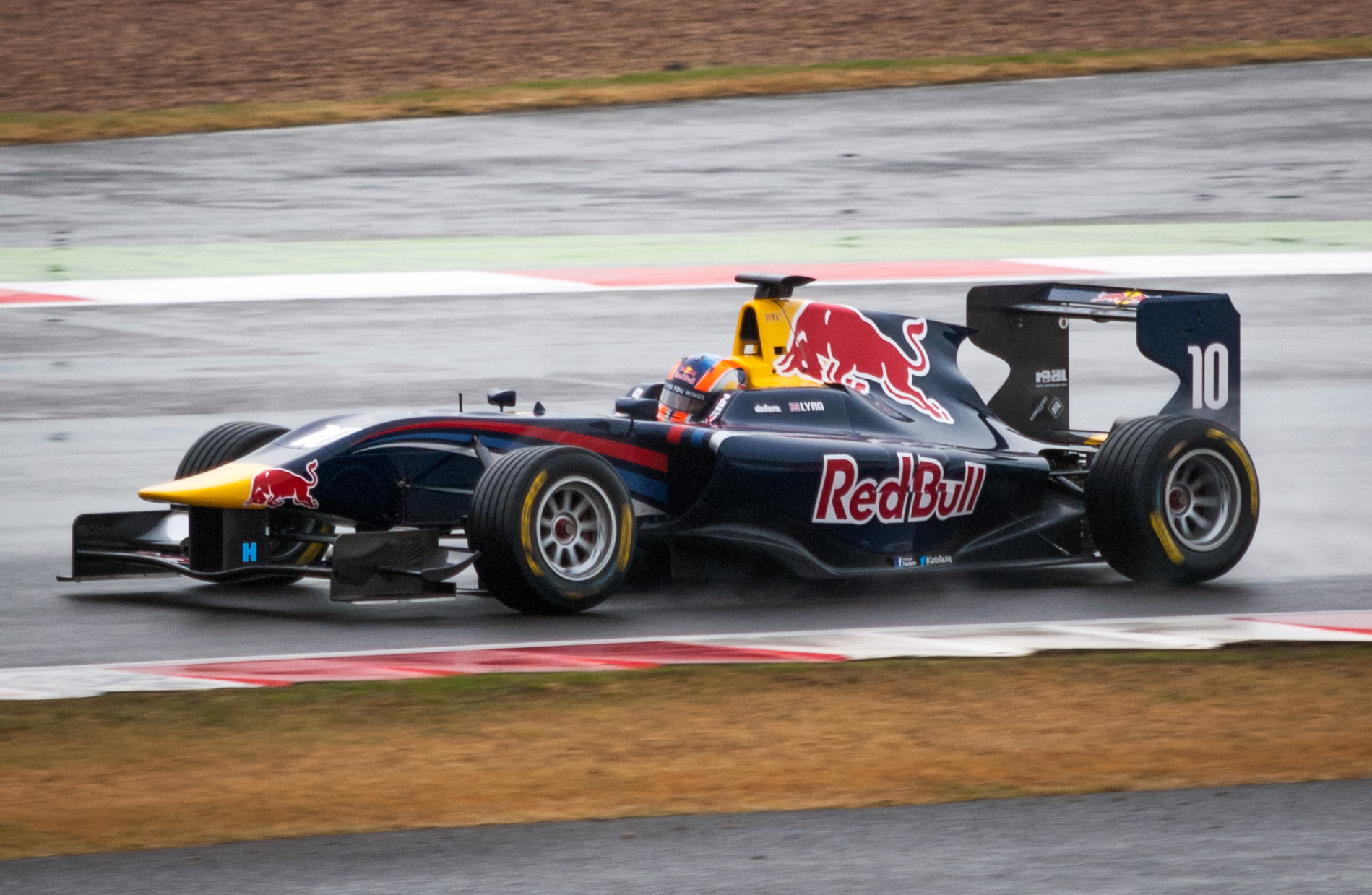
- Category: GP3 Series
- Constructor: Dallara
- Designers: Luca Pignacca and Andrea Toso
- Predecessor: Dallara GP3/10
- Successor: Dallara GP3/16

Technical specifications
- Chassis: Sandwich Carbon/aluminium honeycomb structure designed by Dallara
- Suspension (front): Double steel wishbones, pushrod operated, twin dampers, helicoidally spring suspension
- Suspension (rear): same as front
- Length: 4,480 mm (176 in)
- Width: 1,872 mm (74 in)
- Height: 1,043 mm (41 in)
- Wheelbase: 2,880 mm (113 in)
- Engine: AER P57 3.4 L (210 cu in) naturally aspirated, rear mid-mounted, rear-wheel-drive
- Torque: 430 N⋅m (317 lb⋅ft)
- Transmission: Hewland 6 forward + 1 reverse sequential paddle shift
- Power: 400 bhp (298 kW; 406 PS)
- Weight: 630 kg (1,388.9 lb) (including driver)
- Fuel: Elf LMS 89.6 MON, 101.6 RON unleaded
- Lubricants: Elf HTX 840
- Tyres: Pirelli P Zero; O.Z. racing wheels front rims 13” x 10” widerear rims 13” x 12.5”

Competition history
- Notable entrants: All GP3 Series teams
- Notable drivers: All GP3 Series drivers
- Debut: 2013 Catalunya GP3 round
- Last event: 2015 Yas Marina GP3 round
| Races | Wins | Poles | F/Laps |
|---|---|---|---|
| 52 | 52 | 52 | 52 |
- Constructors' Championships: 3
- Drivers' Championships: 3

The Dallara GP3/13 was the second generation in the series. The GP3/13 made its debut at the start of the 2013 season in Barcelona and it was in use for three seasons before being replaced by the Dallara GP3/16.

The 280bhp turbo-charged inline-4 engine that was used in the Dallara GP3/10 between 2010 and 2012 was upgraded to a 400bhp 3.4 litre (207 cu in) naturally-aspirated V6 unit, with initial estimations suggesting that the chassis would be up to three seconds per lap faster than its predecessor, which proved to be accurate during pre-season testing at the Autódromo do Estoril.

== GP3/16 ==
Dallara GP3/16
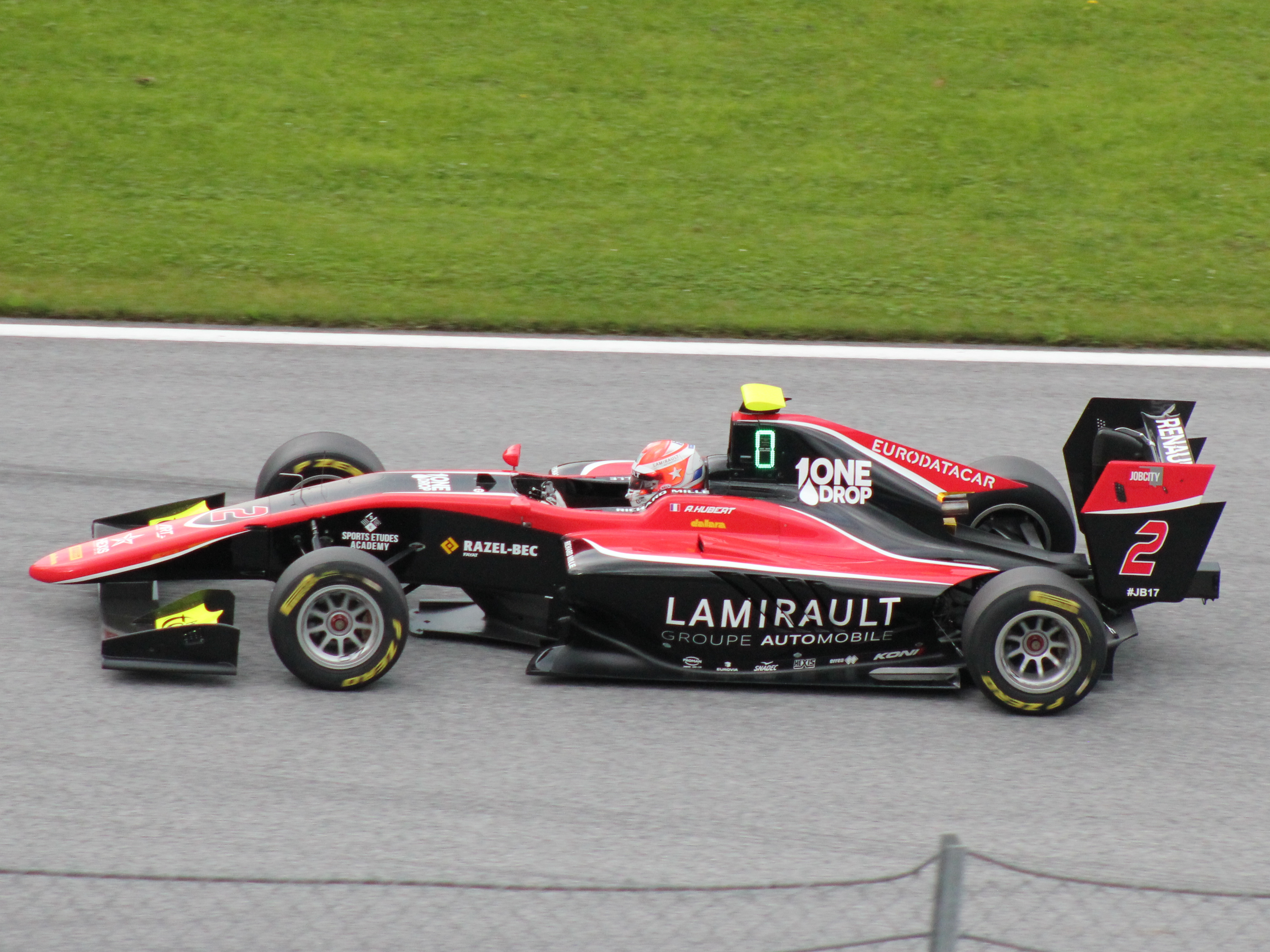
- Category: GP3 Series
- Constructor: Dallara
- Designers: Luca Pignacca and Andrea Toso
- Predecessor: Dallara GP3/13
- Successor: Dallara F3 2019

Technical specifications
- Chassis: Sandwich Carbon/aluminium honeycomb structure
- Suspension (front): Double steel wishbones, pushrod operated, twin dampers, helicoidally spring suspension
- Suspension (rear): same as front
- Length: 4,580 mm (180 in) in 2016 later 4,620 mm (182 in) in 2017-2018
- Width: 1,872 mm (74 in)
- Height: 1,043 mm (41 in)
- Wheelbase: 2,880 mm (113 in)
- Engine: Mecachrome V634 3.4 L (210 cu in) V6 95 degree naturally aspirated, rear mid-mounted, rear-wheel-drive
- Torque: 340 N⋅m (250 lb⋅ft)
- Transmission: Hewland 6 forward + 1 reverse sequential paddle shift
- Power: 400 bhp (300 kW; 410 PS)
- Weight: 661 kg (1,457 lb) (including driver)
- Fuel: Elf LMS 89.6 MON, 101.6 RON unleaded
- Lubricants: Elf HTX 840
- Tyres: Pirelli P Zero (dry) and Cinturato (wet); O.Z. racing wheels front rims 13” x 10” wide rear rims 13” x 12.5”

Competition history
- Notable entrants: All GP3 Series teams
- Notable drivers: All GP3 Series drivers
- Debut: 2016 Catalunya GP3 round
- Last event: 2018 Yas Marina GP3 round
| Races | Wins | Poles | F/Laps |
|---|---|---|---|
| 51 | 51 | 26 | 51 |
- Constructors' Championships: 3
- Drivers' Championships: 3

The Dallara GP3/16 was the third generation of the series. The GP3/16 made its debut at the start of the 2016 season in Barcelona, and remained in use until the final season of the GP3 Series in 2018. The Dallara GP3/16 chassis was designed to replace the GP3/13 chassis in the 2016 season. Dallara began the development, design and construction of the GP3/16 chassis in mid-2014. The first chassis began assembly in July 2015, and was completed in September.

=== Chassis ===
The Dallara GP3/16 car has a more radical design with the all-new F1-style lower nose, original rear wing, air ventilation in both sidepods and also engine cover. The "shark fin" engine cover was replaced by a more conventional design. The rear wing of all Dallara GP3/16 cars were slightly updated for the 2017 season due to the introduction of the Drag Reduction System (DRS) used in Formula One and Formula 2.

=== Engine package ===
The GP3/16 used a 3.4 L (207 cu in) V6 naturally-aspirated direct-injected fuel-efficient engine developed by Mecachrome Motorsport, replacing the P57 engine developed by Advanced Engine Research (AER) that was used in its predecessor, the GP3/13.

=== Aerodynamics ===
The Dallara GP3/16 car would incorporate the Drag Reduction Systems (DRS) rear wing flap for the first time since 2017 season in a purpose for overtaking maneuver assist.
