= 1999 Euro Open by Nissan =

Seasons
- ← 1998 2000 →

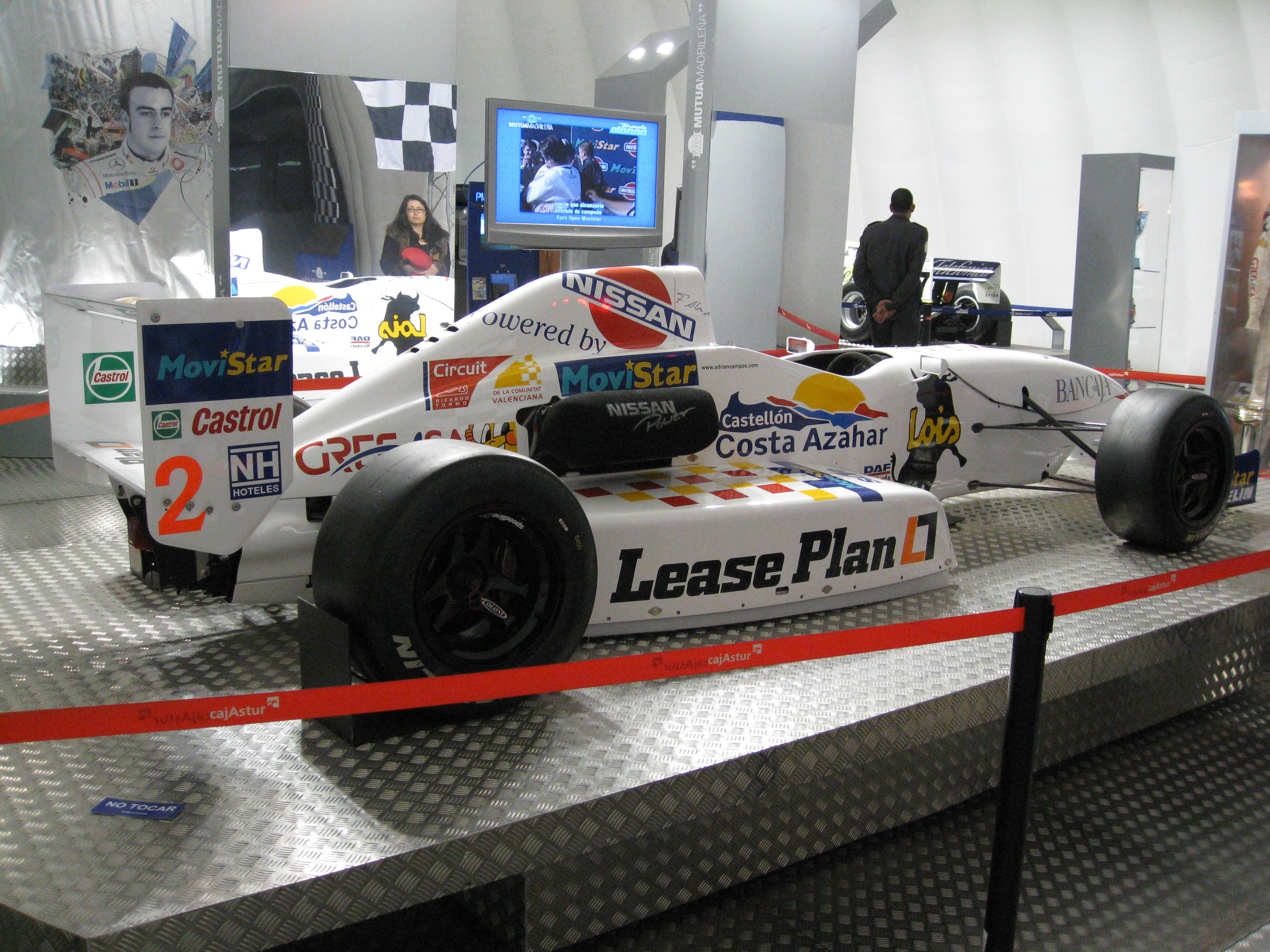
The car in which Fernando Alonso won the title at the final race; overhauling Manuel Gião by just seven points.

The 1999 Euro Open by Nissan was contested over 8 race weekends/16 rounds. In this one-make formula all drivers had to use Coloni CN1 chassis and Nissan engines. 16 teams and 36 drivers competed.

== Teams and Drivers ==
Team	No.	Driver	Rounds
(Spain) Campos Motorsport	1	(Spain) Antonio García	All
(Spain) Campos Motorsport	2	(Spain) Fernando Alonso	All
(Italy) Scuderia Famà	3	(Portugal) Manuel Giao	All
(Italy) Scuderia Famà	4	(Switzerland) Joël Camathias	All
(Italy) EC Motorsport	5	(Spain) Ángel Burgueño	All
(Italy) EC Motorsport	6	(Italy) Roberto Toninelli	All
(Italy) EC Motorsport	7	(Italy) Riccardo Ronchi	All
(France) G-TEC	8	(Germany) Steffen Widmann	1-3
(France) G-TEC	9	(France) Laurent Delahaye	All
(France) G-TEC	10	(Belgium) David Sterckx	1-3
(France) G-TEC	11	(Spain) Rafael Sarandeses	All
(France) G-TEC	15	(Spain) Fernando Navarrete	4-5, 7-8
(France) G-TEC	35	(United Kingdom) Greg Canton	6
(Spain) Promodrive Racing	12	(Argentina) Sebastián Martino	1-4
(Spain) Promodrive Racing	33	(United Kingdom) Chris Clark	5-8
(Spain) Glückmann Racing	14	(Spain) Sergio García	1-2
(Spain) Glückmann Racing	29	(France) Frederic Gosparini	2-4, 6
(Spain) Glückmann Racing	37	(United Kingdom) Jamie Spence	6-7
(Spain) Glückmann Racing	38	(Spain) Abimael Tomeno	7-8
(Spain) Saturn Motorsport	16	(Spain) Lluis Llobet	1-3, 7-8
(Spain) Saturn Motorsport	17	(Spain) David Bosch	1-4
(Spain) Saturn Motorsport	18	(Spain) Víctor Fernández	1
(Liechtenstein) Formax Racing Team	19	(Hungary) Tamás Illés	1, 3-5, 7-8
(Spain) M-Tac	20	(Spain) Ramón Caus	1-2
(Italy) Venturini Racing	21	(Italy) Davide Campana	1-4
(Italy) Venturini Racing	22	(Portugal) Rui Aguas	All
(Italy) Venturini Racing	39	(Italy) Michelle Gasparini	5-8
(Spain) Bigi Motorsport	23	(Argentina) Federico Sanz	1-2
(Italy) Auto in Motorsport	26	(Italy) Niki Cadei	All
(Italy) Auto in Motorsport	27	(Italy) Giuseppe Burlotti	All
(Italy) Auto in Motorsport	28	(Italy) Andrea Belicchi	1-5
(Italy) Tecno Dinamica Attiva	30	(Italy) Giorgio Pantano	4-6
(Spain) Azteca Motorsport	32	(Sweden) Frederic Haglung	8
(Italy) Vergani Racing	40	(South Africa) Tomas Scheckter	8
(Spain) Movistar Racing Fórmula	55	(Spain) Miguel Ángel de Castro	All
(Spain) Movistar Racing Fórmula	77	(Spain) Balba González-Camino	All

== Race calendar ==
Round		Location	Circuit	Date	Pole position	Fastest lap	Winning driver	Winning team	Report
1	R1	Albacete, Spain	(Spain) Circuito de Albacete	March 27	(Argentina) Sebastián Martino	(Spain) Antonio García	(Spain) Ángel Burgueño	(Italy) EC Motorsport	Report
1	R2	Albacete, Spain	(Spain) Circuito de Albacete	March 28	(Spain) Ángel Burgueño	(Germany) Steffen Widmann	(Spain) Fernando Alonso	(Spain) Campos Motorsport	Report
2	R1	Jerez, Spain	(Spain) Circuito de Jerez	April 10	(Portugal) Manuel Gião	(Spain) Ángel Burgueño	(Portugal) Manuel Gião	(Italy) Scuderia Famà	Report
2	R2	Jerez, Spain	(Spain) Circuito de Jerez	April 11	(Spain) Ángel Burgueño	(Portugal) Rui Aguas	(Spain) Ángel Burgueño	(Italy) EC Motorsport	Report
3	R1	San Sebastián, Spain	(Spain) Circuito del Jarama	May 15	(Spain) Fernando Alonso	(Spain) Fernando Alonso	(France) Laurent Delahaye	(France) G-Tec	Report
3	R2	San Sebastián, Spain	(Spain) Circuito del Jarama	May 16	(Spain) Fernando Alonso	(France) Laurent Delahaye	(Spain) Fernando Alonso	(Spain) Campos Motorsport	Report
4	R1	Monza, Italy	(Italy) Autodromo Nazionale Monza	June 12	(Spain) Fernando Alonso	(Portugal) Manuel Gião	(Spain) Ángel Burgueño	(Italy) EC Motorsport	Report
4	R2	Monza, Italy	(Italy) Autodromo Nazionale Monza	June 13	(Portugal) Manuel Gião	(Italy) Davide Campana	(Italy) Andrea Belicci	(Italy) Auto in Motorsport	Report
5	R1	San Sebastián, Spain	(Spain) Circuito del Jarama	July 10	(Spain) Fernando Alonso	(France) Laurent Delahaye	(Spain) Rafael Sarandeses	(France) G-Tec	Report
5	R2	San Sebastián, Spain	(Spain) Circuito del Jarama	July 11	(Spain) Antonio García	(Spain) Rafael Sarandeses	(Spain) Antonio García	(Spain) Campos Motorsport	Report
6	R1	(United Kingdom) Castle Donington, UK	(United Kingdom) Donington Park	September 4	(Spain) Fernando Alonso	(Spain) Fernando Alonso	(Spain) Fernando Alonso	(Spain) Campos Motorsport	Report
6	R2	(United Kingdom) Castle Donington, UK	(United Kingdom) Donington Park	September 5	(Spain) Fernando Alonso	(Spain) Fernando Alonso	(Spain) Fernando Alonso	(Spain) Campos Motorsport	Report
7	R1	Barcelona, Spain	(Spain) Circuit de Catalunya	October 2	(Portugal) Manuel Gião	(Portugal) Manuel Gião	(Portugal) Manuel Gião	(Italy) Scuderia Famà	Report
7	R2	Barcelona, Spain	(Spain) Circuit de Catalunya	October 3	(Portugal) Manuel Gião	(Portugal) Manuel Gião	(Spain) Fernando Alonso	(Spain) Campos Motorsport	Report
8	R1	Valencia, Spain	(Spain) Circuito Ricardo Tormo	November 6	(South Africa) Tomas Scheckter	(Spain) Fernando Alonso	(South Africa) Tomas Scheckter	(Italy) Vergani Racing	Report
8	R2	Valencia, Spain	(Spain) Circuito Ricardo Tormo	November 7	(South Africa) Tomas Scheckter	(Spain) Fernando Alonso	(Spain) Fernando Alonso	(Spain) Campos Motorsport	Report

== Final points standings ==
=== Driver ===
For every race the points were awarded: 20 points to the winner, 15 for runner-up, 12 for third place, 10 for fourth place, 8 for fifth place, 6 for sixth place, 4 for seventh place, winding down to 1 point for 10th place. Lower placed drivers did not award points. Additional points were awarded to the driver setting the fastest race lap (2 points). The best 12 race results count, but all additional points count. Three drivers had a point deduction, which are given in ().

- Points System:

Pos	1	2	3	4	5	6	7	8	9	10	FL
Pts	20	15	12	10	8	6	4	3	2	1	2

Pos	Driver	ALB (Spain)		JER (Spain)		JAR (Spain)		MNZ (Italy)		JAR (Spain)		DON (United Kingdom)		CAT (Spain)		VAL (Spain)		Pts
1	(Spain) Fernando Alonso	Ret	1	Ret	DNS	Ret	1	Ret	Ret	2	Ret	1	1	7	1	2	1	164
2	(Portugal) Manuel Gião	3	2	1	3	5	EX	3	12	Ret	8	2	6	1	2	3	4	157
3	(France) Laurent Delahaye	6	Ret	10	5	1	4	2	Ret	3	4	14	5	2	5	4	8	129
4	(Spain) Ángel Burgueño	1	Ret	3	1	Ret	9	1	Ret	5	13	9	Ret	Ret	3	5	3	118
5	(Portugal) Rui Aguas	Ret	16	2	2	2	5	4	Ret	4	3	11	3	Ret	6	7	6	115
6	(Spain) Antonio García	2	15	5	8	4	3	5	Ret	Ret	1	6	2	Ret	DNS	9	5	109
7	(Italy) Giuseppe Burlotti	4	7	13	Ret	8	2	6	3	9	6	5	4	4	12	6	7	94
8	(Spain) Rafael Sarandeses	13	5	11	Ret	6	13	12	8	1	2	7	10	3	16	8	Ret	74
9	(Spain) Miguel Ángel de Castro	5	3	7	Ret	3	Ret	16	DNS	7	7	12	Ret	5	4	13	10	63
10	(Italy) Andrea Belicci	7	4	8	6	Ret	DNS	8	1	13	Ret							46
11	(Italy) Niki Cadei	10	10	15	11	Ret	11	Ret	4	6	5	3	Ret	13	Ret	12	Ret	38
12	(South Africa) Tomas Scheckter															1	2	35
13	(Germany) Steffen Widmann	Ret	18	4	4	7	Ret											26
14	(Italy) Davide Campana	9	Ret	Ret	Ret	9	7	Ret	2									25
15	(Switzerland) Joël Camathias	Ret	6	12	Ret	Ret	DNS	17	13	8	9	Ret	12	6	7	10	11	22
16	(France) Frederic Gosparini			6	7	Ret	6	Ret	DNS			17	Ret					16
17	(Spain) David Bosch	Ret	13	17	12	11	8	7	5									15
18	(United Kingdom) Jamie Spence											4	Ret	10	9			13
19	(Italy) Roberto Toninelli	15	8	16	Ret	13	DNS	10	6	12	14	Ret	11	12	8	11	Ret	13
20	(Italy) Michele Gasparini									14	10	13	7	8	10	15	9	11
21	(Italy) Giorgio Pantano							Ret	10	15	12	8	8					7
22	(Argentina) Sebastián Martino	11	Ret	Ret	DNS	10	10	13	7									6
23	(Spain) Sergio García	8	Ret	9	10													6
24	(United Kingdom) Chris Clark									10	11	10	9	9	13	16	Ret	6
25	(Italy) Riccardo Ronchi	Ret	14	18	13	17	12	9	9	16	15	16	13	11	14	18	12	4
26	(Belgium) David Sterckx	12	9	Ret	9	12	14											4
27	(Spain) Fernando Navarrete							11	Ret	11	Ret			16	11	14	Ret	0
28	(Spain) Balba González-Camino	16	Ret	Ret	14	14	Ret	14	11	17	16	18	Ret	Ret	17	Ret	14	0
29	(Spain) Ramón Caus	14	11	19	15													0
30	(Argentina) Federico Sanz	Ret	12	14	Ret													0
31	(Hungary) Tamás Illés	Ret	17			15	Ret	18	Ret	18	17			14	15	17	13	0
32	(Spain) Lluís Llobet	Ret	Ret	20	Ret	16	Ret	15	Ret					15	Ret	Ret	15	0
33	(United Kingdom) Greg Caton											15	Ret					0
34	(Spain) Abimael Tomeno													17	Ret	Ret	Ret	0
35	(Spain) Víctor Fernández	17	19															0
36	(Sweden) Frederic Haglund															Ret	DNS	0
Pos	Driver	ALB (Spain)		JER (Spain)		JAR (Spain)		MNZ (Italy)		JAR (Spain)		DON (United Kingdom)		BAR (Spain)		VAL (Spain)		Pts

=== Teams ===
- Points System:

Pos	1	2	3	4	5	6	7	8	9	10	FL
Pts	20	15	12	10	8	6	4	3	2	1	2

Pos	Escudería	ALB (Spain)		JER (Spain)		JAR (Spain)		MNZ (Italy)		JAR (Spain)		DON (United Kingdom)		BAR (Spain)		VAL (Spain)		Pts
1	(Spain) Campos Motorsport	2	1	5	8	4	1	5	Ret	2	1	1	1	7	1	2	1	230
2	(Italy) Scuderia Famà	3	2	1	3	5	EX	3	12	8	8	2	6	1	2	3	4	169
3	(Italy) Venturini Racing	9	16	2	2	2	5	4	2	4	3	11	3	8	6	7	6	137
4	(Italy) Auto in Motorsport	4	4	8	6	8	2	6	1	6	5	3	4	4	12	6	7	129
5	(France) Ericsson G-Tec	13	5	11	Ret	6	13	2	8	1	2	7	5	2	5	4	8	119
6	(Italy) Nokia - EC Motorsport	1	Ret	3	1	Ret	9	1	Ret	5	13	9	Ret	Ret	3	5	3	118
7	(Spain) Movistar Racing Fórmula	5	3	7	14	3	Ret	14	11	7	7	12	Ret	5	4	13	10	63
8	(France) G-Tec	6	9	4	4	1	4											62
9	(Italy) Vergani Racing															1	2	35
10	(Spain) Glückmann Racing	8	Ret	6	7	Ret	6	Ret	DNS			4	Ret	10	9	Ret	Ret	32
11	(Spain) Saturn Motorsport	17	13	17	12	11	8	7	5					15	Ret	Ret	15	15
12	(Italy) Sol-EC Motorsport	15	8	16	13	13	12	9	6	12	14	16	11	11	8	11	12	14
13	(Spain) Promodrive Racing	11	Ret	Ret	DNS	10	10	13	7	10	11	10	9	9	13	16	Ret	12
14	(Italy) Tecno Dinamica Attiva							Ret	10	15	12	8	8					7
15	(France) McDonald's G-Tec							11	Ret	11	Ret			16	11	14	Ret	0
16	(Spain) M-Tac	14	11	19	15													0
17	(Spain) Bigi Motorsport	Ret	12	14	Ret													0
18	(Liechtenstein) Formax Racing Team	Ret	17			15	Ret	18	Ret	18	17			14	15	17	13	0
19	(France) Ocean G-Tec											15	Ret					0
NC	(Spain) Azteca Motorsport															Ret	DNS	0
Pos	Escudería	ALB (Spain)		JER (Spain)		JAR (Spain)		MON (Italy)		JAR (Spain)		DON (United Kingdom)		BAR (Spain)		VAL (Spain)		Pts
