= 2000 Open Telefonica by Nissan =

2000 Open Telefónica by Nissan

Seasons
- ← 1999 2001 →

The 2000 Open Telefónica by Nissan was contested over 8 race weekends/16 rounds. In this one-make formula all drivers had to use Coloni CN1 chassis and Nissan engines. 14 different teams and 28 different drivers competed.

== Teams and Drivers ==
Teams	No.	Drivers	Rounds
(Spain) Campos Motorsport	1	(Spain) Antonio García	All
(Spain) Campos Motorsport	2	(France) Patrice Gay	All
(Italy) Scuderia Famà	3	(Argentina) Diego Iencinella	1-2
(Italy) Scuderia Famà	4	(Switzerland) Joël Camathias	All
(Italy) Scuderia Famà	16	(Portugal) Paulo Alho	4, 6-7
(Italy) Venturini Racing	5	(Portugal) Rui Aguas	All
(Italy) Venturini Racing	6	(Italy) Matteo Bobbi	All
(France) Ericsson Challenge by G-Tec	7	(France) Laurent Delahaye	All
(France) Ericsson Challenge by G-Tec	8	(Spain) Rafael Sarandeses	All
(Italy) Ergoline EC Motorsport	9	(Spain) Ángel Burgueño	All
(Italy) Ergoline EC Motorsport	10	(Italy) Giovanni Anapoli	4
(Spain) Glückmann Racing	11	(Spain) Jordi Nogués	1–5, 7-8
(Italy) Doors Engineering	14	(Italy) Andrea Belicchi	All
(Italy) Doors Engineering	15	(Italy) Riccardo Ronchi	1
(Italy) Doors Engineering	23	(Spain) Fernando Navarrete	3-4
(Italy) Doors Engineering	30	(Italy) Francesca Pardini	7-8
(Liechtenstein) Formax Racing	17	(Hungary) Tamás Illés	1-3
(Spain) Repsol Meycom	18	(Spain) Víctor Ordóñez	All
(Italy) Doors Junior Team	19	(Italy) Alessandro Gavazzoni	All
(Italy) Doors Junior Team	20	(France) Guillaume Greuet	1-2
(France) Epsilon by Graff	21	(France) Gregoire de Galzain	All
(France) Epsilon by Graff	22	(France) Jean-Christophe Ravier	All
(France) Epsilon by Graff	26	(France) Jérôme Dalla Lana	4-5
(Spain) Elide Racing	24	(Spain) Santiago Porteiro	1–4, 6, 8
(Spain) Vergani Racing España	27	(Italy) Giuseppe Burlotti	All
(Spain) Vergani Racing España	118	(Chile) Cristián Mackenna	All
(Spain) Promodrive Racing	28	(Argentina) Ezequiel Toia	1
(Liechtenstein) TCR Formax Racing	29	(France) Philippe Benoliel	4

== Race calendar ==
Round		Circuit	Date	Pole position	Fastest lap	Winning driver	Winning team	Report
1	R1	Circuito Ricardo Tormo, Valencia, Spain	March 25	(Italy) Giuseppe Burlotti	(Spain) Antonio García	(Italy) Giuseppe Burlotti	(Spain) Vergani Racing España	Report
1	R2	Circuito Ricardo Tormo, Valencia, Spain	March 26	(Spain) Antonio García	(Spain) Antonio García	(Spain) Antonio García	(Spain) Campos Motorsport	Report
2	R1	Circuit de Catalunya, Barcelona, Spain	April 15	(Italy) Giuseppe Burlotti	(Portugal) Rui Aguas	(Italy) Giuseppe Burlotti	(Spain) Vergani Racing España	Report
2	R2	Circuit de Catalunya, Barcelona, Spain	April 16	(Spain) Antonio García	(Portugal) Rui Aguas	(Italy) Giuseppe Burlotti	(Spain) Vergani Racing España	Report
3	R1	Circuito del Jarama, San Sebastián de los Reyes, Spain	May 20	(Spain) Antonio García	(Spain) Antonio García	(Spain) Antonio García	(Spain) Campos Motorsport	Report
3	R2	Circuito del Jarama, San Sebastián de los Reyes, Spain	May 21	(Spain) Antonio García	(France) Patrice Gay	(France) Patrice Gay	(Spain) Campos Motorsport	Report
4	R1	Circuito de Albacete, Albacete, Spain	June 17	(Italy) Andrea Belicchi	(Spain) Antonio García	(Italy) Andrea Belicchi	(Italy) Doors Engineering	Report
4	R2	Circuito de Albacete, Albacete, Spain	June 18	(Italy) Giuseppe Burlotti	(Spain) Antonio García	(Italy) Giuseppe Burlotti	(Spain) Vergani Racing España	Report
5	R1	Circuit de Nevers Magny-Cours, Nevers, France	July 15	(France) Jean-Christophe Ravier	(Portugal) Rui Aguas	(Portugal) Rui Aguas	(Italy) Venturini Racing	Report
5	R2	Circuit de Nevers Magny-Cours, Nevers, France	July 16	(Spain) Antonio García	(France) Patrice Gay	(Spain) Antonio García	(Spain) Campos Motorsport	Report
6	R1	(United Kingdom) Donington Park, Castle Donington, UK	August 5	(Spain) Ángel Burgueño	(Spain) Ángel Burgueño	(Spain) Ángel Burgueño	(Italy) EC Motorsport	Report
6	R2	(United Kingdom) Donington Park, Castle Donington, UK	August 6	(Spain) Ángel Burgueño	(Spain) Ángel Burgueño	(Spain) Ángel Burgueño	(Italy) EC Motorsport	Report
7	R1	Autodromo Nazionale Monza, Monza, Italy	September 30	(Italy) Andrea Belicchi	(Italy) Andrea Belicchi	(Italy) Andrea Belicchi	(Italy) Doors Engineering	Report
7	R2	Autodromo Nazionale Monza, Monza, Italy	October 1	(Italy) Andrea Belicchi	(Portugal) Rui Aguas	(France) Patrice Gay	(Spain) Campos Motorsport	Report
8	R1	Circuito Ricardo Tormo, Valencia, Spain	November 4	(Italy) Giuseppe Burlotti	(Italy) Giuseppe Burlotti	(Italy) Giuseppe Burlotti	(Spain) Vergani Racing España	Report
8	R2	Circuito Ricardo Tormo, Valencia, Spain	November 5	(Italy) Giuseppe Burlotti	(Spain) Antonio García	(Spain) Antonio García	(Spain) Campos Motorsport	Report

== Final points standings ==
=== Drivers ===
For every race the points were awarded: 20 points to the winner, 15 for runner-up, 12 for third place, 10 for fourth place, 8 for fifth place, 6 for sixth place, 4 for seventh place, winding down to 1 point for 10th place. Lower placed drivers did not award points. Additional points were awarded to the driver setting the fastest race lap (2 points). The best 12 race results count, but all additional points count. Three drivers had a point deduction, which are given in ().

- Points System:

Pos	1	2	3	4	5	6	7	8	9	10	FL
Pts	20	15	12	10	8	6	4	3	2	1	2

Pos	Driver	VAL (Spain)		CAT (Spain)		JAR (Spain)		ALB (Spain)		MAG (France)		DON (United Kingdom)		MNZ (Italy)		VAL (Spain)		Pts
1	(Spain) Antonio García	2	1	6	2	1	4	10	4	4	1	2	2	9	3	2	1	199
2	(Italy) Giuseppe Burlotti	1	4	1	1	5	9	2	1	7	4	4	10	4	4	1	2	182
3	(Portugal) Rui Aguas	3	6	2	3	2	12	9	2	1	Ret	5	5	3	2	4	3	160
4	(Spain) Ángel Burgueño	4	3	Ret	6	Ret	2	4	Ret	5	Ret	1	1	6	6	9	5	127
5	(France) Patrice Gay	9	2	4	5	Ret	1	8	Ret	3	2	12	6	Ret	1	8	6	124
6	(France) Jean-Christophe Ravier	7	8	9	DNS	Ret	3	5	3	2	6	7	4	2	Ret	DNS	4	101
7	(Italy) Andrea Belicchi	Ret	Ret	10	10	10	5	1	Ret	8	3	3	11	1	5	Ret	Ret	90
8	(France) Laurent Delahaye	6	15	Ret	4	9	Ret	3	Ret	10	Ret	6	3	8	Ret	3	Ret	64
9	(Switzerland) Joël Camathias	8	Ret	5	7	3	6	6	8	14	10	9	9	12	8	7	10	54
10	(Spain) Rafael Sarandeses	5	5	Ret	15	13	8	Ret	Ret	17	5	11	7	Ret	7	14	Ret	35
11	(Italy) Matteo Bobbi	Ret	7	Ret	Ret	6	10	16	9	16	7	8	8	10	9	5	11	34
12	(Spain) Jordi Nogués	15	16	3	14	Ret	7	Ret	7	13	8			Ret	Ret	10	7	28
13	(Spain) Victor Ordóñez	16	12	12	16	4	Ret	12	14†	12	9	10	13	13	10	6	8	23
14	(Chile) Cristián Mackenna	Ret	Ret	7	9	Ret	DNS	Ret	6	15	Ret	Ret	Ret	5	Ret	12	9	22
15	(France) Jérôme Dalla Lana							Ret	5	6	13†							14
16	(France) Grégoire de Galzain	11	13	13	17	7	Ret	13	Ret	9	12	14	14	7	Ret	11	12	10
17	(France) Guillaume Greuet	Ret	10	8	8													7
18	(Spain) Santiago Porteiro	10	11	14	12	EX	EX	7	10			13	12			Ret	Ret	6
19	(Italy) Alessandro Gavazzoni	12	14	11	11	8	Ret	Ret	Ret	11	11	Ret	Ret	14	DNS	13	13	3
20	(Hungary) Tamás Illés	14	9	16	Ret	12	Ret											2
21	(Portugal) Paulo Alho							14	11			Ret	15	11	Ret			0
22	(Spain) Fernando Navarrete					11	11	Ret	Ret									0
23	(Italy) Giovanni Anapoli							11	13†									0
24	(Italy) Francesca Pardini													Ret	11†	15	Ret	0
25	(France) Philippe Benoliel							15	12									0
26	(Argentina) Diego Iencinella	17	Ret	15	13													0
27	(Italy) Riccardo Ronchi	13	Ret															0
	(Argentina) Ezequiel Toia	DNS	DNS															
Pos	Driver	VAL (Spain)		BAR (Spain)		JAR (Spain)		ALB (Spain)		MAG (France)		DON (United Kingdom)		MNZ (Italy)		VAL (Spain)		Pts

=== Teams ===
- Points System:

Pos	1	2	3	4	5	6	7	8	9	10	FL
Pts	20	15	12	10	8	6	4	3	2	1	2

Pos	Team	VAL (Spain)		BAR (Spain)		JAR (Spain)		ALB (Spain)		MAG (France)		DON (United Kingdom)		MNZ (Italy)		VAL (Spain)		Pts
1	(Spain) Campos Motorsport	2	1	4	2	1	1	8	4	3	1	2	2	9	1	2	1	248
2	(Spain) Vergani Racing España	1	4	1	1	5	9	2	1	7	4	4	10	4	4	1	2	197
3	(Italy) Venturini Racing	3	6	2	3	2	10	9	2	1	7	5	5	3	2	4	3	173
4	(Italy) Ergoline EC Motorsport	4	3	Ret	6	Ret	2	4	13†	5	Ret	1	1	6	6	9	5	127
5	(France) Epsilon by Graff	7	8	9	17	7	3	5	3	2	6	7	4	2	Ret	11	4	105
6	(Italy) Doors Engineering	13	Ret	10	10	10	5	1	Ret	8	3	3	11	1	5	15	Ret	90
7	(France) Ericsson C. by G-Tec	5	5	Ret	4	9	8	3	Ret	10	5	6	3	8	7	3	Ret	89
8	(Italy) Scuderia Famà	8	Ret	5	7	3	6	6	8	14	10	9	9	11	8	7	10	55
9	(Spain) Glückmann Racing	15	16	3	14	Ret	7	Ret	7	13	8			Ret	Ret	10	7	28
10	(Spain) Repsol Meycom	16	12	12	16	4	Ret	12	14†	12	9	10	13	13	10	6	8	23
11	(Italy) Doors Junior Team	12	10	8	8	8	Ret	Ret	Ret	11	11	Ret	Ret	14	DNS	13	13	10
12	(Spain) Elide Racing	10	11	14	12	EX	EX	7	10			13	12			Ret	Ret	6
13	(Liechtenstein) Formax Racing	14	9	16	Ret	12	Ret											2
14	(Liechtenstein) TCR Formax Racing							15	12									0
NC	(Spain) Promodrive Racing	DNS	DNS															0
Pos	Team	VAL (Spain)		BAR (Spain)		JAR (Spain)		ALB (Spain)		MAG (France)		DON (United Kingdom)		MNZ (Italy)		VAL (Spain)		Pts
