= Coloni CN1 =

Italian open-wheel race car

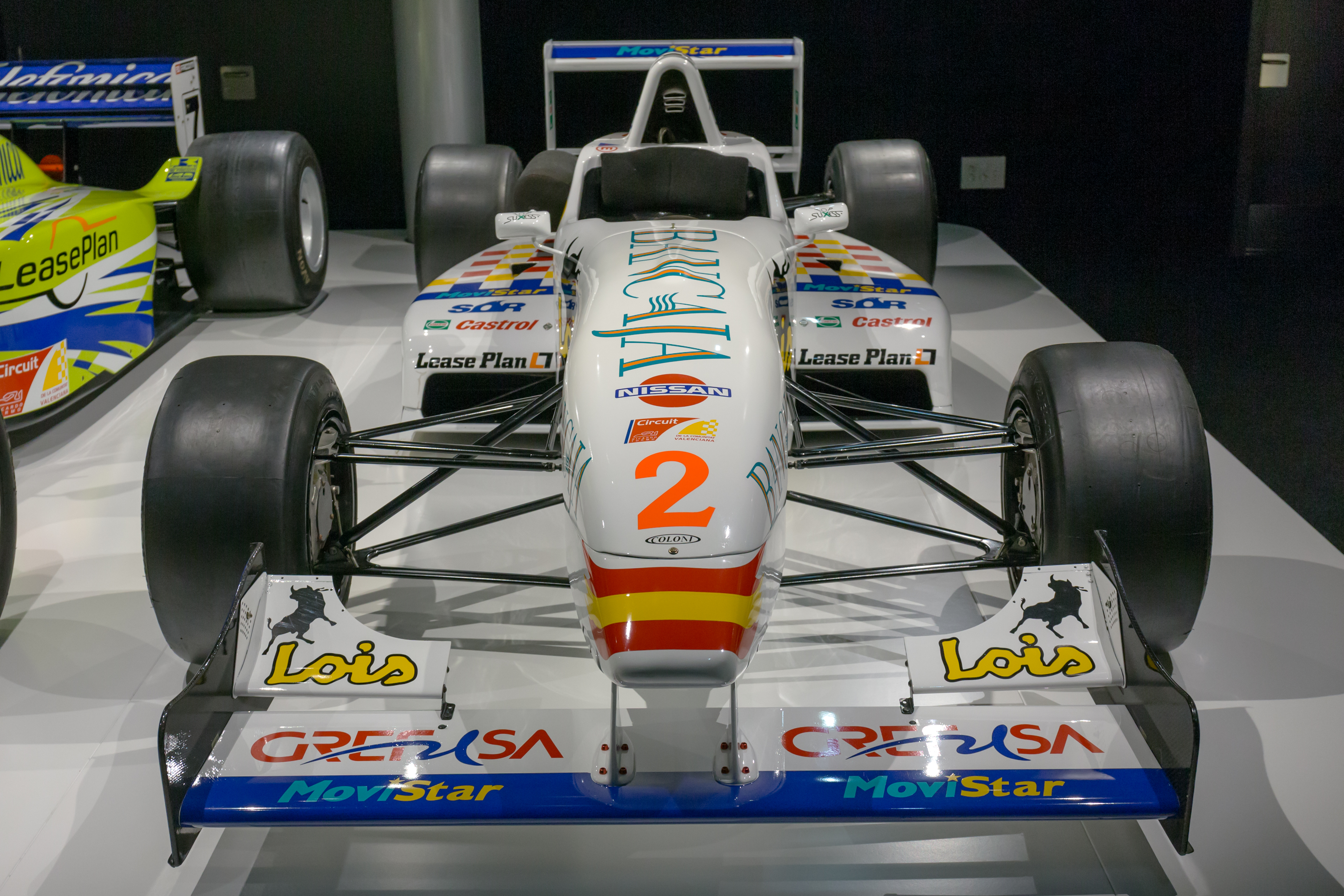
- Category: World Series by Nissan
- Constructor: Coloni
- Designer(s): Enrique Scalabroni
- Successor: Dallara SN01

Technical specifications
- Chassis: Carbon fiber monocoque
- Axle track: Front: 1,770 mm (70 in); Rear: 1,750 mm (69 in)
- Wheelbase: 2,675 mm (105.3 in)
- Engine: Mid-engine, longitudinally-mounted, 2.0 L (122.0 cu in), Nissan SR20, I4, DOHC, NA
- Transmission: 5-speed H-pattern manual or sequential manual + reverse
- Power: 250–280 hp (186–209 kW) @ 8000 rpm 237 N⋅m (175 lb⋅ft) @ 6750 rpm
- Weight: 455 kg (1,003 lb)
- Tires: Michelin Speedline; 10" Front, 12" Rear

Competition history
- Debut: 1998 Albacete Euro Open by Nissan round
- Last event: 2001 Ricardo Tormo 2nd Open Telefónica by Nissan round
| Races | Wins | Poles | F/Laps |
|---|---|---|---|
| 62 | 62 | 62 | 62 |
- Constructors' Championships: Campos Motorsport (1998, 1999, 2000); Graffin Epsilon (2001)
- Drivers' Championships: Marc Gené (1998); Fernando Alonso (1999); Antonio García (2000); Franck Montagny (2001)

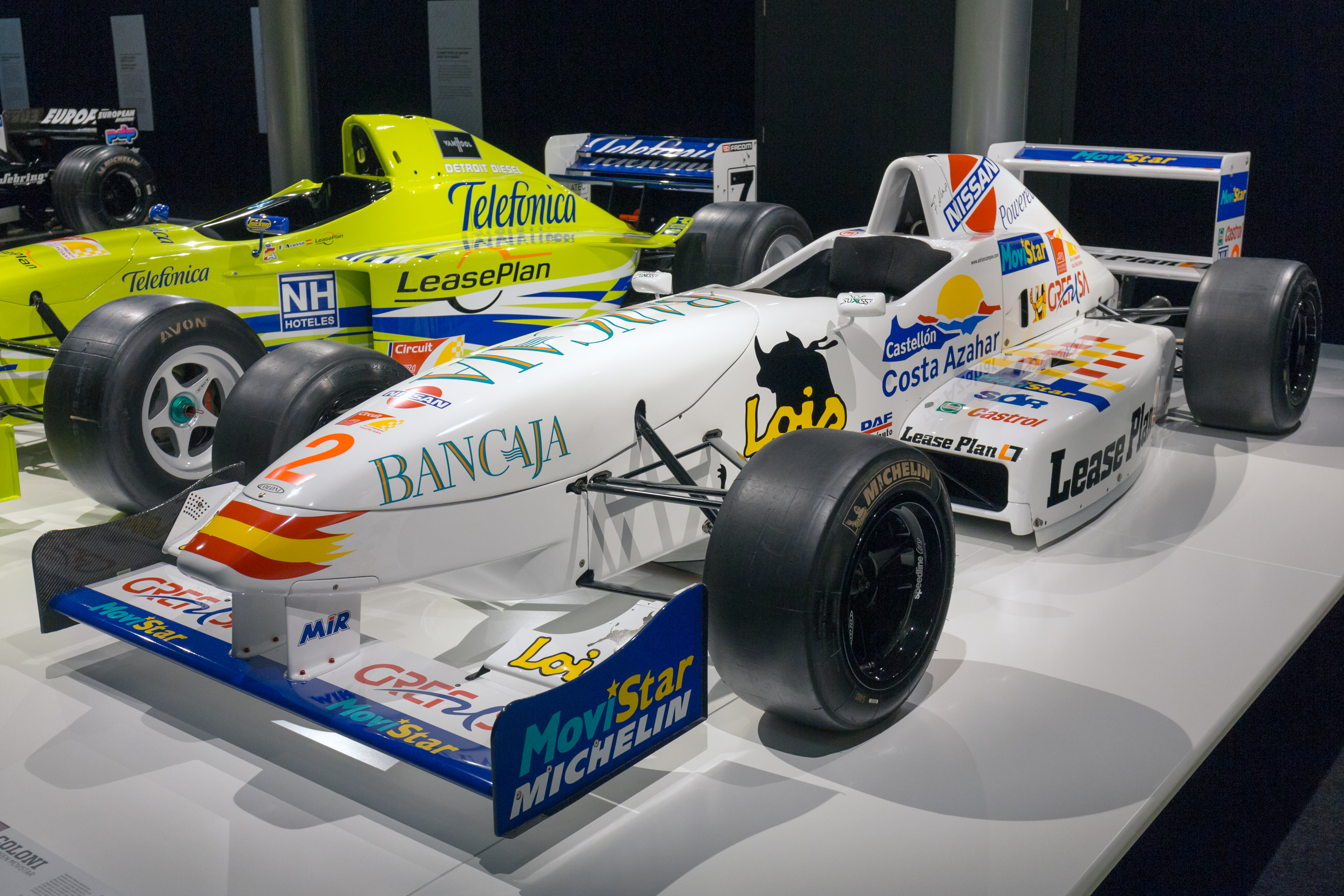
Coloni CN1/98 of Fernando Alonso

The Coloni CN1 is an open-wheel formula racing car, designed, developed, and built Italian manufacturer, team, and constructor, Scuderia Coloni, for the one-make World Series by Nissan spec-series, between 1998 and 2001. It was powered by a naturally-aspirated 2.0 L (120 cu in) Nissan SR20 four-cylinder engine, producing between 250–280 hp (190–210 kW).
