= Campos Racing =

Spanish motor racing team

(Spain) Campos Racing (Note: In 2016 the team entered the GP2 Series as Pertamina Campos Racing under an Indonesian licence.)
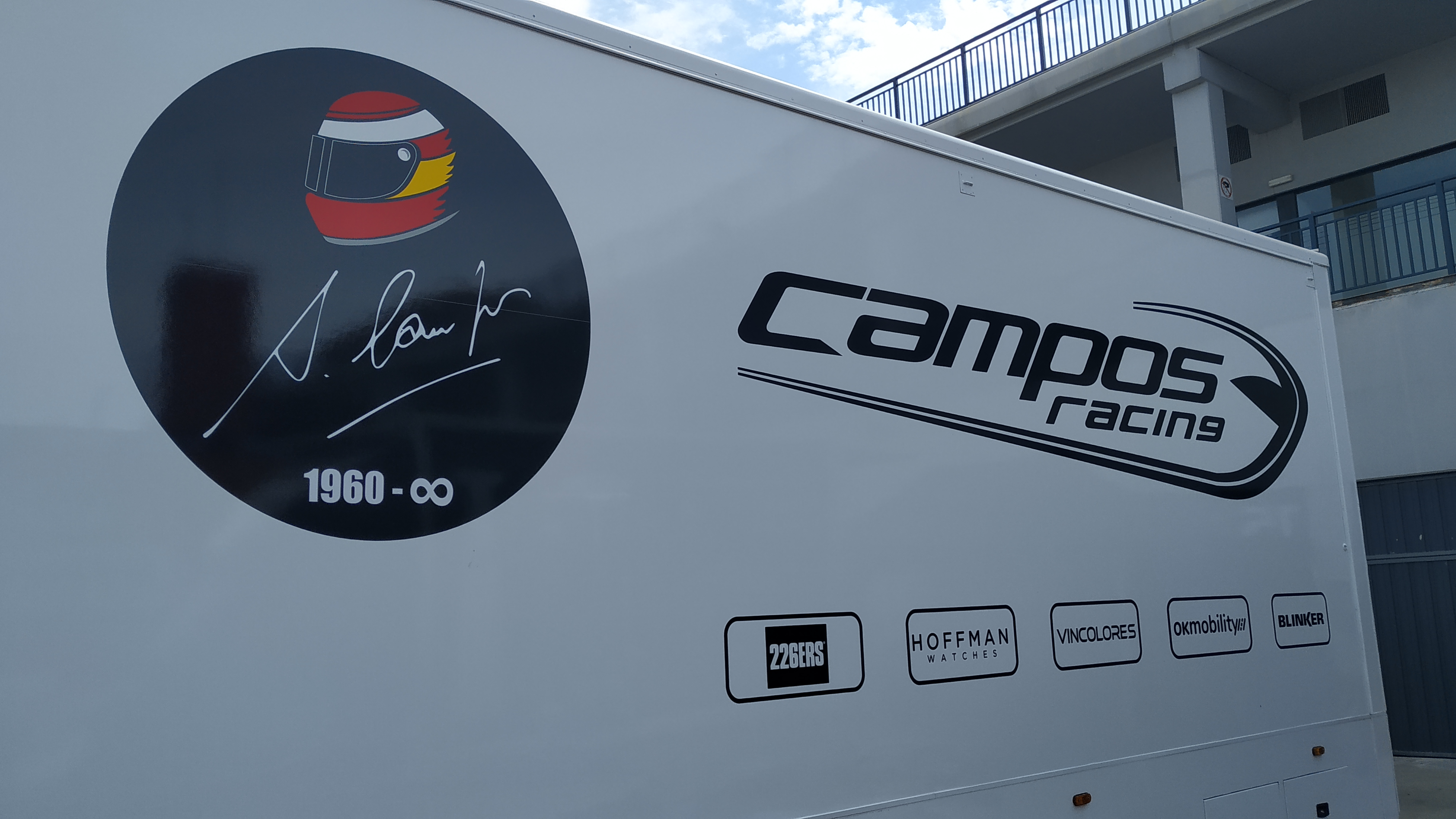
- Founded: 1997
- Founder(s): Adrián Campos Sr.
- Base: Alzira, Valencia, Spain
- Team principal(s): Adrián Campos Jr.
- Current series: FIA Formula 2 Championship; FIA Formula 3 Championship; F4 Spanish Championship; F1 Academy; Eurocup-3; Le Mans Cup
- Former series: Auto GP; World Series by Nissan; GP2 Series; GP3 Series; World Touring Car Championship; World Touring Car Cup; Superstars Series; Euroformula Open Championship; European Touring Car Cup; FIA Formula E Championship (Note: Operation team for NEXTEV TCR team (2014–15 season) and Mahindra Racing (2016–17 season))
- Current drivers: Formula 2: 5. (Mexico) Noel León; 6. (Bulgaria) Nikola Tsolov; Formula 3: 1. (France) Théophile Naël; 2. (United States) Ugo Ugochukwu; 3. (Australia) Patrick Heuzenroeder; 3. (Mexico) Ernesto Rivera; Spanish Formula 4: 8. (Malta) Jacob Micallef; 10. (Spain) Luna Fluxá; 22. (United States) Vivek Kanthan; 37. (Canada) Ty Fisher; 38. (Republic of Ireland) Daniel Kelleher; 81. (Portugal) Noah Monteiro; F1 Academy: 4. (United Kingdom) Megan Bruce; 18. (Brazil) Rafaela Ferreira; 21. (United Kingdom) Alisha Palmowski
- Teams' Championships: Euro Open by Nissan: 1998, 2000; GP2 Series: 2008; Spanish Formula 3: 2008, 2015, 2016; European F3 Open: 2009; Euroformula Open Championship: 2016; F4 Spanish Championship: 2022, 2023; Eurocup-3: 2023; FIA Formula 3 Championship; 2025, 2026; F1 Academy: 2026
- Drivers' Championships: Euro Open by Nissan: 1998: Marc Gené; 1999: Fernando Alonso; 2000: Antonio García; Spanish Formula 3: 2008: Germán Sánchez; European F3 Open: 2009: Bruno Méndez; Formula E: 2014–15: Nelson Piquet Jr.; Spanish Formula Three: 2015: Konstantin Tereshchenko; 2016: Leonardo Pulcini; Euroformula Open Championship: 2016: Leonardo Pulcini; F4 Spanish Championship: 2022: Nikola Tsolov; Eurocup-3: 2023: Esteban Masson; FIA Formula 3 Championship: 2026: Ugo Ugochukwu; F1 Academy: 2026: Alisha Palmowski
- Website: Campos Racing

Campos Racing (formerly Adrián Campos Motorsport and Campos Grand Prix) is a Spanish motor racing team based in Alzira, Valencia, founded by former Formula One driver Adrián Campos in 1997. The team has been successful in Formula Three, GP2 Series and F4 Spanish Championship.

Previous drivers include Fernando Alonso, Marc Gené, Antonio García, Roldán Rodríguez, Vitaly Petrov, Lucas Di Grassi, Sergio Pérez, Alexander Rossi, Álex Palou, Rio Haryanto, Mitch Evans, Roberto Merhi, Lando Norris, Luca Ghiotto, Roy Nissany, Jack Aitken, Linus Lundqvist, Isack Hadjar, Pepe Martí and Arvid Lindblad.

== History ==
After retiring from racing, Campos formed his own team at the end of 1997, under the name Campos Motorsport. In 1998 the team began by competing in the new Open Fortuna by Nissan, with Marc Gené and Antonio García as drivers. Gené won the championship and García finished fifth, with Campos taking the teams title. Gené stepped up to Formula One in 1999, and his place in the team was taken by karting driver Fernando Alonso. Alonso went on to win the Euro Open Movistar by Nissan as it was renamed, with García finishing fifth again and Campos retaining the teams title. With Alonso moving onto International Formula 3000, García led the team in 2000, winning the championship and also helping Campos to win a third consecutive teams title. The series became the World Series by Nissan in 2002.

In 2004 the team switched its focus to the Spanish Formula Three Championship, running two teams with four drivers. In 2005, the team's name was changed to Campos Racing and they set up a team in the new GP2 Series, as well as running a team in Spanish Formula 3 as well as its Copa de España F300 class, which it won with Arturo Llobell in 2005 and Germán Sánchez in 2006.

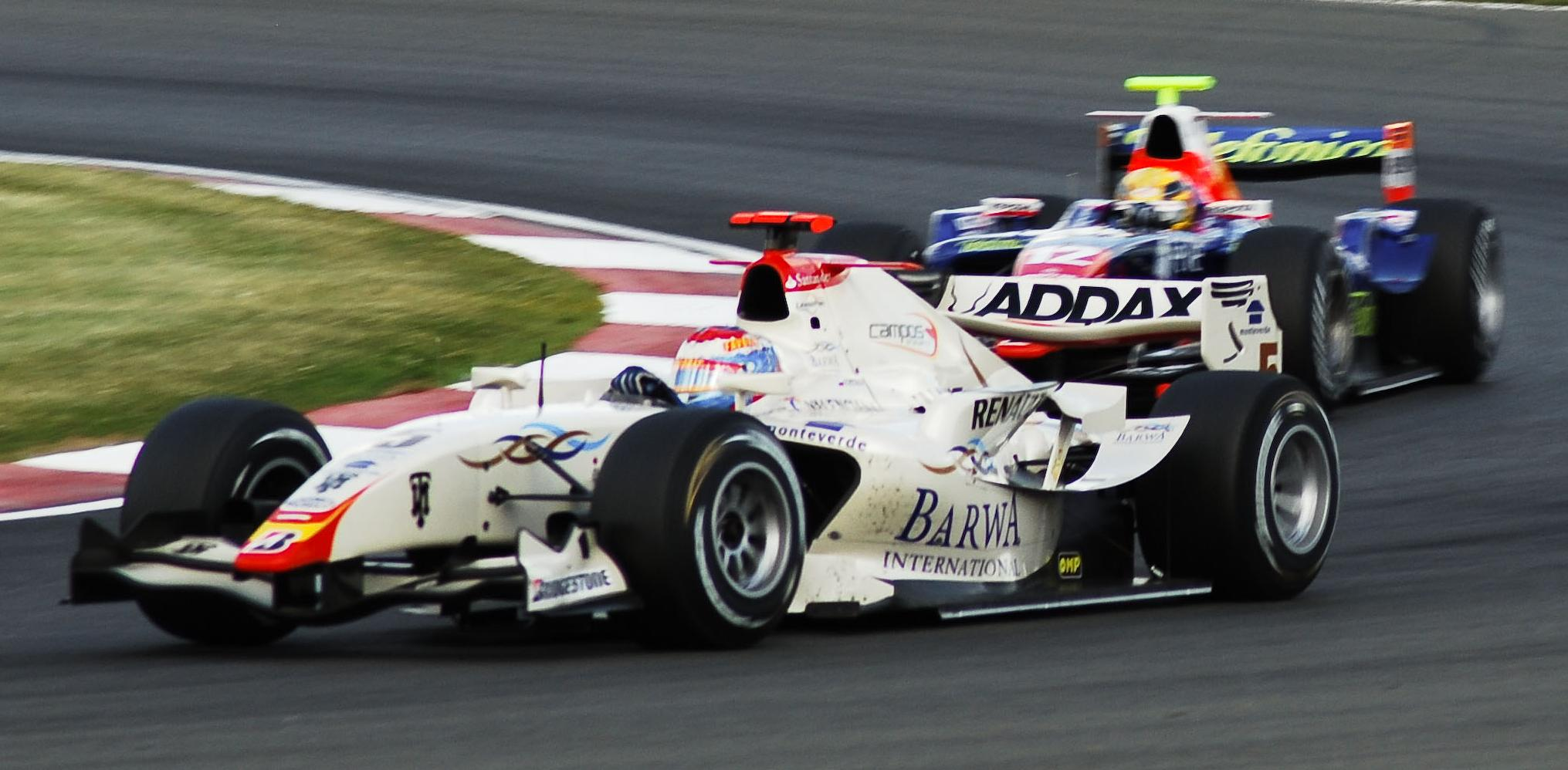
Vitaly Petrov driving for Campos Racing at the Silverstone round of the 2008 GP2 Series

Under the name of Campos Grand Prix, the team finished third in the GP2 drivers and teams championships, with Giorgio Pantano and Vitaly Petrov as drivers. In 2008, they won the teams championship and finished third in the drivers championship with Lucas di Grassi. They won their first overall Spanish F3 crown in 2008 with Germán Sánchez, and retained that title (now known as the European F3 Open) in 2009 with Bruno Méndez.

After the 2008 season, Campos passed control of his GP2 team to Spanish businessman Alejandro Agag, who renamed it Addax Team. In 2009, Campos was awarded a Formula One entry for his team to race in the 2010 season, originally under the Campos Grand Prix name, but the name was soon changed to Campos Meta. After financial struggles, the team was bought out in February 2010 by majority shareholder José Ramón Carabante, who renamed it Hispania Racing.

Campos returned to GP2 in 2014 replacing the Addax Team on the grid, with drivers Arthur Pic and Kimiya Sato. Alexander Rossi replaced Sato at the Hockenheimring due to Sato competing in an Auto GP race.

Pic was retained for the 2015 GP2 season, with Rio Haryanto joining the team. In addition, Campos entered the GP3 Series in place of Hilmer Motorsport, with Álex Palou claiming a win.

In 2016, Mitch Evans and Sean Gelael joined the GP2 squad. In GP3, Palou was joined by Steijn Schothorst and Konstantin Tereshchenko.

In the 2017 FIA Formula 2 Championship, Ralph Boschung drove the #11 car except for the last round, whereas Robert Vișoiu entered most rounds with the #12. The GP3 drivers were Raoul Hyman, Julien Falchero and Marcos Siebert.

In 2018, Luca Ghiotto switched to the team in F2 from Russian Time. He was partnered by Roy Nissany, then Roberto Merhi. In the GP3 Series the team was presented by Simo Laaksonen, while Diego Menchaca and Leonardo Pulcini restored their partnership with Campos, after they were previously teammates in the 2016 Euroformula Open Championship.

In 2019, the team joined the grid for the FIA Formula 3 Championship, signing Sebastián Fernández, Alessio Deledda, and Alex Peroni. For their Formula 2 campaign, the team signed Dorian Boccolacci and Jack Aitken.

In the 2020 FIA Formula 2 Championship the team retained Aitken and signed Guilherme Samaia. In Campos' 2020 FIA Formula 3 Championship campaign they retained Peroni and Deledda and signed Sophia Flörsch.

Team founder Adrián Campos died on 28 January 2021. He was replaced by his eponymous son as team principal.

== Current series results ==
=== FIA Formula 2 Championship ===
Year	Chassis	Engine	Tyres	Drivers	Races	Wins	Poles	F. Laps	Podiums	D.C.	Pts	T.C.	Pts
2017	Dallara; GP2/11	Mecachrome; V8108 V8	P	(Switzerland) Ralph Boschung	20	0	0	1	0	19th	11	9th	17
2017	Dallara; GP2/11	Mecachrome; V8108 V8	P	(United Kingdom) Lando Norris	2	0	0	0	0	25th	0	9th	17
2017	Dallara; GP2/11	Mecachrome; V8108 V8	P	(Monaco) Stefano Coletti	2	0	0	1	0	27th	0	9th	17
2017	Dallara; GP2/11	Mecachrome; V8108 V8	P	(Spain) Roberto Merhi	2	0	0	0	0	18th	0 (Note: 16 points scored for other teams.)	9th	17
2017	Dallara; GP2/11	Mecachrome; V8108 V8	P	(Romania) Robert Vișoiu	14	0	0	0	0	24th	1	9th	17
2017	Dallara; GP2/11	Mecachrome; V8108 V8	P	(Japan) Álex Palou (Note: Palou is a Spanish driver who competed under a Japanese racing license in 2017.)	4	0	0	0	0	21st	5	9th	17
2018	Dallara; F2 2018	Mecachrome; V634T V6 t	P	(Italy) Luca Ghiotto	24	0	0	1	4	8th	111	7th	132
2018	Dallara; F2 2018	Mecachrome; V634T V6 t	P	(Israel) Roy Nissany	20	0	0	0	0	22nd	1	7th	132
2018	Dallara; F2 2018	Mecachrome; V634T V6 t	P	(Spain) Roberto Merhi	4	0	0	0	1	12th	20 (Note: 41 points scored for other teams.)	7th	132
2019	Dallara; F2 2018	Mecachrome; V634T V6 t	P	(France) Dorian Boccolacci	10	0	0	0	0	14th	30	5th	189
2019	Dallara; F2 2018	Mecachrome; V634T V6 t	P	(India) Arjun Maini	6	0	0	0	0	24th	0	5th	189
2019	Dallara; F2 2018	Mecachrome; V634T V6 t	P	(Japan) Marino Sato	6	0	0	0	0	21st	0	5th	189
2019	Dallara; F2 2018	Mecachrome; V634T V6 t	P	(United Kingdom) Jack Aitken	22	3	0	1	7	5th	159	5th	189
2020	Dallara; F2 2018	Mecachrome; V634T V6 t	P	(United Kingdom) Jack Aitken	22	0	0	1	2	14th	48	9th	48
2020	Dallara; F2 2018	Mecachrome; V634T V6 t	P	(Switzerland) Ralph Boschung	2	0	0	0	0	25th	0	9th	48
2020	Dallara; F2 2018	Mecachrome; V634T V6 t	P	(Brazil) Guilherme Samaia	24	0	0	0	0	24th	0	9th	48
2021	Dallara; F2 2018	Mecachrome; V634T V6 t	P	(Brazil) Gianluca Petecof	6	0	0	0	0	27th	0	7th	66.5
2021	Dallara; F2 2018	Mecachrome; V634T V6 t	P	(Italy) Matteo Nannini	5	0	0	0	0	22nd	0 (Note: 1 point scored for other teams.)	7th	66.5
2021	Dallara; F2 2018	Mecachrome; V634T V6 t	P	(Germany) David Beckmann	5	0	0	0	0	15th	7 (Note: 25 points scored for other teams.)	7th	66.5
2021	Dallara; F2 2018	Mecachrome; V634T V6 t	P	(United Kingdom) Olli Caldwell	6	0	0	1	0	26th	0	7th	66.5
2021	Dallara; F2 2018	Mecachrome; V634T V6 t	P	(Switzerland) Ralph Boschung	23	0	0	1	2	10th	59.5	7th	66.5
2022	Dallara; F2 2018	Mecachrome; V634T V6 t	P	(United Kingdom) Olli Caldwell	26	0	0	0	0	21st	12	11th	67
2022	Dallara; F2 2018	Mecachrome; V634T V6 t	P	(Germany) Lirim Zendeli	2	0	0	0	0	27th	0	11th	67
2022	Dallara; F2 2018	Mecachrome; V634T V6 t	P	(Switzerland) Ralph Boschung	16	0	0	0	2	15th	40	11th	67
2022	Dallara; F2 2018	Mecachrome; V634T V6 t	P	(Spain) Roberto Merhi	6	0	0	0	1	20th	15	11th	67
2023	Dallara; F2 2018	Mecachrome; V634T V6 t	P	(India) Kush Maini	26	0	0	0	1	11th	62	9th	99
2023	Dallara; F2 2018	Mecachrome; V634T V6 t	P	(Switzerland) Ralph Boschung	26	1	0	0	2	16th	37	9th	99
2024	Dallara; F2 2024	Mecachrome; V634T V6 t	P	(France) Isack Hadjar	28	4	1	1	8	2nd	192	2nd	254
2024	Dallara; F2 2024	Mecachrome; V634T V6 t	P	(Spain) Pepe Martí	28	1	0	0	4	14th	62	2nd	254
2025	Dallara; F2 2024	Mecachrome; V634T V6 t	P	(Spain) Pepe Martí	23	3	0	0	5	8th	112	3rd	258
2025	Dallara; F2 2024	Mecachrome; V634T V6 t	P	(Bulgaria) Nikola Tsolov	4	0	0	0	1	18th	12	3rd	258
2025	Dallara; F2 2024	Mecachrome; V634T V6 t	P	(United Kingdom) Arvid Lindblad	27	3	1	2	5	6th	134	3rd	258
2026	Dallara; F2 2024	Mecachrome; V634T V6 t	P	(Mexico) Noel León	25	3	1	2	5	6th	133	1st	333*
2026	Dallara; F2 2024	Mecachrome; V634T V6 t	P	(Bulgaria) Nikola Tsolov	25	6	0	2	9	2nd	200	1st	333*

* Season still in progress.

==== In detail ====
(key)

Year	Drivers	1	2	3	4	5	6	7	8	9	10	11	12	13	14	15	16	17	18	19	20	21	22	23	24	25	26	27	28	29	T.C.	Points
2017		BHR; FEA	BHR; SPR	CAT; FEA	CAT; SPR	MCO; FEA	MCO; SPR	BAK; FEA	BAK; SPR	RBR; FEA	RBR; SPR	SIL; FEA	SIL; SPR	HUN; FEA	HUN; SPR	SPA; FEA	SPA; SPR	MNZ; FEA	MNZ; SPR	JER; FEA	JER; SPR	YAS; FEA	YAS; SPR								9th	17
2017	(Switzerland) Ralph Boschung	12	Ret	12	17^{F}	12	Ret	8	8	7	Ret	11	Ret	11	16	13	13	15	13	Ret	19†										9th	17
2017	(United Kingdom) Lando Norris																					Ret	13								9th	17
2017	(Monaco) Stefano Coletti	16^{F}	15																												9th	17
2017	(Spain) Roberto Merhi			19†	12																										9th	17
2017	(Romania) Robert Vișoiu					Ret	15	15	11	11	17†	17	11	Ret	Ret	10	16	16	19												9th	17
2017	(Japan) Álex Palou																			8	8	12	12								9th	17
2018		BHR; FEA	BHR; SPR	BAK; FEA	BAK; SPR	CAT; FEA	CAT; SPR	MCO; FEA	MCO; SPR	LEC; FEA	LEC; SPR	RBR; FEA	RBR; SPR	SIL; FEA	SIL; SPR	HUN; FEA	HUN; SPR	SPA; FEA	SPA; SPR	MNZ; FEA	MNZ; SPR	SOC; FEA	SOC; SPR	YAS; FEA	YAS; SPR						7th	132
2018	(Italy) Luca Ghiotto	12	6	Ret	14	4	5	Ret	10	3	3	12	13	5	10	6	2	7	6	10	6	Ret	14	3^{F}	9						7th	132
2018	(Israel) Roy Nissany	16	15	Ret	Ret	12	14	12	Ret	15	10	Ret	17	15	14	15	15	10	14	16	15										7th	132
2018	(Spain) Roberto Merhi																					9	6	8	3						7th	132
2019		BHR; FEA	BHR; SPR	BAK; FEA	BAK; SPR	CAT; FEA	CAT; SPR	MCO; FEA	MCO; SPR	LEC; FEA	LEC; SPR	RBR; FEA	RBR; SPR	SIL; FEA	SIL; SPR	HUN; FEA	HUN; SPR	SPA; FEA	SPA; SPR	MNZ; FEA	MNZ; SPR	SOC; FEA	SOC; SPR	YAS; FEA	YAS; SPR						5th	189
2019	(France) Dorian Boccolacci	15	17	5	7	14	18	4	5	Ret	13																				5th	189
2019	(India) Arjun Maini											DSQ	15	13	13	Ret	16														5th	189
2019	(Japan) Marino Sato																	C	C	12	11	16	15	18	16						5th	189
2019	(United Kingdom) Jack Aitken	7	11	1	3	2	8	17†	13	3	4	10	18	5	1^{F}	3	5	C	C	8	1	7	11	11	10						5th	189
2020		RBR; FEA	RBR; SPR	RBR; FEA	RBR; SPR	HUN; FEA	HUN; SPR	SIL; FEA	SIL; SPR	SIL; FEA	SIL; SPR	CAT; FEA	CAT; SPR	SPA; FEA	SPA; SPR	MNZ; FEA	MNZ; SPR	MUG; FEA	MUG; SPR	SOC; FEA	SOC; SPR	BHR; FEA	BHR; SPR	BHR; FEA	BHR; SPR						9th	48
2020	(United Kingdom) Jack Aitken	15	8	9	6	13	19	13	8	3	3	18†	18	13	17^{F}	13	7	Ret	13	6	4	10	17†								9th	48
2020	(Switzerland) Ralph Boschung																							14	Ret						9th	48
2020	(Brazil) Guilherme Samaia	16	15	20	17	15	21	21	15	20	19	16	20	Ret	15	21	14	18	16	16	Ret	21	18†	22	19						9th	48
2021		BHR; SP1	BHR; SP2	BHR; FEA	MCO; SP1	MCO; SP2	MCO; FEA	BAK; SP1	BAK; SP2	BAK; FEA	SIL; SP1	SIL; SP2	SIL; FEA	MNZ; SP1	MNZ; SP2	MNZ; FEA	SOC; SP1	SOC; SP2	SOC; FEA	JED; SP1	JED; SP2	JED; FEA	YAS; SP1	YAS; SP2	YAS; FEA						7th	66.5
2021	(Brazil) Gianluca Petecof	17	13	Ret	Ret	Ret	16																								7th	66.5
2021	(Italy) Matteo Nannini							15	11	DNS	15	14	18																		7th	66.5
2021	(Germany) David Beckmann													10	5	16†	15	C	10												7th	66.5
2021	(United Kingdom) Olli Caldwell																			18	12	16	20^{F}	15	18						7th	66.5
2021	(Switzerland) Ralph Boschung	Ret	17^{F}	15	4	5	6	6	Ret	5	14	Ret	14	14	9	14	6	C	19†	15	9	3	9	3	9						7th	66.5
2022		BHR; SPR	BHR; FEA	JED; SPR	JED; FEA	IMO; SPR	IMO; FEA	CAT; SPR	CAT; FEA	MCO; SPR	MCO; FEA	BAK; SPR	BAK; FEA	SIL; SPR	SIL; FEA	RBR; SPR	RBR; FEA	LEC; SPR	LEC; FEA	HUN; SPR	HUN; FEA	SPA; SPR	SPA; FEA	ZAN; SPR	ZAN; FEA	MNZ; SPR	MNZ; FEA	YAS; SPR	YAS; FEA		11th	67
2022	(United Kingdom) Olli Caldwell	19†	17	14	16	17	13	13	14	16	15	19	Ret	18	17	17	6	18	13	10	20†			Ret	8	Ret	Ret	16	20†		11th	67
2022	(Germany) Lirim Zendeli																					20	21†								11th	67
2022	(Switzerland) Ralph Boschung	4	4	15	15	Ret	3	WD	WD	WD	WD	15†	9	WD	WD							3	14	17	17	Ret	Ret	17	Ret		11th	67
2022	(Spain) Roberto Merhi															19†	3	Ret	Ret	14	Ret										11th	67
2023		BHR; SPR	BHR; FEA	JED; SPR	JED; FEA	ALB; SPR	ALB; FEA	BAK; SPR	BAK; FEA	MCO; SPR	MCO; FEA	CAT; SPR	CAT; FEA	RBR; SPR	RBR; FEA	SIL; SPR	SIL; FEA	HUN; SPR	HUN; FEA	SPA; SPR	SPA; FEA	ZAN; SPR	ZAN; FEA	MNZ; SPR	MNZ; FEA	YAS; SPR	YAS; FEA				9th	99
2023	(India) Kush Maini	7	4	5	12	3	9	4	5	13	6	18	17	16	Ret	13	Ret	6	20	18	8	Ret	18	5	Ret	13	9				9th	99
2023	(Switzerland) Ralph Boschung	1	2	4	19	DNS	16	Ret	20	Ret	Ret	16	15	17	14	20	Ret	Ret	19	8	10	Ret	16	19	9	18	15				9th	99
2024		BHR; SPR	BHR; FEA	JED; SPR	JED; FEA	ALB; SPR	ALB; FEA	IMO; SPR	IMO; FEA	MCO; SPR	MCO; FEA	CAT; SPR	CAT; FEA	RBR; SPR	RBR; FEA	SIL; SPR	SIL; FEA	HUN; SPR	HUN; FEA	SPA; SPR	SPA; FEA	MNZ; SPR	MNZ; FEA	BAK; SPR	BAK; FEA	LUS; SPR	LUS; FEA	YAS; SPR	YAS; FEA		2nd	254
2024	(France) Isack Hadjar	4	Ret	15†	Ret	6^{F}	1	Ret	1	8	2	6	5	13	3	Ret	1^{P}	3	18	9	1	10	11	12	14	4	2	5	19		2nd	254
2024	(Spain) Pepe Martí	3	2	7	Ret	Ret	13	16	Ret	Ret	14	11	9	2	15	Ret	10	17	12	Ret	Ret	4	12	19	Ret	Ret	16	1	6		2nd	254
2025		ALB; SPR	ALB; FEA	BHR; SPR	BHR; FEA	JED; SPR	JED; FEA	IMO; SPR	IMO; FEA	MCO; SPR	MCO; FEA	CAT; SPR	CAT; FEA	RBR; SPR	RBR; FEA	SIL; SPR	SIL; FEA	SPA; SPR	SPA; FEA	HUN; SPR	HUN; FEA	MNZ; SPR	MNZ; FEA	BAK; SPR	BAK; FEA	LUS; SPR	LUS; FEA	YAS; SPR	YAS; FEA		3rd	258
2025	(Spain) Pepe Martí	8	C	1	4	2	5	16	14	Ret	Ret	14	6	1	6	10	9	5	4	1	10	9	3	Ret	11						3rd	258
2025	(Bulgaria) Nikola Tsolov																									10	7	3	12		3rd	258
2025	(United Kingdom) Arvid Lindblad	10	C	5	8	1	7	2	4	8	5	8	1^{P}	Ret	12	9	8^{F}	17^{F}	DSQ	10	6	2	Ret	10	6	18	4	1	9		3rd	258
2026		ALB; SPR	ALB; FEA	MIA; SPR	MIA; FEA	MTL; SPR	MTL; FEA	MCO; SPR	MCO; FEA	CAT; SPR	CAT; FEA	RBR; SPR	RBR; FEA	SIL; SPR	SIL; FEA	SPA; SPR	SPA; FEA	HUN; SPR	HUN; FEA	MNZ; SPR	MNZ; FEA	MAD; SPR	MAD; FEA	BAK; SPR	BAK; FE1	BAK; FE2	LUS; SPR	LUS; FEA	YAS; SPR	YAS; FEA	1st	333*
2026	(Mexico) Noel León	2	14	9^{F}	4	1	10	1	9	4	8	10	7^{P}	12	7^{F}	Ret	DSQ	9	1	4	3	4	16	20†	5	8					1st	333*
2026	(Bulgaria) Nikola Tsolov	17	1	1	Ret	14	12	10^{F}	1^{F}	3	4	8	1	1	1	4	3	Ret	7	5	7	Ret	18	5	Ret	2					1st	333*

* Season still in progress.

=== FIA Formula 3 Championship ===
Year	Chassis	Engine	Tyres	Drivers	Races	Wins	Poles	F. Laps	Podiums	D.C.	Pts	T.C.	Pts
2019	Dallara; F3 2019	Mecachrome; V634 V6	P	(Australia) Alex Peroni	13	0	0	0	0	20th	5	10th	5
2019	Dallara; F3 2019	Mecachrome; V634 V6	P	(Germany) David Schumacher	2	0	0	0	0	32nd	0	10th	5
2019	Dallara; F3 2019	Mecachrome; V634 V6	P	(Italy) Alessio Deledda	16	0	0	0	0	29th	0	10th	5
2019	Dallara; F3 2019	Mecachrome; V634 V6	P	(Spain) Sebastián Fernández	16	0	0	0	0	27th	0	10th	5
2020	Dallara; F3 2019	Mecachrome; V634 V6	P	(Australia) Alex Peroni	18	0	0	2	3	10th	64	7th	64
2020	Dallara; F3 2019	Mecachrome; V634 V6	P	(Italy) Alessio Deledda	18	0	0	0	0	34th	0	7th	64
2020	Dallara; F3 2019	Mecachrome; V634 V6	P	(Germany) Sophia Flörsch	16	0	0	0	0	29th	0	7th	64
2020	Dallara; F3 2019	Mecachrome; V634 V6	P	(Germany) Andreas Estner	2	0	0	0	0	35th	0	7th	64
2021	Dallara; F3 2019	Mecachrome; V634 V6	P	(Hungary) László Tóth	17	0	0	0	0	32nd	0	8th	32
2021	Dallara; F3 2019	Mecachrome; V634 V6	P	(France) Pierre-Louis Chovet	3	0	0	0	0	30th	0	8th	32
2021	Dallara; F3 2019	Mecachrome; V634 V6	P	(Italy) Lorenzo Colombo	20	1	0	2	1	15th	32	8th	32
2021	Dallara; F3 2019	Mecachrome; V634 V6	P	(Belgium) Amaury Cordeel	20	0	0	0	0	23rd	0	8th	32
2022	Dallara; F3 2019	Mecachrome; V634 V6	P	(Spain) David Vidales	17	1	0	0	1	16th	29	8th	53
2022	Dallara; F3 2019	Mecachrome; V634 V6	P	(United States) Hunter Yeany	11	0	0	0	0	33rd	0	8th	53
2022	Dallara; F3 2019	Mecachrome; V634 V6	P	(Monaco) Oliver Goethe	4	0	0	0	0	19th	15	8th	53
2022	Dallara; F3 2019	Mecachrome; V634 V6	P	(Colombia) Sebastián Montoya	2	0	0	0	0	21st	7	8th	53
2022	Dallara; F3 2019	Mecachrome; V634 V6	P	(Spain) Pepe Martí	18	0	0	0	0	25th	2	8th	53
2023	Dallara; F3 2019	Mecachrome; V634 V6	P	(Spain) Pepe Martí	18	3	2	2	4	5th	105	4th	179
2023	Dallara; F3 2019	Mecachrome; V634 V6	P	(Australia) Christian Mansell	18	0	0	0	2	12th	60	4th	179
2023	Dallara; F3 2019	Mecachrome; V634 V6	P	(Australia) Hugh Barter	16	0	0	1	0	19th	14	4th	179
2023	Dallara; F3 2019	Mecachrome; V634 V6	P	(Switzerland) Joshua Dufek	2	0	0	0	0	29th	0	4th	179
2024	Dallara; F3 2019	Mecachrome; V634 V6	P	(Germany) Oliver Goethe	18	1	0	2	3	7th	94	4th	179
2024	Dallara; F3 2019	Mecachrome; V634 V6	P	(Denmark) Noah Strømsted	2	0	0	0	0	32nd	0	4th	179
2024	Dallara; F3 2019	Mecachrome; V634 V6	P	(Colombia) Sebastián Montoya	20	0	0	0	1	17th	40	4th	179
2024	Dallara; F3 2019	Mecachrome; V634 V6	P	(Spain) Mari Boya	20	1	0	0	1	15th	45	4th	179
2025	Dallara; F3 2025	Mecachrome; V634 V6	P	(Spain) Mari Boya	19	1	0	1	5	3rd	116	1st	314
2025	Dallara; F3 2025	Mecachrome; V634 V6	P	(Thailand) Tasanapol Inthraphuvasak	19	3	0	0	3	7th	74	1st	314
2025	Dallara; F3 2025	Mecachrome; V634 V6	P	(Bulgaria) Nikola Tsolov	19	2	3	1	6	2nd	124	1st	314
2026	Dallara; F3 2025	Mecachrome; V634 V6	P	(France) Théophile Naël	19	3	3	2	5	5th	88	1st	334
2026	Dallara; F3 2025	Mecachrome; V634 V6	P	(United States) Ugo Ugochukwu	19	2	0	3	7	1st	159	1st	334
2026	Dallara; F3 2025	Mecachrome; V634 V6	P	(Australia) Patrick Heuzenroeder	2	0	0	0	0	32nd	0	1st	334
2026	Dallara; F3 2025	Mecachrome; V634 V6	P	(Mexico) Ernesto Rivera	17	2	0	1	3	7th	87	1st	334

* Season still in progress.

==== In detail ====
(key)

Year	Drivers	1	2	3	4	5	6	7	8	9	10	11	12	13	14	15	16	17	18	19	20	21	T.C.	Points
2019		CAT; FEA	CAT; SPR	LEC; FEA	LEC; SPR	RBR; FEA	RBR; SPR	SIL; FEA	SIL; SPR	HUN; FEA	HUN; SPR	SPA; FEA	SPA; SPR	MNZ; FEA	MNZ; SPR	SOC; FEA	SOC; SPR						10th	5
2019	(Australia) Alex Peroni	12	24	8	14	21	Ret	10	Ret	26	16	Ret	15	Ret	DNS								10th	5
2019	(Germany) David Schumacher															22	20						10th	5
2019	(Italy) Alessio Deledda	Ret	23	16	23	25	24	Ret	25	24	26	28	20	23	25	21	22						10th	5
2019	(Spain) Sebastián Fernández	16	12	Ret	Ret	24	Ret	20	14	13	23	25	13	18	26	16	24†						10th	5
2020		RBR; FEA	RBR; SPR	RBR; FEA	RBR; SPR	HUN; FEA	HUN; SPR	SIL; FEA	SIL; SPR	SIL; FEA	SIL; SPR	CAT; FEA	CAT; SPR	SPA; FEA	SPA; SPR	MNZ; FEA	MNZ; SPR	MUG; FEA	MUG; SPR				7th	64
2020	(Australia) Alex Peroni	3^{F}	Ret	11	11	7	10	6	3	14	24	8	2	14	21	16^{F}	5	20	13				7th	64
2020	(Italy) Alessio Deledda	29	20	27	21	20	23	23	28	25	Ret	28	Ret	Ret	23	23	22	25	26				7th	64
2020	(Germany) Sophia Flörsch	26	16	21	Ret	18	14	22	25	20	19	27	23			21	12	22	24				7th	64
2020	(Germany) Andreas Estner													27	20								7th	64
2021		CAT; SP1	CAT; SP2	CAT; FEA	LEC; SP1	LEC; SP2	LEC; FEA	RBR; SP1	RBR; SP2	RBR; FEA	HUN; SP1	HUN; SP2	HUN; FEA	SPA; SP1	SPA; SP2	SPA; FEA	ZAN; SP1	ZAN; SP2	ZAN; FEA	SOC; SP1	SOC; SP2	SOC; FEA	8th	32
2021	(Hungary) László Tóth	27	23	26				19	21	21	27	23	Ret	25	22	23	25	16	24	Ret	C	22	8th	32
2021	(France) Pierre-Louis Chovet				18	15	28†																8th	32
2021	(Italy) Lorenzo Colombo	23	22	29	14	20	19	25	19	13	7^{F}	7	11	1^{F}	14	14	13	Ret	17	6	C	Ret	8th	32
2021	(Belgium) Amaury Cordeel	26	16	25	27	24	25	22	11	18	19	Ret	26	17	Ret	Ret	23	Ret	12	21	C	16	8th	32
2022		BHR; SPR	BHR; FEA	IMO; SPR	IMO; FEA	CAT; SPR	CAT; FEA	SIL; SPR	SIL; FEA	RBR; SPR	RBR; FEA	HUN; SPR	HUN; FEA	SPA; SPR	SPA; FEA	ZAN; SPR	ZAN; FEA	MNZ; SPR	MNZ; FEA				8th	53
2022	(Spain) David Vidales	10	8	11	8	1	Ret	12	9	18	12	Ret	13	7	8	21	Ret	DNS	Ret				8th	53
2022	(United States) Hunter Yeany	23	21	17	16	27	26	16	19	22	WD							24	17				8th	53
2022	(Monaco) Oliver Goethe											8	28	Ret	4								8th	53
2022	(Colombia) Sebastián Montoya															8	8						8th	53
2022	(Spain) Pepe Martí	28†	13	Ret	15	13	20	20	23	13	Ret	14	29	Ret	22	19	14	9	26				8th	53
2023		BHR; SPR	BHR; FEA	ALB; SPR	ALB; FEA	MCO; SPR	MCO; FEA	CAT; SPR	CAT; FEA	RBR; SPR	RBR; FEA	SIL; SPR	SIL; FEA	HUN; SPR	HUN; FEA	SPA; SPR	SPA; FEA	MNZ; SPR	MNZ; FEA				4th	179
2023	(Spain) Pepe Martí	1^{F}	6	13	7	1	9	8	1^{P F}	6	9	10	3	20	6	Ret	9^{P}	Ret	Ret				4th	179
2023	(Australia) Christian Mansell	13	13	9	10	20	17	Ret	10	14	7	3	5	6	11	19	2	7	8				4th	179
2023	(Australia) Hugh Barter	11	26	19	15	25^{F}	26	19	13	22	8	6	13	25	13	6	22						4th	179
2023	(Switzerland) Joshua Dufek																	14	14				4th	179
2024		BHR; SPR	BHR; FEA	ALB; SPR	ALB; FEA	IMO; SPR	IMO; FEA	MCO; SPR	MCO; FEA	CAT; SPR	CAT; FEA	RBR; SPR	RBR; FEA	SIL; SPR	SIL; FEA	HUN; SPR	HUN; FEA	SPA; SPR	SPA; FEA	MNZ; SPR	MNZ; FEA		4th	179
2024	(Germany) Oliver Goethe	9	10	5	9	1^{F}	2^{F}	10	10	3	4	7	5	Ret	6	11	8	6	19				4th	179
2024	(Denmark) Noah Strømsted																			17	23†		4th	179
2024	(Colombia) Sebastián Montoya	18	17	8	6	25	10	18	15	Ret	12	Ret	Ret	7	Ret	19	19	5	2	11	21		4th	179
2024	(Spain) Mari Boya	8	29	4	7	Ret	9	6	7	1	14	22	18	16	23	18	10	28	Ret	7	Ret		4th	179
2025		ALB; SPR	ALB; FEA	BHR; SPR	BHR; FEA	IMO; SPR	IMO; FEA	MCO; SPR	MCO; FEA	CAT; SPR	CAT; FEA	RBR; SPR	RBR; FEA	SIL; SPR	SIL; FEA	SPA; SPR	SPA; FEA	HUN; SPR	HUN; FEA	MNZ; SPR	MNZ; FEA		1st	314
2025	(Spain) Mari Boya	13	17	15	8	Ret	5	8	3	7	22	5	3^{F}	3	1	14	C	7	2	5	9		1st	314
2025	(Thailand) Tasanapol Inthraphuvasak	4	7	18	16	19	17	23	12	9	11	4	15	1	13	6	C	1	10	12	1		1st	314
2025	(Bulgaria) Nikola Tsolov	8	Ret	1	5	3	9	24	1^{P F}	3	5	3	DSQ^{P}	29	20^{P}	4	C	15	6	22	2		1st	314
2026		ALB; SPR	ALB; FEA	MCO; SPR	MCO; FEA	CAT; SPR	CAT; FEA	RBR; SPR	RBR; FEA	SIL; SPR	SIL; FEA	SPA; SPR	SPA; FEA	HUN; SPR	HUN; FEA	MNZ; SPR	MNZ; FEA	MAD; SPR	MAD; FE1	MAD; FE2			1st	334
2026	(France) Théophile Naël	10	12^{P}	24	2^{P}	8	1^{P}	15	15^{F}	3	14	6	15	1	20	11	17	1^{F}	9	12			1st	334
2026	(United States) Ugo Ugochukwu	8	1	6	4	Ret	3	9	2	1^{F}	3	29^{F}	20^{F}	17	2	13	8	8	4	2			1st	334
2026	(Australia) Patrick Heuzenroeder	23	17																				1st	334
2026	(Mexico) Ernesto Rivera			Ret	5	Ret	7	1	18	14	10^{F}	8	1	3	6	7	Ret	6	8	9			1st	334

* Season still in progress.

=== F4 Spanish Championship ===
Year	Car	Drivers	Races	Wins	Poles	F/Laps	Podiums	Points	D.C.	T.C.
2021	Tatuus F4-T014	(Denmark) Sebastian Øgaard	21	5	0	1	8	231	2nd	2nd
2021	Tatuus F4-T014	(Spain) Pepe Martí	21	2	3	4	9	196	3rd	2nd
2021	Tatuus F4-T014	(Mexico) Alex García	21	0	0	0	0	2	24th	2nd
2021	Tatuus F4-T014	(Ukraine) Oleksandr Partyshev	21	0	0	0	0	0	25th	2nd
2022	Tatuus F4-T421	(Bulgaria) Nikola Tsolov	21	13	15	17	18	400	1st	1st
2022	Tatuus F4-T421	(Australia) Hugh Barter	21	6	4	4	13	287	2nd	1st
2022	Tatuus F4-T421	(Denmark) Georg Kelstrup	21	0	0	0	1	105	5th	1st
2022	Tatuus F4-T421	(Bulgaria) Nikola Tsolov	21	13	15	17	18	400	1st	5th
2022	Tatuus F4-T421	(Serbia) Filip Jenić	15	0	0	0	1	64	8th	5th
2022	Tatuus F4-T421	(Portugal) Manuel Espírito Santo†	21	0	0	0	2	59	12th	5th
2022	Tatuus F4-T421	(Austria) Charlie Wurz	3	0	0	0	1	25	15th	5th
2022	Tatuus F4-T421	(Mexico) Jesse Carrasquedo Jr.	9	0	0	0	0	0	32nd	5th
2023	Tatuus F4-T421	(France) Enzo Deligny	21	2	0	2	10	240	4th	2nd
2023	Tatuus F4-T421	(Italy) Matteo De Palo	21	1	1	1	4	171	5th	2nd
2023	Tatuus F4-T421	(Peru) Andrés Cárdenas	18	1	2	1	2	109	8th	2nd
2023	Tatuus F4-T421	(Singapore) Christian Ho	21	5	7	6	13	291	2nd	3rd
2023	Tatuus F4-T421	(Denmark) Noah Strømsted	20	0	0	1	3	135	7th	3rd
2023	Tatuus F4-T421	(Mexico) Jesse Carrasquedo Jr.	21	0	0	0	0	4	19th	3rd
2024	Tatuus F4-T421	(Mexico) Ernesto Rivera	21	1	0	0	2	148	5th	3rd
2024	Tatuus F4-T421	(Poland) Jan Przyrowski	21	0	0	3	2	91	10th	3rd
2024	Tatuus F4-T421	(Peru) Andrés Cárdenas	21	0	0	0	0	28	14th	3rd
2024	Tatuus F4-T421	(United States) James Egozi	21	0	1	0	3	143	6th	4th
2024	Tatuus F4-T421	(United Kingdom) Nathan Tye	21	0	0	0	2	72	11th	4th
2024	Tatuus F4-T421	(Thailand) Enzo Tarnvanichkul	21	0	0	0	1	69	12th	4th
2025	Tatuus F4-T421	(Belgium) Thomas Strauven	21	10	10	11	17	392	1st	1st
2025	Tatuus F4-T421	(Poland) Jan Przyrowski	21	3	7	2	10	226	3rd	1st
2025	Tatuus F4-T421	(Slovakia) Matúš Ryba	21	0	0	0	0	18	15th	1st
2025	Tatuus F4-T421	(Portugal) Noah Monteiro	21	0	0	0	0	97	8th	4th
2025	Tatuus F4-T421	(United States) Vivek Kanthan	21	0	0	0	1	86	9th	4th
2025	Tatuus F4-T421	(Brazil) Miguel Costa	21	0	0	0	0	27	14th	4th
2026	Tatuus F4-T421	(Portugal) Noah Monteiro	21	2	2	3	9	210	2nd	2nd
2026	Tatuus F4-T421	(United States) Vivek Kanthan	21	2	2	2	6	166	6th	2nd
2026	Tatuus F4-T421	(Canada) Ty Fisher	21	0	0	0	0	82	11th	2nd
2026	Tatuus F4-T421	(Republic of Ireland) Daniel Kelleher	21	0	0	0	1	90	10th	6th
2026	Tatuus F4-T421	(Malta) Jacob Micallef	21	0	1	0	1	38	13th	6th
2026	Tatuus F4-T421	(Spain) Luna Fluxá	21	0	0	0	0	6	20th	6th
2026	Tatuus F4-T421	(Spain) Miki Blascos	21	0	0	0	0	27	15th	8th (Note: Entered as Monlau Motorsport.)
2026	Tatuus F4-T421	(Netherlands) Juste Mulder	15	0	0	0	0	9	18th	8th
2026	Tatuus F4-T421	(Argentina) Fausto Arnaudo	18	0	0	0	0	4	21st	8th
2026	Tatuus F4-T421	(United States) Rahim Alibhai	13	0	0	0	0	2	23rd	8th
2026	Tatuus F4-T421	(Japan) Yuzuki Sato‡	18	0	0	0	0	0	29th	8th
2026	Tatuus F4-T421	(Italy) Alexander Chartier	3	0	0	0	0	0	50th	8th
2026	Tatuus F4-T421	(Argentina) Thiago Palotini	3	0	0	0	0	0	51st	8th
2026	Tatuus F4-T421	(Spain) Egor Ivanchenko	1	0	0	0	0	0	55th	8th

† Espírito Santo drove for Teo Martín Motorsport until round 2.

‡ Sato drove for TC Racing from round 4 onwards.

=== Formula Winter Series ===
Year	Car	Drivers	Races	Wins	Poles	F/Laps	Podiums	Points	D.C.	T.C
2023	Tatuus F4-T421	(Italy) Matteo De Palo	2	1	2	0	1	37	6th	N/A
2023	Tatuus F4-T421	(Spain) Nerea Martí	2	0	0	0	0	9	14th	N/A
2023	Tatuus F4-T421	(Uruguay) Maite Cáceres	4	0	0	0	0	9	15th	N/A
2023	Tatuus F4-T421	(France) Lola Lovinfosse	2	0	0	0	0	4	18th	N/A
2024	Tatuus F4-T421	(Peru) Andrés Cárdenas	11	2	2	1	6	152	2nd	3rd
2024	Tatuus F4-T421	(United States) James Egozi	6	1	1	1	1	54	9th	3rd
2024	Tatuus F4-T421	(Mexico) Ernesto Rivera	11	0	0	0	1	24	15th	3rd
2024	Tatuus F4-T421	(United Kingdom) Nathan Tye	5	0	1	0	0	17	17th	3rd
2024	Tatuus F4-T421	(Poland) Jan Przyrowski	5	0	0	0	0	8	22nd	3rd
2024	Tatuus F4-T421	(France) Pacôme Weisenburger	5	0	0	0	0	2	26th	3rd
2024	Tatuus F4-T421	(United Kingdom) Finn Harrison	11	0	0	0	0	1	30th	3rd
2024	Tatuus F4-T421	(Thailand) Enzo Tarnvanichkul	5	0	0	0	0	0	32nd	3rd
2024	Tatuus F4-T421	(Germany) Carrie Schreiner	4	0	0	0	0	0	39th	3rd
2025	Tatuus F4-T421	(United Kingdom) Alisha Palmowski	6	0	0	0	0	0	24th	10th
2025	Tatuus F4-T421	(Brazil) Rafaela Ferreira	6	0	0	0	0	0	26th	10th
2025	Tatuus F4-T421	(United States) Chloe Chambers	6	0	0	0	0	0	31st	10th
2026	Tatuus F4-T421	(Switzerland) Chiara Bättig	15	0	0	0	1	19	17th	7th
2026	Tatuus F4-T421	(United Kingdom) Alisha Palmowski	6	0	1	0	0	12	19th	7th
2026	Tatuus F4-T421	(Sweden) Leon Hedfors	9	0	0	0	0	1	30th	7th
2026	Tatuus F4-T421	(Romania) Zoe Florescu	6	0	0	0	0	0	39th	7th
2026	Tatuus F4-T421	(United Kingdom) Megan Bruce	3	0	0	0	0	0	40th	7th
2026	Tatuus F4-T421	(Brazil) Rafaela Ferreira	3	0	0	0	0	0	41st	7th
2026	Tatuus F4-T421	(United Kingdom) Timo Jüngling	3	0	0	0	0	0	NC	7th

=== Eurocup-3 ===
Year	Car	Drivers	Races	Wins	Poles	F/Laps	Podiums	Points	D.C.	T.C.
2023	Tatuus F3 T-318	(France) Esteban Masson	16	8	6	7	10	273	1st	1st
2023	Tatuus F3 T-318	(Italy) Francesco Braschi	16	2	1	1	6	156	5th	1st
2023	Tatuus F3 T-318	(Thailand) Tasanapol Inthraphuvasak	15	0	2	0	4	142	6th	1st
2023	Tatuus F3 T-318	(Morocco) Suleiman Zanfari	15	0	0	0	1	49	9th	1st
2024	Tatuus F3 T-318	(Singapore) Christian Ho	16	5	6	5	9	248	2nd	2nd
2024	Tatuus F3 T-318	(Germany) Valentin Kluss	16	0	1	1	3	121	6th	2nd
2024	Tatuus F3 T-318	(South Korea) Michael Shin	16	0	0	0	4	98	7th	2nd
2024	Tatuus F3 T-318	(Mexico) Jesse Carrasquedo Jr.	10	1	1	1	2	80	8th	2nd
2024	Tatuus F3 T-318	(Australia) Noah Lisle	16	0	0	0	0	47	12th	2nd
2024	Tatuus F3 T-318	(Morocco) Suleiman Zanfari	4	0	0	0	0	11	17th	2nd
2025	Tatuus F3 T-318	(Mexico) Ernesto Rivera	18	3	2	1	7	176	4th	2nd
2025	Tatuus F3 T-318	(France) Jules Caranta	18	0	1	0	4	126	6th	2nd
2025	Tatuus F3 T-318	(Thailand) Enzo Tarnvanichkul	18	1	1	0	3	98	8th	2nd
2025	Tatuus F3 T-318	(Poland) Kacper Sztuka	18	2	2	4	7	200	3rd	3rd
2025	Tatuus F3 T-318	(Mexico) Jesse Carrasquedo Jr.	18	2	3	3	4	152	5th	3rd
2025	Tatuus F3 T-318	(Portugal) Francisco Macedo	18	0	0	0	1	37	14th	3rd
2026	Dallara 326-TOM'S	(United States) Alex Powell	13	0	0	0	2	82	7th	4th
2026	Dallara 326-TOM'S	(Belgium) Thomas Strauven	19	0	0	0	1	61	11th	4th
2026	Dallara 326-TOM'S	(Australia) Patrick Heuzenroeder	12	1	0	0	1	51	12th	4th
2026	Dallara 326-TOM'S	(Thailand) Enzo Tarnvanichkul	18	0	0	0	2	50	13th	4th
2026	Dallara 326-TOM'S	(Italy) Maximilian Popov	7	0	0	0	1	17	17th	4th
2026	Dallara 326-TOM'S	(Portugal) Francisco Macedo	2	0	0	0	0	1	22nd	4th
2026	Dallara 326-TOM'S	(Singapore) Kabir Anurag	2	0	0	0	0	0	NC	4th
2026	Dallara 326-TOM'S	(Monaco) Matteo Giaccardi	2	0	0	0	0	0	NC	4th

=== F1 Academy ===
Year	Car	Drivers	Races	Wins	Poles	F/Laps	Podiums	Points	D.C.	T.C.
2023	Tatuus F4-T421	(Spain) Nerea Martí	21	1	1	1	6	181	4th	5th
2023	Tatuus F4-T421	(France) Lola Lovinfosse	21	0	0	0	3	65	10th	5th
2023	Tatuus F4-T421	(Uruguay) Maite Cáceres	21	0	0	0	0	6	15th	5th
2024	Tatuus F4-T421	(Spain) Nerea Martí	14	0	0	0	4	136	4th	3rd
2024	Tatuus F4-T421	(United States) Chloe Chambers	14	1	0	2	4	122	6th	3rd
2024	Tatuus F4-T421	(Germany) Carrie Schreiner	14	0	0	0	0	34	9th	3rd
2025	Tatuus F4-T421	(United States) Chloe Chambers	13	2	4	4	7	127	3rd	2nd
2025	Tatuus F4-T421	(United Kingdom) Alisha Palmowski	14	1	0	0	5	91	5th	2nd
2025	Tatuus F4-T421	(Brazil) Rafaela Ferreira	14	0	0	0	0	18	12th	2nd
2026	Tatuus F4-T421	(United Kingdom) Megan Bruce								
2026	Tatuus F4-T421	(Brazil) Rafaela Ferreira								
2026	Tatuus F4-T421	(United Kingdom) Alisha Palmowski								

* Season still in progress.

== Former series results ==
=== GP2 Series ===
Year	Car	Drivers	Races	Wins	Poles	FLaps	Points	D.C.	T.C.
2005	Dallara GP2/05-Mecachrome	(Argentina) Juan Cruz Álvarez	23	0	0	0	4.5	18th	12th
2005	Dallara GP2/05-Mecachrome	(Spain) Sergio Hernández	23	0	0	0	3	20th	12th
2006	Dallara GP2/05-Mecachrome	(Spain) Adrián Vallés	21	0	0	1	7	18th	12th
2006	Dallara GP2/05-Mecachrome	(Spain) Félix Porteiro	21	0	0	0	5	22nd	12th
2007	Dallara GP2/05-Mecachrome	(Italy) Giorgio Pantano	21	2	1	1	59	3rd	3rd
2007	Dallara GP2/05-Mecachrome	(Russia) Vitaly Petrov	21	1	0	0	21	13th	3rd
2008	Dallara GP2/08-Mecachrome	(Brazil) Lucas di Grassi	14	3	0	2	63	3rd	1st
2008	Dallara GP2/08-Mecachrome	(Russia) Vitaly Petrov	20	1	0	1	39	7th	1st
2008	Dallara GP2/08-Mecachrome	(United Kingdom) Ben Hanley	6	0	0	0	1	24th	1st
2009 – 2013: "Campos" did not compete.
2014	Dallara GP2/11-Mecachrome	(France) Arthur Pic	22	1	0	0	124	7th	6th
2014	Dallara GP2/11-Mecachrome	(United States) Alexander Rossi†	12	0	0	0	12	21st	6th
2014	Dallara GP2/11-Mecachrome	(Japan) Kimiya Sato	20	0	0	0	2	27th	6th
2015	Dallara GP2/11-Mecachrome	(Indonesia) Rio Haryanto	21	3	0	1	138	4th	4th
2015	Dallara GP2/11-Mecachrome	(France) Arthur Pic	21	0	0	0	60	11th	4th
2016	Dallara GP2/11-Mecachrome	(New Zealand) Mitch Evans	22	1	0	2	90	12th	6th
2016	Dallara GP2/11-Mecachrome	(Indonesia) Sean Gelael	22	0	0	0	24	15th	6th

- † Alexander Rossi raced for Caterham Racing for 10 races in 2014 scoring 10 of his 12 points.
- In 2008, the team raced under the Barwa International Campos Team banner.
- In 2016, the team raced under the Indonesia licence name Pertamina Campos Racing banner.

=== GP3 Series ===
Year	Car	Drivers	Races	Wins	Poles	FLaps	Points	D.C.	T.C.
2015	Dallara GP3/13-Renault	(Spain) Álex Palou	22	1	0	1	51	10th	7th
2015	Dallara GP3/13-Renault	(Kuwait) Zaid Ashkanani	22	0	0	0	0	24th	7th
2015	Dallara GP3/13-Renault	(France) Brandon Maïsano	2	0	0	0	0	25th	7th
2015	Dallara GP3/13-Renault	(Russia) Konstantin Tereshchenko	6	0	0	0	0	29th	7th
2015	Dallara GP3/13-Renault	(Venezuela) Samin Gómez	6	0	0	0	0	30th	7th
2015	Dallara GP3/13-Renault	(Austria) Christopher Höher	2	0	0	0	0	31st	7th
2016	Dallara GP3/16-Mecachrome	(Netherlands) Steijn Schothorst	18	0	0	0	36	13th	7th
2016	Dallara GP3/16-Mecachrome	(Spain) Álex Palou	18	0	0	0	22	15th	7th
2016	Dallara GP3/16-Mecachrome	(Russia) Konstantin Tereshchenko	18	0	0	0	8	19th	7th
2017	Dallara GP3/16-Mecachrome	(South Africa) Raoul Hyman	17	1	0	0	27	13th	5th
2017	Dallara GP3/16-Mecachrome	(France) Julien Falchero	17	0	0	0	15	15th	5th
2017	Dallara GP3/16-Mecachrome	(Argentina) Marcos Siebert	17	0	0	0	14	16th	5th
2018	Dallara GP3/16-Mecachrome	(Italy) Leonardo Pulcini	18	2	2	2	156	4th	3rd
2018	Dallara GP3/16-Mecachrome	(Finland) Simo Laaksonen	18	0	0	0	36	14th	3rd
2018	Dallara GP3/16-Mecachrome	(Mexico) Diego Menchaca	18	0	0	0	3	19th	3rd

=== WTCC ===
Year	Car	Drivers	Races	Wins	Poles	FLaps	Points	D.C.	T.C.
2013	SEAT León WTCC	(France) Hugo Valente	14	0	0	0	4	20th	13th
2013	SEAT León WTCC	(Spain) Fernando Monje	22	0	0	0	1	24th	13th
2013	SEAT León WTCC	(Russia) Nikolay Karamyshev	4	0	0	0	0	37th	13th
2013	SEAT León WTCC	(Japan) Yukinori Taniguchi	2	0	0	0	0	38th	13th
2013	SEAT León WTCC	(Hong Kong) Michael Soong	2	0	0	0	0	41st	13th
2013	SEAT León WTCC	(Latvia) Konstantins Calko	2	0	0	0	0	44th	13th
2014	Chevrolet RML Cruze TC1	(France) Hugo Valente	24	0	0	0	85	12th	3rd
2014	Chevrolet RML Cruze TC1	(Serbia) Dušan Borković	22	0	0	0	41	14th	3rd
2014	Chevrolet RML Cruze TC1	(Spain) Pepe Oriola	2	0	0	0	0	31st	3rd
2014	SEAT León WTCC	(France) John Filippi	24	0	0	0	4	18th	3rd
2014	SEAT León WTCC	(Hong Kong) Henry Kwong	4	0	0	0	0	23rd	3rd
2014	SEAT León WTCC	(Czech Republic) Petr Fulin	4	0	0	0	0	24th	3rd
2014	SEAT León WTCC	(Russia) Nikita Misiulia	2	0	0	0	0	26th	3rd
2014	SEAT León WTCC	(Hungary) Norbert Nagy	2	0	0	0	0	28th	3rd
2014	SEAT León WTCC	(Hong Kong) William Lok	4	0	0	0	0	29th	3rd
2014	SEAT León WTCC	(Hong Kong) Michael Soong	2	0	0	0	0	30th	3rd
2015	Chevrolet RML Cruze TC1	(France) Hugo Valente	24	0	0	0	120	9th	2nd
2015	Chevrolet RML Cruze TC1	(France) John Filippi	24	0	0	0	6	18th	2nd
2015	Chevrolet RML Cruze TC1	(Thailand) Tin Sritrai	2	0	0	0	3	22nd	2nd
2015	Chevrolet RML Cruze TC1	(Slovakia) Mat'o Homola	2	0	0	0	0	26th	2nd
2015	Chevrolet RML Cruze TC1	(Qatar) Nasser Al-Attiyah	2	0	0	0	0	27th	2nd
2016	Chevrolet RML Cruze TC1	(Argentina) Esteban Guerrieri	2	0	0	0	9	17th	4th
2016	Chevrolet RML Cruze TC1	(France) John Filippi	24	0	0	0	9	18th	4th
2017	Chevrolet RML Cruze TC1	(Argentina) Esteban Guerrieri†	14	2	0	3	241	4th	3rd
2017	Chevrolet RML Cruze TC1	(Switzerland) Kris Richard	4	0	0	0	10	16th	3rd
2017	Chevrolet RML Cruze TC1	(Hong Kong) Wong Po Wah	2	0	0	0	0	24th	3rd

- † Esteban Guerrieri raced for Honda Racing Team JAS for 6 races in 2017 scoring 94 of his 241 points.

=== WTCR ===
Year	Car	Drivers	Races	Wins	Poles	FLaps	Points	D.C.	T.C.
2018	CUPRA León TCR	(Spain) Pepe Oriola	30	1	0	2	245	6th	7th
2018	CUPRA León TCR	(France) John Filippi	30	0	0	0	14	26th	7th

- In 2018, the team raced under the Team Oscaro by Campos Racing banner.

=== Euroformula Open Championship ===
Year	Car	Drivers	Races	Wins	Poles	FLaps	Points	D.C.	T.C.
2012	Dallara F312 Toyota	(Argentina) Facu Regalia	24	3	3	2	186	4th	3rd
2012	Dallara F312 Toyota	(Russia) Denis Nagulin	24	0	0	0	6	21st	3rd
2013	Dallara F312 Toyota	(Venezuela) Valeria Carballo	24	0	0	1	20	12th	NC
2013	Dallara F312 Toyota	(Poland) Artur Janosz	24	0	0	0	16	13th	NC
2013	Dallara F312 Toyota	(Russia) Denis Nagulin	24	0	0	0	9	19th	NC
2014	Dallara F312 Toyota	(Spain) Álex Palou	24	3	3	4	242	3rd	2nd
2014	Dallara F312 Toyota	(Russia) Konstantin Tereshchenko	24	0	0	0	75	6th	2nd
2014	Dallara F312 Toyota	(United Kingdom) Sean Walkinshaw	24	0	0	0	53	10th	2nd
2015	Dallara F312 Toyota	(Russia) Konstantin Tereshchenko	24	6	8	6	286	2nd	2nd
2015	Dallara F312 Toyota	(Mexico) Diego Menchaca	24	0	0	0	94	8th	2nd
2015	Dallara F312 Toyota	(Brazil) Henrique Baptista	24	0	0	0	14	15th	2nd
2015	Dallara F312 Toyota	(Kuwait) Ahmad Al Ghanem	24	0	0	0	4	17th	2nd
2016	Dallara F312 Toyota	(Italy) Leonardo Pulcini	24	7	3	8	303	1st	1st
2016	Dallara F312 Toyota	(Mexico) Diego Menchaca	24	0	0	1	145	4th	1st
2016	Dallara F312 Toyota	(Ecuador) Julio Moreno	24	0	0	0	30	14th	1st
2016	Dallara F312 Toyota	(Azerbaijan) Gülhüseyn Abdullayev	24	0	0	0	0	26th	1st
2017	Dallara F312 Toyota	(Finland) Simo Laaksonen	16	0	0	0	100	6th	4th
2017	Dallara F312 Toyota	(Brazil) Thiago Vivacqua	16	1	0	1	98	7th	4th
2017	Dallara F312 Toyota	(Brazil) Matheus Iorio	16	0	0	0	52	9th	4th
2017	Dallara F312 Toyota	(Romania) Petru Florescu	16	0	0	0	14	10th†	4th
2018	Dallara F312 Toyota	(Poland) Alex Karkosik	10	0	0	0	66	8th†	4th
2018	Dallara F312 Toyota	(Romania) Petru Florescu	2	0	0	0	21	13th†	4th
2018	Dallara F312 Toyota	(United States) Brad Benavides	2	0	0	0	0	NC	4th
2018	Dallara F312 Toyota	(United States) Yves Baltas	10	0	0	0	18	16th	4th
2018	Dallara F312 Toyota	(Argentina) Marcos Siebert	16	1	1	1	195	3rd	4th

† Shared results with other teams

== Results in detail ==
=== GP2 Series ===
(key) (Races in bold indicate pole position) (Races in italics indicate fastest lap)

Year	Chassis Engine Tyres	Drivers	1	2	3	4	5	6	7	8	9	10	11	12	13	14	15	16	17	18	19	20	21	22	23	T.C.	Points
2005	GP2/05; Renault; **B**		SMR; FEA	SMR; SPR	CAT; FEA	CAT; SPR	MON; FEA	NÜR; FEA	NÜR; SPR	MAG; FEA	MAG; SPR	SIL; FEA	SIL; SPR	HOC; FEA	HOC; SPR	HUN; FEA	HUN; SPR	IST; FEA	IST; SPR	MNZ; FEA	MNZ; SPR	SPA; FEA	SPA; SPR	BHR; FEA	BHR; SPR	12th	7.5
2005	GP2/05; Renault; **B**	(Argentina) Juan Cruz Álvarez	Ret	7	Ret	12	Ret	18†	15	Ret	Ret	11	Ret	10	NC	Ret	7	15	Ret	12	17†	5	6	10	12	12th	7.5
2005	GP2/05; Renault; **B**	(Spain) Sergio Hernández	11	8	Ret	18†	8	15	5	13	14	16	12	Ret	19	Ret	18†	Ret	20†	Ret	7	Ret	20†	15	18	12th	7.5
2006	GP2/05; Renault; **B**		VAL; FEA	VAL; SPR	SMR; FEA	SMR; SPR	NÜR; FEA	NÜR; SPR	CAT; FEA	CAT; SPR	MON; FEA	SIL; FEA	SIL; SPR	MAG; FEA	MAG; SPR	HOC; FEA	HOC; SPR	HUN; FEA	HUN; SPR	IST; FEA	IST; SPR	MNZ; FEA	MNZ; SPR			12th	12
2006	GP2/05; Renault; **B**	(Spain) Adrián Vallés	3	Ret	9	Ret	Ret	14	18	16	Ret	9	Ret	15	13	18	Ret	Ret	7	Ret	14	Ret	11			12th	12
2006	GP2/05; Renault; **B**	(Spain) Félix Porteiro	Ret	Ret	10	6	16	Ret	17	Ret	6	8	DSQ	18	10	12	18	Ret	12	19†	Ret	Ret	NC			12th	12
2007	GP2/05; Renault; **B**		BHR; FEA	BHR; SPR	CAT; FEA	CAT; SPR	MON; FEA	MAG; FEA	MAG; SPR	SIL; FEA	SIL; SPR	NÜR; FEA	NÜR; SPR	HUN; FEA	HUN; SPR	IST; FEA	IST; SPR	MNZ; FEA	MNZ; SPR	SPA; FEA	SPA; SPR	VAL; FEA	VAL; SPR			3rd	80
2007	GP2/05; Renault; **B**	(Russia) Vitaly Petrov	14	11	10	16†	6	5	5	9	9	11	17	Ret	9	17	5	12	12	9	11	1	8			3rd	80
2007	GP2/05; Renault; **B**	(Italy) Giorgio Pantano	DNS	Ret	Ret	6	2	1	3	Ret	8	4	7	Ret	7	2	12	**1**	DSQ	Ret	14	2	5			3rd	80
2008	GP2/08; Renault; **B**		CAT; FEA	CAT; SPR	IST; FEA	IST; SPR	MON; FEA	MON; FEA	MAG; FEA	MAG; SPR	SIL; FEA	SIL; SPR	HOC; FEA	HOC; SPR	HUN; FEA	HUN; SPR	VAL; FEA	VAL; SPR	SPA; FEA	SPA; SPR	MNZ; FEA	MNZ; SPR				1st	103
2008	GP2/08; Renault; **B**	(Russia) Vitaly Petrov	6	Ret	5	2	Ret	15	4	18†	10	5	Ret	12	Ret	9	1	15†	4	3	Ret	Ret				1st	103
2008	GP2/08; Renault; **B**	(United Kingdom) Ben Hanley	Ret	9	17	6	16	14																		1st	103
2008	GP2/08; Renault; **B**	(Brazil) Lucas di Grassi							2	4	2	2	5	Ret	1	10	4	1	20†	5	1	11				1st	103
2009 – 2013: "Campos" did not compete.
2014	GP2/11; Mecachrome; **P**		BHR; FEA	BHR; SPR	CAT; FEA	CAT; SPR	MON; FEA	MON; SPR	RBR; FEA	RBR; SPR	SIL; FEA	SIL; SPR	HOC; FEA	HOC; SPR	HUN; FEA	HUN; SPR	SPA; FEA	SPA; SPR	MNZ; FEA	MNZ; SPR	SOC; FEA	SOC; SPR	YMC; FEA	YMC; SPR		7th	128
2014	GP2/11; Mecachrome; **P**	(France) Arthur Pic	5	9	6	4	6	5	10	13	11	22†	19	Ret	1	6	15	20	2	7	4	5	8	3		7th	128
2014	GP2/11; Mecachrome; **P**	(Japan) Kimiya Sato	Ret	19	19	15	15	14	Ret	19	23	20			Ret	Ret	17	18	Ret	12	13	7	14	22		7th	128
2014	GP2/11; Mecachrome; **P**	(United States) Alexander Rossi											Ret	7												7th	128
2015	GP2/11; Mecachrome; **P**		BHR; FEA	BHR; SPR	CAT; FEA	CAT; SPR	MON; FEA	MON; SPR	RBR; FEA	RBR; SPR	SIL; FEA	SIL; SPR	HUN; FEA	HUN; SPR	SPA; FEA	SPA; SPR	MNZ; FEA	MNZ; SPR	SOC; FEA	SOC; SPR	BHR; FEA	BHR; SPR	YMC; FEA	YMC; SPR		4th	198
2015	GP2/11; Mecachrome; **P**	(France) Arthur Pic	Ret	10	9	8	4	6	9	11	14	16	13	10	2	Ret	7	2	8	13	10	16	17	C		4th	198
2015	GP2/11; Mecachrome; **P**	(Indonesia) Rio Haryanto	2	1	4	6	16	Ret	7	1	8	1	4	5	13	10	13	11	5	2	7	18	7	C		4th	198
2016	GP2/11; Mecachrome; **P**		CAT; FEA	CAT; SPR	MON; FEA	MON; SPR	BAK; FEA	BAK; SPR	RBR; FEA	RBR; SPR	SIL; FEA	SIL; SPR	HUN; FEA	HUN; SPR	HOC; FEA	HOC; SPR	SPA; FEA	SPA; SPR	MNZ; FEA	MNZ; SPR	SEP; FEA	SEP; SPR	YMC; FEA	YMC; SPR		6th	114
2016	GP2/11; Mecachrome; **P**	(New Zealand) Mitch Evans	12	14	5	4	5	Ret	1	8	4	13	10	5	Ret	10	16	13	8	Ret	8	6	15	8		6th	114
2016	GP2/11; Mecachrome; **P**	(Indonesia) Sean Gelael	17	13	13	Ret	7	Ret	2	Ret	21	18	22	10	Ret	Ret	18	15	DSQ	16	16	Ret	Ret	21		6th	114

=== GP2 Asia Series ===
(key) (Races in bold indicate pole position) (Races in italics indicate fastest lap)

Year	Chassis Engine Tyres	Drivers	1	2	3	4	5	6	7	8	9	10	T.C.	Points
2008	GP2/05; Renault; **B**		DUB1; FEA	DUB1; SPR	SEN; FEA	SEN; SPR	SEP; FEA	SEP; SPR	BHR; FEA	BHR; SPR	DUB2; FEA	DUB2; SPR	3rd	39
2008	GP2/05; Renault; **B**	(Russia) Vitaly Petrov	DNS	9	**5**	3	1	3	10	3	4	Ret	3rd	39
2008	GP2/05; Renault; **B**	(Brazil) Diego Nunes	12	DNS									3rd	39
2008	GP2/05; Renault; **B**	(United Kingdom) Ben Hanley			3	16	Ret	14	Ret	10	Ret	Ret	3rd	39

=== GP3 Series ===
(key) (Races in bold indicate pole position) (Races in italics indicate fastest lap)

Year	Chassis Engine Tyres	Drivers	1	2	3	4	5	6	7	8	9	10	11	12	13	14	15	16	17	18	T.C.	Points
2015	GP3/13; AER; **P**		CAT; FEA	CAT; SPR	RBR; FEA	RBR; SPR	SIL; FEA	SIL; SPR	HUN; FEA	HUN; SPR	SPA; FEA	SPA; SPR	MNZ; FEA	MNZ; SPR	SOC; FEA	SOC; SPR	BHR; FEA	BHR; SPR	YMC; FEA	YMC; SPR	7th	51
2015	GP3/13; AER; **P**	(Kuwait) Zaid Ashkanani	11	15	18	14	21	22	20	16	14	18	13	15	20	19	17	13	19	21	7th	51
2015	GP3/13; AER; **P**	(Spain) Álex Palou	12	20	14	Ret	Ret	13	19	18	7	5	7	10	4	9	Ret	10	8	1	7th	51
2015	GP3/13; AER; **P**	(Venezuela) Samin Gómez	20	19	Ret	16			21	Ret											7th	51
2015	GP3/13; AER; **P**	(Austria) Christopher Höher					23	24													7th	51
2015	GP3/13; AER; **P**	(France) Brandon Maïsano											12	13							7th	51
2015	GP3/13; AER; **P**	(Russia) Konstantin Tereshchenko													17	16	18	17	Ret	20	7th	51
2016	GP3/16; Mecachrome; **P**		CAT; FEA	CAT; SPR	RBR; FEA	RBR; SPR	SIL; FEA	SIL; SPR	HUN; FEA	HUN; SPR	HOC; FEA	HOC; SPR	SPA; FEA	SPA; SPR	MNZ; FEA	MNZ; SPR	SEP; FEA	SEP; SPR	YMC; FEA	YMC; SPR	7th	66
2016	GP3/16; Mecachrome; **P**	(Spain) Álex Palou	19	14	16	11	10	2	11	14	16	19^{†}	13	11	11	7	14	19	10	5	7th	66
2016	GP3/16; Mecachrome; **P**	(Netherlands) Steijn Schothorst	Ret	22	20	12	14	5	22	20	Ret	17	6	7	13	13	5	10	6	7	7th	66
2016	GP3/16; Mecachrome; **P**	(Russia) Konstantin Tereshchenko	17	21	18	Ret	20	13	16	17	Ret	15	17	Ret	17	14	17	17	8	6	7th	66
2017	GP3/16; Mecachrome; **P**		CAT; FEA	CAT; SPR	RBR; FEA	RBR; SPR	SIL; FEA	SIL; SPR	HUN; FEA	HUN; SPR	SPA; FEA	SPA; SPR	MNZ; FEA	MNZ; SPR	JER; FEA	JER; SPR	YMC; FEA	YMC; SPR			5th	56
2017	GP3/16; Mecachrome; **P**	(France) Julien Falchero	11	10	15	11	10	Ret	13	Ret	8	5	8	C	10	9	DNS	16			5th	56
2017	GP3/16; Mecachrome; **P**	(South Africa) Raoul Hyman	8	7	8	1	16	11	14	7	14	10	11	C	19	15	13	11			5th	56
2017	GP3/16; Mecachrome; **P**	(Argentina) Marcos Siebert	10	16	12	10	12	10	11	9	Ret	Ret	4	C	18	17	Ret	Ret			5th	56
2018	GP3/16; Mecachrome; **P**		CAT; FEA	CAT; SPR	LEC; FEA	LEC; SPR	RBR; FEA	RBR; SPR	SIL; FEA	SIL; SPR	HUN; FEA	HUN; SPR	SPA; FEA	SPA; SPR	MNZ; FEA	MNZ; SPR	SOC; FEA	SOC; SPR	YMC; FEA	YMC; SPR	3rd	193
2018	GP3/16; Mecachrome; **P**	(Italy) Leonardo Pulcini	**4**	9	4	8	2	3	6	6	2	4	15	Ret	14	7	**1**	8	1	12	3rd	193
2018	GP3/16; Mecachrome; **P**	(Finland) Simo Laaksonen	15	8	13	11	9	15	13	16	14	11	12	13	4	8	6	14	9	3	3rd	193
2018	GP3/16; Mecachrome; **P**	(Mexico) Diego Menchaca	10	12	14	Ret	14	16	12	11	9	10	19	16	Ret	14	Ret	15	18	16	3rd	193

== Timeline ==
Current series
FIA Formula 2 Championship	2017–present
FIA Formula 3 Championship	2019–present
F4 Spanish Championship	2021–present
Eurocup-3	2023–present
Formula Winter Series	2023–present
F1 Academy	2023–present
Le Mans Cup	2026–present
Former series
World Series by Nissan	1998–2003
Spanish Formula Three Championship	2004–2008
GP2 Series	2005–2008, 2014–2016
GP2 Asia Series	2008–2009
A1 Grand Prix	2008–2009
Euroformula Open Championship	2009, 2012–2018
Superstars Series	2011
Auto GP	2011–2012
European Touring Car Cup	2013–2014
World Touring Car Championship	2013–2017
Formula E	2014–2019
TCR Asia Series	2015
TCR International Series	2015
GP3 Series	2015–2018
World Touring Car Cup	2018

== See also ==
- Campos Meta 1

== Footnotes ==
Achievements
Preceded by none	Open Fortuna by Nissan Teams' Champion; 1998-2000	Succeeded by Vergani Racing
Preceded by iSport International	GP2 Series Teams' Champion; 2008	Succeeded by ART Grand Prix
Preceded by Escuderia TEC-Auto	Spanish Formula Three Teams' Champion; 2008, 2015-2016	Succeeded by Incumbent
Preceded by none	European F3 Open Teams' Champion; 2008	Succeeded by Cedars Motorsport
Preceded by RP Motorsport	Euroformula Open Teams' Champion; 2016	Succeeded by Incumbent
