= Antonio García (racing driver) =

Spanish racing driver (born 1980)

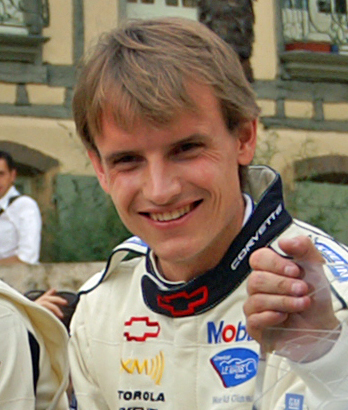
- García in the 2009 24 Hours of Le Mans drivers parade
- Nationality: (Spain) Spanish
- Born: Antonio García Navarro; 5 June 1980 (age 46) Madrid, Spain
- Categorisation: FIA Platinum

24 Hours of Le Mans career
- Years: 2006–2019
- Teams: Russian Age Racing, Team Modena, Aston Martin Racing, Corvette Racing
- Best finish: 9th (2006)
- Class wins: 3 (2008, 2009, 2011)

Antonio García Navarro (born June 5, 1980) is a Spanish professional racing driver. He has three class wins in the 24 Hours of Le Mans, winning GT1 with Aston Martin Racing in 2008 and with Corvette Racing in 2009 (GT1) and 2011 (GTE-Pro). He also has two class wins in the 24 Hours of Daytona in 2015 and 2021 and one overall in 2009. García won the IMSA SportsCar Championship five times, four in GTLM and one in GTD, as well as the 2013 American Le Mans Series in the GT class.

== Single-seater career ==
After a childhood in karting, Madrid-born García began racing cars in Formula Renault Campus in 1997. In 1998, he moved to the new Open Fortuna by Nissan series. The series changed its name to World Series by Nissan in 1999 and in 2000, García was the series champion with Campos Motorsport. This success saw García have a part-time opportunity to race in International Formula 3000 in 2001 and make his sports car debut in the FIA GT Championship. In 2002, he returned full-time to World Series by Nissan, was a test driver for Minardi, and finished 12th in FIA GT. In 2003, he moved full-time to the European Touring Car Championship driving a Ravaglia Motorsport BMW to eighth place in points. He improved to seventh place with the same team in 2004. The series became the World Touring Car Championship in 2005 and he finished ninth in points.

In December 2014, it was announced that García would drive for China Racing in the 2014 Punta del Este ePrix in Uruguay, the third round of the 2014–15 Formula E season. He replaced Ho-Pin Tung who participated in the Abu Dhabi Gulf 12-hour race.

== Sportscar career ==
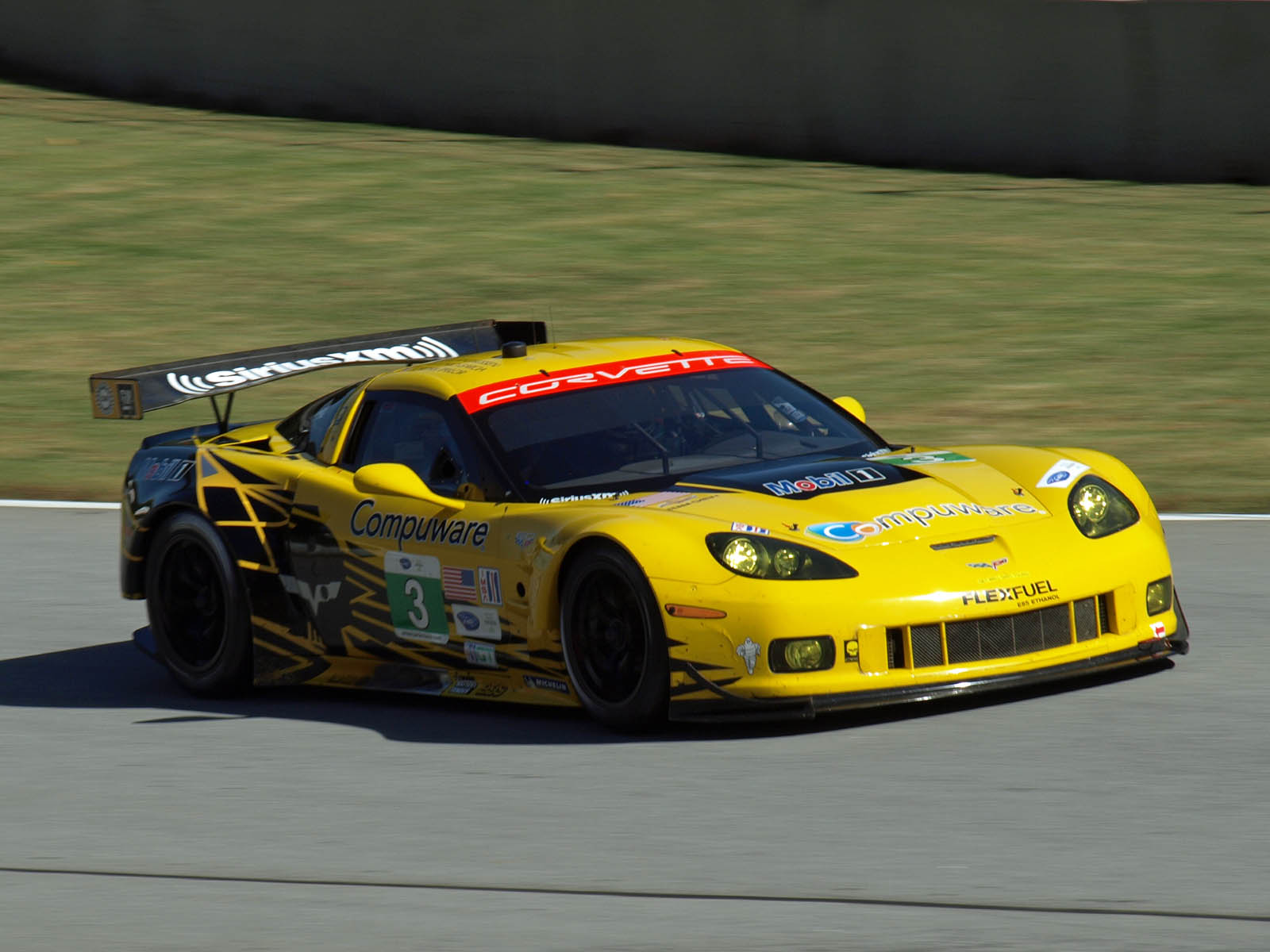
García driving for Corvette Racing in the 2012 Petit Le Mans.

García made his 24 Hours of Le Mans debut in 2006 but did not participate in any racing full-time. He returned to full-time action in 2007 competing in the Le Mans Series in the Team Modena Aston Martin DBR9, finishing sixth in points. García signed on with the Cheever Racing team in the Rolex Sports Car Series in 2008, but the team struggled with their new Coyote/Fabcar and García only finished 21st in points. He also participated in the 24 Hours of Le Mans in the factory Aston Martin Racing DBR9 which won the GT1 class. García drove for Brumos Racing in the 2009 24 Hours of Daytona, winning with teammates David Donohue, Darren Law, and Buddy Rice. He signed on with Corvette Racing to compete in the full season of the American Le Mans Series starting in 2009.

Beginning in 2012, García competed in some Rolex Sports Car Series events with Spirit of Daytona Racing.

García is a good friend of Formula One champion Fernando Alonso from their days together in karting. Alonso attended the 2009 24 Hours of Le Mans as a guest of García.

== Racing record ==
=== Career summary ===
Season	Series	Team	Races	Wins	Poles	F/Laps	Podiums	Points	Position
1997	Formula Renault Campus France		11	3	0	0	6	?	**3rd**
1998	Euro Open by Nissan	Campos Motorsport	12	2	0	1	4	99	5th
1999	Euro Open by Nissan	Campos Motorsport	15	1	1	1	4	109	6th
2000	Open Telefonica by Nissan	Campos Motorsport	16	4	5	6	10	199	**1st**
2001	International Formula 3000	Red Bull Junior Team F3000	4	0	0	0	0	0	26th
2001	International Formula 3000	Durango Formula	3	0	0	0	0	0	26th
2001	FIA GT Championship - N-GT	RWS Motorsport	3	1	0	0	1	24	13th
2002	World Series by Nissan	Campos Motorsport	15	0	0	0	2	82	5th
2002	FIA GT Championship - N-GT	RWS Motorsport	6	0	2	0	3	18	13th
2002	Formula One	Minardi	Test driver						
2003	European Touring Car Championship	BMW Team Italy-Spain	17	0	1	1	4	46	8th
2003	World Series by Nissan	Campos Motorsport	2	0	0	0	0	6	21st
2004	European Touring Car Championship	BMW Team Italy-Spain	19	0	0	0	3	43	7th
2005	World Touring Car Championship	BMW Team Italy-Spain	19	0	0	0	3	51	9th
2005	FIA GT Championship - GT1	Russian Age Racing	1	1	0	0	1	10	16th
2006	Le Mans Series - GT1	Team Modena	2	1	1	0	2	16	11th
2006	Le Mans Series - GT1	Cirtek Motorsport	2	0	0	0	1	13	17th
2006	24 Hours of Le Mans - GT1	Russian Age Racing/Team Modena	1	0	0	0	0	N/A	4th
2007	Le Mans Series - GT1	Team Modena	4	0	0	0	1	22	9th
2007	American Le Mans Series - GT1	Team Modena	1	0	0	0	1	19	10th
2007	24 Hours of Le Mans - GT1	Team Modena	1	0	0	0	0	N/A	10th
2008	Rolex Sports Car Series	Cheever Racing	13	0	0	0	1	224	21st
2008	Le Mans Series - GT1	Team Modena	4	3	1	3	4	36	**2nd**
2008	American Le Mans Series - GT1	Bell Motorsports	1	0	0	0	1	23	6th
2008	24 Hours of Le Mans - GT1	Aston Martin Racing	1	1	0	0	1	N/A	**1st**
2009	Rolex Sports Car Series	Brumos Racing	6	1	0	1	1	95	28th
2009	Le Mans Series - GT2	Team Modena	5	1	0	0	2	24	**3rd**
2009	FIA GT Championship - GT2	CRS Racing	2	0	0	0	1	8	16th
2009	American Le Mans Series - GT2	Corvette Racing	1	0	0	0	0	16	24th
2009	24 Hours of Le Mans - GT1	Corvette Racing	1	1	0	0	1	N/A	**1st**
2009	24 Hours of Daytona	Brumos Racing	1	1	?	?	1	N/A	**1st**
2010	Rolex Sports Car Series	Spirit of Daytona Racing	12	0	0	0	1	286	16th
2010	American Le Mans Series - GT2	Corvette Racing	2	0	0	0	0	29	19th
2010	24 Hours of Le Mans - GT2	Corvette Racing	1	0	0	0	0	N/A	NC
2011	Rolex Sports Car Series	Spirit of Daytona Racing	12	0	1	1	0	263	7th
2011	American Le Mans Series - GT	Corvette Racing	2	0	0	0	1	0	NC
2011	24 Hours of Le Mans - GTE Pro	Corvette Racing	1	1	0	0	1	N/A	**1st**
2012	Rolex Sports Car Series	Spirit of Daytona Racing	9	2	0	0	3	200	13th
2012	American Le Mans Series - GT	Corvette Racing	10	0	0	1	5	121	**3rd**
2012	24 Hours of Le Mans - GTE Pro	Corvette Racing	1	0	0	0	0	N/A	5th
2013	Rolex Sports Car Series	Spirit of Daytona Racing	2	0	0	0	0	48	28th
2013	Rolex Sports Car Series - GT	Stevenson Motorsports	1	0	0	0	0	25	53rd
2013	American Le Mans Series - GT	Corvette Racing	10	3	0	0	6	135	**1st**
2013	24 Hours of Le Mans - GTE Pro	Corvette Racing	1	0	0	0	0	N/A	4th
2014	United SportsCar Championship - GTLM	Corvette Racing	11	4	1	0	4	317	**3rd**
2014	24 Hours of Le Mans - GTE Pro	Corvette Racing	1	0	0	0	1	N/A	**2nd**
2014-15	Formula E	China Racing Formula E Team	1	0	0	0	0	0	28th
2014-15	Formula E	NEXTEV TCR Formula E Team	1	0	0	0	0	0	28th
2015	United SportsCar Championship - GTLM	Corvette Racing	10	3	0	1	5	295	**3rd**
2016	IMSA SportsCar Championship - GTLM	Corvette Racing	11	1	1	1	5	319	**3rd**
2016	24 Hours of Le Mans - GTE Pro	Corvette Racing	1	0	0	0	0	N/A	7th
2016	Blancpain GT Series Endurance Cup	Audi Sport Team WRT	3	0	0	0	0	12	30th
2017	IMSA SportsCar Championship - GTLM	Corvette Racing	11	3	0	1	5	334	**1st**
2017	24 Hours of Le Mans - GTE Pro	Corvette Racing	1	0	0	0	1	N/A	**3rd**
2017	Blancpain GT Series Endurance Cup	Audi Sport Team WRT	2	0	0	0	1	12	10th
2017	Intercontinental GT Challenge	Audi Sport Team WRT	1	0	0	0	0	8	12th
2018	IMSA SportsCar Championship - GTLM	Corvette Racing	11	0	1	1	8	322	**1st**
2018	24 Hours of Le Mans - GTE Pro	Corvette Racing	1	0	0	0	0	N/A	4th
2019	IMSA SportsCar Championship - GTLM	Corvette Racing	11	0	1	1	6	317	**3rd**
2019	24 Hours of Le Mans - GTE Pro	Corvette Racing	1	0	0	0	0	N/A	8th
2020	IMSA SportsCar Championship - GTLM	Corvette Racing	11	5	2	3	8	351	**1st**
2021	IMSA SportsCar Championship - GTLM	Corvette Racing	11	4	2	1	9	3549	**1st**
2021	24 Hours of Le Mans - GTE Pro	Corvette Racing	1	0	0	0	1	N/A	**2nd**
2022	IMSA SportsCar Championship - GTD Pro	Corvette Racing	10	1	1	2	5	3194	**3rd**
2022	24 Hours of Le Mans - GTE Pro	Corvette Racing	1	0	0	0	0	N/A	DNF
2023	IMSA SportsCar Championship - GTD Pro	Corvette Racing	11	2	1	1	6	3579	**3rd**
2024	IMSA SportsCar Championship - GTD Pro	Corvette Racing by Pratt Miller Motorsports	10	1	2	2	3	2934	**3rd**
2025	IMSA SportsCar Championship - GTD Pro	Corvette Racing by Pratt Miller Motorsports	10	1	0	1	6	3265	**1st**
2026	IMSA SportsCar Championship - GTD Pro	Corvette Racing by Pratt Miller Motorsports	10	1	2	1	1	2776	8th

=== Complete International Formula 3000 results ===
(key)

Year	Entrant	1	2	3	4	5	6	7	8	9	10	11	12	DC	Points
2001	Red Bull Junior Team F3000	INT; Ret	IMO; 16	CAT; 10	A1R; Ret	MON	NÜR	MAG	SIL	HOC				26th	0
2001	Durango Formula										HUN; 10	SPA; 16	MNZ; 11	26th	0

=== Complete European Touring Car Championship results ===
(key) (Races in bold indicate pole position) (Races in italics indicate fastest lap)

Year	Team	Car	1	2	3	4	5	6	7	8	9	10	11	12	13	14	15	16	17	18	19	20	DC	Pts
2003	BMW Team Italy-Spain	BMW 320i	VAL; 1; 3	VAL; 2; 7	MAG; 1; 14	MAG; 2; 8	PER; 1; 9	PER; 2; 7	**BRN**; **1**; 2	BRN; 2; 7	DON; 1 Ret	DON; 2 DNS	SPA; 1; 17†	SPA; 2; 12	AND; 1; 2	AND; 2; 5	OSC; 1; 4	OSC; 2; 2	EST; 1; 19†	EST; 2 DNS	MNZ; 1 Ret	MNZ; 2 DNS	8th	46
2004	BMW Team Italy-Spain	BMW 320i	MNZ; 1; 12	MNZ; 2; 6	VAL; 1; 7	VAL; 2; 15	MAG; 1; 4	MAG; 2 Ret	HOC; 1; 6	HOC; 2; 2	BRN; 1; 3	BRN; 2; 6	DON; 1; 10	DON; 2; 5	SPA; 1; 6	SPA; 2; 3	IMO; 1; 9	IMO; 2 Ret	OSC; 1; 9	OSC; 2 Ret	DUB; 1; 9	DUB; 2 DNS	7th	43

=== Complete World Touring Car Championship results ===
(key)

Year	Team	Car	1	2	3	4	5	6	7	8	9	10	11	12	13	14	15	16	17	18	19	20	DC	Points
2005	BMW Team-Italy Spain	BMW 320i	ITA; 1; 5	ITA; 2; 3	FRA; 1; 5	FRA; 2; 4	GBR; 1; 15	GBR; 2 Ret	SMR; 1; 2	SMR; 2; 9	MEX; 1; 5	MEX; 2; 2	BEL; 1; 6	BEL; 2; 8	GER; 1; 14	GER; 2; 9	TUR; 1; 4	TUR; 2 Ret	ESP; 1; 14	ESP; 2; 6	MAC; 1; 9	MAC; 2 DNS	9th	51

=== Complete 24 Hours of Le Mans results ===
Year	Team	Co-Drivers	Car	Class	Laps	Pos.	Class Pos.
2006	(Russia) Russian Age Racing (United Kingdom) Team Modena	(Australia) David Brabham (Brazil) Nelson Piquet Jr.	Aston Martin DBR9	GT1	343	9th	4th
2007	(United Kingdom) Team Modena	(Netherlands) Jos Menten (Brazil) Christian Fittipaldi	Aston Martin DBR9	GT1	318	17th	10th
2008	(United Kingdom) Aston Martin Racing	(Australia) David Brabham (United Kingdom) Darren Turner	Aston Martin DBR9	GT1	344	13th	**1st**
2009	(United States) Corvette Racing	(United States) Johnny O'Connell (Denmark) Jan Magnussen	Chevrolet Corvette C6.R	GT1	342	15th	**1st**
2010	(United States) Corvette Racing	(United States) Johnny O'Connell (Denmark) Jan Magnussen	Chevrolet Corvette C6.R	GT2	225	DNF	DNF
2011	(United States) Corvette Racing	(Monaco) Olivier Beretta (United States) Tommy Milner	Chevrolet Corvette C6.R	GTE; Pro	314	11th	**1st**
2012	(United States) Corvette Racing	(Denmark) Jan Magnussen (United States) Jordan Taylor	Chevrolet Corvette C6.R	GTE; Pro	326	23rd	5th
2013	(United States) Corvette Racing	(Denmark) Jan Magnussen (United States) Jordan Taylor	Chevrolet Corvette C6.R	GTE; Pro	312	19th	4th
2014	(United States) Corvette Racing	(Denmark) Jan Magnussen (United States) Jordan Taylor	Chevrolet Corvette C7.R	GTE; Pro	338	14th	**2nd**
2015	(United States) Corvette Racing	(Denmark) Jan Magnussen (Australia) Ryan Briscoe	Chevrolet Corvette C7.R	GTE; Pro	-	DNS	DNS
2016	(United States) Corvette Racing – GM	(Denmark) Jan Magnussen (United States) Ricky Taylor	Chevrolet Corvette C7.R	GTE; Pro	336	25th	7th
2017	(United States) Corvette Racing – GM	(Denmark) Jan Magnussen (United States) Jordan Taylor	Chevrolet Corvette C7.R	GTE; Pro	340	19th	**3rd**
2018	(United States) Corvette Racing – GM	(Denmark) Jan Magnussen (Germany) Mike Rockenfeller	Chevrolet Corvette C7.R	GTE; Pro	342	18th	4th
2019	(United States) Corvette Racing	(Denmark) Jan Magnussen (Germany) Mike Rockenfeller	Chevrolet Corvette C7.R	GTE; Pro	337	28th	8th
2021	(United States) Corvette Racing	(Netherlands) Nicky Catsburg (United States) Jordan Taylor	Chevrolet Corvette C8.R	GTE; Pro	345	21st	**2nd**
2022	(United States) Corvette Racing	(Netherlands) Nicky Catsburg (United States) Jordan Taylor	Chevrolet Corvette C8.R	GTE; Pro	214	DNF	DNF

=== 24 Hours of Daytona results ===
Year	Team	Co-drivers	Car	Class	Laps	Pos.	Class Pos.
2008	(United States) Cheever Racing	(Italy) Matteo Bobbi (France) Stéphane Ortelli (Italy) Fabio Babini	Coyote CC/08-Pontiac	DP	170	DNF	DNF
2009	(United States) Brumos Racing	(United States) Darren Law (United States) David Donohue (United States) Buddy Rice	Riley Mk. XI-Porsche	DP	735	**1st**	**1st**
2010	(United States) Spirit of Daytona Racing	(United Kingdom) Darren Manning (United States) Paul Menard (United States) Buddy Rice	Coyote CC/09-Porsche	DP	346	DNF	DNF
2011	(United States) Spirit of Daytona Racing	(United States) Paul Edwards (Germany) Sascha Maassen	Coyote CC/09-Chevrolet	DP	649	DNF	DNF
2012	(United States) Spirit of Daytona Racing	(United Kingdom) Oliver Gavin (Denmark) Jan Magnussen (United Kingdom) Richard Westbrook	Coyote Corvette DP	DP	746	8th	8th
2013	(United States) Spirit of Daytona Racing	(United Kingdom) Oliver Gavin (United States) Ricky Taylor (United Kingdom) Richard Westbrook	Coyote Corvette DP	DP	697	5th	5th
2014	(United States) Corvette Racing	(Denmark) Jan Magnussen (Australia) Ryan Briscoe	Chevrolet Corvette C7.R	GTLM	329	DNF	DNF
2015	(United States) Corvette Racing	(Denmark) Jan Magnussen (Australia) Ryan Briscoe	Chevrolet Corvette C7.R	GTLM	725	4th	1st
2016	(United States) Corvette Racing	(Denmark) Jan Magnussen (Germany) Mike Rockenfeller	Chevrolet Corvette C7.R	GTLM	722	8th	2nd
2017	(United States) Corvette Racing	(Denmark) Jan Magnussen (Germany) Mike Rockenfeller	Chevrolet Corvette C7.R	GTLM	652	8th	4th
2018	(United States) Corvette Racing	(Denmark) Jan Magnussen (Germany) Mike Rockenfeller	Chevrolet Corvette C7.R	GTLM	781	13th	3rd
2019	(United States) Corvette Racing	(Denmark) Jan Magnussen (Germany) Mike Rockenfeller	Chevrolet Corvette C7.R	GTLM	563	16th	6th
2020	(United States) Corvette Racing	(Netherlands) Nicky Catsburg (United States) Jordan Taylor	Chevrolet Corvette C8.R	GTLM	785	16th	4th
2021	(United States) Corvette Racing	(Netherlands) Nicky Catsburg (United States) Jordan Taylor	Chevrolet Corvette C8.R	GTLM	770	11th	1st
2022	(United States) Corvette Racing	(Netherlands) Nicky Catsburg (United States) Jordan Taylor	Chevrolet Corvette C8.R GTD	GTD Pro	698	29th	6th
2023	(United States) Corvette Racing	(United States) Tommy Milner (United States) Jordan Taylor	Chevrolet Corvette C8.R GTD	GTD Pro	729	19th	2nd
2024	(United States) Corvette Racing by Pratt Miller Motorsports	(Spain) Daniel Juncadella (United Kingdom) Alexander Sims	Chevrolet Corvette Z06 GT3.R	GTD Pro	726	30th	5th
2025	(United States) Corvette Racing by Pratt Miller Motorsports	(Spain) Daniel Juncadella (United Kingdom) Alexander Sims	Chevrolet Corvette Z06 GT3.R	GTD Pro	723	17th	2nd

=== American Le Mans Series results ===
(key) (Races in bold indicate pole position; results in italics indicate fastest lap)

Year	Team	Class	Make	Engine	1	2	3	4	5	6	7	8	9	10	11	12	Pos.	Points	Ref
2007	Team Modena	GT1	Aston Martin DBR9	Aston Martin 6.0 L V12	SEB; 3	STP	LNB	TEX	UTA	LIM	MID	AME	MOS	DET	PET	MON	10th	19	
2008	Bell Motorsports	GT1	Aston Martin DBR9	Aston Martin 6.0 L V12	SEB; 3	STP	LBH	UTA	LRP	MDO	ELK	MOS	DET	PET	LAG		9th	23	
2009	Corvette Racing	GT1	Chevrolet Corvette C6.R	Chevrolet LS7.R 7.0 L V8	SEB; 1	STP	LBH	UTA	LRP								NC	-	
2009	Corvette Racing	GT2	Chevrolet Corvette C6.R	Chevrolet 6.0 L V8						MDO	ELK	MOS	PET; 6	LAG			36th	16	
2010	Corvette Racing	GT	Chevrolet Corvette C6.R	Chevrolet 5.5 L V8	SEB; 8	LBH	LAG	UTA	LRP	MDO	ELK	MOS	PET; 6				20th	29	
2011	Corvette Racing	GT	Chevrolet Corvette C6.R	Chevrolet 5.5 L V8	SEB; 3	LBH	LRP	MOS	MDO	ELK	BAL	LAG	PET; Ret				NC	0	
2012	Corvette Racing	GT	Chevrolet Corvette C6.R	Chevrolet 5.5 L V8	SEB; 2	LBH; 4	LAG; 2	LRP; 2	MOS; 2	MDO; 13	ELK; 6	BAL; 6	VIR; 8	PET; 2			3rd	121	
2013	Corvette Racing	GT	Chevrolet Corvette C6.R	Chevrolet 5.5 L V8	SEB; Ret	LBH; 5	LAG; 1	LRP; 2	MOS; 4	ELK; 2	BAL; 1	COA; 1	VIR; 3	PET; 6			1st	135	

=== Complete IMSA SportsCar Championship results ===
(key) (Races in bold indicate pole position) (Races in italics indicate fastest lap)

Year	Team	Class	Make	Engine	1	2	3	4	5	6	7	8	9	10	11	Pos.	Points	Ref
2014	Corvette Racing	GTLM	Chevrolet Corvette C7.R	Chevrolet 5.5L V8	DAY; 10	SEB; 8	LBH; 1	**LGA**; 1	WGL; 1	MOS; 1	IMS; 4	ELK; 6	VIR; 7	COA; 9	PET; 8	3rd	317	
2015	Corvette Racing	GTLM	Chevrolet Corvette C7.R	Chevrolet 5.5L V8	DAY; 1	SEB; 1	LBH; 3	LGA; 7	WGL; 4	MOS; 3	ELK; 4	VIR; 6	COA; 6	PET; 6		3rd	295	
2016	Corvette Racing	GTLM	Chevrolet Corvette C7.R	Chevrolet 5.5 L V8	DAY; 2	SEB; 9	LBH; 9	LGA; 4	WGL; 7	**MOS**; 3	LIM; 2	ELK; 6	VIR; 1	COA; 3	PET; 4	3rd	319	
2017	Corvette Racing	GTLM	Chevrolet Corvette C7.R	Chevrolet 5.5 L V8	DAY; 4	SEB; 1	LBH; 5	COA; 1	WGL; 3	MOS; 4	LIM; 4	ELK; 4	VIR; 1	LGA; 4	PET; 2	1st	334	
2018	Corvette Racing	GTLM	Chevrolet Corvette C7.R	Chevrolet LT5.5 5.5 L V8	**DAY**; 3	SEB; 8	LBH; 4	MDO; 3	WGL; 2	MOS; 2	**LIM**; 2	ELK; 3	VIR; 2	LGA; 3	PET; 8	1st	322	
2019	Corvette Racing	GTLM	Chevrolet Corvette C7.R	Chevrolet LT5.5 5.5 L V8	DAY; 6	SEB; 3	LBH; 2	MDO; 2	**WGL**; 2	MOS; 7	LIM; 5	ELK; 4	VIR; 3	LGA; 3	PET; 4	3rd	317	
2020	Corvette Racing	GTLM	Chevrolet Corvette C8.R	Chevrolet 5.5 L V8	DAY; 4	DAY; 1	**SEB**; 2	ELK; 1	VIR; 1	ATL; 5	**MDO**; 1	**CLT**; 1	**PET**; 2	**LGA**; 2	**SEB**; 5	1st	351	
2021	Corvette Racing	GTLM	Chevrolet Corvette C8.R	Chevrolet 5.5 L V8	DAY; 1	**SEB**; 4	DET; 2†	**WGL**; 1	**WGL**; 1	**LIM**; 1	**ELK**; 2	**LGA**; 2	**LBH**; 2	VIR; 2	PET; 6	1st	3549	
2022	Corvette Racing	GTD Pro	Chevrolet Corvette C8.R GTD	Chevrolet 5.5 L V8	DAY; 6	SEB; 1	**LBH**; 3	LGA; 4	WGL; 6	MOS; 2	LIM; 4	ELK; 3	VIR; 2	PET; 5		3rd	3194	
2023	Corvette Racing	GTD Pro	Chevrolet Corvette C8.R GTD	Chevrolet 5.5 L V8	DAY; 2	**SEB**; 5	LBH; 2	LGA; 4	WGL; 3	MOS; 1	LIM; 4	ELK; 3	VIR; 1	IMS; 5	PET; 7	3rd	3579	
2024	Corvette Racing by Pratt Miller Motorsports	GTD Pro	Chevrolet Corvette Z06 GT3.R	Chevrolet LT6 5.5 L V8	DAY; 5	SEB; 10	LGA; 5	**DET**; 10	WGL; 3	**MOS**; 1	ELK; 5	VIR; 9	IMS; 3	PET; 5		3rd	2934	
2025	Corvette Racing by Pratt Miller Motorsports	GTD Pro	Chevrolet Corvette Z06 GT3.R	Chevrolet LT6 5.5 L V8	DAY; 2	SEB; 7	LGA; 3	DET; 2	WGL; 2	MOS; 4	ELK; 4	VIR; 1	IMS; 4	PET; 3		1st	3265	
2026	Corvette Racing by Pratt Miller Motorsports	GTD Pro	Chevrolet Corvette Z06 GT3.R	Chevrolet LT6.R 5.5 L V8	**DAY**; 13	SEB; 4	LGA; 4	**DET**; 1	WGL; 4	MOS; 9	ELK; 10	VIR; 10	IMS; 4	PET; 8		8th	2776	

^{†} Non-points event.

=== Complete Formula E results ===
(key) (Races in bold indicate pole position; races in italics indicate fastest lap)

Year	Team	Chassis	Powertrain	1	2	3	4	5	6	7	8	9	10	11	Pos	Points
2014–15	China Racing / NEXTEV TCR	Spark SRT01-e	SRT01-e	BEI	PUT	PDE; 11	BUE	MIA	LBH	MCO	BER	MSC; 19	LDN	LDN	28th	0

Sporting positions
Preceded by Fernando Alonso	Open Telefónica by Nissan; Champion; 2000	Succeeded by Franck Montagny
Preceded by Michael Christensen; Patrick Long	North American Endurance Cup; GTLM Champion; 2015; With: Jan Magnussen	Succeeded by Oliver Gavin; Tommy Milner
Preceded by Oliver Gavin; Tommy Milner	IMSA SportsCar Championship; GTLM Champion; 2017-2018; With: Jan Magnussen	Succeeded by Earl Bamber; Laurens Vanthoor
Preceded by Earl Bamber; Laurens Vanthoor	IMSA SportsCar Championship; GTLM Champion; 2020-2021; With: Jordan Taylor	Succeeded by Matt Campbell; Mathieu Jaminet (GTD Pro)
Preceded by Laurin Heinrich	IMSA SportsCar Championship; GTD Pro Champion; 2025; With: Alexander Sims	Succeeded by Connor De Phillippi; Neil Verhagen
