= Laurent Delahaye =

French racing driver (born 1977)

Laurent Delahaye (born 6 January 1977) is a French former racing driver.
