= Ho =

Ho (or the transliterations He or Heo) may refer to:

== People ==
=== Language and ethnicity ===
- Ho people, an ethnic group of India
  - Ho language, a tribal language in India
- Hani people, or Ho people, an ethnic group in China, Laos and Vietnam
- Hiri Motu, ISO 639-1 language code ho
- Ho (Armenian letter), a letter of the Armenian script

=== Names ===
- Ho (Korean name), a family name and a given name
- Heo, also romanised as Hŏ, a Korean family name
- Ho (Korean: 호; Hanja: 號); the Korean term for an art name (or "pen name")
- Hồ (surname), a Vietnamese surname
- He (surname), or Ho, the romanised transliteration of several Chinese family names
- Hè (surname), also romanised as Ho, a Chinese surname

=== People with the surname ===
- Adrianne Ho, Canadian model, designer, and businesswoman
- Cassey Ho (born 1987), American social media fitness entrepreneur
- Christian Ho (born 2006), racing driver
- Coco Ho (born 1991), American surfer
- Dale Ho (born 1977), U.S. district judge for the Southern District of New York
- Derek Ho (1964—2020), Hawaiian surfer
- Don Ho (1930–2007), American musician
- Ho Chi Minh (1890–1969), Vietnamese political leader
- Martin Ho (born 1990), English football manager
- Michael Ho (born 1957), American surfer
- Sornsawan Ho (born 1993), Thai member of the Scout Movement

== Places ==
- Ho, Denmark
- Ho Municipal Assembly, a district in Ghana
  - Ho, Ghana
  - Ho Airport

== Science and technology ==
- Tasmanian Herbarium, Index herbariorum code HO
- ho-mobile, an Italian telecommunications company owned by Vodafone
- Holmium, symbol Ho, a chemical element
- Hoxnian (Ho I to Ho IV), a stage of the geological history of the British Isles
- Hydroxyl radical, ^{•}OH, chemical formula HO
- Heterotopic ossification, a process by which bone tissue forms outside of the skeleton
- Harmonic oscillator, an elementary physical model of a particle in a square potential
- Hypothalamic obesity

== Other uses ==
- Ho!, a 1968 French-Italian crime film
- Hō (EP), a 2001 EP by Maximum the Hormone
- Ho (kana), a part of the Japanese writing system
- Handelsorganisation, a state-owned retail business of the former German Democratic Republic
- HO scale, a rail transport modelling scale
- Antinea Airlines, a former Algerian airline, IATA airline code HO
- Juneyao Airlines, a Chinese airline, IATA airline code HO
- Slang for a whore or sexually loose persons

== See also ==
- Hoe (disambiguation)
- Hoo (disambiguation)
- Hou (disambiguation)
- Hồ (disambiguation)
- Hu, a Chinese surname
- Ho Hos, chocolate snack cakes
- Ho ho ho (disambiguation)
- H0 (disambiguation) (H zero)
