= Oh =

Oh, OH, or Oh! is an interjection, often proclaiming surprise, understanding or disappointment. It may refer to:

== Arts and entertainment ==
=== Music ===
==== Albums ====
- Oh! (Girls' Generation album), 2010
- Oh! (ScoLoHoFo album), 2003
- OH (Ohio), by Lambchop, 2008
- Oh!, an EP that came with the preorders of Oh! Gravity. by Switchfoot, 2006

==== Songs ====
- "O (Oh!)", 1920 by Ted Lewis, 1953 by Pee Wee Hunt
- "Oh" (Ciara song), 2005
- "Oh!" (Girls' Generation song), 2010
- "Oh!" (The Linda Lindas song), 2021
- "Oh!" (Pink Lady song), 1981
- "Oh" (Stray Kids song), 2021
- "Oh!", by Boys Noize from Oi Oi Oi
- "Oh!", by The Breeders from Pod
- "Oh", by Dave Matthews from Some Devil
- "Oh", by Fugazi from The Argument
- "Oh", by Juliana Hatfield from Made in China
- "Oh!", by Micky Green from White T-Shirt
- "Oh!", by Sleater-Kinney from One Beat
- "Oh", by Spratleys Japs from Pony
- "Oh!", by The Trudy
- "Oh," by Underworld, recorded for the soundtrack to A Life Less Ordinary, 1997

=== Other media ===
- Oh! (TV channel), an Australian cable TV channel owned by Optus Television
- Oxygen (TV channel), an American TV channel formerly called "Oh!"
- Oh, an alien and the main protagonist from the DreamWorks animated film Home
- Oh, I See, an Indonesian news magazine on Nusantara TV

== People ==
- Oh (surname), Korean surname romanized as "Oh" or "O"
- Oh (Japanese surname), Japanese surname derived from Wang(王)
- Ou (surname), Chinese and Cantonese surnames pronounced as "Oh" or "O"
- Dennis Oh, Korean actor
- Nadia Oh, English vocalist

== Science and technology ==
=== Chemistry ===
- OH, the hydroxy functional group
- OH^{−}, hydroxide anion
- ^{•}OH, hydroxyl radical
- OH, the alcohol class of compounds, which possess a hydroxy functional group

=== Other uses in science and technology ===
- Hominid fossils found at Olduvai Gorge (prefix "OH")
- OH, designation in the Unified Soil Classification System for organic-rich clay or silt of high plasticity
- O_{h}, the point group of octahedral molecular geometry
- Ohnesorge number, a dimensionless number that relates the viscous forces to inertial and surface tension forces

== Transportation ==
- OH, registration prefix for aircraft registered in Finland
- Comair (United States) (1977–2012, IATA airline code OH)
- PSA Airlines (1979–present, IATA airline code OH since 2012)
- Observation helicopter, in military abbreviation

== Other uses ==
- Ohio, US (postal abbreviation)
- O.H., post-nominal letters for the Brothers Hospitallers of Saint John of God
- Orphic Hymns
- OpenHarmony

== See also ==
- 0H (disambiguation) (zero H)
- H0 (disambiguation)
- Ho (disambiguation)
- O (disambiguation)
