= 胡 =

胡, may refer to:

== Names ==
- Hu (surname), Chinese surname.
- Hồ (surname), Vietnamese surname.
- Ho (Korean name), Korean surname.

== Other ==
- Hu (people), historical term for populations to the north and west of China proper.
- Xiongnu, Eurasian steppe confederation (3rd c. BC – 1st c. AD).
