= HH0 =

HH0, HH-0, HH 0, HH.0, may refer to:

- Ms. Midshipwoman Harrington (novella), abbreviated "HH0", the prequel novella to the Honor Harrington novel series, part of the Honorverse fictional milieu created by David Weber
- 01440 — Haverhill (HH0), Suffolk, England, UK; see List of dialling codes in the United Kingdom

== See also ==
- HHO (disambiguation)
- HH (disambiguation)
- H0 (disambiguation)
- H (disambiguation)
