= Hous =

Hous may be:

- a Middle English spelling of House
- an ISO 4 abbreviation of Housing
- the plural of Hou

== See also ==
- Hose (disambiguation)
- Haus (disambiguation)
