= HHO =

HHO may refer to:

- Croatian Helsinki Committee (Croatian: Hrvatski helsinški odbor)
- HHO gas, a fringe science term for oxyhydrogen with a 2:1 ratio of hydrogen and oxygen
- Home heating oil

== See also ==
- Herbig–Haro object (HH)
- HH0 (disambiguation)
