= Varde River =

Coordinates: 55.5795°N 8.3190°E

Varde
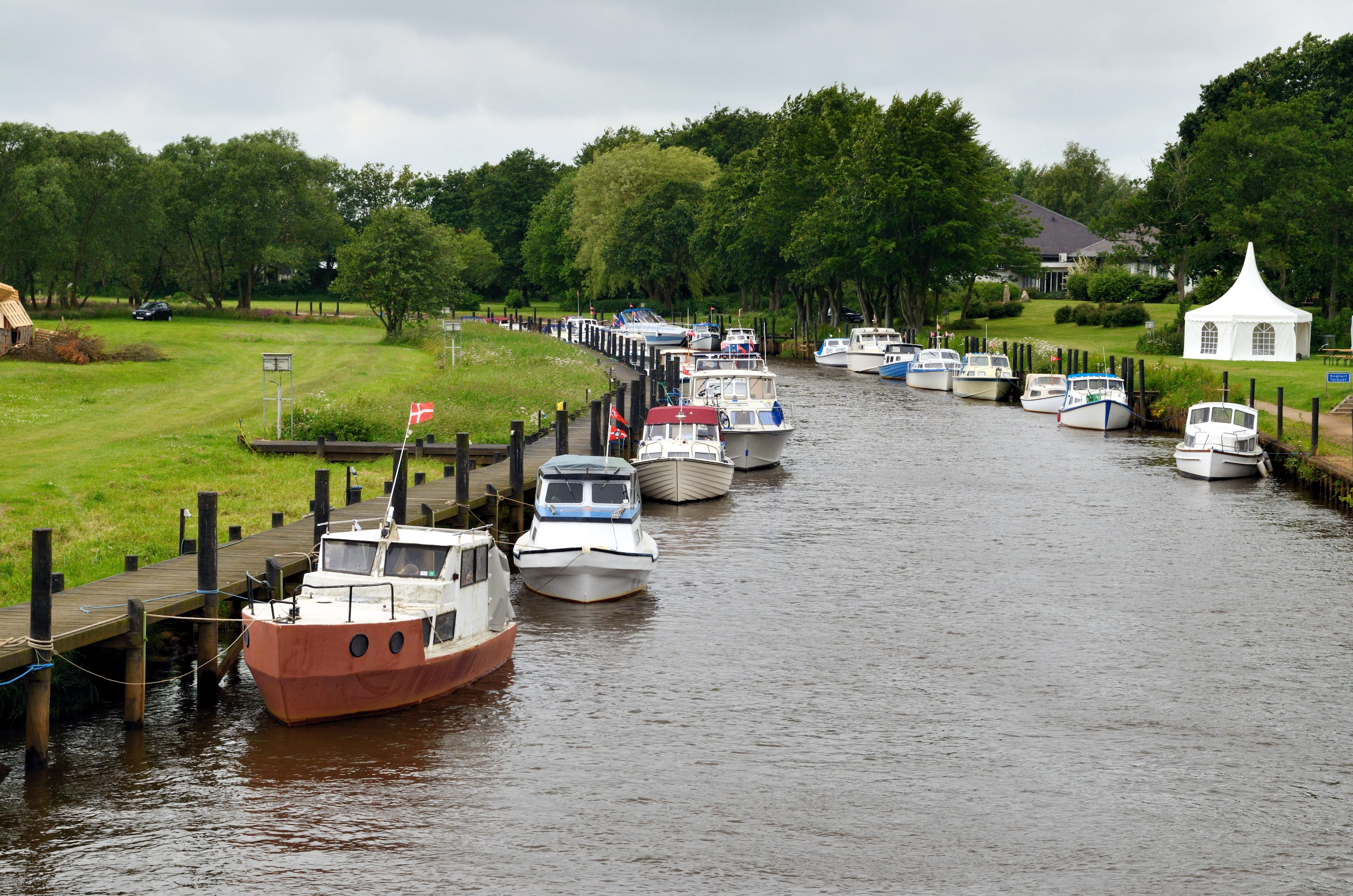
- Varde River in Varde

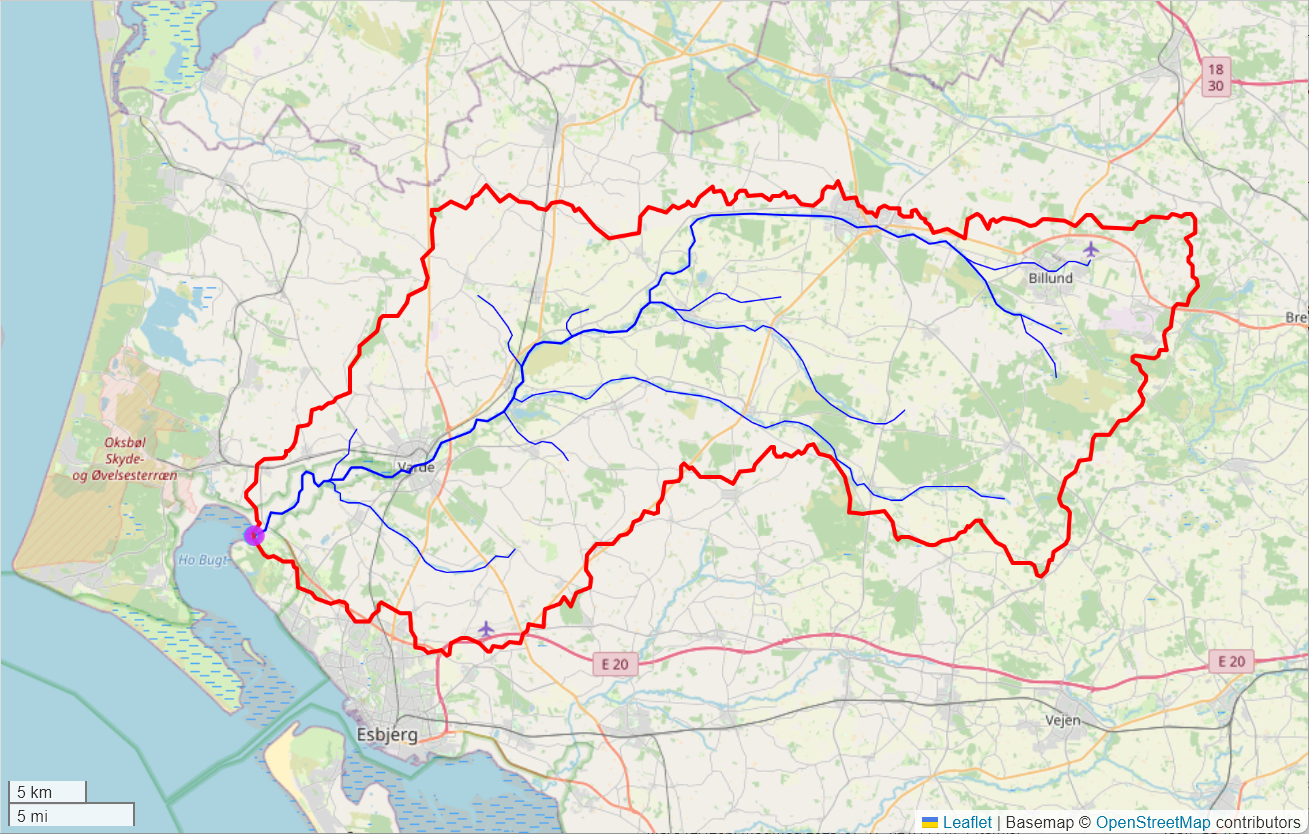
- Map of the Varde River watershed. Blue lines show the main rivers and streams, and the red line shows the basin boundary.
- Native name: Varde Å (Danish)

Location
- Country: Denmark
- Region: Jutland
- District: Southern Denmark Region
- Municipality: Varde, Esbjerg

Physical characteristics
- Mouth: Ho Bugt
- Length: 40 km (25 mi)
- Basin size: 1,088 km^{2} (420 sq mi)

The Varde (Danish: Varde Å) is a river of Jutland, Denmark. With a length of approximately 40 kilometres (25 mi), it is the third longest watercourse in Denmark, and has a catchment area of 1,088 square kilometres (420 sq mi). The river flows through the municipalities of Varde and Esbjerg, forming the boundary between them along parts of its course.

== Course ==
The Varde is formed by the confluence of the Grindsted and the Ansager. Approximately 300 metres (330 yd) downstream from that point, the majority of the river's flow was diverted by a weir into the Ansager Canal leading to a reservoir, Lake Karlsgårde, to be used for hydroelectric power generation at the Karlsgårde Hydroelectric Plant near Varde. Since 2006, the plant operator, Sydvest Energi, has given up its rights to dam and divert watercourses in the Varde drainage basin, and the river now flows past Hodde, bypassing the reservoir, which is now fed only by the Holme River. The plant is to be entirely closed down by the end of 2015.

In its lower reaches the river winds past the estate of Nørholm, and at Sig, past Sig Fiskeri, one of the largest fish farms in Denmark. The fish farm continues to draw water from the river, because the owner believes the groundwater contains too much iron oxide. The Holme then flows into the Varde, bringing with it the water from Lake Karlsgårde.

The river flows around the town of Varde and empties into the Ho Bugt bay north of Esbjerg.

The Varde is the only major tidal river in Denmark whose outlet is not regulated with dykes and sluice gates. As a result, the river remains under the influence of natural forces; for example, the tides in the bay affect both water level and flow rate far upriver, often as far as the outflow from Lake Karlsgårde.

=== Municipal boundaries ===
For part of its course the Varde makes up the boundary between Varde Municipality and Esbjerg Municipality.

=== Parish boundaries ===
For parts of its course the Varde makes up the boundary between the following parishes:

- Ansager and Skovlund
- Hodde and Thorstrup
- Thorstrup and Øse
- Thorstrup and Næsbjerg
- Varde and Næsbjerg
- Varde Sogn and Alslev
- Janderup and Alslev
- Janderup and Hostrup
- Billum and Hostrup

== History ==
The 15.5-kilometre (9.6 mi) long stretch of the Varde between the Ansager weir and the inflow from Lake Karlsgårde lost approximately 90% of its flow in 1945 when the Karlsgårde Hydroelectric Plant, originally constructed in the 1920s, was expanded with the construction of the Ansager Canal to draw water from the Varde as well as the Holme.

In the 1950s, the section of the river between Hessel and Nørholm was dredged and straightened. Originally 10 kilometres (6.2 mi) long, with 35 bends, this stretch was reduced in length to a straight channel 5–6 kilometres (3.1–3.7 mi) long with four concrete sections.

A large part of the straightening of the river has been reversed beginning in 2009 in a land restoration project supported by the Actions for Houting project of the European Union LIFE Programme.

The lower river valley, west of Varde, was previously under intensive cultivation, among other uses for the production of horse feed with EU support. Beginning in 1994–95, farmers have modified their practices, no longer using fertiliser and keeping vegetation cut, which it is hoped in association with the higher water table will restore habitat for birds, in particular the endangered corncrake. In 1997–2002 more than 250 voluntarily signed 20-year agreements under Operation Engsnarre (Operation Corncrake), also supported by the EU LIFE Programme.

== Aquatic life ==
The Varde River is home to many species of fish, including brown trout, grayling, pike and houting, and also salmon and sea trout, which attract many sport anglers. Fishing in the river is managed by the Grindsted Sportsfiskerforening (sport fishing association), Varde Sportsfiskerforening and Sydvestjydsk (Southwest Jutland) Sportsfiskerforening.

The river is also the only habitat in Denmark of the freshwater pearl mussel. The Varde River together with the lower reaches of the Ansager and the Grindsted has been designated an EU Special Area of Conservation. The designation also covers the majority of the existing lowlands in the river valley. In the designation, the houting and the freshwater pearl mussel were identified as priority species; especial weight is to be given to fulfilment of provisions relating to their habitat.

== Recreation ==
In addition to fishing, Varde Roklub uses the river for rowing between April and October on the stretch between the Karlsgårde Hydroelectric Plant and the Tarphage bridge near Billum. The club turned 75 in 2014.
