= Ho Bay =

Bay in Denmark

Coordinates: 55°34′0″N 8°16′24″E

Ho Bay (Danish: Ho Bugt) is a Danish bay with an approximate area of 50 square kilometres (19 sq mi). It constitutes the northern end of the Wadden Sea, and lies between Skallingen in the southwest, Ho in the west, Oksbøl to the north and Hjerting to the east. At the northeastern end, Varde Å has its outlet through Tarp and Billum Enge, north of Marbæk Plantage.

In the southern end of the bay lies the island Langli surrounded by large sandy surfaces, but with a road to the north to the peninsula Nyeng, south of Ho.

As a part of the Wadden Sea, Ho Bay is an international nature conservation area under the Natura 2000 network, and Ramsar area, Special Area of Conservation and Special Protection Area.

The name goes back to circa 1325 when it was Hoo that comes from the old Danish word trug. The property was early among the most inhabited areas in West Jutland, when the bay provided shelter for both freight and fishing boats.

In 1941, there were big plans for land reclamation in Ho Bugt, where in a collaboration between Hedeselskabet and The Land Winding-up Committee would regulate Varde Å, make Langli landfast, and recover an area of 1,550 hectares (3,800 acres). However, the project was shelved when one feared a sanding of sailing into Esbjerg.

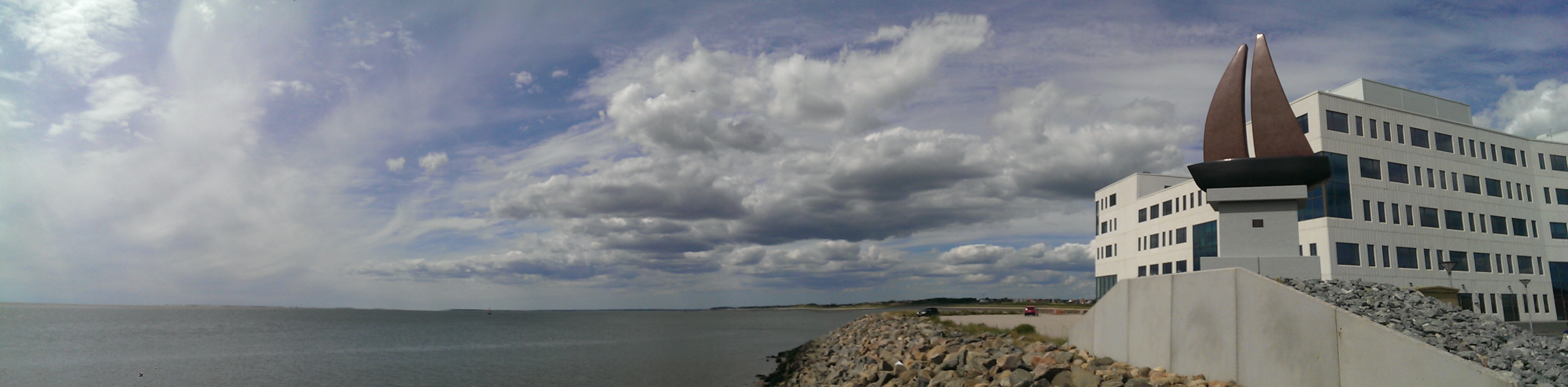
Ho Bay seen from Esbjerg
