= 2024 Eurocup-3 season =

2024 formula racing championship

The 2024 Eurocup-3 season was the second season of the Eurocup-3 series. Eurocup-3 is a multi-event motor racing championship for single-seater open wheel formula racing cars held across Europe. The championship was created in 2023 as an alternative to the FIA-sanctioned Formula Regional European Championship and the Euroformula Open championship, after the latter series struggled to attract entries in late 2022.

Rookie Christian Ho, driving for Campos Racing, won the Drivers' Championship by five points over MP Motorsport's Javier Sagrera, following a lengthy appeal process that lasted three months. Sagrera's team MP Motorsport won their first Teams' Championship at the penultimate round of the season.

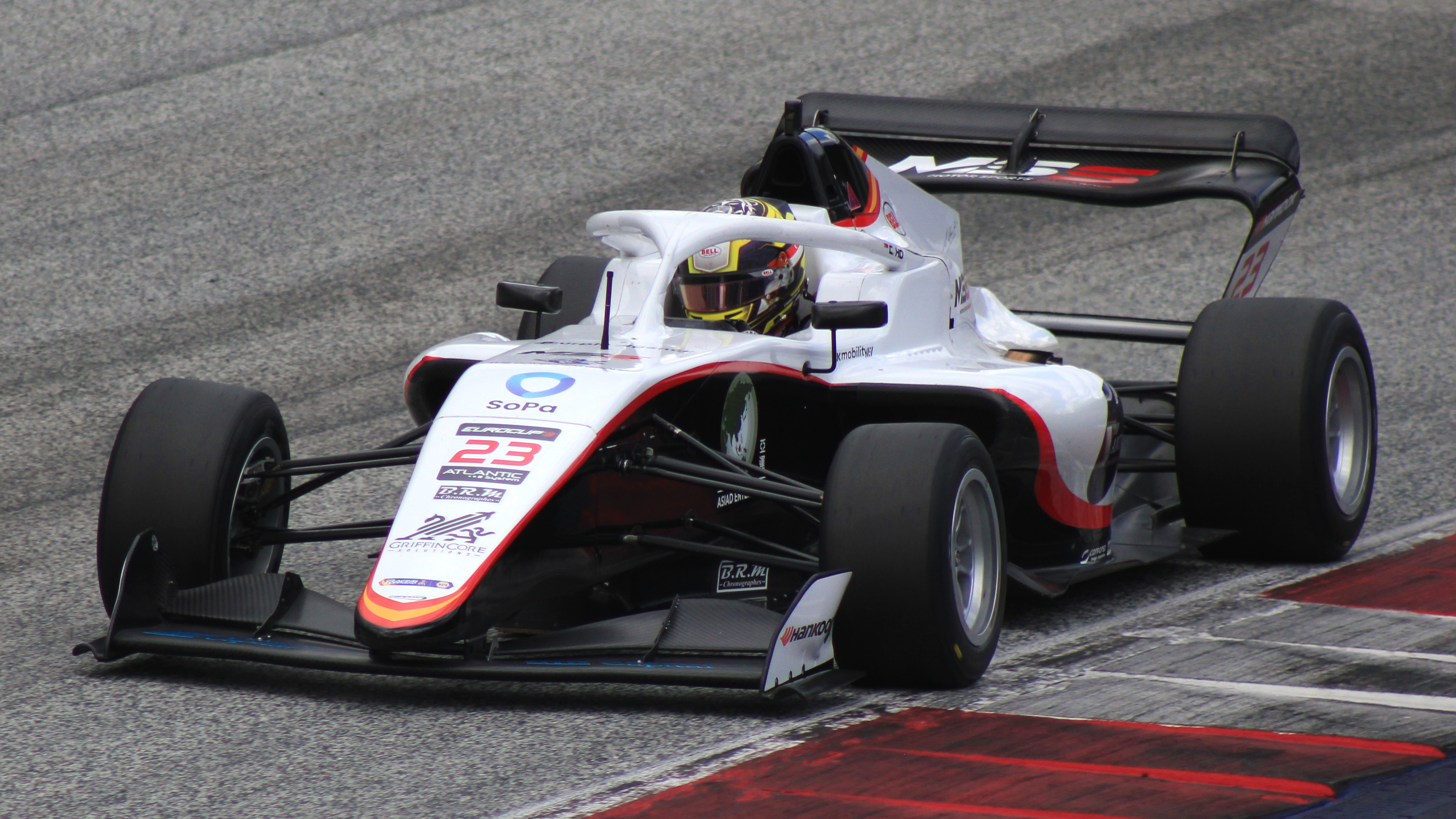
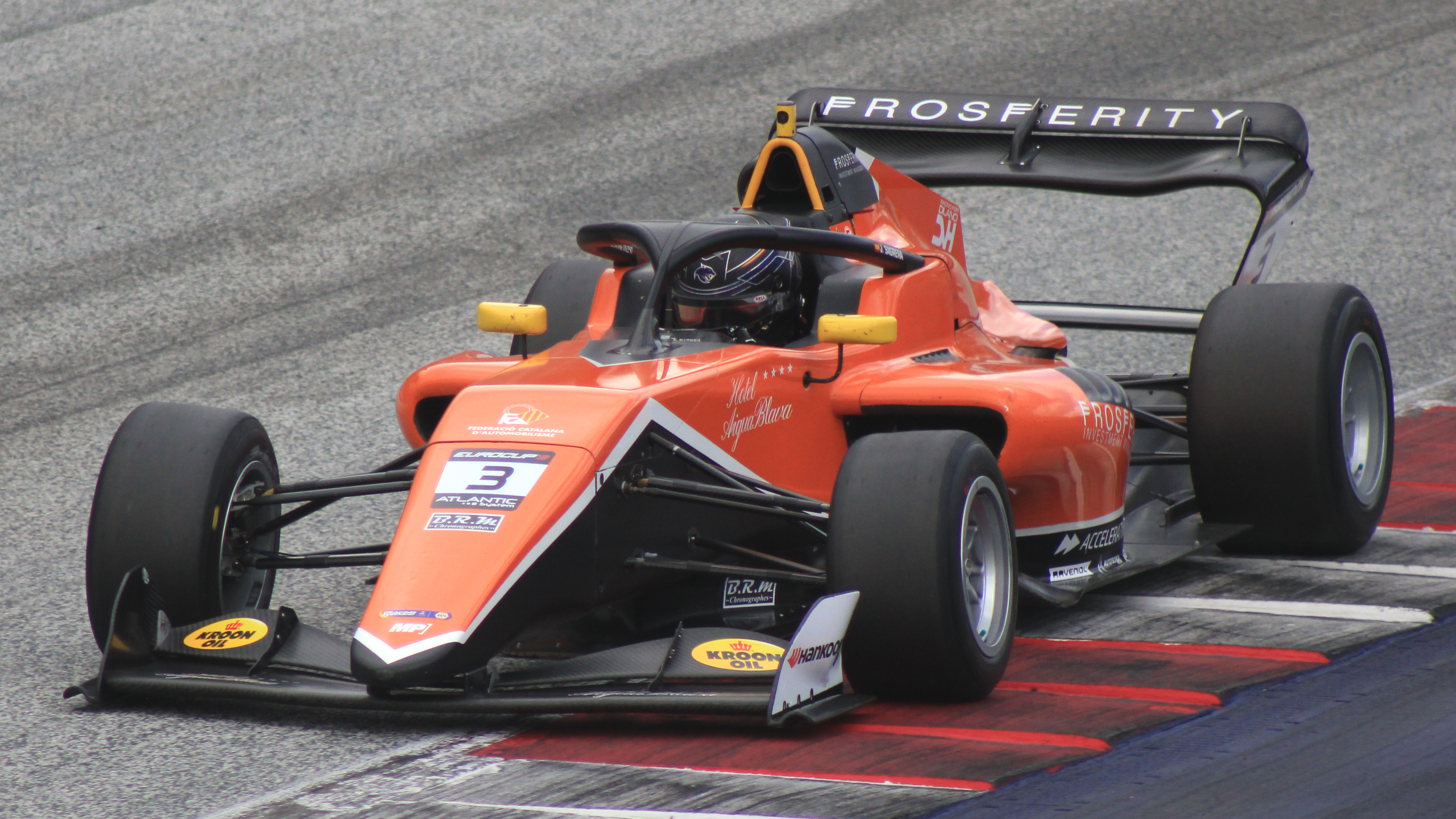
Christian Ho (top), driving for Campos Racing, won both the Drivers' and Rookies' Championship. Javier Sagrera (bottom), driving for Teams' Champions MP Motorsport, was runner-up.

== Teams and drivers ==
Teams utilized the same Tatuus F3 T-318 chassis used in the Formula Regional European Championship, but fitted with an updated body kit, a new intercooler and a battery kit. It also was 25 kg lighter than the FRECA car. The car used a 270 hp Alfa Romeo-Autotecnica engine, and Hankook tires.

| Team | No. | Driver | Status | Rounds |
|---|---|---|---|---|
| (Spain) Campos Racing | 2 | (Australia) Noah Lisle | | NC, All |
| (Spain) Campos Racing | 5 | (Germany) Valentin Kluss | R | NC, All |
| (Spain) Campos Racing | 16 | (South Korea) Michael Shin | | NC, All |
| (Spain) Campos Racing | 23 | (Singapore) Christian Ho | R | NC, All |
| (Spain) Campos Racing | 52 | (Morocco) Suleiman Zanfari | | NC, 1–3 |
| (Spain) Campos Racing | 52 | (Mexico) Jesse Carrasquedo Jr. | | 4–8 |
| (Netherlands) MP Motorsport | 3 | (Spain) Javier Sagrera | | All |
| (Netherlands) MP Motorsport | 25 | (Spain) Javier Sagrera | | NC |
| (Netherlands) MP Motorsport | 6 | (Spain) Bruno del Pino | | All |
| (Netherlands) MP Motorsport | 24 | (Brazil) Emerson Fittipaldi Jr. | | NC, All |
| (Netherlands) MP Motorsport | 26 | (Vietnam) Owen Tangavelou | | NC |
| (Netherlands) MP Motorsport | 84 | (Vietnam) Owen Tangavelou | | All |
| (Netherlands) MP Motorsport | 34 | (Switzerland) Dario Cabanelas | R | 1–7 |
| (Netherlands) MP Motorsport | 34 | (Kyrgyzstan) Georgy Zhuravskiy (Note: Blokhina, Smal, Zhuravskiy and Belov are Russian, but they competed under a Kyrgyz licence as Russian national emblems were banned by the FIA following the Russian invasion of Ukraine. Bedrin, also a Russian, competed under an Italian licence for the same reason.) | R | 7–8 |
| (Netherlands) MP Motorsport | 55 | (Italy) Valerio Rinicella | R | NC |
| (Spain) Palou Motorsport | 4 | (Kyrgyzstan) Kirill Smal | | 1–2 |
| (Spain) Palou Motorsport | 4 | (France) Pierre-Louis Chovet | | 6 |
| (Spain) Palou Motorsport | 4 | (Hong Kong) Gerrard Xie | G | 7 |
| (Spain) Palou Motorsport | 4 | (United States) Everett Stack | G | 8 |
| (Spain) Palou Motorsport | 10 | (France) Luciano Morano | R | All |
| (Spain) Palou Motorsport | 18 | (United States) Garrett Berry | R | NC, All |
| (Spain) Palou Motorsport | 30 | (Denmark) Theodor Jensen | R | NC, All |
| (Spain) / Drivex (Note: Cars No. 7, No. 13, No. 20, No. 21 and No. 64 entered as Drivex, cars No. 25, No. 26, No. 43 and No. 48 entered as DXR by Drivex.); (Spain) / DXR by Drivex | 7 | (Kyrgyzstan) Georgy Zhuravskiy | R | NC, 1–6 |
| (Spain) / Drivex; (Spain) / DXR by Drivex | 7 | (Kyrgyzstan) Michael Belov | G | 7 |
| (Spain) / Drivex; (Spain) / DXR by Drivex | 7 | (Italy) Nikita Bedrin | G | 8 |
| (Spain) / Drivex; (Spain) / DXR by Drivex | 13 | (Spain) Daniel Nogales | | 1–5 |
| (Spain) / Drivex; (Spain) / DXR by Drivex | 20 | (Switzerland) Gaspard Le Gallais | | NC, All |
| (Spain) / Drivex; (Spain) / DXR by Drivex | 21 | (Kyrgyzstan) Victoria Blokhina | R | NC, All |
| (Spain) / Drivex; (Spain) / DXR by Drivex | 25 | (Colombia) Joao Díaz | R | 2–6 |
| (Spain) / Drivex; (Spain) / DXR by Drivex | 26 | (France) Hadrien David | | 6 |
| (Spain) / Drivex; (Spain) / DXR by Drivex | 43 | (Sweden) Linus Hellberg | G | 6–8 |
| (Spain) / Drivex; (Spain) / DXR by Drivex | 48 | (Sweden) Emil Hellberg | G | 6–8 |
| (Spain) / Drivex; (Spain) / DXR by Drivex | 64 | (Canada) Nick Gilkes | | 1–6 |
| (Spain) / Drivex; (Spain) / DXR by Drivex | 64 | (Colombia) Joao Díaz | R | 7 |
| (Spain) / Drivex; (Spain) / DXR by Drivex | 64 | (United States) Preston Lambert | R G | 8 |
| (Spain) GRS Team | 9 | (Bulgaria) Nikola Tsolov | | 1, 3, 5–7 |
| (Spain) GRS Team | 9 | (Netherlands) Emely de Heus | | 2, 8 |
| (Spain) GRS Team | 72 | (Netherlands) Emely de Heus | | 3, 5 |
| (Spain) GRS Team | 72 | (Belgium) Douwe Dedecker | R | 6–7 |
| (Spain) GRS Team | 72 | (Spain) Mari Boya | G | 8 |
| (Spain) GRS Team | 77 | (United Kingdom) Isaac Barashi | R | All |
| (France) Saintéloc Racing | 12 | (Kazakhstan) Alexander Abkhazava | | NC, All |
| (France) Saintéloc Racing | 17 | (Spain) Daniel Nogales | | 6 |
| (France) Saintéloc Racing | 44 | (Mexico) Diego de la Torre | R | NC, All |
| (France) Saintéloc Racing | 69 | (United Kingdom) Finley Green | | 1–4, 6 |
| (France) Saintéloc Racing | 69 | (Sri Lanka) Yevan David | | 5 |
| (France) Saintéloc Racing | 69 | (United Kingdom) James Hedley | G | 7 |
| (France) Saintéloc Racing | 69 | (United Arab Emirates) Matteo Quintarelli | R G | 8 |
| (France) Saintéloc Racing | 99 | (Italy) Matteo de Palo | | NC |
| (France) Saintéloc Racing | 99 | (Mexico) José Garfias | | 1–6 |
| (France) Saintéloc Racing | 99 | (Spain) Daniel Nogales | | 7–8 |

| Icon | Legend |
|---|---|
| R | Rookie |

- Evans GP originally announced that it planned to enter the championship in cooperation with Versa Motorsport. It had already signed Cooper Webster and planned to field three cars, but after missing the first two rounds, it was confirmed the team had abandoned these plans.
- Monlau Motorsport also announced their entry into the championship, but later confirmed it would not join in 2024.
- Jorge Campos was initially announced to join Saintéloc Racing for his second Eurocup-3 campaign, but did not enter any rounds.

== Race calendar ==
The calendar for the 2024 season was announced on 20 November 2023. The race tally remained the same, at 16 races across eight tracks. The series debuted at the Red Bull Ring, at Algarve International Circuit and at Circuit Paul Ricard, while Monza, Estoril and the Circuit Ricardo Tormo did not return to the schedule. As the series shared its promoter with the F4 Spanish Championship, five of the eight rounds were held together with that series. The calendar was slightly amended later on, moving the penultimate round one week back. A one-event winter series separate from the main championship was also held at MotorLand Aragón. After the second race at Spa was cancelled because of bad weather conditions, a third race at Portimão was added to keep the season's race tally at 16.

| Round | | Circuit | Date | Support bill | Map of circuit locations |
|---|---|---|---|---|---|
| Winter series | | | | | 2024 Eurocup-3 season is located in Europe |
| NC | 1 | (Spain) MotorLand Aragón, Alcañiz | 3 March | GT Winter Series; Formula Winter Series | 2024 Eurocup-3 season is located in Europe |
| NC | 2 | (Spain) MotorLand Aragón, Alcañiz | 3 March | GT Winter Series; Formula Winter Series | 2024 Eurocup-3 season is located in Europe |
| Main championship | | | | | 2024 Eurocup-3 season is located in Europe |
| 1 | R1 | (Belgium) Circuit de Spa-Francorchamps, Stavelot | 19 April | 24H Series; Prototype Cup Germany | 2024 Eurocup-3 season is located in Europe |
| 1 | R2 | (Belgium) Circuit de Spa-Francorchamps, Stavelot | 20 April | 24H Series; Prototype Cup Germany | 2024 Eurocup-3 season is located in Europe |
| 2 | R1 | (Austria) Red Bull Ring, Spielberg | 19 May | ESET Cup Series; TCR Eastern Europe Trophy | 2024 Eurocup-3 season is located in Europe |
| 2 | R2 | (Austria) Red Bull Ring, Spielberg | 19 May | ESET Cup Series; TCR Eastern Europe Trophy | 2024 Eurocup-3 season is located in Europe |
| 3 | R1 | (Portugal) Algarve International Circuit, Portimão | 8 June | Porsche Sprint Challenge Iberica; F4 Spanish Championship | 2024 Eurocup-3 season is located in Europe |
| 3 | R2 | (Portugal) Algarve International Circuit, Portimão | 9 June | Porsche Sprint Challenge Iberica; F4 Spanish Championship | 2024 Eurocup-3 season is located in Europe |
| 3 | R3 | (Portugal) Algarve International Circuit, Portimão | 9 June | Porsche Sprint Challenge Iberica; F4 Spanish Championship | 2024 Eurocup-3 season is located in Europe |
| 4 | R1 | (France) Circuit Paul Ricard, Le Castellet | 6 July | V de V 6 Hours of Paul Ricard; F4 Spanish Championship | 2024 Eurocup-3 season is located in Europe |
| 4 | R2 | (France) Circuit Paul Ricard, Le Castellet | 7 July | V de V 6 Hours of Paul Ricard; F4 Spanish Championship | 2024 Eurocup-3 season is located in Europe |
| 5 | R1 | (Netherlands) Circuit Zandvoort, Zandvoort | 13 July | Zandvoort Summer Trophy; Prototype Cup Germany | 2024 Eurocup-3 season is located in Europe |
| 5 | R2 | (Netherlands) Circuit Zandvoort, Zandvoort | 14 July | Zandvoort Summer Trophy; Prototype Cup Germany | 2024 Eurocup-3 season is located in Europe |
| 6 | R1 | (Spain) MotorLand Aragón, Alcañiz | 27 July | Porsche Sprint Challenge Iberica; F4 Spanish Championship | 2024 Eurocup-3 season is located in Europe |
| 6 | R2 | (Spain) MotorLand Aragón, Alcañiz | 28 July | Porsche Sprint Challenge Iberica; F4 Spanish Championship | 2024 Eurocup-3 season is located in Europe |
| 7 | R1 | (Spain) Circuito de Jerez, Jerez de la Frontera | 5 October | Porsche Sprint Challenge Iberica; F4 Spanish Championship | 2024 Eurocup-3 season is located in Europe |
| 7 | R2 | (Spain) Circuito de Jerez, Jerez de la Frontera | 6 October | Porsche Sprint Challenge Iberica; F4 Spanish Championship | 2024 Eurocup-3 season is located in Europe |
| 8 | R1 | (Spain) Circuit de Barcelona-Catalunya, Montmeló | 9 November | Porsche Sprint Challenge Iberica; F4 Spanish Championship | 2024 Eurocup-3 season is located in Europe |
| 8 | R2 | (Spain) Circuit de Barcelona-Catalunya, Montmeló | 10 November | Porsche Sprint Challenge Iberica; F4 Spanish Championship | 2024 Eurocup-3 season is located in Europe |

== Race results ==
| Round | | Circuit | Pole position | Fastest lap | Winning driver | Winning team | Rookie winner |
|---|---|---|---|---|---|---|---|
| NC | R1 | (Spain) MotorLand Aragón | (Singapore) Christian Ho | (Italy) Valerio Rinicella | (Italy) Valerio Rinicella | (Netherlands) MP Motorsport | (Italy) Valerio Rinicella |
| NC | R2 | (Spain) MotorLand Aragón | (Italy) Valerio Rinicella | (Italy) Valerio Rinicella | (Italy) Valerio Rinicella | (Netherlands) MP Motorsport | (Italy) Valerio Rinicella |
| 1 | R1 | (Belgium) Circuit de Spa-Francorchamps | (Vietnam) Owen Tangavelou (Note: Free practice and both qualifying sessions were cancelled because of adverse weather conditions. The grid was set according to the times of the pre-event test, and therefore, no points for the pole position were awarded to Owen Tangavelou.) | (Spain) Javier Sagrera | (Spain) Javier Sagrera | (Netherlands) MP Motorsport | (Germany) Valentin Kluss |
| 1 | R2 | (Belgium) Circuit de Spa-Francorchamps | Cancelled because of adverse weather conditions, replaced by a round at Algarve International Circuit. | | | | |
| 2 | R1 | (Austria) Red Bull Ring | (Vietnam) Owen Tangavelou | (Vietnam) Owen Tangavelou | (Vietnam) Owen Tangavelou | (Netherlands) MP Motorsport | (Switzerland) Dario Cabanelas |
| 2 | R2 | (Austria) Red Bull Ring | (Singapore) Christian Ho | (Switzerland) Dario Cabanelas | (Spain) Bruno del Pino | (Netherlands) MP Motorsport | (Singapore) Christian Ho |
| 3 | R1 | (Portugal) Algarve International Circuit | (Singapore) Christian Ho | (Singapore) Christian Ho | (Singapore) Christian Ho | (Spain) Campos Racing | (Singapore) Christian Ho |
| 3 | R2 | (Portugal) Algarve International Circuit | (Germany) Valentin Kluss | (Germany) Valentin Kluss | (Singapore) Christian Ho | (Spain) Campos Racing | (Singapore) Christian Ho |
| 3 | R3 | (Portugal) Algarve International Circuit | (Singapore) Christian Ho | (Spain) Bruno del Pino | (Kazakhstan) Alexander Abkhazava | (France) Saintéloc Racing | (Germany) Valentin Kluss |
| 4 | R1 | (France) Circuit Paul Ricard | (Singapore) Christian Ho | (Singapore) Christian Ho | (Spain) Bruno del Pino | (Netherlands) MP Motorsport | (Singapore) Christian Ho |
| 4 | R2 | (France) Circuit Paul Ricard | (Singapore) Christian Ho | (Singapore) Christian Ho | (Singapore) Christian Ho | (Spain) Campos Racing | (Singapore) Christian Ho |
| 5 | R1 | (Netherlands) Circuit Zandvoort | (Spain) Javier Sagrera | (Spain) Bruno del Pino | (Spain) Javier Sagrera | (Netherlands) MP Motorsport | (Singapore) Christian Ho |
| 5 | R2 | (Netherlands) Circuit Zandvoort | (Spain) Javier Sagrera | (Mexico) José Garfias | (Spain) Javier Sagrera | (Netherlands) MP Motorsport | (Germany) Valentin Kluss |
| 6 | R1 | (Spain) MotorLand Aragón | (Mexico) Jesse Carrasquedo Jr. | (Mexico) Jesse Carrasquedo Jr. | (Mexico) Jesse Carrasquedo Jr. | (Spain) Campos Racing | (Singapore) Christian Ho |
| 6 | R2 | (Spain) MotorLand Aragón | (Vietnam) Owen Tangavelou | (Spain) Daniel Nogales | (Spain) Javier Sagrera | (Netherlands) MP Motorsport | (Singapore) Christian Ho |
| 7 | R1 | (Spain) Circuito de Jerez | (Singapore) Christian Ho | (Singapore) Christian Ho | (Singapore) Christian Ho | (Spain) Campos Racing | (Singapore) Christian Ho |
| 7 | R2 | (Spain) Circuito de Jerez | (Spain) Bruno del Pino | (Spain) Bruno del Pino | (Spain) Bruno del Pino | (Netherlands) MP Motorsport | (Singapore) Christian Ho |
| 8 | R1 | (Spain) Circuit de Barcelona-Catalunya | (Brazil) Emerson Fittipaldi Jr. | (Brazil) Emerson Fittipaldi Jr. | (Singapore) Christian Ho (Note: Emerson Fittipaldi Jr. finished first on track, but following an appeal lodged by Campos Racing, he received a 5-second time penalty for overtaking outside the track limits. Christian Ho inherited the win.) | (Spain) Campos Racing | (Singapore) Christian Ho |
| 8 | R2 | (Spain) Circuit de Barcelona-Catalunya | (Singapore) Christian Ho | (Singapore) Christian Ho | (Singapore) Christian Ho | (Spain) Campos Racing | (Singapore) Christian Ho |

== Season report ==
=== Winter series ===
The second season of Eurocup-3 commenced with a non-championship round at MotorLand Aragón. Christian Ho of Campos Racing and Valerio Rinicella of MP Motorsport secured pole positions for the two races. In the first race, Ho initially led for four laps before being overtaken by MP Motorsport teammates Javier Sagrera and Rinicella. A close battle ensued between the top two, with Rinicella ultimately claiming victory on lap twelve. Ho meanwhile fell further back and relinquished third place to MP's Owen Tangavelou. The second race featured an intense contest for the lead among Rinicella, Ho, and Sagrera, each taking turns at the front. Sagrera, however, encountered car issues and dropped out of contention. Ho briefly slipped to third behind teammate Noah Lisle but regained the position later, allowing Rinicella to capitalize and secure his second win of the event.

=== Main Series ===
The opening round of the season took place at Spa and was significantly affected by heavy rainfall. Following a pre-event test where Tangavelou set the fastest time, adverse weather conditions led to the cancellation of all four practice and qualifying sessions. Consequently, Tangavelou was awarded pole position for the first race, but he was unable to start, allowing Sagrera to lead the field behind the safety car. That was withdrawn after three laps, but was immediately redeployed due to several retirements. As conditions deteriorated further, racing resumed on lap eight, only for a major multi-car collision at Raidillon to bring the event to an early conclusion. Sagrera claimed victory ahead of Saintéloc's Alexander Abkhazava and Palou Motorsport's Kirill Smal. The second race of the weekend was subsequently canceled due to the ongoing weather issues.

Tangavelou and Ho secured pole positions for the second round at the Red Bull Ring. In the first race, slow starts from the second- and third-placed drivers allowed Tangavelou to establish an early lead, followed by Smal in second and MP Motorsport's Bruno del Pino in third. Del Pino then advanced to second place, with teammate Emerson Fittipaldi Jr. also overtaking Smal, but Tangavelou had a comfortable gap at that point and claimed victory. In the second race, pole sitter Ho experienced another poor start, enabling del Pino to pressure and ultimately pass him at turn three to take the lead. Del Pino remained unchallenged, while Ho incurred a five-second penalty for exceeding track limits, relegating him to fourth behind Sagrera and Tangavelou. The championship standings after the event mirrored the results of the second race, with Sagrera leading del Pino by five points.

Round three at Portimão featured three races to compensate for the cancellation of Spa's second race. Ho secured pole position for the first race and converted it into a dominant lights-to-flag victory, aided by a battle for second place between Del Pino and Tangavelou behind him. In the second race, Campos's Valentin Kluss started from pole but was overtaken by Ho and Tangavelou at the first corner. Kluss reclaimed second as Lisle also got through, while Ho secured another unchallenged win. The third race saw pole sitter Ho drop behind Del Pino and Abkhazava at the start, before his weekend ended prematurely with a mechanical failure. On the penultimate lap, Abkhazava overtook Del Pino, who then fell down the order, allowing Sagrera and Kluss to complete the podium. This result left Del Pino, Sagrera, and Tangavelou tied for the championship lead on 78 points.

At the fourth round of the championship at Circuit Paul Ricard, Ho delivered strong performances in qualifying to secure pole position for both races. However, in the first race, he fell behind Del Pino and Sagrera at the start. Despite setting the fastest laps of the race, Ho took 13 laps to reclaim second place, by which time Del Pino had already established a lead. Ho closed up to the leader, but had not enough time to threaten Del Pino. In the second race, Ho successfully defended his position from Sagrera at the start. He then built a comfortable gap and managed the race to claim a lights-to-flag victory. Jesse Carrasquedo Jr., a new addition to Campos Racing's lineup for that round, secured third place after passing Barrichello Jr. at the start, but was unable to challenge Sagrera. Ho's victory propelled him to the top of the championship standings, two points ahead of Sagrera.

=== Second half ===
The second half of the championship began at Circuit Zandvoort, where Sagrera took both pole positions. The first race started under safety car conditions due to issues with the starting lights. A severe collision involving Abkhazava and Campos driver Michael Shin, whose car rolled over seven times, disrupted the event. The race was red-flagged, and rain began to fall during the suspension. Following the restart, Sagrera led Ho and Del Pino, with the podium positions unchanged until the race concluded prematurely under safety car conditions. The second race proved less dramatic; Sagrera defended against an early attack by Del Pino following a safety car phase and controlled the race to secure another victory, extending his championship lead to 23 points over Ho. Kluss completed the podium, while Shin finished ninth, less than 24 hours after his crash.

Carrasquedo Jr. and Tangavelou secured pole positions on EuroCup-3's main season return to Aragón. Sagrera started the first race from second place, but collided with Tangavelou approaching the first corner, taking them both out of the race. This allowed Ho and Shin to move into second and third. Ho engaged in a close battle with Carrasquedo Jr. for the lead, but the Mexican driver secured his maiden series win, while Ho narrowed the points gap to Sagrera. Race two was delayed due to a collision during the formation lap. Once underway, Tangavelou and Del Pino contested the lead, before Sagrera overtook them both. He controlled the race to lead Del Pino and Ho home before they were both penalized post-race. That saw Fittipaldi Jr. and GRS driver Nikola Tsolov claim podium finishes, while Sagrera grew his championship lead to 28 points.

The penultimate round of the season was held at Circuito de Jerez. In qualifying for the first race, Ho secured pole position. Del Pino started second but stalled at the beginning, dropping back to 25th place. Sagrera advanced to second place and defended his position against Shin, who had climbed from sixth to third. The race order stabilized, allowing Ho to claim a dominant victory by 9.37 seconds and reduce Sagrera's championship lead to 14 points. For the second race, Del Pino started on pole and achieved an unchallenged lights-to-flag victory. The podium positions mirrored the first race, with Sagrera finishing second and Shin third. Ho placed fifth, losing ground to Sagrera in the championship standings. Heading into the final weekend, Sagrera led Ho by 26 points. Del Pino in third remained in contention, trailing by an additional ten points.

The title decider at Barcelona began with Fittipaldi Jr. securing pole position for the first race, which he converted into a victory after defending his lead against Ho. Sagrera only earned ten points, narrowing his championship lead to twelve points. In the second qualifying session, Ho claimed a critical pole position, earning two additional points. He went on to win the second race, while Sagrera initially finished fifth - just enough to secure the title. However, Sagrera received a post-race penalty that would have cost him two points and handed the title to Ho. Simultaneously, Sagrera's teammate Tangavelou, who finished behind him, was disqualified due to a parc fermé violation, meaning Sagrera's penalty did not affect his points tally. Ho's team protested both race results, leading to a lengthy appeal process and Sagrera being named champion provisionally.

Over three months later, in late February 2025, the FIA International Court of Appeal announced that it had decided Fittipaldi Jr.’s defensive move was made outside the track limits. He was therefore hit with a five-second penalty, handing Ho the win and crowning him champion in the end. This controversial final round and the subsequent extensive investigation overshadowed a season that saw both a close, exciting championship battle and significant growth for the series itself. Ho and Sagrera fought a tight battle all season, with Sagrera earning four wins and six podiums, while Ho claimed five victories and four podiums. Interest in the championship meanwhile rose rapidly in 2024 as the series reached a milestone of 30 cars in a single round in just its second year.

== Championship standings ==
=== Scoring system ===
Points were awarded to the top ten classified finishers. Additional points were awarded for setting the fastest lap during a race or qualifying on pole position.

| Position | **1st** | **2nd** | **3rd** | **4th** | **5th** | **6th** | **7th** | **8th** | **9th** | **10th** | **Pole** | **FL** |
| Points | 25 | 18 | 15 | 12 | 10 | 8 | 6 | 4 | 2 | 1 | 2 | 1 |

=== Drivers' standings ===
| Pos | Driver | ARA1 (Spain) | | SPA (Belgium) | | RBR (Austria) | | POR (Portugal) | | | LEC (France) | | ZAN (Netherlands) | | ARA2 (Spain) | | JER (Spain) | | CAT (Spain) | | Pts |
| Pos | Driver | NC | | R1 | R2 | R1 | R2 | R1 | R2 | R3 | R1 | R2 | R1 | R2 | R1 | R2 | R1 | R2 | R1 | R2 | Pts |
|---|---|---|---|---|---|---|---|---|---|---|---|---|---|---|---|---|---|---|---|---|---|
| 1 | (Singapore) Christian Ho | **4** | 2 | 22† | C | Ret | **4** | **1** | 1 | **21**† | **2** | **1** | 2 | 5 | 2 | 9 | **1** | 5 | 1 | **1** | 255 |
| 2 | (Spain) Javier Sagrera | 2 | 13† | 1 | C | 8 | 2 | 5 | 8 | 2 | 3 | 2 | **1** | **1** | Ret | 1 | 2 | 2 | 6 | 6 | 250 |
| 3 | (Spain) Bruno del Pino | | | 18 | C | 2 | 1 | 2 | 7 | 4 | 1 | 10 | 3 | 2 | 4 | 4 | 12 | **1** | 3 | 11 | 209 |
| 4 | (Vietnam) Owen Tangavelou | 3 | 4 | **DNS** | C | **1** | 3 | 3 | 4 | 5 | 5 | 5 | 4 | 4 | Ret | **6** | 6 | 8 | 7 | DSQ | 158 |
| 5 | (Brazil) Emerson Fittipaldi Jr. | 6 | 7 | 4 | C | 3 | 5 | 20† | 6 | 16 | 8 | 6 | 8 | 17 | 14 | 2 | 4 | 4 | **2** | 2 | 142 |
| 6 | (Germany) Valentin Kluss | 10† | Ret | 7 | C | 19 | 6 | 6 | **2** | 3 | 7 | 4 | 12 | 3 | 7 | 7 | 9 | 10 | 9 | 8 | 121 |
| 7 | (South Korea) Michael Shin | 5 | 5 | 11 | C | 9 | 7 | Ret | 3 | 6 | 9 | 8 | Ret | 9 | 3 | 8 | 3 | 3 | 8 | 10 | 98 |
| 8 | (Mexico) Jesse Carrasquedo Jr. | | | | | | | | | | Ret | 3 | 13 | 21 | **1** | 10 | 8 | 6 | 4 | 7 | 80 |
| 9 | (Kazakhstan) Alexander Abkhazava | WD | WD | 2 | C | 6 | 24 | 4 | Ret | 1 | 6 | 9 | Ret | Ret | 25† | 11 | 13 | 14 | 10 | 12 | 76 |
| 10 | (Mexico) José Garfias | | | 6 | C | 7 | 23 | Ret | 5 | 20 | 4 | 7 | 22 | 6 | 10 | 13 | | | | | 52 |
| 11 | (Bulgaria) Nikola Tsolov | | | Ret | C | | | 9 | 9 | 8 | | | 6 | 8 | 5 | 3 | 10 | Ret | | | 47 |
| 12 | (Australia) Noah Lisle | Ret | 3 | Ret | C | 5 | 12 | 8 | 15 | Ret | 21 | 11 | 5 | 20 | 8 | 5 | 7 | 12 | 13 | 17 | 47 |
| 13 | (Kyrgyzstan) Kirill Smal | | | 3 | C | 4 | Ret | | | | | | | | | | | | | | 27 |
| 14 | (Denmark) Theodor Jensen | Ret | 10 | 9 | C | 18 | 10 | Ret | 10 | 7 | 15 | 19 | 7 | 16 | 9 | 18 | 11 | Ret | 18 | 9 | 25 |
| 15 | (Spain) Daniel Nogales | | | 13 | C | 12 | 9 | 10 | 11 | 17 | 11 | 13 | 11 | 12 | 11 | 17 | Ret | 9 | Ret | 4 | 23 |
| 16 | (Switzerland) Dario Cabanelas | | | 8 | C | 10 | 16 | 7 | 21 | 12 | 20 | 22 | Ret | 10 | 19 | Ret | WD | WD | | | 13 |
| 17 | (Morocco) Suleiman Zanfari | 8 | 6 | 5 | C | DNS | DNS | 19† | 19 | 10 | | | | | | | | | | | 11 |
| 18 | (France) Hadrien David | | | | | | | | | | | | | | 6 | 21 | | | | | 8 |
| 19 | (Sri Lanka) Yevan David | | | | | | | | | | | | 10 | 7 | | | | | | | 7 |
| 20 | (United Kingdom) Isaac Barashi | | | 21 | C | 11 | 8 | 15 | 20 | 19 | 17 | 16 | 9 | 18 | 12 | 22† | 18 | 19 | 20 | 19 | 6 |
| 21 | (United States) Garrett Berry | 7 | 9 | 15 | C | 14 | 13 | 18 | 14 | 9 | 13 | 12 | 20 | 11 | 26† | Ret | 20 | Ret | 17 | 23† | 2 |
| 22 | (Kyrgyzstan) Georgy Zhuravskiy | 9 | 8 | 14 | C | Ret | 11 | 13 | 18 | 11 | 10 | 14 | 16 | 22 | 21 | Ret | 15 | 15 | 11 | 13 | 2 |
| 23 | (Canada) Nick Gilkes | | | 10 | C | 16 | 20 | 12 | 16 | 13 | Ret | 15 | 16 | 19 | 16 | 19 | | | | | 1 |
| 24 | (Mexico) Diego de la Torre | WD | WD | 12 | C | 20 | 14 | 11 | 13 | 18 | 14 | Ret | 15 | 13 | Ret | Ret | 14 | 16 | 19 | 14 | 0 |
| 25 | (France) Luciano Morano | | | 16 | C | 15 | 19 | Ret | 12 | Ret | 12 | 17 | 19 | 14 | 13 | 23† | 16 | 18 | 16 | 24† | 0 |
| 26 | (Colombia) Joao Díaz | | | | | Ret | 21 | 17 | 22 | Ret | 19 | 20 | DNS | 15 | 18 | 12 | 19 | 17 | | | 0 |
| 27 | (Kyrgyzstan) Victoria Blokhina | Ret | 11 | 17 | C | 17 | 18 | 16 | Ret | DNS | 18 | 18 | 18 | 25 | 20 | 16 | 22 | 20 | 12 | 16 | 0 |
| 28 | (Switzerland) Gaspard Le Gallais | Ret | 12 | 20 | C | Ret | 17 | 14 | 17 | 15 | 16 | 21 | 21 | 24 | 24 | 20 | 24 | 13 | DSQ | 22 | 0 |
| 29 | (Netherlands) Emely de Heus | | | | | 13 | 15 | Ret | DNS | 14 | | | 17 | 23 | | | | | DNS | Ret | 0 |
| 30 | (Belgium) Douwe Dedecker | | | | | | | | | | | | | | 15 | Ret | WD | WD | | | 0 |
| 31 | (France) Pierre-Louis Chovet | | | | | | | | | | | | | | 17 | Ret | | | | | 0 |
| 32 | (United Kingdom) Finley Green | | | 19 | C | Ret | 22 | DNS | DNS | DNS | WD | WD | | | DNS | DNS | | | | | 0 |
Guest drivers ineligible to score points
| — | (Italy) Nikita Bedrin | | | | | | | | | | | | | | | | | | 5 | 3 | — |
| — | (Kyrgyzstan) Michael Belov | | | | | | | | | | | | | | | | 5 | 7 | | | — |
| — | (Spain) Mari Boya | | | | | | | | | | | | | | | | | | 15 | 5 | — |
| — | (United Kingdom) James Hedley | | | | | | | | | | | | | | | | 17 | 11 | | | — |
| — | (Sweden) Linus Hellberg | | | | | | | | | | | | | | 22 | 14 | 23 | 21 | Ret | 21 | — |
| — | (United States) Everett Stack | | | | | | | | | | | | | | | | | | 14 | Ret | — |
| — | (Sweden) Emil Hellberg | | | | | | | | | | | | | | 23 | 15 | 21 | 22 | 22 | 18 | — |
| — | (United States) Preston Lambert | | | | | | | | | | | | | | | | | | 21 | 15 | — |
| — | (United Arab Emirates) Matteo Quintarelli | | | | | | | | | | | | | | | | | | Ret | 20 | — |
| — | (Hong Kong) Gerrard Xie | | | | | | | | | | | | | | | | WD | WD | | | — |
Non-championship round-only drivers
| — | (Italy) Valerio Rinicella | 1 | **1** | | | | | | | | | | | | | | | | | | — |
| — | (Italy) Matteo de Palo | WD | WD | | | | | | | | | | | | | | | | | | — |
| Pos | Driver | NC | | R1 | R2 | R1 | R2 | R1 | R2 | R3 | R1 | R2 | R1 | R2 | R1 | R2 | R1 | R2 | R1 | R2 | Pts |
| Pos | Driver | ARA1 (Spain) | | SPA (Belgium) | | RBR (Austria) | | POR (Portugal) | | | LEC (France) | | ZAN (Netherlands) | | ARA2 (Spain) | | JER (Spain) | | CAT (Spain) | | Pts |

| Colour | Result |
|---|---|
| Gold | Winner |
| Silver | Second place |
| Bronze | Third place |
| Green | Points classification |
| Blue | Non-points classification |
| Blue | Non-classified finish (NC) |
| Purple | Retired, not classified (Ret) |
| Red | Did not qualify (DNQ) |
| Red | Did not pre-qualify (DNPQ) |
| Black | Disqualified (DSQ) |
| White | Did not start (DNS) |
| White | Withdrew (WD) |
| White | Race cancelled (C) |
| Blank | Did not practice (DNP) |
| Blank | Did not arrive (DNA) |
| Blank | Excluded (EX) |

**Bold** – Pole

Italics – Fastest Lap

† — Did not finish, but classified
Rookie

=== Teams' standings ===
Each team counted their two best results per race and the bonus points for fastest laps if applicable.

| Pos | Driver | ARA1 (Spain) | | SPA (Belgium) | | RBR (Austria) | | POR (Portugal) | | | LEC (France) | | ZAN (Netherlands) | | ARA2 (Spain) | | JER (Spain) | | CAT (Spain) | | Pts |
| Pos | Driver | NC | | R1 | R2 | R1 | R2 | R1 | R2 | R3 | R1 | R2 | R1 | R2 | R1 | R2 | R1 | R2 | R1 | R2 | Pts |
|---|---|---|---|---|---|---|---|---|---|---|---|---|---|---|---|---|---|---|---|---|---|
| 1 | (Netherlands) MP Motorsport | 1 | 1 | 1 | C | 1 | 1 | 2 | 4 | 2 | 1 | 2 | 1 | 1 | 4 | 1 | 2 | 1 | 2 | 2 | 554 |
| 1 | (Netherlands) MP Motorsport | 2 | 4 | 4 | C | 2 | 2 | 3 | 6 | 4 | 3 | 5 | 3 | 2 | 14 | 2 | 4 | 2 | 3 | 6 | 554 |
| 2 | (Spain) Campos Racing | 4 | 2 | 5 | C | 5 | 4 | 1 | 1 | 3 | 2 | 1 | 2 | 3 | 1 | 5 | 1 | 3 | 1 | 1 | 467 |
| 2 | (Spain) Campos Racing | 5 | 3 | 7 | C | 9 | 6 | 6 | 2 | 6 | 7 | 3 | 5 | 4 | 2 | 7 | 3 | 5 | 4 | 7 | 467 |
| 3 | (France) Saintéloc Racing | WD | WD | 2 | C | 6 | 14 | 4 | 5 | 1 | 4 | 7 | 10 | 6 | 10 | 11 | 13 | 9 | 10 | 4 | 155 |
| 3 | (France) Saintéloc Racing | WD | WD | 6 | C | 7 | 22 | 11 | 14 | 18 | 6 | 9 | 15 | 7 | 11 | 17 | 14 | 11 | 20 | 12 | 155 |
| 4 | (Spain) Palou Motorsport | 7 | 9 | 3 | C | 4 | 10 | 18 | 10 | 7 | 12 | 12 | 7 | 11 | 9 | 18 | 11 | 18 | 14 | 9 | 54 |
| 4 | (Spain) Palou Motorsport | Ret | 10 | 9 | C | 14 | 13 | Ret | 13 | 9 | 13 | 17 | 20 | 14 | 13 | 23† | 16 | Ret | 17 | 23† | 54 |
| 5 | (Spain) GRS Team | | | 21 | C | 11 | 8 | 9 | 10 | 8 | 17 | 16 | 6 | 8 | 5 | 3 | 10 | 19 | 15 | 5 | 53 |
| 5 | (Spain) GRS Team | | | Ret | C | 13 | 15 | 15 | 20 | 14 | | | 9 | 18 | 16 | Ret | 18 | Ret | 16 | 19 | 53 |
| 6 | (Spain) DXR by Drivex | | | | | Ret | 21 | 17 | 22 | Ret | 19 | 20 | DNS | 15 | 6 | 14 | 21 | 21 | 22 | 18 | 8 |
| 6 | (Spain) DXR by Drivex | | | | | | | | | | | | | | 18 | 15 | 23 | 22 | Ret | 21 | 8 |
| 7 | (Spain) Drivex | 9 | 8 | 10 | C | 12 | 9 | 10 | 12 | 11 | 10 | 13 | 12 | 12 | 16 | 16 | 5 | 7 | 5 | 3 | 5 |
| 7 | (Spain) Drivex | Ret | 11 | 13 | C | 16 | 11 | 12 | 16 | 13 | 11 | 14 | 15 | 19 | 20 | 19 | 15 | 13 | 12 | 15 | 5 |
| Pos | Driver | NC | | R1 | R2 | R1 | R2 | R1 | R2 | R3 | R1 | R2 | R1 | R2 | R1 | R2 | R1 | R2 | R1 | R2 | Pts |
| Pos | Driver | ARA1 (Spain) | | SPA (Belgium) | | RBR (Austria) | | POR (Portugal) | | | LEC (France) | | ZAN (Netherlands) | | ARA2 (Spain) | | JER (Spain) | | CAT (Spain) | | Pts |
