= 0H =

0H (zero H) or 0-H may refer to:

- 0h, a notation for zero hours
- 0h, the part of the spring equinox meridiator that has the celestial longitude 0° (±0°); see Right ascension

== See also ==
- Oh (disambiguation)
- H0 (disambiguation)
