= Javier Sagrera =

Spanish racing driver (born 2004)

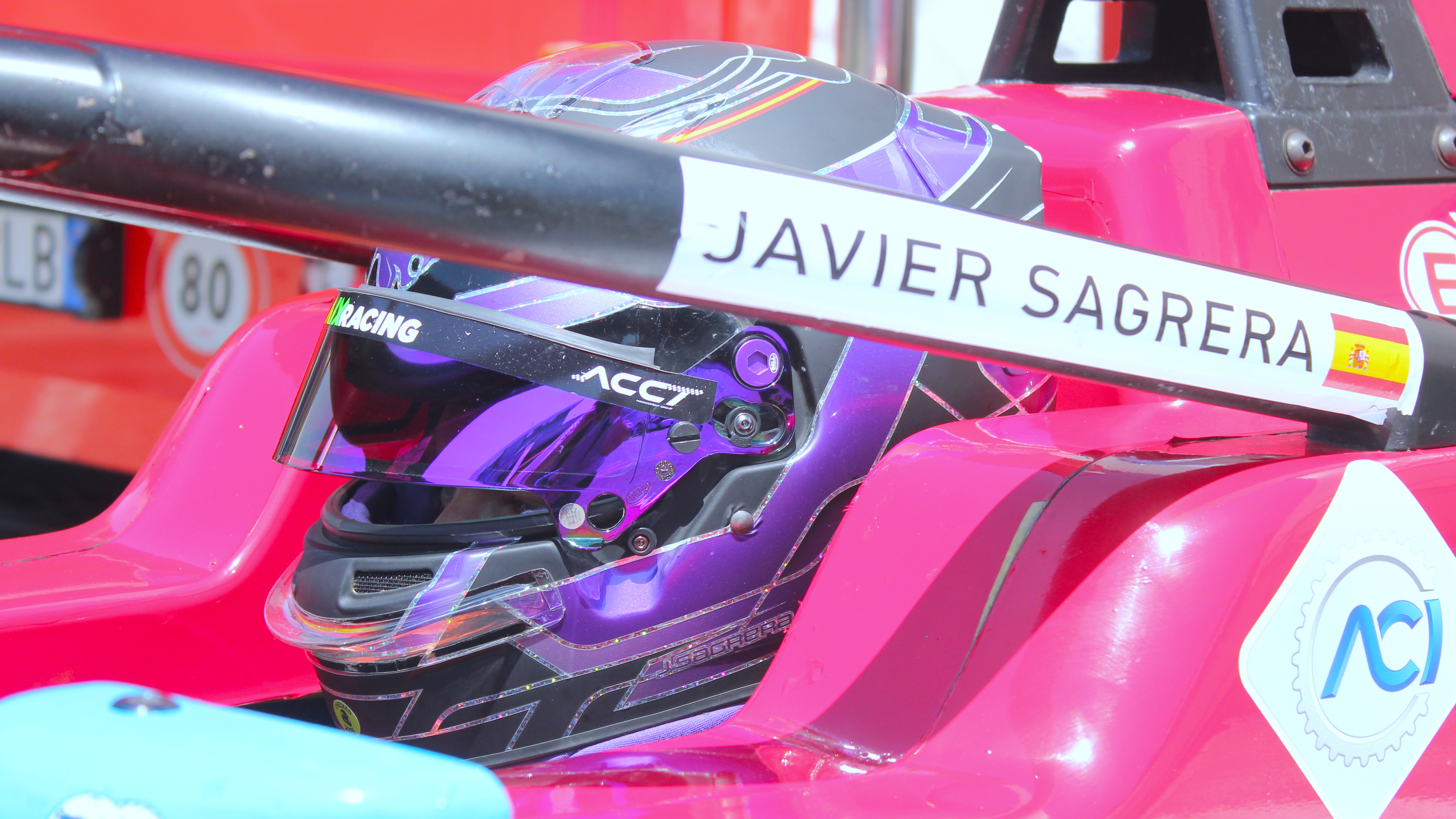
- Sagrera in 2025
- Nationality: (Spain) Spanish
- Born: Francisco Javier Sagrera Pont; 12 January 2004 (age 22) Torroella de Montgrí, Catalonia, Spain

Formula Regional European Championship career
- Debut season: 2023
- Current team: Akcel GP
- Categorisation: FIA Silver
- Car number: 44
- Starts: 4
- Wins: 0
- Podiums: 0
- Poles: 0
- Fastest laps: 0
- Best finish: 37th in 2025

Previous series
- 2025; 2023–2024; 2021–2024 (Note: The exact years Sagrera competed in GB3: 2021–2022, 2024.); 2019–2020: FIA Formula 3; Eurocup-3; GB3; F4 Spanish

Francisco Javier Sagrera Pont (born 12 January 2004) is a Spanish racing driver who last competed in the Formula Regional European Championship for Akcel GP.

Sagrera was the vice-champion of the 2024 Eurocup-3 series, with MP Motorsport. Previously, he raced in the F4 Spanish Championship and the GB3 Championship. He previously competed in the 2025 FIA Formula 3 Championship for AIX Racing.

== Career ==
=== Karting ===
In 2017, Sagrera took part in his first national and continental karting competitions, with second place in the junior category of the Spanish Championship being his most notable achievement that year. He would progress to the senior class the following year, finishing third in the same series, only two points behind the champion. Sagrera finished his karting career at the end of 2019.

=== Lower formulae ===
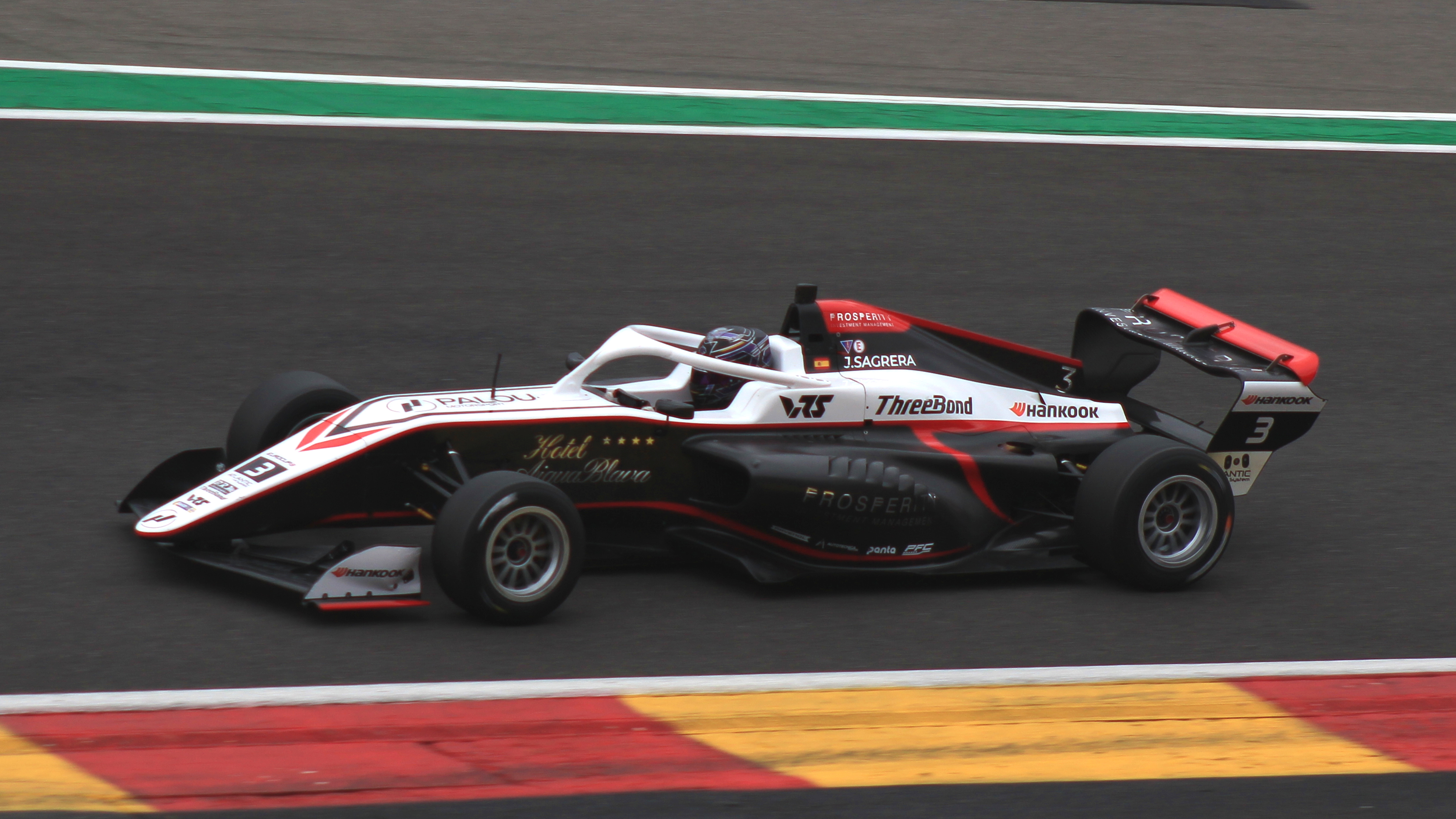
Sagrera during the Eurocup-3 race in Spa 2023

Sagrera made his single-seater debut with MOL Racing in the final round of the F4 Spanish Championship at the Circuit de Barcelona-Catalunya. Despite being a rookie, he managed to finish the third race in the top ten, although he did not receive points as he was classed as a guest driver.

In 2020, Sagrera returned to the Spanish Championship, this time racing the first four rounds of the season for MOL. However, Sagrera was only able to score eight points over the course of the twelve races, and ended up 21st in the standings.

=== GB3 Championship ===
Sagrera stepped up to the GB3 Championship in 2021, partnering Ginetta Junior Champion Tom Lebbon and Mexican José Garfias at Elite Motorsport. He started his season strongly, scoring a podium in just his third race in the series. Sagrera wouldn't manage to hit those same heights again that season, although he only missed out on a top ten finish in five of the following sixteen races he finished.

=== Eurocup-3 ===
==== 2023 ====
Sagrera moved over to the Eurocup-3 series in 2023, signing with Palou Motorsport. He would get three podiums throughout the season, however, he did not contest the last two rounds of the season. Sagrera finished eighth in the standings.

==== 2024 ====
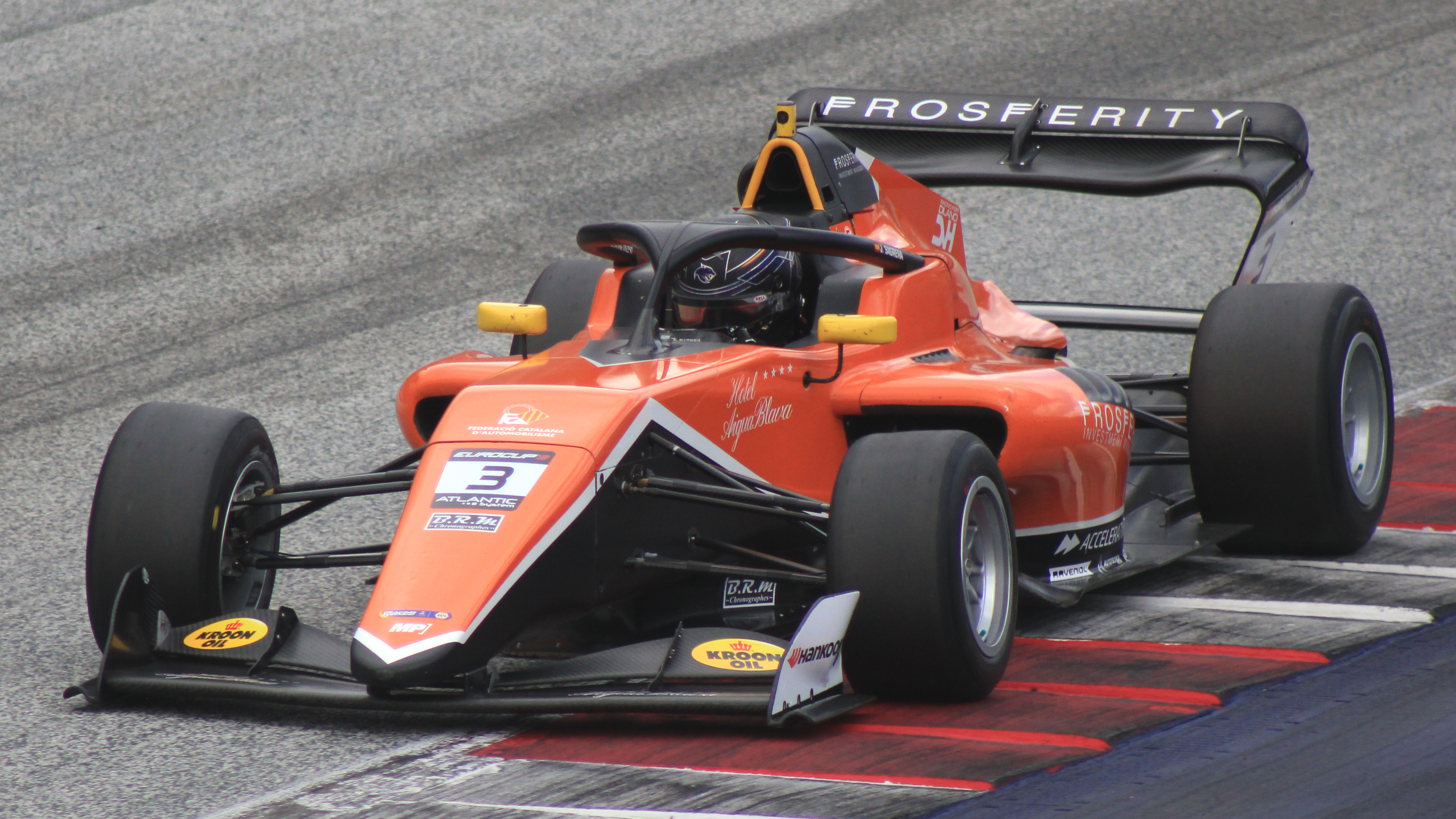
Sagrera racing at the Red Bull Ring during the 2024 Eurocup-3 season.

In 2024, Sagrera signed with MP Motorsport to compete full-time in the 2024 Eurocup-3 season. He would get his maiden win in the first race of the season at Circuit de Spa-Francorchamps. Throughout the first half of the season, Sagrera would get consistent results with occasional podium finishes which allowed him to challenge championship leader Christian Ho. In the fifth round of the season at Zandvoort, Sagrera qualified on pole and won both races. The next race at Aragón saw him retire after lap one following a collision with teammate Owen Tangavelou. However, Sagrera's fortunes would turn in race two as he would win with a comfortable margin to teammate Bruno del Pino. Title rival Christian Ho finished on the podium in both races, however, Ho later received a ten-second time penalty in race two after the race stewards determined that Ho had overtaken Tangavelou outside of the track on lap 1. This dropped Ho to ninth in race two, and resulted in Sagrera becoming the new championship leader following his three wins in the previous four races. While Sagrera would finish in second in both races at Jerez, Ho had a slim chance at the championship following a win in race one and fifth in race two. Going into the final round of the season at Barcelona, Sagrera had a 26 point lead to Ho in the championship. Despite Ho's slim chances in the title fight, he would capitalize by finishing in second in race one and winning race two. Sagrera would only manage to finish sixth in both races, however, this would be enough to crown Sagrera as champion, winning it by just two points. Although, Ho's team Campos Racing had lodged a protest for the race one results, claiming that race one winner Emerson Fittipaldi Jr. had illegally overtaken Ho outside of the track which gave Fittipaldi an unfair advantage. This put the true winner of the championship in doubt for months since the FIA had still not reached a conclusion. Three months later, following a review of results, Ho was awarded the win for the first Barcelona race after the FIA determined that Fittipaldi did indeed overtake off-track. This meant Ho gained seven points and was crowned champion, while Sagrera would ultimately finish second in the championship, five points behind Ho.

=== FIA Formula 3 ===
Sagrera signed with AIX Racing to compete in the 2025 FIA Formula 3 Championship. Following 2 races, Sagrera was replaced by British Driver James Hedley for round three from Imola and onwards.

=== Formula Regional European Championship ===
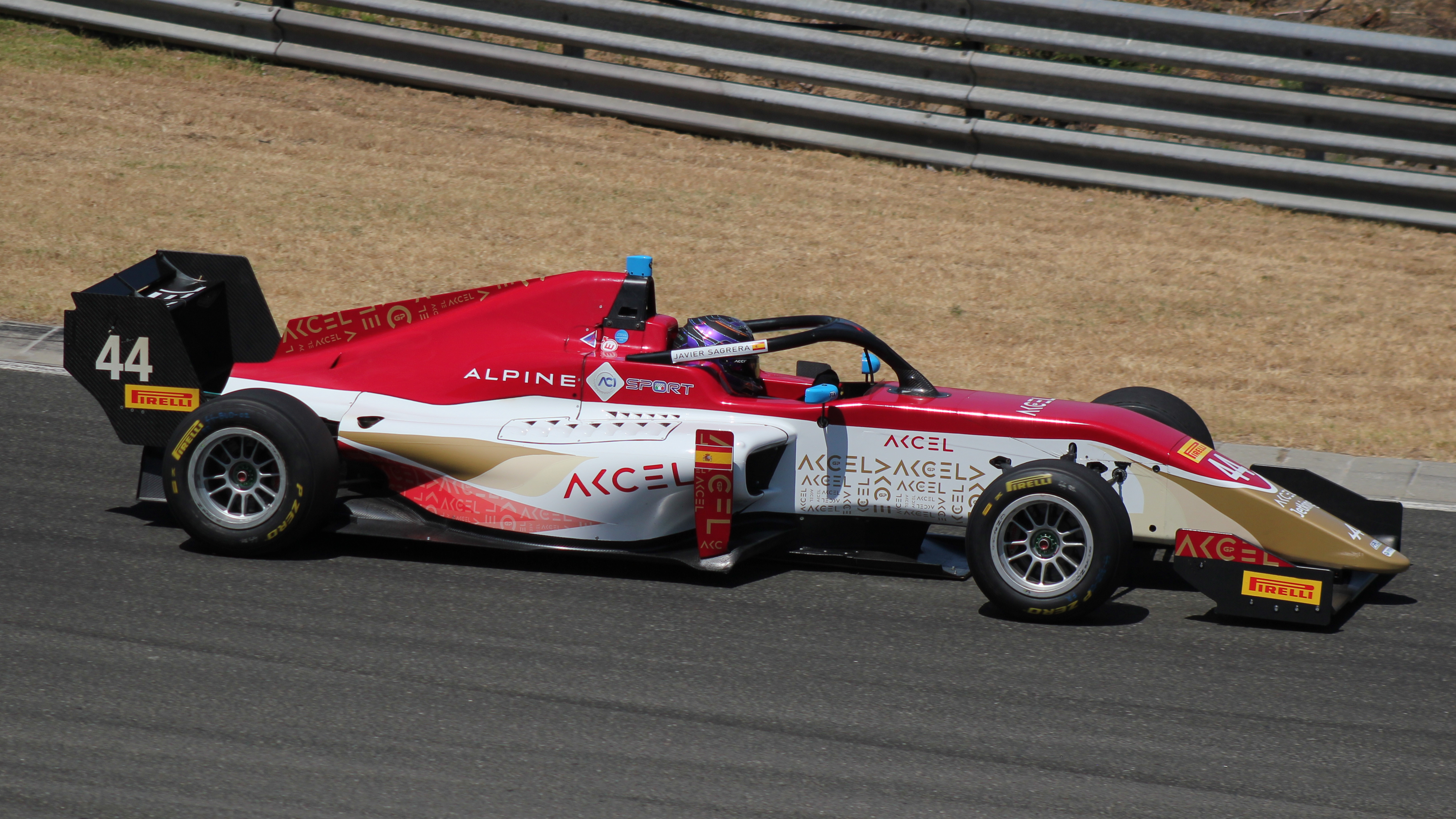
Sagrera driving at the Hungaroring during the 2025 Formula Regional European Championship

==== 2023 ====
Sagrera joined MP Motorsport for the final two rounds of the 2023 Formula Regional European Championship, scoring a best finish of 15th.

==== 2025 ====
After losing his Formula 3 drive, Sagrera signed with AKCEL GP to compete in the 2025 Formula Regional European Championship.

== Racing record ==
=== Career summary ===
| Season | Series | Team | Races | Wins | Poles | F/Laps | Podiums | Points | Position |
|---|---|---|---|---|---|---|---|---|---|
| 2019 | F4 Spanish Championship | MOL Racing | 3 | 0 | 0 | 0 | 0 | 0 | NC† |
| 2020 | F4 Spanish Championship | MOL Racing | 12 | 0 | 0 | 0 | 0 | 8 | 20th |
| 2021 | GB3 Championship | Elite Motorsport | 24 | 0 | 0 | 1 | 1 | 265 | 10th |
| 2022 | GB3 Championship | Carlin | 24 | 0 | 0 | 1 | 1 | 257.5 | 9th |
| 2023 | Eurocup-3 | Palou Motorsport | 12 | 0 | 0 | 0 | 3 | 89 | 8th |
| 2023 | Formula Regional European Championship | MP Motorsport | 4 | 0 | 0 | 0 | 0 | 0 | NC† |
| 2024 | Eurocup-3 | MP Motorsport | 16 | 4 | 2 | 1 | 10 | 250 | 2nd |
| 2024 | GB3 Championship | Chris Dittmann Racing | 3 | 0 | 0 | 0 | 0 | 10 | 31st |
| 2025 | FIA Formula 3 Championship | AIX Racing | 4 | 0 | 0 | 0 | 0 | 0 | 34th |
| 2025 | Formula Regional European Championship | AKCEL GP | 4 | 0 | 0 | 0 | 0 | 0 | 37th |
| 2025 | GT4 European Series - Silver | Speedy Motorsport | 2 | 0 | 0 | 0 | 0 | 0 | NC† |
| 2026 | GT World Challenge Europe Endurance Cup | Oman Racing by Century Motorsport | 5 | 0 | 0 | 0 | 0 | 0 | NC |
| 2026 | Nürburgring Langstrecken-Serie – SP10 | Toyota Racing United | | | | | | | |
| 2026 | GT4 European Series - Silver | Toyota Gazoo Racing Sweden | | | | | | | |

^{†} As Sagrera was a guest driver, he was ineligible for points.
* Season still in progress.

=== Complete F4 Spanish Championship results ===
(key) (Races in bold indicate pole position) (Races in italics indicate fastest lap)

| Year | Team | 1 | 2 | 3 | 4 | 5 | 6 | 7 | 8 | 9 | 10 | 11 | 12 | 13 | 14 | 15 | 16 | 17 | 18 | 19 | 20 | 21 | DC | Points |
|---|---|---|---|---|---|---|---|---|---|---|---|---|---|---|---|---|---|---|---|---|---|---|---|---|
| 2019 | MOL Racing | NAV; 1 | NAV; 2 | NAV; 3 | LEC; 1 | LEC; 2 | LEC; 3 | ARA; 1 | ARA; 2 | ARA; 3 | CRT; 1 | CRT; 2 | CRT; 3 | JER; 1 | JER; 2 | JER; 3 | ALG; 1 | ALG; 2 | ALG; 3 | CAT; 1; 16 | CAT; 2; 11 | CAT; 3; 8 | NC† | 0 |
| 2020 | MOL Racing | NAV; 1; 8 | NAV; 2; 13 | NAV; 3; 10 | LEC; 1; 9 | LEC; 2 Ret | LEC; 3; 21† | JER; 1; 10 | JER; 2; 10 | JER; 3; 17 | CRT; 1 Ret | CRT; 2; 11 | CRT; 3 Ret | ARA; 1 DNA | ARA; 2 DNA | ARA; 3 DNA | JAR; 1 | JAR; 2 | JAR; 3 | CAT; 1 | CAT; 2 | CAT; 3 | 20th | 8 |

=== Complete GB3 Championship results ===
(key) (Races in bold indicate pole position) (Races in italics indicate fastest lap)

| Year | Entrant | 1 | 2 | 3 | 4 | 5 | 6 | 7 | 8 | 9 | 10 | 11 | 12 | 13 | 14 | 15 | 16 | 17 | 18 | 19 | 20 | 21 | 22 | 23 | 24 | DC | Points |
|---|---|---|---|---|---|---|---|---|---|---|---|---|---|---|---|---|---|---|---|---|---|---|---|---|---|---|---|
| 2021 | Elite Motorsport | BRH; 1; 12 | BRH; 2; 12 | BRH; 3; 2^{2} | SIL1; 1; 4 | SIL1; 2; 5 | SIL1; 3 Ret | DON1; 1; 9 | DON1; 2; 4 | DON1; 3; 11^{1} | SPA; 1; 6 | SPA; 2; 7 | SPA; 3; 11 | SNE; 1; 15 | SNE; 2; 10 | SNE; 3; 18 | SIL2; 1; 9 | SIL2; 2; 7 | SIL2; 3; 12^{4} | OUL; 1; 7 | OUL; 2 Ret | OUL; 3; 4^{6} | DON2; 1; 7 | DON2; 2; 11 | DON2; 3 Ret | 10th | 265 |
| 2022 | Carlin | OUL; 1 Ret | OUL; 2; 8 | OUL; 3; 11^{1} | SIL1; 1 Ret | SIL1; 2; 11 | SIL1; 3; 5^{5} | DON1; 1 Ret | DON1; 2; 10 | DON1; 3; 18 | SNE; 1; 7 | SNE; 2; 3 | SNE; 3; 10^{4} | SPA; 1; 5 | SPA; 2; 8 | SPA; 3; 8^{7} | SIL2; 1; 4 | SIL2; 2; 4 | SIL2; 3; 11^{6} | BRH; 1 Ret | BRH; 2; 8 | BRH; 3; 5^{2} | DON2; 1; 7 | DON2; 2; 16 | DON2; 3; 11^{3} | 9th | 257.5 |
| 2024 | Chris Dittmann Racing | OUL; 1 | OUL; 2 | OUL; 3 | SIL; 1 | SIL; 2 | SIL; 3 | SPA; 1 | SPA; 2 | SPA; 3 | HUN; 1; 18 | HUN; 2; 14 | HUN; 3; 19 | ZAN; 1 | ZAN; 2 | ZAN; 3 | SIL2; 1 | SIL2; 2 | SIL2; 3 | DON; 1 | DON; 2 | DON; 3 | BRH; 1 | BRH; 2 | BRH; 3 | 31st | 10 |

=== Complete Eurocup-3 results ===
(key) (Races in bold indicate pole position) (Races in italics indicate fastest lap)

| Year | Team | 1 | 2 | 3 | 4 | 5 | 6 | 7 | 8 | 9 | 10 | 11 | 12 | 13 | 14 | 15 | 16 | 17 | DC | Points |
|---|---|---|---|---|---|---|---|---|---|---|---|---|---|---|---|---|---|---|---|---|
| 2023 | Palou Motorsport | SPA; 1; 13 | SPA; 2; 3 | ARA; 1; 10† | ARA; 2 Ret | MNZ; 1; 4 | MNZ; 2; 2 | ZAN; 1; 5 | ZAN; 2; 8 | JER; 1; 3 | JER; 2; 7 | EST; 1; 13 | EST; 2; 6 | CRT; 1 | CRT; 2 | CAT; 1 | CAT; 2 | | 8th | 89 |
| 2024 | MP Motorsport | SPA; 1; 1 | SPA; 2 C | RBR; 1; 8 | RBR; 2; 2 | POR; 1; 5 | POR; 2; 8 | POR; 3; 2 | LEC; 1; 3 | LEC; 2; 2 | **ZAN**; **1**; 1 | **ZAN**; **2**; 1 | ARA; 1 Ret | ARA; 2; 1 | JER; 1; 2 | JER; 2; 2 | CAT; 1; 6 | CAT; 2; 6 | 2nd | 250 |

=== Complete Formula Regional European Championship results ===
(key) (Races in bold indicate pole position) (Races in italics indicate fastest lap)

| Year | Team | 1 | 2 | 3 | 4 | 5 | 6 | 7 | 8 | 9 | 10 | 11 | 12 | 13 | 14 | 15 | 16 | 17 | 18 | 19 | 20 | DC | Points |
|---|---|---|---|---|---|---|---|---|---|---|---|---|---|---|---|---|---|---|---|---|---|---|---|
| 2023 | MP Motorsport | IMO; 1 | IMO; 2 | CAT; 1 | CAT; 2 | HUN; 1 | HUN; 2 | SPA; 1 | SPA; 2 | MUG; 1 | MUG; 2 | LEC; 1 | LEC; 2 | RBR; 1 | RBR; 2 | MNZ; 1 | MNZ; 2 | ZAN; 1; 28 | ZAN; 2; 15 | HOC; 1; 19 | HOC; 2 Ret | NC† | 0 |
| 2025 | AKCEL GP | MIS; 1 | MIS; 2 | SPA; 1 | SPA; 2 | ZAN; 1 | ZAN; 2 | HUN; 1 DSQ | HUN; 2; 26 | LEC; 1 | LEC; 2 | IMO; 1 Ret | IMO; 2; 20 | RBR; 1 | RBR; 2 | CAT; 1 | CAT; 2 | HOC; 1 | HOC; 2 | MNZ; 1 | MNZ; 2 | 37th | 0 |

^{†} As Sagrera was a guest driver, he was ineligible to score points.
^{*} Season still in progress.

=== Complete FIA Formula 3 Championship results ===
(key) (Races in bold indicate pole position) (Races in italics indicate fastest lap)

| Year | Entrant | 1 | 2 | 3 | 4 | 5 | 6 | 7 | 8 | 9 | 10 | 11 | 12 | 13 | 14 | 15 | 16 | 17 | 18 | 19 | 20 | DC | Points |
|---|---|---|---|---|---|---|---|---|---|---|---|---|---|---|---|---|---|---|---|---|---|---|---|
| 2025 | AIX Racing | MEL; SPR; Ret | MEL; FEA; 15 | BHR; SPR; 23 | BHR; FEA; 24 | IMO; SPR | IMO; FEA | MON; SPR | MON; FEA | CAT; SPR | CAT; FEA | RBR; SPR | RBR; FEA | SIL; SPR | SIL; FEA | SPA; SPR | SPA; FEA | HUN; SPR | HUN; FEA | MNZ; SPR | MNZ; FEA | 34th | 0 |

=== Complete GT World Challenge Europe results ===
==== GT World Challenge Europe Endurance Cup ====
(key) (Races in bold indicate pole position) (Races in italics indicate fastest lap)

| Year | Team | Car | Class | 1 | 2 | 3 | 4 | 5 | 6 | 7 | Pos. | Points |
|---|---|---|---|---|---|---|---|---|---|---|---|---|
| 2026 | Oman Racing by Century Motorsport | BMW M4 GT3 Evo | Bronze | LEC; 29 | MNZ; 12 | SPA; 6H; 55 | SPA; 12H; 48 | SPA; 24H; Ret | NÜR; 33 | ALG; 26 | 8th | 49 |

^{*} Season still in progress.
