= 2025 Melbourne Formula 3 round =

Opening round of the 2025 FIA Formula 3 season

(Australia) 2025 Melbourne Formula 3 round
Round details
- Round 1 of 10 in the 2025 FIA Formula 3 Championship.
- Layout of the Albert Park Circuit
- Location: Albert Park Circuit; Melbourne, Victoria, Australia
- Course: Temporary street circuit 5.278 km (3.280 mi)

Sprint Race
- Date: 15 March 2025
- Laps: 20
Podium
First	(Mexico) Santiago Ramos	Van Amersfoort Racing
Second	(Norway) Martinius Stenshorne	Hitech TGR
Third	(Poland) Roman Bilinski	Rodin Motorsport
Fastest lap
Driver	(Norway) Martinius Stenshorne	Hitech TGR
- Time: 1:38.069 (on lap 10)

Feature Race
- Date: 16 March 2025
- Laps: 16
Pole position
Driver	(Brazil) Rafael Câmara	Trident
Time	1:34.999	
Podium
First	(Brazil) Rafael Câmara	Trident
Second	(Denmark) Noah Strømsted	Trident
Third	(France) Théophile Naël	Van Amersfoort Racing
Fastest lap
Driver	(Brazil) Rafael Câmara	Trident
- Time: 1:49.748 (on lap 11)

The 2025 Melbourne FIA Formula 3 round was a motor racing event held between 13 and 16 March 2025 at the Albert Park Circuit in Melbourne, Australia. It was the opening round of the 2025 FIA Formula 3 Championship and was held in support of the 2025 Australian Grand Prix.

The round marked the first use of the new Formula 3 car, the Dallara F3 2025, during a race weekend.

== Classification ==
=== Summary ===
Rafael Câmara qualified on pole position at Albert Park Circuit, ahead of Noah Strømsted and Théophile Naël. Santiago Ramos won the sprint race, while pole sitter Câmara won the feature race. Câmara leads the championship by 9 points ahead of Naël and 10 points ahead of Strømsted.

=== Qualifying ===
Qualifying was held on 14 March 2025, at 14:00 local time (UTC+11).

Pos.	No.	Driver	Entrant	Time/Gap	Grid SR	Grid FR
1	5	(Brazil) Rafael Câmara	Trident	1:34.999	12	1
2	4	(Denmark) Noah Strømsted	Trident	+0.129	11	2
3	20	(France) Théophile Naël	Van Amersfoort Racing	+0.567	10	3
4	28	(Italy) Nikita Bedrin (Note: Bedrin is a Russian driver competing under an Italian licence.)	AIX Racing	+0.771	9	4
5	17	(Germany) Tim Tramnitz	MP Motorsport	+0.826	8	5
6	6	(Austria) Charlie Wurz	Trident	+0.840	7	6
7	11	(Thailand) Tasanapol Inthraphuvasak	Campos Racing	+0.925	6	7
8	3	(United States) Ugo Ugochukwu	Prema Racing	+1.039	5	8
9	14	(Norway) Martinius Stenshorne	Hitech TGR	+1.120	4	9
10	25	(Poland) Roman Bilinski	Rodin Motorsport	+1.126	3	10
11	30	(Peru) Matías Zagazeta	DAMS Lucas Oil	+1.233	2	11
12	21	(Mexico) Santiago Ramos	Van Amersfoort Racing	+1.269	1	12
13	15	(Austria) Joshua Dufek	Hitech TGR	+1.293	13	13
14	19	(France) Alessandro Giusti	MP Motorsport	+1.337	14	14
15	24	(New Zealand) Louis Sharp	Rodin Motorsport	+1.345	15	15
16	12	(Bulgaria) Nikola Tsolov	Campos Racing	+1.491	16	16
17	7	(Netherlands) Laurens van Hoepen	ART Grand Prix	+1.656	17	17
18	23	(United Kingdom) Callum Voisin	Rodin Motorsport	+1.670	18	18
19	2	(Mexico) Noel León	Prema Racing	+1.743	19	19
20	26	(Spain) Javier Sagrera	AIX Racing	+1.819	20	20
21	9	(Australia) James Wharton	ART Grand Prix	+1.989	21	21
22	31	(Singapore) Christian Ho	DAMS Lucas Oil	+2.182	22	22
23	10	(Spain) Mari Boya	Campos Racing	+2.427	23	23
24	8	(Finland) Tuukka Taponen	ART Grand Prix	+2.575	24	24
25	16	(China) Gerrard Xie	Hitech TGR	+2.820	25	25
26	22	(Portugal) Ivan Domingues	Van Amersfoort Racing	+3.118	26	26
27	27	(Italy) Nicola Marinangeli	AIX Racing	+3.787	27	27
28	1	(Italy) Brando Badoer	Prema Racing	+6.516	28	28
107% time: 1:41.648 (+6.649)
—	29	(Italy) Nicola Lacorte	DAMS Lucas Oil	+14.363	29	29
—	18	(Spain) Bruno del Pino	MP Motorsport	+18.659	30	30

=== Sprint race ===
The sprint race was held on 15 March 2025, at 11:15 local time (UTC+11).

Pos.	No.	Driver	Team	Laps	Time/Gap	Grid	Pts.
1	21	(Mexico) Santiago Ramos	Van Amersfoort Racing	20	42:20.594	1	10
2	14	(Norway) Martinius Stenshorne	Hitech TGR	20	+0.408	4	9 (1)
3	25	(Poland) Roman Bilinski	Rodin Motorsport	20	+0.676	3	8
4	11	(Thailand) Tasanapol Inthraphuvasak	Campos Racing	20	+0.891	6	7
5	30	(Peru) Matías Zagazeta	DAMS Lucas Oil	20	+1.038	2	6
6	28	(Italy) Nikita Bedrin	AIX Racing	20	+1.217	9	5
7	20	(France) Théophile Naël	Van Amersfoort Racing	20	+1.406	10	4
8	12	(Bulgaria) Nikola Tsolov	Campos Racing	20	+1.738	16	3
9	23	(United Kingdom) Callum Voisin	Rodin Motorsport	20	+2.403	18	2
10	2	(Mexico) Noel León	Prema Racing	20	+2.944	19	1
11	3	(United States) Ugo Ugochukwu	Prema Racing	20	+3.851	5	
12	10	(Spain) Mari Boya	Campos Racing	20	+4.440	23	
13	8	(Finland) Tuukka Taponen	ART Grand Prix	20	+4.587	24	
14	31	(Singapore) Christian Ho	DAMS Lucas Oil	20	+5.897	22	
15	16	(China) Gerrard Xie	Hitech TGR	20	+7.116	25	
16	29	(Italy) Nicola Lacorte	DAMS Lucas Oil	20	+7.770	29	
17	24	(New Zealand) Louis Sharp	Rodin Motorsport	20	+9.033	15	
18	1	(Italy) Brando Badoer	Prema Racing	20	+9.730	28	
19	27	(Italy) Nicola Marinangeli	AIX Racing	20	+11.057	27	
20	22	(Portugal) Ivan Domingues	Van Amersfoort Racing	20	+11.461	26	
21	19	(France) Alessandro Giusti	MP Motorsport	20	+13.256^{1}	14	
22	15	(Austria) Joshua Dufek	Hitech TGR	20	+28.008^{2}	13	
DNF	4	(Denmark) Noah Strømsted	Trident	15	Retired	11	
DNF	18	(Spain) Bruno del Pino	MP Motorsport	15	Collision	30	
DNF	26	(Spain) Javier Sagrera	AIX Racing	15	Collision	20	
NC	17	(Germany) Tim Tramnitz	MP Motorsport	13	+7 laps	8	
DNF	7	(Netherlands) Laurens van Hoepen	ART Grand Prix	2	Collision	17	
DNF	5	(Brazil) Rafael Câmara	Trident	2	Collision	1	
DNF	9	(Australia) James Wharton	ART Grand Prix	2	^{3} Collision	21	
DNF	6	(Austria) Charlie Wurz	Trident	0	Retired	7	
Fastest lap set by (Norway) Martinius Stenshorne: 1:38.069 (lap 10)

Notes:

- ^1 – Alessandro Giusti originally finished eleventh, but was later given a ten-second time penalty for Safety Car infringement, subsequently dropping him down to 21st.
- ^2 – Joshua Dufek originally finished 18th, but later received a ten-second time penalty for leaving the track and gaining an advantage and another ten-second time penalty for causing a collision, dropping him down to 22nd in the final classification.
- ^3 – James Wharton was given a ten-second time penalty for causing a collision.

=== Feature race ===
The feature race was held on 16 March 2025, at 9:05 local time (UTC+11). Originally scheduled for 20 laps, the race was red-flagged on lap 18 due to heavy rain, and the results were taken from lap 16.

Pos.	No.	Driver	Team	Laps	Time/Gap	Grid	Pts.
1	5	(Brazil) Rafael Câmara	Trident	16	34:43.966	1	25 (2+1)
2	4	(Denmark) Noah Strømsted	Trident	16	+0.517	2	18
3	20	(France) Théophile Naël	Van Amersfoort Racing	16	+1.152	3	15
4	28	(Italy) Nikita Bedrin	AIX Racing	16	+1.732	4	12
5	17	(Germany) Tim Tramnitz	MP Motorsport	16	+2.298	5	10
6	6	(Austria) Charlie Wurz	Trident	16	+3.253	6	8
7	11	(Thailand) Tasanapol Inthraphuvasak	Campos Racing	16	+3.734	7	6
8	14	(Norway) Martinius Stenshorne	Hitech TGR	16	+4.923	9	4
9	25	(Poland) Roman Bilinski	Rodin Motorsport	16	+5.651	10	2
10	3	(United States) Ugo Ugochukwu	Prema Racing	16	+7.193	8	1
11	15	(Austria) Joshua Dufek	Hitech TGR	16	+8.347	13	
12	7	(Netherlands) Laurens van Hoepen	ART Grand Prix	16	+8.819	17	
13	2	(Mexico) Noel León	Prema Racing	16	+9.962	19	
14	24	(New Zealand) Louis Sharp	Rodin Motorsport	16	+11.671	15	
15	26	(Spain) Javier Sagrera	AIX Racing	16	+12.805	20	
16	21	(Mexico) Santiago Ramos	Van Amersfoort Racing	16	+13.867	12	
17	10	(Spain) Mari Boya	Campos Racing	16	+15.184	23	
18	16	(China) Gerrard Xie	Hitech TGR	16	+16.739	25	
19	22	(Portugal) Ivan Domingues	Van Amersfoort Racing	16	+18.926	26	
20	8	(Finland) Tuukka Taponen	ART Grand Prix	16	+19.276	24	
21	9	(Australia) James Wharton	ART Grand Prix	16	+20.297	21	
22	30	(Peru) Matías Zagazeta	DAMS Lucas Oil	16	+21.299^{1}	11	
23	18	(Spain) Bruno del Pino	MP Motorsport	16	+21.380	30	
24	29	(Italy) Nicola Lacorte	DAMS Lucas Oil	16	+22.252	29	
25	19	(France) Alessandro Giusti	MP Motorsport	16	+23.020	14	
26	1	(Italy) Brando Badoer	Prema Racing	16	+23.648	28	
27	27	(Italy) Nicola Marinangeli	AIX Racing	16	+25.079	27	
DNF	31	(Singapore) Christian Ho	DAMS Lucas Oil	12	Crash	22	
DNF	12	(Bulgaria) Nikola Tsolov	Campos Racing	0	Collision	16	
DNF	23	(United Kingdom) Callum Voisin	Rodin Motorsport	0	Collision	18	
Fastest lap set by (Brazil) Rafael Câmara: 1:49.748 (lap 11)

Notes:

- ^1 – Matías Zagazeta originally finished 13th, but was later given a ten-second time penalty for causing a collision, subsequently dropping him down to 22nd.

== Standings after the event ==
Drivers' Championship standings

Pos.	Driver	Points
1	(Brazil) Rafael Câmara	28
2	(France) Théophile Naël	19
3	(Denmark) Noah Strømsted	18
4	(Italy) Nikita Bedrin	17
5	(Norway) Martinius Stenshorne	14

Teams' Championship standings

Pos.	Team	Points
1	(Italy) Trident	54
2	(Netherlands) Van Amersfoort Racing	29
3	(United Arab Emirates) AIX Racing	17
4	(Spain) Campos Racing	16
5	(United Kingdom) Hitech TGR	14

- Note: Only the top five positions are included for both sets of standings.

== See also ==
- 2025 Australian Grand Prix
- 2025 Melbourne Formula 2 round

== Notes ==
Previous round: 2024 Monza Formula 3 round	FIA Formula 3 Championship; 2025 season	Next round: 2025 Sakhir Formula 3 round
Previous round: 2024 Melbourne Formula 3 round	Melbourne Formula 3 round	Next round: 2026 Melbourne Formula 3 round
