= Hồ (surname) =

Hồ (胡) is a Vietnamese surname. The name is transliterated as Hu in Chinese and Ho in Korean.

Ho is the anglicized variation of the surname Hồ. Not be confused with Ho surname in Chinese.

The Hồ 胡 clan which founded the Hồ dynasty in Vietnam originated in Zhejiang province of China.

== Notable people with the surname Hồ ==
- Hồ Xuân Hương (1772–1822), Vietnamese poet
- Hồ dynasty (1400–1406), rulers of Dai Viet

- Hồ Quý Ly (1336–1407?), ruler of Dai Viet
- Hồ Hán Thương (died 1407?), ruler of Dai Viet

- Hồ Tấn Quyền (1927–1963), Commander of the Republic of Vietnam Navy
- Hồ Lệ Thu (born 1973), Vietnamese pop singer
- Hồ Ngọc Hà (born 1984), Vietnamese model, pop singer, actress, and entertainer
- Don Hồ (born 1970), Vietnamese-American pop singer
- Hồ Thành Việt (1955–2003), Vietnamese-American computer entrepreneur

== See also ==
- Hồ (disambiguation)
