= Lim Ho (footballer) =

South Korean footballer

Personal information
- Date of birth: April 25, 1979 (age 47)
- Place of birth: Gumi, Gyeongbuk, South Korea
- Height: 1.82 m (5 ft 11 1/2 in)
- Position: Striker

Youth career
- Gyeongsang National University

Senior career*
Years	Team	Apps	(Gls)
2000–2001	Chunnam Dragons	0	(0)
2002–2003	National Police Agency		
2004	Gangneung City FC	18	(1)
2005	Daegu FC	6	(0)
2006–2007	Gangneung City FC	26	(14)
2008	Gumi Siltron	–	(–)
2009–2010	Goyang Kookmin Bank	34	(9)
- * Club domestic league appearances and goals as of 26 April 2009

- Lim Ho
- Hangul: 임호
- Hanja: 林虎
- RR: Im Ho
- MR: Im Ho

Lim Ho (Korean: 임호; born April 25, 1979) is a South Korean football player who recently played for Korea National League side Goyang Kookmin Bank.

== Football career ==
Lim started his football career with K-League side Chunnam Dragons. He did not play in league match for 2 years in Chunnam. Soon, He joined Police FC for military duty. Ending of military duty, he joined Gangneung City FC in National League. From 2005, he move again to K-League side Daegu FC as a defender. But 1 season later, he return to Gangneung that year, he awarded top scorer with 14 goals. He went through Amateur level Gumi Siltron and joined Korea National League side Goyang Kookmin Bank from 2009 season.

== Honours ==
=== Club ===
Gangneung City

- Korea National League Runner-up (1) : 2004

=== Individual ===
Gangneung City

- Korea National League Top scorer (1) : 2007 (14 goals)
- Korea National League Best Eleven (FW) : 2007

== Club career statistics ==
As of End of 2009 season

Club performance			League		Cup		League Cup		Total	
Season	Club	League	Apps	Goals	Apps	Goals	Apps	Goals	Apps	Goals
South Korea			League		KFA Cup		League Cup		Total	
2000	Chunnam Dragons	K-League	0	0			4	0		
2001	Chunnam Dragons	K-League	0	0			3	0		
2002	National Police Agency	R-League					-			
2003	National Police Agency	R-League			1	0	-			
2004	Gangneung City FC	K2 League	18	1	1	0	-		19	1
2005	Daegu FC	K-League	6	0	0	0	5	0	11	0
2006	Gangneung City FC	Korea National League	4	0	1	0	-		5	0
2007	Gangneung City FC	Korea National League	22	14	1	0	-		23	14
2008	Gumi Siltron	Amateur	-		2	3	-		2	3
2009	Goyang Kookmin Bank	Korea National League	19	6	1	0	-		20	6
Total	South Korea		69	21	7	3	12	0	88	24
Career total			69	21	7	3	12	0	88	24

Awards
Preceded by (South Korea) Kim Young-Hoo	N-League Top Scorer; 2007	Succeeded by (South Korea) Kim Young-Hoo
