= Christian Ho =

Singaporean racing driver (born 2006)

- 何宗宪
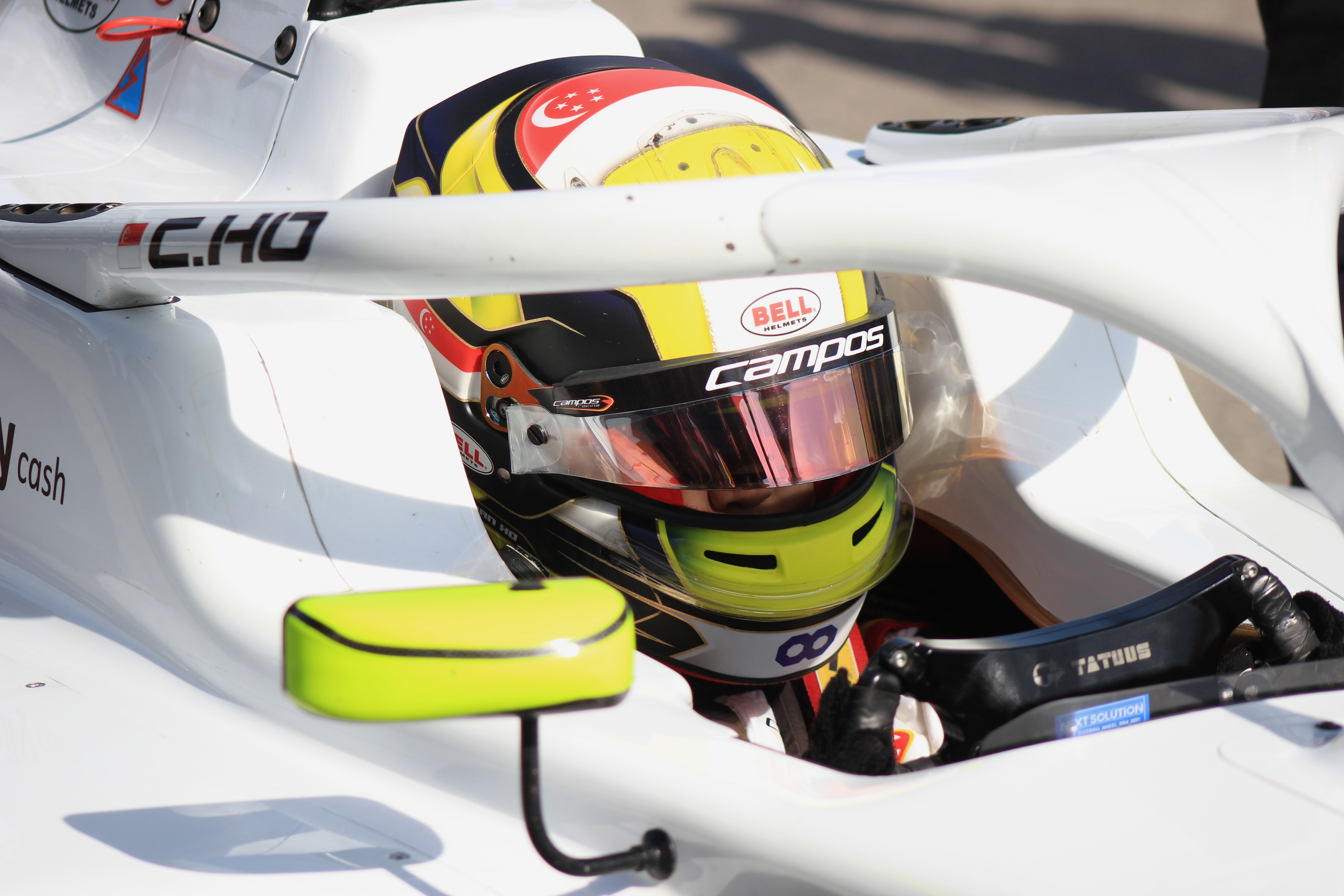
- Ho in 2023
- Born: Christian Ho Zong Sean; 31 October 2006 (age 20); Singapore
- Nationality: (Singapore) Singaporean

FIA Formula 3 Championship career
- Debut season: 2025
- Former teams: DAMS Lucas Oil, Rodin Motorsport
- Starts: 35
- Wins: 0
- Podiums: 0
- Poles: 0
- Fastest laps: 0
- Best finish: 22nd in 2025

Previous series
- 2024; 2022–2023; 2022: Eurocup-3; F4 Spanish; F4 UAE

Championship titles
- 2024: Eurocup-3
- Statistics up to date as of 10 September 2026.

Chinese name
- Traditional Chinese: 何宗憲
- Simplified Chinese: 何宗宪
Transcriptions
Standard Mandarin
- Hanyu Pinyin: Hé Zōngxiàn

Christian Ho Zong Sean (Chinese: 何宗宪; pinyin: Hé Zōngxiàn; born 31 October 2006) is a Singaporean racing driver who last competed in the FIA Formula 3 Championship for Rodin Motorsport.

Ho is the 2023 F4 Spanish vice-champion and 2024 Eurocup-3 champion. He was a member of the Sauber Karting Team from 2019 to 2021.

== Career ==
=== Karting (2017–2021) ===
In 2017 and 2018, Ho competed in his first WSK events in the 60 Mini category. After a year in OK Junior karts, he was the first runner up in the 2019 German Junior Kart Championship with Ricky Flynn Motorsport. He became runner-up to Kajus Siksnelis during the 2019 Karting Academy Trophy. During that year, he also took part in the 2019 Karting World Championship, in which he ranked 11th. In 2020, he finished third in the WSK Champions Cup in the OK Junior category. He also took third place in the IAME Asia Cup, in the senior category.

In September 2021, Ho became the latest signing to Nicolas Todt’s All Road Management stable.

=== Formula 4 (2022–2023) ===
==== Formula 4 UAE ====
Ho made his single-seater debut in the 2022 Formula 4 UAE Championship with MP Motorsport during the third weekend of the series, in preparation for his upcoming main campaign. He finished tenth in his first race and two races later, in fifth. Two more tenth places saw him place 21st in the standings.

==== Spanish Formula 4 ====
===== 2022 =====
Ho continued with MP Motorsport for the 2022 F4 Spanish Championship. In the first race, he scored a point in tenth place. His results improved towards the end of the season, scoring two fourth places and a fifth place. Ho ended the championship in 13th place with 50 points.

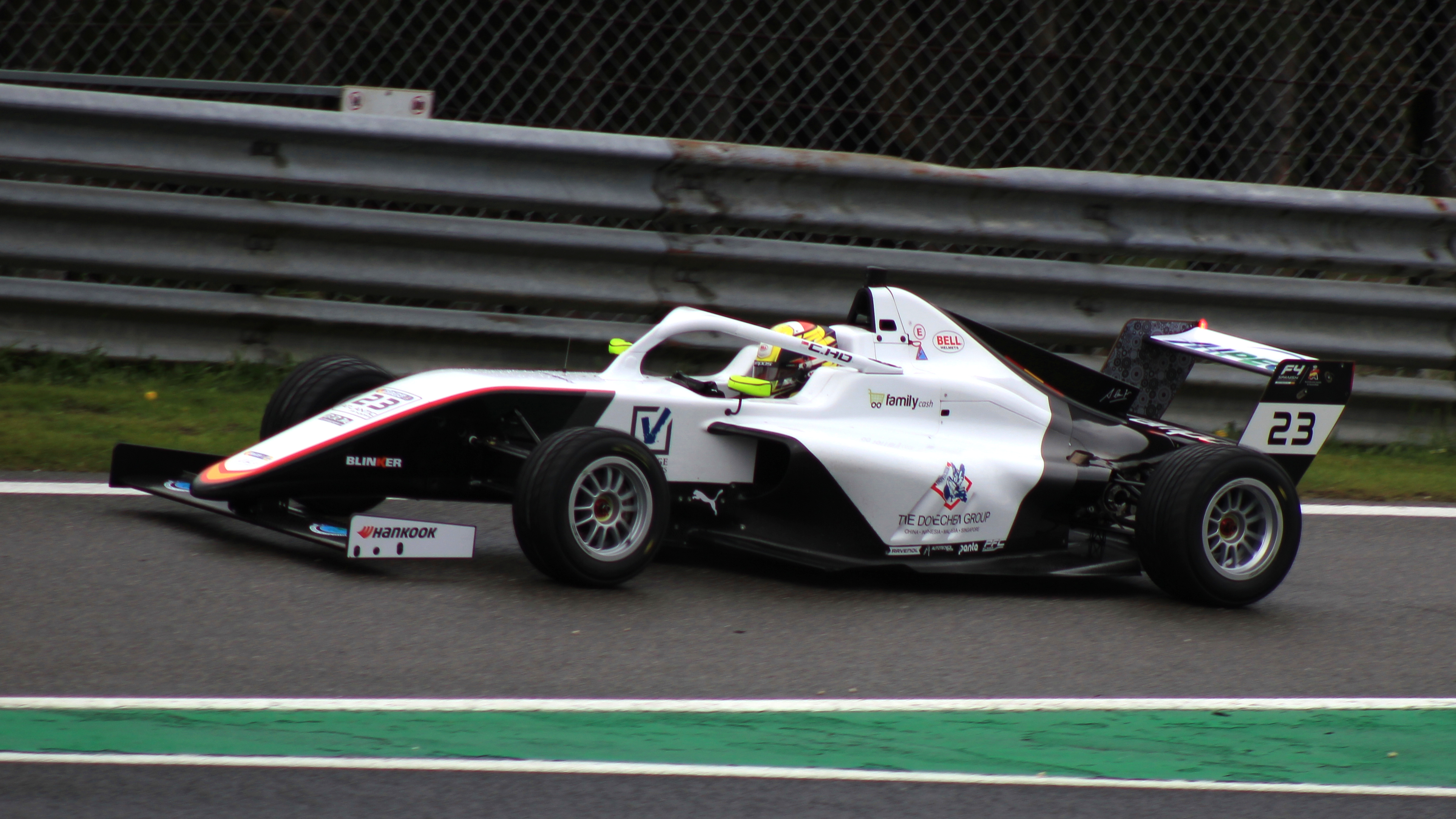
Ho racing at Spa-Francorchamps during the 2023 F4 Spanish Championship.

===== 2023 =====
Ho remained in Spanish F4 for 2023, but switched to Campos Racing. Ho emerged as a contender early on, taking a double podium in Spa-Francorchamps. After a double pole the next round in Aragón, the win was taken away after a track limits penalty in the first race. However, he redeemed himself with a commanding win in Race 2, taking his maiden single-seater victory. Following that, Ho began a run of five podiums in a row starting from Jerez to Valencia, which included two poles. He then took his second win in the Valencia final race. He was at his best during the season finale in Barcelona, taking pole for all three races. Ho dominated during the races, proceeding to take all three wins. Ho finished the season as vice-champion, having taken five wins, seven poles and 291 points.

=== Formula Regional (2024, 2026) ===
==== 2024: Eurocup-3 champion ====
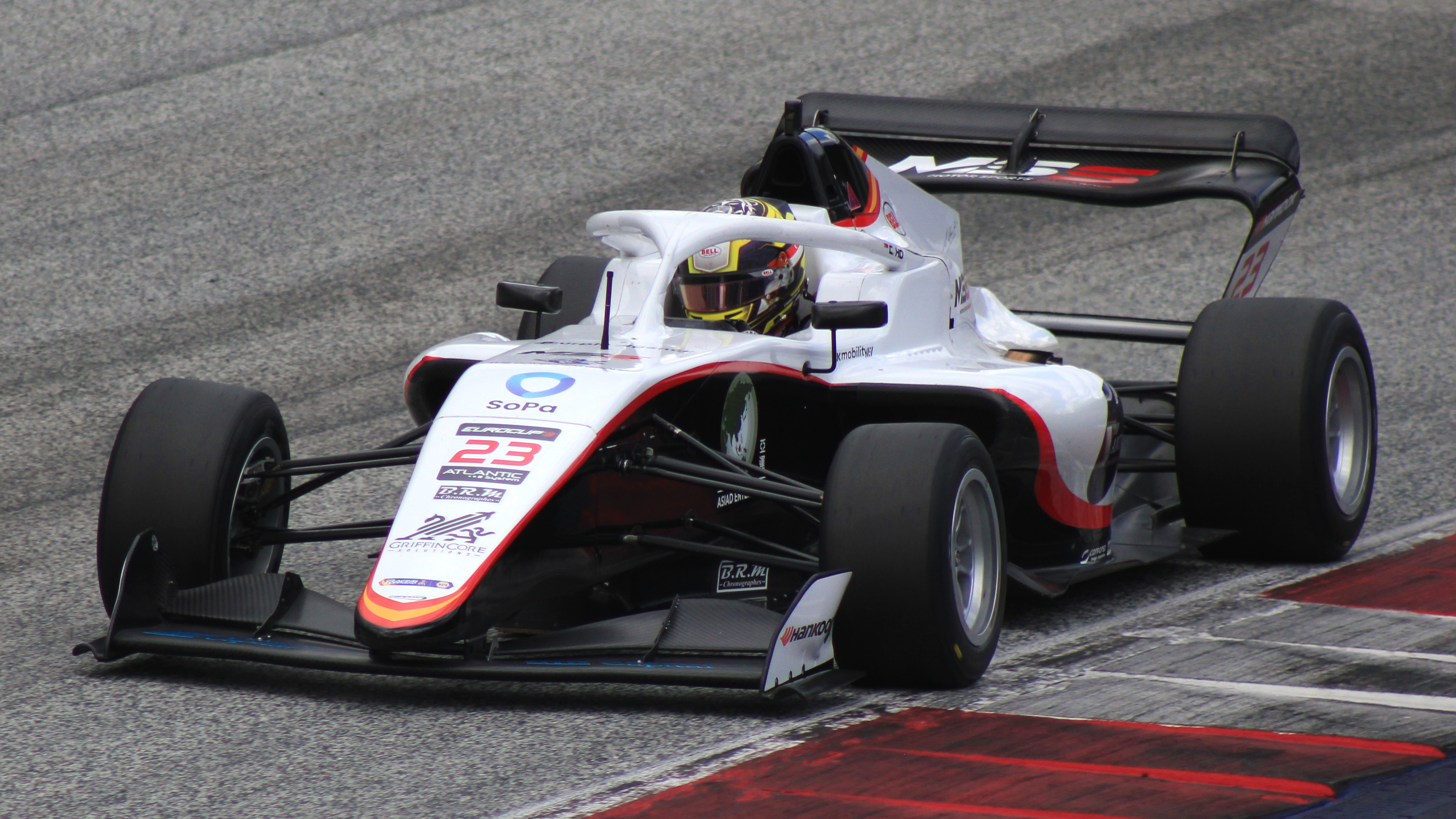
Ho racing at the Red Bull Ring during the 2024 Eurocup-3 season.

Ho was promoted to Eurocup-3 for 2024, remaining with Campos Racing. A poor start to the season saw him with only a fourth place in the first two rounds. However, he would claim his maiden wins in Portimão, although a suspension failure prevented a clean sweep. He took the standings lead with two poles, a win and a podium in Paul Ricard. However, despite two additional podiums in the next two rounds in Zandvoort and Aragón, title rival Javier Sagrera won thrice, leaving Ho losing the lead of the standings. Ho won the first race in Jerez and a fifth in the second race left him an outside chance for the title, trailing Sagrera by 26 points. However, Ho rebounded in the Barcelona finale with second in the first race and winning the second race. At that time, it meant Ho ended as vice-champion, losing out to Sagrera by two points. However three months later, following a review of results, Ho was awarded the win for the first Barcelona race after an illegal overtake off-track for original winner Emerson Fittipaldi Jr. This meant Ho gained seven points to be crowned champion, five points ahead of Sagrera.

==== 2026: Middle East cameo ====
In preparation for his 2026 Formula 3 campaign, Ho joined MP Motorsport to contest the first two rounds of the Formula Regional Middle East Trophy.

=== FIA Formula 3 (2025–2026) ===
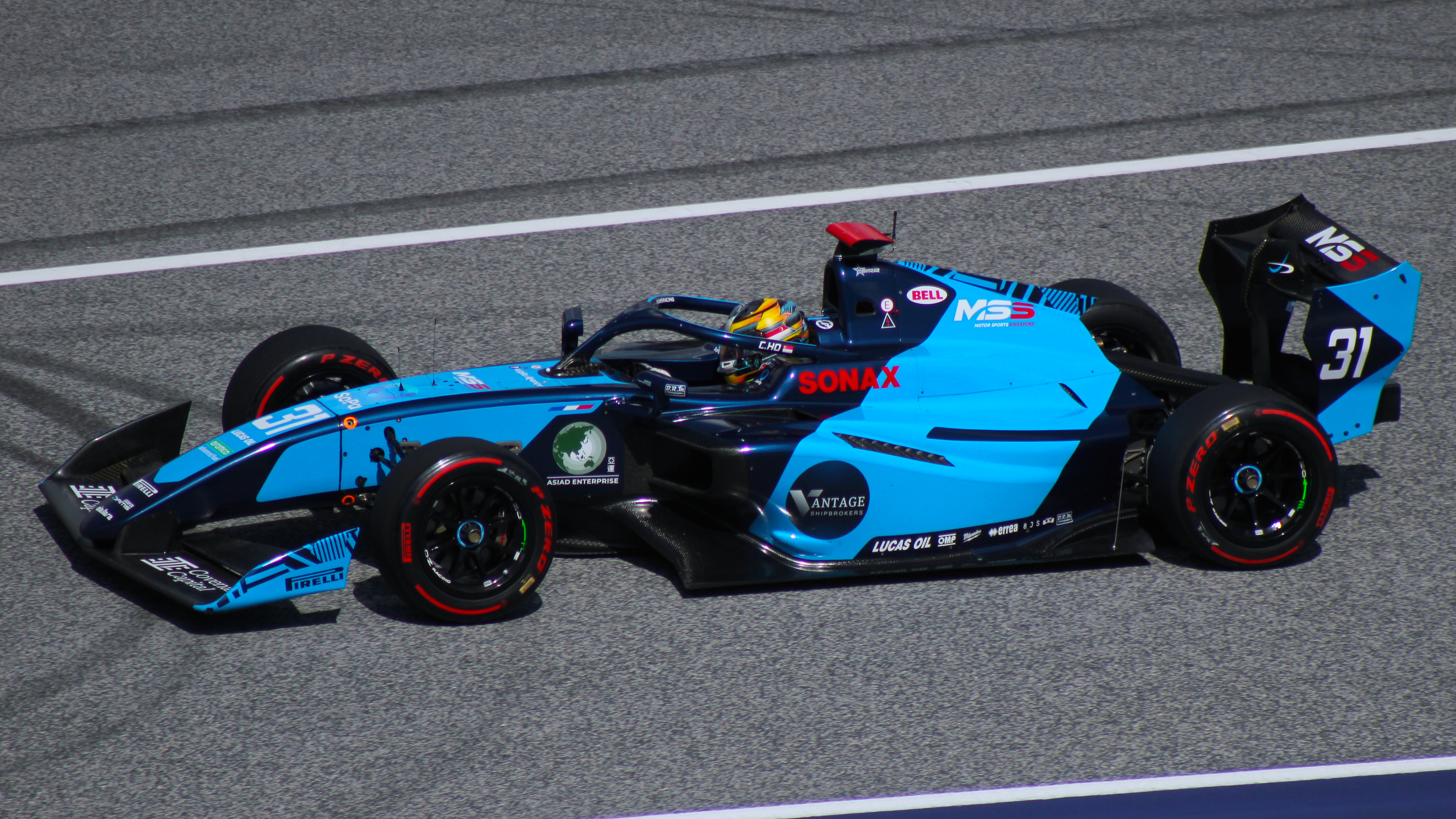
Ho driving the Dallara F3 2025 during the 2025 Spielberg Formula 3 round

==== 2025 ====
In 2025, Ho stepped up to FIA Formula 3 with new team DAMS Lucas Oil, alongside Matías Zagazeta and Alpine-backed Nicola Lacorte. Ho became the first Singaporean driver to secure a seat on the FIA Formula 3 Championship grid. He had a shaky start to the season in Melbourne with a crash in the feature race, but secured a fourth place starting spot in Bahrain; he took double points with eighth and tenth in the races. Following a series of rounds where he lacked pace with the car, Ho returned to the points in Silverstone after qualifying in the top-12, and managed to place sixth in the sprint and fifth in the feature. This would prove to be his last points finish of the season, as Ho ended up 22nd in the standings with 17 points, ahead of Zagazeta and Lacorte.

==== 2026 ====
Ho continued in Formula 3 for 2026, moving over to Rodin Motorsport, partnering former Spanish F4 rival Pedro Clerot and Brando Badoer. He was replaced for the final round in Madrid by Niccolò Maccagnani.

=== Hiatus from racing ===
After leaving FIA Formula 3 in September 2026, Ho announced that he would put his racing career on hold to fulfil the mandatory two years of national service in Singapore.

== Personal life ==
Ho was born in Singapore, studied at Anglo-Chinese School Primary but emigrated to Italy a year before the Primary Six Primary School Leaving Examination to pursue a career in karting.

== Karting record ==
=== Karting career summary ===
| Season | Series | Team | Position |
|---|---|---|---|
| 2017 | WSK Final Cup — 60 Mini | | 19th |
| 2017 | 46° Trofeo Delle Industrie — 60 Mini | Gamoto ASD | 16th |
| 2018 | Andrea Margutti Trophy — 60 Mini | Baby Race Driver Academy | 9th |
| 2019 | WSK Final Cup — OKJ | Sauber Karting Team | 16th |
| 2019 | WSK Open Cup — OKJ | Sauber Karting Team | 12th |
| 2019 | IAME International Final — X30 Junior | Ricky Flynn Motorsport | 14th |
| 2019 | German Junior Kart Championship | Ricky Flynn Motorsport | 2nd |
| 2019 | CIK-FIA European Championship — OKJ | Ricky Flynn Motorsport | 33rd |
| 2019 | CIK-FIA World Championship — OKJ | Ricky Flynn Motorsport | 11th |
| 2019 | WSK Euro Series — OKJ | Ricky Flynn Motorsport | 15th |
| 2019 | WSK Champions Cup — OKJ | Ricky Flynn Motorsport | 16th |
| 2019 | WSK Super Master Series — OKJ | Ricky Flynn Motorsport | 19th |
| 2019 | 24° South Garda Winter Cup — OKJ | Ricky Flynn Motorsport | 9th |
| 2019 | IAME Series Asia – Junior | I.S Racing | 11th |
| 2019 | CIK-FIA Karting Academy Trophy | | 2nd |
| 2020 | WSK Euro Series — OKJ | Sauber Karting Team | 16th |
| 2020 | 25° South Garda Winter Cup — OKJ | Sauber Karting Team | 18th |
| 2020 | WSK Super Master Series — OKJ | Sauber Karting Team | 16th |
| 2020 | FIA Karting World Championship — OKJ | Sauber Karting Team | 4th |
| 2020 | WSK Champions Cup — OKJ | Sauber Karting Team | 3rd |
| 2020 | IAME Asia Cup — Senior | I.S Racing | 3rd |
| 2021 | WSK Champions Cup — OK | Sauber Karting Team | 23rd |
| 2021 | WSK Super Master Series — OK | | 24th |

=== Complete Macao International Kart Grand Prix results ===
| Year | Series | Team | Class | Pre-Final | Final |
|---|---|---|---|---|---|
| 2015 | Asian Karting Open Championship | Kartmaster Drakkar | Mini ROK | ? | ? |
| 2016 | Asian Karting Open Championship | Kartmaster Racing Team | Mini ROK | ? | ? |
| 2017 | Asian Karting Open Championship | IS Racing Team | Mini ROK | 1st | 3rd |
| 2018 | Asian Karting Open Championship | IS Racing Team | Formula 125 Junior Open | ? | 11th |

=== Complete Macau Asia Karting Festival results ===
| Year | Series | Team | Class | Final |
|---|---|---|---|---|
| 2017 | Asian Karting Open Championship | IS Racing Team | Mini ROK | WD |
| 2018 | Asian Karting Open Championship | IS Racing Team | Mini ROK | ? |

== Racing record ==
=== Racing career summary ===
| Season | Series | Team | Races | Wins | Poles | F/Laps | Podiums | Points | Position |
|---|---|---|---|---|---|---|---|---|---|
| 2022 | Formula 4 UAE Championship | MP Motorsport | 12 | 0 | 0 | 0 | 0 | 13 | 21st |
| 2022 | F4 Spanish Championship | MP Motorsport | 21 | 0 | 0 | 0 | 0 | 50 | 13th |
| 2023 | F4 Spanish Championship | Campos Racing | 21 | 5 | 7 | 6 | 13 | 291 | **2nd** |
| 2024 | Eurocup-3 | Campos Racing | 16 | 6 | 6 | 5 | 9 | 255 | **1st** |
| 2025 | FIA Formula 3 Championship | DAMS Lucas Oil | 19 | 0 | 0 | 0 | 0 | 17 | 22nd |
| 2026 | Formula Regional Middle East Trophy | MP Motorsport | 6 | 1 | 0 | 1 | 2 | 44 | 12th |
| 2026 | FIA Formula 3 Championship | Rodin Motorsport | 16 | 0 | 0 | 0 | 0 | 2 | 26th |

=== Complete Formula 4 UAE Championship results ===
(key) (Races in bold indicate pole position) (Races in italics indicate fastest lap)

| Year | Team | 1 | 2 | 3 | 4 | 5 | 6 | 7 | 8 | 9 | 10 | 11 | 12 | 13 | 14 | 15 | 16 | 17 | 18 | 19 | 20 | DC | Points |
|---|---|---|---|---|---|---|---|---|---|---|---|---|---|---|---|---|---|---|---|---|---|---|---|
| 2022 | MP Motorsport | YAS1; 1 | YAS1; 2 | YAS1; 3 | YAS1; 4 | DUB1; 1 | DUB1; 2 | DUB1; 3 | DUB1; 4 | DUB2; 1; 10 | DUB2; 2; 24 | DUB2; 3; 5 | DUB2; 4; 27† | DUB3; 1; 12 | DUB3; 2; 10 | DUB3; 3; 16 | DUB3; 4; 10 | YAS2; 1; 20 | YAS2; 2; 16 | YAS2; 3; 11 | YAS2; 4 Ret | 21st | 13 |

=== Complete F4 Spanish Championship results ===
(key) (Races in bold indicate pole position) (Races in italics indicate fastest lap)

| Year | Team | 1 | 2 | 3 | 4 | 5 | 6 | 7 | 8 | 9 | 10 | 11 | 12 | 13 | 14 | 15 | 16 | 17 | 18 | 19 | 20 | 21 | DC | Points |
|---|---|---|---|---|---|---|---|---|---|---|---|---|---|---|---|---|---|---|---|---|---|---|---|---|
| 2022 | MP Motorsport | ALG; 1; 10 | ALG; 2; 12 | ALG; 3; 27† | JER; 1; 9 | JER; 2; 14 | JER; 3; 14 | CRT; 1; 16 | CRT; 2; 15 | CRT; 3; 7 | SPA; 1; 9 | SPA; 2; 14 | SPA; 3; 18 | ARA; 1 Ret | ARA; 2; 9 | ARA; 3; 10 | NAV; 1; 14 | NAV; 2; 14 | NAV; 3; 5 | CAT; 1; 4 | CAT; 2; 7 | CAT; 3; 4 | 13th | 50 |
| 2023 | Campos Racing | SPA; 1; 2 | SPA; 2; 26 | SPA; 3; 3 | **ARA**; **1**; 2 | **ARA**; **2**; 1 | ARA; 3 Ret | NAV; 1; 4 | NAV; 2; 4 | NAV; 3 Ret | JER; 1; 6 | JER; 2; 8 | JER; 3; 3 | EST; 1; 3 | EST; 2; 3 | EST; 3; 2 | **CRT**; **1**; 3 | CRT; 2; 6 | CRT; 3; 1 | **CAT**; **1**; 1 | **CAT**; **2**; 1 | **CAT**; **3**; 1 | 2nd | 291 |

=== Complete Eurocup-3 results ===
(key) (Races in bold indicate pole position) (Races in italics indicate fastest lap)

| Year | Team | 1 | 2 | 3 | 4 | 5 | 6 | 7 | 8 | 9 | 10 | 11 | 12 | 13 | 14 | 15 | 16 | 17 | DC | Points |
|---|---|---|---|---|---|---|---|---|---|---|---|---|---|---|---|---|---|---|---|---|
| 2024 | Campos Racing | SPA; 1; 22† | SPA; 2 C | RBR; 1 Ret | **RBR**; **2**; 4 | **POR**; **1**; 1 | POR; 2; 1 | POR; 3; 21† | **LEC**; **1**; 2 | **LEC**; **2**; 1 | ZAN; 1; 2 | ZAN; 2; 5 | ARA; 1; 2 | ARA; 2; 9 | JER; 1; 1 | JER; 2; 5 | CAT; 1; 1 | **CAT**; **2**; 1 | 1st | 255 |

=== Complete FIA Formula 3 Championship results ===
(key) (Races in bold indicate pole position) (Races in italics indicate fastest lap)

| Year | Entrant | 1 | 2 | 3 | 4 | 5 | 6 | 7 | 8 | 9 | 10 | 11 | 12 | 13 | 14 | 15 | 16 | 17 | 18 | 19 | 20 | DC | Points |
|---|---|---|---|---|---|---|---|---|---|---|---|---|---|---|---|---|---|---|---|---|---|---|---|
| 2025 | DAMS Lucas Oil | MEL; SPR; 15 | MEL; FEA; Ret | BHR; SPR; 8 | BHR; FEA; 10 | IMO; SPR; 21 | IMO; FEA; 21 | MON; SPR; 15 | MON; FEA; 13 | CAT; SPR; 11 | CAT; FEA; 14 | RBR; SPR; Ret | RBR; FEA; 24 | SIL; SPR; 6 | SIL; FEA; 5 | SPA; SPR; 28 | SPA; FEA; C | HUN; SPR; 20 | HUN; FEA; 20 | MNZ; SPR; 23 | MNZ; FEA; 13 | 22nd | 17 |
| 2026 | Rodin Motorsport | MEL; SPR; 18 | MEL; FEA; 22 | MON; SPR; Ret | MON; FEA; 16 | CAT; SPR; 26 | CAT; FEA; 28 | RBR; SPR; 22 | RBR; FEA; 16 | SIL; SPR; 30 | SIL; FEA; 26 | SPA; SPR; 11 | SPA; FEA; 24 | HUN; SPR; 22 | HUN; FEA; 9 | MNZ; SPR; 18 | MNZ; FEA; 13 | MAD; SPR | MAD; FEA1 | MAD; FEA2 | | 26th | 2 |

=== Complete Formula Regional Middle East Trophy results ===
(key) (Races in bold indicate pole position) (Races in italics indicate fastest lap)

| Year | Entrant | 1 | 2 | 3 | 4 | 5 | 6 | 7 | 8 | 9 | 10 | 11 | 12 | DC | Points |
|---|---|---|---|---|---|---|---|---|---|---|---|---|---|---|---|
| 2026 | MP Motorsport | YMC1; 1; 8 | YMC1; 2; 1 | YMC1; 3; 3 | YMC2; 1; 17 | YMC2; 2; 22 | YMC2; 3; 11 | DUB; 1 | DUB; 2 | DUB; 3 | LUS; 1 | LUS; 2 | LUS; 3 | 12th | 44 |

== Notes ==
Sporting positions
| Preceded by Esteban Masson | Eurocup-3; Champion; 2024 | Succeeded by Mattia Colnaghi |
