= Hou =

Hou or HOU may refer to:

== Places ==
- Hou (Odder Municipality), a town in Denmark
- Hellenic Open University, in Patras, Greece
- Hounslow railway station (National Rail station code: HOU), London, England
- A common abbreviation for the U.S. city of Houston, Texas and its major professional sports teams:
  - Houston Astros, the city's Major League Baseball team
  - Houston Rockets, the city's National Basketball Association team
  - Houston Texans, the city's National Football League team
- HOU, IATA code for William P. Hobby Airport

== Chinese culture ==
- Hou (surname), Chinese surname
- Hou (currency) (Chinese: 毫), a unit of currency in Greater China
- Hou (title) (Chinese: 后), a title in ancient China
- Denglong (mythology) or Hou (Chinese: 犼), a Chinese legendary creature

== Other uses ==
- -hou, a place-name element
- Hands-On Universe, an educational program
- Hero of Ukraine

== See also ==
- Ho (disambiguation)
