= Sornsawan Ho =

Elected volunteer member of the Asia-Pacific Regional Scout Committee of the World Organization of the Scout Movement
- In office 2012–2015

Sornsawan "Opal" Ho from Thailand (born January 18, 1993) served as an elected volunteer member of the Asia-Pacific Regional Scout Committee of the World Organization of the Scout Movement (WOSM) from 2012 to 2015, chairperson of the Young Adult Members Group.

She has been active in Scouting since 2007, and was one of the organizers of the 8th Asia-Pacific Regional Scout Youth Forum in Suncheon, Korea in 2015. She is now working on developing a Scout campsite in Thailand into a Scout Center of Excellence for Nature and Environment (SCENES), one of World Scouting's environmental initiatives.

She attended Suankularb Wittayalai Nonthaburi School, studies law at the Faculty of Law of Thammasat University, and serves as President of the Thailand International Young Scout Club.
