= Hồ =

Hồ is a Vietnamese word. It may refer to:

- Hồ (surname), a Vietnamese surname
- Hồ dynasty of Vietnam
- Hồ, Bắc Ninh, a township and capital of Thuận Thành District
