= Ho, Denmark =

Ho
- Village
- Location within Region of Southern Denmark
- Coordinates: 55°33′13″N 8°13′47″E
- Country: Denmark
- Region: Southern Denmark (Syddanmark)
- Municipality: Varde

Population
  - Total: 200

Ho is a village in southwestern Jutland in the Varde Municipality, in Region of Southern Denmark. Many tourists, especially Germans, visit the village primarily because of the nature of the area. It is 7 kilometers from Blåvand, 11 kilometers from Oksbøl and 32 from Esbjerg.

== Etymology ==
Ho is linked to Ho Bugt. Ho is derived from Hõi, which means trough or cart. Ho can therefore be translated into "the fjord that looks like a trough".

== See also ==
- List of short place names

== Bibliography ==
- Ploug, Mariann (2009). Ho Ladeplads (in Danish). Denmark: Sjæk´len. pp. 23–31.
