= Ho (Korean name) =

Ho (Korean: 호) is a Korean family name and a Korean given name.

== Family name ==
As a family name, Ho may be written with three different hanja 扈, 胡, and 鎬. Those with the family name meaning "retinue" (扈) may belong to one of four different bongwan:

- Naju, Jeollanam-do
- Boan, Buan, Jeollabuk-do
- Baekcheon, Sacheon, Gyeongsangnam-do
- Jeonju, Jeollabuk-do

The 2000 South Korean census found 6,106 people with these family names.

People with this family name include:

- Ho In-soo, South Korean Catholic priest
- Jessica Ho (stage name Jessi, born 1988), Korean American rapper, singer, television presenter
- Ho Jun-seok (born 1969), South Korean politician

== Given name ==
People with the given name Ho include:

- Im Ho (born 1970), South Korean actor
- Kim Ho (born 1944), South Korean football manager
- Lim Ho (born 1979), South Korean football striker (Korea National League)

== See also ==
- List of Korean given names
