= H0 =

H0 (H followed by zero), H_{0}, or H00 may refer to:

- HO scale, used in rail transport modelling
- Higgs boson, in physics, symbol H^{0}
- Hammett acidity function, in chemistry, H_{0}
- Hubble constant, in cosmology, H_{0}
- Null hypothesis, in statistics, often denoted H_{0}
- HMS Comet (H00), a British and later Canadian warship
- Stye, a bacterial infection of the eyelid, ICD-10 code H00

== See also ==
- 0H (disambiguation)
- Ho (disambiguation)
