= Monaco Grand Prix support races =

Historical overview article

The Circuit de Monaco is the venue for the support races.

The Formula One Monaco Grand Prix has had a support race in many of its editions, the longest running of which was the Monaco Grand Prix Formula Three, held each year from 1964 to 1997, and again in 2005. It replaced the Monaco Grand Prix Formula Junior. The Formula Three race was replaced by Formula 3000 for 1998, which would then become the GP2 Series and then the Formula 2.

The Coupe Prince Ranier was held once in the 1930s, and the Prix de Monte Carlo held twice in the 1950s.

== History ==
=== Coupe Prince Ranier ===
The first support race for the Monaco Grand Prix was held in 1936 as a race for 1.5 litre voiturettes, and was won by Prince Bira in an ERA. The Coupe Prince Ranier was repeated the next year but for sports cars instead, won by Laury Schell in a Delahaye. With the Monaco Grand Prix not held in 1938 and the interruption of World War 2, the Coupe Prince Ranier was not held again.

=== Prix de Monte Carlo ===
After the first Monaco Grand Prix after the War in 1948, a motorcycle race was held, but this was never repeated. At the next Monaco Grand Prix, in 1950, was the first Prix de Monaco held for 500cc Formula Three cars, and was won by Stirling Moss. After another one-year hiatus the Monaco Grand Prix returned in 1952 now as a sports car race, with the Prix de Monte Carlo held for sports cars up to 2 litres. The Monaco Grand Prix was placed on hiatus again until 1955, but the Prix de Monte Carlo would not return.

=== Monaco Grand Prix Formula Junior/Monaco Grand Prix Formula Three ===
The race became a permanent event first as a Formula Junior race in 1959. Formula Junior was replaced by Formula Two and Formula Three in 1964 and the support race was then held with Formula Three cars. A European Formula Three Championship was introduced in 1974 but the Monaco race was not part of it and instead attracted drivers from the various national and international F3 series held in Europe.

After the end of the European Championship it was one of the two unofficial European F3 races along with the Masters of Formula 3. The F3 race was cancelled after 1997. The F3 race was resurrected once again in 2005 as a part of the Formula Three Euroseries, but this championship never returned as it had mostly followed the DTM calendar.

Three drivers have won the Monaco Grand Prix Formula Three support race twice: Peter Arundell for Lotus in 1961 and 1962, Alain Ferté for Oreca in 1981 and 1982 and Gianantonio Pacchioni for Tatuus in 1993 and Prema Powerteam in 1995.

The most successful team in the event is Oreca, who have won the event six times: Alain Ferté in 1981 and 1982, Michel Ferté in 1983, Pierre-Henri Raphanel in 1985, Yannick Dalmas in 1986 and Laurent Aïello in 1990. The next most successful is Martini with four wins (1973, 1977, 1979 and 1980), while Lotus have three (1961, 1962 and 1971). Matra, Prema Powerteam and Bertram Schäfer Racing each have two wins.

Martini chassis won the event ten times between 1973 and 1986, the most of any manufacturer. Dallara have taken eight victories since 1988, while Lotus have four, Cooper have three, and Matra, Tecno, March, Ralt and Reynard all have two.

=== Formula 3000/GP2/Formula 2 ===
Formula Three was replaced by an International Formula 3000 race in 1998. This was held until 2004, with Formula 3000 replaced by the GP2 Series in 2005. The GP2 Series would itself become the FIA Formula 2 Championship in 2017, and Monaco has had a round every year, except in 2020.

=== Other races ===
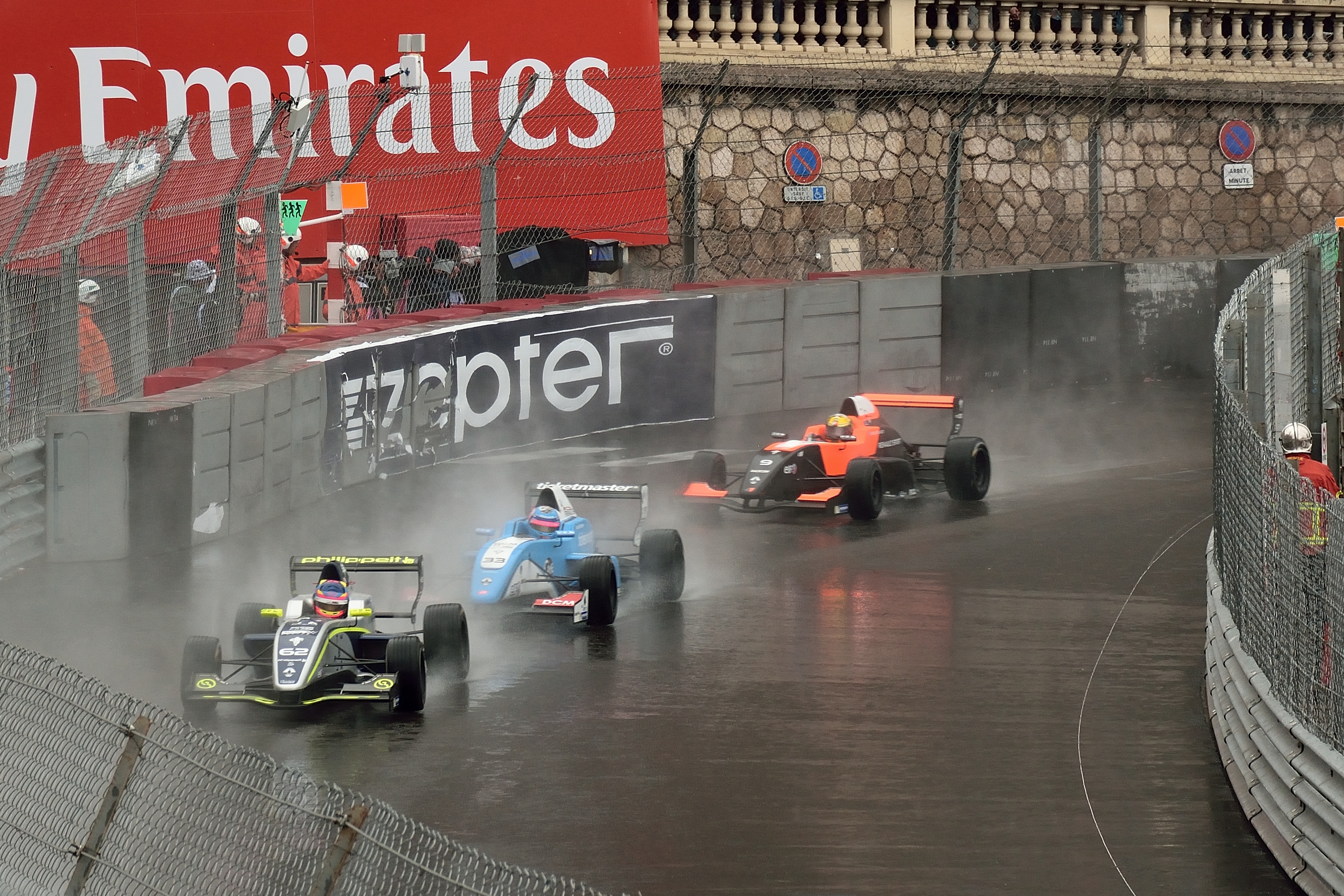
A Formula Renault Eurocup race in 2016

Formula Renault has held rounds at the Monaco Grand Prix since 2003, first with the Formula Renault V6 Eurocup, which was replaced by the Formula Renault 3.5 Series from 2005–2015. More recently the more junior 2 litre Formula Renault series have held races at Monaco. In 2021 this was rebranded as the Formula Regional European Championship.

The GP3 Series made a one-off appearance in 2012.

The Porsche Supercup has supported all Monaco Grands Prix since its inception in 1993.

The FIA Formula 3 Championship made its debut in 2023, replacing the Formula Regional European Championship.

== Winners ==
=== Coupe Prince Ranier ===
Year	Winner	Manufacturer	Class	Results
1936	(Thailand) B. Bira	ERA	Voiturette	Results
1937	(France) Laury Schell	Delahaye	Sports Cars	Results

=== Monaco motorcycle Grand Prix ===
Year	Winner	Manufacturer	Class	Results
1948	(Italy) Aldo Brini	Gilera	500cc	Results

=== Prix de Monte Carlo ===
Year	Winner	Manufacturer	Class	Results
1950	(United Kingdom) Stirling Moss	Cooper T11-JAP	Formula Three	Results
1951	Not held			
1952	(France) Robert Manzon	Gordini	Sports Cars up to 2 litres	Results

=== Monaco Grand Prix Formula Three (and Formula Junior) ===
Note: A pink background denotes a Formula Junior race.

Year	Winner	Entrant	Car	Engine	Results
1959	(Switzerland) Michael May	(Switzerland) Michael May	Stanguellini	Fiat	Results
1960	(United Kingdom) Henry Taylor	(United Kingdom) Ken Tyrrell	Cooper T52	BMC	Results
1961	(United Kingdom) Peter Arundell	(United Kingdom) Team Lotus	Lotus 20	Ford	Results
1962	(United Kingdom) Peter Arundell	(United Kingdom) Team Lotus	Lotus 22	Ford	Results
1963	(United Kingdom) Richard Attwood	(United Kingdom) Midland Racing Partnership	Lola Mk5A	Ford	Results
1964	(United Kingdom) Jackie Stewart	(United Kingdom) Tyrrell	Cooper T72	BMC	Results
1965	(United States) Peter Revson	(United Kingdom) Ron Harris Racing Division	Lotus 35	Ford	Results
1966	(France) Jean-Pierre Beltoise	(France) Matra Sports	Matra MS5	Ford	Results
1967	(France) Henri Pescarolo	(France) Matra Sports	Matra MS6	Ford	Results
1968	(France) Jean-Pierre Jaussaud	(France) Ecurie Arnold	Tecno 68	Ford	Results
1969	(Sweden) Ronnie Peterson	(Italy) Squadra Robardie	Tecno 69	Ford	Results
1970	(United Kingdom) Tony Trimmer	(United Kingdom) Race Cars International	Brabham BT28	Ford	Results
1971	(Australia) David Walker	(United Kingdom) Gold Leaf Team Lotus	Lotus 69	Ford	Results
1972	(France) Patrick Depailler	(France) Societé des Automobiles Alpine	Alpine A364	Renault	Results
1973	(France) Jacques Laffite	BP France	Martini MK12	Ford	Results
1974	(United Kingdom) Tom Pryce	(United Kingdom) Ippokampos Racing	March 743	Ford	Results
1975	(Italy) Renzo Zorzi (Note: While Zorzi won the race, it could be noted that Tony Brise and Alex Ribeiro, both ahead of Zorzi, collided into each other on the last lap.)	(Italy) Scuderia Mirabella Mille Miglia	GRD 374	Lancia	Results
1976	(Italy) Bruno Giacomelli	(United Kingdom) March Racing	March 763	Toyota	Results
1977	(France) Didier Pironi	(France) Ecurie Elf	Martini MK21	Toyota	Results
1978	(Italy) Elio de Angelis	(Italy) Racing Team Everest	Chevron B38	Toyota	Results
1979	(France) Alain Prost	(France) Ecurie Elf	Martini MK27	Renault	Results
1980	(Italy) Mauro Baldi	(France) Automobiles Martini	Martini MK31	Toyota	Results
1981	(France) Alain Ferté	(France) BP Racing	Martini MK34	Alfa Romeo	Results
1982	(France) Alain Ferté	(France) Total	Martini MK37	Alfa Romeo	Results
1983	(France) Michel Ferté	(France) Oreca	Martini MK39	Alfa Romeo	Results
1984	(Italy) Ivan Capelli	(Italy) Enzo Coloni Racing	Martini MK42	Alfa Romeo	Results
1985	(France) Pierre-Henri Raphanel	(France) Oreca	Martini MK45	Alfa Romeo	Results
1986	(France) Yannick Dalmas	(France) Oreca	Martini MK49	Volkswagen	Results
1987	(France) Didier Artzet	(France) Monaco Sponsoring	Ralt RT31	Volkswagen	Results
1988	(Italy) Enrico Bertaggia	(Italy) Forti Corse	Dallara F388	Alfa Romeo	Results
1989	(Italy) Antonio Tamburini	(Italy) Prema Racing	Reynard 893	Alfa Romeo	Results
1990	(France) Laurent Aïello	(France) Oreca	Dallara F390	Volkswagen	Results
1991	(Germany) Jörg Müller	(Germany) Bongers Motorsport	Reynard 913	Volkswagen	Results
1992	(Germany) Marco Werner	(Germany) G+M Escom Motorsport	Ralt RT36	Opel	Results
1993	(Italy) Gianantonio Pacchioni	(Italy) Tatuus	Dallara F393	Fiat	Results
1994	(Italy) Giancarlo Fisichella	(Italy) RC Motorsport	Dallara F394	Opel	Results
1995	(Italy) Gianantonio Pacchioni	(Italy) Prema Powerteam	Dallara F395	Fiat	Results
1996	(Germany) Marcel Tiemann	(Germany) Opel Team BSR	Dallara F396	Opel	Results
1997	(Germany) Nick Heidfeld	(Germany) Opel Team BSR	Dallara F397	Opel	Results
1998 – 2004	Not held				
2005	(United Kingdom) Lewis Hamilton (Note: In 2005, the Formula Three Euroseries organisers held two races - Lewis Hamilton won both races.)	(France) ASM Formule 3	Dallara F305	Mercedes	Results

=== International Formula 3000 Championship ===
Year	Driver	Results
1998	(Germany) Nick Heidfeld	Results
1999	(Uruguay) Gonzalo Rodríguez	Results
2000	(Brazil) Bruno Junqueira	Results
2001	(Australia) Mark Webber	Results
2002	(France) Sébastien Bourdais	Results
2003	(Denmark) Nicolas Kiesa	Results
2004	(Italy) Vitantonio Liuzzi	Results

=== Formula Renault V6 Eurocup ===
Year	Driver
2003	(Brazil) Jaime Melo
2004	(Switzerland) Neel Jani

=== Formula Renault 3.5 Series ===
Year	Driver
2005	(San Marino) Christian Montanari
2006	(Venezuela) Pastor Maldonado
2007	(Portugal) Álvaro Parente
2008	(France) Charles Pic
2009	(United Kingdom) Oliver Turvey
2010	(Australia) Daniel Ricciardo
2011	(Australia) Daniel Ricciardo
2012	(United Kingdom) Sam Bird
2013	(Switzerland) Nico Müller
2014	(France) Norman Nato
2015	(Malaysia) Jazeman Jaafar

=== GP2 Series ===
Year	Race	Driver	Results
2005		(United Kingdom) Adam Carroll	Results
2006		(United Kingdom) Lewis Hamilton	Results
2007		(Venezuela) Pastor Maldonado	Results
2008	Feature	(Brazil) Bruno Senna	Results
2008	Sprint	(United Kingdom) Mike Conway	Results
2009	Feature	(France) Romain Grosjean	Results
2009	Sprint	(Venezuela) Pastor Maldonado	Results
2010	Feature	(Mexico) Sergio Pérez	Results
2010	Sprint	(Belgium) Jérôme d'Ambrosio	Results
2011	Feature	(Italy) Davide Valsecchi	Results
2011	Sprint	(France) Charles Pic	Results
2012	Feature	(Venezuela) Johnny Cecotto Jr.	Results
2012	Sprint	(United Kingdom) Jolyon Palmer	Results
2013	Feature	(United Kingdom) Sam Bird	Results
2013	Sprint	(Monaco) Stefano Coletti	Results
2014	Feature	(United Kingdom) Jolyon Palmer	Results
2014	Sprint	(Monaco) Stéphane Richelmi	Results
2015	Feature	(Belgium) Stoffel Vandoorne	Results
2015	Sprint	(New Zealand) Richie Stanaway	Results
2016	Feature	(Russia) Artem Markelov	Results
2016	Sprint	(Japan) Nobuharu Matsushita	Results

=== GP3 Series ===
Year	Race	Driver	Report
2012	Race 1	(Finland) Aaro Vainio	Results
2012	Race 2	(Philippines) Marlon Stöckinger	Results

=== FIA Formula 2 Championship ===
Year	Race	Driver	Team	Report
2017	Feature	(United Kingdom) Oliver Rowland	DAMS	Report
2017	Sprint	(Netherlands) Nyck de Vries	Rapax	Report
2018	Feature	(Russia) Artem Markelov	Russian Time	Report
2018	Sprint	(Italy) Antonio Fuoco	Charouz Racing System	Report
2019	Feature	(Netherlands) Nyck de Vries	ART Grand Prix	Report
2019	Sprint	(France) Anthoine Hubert	BWT Arden	Report
2021	Sprint 1	(China) Guanyu Zhou	UNI-Virtuosi Racing	Report
2021	Sprint 2	(United Kingdom) Dan Ticktum	Carlin	Report
2021	Feature	(France) Théo Pourchaire	ART Grand Prix	Report
2022	Sprint	(Norway) Dennis Hauger	Prema Racing	Report
2022	Feature	(Brazil) Felipe Drugovich	MP Motorsport	Report
2023	Sprint	(Japan) Ayumu Iwasa	DAMS	Report
2023	Feature	(Denmark) Frederik Vesti	Prema Racing	Report
2024	Sprint	(United Kingdom) Taylor Barnard	AIX Racing	Report
2024	Feature	(United Kingdom) Zak O'Sullivan	ART Grand Prix	Report
2025	Sprint	(India) Kush Maini	DAMS Lucas Oil	Report
2025	Feature	(United States) Jak Crawford	DAMS Lucas Oil	Report
2026	Sprint	(Mexico) Noel León	Campos Racing	Report
2026	Feature	(Bulgaria) Nikola Tsolov	Campos Racing	Report

=== Formula Regional European Championship ===
Year	Race	Driver	Team
2021	Race 1	(France) Isack Hadjar	R-ace GP
2021	Race 2	(Barbados) Zane Maloney	R-ace GP
2022	Race 1	(France) Hadrien David	R-ace GP
2022	Race 2	(Sweden) Dino Beganovic	Prema Racing

=== FIA Formula 3 Championship ===
Year	Race	Driver	Team	Report
2023	Sprint	(Spain) Pepe Martí	Campos Racing	Report
2023	Feature	(Italy) Gabriele Mini	Hitech Pulse-Eight	Report
2024	Sprint	(Bulgaria) Nikola Tsolov	ART Grand Prix	Report
2024	Feature	(Italy) Gabriele Mini	Prema Racing	Report
2025	Sprint	(Norway) Martinius Stenshorne	Hitech TGR	Report
2025	Feature	(Bulgaria) Nikola Tsolov	Campos Racing	Report
2026	Sprint	(China) Gerrard Xie	DAMS Lucas Oil	Report
2026	Feature	(Italy) Brando Badoer	Rodin Motorsport	Report
