= 2022 Macau Grand Prix =

69th running of the Macau Grand Prix

Race details
Date	20 November 2022
Official name	69th Macau Grand Prix – Sands China Formula 4 Macau Grand Prix
Location	Guia Circuit, Macau
Course	Temporary street circuit 6.120 km (3.803 mi)
Distance	Qualifying race 8 laps, 48.960 km (30.422 mi); Main race 12 laps, 73.440 km (45.634 mi)
- Qualifying race
Pole driver	Gerrard Xie (HKG)	Smart Life Racing Team

Podium
First	Gerrard Xie (HKG)	Smart Life Racing Team
Second	Charles Leong (MAC)	Theodore Blackjack Racing
Third	Andy Chang (MAC)	Champ Motorsport
- Main race
Pole driver	Andy Chang (MAC)	Champ Motorsport

Podium
First	Andy Chang (MAC)	Champ Motorsport
Second	Gerrard Xie (HKG)	Smart Life Racing Team
Third	Charles Leong (MAC)	Theodore Blackjack Racing

The 2022 Macau Grand Prix was a motor race for Formula 4 (F4) cars held on the streets of Macau on 20 November 2022. Just like in 2020 and 2021, the race was an F4 event (rather than Formula Three), and was part of the Fédération Internationale de l'Automobile (FIA)-administered F4 Chinese Championship for the third time running. The event consisted of two races; an eight-lap qualifying race deciding the starting grid for the twelve-lap main event. The 2022 race was the 69th running of the Macau Grand Prix, the third for F4 cars and the third meeting of the four-round 2022 F4 Chinese Championship.

== Entry list ==
All competitors used identical Mygale-chassis M14-F4 Formula 4 cars.

Team	No.	Driver
(China) Champ Motorsport	2	(Hong Kong) Patrick Tsang
(China) Champ Motorsport	8	(Macau) Andy Chang
(China) Smart Life Racing Team (Note: Written in Chinese.)	3	(Hong Kong) Gerrard Xie (Note: Xie was entered under a Hong Kong license for round 3 in Macau.)
(China) Smart Life Racing Team	9	(China) Lü Jingxi
(China) CD Racing	4	(China) Lin Lifeng
(China) CD Racing	56	(China) Jing Zefeng
(China) Pointer Racing	5	(Hong Kong) Henry Lee Junior
(China) Pointer Racing	99	(China) Wu Zedong
(China) Blackjack 21 Racing Team	55	(China) Lou Duan
(Hong Kong) Grid Motorsport	10	(China) Steven Bei
(Hong Kong) Grid Motorsport	17	(China) Neric Wei
(China) Theodore Blackjack Racing	11	(Macau) Charles Leong
(China) Theodore Blackjack Racing	27	(China) Li Sicheng
(China) iDEAK Racing	14	(Chinese Taipei) Brian Lee
(China) Racing YONG	22	(Macau) Lam Kam San
(China) Racing YONG	32	(Macau) Cheong Chi Hou
(China) Henmax Motorsport	77	(Hong Kong) Jacky Wong
(Hong Kong) Z-Challenger Racing	82	(Hong Kong) Royce Yu

== Results ==
=== Qualifying ===
Pos	No.	Driver	Team	Q1 Time	Q2 Time	Grid
1	8	(Macau) Andy Chang	Champ Motorsport	2:27.627	2:30.796	1
2	3	(Hong Kong) Gerrard Xie	Smart Life Racing Team	2:29.196	2:32.585	2
3	11	(Macau) Charles Leong	Theodore Blackjack Racing	2:29.543	2:33.526	3
4	27	(China) Li Sicheng	Theodore Blackjack Racing	2:30.479	2:32.520	4
5	82	(Hong Kong) Royce Yu	Z-Challenger Racing	2:31.668	2:33.959	5
6	56	(China) Jing Zefeng	CD Racing	2:32.392	2:35.347	6
7	9	(China) Lü Jingxi	Smart Life Racing Team	2:33.846	2:40.877	7
8	32	(Macau) Cheong Chi Hou	Racing YONG	2:36.175	2:42.811	8
9	14	(Chinese Taipei) Brian Lee	iDEAK Racing	2:36.487	2:41.366	9
10	5	(Hong Kong) Henry Lee Junior	Pointer Racing	2:37.656	2:51.995	10
11	77	(Hong Kong) Jacky Wong	Henmax Motorsport	2:37.695	2:43.492	11
12	4	(China) Lin Lifeng	CD Racing	2:38.399	2:41.539	12
13	2	(Hong Kong) Patrick Tsang	Champ Motorsport	2:38.869	2:43.438	13
14	22	(Macau) Lam Kam San	Racing YONG	2:38.893	2:45.539	14
15	17	(China) Neric Wei	Grid Motorsport	2:40.389	2:40.580	15
Not classified (110% time = 2:42.389)
16	55	(China) Lou Duan	Blackjack 21 Racing Team	—	3:01.003	16
WD	10	(China) Steven Bei	Grid Motorsport	—	—	WD
WD	99	(China) Wu Zedong	Pointer Racing	—	—	WD

=== Qualifying race ===
Pos	No.	Driver	Team	Laps	Time/Retired	Grid
1	3	(Hong Kong) Gerrard Xie	Smart Life Racing Team	8	24min 8.358sec	2
2	11	(Macau) Charles Leong	Theodore Blackjack Racing	8	+ 2.024s	3
3	8	(Macau) Andy Chang	Champ Motorsport	8	+ 2.885	1
4	27	(China) Li Sicheng	Theodore Blackjack Racing	8	+ 6.060	4
5	82	(Hong Kong) Royce Yu	Z-Challenger Racing	8	+ 6.681	5
6	56	(China) Jing Zefeng	CD Racing	8	+ 7.202	6
7	9	(China) Lü Jingxi	Smart Life Racing Team	8	+ 18.251	7
8	4	(China) Lin Lifeng	CD Racing	8	+ 38.575	12
9	14	(Chinese Taipei) Brian Lee	iDEAK Racing	8	+ 42.752	9
10	17	(China) Neric Wei	Grid Motorsport	8	+ 42.833	15
11	22	(Macau) Lam Kam San	Racing YONG	8	+ 43.775	14
12	55	(China) Lou Duan	Blackjack 21 Racing Team	8	+ 1:19.431	16
13	5	(Hong Kong) Henry Lee Junior	Pointer Racing	8	+ 1:51.246	10
Ret	77	(Hong Kong) Jacky Wong	Henmax Motorsport	0	Retired	11
DNS	32	(Macau) Cheong Chi Hou	Racing YONG	0	Did not start	8
DNS	2	(Hong Kong) Patrick Tsang	Champ Motorsport	0	Did not start	13
WD	10	(China) Steven Bei	Grid Motorsport	0	Withdrew	—
WD	99	(China) Wu Zedong	Pointer Racing	0	Withdrew	—

=== Main race ===
Pos	No.	Driver	Team	Laps	Time/Retired	Grid
1	8	(Macau) Andy Chang	Champ Motorsport	12	35min 41.871sec	3
2	3	(Hong Kong) Gerrard Xie	Smart Life Racing Team	12	+ 5.958	1
3	11	(Macau) Charles Leong	Theodore Blackjack Racing	12	+14.086	2
4	27	(China) Li Sicheng	Theodore Blackjack Racing	12	+ 18.406	4
5	56	(China) Jing Zefeng	CD Racing	12	+ 21.660	6
6	82	(Hong Kong) Royce Yu	Z-Challenger Racing	12	+ 25.205	5
7	9	(China) Lü Jingxi	Smart Life Racing Team	12	+ 28.917	7
8	17	(China) Neric Wei	Grid Motorsport	12	+ 1:08.079	10
9	22	(Macau) Lam Kam San	Racing YONG	12	+ 1:24.058	11
10	55	(China) Lou Duan	Blackjack 21 Racing Team	12	+ 1:29.473	12
11	14	(Chinese Taipei) Brian Lee	iDEAK Racing	12	+ 1:32.443	9
Ret	5	(Hong Kong) Henry Lee Junior	Pointer Racing	3	Retired	13
Ret	2	(Hong Kong) Patrick Tsang	Champ Motorsport	3	Retired	14
Ret	4	(China) Lin Lifeng	CD Racing	0	Retired	8
WD	77	(Hong Kong) Jacky Wong	Henmax Motorsport	0	Withdrew	—
WD	32	(Macau) Cheong Chi Hou	Racing YONG	0	Withdrew	—
WD	10	(China) Steven Bei	Grid Motorsport	0	Withdrew	—
WD	99	(China) Wu Zedong	Pointer Racing	0	Withdrew	—
