= 1995 Monaco Grand Prix Formula Three =

Formula Three Race

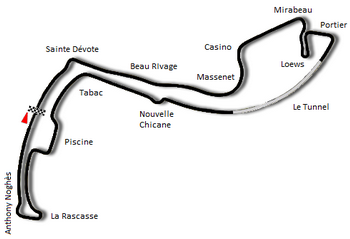
Circuit de Monaco (1986-1996)

Results from the 1995 Monaco Grand Prix Formula Three held at Monte Carlo on May 27, 1995, in the Circuit de Monaco.

== Classification ==
Pos	Driver	Constructor	Laps	Time/Retired
1	(Italy) Gianantonio Pacchioni	Dallara F395-Fiat	24	38.55,755
2	(Germany) Ralf Schumacher	Dallara F395-Opel	24	38.56,278
3	(Italy) Max Angelelli	Dallara F395-Opel	24	39.14,707
4	(Italy) Gianluca Paglicci	Dallara F395-Fiat	24	39.14,746
5	(Italy) Paolo Coloni	Dallara F395-Opel	24	39.22,555
6	(Austria) Alexander Wurz	Dallara F395-Opel	24	39.23,103
7	(Austria) Oliver Tichy	Dallara F395-Opel	24	39.30,864
8	(Argentina) Norberto Fontana	Dallara F395-Opel	24	39.51,501
9	(Germany) Klaus Graf	Dallara F395-Opel	24	40.09,542
10	(Italy) Oliver Martini	Dallara F395-Fiat	24	40.24,928
11	(Italy) Danilo Tomassini	Dallara F395-Fiat	23	
12	(Argentina) Ricardo Risatti	Dallara F395-Mugen-Honda	23	
13	(Italy) Luca Riccitelli	Dallara F395-Fiat	23	
14	(United States) Rod MacLeod	Dallara F395-Fiat	23	
15	(United Kingdom) Jeremy Charon	Dallara F395-Fiat	23	
16	(Italy) Cesare Manfredini	Dallara F395-Fiat	23	
17	(Brazil) Tony Kanaan	Dallara F395-Fiat	23	
18	(Germany) Arnd Meier	Dallara F395-Fiat	23	
19	(Netherlands) Tom Coronel	Dallara F395-Opel	10	
20	(Austria) Ralf Kalaschek	Dallara F395-Opel	9	
21	(Italy) Andrea Boldrini	Dallara F395-Fiat	9	
22	(Portugal) Pedro Couceiro	Dallara F395-Fiat	7	
23	(Italy) Thomas Biagi	Dallara F395-Opel	5	
24	(Italy) Luca Rangoni	Dallara F395-Fiat	2	
25	(Italy) Danilo Rossi	Dallara F395-Fiat	1	
