= 2025 Spielberg Formula 3 round =

Motor racing event

(Austria) 2025 Spielberg Formula 3 round
Round details
- Round 6 of 10 in the 2025 FIA Formula 3 Championship.
- Layout of the Red Bull Ring
- Location: Red Bull Ring; Spielberg, Styria, Austria
- Course: Permanent racing facility 4.318 km (2.683 mi)

Sprint Race
- Date: 28 June 2025
- Laps: 21
Podium
First	(Australia) James Wharton	ART Grand Prix
Second	(France) Alessandro Giusti	MP Motorsport
Third	(Bulgaria) Nikola Tsolov	Campos Racing
Fastest lap
Driver	(Norway) Martinius Stenshorne	Hitech TGR
- Time: 1:23.107 (on lap 8)

Feature Race
- Date: 29 June 2025
- Laps: 26
Pole position
Driver	(Bulgaria) Nikola Tsolov	Campos Racing
Time	1:20.743	
Podium
First	(Norway) Martinius Stenshorne	Hitech TGR
Second	(Germany) Tim Tramnitz	MP Motorsport
Third	(Spain) Mari Boya	Campos Racing
Fastest lap
Driver	(Spain) Mari Boya	Campos Racing
- Time: 1:22.963 (on lap 7)

The 2025 Spielberg FIA Formula 3 round was a motor racing event held between 27 and 29 June 2025 at the Red Bull Ring. It was the sixth round of the 2025 FIA Formula 3 Championship and was held in support of the 2025 Austrian Grand Prix.

There were two changes to the grid ahead of the round: James Hedley returned having recovered from an injury, and Nicola Lacorte served a race ban for obtaining more than 12 penalty points, with GB3 and Indy NXT driver Nikita Johnson competing in his place.

Nikola Tsolov took his second pole position of the year in qualifiying, with James Wharton taking pole for the reverse-grid sprint race. Wharton maintained his position throughout the race to take his maiden win in the category, followed by Alessandro Giusti. Charlie Wurz was running in third until lap 13, when he was hit by Brando Badoer, allowing Ugo Ugochukwu through to the final podium position. However, he was penalised post-race for going off-track while defending from Tsolov, who had charged through the field from twelfth, promoting Tsolov to third place.

Tsolov lead the feature race from the start, while second-place qualifier Brad Benavides dropped through the field once DRS was activated, allowing Tsolov to build a gap from Noah Strømsted, Rafael Câmara and Ugochukwu behind. The three tussled for the podium positions throughout the race, before Martinius Stenshorne, Tim Tramnitz and Mari Boya joined the fray from further down the field. Stenshorne moved into the podium positions on lap 14, and passed Câmara for second on lap 18, with Tramnitz and Boya following him a few laps later. After the race, Tsolov was disqualified for excessive plank wear, and Stenshorne inherited the victory.

== Classification ==
=== Qualifying ===
Qualifying was held on 27 June 2025, at 15:00 local time (UTC+2).

Pos.	No.	Driver	Entrant	Time/Gap	Grid SR	Grid FR
1	12	(Bulgaria) Nikola Tsolov	Campos Racing	1:20.743	12	1
2	28	(United States) Brad Benavides	AIX Racing	+0.176	11	2
3	4	(Denmark) Noah Strømsted	Trident	+0.178	10	3
4	18	(Spain) Bruno del Pino	MP Motorsport	+0.194	9	4
5	11	(Thailand) Tasanapol Inthraphuvasak	Campos Racing	+0.222	8	5
6	23	(United Kingdom) Callum Voisin	Rodin Motorsport	+0.258	7	6
7	5	(Brazil) Rafael Câmara	Trident	+0.268	6	7
8	3	(United States) Ugo Ugochukwu	Prema Racing	+0.272	5	8
9	1	(Italy) Brando Badoer	Prema Racing	+0.276	4	9
10	6	(Austria) Charlie Wurz	Trident	+0.297	3	10
11	19	(France) Alessandro Giusti	MP Motorsport	+0.300	2	11
12	9	(Australia) James Wharton	ART Grand Prix	+0.363	1	12
13	2	(Mexico) Noel León	Prema Racing	+0.364	13	13
14	10	(Spain) Mari Boya	Campos Racing	+0.396	14	14
15	14	(Norway) Martinius Stenshorne	Hitech TGR	+0.400	15	15
16	21	(Mexico) Santiago Ramos	Van Amersfoort Racing	+0.462	16	16
17	17	(Germany) Tim Tramnitz	MP Motorsport	+0.467	17	17
18	25	(Poland) Roman Bilinski	Rodin Motorsport	+0.501	23^{1}	18
19	20	(France) Théophile Naël	Van Amersfoort Racing	+0.513	18	19
20	8	(Finland) Tuukka Taponen	ART Grand Prix	+0.576	19	20
21	24	(New Zealand) Louis Sharp	Rodin Motorsport	+0.615	20	21
22	7	(Netherlands) Laurens van Hoepen	ART Grand Prix	+0.654	21	22
23	31	(Singapore) Christian Ho	DAMS Lucas Oil	+0.694	22	28^{2}
24	15	(Mexico) Jesse Carrasquedo Jr.	Hitech TGR	+0.816	24	23
25	30	(Peru) Matías Zagazeta	DAMS Lucas Oil	+0.836	25	24
26	22	(Portugal) Ivan Domingues	Van Amersfoort Racing	+0.998	26	25
27	26	(United Kingdom) James Hedley	AIX Racing	+1.038	27	26
28	27	(Italy) Nicola Marinangeli	AIX Racing	+1.080	28	27
29	16	(China) Gerrard Xie	Hitech TGR	+1.493	29	29
30	29	(United States) Nikita Johnson	DAMS Lucas Oil	+1.797	30	30

Notes:

- ^1 Roman Biliński was given a five-place grid penalty for the sprint race for causing a collision in the previous round.
- ^2 Christian Ho was given a five-place grid penalty for the feature race for causing a collision during the sprint race.

=== Sprint race ===
The sprint race was held on 28 June 2025, at 10:05 local time (UTC+2).

Pos.	No.	Driver	Team	Laps	Time/Gap	Grid	Pts.
1	9	(Australia) James Wharton	ART Grand Prix	21	33:49.853	1	10
2	19	(France) Alessandro Giusti	MP Motorsport	21	+0.612	2	9
3	12	(Bulgaria) Nikola Tsolov	Campos Racing	21	+1.564	12	8
4	11	(Thailand) Tasanapol Inthraphuvasak	Campos Racing	21	+3.325	8	7
5	10	(Spain) Mari Boya	Campos Racing	21	+7.726	14	6
6	17	(Germany) Tim Tramnitz	MP Motorsport	21	+7.895	17	5
7	14	(Norway) Martinius Stenshorne	Hitech TGR	21	+9.034	15	4+1
8	23	(United Kingdom) Callum Voisin	Rodin Motorsport	21	+9.284	7	3
9	5	(Brazil) Rafael Câmara	Trident	21	+9.652	6	2
10	2	(Mexico) Noel León	Prema Racing	21	+9.801	13	1
11	20	(France) Théophile Naël	Van Amersfoort Racing	21	+10.321	18	
12	7	(Netherlands) Laurens van Hoepen	ART Grand Prix	21	+10.460	21	
13	21	(Mexico) Santiago Ramos	Van Amersfoort Racing	21	+10.629	16	
14	15	(Mexico) Jesse Carrasquedo Jr.	Hitech TGR	21	+10.958	24	
15	25	(Poland) Roman Bilinski	Rodin Motorsport	21	+11.070	23	
16	3	(United States) Ugo Ugochukwu	Prema Racing	21	+11.162^{1}	5	
17	30	(Peru) Matías Zagazeta	DAMS Lucas Oil	21	+11.339	25	
18	29	(United States) Nikita Johnson	DAMS Lucas Oil	21	+11.658	30	
19	27	(Italy) Nicola Marinangeli	AIX Racing	21	+11.970	28	
20	4	(Denmark) Noah Strømsted	Trident	21	+12.670	10	
21	16	(China) Gerrard Xie	Hitech TGR	21	+12.893	29	
22	18	(Spain) Bruno del Pino	MP Motorsport	21	+23.215^{2}	9	
23	1	(Italy) Brando Badoer	Prema Racing	21	+23.537^{2}	4	
DNF	6	(Austria) Charlie Wurz	Trident	12	Collision	3	
DNF	28	(United States) Brad Benavides	AIX Racing	8	Puncture	11	
DNF	22	(Portugal) Ivan Domingues	Van Amersfoort Racing	7	Retired	26	
DNF	31	(Singapore) Christian Ho	DAMS Lucas Oil	2	Collision damage	22	
DNF	8	(Finland) Tuukka Taponen	ART Grand Prix	1	Collision	19	
DNF	24	(New Zealand) Louis Sharp	Rodin Motorsport	1	Collision	20	
DSQ	26	(United Kingdom) James Hedley	AIX Racing	DSQ	Parc fermé breach^{3}	27	
Fastest lap: (Norway) Martinius Stenshorne (1:23.107 on lap 8)

Notes:

- ^1 Ugo Ugochukwu was given a ten-second penalty for leaving the track and gaining an advantage. This demoted him from 3rd to 16th.
- ^2 Bruno del Pino and Brando Badoer were both given ten-second penalties for causing collisions. This did not affect their final finishing positions.
- ^3 James Hedley was disqualified from the race for breaching parc fermé. He was originally classified in 20th.

=== Feature race ===
The feature race was held on 29 June 2025, at 08:30 local time (UTC+2).

Pos.	No.	Driver	Team	Laps	Time/Gap	Grid	Pts.
1	14	(Norway) Martinius Stenshorne	Hitech TGR	26	36:46.954	15	25
2	17	(Germany) Tim Tramnitz	MP Motorsport	26	+2.075	17	18
3	10	(Spain) Mari Boya	Campos Racing	26	+2.458	14	15+1
4	3	(United States) Ugo Ugochukwu	Prema Racing	26	+4.091	8	12
5	5	(Brazil) Rafael Câmara	Trident	26	+5.893	7	10
6	6	(Austria) Charlie Wurz	Trident	26	+7.229	10	8
7	4	(Denmark) Noah Strømsted	Trident	26	+9.875	3	6
8	23	(United Kingdom) Callum Voisin	Rodin Motorsport	26	+10.680	6	4
9	28	(United States) Brad Benavides	AIX Racing	26	+11.388	2	2
10	20	(France) Théophile Naël	Van Amersfoort Racing	26	+11.826	19	1
11	2	(Mexico) Noel León	Prema Racing	26	+12.649	13	
12	19	(France) Alessandro Giusti	MP Motorsport	26	+13.315	11	
13	15	(Mexico) Jesse Carrasquedo Jr.	Hitech TGR	26	+13.777	23	
14	9	(Australia) James Wharton	ART Grand Prix	26	+14.807	12	
15	11	(Thailand) Tasanapol Inthraphuvasak	Campos Racing	26	+15.181	5	
16	24	(New Zealand) Louis Sharp	Rodin Motorsport	26	+15.596	21	
17	16	(China) Gerrard Xie	Hitech TGR	26	+16.320	29	
18	30	(Peru) Matías Zagazeta	DAMS Lucas Oil	26	+16.842	24	
19	18	(Spain) Bruno del Pino	MP Motorsport	26	+17.116	4	
20	8	(Finland) Tuukka Taponen	ART Grand Prix	26	+17.774	20	
21	22	(Portugal) Ivan Domingues	Van Amersfoort Racing	26	+17.842	25	
22	29	(United States) Nikita Johnson	DAMS Lucas Oil	26	+18.281	30	
23	25	(Poland) Roman Bilinski	Rodin Motorsport	26	+19.362	18	
24	31	(Singapore) Christian Ho	DAMS Lucas Oil	26	+19.925	28	
25	27	(Italy) Nicola Marinangeli	AIX Racing	26	+37.377^{1}	27	
26	26	(United Kingdom) James Hedley	AIX Racing	26	+37.772	26	
27	21	(Mexico) Santiago Ramos	Van Amersfoort Racing	26	+59.773	16	
DNF	1	(Italy) Brando Badoer	Prema Racing	11	Suspension damage	9	
DSQ	12	(Bulgaria) Nikola Tsolov	Campos Racing	DSQ	Plank wear^{2}	1	2
DSQ	7	(Netherlands) Laurens van Hoepen	ART Grand Prix	DSQ	Tyre pressures^{2}	22	
Fastest lap: (Spain) Mari Boya (1:22.963 on lap 7)

Notes:

- ^1 Nicola Marinangeli was given two five-second time penalties for exceeding track limits. This did not affect his finishing position.
- ^2 Nikola Tsolov and Laurens van Hoepen were both disqualified from the race for breaching the technical regulations. They were originally classified 1st and 9th respectively.

== Standings after the event ==
Drivers' Championship standings

	Pos.	Driver	Points
	1	(Brazil) Rafael Câmara	117
1	2	(Germany) Tim Tramnitz	93
1	3	(Bulgaria) Nikola Tsolov	89
7	4	(Norway) Martinius Stenshorne	67
1	5	(Denmark) Noah Strømsted	62

Teams' Championship standings

	Pos.	Team	Points
	1	(Italy) Trident	202
	2	(Spain) Campos Racing	169
	3	(Netherlands) MP Motorsport	158
	4	(Netherlands) Van Amersfoort Racing	107
1	5	(France) ART Grand Prix	100

Note: Only the top five positions are included for both sets of standings.

== See also ==
- 2025 Austrian Grand Prix
- 2025 Spielberg Formula 2 round

Previous round: 2025 Barcelona Formula 3 round	FIA Formula 3 Championship; 2025 season	Next round: 2025 Silverstone Formula 3 round
Previous round: 2024 Spielberg Formula 3 round	Spielberg Formula 3 round	Next round: 2026 Spielberg Formula 3 round
