= 1980 Monaco Grand Prix Formula Three =

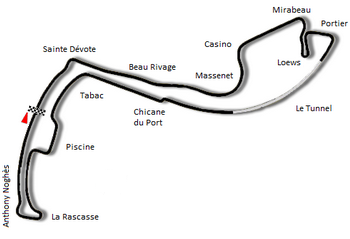
Circuit de Monaco (1976-1985)

Results from the 1980 Monaco Grand Prix Formula Three held at Monte Carlo on May 17, 1980, in the Circuit de Monaco.

== Classification ==
Pos	Driver	Constructor	Laps	Time/Retired
1	(Italy) Mauro Baldi	Martini MK31-Toyota	24	39.40,116
2	(Italy) Michele Alboreto	March 803-Alfa Romeo	24	40.07,307
3	(France) Jean-Louis Schlesser	March 803-Alfa Romeo	24	40.07,881
4	(United Kingdom) Kenny Acheson	March 793-Toyota	24	40.11,383
5	(Italy) Daniele Albertin	Martini MK31-Toyota	24	40.18,616
6	(Germany) Hans-Georg Bürger	Ralt RT3-Toyota	24	40.22,583
7	(France) Alain Ferté	Martini MK27-Renault	24	40.23,216
8	(United Kingdom) Nigel Mansell	March 803-Toyota	24	40.24,372
9	(Germany) Günter Gebhardt	March 793-Volkswagen	24	40.34,794
10	(France) Michele Kropf	Ralt RT1-Toyota	24	40.34,983
11	(Italy) Fernando Cazzaniga	March 783-Toyota	24	41.12,754
12	(Argentina) Oscar Larrauri	Martini MK31-Toyota	22	
13	(Sweden) Slim Borgudd	March 803-Toyota	20	
DNF	(New Zealand) Brett Riley	March 793-Toyota	14	
DNF	(Colombia) Roberto Guerrero	Argo JM6-Toyota	4	
DNF	(Belgium) Thierry Boutsen	Martini MK31-Toyota	4	
DNF	(Italy) Piero Necchi	Martini MK27-Toyota	4	
DNF	(France) Philippe Streiff	Martini MK31-Toyota	4	
DNF	(Italy) Guido Pardini	Dallara 380-Toyota	1	
DNF	(France) Philippe Alliot	Martini MK31-Toyota	0	
