= 2022 Formula Renault Super Challenge =

Single seater motor racing

The 2022 Formula Renault Super Challenge, was a multi-event, Formula Renault open-wheel single seater motor racing championship held across Asia.

When the series last ran in 2019, it was known as Asian Formula Renault and used Formula Renault 2.0 machinery. A switch to Formula Regional cars to align with the developments in Europe was planned, but the seasons in 2020 and 2021 were both cancelled due to the COVID-19 pandemic.

In 2022, this switch was tried for the third time, but the once again rebranded Alpine Formula Racing Asia Series attracted no entries, so the Formula Renault Super Challenge was founded to hold races using old Formula Renault 2.0 cars again.

After six races over three rounds all held at Zhuzhou International Circuit, Gerrard Xie became champion when the fourth round was cancelled and no replacement came to be. His team, H-Star Racing, won the teams' title.

== Teams and drivers ==
Team	No.	Driver name	Class	Rounds
FRD Racing	2	(Hong Kong) Brian Lai	P	2–3
FRD Racing	7	(China) Yat Chau Lin	R	1
FRD Racing	13	(Hong Kong) Kenneth Ma	P	1–2
FRD Racing	17	(China) Press Zhu	P	3
FRD Racing	25	(China) Selina Li	P	3
FRD Racing	77	(Hong Kong) Jacky Wong	P	3
Pointer Racing	3	(Hong Kong) Allen Lo	E	1
Pointer Racing	33	(Hong Kong) Allen Lo	E	3
Pointer Racing	7	(China) Tianhao Zhu	E	2
Pointer Racing	57	(China) Jason Wu	P	2–3
H-Star Racing	3	(Hong Kong) Gerrard Xie	P	2–3
H-Star Racing	9	(Hong Kong) Hugo Hung	E	All
H-Star Racing	11	(Macau) Nicholas Lai	E	1–2
H-Star Racing	37	(Hong Kong) Donnie Deng	E	2
H-Star Racing	55	(Hong Kong) William Kwok	R	1
H-Star Racing	77	(Hong Kong) Jacky Wong	P	1
Grid Motorsport	12	(China) Siling Bei	P	1
Zhuzhou International Circuit Team	63	(China) Fu Bin	E	1, 3

Icon	Class
P	Pro
E	Elite
R	Rookie

== Calendar and results ==
The planned calendar was revealed in April of 2022. All events were held in China. In early July, the Xiamen event was cancelled. The third event of the season was later postponed by two weeks. The season finale was then also postponed by six weeks, before eventually being cancelled entirely because of China's zero-COVID policy. It was believed a replacement event was to be organized, but those plans did not come to fruition.

Round		Circuit	Date	Pole position	Fastest lap	Winning driver	Winning team	Elite Class winner	Rookie Class winner
1	R1	Zhuzhou International Circuit, Zhuzhou	22 May	(China) Siling Bei	(China) Siling Bei	(China) Siling Bei	Grid Motorsport	(Hong Kong) Hugo Hung	(Hong Kong) William Kwok
1	R2	Zhuzhou International Circuit, Zhuzhou	22 May		(China) Siling Bei	(China) Siling Bei	Grid Motorsport	(China) Fu Bin	(Hong Kong) William Kwok
2	R3	Zhuzhou International Circuit, Zhuzhou	19 June	(China) Gerrard Xie	(China) Gerrard Xie	(China) Gerrard Xie	H-Star Racing	(Macau) Nicholas Lai	no entries
2	R4	Zhuzhou International Circuit, Zhuzhou	19 June		(China) Gerrard Xie	(China) Gerrard Xie	H-Star Racing	(Hong Kong) Jason Wu	no entries
3	R5	Zhuzhou International Circuit, Zhuzhou	28 August	(China) Gerrard Xie	(China) Gerrard Xie	(China) Gerrard Xie	H-Star Racing	(Hong Kong) Allen Lo	no entries
3	R6	Zhuzhou International Circuit, Zhuzhou	28 August		(China) Gerrard Xie	(China) Gerrard Xie	H-Star Racing	(Hong Kong) Hugo Hung	no entries

== Season summary ==
After two years of absence owing to the COVID-19 pandemic, Formula Renault-level racing was back in Asia under the new "Formula Renault Super Challenge" guise. Nine drivers were entered into the first round of the championship, held at Zhuzhou International Circuit. The whole weekend was very rainy, and Siling Bei coped the best with the conditions. He set pole, and went on to win the first race ahead of Jacky Wong and William Kwok. His win in race one handed him pole for race two, where he repeated his efforts to claim a perfect weekend. Wong was second once again, and Kwok also repeated his podium success, this time having to fight off a charging Yat Chau Lin. Bei ended the first round with 60 points to his name, twelve points ahead of Wong.

Round two was held at the same circuit, but Bei was absent. In his place, it was debutant Gerrard Xie who set the pace all weekend. He won qualifying and kept his lead despite a bad start. He won the race ahead of Jason Wu, who also joined the championship for round two, and Nicholas Lai. Like Bei in round one, Xie then went on to also win race two. Wu was on the podium again, this time in third, despite dropping back at the start. Second was his teammate Tianhao Zhu. With his two wins matching Bei's efforts from round one, Xie and Bei now were equal on 60 points. Kenneth Ma led the standings two points ahead of the pair, despite not having a podium to his name, courtesy of his consistent finishes in all four races so far.

The third round was originally planned to be held at the newly constructed Xiamen International Circuit, but was later postponed and once again held in Zhuzhou. Xie was once again the driver to beat, comfortably setting pole position in qualifying. He was unmatched in the first race and left Wu and Brian Lai to fight over second, with Wu eventually coming out on top. Race two offered much of the same, Xie once again unchallenged on top and Wu and Lai fighting behind. This time it was Lai who was able to claim second place. Four wins out of four races saw Xie climb on top of the standings, and Wu's two podiums put him in second, 32 points behind Xie.

== Championship standings ==
Points system

Points were awarded to the top 14 classified finishers.

Drivers' Championship
Position	**1st**	**2nd**	**3rd**	**4th**	**5th**	**6th**	**7th**	**8th**	**9th**	**10th**	**11th**	**12th**	**13th**	**14th**
Points	30	24	20	17	15	13	11	9	7	5	4	3	2	1

=== Drivers' Championship ===
Pos	Driver	ZHZ1		ZHZ2		ZHZ3		Pts
1	(Hong Kong) Gerrard Xie			**1**	1	**1**	1	120
2	(China) Jason Wu			2	3	2	3	88
3	(Hong Kong) Jacky Wong	2	2			4	4	82
4	(Hong Kong) Brian Lai			6	8	3	2	66
5	(Hong Kong) Kenneth Ma	5	5	4	5			62
6	(China) Siling Bei	**1**	1					60
7	(Hong Kong) Hugo Hung	4	7	8	4	DNS	Ret	54
8	(Macau) Nicholas Lai	8	8	3	6			51
9	(Hong Kong) William Kwok	3	3					40
10	(China) Tianhao Zhu			5	2			39
11	(China) Yat Chau Lin	7	4					28
12	(China) Selina Li					6	5	28
13	(China) Fu Bin	6	6			Ret	Ret	26
14	(Hong Kong) Donnie Deng			7	7			22
15	(Hong Kong) Allen Lo	DNS	DNS			5	DNS	15
—	(China) Press Zhu					DNS	DNS	—
Pos	Driver	ZHZ1		ZHZ2		ZHZ3		Pts

Colour	Result
Gold	Winner
Silver	Second place
Bronze	Third place
Green	Points classification
Blue	Non-points classification
Blue	Non-classified finish (NC)
Purple	Retired, not classified (Ret)
Red	Did not qualify (DNQ)
Red	Did not pre-qualify (DNPQ)
Black	Disqualified (DSQ)
White	Did not start (DNS)
White	Withdrew (WD)
White	Race cancelled (C)
Blank	Did not practice (DNP)
Blank	Did not arrive (DNA)
Blank	Excluded (EX)

**Bold** – Pole

Italics – Fastest Lap

=== Teams' Championships ===
Pos	Team	Points
1	H-Star Racing	60
2	FRD Racing	38
3	Pointer Racing	30
4	Grid Motorsport	16
5	Zhuzhou International Circuit Team	8
