= 2025 FIA Formula 3 Championship =

Motor racing championship held in 2025

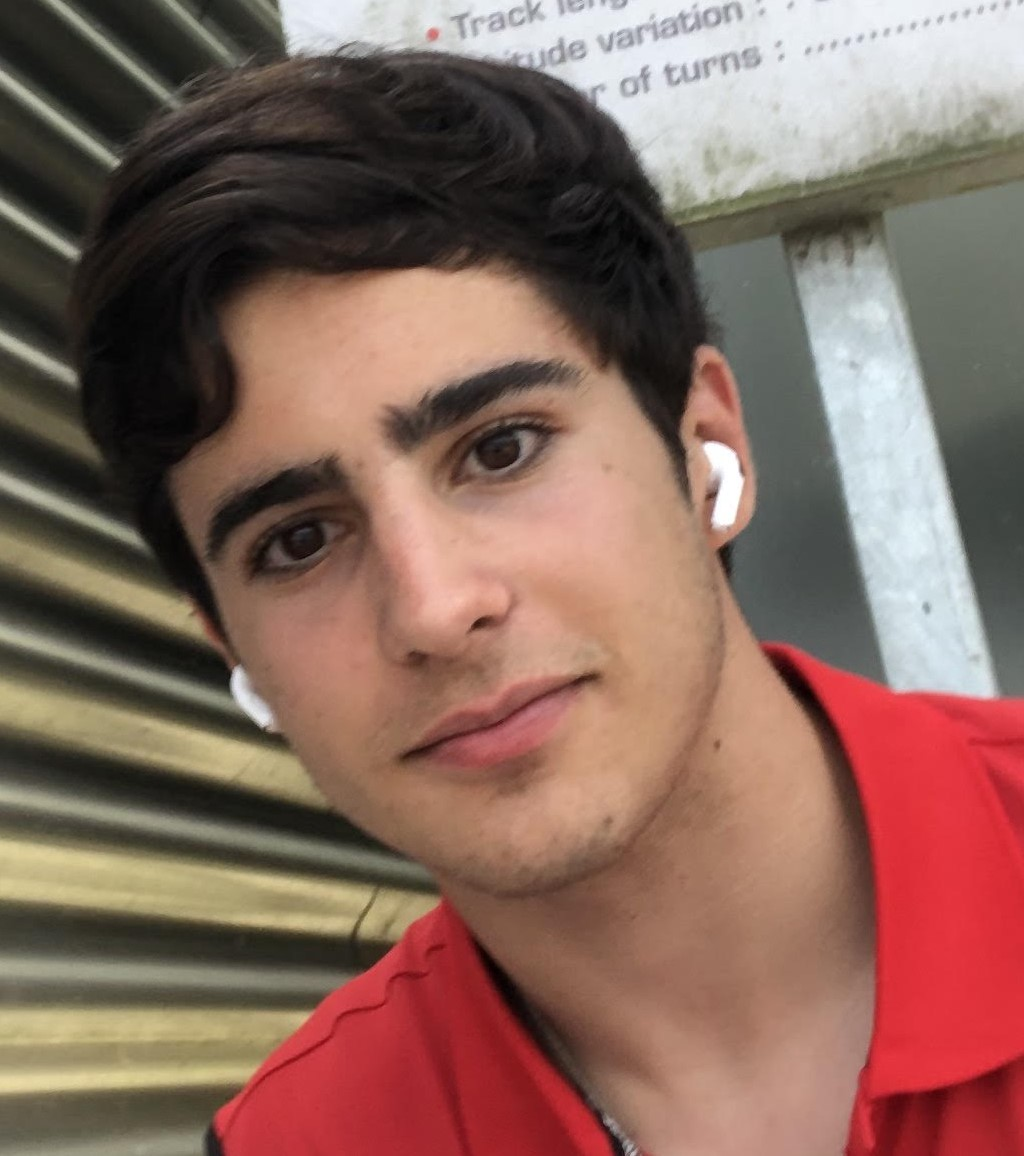
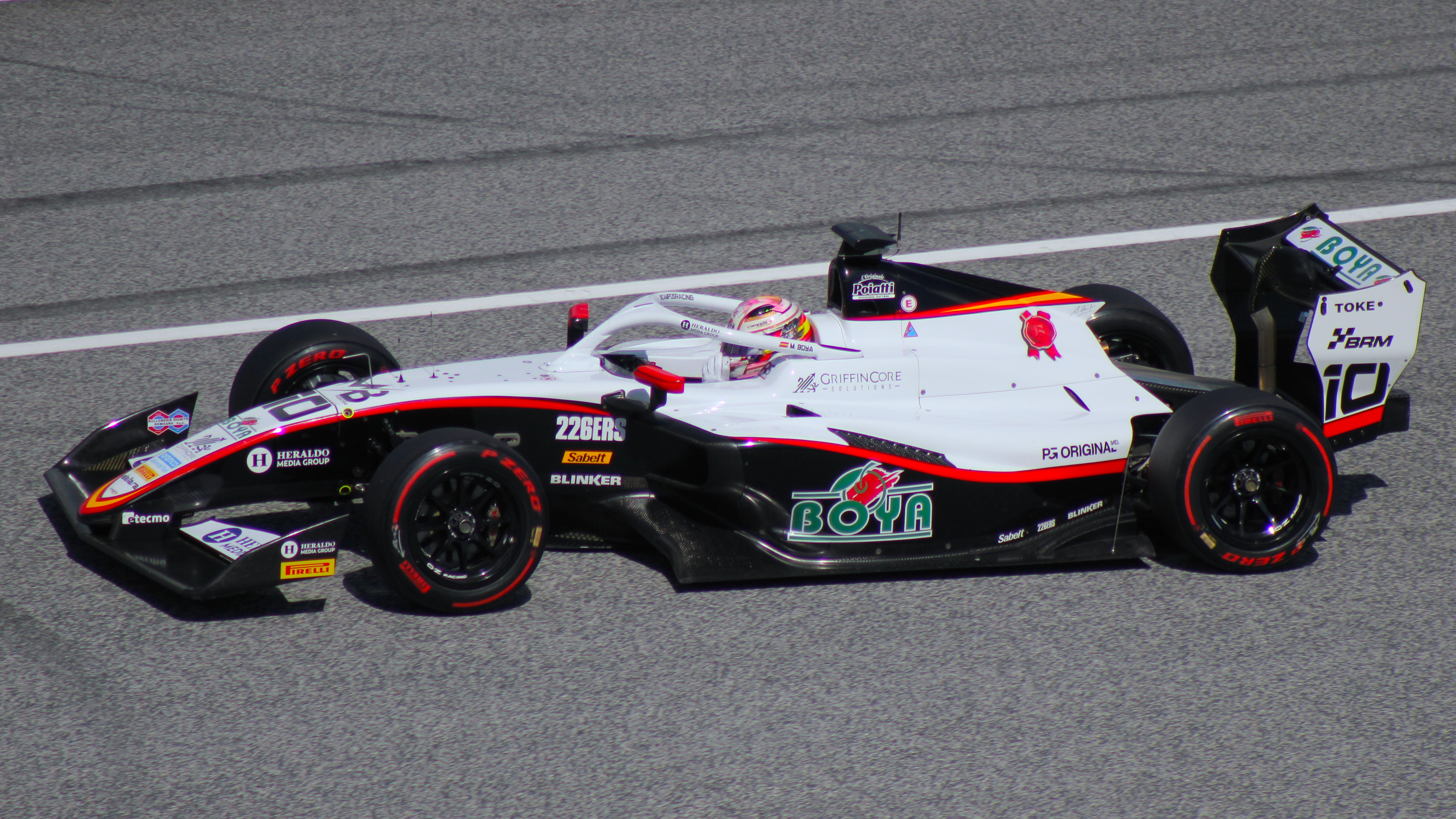
Rafael Câmara, driving for Trident, became the 2025 FIA Formula 3 Champion. Campos Racing won the Teams' Championship.

The 2025 FIA Formula 3 Championship was a motor racing championship for Formula 3 cars sanctioned by the Fédération Internationale de l'Automobile (FIA). The championship was the sixteenth season of Formula 3 racing since the inception of the GP3 Series and the seventh season run under the FIA Formula 3 Championship moniker. FIA Formula 3 is an open-wheel racing category serving as the third tier of formula racing in the FIA Global Pathway. The category was run in support of selected rounds of the 2025 FIA Formula One World Championship. As the championship is a spec series, all teams and drivers who competed in the championship ran the same car, the Dallara F3 2025.

Rafael Câmara won the Drivers' Championship in his rookie season with Trident after winning the feature race at the penultimate round in Hungary, becoming the first rookie champion since fellow countryman Gabriel Bortoleto back in 2023, and the fourth rookie champion in the FIA Formula 3 Championship.

Prema Racing entered the season as the reigning Teams' Champions, having secured their title at the penultimate race of the 2024 season at Circuit de Spa-Francorchamps. They did not defend their title, with Campos Racing winning their first Teams' Championship in the FIA's third tier of single-seater racing at the final race of the season.

2025 saw the introduction of a new Dallara-built chassis, with the championship retiring the Dallara F3 2019 it had used since its inaugural season in 2019.

== Entries ==
The following teams and drivers competed in the 2025 FIA Formula 3 Championship. As the championship is a spec series, all teams competed with an identical Dallara F3 2025 chassis with a 3.4 L (207 cu in) naturally-aspirated V6 engine developed by Mecachrome. All teams competed with tyres supplied by Pirelli.

Team	No.	Driver	Rounds
(Italy) Prema Racing	1	(Italy) Brando Badoer	All
(Italy) Prema Racing	2	(Mexico) Noel León	All
(Italy) Prema Racing	3	(United States) Ugo Ugochukwu	All
(Italy) Trident	4	(Denmark) Noah Strømsted	All
(Italy) Trident	5	(Brazil) Rafael Câmara	All
(Italy) Trident	6	(Austria) Charlie Wurz	All
(France) ART Grand Prix	7	(Netherlands) Laurens van Hoepen	All
(France) ART Grand Prix	8	(Finland) Tuukka Taponen	All
(France) ART Grand Prix	9	(Australia) James Wharton	All
(Spain) Campos Racing	10	(Spain) Mari Boya	All
(Spain) Campos Racing	11	(Thailand) Tasanapol Inthraphuvasak	All
(Spain) Campos Racing	12	(Bulgaria) Nikola Tsolov	All
(United Kingdom) Hitech TGR	14	(Norway) Martinius Stenshorne	All
(United Kingdom) Hitech TGR	15	(Austria) Joshua Dufek	1–4
(United Kingdom) Hitech TGR	15	(Mexico) Jesse Carrasquedo Jr.	5–6
(United Kingdom) Hitech TGR	15	(United States) Nikita Johnson	7, 9–10
(United Kingdom) Hitech TGR	15	(United Kingdom) Freddie Slater	8
(United Kingdom) Hitech TGR	16	(China) Gerrard Xie	All
(Netherlands) MP Motorsport	17	(Germany) Tim Tramnitz	All
(Netherlands) MP Motorsport	18	(Spain) Bruno del Pino	All
(Netherlands) MP Motorsport	19	(France) Alessandro Giusti	All
(Netherlands) Van Amersfoort Racing	20	(France) Théophile Naël	All
(Netherlands) Van Amersfoort Racing	21	(Mexico) Santiago Ramos	1–9
(Netherlands) Van Amersfoort Racing	21	(United Kingdom) James Hedley	10
(Netherlands) Van Amersfoort Racing	22	(Portugal) Ivan Domingues	All
(New Zealand) Rodin Motorsport	23	(United Kingdom) Callum Voisin	All
(New Zealand) Rodin Motorsport	24	(New Zealand) Louis Sharp	All
(New Zealand) Rodin Motorsport	25	(Poland) Roman Bilinski	All
(United Arab Emirates) AIX Racing	26	(Spain) Javier Sagrera	1–2
(United Arab Emirates) AIX Racing	26	(United Kingdom) James Hedley	3–4, 6–9
(United Arab Emirates) AIX Racing	26	(Mexico) José Garfias	5
(United Arab Emirates) AIX Racing	26	(Brazil) Fernando Barrichello	10
(United Arab Emirates) AIX Racing	27	(Italy) Nicola Marinangeli	All
(United Arab Emirates) AIX Racing	28	(Italy) Nikita Bedrin (Note: Bedrin is Russian, but competed under an Italian licence as Russian national emblems were banned by the FIA due to the Russian invasion of Ukraine.)	1
(United Arab Emirates) AIX Racing	28	(United Kingdom) Freddie Slater	2
(United Arab Emirates) AIX Racing	28	(United States) Brad Benavides	3–10
(France) DAMS Lucas Oil	29	(Italy) Nicola Lacorte	1–5, 7–10
(France) DAMS Lucas Oil	29	(United States) Nikita Johnson	6
(France) DAMS Lucas Oil	30	(Peru) Matías Zagazeta	All
(France) DAMS Lucas Oil	31	(Singapore) Christian Ho	All

=== Team changes ===
After 15 years of competing in FIA F3 and its predecessor GP3, Jenzer Motorsport departed the championship to focus on its Formula 4 efforts. DAMS Lucas Oil took over their spot as the series' tenth team, returning to the third tier of FIA-sanctioned formula racing for the first time since the 2017 GP3 Series.

Hitech Grand Prix and Toyota Gazoo Racing's TGR-DC junior programme formed a new collaboration in 2025, with the team entering under the Hitech TGR guise.

AIX Racing now competed under an Emirati racing licence for the 2025 season following the use of a German racing licence in 2024. This marked the first time in the championship's history that a Middle Eastern team competed on the grid.

=== Driver changes ===
Prema Racing had an all new-lineup as all three of their drivers graduated to Formula 2, with 2024 runner-up Gabriele Minì staying with Prema, Red Bull junior Arvid Lindblad moving to Campos Racing, and Ferrari junior Dino Beganovic joining Hitech TGR. Two McLaren juniors in Ugo Ugochukwu and Brando Badoer graduated from the Formula Regional European Championship, while Prema's final seat was taken by Noel León, who departed Van Amersfoort Racing after coming tenth with the team in 2024.

Trident also hired three new drivers as reigning champion Leonardo Fornaroli and Sami Meguetounif moved up to Formula 2, with Fornaroli joining Invicta Racing and Meguetounif staying with Trident, and Santiago Ramos moving to Van Amersfoort Racing. The team recruited Charlie Wurz, who came 22nd with Jenzer Motorsport in his debut FIA Formula 3 season. Trident's lineup was completed by two drivers stepping up from FRECA in Rafael Câmara, the reigning series champion who drove for Prema, and rookie champion Noah Strømsted, who came sixth driving for RPM and made a one-off FIA F3 appearance in 2024 with Campos Racing.

ART Grand Prix saw Nikola Tsolov and Christian Mansell leave the team, with the former moving to Campos Racing, and the latter initially set to graduate to Formula 2 with Rodin Motorsport before announcing his temporary retirement from racing due to personal reasons. As a replacement, the team signed the drivers that came second and third in FRECA in 2024: James Wharton, who drove for Prema and made his FIA F3 debut when he substituted for Martinius Stenshorne at Hitech, and Ferrari junior Tuukka Taponen, who drove for R-ace GP and also made his FIA F3 debut as he replaced Tsolov at ART Grand Prix at the penultimate round of 2024.

Campos Racing signed two drivers switching from other teams to replace Oliver Goethe and Sebastián Montoya as both graduated to Formula 2 with MP Motorsport and Prema Racing, respectively. Tasanapol Inthraphuvasak, who left AIX Racing after coming 24th with the team in his debut season, returned to the team he drove for in Eurocup-3 in 2023, while Nikola Tsolov ended his second FIA F3 season with ART Grand Prix in eleventh and returned to the team with whom he won the 2022 Spanish F4 title.

Hitech TGR saw both Luke Browning and Cian Shields step up to Formula 2, with Browning staying with Hitech and Shields joining AIX Racing. The team promoted one driver from their GB3 outfit, with Gerrard Xie graduating to FIA F3 after coming seventh with the team in 2024, and signed Joshua Dufek, who departed AIX Racing after finishing his debut season in 28th.

MP Motorsport also had two new drivers, as Alex Dunne stepped up to Formula 2 with Rodin Motorsport and Kacper Sztuka moved to Eurocup-3 to join Campos Racing's satellite Griffin Core outfit. To replace them, the team promoted Bruno del Pino from their Eurocup-3 outfit, where he was the rookie champion in 2023, and signed Williams Academy driver Alessandro Giusti, who stepped up from FRECA after coming fourth in 2024 with ART Grand Prix.

All three of Van Amersfoort Racing's drivers left the team, with Noel León joining Prema and both Tommy Smith and Sophia Flörsch departing the series after multiple seasons to move to Indy NXT with HMD Motorsports. The team took on one experienced driver in Santiago Ramos, who embarked on his second FIA F3 season after finishing 16th with Trident in 2024. Two FRECA graduates joined him: Ivan Domingues, who finished tenth with Van Amersfoort Racing in that series in 2024, and 2023 Spanish F4 Champion Théophile Naël, who joined the team after coming ninth in FRECA with Saintéloc Racing.

Rodin Motorsport also signed two new drivers as Joseph Loake departed the series to move to join Garage 59 in the GT World Challenge Europe Endurance Cup and Piotr Wiśnicki left the team. The team promoted reigning GB3 Champion Louis Sharp from its outfit in that championship and signed 2024 Formula Regional Oceania Champion Roman Bilinski, who has been competing with Trident in FRECA for the past three years.

AIX Racing had two new drivers in its line up as Inthraphuvasak and Dufek moved to Campos Racing and Hitech TGR, respectively. The team signed Eurocup-3 runner-up Javier Sagrera to fill one of the seats. International GT Open driver Nicola Marinangeli also joined the team, returning to single-seater racing for the first time since the 2022 Euroformula Open Championship to make his FIA F3 debut.

New team DAMS Lucas Oil signed Matías Zagazeta, who embarked on his second season in the championship after coming 25th with Jenzer Motorsport in 2024. Alpine Academy driver Nicola Lacorte also joined the team, graduating from FRECA after coming 21st with Trident in 2024. DAMS' lineup was completed by 2024 Eurocup-3 champion Christian Ho.

Two of the three drivers that competed for the departing Jenzer Motorsport team joined other FIA F3 teams, with Wurz joining Trident and Zagazeta signing with DAMS. Max Esterson left the series to join Trident in Formula 2.

==== In-season changes ====
Nikita Bedrin left AIX Racing after the first round to prioritise his FRECA campaign. For the second round in Bahrain, his seat was filled by reigning Italian F4 Champion and Formula Regional Middle East runner-up Freddie Slater.

Ahead of the third round, reigning Euroformula Open Champion Brad Benavides was announced to take over the No. 28 AIX Racing entry for the rest of the season. This marked his return to the championship where he last competed in 2022. The team saw another change in its lineup, as Javier Sagrera was replaced by James Hedley, who competed in one round last year with Jenzer Motorsport.

Joshua Dufek left Hitech TGR ahead of the fifth round at Barcelona. He was replaced by Jesse Carrasquedo Jr. for the next two rounds, who stepped up to FIA Formula 3 after previously competing in the Formula Regional category. Euroformula Open driver José Garfias also made his FIA Formula 3 debut, replacing James Hedley for the Barcelona round after Hedley sustained a hand injury in a crash during the previous round.

Following the conclusion of the Barcelona round, Nicola Lacorte received a one-round suspension after accumulating twelve penalty points on his licence. GB3 driver Nikita Johnson replaced him for the Spielberg round, making his debut in the championship.

Nikita Johnson joined Hitech TGR for the Silverstone round, making his second outing in FIA F3 after competing in the previous round with DAMS Lucas Oil. He replaced Jesse Carrasquedo Jr.

Freddie Slater joined Hitech TGR for the Spa-Francorchamps round, also making his second outing this season like Nikita Johnson, whom he replaced. Slater previously competed in the Sakhir round with AIX Racing.

Nikita Johnson returned to Hitech TGR for the Budapest round after a one-round absence, replacing Freddie Slater, who went on to compete in the Formula Regional European Championship. Johnson also competed in the season finale.

Ahead of the season finale, Euroformula Open driver Fernando Barrichello was announced to make his FIA F3 debut at Monza with AIX Racing in preparation for a full-season step up with the team in 2026. He replaced James Hedley, who moved to Van Amersfoort Racing to replace Santiago Ramos after the latter mutually parted ways with the team.

== Race calendar ==
Round	Circuit	Sprint race	Feature race
1	(Australia) Albert Park Circuit, Melbourne	15 March	16 March
2	Bahrain International Circuit, Sakhir	12 April	13 April
3	(Italy) Imola Circuit, Imola	17 May	18 May
4	Circuit de Monaco, Monaco	24 May	25 May
5	(Spain) Circuit de Barcelona-Catalunya, Montmeló	31 May	1 June
6	(Austria) Red Bull Ring, Spielberg	28 June	29 June
7	(United Kingdom) Silverstone Circuit, Silverstone	5 July	6 July
8	(Belgium) Circuit de Spa-Francorchamps, Stavelot	26 July	27 July
9	(Hungary) Hungaroring, Mogyoród	2 August	3 August
10	(Italy) Monza Circuit, Monza	6 September	7 September

=== Calendar changes ===
The Albert Park Circuit was the season opener for the first time in FIA Formula 3 history, a consequence of Formula One's Australian Grand Prix holding the opening round of the championship for the first time since 2019.

== Regulation changes ==
=== Technical regulations ===
The season saw the introduction of a brand new chassis and engine package. The Dallara F3 2019 chassis, which had been used by FIA Formula 3 since 2019, was replaced by the Dallara F3 2025.

== Season report ==
A three-day pre-season test was held from 19–21 February at the Circuit de Barcelona-Catalunya.

=== Round 1: Australia ===
At the opening round at Albert Park Circuit, FIA Formula 3 debutant Rafael Câmara set the fastest qualifying time to take feature race pole position, with Noah Strømsted and Théophile Naël qualifying second and third respectively. Santiago Ramos qualified twelfth and therefore started from first place in the reverse-grid sprint race. He maintained his lead off the start line and after the safety car period when Câmara, James Wharton and Laurens van Hoepen collided. The race then ended under safety car conditions due to a late crash between Javier Sagrera and Bruno del Pino, allowing Ramos to hold the position and claim his first victory in the category. The podium was completed by Martinius Stenshorne in second and Roman Bilinski in third on his FIA Formula 3 debut.

Due to wet conditions, the feature race began with a rolling start after several formation laps behind the safety car. An incident on the first lap that left Nikola Tsolov and Callum Voisin stuck on the slippery grass necessitated the redeployment of the safety car. After racing resumed, the top seven qualifiers held their positions during the green flag running. A crash for Christian Ho on lap 13 caused another safety car period before the race was red-flagged and not resumed on lap 18 of 20. Pole-sitter Câmara thus took his first race win in the series, followed by his Trident teammate Strømsted in second and Naël in third. At the end of the first round, Câmara led the Drivers' Championship by nine points over Naël.

=== Round 2: Bahrain ===
Rafael Câmara claimed a second consecutive feature race pole position in qualifying at Bahrain International Circuit, with Callum Voisin qualifying second and Charlie Wurz third. Joshua Dufek started the sprint race from first place, but soon dropped down the order and later retired after a collision with Ivan Domingues. Series debutant Freddie Slater took the lead, having started third. Nikola Tsolov, who had improved from fifth at the start, challenged Slater for the lead and overtook him with eight laps remaining. Tsolov achieved his fourth victory in the category, followed by Slater in second and Tuukka Taponen in third, both claiming their first FIA Formula 3 podiums.

Pole-sitter Câmara lost the lead of the feature race to Callum Voisin at the first corner. The two drivers traded positions over the following laps, but Câmara later reclaimed the lead and built a gap to Voisin behind. Câmara went on to take his second consecutive feature race victory, followed by Voisin. Tim Tramnitz, who started the race 13th, gained multiple places and overtook Tuukka Taponen in the closing laps to claim the final podium place. Câmara's victory extended his lead in the Drivers' Championship to 26 points over second-placed Tramnitz.

=== Round 3: Italy (Imola) ===
Rafael Câmara achieved his third consecutive pole position at Imola Circuit, followed in qualifying by Santiago Ramos and Noah Strømsted. Câmara became the first driver since Logan Sargeant to achieve three consecutive pole positions in FIA F3, while also becoming the first driver to achieve three consecutive pole positions in his first three rounds in the category. Bruno del Pino started the sprint race from pole position, but was overtaken by teammate Tim Tramnitz on the third lap. Racing was suspended by a safety car shortly afterwards when Nicola Marinangeli's car came to a stop with a detached wheel. The safety car was then brought out again after the restart when Matías Zagazeta became beached in the gravel. Between the two suspensions, third-placed Mari Boya dropped positions and ultimately retired with a mechanical issue, promoting Nikola Tsolov to a podium position. Tramnitz claimed his first victory of the year, followed by del Pino with his first FIA F3 podium and Tsolov in third.

In the feature race, Câmara lost the lead to Ramos at the first corner, but later retook the position on lap four. Ramos followed closely behind Câmara for most of the race before regaining the lead with three laps remaining. Strømsted, meanwhile, had lost positions at the start, but recovered in the closing laps. He overtook Câmara for second place but was unable to catch Ramos before the end of the race, finishing narrowly behind. Ramos took his – and Van Amersfoort Racing's – first feature race victory in the series. Câmara retained his lead in the championship, which was reduced to 21 points over teammate Strømsted.

=== Round 4: Monaco ===
Qualifying at the Circuit de Monaco uses a split group system, where two groups, A and B, of fifteen cars each, conduct their qualifying sessions separately. Nikola Tsolov, in Group A, set the fastest overall time to take his first pole position in the series. Roman Bilinski topped Group B to qualify second and Mari Boya was third. Alessandro Giusti started the sprint race from pole position, but a slow start dropped him behind Martinius Stenshorne, Tuukka Taponen and Laurens van Hoepen. Several incidents on lap one eliminated five drivers from the race (including James Hedley, who was ruled out of Sunday's race) and brought out the safety car. Stenshorne took the chequered flag to achieve his second victory in the category, followed by teammates Taponen and van Hoepen.

Feature race pole-sitter Tsolov built a gap ahead of second place in the opening laps. Racing was interrupted twice by the safety car, firstly after an accident for Noel León and secondly after a collision between Nicola Marinangeli and Brando Badoer. Tsolov went unchallenged at the restarts and claimed a record fifth victory in the category, followed by Bilinski in second and Boya in third. Rafael Câmara – who retired from the race after his wheel detached – retained his lead in the Drivers' Championship by 13 points over Tim Tramnitz, who finished fifth in both races.

=== Round 5: Spain ===
Rafael Câmara took his fourth pole position in five rounds at the Circuit de Barcelona-Catalunya, qualifying ahead of Nikola Tsolov and Laurens van Hoepen. On the opening lap of the sprint race, the drivers who started in the top three (Roman Bilinski, Martinius Stenshorne and Tim Tramnitz) collided, causing race-ending damage for all three cars and allowing sixth-place starter Ivan Domingues into the lead. Tuukka Taponen and championship leader Câmara were also eliminated from the race in a separate incident when Taponen stalled at the start and Câmara collided with his rear. Santiago Ramos and Tsolov, who started eighth and eleventh respectively, made overtakes and benefited from the early-race collisions and late-race retirement of second-placed Noah Strømsted to finish on the podium. Domingues crossed the line to take the first victory of his racing career.

In the feature race, a slow start from Tsolov dropped him outside the top three and promoted Van Hoepen and Théophile Naël into second and third respectively, whilst polesitter Câmara was unchallenged at the front. A collision between Bilinski and José Garfias caused a safety car period in the early laps. The safety car was deployed again in the closing laps when Nicola Lacorte collided with the rear of Brando Badoer, an incident that caused Lacorte to receive a race ban for accumulation of penalty points. Naël overtook Van Hoepen for second place at the restart, who then lost another position to Alessandro Giusti on the final lap. Câmara achieved his third victory of the season, followed by Naël and Giusti, who claimed his first podium finish in the series. Câmara's win extended his lead in the championship to 26 points over second-placed Tsolov.

=== Round 6: Austria ===
Nikola Tsolov claimed a second pole position in qualifying at the Red Bull Ring, followed by Brad Benavides in second and Noah Strømsted third. James Wharton started the sprint race from the front. Despite a battle for position between the two in the closing laps, Wharton led the entire race distance with Alessandro Giusti in second; Wharton's victory was his first podium finish in the category. Charlie Wurz had started third but was hit and spun round by Brando Badoer, causing Wurz's retirement and the deployment of the safety car. Ugo Ugochukwu was thus promoted to third place, but was later penalised for leaving the track and gaining an advantage during his defence against Tsolov. Tsolov, who started the race 12th, therefore inherited the final podium position.

Tsolov was unchallenged at the start of the feature race and soon built a gap behind. Benavides quickly dropped positions on the opening lap whilst championship leader Câmara, who started seventh, soon passed Benavides and Strømsted to run second. Meanwhile, Martinius Stenshorne and Tim Tramnitz, who started 15th and 17th respectively, made progress through the field and overtook Câmara – who was struggling with tyre degradation – before the end of the race. Tsolov crossed the line first, followed by Stenshorne and Tramnitz. However, Tsolov was later disqualified from the race for excessive plank wear, handing Stenshorne his second victory of the year and promoting Mari Boya, who started 14th, to the podium. The results left Câmara in the lead of the championship by 24 points over Tramnitz.

=== Round 7: United Kingdom ===
Nikola Tsolov took his third pole position in four rounds in qualifying at Silverstone Circuit, with Ugo Ugochukwu qualifying second and championship leader Câmara third. Tasanapol Inthraphuvasak started the sprint race from first place. The virtual safety car was briefly deployed in the opening laps after a collision between Tsolov and Brando Badoer eliminated Badoer from the race. Théophile Naël overtook Inthraphuvasak for the lead but later relinquished the position as the overtake was completed off-track. Naël was then passed by Martinius Stenshorne, and with two laps remaining, ninth-placed starter Mari Boya overtook both Naël and Laurens van Hoepen in one corner to take third place. Inthraphuvasak claimed his first Formula 3 victory, followed by Stenshorne and Boya on the podium.

The feature race took place in wet conditions, however most of the frontrunners elected to start the race on slick tyres. Fourth-placed Boya was the highest-qualifying wet tyre runner and immediately took the lead at the first corner, with Naël and Noel León following to complete the top three. The rain later intensified, forcing the slick tyre runners to pit for wet tyres and fall further behind. At the halfway point of the race, Louis Sharp spun and beached his car in the gravel, causing the deployment of the safety car. The race was then red-flagged due to the conditions and not resumed. Boya achieved his first win of the season, with Naël and León second and third respectively. Rafael Câmara's three points from the sprint race extended his lead in the championship to 27 points ahead of Tramnitz, who failed to score at Silverstone.

=== Round 8: Belgium ===
Brad Benavides took pole position, his first in the series, at the Circuit de Spa-Francorchamps. Rafael Câmara and Callum Voisin qualified second and third respectively. Freddie Slater started the sprint race from pole position, but was overtaken by Noah Strømsted on lap three and was ultimately classified outside the points having received penalties for track limit violations. Strømsted went on to claim his first victory in the category, followed by Ugo Ugochukwu and Charlie Wurz, who both took their first FIA Formula 3 podiums.

Due to wet conditions, the formation lap of the feature race started behind the safety car. However, the session was then red-flagged due to multiple accidents before the race could be started. A second attempt to start the race was made 40 minutes later, but this was abandoned due to poor visibility. No points were awarded, except Benavides's points for pole position. At the conclusion of the round, Câmara held a 28-point lead in the championship with Nikola Tsolov in second.

=== Round 9: Hungary ===
Rafael Câmara claimed his fifth pole position of the year in qualifying at the Hungaroring; Mari Boya qualified second and Tuukka Taponen was third. The sprint race began with Tasanapol Inthraphuvasak on pole. First-lap contact between Ugo Ugochukwu and Alessandro Giusti in a battle for fourth place caused Giusti's retirement and brought out the safety car. When racing resumed, Ugochukwu quickly made overtakes, passing James Wharton and James Hedley to take second place. After another safety car period caused by a collision between Théophile Naël and Noel León, Charlie Wurz also passed Wharton and Hedley in the closing laps to claim the final podium position. Inthraphuvasak led the entire race distance to win for the second time in 2025.

Câmara led a rolling feature race start in wet conditions. Seventh-place starter Ugochukwu gained places in the early laps until a collision with fourth-placed Gerrard Xie eliminated both drivers. The top three drivers held their positions from start to finish; Câmara took his fourth victory of the season, with Boya and Taponen completing the podium places. Boya's result promoted him to second place in the championship and dropped Nikola Tsolov to third, despite Tsolov salvaging a sixth-place finish from 21st on the grid. Câmara's win gave him a 48-point advantage over Boya at the top of the standings, an unassailable lead with one round remaining. Câmara thus became the 2025 Drivers' Champion, the third consecutively for a Trident driver and the first to do so with a round to go. The Teams' Championship was still undecided, with Trident holding a 19-point lead over Campos Racing.

=== Round 10: Italy (Monza) ===
As in the fourth round in Monaco, qualifying for the final round at Monza Circuit featured two separate sessions of fifteen cars each. Brad Benavides took his second pole position of the season, followed by Ugo Ugochukwu and Noel León, whilst champion Câmara had his time deleted for a track limit violation, dropping him to last place. Laurens van Hoepen started on pole for the sprint race, but was overtaken by Martinius Stenshorne on the opening lap. Both drivers were later passed by Tim Tramnitz, who started third, and Roman Bilinski, who had progressed from seventh on the grid. Tramnitz crossed the finish line in first place, but was later given a time penalty for a breach in relation to the start-up procedure, which demoted him outside of the top ten. Bilinski therefore inherited his first victory in the series, with Stenshorne in second and Van Hoepen promoted to the podium. Trident's lead in the Teams' Championship over Campos Racing now stood at 16 points going into the final race.

In the feature race, front-row starters Benavides and Ugochukwu fought for the lead before Ugochukwu spun and beached his car in the gravel on lap seven of 22, bringing out the safety car. Nikola Tsolov – who had started in fifth but overtook León and Tasanapol Inthraphuvasak to run second – briefly overtook Benavides for the lead but soon lost the position again. Tsolov and Inthraphuvasak then began to fight over second place before Inthraphuvasak made an overtake on both Tsolov and Benavides in one corner on lap 17. Inthraphuvasak went on to take his third win of the season, followed by Tsolov to achieve a 1-2 finish for Campos Racing. Benavides missed out on his first FIA Formula 3 podium, having been passed by León on the penultimate lap.

Trident drivers Câmara and Noah Strømsted, who started 30th and 19th respectively, made recovery drives to fifth and sixth, respectively. However, this was not enough to prevent Campos Racing from claiming their first Teams' Championship in the series, with their result promoting them to first place by 11 points, marking the third consecutive year in which Trident won the Drivers' Championship but failed to win the Teams' Championship.

== Results and standings ==
=== Season summary ===
Round		Circuit	Pole position	Fastest lap	Winning driver	Winning team	Report
1	SR	(Australia) Albert Park Circuit		(Norway) Martinius Stenshorne	(Mexico) Santiago Ramos	(Netherlands) Van Amersfoort Racing	Report
1	FR	(Australia) Albert Park Circuit	(Brazil) Rafael Câmara	(Brazil) Rafael Câmara	(Brazil) Rafael Câmara	(Italy) Trident	Report
2	SR	Bahrain International Circuit		(United Kingdom) Freddie Slater	(Bulgaria) Nikola Tsolov	(Spain) Campos Racing	Report
2	FR	Bahrain International Circuit	(Brazil) Rafael Câmara	(Brazil) Rafael Câmara	(Brazil) Rafael Câmara	(Italy) Trident	Report
3	SR	(Italy) Imola Circuit		(Denmark) Noah Strømsted	(Germany) Tim Tramnitz	(Netherlands) MP Motorsport	Report
3	FR	(Italy) Imola Circuit	(Brazil) Rafael Câmara	(Denmark) Noah Strømsted	(Mexico) Santiago Ramos	(Netherlands) Van Amersfoort Racing	Report
4	SR	Circuit de Monaco		(Norway) Martinius Stenshorne	(Norway) Martinius Stenshorne	(United Kingdom) Hitech TGR	Report
4	FR	Circuit de Monaco	(Bulgaria) Nikola Tsolov	(Bulgaria) Nikola Tsolov	(Bulgaria) Nikola Tsolov	(Spain) Campos Racing	Report
5	SR	(Spain) Circuit de Barcelona-Catalunya		(Denmark) Noah Strømsted (Note: Noah Strømsted set the fastest lap but did not finish in the top ten, so he was ineligible to score the point for it. Santiago Ramos scored the point for setting the fastest lap among those finishing in the top ten.)	(Portugal) Ivan Domingues	(Netherlands) Van Amersfoort Racing	Report
5	FR	(Spain) Circuit de Barcelona-Catalunya	(Brazil) Rafael Câmara	(Brazil) Rafael Câmara	(Brazil) Rafael Câmara	(Italy) Trident	Report
6	SR	(Austria) Red Bull Ring		(Norway) Martinius Stenshorne	(Australia) James Wharton	(France) ART Grand Prix	Report
6	FR	(Austria) Red Bull Ring	(Bulgaria) Nikola Tsolov	(Spain) Mari Boya	(Norway) Martinius Stenshorne (Note: Nikola Tsolov originally won the race, but was later disqualified as the front plank of his car was below the minimum thickness required. Martinius Stenshorne, initially classified second, inherited the win.)	(United Kingdom) Hitech TGR	Report
7	SR	(United Kingdom) Silverstone Circuit		(France) Théophile Naël (Note: Théophile Naël set the fastest lap but did not finish in the top ten, so he was ineligible to score the point for it. Tasanapol Inthraphuvasak scored the point for setting the fastest lap among those finishing in the top ten.)	(Thailand) Tasanapol Inthraphuvasak	(Spain) Campos Racing	Report
7	FR	(United Kingdom) Silverstone Circuit	(Bulgaria) Nikola Tsolov	(Netherlands) Laurens van Hoepen	(Spain) Mari Boya	(Spain) Campos Racing	Report
8	SR	(Belgium) Circuit de Spa-Francorchamps		(Denmark) Noah Strømsted	(Denmark) Noah Strømsted	(Italy) Trident	Report
8	FR	(Belgium) Circuit de Spa-Francorchamps	(United States) Brad Benavides	Race abandoned (Note: The race was suspended and not resumed due to adverse weather conditions. With no laps completed under green flag conditions, regulations dictated that no points would be awarded. No final classification was published, and the race was declared abandoned.)			Report
9	SR	(Hungary) Hungaroring		(Portugal) Ivan Domingues (Note: Ivan Domingues set the fastest lap but did not finish in the top ten, so he was ineligible to score the point for it. Ugo Ugochukwu scored the point for setting the fastest lap among those finishing in the top ten.)	(Thailand) Tasanapol Inthraphuvasak	(Spain) Campos Racing	Report
9	FR	(Hungary) Hungaroring	(Brazil) Rafael Câmara	(Mexico) Noel León (Note: Noel León set the fastest lap but did not finish in the top ten, so he was ineligible to score the point for it. Mari Boya scored the point for setting the fastest lap among those finishing in the top ten.)	(Brazil) Rafael Câmara	(Italy) Trident	Report
10	SR	(Italy) Monza Circuit		(Brazil) Rafael Câmara (Note: Rafael Câmara set the fastest lap but did not finish in the top ten, so he was ineligible to score the point for it. Tim Tramnitz originally scored the point for setting the fastest lap among those finishing in the top ten, but later received a ten-second time penalty for a breach in relation to the start-up procedure, dropping him out of the top ten. As a result, Théophile Naël was awarded the point.)	(Poland) Roman Bilinski (Note: Tim Tramnitz originally won the race, but later received a ten-second time penalty for a breach in relation to the start-up procedure. Roman Bilinski, initially classified second, inherited the win.)	(New Zealand) Rodin Motorsport	Report
10	FR	(Italy) Monza Circuit	(United States) Brad Benavides	(France) Alessandro Giusti	(Thailand) Tasanapol Inthraphuvasak	(Spain) Campos Racing	Report

=== Scoring system ===
Points were awarded to the top ten classified finishers in both races. (Note: In the event of a race ending prematurely, the number of points paying positions could be reduced, depending on how much of the race has been completed.) The pole-sitter in the feature race also received two points, and one point was given to the driver who set the fastest lap in both the feature and sprint races, provided that driver finished inside the top ten. If the driver who set the fastest lap was classified outside the top ten, the point was given to the driver who set the fastest lap of those inside the top ten. No extra points were awarded to the pole-sitter in the sprint race as the grid for it was set by reversing the top twelve qualifiers.

Sprint race points

Points were awarded to the top ten classified finishers. A bonus point was awarded to the driver who set the fastest lap and finished in the top ten.

Position	1st	2nd	3rd	4th	5th	6th	7th	8th	9th	10th	FL
Points	10	9	8	7	6	5	4	3	2	1	1

Feature race points

Points were awarded to the top ten classified finishers. Bonus points were awarded to the pole-sitter and to the driver who set the fastest lap and finished in the top ten.

Position	1st	2nd	3rd	4th	5th	6th	7th	8th	9th	10th	Pole	FL
Points	25	18	15	12	10	8	6	4	2	1	2	1

=== Drivers' Championship standings ===
Pos.	Driver	ALB (Australia)		BHR (Bahrain)		IMO (Italy)		MON (Monaco)		CAT (Spain)		RBR (Austria)		SIL (United Kingdom)		SPA (Belgium)		HUN (Hungary)		MNZ (Italy)		Points
Pos.	Driver	SR	FR	SR	FR	SR	FR	SR	FR	SR	FR	SR	FR	SR	FR (Note: As more than 50% but less than 75% of the scheduled race distance was completed, reduced points were awarded on a 19–14–12–10–8–6–4–3–2–1 basis to the top ten finishers.)	SR	FR (Note: The race was suspended and not resumed due to adverse weather conditions. With no laps completed under green flag conditions, regulations dictated that no points would be awarded. No final classification was published, and the race was declared abandoned. Only points for pole position were awarded.)	SR	FR	SR	FR	Points
1	(Brazil) Rafael Câmara	Ret	1^{P F}	12	1^{P F}	11	3^{P}	7	Ret	Ret	1^{P F}	9	5	8	22	5	C	8	1^{P}	25	5	166
2	(Bulgaria) Nikola Tsolov	8	Ret	1	5	3	9	24	1^{P F}	3	5	3	DSQ^{P}	29	20^{P}	4	C	15	6	22	2	124
3	(Spain) Mari Boya	13	17	15	8	Ret	5	8	3	7	22	5	3^{F}	3	1	14	C	7	2^{F}	5	9	116
4	(Germany) Tim Tramnitz	NC	5	6	3	1	6	5	5	Ret	7	6	2	11	18	12	C	13	13	18	10	94
5	(Norway) Martinius Stenshorne	2^{F}	8	5	18	13	11	1^{F}	8	Ret	9	7^{F}	1	2	17	7	C	22	26	2	21	89
6	(Denmark) Noah Strømsted	Ret	2	10	6	6^{F}	2^{F}	Ret	18	Ret	8	20	7	13	28	1^{F}	C	17	12	8	6	84
7	(Thailand) Tasanapol Inthraphuvasak	4	7	18	16	19	17	23	12	9	11	4	15	1^{F}	13	6	C	1	10	12	1	74
8	(France) Théophile Naël	7	3	Ret	15	20	26	16	22†	5	2	11	10	19	2	22	C	9	5	10^{F}	18	72
9	(Finland) Tuukka Taponen	14	20	3	4	7	4	2	7	Ret	19	Ret	20	18	10	18	C	11	3	11	15	67
10	(France) Alessandro Giusti	11	25	7	7	10	7	4	10	6	3	2	12	12	14	10	C	Ret	9	6	8^{F}	67
11	(Poland) Roman Bilinski	3	9	20	13	5	8	11	2	Ret	Ret	15	23	10	4	13	C	14	14	1	7	65
12	(Netherlands) Laurens van Hoepen	Ret	12	16	12	17	10	3	6	4	4	12	DSQ	4	7^{F}	23	C	19	8	3	23	60
13	(Austria) Charlie Wurz	Ret	6	9	11	23	16	6	Ret	14	13	Ret	6	9	16	3	C	3	4	Ret	Ret	53
14	(United Kingdom) Callum Voisin	9	Ret	4	2	26	18	10	4	16	10	8	8	22	19	17	C	18	15	7	12	52
15	(Mexico) Santiago Ramos	1	16	Ret	14	27†	1	Ret	16	2^{F}	Ret	13	27	15	8	21	C	12	19			48
16	(United States) Ugo Ugochukwu	12	10	Ret	27	8	14	13	14	22	20	16	4	5	21	2	C	2^{F}	Ret	9	Ret	43
17	(Mexico) Noel León	10	13	11	17	9	28†	Ret	Ret	10	18	10	11	7	3	15	C	Ret	17	19	3	36
18	(Australia) James Wharton	Ret	21	13	28	22	13	21	11	8	16	1	14	16	6	20	C	5	27†	16	16	25
19	(Portugal) Ivan Domingues	21	19	Ret	19	25	Ret	Ret	20	1	6	Ret	21	17	11	29	C	24	24	Ret	Ret	18
20	(United States) Brad Benavides					12	24	12	Ret	15	24	Ret	9	14	Ret	19	C^{P}	Ret	Ret	26	4^{P}	18
21	(Italy) Nikita Bedrin	6	4																			17
22	(Singapore) Christian Ho	15	Ret	8	10	21	21	15	13	11	14	Ret	24	6	5	28	C	20	20	23	13	17
23	(Spain) Bruno del Pino	Ret	23	19	9	2	27	22	NC	12	17	22	19	20	9	8	C	25	25	14	11	16
24	(Peru) Matías Zagazeta	5	22	17	29	Ret	22	17	15	18	15	17	18	25	24	Ret	C	26	16	4	Ret	13
25	(Italy) Brando Badoer	19	26	22	21	16	19	20	Ret	17	Ret	23	Ret	Ret	12	9	C	6	7	27	14	13
26	(New Zealand) Louis Sharp	18	14	14	23	4	12	9	9	13	12	Ret	16	21	Ret	25	C	16	11	21	Ret	11
27	(United Kingdom) Freddie Slater			2^{F}	Ret											26	C					10
28	(United Kingdom) James Hedley					18	23	Ret	WD			DSQ	26	26	27	24	C	4	22	24	17	7
29	(China) Gerrard Xie	16	18	21	26	24	20	18	19	20	21	21	17	24	25	11	C	10	Ret	15	Ret	1
30	(Austria) Joshua Dufek	22	11	Ret	22	14	15	14	17													0
31	(Mexico) Jesse Carrasquedo Jr.									23	25	14	13									0
32	(United States) Nikita Johnson											18	22	27	23			23	21	13	20	0
33	(Italy) Nicola Lacorte	17	24	Ret	20	15	25	Ret	Ret	19	26†			23	15	16	C	Ret	18	28	22	0
34	(Spain) Javier Sagrera	Ret	15	23	24																	0
35	(Brazil) Fernando Barrichello																			17	Ret	0
36	(Italy) Nicola Marinangeli	20	27	Ret	25	Ret	Ret	19	21	21	23	19	25	28	26	27	C	21	23	20	19	0
37	(Mexico) José Garfias									24†	Ret											0
Pos.	Driver	SR	FR	SR	FR	SR	FR	SR	FR	SR	FR	SR	FR	SR	FR	SR	FR	SR	FR	SR	FR	Points
Pos.	Driver	ALB (Australia)		BHR (Bahrain)		IMO (Italy)		MON (Monaco)		CAT (Spain)		RBR (Austria)		SIL (United Kingdom)		SPA (Belgium)		HUN (Hungary)		MNZ (Italy)		Points

Key
Colour	Result
Gold	Winner
Silver	Second place
Bronze	Third place
Green	Other points position
Blue	Other classified position
Blue	Not classified, finished (NC)
Purple	Not classified, retired (Ret)
Red	Did not qualify (DNQ)
Black	Disqualified (DSQ)
White	Did not start (DNS)
White	Race cancelled (C)
Blank	Did not practice (DNP)
Blank	Excluded (EX)
Blank	Did not arrive (DNA)
Blank	Withdrawn (WD)
Blank	Did not enter (empty cell)
Annotation	Meaning
P	Pole position
F	Fastest lap

† – Driver did not finish the race, but was classified as he completed more than 90% of the race distance.

=== Teams' Championship standings ===
Pos.	Team	ALB (Australia)		BHR (Bahrain)		IMO (Italy)		MON (Monaco)		CAT (Spain)		RBR (Austria)		SIL (United Kingdom)		SPA (Belgium)		HUN (Hungary)		MNZ (Italy)		Points
Pos.	Team	SR	FR	SR	FR	SR	FR	SR	FR	SR	FR	SR	FR	SR	FR	SR	FR	SR	FR	SR	FR	Points
1	(Spain) Campos Racing	4	7	1	5	3	5	8	1^{P F}	3	5	3	3^{F}	1^{F}	1	4	C	1	2^{F}	5	1	314
1	(Spain) Campos Racing	8	17	15	8	19	9	23	3	7	11	4	15	3	13	6	C	7	6	12	2	314
1	(Spain) Campos Racing	13	Ret	18	16	Ret	17	24	12	9	22	5	DSQ^{P}	29	20^{P}	14	C	15	10	22	9	314
2	(Italy) Trident	Ret	1^{P F}	9	1^{P F}	6^{F}	2^{F}	6	18	14	1^{P F}	9	5	8	16	1^{F}	C	3	1^{P}	8	5	303
2	(Italy) Trident	Ret	2	10	6	11	3^{P}	7	Ret	Ret	8	20	6	9	22	3	C	8	4	25	6	303
2	(Italy) Trident	Ret	6	12	11	23	16	Ret	Ret	Ret	13	Ret	7	13	28	5	C	17	12	Ret	Ret	303
3	(Netherlands) MP Motorsport	11	5	6	3	1	6	4	5	6	3	2	2	11	9	8	C	13	9	6	8^{F}	177
3	(Netherlands) MP Motorsport	NC	23	7	7	2	7	5	10	12	7	6	12	12	14	10	C	25	13	14	10	177
3	(Netherlands) MP Motorsport	Ret	25	19	9	10	27	22	NC	Ret	17	22	19	20	18	12	C	Ret	25	18	11	177
4	(France) ART Grand Prix	14	12	3	4	7	4	2	6	4	4	1	14	4	6	18	C	5	3	3	15	152
4	(France) ART Grand Prix	Ret	20	13	12	17	10	3	7	8	16	12	20	16	7^{F}	20	C	11	8	11	16	152
4	(France) ART Grand Prix	Ret	21	16	28	22	13	21	11	Ret	19	Ret	DSQ	18	10	23	C	19	27†	16	23	152
5	(Netherlands) Van Amersfoort Racing	1	3	Ret	14	20	1	16	16	1	2	11	10	15	2	21	C	9	5	10^{F}	17	138
5	(Netherlands) Van Amersfoort Racing	7	16	Ret	15	25	26	Ret	20	2^{F}	6	13	21	17	8	22	C	12	19	24	18	138
5	(Netherlands) Van Amersfoort Racing	21	19	Ret	19	27†	Ret	Ret	22†	5	Ret	Ret	27	19	11	29	C	24	24	Ret	Ret	138
6	(New Zealand) Rodin Motorsport	3	9	4	2	4	8	9	2	13	10	8	8	10	4	13	C	14	11	1	7	128
6	(New Zealand) Rodin Motorsport	9	14	14	13	5	12	10	4	16	12	15	16	21	19	17	C	16	14	7	12	128
6	(New Zealand) Rodin Motorsport	18	Ret	20	23	26	18	11	9	Ret	Ret	Ret	23	22	Ret	25	C	18	15	21	Ret	128
7	(Italy) Prema Racing	10	10	11	17	8	14	13	14	10	18	10	4	5	3	2	C	2^{F}	7	9	3	92
7	(Italy) Prema Racing	12	13	22	21	9	19	20	Ret	17	20	16	11	7	12	9	C	6	17	19	14	92
7	(Italy) Prema Racing	19	26	Ret	27	16	28†	Ret	Ret	22	Ret	23	Ret	Ret	21	15	C	Ret	Ret	27	Ret	92
8	(United Kingdom) Hitech TGR	2^{F}	8	5	18	13	11	1^{F}	8	20	9	7^{F}	1	2	17	7	C	10	21	2	20	90
8	(United Kingdom) Hitech TGR	16	11	21	22	14	15	14	17	23	21	14	13	24	23	11	C	22	26	13	21	90
8	(United Kingdom) Hitech TGR	22	18	Ret	26	24	20	18	19	Ret	25	21	17	27	25	26	C	23	Ret	15	Ret	90
9	(United Arab Emirates) AIX Racing	6	4	2^{F}	24	12	23	12	21	15	23	19	9	14	26	19	C^{P}	4	22	17	4^{P}	52
9	(United Arab Emirates) AIX Racing	20	15	23	25	18	24	19	Ret	21	24	Ret	25	26	27	24	C	21	23	20	19	52
9	(United Arab Emirates) AIX Racing	Ret	27	Ret	Ret	Ret	Ret	Ret	WD	24†	Ret	DSQ	26	28	Ret	27	C	Ret	Ret	26	Ret	52
10	(France) DAMS Lucas Oil	5	22	8	10	15	21	15	13	11	14	17	18	6	5	16	C	20	16	4	13	30
10	(France) DAMS Lucas Oil	15	24	17	20	21	22	17	15	18	15	18	22	23	15	28	C	26	18	23	22	30
10	(France) DAMS Lucas Oil	17	Ret	Ret	29	Ret	25	Ret	Ret	19	26†	Ret	24	25	24	Ret	C	Ret	20	28	Ret	30
Pos.	Team	SR	FR	SR	FR	SR	FR	SR	FR	SR	FR	SR	FR	SR	FR	SR	FR	SR	FR	SR	FR	Points
Pos.	Team	ALB (Australia)		BHR (Bahrain)		IMO (Italy)		MON (Monaco)		CAT (Spain)		RBR (Austria)		SIL (United Kingdom)		SPA (Belgium)		HUN (Hungary)		MNZ (Italy)		Points

Key
Colour	Result
Gold	Winner
Silver	Second place
Bronze	Third place
Green	Other points position
Blue	Other classified position
Blue	Not classified, finished (NC)
Purple	Not classified, retired (Ret)
Red	Did not qualify (DNQ)
Black	Disqualified (DSQ)
White	Did not start (DNS)
White	Race cancelled (C)
Blank	Did not practice (DNP)
Blank	Excluded (EX)
Blank	Did not arrive (DNA)
Blank	Withdrawn (WD)
Blank	Did not enter (empty cell)
Annotation	Meaning
P	Pole position
F	Fastest lap

† – Driver did not finish the race, but was classified as he completed more than 90% of the race distance.

Rows are not related to the drivers: within each team, individual race standings are sorted purely based on the final classification in the race (not by total points scored in the event, which includes points awarded for fastest lap and pole position).
