= Gerrard Xie =

Chinese racing driver (born 2006)

- 謝咏霖
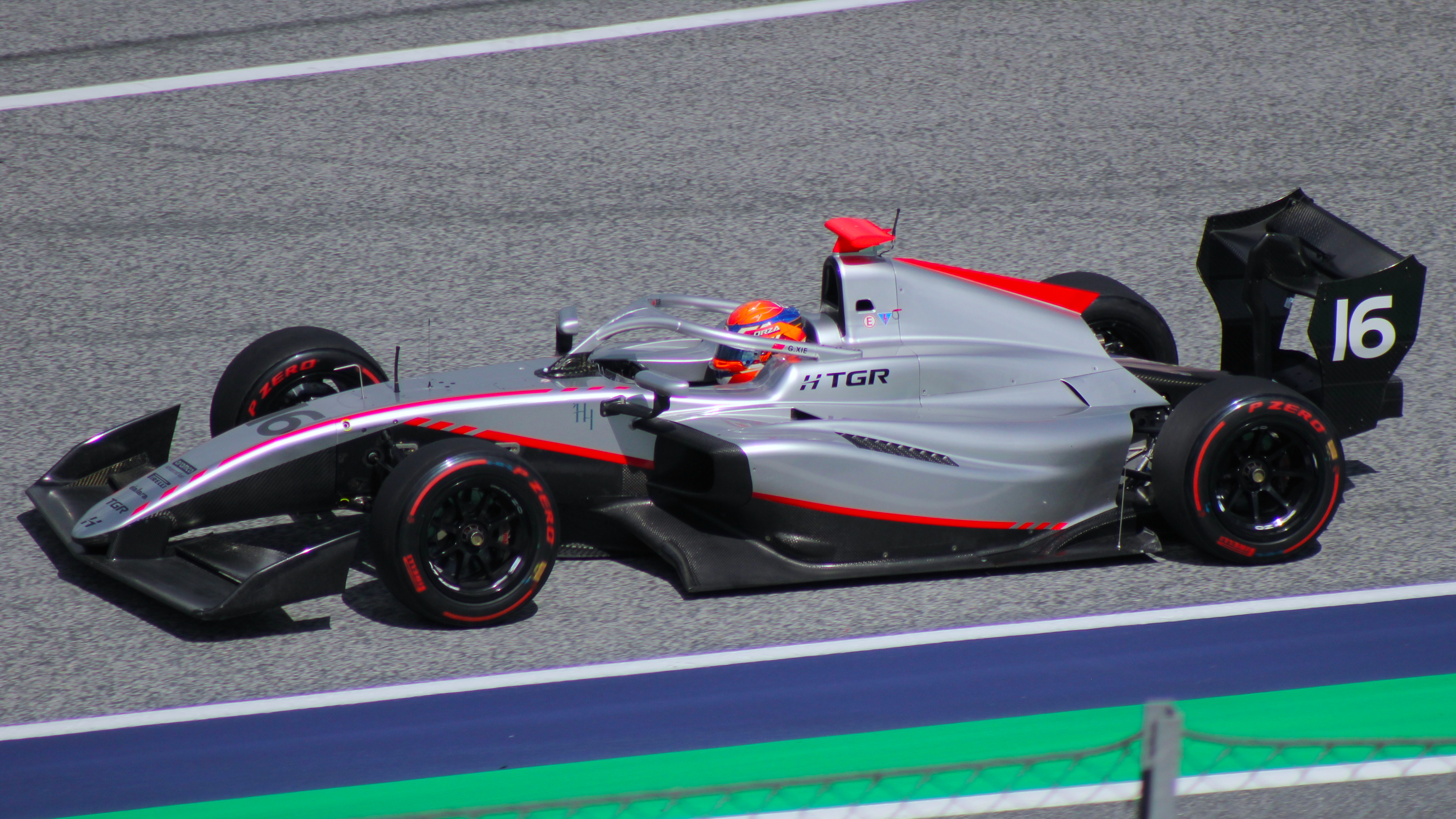
- Xie driving the Dallara F3 2025 during the 2025 Spielberg Formula 3 round
- Nationality: (China) Chinese
- Born: Xie Wing Lam; 24 September 2006 (age 20) Hong Kong

FIA Formula 3 Championship career
- Debut season: 2025
- Current team: DAMS Lucas Oil
- Car number: 31
- Former teams: Hitech TGR
- Starts: 35
- Wins: 1
- Podiums: 2
- Poles: 0
- Fastest laps: 0
- Best finish: 22nd in 2026

Previous series
- 2026; 2024; 2024; 2023–24; 2023–24; 2022; 2022: FR Middle East Trophy; FR Oceania; Eurocup-3; GB3; Euroformula Open; F4 Chinese; Formula Renault Super Challenge

Championship titles
- 2022 2022: F4 Chinese; Formula Renault Super Challenge
- Statistics up to date as of 15 September 2026.

Chinese name
- Traditional Chinese: 謝咏霖
- Simplified Chinese: 谢咏霖
Transcriptions
Standard Mandarin
- Hanyu Pinyin: Xiè Yǒnglín
Yue: Cantonese
- Jyutping: Ze6 Wing6 Lam4

Gerrard Xie Wing Lam (Chinese: 謝咏霖; Jyutping: Ze6 Wing6 Lam4; pinyin: Xiè Yǒnglín; born 24 September 2006), also known as Gerrard Xie Yonglin, is a Chinese racing driver who last competed in the FIA Formula 3 Championship for DAMS.

Xie previously raced in the GB3 Championship for Hitech Pulse-Eight and Hillspeed for the past two seasons, respectively. He was champion of the 2022 F4 Chinese Championship and the 2022 Formula Renault Super Challenge.

== Career ==
=== Karting ===
Born in Hong Kong but based in Shenzhen, Xie competed in karting across Europe and Asia from 2018 to 2021, though he often did not complete full seasons in Europe. He finished third in the 2020 IAME Asia Cup in the junior class.

=== Formula Renault ===
Xie made his car racing debut in the 2022 Formula Renault Super Challenge, driving for H-Star Racing. Entering from the second round onwards, he took pole position and won both races with the fastest lap in his debut round, and did the same again in the final and third round of the championship, taking the overall title, 32 points ahead of nearest rival Jason Wu.

=== Formula 4 ===
Xie competed in the 2022 F4 Chinese Championship with Smart Life Racing Team. He dominated the opening round at the Ningbo International Circuit, taking a double pole position and winning three of the four races, retiring from the fourth. At the second round, also at Ningbo, he took another double pole and won all four races, with fastest lap in each. After qualifying second behind Andy Chang, Xie held off Charles Leong to win the opening race of the 2022 Macau Grand Prix (the third round of the championship), and finished second in the main race, sealing the championship title in the process. In the final round of the season at Pingtan Street Circuit, Xie again took double pole position and won all four races with the fastest lap in each, to win the championship by over 160 points, the largest ever title-winning margin in a Chinese F4 season.

=== GB3 Championship ===
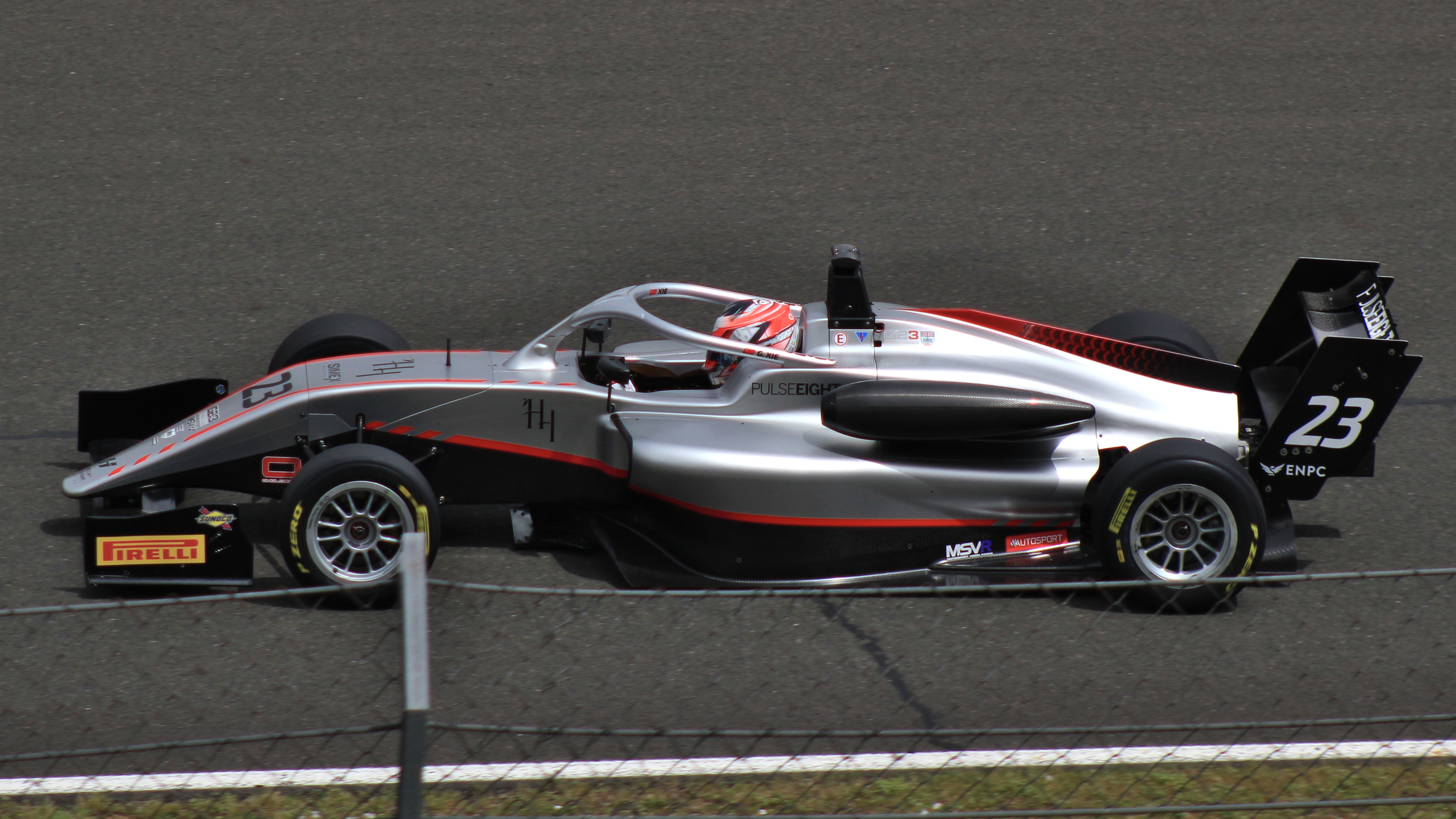
Xie driving at the Hungaroring during the 2024 GB3 Championship

==== 2023 ====
On 13 February 2023, it was announced that Xie would drive for Hillspeed in the 2023 GB3 Championship alongside Daniel Mavlyutov, with both drivers supported by the new Hitech GP Academy. Xie had a difficult season, but won the final race of the season at Donington Park. He finished 20th in the championship with 128 points.

==== 2024 ====
In 2024, Xie switched to Hitech Pulse-Eight for his second season in GB3.

=== Formula Regional ===
==== 2024 ====
Xie made his debut in the Formula Regional Oceania Championship in 2024, driving for M2 Competition. He took pole position by four tenths in Hampton Downs International Motorsport Park and had a win in Taupo Motorsport Park.

==== 2026 ====
At the start of 2026, Xie contested the first two rounds of the Formula Regional Middle East Trophy with R-ace GP.

=== FIA Formula 3 Championship ===
==== 2025 ====
In October 2024, Xie was announced to be joining the FIA Formula 3 Championship for 2025, continuing his relationship with Hitech TGR. he scored one points finish in the sprint race at Hungary, where he finished in tenth, and finished 29th in the standings

==== 2026 ====
Xie switched to DAMS Lucas Oil for the 2026 season, partnering Nicola Lacorte and Nandhavud Bhirombhakdi. He withdrew from the Madrid season finale after suffering a vertebrae injury during an airborne crash in the previous round in Monza.

== Karting record ==
=== Karting career summary ===
| Season | Series | Team | Position |
|---|---|---|---|
| 2018 | CIK-FIA Karting Academy Trophy | | 38th |
| 2019 | CIK-FIA Karting Academy Trophy | | 35th |
| 2019 | IAME Asia Cup — Junior | I.S Racing | 6th |
| 2019 | IAME Asia Final – Junior | I.S Racing | 5th |
| 2020 | IAME Asia Cup — Junior | I.S Racing | 3rd |
| 2021 | WSK Super Master Series — OK | | 71st |
| 2021 | WSK Euro Series — OK | | 34th |
| 2021 | Champions of the Future — OK | | 51st |
| 2021 | CIK-FIA European Championship — OK | Forza Racing | 41st |
| 2021 | WSK Open Cup — OK | | 36th |

=== Complete Macao International Kart Grand Prix results ===
| Year | Series | Team | Class | Pre-Final | Final |
|---|---|---|---|---|---|
| 2017 | Asian Karting Open Championship | Extreme Speedway Racing Team | Mini ROK | 6th | 5th |
| 2018 | Asian Karting Open Championship | IS Racing Team | Formula 125 Junior Open | ? | 5th |
| 2019 | Asian Karting Open Championship | IS Racing Team | Formula 125 Junior Open | 4th | 6th |

=== Complete Macau Asia Karting Festival results ===
| Year | Series | Team | Class | Final |
|---|---|---|---|---|
| 2018 | Asian Karting Open Championship | Explorer Racing Team | Formula 125 Open Junior | ? |
| 2019 | Asian Karting Open Championship | GV Motorsports | Formula 125 Open Junior | 1st |
| 2019 | China Karting Championship | GV Motorsports | Junior | 1st |

== Racing record ==
=== Racing career summary ===
| Season | Series | Team | Races | Wins | Poles | F/Laps | Podiums | Points | Position |
|---|---|---|---|---|---|---|---|---|---|
| 2022 | Formula Renault Super Challenge | H-Star Racing | 4 | 4 | 2 | 4 | 4 | 120 | **1st** |
| 2022 | F4 Chinese Championship | Smart Life Racing Team | 14 | 13 | 7 | 11 | 13 | 375 | **1st** |
| 2022 | Macau Grand Prix | Smart Life Racing Team | 2 | 1 | 1 | 0 | 2 | N/A | **2nd** |
| 2023 | GB3 Championship | Hillspeed | 22 | 1 | 0 | 1 | 1 | 128 | 20th |
| 2023 | Euroformula Open Championship | CryptoTower Racing Team | 3 | 0 | 0 | 0 | 0 | 8 | 18th |
| 2024 | Formula Regional Oceania Championship | M2 Competition | 14 | 1 | 1 | 0 | 2 | 205 | 7th |
| 2024 | GB3 Championship | Hitech Pulse-Eight | 23 | 1 | 2 | 0 | 3 | 261 | 7th |
| 2024 | Euroformula Open Championship | Team Motopark | 3 | 1 | 0 | 1 | 1 | 36 | 11th |
| 2024 | Eurocup-3 | Palou Motorsport | 0 | 0 | 0 | 0 | 0 | 0 | NC† |
| 2025 | FIA Formula 3 Championship | Hitech TGR | 19 | 0 | 0 | 0 | 0 | 1 | 29th |
| 2026 | Formula Regional Middle East Trophy | R-ace GP | 6 | 0 | 0 | 0 | 0 | 1 | 25th |
| 2026 | FIA Formula 3 Championship | DAMS Lucas Oil | 16 | 1 | 0 | 0 | 2 | 20 | 22nd |

^{†} As Xie was a guest driver, he was ineligible for points. * Season still in progress.

=== Complete F4 Chinese Championship results ===
(key) (Races in bold indicate pole position) (Races in italics indicate fastest lap)

| Year | Team | 1 | 2 | 3 | 4 | 5 | 6 | 7 | 8 | 9 | 10 | 11 | 12 | 13 | 14 | DC | Points |
|---|---|---|---|---|---|---|---|---|---|---|---|---|---|---|---|---|---|
| 2022 | Smart Life Racing Team | **NIC1**; **1**; 1 | NIC1; 2; 1 | **NIC1**; **3**; 1 | NIC1; 4 Ret | **NIC2**; **1**; 1 | NIC2; 2; 1 | **NIC2**; **3**; 1 | NIC2; 4; 1 | MAC; 1; 1 | **MAC**; **2**; 2 | **PSC**; **1**; 1 | PSC; 2; 1 | **PSC**; **3**; 1 | PSC; 4; 1 | 1st | 375 |

=== Complete Macau Grand Prix results ===
| Year | Team | Car | Qualifying | Quali Race | Main Race |
|---|---|---|---|---|---|
| 2022 | (China) Smart Life Racing Team | Mygale M14-F4 | **2nd** | **1st** | **2nd** |

=== Complete GB3 Championship results ===
(key) (Races in bold indicate pole position) (Races in italics indicate fastest lap)

| Year | Team | 1 | 2 | 3 | 4 | 5 | 6 | 7 | 8 | 9 | 10 | 11 | 12 | 13 | 14 | 15 | 16 | 17 | 18 | 19 | 20 | 21 | 22 | 23 | 24 | DC | Points |
|---|---|---|---|---|---|---|---|---|---|---|---|---|---|---|---|---|---|---|---|---|---|---|---|---|---|---|---|
| 2023 | Hillspeed | OUL; 1; 21 | OUL; 2 DNS | OUL; 3; 8^{9} | SIL1; 1; 17 | SIL1; 2; 14 | SIL1; 3; 17^{5} | SPA; 1; 5 | SPA; 2; 4 | SPA; 3; 14^{3} | SNE; 1; 17 | SNE; 2; 17 | SNE; 3; 17 | SIL2; 1; 17 | SIL2; 2; 17 | SIL2; 3 C | BRH; 1; 15 | BRH; 2; 20 | BRH; 3 Ret | ZAN; 1; 18 | ZAN; 2; 19 | ZAN; 3 Ret | DON; 1; 17 | DON; 2; 19 | DON; 3; 1^{2} | 20th | 128 |
| 2024 | Hitech Pulse-Eight | OUL; 1; 4 | OUL; 2; 5 | OUL; 3; 10 | SIL1; 1; 5 | SIL1; 2; 9 | SIL1; 3 C | SPA; 1 Ret | SPA; 2; 15 | SPA; 3; 2 | **HUN**; **1**; 1 | **HUN**; **2**; 19 | HUN; 3 Ret | ZAN; 1; 11 | ZAN; 2 Ret | ZAN; 3; 12 | SIL2; 1; 4 | SIL2; 2; 9 | SIL2; 3; 6^{4} | DON; 1; 2 | DON; 1; 6 | DON; 1; 9^{1} | BRH; 1 Ret | BRH; 2 Ret | BRH; 3; 7 | 7th | 261 |

=== Complete Euroformula Open Championship results ===
(key) (Races in bold indicate pole position) (Races in italics indicate fastest lap)

| Year | Team | 1 | 2 | 3 | 4 | 5 | 6 | 7 | 8 | 9 | 10 | 11 | 12 | 13 | 14 | 15 | 16 | 17 | 18 | 19 | 20 | 21 | 22 | 23 | 24 | DC | Points |
|---|---|---|---|---|---|---|---|---|---|---|---|---|---|---|---|---|---|---|---|---|---|---|---|---|---|---|---|
| 2023 | CryptoTower Racing Team | PRT; 1 | PRT; 2 | PRT; 3 | SPA; 1; 8 | SPA; 2; 8 | SPA; 3 Ret | HUN; 1 | HUN; 2 | HUN; 3 | LEC; 1 | LEC; 2 | LEC; 3 | RBR; 1 | RBR; 2 | RBR; 3 | MNZ; 1 | MNZ; 2 | MNZ; 3 | MUG; 1 | MUG; 2 | CAT; 1 | CAT; 2 | CAT; 3 | | 18th | 8 |
| 2024 | Team Motopark | PRT; 1 | PRT; 2 | PRT; 3 | HOC; 1 | HOC; 2 | HOC; 3 | SPA; 1; 7 | SPA; 2; 8 | SPA; 3; 1 | HUN; 1 | HUN; 2 | HUN; 3 | LEC; 1 | LEC; 2 | LEC; 3 | RBR; 1 | RBR; 2 | RBR; 3 | CAT; 1 | CAT; 2 | CAT; 3 | MNZ; 1 | MNZ; 2 | MNZ; 3 | 11th | 36 |

=== Complete Formula Regional Oceania Championship results ===
(key) (Races in bold indicate pole position) (Races in italics indicate fastest lap)

| Year | Team | 1 | 2 | 3 | 4 | 5 | 6 | 7 | 8 | 9 | 10 | 11 | 12 | 13 | 14 | 15 | DC | Points |
|---|---|---|---|---|---|---|---|---|---|---|---|---|---|---|---|---|---|---|
| 2024 | M2 Competition | TAU; 1; 6 | TAU; 2; 1 | TAU; 3; 11 | MAN; 1; 7 | MAN; 2; 10 | MAN; 3; 15 | **HMP**; **1**; 4 | HMP; 2; 5 | HMP; 3 WD | RUA; 1; 6 | RUA; 2; 2 | RUA; 3; 6 | HIG; 1; 8 | HIG; 2; 6 | HIG; 3; 16 | 7th | 205 |

=== Complete FIA Formula 3 Championship results ===
(key) (Races in bold indicate pole position) (Races in italics indicate fastest lap)

| Year | Entrant | 1 | 2 | 3 | 4 | 5 | 6 | 7 | 8 | 9 | 10 | 11 | 12 | 13 | 14 | 15 | 16 | 17 | 18 | 19 | 20 | DC | Points |
|---|---|---|---|---|---|---|---|---|---|---|---|---|---|---|---|---|---|---|---|---|---|---|---|
| 2025 | Hitech TGR | MEL; SPR; 16 | MEL; FEA; 18 | BHR; SPR; 21 | BHR; FEA; 26 | IMO; SPR; 24 | IMO; FEA; 20 | MON; SPR; 18 | MON; FEA; 19 | CAT; SPR; 20 | CAT; FEA; 21 | RBR; SPR; 21 | RBR; FEA; 17 | SIL; SPR; 24 | SIL; FEA; 25 | SPA; SPR; 11 | SPA; FEA; C | HUN; SPR; 10 | HUN; FEA; Ret | MNZ; SPR; 15 | MNZ; FEA; Ret | 29th | 1 |
| 2026 | DAMS Lucas Oil | MEL; SPR; 19 | MEL; FEA; 20 | MON; SPR; 1 | MON; FEA; 9 | CAT; SPR; 3 | CAT; FEA; 15 | RBR; SPR; 16 | RBR; FEA; 25 | SIL; SPR; 29 | SIL; FEA; 22 | SPA; SPR; 21 | SPA; FEA; 21 | HUN; SPR; 28 | HUN; FEA; Ret | MNZ; SPR; Ret | MNZ; FEA; Ret | MAD; SPR | MAD; FEA1 | MAD; FEA2 | | 22nd | 20 |

=== Complete Formula Regional Middle East Trophy results ===
(key) (Races in bold indicate pole position) (Races in italics indicate fastest lap)

| Year | Entrant | 1 | 2 | 3 | 4 | 5 | 6 | 7 | 8 | 9 | 10 | 11 | 12 | DC | Points |
|---|---|---|---|---|---|---|---|---|---|---|---|---|---|---|---|
| 2026 | R-ace GP | YMC1; 1; 21 | YMC1; 2; 10 | YMC1; 3; 12 | YMC2; 1; 13 | YMC2; 2; 19 | YMC2; 3; 19 | DUB; 1 | DUB; 2 | DUB; 3 | LUS; 1 | LUS; 2 | LUS; 3 | 25th | 1 |
