= 2022 F4 Chinese Championship =

Motor racing competition

Seasons
- ← 2021 2023 →

The 2022 F4 Chinese Championship (Shell Helix FIA F4 Chinese Championship) was the eighth season of the F4 Chinese Championship. It began on 12 August at Ningbo International Circuit and ended on 11 December at Pingtan Street Circuit.

== Teams and drivers ==
Teams	No.	Drivers	Status	Rounds
(China) Champ Motorsport	2	(Hong Kong) Patrick Tsang	M	3
(China) Champ Motorsport	8	(Macau) Andy Chang	G	3
(China) Smart Life Racing Team (Note: Written in Chinese.)	3	(China) Gerrard Xie (Note: Xie was entered under a Hong Kong license for round 3 in Macau.)		All
(China) Smart Life Racing Team	9	(China) Lü Jingxi		All
(China) CD Racing	4	(China) Lin Lifeng	G	3
(China) CD Racing	56	(China) Jing Zefeng		3–4
(China) CD Racing	95	(China) Zheng Hui	M	1–2, 4
(China) Pointer Racing	5	(Hong Kong) Henry Lee Junior	M	3
(China) Pointer Racing	88	(China) Jiang Wei	M	1
(China) Pointer Racing	99	(China) Wu Zedong		1, 3–4
(China) Blackjack 21 Racing Team	6	(China) Ye Pengcheng		4
(China) Blackjack 21 Racing Team	29	(China) Fu Zhenjiang	M	1–2
(China) Blackjack 21 Racing Team	30	(China) Pan Yanqing		4
(China) Blackjack 21 Racing Team	55	(China) Lou Duan		2–3
(Hong Kong) Grid Motorsport	10	(China) Steven Bei		3
(Hong Kong) Grid Motorsport	17	(China) Neric Wei	G	3
(China) Theodore Blackjack Racing	11	(Macau) Charles Leong	G	3
(China) Theodore Blackjack Racing	27	(China) Li Sicheng		3
(China) iDEAK Racing	12	(China) Wang Bingxin		1
(China) iDEAK Racing	14	(Chinese Taipei) Brian Lee	M	3
(China) LEO GEEKE Team	16	(China) Xu Shenghui		1–2
(China) LEO GEEKE Team	18	(China) Lü Sixiang	M	4
(China) Edka by Blackjack	21	(China) Pang Changyuan		4
(China) Racing YONG	22	(Macau) Lam Kam San	G	3
(China) Racing YONG	32	(Macau) Cheong Chi Hou		3
(China) Racing YONG	33	(China) Shang Zongyi		4
(China) Racing YONG	93	(China) Yang Shengwei		1–2, 4
(China) Pingtan International Tourist Island Team	31	(Macau) Maximiano Manhão		4
(China) Smart Life Racing Team (Note: Written in Latin.)	72	(Hong Kong) Liu Kaishun		4
(China) Henmax Motorsport	77	(Hong Kong) Jacky Wong	M	1–3
(Hong Kong) Z-Challenger Racing	82	(Hong Kong) Royce Yu		3
(China) Blackjack Racing Team	96	(China) Ni Siming		2

Icon	Class
M	Drivers that compete for the Masters Championship
G	Guest drivers ineligible for Drivers' Championship

== Race calendar and results ==
The calendar featuring 4 rounds and 14 races was announced on 18 March. The revised version was published on 29 July. The Pingtan round was twice postponed, and the event was finally scheduled for the second week of December.

Round		Circuit	Date	Pole position	Fastest lap	Winning driver	Winning team	Master Class Winner	Supporting
1	R1	(China) Ningbo International Circuit, Ningbo	13 August	(China) Gerrard Xie	(China) Gerrard Xie	(China) Gerrard Xie	(China) Smart Life Racing Team	(China) Zheng Hui	China GT Championship
1	R2	(China) Ningbo International Circuit, Ningbo	13 August		(China) Gerrard Xie	(China) Gerrard Xie	(China) Smart Life Racing Team	(China) Jiang Wei	China GT Championship
1	R3	(China) Ningbo International Circuit, Ningbo	14 August	(China) Gerrard Xie	(China) Gerrard Xie	(China) Gerrard Xie	(China) Smart Life Racing Team	(China) Zheng Hui	China GT Championship
1	R4	(China) Ningbo International Circuit, Ningbo	14 August		(China) Xu Shenghui	(China) Xu Shenghui	(China) LEO GEEKE Team	(China) Zheng Hui	China GT Championship
2	R5	(China) Ningbo International Circuit, Ningbo	3 September	(China) Gerrard Xie	(China) Gerrard Xie	(China) Gerrard Xie	(China) Smart Life Racing Team	(China) Zheng Hui	China GT Championship
2	R6	(China) Ningbo International Circuit, Ningbo	3 September		(China) Gerrard Xie	(China) Gerrard Xie	(China) Smart Life Racing Team	(China) Zheng Hui	China GT Championship
2	R7	(China) Ningbo International Circuit, Ningbo	4 September	(China) Gerrard Xie	(China) Gerrard Xie	(China) Gerrard Xie	(China) Smart Life Racing Team	(China) Zheng Hui	China GT Championship
2	R8	(China) Ningbo International Circuit, Ningbo	4 September		(China) Gerrard Xie	(China) Gerrard Xie	(China) Smart Life Racing Team	(China) Zheng Hui	China GT Championship
3	R9	Guia Circuit, Macau	19 November	(Macau) Andy Chang	(Macau) Andy Chang	(China) Gerrard Xie	(China) Smart Life Racing Team	(Chinese Taipei) Brian Lee	Macau Grand Prix
3	R10	Guia Circuit, Macau	20 November	(China) Gerrard Xie	(Macau) Andy Chang	(Macau) Andy Chang	(China) Champ Motorsport	(Chinese Taipei) Brian Lee	Macau Grand Prix
4	R11	(China) Pingtan Ruyi Lake International Circuit, Pingtan Island	10 December	(China) Gerrard Xie	(China) Gerrard Xie	(China) Gerrard Xie	(China) Smart Life Racing Team	(China) Lü Sixiang	China GT Championship
4	R12	(China) Pingtan Ruyi Lake International Circuit, Pingtan Island	10 December		(China) Gerrard Xie	(China) Gerrard Xie	(China) Smart Life Racing Team	(China) Lü Sixiang	China GT Championship
4	R13	(China) Pingtan Ruyi Lake International Circuit, Pingtan Island	11 December	(China) Gerrard Xie	(China) Gerrard Xie	(China) Gerrard Xie	(China) Smart Life Racing Team	(China) Zheng Hui	China GT Championship
4	R14	(China) Pingtan Ruyi Lake International Circuit, Pingtan Island	11 December		(China) Gerrard Xie	(China) Gerrard Xie	(China) Smart Life Racing Team	(China) Lü Sixiang	China GT Championship

== Championship standings ==
Races	Position, points per race									
Races	**1st**	**2nd**	**3rd**	**4th**	**5th**	**6th**	**7th**	**8th**	**9th**	**10th**
4-races Rounds	25	18	15	12	10	8	6	4	2	1
2-races Rounds	50	36	30	24	20	16	12	8	4	2

=== Drivers' Championship ===
Pos	Driver	NIC1				NIC2				MAC		PIC				Pts
1	(China) Gerrard Xie	**1**	1	**1**	Ret	**1**	1	**1**	1	1	**2**	**1**	1	**1**	1	375
2	(China) Lü Jingxi	3	3	3	2	2	2	2	2	7	7	4	Ret	4	4	211
3	(China) Xu Shenghui	2	2	2	1	3	3	3	3							139
4	(China) Jing Zefeng									6	5	2	Ret	3	2	105
5	(China) Zheng Hui	4	7	5	4	6	6	6	6			11	9	7	Ret	80
6	(China) Lou Duan					4	4	4	5	12	10					74
7	(China) Li Sicheng									4	4					72
8	(Hong Kong) Liu Kaishun											3	2	2	3	66
9	(Hong Kong) Royce Yu									5	6					54
10	(China) Yang Shengwei	7	DNS	Ret	6	WD	WD	WD	WD			5	6	6	7	46
11	(China) Ni Siming					5	5	5	4							42
12	(China) Wu Zedong	5	4	4	8					WD	WD					38
13	(Hong Kong) Jacky Wong	9	Ret	Ret	5	7	7	7	7	Ret	WD					36
14	(China) Wang Bingxin	6	5	Ret	3											33
15	(China) Fu Zhenjiang	10	8	6	Ret	8	8	8	8							29
16	(China) Pan Yanqing											9	3	10	5	28
17	(Chinese Taipei) Brian Lee									9	11					28
18	(China) Pang Changyuan											6	4	8	DNS	24
19	(China) Jiang Wei	8	6	7	7											24
20	(Macau) Maximiano Manhão											8	Ret	5	6	22
21	(China) Lü Sixiang											7	7	Ret	9	14
22	(China) Ye Pengcheng											10	8	9	8	11
23	(China) Shang Zongyi											Ret	5	Ret	DNS	10
24	(Hong Kong) Henry Lee Junior									13	Ret					8
–	(Hong Kong) Patrick Tsang									DNS	Ret					–
–	(Macau) Cheong Chi Hou									DNS	WD					–
–	(China) Steven Bei									WD	WD					–
Guest drivers ineligible to score points
	(Macau) Andy Chang									**3**	1					
	(Macau) Charles Leong									2	3					
	(China) Neric Wei									10	8					
	(China) Lin Lifeng									8	Ret					
	(Macau) Lam Kam San									11	9					
Pos	Driver	NIC1				NIC2				MAC		PIC				Pts

Colour	Result
Gold	Winner
Silver	Second place
Bronze	Third place
Green	Points classification
Blue	Non-points classification
Blue	Non-classified finish (NC)
Purple	Retired, not classified (Ret)
Red	Did not qualify (DNQ)
Red	Did not pre-qualify (DNPQ)
Black	Disqualified (DSQ)
White	Did not start (DNS)
White	Withdrew (WD)
White	Race cancelled (C)
Blank	Did not practice (DNP)
Blank	Did not arrive (DNA)
Blank	Excluded (EX)

**Bold** – Pole
Italics – Fastest Lap
† — Did not finish, but classified

=== Teams' Cup ===
Pos	Team	Points
1	(China) Smart Life Racing Team	586
2	(China) CD Racing	185
3	(China) LEO GEEKE Team	153
4	(China) Blackjack 21 Racing Team	142
5	(China) Theodore Blackjack Racing	72
6	(China) Pointer Racing	70
7	(China) Smart Life Racing Team	66
8	(China) iDEAK Racing	61
9	(China) Racing YONG	56
10	(Hong Kong) Z-Challenger Racing	54
11	(China) Blackjack Racing Team	42
12	(China) Henmax Motorsport	36
13	(China) Edka by Blackjack	24
14	(China) Pingtan International Tourist Island Team	22
15	(China) Champ Motorsport	0
16	(Hong Kong) Grid Motorsport	0
