= Gianmarco Pradel =

Australian racing driver (born 2006)

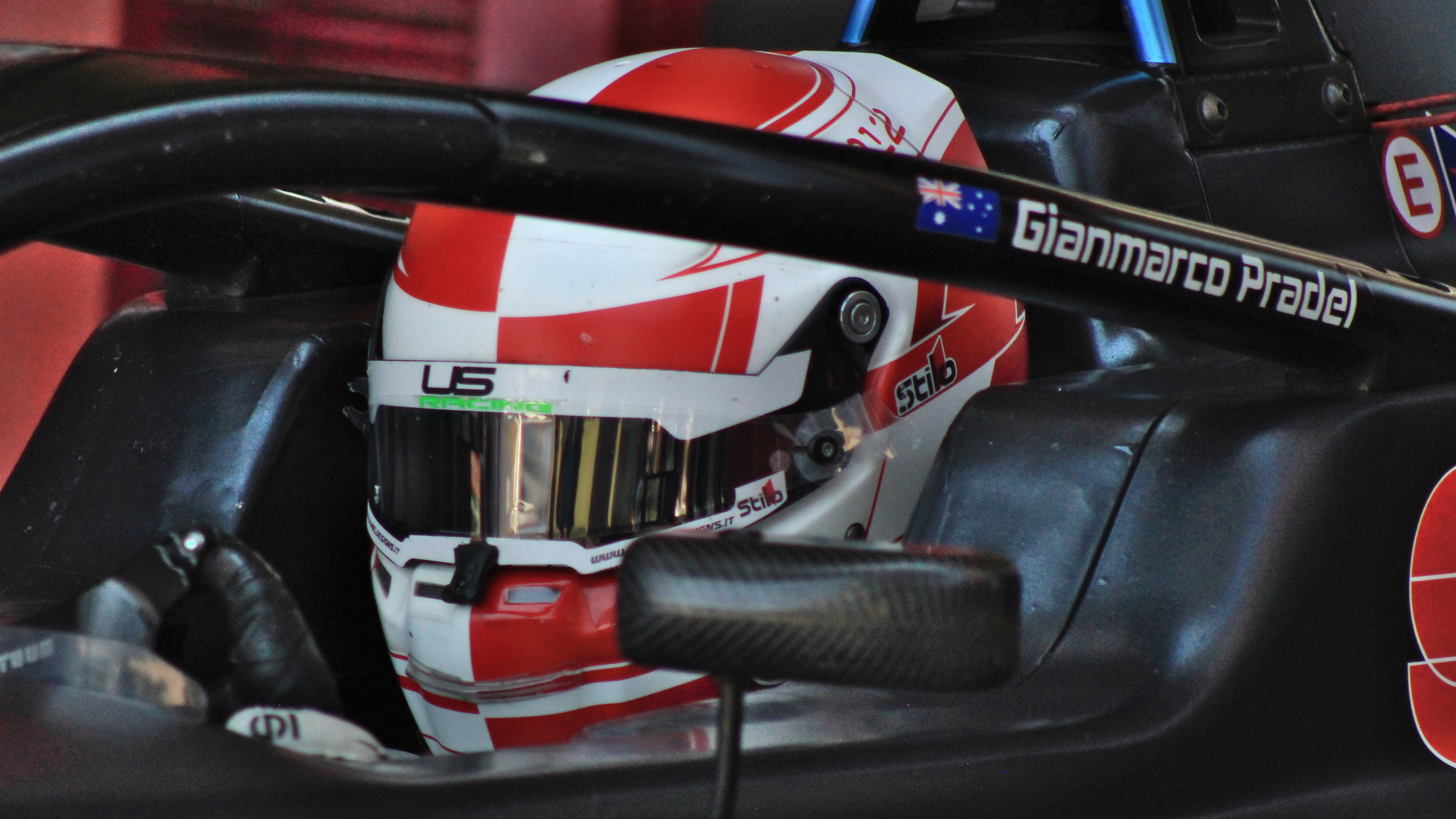
- Pradel in 2024
- Nationality: (Australia) Australian
- Born: 8 March 2006 (age 20) Sydney, Australia

Eurocup-3 career
- Debut season: 2026
- Current team: MP Motorsport
- Categorisation: FIA Silver
- Car number: 12
- Starts: 19
- Wins: 0
- Podiums: 0
- Poles: 1
- Fastest laps: 0
- Best finish: 9th in 2026

Previous series
- 2026 2025 2023–2024 2023–2024 2023–2024 2022 2022: Eurocup-3 Spanish Winter; GB3; Euro 4 Italian F4; Formula Winter Series; F4 Spanish; NSW Formula Car

Gianmarco Pradel (born 8 March 2006) is an Australian racing driver who last competed in Eurocup-3 with MP Motorsport.

Pradel previously competed in the 2025 GB3 Championship with Rodin Motorsport, finishing fourth, and is the runner-up of the 2023 Formula Winter Series. He has also competed in the Italian F4 with US Racing in 2023 and 2024.

== Career ==
=== Karting ===
Pradel began karting in Australia, where he consistently finished in the top ten in the Australian Kart Championship.

=== Formula 4 (2022–2024) ===
==== 2022 ====
In 2022, Pradel joined the New South Wales Formula Race Car Championship driving for AGI Sport. He did not complete the full season, however he finished sixth in the championship after securing two wins and five podiums over nine races. Pradel made his Formula 4 debut as a guest driver in the final round of the 2022 F4 Spanish Championship for Cram-Pinnacle, where he got a best result of 18th over three races.

At the end of the year, Pradel was selected for Ferrari's World Scouting Final for its junior programme.

==== 2023 ====
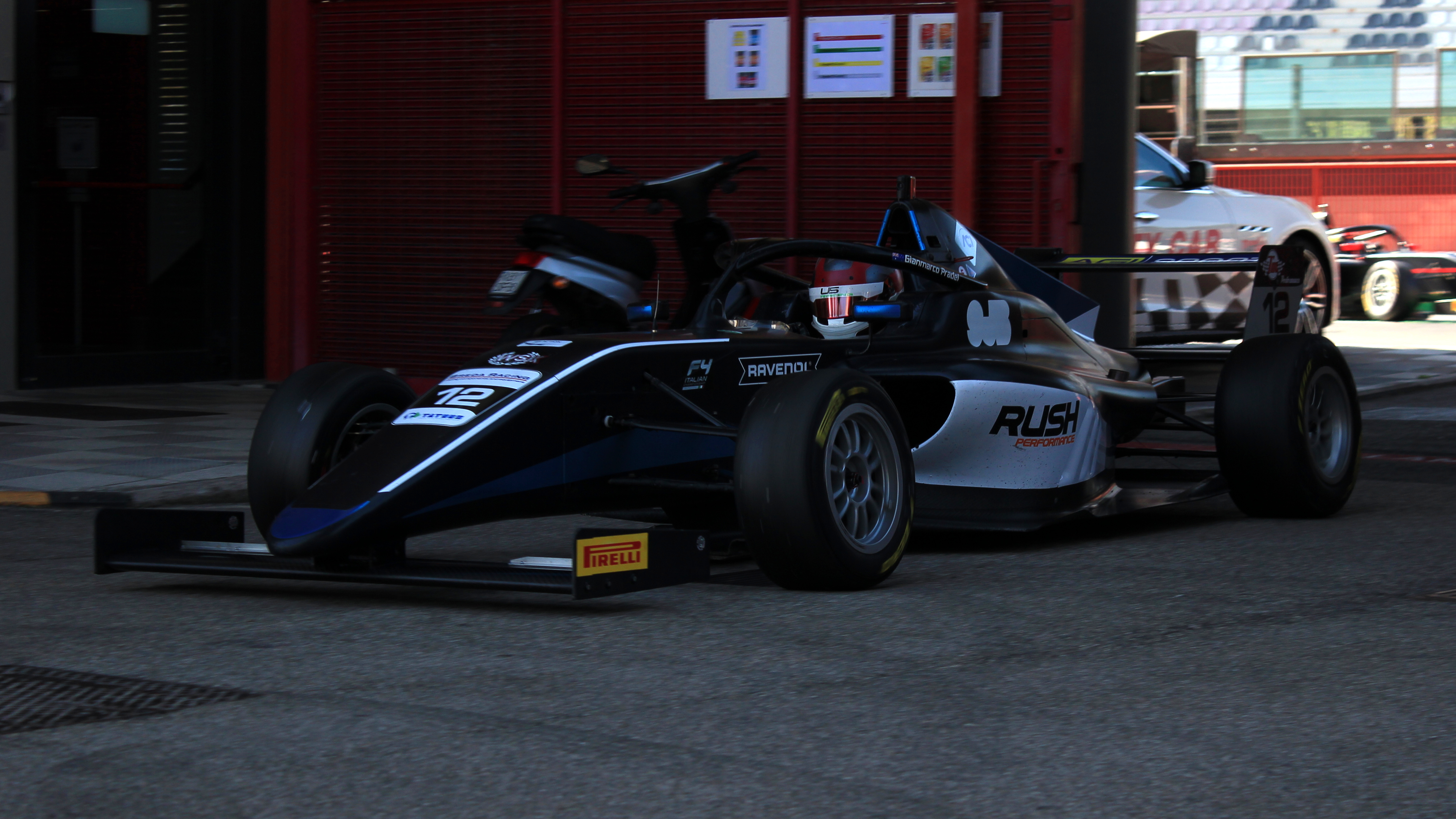
Pradel in the Mugello pit lane during the 2023 Italian F4 Championship

Pradel kicked off his 2023 campaign by driving in the inaugural season of the Formula Winter Series for US Racing. On his way to the rookie title, the Australian amassed six podiums – five of them being third places, while one was a second place – and a pole position at the final round in Circuit de Barcelona-Catalunya. He finished runner-up in the championship with 116 points, behind the dominant Pole Kacper Sztuka.

For his main campaign of the season, Pradel stayed with US Racing to compete in both the Italian F4 Championship and the newly formed Euro 4 Championship.

Pradel's debut round at Imola Circuit was eventful for him, as he retired from his first race after being clipped into the gravel at Tamburello by Tuukka Taponen as they were fighting for ninth position. Pradel came eleventh in the second race and achieved his first points in the final round in a ninth place. Throughout the rest of the season, he scored a string of seventh–tenth place positions and got his maiden podium – a third place – at the first race of the sixth round at Mugello Circuit. After a points-scarce round at Vallelunga Circuit, he finished the drivers' championship in 13th with 42 points.

Meanwhile for his Euro 4 campaign, Pradel scored scattered points in the form of eighth to tenth, finishing 13th in the drivers championship with 16 points.

==== 2024 ====
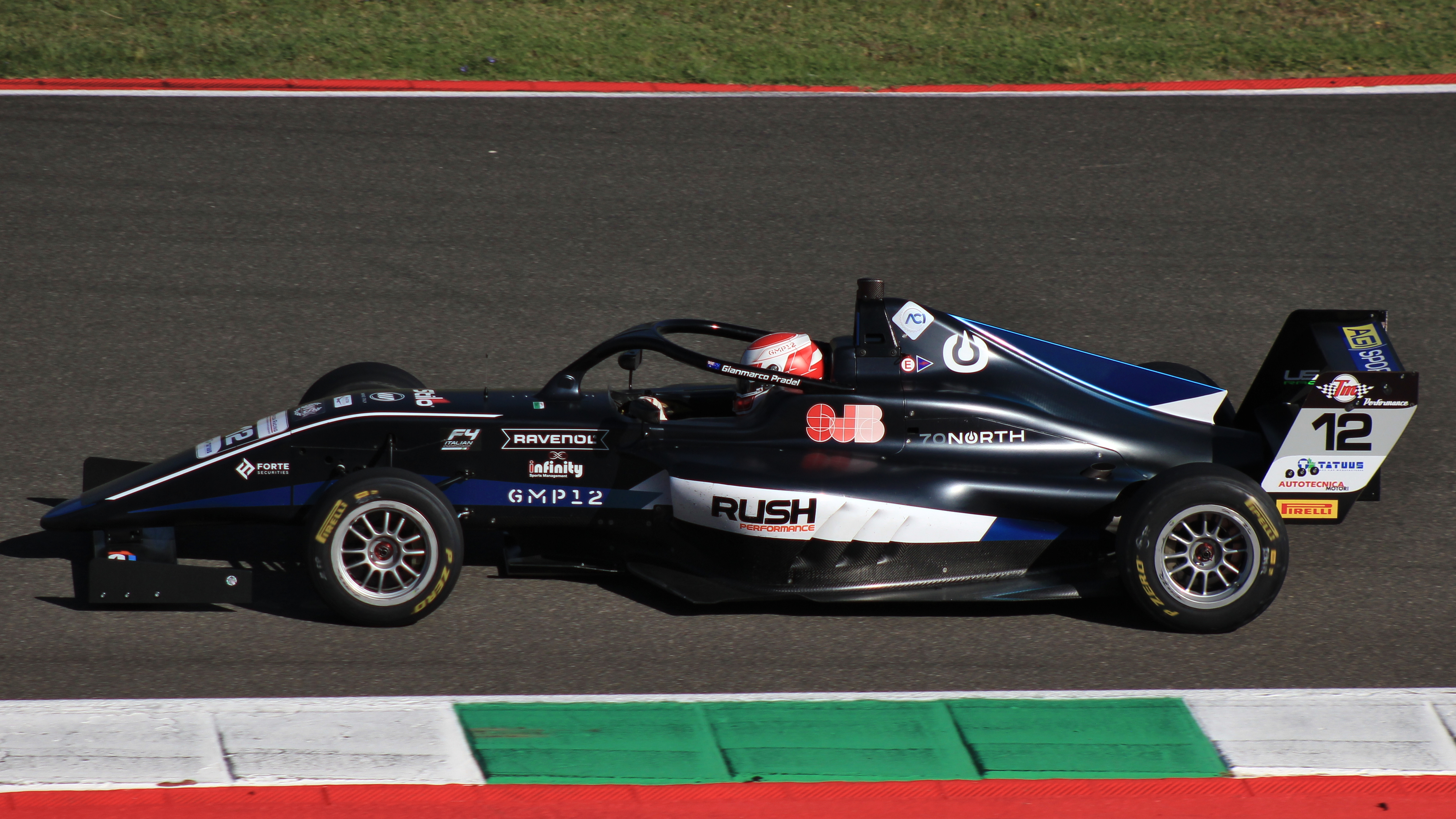
Pradel driving at the Mugello Circuit during the 2024 Italian F4 Championship

Pradel remained with US Racing for the Formula Winter Series, Italian F4 Championship and the Euro 4 Championship.

In the Formula Winter Series, Pradel had a podiumless first half of the season, but would score three podiums – in the form of third places – at the final two rounds of the season at Aragón and Barcelona-Catalunya. He finished fourth in the championship with 79 points.

Pradel kicked off his sophomore year in the Italian F4 Championship with a third place in the first race at Misano Circuit. He was consistent throughout the rest of the season and got his second podium at the third race of the sixth round at Barcelona-Catalunya.

Pradel concluded his campaign by getting his first Formula 4 win at the final round in Monza Circuit, where he denied Freddie Slater his 16th win of the season.

For his Euro 4 Championship campaign, Pradel had a similar season to the previous year, except that he would grab a podium and a maiden fastest lap in the final round at Monza Circuit. He finished the drivers championship in tenth with 49 points.

=== Formula Regional (2025–) ===
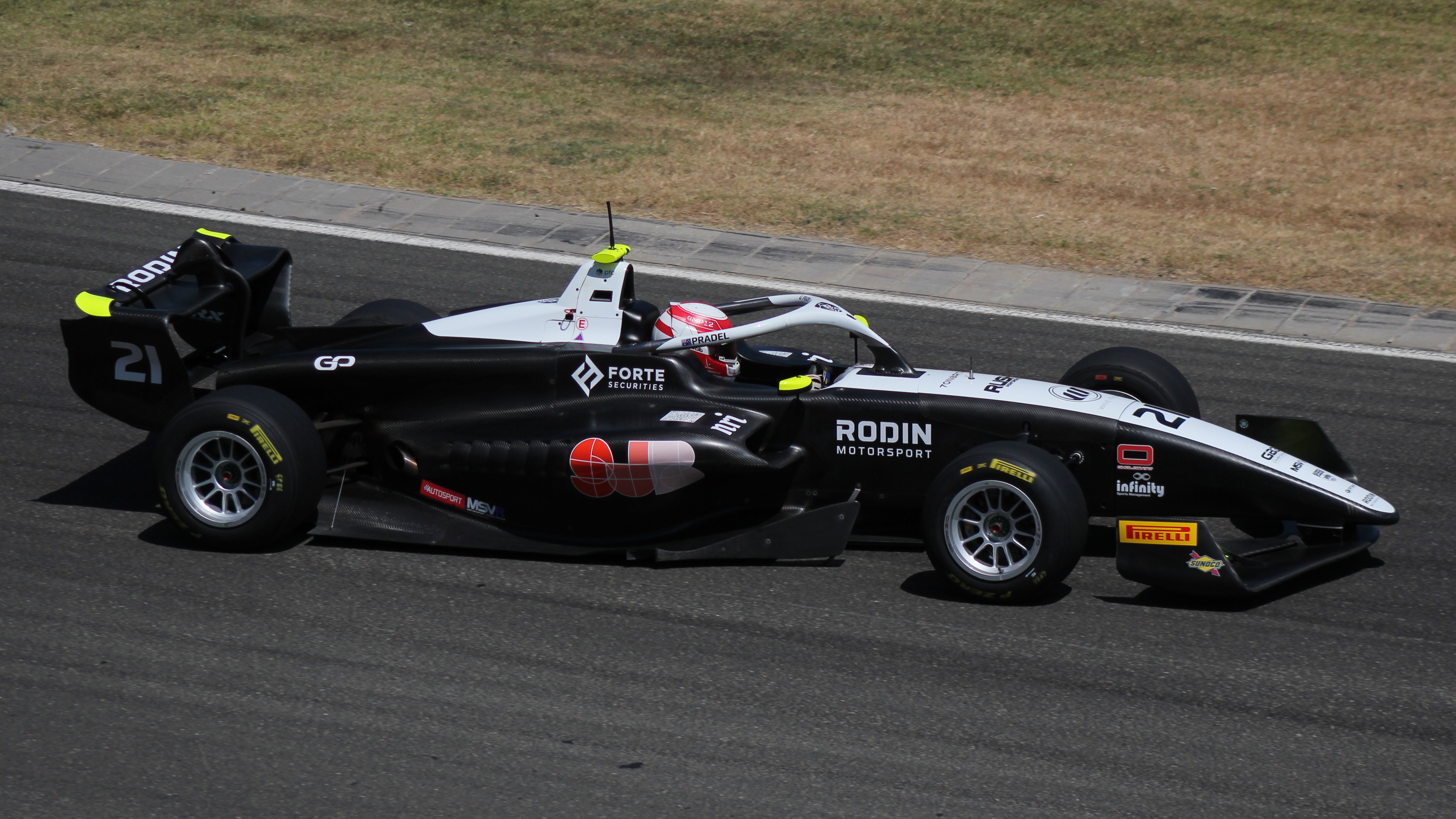
Pradel driving at the Hungaroring during the 2025 GB3 Championship

==== 2025 ====
In 2025, Pradel joined Rodin Motorsport in stepping up to the GB3 Championship. For the season, his teammates were 2024 F1 Academy champion Abbi Pulling and 2024 F4 British runner-up Alex Ninovic. Pradel took two wins and nine podiums to take fourth in the championship being in the fight for second in the championship with Patrick Heuzenroeder and Deagen Fairclough at the final round in Monza but losing out to both Heuzenroeder and Fairclough over the weekend. Pradel's team Rodin Motorsport took the Teams Championship, With Ninovic taking a dominant championship victory and Pulling taking tenth in the championship.

==== 2026 ====
In the pre-season, Pradel competed in the Eurocup-3 winter series with MP Motorsport. He started the first race of the second round at Jarama on pole position, which he converted to a podium. In the final round at Aragón he won the sprint race and came second in the third race enroute to sixth in the standings.

Pradel remained with MP Motorsport for the main season as he moved to Eurocup-3. He started the second race of the opening round at Circuit Paul Ricard on pole position but retired from the race due to a mechanical issue. He claimed his first podium in the sprint race of the third round at Imola Circuit.

== Karting record ==
=== Karting career summary ===
Season	Series	Position
2018	Australian Kart Championship - Cadet 12	77th
2019	Australian Kart Championship - KA4 Junior	18th
2019	Race of Stars - KA3 Junior	16th
2019	New South Wales Kart Championship - KA3 Junior	4th
2019	Brian Farley Memorial - Junior Max	4th
2020	Australian Kart Championship - KA2	9th
2020	Australasian Gold Cup - Junior Performance	3rd
2021	Australian Kart Championship - KA2	9th
2021	Victorian Kart Championship - KA3 Junior	5th
2021	City of Adelaide Titles - KA2	3rd
2022	Australian Kart Championship - X30	8th
2022	Victorian Kart Championship - X30	4th
2022	City of Adelaide Titles - X30	9th

== Racing record ==
=== Racing career summary ===
Season	Series	Team	Races	Wins	Poles	F/Laps	Podiums	Points	Position
2022	New South Wales Formula Race Car Championship	AGI Sport	9	2	0	1	5	153	6th
2022	F4 Spanish Championship	Cram-Pinnacle	3	0	0	0	0	0	NC†
2023	Formula Winter Series	US Racing	8	0	1	0	6	116	**2nd**
2023	Italian F4 Championship	US Racing	21	0	0	0	1	42	13th
2023	Euro 4 Championship	US Racing	9	0	0	0	0	16	13th
2024	Formula Winter Series	US Racing	11	0	0	0	3	79	4th
2024	Italian F4 Championship	US Racing	21	1	0	0	3	110	7th
2024	Euro 4 Championship	US Racing	9	0	0	1	1	49	10th
2025	GB3 Championship	Rodin Motorsport	24	2	0	2	9	364	4th
2026	Eurocup-3 Spanish Winter Championship	MP Motorsport	9	1	1	0	3	61	6th
2026	Eurocup-3	MP Motorsport	19	0	1	0	1	69	9th
2026-27	Asian Le Mans Series - LMP2	Duqueine Team	2	0	0	0	0	0	16th*

^{†} As Pradel was a guest driver, he was ineligible to score championship points.
^{*} Season still in progress.

=== Complete F4 Spanish Championship results ===
(key) (Races in bold indicate pole position) (Races in italics indicate fastest lap)

Year	Team	1	2	3	4	5	6	7	8	9	10	11	12	13	14	15	16	17	18	19	20	21	DC	Points
2022	Cram-Pinnacle	ALG; 1	ALG; 2	ALG; 3	JER; 1	JER; 2	JER; 3	CRT; 1	CRT; 2	CRT; 3	SPA; 1	SPA; 2	SPA; 3	ARA; 1	ARA; 2	ARA; 3	NAV; 1	NAV; 2	NAV; 3	CAT; 1; 19	CAT; 2; 18	CAT; 3; 28	NC†	0

^{†} As Pradel was a guest driver, he was ineligible to score points.

=== Complete Formula Winter Series results ===
(key) (Races in bold indicate pole position; races in italics indicate fastest lap)

Year	Team	1	2	3	4	5	6	7	8	9	10	11	12	DC	Points
2023	US Racing	JER; 1; 3	JER; 2; 5	CRT; 1; 4	CRT; 2; 3	NAV; 1; 3	NAV; 2; 3	**CAT**; **2**; 2	CAT; 2; 3					2nd	116
2024	US Racing	JER; 1; 6	JER; 2 Ret	JER; 3; 13	CRT; 1; 7	CRT; 2; 4	CRT; 3; 6	ARA; 1; 3	ARA; 2; 24	ARA; 3; 3	CAT; 1 C	CAT; 2 Ret	CAT; 3; 3	4th	79

=== Complete Italian F4 Championship results ===
(key) (Races in bold indicate pole position) (Races in italics indicate fastest lap)

Year	Team	1	2	3	4	5	6	7	8	9	10	11	12	13	14	15	16	17	18	19	20	21	22	DC	Points
2023	US Racing	IMO; 1	IMO; 2 Ret	IMO; 3; 11	IMO; 4; 9	MIS; 1; 9	MIS; 2; 10	MIS; 3; 12	SPA; 1; 29	SPA; 2; 9	SPA; 3; 20	MNZ; 1; 9	MNZ; 2; 8	MNZ; 3; 7	LEC; 1; 9	LEC; 2; 10	LEC; 3; 18	MUG; 1; 3	MUG; 2; 7	MUG; 3; 15	VLL; 1; 11	VLL; 2; 16	VLL; 3; 22	13th	42
2024	US Racing	MIS; 1; 3	MIS; 2; 12	MIS; 3; 6	IMO; 1; 9	IMO; 2 Ret	IMO; 3; 20	VLL; 1; 9	VLL; 2; 8	VLL; 3; 7	MUG; 1; 14	MUG; 2; 8	MUG; 3; 17	LEC; 1; 12	LEC; 2; 7	LEC; 3; 28	CAT; 1; 9	CAT; 2; 5	CAT; 3; 2	MNZ; 1; 6	MNZ; 2 Ret	MNZ; 3; 1		7th	110

=== Complete Euro 4 Championship results ===
(key) (Races in bold indicate pole position; races in italics indicate fastest lap)

Year	Team	1	2	3	4	5	6	7	8	9	DC	Points
2023	US Racing	MUG; 1; 12	MUG; 2; 9	MUG; 3; 12	MNZ; 1; 8	MNZ; 2; 11	MNZ; 3; 8	CAT; 1; 9	CAT; 2 Ret	CAT; 3; 10	13th	16
2024	US Racing	MUG; 1 Ret	MUG; 2; 5	MUG; 3; 6	RBR; 1; 11	RBR; 2; 8	RBR; 3 Ret	MNZ; 1 Ret	MNZ; 2; 3	MNZ; 3; 4	10th	49

=== Complete GB3 Championship results ===
(key) (Races in bold indicate pole position) (Races in italics indicate fastest lap)

Year	Team	1	2	3	4	5	6	7	8	9	10	11	12	13	14	15	16	17	18	19	20	21	22	23	24	DC	Points
2025	Rodin Motorsport	SIL1; 1; 3	SIL1; 2; 4	SIL1; 3 Ret	ZAN; 1; 3	ZAN; 2; 7	ZAN; 3 Ret	SPA; 1; 6	SPA; 2; 7	SPA; 3; 16	HUN; 1; 1	HUN; 2; 3	HUN; 3; 10	SIL2; 1; 2	SIL2; 2; 9	SIL2; 3; 1	BRH; 1; 7	BRH; 2; 5	BRH; 3; 17	DON; 1; 8	DON; 2; 10	DON; 3 Ret	MNZ; 1; 3	MNZ; 2; 3	MNZ; 3; 3^{1}	4th	364

=== Complete Eurocup-3 Spanish Winter Championship results ===
(key) (Races in bold indicate pole position) (Races in italics indicate fastest lap)

Year	Team	1	2	3	4	5	6	7	8	9	DC	Points
2026	MP Motorsport	POR; 1 Ret	POR; SPR; 15	POR; 2; 7	**JAR**; **1**; 2	JAR; SPR; 8	JAR; 2; 21	ARA; 1; 8	ARA; SPR; 1	ARA; 2; 2	6th	61

=== Complete Eurocup-3 results ===
(key) (Races in bold indicate pole position; races in italics indicate fastest lap)

Year	Team	1	2	3	4	5	6	7	8	9	10	11	12	13	14	15	16	17	18	19	DC	Points
2026	MP Motorsport	LEC; 1; 5	LEC; SR; 5	**LEC**; **2** Ret	POR; 1; 11	POR; 2; 7	IMO; 1; 16	IMO; SR; 3	IMO; 2; 10	MNZ; 1; 12	MNZ; 2; 11	SIL; 1; 4	SIL; 2; 8	JER; 1; 8	JER; SR; 14	JER; 2; 12	HUN; 1; 15	HUN; 2; 4	CAT; 1; 8	CAT; 2; 13	9th	69

=== Complete Asian Le Mans Series results ===
(key) (Races in bold indicate pole position; results in italics indicate fastest lap)

Year	Entrant	Class	Chassis	Engine	1	2	3	4	5	6	Rank	Points
2026–27	Duqueine Team	LMP2	Oreca 07	Gibson GK428 4.2 L V8	LEC; 1; 14	LEC; 2; 15	JER; 1	JER; 2	POR; 1	POR; 2	16th*	0*

* Season still in progess.
