= Lin Hodenius =

Dutch racing driver (born 2006)

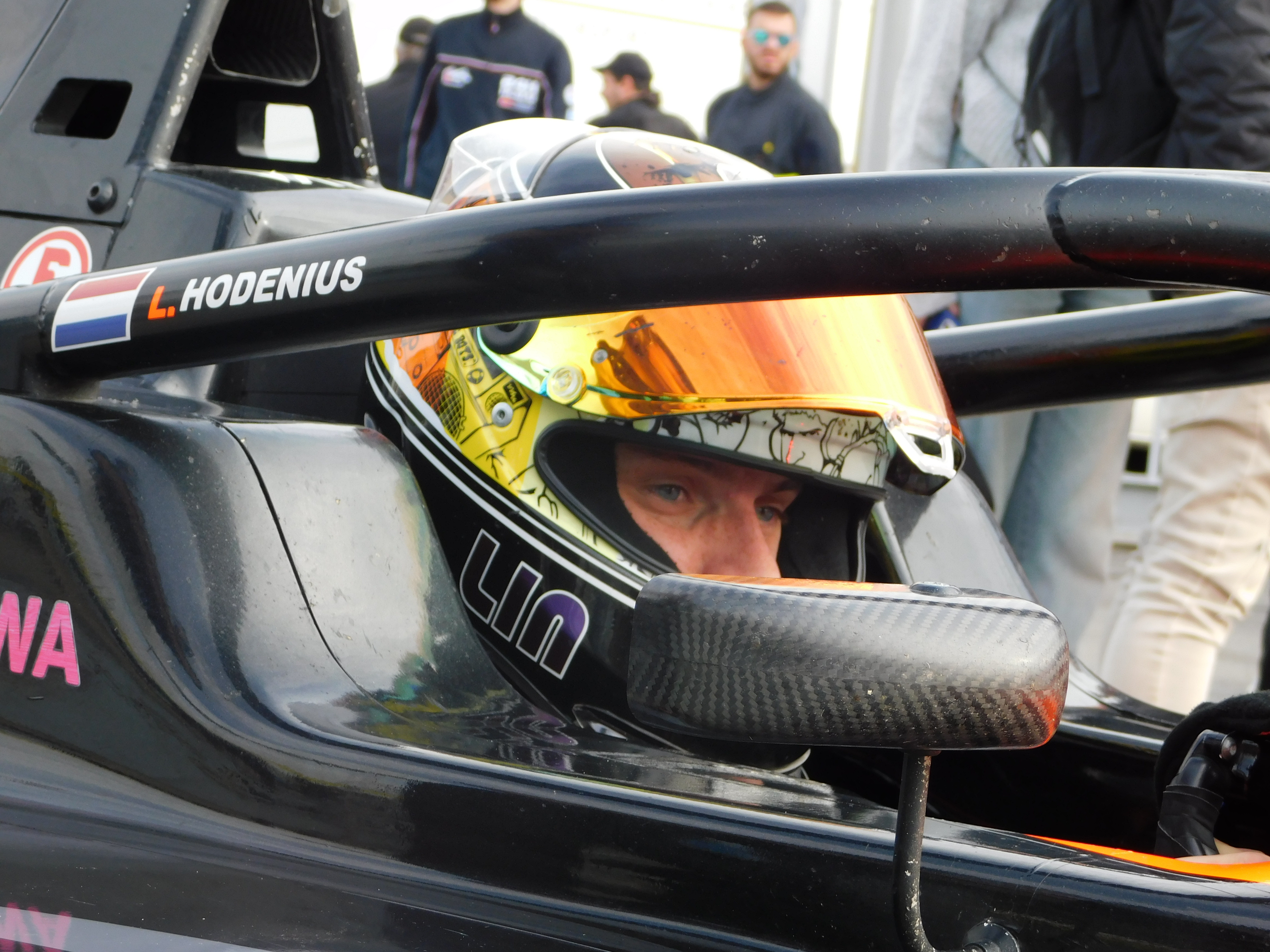
- Hodenius in 2024
- Nationality: (Netherlands) Dutch
- Born: Lin Boy Dieter Hodenius; 1 August 2006 (age 20) Amsterdam, Netherlands

FIA World Endurance Championship career
- Debut season: 2025
- Current team: Iron Lynx
- Categorisation: FIA Silver
- Car number: 79
- Starts: 16
- Wins: 0
- Podiums: 1
- Poles: 0
- Fastest laps: 0
- Best finish: 13th in 2025

Championship titles
- 2023: Porsche Sprint Challenge Southern Europe – Sport Pro-Am

Lin Boy Dieter Hodenius (born 1 August 2006) is a Dutch racing driver who last competed in the LMGT3 class of the FIA World Endurance Championship for Iron Lynx as a Mercedes-AMG junior.

== Career ==
Hodenius began his racing career in 2022, competing in Porsche Sprint Challenge Benelux for Team GP Elite. Racing in the GT4 class, Hodenius scored a best result of second in both Assen races as he ended the year sixth in points. Remaining in Porsche one-make competition for the start of the following year, Hodenius raced in Porsche Sprint Challenge Southern Europe for the same team, taking two wins en route to the Sport Pro-Am title. For the rest of the year, Hodenius switched to single-seaters as he joined Monlau Motorsport to compete in the F4 Spanish Championship from the second round onwards. In his only season in the series, Hodenius scored a best result of 11th twice as he ended the year 27th in the overall standings. Towards the end of the year, Hodenius also raced for Van Amersfoort Racing in the Barcelona round of the Euro 4 Championship.

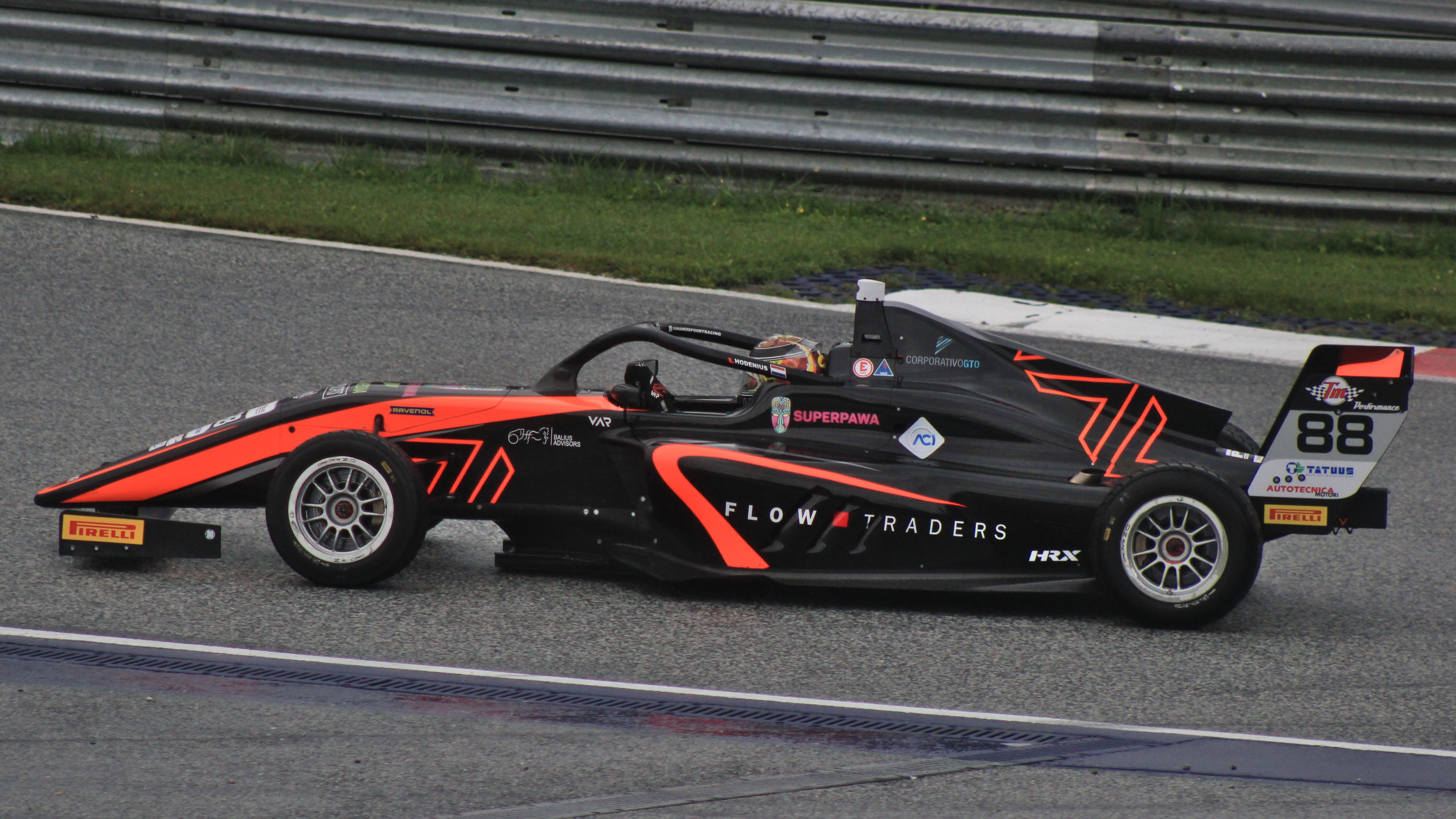
Hodenius driving for Van Amersfoort Racing at the Red Bull Ring in Euro 4 in 2024.

Following a one-off appearance for Monlau Motorsport in the Formula Winter Series at Aragón, in which he finished seventh in race two at the start of 2024, Hodenius returned to Van Amersfoort Racing to race in both the Italian F4 and Euro 4 Championships. In the former, Hodenius took his only points in a wet-dry race three at Le Castellet by finishing eighth, whereas in the latter, Hodenius went scoreless as he took a best result of 13th twice.

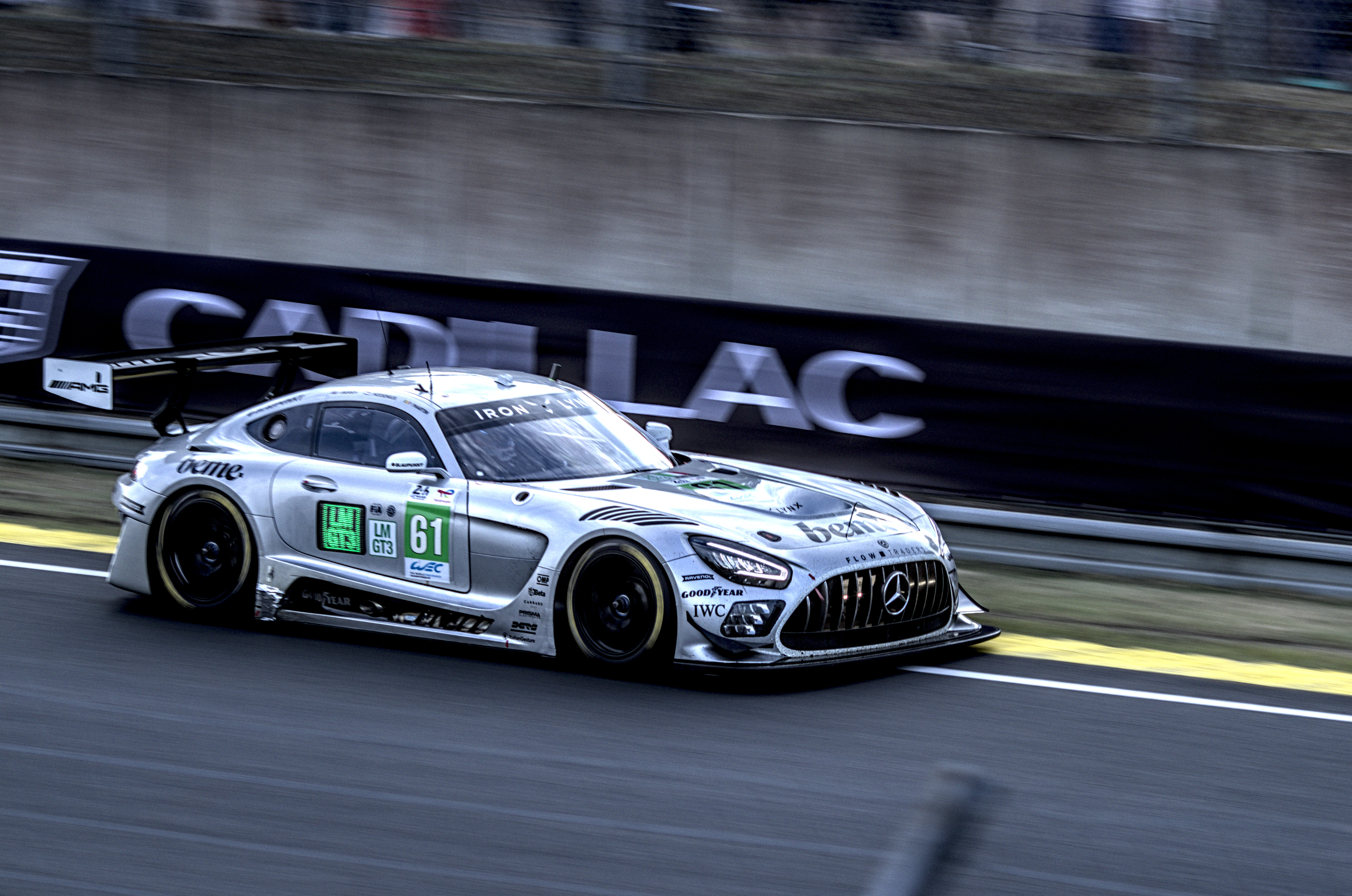
Hodenius' Iron Lynx Mercedes at the 2025 24 Hours of Le Mans.

At the beginning of 2025, Hodenius joined Mercedes-fielding Team Motopark to make his debut in GT3 competition at the Dubai 24 Hour. For the rest of the year, Hodenius joined Mercedes-affiliated Iron Lynx to compete in the LMGT3 class of the FIA World Endurance Championship. In his rookie year in the series, Hodenius scored a pair of eighth-place finishes at the 24 Hours of Le Mans and the 6 Hours of Fuji, as well as a podium at the Bahrain finale en route to a 13th-place points finish. Hodenius also raced for Iron Lynx in one-off appearances in the Italian GT Endurance and Sprint championships, most notably taking a win in the former at Imola. During 2025, Hodenius also raced for GetSpeed at the 24 Hours of Spa, as well as competing for Lone Star Racing at the Indianapolis 8 Hour and select rounds of the IMSA SportsCar Championship.

The following year, Hodenius remained with Iron Lynx for a second campaign in the FIA World Endurance Championship, as well as returning to Lone Star Racing to compete in the endurance rounds of the IMSA SportsCar Championship, as a new addition to Mercedes-AMG's junior driver roster. In the former, Hodenius scored a best result of sixth at Monza, whereas in the latter he took a best result of fourth at both the 12 Hours of Sebring and Petit Le Mans alongside James Roe.

== Racing record ==
=== Racing career summary ===
Season	Series	Team	Races	Wins	Poles	F/Laps	Podiums	Points	Position
2022	Porsche Sprint Challenge Benelux – GT4	Team GP Elite	6	0	0	0	3	83	6th
2023	Porsche Sprint Challenge Southern Europe – Sport Pro-Am	Team GP Elite	6	2	2	6	5	126	**1st**
2023	F4 Spanish Championship	Monlau Motorsport	17	0	0	0	0	0	27th
2023	Euro 4 Championship	Van Amersfoort Racing	3	0	0	0	0	0	24th
2024	Formula Winter Series	Monlau Motorsport	3	0	0	0	0	6	24th
2024	Italian F4 Championship	Van Amersfoort Racing	21	0	0	0	0	4	25th
2024	Euro 4 Championship	Van Amersfoort Racing	9	0	0	0	0	0	28th
2025	Middle East Trophy – GT3 Pro-Am	Team Motopark	1	0	0	0	0	0	NC
2025	FIA World Endurance Championship – LMGT3	Iron Lynx	8	0	0	0	1	39	13th
2025	24 Hours of Le Mans – LMGT3	Iron Lynx	1	0	0	0	0	—N/a	12th
2025	Italian GT Championship Endurance Cup – GT3	Iron Lynx	1	1	0	0	1	32	NC
2025	Italian GT Championship Sprint Cup – GT3	Iron Lynx	2	0	0	0	0	2	NC
2025	GT World Challenge Europe Endurance Cup	GetSpeed	2	0	0	0	0	0	NC
2025	GT World Challenge Europe Endurance Cup – Silver	GetSpeed	2	0	0	0	0	2	38th
2025	Intercontinental GT Challenge	GetSpeed	1	0	0	0	0	0	NC
2025	Intercontinental GT Challenge	Mercedes-AMG Lone Star Racing	1	0	0	0	0	0	NC
2025	IMSA SportsCar Championship – GTD	Lone Star Racing	2	0	0	0	0	363	56th
2026	IMSA SportsCar Championship – GTD	Lone Star Racing	5	0	0	0	0	1372	21st
2026	Nürburgring Langstrecken-Serie – VT2-RWD								
2026	FIA World Endurance Championship – LMGT3	Iron Lynx	8	0	0	0	0	18	20th
2026	International GT Open	Team Motopark	0	0	0	0	0	0	NC
2026	GT World Challenge America – Pro	Mercedes-AMG Team Lone Star Racing	1	0	0	0	0	0	NC†
2026	Intercontinental GT Challenge	Mercedes-AMG Team Lone Star Racing	1	0	0	0	0	0	NC
2027	IMSA SportsCar Championship – GTD	Lone Star Racing						*	*

^{†} As Hodenius was a guest driver, he was ineligible to score points.

=== Complete F4 Spanish Championship results ===
(key) (Races in bold indicate pole position) (Races in italics indicate fastest lap)

Year	Team	1	2	3	4	5	6	7	8	9	10	11	12	13	14	15	16	17	18	19	20	21	DC	Points
2023	Monlau Motorsport	SPA; 1	SPA; 2	SPA; 3	ARA; 1; 26	ARA; 2; 24	ARA; 3; 26†	NAV; 1; 20	NAV; 2; 26	NAV; 3; 25	JER; 1; 29†	JER; 2; 19	JER; 3; 11	EST; 1; 11	EST; 2; 15	EST; 3; 24	CRT; 1; 17	CRT; 2; 21	CRT; 3; 30	CAT; 1; 12	CAT; 2 Ret	CAT; 3 DNS	27th	0

=== Complete Euro 4 Championship results ===
(key) (Races in bold indicate pole position; races in italics indicate fastest lap)

Year	Team	1	2	3	4	5	6	7	8	9	DC	Points
2023	Van Amersfoort Racing	MUG; 1	MUG; 2	MUG; 3	MNZ; 1	MNZ; 2	MNZ; 3	CAT; 1; 12	CAT; 2; 12	CAT; 3; 16	24th	0
2024	Van Amersfoort Racing	MUG; 1 Ret	MUG; 2; 13	MUG; 3 Ret	RBR; 1; 18	RBR; 2; 15	RBR; 3; 21	MNZ; 1; 13	MNZ; 2; 23	MNZ; 3; 17	28th	0

=== Complete Formula Winter Series results ===
(key) (Races in bold indicate pole position; races in italics indicate fastest lap)

Year	Team	1	2	3	4	5	6	7	8	9	10	11	12	DC	Points
2024	Monlau Motorsport	JER; 1	JER; 2	JER; 3	CRT; 1	CRT; 2	CRT; 3	ARA; 1; 26	ARA; 2; 7	ARA; 3; 16	CAT; 1	CAT; 2	CAT; 3	24th	6

=== Complete Italian F4 Championship results ===
(key) (Races in bold indicate pole position) (Races in italics indicate fastest lap)

Year	Team	1	2	3	4	5	6	7	8	9	10	11	12	13	14	15	16	17	18	19	20	21	DC	Points
2024	Van Amersfoort Racing	MIS; 1; 22	MIS; 2; 22	MIS; 3 Ret	IMO; 1; 20	IMO; 2; 13	IMO; 3; 30	VLL; 1; 21	VLL; 2; 20	VLL; 3 Ret	MUG; 1; 22	MUG; 2; 28†	MUG; 3; 23	LEC; 1 Ret	LEC; 2 Ret	LEC; 3; 8	CAT; 1; 15	CAT; 2; 15	CAT; 3; 15	MNZ; 1; 24	MNZ; 2; 28	MNZ; 3; 31†	25th	4

=== Complete FIA World Endurance Championship results ===
(key) (Races in bold indicate pole position; races in italics indicate fastest lap)

Year	Entrant	Class	Chassis	Engine	1	2	3	4	5	6	7	8	Rank	Points
2025	Iron Lynx	LMGT3	Mercedes-AMG GT3 Evo	Mercedes-AMG M159 6.2 L V8	QAT; Ret	IMO; 13	SPA; 11	LMS; 8	SÃO; Ret	COA; Ret	FUJ; 8	BHR; 2	13th	39
2026	Iron Lynx	LMGT3	Mercedes-AMG GT3 Evo	Mercedes-AMG M159 6.2 L V8	IMO; 12	SPA; Ret	LMS; Ret	SÃO; 15	COA; 7	FUJ; 13	CAT; 8	MNZ; 6	20th	18

=== Complete 24 Hours of Le Mans results ===
Year	Team	Co-Drivers	Car	Class	Laps	Pos.	Class Pos.
2025	(Italy) Iron Lynx	(Australia) Martin Berry (Belgium) Maxime Martin	Mercedes-AMG GT3 Evo	LMGT3	337	44th	12th
2026	(Italy) Iron Lynx	(Italy) Matteo Cressoni (Italy) Johannes Zelger	Mercedes-AMG GT3 Evo	LMGT3	153	DNF	DNF

=== Complete GT World Challenge Europe results ===
==== GT World Challenge Europe Endurance Cup ====
(Races in bold indicate pole position) (Races in italics indicate fastest lap)

Year	Team	Car	Class	1	2	3	4	5	6	7	Pos.	Points
2025	GetSpeed	Mercedes-AMG GT3 Evo	Silver	LEC	MNZ	SPA; 6H; 68†	SPA; 12H; 68†	SPA; 24H; Ret	NÜR; 30	BAR	38th	2

=== Complete IMSA SportsCar Championship results ===
(key) (Races in bold indicate pole position; results in italics indicate fastest lap)

Year	Team	Class	Make	Engine	1	2	3	4	5	6	7	8	9	10	Pos.	Points
2025	Lone Star Racing	GTD	Mercedes-AMG GT3 Evo	Mercedes-AMG M159 6.2 L V8	DAY	SEB	LBH	LGA	WGL	MOS	ELK	VIR	IMS; 16	PET; 15	56th	363
2026	Lone Star Racing	GTD	Mercedes-AMG GT3 Evo	Mercedes-AMG M159 6.2 L V8	DAY; 6	SEB; 4	LBH	LGA	WGL; 10	MOS	ELK; 6	VIR	IMS	PET; 4	21st	1372
