= 2023 Formula Winter Series =

Multi-event motor racing championship

The 2023 Formula Winter Series was the first season of the Formula Winter Series. It is a multi-event motor racing championship for open wheel, formula racing cars regulated according to FIA Formula 4 regulations, based in Spain. The series is organised by Gedlich Racing with the approval of the RFEDA.

== Entry list ==
Team	No.	Driver	Class	Rounds
(Slovenia) AS Motorsport	5	(Italy) Alvise Rodella	R	1–2
(Slovenia) AS Motorsport	62	(United States) Luca Roth	R	1
(Spain) Campos Racing	6	(Uruguay) Maite Cáceres	F	2, 4
(Spain) Campos Racing	7	(Italy) Matteo De Palo	R	2
(Spain) Campos Racing	10	(France) Lola Lovinfosse	F	4
(Spain) Campos Racing	32	(Spain) Nerea Martí	F	2
(San Marino) AKM Motorsport	11	(Thailand) Carl Bennett		1–2
(San Marino) AKM Motorsport	19	(Switzerland) Tina Hausmann	F R	1–2
(Germany) US Racing	12	(Australia) Gianmarco Pradel	R	All
(Germany) US Racing	14	(Denmark) Frederik Lund		All
(Germany) US Racing	20	(Malta) Zachary David		4
(Germany) US Racing	31	(Singapore) Akshay Bohra		4
(Germany) US Racing	37	(Poland) Kacper Sztuka		1–3
(Germany) US Racing	66	(China) Ruiqi Liu	R	All
(United Kingdom) Phinsys by Argenti	17	(Australia) Patrick Heuzenroeder	R	2
(United Kingdom) Phinsys by Argenti	26	(Israel) Isaac Barashi	R	2
(United Kingdom) Phinsys by Argenti	77	(India) Jaden Pariat	R	2
(Switzerland) Jenzer Motorsport	26	(South Korea) Kim Hwarang		3–4
(Switzerland) Jenzer Motorsport	27	(Switzerland) Ethan Ischer		3–4
(Spain) Drivex	44	(Spain) Juan Cota	R	1–2
(Spain) Drivex	69	(Colombia) Maximiliano Restrepo	R	1–2
(Spain) GRS Team	88	(United Arab Emirates) Amna Al Qubaisi	F	4

- BWR Motorsports, Rodin Carlin and Monlau Motorsport were scheduled to enter the championship, but did not appear in any rounds.

== Race calendar ==
The calendar was announced on 20 September 2022. The four rounds are organized by Gedlich Racing. All rounds consist of two qualifying sessions and two races.

Round		Circuit	Date	Supporting
1	R1	(Spain) Circuito de Jerez, Jerez de la Frontera	10–12 February	GT Winter Series
1	R2	(Spain) Circuito de Jerez, Jerez de la Frontera	10–12 February	GT Winter Series
2	R1	(Spain) Circuit Ricardo Tormo, Cheste	17–19 February	GT Winter Series
2	R2	(Spain) Circuit Ricardo Tormo, Cheste	17–19 February	GT Winter Series
3	R1	(Spain) Circuito de Navarra, Los Arcos	3–5 March	GT Winter Series
3	R2	(Spain) Circuito de Navarra, Los Arcos	3–5 March	GT Winter Series
4	R1	(Spain) Circuit de Barcelona-Catalunya, Montmeló	10–12 March	GT Winter Series
4	R2	(Spain) Circuit de Barcelona-Catalunya, Montmeló	10–12 March	GT Winter Series

== Results ==
Round		Circuit	Pole position	Fastest lap	Winning driver	Winning team	Rookie winner
1	R1	(Spain) Circuito de Jerez, Jerez de la Frontera	(Poland) Kacper Sztuka	(China) Ruiqi Liu	(Poland) Kacper Sztuka	(Germany) US Racing	(Australia) Gianmarco Pradel
1	R2	(Spain) Circuito de Jerez, Jerez de la Frontera	(Poland) Kacper Sztuka	(Denmark) Frederik Lund	(Poland) Kacper Sztuka	(Germany) US Racing	(China) Ruiqi Liu
2	R3	(Spain) Circuit Ricardo Tormo, Cheste	(Italy) Matteo De Palo	(Poland) Kacper Sztuka	(Italy) Matteo De Palo	(Spain) Campos Racing	(Italy) Matteo De Palo
2	R4	(Spain) Circuit Ricardo Tormo, Cheste	(Italy) Matteo De Palo	(Poland) Kacper Sztuka	(Poland) Kacper Sztuka	(Germany) US Racing	(Australia) Gianmarco Pradel
3	R5	(Spain) Circuito de Navarra, Los Arcos	(Poland) Kacper Sztuka	(Poland) Kacper Sztuka	(Poland) Kacper Sztuka	(Germany) US Racing	(Australia) Gianmarco Pradel
3	R6	(Spain) Circuito de Navarra, Los Arcos	(Poland) Kacper Sztuka	(Poland) Kacper Sztuka	(Poland) Kacper Sztuka	(Germany) US Racing	(China) Ruiqi Liu
4	R7	(Spain) Circuit de Barcelona-Catalunya, Montmeló	(Australia) Gianmarco Pradel	(Malta) Zachary David	(Malta) Zachary David	(Germany) US Racing	(Australia) Gianmarco Pradel
4	R8	(Spain) Circuit de Barcelona-Catalunya, Montmeló	(Malta) Zachary David	(Malta) Zachary David	(Malta) Zachary David	(Germany) US Racing	(Australia) Gianmarco Pradel

== Championship standings ==
=== Scoring system ===
Points are awarded to the top ten classified drivers, the pole-sitter and the fastest lap holder as follows:

Position	**1st**	**2nd**	**3rd**	**4th**	**5th**	**6th**	**7th**	**8th**	**9th**	**10th**	Pole	FL
Points	25	18	15	12	10	8	6	4	2	1	1	1

=== Drivers' championship ===
Pos	Driver	JER (Spain)		CRT (Spain)		NAV (Spain)		CAT (Spain)		Pts
Pos	Driver	R1	R2	R1	R2	R1	R2	R1	R2	Pts
1	(Poland) Kacper Sztuka	**1**	**1**	2	1	**1**	**1**			151
2	(Australia) Gianmarco Pradel	3	5	4	3	3	3	**2**	3	116
3	(Denmark) Frederik Lund	2	4	3	2	2	Ret	4	4	106
4	(China) Ruiqi Liu	6	2	5	6	6	2	3	5	96
5	(Malta) Zachary David							1	**1**	53
6	(Italy) Matteo De Palo			**1**	**5**					37
7	(South Korea) Kim Hwarang					4	4	7	7	36
8	(Spain) Juan Cota	5	6	7	4					36
9	(Singapore) Akshay Bohra							5	2	28
10	(Switzerland) Tina Hausmann	4	3	15†	Ret					27
11	(Switzerland) Ethan Ischer					5	Ret	6	6	26
12	(Italy) Alvise Rodella	9	7	8	8					16
13	(Thailand) Carl Bennett	7	8	9	Ret					12
14	(Spain) Nerea Martí			6	10					9
15	(Uruguay) Maite Cáceres			10	9			8	9†	9
16	(India) Jaden Pariat			14	7					6
17	(Colombia) Maximiliano Restrepo	8	9	11	13†					6
18	(France) Lola Lovinfosse							Ret	8	4
19	(Australia) Patrick Heuzenroeder			13	11					0
20	(Israel) Isaac Barashi			12	12†					0
–	(United Arab Emirates) Amna Al Qubaisi							Ret	DSQ	–
–	(United States) Luca Roth	WD	WD							–
Pos	Driver	JER (Spain)		CRT (Spain)		NAV (Spain)		CAT (Spain)		Pts

Colour	Result
Gold	Winner
Silver	Second place
Bronze	Third place
Green	Points classification
Blue	Non-points classification
Blue	Non-classified finish (NC)
Purple	Retired, not classified (Ret)
Red	Did not qualify (DNQ)
Red	Did not pre-qualify (DNPQ)
Black	Disqualified (DSQ)
White	Did not start (DNS)
White	Withdrew (WD)
White	Race cancelled (C)
Blank	Did not practice (DNP)
Blank	Did not arrive (DNA)
Blank	Excluded (EX)

**Bold** – Pole

Italics – Fastest Lap

† – Drivers did not finish the race, but were classified as they completed more than 75% of the race distance.
