= 2023 Euro 4 Championship =

Motor racing events in Spain and Italy

Seasons
- ← none 2024 →

The 2023 Euro 4 Championship was the inaugural season of the Euro 4 Championship. It was a multi-event motor racing championship for open wheel, formula racing cars regulated according to FIA Formula 4 regulations, run by ACI Sport and WSK Promotion. The championship uses Tatuus F4-T421 chassis. The inaugural championship was won by Ugo Ugochukwu.

== Teams and drivers ==
Team	No.	Driver	Class	Rounds
(Italy) Prema Racing	3	(United States) Ugo Ugochukwu		All
(Italy) Prema Racing	8	(Finland) Tuukka Taponen	R	All
(Italy) Prema Racing	13	(Australia) James Wharton		All
(Italy) Prema Racing	14	(United Arab Emirates) Rashid Al Dhaheri	R	All
(Italy) Prema Racing	16	(Brazil) Aurelia Nobels (Note: Nobels is a Belgian-Brazilian driver competing under a Brazilian licence.)	W	All
(Italy) Prema Racing	23	(United Kingdom) Arvid Lindblad	R	All
(Italy) Prema Racing	47	(Italy) Nicola Lacorte	R	All
(Italy) Prema Racing	51	(United Kingdom) Freddie Slater	R	2–3
(Netherlands) Van Amersfoort Racing	4	(France) Pablo Sarrazin		1–2
(Netherlands) Van Amersfoort Racing	10	(Peru) Rafael Modonese	R	2–3
(Netherlands) Van Amersfoort Racing	11	(Uzbekistan) Ismoilkhuja Akhmedkhodjaev		1–2
(Netherlands) Van Amersfoort Racing	15	(Italy) Brando Badoer		All
(Netherlands) Van Amersfoort Racing	17	(Portugal) Ivan Domingues		1–2
(Netherlands) Van Amersfoort Racing	30	(Denmark) Frederik Lund		All
(Netherlands) Van Amersfoort Racing	45	(Australia) Jack Beeton	R	1–2
(Netherlands) Van Amersfoort Racing	53	(Italy) Giacomo Pedrini	R	3
(Netherlands) Van Amersfoort Racing	74	(Netherlands) Lin Hodenius	R	3
(San Marino) AKM Motorsport	5	(Italy) Davide Larini	R	1–2
(San Marino) AKM Motorsport	6	(Australia) Kamal Mrad	R	2
(San Marino) AKM Motorsport	21	(Switzerland) Tina Hausmann	R W	All
(San Marino) AKM Motorsport	22	(France) Enzo Deligny	R	2
(San Marino) AKM Motorsport	86	(Mexico) Diego de la Torre		All
(Italy) BVM Racing	9	(Italy) Alfio Spina		1–2
(Italy) BVM Racing	71	(Australia) Griffin Peebles	R	2
(Italy) BVM Racing	88	(Australia) Griffin Peebles	R	1
(Germany) US Racing	12	(Australia) Gianmarco Pradel	R	All
(Germany) US Racing	20	(Malta) Zachary David	R	All
(Germany) US Racing	31	(United Kingdom) Akshay Bohra (Note: Bohra is an American-Indian driver competing under a British licence.)	R	All
(Germany) US Racing	37	(Poland) Kacper Sztuka		1–2
(Germany) US Racing	66	(China) Ruiqi Liu	R	All
(Germany) PHM Racing	53	(Italy) Giacomo Pedrini	R	2
(Germany) PHM Racing	57	(Thailand) Nandhavud Bhirombhakdi		1–2
(France) R-ace GP	76	(France) Raphaël Narac		1
(France) R-ace GP	93	(United Arab Emirates) Matteo Quintarelli (Note: Quintarelli is an Italian-Emirati driver competing under an Emirati licence.)	R	1
(United Kingdom) Argenti Motorsport	95	(China) Yuanpu Cui		3
(Italy) Cram Motorsport	96	(Italy) Flavio Olivieri		2
(Italy) Cram Motorsport	97	(India) Kai Daryanani		2

Icon	Legend
R	Rookie
W	Woman Trophy
G	Guest drivers ineligible to score points

== Race calendar and results ==
The calendar was officially revealed on 26 April 2023.

Round		Circuit	Date	Pole position	Fastest lap	Winning driver	Winning team	Secondary class winner	Supporting
1	R1	(Italy) Mugello Circuit, Scarperia e San Piero	8 July	(Poland) Kacper Sztuka	(United Kingdom) Arvid Lindblad	(United States) Ugo Ugochukwu	(Italy) Prema Racing	R: (United Kingdom) Akshay Bohra; W: (Brazil) Aurelia Nobels	Formula Regional European Championship; Italian GT Championship; Porsche Carrera Cup Italia; TCR Italy Touring Car Championship
1	R2	(Italy) Mugello Circuit, Scarperia e San Piero	9 July	(United Kingdom) Arvid Lindblad	(United States) Ugo Ugochukwu	(United States) Ugo Ugochukwu	(Italy) Prema Racing	R: (United Kingdom) Akshay Bohra; W: (Switzerland) Tina Hausmann	Formula Regional European Championship; Italian GT Championship; Porsche Carrera Cup Italia; TCR Italy Touring Car Championship
1	R3	(Italy) Mugello Circuit, Scarperia e San Piero	9 July	(Australia) James Wharton	(Malta) Zachary David	(Australia) James Wharton	(Italy) Prema Racing	R: (United Kingdom) Arvid Lindblad; W: (Switzerland) Tina Hausmann	Formula Regional European Championship; Italian GT Championship; Porsche Carrera Cup Italia; TCR Italy Touring Car Championship
2	R1	(Italy) Monza Circuit, Monza	16 September	(United Kingdom) Freddie Slater	(United Kingdom) Arvid Lindblad	(Poland) Kacper Sztuka	(Germany) US Racing	R: (United Kingdom) Arvid Lindblad; W: (Switzerland) Tina Hausmann	Formula Regional European Championship; Italian GT Championship; Porsche Carrera Cup Italia; TCR Italy Touring Car Championship; Italian Prototype Championship
2	R2	(Italy) Monza Circuit, Monza	17 September	(Poland) Kacper Sztuka	(Poland) Kacper Sztuka	(Poland) Kacper Sztuka	(Germany) US Racing	R: (United Kingdom) Arvid Lindblad; W: (Switzerland) Tina Hausmann	Formula Regional European Championship; Italian GT Championship; Porsche Carrera Cup Italia; TCR Italy Touring Car Championship; Italian Prototype Championship
2	R3	(Italy) Monza Circuit, Monza	17 September	(Poland) Kacper Sztuka	(Poland) Kacper Sztuka	(United Kingdom) Arvid Lindblad	(Italy) Prema Racing	R: (United Kingdom) Arvid Lindblad; W: (Switzerland) Tina Hausmann	Formula Regional European Championship; Italian GT Championship; Porsche Carrera Cup Italia; TCR Italy Touring Car Championship; Italian Prototype Championship
3	R1	(Spain) Circuit de Barcelona-Catalunya, Montmeló	21 October	(United Kingdom) Akshay Bohra	(United Kingdom) Akshay Bohra	(United Kingdom) Akshay Bohra (Note: James Wharton finished first but received a 5-second penalty for leaving the track and gaining an advantage. Akshay Bohra inherited the win.)	(Germany) US Racing	R: (United Kingdom) Akshay Bohra; W: (Brazil) Aurelia Nobels	International GT Open; Euroformula Open; GT Cup Open Europe; TCR Europe Touring Car Series
3	R2	(Spain) Circuit de Barcelona-Catalunya, Montmeló	22 October	(United Kingdom) Akshay Bohra	(Australia) James Wharton	(Australia) James Wharton	(Italy) Prema Racing	R: (Finland) Tuukka Taponen; W: (Brazil) Aurelia Nobels	International GT Open; Euroformula Open; GT Cup Open Europe; TCR Europe Touring Car Series
3	R3	(Spain) Circuit de Barcelona-Catalunya, Montmeló	22 October	(United States) Ugo Ugochukwu	(United States) Ugo Ugochukwu	(United States) Ugo Ugochukwu	(Italy) Prema Racing	R: (Finland) Tuukka Taponen; W: (Switzerland) Tina Hausmann	International GT Open; Euroformula Open; GT Cup Open Europe; TCR Europe Touring Car Series

== Championship standings ==
Points are awarded to the top 10 classified finishers in each race. No points are awarded for pole position or fastest lap. For round 3, double points were awarded.

Round 1 & 2 points system

Position	**1st**	**2nd**	**3rd**	**4th**	**5th**	**6th**	**7th**	**8th**	**9th**	**10th**
Points	25	18	15	12	10	8	6	4	2	1

Round 3 points system

Position	**1st**	**2nd**	**3rd**	**4th**	**5th**	**6th**	**7th**	**8th**	**9th**	**10th**
Points	50	36	30	24	20	16	12	8	4	2

=== Drivers' championship ===
Pos	Driver	MUG (Italy)			MNZ (Italy)			CAT (Spain)			Pts
Pos	Driver	R1	R2	R3	R1	R2 (Note: Due to a communication mistake between race control and marshalls after a re-start on lap 9, race results were declared official at the completion of lap 8. Half points were awarded as less than 75% of the race distance was officially completed.)	R3	R1	R2	R3	Pts
1	(United States) Ugo Ugochukwu	1	1	2	4	7	21	4	2	**1**	193
2	(Australia) James Wharton	6	3	**1**	3	8	Ret	3	1	4	169
3	(United States) Akshay Bohra	3	2	6	5	5	3	**1**	**6**	8	145
4	(United Kingdom) Arvid Lindblad	4	**4**	5	2	2	1	2	10	11	124
5	(Finland) Tuukka Taponen	8	18	8	Ret	6	5	5	3	3	102
6	(Italy) Brando Badoer	9	DNS	10	13	3	2	6	8	2	88.5
7	(Malta) Zachary David	7	5	22	Ret	21	4	8	5	5	76
8	(Poland) Kacper Sztuka	**2**	8	3	1	**1**	**Ret**				74.5
9	(Italy) Nicola Lacorte	5	24†	7	Ret	10	10	Ret	4	6	57.5
10	(United Kingdom) Freddie Slater				**24**	4	26†	7	Ret	7	30
11	(Portugal) Ivan Domingues	11	23	4	6	13	6				28
12	(United Arab Emirates) Rashid Al Dhaheri	14	6	11	7	9	7	10	15	9	27
13	(Australia) Gianmarco Pradel	12	9	12	8	11	8	9	Ret	10	16
14	(China) Ruiqi Liu	Ret	15	9	21	22	12	11	7	12	14
15	(Australia) Jack Beeton	18	7	Ret	WD	WD	WD				6
16	(Italy) Alfio Spina	Ret	10	Ret	9	Ret	9				5
17	(Denmark) Frederik Lund	24†	13	14	14	14	13	14	9	14	4
18	(France) Raphaël Narac	10	11	18							1
19	(France) Enzo Deligny				10	Ret	24				1
20	(Switzerland) Tina Hausmann	23	21	17	11	23	16	16	13	13	0
21	(Thailand) Nandhavud Bhirombhakdi	13	19	13	Ret	20	11				0
22	(Brazil) Aurelia Nobels	19	22	20	15	Ret	WD	13	11	17	0
23	(France) Pablo Sarrazin	17	12	15	22	12	15				0
24	(Netherlands) Lin Hodenius							12	12	16	0
25	(Australia) Griffin Peebles	15	14	23	12	15	22				0
26	(Mexico) Diego de la Torre	22	25†	21	16	18	18	17	14	15	0
27	(India) Kai Daryanani				20	16	14				0
28	(Italy) Giacomo Pedrini				18	25†	25	15	Ret	Ret	0
29	(Italy) Davide Larini	20	16	16	17	Ret	17				0
30	(United Arab Emirates) Matteo Quintarelli	16	17	19							0
31	(Peru) Rafael Modonese				Ret	17	19	WD	WD	WD	0
32	(Australia) Kamal Mrad				19	19	20				0
33	(Uzbekistan) Ismoilkhuja Akhmedkhodjaev	21	20	Ret	Ret	24	23				0
34	(Italy) Flavio Olivieri				23	Ret	27†				0
–	(China) Yuanpu Cui							WD	WD	WD	0
Pos	Driver	R1	R2	R3	R1	R2	R3	R1	R2	R3	Pts
Pos	Driver	MUG (Italy)			MNZ (Italy)			CAT (Spain)			Pts

Colour	Result
Gold	Winner
Silver	Second place
Bronze	Third place
Green	Points classification
Blue	Non-points classification
Blue	Non-classified finish (NC)
Purple	Retired, not classified (Ret)
Red	Did not qualify (DNQ)
Red	Did not pre-qualify (DNPQ)
Black	Disqualified (DSQ)
White	Did not start (DNS)
White	Withdrew (WD)
White	Race cancelled (C)
Blank	Did not practice (DNP)
Blank	Did not arrive (DNA)
Blank	Excluded (EX)

**Bold** – Pole
Italics – Fastest Lap
† — Did not finish, but classified

=== Secondary classes standings ===
Pos	Driver	MUG (Italy)			MNZ (Italy)			CAT (Spain)			Pts
Pos	Driver	R1	R2	R3	R1	R2	R3	R1	R2	R3	Pts
Rookies' championship
1	(United Kingdom) Akshay Bohra	1	1	2	2	3	2	1	4	5	180
2	(Finland) Tuukka Taponen	5	11	4	Ret	4	4	3	1	1	170
3	(United Kingdom) Arvid Lindblad	2	2	1	1	1	1	2	6	8	163
4	(Malta) Zachary David	4	3	11	Ret	10	3	5	3	2	128
5	(Italy) Nicola Lacorte	3	13	3	Ret	6	7	Ret	2	3	106
6	(United Arab Emirates) Rashid Al Dhaheri	8	4	6	3	5	5	7	9	6	78
7	(Australia) Gianmarco Pradel	7	6	7	4	7	6	6	Ret	7	68
8	(United Kingdom) Freddie Slater				12	2	16	4	Ret	4	57
9	(China) Ruiqi Liu	Ret	9	5	11	11	8	8	5	9	48
10	(Switzerland) Tina Hausmann	12	12	9	6	12	10	11	8	10	21
11	(Netherlands) Lin Hodenius							9	7	11	16
12	(France) Raphaël Narac	6	7	10							15
13	(Australia) Griffin Peebles	10	8	12	7	8	13				13
14	(Australia) Jack Beeton	9	5	Ret	WD	WD	WD				12
15	(France) Enzo Deligny				5	Ret	14				10
16	(Italy) Davide Larini	11	10	8	8	Ret	12				9
17	(Italy) Giacomo Pedrini				9	13	15	10	Ret	Ret	4
18	(India) Kai Daryanani				10	9	11				2
Women's championship
1	(Switzerland) Tina Hausmann	2	1	1	1	1	1	2	2	1	222
2	(Brazil) Aurelia Nobels	1	2	2	2	Ret	WD	1	1	2	215
Pos	Driver	R1	R2	R3	R1	R2	R3	R1	R2	R3	Pts
Pos	Driver	MUG (Italy)			MNZ (Italy)			CAT (Spain)			Pts

=== Teams' championship ===
Pos	Team	Points
1	(Italy) Prema Powerteam	435
2	(Germany) US Racing	285
3	(Netherlands) Van Amersfoort Racing	125
4	(Italy) BVM Racing	5
5	(France) R-ace GP	1
6	(San Marino) AKM Motorsport	1
7	(Germany) PHM Racing	0
8	(Italy) Cram Motorsport	0

== See also ==
- 2023 Italian F4 Championship
