= US Racing =

Auto racing team based in Kerpen, Germany

(Germany) US Racing
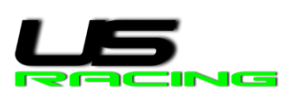
- Founded: 2015
- Founder(s): Ralf Schumacher; Gerhard Ungar
- Base: Kerpen, Germany
- Team principal(s): Ralf Schumacher; Gerhard Ungar
- Current series: Italian F4 Championship; Formula Winter Series; Euro 4 Championship
- Former series: Formula Regional European Championship; Formula 4 UAE Championship; ADAC Formula 4
- Current drivers: Italian Formula 4 (Singapore) Kabir Anurag (Australia) Jack Beeton (United Kingdom) Akshay Bohra (Brazil) Matheus Ferreira (Australia) Gianmarco Pradel (Germany) Maxim Rehm
- Teams' Championships: ADAC Formula 4: 2018, 2019; Formula Winter Series: 2023, 2025
- Drivers' Championships: ADAC Formula 4: 2018: Lirim Zendeli; 2019: Théo Pourchaire; Formula Winter Series: 2023: Kacper Sztuka; Italian F4 Championship: 2023: Kacper Sztuka; Euro 4 Championship; 2024: Akshay Bohra
- Website: https://usracing.one

US Racing is an auto racing team based in Kerpen, Germany.

== History ==
US Racing is the joint Formula 4 team of Ralf Schumacher and Gerhard Ungar. The championship team of the ADAC Formula 4 season 2015 has moved its seat to Kerpen at the end of 2015 and will be racing from the 2016 season with the new team name US Racing after HTP Motorsport ended its involvement in the team. "US Racing not only stands for the names Ungar and Schumacher, but is also intended to convey the English meaning of "we" and "us", because we want to express the team idea again. Because it is only through the commitment of every team member that you can succeed," says Ralf Schumacher. In 2018, US Racing collaborated with Charouz Racing System in the ADAC Formula 4 championship. In 2019, US Racing joined the Formula Regional European Championship and Italian F4 Championship.

== Current series results ==
=== Italian F4 Championship ===
Year	Car	Drivers	Races	Wins	Poles	Fast laps	Points	D.C.	T.C.
2019	Tatuus F4-T014	(Czech Republic) Roman Staněk	18	1	6	1	144	5th	5th
2020	Tatuus F4-T014	(United Kingdom) Oliver Bearman	8	1	0	1	85	8th	6th
2020	Tatuus F4-T014	(Russia) Vladislav Lomko	4	0	0	0	0	34th	6th
2020	Tatuus F4-T014	(Germany) Tim Tramnitz	2	0	0	0	4	24th	6th
2021	Tatuus F4-T014	(Germany) Tim Tramnitz	15	4	2	1	232	2nd	3rd
2021	Tatuus F4-T014	(Russia) Vladislav Lomko	8	0	0	0	43	11th	3rd
2021	Tatuus F4-T014	(United Kingdom) Luke Browning	3	0	0	1	27	15th	3rd
2021	Tatuus F4-T014	(Portugal) Pedro Perino†	21	0	0	0	1	33rd	3rd
2022	Tatuus F4-T421	(Republic of Ireland) Alex Dunne	20	3	1	3	258	2nd	2nd
2022	Tatuus F4-T421	(Poland) Kacper Sztuka	20	2	0	0	162	6th	2nd
2022	Tatuus F4-T421	(France) Marcus Amand	20	0	0	0	94	9th	2nd
2022	Tatuus F4-T421	(United States) Nikhil Bohra	20	0	0	0	47	13th	2nd
2022	Tatuus F4-T421	(Mozambique) Pedro Perino	20	0	0	0	8	19th	2nd
2022	Tatuus F4-T421	(Malta) Zachary David	5	0	0	0	6	20th	2nd
2022	Tatuus F4-T421	(United States) Akshay Bohra	3	0	0	0	0	36th	2nd
2023	Tatuus F4-T421	(Poland) Kacper Sztuka	21	9	9	8	315	1st	2nd
2023	Tatuus F4-T421	(Malta) Zachary David	21	0	0	2	144	7th	2nd
2023	Tatuus F4-T421	(United Kingdom) Akshay Bohra	21	0	0	0	113	8th	2nd
2023	Tatuus F4-T421	(Australia) Gianmarco Pradel	21	0	0	0	42	13th	2nd
2023	Tatuus F4-T421	(China) Ruiqi Liu	21	0	0	0	0	30th	2nd
2023	Tatuus F4-T421	(Singapore) Kabir Anurag†	9	0	0	0	0	41st	2nd
2024	Tatuus F4-T421	(Australia) Jack Beeton	21	1	2	3	222	2nd	2nd
2024	Tatuus F4-T421	(India) Akshay Bohra	21	1	4	2	217	4th	2nd
2024	Tatuus F4-T421	(Australia) Gianmarco Pradel	21	1	0	0	110	7th	2nd
2024	Tatuus F4-T421	(Brazil) Matheus Ferreira	13	0	0	0	49	12th	2nd
2024	Tatuus F4-T421	(Germany) Maxim Rehm	21	0	0	0	39	13th	2nd
2024	Tatuus F4-T421	(United Kingdom) Edu Robinson†	21	0	0	0	10	19th	2nd
2024	Tatuus F4-T421	(Singapore) Kabir Anurag	21	0	0	0	10	20th	2nd
2025	Tatuus F4-T421	(Brazil) Gabriel Gomez	20	4	4	2	267	2nd	2nd
2025	Tatuus F4-T421	(Finland) Luka Sammalisto	20	0	0	3	132	8th	2nd
2025	Tatuus F4-T421	(Singapore) Kabir Anurag	20	0	0	1	35	16th	2nd
2025	Tatuus F4-T421	(Serbia) Andrija Kostić	20	0	0	1	33	17th	2nd
2025	Tatuus F4-T421	(Germany) Maxim Rehm	14	0	0	0	27	19th	2nd
2025	Tatuus F4-T421	(Czech Republic) Jan Koller	14	0	0	0	0	34th	2nd
2025	Tatuus F4-T421	(Italy) Ludovico Busso†	18	0	0	0	0	36th	2nd
2025	Tatuus F4-T421	(India) Ary Bansal	3	0	0	0	0	39th	2nd
2026	Tatuus F4-T421	(Finland) Luka Sammalisto							
2026	Tatuus F4-T421	(Spain) Edu Robinson							
2026	Tatuus F4-T421	(Australia) Noah Killion							
2026	Tatuus F4-T421	(Ukraine) Oleksandr Savinkov							
2026	Tatuus F4-T421	(Italy) Ludovico Busso							
2026	Tatuus F4-T421	(India) Ary Bansal							
2026	Tatuus F4-T421	(Germany) Arjen Kräling							
2026	Tatuus F4-T421	(Italy) Iacopo Martinese							

† Shared results with other teams

=== Euro 4 Championship ===
Year	Car	Drivers	Races	Wins	Poles	Fast laps	Points	D.C.	T.C.
2023	Tatuus F4-T421	(United Kingdom) Akshay Bohra	9	1	2	1	145	3rd	2nd
2023	Tatuus F4-T421	(Malta) Zachary David	9	0	0	1	76	7th	2nd
2023	Tatuus F4-T421	(Poland) Kacper Sztuka	6	2	3	2	74.5	8th	2nd
2023	Tatuus F4-T421	(Australia) Gianmarco Pradel	9	0	0	0	16	13th	2nd
2023	Tatuus F4-T421	(China) Ruiqi Liu	9	0	0	0	14	14th	2nd
2024	Tatuus F4-T421	(India) Akshay Bohra	9	2	3	1	124	1st	2nd
2024	Tatuus F4-T421	(Germany) Maxim Rehm	9	1	1	0	63	6th	2nd
2024	Tatuus F4-T421	(Australia) Jack Beeton	9	0	0	0	51	8th	2nd
2024	Tatuus F4-T421	(Australia) Gianmarco Pradel	9	0	0	1	49	10th	2nd
2024	Tatuus F4-T421	(United Kingdom) Edu Robinson	6	0	0	0	6	16th	2nd
2024	Tatuus F4-T421	(Singapore) Kabir Anurag	9	0	0	0	4	18th	2nd
2025	Tatuus F4-T421	(Brazil) Gabriel Gomez	9	2	1	2	134	2nd	2nd
2025	Tatuus F4-T421	(Singapore) Kabir Anurag	9	0	0	0	68	6th	2nd
2025	Tatuus F4-T421	(Serbia) Andrija Kostić	9	0	0	0	26	10th	2nd
2025	Tatuus F4-T421	(Germany) Arjen Kräling	6	0	0	0	6	17th	2nd
2025	Tatuus F4-T421	(India) Ary Bansal	9	0	0	1	2	19th	2nd
2025	Tatuus F4-T421	(Italy) Ludovico Busso†	9	0	0	0	0	23rd	2nd

† Busso drove for Viola Formula Racing in round 1.

=== Formula Winter Series ===
Year	Car	Drivers	Races	Wins	Poles	Fast laps	Points	D.C.	T.C
2023	Tatuus F4-T421	(Poland) Kacper Sztuka	6	5	4	4	151	1st	N/A
2023	Tatuus F4-T421	(Australia) Gianmarco Pradel	8	0	1	0	116	2nd	N/A
2023	Tatuus F4-T421	(Denmark) Frederik Lund	8	0	0	1	106	3rd	N/A
2023	Tatuus F4-T421	(China) Ruiqi Liu	8	0	0	1	96	4th	N/A
2023	Tatuus F4-T421	(Malta) Zachary David	2	2	1	2	53	5th	N/A
2023	Tatuus F4-T421	(Singapore) Akshay Bohra	2	0	0	0	28	9th	N/A
2024	Tatuus F4-T421	(Australia) Gianmarco Pradel	11	0	0	0	79	4th	2nd
2024	Tatuus F4-T421	(Brazil) Matheus Ferreira	8	1	0	1	75	5th	2nd
2024	Tatuus F4-T421	(Australia) Jack Beeton	5	0	0	0	52	10th	2nd
2024	Tatuus F4-T421	(India) Akshay Bohra	11	0	0	0	49	11th	2nd
2024	Tatuus F4-T421	(Singapore) Kabir Anurag	11	0	0	1	25	14th	2nd
2024	Tatuus F4-T421	(Germany) Maxim Rehm	11	0	0	0	9	21st	2nd
2025	Tatuus F4-T421	(Brazil) Gabriel Gomez	12	3	4	3	204	1st	1st
2025	Tatuus F4-T421	(Singapore) Kabir Anurag	11	2	1	3	138	4th	1st
2025	Tatuus F4-T421	(Germany) Maxim Rehm	12	1	1	1	87	6th	1st
2025	Tatuus F4-T421	(Serbia) Andrija Kostić	12	0	0	0	40	11th	1st
2025	Tatuus F4-T421	(Spain) Edu Robinson	6	0	1	0	38	12th	1st
2025	Tatuus F4-T421	(Finland) Luka Sammalisto	6	0	0	0	30	13th	1st
2025	Tatuus F4-T421	(Czech Republic) Jan Koller	6	0	0	0	2	21st	1st
2026	Tatuus F4-T421	(India) Ary Bansal	15	2	0	2	148	3rd	2nd
2026	Tatuus F4-T421	(Italy) Oleksandr Savinkov	15	1	0	0	123	4th	2nd
2026	Tatuus F4-T421	(Germany) Arjen Kräling	15	1	1	3	74	8th	2nd
2026	Tatuus F4-T421	(Italy) Ludovico Busso	15	0	0	0	61	11th	2nd
2026	Tatuus F4-T421	(Australia) Noah Killion	15	0	0	0	24	16th	2nd
2026	Tatuus F4-T421	(United Kingdom) Roman Kamyab	9	0	0	0	2	27th	2nd

== Former series results ==
=== Formula Regional European Championship ===
Year	Car	Drivers	Races	Wins	Poles	Fast laps	Points	D.C.	T.C.
2019	Tatuus F3 T-318	(Germany) David Schumacher	23	4	5	3	285	4th	3rd
2019	Tatuus F3 T-318	(Argentina) Marcos Siebert	11	0	0	1	70	8th	3rd
2019	Tatuus F3 T-318	(Germany) Lirim Zendeli	3	0	0	0	42	14th	3rd

=== Formula 4 UAE Championship ===
Year	Car	Drivers	Races	Wins	Poles	Fast laps	Points	D.C.	T.C.
2017–18	Tatuus F4-T014	(Germany) David Schumacher	19	3	5	4	325	2nd	3rd
2017–18	Tatuus F4-T014	(Czech Republic) Tom Beckhäuser†	22	1	0	1	262	3rd	3rd
2017–18	Tatuus F4-T014	(Czech Republic) Petr Ptáček	10	0	0	0	80	10th	3rd
2017–18	Tatuus F4-T014	(Germany) Leon Köhler	3	2	0	0	58	12th	3rd

†Beckhäuser drove for Cram Motorsport in the first four rounds and again in round 6.

=== ADAC Formula 4 ===
Year	Car	Drivers	Races	Wins	Poles	Fast laps	Points	D.C.	T.C.
2015	Tatuus F4-T014	(Germany) Marvin Dienst	24	8	7	6	347	1st	N/A
2015	Tatuus F4-T014	(Netherlands) Janeau Esmeijer	24	0	5	2	136	7th	N/A
2015	Tatuus F4-T014	(Germany) Carrie Schreiner	18	0	0	0	0	44th	N/A
2016	Tatuus F4-T014	(Germany) Kim-Luis Schramm	24	1	1	3	138	5th	4th
2016	Tatuus F4-T014	(Germany) Jannes Fittje	24	0	0	1	133	7th	4th
2016	Tatuus F4-T014	(United Kingdom) Louis Gachot	24	0	0	0	1	29th	4th
2016	Tatuus F4-T014	(Germany) Carrie Schreiner	24	0	0	0	0	43rd	4th
2017	Tatuus F4-T014	(Switzerland) Fabio Scherer	21	1	0	1	154.5	5th	4th
2017	Tatuus F4-T014	(Denmark) Nicklas Nielsen	21	1	1	1	128	6th	4th
2017	Tatuus F4-T014	(Germany) Kim-Luis Schramm	21	1	1	1	95	8th	4th
2017	Tatuus F4-T014	(Germany) Julian Hanses	21	1	3	1	82	11th	4th
2018	Tatuus F4-T014	(Czech Republic) Petr Ptáček	3	0	0	0	0	NC†	1st
2018	Tatuus F4-T014	(Germany) David Schumacher	21	0	0	0	103	9th	1st
2018	Tatuus F4-T014	(Austria) Mick Wishofer	21	1	0	3	160	6th	1st
2018	Tatuus F4-T014	(Germany) Lirim Zendeli	21	10	8	8	348	1st	1st
2018	Tatuus F4-T014	(Czech Republic) Tom Beckhäuser	21	0	0	0	4	21st	1st
2019	Tatuus F4-T014	(Czech Republic) Roman Staněk	20	2	0	1	165	4th	1st
2019	Tatuus F4-T014	(Monaco) Arthur Leclerc	20	1	1	2	202	3rd	1st
2019	Tatuus F4-T014	(France) Théo Pourchaire	20	4	6	2	258	1st	1st
2019	Tatuus F4-T014	(France) Alessandro Ghiretti	20	0	0	0	136	6th	1st
2020	Tatuus F4-T014	(Finland) Elias Seppänen	21	1	1	0	257	3rd	2nd
2020	Tatuus F4-T014	(Germany) Tim Tramnitz	21	1	0	0	226	4th	2nd
2020	Tatuus F4-T014	(United Kingdom) Oliver Bearman	21	1	0	1	144	7th	2nd
2020	Tatuus F4-T014	(Russia) Vladislav Lomko	21	2	0	2	133	8th	2nd
2021	Tatuus F4-T014	(Germany) Tim Tramnitz	18	5	5	2	269	2nd	2nd
2021	Tatuus F4-T014	(United Kingdom) Luke Browning	18	2	0	2	220	3rd	2nd
2021	Tatuus F4-T014	(Russia) Vladislav Lomko	18	1	0	0	133	6th	2nd
2021	Tatuus F4-T014	(Republic of Ireland) Alex Dunne	8	0	2	2	74	8th	2nd
2022	Tatuus F4-T421	(Portugal) Pedro Perino	3	0	0	0	0	NC†	4th
2022	Tatuus F4-T421	(Poland) Kacper Sztuka	5	0	0	0	64	10th	4th
2022	Tatuus F4-T421	(United States) Nikhil Bohra	6	0	0	0	10	16th	4th
2022	Tatuus F4-T421	(France) Marcus Amand	5	0	0	0	48	12th	4th
2022	Tatuus F4-T421	(Malta) Zachary David	3	0	0	0	22	15th	4th
2022	Tatuus F4-T421	(China) Ruiqi Liu	3	0	0	0	4	19th	4th

== Timeline ==
Current series
Italian F4 Championship	2019–present
Formula Winter Series	2023–present
Euro 4 Championship	2023–present
Former series
ADAC Formula 4	2015–2022
Formula 4 UAE Championship	2017–2018
Formula Regional European Championship	2019
Prototype Cup Germany	2024

Achievements
Preceded by Prema Powerteam	ADAC Formula 4 Teams' Champion; 2018–2019	Succeeded by Van Amersfoort Racing
