= Zachary David =

Filipino racing driver (born 2007)

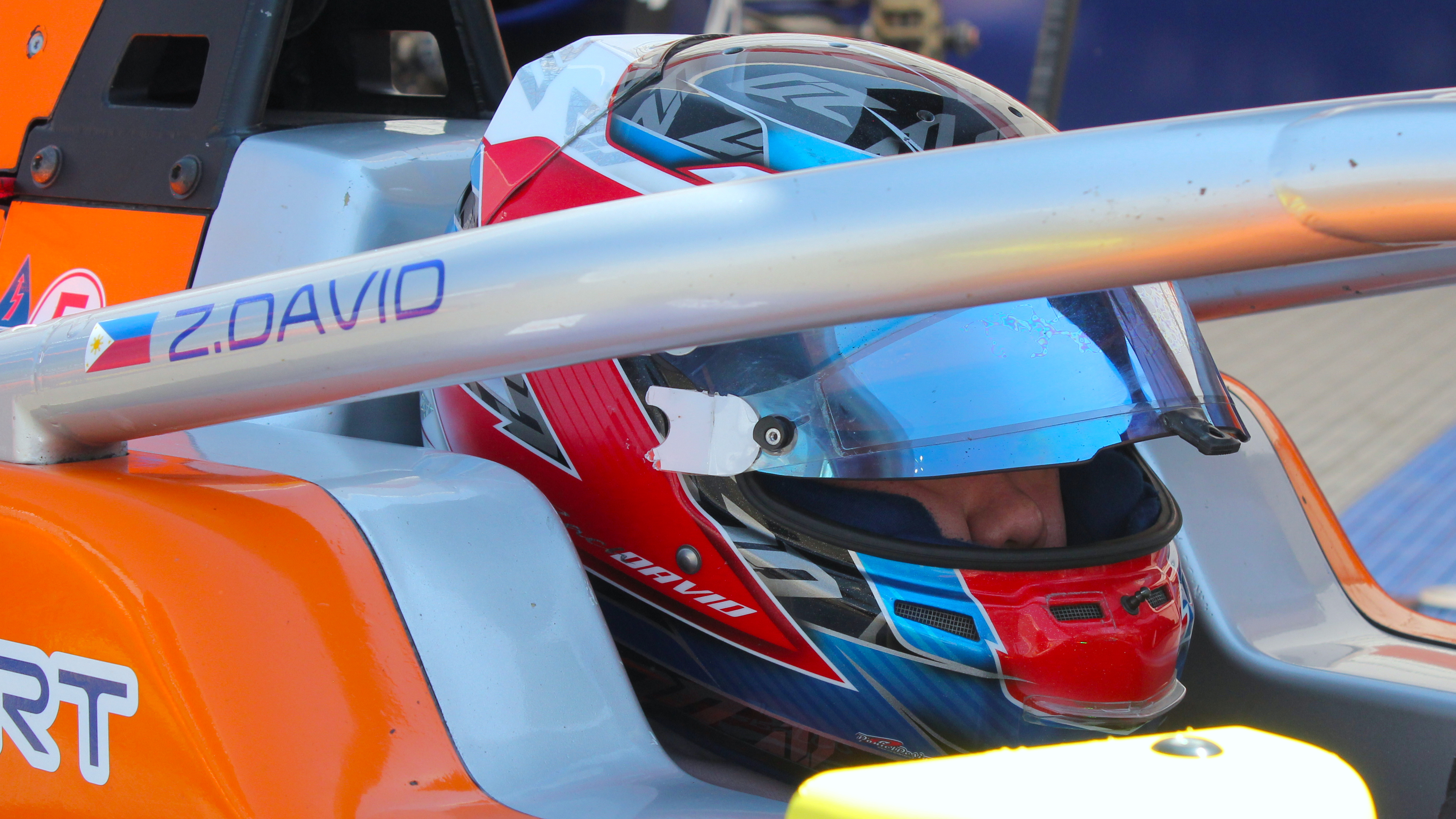
- David in 2025
- Nationality: (Philippines) Filipino
- Born: 14 August 2007 (age 19) Santa Ana, Manila, Philippines

Formula Regional European Championship career
- Debut season: 2024
- Car number: 20
- Former teams: R-ace GP
- Starts: 20
- Wins: 0
- Podiums: 1
- Poles: 0
- Fastest laps: 0
- Best finish: 14th in 2024

Super Formula Lights career
- Debut season: 2025
- Current team: B-Max Racing Team
- Car number: 51
- Starts: 3
- Wins: 0
- Podiums: 0
- Poles: 0
- Fastest laps: 0

Previous series
- 2024; 2023; 2023; 2023; 2022–2023; 2022: FR Middle East; F4 UAE; Formula Winter Series; Euro 4; Italian F4; ADAC F4

Zachary David (born 14 August 2007) is a Filipino racing driver who last competed in Super Formula Lights for B-Max and part-time in the Formula Regional European Championship for CL Motorsport.

David lived in Malta and competed under a Maltese racing licence.

== Career ==
=== Karting ===
David's karting career began in the Philippines as a child. He continued karting in the Philippines and Asia while taking numerous national and regional championships. David began karting in Europe in 2019, taking part in the WSK Euro Series and WSK Super Master Series where he finished in 35th and 56th, respectively. He made the jump up to OKJ category later that year, and finished 12th in the Karting Academy Trophy.

In 2020, David continued karting in both Europe and Asia, where he managed to finish eight in the FIA Karting Trophy and improved to 32nd in WSK Euro OK Junior. David began karting in Europe full time in 2021, finishing the WSK Final Cup in ninth and the South Garda Winter Cup in seventh.

In 2022, David became a member of the Sauber Karting Team.

=== Formula 4 ===
==== 2022 ====
David made his single seater debut during the ADAC Formula 4 Championship with US Racing during the Lausitzring round. Later that year, he again participated with US Racing for the Italian F4 Championship in five races.

==== 2023 ====
In 2023, David competed in a full season of Italian F4 and Euro 4, continuing with US Racing. He finished the Italian F4 season in seventh, after acquiring 144 points and 4 podiums.

David also competed in the Formula 4 UAE Championship with R-ace GP. His first and only win of the season would come during Round 2, when he secured the victory at Kuwait Motor Town.

During the 2023 Formula Winter Series, David participated in Round 4 at Circuit de Barcelona-Catalunya, where he secured two dominating victories. He started the first race in third, and worked his way up to win the race. During the second race, he started from pole position and maintain the lead until the end. He secured the fastest lap during both races.

=== Formula Regional ===
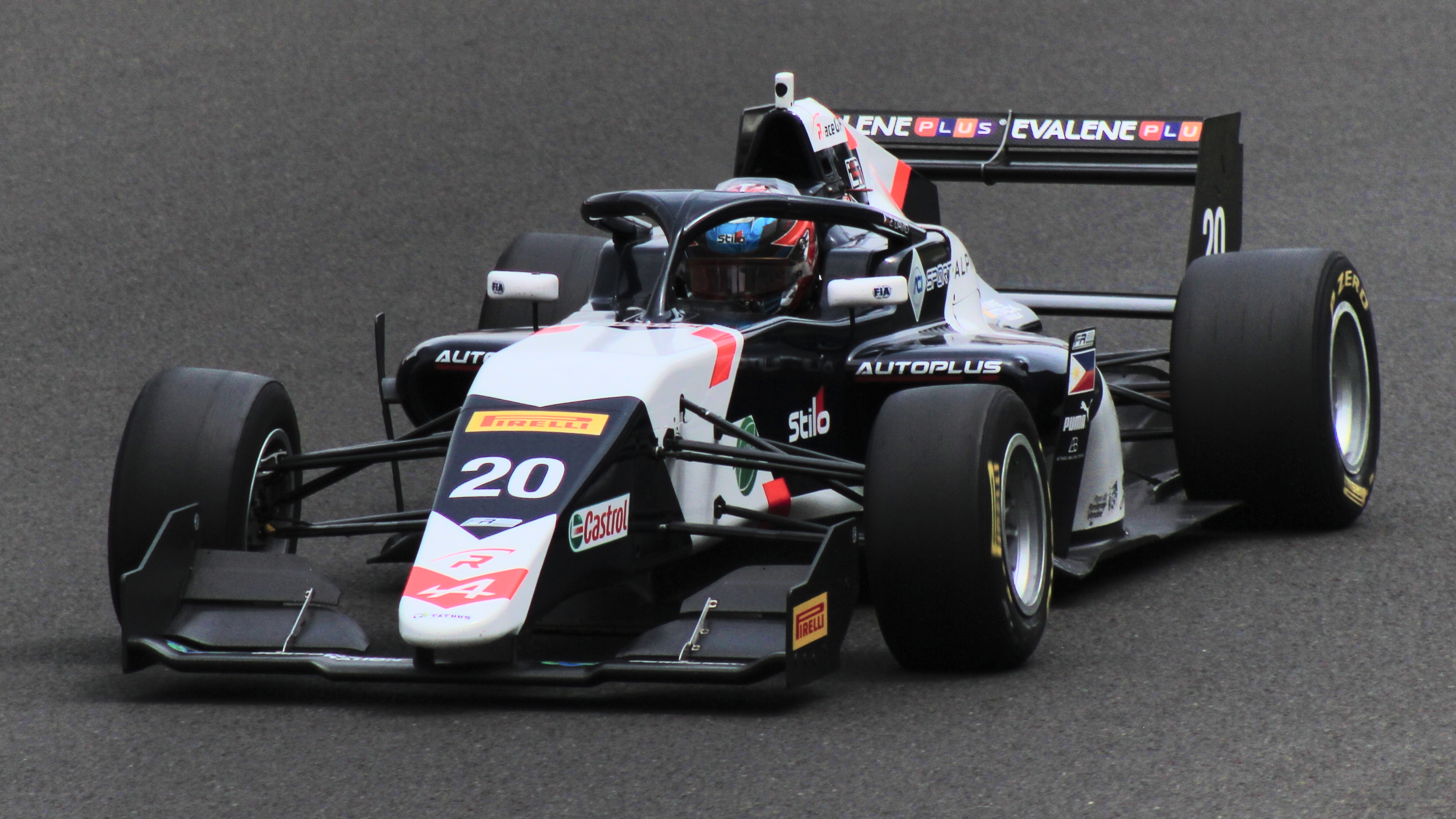
David at the Hungaroring during the 2024 Formula Regional European Championship

==== 2024 ====
David made his Formula Regional debut during the 2024 Formula Regional Middle East Championship with R-ace GP. David finished the championship in fourth, while securing four podium finishes and a total of 112 points.

David also competed in the 2024 Formula Regional European Championship, once again with R-ace. During the season, David would be paired with Tuukka Taponen and Enzo Deligny. He would finish the season in 13th, after acquiring 58 points.

==== 2025 ====
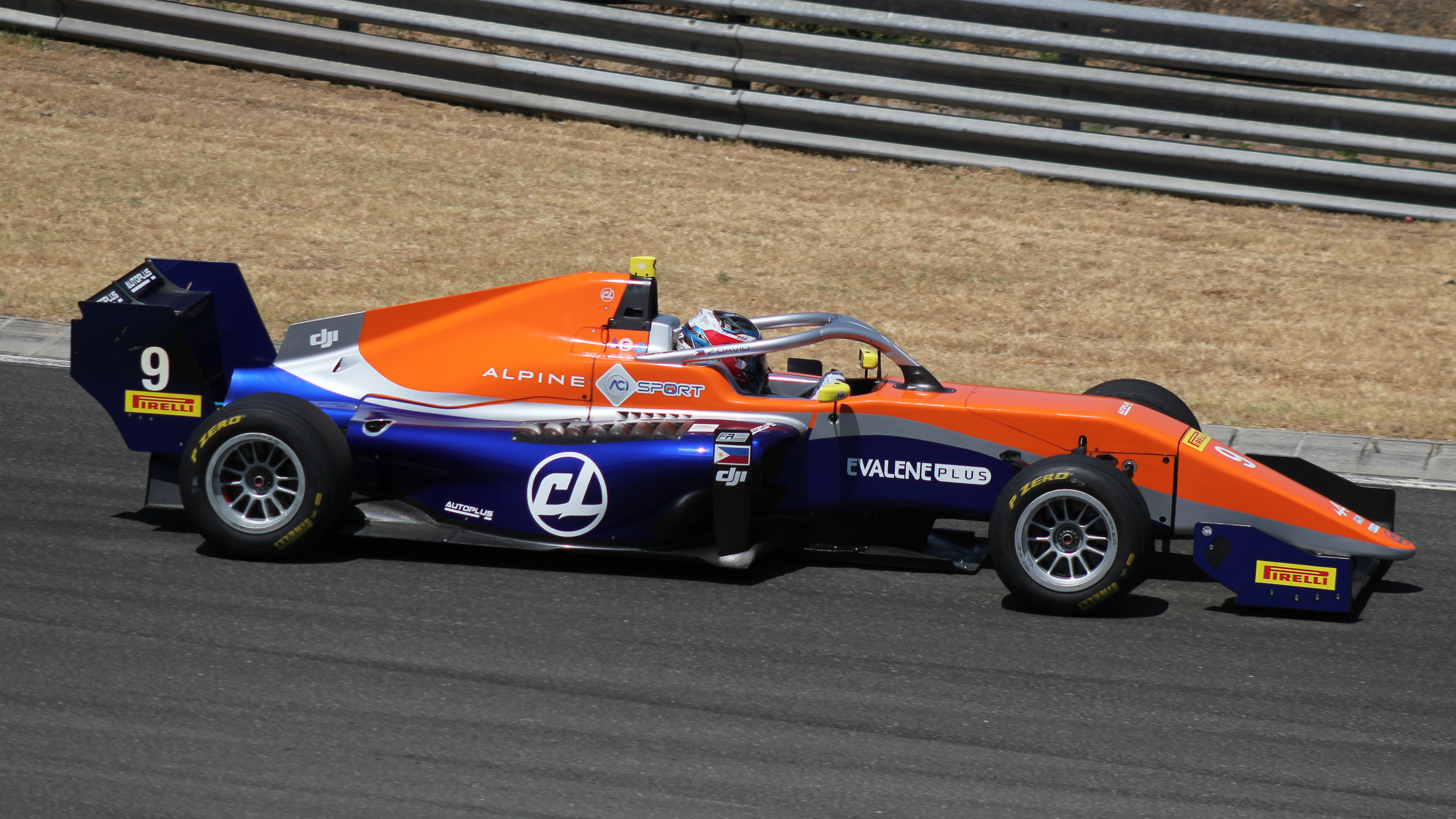
David driving at the Hungaroring during the 2025 Formula Regional European Championship

David continued his FRECA campaign in 2025, moving to CL Motorsport. However, he only competed in the championship part-time as he only made his debut during the fourth round at the Hungaroring.

=== Super Formula Lights ===
Alongside his Formula Regional campaign, David would also compete in the 2025 Super Formula Lights with B-Max Racing Team.

== Karting record ==
=== Karting career summary ===
Season	Series	Team	Position
2015	Philippine Open Karting Series - Micro		1st
2018	Macao Int. Kart Grand Prix - Mini ROK	IS Racing	2nd
2018	Super Kart Series Philippines - Cadet		1st
2018	Super Kart Series Philippines - Mini ROK		1st
2019	WSK Champions Cup - 60 Mini	KR Motorsport	20th
2019	WSK Open Cup - OK Junior	KR Motorsport	41st
2019	WSK Super Master Series - 60 Mini	KR Motorsport	56th
2019	WSK Euro Series - 60 Mini	KR Motorsport	35th
2019	FIA Karting Academy Trophy	Philippines	12th
2019	48° Trofeo delle Industrie - OK Junior	Team Driver Racing Kart	15th
2019	IAME Series Asia - Cadet	I.S Racing	33rd
2019	IAME Asia Cup - Cadet	I.S Racing	1st
2019	IAME Series Asia - Junior	I.S Racing	8th
2019	IAME Asia Final - Junior	I.S Racing	7th
2020	IAME Asia Cup - Junior	IS Racing	11th
2020	FIA Karting Academy Trophy	Philippines	8th
2020	WSK Euro Series - OK Junior	Kart Republic Motorsport	32nd
2020	IAME Euro Series 2021 - X30 Junior		51st
2021	WSK Super Master Series - OK Junior		24th
2021	WSK Euro Series - OK Junior		41st
2021	WSK Open Cup - OK		13th
2021	WSK Final Cup - OK		9th
2021	Champions of the Future - OK Junior		24th
2021	FIA Karting European Champ - OK Junior		53rd
2021	26° South Garda Winter Cup - OK		7th
2022	Champ. of the Future - Winter Series - OK	Sauber Academy	32nd
2022	FIA Karting European Championship - OK	Sauber Academy	18th
2022	FIA Karting World Championship - OK	Sauber Academy	9th
2022	Italian ACI Karting Championship - OK	Sauber Academy	5th

=== Complete Macao International Kart Grand Prix results ===
Year	Series	Team	Class	Pre-Final	Final
2015	Asian Karting Open Championship	Formula E Racing Team	Mini ROK	?	?
2016	Asian Karting Open Championship	Empire Racing Team	Mini ROK	?	?
2017	Asian Karting Open Championship	VS Racing Team	Mini ROK	21st	9th
2018	Asian Karting Open Championship	IS Racing Team	Mini ROK	?	2nd
2019	Asian Karting Open Championship	IS Racing Team	Formula 125 Junior Open	2nd	2nd

=== Complete Macau Asia Karting Festival results ===
Year	Series	Team	Class	Final
2016	Asian Karting Open Championship		Mini ROK	4th
2017	Asian Karting Open Championship	Empire Racing Team	Mini ROK	1st

== Racing record ==
=== Racing career summary ===
Season	Series	Team	Races	Wins	Poles	F/Laps	Podiums	Points	Position
2022	Italian F4 Championship	US Racing	6	0	0	0	0	6	20th
2022	ADAC Formula 4 Championship	US Racing	3	0	0	0	0	22	15th
2023	Formula 4 UAE Championship	R-ace GP	15	1	0	0	2	59	8th
2023	Formula Winter Series	US Racing	2	2	1	2	2	53	5th
2023	Italian F4 Championship	US Racing	21	0	0	2	4	144	7th
2023	Euro 4 Championship	US Racing	9	0	0	1	0	76	7th
2024	Formula Regional Middle East Championship	R-ace GP	15	0	0	0	4	112	4th
2024	Formula Regional European Championship	R-ace GP	20	0	0	0	1	55	14th
2025	Super Formula Lights	B-Max Racing Team	17	0	0	0	1	25	8th
2025	Formula Regional European Championship	CL Motorsport	6	0	0	0	0	0	26th

^{*} Season still in progress.

=== Complete Italian F4 Championship results ===
(key) (Races in bold indicate pole position) (Races in italics indicate fastest lap)

Year	Team	1	2	3	4	5	6	7	8	9	10	11	12	13	14	15	16	17	18	19	20	21	22	Pos	Points
2022	US Racing	IMO; 1	IMO; 2	IMO; 3	MIS; 1	MIS; 2	MIS; 3	SPA; 1	SPA; 2	SPA; 3	VLL; 1	VLL; 2	VLL; 3	RBR; 1	RBR; 2 Ret	RBR; 3; 12	RBR; 4; 17	MNZ; 1; 33†	MNZ; 2; 7	MNZ; 3 C	MUG; 1	MUG; 2	MUG; 3	20th	6
2023	US Racing	IMO; 1; 6	IMO; 2; 3	IMO; 3	IMO; 4; 5	MIS; 1 Ret	MIS; 2; 6	MIS; 3; 3	SPA; 1; 2	SPA; 2; 6	SPA; 3; 2	MNZ; 1; 26†	MNZ; 2; 11	MNZ; 3; 6	LEC; 1; 34†	LEC; 2; 5	LEC; 3; 14	MUG; 1 Ret	MUG; 2; 8	MUG; 3; 7	VLL; 1; 4	VLL; 2; 23	VLL; 3; 6	7th	144

=== Complete ADAC Formula 4 Championship results ===
(key) (Races in bold indicate pole position) (Races in italics indicate fastest lap)

Year	Team	1	2	3	4	5	6	7	8	9	10	11	12	13	14	15	16	17	18	Pos	Points
2022	US Racing	SPA; 1	SPA; 2	SPA; 3	HOC; 1	HOC; 2	HOC; 3	ZAN; 1; 6	ZAN; 2; 8	ZAN; 3; 5	NÜR1; 1	NÜR1; 2	NÜR1; 3	LAU; 1	LAU; 2	LAU; 3	NÜR2; 1	NÜR2; 2	NÜR2; 3	15th	22

=== Complete Formula 4 UAE Championship results ===
(key) (Races in bold indicate pole position) (Races in italics indicate fastest lap)

Year	Team	1	2	3	4	5	6	7	8	9	10	11	12	13	14	15	Pos	Points
2023	R-ace GP	DUB1; 1; 33	DUB1; 2; 8	DUB1; 3; 10	KMT1; 1; 33	KMT1; 2; 5	KMT1; 3; 1	KMT2; 1 Ret	KMT2; 2; 26	KMT2; 3; 3	DUB2; 1; 8	DUB2; 2; 11	DUB2; 3; 33	YMC; 1 Ret	YMC; 2; 24	YMC; 3 Ret	8th	59

=== Complete Formula Winter Series results ===
(key) (Races in bold indicate pole position; races in italics indicate fastest lap)

Year	Team	1	2	3	4	5	6	7	8	DC	Points
2023	US Racing	JER; 1	JER; 2	CRT; 1	CRT; 2	NAV; 1	NAV; 2	CAT; 1; 1	**CAT**; **2**; 1	5th	53

=== Complete Euro 4 Championship results ===
(key) (Races in bold indicate pole position; races in italics indicate fastest lap)

Year	Team	1	2	3	4	5	6	7	8	9	DC	Points
2023	US Racing	MUG; 1; 7	MUG; 2; 5	MUG; 3; 22	MNZ; 1 Ret	MNZ; 2; 21	MNZ; 3; 4	CAT; 1; 8	CAT; 2; 5	CAT; 3; 5	7th	76

=== Complete Formula Regional Middle East Championship results ===
(key) (Races in bold indicate pole position) (Races in italics indicate fastest lap)

Year	Entrant	1	2	3	4	5	6	7	8	9	10	11	12	13	14	15	DC	Points
2024	R-ace GP	YMC1; 1; 8	YMC1; 2; 2	YMC1; 3; 10	YMC2; 1; 6	YMC2; 2 Ret	YMC2; 3; 10	DUB1; 1; 11	DUB1; 2; 15	DUB1; 3 Ret	YMC3; 1; 4	YMC3; 2; 3	YMC3; 3; 3	DUB2; 1; 2	DUB2; 2; 6	DUB2; 3; 4	4th	112

=== Complete Formula Regional European Championship results ===
(key) (Races in bold indicate pole position) (Races in italics indicate fastest lap)

Year	Team	1	2	3	4	5	6	7	8	9	10	11	12	13	14	15	16	17	18	19	20	DC	Points
2024	R-ace GP	HOC; 1 Ret	HOC; 2; 16	SPA; 1; 3	SPA; 2; 12	ZAN; 1; 8	ZAN; 2; 18	HUN; 1; 8	HUN; 2; 12	MUG; 1; 12	MUG; 2; 6	LEC; 1; 16	LEC; 2; 7	IMO; 1; 27	IMO; 2; 4	RBR; 1 Ret	RBR; 2; 9	CAT; 1; 21	CAT; 2; 13	MNZ; 1; 14	MNZ; 2; 8	14th	55
2025	CL Motorsport	MIS; 1	MIS; 2	SPA; 1	SPA; 2	ZAN; 1	ZAN; 2	HUN; 1; 17	HUN; 2; 16	LEC; 1; 18	LEC; 2; 15	IMO; 1 Ret	IMO; 2; 14	RBR; 1	RBR; 2	CAT; 1	CAT; 2	HOC; 1	HOC; 2	MNZ; 1	MNZ; 2	26th	0

=== Complete Super Formula Lights results ===
(key) (Races in bold indicate pole position) (Races in italics indicate fastest lap)

Year	Entrant	1	2	3	4	5	6	7	8	9	10	11	12	13	14	15	16	17	18	Pos	Points
2025	B-Max Racing Team	SUZ; 1; 4	SUZ; 2; 8	SUZ; 3; 4	AUT; 1; 5	AUT; 2; 10	OKA; 1; 3	OKA; 2; 6	OKA; 3; 4	SUG; 1; 4	SUG; 2 Ret	SUG; 3; 5	SUG; 4; 8	FUJ; 1; 6	FUJ; 2; 7	FUJ; 3; 5	MOT; 1; 9	MOT; 2 Ret	MOT; 3 DNS	8th	25

^{*} Season still in progress.
