= Kacper Sztuka =

Polish racing driver (born 2006)

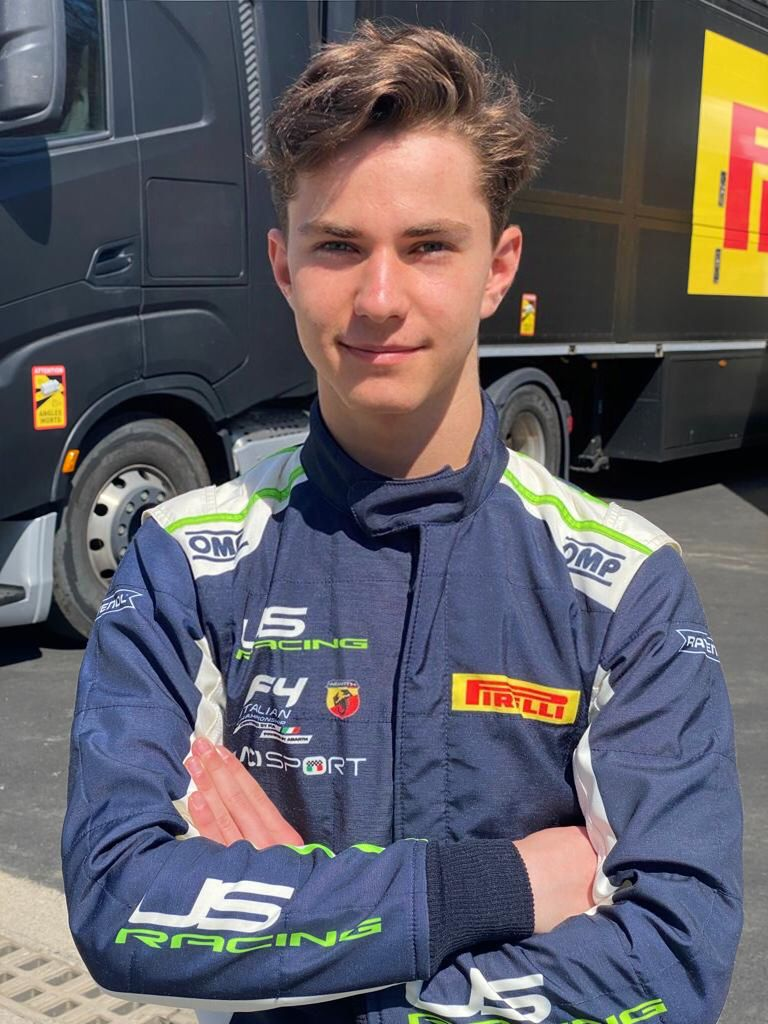
- Sztuka in 2022
- Nationality: (Poland) Polish
- Born: Kacper Mikołaj Sztuka; 28 January 2006 (age 20) Bielsko-Biała, Poland

Eurocup-3 career
- Debut season: 2025
- Current team: Tecnicar by Amtog
- Car number: 2
- Former teams: Griffin Core by Campos
- Starts: 37
- Wins: 2
- Podiums: 9
- Poles: 4
- Fastest laps: 4
- Best finish: 3rd in 2025

Previous series
- 2025; 2025–2026; 2024; 2023; 2023; 2021–2023; 2022; 2021: FR European; Eurocup-3 Spanish Winter; FIA Formula 3; Formula Winter Series; Euro 4; Italian F4; ADAC F4; FIA CEZ F4

Championship titles
- 2023; 2023: Italian F4; Formula Winter Series

Kacper Mikołaj Sztuka (Polish pronunciation: [ˈkat͡spɛr ˈʂtuka]; born 28 January 2006) is a Polish racing driver who last competed in Eurocup-3 for Tecnicar by Amtog.

Born in Bielsko-Biała, Sztuka was the champion of the 2023 Italian F4 Championship with US Racing, and also the winner of the inaugural edition of the Formula Winter Series. A member of the Red Bull Junior Team from 2023 to 2024, he competed in the 2024 FIA Formula 3 Championship with MP Motorsport. He moved down to Eurocup-3 for 2025, finishing third.

== Career ==
=== Karting ===
Sztuka began karting at the age of four in Tychy and subsequently in Wodzisław Śląski where he started practicing at an open-air karting circuit. He made his racing debut in the Czech Republic and began regularly taking part in races in Italy at the age of nine.

=== Formula 4 ===
In 2019, Sztuka became a test driver in Formula 4 for the first time. In 2020, he took part in only four karting races as the rest of the season was cancelled due to the ongoing COVID-19 pandemic, which prompted him to focus on preparations for his debut season in Formula 4.

==== 2021 ====
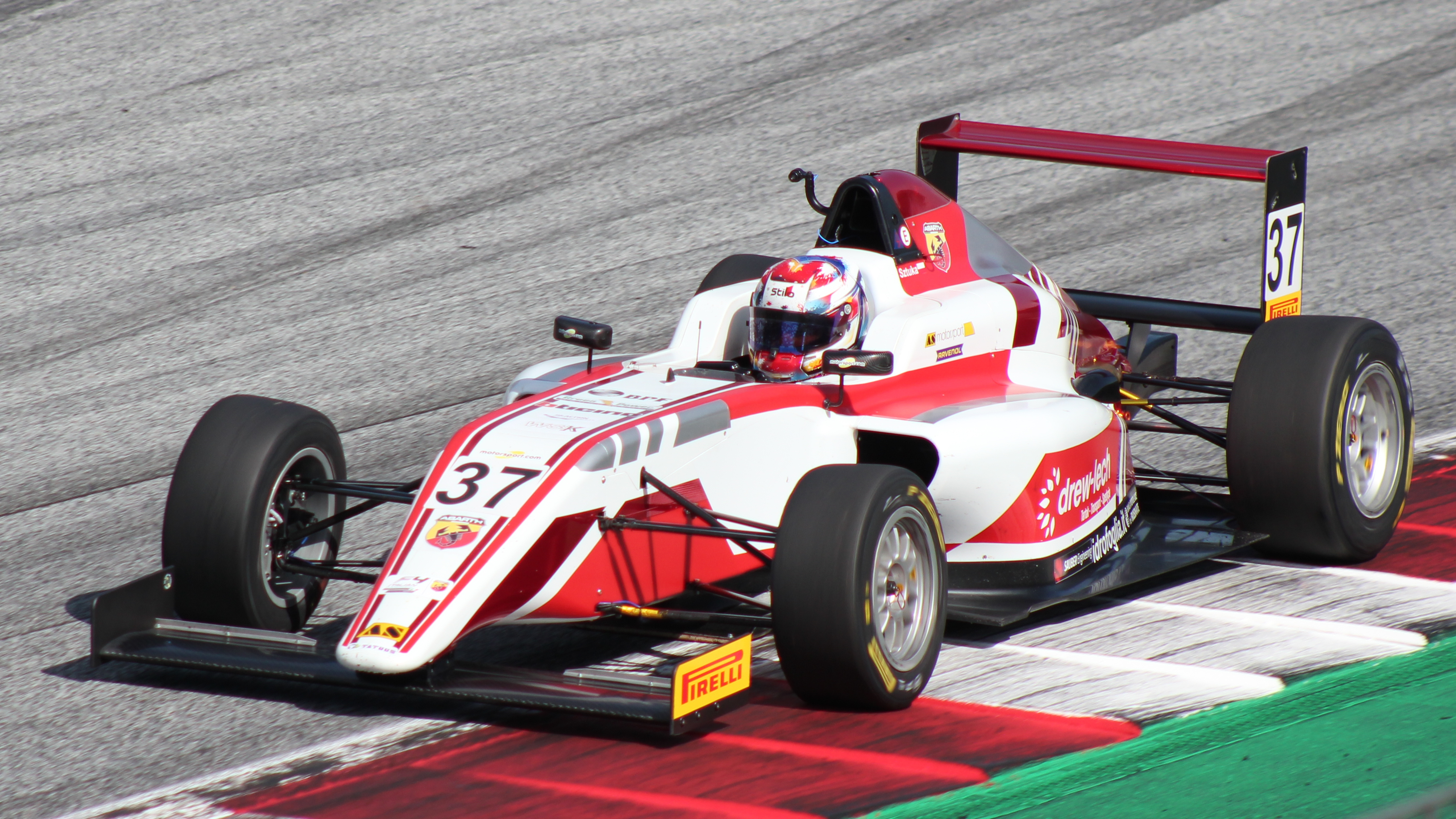
Sztuka driving for AS Motorsport in the 2021 Italian F4 Championship

On 16 May 2021, Sztuka made his debut in the Italian F4 Championship at the Circuit Paul Ricard becoming the youngest Polish racing driver in Formula 4 history. He ended the 2021 season claiming 8th place in the Rookie category.

==== 2022 ====
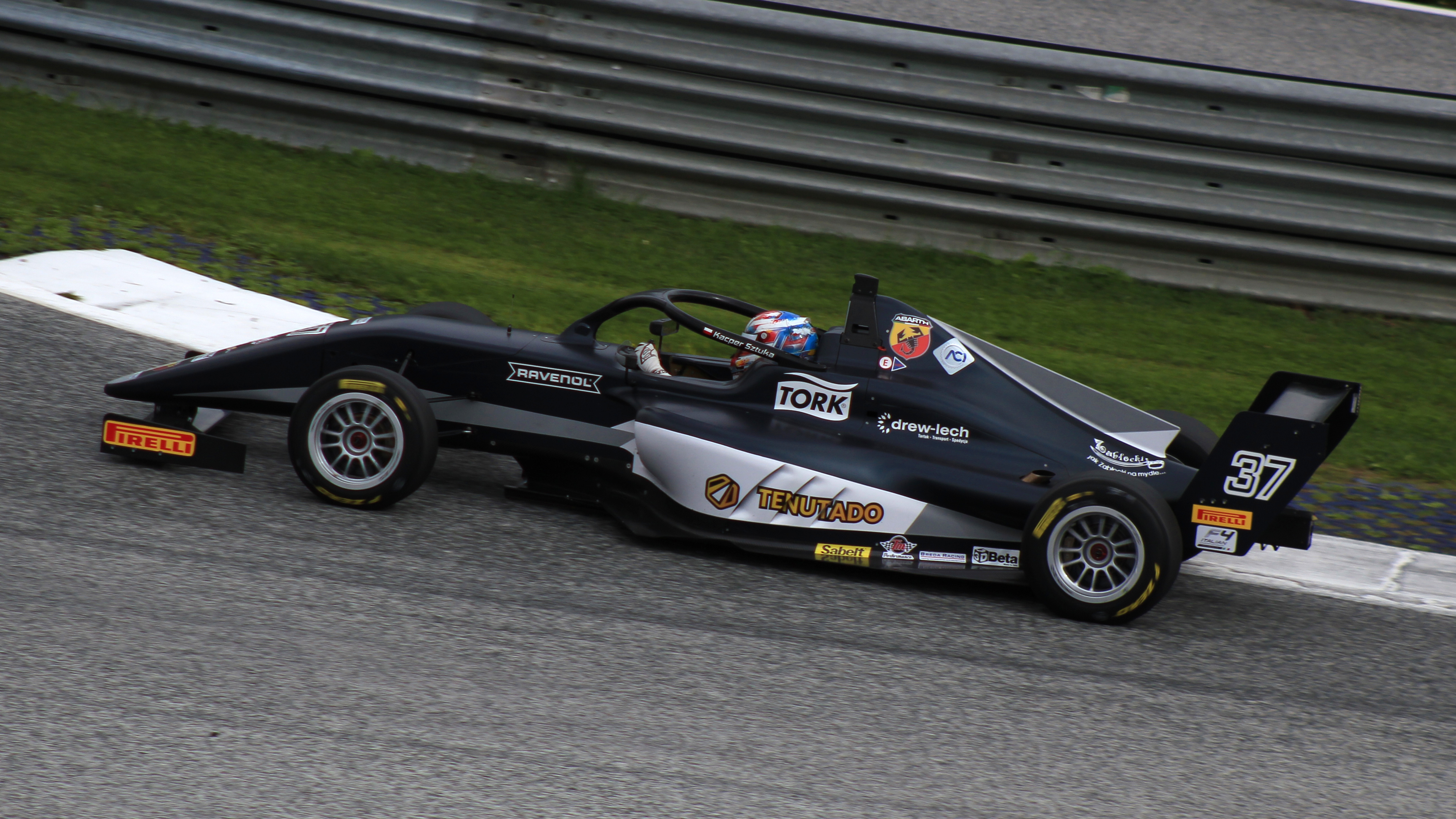
Sztuka representing US Racing in the 2022 Italian F4 Championship

In 2022, Sztuka signed a contract with US Racing, owned by Ralf Schumacher and Gerhard Ungar. He finished four races on the podium including two wins and collected 162 points, which allowed him to finish sixth in the general classification. He also made a guest appearance in the German Formula Four Championship finishing second two times in five races collecting 64 points and claiming tenth place overall.

==== 2023 ====
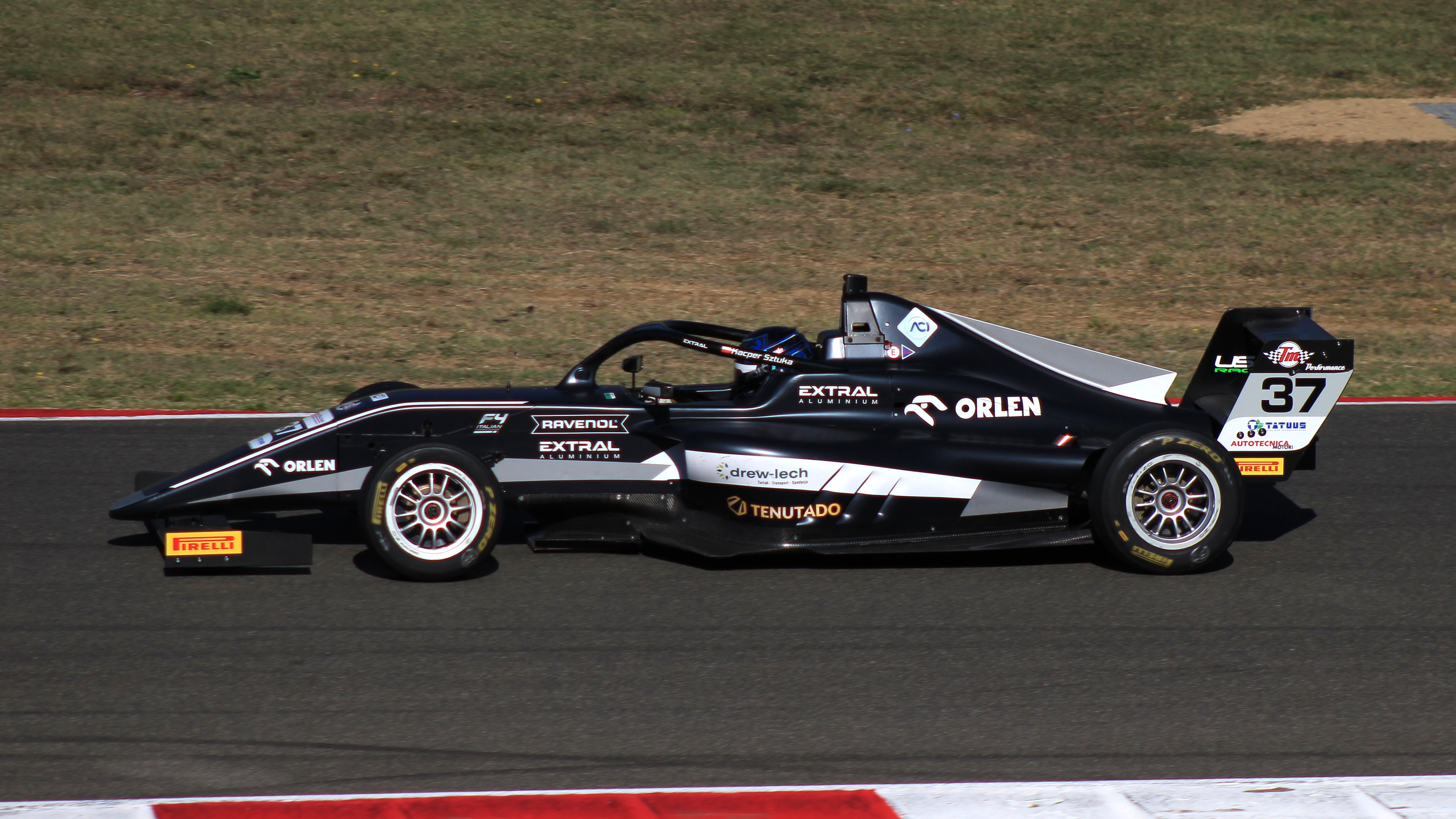
Sztuka racing in the 2023 Italian F4 Championship during the Mugello Circuit

In 2023, Sztuka continued racing in the Italian F4 Championship, again with US Racing. He took his maiden win in the opening race at Imola. With eight wins in the final nine races, he won the championship with a 35-point gap to Ugo Ugochukwu.

In the pre-season, Sztuka also participated in the inaugural edition of the Formula Winter Series. He won five out of first six races, as well as taking four pole positions and four fastest laps, which allowed him to win the championship without having to take part in the last fourth round. It was the first title in his career.

In April 2023, Sztuka received sponsorship support from PKN Orlen by joining the Akademia ORLEN Team.

=== FIA Formula 3 Championship ===
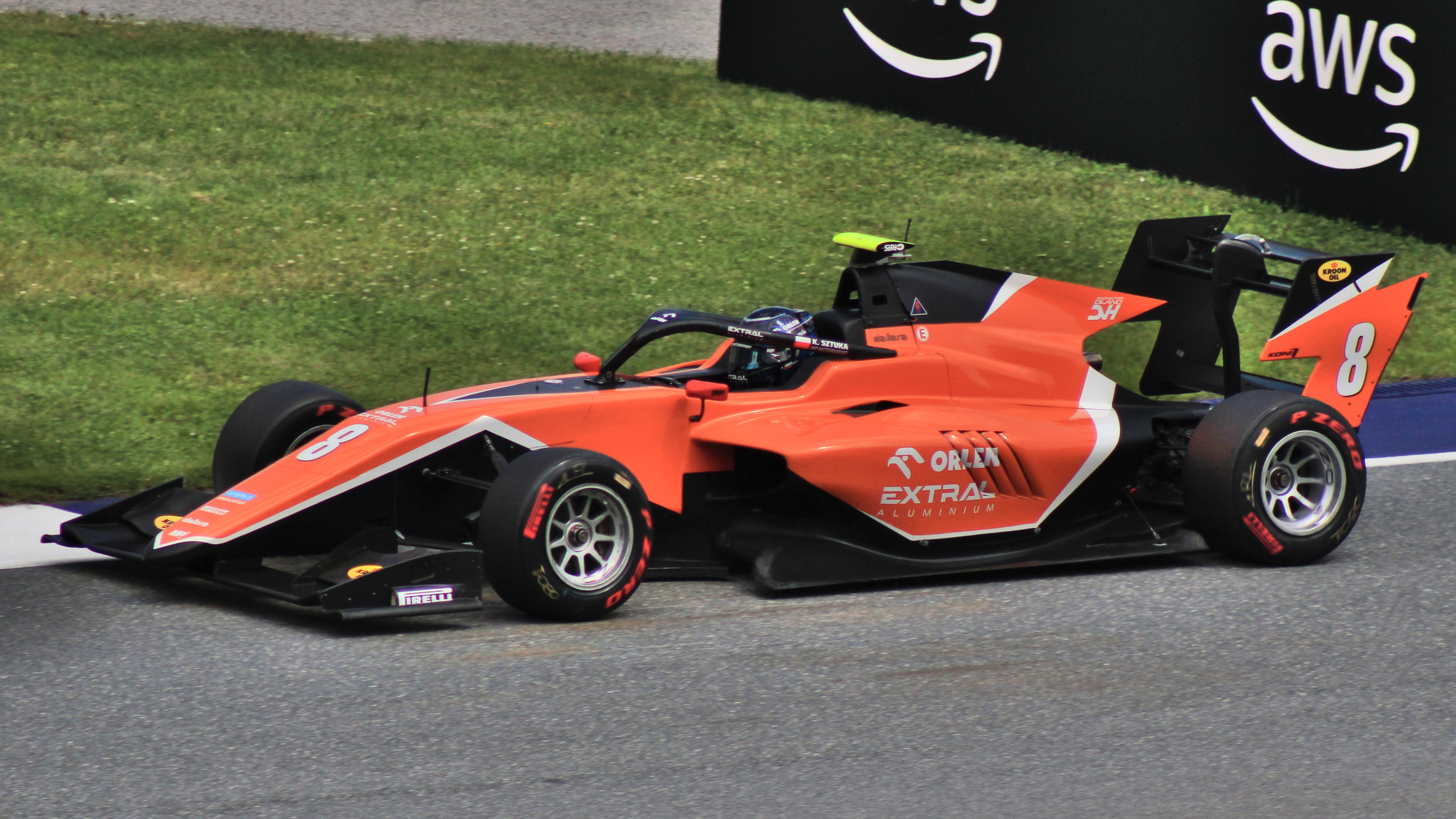
Sztuka driving the Dallara F3 2019 during the 2024 Spielberg Formula 3 round

In November 2023, Sztuka drove for MP Motorsport during the FIA Formula 3 post-season test in Imola In January 2024, he announced that he had signed with the Dutch-based team to compete in the 2024 FIA Formula 3 Championship. However, he struggled during the season, only claiming a single points finish in the Imola sprint race, and finished the season in 27th overall.

Sztuka left the series after a spending a season in the category. Speaking about his time in F3, Sztuka stated: "If I could turn the time back, I would go [sic] to FRECA.” after winning the Italian F4 title.

=== Formula Regional ===
Sztuka joined G4 Racing to race in the opening round of the 2025 Formula Regional European Championship in Misano. He returned to the championship with the team during the sixth round in Imola. He then joined RPM for the penultimate round in Hockenheim.

=== Eurocup-3 ===
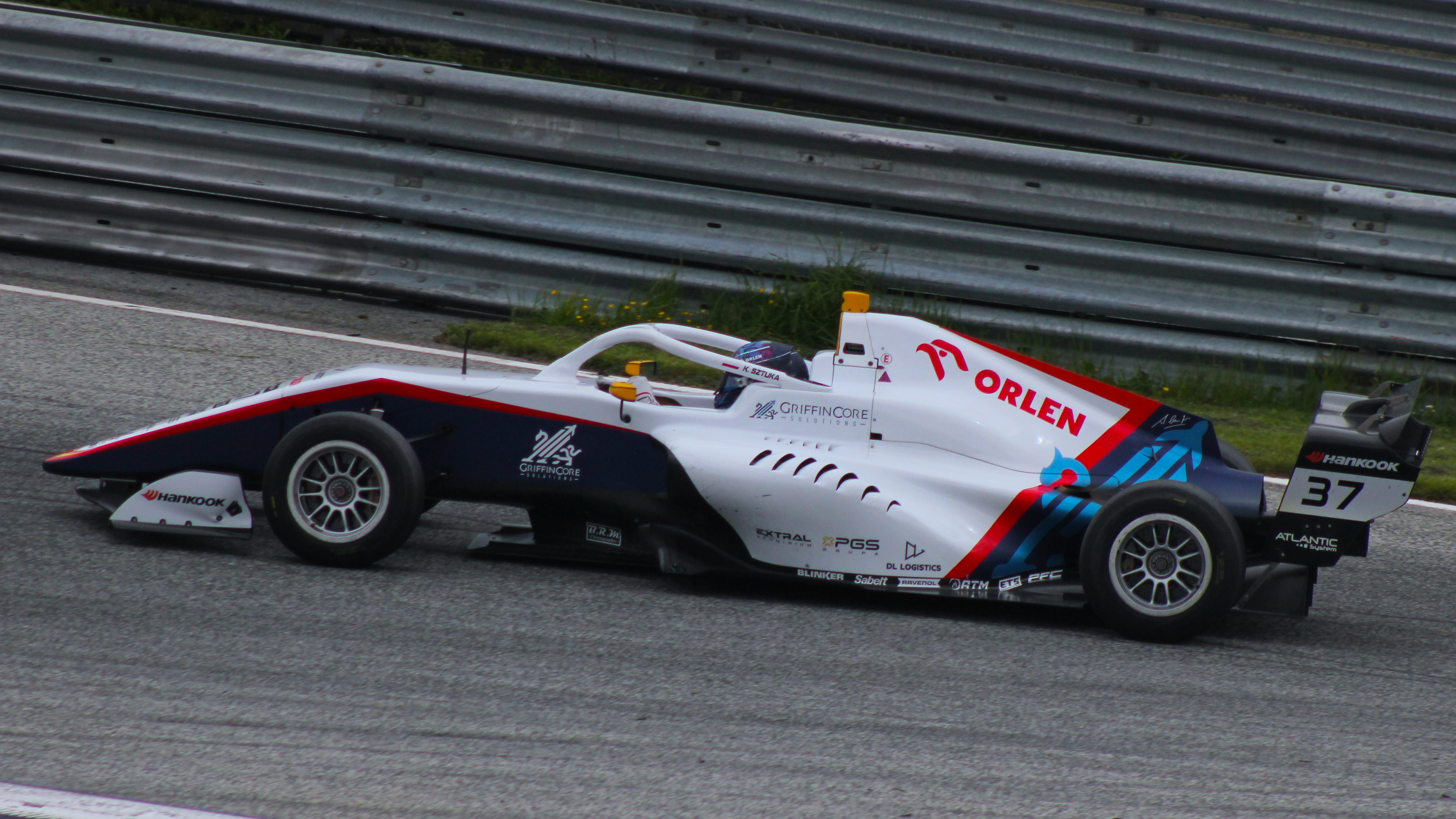
Sztuka driving at the Red Bull Ring during the 2025 Eurocup-3 season

For 2025, Sztuka moved down to Eurocup-3, signing for Campos Racing. He also drove for the same team in the first two rounds of the Eurocup-3 Spanish Winter Championship. He finished 11th in the standings with 27 points, his best result being a third place in the third race in Portimão.

=== Formula One ===
In November 2023, it was announced that Sztuka would join the Red Bull Junior Team. However, just seven months later, it was announced that Sztuka would be leaving after his contract was terminated by Red Bull.

== Personal life ==
Sztuka was born in Bielsko-Biała in 2006. His father is a Polish rally driver Łukasz Sztuka. He attended the General Antoni Osuchowski High School No. 1 in Cieszyn. He named Kimi Raikkonen and Robert Kubica as his childhood idols who inspire him. He is the winner of Dziennik Zachodni's Greatest Sporting Talent of the Silesian Voivodeship Award.

== Karting record ==
=== Karting career summary ===
Season	Series	Team	Position
2011	Czech Championship — Easy 50	Hawi Racing Team	NC
2012	Moravsky Pohar — Mladi 50		
2012	Czech Championship — Easy 50	Hawi Racing Team	8th
2013	Karting Cup — 60 Baby		1st
2013	Open Cup — Baby		2nd
2013	Moravsky Pohar — 60 Baby		
2014	Moravsky Pohar — 60 Baby		1st
2014	Karting Cup — 60 Baby		1st
2014	Pohar Autoklubu Ceske Republiky — 60 Baby	Feber Racing	3rd
2015	South Garda Winter Cup — Mini ROK		21st
2015	WSK Gold Cup — 60 Mini		22nd
2015	WSK Super Master Series — 60 Mini	RB Racing	NC
2015	WSK Final Cup — 60 Mini	Sztuka, Lukasz	NC
2016	WSK Champions Cup — 60 Mini	RB Racing	NC
2016	ROK Cup Italy Area Nord — Mini ROK		77th
2017	WSK Champions Cup — 60 Mini	TBKart Srl	NC
2017	WSK Super Master Series — 60 Mini	TBKart Srl	NC
2017	Italian Championship — 60 Mini	TBKart Srl	34th
2017	WSK Final Cup — 60 Mini	Parolin Racing Team	27th
2018	WSK Super Master Series — 60 Mini	AV Racing	NC
2018	Italian Championship — ROK Junior		16th
2018	WSK Final Cup — OKJ	Speedkart	NC
2019	WSK Super Master Series — OKJ	Speedkart	NC
2019	WSK Euro Series — OKJ	Speedkart	NC
2019	CIK-FIA European Championship — OKJ	Speedkart	NC
2019	WSK Open Cup — OKJ	Speedkart	22nd
2019	WSK Final Cup — OKJ	Speedkart	11th
2019	German Championship — Junior	Ward Racing	NC
2019	Copa Campeones — OKJ	Ward Racing	2nd
2020	WSK Champions Cup — OKJ	Ward Racing	26th
2020	WSK Super Master Series — OKJ	Ward Racing	35th

== Racing record ==
=== Racing career summary ===
Season	Series	Team	Races	Wins	Poles	F/Laps	Podiums	Points	Position
2021	Italian F4 Championship	AS Motorsport	18	0	0	0	0	0	36th
2021	Italian F4 Championship	Iron Lynx	3	0	0	0	0	0	36th
2021	FIA Central European Zone Formula 4	AS Motorsport	2	0	?	?	0	4	14th
2022	Italian F4 Championship	US Racing	20	2	0	0	4	162	6th
2022	ADAC Formula 4 Championship	US Racing	5	0	0	0	2	64	10th
2023	Formula Winter Series	US Racing	6	5	4	4	6	151	**1st**
2023	Italian F4 Championship	US Racing	21	9	9	8	12	315	**1st**
2023	Euro 4 Championship	US Racing	6	2	3	2	4	74.5	8th
2024	FIA Formula 3 Championship	MP Motorsport	20	0	0	0	0	6	27th
2025	Eurocup-3 Spanish Winter Championship	Campos Racing	6	0	0	1	1	27	10th
2025	Eurocup-3	Griffin Core by Campos	18	2	4	4	7	200	**3rd**
2025	Formula Regional European Championship	G4 Racing	4	0	0	0	0	0	24th
2025	Formula Regional European Championship	RPM	2	0	0	0	0	0	24th
2026	Eurocup-3 Spanish Winter Championship	Tecnicar by Amtog	9	0	0	0	0	0	23rd
2026	Eurocup-3	Tecnicar by Amtog	19	0	0	0	2	85	6th

^{*} Season still in progress.

=== Complete Italian F4 Championship results ===
(key) (Races in bold indicate pole position) (Races in italics indicate fastest lap)

Year	Team	1	2	3	4	5	6	7	8	9	10	11	12	13	14	15	16	17	18	19	20	21	22	DC	Points
2021	AS Motorsport	LEC; 1; 23	LEC; 2; 13	LEC; 3; 19	MIS; 1; 23	MIS; 2; 13	MIS; 3; 11	VLL; 1; 23	VLL; 2; 17	VLL; 3; 20	IMO; 1; 14	IMO; 2; 12	IMO; 3 Ret	RBR; 1; 18	RBR; 2; 18	RBR; 3; 19				MNZ; 1; 17	MNZ; 2; 16	MNZ; 3; 30		36th	0
2021	Iron Lynx																MUG; 1; 17	MUG; 2; 22	MUG; 3; 18					36th	0
2022	US Racing	IMO; 1 Ret	IMO; 2; 2	IMO; 3; 1	MIS; 1 Ret	MIS; 2; 10	MIS; 3; 4	SPA; 1 Ret	SPA; 2; 12	SPA; 3; 6	VLL; 1; 7	VLL; 2; 5	VLL; 3; 6	RBR; 1	RBR; 2; 4	RBR; 3; 1	RBR; 4; 5	MNZ; 1; 3	MNZ; 2 Ret	MNZ; 3 C	MUG; 1 Ret	MUG; 2; 4	MUG; 3 Ret	6th	162
2023	US Racing	**IMO**; **1**; 1	IMO; 2 Ret	IMO; 3	IMO; 4 Ret	MIS; 1; 4	MIS; 2 Ret	MIS; 3; 4	SPA; 1; 6	SPA; 2; 2	**SPA**; **3**; 24	MNZ; 1; 4	MNZ; 2; 4	MNZ; 3; 2	LEC; 1; 1	**LEC**; **2**; 1	LEC; 3; 1	**MUG**; **1**; 1	**MUG**; **2**; 1	**MUG**; **3**; 1	**VLL**; **1**; 3	**VLL**; **2**; 1	**VLL**; **3**; 1	1st	315

=== Complete ADAC F4 Championship results ===
(key) (Races in bold indicate pole position) (Races in italics indicate fastest lap)

Year	Team	1	2	3	4	5	6	7	8	9	10	11	12	13	14	15	16	17	18	DC	Points
2022	US Racing	SPA; 1 DNS	SPA; 2; 4	SPA; 3; 2	HOC; 1	HOC; 2	HOC; 3	ZAN; 1	ZAN; 2	ZAN; 3	NÜR1; 1	NÜR1; 2	NÜR1; 3	LAU; 1; 4	LAU; 2; 2	LAU; 3; 8	NÜR2; 1	NÜR2; 2	NÜR2; 3	10th	64

=== Complete Formula Winter Series results ===
(key) (Races in bold indicate pole position; races in italics indicate fastest lap)

Year	Team	1	2	3	4	5	6	7	8	DC	Points
2023	US Racing	**JER**; **1**; 1	**JER**; **2**; 1	CRT; 1; 2	CRT; 2; 1	**NAV**; **1**; 1	**NAV**; **2**; 1	CAT; 1	CAT; 2	1st	151

=== Complete Euro 4 Championship results ===
(key) (Races in bold indicate pole position; races in italics indicate fastest lap)

Year	Team	1	2	3	4	5	6	7	8	9	DC	Points
2023	US Racing	**MUG**; **1**; 2	MUG; 2; 8	MUG; 3; 3	MNZ; 1; 1	**MNZ**; **2**; 1	**MNZ**; **3** Ret	CAT; 1	CAT; 2	CAT; 3	8th	74.5

=== Complete FIA Formula 3 Championship results ===
(key) (Races in bold indicate pole position) (Races in italics indicate fastest lap)

Year	Entrant	1	2	3	4	5	6	7	8	9	10	11	12	13	14	15	16	17	18	19	20	DC	Points
2024	MP Motorsport	BHR; SPR; 20	BHR; FEA; 28	MEL; SPR; 16	MEL; FEA; 18	IMO; SPR; 5	IMO; FEA; 15	MON; SPR; Ret	MON; FEA; 11	CAT; SPR; 23	CAT; FEA; 28	RBR; SPR; Ret	RBR; FEA; 16	SIL; SPR; Ret	SIL; FEA; 17	HUN; SPR; 27	HUN; FEA; 18	SPA; SPR; 20	SPA; FEA; 18	MNZ; SPR; 18	MNZ; FEA; 12	27th	6

=== Complete Eurocup-3 Spanish Winter Championship results ===
(key) (Races in bold indicate pole position) (Races in italics indicate fastest lap)

Year	Team	1	2	3	4	5	6	7	8	9	DC	Points
2025	Griffin Core by Campos	JER; 1; 9	JER; 2; 5	JER; 3; 10	POR; 1; 11	POR; 2 Ret	POR; 3; 3	ARA; 1	ARA; 2		11th	27
2026	Tecnicar by Amtog	POR; 1; 13	POR; 2; 20	POR; 3; 24†	JAR; 1; 12	JAR; 2; 20	JAR; 3; 24†	ARA; 1; 25	ARA; 2; 18	ARA; 3 Ret	23rd	0

=== Complete Formula Regional European Championship results ===
(key) (Races in bold indicate pole position) (Races in italics indicate fastest lap)

Year	Team	1	2	3	4	5	6	7	8	9	10	11	12	13	14	15	16	17	18	19	20	DC	Points
2025	G4 Racing	MIS; 1; 18	MIS; 2; 13	SPA; 1	SPA; 2	ZAN; 1	ZAN; 2	HUN; 1	HUN; 2	LEC; 1	LEC; 2	IMO; 1; 13	IMO; 2; 21	RBR; 1	RBR; 2	CAT; 1	CAT; 2					24th	0
2025	RPM																	HOC; 1; 21	HOC; 2; 16	MNZ; 1	MNZ; 2	24th	0

=== Complete Eurocup-3 results ===
(key) (Races in bold indicate pole position) (Races in italics indicate fastest lap)

Year	Team	1	2	3	4	5	6	7	8	9	10	11	12	13	14	15	16	17	18	19	DC	Points
2025	Griffin Core by Campos	RBR; 1; 2	RBR; 2; 5	**POR**; **1**; 3	POR; SR; 25	POR; 2; 3	LEC; 1; 3	LEC; SR; 10	**LEC**; **2**; 1	MNZ; 1 Ret	MNZ; 2; 9	ASS; 1; 5	ASS; 2; 4	SPA; 1; 4	SPA; 2 Ret	**JER**; **1**; 14	JER; 2; 2	**CAT**; **1**; 1	CAT; 2; 4		3rd	200
2026	Tecnicar by Amtog	LEC; 1; 12	LEC; SR; 12	LEC; 2; 7	POR; 1; 5	POR; 2 Ret	IMO; 1; 5	IMO; SR; 5	IMO; 2; 3	MNZ; 1 Ret	MNZ; 2; 3	SIL; 1; 7	SIL; 2; 17	JER; 1; 11	JER; SPR; 11	JER; 2 Ret	HUN; 1; 6	HUN; 2; 6	CAT; 1; 27	CAT; 2; 10	6th	85

== See also ==
- Sport in Poland

Sporting positions
Preceded by Andrea Kimi Antonelli	Italian F4 Championship; Champion; 2023	Succeeded by Freddie Slater
Preceded by Established	Formula Winter Series; Champion; 2023	Succeeded by Griffin Peebles
