= Nicola Lacorte =

Italian racing driver (born 2007)

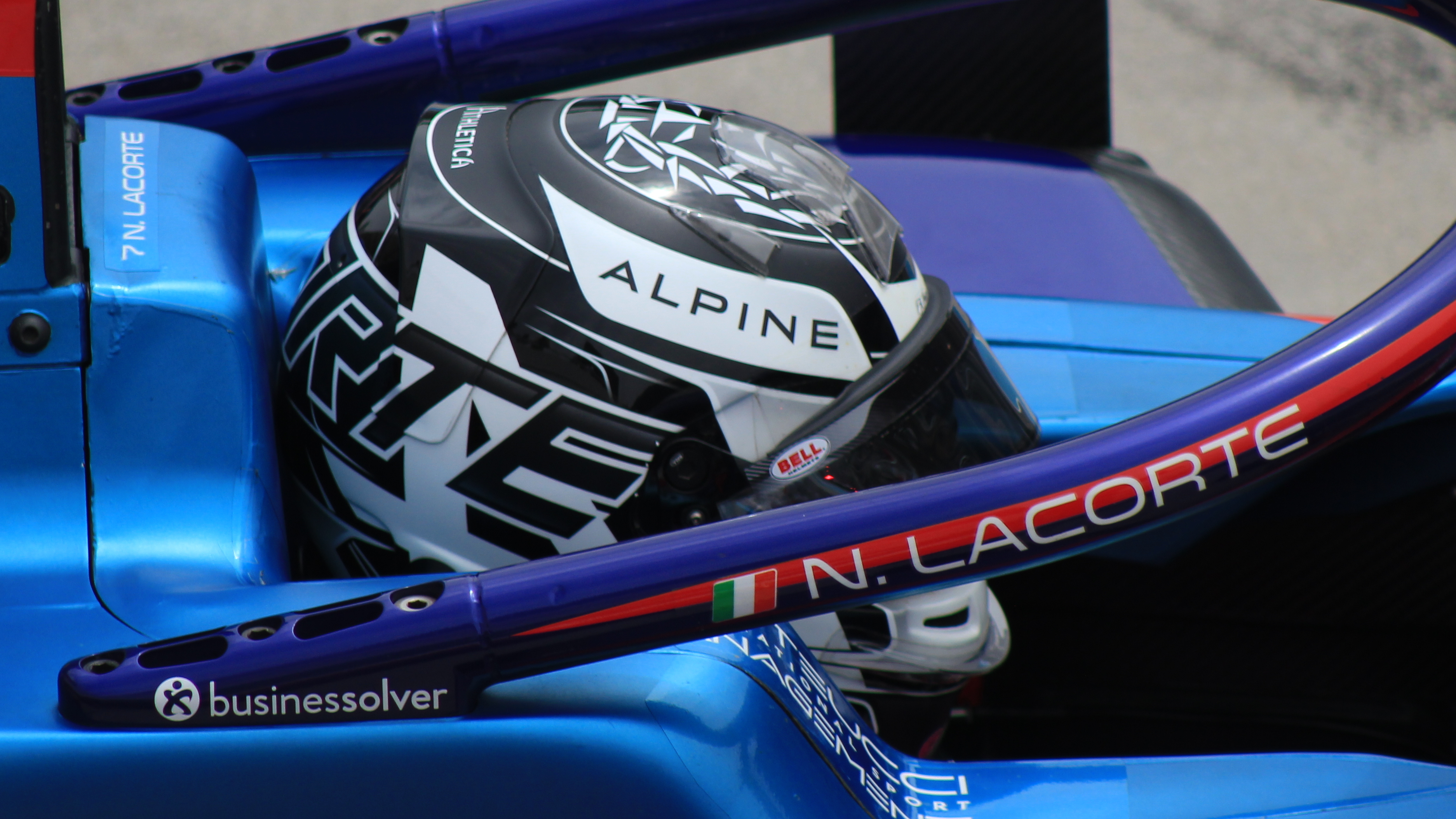
- Lacorte in 2024
- Nationality: (Italy) Italian
- Born: 1 June 2007 (age 19) Pisa, Italy
- Relatives: Roberto Lacorte (father)

FIA Formula 3 Championship career
- Debut season: 2025
- Current team: DAMS Lucas Oil
- Categorisation: FIA Silver
- Car number: 29
- Starts: 36
- Wins: 1
- Podiums: 1
- Poles: 0
- Fastest laps: 1
- Best finish: 19th in 2026

Previous series
- 2025; 2024; 2024; 2023; 2023; 2022–2023: IMSA SportsCar Championship; FR European; FR Oceania; Euro 4; F4 UAE; Italian F4
- Statistics up to date as of 15 September 2026.

Nicola Lacorte (born 1 June 2007) is an Italian racing driver who competes in the Hypercar class of the Asian Le Mans Series for Cetilar Racing. He previously competed in the FIA Formula 3 Championship for DAMS Lucas Oil. Lacorte is set to compete in the FIA Formula 2 Championship for Prema in 2027.

Lacorte is the son of pharmaceutical entrepreneur and amateur sports car racer Roberto Lacorte, the owner of Cetilar Racing. He is a former member of the Alpine Academy, and a race-winner in the Italian F4 Championship.

== Career ==
=== Karting ===
Lacorte finished 56th in the 2021 FIA Karting European Championship. In July 2022, he contested in a scouting camp conducted by the Ferrari Driver Academy.

=== Formula 4 ===
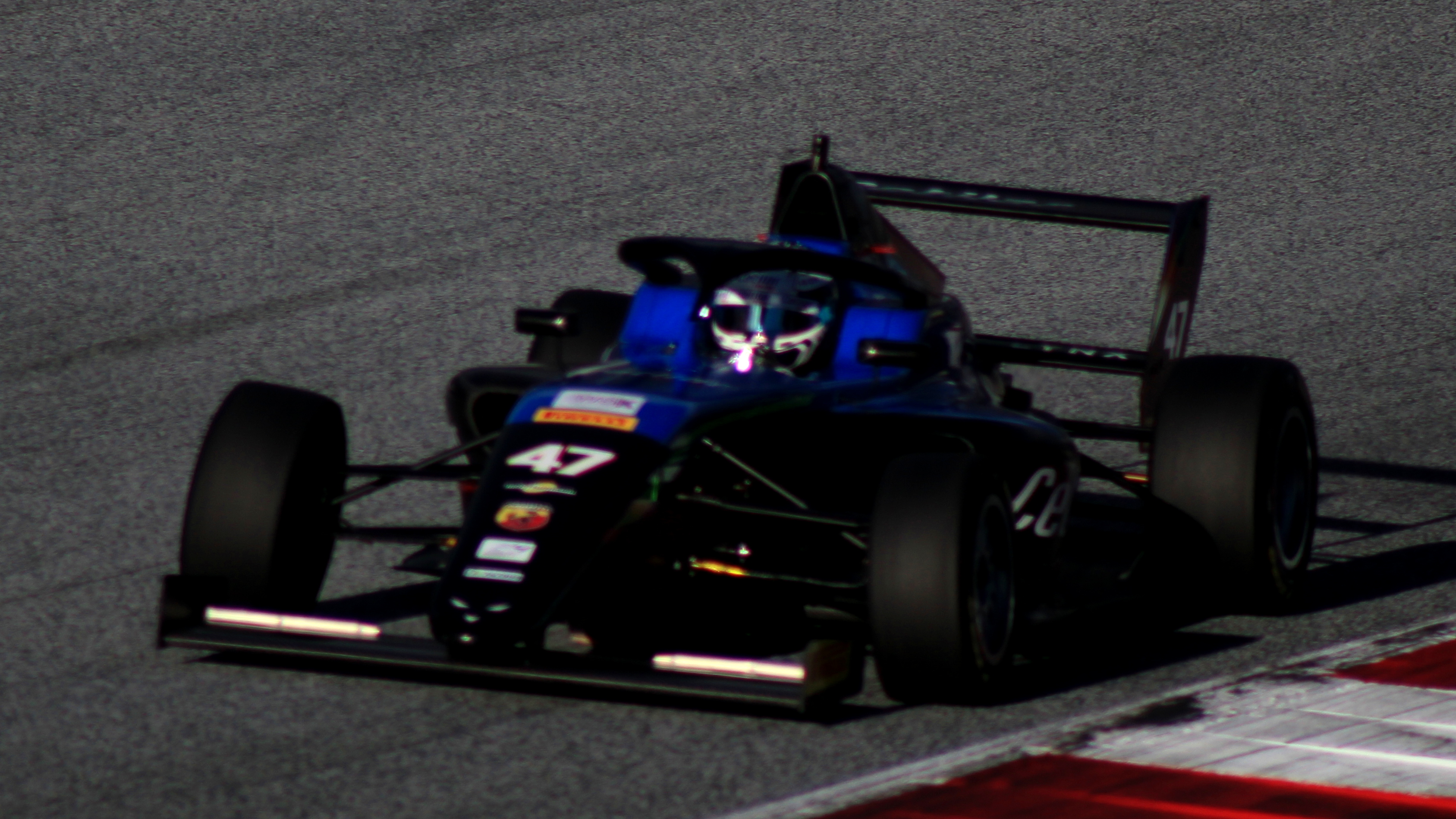
Lacorte racing at the Red Bull Ring during the 2022 Italian F4 Championship.

==== 2022 ====
Lacorte made his single-seater debut at the Red Bull Ring round of the 2022 Italian F4 Championship with Iron Lynx. His only points came in his first race, where he ended 28th in the standings.

==== 2023 ====
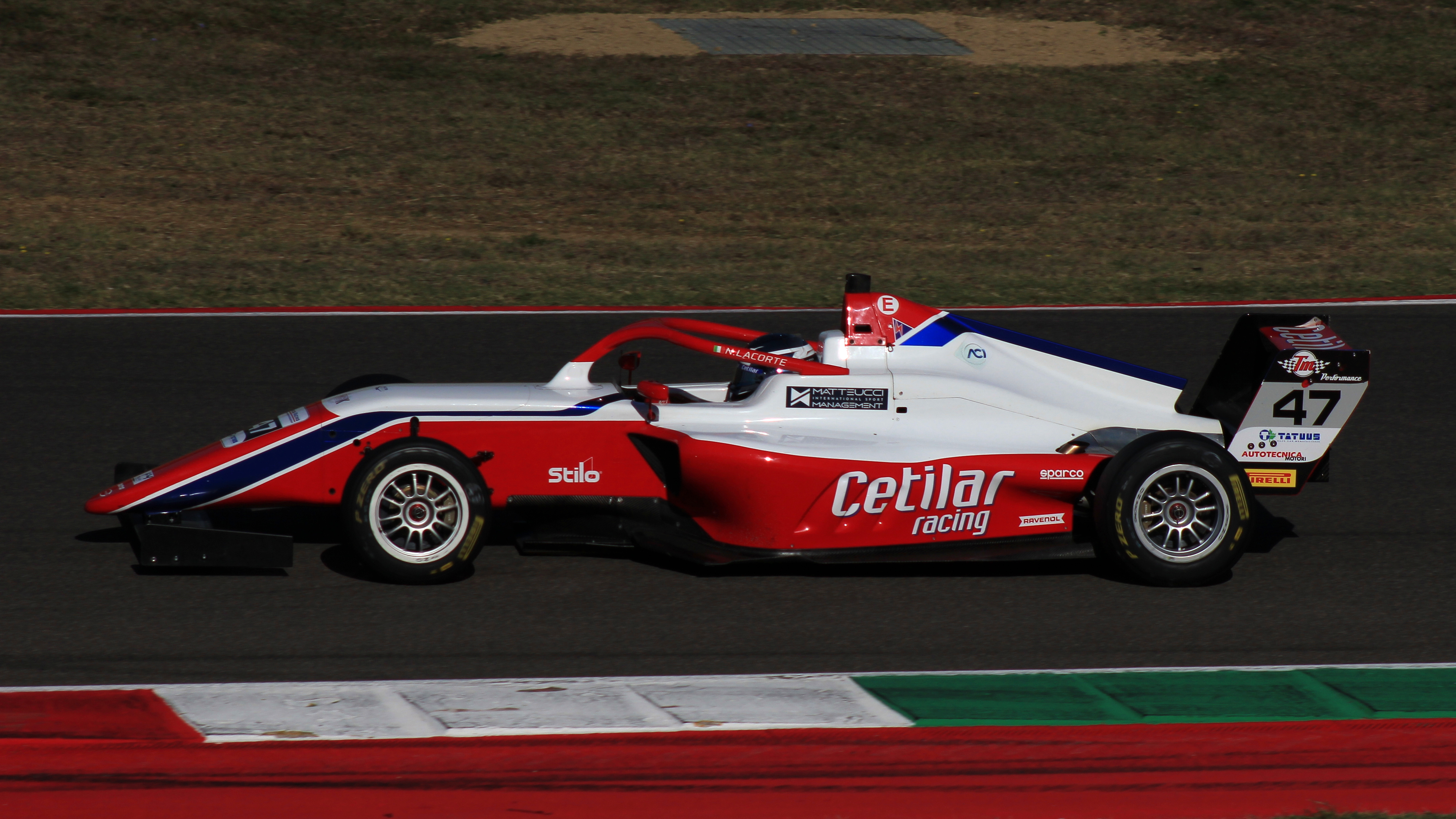
Lacorte driving at the Mugello Circuit during the 2023 Italian F4 Championship.

Lacorte signed with Prema Racing in 2023 to compete in Formula 4 UAE and Italian F4. In the former, he did not have a very successful campaign; he only managed two points finishes and was 24th in the standings with five points. In his main campaign, he started the season well with a third placed podium in the first race in Imola. He proceeded to take his first win during the third race after polesitter and teammate Ugo Ugochukwu was eliminated on the opening lap. However, those were his only podiums of the season, as Lacorte placed ninth in the standings with only seven further points finishes.

=== Formula Regional ===
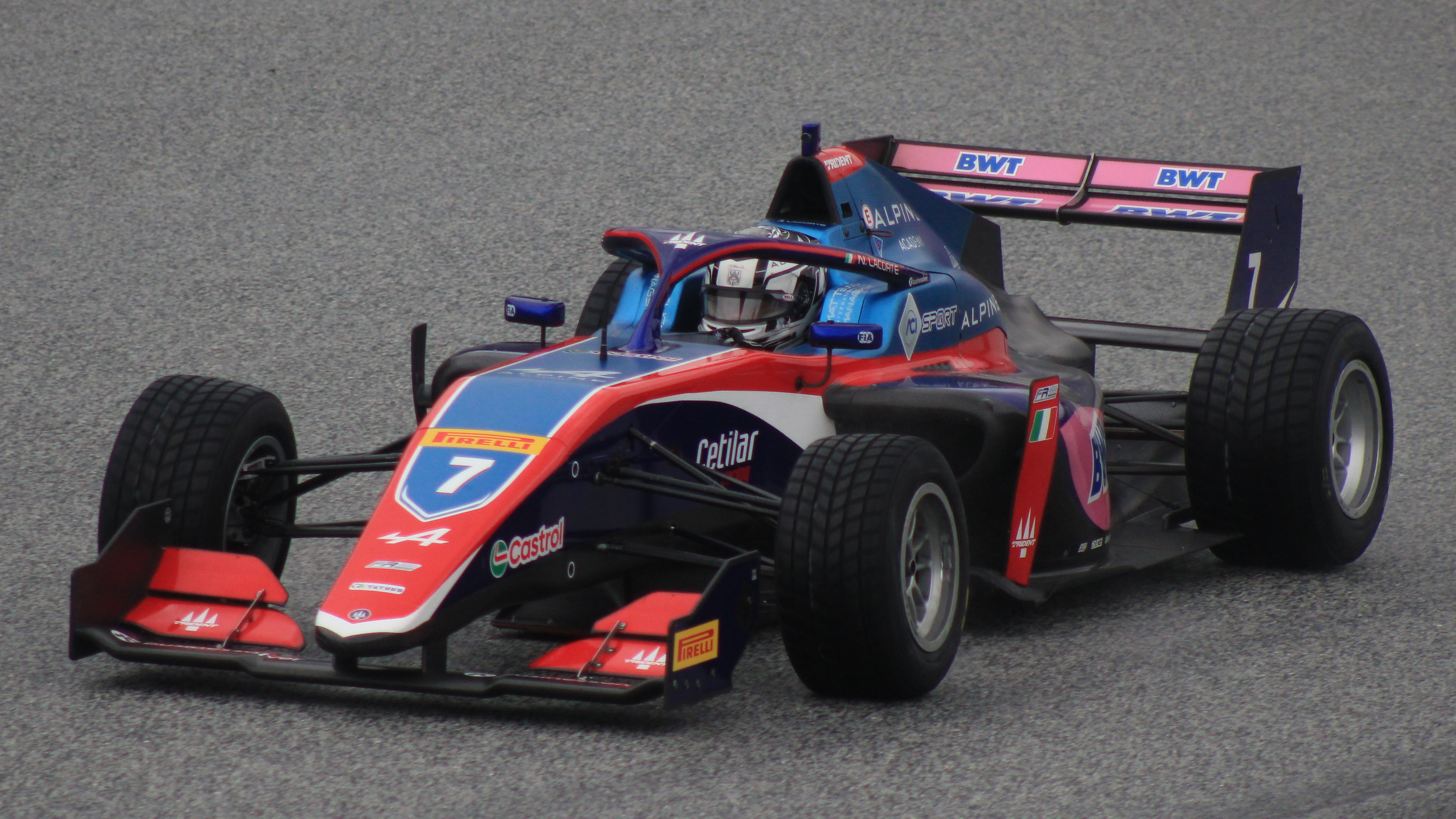
Lacorte driving at the Red Bull Ring during the 2024 Formula Regional European Championship

At the start of 2024, Lacorte participated in the Formula Regional Oceania Championship with M2 Competition. He took part in the first three rounds of the year, and won a race in Hampton Downs Motorsport Park. His main campaign consisted of a full season in the Formula Regional European Championship. Driving for Trident, Lacorte only managed to finish in the points twice on his way to 21st overall.

=== FIA Formula 3 Championship ===
==== 2025 ====
For 2025, Lacorte entered the FIA Formula 3 Championship with new entrants DAMS. The season started slowly, as Lacorte's best result after three rounds was 15th in the Imola sprint race. At the Monaco round, he was disqualified from qualifying after receiving outside assistance to rejoin the track after an off at turn 1, but re-entered the session even after receiving the black flag. He then retired after causing a collision with Santiago Ramos during the sprint race, having pinched Ramos on the inside of turn 7 during the opening lap, which earned Lacorte a grid penalty. His seven penalty points were added to at the next event in Barcelona, where Lacorte began by causing a collision with José Garfias in qualifying, moving into the latter's car in frustration after believing to have been brake-tested. During the feature race, Lacorte caused a collision with Brando Badoer at turn 1, earning himself a 12th penalty point that resulted in him being banned from the following round in Austria. Lacorte also accrued six further penalty points for multiple safety car speeding infractions. He finished the season 33rd in the points standings.

==== 2026 ====
Lacorte remained with DAMS for the 2026 season.

=== FIA Formula 2 Championship ===
Lacorte will move up to Formula 2 in 2027, joining Prema Racing.

=== Formula One ===
Lacorte was a member of the Alpine Academy from 2024 to 2025.

=== Sportscar racing ===
At the start of 2025, Lacorte entered into the 24 Hours of Daytona with Cetliar Racing, driving alongside his father Roberto. Later that year in November, Lacorte joined the FIA World Endurance Championship rookie test at the Bahrain International Circuit, driving the Ferrari 296 GT3 for AF Corse.

== Karting record ==
=== Karting career summary ===
Season	Series	Team	Position
2019	24° South Garda Winter Cup — OKJ	KR Motorsport	NC
2019	WSK Champions Cup — OKJ	KR Motorsport	NC
2019	WSK Super Master Series — OKJ	KR Motorsport	NC
2019	WSK Euro Series — OKJ	KR Motorsport	NC
2019	CIK-FIA World Championship — OKJ	KR Motorsport	NC
2019	FIA Karting European Championship — OKJ	KR Motorsport	NC
2020	WSK Champions Cup — OKJ	KR Motorsport	NC
2020	WSK Super Master Series — OKJ	KR Motorsport	31st
2020	25° South Garda Winter Cup — OKJ	KR Motorsport	NC
2020	WSK Euro Series — OKJ	KR Motorsport	51st
2020	Andrea Margutti Trophy — OKJ	Team Driver Racing Kart	5th
2021	WSK Champions Cup — OK	KR Motorsport	25th
2021	WSK Super Master Series — OK		48th
2021	WSK Euro Series — OK		27th
2021	WSK Open Cup — OK		34th
2021	FIA Karting European Championship — OK		56th

== Racing record ==
=== Racing career summary ===
Season	Series	Team	Races	Wins	Poles	F/Laps	Podiums	Points	Position
2022	Italian F4 Championship	Iron Lynx	8	0	0	0	0	1	28th
2023	Formula 4 UAE Championship	Prema Racing	15	0	0	0	0	5	24th
2023	Italian F4 Championship	Prema Racing	21	1	1	0	2	75	9th
2023	Euro 4 Championship	Prema Racing	9	0	0	0	0	57.5	9th
2024	Formula Regional Oceania Championship	M2 Competition	9	1	0	1	2	130	10th
2024	Formula Regional European Championship	Trident	20	0	0	1	0	3	21st
2025	FIA Formula 3 Championship	DAMS Lucas Oil	17	0	0	0	0	0	33rd
2025	IMSA SportsCar Championship - GTD	Cetilar Racing	2	0	0	0	0	337	58th
2026	FIA Formula 3 Championship	DAMS Lucas Oil	19	1	0	1	1	33	19th
2026	GT World Challenge Europe Endurance Cup	AF Corse							
2026–27	Asian Le Mans Series - Hypercar	Cetilar Racing	2	0	1	0	2	37	**2nd***
2027	FIA Formula 2 Championship	Prema Racing	0	0	0	0	0	0	TBD

* Season still in progress.

=== Complete Italian F4 Championship results ===
(key) (Races in bold indicate pole position) (Races in italics indicate fastest lap)

Year	Entrant	1	2	3	4	5	6	7	8	9	10	11	12	13	14	15	16	17	18	19	20	21	22	Pos	Points
2022	Iron Lynx	IMO; 1	IMO; 2	IMO; 3	MIS; 1	MIS; 2	MIS; 3	SPA; 1	SPA; 2	SPA; 3	VLL; 1	VLL; 2	VLL; 3	RBR; 1; 10	RBR; 2 Ret	RBR; 3	RBR; 4; 26	MNZ; 1 Ret	MNZ; 2; 35†	MNZ; 3 C	MUG; 1; 19	MUG; 2; 12	MUG; 3 Ret	28th	1
2023	Prema Racing	IMO; 1; 3	IMO; 2	IMO; 3; 1	**IMO**; **4**; 4	MIS; 1; 8	MIS; 2; 11	MIS; 3; 8	SPA; 1; 16	SPA; 2; 13‡	SPA; 3; 8	MNZ; 1; 11	MNZ; 2; 7	MNZ; 3; 9	LEC; 1; 32	LEC; 2; 12	LEC; 3; 15	MUG; 1; 29†	MUG; 2; 10	MUG; 3; 17	VLL; 1; 9	VLL; 2; 24	VLL; 3; 12	9th	75

^{†} Driver did not finish the race, but was classified as he completed over 90% of the race distance.
^{‡} Half points awarded as less than 75% of race distance was completed.

=== Complete Formula 4 UAE Championship results ===
(key) (Races in bold indicate pole position) (Races in italics indicate fastest lap)

Year	Entrant	1	2	3	4	5	6	7	8	9	10	11	12	13	14	15	Pos	Points
2023	Prema Racing	DUB1; 1 Ret	DUB1; 2; 15	DUB1; 3; 11	KMT1; 1; 18	KMT1; 2; 23	KMT1; 3; 16	KMT2; 1; 11	KMT2; 2; 18	KMT2; 3; 11	DUB2; 1; 10	DUB2; 2; 12	DUB2; 3; 16	YMC; 1; 29†	YMC; 2 Ret	YMC; 3; 8	24th	5

=== Complete Euro 4 Championship results ===
(key) (Races in bold indicate pole position; races in italics indicate fastest lap)

Year	Entrant	1	2	3	4	5	6	7	8	9	Pos	Points
2023	Prema Racing	MUG; 1; 5	MUG; 2; 24†	MUG; 3; 7	MNZ; 1 Ret	MNZ; 2; 10	MNZ; 3; 10	CAT; 1 Ret	CAT; 2; 4	CAT; 3; 6	9th	57.5

=== Complete Formula Regional Oceania Championship results ===
(key) (Races in bold indicate pole position) (Races in italics indicate fastest lap)

Year	Entrant	1	2	3	4	5	6	7	8	9	10	11	12	13	14	15	Pos	Points
2024	M2 Competition	TAU; 1 Ret	TAU; 2; 11	TAU; 3; 6	MAN; 1; 2	MAN; 2; 5	MAN; 3 Ret	HMP; 1; 7	HMP; 2; 1	HMP; 3; 4	RUA; 1	RUA; 2	RUA; 3	HIG; 1	HIG; 2	HIG; 3	10th	130

=== Complete Formula Regional European Championship results ===
(key) (Races in bold indicate pole position) (Races in italics indicate fastest lap)

Year	Entrant	1	2	3	4	5	6	7	8	9	10	11	12	13	14	15	16	17	18	19	20	Pos	Points
2024	Trident	HOC; 1; 18	HOC; 2; 10	SPA; 1; 16	SPA; 2; 13	ZAN; 1; 18	ZAN; 2; 16	HUN; 1; 13	HUN; 2 Ret	MUG; 1; 20	MUG; 2; 20	LEC; 1; 9	LEC; 2; 16	IMO; 1; 19	IMO; 2; 13	RBR; 1; 22	RBR; 2; 21	CAT; 1; 16	CAT; 2; 16	MNZ; 1 Ret	MNZ; 2; 14	21st	3

=== Complete IMSA SportsCar Championship results ===
(key) (Races in bold indicate pole position; results in italics indicate fastest lap)

Year	Team	Class	Make	Engine	1	2	3	4	5	6	7	8	9	10	Pos.	Points
2025	Cetliar Racing	GTD	Ferrari 296 GT3	Ferrari F163CE 3.0 L Turbo V6	DAY; 20	SEB	LBH	LGA	WGL	MOS	ELK	VIR	IMS; 12	PET	58th	337

=== Complete FIA Formula 3 Championship results ===
(key) (Races in bold indicate pole position; races in italics indicate points for the fastest lap of the top-10 finishers)

Year	Entrant	1	2	3	4	5	6	7	8	9	10	11	12	13	14	15	16	17	18	19	20	Pos	Points
2025	DAMS Lucas Oil	MEL; SPR; 17	MEL; FEA; 24	BHR; SPR; Ret	BHR; FEA; 20	IMO; SPR; 15	IMO; FEA; 25	MON; SPR; Ret	MON; FEA; Ret	CAT; SPR; 19	CAT; FEA; 26†	RBR; SPR	RBR; FEA	SIL; SPR; 23	SIL; FEA; 15	SPA; SPR; 16	SPA; FEA; C	HUN; SPR; Ret	HUN; FEA; 18	MNZ; SPR; 28	MNZ; FEA; 22	33rd	0
2026	DAMS Lucas Oil	MEL; SPR; 11	MEL; FEA; 19	MON; SPR; 22	MON; FEA; 27†	CAT; SPR; 16	CAT; FEA; Ret	RBR; SPR; 12	RBR; FEA; 9	SIL; SPR; 23	SIL; FEA; Ret	SPA; SPR; 14	SPA; FEA; 18	HUN; SPR; 7	HUN; FEA; 18	MNZ; SPR; 9	MNZ; FEA; 1	MAD; SPR; 23	MAD; FEA1; 20	MAD; FEA2; 20		19th	33

† Driver did not finish the race, but was classified as he completed over 90% of the race distance.

=== Complete Asian Le Mans Series results ===
(key) (Races in bold indicate pole position) (Races in italics indicate fastest lap)

Year	Team	Car	Engine	Class	1	2	3	4	5	6	Pos.	Points
2026–27	Cetilar Racing	Hypercar	Ferrari 499P	Ferrari F163CG 3.0 L Turbo V6	**LEC**; **1**; 2	LEC; 2; 2	JER; 1	JER; 2	ALG; 1	ALG; 2	2nd*	37*

=== Complete FIA Formula 2 Championship results ===
(key) (Races in bold indicate pole position; races in italics indicate points for the fastest lap of the top-10 finishers)

Year	Entrant	1	2	3	4	5	6	7	8	9	10	11	12	13	14	15	16	17	18	19	20	21	22	23	24	25	26	27	28	DC	Points
2027	Prema Racing	BHR; SPR	BHR; FEA	JED; SPR	JED; FEA	MEL; SPR	MEL; FEA	MTL; SPR	MTL; FEA	MON; SPR	MON; FEA	SIL; SPR	SIL; FEA	RBR; SPR	RBR; FEA	MNZ; SPR	MNZ; FEA	MAD; SPR	MAD; FEA	BAK; SPR	BAK; FEA	IST; SPR	IST; FEA	MXC; SPR	MXC; FEA	LSL; SPR	LSL; FEA	YMC; SPR	YMC; FEA	TBD	TBD
