= Tuukka Taponen =

Finnish racing driver (born 2006)

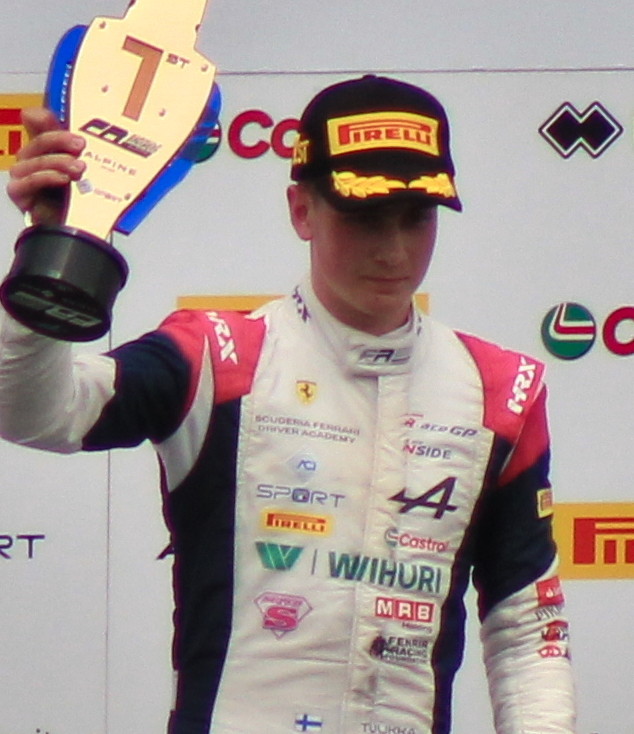
- Taponen in 2024
- Nationality: (Finland) Finnish
- Born: Tuukka Matti Samuli Taponen; 26 October 2006 (age 20) Lohja, Uusimaa, Finland

FIA Formula 3 Championship career
- Debut season: 2024
- Car number: 8
- Former teams: ART Grand Prix, MP Motorsport
- Starts: 40
- Wins: 1
- Podiums: 6
- Poles: 2
- Fastest laps: 3
- Best finish: 3rd in 2026

Previous series
- 2024–2026; 2024; 2024; 2023; 2023; 2023 2021–2022: FIA Formula 3; FR European; FR Middle East; Euro 4; Italian F4; F4 UAE; Formula Academy Finland

Championship titles
- 2024: FR Middle East
- Statistics up to date as of 15 September 2026.

Tuukka Matti Samuli Taponen (Finnish pronunciation: [ˈtuːkːɑ ˈtɑponen]; born 26 October 2006) is a Finnish racing driver who is set to compete in the FIA Formula 2 Championship for ART Grand Prix as part of the Ferrari Driver Academy.

Taponen won the senior Karting World Championship in 2021, and has since won the 2024 Formula Regional Middle East Championship and finished runner-up in the 2023 F4 UAE Championship. Taponen previously competed in the 2024 Formula Regional European Championship with R-ace GP, finishing third overall. He moved up to FIA Formula 3 in 2025, and finished third in 2026.

== Career ==
=== Karting ===
Taponen claims he started karting at the young age of two years old, when his father Marko was a racer of jokkis or folkrace, a Finnish form of low-cost rallycross. He also watched videos of his father racing jokkis, and other motorsport.

In 2017, Taponen made his competitive karting debut in the native Finland, in the Finnish Junior Championship, in the Raket Class, which he won. He came third in the Finnish Championship OK Junior class the following year, and won the championship in 2019. Taponen also won again the 2020 edition and once more in 2021, in the OK category.

Taponen made his CIK debut in the CIK-FIA Karting Academy Trophy and came thirteenth in his class. He also joined Kohtala Sports for the Rotax Max Challenge Grand Finals in the Junior class, and came seventeenth.

Taponen joined Kohtala Sports for the 2019 CIK-FIA European Championship and the 2019 CIK-FIA World Championship in the OKJ classes, and finished fourth and thirty-third in them.

In 2020, Taponen joined the Tony Kart team in the OK Junior category, and finished third in the CIK-FIA European Championship and runner-up in the CIK-FIA World Championship. He made his OK debut in 2021, and in his first weekend in the class, he won the 2021 CIK-FIA World Championship at Campillos. Taponen also won the WSK Open Cup in the same year as well, and at the end of the year he took part in the FDA Scouting World Finals but didn't win, and was instead put under special observation by Ferrari.

Taponen had a second appearance in the FDA Scouting World Finals in 2022, which secured his place at the Ferrari Driver Academy.

=== Formula 4 ===
==== Formula Academy Finland ====
Taponen made his single-seater debut in the 2021 Formula Academy Finland for Koiranen Kemppi Motorsport, in a part time campaign, he took a double win at the debut in the Kymi Ring, and in 2022, he did another part time campaign and came sixth in the championship, remaining unbeaten in all the races he competed in.

==== Formula 4 UAE Championship ====
Taponen made his first full time single-seater debut in the 2023 Formula 4 UAE Championship for Mumbai Falcons Racing Limited. At his first race weekend in the Dubai Autodrome Taponen achieved two podium finishes.

The second round in the Kuwait Motor Town only resulted in one third place which came in the second race, as he retired from the third race, but the next round in Kuwait Motor Town, was where he get his first win of the season in the second race. Taponen collected his two maiden poles in the fourth round in Dubai Autodrome, and also got a clean sweep of wins in all three races.

In the final round of the championship in the Yas Marina Circuit, Taponen collected two final second-place finishes, but retired from the final race, as he finished second in the championship with 212 points, four wins and two pole positions. Although he didn't win the championship title, he won the rookie title instead.

==== Italian F4 Championship ====
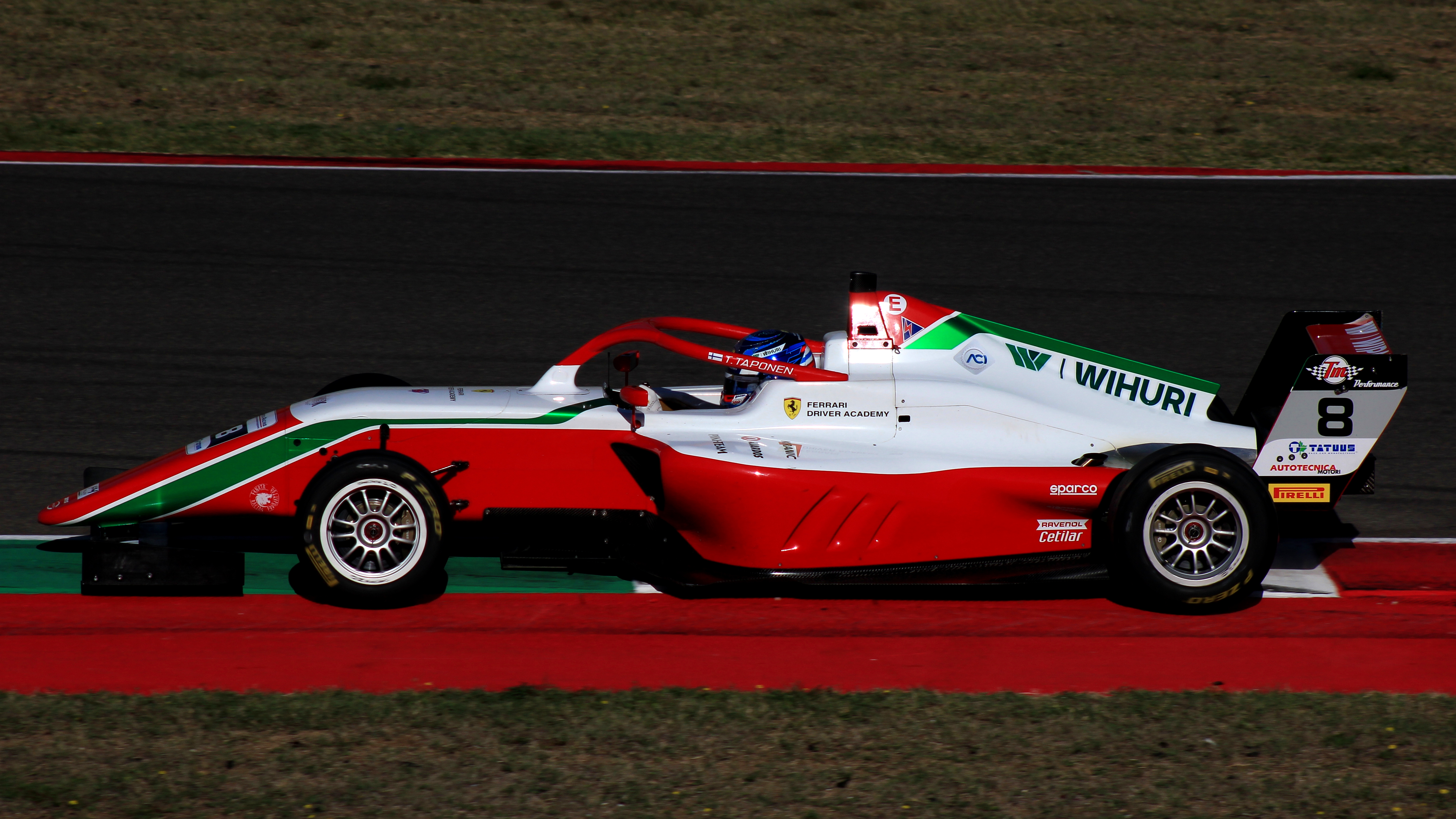
Taponen at the Mugello Circuit in 2023.

For his full time Formula 4 campaign, Taponen competed in the 2023 Italian F4 Championship for Prema Racing.

Taponen's debut round in the Italian F4 Championship proved to be underwhelming compared to his peers, he struggled to find his footing and ended the first round at Imola with only four points, two ninth-place finishes in the first two races, at the last race he was running in twelfth, but was hit behind the safety car and retired from the damage.

Misano was a much better improvement for Taponen, as he took his maiden pole position and was untouchable in the first race as he took his maiden win, and took a fourth and fifth-place finish in the next two races, bagging 47 points and propelling him to fifth place in the drivers' standings. The third race is Spa-Francorchamps was a decrease in form, as Taponen only managed two seventh-place finishes in the first and third race. Monza was highlighted by a lone podium in the first race, as he retired from the second race after a tangle with Alfio Spina.

At Paul Ricard, Taponen finished fifth in the first race, and climbed his way up to second place in the next race, he rounded off the final race with a third place.

At Mugello, Taponen and fellow Prema Racing drivers struggled with pace, as in the first race, Taponen was thought to have jumped the start, but had actually stalled on the grid and dropped to thirteenth. He recovered to ninth but after receiving a ten-second penalty, he dropped out of the points and into fifteenth place. In the next two races, he scored consistent top-five finishes, but didn't finish on the podium. The final round at Vallelunga was highlighted by a string of podiums, as he finished the season in fifth position with 196 points.

Taponen also contested the inaugural season of the Euro 4 Championship for Prema Racing. He was consistent with points, and got his maiden podiums at the final round in Circuit de Barcelona-Catalunya, he finished the championship in fifth with 102 points.

=== Formula Regional ===
==== Formula Regional Middle East Championship ====
Taponen would make his racing debut in Formula Regional machinery in the Formula Regional Middle East Championship for R-ace GP, partnering Jesse Carrasquedo Jr. and Zachary David. During the season, Taponen would earn 255 points and five wins in a title battle with Formula 2 driver Taylor Barnard, and fellow Ferrari Driver Academy junior and FRECA driver Rafael Câmara. He would claim the championship in race 1 of the fifth and final round.

After winning the title, Taponen's teammates Carrasquedo and David would earn zero and 112 points respectively, finishing 24th and fourth, with the latter being 143 points behind Taponen. He would win the rookie cup earning 315 points, 137 more than FRECA driver Ugo Ugochukwu and 143 more than FRECA driver James Wharton. He would also help his team R-ace GP to the team's championship trophy, the team collecting 312 points with the help of his teammates.

==== Formula Regional European Championship ====
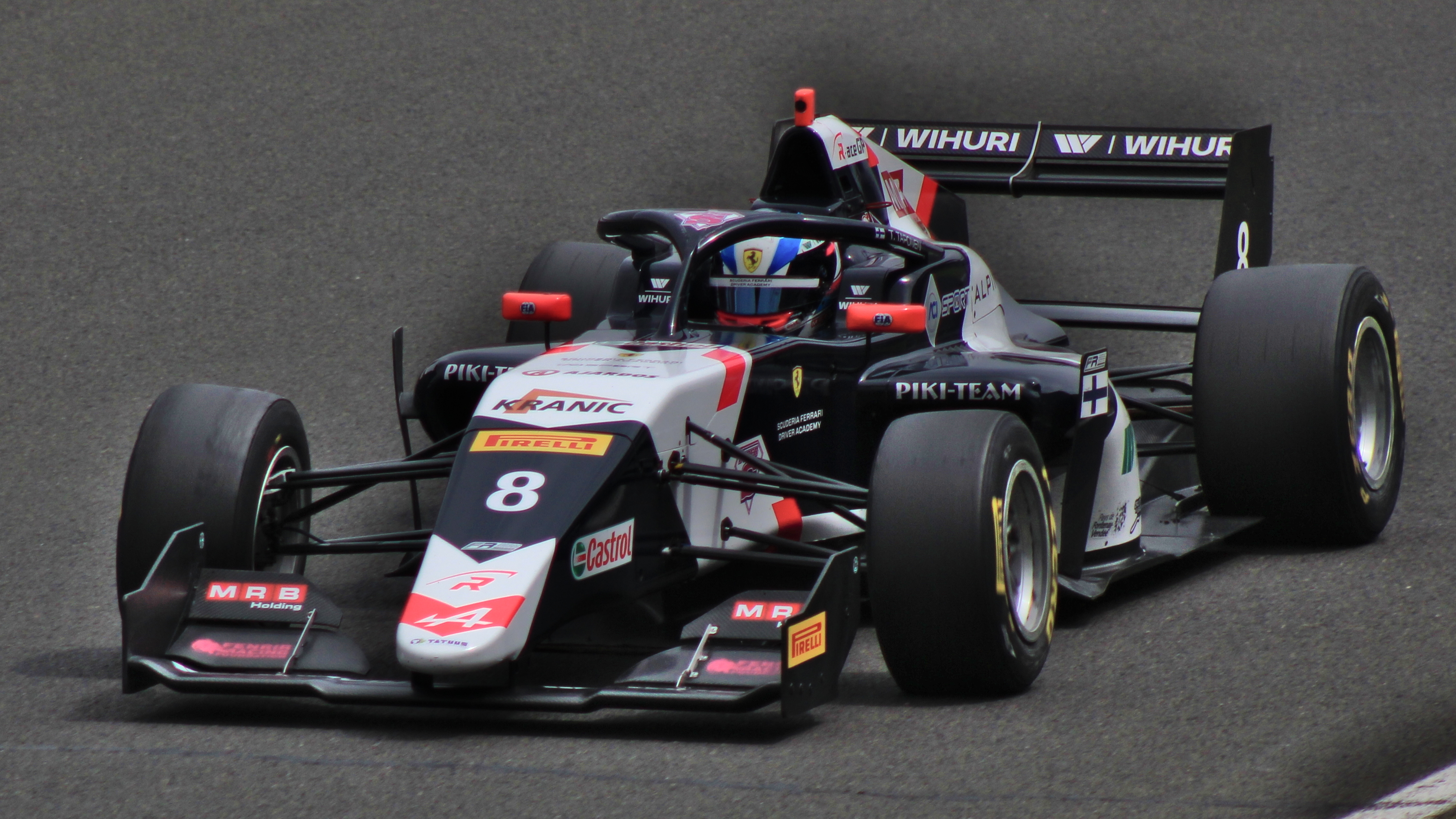
Taponen racing at the Hungaroring during the 2024 Formula Regional European Championship

Alongside his 2024 Formula Regional Middle East Championship campaign, Taponen tackled the 2024 Formula Regional European Championship for his full-time campaign, driving for R-ace GP alongside Enzo Deligny and FRMEC teammate Zachary David.

After a podium in his debut race at the Hockenheimring, Taponen got his maiden win not long after at the first race of the third round at Circuit Zandvoort. At the next round at the Hungaroring, he got his first pole positions in the series, alongside two more wins and fastest laps for both races. Taponen won the next race at Mugello Circuit, claiming another pole position. This was highest feat of the year for him, as he had a miserable second half of the season, retiring from five out of the last ten races and getting four points finishes, two of them being second-place finishes at the second rounds of Imola Circuit and Circuit de Barcelona-Catalunya.

With these disappointing performances, the championship battle was dominated by fellow Ferrari Driver Academy driver Rafael Câmara and his F4 UAE rival James Wharton pipped him to the titles runner-up after he had a strong second half of the season compared to Taponen.

Nevertheless, Taponen finished the championship in a strong third place with four wins, three pole positions, two fastest laps, seven podiums and 198 points.

==== Macau Grand Prix ====
Taponen also competed in the 2024 Macau Grand Prix, remaining with R-ace GP. He posted the second-fastest time in the first qualifying session, held in wet conditions. However, the second qualifying session was dry, so times were much faster. He crashed during the session, and only qualified in 20th overall. On the opening lap of the qualifying race, he once again crashed, but was able to avoid incidents to finish twelfth in the final race, and was promoted to tenth after two drivers ahead were disqualified.

=== FIA Formula 3 Championship ===
==== 2024 ====
Taponen made his FIA Formula 3 debut with ART Grand Prix at Spa-Francorchamps. He came 14th in the sprint race but retired in the feature.

Taponen finished the season 31st in the drivers standings, ranking as the highest part time driver in the championship.

==== 2025 ====
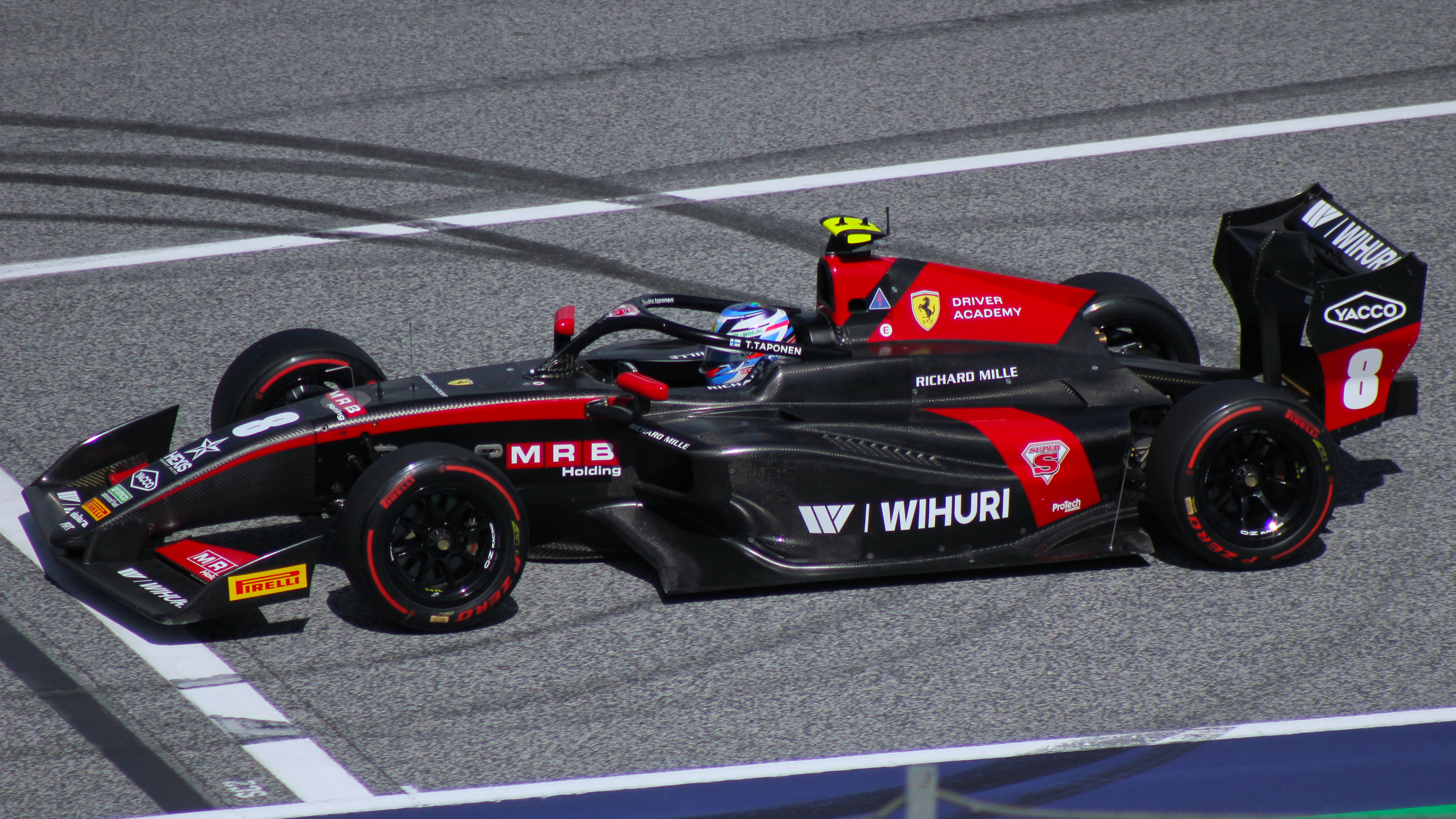
Taponen driving the Dallara F3 2025 during the 2025 Spielberg Formula 3 round

In October 2024, Taponen was again recruited by ART Grand Prix, this time to contest the full 2025 FIA Formula 3 season with the French outfit. He was joined at the team by FRECA rival James Wharton and returning driver Laurens van Hoepen. Taponen achieved his first Formula 3 podium in the sprint race at Sakhir, finishing third.

==== 2026 ====
In 2026, Taponen switched to MP Motorsport for his second season of Formula 3, alongside Formula 4 champions Alessandro Giusti and Mattia Colnaghi.

=== FIA Formula 2 Championship ===
Taponen will reunite with ART Grand Prix and make his Formula 2 debut in 2027.

=== Formula One ===
In 2023, Taponen joined the Ferrari Driver Academy after winning the FDA World Scouting Final.

== Karting record ==
=== Karting career summary ===
Season	Series	Team	Position
2017	Finnish Junior Championship — Raket		1st
2018	Finnish Championship — OKJ		3rd
2018	CIK-FIA Karting Academy Trophy		13th
2018	Rotax Max Challenge Grand Finals — Junior	Kohtala Sports	17th
2019	Estonian championship — OKJ	Hemet Racing	8th
2019	Finnish Championship — OKJ	Kohtala Sports	1st
2019	WSK Super Master Series — OKJ	Kohtala Sports	23rd
2019	CIK-FIA European Championship — OKJ	Kohtala Sports	4th
2019	CIK-FIA World Championship — OKJ	Kohtala Sports	33rd
2019	WSK Final Cup — OKJ	Kohtala Sports	18th
2020	Finnish Championship — OKJ	Kohtala Sports	1st
2020	WSK Super Master Series — OKJ	Kohtala Sports	13th
2020	WSK Euro Series — OKJ	Kohtala Sports	5th
2020	CIK-FIA European Championship — OKJ	Tony Kart Racing Team	3rd
2020	CIK-FIA World Championship — OKJ	Tony Kart Racing Team	2nd
2020	WSK Open Cup — OK	Tony Kart Racing Team	4th
2021	Finnish Championship — OK	Kohtala Sports	1st
2021	WSK Champions Cup — OK	Tony Kart Racing Team	4th
2021	WSK Super Master Series — OK	Tony Kart Racing Team	4th
2021	WSK Euro Series — OK	Tony Kart Racing Team	6th
2021	CIK-FIA European Championship — OK	Tony Kart Racing Team	9th
2021	CIK-FIA World Championship — OK	Tony Kart Racing Team	1st
2021	Champions of the Future — OK	Tony Kart Racing Team	4th
2021	WSK Open Cup — OK	Tony Kart Racing Team	1st
2022	WSK Super Master Series — OK	Tony Kart Racing Team	4th
2022	WSK Euro Series — OK	Tony Kart Racing Team	3rd
2022	Champions of the Future Winter Series — OK	Tony Kart Racing Team	4th
2022	Champions of the Future — OK	Tony Kart Racing Team	12th
2022	CIK-FIA European Championship — OK	Tony Kart Racing Team	6th
2022	CIK-FIA European Championship — KZ	Tony Kart Racing Team	11th
2022	CIK-FIA World Championship — OK	Tony Kart Racing Team	2nd
2022	CIK-FIA World Championship — KZ	Tony Kart Racing Team	9th

== Racing record ==
=== Racing career summary ===
Season	Series	Team	Races	Wins	Poles	F/Laps	Podiums	Points	Position
2021	Formula Academy Finland	Koiranen Kemppi Motorsport	2	2	?	?	?	?	?
2022	Formula Academy Finland	Koiranen Kemppi Motorsport	5	5	2	4	5	125	6th
2023	Formula 4 UAE Championship	Mumbai Falcons Racing Limited	15	4	2	2	10	212	**2nd**
2023	Italian F4 Championship	Prema Racing	21	1	1	0	7	196	5th
2023	Euro 4 Championship	Prema Racing	9	0	0	0	2	102	5th
2024	Formula Regional Middle East Championship	R-ace GP	15	5	5	7	9	255	**1st**
2024	Formula Regional European Championship	R-ace GP	20	4	3	2	7	198	**3rd**
2024	Macau Grand Prix	R-ace GP	1	0	0	0	0	N/A	10th
2024	FIA Formula 3 Championship	ART Grand Prix	2	0	0	0	0	0	31st
2025	FIA Formula 3 Championship	ART Grand Prix	19	0	0	0	3	67	9th
2026	FIA Formula 3 Championship	MP Motorsport	19	1	2	3	3	109	**3rd**
2027	FIA Formula 2 Championship	ART Grand Prix	0	0	0	0	0	0	TBD

* Season still in progress.

=== Complete Formula 4 UAE Championship results ===
(key) (Races in bold indicate pole position) (Races in italics indicate fastest lap)

Year	Team	1	2	3	4	5	6	7	8	9	10	11	12	13	14	15	Pos	Points
2023	Mumbai Falcons Racing Limited	DUB1; 1; 9	DUB1; 2; 2	DUB1; 3; 2	KMT1; 1; 6	KMT1; 2; 3	KMT1; 3 Ret	KMT2; 1; 3	KMT2; 2; 1	KMT2; 3; 34	**DUB2**; **1**; 1	DUB2; 2; 1	**DUB2**; **3**; 1	YMC; 1; 2	YMC; 2; 2	YMC; 3 Ret	2nd	212

=== Complete Italian F4 Championship results ===
(key) (Races in bold indicate pole position) (Races in italics indicate fastest lap)

Year	Team	1	2	3	4	5	6	7	8	9	10	11	12	13	14	15	16	17	18	19	20	21	22	DC	Points
2023	Prema Racing	IMO; 1; 9	IMO; 2; 9	IMO; 3	IMO; 4; 28†	**MIS**; **1**; 1	MIS; 2; 4	MIS; 3; 5	SPA; 1; 7	SPA; 2; 18	SPA; 3; 7	MNZ; 1; 3	MNZ; 2; 27†	MNZ; 3; 17	LEC; 1; 4	LEC; 2; 2	LEC; 3; 3	MUG; 1; 15	MUG; 2; 4	MUG; 3; 5	VLL; 1; 2	VLL; 2; 2	VLL; 3; 3	5th	196

=== Complete Euro 4 Championship results ===
(key) (Races in bold indicate pole position; races in italics indicate fastest lap)

Year	Team	1	2	3	4	5	6	7	8	9	DC	Points
2023	Prema Racing	MUG; 1; 8	MUG; 2; 18	MUG; 3; 8	MNZ; 1 Ret	MNZ; 2; 6	MNZ; 3; 5	CAT; 1; 5	CAT; 2; 3	CAT; 3; 3	5th	102

=== Complete Formula Regional Middle East Championship results ===
(key) (Races in bold indicate pole position) (Races in italics indicate fastest lap)

Year	Entrant	1	2	3	4	5	6	7	8	9	10	11	12	13	14	15	DC	Points
2024	R-ace GP	YMC1; 1; 2	YMC1; 2; 6	YMC1; 3; 4	**YMC2**; **1**; 1	YMC2; 2; 4	**YMC2**; **3**; 1	DUB1; 1; 2	DUB1; 2; 7	DUB1; 3; 2	YMC3; 1; 2	YMC3; 2; 5	**YMC3**; **3**; 1	**DUB2**; **1**; 1	DUB2; 2; 5	**DUB2**; **3**; 1	1st	255

=== Complete Formula Regional European Championship results ===
(key) (Races in bold indicate pole position) (Races in italics indicate fastest lap)

Year	Team	1	2	3	4	5	6	7	8	9	10	11	12	13	14	15	16	17	18	19	20	DC	Points
2024	R-ace GP	HOC; 1; 2	HOC; 2; 9	SPA; 1; 13	SPA; 2; 5	ZAN; 1; 1	ZAN; 2; 6	**HUN**; **1**; 1	**HUN**; **2**; 1	**MUG**; **1**; 1	MUG; 2; 4	LEC; 1; 5	LEC; 2 Ret	IMO; 1; 2	IMO; 2 Ret	RBR; 1; 12	RBR; 2 Ret	CAT; 1; 2	CAT; 2 Ret	MNZ; 1; 9	MNZ; 2 Ret	3rd	198

=== Complete Macau Grand Prix results ===
Year	Team	Car	Qualifying	Quali Race	Main race
2024	(France) R-ace GP	Tatuus F3 T318	20th	DNF	10th

=== Complete FIA Formula 3 Championship results ===
(key) (Races in bold indicate pole position) (Races in italics indicate fastest lap)

Year	Entrant	1	2	3	4	5	6	7	8	9	10	11	12	13	14	15	16	17	18	19	20	DC	Points
2024	ART Grand Prix	BHR; SPR	BHR; FEA	MEL; SPR	MEL; FEA	IMO; SPR	IMO; FEA	MON; SPR	MON; FEA	CAT; SPR	CAT; FEA	RBR; SPR	RBR; FEA	SIL; SPR	SIL; FEA	HUN; SPR	HUN; FEA	SPA; SPR; 14	SPA; FEA; Ret	MNZ; SPR	MNZ; FEA	31st	0
2025	ART Grand Prix	MEL; SPR; 14	MEL; FEA; 20	BHR; SPR; 3	BHR; FEA; 4	IMO; SPR; 7	IMO; FEA; 4	MON; SPR; 2	MON; FEA; 7	CAT; SPR; Ret	CAT; FEA; 19	RBR; SPR; Ret	RBR; FEA; 20	SIL; SPR; 18	SIL; FEA; 10	SPA; SPR; 18	SPA; FEA; C	HUN; SPR; 11	HUN; FEA; 3	MNZ; SPR; 11	MNZ; FEA; 15	9th	67
2026	MP Motorsport	MEL; SPR; 12	MEL; FEA; 13	MON; SPR; Ret	MON; FEA; Ret	CAT; SPR; 4	CAT; FEA; 14	RBR; SPR; 6	RBR; FEA; 7	SIL; SPR; 17	SIL; FEA; 12	SPA; SPR; 7	SPA; FEA; 7	HUN; SPR; 6	**HUN**; **FEA**; 5	MNZ; SPR; Ret	MNZ; FEA; 2	MAD; SPR; 10	MAD; FEA1; 3	**MAD**; **FEA2**; 1		3rd	109

=== Complete FIA Formula 2 Championship results ===
(key) (Races in bold indicate pole position) (Races in italics indicate fastest lap)

Year	Entrant	1	2	3	4	5	6	7	8	9	10	11	12	13	14	15	16	17	18	19	20	21	22	23	24	25	26	27	28	DC	Points
2027	ART Grand Prix	BHR; SPR	BHR; FEA	JED; SPR	JED; FEA	MEL; SPR	MEL; FEA	MTL; SPR	MTL; FEA	MON; SPR	MON; FEA	SIL; SPR	SIL; FEA	RBR; SPR	RBR; FEA	MNZ; SPR	MNZ; FEA	MAD; SPR	MAD; FEA	BAK; SPR	BAK; FEA	IST; SPR	IST; FEA	MXC; SPR	MXC; FEA	LSL; SPR	LSL; FEA	YMC; SPR	YMC; FEA	TBD	TBD

Sporting positions
Preceded by Rafael Câmara	Formula 4 UAE Championship; Rookies' Champion; 2023	Succeeded by Kean Nakamura-Berta
Preceded by Andrea Kimi Antonelli	Formula Regional Middle East Championship; Champion; 2024	Succeeded by Evan Giltaire
Preceded by Andrea Kimi Antonelli	Formula Regional Middle East Championship; Rookies' Champion; 2024	Succeeded by Freddie Slater
