= 2024 Formula Regional European Championship =

Motor racing competition

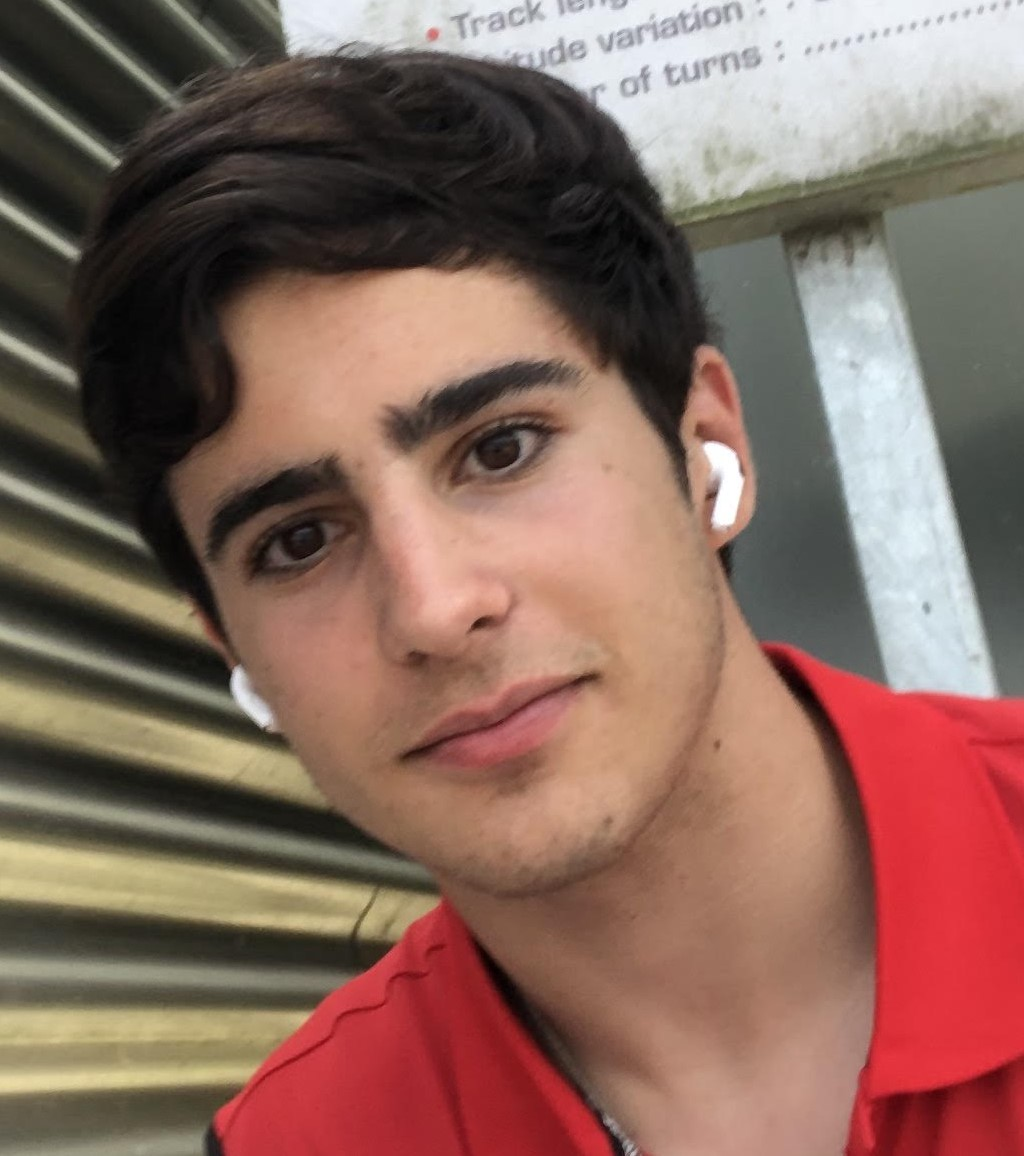
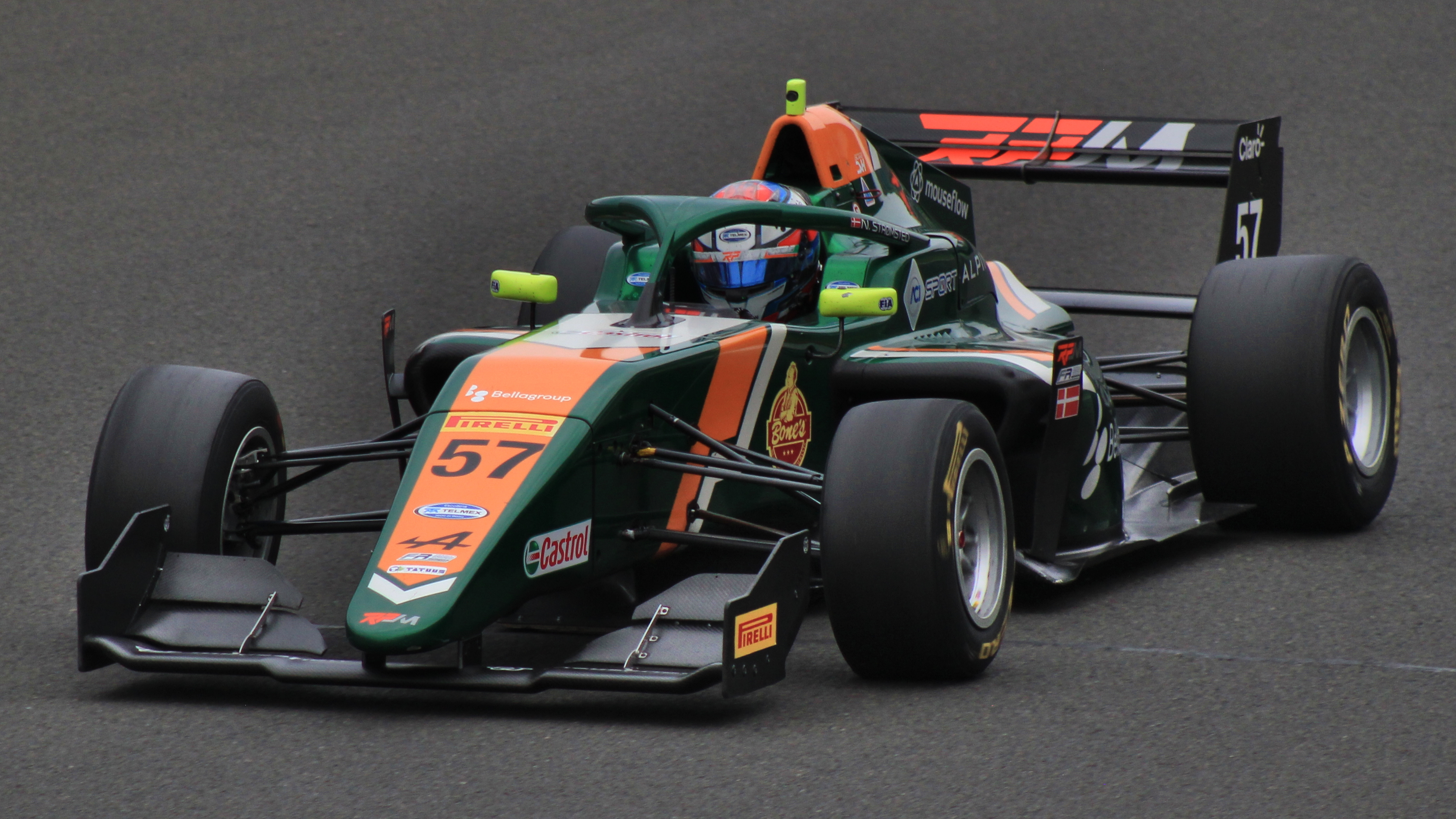
Prema driver Rafael Câmara (top) won the Drivers' Championship, while RPM's Noah Strømsted (bottom) took the Rookie Championship.

The 2024 Formula Regional European Championship by Alpine was a multi-event, Formula Regional open-wheel single seater motor racing championship held across Europe. The championship featured a mix of professional and amateur drivers, competing in Formula Regional cars that conform to the FIA Formula Regional regulations for the championship. This was the sixth season of the championship and the fourth after a merger with Formula Renault Eurocup which resulted in the change of the engine supplier to Alpine.

Prema Racing won the Teams' Championship for the third consecutive year, clinching it at the first race of the penultimate round. One race later and with two races to spare, their driver Rafael Câmara won the Drivers' Championship. RPM driver Noah Strømsted won the Rookie Championship at the final race of the season.

== Teams and drivers ==
The same twelve teams that contested the 2023 season were also pre-selected for the 2024 season. Arden Motorsport and Monolite Racing later relinquished their entries, confirming their withdrawal in April, while Iron Dames joined the championship and fielded an all-female lineup.

Team	No.	Driver	Status	Rounds
(France) Saintéloc Racing	2	(Italy) Matteo De Palo	R	All
(France) Saintéloc Racing	44	(France) Théophile Naël		All
(France) Saintéloc Racing	74	(France) Enzo Peugeot	R	All
(Italy) Prema Racing	3	(United States) Ugo Ugochukwu		All
(Italy) Prema Racing	5	(Brazil) Rafael Câmara		All
(Italy) Prema Racing	13	(Australia) James Wharton		All
(Italy) Trident	4	(United Kingdom) Roman Biliński (Note: Biliński is a Polish-British driver who competed under a Polish licence in rounds 1–2 and a British licence in rounds 7–10.)		1–2, 7–10
(Italy) Trident	4	(Kyrgyzstan) Michael Belov (Note: Bedrin and Belov are Russian, but they competed under Italian and Kyrgyz licences respectively as Russian national emblems were banned by the FIA following the Russian invasion of Ukraine.)		4–6
(Italy) Trident	7	(Italy) Nicola Lacorte	R	All
(Italy) Trident	66	(China) Ruiqi Liu		All
(Finland) KIC Motorsport	6	(Vietnam) Alex Sawer	R	1–6, 8–10
(Finland) KIC Motorsport	29	(Thailand) Nandhavud Bhirombhakdi	R	All
(Finland) KIC Motorsport	43	(Australia) Costa Toparis		1–2
(Finland) KIC Motorsport	43	(United Kingdom) John Bennett		3
(Finland) KIC Motorsport	43	(China) Gao Yujia		4–6
(Finland) KIC Motorsport	43	(Netherlands) Maya Weug		7
(Finland) KIC Motorsport	43	(United States) Enzo Scionti		9
(France) R-ace GP	8	(Finland) Tuukka Taponen		All
(France) R-ace GP	20	(Malta) Zachary David		All
(France) R-ace GP	23	(France) Enzo Deligny	R	All
(Switzerland) G4 Racing	9	(United Kingdom) Kanato Le (Note: Le is a Japanese driver who competed under a British licence.)	R	All
(Switzerland) G4 Racing	16	(France) Romain Andriolo	R	All
(Switzerland) G4 Racing	33	(Mexico) Jesse Carrasquedo Jr.		1–4
(Switzerland) G4 Racing	33	(Brazil) Álvaro Cho	R	5–6
(Switzerland) G4 Racing	33	(United States) Jett Bowling		9–10
(France) ART Grand Prix	10	(France) Alessandro Giusti		All
(France) ART Grand Prix	14	(Switzerland) Léna Bühler		1–6
(France) ART Grand Prix	95	(France) Evan Giltaire	R	All
(France) ART Grand Prix	96	(Ukraine) Yaroslav Veselaho		All
(Netherlands) MP Motorsport	11	(Italy) Nikita Bedrin		1, 3, 5, 7–10
(Netherlands) MP Motorsport	11	(United Kingdom) Isaac Barashi		4, 6
(Netherlands) MP Motorsport	47	(India) Nikhil Bohra		All
(Netherlands) MP Motorsport	55	(Italy) Valerio Rinicella	R	All
(Netherlands) Van Amersfoort Racing	15	(Italy) Brando Badoer		All
(Netherlands) Van Amersfoort Racing	22	(Brazil) Pedro Clerot	R	All
(Netherlands) Van Amersfoort Racing	89	(Portugal) Ivan Domingues	R	All
(Italy) Iron Dames	19	(Spain) Marta García		All
(Italy) Iron Dames	28	(France) Doriane Pin	R	1–2, 5–10
(Italy) RPM	27	(France) Edgar Pierre	R	All
(Italy) RPM	57	(Denmark) Noah Strømsted	R	All
(Italy) RPM	99	(Italy) Giovanni Maschio		All

Icon	Status
R	Rookie

=== Team changes ===
Arden Motorsport withdrew from the championship, instead electing to focus on their GB3 and GB4 efforts.

Monolite Racing, a mainstay in the series since 2020, also elected to withdraw after talks with GB3 race winner James Hedley and Jacques Villeneuve protégé Kevin Foster did not materialise.

Iron Dames, a female talent development project owned by DC Racing Solutions, entered the championship with two cars. Their cars were operated by Prema Racing.

=== Driver changes ===
Reigning Teams' Champions Prema Racing saw two of their drivers leave the championship, with reigning Driver's Champion Andrea Kimi Antonelli graduating to the team's Formula 2 outfit and Lorenzo Fluxá joining Cool Racing's ELMS program. To replace them, Prema signed 2023 Euro 4 champion, McLaren junior Ugo Ugochukwu, and 2023 F4 UAE Champion James Wharton.

R-ace GP had an all-new lineup in 2024 as their three drivers Martinius Stenshorne, Matías Zagazeta and Tim Tramnitz all graduated to FIA F3 with Hitech Pulse-Eight, Jenzer Motorsport and MP Motorsport respectively. The team signed three F4 graduates for their 2024 lineup: UAE Formula 4 runner-up and Ferrari junior Tuukka Taponen stepped up to FRECA after winning FRMEC with the team over the winter, Red Bull junior Enzo Deligny debuted in the category after coming fourth in Spanish F4 with Campos Racing and Zachary David joined the series after a pair of seventh places in Italian F4 and Euro 4 with US Racing.

Van Amersfoort Racing saw Joshua Dufek graduate to FIA F3 with PHM AIX Racing, Niels Koolen move over to America to join HMD Motorsport in Indy NXT and Kas Haverkort join GP Elite in the Porsche Supercup. The trio was replaced by three drivers stepping up from F4. 2022 Brazilian F4 champion Pedro Clerot graduated to Formula Regional after coming sixth in the 2023 Spanish F4 Championship with MP Motorsport. The other two drivers stemmed from VAR's own Italian F4 and Euro 4 outfits in Ivan Domingues, who already debuted for the team as a guest driver during the final two FRECA rounds of that year, and Brando Badoer, who also collected Formula Regional experience through a FRMEC campaign with PHM AIX.

RPM also saw all three of their drivers leave the series. Santiago Ramos joined Trident for F3, Adam Fitzgerald joined Turn 3 Motorsport in USF Pro 2000 and Macéo Capietto joined Iron Lynx in ELMS. The team signed two F4 graduates and a series sophomore in Noah Strømsted, who stepped up from Spanish and UAE F4 competition after a successful guest driver cameo in 2023, Edgar Pierre, who came 9th in French F4 in 2023, and Giovanni Maschio, who embarked on his second season in the championship after coming 34th with Monolite Racing in 2023.

G4 Racing saw Alessandro Giusti move over to ART Grand Prix for his sophomore season, while Pierre-Alexandre Provost joined MV2S in the European Endurance Prototype Cup and Michael Belov left the championship. Three more F4 drivers joined the grid for G4, two of them with previous Formula Regional experience. Romain Andriolo came fourth in French F4 in 2023, Jesse Carrasquedo Jr. competed in Spanish, Italian and UAE F4 before debuting in the championship as a guest driver for VAR for two rounds in 2023, and Kanato Le, the first Japanese driver racing in the series, came seventh in British F4 ahead of a FRMEC campaign with R-ace GP.

MP Motorsport promoted Valerio Rinicella from their Spanish and UAE F4 outfit after he came third and fourth respectively in 2023. He replaced Sami Meguetounif, who stepped up to Formula 3 with Trident. The team also recruited Nikhil Bohra, who moved over from Trident after coming 12th with the Italian team in 2023 to fill the seat of the late Dilano van 't Hoff. MP's lineup was completed by Nikita Bedrin, who embarked on the 2024 campaign alongside an FIA F3 campaign with PHM Racing after four guest appearances in 2023 with Monolite and VAR. His dual campaign saw him miss the rounds at Spa, Hungaroring and Paul Ricard to prioritize F3. He replaced Victor Bernier, who joined Martinet by Alméras in the Porsche Supercup.

Trident signed two new drivers to replace Eurocup-3-bound Owen Tangavelou and MP-bound Nikhil Bohra. The team recruited Alpine Academy driver Nicola Lacorte, who stepped up to the category after coming ninth in both the Italian F4 and the Euro 4 Championship in 2023, and Ruiqi Liu, who also contested multiple Formula 4 championships in 2023, culminating in a fourth place in the Formula Winter Series with US Racing.

ART Grand Prix promoted two drivers to FIA F3 in Laurens van Hoepen, who remained with their outfit, and Charlie Wurz, who joined Jenzer. Marcus Amand also left the team to join Schumacher CLRT in the Porsche Carrera Cup France. Alessandro Giusti replaced van Hoepen, moving over from G4 Racing after taking three victories and sixth place with the team in his rookie season in 2023. Yaroslav Veselaho replaced Amand after making his Formula Regional debut in the Middle Eastern championship with Xcel Motorsport. 2023 French F4 champion Evan Giltaire remained with ART after already joining the team as a guest driver for the last two rounds of the 2023 season in place of Wurz. F1 Academy runner-up Léna Bühler completed ART's lineup, returning to the championship where she drove for R-ace GP in 2021 and 2022 as part of an agreement allowing FRECA teams to run a fourth car for one of the top three F1 Academy finishers.

Saintéloc Racing fielded an all-new lineup after Lucas Medina, Emerson Fittipaldi Jr. and Esteban Masson left the team, with Fittipaldi Jr. moving to the Eurocup-3, Masson joining Akkodis ASP in the World Endurance Championship and Medina joining Team Virage in the Ligier European Series. The team signed three F4 graduates: Matteo De Palo, who competed in four different Formula 4-level series in 2023 and came fifth in the Spanish championship, French Formula 4 runner-up Enzo Peugeot and Théophile Naël, who won the Spanish F4 championship and already completed a FRMEC campaign, both also with Saintéloc.

KIC Motorsport saw their only full-time driver Maya Weug leave the team to join Prema Racing in F1 Academy. The team recruited Costa Toparis, who drove for Evans GP in FRMEC at the start of the year and received technical assistance from the Australian team. Nandhavud Bhirombhakdi, who competed in various Formula 4 championships in the previous two years, and Alex Sawer, who came fifth in the inaugural Indian F4 Championship, joined him.

Newcomers Iron Dames fielded an all-female lineup consisting of 2023 F1 Academy champion Marta García, who was previously slated to drive a fourth Prema entry, and Mercedes junior Doriane Pin, who also competed in F1 Academy with Prema Racing.

=== Mid-season changes ===
Both Roman Biliński and Doriane Pin were absent from the third round at Zandvoort as they were recovering from injuries: Pin fractured her ribs in an incident during the Spa round, while Biliński suffered a road accident that saw him get hospitalized. Biliński later disclosed that he underwent surgery to repair two broken vertebrae, which kept him out of the cockpit for an extended period. KIC Motorsport also altered its lineup, with GB3 race winner John Bennett called up to replace Costa Toparis.

Ahead of the fourth round, KIC Motorsport announced Chinese driver Gao Yujia, 31st in FRMEC in his first Formula Regional appearance, would pilot the team's No. 43 car previously occupied by Toparis and Bennett for the remainder of the season. Trident announced that Michael Belov would return to the championship to replace the injured Biliński at the Hungaroring, marking the fourth year where he would compete in the series. At MP Motorsport, Isaac Barashi stepped in for Bedrin, returning to the team that he came 30th in FRMEC with.

Jesse Carrasquedo Jr. left G4 Racing and the championship ahead of round 5 to join Campos Racing in Eurocup-3. He was replaced by Brazilian F4 race-winner Álvaro Cho. Doriane Pin returned from Mugello onwards.

Barashi once again stepped in to replace Bedrin at Paul Ricard.

Ahead of the round at Imola, Léna Bühler announced she would end her campaign with ART Grand Prix early. KIC meanwhile announced the return of Maya Weug for that round in place of Gao Yujia. She had last competed with the team in 2023, before moving to F1 Academy for 2024. Biliński returned after recovering from his injury, while G4 Racing's Álvaro Cho and KIC's Alex Sawer were absent. Sawer was initially announced to return for the round at Spielberg, but withdrew.

In the days leading up to the penultimate round, G4 Racing announced that FR Americas podium finisher Jett Bowling would join the team for the remainder of the season. KIC also announced a new driver signing for Barcelona in Enzo Scionti, who drove for Monolite Racing in 2023 where he came 31st.

== Race calendar ==
The calendar was revealed on 13 October 2023. The championship visited the same ten destinations as the year before.

Round		Circuit	Date	Supporting	Map of circuit locations
1	R1	(Germany) Hockenheimring, Hockenheim	11 May	International GT Open; GT Cup Open Europe	2024 Formula Regional European Championship is located in Europe
1	R2	(Germany) Hockenheimring, Hockenheim	12 May	International GT Open; GT Cup Open Europe	2024 Formula Regional European Championship is located in Europe
2	R1	(Belgium) Circuit de Spa-Francorchamps, Stavelot	25 May	International GT Open; GT Cup Open Europe	2024 Formula Regional European Championship is located in Europe
2	R2	(Belgium) Circuit de Spa-Francorchamps, Stavelot	26 May	International GT Open; GT Cup Open Europe	2024 Formula Regional European Championship is located in Europe
3	R1	(Netherlands) Circuit Zandvoort, Zandvoort	8 June	Deutsche Tourenwagen Masters	2024 Formula Regional European Championship is located in Europe
3	R2	(Netherlands) Circuit Zandvoort, Zandvoort	9 June	Deutsche Tourenwagen Masters	2024 Formula Regional European Championship is located in Europe
4	R1	(Hungary) Hungaroring, Mogyoród	22 June	International GT Open	2024 Formula Regional European Championship is located in Europe
4	R2	(Hungary) Hungaroring, Mogyoród	23 June	International GT Open	2024 Formula Regional European Championship is located in Europe
5	R1	(Italy) Mugello Circuit, Scarperia e San Piero	13 July	Italian GT Championship; Porsche Carrera Cup Italy	2024 Formula Regional European Championship is located in Europe
5	R2	(Italy) Mugello Circuit, Scarperia e San Piero	14 July	Italian GT Championship; Porsche Carrera Cup Italy	2024 Formula Regional European Championship is located in Europe
6	R1	(France) Circuit Paul Ricard, Le Castellet	20 July	International GT Open; GT Cup Open Europe	2024 Formula Regional European Championship is located in Europe
6	R2	(France) Circuit Paul Ricard, Le Castellet	21 July	International GT Open; GT Cup Open Europe	2024 Formula Regional European Championship is located in Europe
7	R1	(Italy) Imola Circuit, Imola	7 September	Italian GT Championship; Porsche Carrera Cup Italy	2024 Formula Regional European Championship is located in Europe
7	R2	(Italy) Imola Circuit, Imola	8 September	Italian GT Championship; Porsche Carrera Cup Italy	2024 Formula Regional European Championship is located in Europe
8	R1	(Austria) Red Bull Ring, Spielberg	14 September	International GT Open	2024 Formula Regional European Championship is located in Europe
8	R2	(Austria) Red Bull Ring, Spielberg	15 September	International GT Open	2024 Formula Regional European Championship is located in Europe
9	R1	(Spain) Circuit de Barcelona-Catalunya, Montmeló	28 September	International GT Open; GT Cup Open Europe	2024 Formula Regional European Championship is located in Europe
9	R2	(Spain) Circuit de Barcelona-Catalunya, Montmeló	29 September	International GT Open; GT Cup Open Europe	2024 Formula Regional European Championship is located in Europe
10	R1	(Italy) Monza Circuit, Monza	26 October	Italian GT Championship	2024 Formula Regional European Championship is located in Europe
10	R2	(Italy) Monza Circuit, Monza	27 October	Italian GT Championship	2024 Formula Regional European Championship is located in Europe

== Race results ==
Round		Circuit	Pole position	Fastest lap	Winning driver	Winning team	Rookie winner
1	R1	(Germany) Hockenheimring	(Brazil) Rafael Câmara	(Brazil) Rafael Câmara	(Brazil) Rafael Câmara	(Italy) Prema Racing	(Portugal) Ivan Domingues
1	R2	(Germany) Hockenheimring	(Australia) James Wharton	(France) Evan Giltaire	(France) Evan Giltaire	(France) ART Grand Prix	(France) Evan Giltaire
2	R1	(Belgium) Circuit de Spa-Francorchamps	(United Kingdom) Roman Biliński	(Denmark) Noah Strømsted	(Brazil) Rafael Câmara	(Italy) Prema Racing	(Denmark) Noah Strømsted
2	R2	(Belgium) Circuit de Spa-Francorchamps	(Brazil) Rafael Câmara	(Brazil) Rafael Câmara	(Brazil) Rafael Câmara	(Italy) Prema Racing	(Denmark) Noah Strømsted
3	R1	(Netherlands) Circuit Zandvoort	(Australia) James Wharton	(Brazil) Rafael Câmara	(Finland) Tuukka Taponen	(France) R-ace GP	(Brazil) Pedro Clerot
3	R2	(Netherlands) Circuit Zandvoort	(Brazil) Rafael Câmara	(Brazil) Rafael Câmara	(Brazil) Rafael Câmara	(Italy) Prema Racing	(Denmark) Noah Strømsted
4	R1	(Hungary) Hungaroring	(Finland) Tuukka Taponen	(Finland) Tuukka Taponen	(Finland) Tuukka Taponen	(France) R-ace GP	(France) Evan Giltaire
4	R2	(Hungary) Hungaroring	(Finland) Tuukka Taponen	(Finland) Tuukka Taponen	(Finland) Tuukka Taponen	(France) R-ace GP	(France) Enzo Deligny
5	R1	(Italy) Mugello Circuit	(Finland) Tuukka Taponen	(Italy) Brando Badoer	(Finland) Tuukka Taponen	(France) R-ace GP	(Portugal) Ivan Domingues
5	R2	(Italy) Mugello Circuit	(Italy) Brando Badoer	(Italy) Brando Badoer	(Australia) James Wharton	(Italy) Prema Racing	(Brazil) Pedro Clerot
6	R1	(France) Circuit Paul Ricard	(Brazil) Rafael Câmara	(Brazil) Rafael Câmara	(Brazil) Rafael Câmara	(Italy) Prema Racing	(Portugal) Ivan Domingues
6	R2	(France) Circuit Paul Ricard	(Brazil) Rafael Câmara	(Denmark) Noah Strømsted	(France) Alessandro Giusti	(France) ART Grand Prix	(Denmark) Noah Strømsted
7	R1	(Italy) Imola Circuit	(Brazil) Rafael Câmara	(Brazil) Rafael Câmara	(Brazil) Rafael Câmara	(Italy) Prema Racing	(France) Enzo Deligny
7	R2	(Italy) Imola Circuit	(Brazil) Rafael Câmara	(France) Alessandro Giusti	(France) Alessandro Giusti	(France) ART Grand Prix	(Denmark) Noah Strømsted
8	R1	(Austria) Red Bull Ring	(Australia) James Wharton	(Italy) Nicola Lacorte	(Australia) James Wharton	(Italy) Prema Racing	(France) Evan Giltaire
8	R2	(Austria) Red Bull Ring	(Denmark) Noah Strømsted	(Denmark) Noah Strømsted	(France) Théophile Naël	(France) Saintéloc Racing	(Denmark) Noah Strømsted
9	R1	(Spain) Circuit de Barcelona-Catalunya	(Australia) James Wharton	(Australia) James Wharton	(Australia) James Wharton	(Italy) Prema Racing	(Denmark) Noah Strømsted
9	R2	(Spain) Circuit de Barcelona-Catalunya	(Australia) James Wharton	(Australia) James Wharton	(Australia) James Wharton	(Italy) Prema Racing	(Brazil) Pedro Clerot
10	R1	(Italy) Monza Circuit	(United States) Ugo Ugochukwu	(Brazil) Rafael Câmara	(United States) Ugo Ugochukwu	(Italy) Prema Racing	(France) Evan Giltaire
10	R2	(Italy) Monza Circuit	(France) Théophile Naël	(France) Alessandro Giusti	(Brazil) Rafael Câmara	(Italy) Prema Racing	(France) Enzo Peugeot

== Season report ==
=== Opening rounds ===
FRECA’s 2024 season began where 2023 finished: at the Hockenheimring. Prema’s Rafael Câmara claimed pole position for the opening race of the year. A slow start saw him drop to third behind the R-ace GP pair of Enzo Deligny and Tuukka Taponen, but he only needed eight corners to retake the lead. Taponen then took second place from Deligny, before Câmara’s teammate James Wharton was able to pass both of them and move into second. The top three finished that way, but Wharton was later penalised one position, handing second place back to Taponen. VAR’s Ivan Domingues surprised in qualifying for the second race by taking pole position, but Wharton started the race in first after his previously disallowed lap times were reinstated. ART’s Evan Giltaire took the lead, while Wharton dropped down, collided with VAR’s Pedro Clerot and retired. Giltaire held off Câmara through four safety car interruptions to win his first FRECA race, with Domingues third. Câmara ended the first round with a 18-point lead over Giltaire.

Spa hosted round two, and Trident’s Roman Biliński took pole position for the first race in a wet qualifying session. He survived the first lap in the lead while Câmara, who had started sixth, had already climbed up to fourth. The Brazilian then fought with RPM’s Noah Strømsted for third, before both were able to pass R-ace GP’s Zachary David for second. The pair continued forward and demoted Biliński to third, before Câmara took the lead. He held on to win the race, while Strømsted was handed a post-race penalty that dropped him to fourth. Câmara went on to take pole position for the second race and began the race fighting off Wharton before Taponen went past both of them into Les Combes. Câmara retook the lead on lap four, with the Finn then dropping behind Strømsted and Wharton, who had a lock-up into La Source earlier that removed him out of contention for the win. With three wins out of four races, Câmara had already gapped his closest challenger, Giltaire, by 60 points in the standings after just two weekends.

Next up was Zandvoort, where Wharton was fastest in qualifying for race one. Heavy rain prompted a safety car start, with the first half of the race completed under yellow. When the field was released, Wharton quickly built up a gap before spinning at Hugenholtz and dropping to 16th. That promoted Taponen into the lead ahead of Câmara and ART’s Alessandro Giusti before the safety car came out again. Taponen was able to hold Câmara behind at the final restart to claim his maiden FRECA win. Qualifying for the second race was topped by Câmara by over half a second. VAR’s Brando Badoer started second, while Giusti fought off Strømsted for third. After an early safety car, the top three gapped the rest of the field and their positions remained unchanged until the end of the race. Taponen tried taking fourth from Strømsted, but found no way past before then losing out to Clerot and dropping to fifth. Still, he now was second in the championship standings, albeit with a massive 73-point disadvantage to runaway leader Câmara.

=== Mid-season rounds ===
Round four was held at the Hungaroring and it began in wet conditions with Taponen topping the first qualifying session. He comfortably controlled the first race to take a lights-to-flag victory, while the other podium places were fiercely contested. David and Badoer were second and third for the opening part of the race, before Badoer attacked David for second place and other cars behind joined the fight. Both managed to stay in their positions, before a post-race penalty for David handed Badoer second place and promoted Câmara onto the podium. Taponen’s advantage continued onto the next day as he took another pole position. Prema’s Ugo Ugochukwu rose past Badoer and Câmara from fourth to second at the start, but ran off track later to allow both of them back past. The positions remained static from thereon, but post-race penalties changed the podium again. Câmara dropped to sixth, allowing Ugochukwu into third. Another faultless victory by Taponen saw him reduce Câmara’s championship lead to 49 points.

At Mugello, Taponen secured his third consecutive pole position for the first race. Badoer started alongside him but was unable to overtake at the start and soon had to defend against Clerot following an early race restart. Despite the pressure, Clerot could not find a way past. Badoer maintained close pursuit of Taponen for several laps before the Finn extended his lead and secured a comfortable victory. Clerot, who initially held third, was overtaken by Domingues on the penultimate lap, while Câmara finished in fifth place. Badoer ended Taponen’s pole position streak by setting the fastest time in qualifying for race two. Wharton, starting alongside Badoer, claimed the lead at the first corner, with Câmara following through two corners later. Badoer managed to reclaim second place and pursued Wharton closely but could not mount a challenge, resulting in Wharton’s first FRECA victory. Câmara, initially in third, fell to fifth following a post-race penalty, which promoted Clerot to third and Taponen to fourth, 24 points behind in the championship.

Round six of the championship at Paul Ricard commenced with Câmara securing pole position for the opening race. Michael Belov, filling in for the injured Biliński at Trident, lined up beside him on the front row. The race concluded without significant changes at the front, as Câmara clinched his fifth victory of the season, while Badoer maintained third place to achieve his sixth consecutive podium. In the second qualifying session, held under improving track conditions, Câmara secured pole again by setting his lap time last. Heavy rain before the second race led to a safety car start. Upon its withdrawal, Giusti executed an impressive restart from the third row, advancing to second place. A spin from Badoer brought the safety car back out, and on the next restart, Giusti moved into the lead. Câmara then fell down the order, ultimately finishing sixth. The race concluded with Strømsted and G4 Racing’s Kanato Le completing the podium. With Taponen failing to finish, Câmara extended his championship lead to 52 points.

In its return to Italy, the championship saw Câmara maintain an unbeaten streak in qualifying, securing pole position for the first race at Imola. However, after jumping the start, he received a five-second penalty, while Taponen advanced to second place, overtaking Giusti. Wharton also moved past Giusti before a safety car paused the race. With Taponen and Wharton then fighting over second behind, Câmara managed to extend his lead over the field and crossed the finish line eight seconds ahead, thus overcoming the time penalty. In the second race's qualifying, Câmara achieved his fourth consecutive pole position. Going into the first corner, Taponen rear-ended Câmara, resulting in the Finn's retirement and Câmara dropping to the back of the field. Giusti seized the lead, with Strømsted and David following, while Wharton later managed to take third during a restart. Giusti claimed victory, and Câmara executed an impressive comeback aided by ten retirements to finish ninth, solidifying a 61-point lead over Taponen.

=== Closing rounds ===
Wharton interrupted Câmara’s qualifying streak by securing pole position for the first race at the Red Bull Ring. Giusti challenged Wharton at the start, but Wharton held onto the lead, with Biliński moving into third place. This order remained unchanged during two safety car restarts, while Giltaire climbed through the field. On lap seven, Giltaire overtook Biliński for third and soon closed in on Giusti to secure second place. Despite him pressuring Wharton, the Australian prevailed and won the race. The following day, the track conditions were very wet, allowing Strømsted to claim pole position. The track then dried for the race, where Théophile Naël of Saintéloc Racing took the lead, followed by Strømsted and Badoer. Naël maintained his lead through multiple safety car periods and resisted a late challenge from Strømsted, who ran wide on the penultimate lap, allowing Naël to achieve his first victory. Câmara recorded two non-points finishes, but with Taponen failing to score himself, the points gap remained unchanged.

At the penultimate round in Barcelona, Wharton secured pole position for the first race. Câmara, starting alongside him, had a bad start and fell behind Taponen, enabling Wharton to establish an early lead. The Australian extended his advantage as Taponen defended second place from Câmara. The order at the front remained unchanged, with Wharton claiming victory by over six seconds, while Taponen's second-place finish kept his championship hopes alive for the time being. In the second race, Wharton once again started from pole, and an early safety car following a crash allowed him to maintain his lead. Taponen retired in the opening incident, ensuring Câmara's championship win. He had a quiet race, finishing fourth, while Wharton converted his second pole into another victory. Giusti and Clerot battled for second place behind, with the Frenchman successfully holding the Brazilian behind. Wharton’s two wins moved him ahead of Taponen in the standings, 60 points adrift of champion-elect Câmara.

The 2024 racing season concluded with a round at Monza Circuit, where Ugochukwu set the fastest qualifying time on a wet track. The first race, also in the wet, began behind the safety car. Ugochukwu quickly created a gap to Biliński, who came under pressure from Câmara. On lap four, Câmara overtook Biliński and began chasing Ugochukwu, while a multi-car battle for third place unfolded. Wharton emerged victorious in that fight, securing third place, as Câmara closed in on Ugochukwu but was unable to prevent him from claiming his maiden win. The final race of the season saw Naël on pole, but Câmara, starting third, made a strong start and took the lead. Giusti and Ugochukwu overtook Naël in the following laps before two safety car periods disrupted the race. After the first restart, Ugochukwu made a mistake that dropped him down the order, allowing Wharton to claim third place. An incident involving two simultaneous crashes led to a red flag, and the race was not resumed, securing Câmara his seventh win of the year.

At the conclusion of the season, Câmara secured the championship with seven victories, 309 points, and a 73-point lead over his nearest rival—records since the series adopted a two-race weekend format in 2021. Despite strong mid-season performances from Taponen and a late-season surge by Wharton, who scored the most points in the final four rounds, Câmara's dominance was rarely in question. He established a commanding lead early in the campaign and maintained consistent results, including multiple wins and podium finishes, to decisively outpace his competitors. His only significant setback occurred at the Red Bull Ring, but with Taponen unable to capitalize and Wharton’s rise coming too late, Câmara secured the title in the penultimate round. Meanwhile, the championship's appeal remained strong despite the departure of two teams and continued growth of other series such as Eurocup-3 and GB3, with grid sizes consistently exceeding 30 entries.

== Championship standings ==
Points system

Points were awarded to the top 10 classified finishers.

Position	**1st**	**2nd**	**3rd**	**4th**	**5th**	**6th**	**7th**	**8th**	**9th**	**10th**
Points	25	18	15	12	10	8	6	4	2	1

=== Drivers' standings ===
Pos.	Driver	HOC (Germany)		SPA (Belgium)		ZAN (Netherlands)		HUN (Hungary)		MUG (Italy)		LEC (France)		IMO (Italy)		RBR (Austria)		CAT (Spain)		MNZ (Italy)		Points
Pos.	Driver	R1	R2	R1	R2	R1	R2	R1	R2	R1	R2	R1	R2	R1	R2	R1	R2	R1	R2	R1	R2	Points
1	(Brazil) Rafael Câmara	**1**	2	1	**1**	2	**1**	3	6	5	5	**1**	**6**	**1**	**9**	11	16	3	4	2	1	309
2	(Australia) James Wharton	3	**Ret**	DNS	3	**13**	14	7	4	7	1	6	9	3	3	**1**	5	**1**	**1**	3	3	234
3	(Finland) Tuukka Taponen	2	9	13	5	1	6	**1**	**1**	**1**	4	5	Ret	2	Ret	12	Ret	2	Ret	9	Ret	198
4	(France) Alessandro Giusti	8	14	7	4	3	3	4	7	11	8	7	1	5	1	3	Ret	8	2	Ret	2	195
5	(Italy) Brando Badoer	4	5	8	10	10	2	2	2	2	**2**	3	Ret	6	11	7	3	4	17	11	Ret	174
6	(Denmark) Noah Strømsted	11	12	4	2	14	4	Ret	15	9	9	Ret	2	11	2	9	**2**	5	6	28†	10	121
7	(France) Evan Giltaire	Ret	1	12	6	5	11	5	13	22	21	8	4	14	Ret	2	11	15	12	5	11	97
8	(Brazil) Pedro Clerot	13	6	Ret	24	4	5	16	8	4	3	Ret	18	10	6	20	6	Ret	3	23†	Ret	93
9	(France) Théophile Naël	Ret	7	11	7	17	13	DSQ	9	23	14	11	14	7	8	13	1	6	11	4	**4**	81
10	(Portugal) Ivan Domingues	5	3	17	27	7	7	11	17	3	7	4	8	Ret	16	18	10	10	10	13	15	77
11	(United States) Ugo Ugochukwu	7	Ret	15	21	28	10	9	3	10	13	DSQ	DSQ	15	5	8	20	Ret	8	**1**	7	74
12	(France) Enzo Deligny	10	4	9	8	6	12	15	5	18	17	19	5	4	Ret	16	Ret	12	9	15	16	61
13	(France) Enzo Peugeot	16	24	6	9	9	8	6	24	16	11	12	23	Ret	Ret	5	12	7	7	8	5	60
14	(Malta) Zachary David	Ret	16	3	12	8	18	8	12	12	6	16	7	27	4	Ret	9	21	13	14	8	55
15	(United Kingdom) Roman Biliński	9	11	**2**	29†									9	7	4	8	9	Ret	7	26	52
16	(Italy) Nikita Bedrin	6	8			11	9			8	16			Ret	10	15	7	20	21	17	6	33
17	(Italy) Matteo De Palo	15	13	5	11	Ret	Ret	DSQ	10	19	18	10	15	8	Ret	10	4	22	Ret	25†	Ret	29
18	(United Kingdom) Kanato Le	19	Ret	20	20	12	15	17	16	17	19	17	3	16	Ret	19	15	14	5	16	9	27
19	(Kyrgyzstan) Michael Belov							13	11	6	12	2	Ret									26
20	(Italy) Valerio Rinicella	14	20	14	14	Ret	27	12	19	15	15	13	12	13	19	6	Ret	13	15	6	12	16
21	(Italy) Nicola Lacorte	18	10	16	13	18	16	14	Ret	20	20	9	16	19	13	22	21	16	16	Ret	14	3
22	(India) Nikhil Bohra	12	22	10	17	15	19	18	14	21	26	15	11	18	Ret	24	19	19	Ret	10	13	2
23	(China) Ruiqi Liu	17	18	18	18	25	23	10	18	13	10	14	17	17	18	Ret	18	18	Ret	24†	18	2
24	(Italy) Giovanni Maschio	20	15	Ret	16	19	21	19	20	Ret	23	26	10	21	Ret	14	13	17	22	Ret	17	1
25	(France) Romain Andriolo	21	17	Ret	Ret	21	Ret	20	Ret	24	22	20	26	24	15	21	Ret	11	14	19	Ret	0
26	(Thailand) Nandhavud Bhirombhakdi	27	21	26	Ret	26	25	26	26	14	Ret	Ret	Ret	12	12	Ret	Ret	23	27	12	19	0
27	(France) Doriane Pin	23	23	22	WD					26	24	Ret	13	25	Ret	17	17	24	20	21	25	0
28	(Spain) Marta García	24	25	21	15	24	22	21	Ret	31	27	18	20	23	17	23	14	29	24	20	24	0
29	(Netherlands) Maya Weug													22	14							0
30	(United Kingdom) John Bennett					16	Ret															0
31	(France) Edgar Pierre	29	Ret	28†	19	22	17	22	21	25	25	Ret	19	20	Ret	DNS	Ret	25	19	18	22	0
32	(Vietnam) Alex Sawer	25	Ret	24	28†	23	24	23	22	28	32†	21	21			WD	WD	26	18	26†	20	0
33	(Mexico) Jesse Carrasquedo Jr.	22	19	23	23	20	20	25	23													0
34	(Australia) Costa Toparis	28	Ret	19	22																	0
35	(Ukraine) Yaroslav Veselaho	Ret	26	25	26	29	28	24	28	27	29	23	28	26	20	Ret	WD	DNS	26	22	23	0
36	(United States) Jett Bowling																	27	25	27†	21	0
37	(Brazil) Álvaro Cho									29	30	22	24									0
38	(Switzerland) Léna Bühler	26	Ret	27	25	27	26	Ret	25	Ret	28	DNS	22									0
39	(United States) Enzo Scionti																	28	23			0
40	(China) Gao Yujia							Ret	27	30	31	24	25									0
41	(United Kingdom) Isaac Barashi							27	Ret			25	27									0
Pos.	Driver	R1	R2	R1	R2	R1	R2	R1	R2	R1	R2	R1	R2	R1	R2	R1	R2	R1	R2	R1	R2	Points
Pos.	Driver	HOC (Germany)		SPA (Belgium)		ZAN (Netherlands)		HUN (Hungary)		MUG (Italy)		LEC (France)		IMO (Italy)		RBR (Austria)		CAT (Spain)		MNZ (Italy)		Points

Colour	Result
Gold	Winner
Silver	Second place
Bronze	Third place
Green	Points classification
Blue	Non-points classification
Blue	Non-classified finish (NC)
Purple	Retired, not classified (Ret)
Red	Did not qualify (DNQ)
Red	Did not pre-qualify (DNPQ)
Black	Disqualified (DSQ)
White	Did not start (DNS)
White	Withdrew (WD)
White	Race cancelled (C)
Blank	Did not practice (DNP)
Blank	Did not arrive (DNA)
Blank	Excluded (EX)

**Bold** – Pole

Italics – Fastest Lap

† — Did not finish, but classified

Rookie

=== Teams' standings ===
For teams entering more than two cars, only the two best-finishing cars were eligible to score points in the teams' championship.

Pos.	Team	HOC (Germany)		SPA (Belgium)		ZAN (Netherlands)		HUN (Hungary)		MUG (Italy)		LEC (France)		IMO (Italy)		RBR (Austria)		CAT (Spain)		MNZ (Italy)		Points
Pos.	Team	R1	R2	R1	R2	R1	R2	R1	R2	R1	R2	R1	R2	R1	R2	R1	R2	R1	R2	R1	R2	Points
1	(Italy) Prema Racing	**1**	2	1	**1**	2	**1**	3	3	5	1	**1**	**6**	**1**	3	**1**	5	**1**	**1**	**1**	1	575
1	(Italy) Prema Racing	3	**Ret**	15	3	13	10	6	4	7	5	6	9	3	5	8	16	3	4	2	3	575
2	(France) R-ace GP	2	4	3	5	1	6	**1**	**1**	**1**	4	5	5	2	4	12	9	2	9	9	8	312
2	(France) R-ace GP	10	9	9	8	6	12	7	5	12	6	16	7	4	Ret	16	Ret	12	13	14	16	312
3	(Netherlands) Van Amersfoort Racing	4	3	8	10	4	2	2	2	2	**2**	3	8	6	6	7	3	4	3	11	15	311
3	(Netherlands) Van Amersfoort Racing	5	5	17	24	10	5	10	8	3	3	4	18	10	11	18	6	10	10	13	Ret	311
4	(France) ART Grand Prix	8	1	7	4	3	3	4	7	11	8	7	1	5	1	2	11	8	2	5	2	292
4	(France) ART Grand Prix	26	14	12	6	5	11	5	13	22	21	8	4	14	20	3	Ret	15	12	22	11	292
5	(France) Saintéloc Racing	15	7	5	7	9	8	DSQ	9	16	11	10	14	7	8	5	1	6	7	4	4	162
5	(France) Saintéloc Racing	16	13	6	9	17	13	DSQ	10	19	14	11	15	8	Ret	10	4	7	11	8	5	162
6	(Italy) RPM	11	12	4	2	14	4	18	15	9	9	26	2	11	2	9	**2**	5	6	18	10	122
6	(Italy) RPM	20	15	28†	16	19	17	21	20	25	23	Ret	10	20	Ret	14	13	17	19	25†	17	122
7	(Italy) Trident	9	10	**2**	13	18	16	9	11	6	10	2	16	9	7	4	8	9	16	7	14	84
7	(Italy) Trident	17	11	16	18	25	23	12	18	13	12	9	17	17	13	22	18	16	Ret	24†	19	84
8	(Netherlands) MP Motorsport	6	8	10	14	11	9	11	14	8	15	13	11	13	10	6	7	13	15	6	6	51
8	(Netherlands) MP Motorsport	12	20	14	17	15	19	17	19	15	16	15	12	18	19	15	19	19	21	10	12	51
9	(Switzerland) G4 Racing	19	17	20	20	12	15	16	16	17	19	18	3	16	15	19	15	11	5	16	9	27
9	(Switzerland) G4 Racing	21	19	23	23	20	20	19	23	24	22	20	24	24	Ret	21	Ret	14	14	19	24	27
10	(Finland) KIC Motorsport	25	21	19	22	16	24	22	22	14	31	21	21	12	12	Ret	Ret	23	18	12	21	0
10	(Finland) KIC Motorsport	27	Ret	24	28†	23	25	25	26	28	32	24	25	22	14	WD	WD	26	23	27†	23	0
11	(Italy) Iron Dames	23	23	21	15	24	22	20	Ret	26	24	19	13	23	17	17	14	24	20	20	20	0
11	(Italy) Iron Dames	24	25	22	WD					31	27	Ret	20	25	Ret	23	17	29	24	21	25	0
Pos.	Team	R1	R2	R1	R2	R1	R2	R1	R2	R1	R2	R1	R2	R1	R2	R1	R2	R1	R2	R1	R2	Points
Pos.	Team	HOC (Germany)		SPA (Belgium)		ZAN (Netherlands)		HUN (Hungary)		MUG (Italy)		LEC (France)		IMO (Italy)		RBR (Austria)		CAT (Spain)		MNZ (Italy)		Points
