= 2027 Formula 2 Championship =

Motor racing championship held in 2027

The 2027 FIA Formula 2 Championship is a planned motor racing championship for Formula 2 cars that will be sanctioned by the Fédération Internationale de l'Automobile (FIA). The championship will be the seventeenth season of Formula 2 racing and the eleventh season run under the FIA Formula 2 Championship moniker. Formula 2 is an open-wheel racing category serving as the second tier of formula racing in the FIA Global Pathway. The category will be run in support of selected rounds of the 2027 Formula One World Championship. As the championship is a spec series, all teams and drivers competing in the championship will run the same car, the Dallara F2 2024.

== Entries ==
As the championship is a spec series, all teams compete with an identical Dallara F2 2024 chassis, updated for the 2027-29 seasons, using a V6 turbo engine developed by Mecachrome. All teams compete with tyres supplied by Pirelli.

Team	No.	Driver	Rounds
(France) ART Grand Prix	TBA	(Finland) Tuukka Taponen	TBA
(France) ART Grand Prix	TBA	TBA	TBA
(Spain) Campos Racing	TBA	(United States) Ugo Ugochukwu	TBA
(Spain) Campos Racing	TBA	TBA	TBA
(France) DAMS Lucas Oil	TBA	(Colombia) Sebastián Montoya	TBA
(France) DAMS Lucas Oil	TBA	TBA	TBA
(United Kingdom) Hitech	TBA	(Paraguay) Joshua Dürksen	TBA
(United Kingdom) Hitech	TBA	(Poland) Roman Bilinski	TBA
(United Kingdom) Invicta Racing	TBA	(United Kingdom) Freddie Slater	TBA
(United Kingdom) Invicta Racing	TBA	(Denmark) Noah Strømsted	TBA
(Italy) LN4 Fusion	TBA	(Germany) Oliver Goethe	TBA
(Italy) LN4 Fusion	TBA	TBA	TBA
(Netherlands) MP Motorsport	TBA	(Netherlands) Laurens van Hoepen	TBA
(Netherlands) MP Motorsport	TBA	TBA	TBA
(Italy) Prema Racing	TBA	(Italy) Nicola Lacorte	TBA
(Italy) Prema Racing	TBA	TBA	TBA
(New Zealand) Rodin Motorsport	TBA	(Italy) Brando Badoer	TBA
(New Zealand) Rodin Motorsport	TBA	TBA	TBA
(Italy) Trident	TBA	(Australia) James Wharton	TBA
(Italy) Trident	TBA	TBA	TBA
(Netherlands) Van Amersfoort Racing	TBA	TBA	TBA
(Netherlands) Van Amersfoort Racing	TBA	TBA	TBA

=== Team changes ===
LN4 Fusion, a new team co-founded by Formula One driver Lando Norris and British karting team Fusion Motorsport, has acquired assets of AIX Racing and will join the Formula 2 Championship.

=== Driver changes ===
Invicta Racing will have an all-new driver lineup as Rafael Câmara graduated to Formula One with the TGR Haas F1 Team and Joshua Dürksen moved to Hitech. The team signed two graduates from Trident's FIA Formula 3 outfit: 2026 runner-up and Audi Driver Development Programme driver Freddie Slater and Noah Strømsted, who finished tenth.

Hitech also renewed their lineup: Mercedes development driver Joshua Dürksen replaced Ritomo Miyata for his fourth F2 season, and Roman Bilinski moves over from DAMS Lucas Oil to drive his sophomore season in place of Colton Herta.

Campos Racing promoted 2026 FIA F3 Champion Ugo Ugochukwu from their FIA F3 outfit.

DAMS Lucas Oil replaced Hitech-bound Bilinski with Sebastián Montoya, who departs Prema Racing for his third F2 season.

MP Motorsport signed Laurens van Hoepen for his second F2 season to replace LN4-bound Goethe.

Prema Racing replaced DAMS-bound Montoya with FIA F3 graduate Nicola Lacorte, who steps up after finishing the 2026 season in 19th with DAMS Lucas Oil.

Rodin Motorsport promoted Brando Badoer from their FIA F3 outfit, where he finished the 2026 season in eighth.

ART Grand Prix signed Ferrari Driver Academy member Tuukka Taponen, who steps up from FIA F3 after finishing the 2026 season in third with MP Motorsport.

Trident saw Laurens van Hoepen move to MP Motorsport. The team signed James Wharton, who made a one-off appearance for the team in the Lusail round of the 2025 season, for his full-season debut. Wharton graduates from FIA F3, where he finished the 2026 season in 17th driving for Prema Racing.

New team LN4 Fusion signed Oliver Goethe, who departs MP Motorsport for his third full season in the championship.

== Race calendar ==
Round	Circuit	Sprint race	Feature race
1	Bahrain International Circuit, Sakhir	13 March	14 March
2	(Saudi Arabia) Jeddah Corniche Circuit, Jeddah	20 March	21 March
3	(Australia) Albert Park Circuit, Melbourne	3 April	4 April
4	(Canada) Circuit Gilles Villeneuve, Montreal	22 May	23 May
5	Circuit de Monaco, Monaco	5 June	6 June
6	(United Kingdom) Silverstone Circuit, Silverstone	3 July	4 July
7	(Austria) Red Bull Ring, Spielberg	10 July	11 July
8	(Italy) Monza Circuit, Monza	4 September	5 September
9	(Spain) Madring, Madrid	11 September	12 September
10	(Azerbaijan) Baku City Circuit, Baku	25 September	26 September
11	(Turkey) Istanbul Park, Istanbul	2 October	3 October
12	Autódromo Hermanos Rodríguez, Mexico City	30 October	31 October
13	(Qatar) Lusail International Circuit, Lusail	4 December	5 December
14	(United Arab Emirates) Yas Marina Circuit, Abu Dhabi	11 December	12 December

=== Calendar changes ===
- The Bahrain and Saudi Arabian Grand Prix, at the Bahrain International Circuit and the Jeddah Corniche Circuit, respectively, will return to the calendar after the 2026 rounds were cancelled due to the Iran war.
- Formula 2 will make its debut in Turkey and Mexico, supporting the Turkish and Mexico City Grand Prix at Istanbul Park and Autódromo Hermanos Rodríguez, respectively.
- The rounds at the Circuit de Spa-Francorchamps and the Hungaroring, supporting the Belgian and Hungarian Grand Prix, respectively, were removed from the calendar. Formula 2 will also not race Circuit de Barcelona-Catalunya as the corresponding Grand Prix will not be held in 2027, and the 2026 one-off round at Miami International Autodrome supporting the Miami Grand Prix will also not return.

== Regulation changes ==
The Dallara F2 2024 chassis introduced in the 2024 season will receive an updated aerodynamics package featuring redesigned front and rear wings. The upgrade will also introduce an onboard starting system to allow drivers to restart stalled cars on their own.

Both Formula 2 and Formula 3 will introduce 100% sustainable fuels.

== Results and standings ==
=== Scoring system ===
Points are awarded to the top eight classified finishers in the sprint race, and to the top ten classified finishers in the feature race. (Note: In the event of a race ending prematurely, the number of points-paying positions may be reduced, depending on how much of the race has been completed.) The pole-sitter in the feature race also receives two points, and one point is given to the driver who set the fastest lap in both the feature and sprint races, provided that driver finished inside the top ten. If the driver who set the fastest lap is classified outside the top ten, the point is given to the driver who set the fastest lap of those inside the top ten. No extra points are awarded to the pole-sitter in the sprint race as the grid for it is set by reversing the top ten qualifiers.

Sprint race points

Points are awarded to the top eight classified finishers, excluding the fastest lap point which is given to the top ten classified finishers.

Position	1st	2nd	3rd	4th	5th	6th	7th	8th	FL
Points	10	8	6	5	4	3	2	1	1

Feature race points

Points are awarded to the top ten classified finishers. Bonus points are awarded to the pole-sitter and to the driver who set the fastest lap and finished in the top ten.

Position	1st	2nd	3rd	4th	5th	6th	7th	8th	9th	10th	Pole	FL
Points	25	18	15	12	10	8	6	4	2	1	2	1
