= Brando Badoer =

Italian racing driver (born 2006)

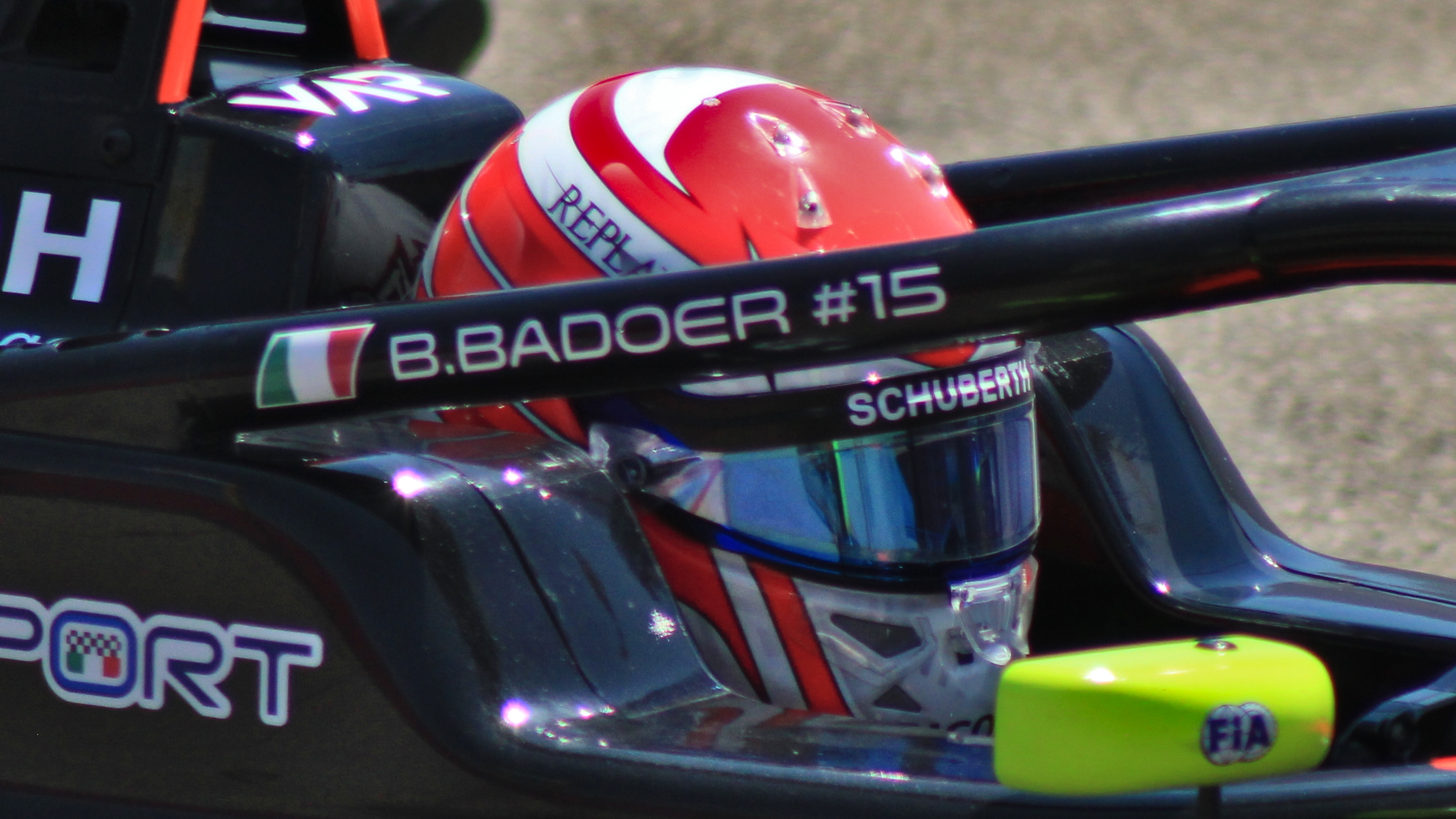
- Badoer in 2024
- Nationality: (Italy) Italian
- Born: 15 September 2006 (age 20) Montebelluna, Veneto, Italy
- Relatives: Luca Badoer (father)

FIA Formula 3 Championship career
- Debut season: 2025
- Current team: Rodin Motorsport
- Car number: 18
- Former teams: Prema Racing
- Starts: 38
- Wins: 1
- Podiums: 4
- Poles: 0
- Fastest laps: 0
- Best finish: 8th in 2026

Previous series
- 2025–2026; 2024; 2024–2025; 2023; 2022–2023; 2022 2022: FIA Formula 3; FR European; FR Middle East; Euro 4; Italian F4; ADAC Formula 4; F4 UAE
- Statistics up to date as of 8 October 2026.

Brando Badoer (born 15 September 2006) is an Italian racing driver who is set to compete in the FIA Formula 2 Championship for Rodin Motorsport.

Badoer is the son of former Formula One driver Luca Badoer. He competed for PHM Racing in the 2025 Formula Regional Middle East Championship, in which he finished fourth, and for Van Amersfoort Racing in the 2024 Formula Regional European Championship, in which he finished fifth. He previously competed in Italian F4 in 2022 and 2023.

Badoer was part of the McLaren Driver Development Programme from 2024 to 2025.

== Personal life ==
Born on 15 September 2006 in Montebelluna, Italy, Badoer is the son of former Formula 1 and Ferrari test driver Luca Badoer. He grew up deeply immersed in motorsport, which sparked his early passion for racing. After his karting foundation, he drew attention from the Ferrari Driver Academy and was invited to their ACI summer scouting camp, where he trained alongside Andrea Kimi Antonelli.

Badoer completed his final year of high school in 2025 during his rookie Formula 3 campaign. Outside of racing, he has an interest in the stock market and follows financial topics. He also trains in high-performance KZ karts between race events.

== Career ==
=== Karting ===
Badoer began competing in WSK events in 2017 with Baby Race. In 2018, he stayed in 60 Mini but switched teams to Parolin, finishing second in the WSK Open Cup, third in the WSK Champions Cup, and fourth in the WSK Final Cup. For 2019 and 2020, he competed in OK-Junior, finishing third overall in the 2020 WSK Super Master Series and second in the WSK Euro Series the same year. He then spent 2021 in the OK and KZ2 classes, but struggled to produce the same results, a highlight being an OK-class podium in the opening round of the WSK Euro Series.

=== Formula 4 ===
==== 2022 ====
Badoer made his single-seater debut in the 2022 Formula 4 UAE Championship with AKM Motorsport. He failed to score any points and placed 28th in the standings.

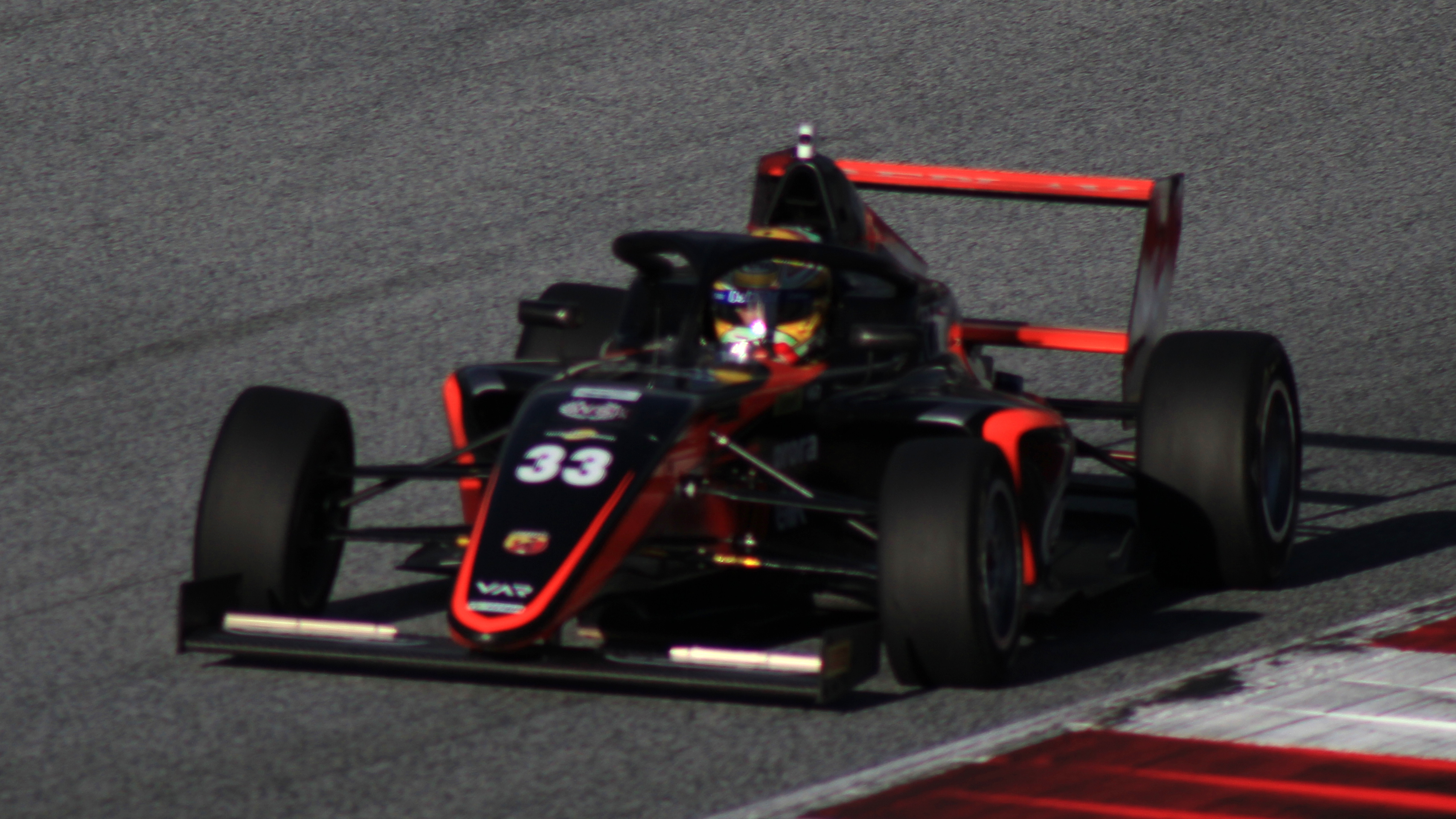
Badoer racing at the Red Bull Ring during the 2022 Italian F4 Championship.

For his main campaign, Badoer would race in the Italian F4 Championship with Van Amersfoort Racing. He had a difficult first half of the season, failing to score points but broke through with a fifth place in Spielberg, and score a few more points that season to end 16th in the standings. He also competed as a guest driver in ADAC Formula 4 in two rounds.

In September 2022, Badoer was chosen to participate in a scouting camp conducted by the Ferrari Driver Academy.

==== 2023 ====
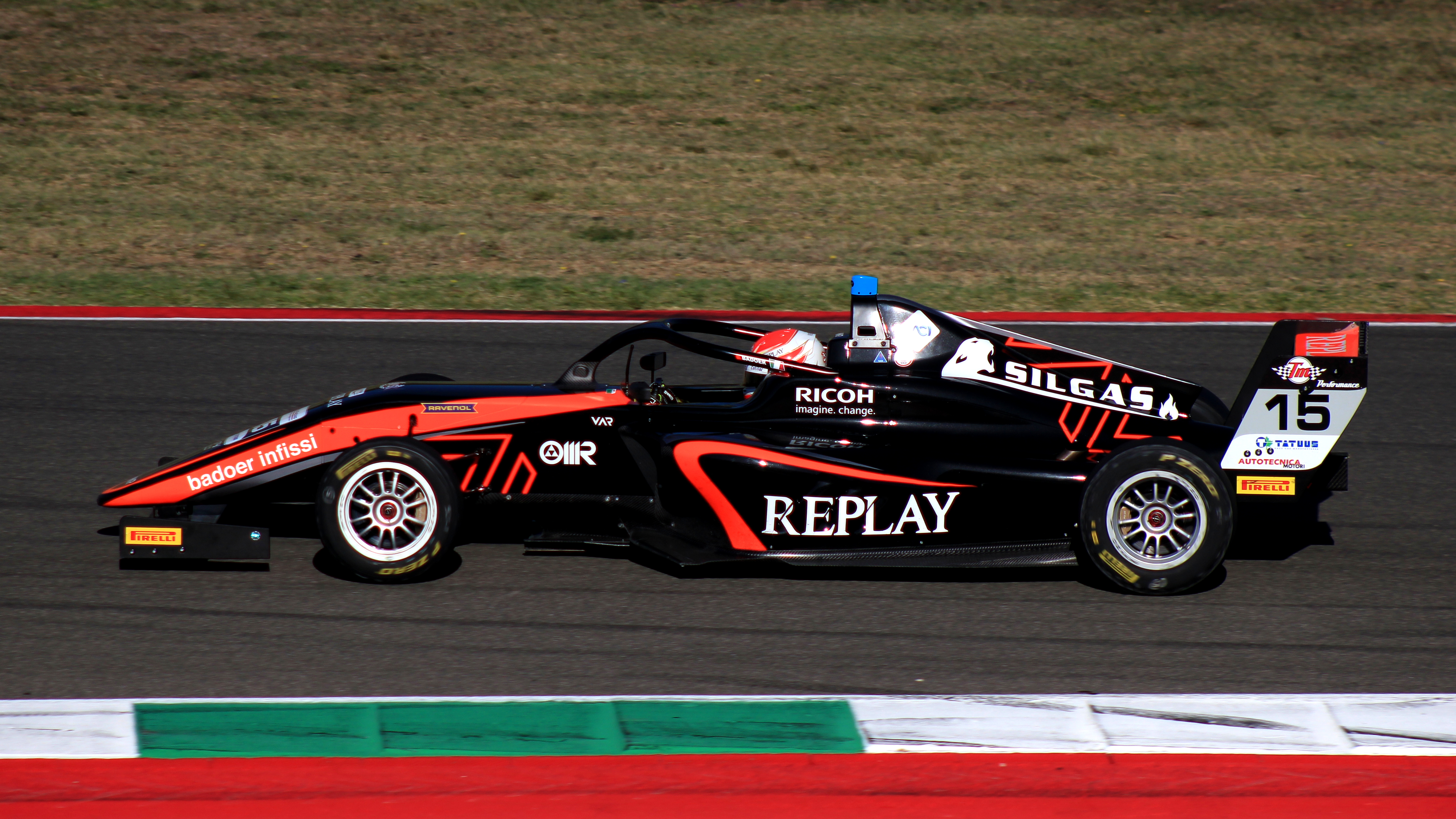
Badoer racing in the 2023 Italian F4 Championship at the Mugello Circuit.

Badoer raced in the 2023 Formula 4 UAE Championship with Pinnacle VAR during pre-season. He took his maiden single-seater podium with third at the Dubai Autodrome. Despite not being present in two of five rounds of the championship, Badoer was sixth in the overall standings.

Badoer remained with Van Amersfoort Racing in Italian F4. His season would be much more improved that the year before, starting out with a second place in Imola. He scored four more podiums throughout the season with consistent points finishes, including a pole position in Monza. This placed him sixth in the championship standings.

Badoer also competed with Van Amersfoort Racing in the inaugural Euro 4 Championship. He took three podiums over the nine races, once again finishing sixth in the overall standings.

=== Formula Regional ===
==== 2024 ====
During pre-season, Badoer would compete in the 2024 Formula Regional Middle East Championship with PHM AIX Racing. He achieved three podiums, putting him tenth in the standings.

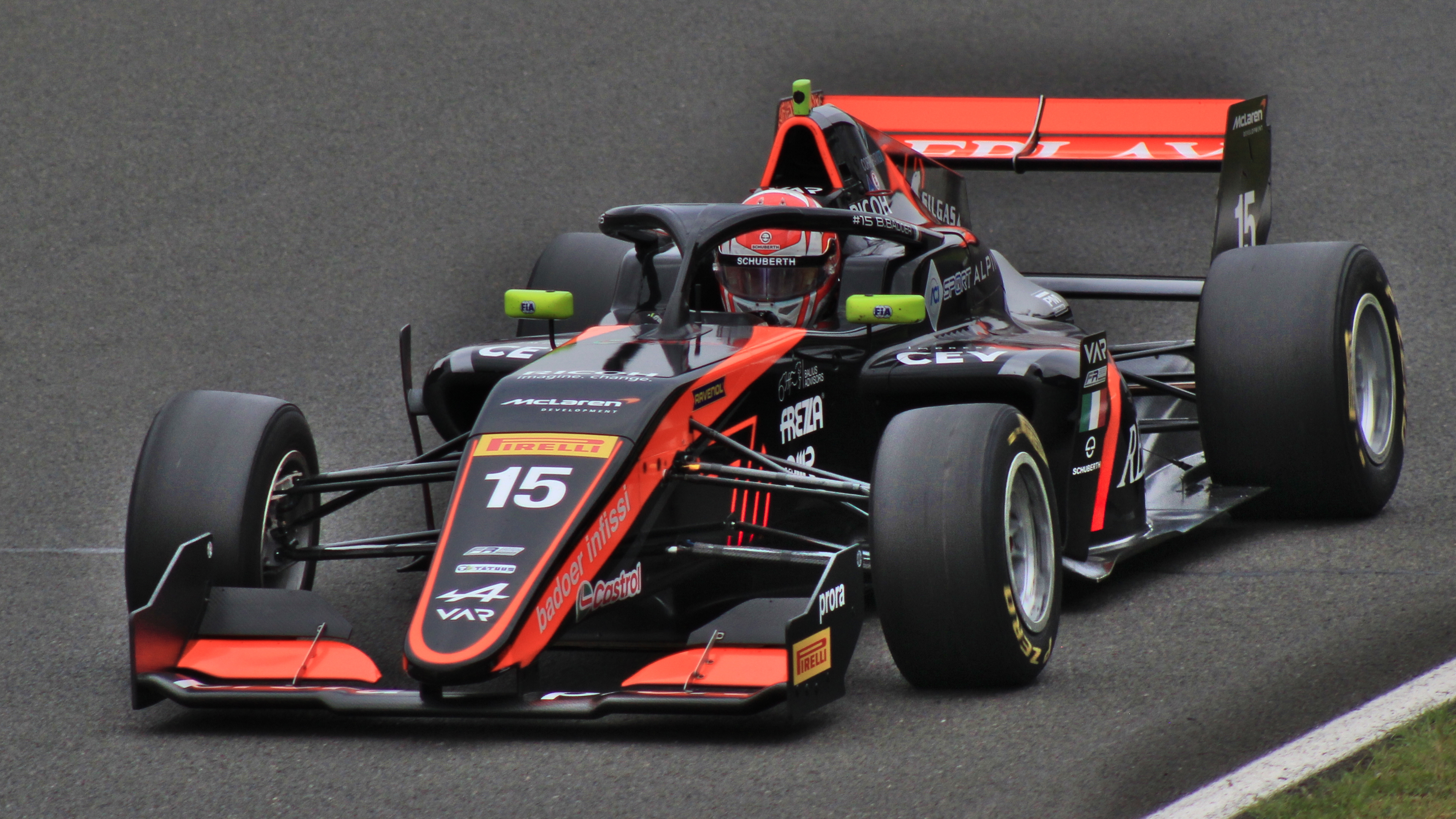
Badoer racing at the Hungaroring during the 2024 Formula Regional European Championship

Badoer would move up to the Formula Regional European Championship, continuing with Van Amersfoort Racing. Badoer had a strong start to his campaign with fourth and fifth place in the Hockenheim opener, and soon took his first podium with second place in Zandvoort. This was a start of five consecutive second places, which included a maiden pole position in Mugello. In the remaining four rounds, Badoer collected only one more podium in Austria, and failed to score in the last three races. Despite placing as the highest winless driver in the standings, Badoer managed to finish fifth in the championship with six podiums and 174 points.

==== 2025 ====
In preparation for his 2025 Formula 3 campaign, Badoer returned to the Formula Regional Middle East Championship with PHM Racing. He took his maiden Formula Regional victory in the second of the Yas Marina rounds, winning the reverse-grid race two. With three further podiums, he finished fourth in the overall standings.

=== FIA Formula 3 ===
==== 2025 ====
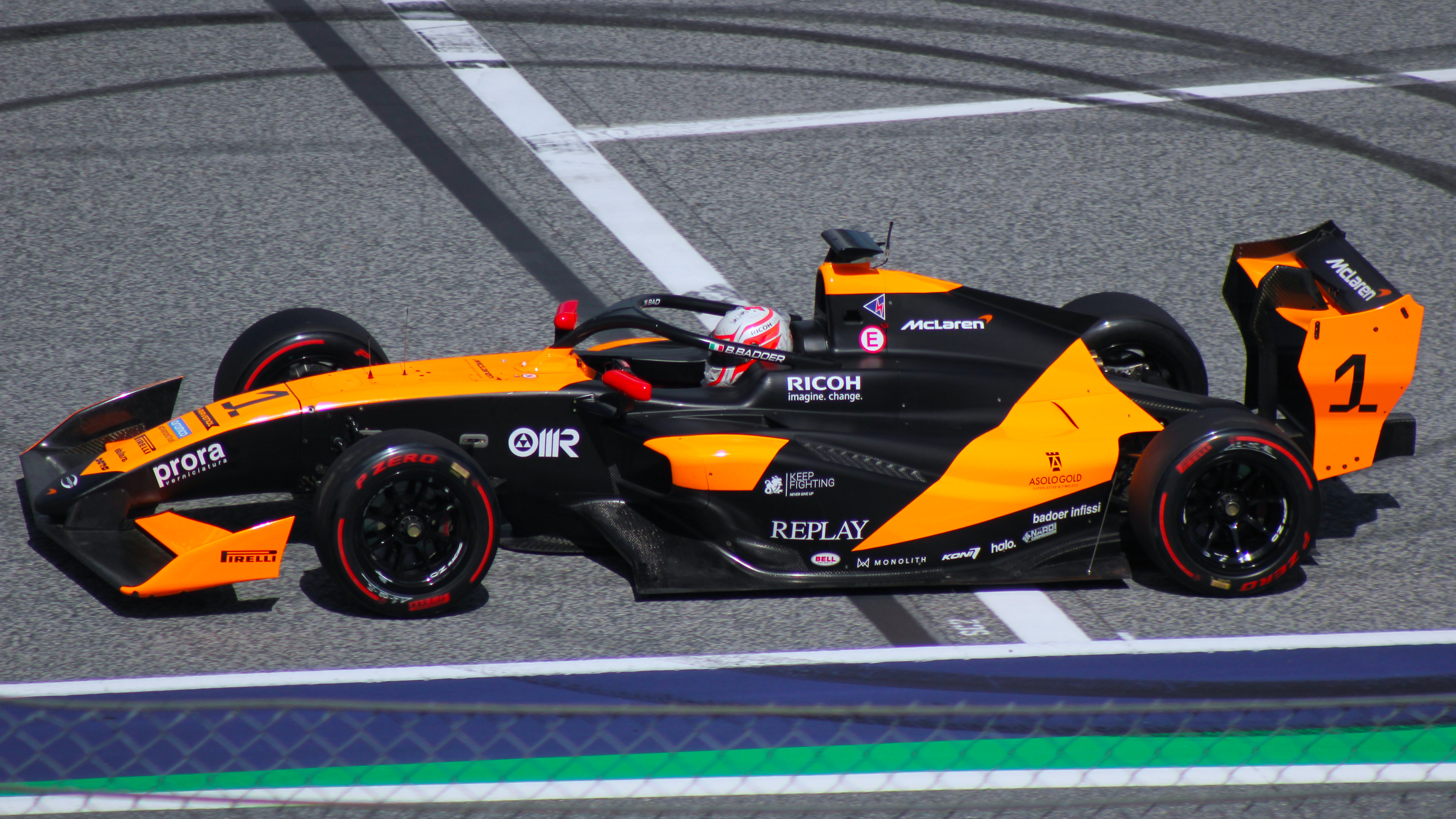
Badoer driving the Dallara F3 2025 during the 2025 Spielberg Formula 3 round

In October 2024, Badoer was announced to be competing for Prema Racing in the 2025 FIA Formula 3 Championship alongside Noel León and Ugo Ugochukwu. The beginning of the season was difficult, with Badoer failing to score in the first two rounds. Overall, he had a dismal season, scoring only thirteen points and placing twenty-fifth in the standings.

==== 2026 ====
Badoer switched to Rodin Motorsport for his sophomore season of Formula 3 in 2026. He started the season by finishing third in the truncated Melbourne sprint race, having passed Noah Strømsted at the start. Badoer qualified second at Monaco, before passing polesitter Théophile Naël off the line and going on to win the feature race.

=== FIA Formula 2 ===
Badoer will move up to Formula 2 in 2027, remaining with Rodin Motorsport for the second consecutive year.

=== Formula One ===
In October 2023, Badoer was made an optioned driver of the McLaren Driver Development Programme for the duration of one year. This option was later exercised in October 2024 seeing him join the McLaren Driver Development Programme. However, he left the programme after just a year in November 2025.

== Racing record ==
=== Racing career summary ===
Season	Series	Team	Races	Wins	Poles	F/Laps	Podiums	Points	Position
2022	Formula 4 UAE Championship	AKM Motorsport	16	0	0	0	0	0	28th
2022	Italian F4 Championship	Van Amersfoort Racing	20	0	0	0	0	14	16th
2022	ADAC Formula 4 Championship	Van Amersfoort Racing	6	0	0	0	0	0	NC†
2023	Formula 4 UAE Championship	Pinnacle VAR	9	0	0	1	1	69	6th
2023	Italian F4 Championship	Van Amersfoort Racing	21	0	1	3	5	165	6th
2023	Euro 4 Championship	Van Amersfoort Racing	8	0	0	0	3	88.5	6th
2024	Formula Regional Middle East Championship	PHM AIX Racing	15	0	0	0	3	76	10th
2024	Formula Regional European Championship	Van Amersfoort Racing	20	0	1	2	7	174	5th
2025	Formula Regional Middle East Championship	PHM Racing	15	1	0	0	4	156	4th
2025	FIA Formula 3 Championship	Prema Racing	19	0	0	0	0	13	25th
2026	FIA Formula 3 Championship	Rodin Motorsport	19	1	0	0	4	71	8th
2027	FIA Formula 2 Championship	Rodin Motorsport	0	0	0	0	0	0	TBD

^{*} Season still in progress.
^{†} As Badoer was a guest driver, he was ineligible for championship points.

=== Complete Formula 4 UAE Championship results ===
(key) (Races in bold indicate pole position) (Races in italics indicate fastest lap)

Year	Team	1	2	3	4	5	6	7	8	9	10	11	12	13	14	15	16	17	18	19	20	Pos	Points
2022	AKM Motorsport	YMC1; 1 Ret	YMC1; 2; 23†	YMC1; 3; 17	YMC1; 4; 23	DUB1; 1; 20	DUB1; 2 Ret	DUB1; 3; 25	DUB1; 4; 12	DUB2; 1; 25	DUB2; 2; 14	DUB2; 3; 15	DUB2; 4; 25	DUB3; 1; 13	DUB3; 2; 14	DUB3; 3; 14	DUB3; 4; 16	YMC2; 1	YMC2; 2	YMC2; 3	YMC2; 4	28th	0
2023	Pinnacle VAR	DUB1; 1; 5	DUB1; 2; 5	DUB1; 3; 6	KMT1; 1	KMT1; 2	KMT1; 3	KMT2; 1	KMT2; 2	KMT2; 3	DUB2; 1; 3	DUB2; 2; 13	DUB2; 3; 8	YMC; 1; 4	YMC; 2 Ret	YMC; 3; 5						6th	69

=== Complete ADAC Formula 4 Championship results ===
(key) (Races in bold indicate pole position) (Races in italics indicate fastest lap)

Year	Team	1	2	3	4	5	6	7	8	9	10	11	12	13	14	15	16	17	18	DC	Points
2022	Van Amersfoort Racing	SPA; 1	SPA; 2	SPA; 3	HOC; 1; 9	HOC; 2; 7	HOC; 3; 10	ZAN; 1; 18	ZAN; 2; 16	ZAN; 3; 11	NÜR1; 1	NÜR1; 2	NÜR1; 3	LAU; 1	LAU; 2	LAU; 3	NÜR2; 1	NÜR2; 2	NÜR2; 3	NC†	0

^{†} As Badoer was a guest driver, he was ineligible to score points.

=== Complete Italian F4 Championship results ===
(key) (Races in bold indicate pole position) (Races in italics indicate fastest lap)

Year	Team	1	2	3	4	5	6	7	8	9	10	11	12	13	14	15	16	17	18	19	20	21	22	DC	Points
2022	Van Amersfoort Racing	IMO; 1 Ret	IMO; 2; 32†	IMO; 3; 20	MIS; 1; 13	MIS; 2; 13	MIS; 3; 14	SPA; 1; 11	SPA; 2; 20	SPA; 3; 11	VLL; 1; 21	VLL; 2 Ret	VLL; 3; 13	RBR; 1; 5	RBR; 2; 10	RBR; 3	RBR; 4; 21	MNZ; 1 Ret	MNZ; 2; 13	MNZ; 3 C	MUG; 1; 10	MUG; 2; 13	MUG; 3; 9	16th	14
2023	Van Amersfoort Racing	IMO; 1; 2	IMO; 2	IMO; 3; 4	IMO; 4; 27†	MIS; 1; 5	MIS; 2; 8	MIS; 3 Ret	SPA; 1; 3	SPA; 2 Ret	SPA; 3; 4	**MNZ**; **1**; 2	MNZ; 2; 3	MNZ; 3 Ret	LEC; 1; 7	LEC; 2 Ret	LEC; 3; 4	MUG; 1; 7	MUG; 2; 32†	MUG; 3; 6	VLL; 1; 8	VLL; 2; 3	VLL; 3; 5	6th	165

=== Complete Euro 4 Championship results ===
(key) (Races in bold indicate pole position; races in italics indicate fastest lap)

Year	Team	1	2	3	4	5	6	7	8	9	DC	Points
2023	Van Amersfoort Racing	MUG; 1; 9	MUG; 2 DNS	MUG; 3; 10	MNZ; 1; 13	MNZ; 2; 3	MNZ; 3; 2	CAT; 1; 6	CAT; 2; 8	CAT; 3; 2	6th	88.5

=== Complete Formula Regional Middle East Championship results ===
(key) (Races in bold indicate pole position) (Races in italics indicate fastest lap)

Year	Entrant	1	2	3	4	5	6	7	8	9	10	11	12	13	14	15	DC	Points
2024	PHM AIX Racing	YMC1; 1 Ret	YMC1; 2; 21	YMC1; 3; 11	YMC2; 1; 11	YMC2; 2; 8	YMC2; 3; 9	DUB1; 1; 7	DUB1; 2; 3	DUB1; 3; 3	YMC3; 1 Ret	YMC3; 2; 15	YMC3; 3; 7	DUB2; 1; 5	DUB2; 2; 25	DUB2; 3; 2	10th	76
2025	PHM Racing	YMC1; 1; 4	YMC1; 2; 5	YMC1; 3; 6	YMC2; 1; 10	YMC2; 2; 1	YMC2; 3; 2	DUB; 1; 2	DUB; 2; 9	DUB; 3; 7	YMC3; 1; 6	YMC3; 2; 3	YMC3; 3; 14	LUS; 1; 14	LUS; 2; 13	LUS; 3; 11	4th	156

=== Complete Formula Regional European Championship results ===
(key) (Races in bold indicate pole position) (Races in italics indicate fastest lap)

Year	Team	1	2	3	4	5	6	7	8	9	10	11	12	13	14	15	16	17	18	19	20	DC	Points
2024	Van Amersfoort Racing	HOC; 1; 4	HOC; 2; 5	SPA; 1; 8	SPA; 2; 10	ZAN; 1; 10	ZAN; 2; 2	HUN; 1; 2	HUN; 2; 2	MUG; 1; 2	**MUG**; **2**; 2	LEC; 1; 3	LEC; 2 Ret	IMO; 1; 6	IMO; 2; 11	RBR; 1; 7	RBR; 2; 3	CAT; 1; 4	CAT; 2; 17	MNZ; 1; 11	MNZ; 2 Ret	5th	174

=== Complete FIA Formula 3 Championship results ===
(key) (Races in bold indicate pole position) (Races in italics indicate fastest lap)

Year	Entrant	1	2	3	4	5	6	7	8	9	10	11	12	13	14	15	16	17	18	19	20	DC	Points
2025	Prema Racing	MEL; SPR; 19	MEL; FEA; 26	BHR; SPR; 22	BHR; FEA; 21	IMO; SPR; 16	IMO; FEA; 19	MON; SPR; 20	MON; FEA; Ret	CAT; SPR; 17	CAT; FEA; Ret	RBR; SPR; 23	RBR; FEA; Ret	SIL; SPR; Ret	SIL; FEA; 12	SPA; SPR; 9	SPA; FEA; C	HUN; SPR; 6	HUN; FEA; 7	MNZ; SPR; 27	MNZ; FEA; 14	25th	13
2026	Rodin Motorsport	MEL; SPR; 3	MEL; FEA; 16	MON; SPR; Ret	MON; FEA; 1	CAT; SPR; 10	CAT; FEA; 4	RBR; SPR; 21	RBR; FEA; 21	SIL; SPR; 19	SIL; FEA; 17	SPA; SPR; 2	SPA; FEA; 14	HUN; SPR; 5	HUN; FEA; 3	MNZ; SPR; 23	MNZ; FEA; 24	MAD; SPR; 21	MAD; FEA1; 17	MAD; FEA2; 11		8th	71

=== Complete FIA Formula 2 Championship results ===
(key) (Races in bold indicate pole position) (Races in italics indicate fastest lap)

Year	Entrant	1	2	3	4	5	6	7	8	9	10	11	12	13	14	15	16	17	18	19	20	21	22	23	24	25	26	27	28	DC	Points
2027	Rodin Motorsport	BHR; SPR	BHR; FEA	JED; SPR	JED; FEA	MEL; SPR	MEL; FEA	MTL; SPR	MTL; FEA	MON; SPR	MON; FEA	SIL; SPR	SIL; FEA	RBR; SPR	RBR; FEA	MNZ; SPR	MNZ; FEA	MAD; SPR	MAD; FEA	BAK; SPR	BAK; FEA	IST; SPR	IST; FEA	MXC; SPR	MXC; FEA	LSL; SPR	LSL; FEA	YMC; SPR	YMC; FEA	TBD	TBD
