= List of Formula Regional European Championship drivers =

This is a List of Formula Regional European Championship drivers, that is, a list of drivers who have made at least one race start in the Formula Regional European Championship, which was established in 2019.

This list is accurate up to and including the Monza round of the 2026 Formula Regional European Championship.

== By name ==
Key
Symbol	Meaning
*	Driver competed in the 2026 Monza FREC round (last round)
	Driver became Champion of the series
^{F2}	Driver has competed in the FIA Formula 2 Championship
~	Driver competed in the last Formula One race (the 2026 São Paulo Grand Prix)
^	Driver has competed in Formula One but not the last race

Name	License	Seasons	Championship titles	Entries	Starts	Poles	Wins	Podiums	Fastest Laps	Points
Alexander Abkhazava*	Kazakhstan	2026	0	11	10	0	0	1	0	44
Arthur Aegerter	France	2025	0	8	5	0	0	0	0	0
William Alatalo	Finland	2021–2022	0	22	22	0	0	1	0	91
Rahim Alibhai*	United States	2026	0	11	10	0	0	0	0	0
Rashid Al Dhaheri*	United Arab Emirates	2025–2026	0	31	29	1	2	8	4	211
Saqer Al-Maosherji*	Kuwait	2025–2026	0	29	27	0	0	0	0	3
Amna Al Qubaisi	United Arab Emirates	2022	0	4	4	0	0	0	0	0
Hamda Al Qubaisi	United Arab Emirates	2022	0	16	15	0	0	0	0	0
Marcus Amand	France	2023	0	20	20	1	0	1	0	26
Romain Andriolo	France	2024	0	20	20	0	0	0	0	0
Kimi Antonelli^{F2}~	Italy	2023	1(2023)	20	20	4	5	11	5	300
Kabir Anurag*	Singapore	2026	0	11	10	0	0	0	0	3
Pietro Armanni	Italy	2022	0	20	19	0	0	0	0	0
Paul Aron^{F2}	Estonia	2021–2022	0	40	39	9	8	15	5	435
Tereza Bábíčková	Czech Republic	2022	0	2	1	0	0	0	0	0
Brando Badoer	Italy	2024	0	20	20	1	0	7	2	174
Nicolás Baptiste	Colombia	2022	0	20	19	0	0	0	0	0
Isaac Barashi	United Kingdom	2024	0	4	4	0	0	0	0	0
Alexandre Bardinon	France	2019, 2021	0	42	39	0	0	0	0	5
Eduardo Barrichello	Brazil	2021–2022	0	40	39	0	0	1	0	51
Tom Beckhäuser	Czech Republic	2019	0	15	14	0	0	0	0	12
Nikita Bedrin	Italy (Note: Bedrin is a Russian racing driver who competed under an Italian racing license.)	2023–2025	0	38	38	0	0	3	0	105
Jack Beeton	Australia	2025	0	20	19	0	0	0	0	32
Dino Beganovic^{F2}	Sweden	2021–2022	1(2022)	40	40	5	4	13	4	353
Michael Belov	Russia/Neutral/Kyrgyzstan (Note: Belov is a Russian racing driver who competed as a neutral competitor in 2022 and under a Kyrgyz racing license from 2023 onwards.)	2021–2025	0	64	63	2	2	8	3	285
Brad Benavides^{F2}	Spain	2021	0	10	10	0	0	0	0	0
John Bennett^{F2}	United Kingdom	2024	0	2	2	0	0	0	0	0
Victor Bernier	France	2022–2023	0	38	37	0	0	2	0	62
Nandhavud Bhirombhakdi	Thailand	2024–2025	0	40	40	0	0	0	0	24
Roman Bilinski^{F2}	Poland/United Kingdom	2022–2024	0	52	52	1	0	2	0	92
Isac Blomqvist	Finland (Note: Blomqvist is a Swedish racing driver who competed under a Finnish racing license.)	2019	0	16	15	3	0	1	0	62
Akshay Bohra	India	2025	0	20	20	1	1	6	1	159
Nikhil Bohra	Singapore/India (Note: Bohra is an Indian and American driver who competed under a Singaporean licence in 2023 and competed under an Indian licence in 2024.)	2023–2024	0	40	40	0	0	1	0	58
Édouard Borgna	France	2025	0	20	20	0	0	0	0	0
Gabriel Bortoleto^{F2}~	Brazil	2021–2022	0	40	40	2	2	6	1	220
Jett Bowling	United States	2024	0	4	4	0	0	0	0	0
Mari Boya^{F2}	Spain	2021–2022	0	40	40	0	0	2	2	120
Francesco Braschi	Italy	2022	0	20	19	0	0	0	0	1
Léna Bühler	Switzerland	2021–2022, 2024	0	36	33	0	0	0	0	0
Olli Caldwell^{F2}	United Kingdom	2019	0	25	24	1	1	7	0	213
Rafael Câmara^{F2}	Brazil	2023–2024	1(2024)	40	40	10	9	17	8	482
Macéo Capietto	France	2022–2023, 2025	0	44	44	0	0	1	0	89
Jesse Carrasquedo Jr.	Mexico	2023–2024	0	12	12	0	0	0	0	0
Jamie Chadwick	United Kingdom	2020	0	24	23	0	0	1	0	80
Zhenrui Chi*	Italy (Note: Chi is a Chinese driver who competed under an Italian licence.)	2025–2026	0	15	14	0	0	0	0	47
Álvaro Cho	Brazil	2024	0	4	4	0	0	0	0	0
Pierre-Louis Chovet	France	2020, 2022–2023	0	32	31	1	1	7	3	244
Pedro Clerot	Brazil	2024–2025	0	40	40	3	2	9	1	328
Ido Cohen	Israel	2021	0	8	8	0	0	0	0	0
Andrea Cola	Italy	2020	0	18	14	0	0	0	0	26
Franco Colapinto^{F2}~	Argentina	2021	0	20	20	1	0	7	2	174
Miguel Costa*	Brazil	2026	0	11	10	0	0	0	0	4
Yuanpu Cui	China	2025	0	4	4	0	0	0	0	0
Kai Daryanani*	India	2026	0	11	10	0	0	0	0	10
Hadrien David	France	2021–2023	0	46	46	4	5	16	6	433
Zachary David	Malta (Note: David is a Filipino racing driver who competed under a Maltese racing license.)	2024–2025	0	26	26	0	0	1	0	55
Bruno del Pino	Spain	2023	0	2	2	0	0	0	0	0
Enzo Deligny	France	2024–2025	0	40	40	3	4	9	2	296
Pietro Delli Guanti	Italy	2021–2022	0	34	34	0	0	0	0	19
Matteo De Palo	Italy	2024–2025	0	40	40	3	4	11	2	306
Arias Deukmedjian	United States	2021	0	2	2	0	0	0	0	0
Ivan Domingues	Portugal	2023–2024	0	24	24	0	0	2	0	78
Keith Donegan	Ireland	2022	0	10	9	0	0	0	0	0
Joshua Dufek	Switzerland	2022–2023	0	32	31	1	0	3	0	131
Joshua Dürksen^{F2}	Paraguay	2022–2023	0	40	40	0	0	1	0	66
Andrea Dupé*	France	2026	0	11	10	0	0	1	0	8
James Egozi	United States	2025	0	4	4	0	0	0	0	0
Andreas Estner	Germany	2019	0	3	3	0	0	0	0	24
Ean Eyckmans	Belgium	2025	0	8	8	0	0	0	0	2
Alessandro Famularo	Venezuela/Italy (Note: Famularo is a Venezuelan driver who competed under an Italian licence in 2021.)	2020–2021	0	15	14	0	0	0	0	73
Jasin Ferati	Switzerland	2021	0	16	13	0	0	0	0	0
Emerson Fittipaldi Jr.^{F2}	Brazil	2023	0	20	20	0	0	0	0	4
Enzo Fittipaldi^{F2}	Brazil	2019	0	25	24	2	2	13	5	300
Adam Fitzgerald	Ireland	2023	0	8	7	0	0	0	0	0
Sophia Flörsch	Germany	2019	0	25	24	0	0	0	1	149
Lorenzo Fluxá	Spain	2021–2023	0	60	58	0	0	1	0	139
Leonardo Fornaroli^{F2}	Italy	2022	0	20	20	0	0	0	0	83
Igor Fraga	Brazil	2019	0	25	23	4	4	11	3	300
Reno Francot*	Netherlands	2025–2026	0	13	12	0	1	3	0	74
Enea Frey	Switzerland	2025–2026	0	9	9	0	0	0	0	0
Yujia Gao	China	2024	0	6	6	0	0	0	0	0
Belén García	Spain	2021	0	8	8	0	0	0	0	0
Marta García	Spain	2024	0	20	20	0	0	0	0	0
José Garfias	Mexico	2021	0	6	6	0	0	0	0	0
Tim Gerhards	Netherlands	2025	0	16	16	0	0	0	0	0
Matteo Giaccardi*	Monaco	2026	0	11	10	0	0	0	0	0
Evan Giltaire	France	2023–2025	0	44	44	2	2	7	1	282
Alessandro Giusti	France	2023–2024	0	40	40	2	5	11	5	306
Axel Gnos	Switzerland	2021–2022	0	38	33	0	0	0	0	0
Oliver Goethe^{F2}	Monaco (Note: Goethe is a Danish-German driver who competed under a Monégasque licence.)	2021	0	20	20	0	0	0	0	3
Nico Göhler	Germany	2020–2021	0	26	24	0	0	0	0	12
Gabriel Gomez*	Brazil	2026	0	11	10	0	0	0	0	23
Dion Gowda*	United Kingdom/India (Note: Gowda is an Indian driver who competed under a UK licence in 2025.)	2025–2026	0	31	30	0	0	0	1	57
Raúl Guzmán	Mexico	2019	0	25	24	0	0	2	0	180
Isack Hadjar^{F2}~	France	2021	0	20	20	1	2	5	3	166
Cenyu Han	China	2022	0	10	9	0	0	0	0	0
Salim Hanna*	Colombia	2026	0	11	10	0	0	3	0	59
Dennis Hauger^{F2}	Norway	2020	0	9	8	2	1	6	1	134
Kas Haverkort	Netherlands	2021–2023	0	60	60	3	4	10	6	285
Callum Hedge	Australia	2021	0	2	2	0	0	0	0	0
Gillian Henrion	France	2020, 2022	0	26	24	0	0	0	0	78
Jake Hughes^{F2}	United Kingdom	2019	0	3	3	0	0	3	1	45
Niko Kari^{F2}	Finland	2019	0	3	3	0	0	0	0	26
William Karlsson	Sweden	2023	0	4	4	0	0	0	0	0
Taito Kato	France (Note: Kato is a Japanese racing driver who competed under a French racing license.)	2025	0	20	20	0	0	2	0	107
Valentin Kluss	Germany	2023	0	2	2	0	0	0	0	0
Ivan Klymenko	Ukraine	2023	0	10	9	0	0	0	0	0
Niels Koolen^{F2}	Netherlands	2023	0	18	18	0	0	0	0	0
Andrija Kostić*	Serbia	2026	0	11	10	0	0	0	0	0
Tymek Kucharczyk	Poland	2023	0	2	2	0	0	0	0	0
Aditya Kulkarni	United Kingdom	2025	0	10	9	0	0	0	0	0
Nicola Lacorte	Italy	2024	0	20	20	0	0	0	0	3
Konsta Lappalainen	Finland	2019–2021, 2023	0	53	50	0	0	3	0	196
Kanato Le	Japan/United Kingdom (Note: Le is a Japanese racing driver who competed under a UK racing license in 2024.)	2024–2025	0	40	40	0	0	1	0	57
Tom Lebbon	United Kingdom	2023	0	20	20	0	0	0	0	0
Arthur Leclerc^{F2}	Monaco	2020	0	24	23	8	6	15	2	343
Kyuho Lee*	South Korea	2026	0	3	3	0	0	0	0	0
Noel León	Mexico	2022	0	20	20	0	0	0	0	3
Ruiqi Liu	China	2024–2025	0	40	40	0	0	0	0	6
Shannon Lugassy	Switzerland	2023	0	4	2	0	0	0	0	0
Francisco Macedo*	Portugal	2026	0	11	10	0	0	0	0	2
Zane Maloney^{F2}	Barbados	2021	0	20	20	1	1	7	1	170
Nicola Marinangeli	Italy	2020–2022	0	38	37	0	0	0	0	6
Giovanni Maschio*	Italy	2023–2026	0	71	70	0	0	0	0	7
Esteban Masson	France	2022–2023	0	52	52	0	0	1	0	40
Joey Mawson	Australia	2019	0	3	2	0	0	0	0	24
Lucas Medina	Colombia	2023	0	12	12	0	0	0	0	0
Sami Meguetounif^{F2}	France	2021–2023	0	42	41	0	0	4	1	96
Gabriele Minì^{F2}	Italy	2021–2022	0	40	40	3	3	13	5	264
Sebastián Montoya^{F2}	Colombia	2022	0	20	20	0	0	0	0	44
Alexandre Munoz*	France	2026	0	11	10	1	1	1	0	37
Théophile Naël	France	2024	0	20	20	1	1	1	0	81
Jin Nakamura	Japan	2025	0	20	20	0	0	1	3	81
Kean Nakamura-Berta*	United Kingdom (Note: Nakamura-Berta is a Japanese-Slovak racing driver who competed under an UK racing license.)	2026	0	11	10	4	2	4	2	114
Matteo Nannini^{F2}	Italy	2019–2020	0	19	18	0	0	0	1	57
Alex Ninovic*	Australia	2026	0	11	10	0	0	1	2	41
Sebastian Øgaard	Norway	2022	0	6	6	0	0	0	0	0
Emanuele Olivieri*	Italy	2026	0	11	10	1	1	3	1	85
Oleksandr Partyshev	Ukraine	2023	0	8	8	0	0	0	0	0
Patrik Pasma	Finland	2020–2022	0	46	45	3	4	6	3	346
Dexter Patterson	United Kingdom	2021	0	4	2	0	0	0	0	6
Emidio Pesce	Italy	2020–2021	0	44	41	0	0	0	0	50
Gianluca Petecof^{F2}	Brazil	2020–2021	1 (2020)	32	31	5	4	14	7	364
Enzo Peugeot	France	2024–2025	0	26	26	0	0	0	0	60
Edgar Pierre	France	2024	0	20	19	0	0	0	0	0
Doriane Pin	France	2024–2025	0	24	23	0	0	0	0	0
Francesco Pizzi	Italy	2021	0	20	20	0	0	0	0	12
Maximilian Popov*	Grenada	2026	0	11	10	1	1	1	0	41
Alex Powell	United States	2025	0	2	2	0	0	0	0	0
Pierre-Alexandre Provost	France	2023	0	10	9	0	0	0	0	0
Jan Przyrowski*	Poland	2025–2026	0	13	12	0	0	0	1	29
Alex Quinn	United Kingdom	2021	0	20	20	0	0	2	0	104
Santiago Ramos	Mexico	2022–2023, 2025	0	42	38	0	0	1	1	67
Oliver Rasmussen	Denmark	2020	0	24	22	5	6	13	3	343
Facu Regalia	Argentina	2020	0	3	3	0	0	0	0	0
Levente Révész	Hungary	2022–2023	0	46	45	0	0	0	0	2
Enzo Richer	Luxembourg	2025	0	2	2	0	0	0	0	0
Valerio Rinicella	Italy	2024–2025	0	22	22	0	0	0	0	6
Edu Robinson	Spain	2025	0	14	14	0	0	0	0	1
Ian Rodriguez	Guatemala	2020	0	24	22	0	1	2	0	45
Andrea Rosso	Italy	2021–2022	0	22	21	0	0	0	0	14
Jules Roussel*	France	2026	0	11	10	0	0	0	1	9
Marcus Sæter*	Norway	2026	0	11	10	0	0	0	0	11
Javier Sagrera	Spain	2023, 2025	0	8	8	0	0	0	0	0
Yuki Sano*	Japan	2026	0	11	10	0	0	1	0	28
Grégoire Saucy	Switzerland	2021	1 (2021)	20	20	8	8	10	2	277
Alex Sawer	Vietnam	2024	0	18	16	0	0	0	0	0
David Schumacher	Germany	2019	0	25	24	5	4	9	3	285
Enzo Scionti	United States	2023–2024	0	20	20	0	0	0	0	0
Sharon Scolari	Switzerland	2019	0	25	22	0	0	0	0	17
Reza Seewooruthun*	United Kingdom	2026	0	11	10	0	0	1	0	13
Elias Seppänen	Finland	2021	0	14	14	0	0	0	0	1
Marcos Siebert	Argentina	2019	0	13	12	0	0	1	1	70
Freddie Slater	United Kingdom	2025	1(2025)	20	20	6	8	12	7	313
Kirill Smal	Kyrgyzstan (Note: Smal is a Russian racing driver who competed under a Kyrgyz racing license.)	2023	0	10	10	0	0	0	0	0
Tommy Smith	Australia	2021	0	20	19	0	0	0	0	0
Francisco Soldavini	Argentina	2023	0	4	4	0	0	0	0	0
Martinius Stenshorne^{F2}	Norway	2023	0	20	20	3	5	11	3	261
Tomass Štolcermanis*	Latvia	2025–2026	0	13	12	0	0	0	0	11
Thomas Strauven	Belgium	2026	0	5	4	0	0	0	0	0
Noah Strømsted	Norway	2023–2024	0	24	24	1	0	4	2	121
Kacper Sztuka	Poland	2025	0	6	6	0	0	0	0	0
Owen Tangavelou	France	2022–2023	0	40	38	0	0	0	0	58
Tuukka Taponen	Finland	2024	0	20	19	3	4	7	2	198
Thomas ten Brinke	Netherlands	2021	0	10	8	0	0	0	0	28
Dan Ticktum^{F2}	United Kingdom	2019	0	6	6	0	0	2	0	64
Costa Toparis	Australia	2024	0	4	4	0	0	0	0	0
Tim Tramnitz	Germany	2022–2023	0	40	40	4	3	10	1	273
Ugo Ugochukwu	United States	2024	0	20	20	1	1	2	0	76
Frederik Vesti^{F2}	Denmark	2019	1 (2019)	25	24	10	13	20	9	467
Laurens van Hoepen^{F2}	Netherlands	2022–2023	0	40	40	0	0	2	0	86
Dilano van 't Hoff	Netherlands	2021–2023	0	28	25	0	0	1	0	25
Yaroslav Veselaho	Ukraine	2024–2025	0	38	35	0	0	0	0	0
David Vidales	Spain	2021	0	20	20	1	1	3	1	102
Jüri Vips^{F2}	Estonia	2020	0	9	9	0	0	3	3	81
Maya Weug	Netherlands/Spain	2023–2025	0	24	24	0	0	0	0	27
James Wharton^{F2}	Australia	2024	0	20	19	5	4	10	2	236
Sebastian Wheldon*	United States	2026	0	11	10	1	2	5	0	121
Piotr Wiśnicki	Poland	2022	0	18	17	0	0	0	0	0
Charlie Wurz	Austria	2023	0	10	10	0	0	0	0	1
Hiyu Yamakoshi	Japan	2025	0	20	20	0	0	2	0	86
Enzo Yeh	Chinese Taipei	2025	0	12	12	0	0	0	0	0
Matías Zagazeta	Peru	2022–2023	0	40	39	0	0	0	0	12
Lirim Zendeli^{F2}	Germany	2019	0	3	3	0	0	2	0	42

== By racing license ==
License	Total drivers	Champions	Championships	Current	First driver(s)	Most recent driver(s)/ current driver(s)
Argentina	4	0	0	0	Marcos Siebert (2019 Vallelunga round)	Francisco Soldavini (2023 Hockenheimring round)
Australia	7	0	0	1	Joey Mawson (2019 Vallelunga round)	Alex Ninovic (2026 Monza round)
Austria	1	0	0	0	Charlie Wurz (2023 Imola round)	Charlie Wurz (2023 Le Castellet round)
Barbados	1	0	0	0	Zane Maloney (2021 Imola round)	Zane Maloney (2021 Monza round)
Belgium	2	0	0	0	Ean Eyckmans (2025 Hungaroring round)	Thomas Strauven (2026 Spa round)
Brazil	10	2 (Petecof, Câmara)	2 (2020, 2024)	2	Enzo Fittipaldi, Igor Fraga (2019 Le Castellet round)	Miguel Costa, Gabriel Gomez (2026 Monza round)
China	4	0	0	0	Cenyu Han (2022 Monza round)	Ruiqi Liu (2025 Monza round)
Chinese Taipei	1	0	0	0	Enzo Yeh (2025 Misano round)	Enzo Yeh (2025 Imola round)
Colombia	4	0	0	1	Sebastián Montoya, Nicolás Baptiste (2022 Monza round)	Salim Hanna (2026 Monza round)
Czech Republic	2	0	0	0	Tom Beckhäuser (2019 Hungaroring round)	Tereza Bábíčková (2022 Red Bull Ring round)
Denmark	2	1 (Vesti)	1 (2019)	0	Frederik Vesti (2019 Le Castellet round)	Oliver Rasmussen (2020 Vallelunga round)
Estonia	2	0	0	0	Jüri Vips (2020 Misano round)	Paul Aron (2022 Mugello round)
Finland	7	0	0	0	Isac Blomqvist, Konsta Lappalainen (2019 Le Castellet round)	Tuukka Taponen (2024 Monza round)
France	26	0	0	4	Alexandre Bardinon (2019 Vallelunga round)	Andrea Dupé, Alexandre Munoz, Jules Roussel (2026 Monza round)
Germany	7	0	0	0	Sophia Flörsch, David Schumacher (2019 Le Castellet round)	Tim Tramnitz, Valentin Kluss (2023 Hockenheimring round)
Grenada	1	0	0	1	Maximilian Popov (2026 Red Bull Ring round)	Maximilian Popovd (2026 Monza round)
Guatemala	1	0	0	0	Ian Rodriguez (2020 Imola round)	Ian Rodriguez (2020 Imola round)
Hungary	1	0	0	0	Levente Révész (2022 Monza round)	Levente Révész (2023 Monza round)
India	4	0	0	2	Nikhil Bohra (2024 Hockenheimring round)	Kai Daryanani, Dion Gowda (2026 Monza round)
Ireland	2	0	0	0	Keith Donegan (2022 Monza round)	Adam Fitzgerald (2023 Spa-Francorchamps round)
Israel	1	0	0	0	Ido Cohen (2021 Spa-Francorchamps round)	Ido Cohen (2021 Monza round)
Italy	21	1 (Antonelli)	1 (2023)	3	Matteo Nannini (2019 Vallelunga round)	Emanuele Olivieri, Giovanni Maschio, Zhenrui Chi (2026 Monza round)
Japan	4	0	0	1	Jin Nakamura, Hiyu Yamakoshi, Kanato Le (2025 Misano round)	Yuki Sano (2026 Monza round)
Kuwait	1	0	0	1	Saqer Al Maosherji (2025 Misano round)	Saqer Al Maosherji (2026 Monza round)
Kazakhstan	1	0	0	1	Alexander Abkhazava (2026 Red Bull Ring round)	Alexander Abkhazava (2026 Monza round)
Kyrgyzstan	2	0	0	0	Michael Belov (2023 Imola round)	Michael Belov (2025 Monza round)
Latvia	1	0	0	1	Tomass Štolcermanis (2025 Monza round)	Tomass Štolcermanis (2026 Monza round)
Luxembourg	1	0	0	0	Enzo Richer (2025 Hungaroring round)	Enzo Richer (2025 Hungaroring round)
Malta	1	0	0	0	Zachary David (2024 Hockenheimring round)	Zachary David (2025 Imola round)
Mexico	5	0	0	0	Raúl Guzmán (2019 Le Castellet round)	Santiago Ramos (2025 Catalunya round)
Monaco	3	0	0	1	Arthur Leclerc (2020 Misano round)	Matteo Giaccardi (2026 Monza round)
Netherlands	8	0	0	1	Kas Haverkort (2021 Imola round)	Reno Francot (2026 Monza round)
Neutral	1	0	0	0	Michael Belov (2022 Monza round)	Michael Belov (2022 Zandvoort round)
Norway	5	0	0	1	Dennis Hauger (2020 Catalunya round)	Marcus Sæter (2026 Monza round)
Paraguay	1	0	0	0	Joshua Dürksen (2022 Monza round)	Joshua Dürksen (2023 Hockenheimring round)
Peru	1	0	0	0	Matías Zagazeta (2022 Monza round)	Matías Zagazeta (2023 Hockenheimring round)
Poland	5	0	0	1	Roman Biliński, Piotr Wiśnicki (2022 Monza round)	Jan Przyrowski (2026 Monza round)
Portugal	2	0	0	1	Ivan Domingues (2024 Zandvoort round)	Francisco Macedo (2026 Monza round)
Russia	1	0	0	0	Michael Belov (2021 Imola round)	Michael Belov (2021 Monza round)
Serbia	1	0	0	1	Andrija Kostić (2026 Red Bull Ring round)	Andrija Kostić (2026 Monza round)
Singapore	2	0	0	1	Nikhil Bohra (2023 Imola round)	Kabir Anurag (2026 Monza round)
South Korea	1	0	0	1	Kyuho Lee (2026 Monza round)	Kyuho Lee (2026 Monza round)
Spain	10	0	0	0	Brad Benavides, David Vidales, Mari Boya, Lorenzo Fluxá, Belén García (2021 Imola round)	Edu Robinson (2025 Monza round)
Sweden	2	1 (Beganovic)	1 (2022)	0	Dino Beganovic (2021 Imola round)	William Karlsson (2023 Monza round)
Switzerland	8	1 (Saucy)	1 (2021)	0	Sharon Scolari (2019 Le Castellet round)	Enea Frey (2026 Red Bull Ring round)
Thailand	1	0	0	0	Nandhavud Bhirombhakdi (2024 Hockenheimring round)	Nandhavud Bhirombhakdi (2025 Monza round)
Ukraine	3	0	0	0	Oleksandr Partyshev (2023 Imola round)	Yaroslav Veselaho (2025 Monza round)
United Arab Emirates	3	0	0	1	Hamda Al Qubaisi (2022 Monza round)	Rashid Al Dhaheri (2026 Monza round)
United Kingdom	16	1 (Slater)	1 (2025)	2	Olli Caldwell (2019 Le Castellet round)	Kean Nakamura-Berta, Reza Seewooruthun (2026 Monza round)
United States	8	0	0	2	Arias Deukmedjian (2021 Mugello round)	Rahim Alibhai, Sebastian Wheldon (2026 Monza round)
Venezuela	1	0	0	0	Alessandro Famularo (2020 Spielberg round)	Alessandro Famularo (2020 Monza round)
Vietnam	1	0	0	0	Alex Sawer (2024 Hockenheimring round)	Alex Sawer (2024 Monza round)
