= Adam Fitzgerald (racing driver) =

Irish racing driver

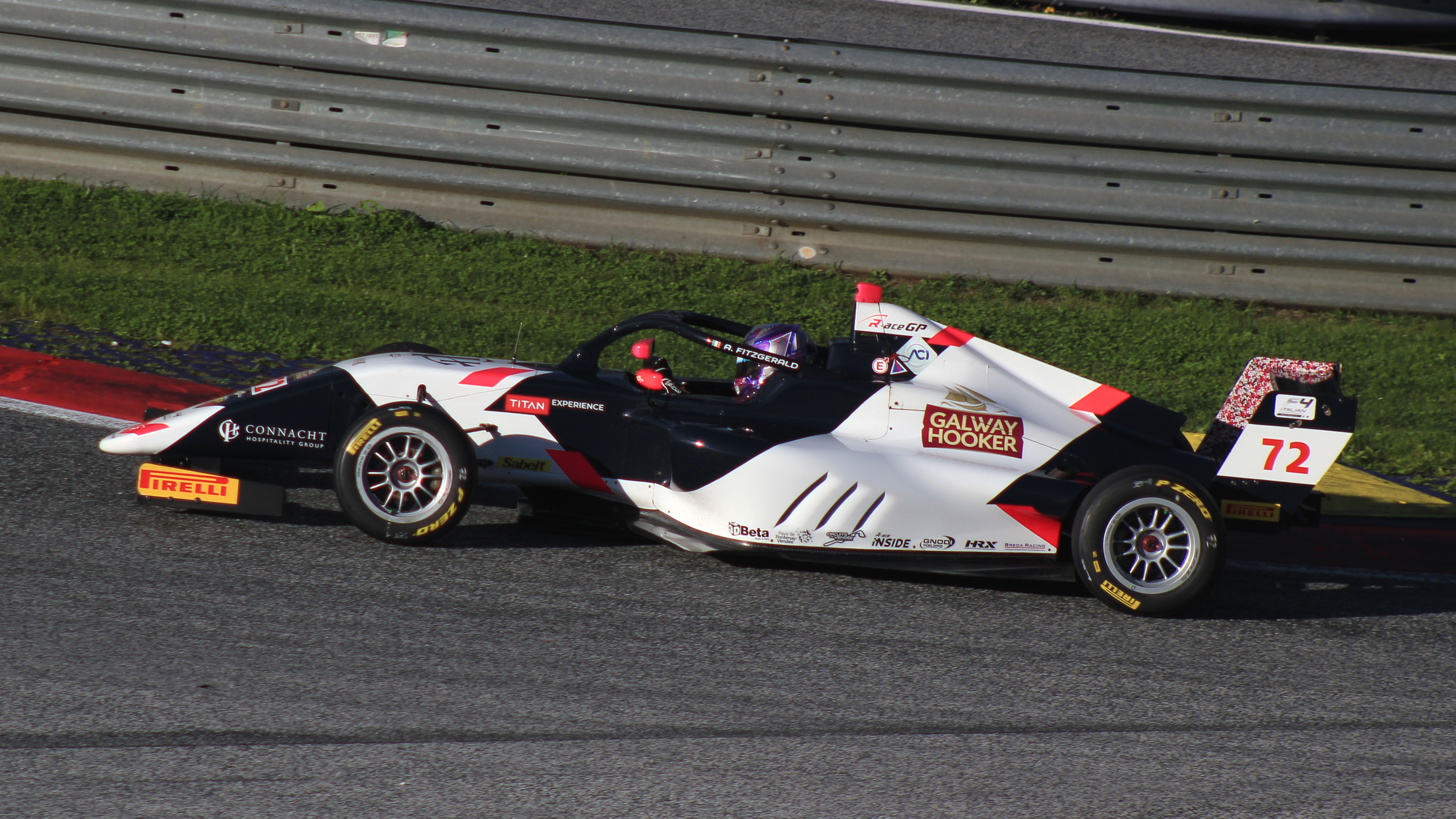
- Fitzgerald driving at the Red Bull Ring in 2022.
- Nationality: (Republic of Ireland) Irish
- Born: 8 December 2003 (age 22) County Galway, Ireland

USF Pro 2000 career
- Debut season: 2023
- Current team: Turn 3 Motorsport
- Car number: 2
- Starts: 8 (8 entries)
- Wins: 0
- Podiums: 0
- Poles: 0
- Fastest laps: 0
- Best finish: 21st in 2024

Previous series
- 2023 2023 2022 2022: FR European; FR Oceania; F4 Italian; F4 British

Adam Fitzgerald (born 8 December 2003) is an Irish racing driver who last competed in the 2024 USF Pro 2000 Championship with Turn 3 Motorsport. He made his car racing debut in the 2022 F4 British Championship and competed in the 2023 Formula Regional European Championship with RPM.

== Career ==
=== Karting ===
Fitzgerald began his karting career in 2019 in his native Ireland, before moving into British competitions. In his final year of karting, 2021, he competed in the British Kart Championships in the Senior X30 category.

=== Formula 4 ===
==== British F4 ====
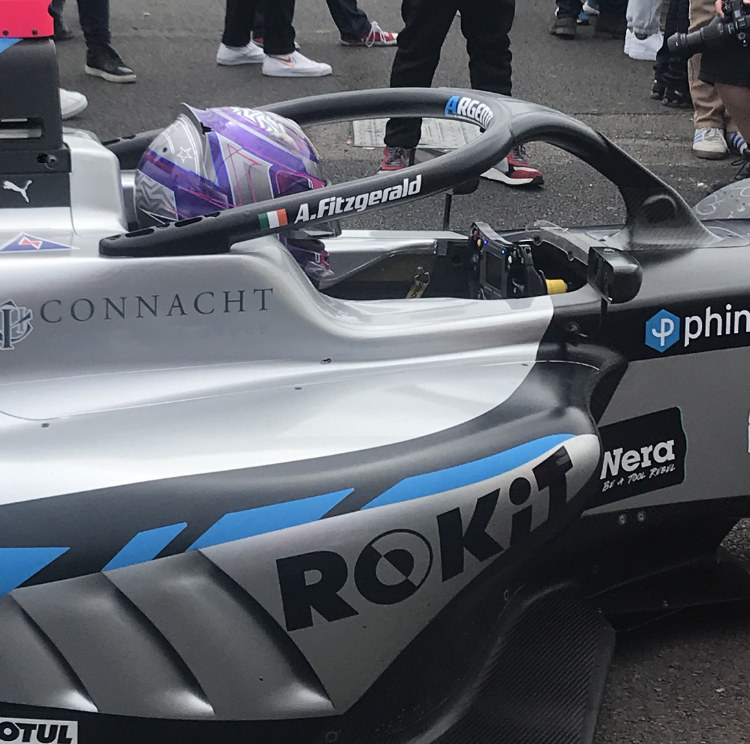
Fitzgerald in the car before a race at Thruxton Circuit in the 2022 F4 British Championship.

In 2022, Fitzgerald made his car racing debut in the F4 British Championship with Phinsys by Argenti. With eight podiums in the rookie class, he finished fourth in the rookie class and 14th in the overall standings.

==== Italian F4 ====
Fitzgerald joined the grid of the Italian F4 Championship at the Vallelunga round during the same year, driving for R-ace GP. He raced again in the following round at the Red Bull Ring, scoring points in Race 1 with an eighth-placed finish, which elevated him to 22nd in the overall standings.

=== Formula Regional ===
==== Formula Regional Oceania Championship ====
On 11 January 2023, it was announced that Fitzgerald would compete for Giles Motorsport in the final three rounds of the 2023 Formula Regional Oceania Championship. With a best finish of fourth place, he finished 17th in the standings.

==== Formula Regional European Championship ====
In late 2022, Fitzgerald drove for Race Performance Motorsport in the post-season test of the Formula Regional European Championship. Speaking to RTÉ, RPM owner Keith Donegan cited how he wished to field an Irish driver in the 2023 season, mentioning Fitzgerald who had been testing with the team. Fitzgerald was later confirmed to be driving for RPM for the 2023 season, and subsequently appeared on The Late Late Show alongside RPM owner Keith Donegan.

During the first race of the season at the first round at the Imola Circuit, Fitzgerald broke three vertebrae and was hospitalised after a collision with sausage kerbs on the track, a similar incident to that of Abbie Eaton during the 2021 Austin W Series round. RPM owner Keith Donegan expressed his anger for the continued inclusion of sausage kerbs, stating that "these sausage kerbs are for GT cars with really soft suspension, and whenever a single-seater goes over these sausage kerbs, it launches the car". Fitzgerald was able to return for the second round at the Circuit de Barcelona-Catalunya.

On 1 July 2023, in a FRECA race at Spa-Francorchamps, Fitzgerald was involved in a multi-car chain reaction collision initiated when Tim Tramnitz lost control. Fitzgerald collided at high speed with Dilano van 't Hoff. The accident left the RPM driver with many broken bones whilst van 't Hoff subsequently lost his life. Due to his injuries, Fitzgerald was unable to compete in any of the remaining rounds. He returned to training less than nine weeks after his serious crash. He was 38th in the standings, with a best finish of 19th place.

=== USF Pro 2000 Championship ===
In October 2023, three months after the crash, Fitzgerald returned to a racing car, driving a USF Pro 2000 car at the Autobahn Country Club.

==== 2024 ====
For his 2024 campaign, Fitzgerald switched to racing in America after that successful test, joining the USF Pro 2000 Championship with Turn 3 Motorsport. Ahead of the Freedom 90, Fitzgerald announced he would not continue his championship campaign.

== Racing record ==
=== Racing career summary ===
Season	Series	Team	Races	Wins	Poles	F/Laps	Podiums	Points	Position
2022	F4 British Championship	Phinsys by Argenti	30	0	0	0	0	37	14th
2022	Italian F4 Championship	R-ace GP	6	0	0	0	0	4	22nd
2023	Formula Regional Oceania Championship	Giles Motorsport	9	0	0	0	0	81	17th
2023	Formula Regional European Championship	RPM	7	0	0	0	0	0	38th
2024	USF Pro 2000 Championship	Turn 3 Motorsport	8	0	0	0	0	51	21st

=== Complete F4 British Championship results ===
(key) (Races in bold indicate pole position) (Races in italics indicate fastest lap)

Year	Team	1	2	3	4	5	6	7	8	9	10	11	12	13	14	15	16	17	18	19	20	21	22	23	24	25	26	27	28	29	30	DC	Points
2022	Phinsys by Argenti	DON; 1; 11	DON; 2; 12^{2}	DON; 3; 15	BHI; 1; 13	BHI; 2; 12^{1}	BHI; 3; 12	THR1; 1; 10	THR1; 2; 11^{3}	THR1; 3; 8	OUL; 1; 14	OUL; 2; 10	OUL; 3; 11	CRO; 1; 11	CRO; 2; 11	CRO; 3; 7	KNO; 1; 12	KNO; 2; 11	KNO; 3; 12	SNE; 1; 10	SNE; 2; 17	SNE; 3; 12	THR2; 1; 9	THR2; 2; 5	THR2; 3; 8	SIL; 1; 12	SIL; 2; 13^{2}	SIL; 3; 10	BHGP; 1; 10	BHGP; 2; 9^{3}	BHGP; 3; 16	14th	37

=== Complete Italian F4 Championship results ===
(key) (Races in bold indicate pole position) (Races in italics indicate fastest lap)

Year	Team	1	2	3	4	5	6	7	8	9	10	11	12	13	14	15	16	17	18	19	20	21	22	DC	Points
2022	R-ace GP	IMO; 1	IMO; 2	IMO; 3	MIS; 1	MIS; 2	MIS; 3	SPA; 1	SPA; 2	SPA; 3	VLL; 1; 25	VLL; 2; 30	VLL; 3 Ret	RBR; 1; 8	RBR; 2; 22	RBR; 3	RBR; 4 Ret	MNZ; 1	MNZ; 2	MNZ; 3	MUG; 1	MUG; 2	MUG; 3	22nd	4

=== Complete Formula Regional Oceania Championship results ===
(key) (Races in bold indicate pole position) (Races in italics indicate fastest lap)

Year	Team	1	2	3	4	5	6	7	8	9	10	11	12	13	14	15	DC	Points
2023	Giles Motorsport	HIG; 1	HIG; 2	HIG; 3	TER; 1	TER; 2	TER; 3	MAN; 1 Ret	MAN; 2; 12	MAN; 3; 8	HMP; 1; 4	HMP; 2; 6	HMP; 3; 16	TAU; 1; 11	TAU; 2; 11	TAU; 3; 17	17th	81

=== Complete Formula Regional European Championship results ===
(key) (Races in bold indicate pole position) (Races in italics indicate fastest lap)

Year	Team	1	2	3	4	5	6	7	8	9	10	11	12	13	14	15	16	17	18	19	20	DC	Points
2023	RPM	IMO; 1; 22	IMO; 2 WD	CAT; 1; 24	CAT; 2; 28	HUN; 1; 21	HUN; 2; 19	SPA; 1; 25	SPA; 2; 25	MUG; 1	MUG; 2	LEC; 1	LEC; 2	RBR; 1	RBR; 2	MNZ; 1	MNZ; 2	ZAN; 1	ZAN; 2	HOC; 1	HOC; 2	38th	0

=== American open-wheel racing results ===
==== USF Pro 2000 Championship ====
(key) (Races in bold indicate pole position) (Races in italics indicate fastest lap) (Races with * indicate most race laps led)

Year	Team	1	2	3	4	5	6	7	8	9	10	11	12	13	14	15	16	17	18	Rank	Points
2024	Turn 3 Motorsport	STP; 1; 15	STP; 2; 14	LOU; 1; 17	LOU; 2; 13	LOU; 3; 15	IMS; 1; 9	IMS; 2; 19	IMS; 3; 15	IRP	ROA; 1	ROA; 2	ROA; 3	MOH; 1	MOH; 2	TOR; 1	TOR; 2	POR; 1	POR; 2	21st	51
