= Race Performance Motorsport =

(Italy) (Republic of Ireland) Race Performance Motorsport
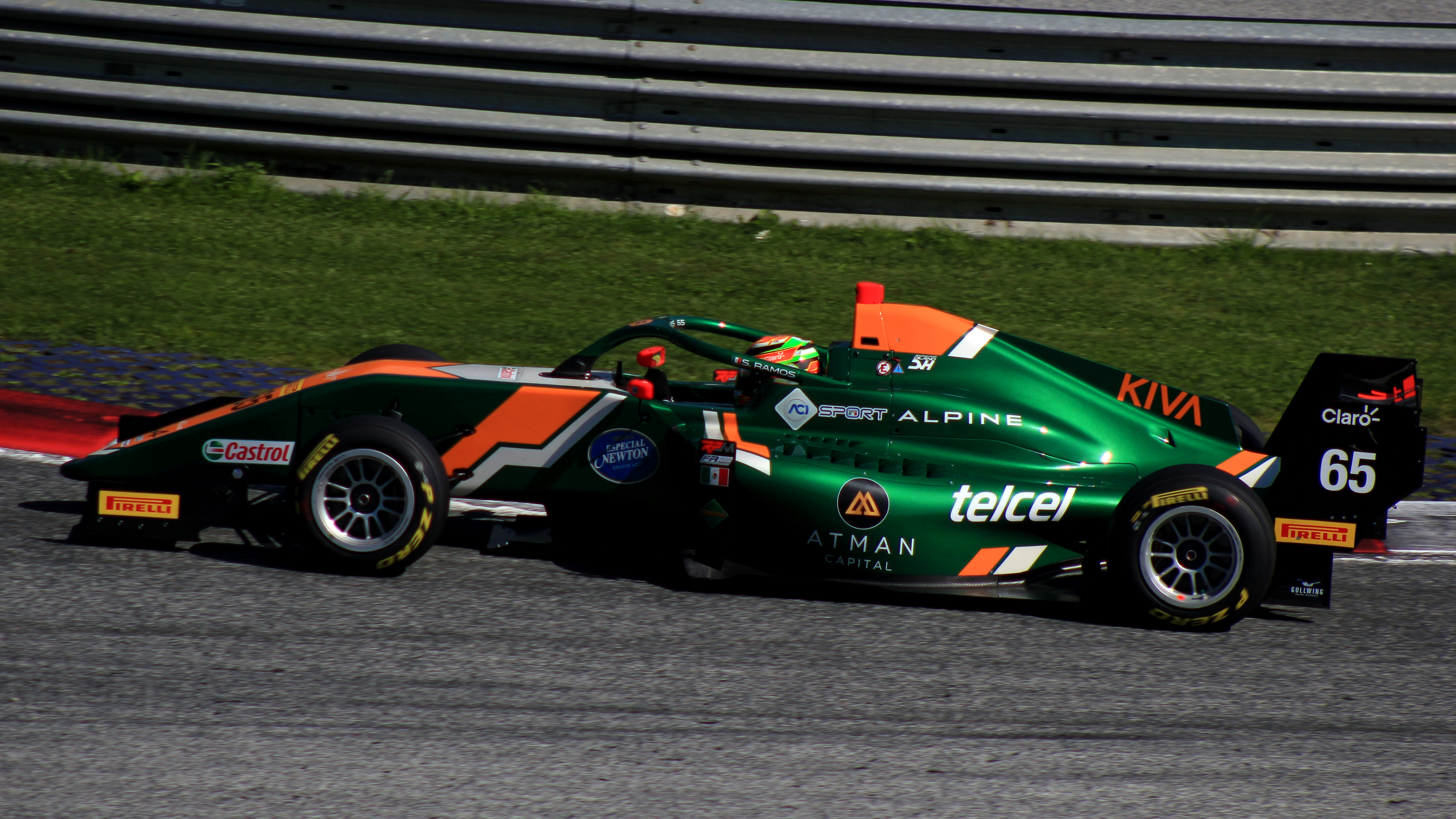
- Founded: 2022
- Founder(s): Keith Donegan
- Base: Piacenza, Italy
- Team principal(s): Enrico Carraro
- Current series: Formula Regional European Championship
- Current drivers: Formula Regional European Championship (Italy) Giovanni Maschio (Netherlands) Reno Francot (Belgium) Ean Eyckmans
- Drivers' Championships: 2024 FRECA Rookie Champion - Noah Strømsted

Race Performance Motorsport (RPM) is an Italian-based, Irish-owned auto racing team currently competing in the Formula Regional European Championship.

== Background ==
2022

In February 2022, Irish racing driver Keith Donegan purchased the assets of RP Motorsport to start his own team, Race Performance Motorsport (RPM). The team is registered in Italy, and based in Piacenza, like its predecessor. With an aim to compete in the Formula Regional European Championship, he took on Enrico Carraro as team manager, and the team made their competition debut in the 2022 Formula Regional European Championship, when they took the place of DR Formula. They started their first season with Italian racing driver Pietro Delli Guanti and Donegan himself.

In an interview on 16 May 2022, Donegan revealed intentions for the team to field a third car in the Formula Regional European Championship before the end of the 2022 season.

For Round 6 at the Hungaroring, the team fielded Andrea Rosso in the third car to be kept for the remainder of the season, and Owen Tangavelou replaced Donegan as the driver in the second car. It was at that same round RPM scored the team's first points in FRECA, with Tangavelou finishing in P9. Tangavelou would go on to score 14 more points in 2022, making him the best placed RPM driver with P20 in the standings.

Pierre-Louis Chovet joined the team for the last 3 rounds replacing Pietro Delli Guanti and immediately scored RPM's first podium. He would go on and score another podium at the Barcelona round.

2023

For the 2023 season, the team signed Macéo Capietto, Santiago Ramos and Adam Fitzgerald. The latter appeared on The Late Late Show alongside RPM owner Keith Donegan before the season started.

During the first race of the season at the first round at the Imola Circuit, Fitzgerald broke three vertebrae and was hospitalized after a collision with sausage kerbs on the track, a similar incident to that of Abbie Eaton during the 2021 Austin W Series round. Fitzgerald was able to return for the second round at the Circuit de Barcelona-Catalunya.

On 1 July 2023 at Spa-Francorchamps, Fitzgerald was involved in a multi-car chain reaction collision initiated when Tim Tramnitz lost control. Fitzgerald collided at high speed with Dilano van 't Hoff. The accident left the RPM driver with many broken bones whilst Van 't Hoff subsequently lost his life. Due to his injuries, Fitzgerald was unable to compete in any of the remaining rounds. He returned to training less than nine weeks after his serious crash. He was 38th in the standings, with a best finish of 19th place.

Noah Strømsted joined RPM during the last two rounds of the season. Maceo Capietto and Santiago Ramos scored a total of 144 points, which resulted in a 4th in the 2023 FRECA Teams Standings.

2024

Noah Strømsted remained with the team for 2024. and was joined by Giovanni Maschio and Edgar Pierre. Strømsted took 4 podiums on the way to take 6th in the driver's championship, securing the rookie title ahead of drivers like Evan Giltaire and Pedro Clerot. RPM finished 6th in the team's standings with 122 points.

2025

Giovanni Maschio remained with the team for the 2025 season, teaming up with Enzo Peugeot who switched from Saintéloc Racing, and Enzo Yeh. Maschio scored a couple of points finishes for the team, while the other two seats changed drivers many times throughout the season, leading to RPM finishing 7th in the teams standings with 9 points.

2026

Maschio was once again retained for what was set to be his third year with the team, and he was joined by Spanish F4 drivers Jan Przyrowski, who returned after racing for RPM in the final round of 2025, as well as Miguel Costa, both of whom finished 3rd and 14th respectively. Przyrowski took the team's first ever win in the championship, when he finished first at Race 1 of the final round at Hockenheim, where British F4 driver Lewis Wherrell also made his debut, replacing Maschio who left the series to prioritize his LMP3 campaign. The team once again finished 7th in the standings, this time with 74 points.

== Current series results ==
=== Formula Regional European Championship ===
Year	Car	Tyres	Drivers	Races	Wins	Poles	F. Laps	Podiums	D.C.	Pts	T.C.	Pts
2022	Tatuus F3 T-318- Alpine	P	(Italy) Pietro Delli Guanti	14	0	0	0	0	25th	1	9th	16
2022	Tatuus F3 T-318- Alpine	P	(France) Pierre-Louis Chovet†	6	0	0	0	0	NC	0	9th	16
2022	Tatuus F3 T-318- Alpine	P	(Republic of Ireland) Keith Donegan	9	0	0	0	0	30th	0	9th	16
2022	Tatuus F3 T-318- Alpine	P	(France) Owen Tangavelou	9	0	0	0	0	20th	15	9th	16
2022	Tatuus F3 T-318- Alpine	P	(Italy) Andrea Rosso	2	0	0	0	0	34th	0	9th	16
2022	Tatuus F3 T-318- Alpine	P	(Mexico) Santiago Ramos	2	0	0	0	0	27th	0	9th	16
2023	Tatuus F3 T-318- Alpine	P	(Denmark) Noah Strømsted†	4	0	0	0	0	NC	0	4th	144
2023	Tatuus F3 T-318- Alpine	P	(Mexico) Santiago Ramos	17	0	0	1	1	11th	67	4th	144
2023	Tatuus F3 T-318- Alpine	P	(Republic of Ireland) Adam Fitzgerald	7	0	0	0	0	38th	0	4th	144
2023	Tatuus F3 T-318- Alpine	P	(France) Macéo Capietto	20	0	0	0	1	8th	77	4th	144
2024	Tatuus F3 T-318- Alpine	P	(France) Edgar Pierre	19	0	0	0	0	31st	0	6th	122
2024	Tatuus F3 T-318- Alpine	P	(Denmark) Noah Strømsted	20	0	1	3	4	6th	121	6th	122
2024	Tatuus F3 T-318- Alpine	P	(Italy) Giovanni Maschio	20	0	0	0	0	24th	1	6th	122
2025	Tatuus F3 T-318- Alpine	P	(Chinese Taipei) Enzo Yeh	12	0	0	0	0	23rd	0	8th	9
2025	Tatuus F3 T-318- Alpine	P	(Netherlands) Reno Francot	2	0	0	0	0	20th	1	8th	9
2025	Tatuus F3 T-318- Alpine	P	(France) Macéo Capietto	2	0	0	0	0	32nd	0	8th	9
2025	Tatuus F3 T-318- Alpine	P	(Poland) Kacper Sztuka	2	0	0	0	0	24th	0	8th	9
2025	Tatuus F3 T-318- Alpine	P	(Latvia) Tomass Štolcermanis†	2	0	0	0	0	NC	0	8th	9
2025	Tatuus F3 T-318- Alpine	P	(France) Enzo Peugeot	6	0	0	0	0	22nd	0	8th	9
2025	Tatuus F3 T-318- Alpine	P	(Belgium) Ean Eyckmans	8	0	0	0	0	19th	2	8th	9
2025	Tatuus F3 T-318- Alpine	P	(Mexico) Santiago Ramos†	2	0	0	0	0	NC	0	8th	9
2025	Tatuus F3 T-318- Alpine	P	(United States) James Egozi†	2	0	0	0	0	NC	0	8th	9
2025	Tatuus F3 T-318- Alpine	P	(Poland) Jan Przyrowski†	2	0	0	0	0	NC	0	8th	9
2025	Tatuus F3 T-318- Alpine	P	(Italy) Giovanni Maschio	20	0	0	0	0	17th	6	8th	9
2026*	Tatuus T-326- Toyota	P	(Brazil) Miguel Costa	7	0	0	0	0	20th	4	9th	16
2026*	Tatuus T-326- Toyota	P	(Poland) Jan Przyrowski	7	0	0	0	0	15th	12	9th	16
2026*	Tatuus T-326- Toyota	P	(Italy) Giovanni Maschio	7	0	0	0	0	28th	0	9th	16
2026*	Tatuus T-326- Toyota	P	(United Kingdom) Lewis Wherrell								9th	16

*Season still in progress

† Guest driver ineligible to score points.

==== In detail ====
(key) (Races in bold indicate pole position) (Races in italics indicate fastest lap)

Year	Drivers	1	2	3	4	5	6	7	8	9	10	11	12	13	14	15	16	17	18	19	20	T.C.	Points
2022		MNZ; 1	MNZ; 2	IMO; 1	IMO; 2	MCO; 1	MCO; 2	LEC; 1	LEC; 2	ZAN; 1	ZAN; 2	HUN; 1	HUN; 2	SPA; 1	SPA; 2	RBR; 1	RBR; 2	CAT; 1	CAT; 2	MUG; 1	MUG; 2	9th	16
2022	(Italy) Pietro Delli Guanti	Ret	24	16	Ret	19	16	12	15	10	Ret	21	29†	25	18							9th	16
2022	(France) Pierre-Louis Chovet															3	7	15	3	14	16	9th	16
2022	(Republic of Ireland) Keith Donegan	31†	16	25	25	20	DNQ	27	19	Ret	29											9th	16
2022	(France) Owen Tangavelou											19	9	9	9	14	11	17	Ret	DNS	6	9th	16
2022	(Italy) Andrea Rosso											27	20									9th	16
2022	(Mexico) Santiago Ramos																			18	19	9th	16
2023		IMO; 1	IMO; 2	CAT; 1	CAT; 2	HUN; 1	HUN; 2	SPA; 1	SPA; 2	MUG; 1	MUG; 2	LEC; 1	LEC; 2	RBR; 1	RBR; 2	MNZ; 1	MNZ; 2	ZAN; 1	ZAN; 2	HOC; 1	HOC; 2	4th	144
2023	(Denmark) Noah Strømsted															Ret	6			14	13	4th	144
2023	(Mexico) Santiago Ramos	23	6	Ret	4	3^{F}	8	8	10	12	4	Ret	6	29	Ret	15	22	WD	WD	10	DNS	4th	144
2023	(Republic of Ireland) Adam Fitzgerald	22	WD	24	28	21	19	25	25													4th	144
2023	(France) Macéo Capietto	Ret	9	5	7	10	3	6	8	8	6	21	10	8	13	Ret	12	10	13	7	10	4th	144
2024		HOC; 1	HOC; 2	SPA; 1	SPA; 2	ZAN; 1	ZAN; 2	HUN; 1	HUN; 2	MUG; 1	MUG; 2	LEC; 1	LEC; 2	IMO; 1	IMO; 2	RBR; 1	RBR; 2	CAT; 1	CAT; 2	MNZ; 1	MNZ; 2	6th	122
2024	(France) Edgar Pierre	29	Ret	28†	19	22	17	22	21	25	25	Ret	19	20	Ret	DNS	Ret	25	19	18	22	6th	122
2024	(Denmark) Noah Strømsted	11	12	4^{F}	2	14	4	Ret	15	9	9	Ret	2^{F}	11	2	9	2^{P F}	5	6	28†	10	6th	122
2024	(Italy) Giovanni Maschio	20	15	Ret	16	19	21	19	20	Ret	23	26	10	21	Ret	14	13	17	22	Ret	17	6th	122
2025		MIS; 1	MIS; 2	SPA; 1	SPA; 2	ZAN; 1	ZAN; 2	HUN; 1	HUN; 2	LEC; 1	LEC; 2	IMO; 1	IMO; 2	RBR; 1	RBR; 2	CAT; 1	CAT; 2	HOC; 1	HOC; 2	MNZ; 1	MNZ; 2	8th	9
2025	(Chinese Taipei) Enzo Yeh	15	21	23	18	18	18	18	13	23	14	11	16									8th	9
2025	(Netherlands) Reno Francot													16	10							8th	9
2025	(France) Macéo Capietto															19	17					8th	9
2025	(Poland) Kacper Sztuka																	21	16			8th	9
2025	(Latvia) Tomass Štolcermanis																			Ret	9	8th	9
2025	(France) Enzo Peugeot	13	11	11	11	14	11															8th	9
2025	(Belgium) Ean Eyckmans							Ret	12	22	Ret	17	10	10	15							8th	9
2025	(Mexico) Santiago Ramos															14	20					8th	9
2025	(United States) James Egozi																	8	11			8th	9
2025	(Poland) Jan Przyrowski																			12	5	8th	9
2025	(Italy) Giovanni Maschio	16	Ret	13	8	23	25	16	23	12	Ret	18	Ret	20	20	21	Ret	15	25	15	12	8th	9
2026	(Brazil) Miguel Costa																						
2026	(Poland) Jan Przyrowski																						
2026	(Italy) Giovanni Maschio																						
