= Giovanni Maschio =

Italian racing driver (born 2006)

- Maschio at Silverstone Circuit in 2026.
- Nationality: (Italy) Italian
- Born: 11 October 2006 (age 20) Veneto, Italy

Formula Regional European Championship career
- Debut season: 2023
- Current team: RPM
- Categorisation: FIA Silver
- Car number: 99
- Former teams: Monolite Racing
- Starts: 78
- Wins: 0
- Podiums: 0
- Poles: 0
- Fastest laps: 0
- Best finish: 17th in 2025

Previous series
- 2023–2026 2022 2022: FR Middle East; ACCR Formula 4 Trophy; Italian F4
- Statistics up to date as of 14 September 2026.

Giovanni Maschio (Italian pronunciation: [dʒoˈvanni ˈmaskjo]; born 11 October 2006) is an Italian racing driver who last competed in the Formula Regional European Championship for team RPM.

== Career ==
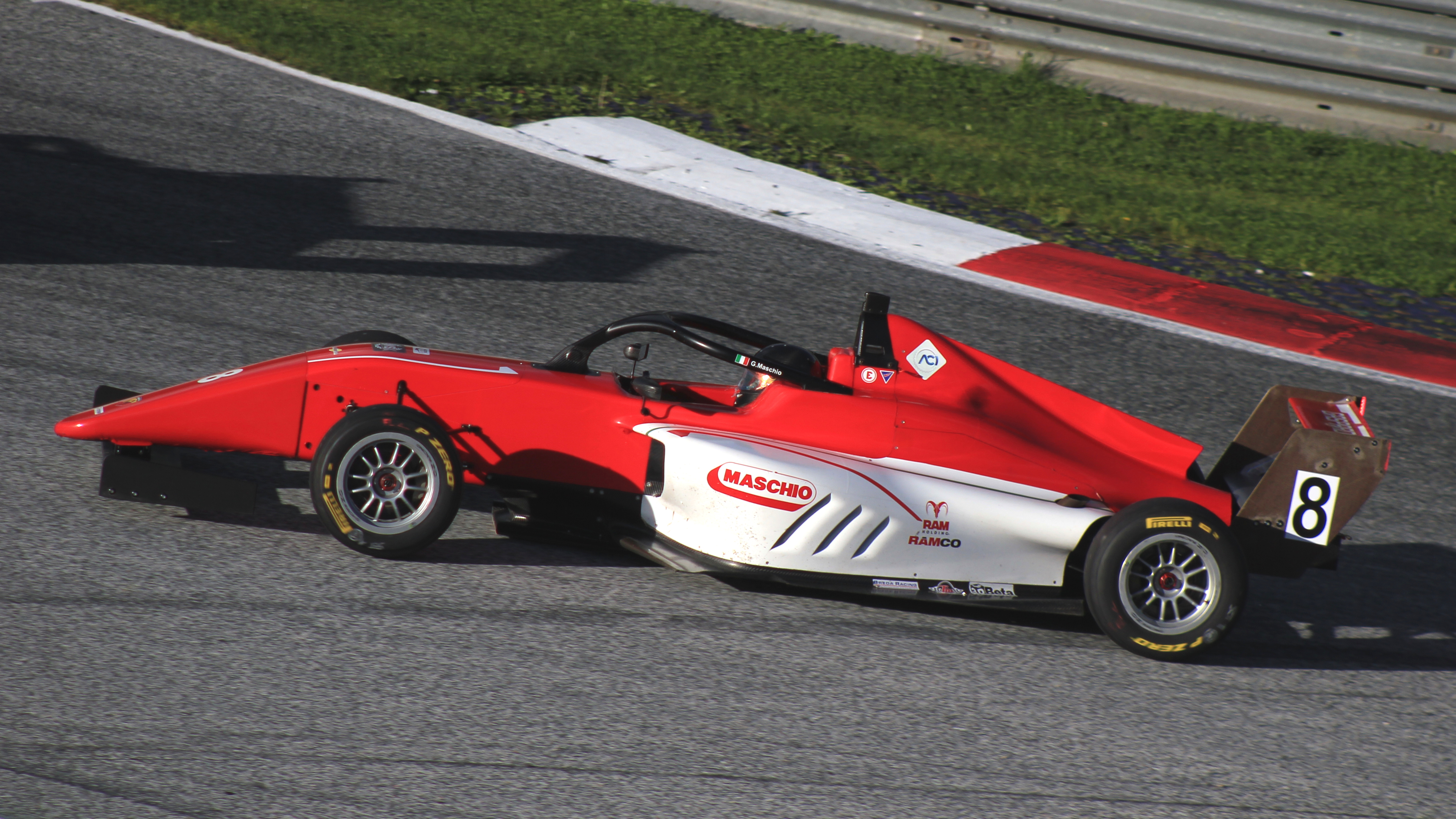
Maschio racing in the 2022 Italian F4 Championship at the Red Bull Ring.

=== Formula 4 ===
Maschio made his single-seater debut in 2022, signing up to drive in the Italian F4 Championship with AS Motorsport alongside Manuel Quondamcarlo. He ended up taking a best result of 18th, which he managed in the first two races at the Red Bull Ring, and having ended the season as part of the R-ace GP outfit, finished 43rd in the overall standings.

=== Formula Regional ===
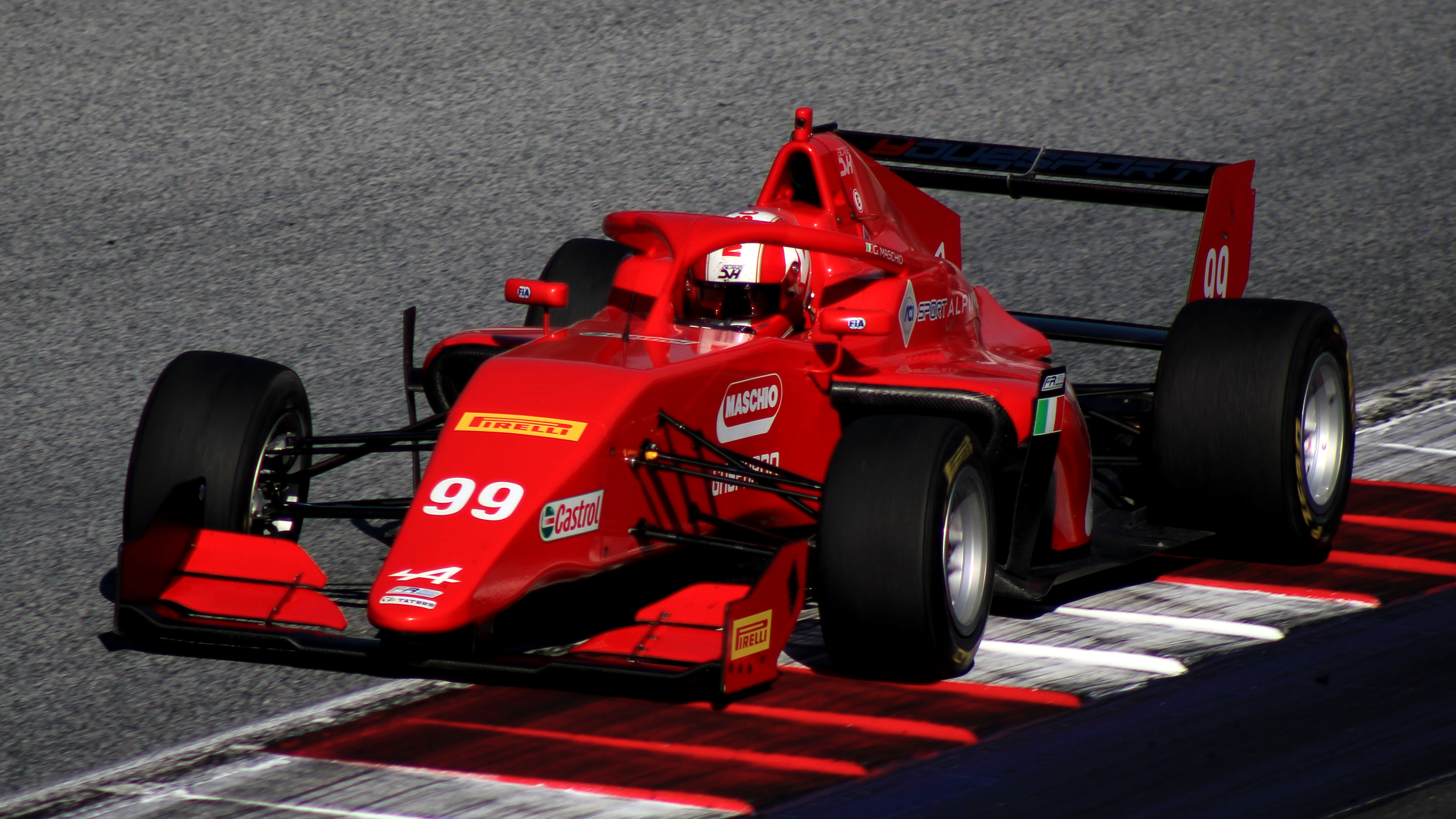
Maschio racing in the 2023 Formula Regional European Championship at the Red Bull Ring.

==== 2023 ====
At the start of the 2023 season, Maschio competed in the Formula Regional Middle East Championship with R&B Racing to prepare for his season in the European Championship, which he would contest with Monolite Racing.

For his main campaign, Maschio was signed by Monolite Racing to compete in the Formula Regional European Championship. He took a best finish of 17th in Mugello, placing 34th in the overall standings.

==== 2024 ====
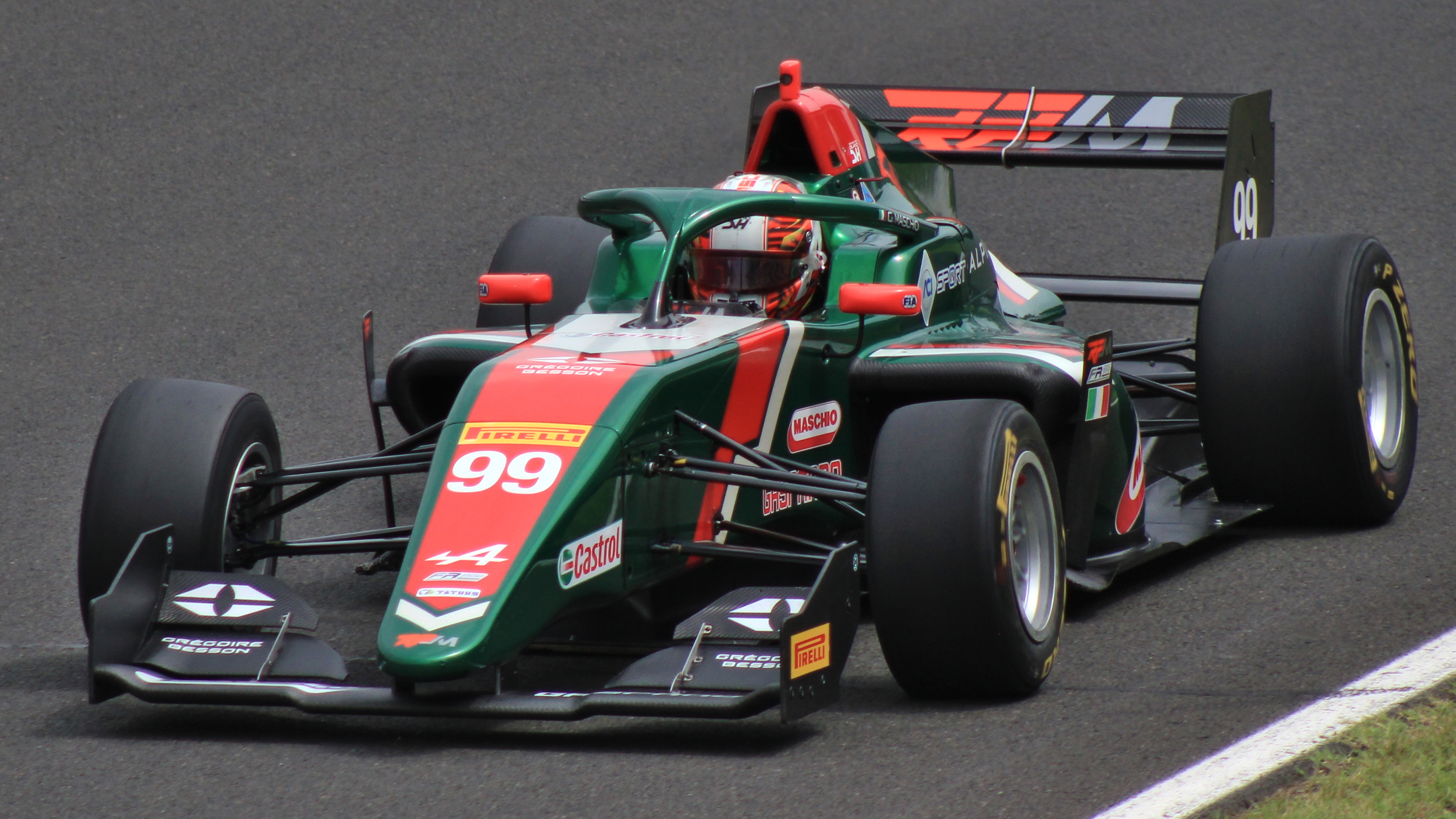
Maschio driving at the Hungaroring during the 2024 Formula Regional European Championship

At the start of 2024, Maschio returned to the Formula Regional Middle East Championship with Pinnacle Motorsport. His sole points finish came with ninth place at the Yas Marina Circuit, where he placed 21st in the standings.

For his main campaign, Maschio switched to RPM in his second season in the Formula Regional European Championship. His campaign was almost a mirror of his Middle East campaign, scoring one points finish with tenth place at Circuit Paul Ricard, which put him 24th in the standings.

==== 2025 ====
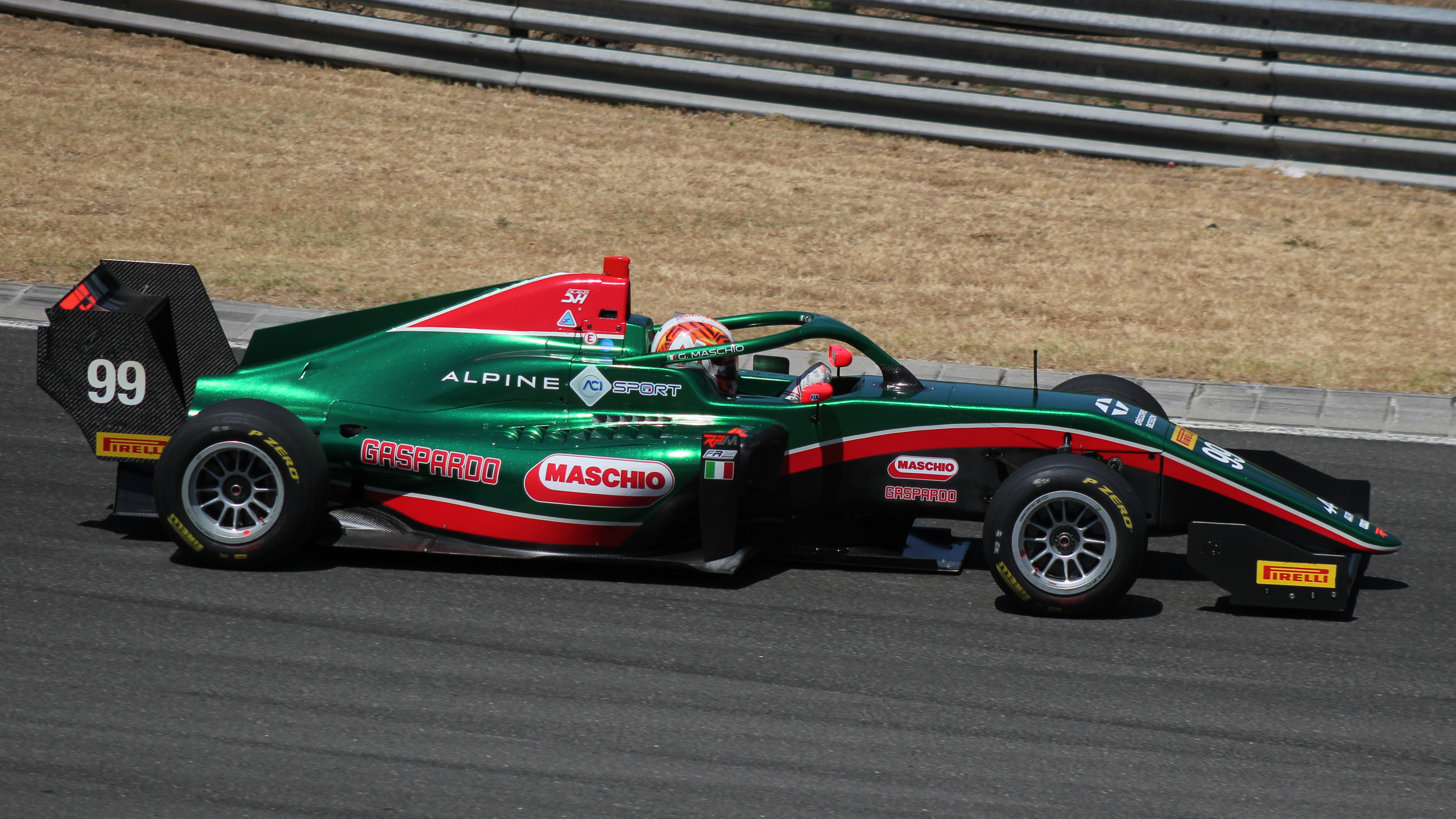
Maschio driving at the Hungaroring during the 2025 Formula Regional European Championship

Maschio returned to the Formula Regional Middle East Championship for 2025, with Pinnacle Motorsport for the first two rounds. He managed to score a point during the final race of the second Yas Marina round, where he finished in 12th, thereby finishing 23rd in the standings.

Maschio remained with RPM for his third season in the Formula Regional European Championship. He was barely able to improve from the previous year, but took his personal best finish in the series with eighth in Spa-Francorchamps. His second and final points finish of the year came in Monza, and he placed 17th in the overall standings with six points.

==== 2026 ====
During 2026 pre-season, Maschio raced in the Formula Regional Middle East Trophy with RPM.

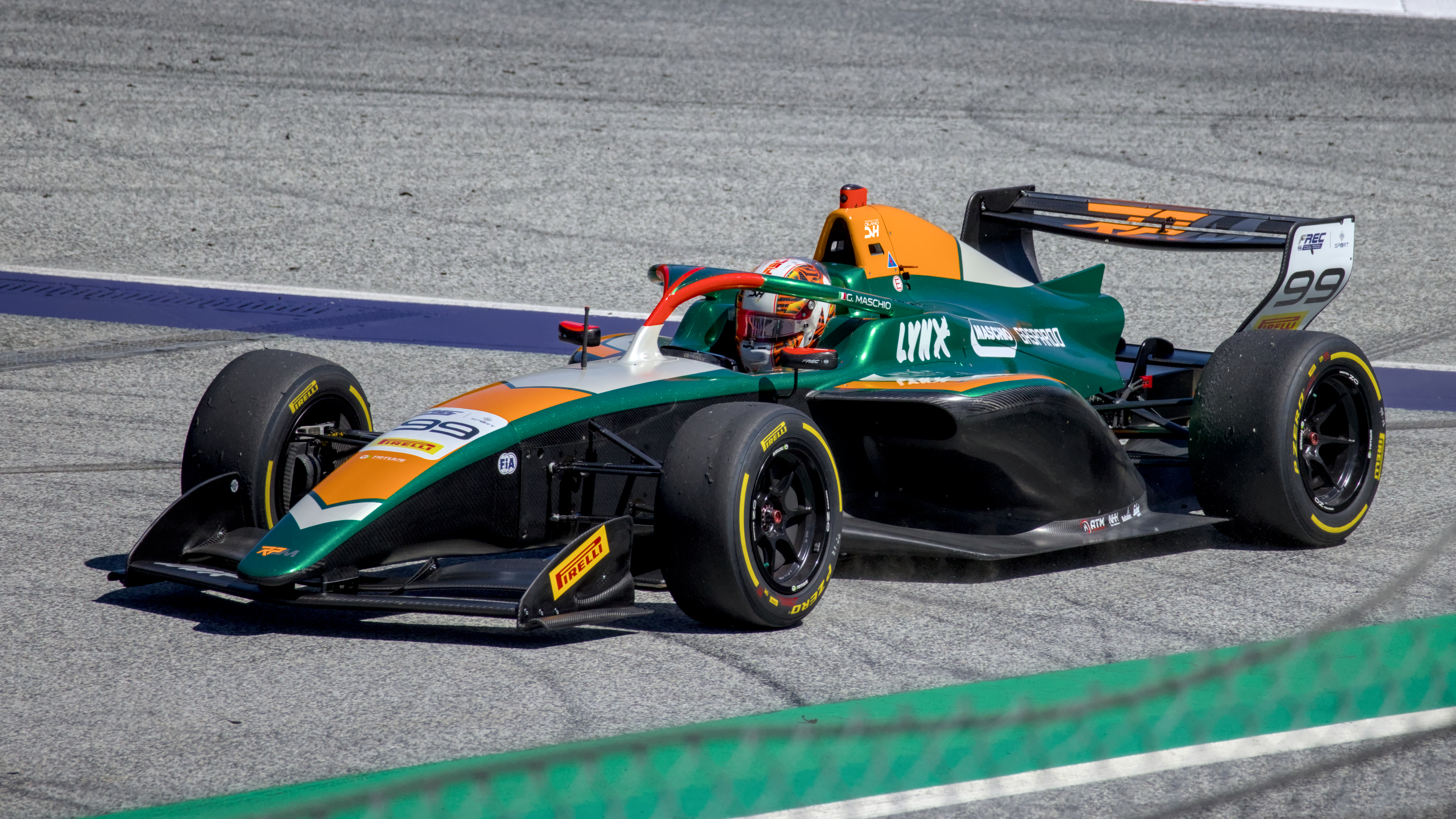
Maschio driving at the Red Bull Ring during the 2026 Formula Regional European Championship

Maschio returned to the Formula Regional European Championship with RPM for a fourth season in 2026. He was replaced by Lewis Wherrell for the final round in Hockenheim to compete in the Le Mans Cup Silverstone round, ending his streak of competing in every FREC round since the opening 2023 round.

== Racing record ==
=== Racing career summary ===
Season	Series	Team	Races	Wins	Poles	F/Laps	Podiums	Points	Position
2022	Italian F4 Championship	AS Motorsport	13	0	0	0	0	0	44th
2022	Italian F4 Championship	R-ace GP	3	0	0	0	0	0	44th
2022	Italian Prototype Championship	Bad Wolves	4	0	0	0	0	0	NC
2022	ACCR Formula 4 Trophy	MDR Events	1	0	0	0	0	12	7th
2022	FX Pro Series	MDR Events	3	1	0	2	3	0	NC†
2023	Formula Regional Middle East Championship	R&B Racing	15	0	0	0	0	0	30th
2023	Formula Regional European Championship	Monolite Racing	20	0	0	0	0	0	34th
2024	Formula Regional Middle East Championship	Pinnacle Motorsport	15	0	0	0	0	2	21st
2024	Formula Regional European Championship	RPM	20	0	0	0	0	1	24th
2025	Formula Regional Middle East Championship	Pinnacle Motorsport	6	0	0	0	0	1	23rd
2025	Formula Regional European Championship	RPM	20	0	0	0	0	6	17th
2026	Formula Regional Middle East Trophy	RPM	11	0	0	0	0	0	32nd
2026	Formula Regional European Championship	RPM	17	0	0	0	0	0	35th
2026	Le Mans Cup - LMP3	23Events Racing	6	1	0	0	2	45	5th
2026–27	Asian Le Mans Cup – LMP3 Pro	23Events Racing							

† Guest participation ineligible to score points.
^{*} Season still in progress.

=== Complete Italian F4 Championship results ===
(key) (Races in bold indicate pole position) (Races in italics indicate fastest lap)

Year	Team	1	2	3	4	5	6	7	8	9	10	11	12	13	14	15	16	17	18	19	20	21	22	DC	Points
2022	AS Motorsport	IMO; 1 Ret	IMO; 2; 28	IMO; 3; 21	MIS; 1; 25	MIS; 2; 28	MIS; 3; 26	SPA; 1	SPA; 2	SPA; 3	VLL; 1; 31	VLL; 2; 28	VLL; 3; 30	RBR; 1; 18	RBR; 2; 18	RBR; 3	RBR; 4; 32	MNZ; 1 Ret	MNZ; 2 DNS	MNZ; 3 C				44th	0
2022	R-ace GP																				MUG; 1 Ret	MUG; 2 Ret	MUG; 3; 25	44th	0

=== Complete Formula Regional Middle East Championship/Trophy results ===
(key) (Races in bold indicate pole position) (Races in italics indicate fastest lap)

Year	Entrant	1	2	3	4	5	6	7	8	9	10	11	12	13	14	15	DC	Points
2023	R&B Racing	DUB1; 1; 20	DUB1; 2; 19	DUB1; 3; 24	KUW1; 1; 11	KUW1; 2; 18	KUW1; 3; 15	KUW2; 1; 17	KUW2; 2; 17	KUW2; 3; 18	DUB2; 1; 24†	DUB2; 2 Ret	DUB2; 3; 19	ABU; 1; 24†	ABU; 2 Ret	ABU; 3; 19†	30th	0
2024	Pinnacle Motorsport	YMC1; 1; 23	YMC1; 2; 20	YMC1; 3; 25†	YMC2; 1; 18	YMC2; 2; 23	YMC2; 3; 17	DUB1; 1; 24	DUB1; 2; 23†	DUB1; 3; 15	YMC3; 1; 12	YMC3; 2; 9	YMC3; 3 Ret	DUB2; 1; 19	DUB2; 2; 19	DUB2; 3; 20	21st	2
2025	Pinnacle Motorsport	YMC1; 1; 19	YMC1; 2 Ret	YMC1; 3; 15	YMC2; 1; 21	YMC2; 2; 15	YMC2; 3; 12	DUB; 1	DUB; 2	DUB; 3	YMC3; 1	YMC3; 2	YMC3; 3	LUS; 1	LUS; 2	LUS; 3	23rd	1
2026	RPM	YMC1; 1; 25	YMC1; 2; 15	YMC1; 3 Ret	YMC2; 1; 19	YMC2; 2; 23	YMC2; 3; 24	DUB; 1 Ret	DUB; 2; 24	DUB; 3; 21	LUS; 1; 30	LUS; 2 C	LUS; 3; 24				32nd	0

=== Complete Formula Regional European Championship results ===
(key) (Races in bold indicate pole position) (Races in italics indicate fastest lap)

Year	Team	1	2	3	4	5	6	7	8	9	10	11	12	13	14	15	16	17	18	19	20	DC	Points
2023	Monolite Racing	IMO; 1; 28	IMO; 2; 21	CAT; 1; 25	CAT; 2; 30†	HUN; 1; 31	HUN; 2 Ret	SPA; 1; 24	SPA; 2; 29	MUG; 1; 27	MUG; 2; 17	LEC; 1; 27	LEC; 2; 25	RBR; 1; 31	RBR; 2; 22	MNZ; 1 Ret	MNZ; 2; 29	ZAN; 1 Ret	ZAN; 2 Ret	HOC; 1; 23	HOC; 2 Ret	34th	0
2024	RPM	HOC; 1; 20	HOC; 2; 15	SPA; 1 Ret	SPA; 2; 16	ZAN; 1; 19	ZAN; 2; 21	HUN; 1; 18	HUN; 2; 20	MUG; 1 Ret	MUG; 2; 23	LEC; 1; 26	LEC; 2; 10	IMO; 1; 21	IMO; 2 Ret	RBR; 1; 14	RBR; 2; 13	CAT; 1; 17	CAT; 2; 22	MNZ; 1 Ret	MNZ; 2; 17	24th	1
2025	RPM	MIS; 1; 16	MIS; 2 Ret	SPA; 1; 13	SPA; 2; 8	ZAN; 1; 23	ZAN; 2; 25	HUN; 1; 16	HUN; 2; 23	LEC; 1; 12	LEC; 2 Ret	IMO; 1; 18	IMO; 2 Ret	RBR; 1; 20	RBR; 2; 20	CAT; 1; 21	CAT; 2 Ret	HOC; 1; 15	HOC; 2; 25	MNZ; 1; 15	MNZ; 2; 12	17th	6
2026	RPM	RBR; 1; 20	RBR; 2; 21	RBR; 3; 24†	ZAN; 1 Ret	ZAN; 2 Ret	SPA; 1; 15	SPA; 2 C	SPA; 3; 19	MNZ; 1; 21	MNZ; 2; 15	MNZ; 3; 15	HUN; 1; 20	HUN; 2; 21	LEC; 1; 21	LEC; 2; 23	IMO; 1; 20	IMO; 2; 18	IMO; 3 Ret	HOC; 1	HOC; 2	35th	0

=== Complete Le Mans Cup results ===
(key) (Races in bold indicate pole position; results in italics indicate fastest lap)

Year	Entrant	Class	Chassis	1	2	3	4	5	6	Rank	Points
2026	23Events Racing	LMP3	Ligier JS P325	BAR; 2	LEC; 1	LMS; Ret	SPA; 9	SIL; 13	POR; Ret	5th	45

^{*} Season still in progress.
