= Macéo Capietto =

French racing driver (born 2006)

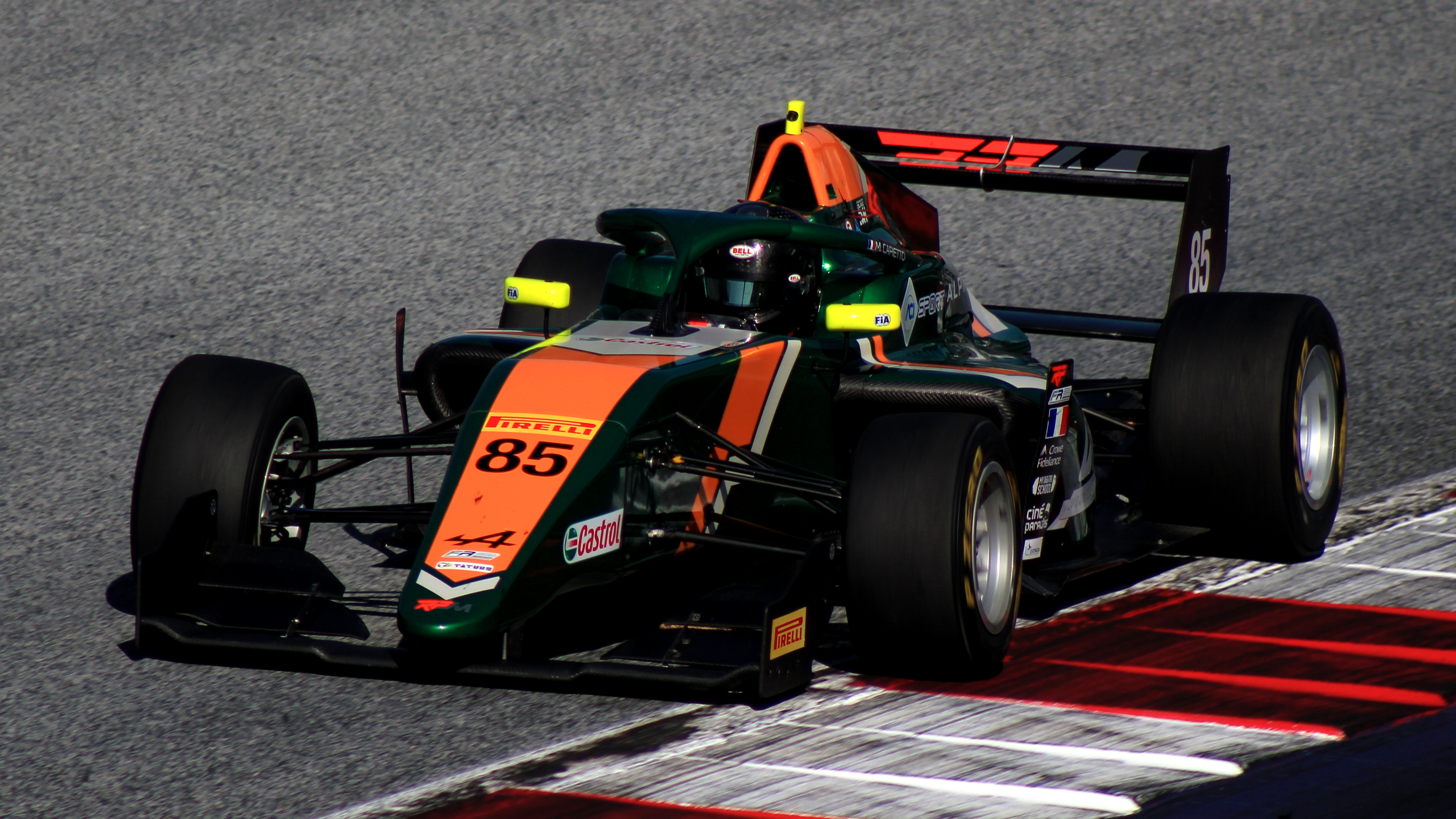
- Capietto racing in the 2023 Formula Regional European Championship at the Red Bull Ring.
- Nationality: (France) French
- Born: 12 January 2006 (age 20) Montereau, France
- Relatives: Guillaume Capietto (father)

European Le Mans Series career
- Debut season: 2024
- Current team: Iron Lynx - Proton
- Categorisation: FIA Silver (2024–2025); FIA Gold (2026–)
- Car number: 9
- Starts: 9 (9 entries)
- Wins: 1
- Podiums: 1
- Poles: 1
- Fastest laps: 0
- Best finish: 9th in 2024

Previous series
- 2022-2023, 2025 2021 2021: Formula Regional European Championship; French F4 Championship; Italian F4 Championship

Macéo Capietto (born 12 January 2006) is a French racing driver competing in the European Le Mans Series in LMP2 for DKR Engineering.

== Early and personal life ==
Born in Montereau and based in Veneux-les-Sablons, Capietto has spent all his life in the Île-de-France, the most populous region of France. He is the son of Prema Racing team manager and former karting driver Guillaume Capietto, and To-Play founder Wanessa Capietto. He now lives in the south of Paris where he studies automotive engineering at ESTACA, whilst pursuing his motorsport career.

== Junior racing career ==
=== Karting ===
Following in the footsteps of his father, Capietto started competing in karting from a very young age. After spending two seasons in Minikart, in which he came third in the French Cup, he graduated to Minimes where he became the regional Île-de-France champion. In 2018, he moved onto the international scene where he was coached by Anthoine Hubert. He came runner-up to Esteban Masson in the 2019 French Junior Karting Championship, and in his last year of karting, driving for Kosmic Racing, he came sixth in the World Junior Championship having fought for the podium in the early stages and working his way back up the order after a mid-race off track excursion. The same year, he finished runner-up to Connor Zilisch in the Karting Academy Trophy.

=== Formula 4 ===
In 2021, Capietto joined the French F4 Championship to make his single-seater debut. Despite his inexperience, he achieved his first F4 victory in only his fourth race at the Magny-Cours circuit. Taking four wins across the season and leading the championship entering the last round, ahead of title rival Esteban Masson. Having won the FIA Championship the previous day, Capietto needed to finish ahead of his rival to win the French Championship. After a race long battle between Hugh Barther and Masson, Capietto caught up to the leading group. In a last lap scrap with Barther, Capietto ended up coming together in controversial fashion with Masson: pole-sitting Masson remained in the lead of the race and the standings until the last lap when the pair collided, putting Masson out of the race and provisionally handing Capietto the title. However, following an investigation by the race stewards, Capietto was later disqualified from all results of that weekend and thus stripped of both titles. He ended up third in the standings, behind champion Masson and Hugh Barter, and therefore losing both the super licence points and the championship winning bonus of 100k€.

In late 2021, Capietto also made two appearances in the Italian F4 Championship with Prema Powerteam. He scored two rookie podiums in the final round of the season at Monza climbing more than 50 positions over the three races.

=== Formula Regional ===
==== 2022 ====
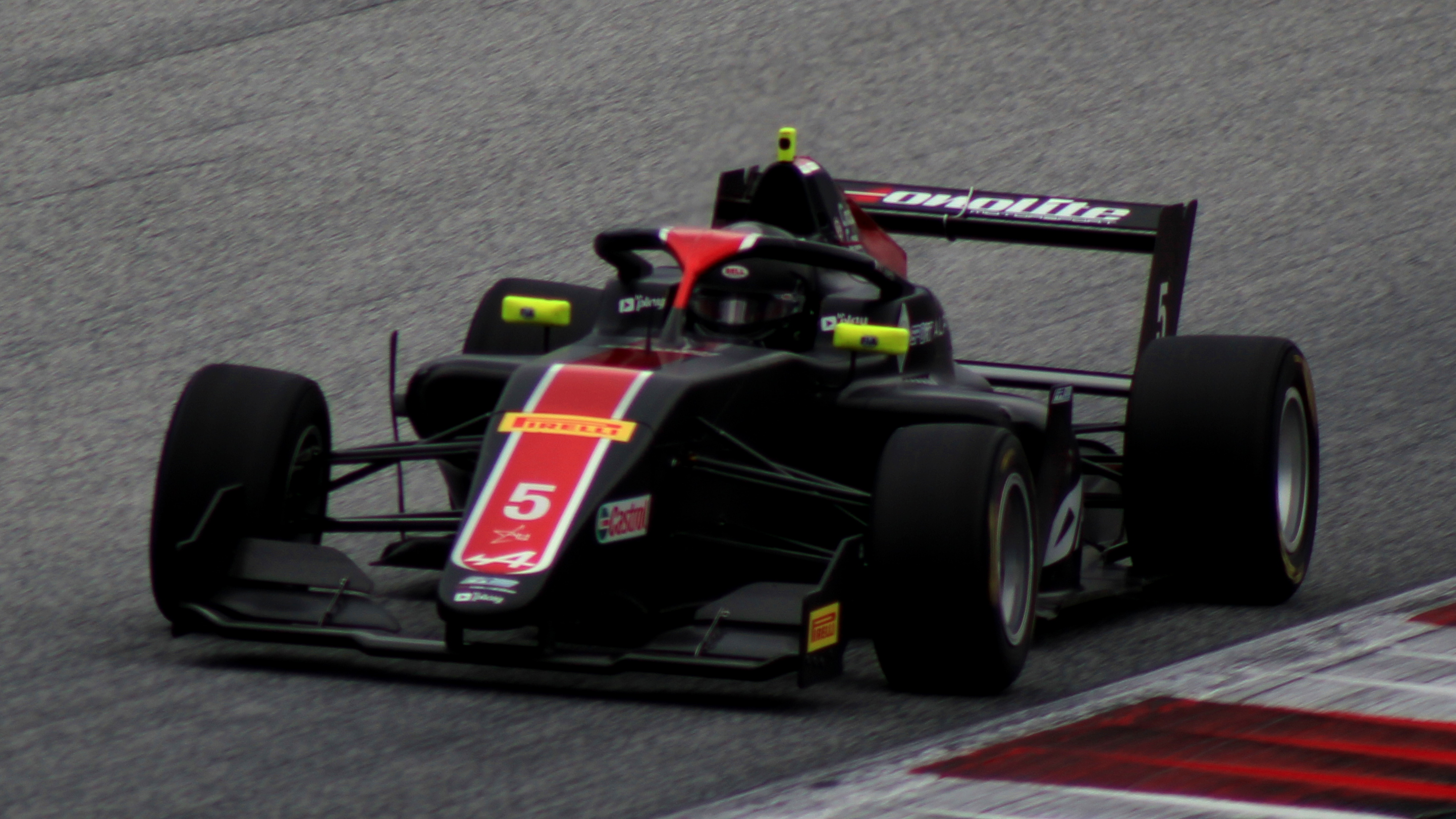
Capietto racing in the 2022 Formula Regional European Championship at the Red Bull Ring.

After testing for several teams during the winter, Capietto moved into the Formula Regional European Championship in 2022, partnering Pietro Armanni and Cenyu Han at Monolite Racing. He was the only driver to score points for the team this season, with a best result of seventh in Mugello and a best qualifying of sixth in Spielberg.

==== 2023 ====
Capietto switched to Race Performance Motorsport for the 2023 Formula Regional European Championship. Where he scored a his maiden FRECA podium and finished 8th in the standings.

==== 2025 ====
Capietto was set to return to the Formula Regional European Championship in 2025 with CL Motorsport, for the second and final four rounds of the championship. However, he has since only appeared in the second round, but did return to the series during the eighth round in Barcelona with RPM.

== Endurance racing career ==
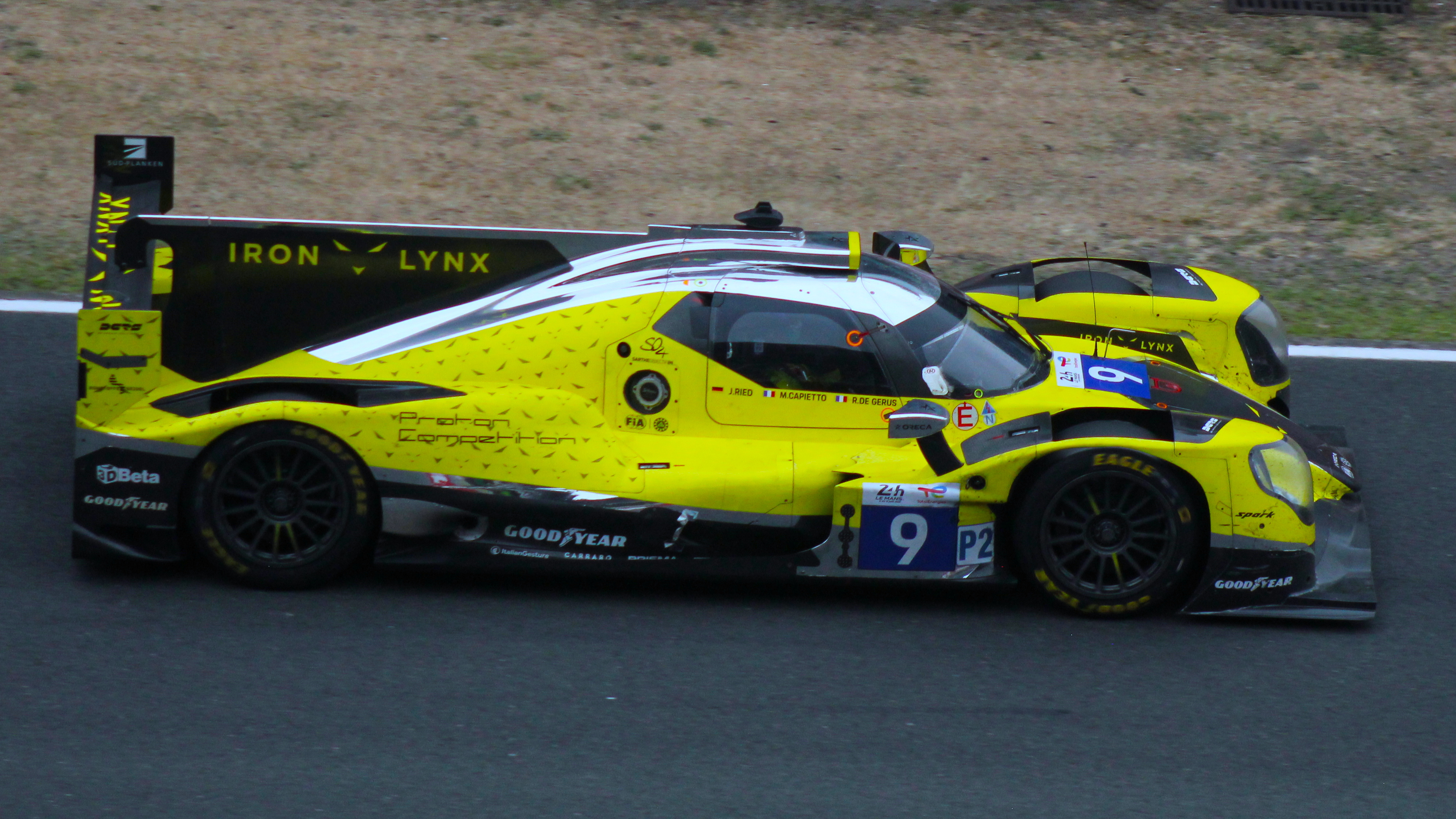
Capietto's No. 9 car at the 2025 24 Hours of Le Mans

=== 2024: ELMS & Le Mans debut ===
For 2024, Capietto competed in the 2024 European Le Mans Series with Iron Lynx-Proton for the LMP2 class. He would be partnered alongside Matteo Cairoli and Jonas Ried. He would take his first win in the series during the 4 Hours of Mugello after storming from sixth to first during the first part of his stint.

In 2024, Capietto participated in his first 24h of Le Mans where he briefly led during the first hour before having to retire at the beginning of the night due to an electrical issue.

== Karting record ==
=== Karting career summary ===
Season	Series	Team	Position
2013	Challenge Rotax Max France — Mini Kart		25th
2014	Coupe de France — Mini Kart		NC
2014	Championnat Regional Île-de-France — Mini Kart		10th
2015	Trophée Interclub — Mini Kart		4th
2015	Coupe de France — Mini Kart		**3rd**
2015	Championnat de France — Mini Kart		4th
2016	Championnat de France — Minime		14th
2016	Coupe de France — Minime		4th
2017	Coupe de France — Cadet		5th
2017	Championnat de France — Cadet		12th
2017	National Series Karting — Cadet		8th
2018	WSK Super Master Series — OKJ	KR Motorsport	86th
2018	Championnat de France — Junior		7th
2018	CIK-FIA European Championship — OKJ	KR Motorsport	71st
2018	CIK-FIA World Championship — OKJ	KR Motorsport	53rd
2018	WSK Final Cup — OKJ	KR Motorsport	30th
2019	Coupe de France — OKJ		16th
2019	Championnat de France — Junior		**2nd**
2019	Championnat de France — Nationale		9th
2019	CIK-FIA European Championship — OKJ	KR Motorsport	18th
2019	CIK-FIA World Championship — OKJ	KR Motorsport	25th
2020	South Garda Winter Cup — OKJ	Pantano Team	22nd
2020	WSK Super Master Series — OKJ	Pantano Team	18th
2020	CIK-FIA European Championship — OKJ	Pantano Team	50th
2020	WSK Euro Series — OKJ	Kosmic Racing Departement	12th
2020	CIK-FIA Academy Trophy	Capietto, Guillaume	**2nd**
2020	Champions of the Future — OKJ		40th
2020	CIK-FIA World Championship — OKJ	Kosmic Racing Departement	6th

=== Complete CIK-FIA Karting European Championship results ===
(key) (Races in bold indicate pole position) (Races in italics indicate fastest lap)

Year	Team	Class	1	2	3	4	5	6	7	8	DC	Points
2018	KR Motorsport Srl	OKJ	SAR; QH; 74	SAR; R DNQ	PFI; QH; 55	PFI; R DNQ	AMP; QH; 58	AMP; R DNQ	LEM; QH; 52	LEM; R DNQ	71st	0
2019	KR Motorsport Srl	OKJ	ANG; QH; 9	ANG; R NR	GEN; QH; 7	GEN; R 7	KRI; QH; 46	KRI; R DNQ	LEM; QH; 38	LEM; R DNQ	18th	15
2020	Pantano Team	OKJ	ZUE; QH; 43	ZUE; R DNQ	SAR; QH; 38	SAR; R DNQ	WAC; QH; WD	WAC; R WD			50th	0

== Racing record ==
=== Racing career summary ===
Season	Series	Team	Races	Wins	Poles	F/Laps	Podiums	Points	Position
2021	French F4 Championship	FFSA Academy	19	4	3	6	10	203	**3rd**
2021	Italian F4 Championship	Prema Powerteam	6	0	0	0	0	2	30th
2022	Formula Regional European Championship	Monolite Racing	20	0	0	0	0	12	22nd
2023	Formula Regional European Championship	RPM	20	0	0	0	1	77	8th
2024	European Le Mans Series - LMP2	Iron Lynx - Proton	6	1	1	0	1	36	8th
2024	24 Hours of Le Mans - LMP2	Proton Competition	1	0	0	0	0	N/A	DNF
2025	European Le Mans Series - LMP2	Iron Lynx - Proton	6	0	1	1	0	35	9th
2025	24 Hours of Le Mans - LMP2	Iron Lynx - Proton	1	0	0	0	0	N/A	4th
2025	Formula Regional European Championship	CL Motorsport	2	0	0	0	0	0	32nd
2025	Formula Regional European Championship	RPM	2	0	0	0	0	0	32nd
2026	Porsche Carrera Cup France	Martinet by Alméras	12	1	0	1	7	187	**3rd**
2026	European Le Mans Series - LMP2 Pro-Am	DKR Engineering	2	0	0	0	0	6	15th
2026	Porsche Carrera Cup Asia	BWT Shanghai Yongda	3	0	0	0	2	0	NC†

* Season still in progress.

=== Complete French F4 Championship results ===
(key) (Races in bold indicate pole position) (Races in italics indicate fastest lap)

Year	1	2	3	4	5	6	7	8	9	10	11	12	13	14	15	16	17	18	19	20	21	Pos.	Points
2021	NOG; 1 DNS	NOG; 2; 8	NOG; 3; 2	MAG1; 1; 1	MAG1; 2; 13	MAG1; 3; 3	HUN; 1; 2	HUN; 2; 8	**HUN**; **3**; 1	**LÉD**; **1**; 1	LÉD; 2; 7	LÉD; 3; 2	**MNZ**; **1**; 2	MNZ; 2; 2	MNZ; 3 C	LEC; 1; 1	LEC; 2; 5	LEC; 3; 4	MAG2; 1 DSQ	MAG2; 2 DSQ	MAG2; 3 DSQ	3rd	203

=== Complete Italian F4 Championship results ===
(key) (Races in bold indicate pole position) (Races in italics indicate fastest lap)

Year	Team	1	2	3	4	5	6	7	8	9	10	11	12	13	14	15	16	17	18	19	20	21	Pos.	Points
2021	Prema Powerteam	LEC; 1	LEC; 2	LEC; 3	MIS; 1	MIS; 2	MIS; 3	VLL; 1	VLL; 2	VLL; 3	IMO; 1; 17	IMO; 2 Ret	IMO; 3; 13	RBR; 1	RBR; 2	RBR; 3	MUG; 1	MUG; 2	MUG; 3	MNZ; 1; 30†	MNZ; 2; 14	MNZ; 3; 9	32nd	2

=== Complete Formula Regional European Championship results ===
(key) (Races in bold indicate pole position) (Races in italics indicate fastest lap)

Year	Team	1	2	3	4	5	6	7	8	9	10	11	12	13	14	15	16	17	18	19	20	Pos.	Points
2022	Monolite Racing	MNZ; 1; 12	MNZ; 2; 10	IMO; 1; 13	IMO; 2; 9	MCO; 1; 13	MCO; 2 Ret	LEC; 1; 26	LEC; 2 Ret	ZAN; 1; 16	ZAN; 2; 9	HUN; 1; 26	HUN; 2; 10	SPA; 1; 19	SPA; 2; 16	RBR; 1; 16	RBR; 2; 28	CAT; 1; 23	CAT; 2; 20	MUG; 1; 7	MUG; 2; 18	22nd	12
2023	RPM	IMO; 1 Ret	IMO; 2; 9	CAT; 1; 5	CAT; 2; 7	HUN; 1; 10	HUN; 2; 3	SPA; 1; 6	SPA; 2; 8	MUG; 1; 8	MUG; 2; 6	LEC; 1; 21	LEC; 2; 10	RBR; 1; 8	RBR; 2; 13	MNZ; 1 Ret	MNZ; 2; 12	ZAN; 1; 10	ZAN; 2; 13	HOC; 1; 7	HOC; 2; 10	8th	77
2025	CL Motorsport	MIS; 1	MIS; 2	SPA; 1 Ret	SPA; 2; 19	ZAN; 1	ZAN; 2	HUN; 1	HUN; 2	LEC; 1	LEC; 2	IMO; 1	IMO; 2	RBR; 1	RBR; 2							32nd	0
2025	RPM															CAT; 1; 19	CAT; 2; 17	HOC; 1	HOC; 2	MNZ; 1	MNZ; 2	32nd	0

=== Complete European Le Mans Series results ===
(key) (Races in bold indicate pole position; results in italics indicate fastest lap)

Year	Entrant	Class	Chassis	Engine	1	2	3	4	5	6	Rank	Points
2024	Iron Lynx - Proton	LMP2	Oreca 07	Gibson GK428 4.2 L V8	CAT; Ret	LEC; 9	IMO; Ret	SPA; 7	**MUG**; 1	ALG; 9	8th	36
2025	Iron Lynx - Proton	LMP2	Oreca 07	Gibson GK428 4.2 L V8	CAT; 11	LEC; Ret	IMO; 4	SPA; 8	SIL; 7	**ALG**; 4	9th	35
2026	DKR Engineering	LMP2 Pro-Am	Oreca 07	Gibson GK428 4.2 L V8	CAT	LEC	IMO; 8	SPA	SIL; 9	ALG	15th	6

=== Complete 24 Hours of Le Mans results ===
Year	Team	Co-Drivers	Car	Class	Laps	Pos.	Class Pos.
2024	(Germany) Proton Competition	(Germany) Jonas Ried (Netherlands) Bent Viscaal	Oreca 07-Gibson	LMP2	86	DNF	DNF
2025	(Germany) Iron Lynx – Proton	(France) Reshad de Gerus (Germany) Jonas Ried	Oreca 07-Gibson	LMP2	365	21st	4th
