= 2022 Formula Regional European Championship =

Motor racing competition

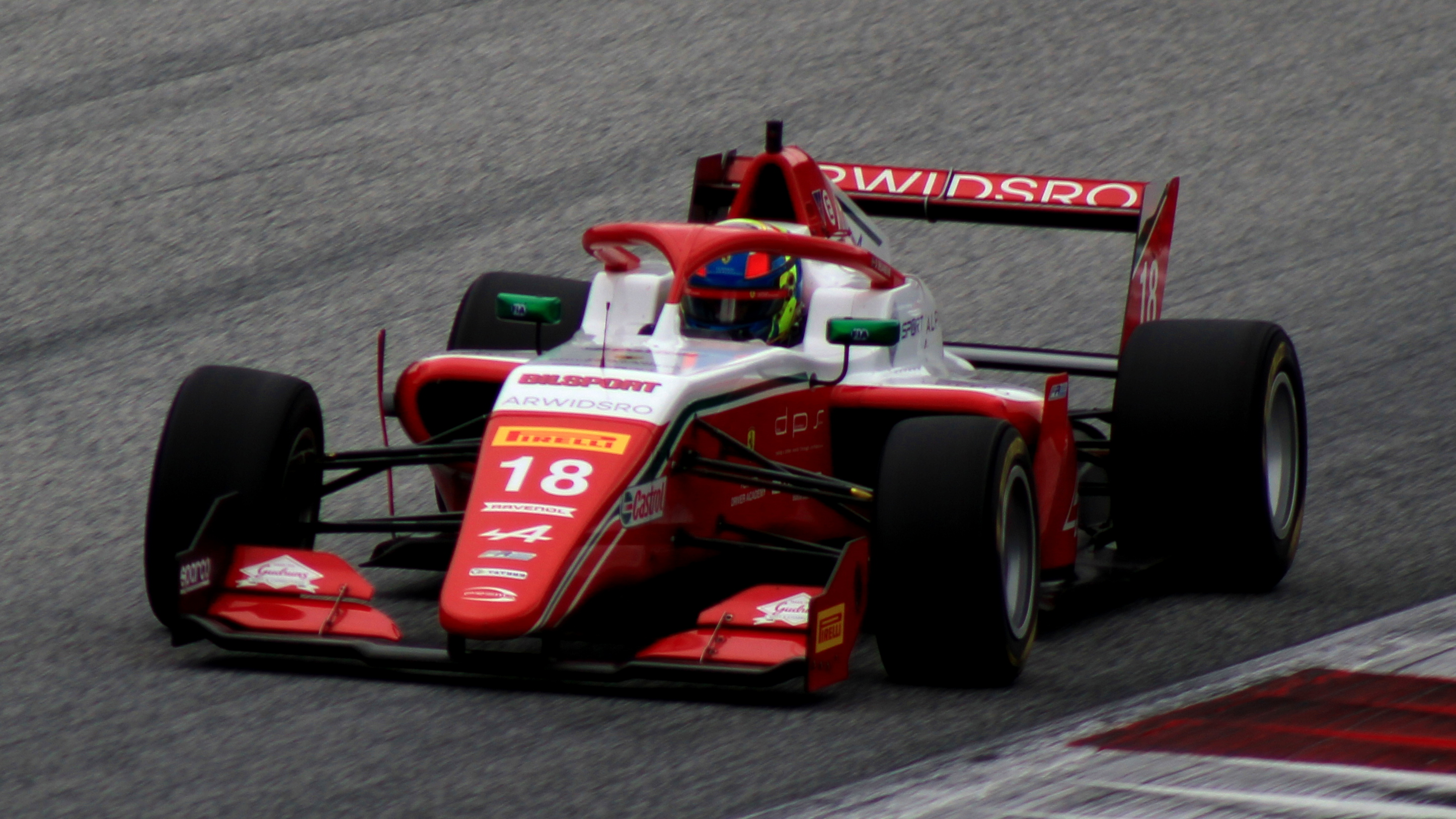
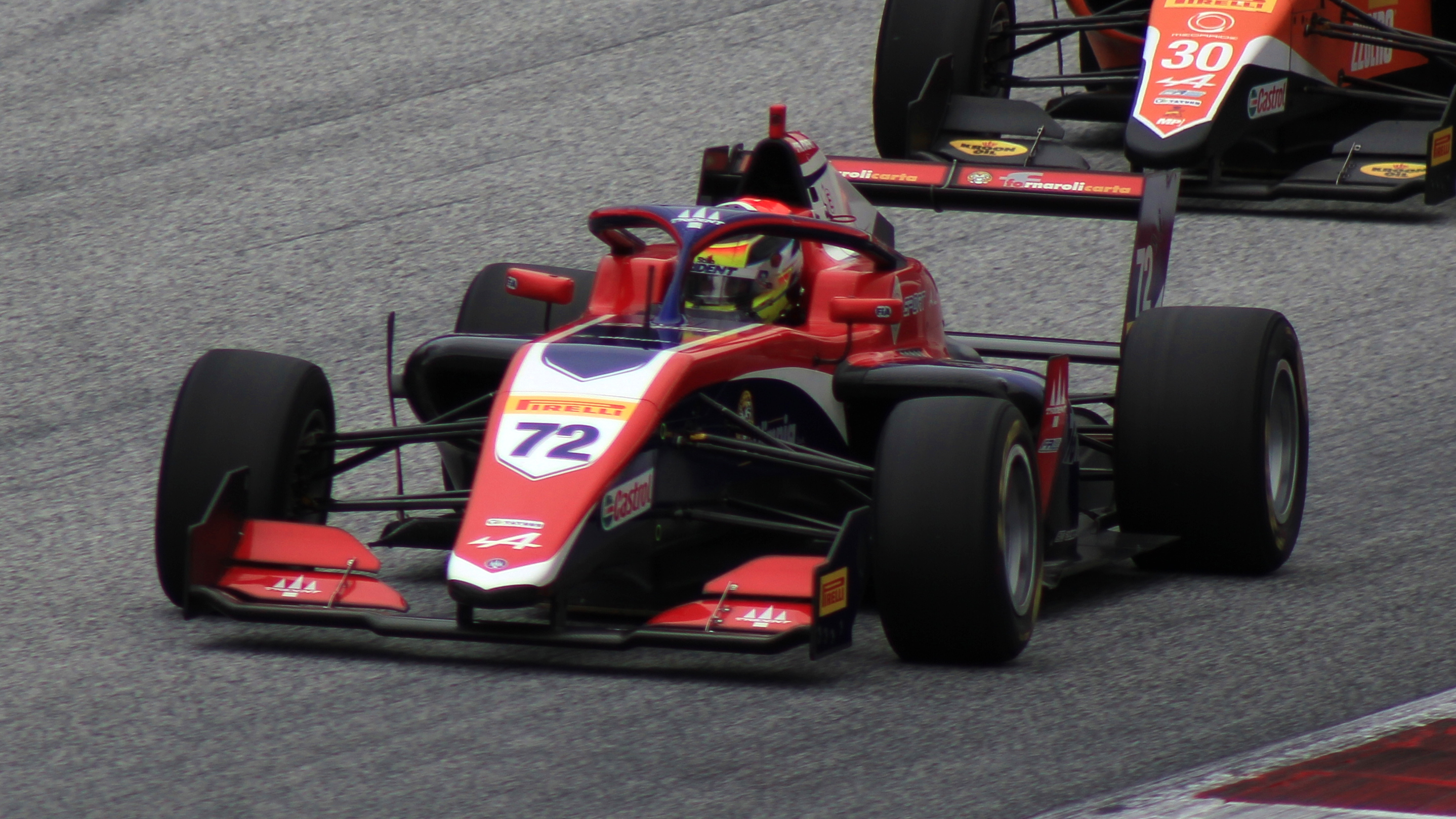
Dino Beganovic, driving for Prema Racing, won the Drivers' Championship while Leonardo Fornaroli, driving for Trident, won the Rookie Championship.

The 2022 Formula Regional European Championship by Alpine was a multi-event, Formula Regional open-wheel single seater motor racing championship held across Europe. The championship featured a mix of professional and amateur drivers, competing in Formula Regional cars that conform to the FIA's Formula Regional regulations for the championship. This was the fourth season of the championship and the second after a merger with Formula Renault Eurocup which resulted to the change of the engine supplier to Alpine. The season commenced on 22 April at Autodromo Nazionale Monza and concluded on 23 October at Mugello Circuit, after ten rounds.

Prema Racing won their third teams' championship at Barcelona, with two races to spare. Their driver Dino Beganovic won the drivers' championship, with one race to spare. Leonardo Fornaroli, driving for Trident, won the rookie title.

== Teams and drivers ==
Twelve teams were pre-selected on 12 November 2021; JD Motorsport's entry and assets were taken over by Trident. On 23 February 2022, new team Race Performance Motorsport (RPM) was announced to have taken over DR Formula's entry.

Teams	No.	Driver	Status	Rounds
(Italy) Prema Racing	3	(Estonia) Paul Aron		All
(Italy) Prema Racing	18	(Sweden) Dino Beganovic		All
(Italy) Prema Racing	58	(Colombia) Sebastián Montoya	R	All
(Italy) Prema Racing	88	(United Arab Emirates) Hamda Al Qubaisi	F	1–8
(Italy) Prema Racing	88	(United Arab Emirates) Amna Al Qubaisi	G F	9–10
(Italy) Trident	4	(Poland) Roman Biliński (Note: Biliński is a Polish-British driver who competed under a British licence in rounds 1–7 and a Polish licence in rounds 8–10.)	R	All
(Italy) Trident	70	(Germany) Tim Tramnitz	R	All
(Italy) Trident	72	(Italy) Leonardo Fornaroli	R	All
(Italy) Monolite Racing	5	(France) Macéo Capietto	R	All
(Italy) Monolite Racing	6	(Italy) Pietro Armanni	R	All
(Italy) Monolite Racing	24	(China) Cenyu Han	R	1–5
(Italy) Monolite Racing	24	(Italy) Nicola Marinangeli		7–10
(Switzerland) G4 Racing	7	(Switzerland) Axel Gnos		1–7, 9–10
(Switzerland) G4 Racing	7	(France) Gillian Henrion	G	8
(Switzerland) G4 Racing	8	(Peru) Matías Zagazeta	R	All
(Switzerland) G4 Racing	22	(Czech Republic) Tereza Bábíčková	G F	8
(Switzerland) G4 Racing	92	(France) Owen Tangavelou	R	1–5
(Spain) FA Racing by MP	9	(France) Esteban Masson	R	1–6
(Spain) FA Racing by MP	9	(Italy) Francesco Braschi	R	7–10
(Spain) FA Racing by MP	12	(France) Victor Bernier	R	All
(Spain) FA Racing by MP	35	(Colombia) Nicolás Baptiste	R	All
(United Kingdom) Arden Motorsport	10	(Paraguay) Joshua Dürksen	R	All
(United Kingdom) Arden Motorsport	19	(Mexico) Noel León	R	All
(United Kingdom) Arden Motorsport	91	(Brazil) Eduardo Barrichello		All
(Netherlands) Van Amersfoort Racing	11	(Hungary) Levente Révész		All
(Netherlands) Van Amersfoort Racing	13	(Switzerland) Joshua Dufek	R	All
(Netherlands) Van Amersfoort Racing	27	(Netherlands) Kas Haverkort		All
(France) R-ace GP	15	(Switzerland) Léna Bühler	F	1–3
(France) R-ace GP	16	(Spain) Lorenzo Fluxá		All
(France) R-ace GP	26	(France) Hadrien David		All
(France) R-ace GP	85	(Brazil) Gabriel Bortoleto		All
(Netherlands) MP Motorsport	17	(France) Sami Meguetounif	R	All
(Netherlands) MP Motorsport	30	Michael Belov (Note: Michael Belov is Russian, but he competes as a neutral competitor as Russian national emblems were banned by the FIA due to the Russian invasion of Ukraine.)		1–5
(Netherlands) MP Motorsport	30	(Spain) Mari Boya		7–10
(Netherlands) MP Motorsport	77	(Netherlands) Dilano van 't Hoff		1–3, 5, 7–10
(Netherlands) MP Motorsport	77	(Italy) Francesco Braschi	R	6
(Finland) KIC Motorsport	21	(Poland) Piotr Wiśnicki	R	1, 3–10
(Finland) KIC Motorsport	21	(Finland) Patrik Pasma		2
(Finland) KIC Motorsport	28	(Italy) Francesco Braschi	R	1–5
(Finland) KIC Motorsport	28	(Denmark) Sebastian Øgaard	G	8–10
(Finland) KIC Motorsport	68	(Mexico) Santiago Ramos	R	1–9
(Finland) KIC Motorsport	68	(Finland) William Alatalo	G	10
(France) ART Grand Prix	42	(Netherlands) Laurens van Hoepen	R	All
(France) ART Grand Prix	46	(Italy) Gabriele Minì		All
(France) ART Grand Prix	64	(Spain) Mari Boya		1–6
(France) ART Grand Prix	64	(France) Esteban Masson	R	7–10
(Italy) RPM	55	(Italy) Pietro Delli Guanti		1–7
(Italy) RPM	55	(France) Pierre-Louis Chovet	G	8–10
(Italy) RPM	65	(Republic of Ireland) Keith Donegan		1–5
(Italy) RPM	65	(France) Owen Tangavelou	R	6–10
(Italy) RPM	75	(Italy) Andrea Rosso		6
(Italy) RPM	75	(Mexico) Santiago Ramos	R	10

Icon	Status
R	Rookie
F	Female
G	Guest drivers ineligible for points

- Belén García was scheduled to compete for G4 Racing on a part-time basis, but withdrew prior to the start of the season.
- Kirill Smal was scheduled to compete for KIC Motorsport, but withdrew prior to the start of the season as a result of the Russian invasion of Ukraine.

== Race calendar ==
The calendar was revealed on 25 October 2021.

Round		Circuit	Date	Supporting
1	R1	(Italy) Autodromo Nazionale di Monza, Monza	23 April	Italian GT Championship
1	R2	(Italy) Autodromo Nazionale di Monza, Monza	24 April	Italian GT Championship
2	R1	(Italy) Imola Circuit, Imola	7 May	Main event
2	R2	(Italy) Imola Circuit, Imola	8 May	Main event
3	R1	Circuit de Monaco, Monte Carlo	28 May	Monaco Grand Prix
3	R2	Circuit de Monaco, Monte Carlo	29 May	Monaco Grand Prix
4	R1	(France) Circuit Paul Ricard, Le Castellet	4 June	GT World Challenge Europe Endurance Cup
4	R2	(France) Circuit Paul Ricard, Le Castellet	5 June	GT World Challenge Europe Endurance Cup
5	R1	(Netherlands) Circuit Zandvoort, Zandvoort	18 June	GT World Challenge Europe Sprint Cup
5	R2	(Netherlands) Circuit Zandvoort, Zandvoort	19 June	GT World Challenge Europe Sprint Cup
6	R1	(Hungary) Hungaroring, Mogyoród	9 July	International GT Open
6	R2	(Hungary) Hungaroring, Mogyoród	10 July	International GT Open
7	R1	(Belgium) Circuit de Spa-Francorchamps, Stavelot	29 July	Spa 24 Hours
7	R2	(Belgium) Circuit de Spa-Francorchamps, Stavelot	30 July	Spa 24 Hours
8	R1	(Austria) Red Bull Ring, Spielberg	10 September	International GT Open
8	R2	(Austria) Red Bull Ring, Spielberg	11 September	International GT Open
9	R1	(Spain) Circuit de Barcelona-Catalunya, Montmeló	15 October	International GT Open
9	R2	(Spain) Circuit de Barcelona-Catalunya, Montmeló	16 October	International GT Open
10	R1	(Italy) Mugello Circuit, Scarperia e San Piero	22 October	Italian GT Championship
10	R2	(Italy) Mugello Circuit, Scarperia e San Piero	23 October	Italian GT Championship

== Results ==
Round		Circuit	Pole position	Fastest lap	Winning driver	Winning team	Rookie winner
1	R1	(Italy) Monza	(Sweden) Dino Beganovic	(Sweden) Dino Beganovic	(Sweden) Dino Beganovic	(Italy) Prema Racing	(Colombia) Sebastián Montoya
1	R2	(Italy) Monza	(Estonia) Paul Aron	(Estonia) Paul Aron	(Estonia) Paul Aron	(Italy) Prema Racing	(Colombia) Sebastián Montoya
2	R1	(Italy) Imola	(Italy) Gabriele Minì	(Italy) Gabriele Minì	(Sweden) Dino Beganovic	(Italy) Prema Racing	(Colombia) Sebastián Montoya
2	R2	(Italy) Imola	(Italy) Gabriele Minì	(Sweden) Dino Beganovic	(Italy) Gabriele Minì	(France) ART Grand Prix	(Germany) Tim Tramnitz
3	R1	Monaco	(France) Hadrien David	(Spain) Mari Boya	(France) Hadrien David	(France) R-ace GP	(Netherlands) Laurens van Hoepen
3	R2	Monaco	(Sweden) Dino Beganovic	(Spain) Mari Boya	(Sweden) Dino Beganovic	(Italy) Prema Racing	(Netherlands) Laurens van Hoepen
4	R1	(France) Paul Ricard	(Sweden) Dino Beganovic	(Estonia) Paul Aron	(Estonia) Paul Aron	(Italy) Prema Racing	(Germany) Tim Tramnitz
4	R2	(France) Paul Ricard	(Italy) Gabriele Minì	(France) Hadrien David	(Italy) Gabriele Minì	(France) ART Grand Prix	(Poland) Roman Biliński
5	R1	(Netherlands) Zandvoort	(Estonia) Paul Aron	(France) Hadrien David	(Estonia) Paul Aron	(Italy) Prema Racing	(Colombia) Sebastián Montoya
5	R2	(Netherlands) Zandvoort	(Estonia) Paul Aron	(Estonia) Paul Aron	(Estonia) Paul Aron	(Italy) Prema Racing	(Colombia) Sebastián Montoya
6	R1	(Hungary) Hungaroring	(Netherlands) Kas Haverkort	(Netherlands) Kas Haverkort	(Netherlands) Kas Haverkort	(Netherlands) Van Amersfoort Racing	(Poland) Roman Biliński
6	R2	(Hungary) Hungaroring	(France) Hadrien David	(Italy) Gabriele Minì	(France) Hadrien David	(France) R-ace GP	(Germany) Tim Tramnitz
7	R1	(Belgium) Spa-Francorchamps	(Sweden) Dino Beganovic	(Estonia) Paul Aron	(Sweden) Dino Beganovic	(Italy) Prema Racing	(France) Sami Meguetounif
7	R2	(Belgium) Spa-Francorchamps	(Estonia) Paul Aron	(France) Hadrien David	(Brazil) Gabriel Bortoleto	(France) R-ace GP	(Germany) Tim Tramnitz
8	R1	(Austria) Red Bull Ring	(Estonia) Paul Aron	(Netherlands) Kas Haverkort	(Netherlands) Kas Haverkort	(Netherlands) Van Amersfoort Racing	(Switzerland) Joshua Dufek
8	R2	(Austria) Red Bull Ring	(France) Hadrien David	(Italy) Gabriele Minì	(France) Hadrien David	(France) R-ace GP	(Switzerland) Joshua Dufek
9	R1	(Spain) Barcelona	(Estonia) Paul Aron	(Brazil) Gabriel Bortoleto	(Estonia) Paul Aron	(Italy) Prema Racing	(Switzerland) Joshua Dufek
9	R2	(Spain) Barcelona	(Brazil) Gabriel Bortoleto	(France) Hadrien David	(Brazil) Gabriel Bortoleto	(France) R-ace GP	(Paraguay) Joshua Dürksen
10	R1	(Italy) Mugello	(Estonia) Paul Aron	(Italy) Gabriele Minì	(Estonia) Paul Aron	(Italy) Prema Racing	(France) Victor Bernier
10	R2	(Italy) Mugello	(Brazil) Gabriel Bortoleto	(Italy) Gabriele Minì	(Italy) Gabriele Minì	(France) ART Grand Prix	(France) Owen Tangavelou

== Season summary ==
=== First half ===
The fourth season of the championship began in late April at Monza with Dino Beganovic on pole for the wet season opener. He kept the lead at the start, while Lorenzo Fluxá next to him dropped back behind Gabriele Minì and Michael Belov, before repassing the Russian. A collision in turn one resulted in the first safety car. On the restart, Belov got Fluxá back while Minì collided with Beganovic, destroying his front wing and with it his chances for a points finish. The top three remained unchanged for the rest of the race, untroubled by two further safety car periods. Paul Aron claimed pole for the second race, and led from the start ahead of Minì, who was overtaken by Beganovic at the start. Aron's lead remained steady, he mastered two safety cars, one mid-race and one close to the end. Beganovic kept close to Aron, but was not able to challenge the leader. Still, his second place together with his win the day before meant he took the championship lead, 15 points ahead of Belov. Sebastián Montoya led the rookie standings.

The championship stayed in Italy, visiting Imola next, where Minì won pole for race one. He kept the lead all throughout a disrupted race: first, the race was stopped for Sami Meguetounif, who crashed heavy and had to be taken to hospital. On the restart, Beganovic claimed second place from Mari Boya, while leader Minì was handed a ten-second time penalty for a false start. Two more safety cars and another red flag, this time for Axel Gnos, saw the race to its end, promoting Beganovic to the win and Aron to the podium. Minì bounced back the day after to take another pole position. A safety car start for damp conditions saw him control the start ahead of Tim Tramnitz in second, before the German was passed by Beganovic, and then by Kas Haverkort, who would later lose his podium to Gabriel Bortoleto after a penalty for a technical fault. A sudden thunderstorm caused a three-car crash and a red flag, and Minì controlled the restart to claim the win. Beganovic's championship advantage rose to 38 points from Aron.

Round three supported the prestigious Monaco Grand Prix, and one qualifying session was held, where Hadrien David and Beganovic claimed pole for the two races. David held the lead in race one, and there were little changes to the order before the red flag was thrown when the track was blocked by Esteban Masson at the Fairmont Hairpin. When the race restarted, passing remained tricky, so Beganovic could do nothing but follow David to the finish to grab his fifth top-two finish in a row. Haverkort came third, having held back Minì all race long. Race two saw the top pair reversed, with Beganovic leading David, before two separate crashes for Roman Biliński and Macéo Capietto brought out the safety car. There were a few little fights with slight contact further down the field, but almost no passes were made, and the top trio of Beganovic, David and Minì held position until the finish. David's great weekend saw him grab second in the standings, but Beganovic's lead now stood at 55 points over the rest of the field.

A week later, Paul Ricard hosted the next round, and Beganovic started the first race on pole. He kept Bortoleto behind at the start, before Joshua Dufek crashed and caused a safety car. On the restart, Aron in third managed to pass Bortoleto. The Prema pair gapped the field fighting for the win, and eventually Aron was able to pass his teammate. On the last lap, Bortoleto in third had to relinquish his podium to Belov. Race two saw Minì on pole, surviving another first-lap safety car ahead of Beganovic, who had already passed Bortoleto. The lead group was close together all race, before another safety car neutralised the race, leaving a short dash to the finish. Beganovic pressured the leader, but was not able to make a move, so came second behind Minì and ahead of Haverkort. His run of now eight top-two finishes was brought to an end however, as his car was found to be non-compliant and he was excluded from race two. This initially gifted Aron a podium, but Beganovic's championship lead was still 45 points over Minì. Beganovic's team appealed the decision. After the team won its appeal in front of the Italian Federation's Court of Appeal in October, the Championship Promoter made a further appeal against the Italian Court's ruling, which was finally denied by the FIA International Court of Appeal. Beganovic was thus reinstated to second place.

The first half of the season concluded at Zandvoort with Aron winning the first qualifying. He held David back at the start and kept a consistent gap to the Frenchman, before coming under attack in the latter stages of the race. Keith Donegan had an incident in turn two that resulted in a late safety car, but David was not able to make a move on the leader during the restart. Behind the pair, Haverkort held back Minì to complete the podium. David later lost his podium when he was penalized for misuse of the push-to-pass system. Qualifying for race two again saw Aron come out on top. He was once again strong in the race, holding the lead from Beganovic as Minì jumped from fifth to third before a red flag was thrown when Pietro Delli Guanti's car flew over the barrier at Hugenholtzbocht. Through the rest of the race, Minì passed Beganovic for second, but Aron's lead was uncontested. He completed a perfect weekend, his two wins earned him second in the standings and cut Beganovic's lead down to 36 points.

=== Second half ===
Next, the series travelled to the Hungaroring, where Haverkort picked up his maiden pole position in first qualifying. He controlled the start, as Aron in second got overtaken by Minì, before he got pushed off by Dufek and fell down the order. Dufek was then passed himself by Roman Biliński and Leonardo Fornaroli. This order then settled down and remained the same until the end, earning Haverkort his maiden win in the series. Race two began with David on pole alongside Minì, with the Italian getting overtaken by Bortoleto around turn one, who then tried to pass David for the lead, but failed. This order remained until Joshua Dürksen crashed, bringing out a safety car and setting the field up for a late restart. This was where Minì quickly passed Bortoleto for second before the safety car was called again and the race ended behind it. Beganovic had a rare off-day, qualifying twelfth, then having a troubled race and finishing 16th. This coupled with two second places for Minì meant his lead was slashed to only nine points.

Spa-Francorchamps played host to round six of the championship, and Beganovic was back on form, taking pole for race one. He held off pressure from Minì in second at the start, and had no pressure from then on. Shortly before the end, Minì had a puncture that ended his race. He would have lost his second place, were it not for a timely red flag called two laps later, with the results declared from lap 12 and Minì in second. Third was Meguetounif, fighting with Aron all race. After the race, Minì was disqualified on technical grounds, promoting Eduardo Barrichello to his maiden podium. Race two saw Aron on pole, before getting passed by David, Bortoleto and Beganovic. David was first over the line, but the stewards judged his pass for the lead to be made under yellow flags, handing him a penalty and thereby giving Bortoleto the win. A win and a podium meant Beganovic could overturn his recent negative trend and grow his points margin to 23 ahead of Minì. The rookie standings were now led by Fornaroli.

After the summer break, racing returned at Spielberg with Aron on pole for race one. Heavy rain disrupted the race start and caused a stoppage. On the restart, many drivers, including the lead group, soon pitted for dry tires. This left Barrichello in the lead, before getting passed by returnee Pierre-Louis Chovet, while Haverkort had moved up from 12th on the grid to second. A safety car was then brought out when Aron and Montoya collided after pitting. While slick tires initially were faster than rain tires, returning rain meant the advantage of the dry tires was gone. On the restart Haverkort and Dufek went past Chovet to finish first and second. The second race also was not very straightforward, disrupted by three safety car periods. David was still able to keep his competition behind, leading from pole until the end and leaving Beganovic and Dufek to fight each other behind, the pair eventually finishing in that same order. Two podiums for Beganovic to none for Minì meant the Swede built up his points gap to 53.

The penultimate round of the season was held at Barcelona, and Aron was once again on pole for the first race. He held off Dilano van 't Hoff at the start, who had to defend from Barrichello and David. Over the race, David was able to dispatch third and second place and began closing in on Aron. Through the last three laps, Aron repeatedly came under attack from David, but was able to keep the frenchman behind and win the race. Qualifying for race two saw Bortoleto grab his maiden pole. David started third and was able to get by Chovet straight away, but his attempt to gain the race lead was interrupted by the safety car being called. On the restart, Bortoleto initially gapped David, but the latter managed to close the gap again, with the pair fighting for a few laps until another safety car was called late in the race and the race ended under yellow flag conditions. Beganovic had a mediocre weekend, with only one points finish, so his gap to Minì dropped to 38 points, leaving the championship to be decided at Mugello.

The championship decider at Mugello began with Aron on pole for race one and Beganovic needing at least fourth place to seal the title. Aron ran a flawless lights-to-flag race to get maximum points, but was not able to deny Beganovic his championship. The Swede started third and drove with his championship in mind, not attacking Victor Bernier in second all too aggressively. He held on to fourth after Dufek passed him on a late safety car restart, thereby clinching his first single-seater title. Bortoleto was on pole for the final race of the season. Minì started third and had to win with Aron not scoring to secure second in the championship. He dispatched Dufek right at the start and gained the lead after the first third of the race. From then on, he controlled the race, while Aron started 16th and came home pointless, ceding second in the standings to Minì by a single point. Dufek in fourth was on course to win the rookie title, before an error on a safety car restart saw him drop to seventh, giving Fornaroli in eighth the title.

Beganovic's consistency was the key for his championship, only failing to score points on three occasions, as well as his very strong start to the season that saw him finish in the top two for the first seven races in a row. Minì and Aron both had stretches where they seemed able to close up to Beganovic, but his early advantage meant he led the standings from the first race until the end. In the fight for the rookie title, Montoya had the strongest start, but a run of eight pointless races in the end saw him drop to third. Entry numbers never dropped below 35, showing continually high interest in the championship. The introduction of a push-to-pass system proved to better competition, although still held back somewhat by the heavy Tatuus chassis.

== Championship standings ==
Points system

Points were awarded to the top 10 classified finishers.

Position	**1st**	**2nd**	**3rd**	**4th**	**5th**	**6th**	**7th**	**8th**	**9th**	**10th**
Points	25	18	15	12	10	8	6	4	2	1

=== Drivers' standings ===
Pos.	Driver	MNZ (Italy)		IMO (Italy)		MCO (Monaco)		LEC (France)		ZAN (Netherlands)		HUN (Hungary)		SPA (Belgium)		RBR (Austria)		CAT (Spain)		MUG (Italy)		Points
Pos.	Driver	R1	R2	R1	R2	R1	R2	R1	R2	R1	R2	R1	R2	R1	R2	R1	R2	R1	R2	R1	R2	Points
1	(Sweden) Dino Beganovic	**1**	2	1	2	2	**1**	**2**	2	4	3	7	16	**1**	3	4	2	11	10	4	3	300
2	(Italy) Gabriele Minì	15	3	**28**	**1**	4	3	5	**1**	3	2	2	2	DSQ	6	7	4	5	7	Ret	1	242
3	(Estonia) Paul Aron	27	**1**	3	6	25	DNQ	1	4	**1**	**1**	6	7	4	**4**	**Ret**	16	**1**	4	**1**	11	238
4	(France) Hadrien David	4	7	10	4	**1**	2	6	5	12	7	8	**1**	18	2	13	**1**	2	2	8	4	222
5	(Netherlands) Kas Haverkort	5	4	5	DSQ	3	4	9	3	2	15	**1**	12	7	12	1	14	4	5	6	9	184
6	(Brazil) Gabriel Bortoleto	6	9	7	3	6	5	4	6	Ret	8	9	3	14	1	15	5	7	**1**	Ret	**2**	174
7	Michael Belov	2	5	15	5	5	6	3	7	7	6											91
8	(Italy) Leonardo Fornaroli	10	15	8	8	9	12	20	24	8	5	4	5	6	8	19	10	9	8	5	8	83
9	(Switzerland) Joshua Dufek	18	13	12	10	DNQ	22	Ret	26	23	10	5	6	10	21	2	3	8	Ret	3	7	79
10	(Spain) Mari Boya	7	6	2	21	7	7	7	8	5	12	12	14	13	10	10	Ret	25	29	17	12	67
11	(Brazil) Eduardo Barrichello	26	20	19	17	11	13	21	16	18	32	Ret	18	3	5	5	8	6	12	23	23	51
12	(Spain) Lorenzo Fluxá	3	23	11	11	DNQ	18	8	9	15	14	14	13	5	Ret	9	Ret	16	9	13	5	49
13	(Colombia) Sebastián Montoya	8	8	4	Ret	17	14	11	12	6	4	16	8	16	13	32	17	13	15	12	20	44
14	(Paraguay) Joshua Dürksen	19	14	6	12	12	10	13	13	Ret	18	15	Ret	21	14	6	6	10	6	9	13	40
15	(Germany) Tim Tramnitz	11	12	9	7	16	Ret	10	11	Ret	Ret	Ret	4	8	7	33†	9	22	13	11	14	35
16	(France) Sami Meguetounif	9	11	Ret	DNS	15	11	15	20	13	16	17	Ret	2	11	11	15	20	21	16	28	21
17	(France) Victor Bernier	14	17	NC	32†	DNQ	17	23	Ret	9	13	18	Ret	15	17	26	13	Ret	Ret	2	15	20
18	(Poland) Roman Biliński	13	18	14	14	18	Ret	16	10	11	11	3	Ret	11	19	17	Ret	21	14	21	25	16
19	(Netherlands) Dilano van 't Hoff	Ret	19	21	18	DNQ	20			WD	WD			27	24	20	Ret	3	Ret	20	10	16
20	(France) Owen Tangavelou	22	26	31†	16	DNQ	19	14	Ret	17	19	19	9	9	9	14	11	17	Ret	DNS	6	15
21	(Netherlands) Laurens van Hoepen	Ret	Ret	20	13	8	8	18	14	19	21	11	15	20	15	8	Ret	18	19	10	17	15
22	(France) Macéo Capietto	12	10	13	9	13	Ret	26	Ret	16	9	26	10	19	16	16	28	23	20	7	18	12
23	(Mexico) Noel León	21	25	22	15	10	9	17	21	24	17	13	17	22	Ret	12	12	12	17	24	27	3
24	(France) Esteban Masson	17	22	23	20	14	15	32	Ret	14	Ret	10	11	17	22	22	Ret	19	16	19	22	1
25	(Italy) Pietro Delli Guanti	Ret	24	16	Ret	19	16	12	15	10	Ret	21	29†	25	18							1
26	(Italy) Francesco Braschi	29	30	27	24	24	DNQ	24	18	26	23	23	23	23	23	18	27	26	11	Ret	Ret	1
27	(Mexico) Santiago Ramos	25	Ret	32	19	23	DNQ	22	17	22	22	20	27	12	Ret	24	22	33†	26	18	19	0
28	(Hungary) Levente Révész	23	27	17	22	22	DNQ	25	Ret	21	24	22	19	28	20	21	18	14	30	25	Ret	0
29	(Colombia) Nicolás Baptiste	16	29	Ret	26	DNQ	25	33	29	27	26	30	28	30	27	25	21	31	22	15	21	0
30	(Republic of Ireland) Keith Donegan	31†	16	25	25	20	DNQ	27	19	Ret	29											0
31	(Switzerland) Axel Gnos	Ret	WD	18	29	DNQ	24	28	25	25	30	29	22	WD	WD			29	28	26	32	0
32	(Peru) Matías Zagazeta	20	28	26	28	DNQ	21	19	23	20	20	25	21	24	25	31	26	24	18	30	29	0
33	(Italy) Pietro Armanni	32†	Ret	30	27	21	DNQ	31	22	28	31	24	25	31	Ret	30	19	32†	23	28	24	0
34	(Italy) Andrea Rosso											27	20									0
35	(Poland) Piotr Wiśnicki	24	21			DNQ	23	30	28	29	25	28	24	29	Ret	28	23	28	25	27	Ret	0
36	(Finland) Patrik Pasma			24	23																	0
37	(Italy) Nicola Marinangeli													Ret	26	23	25	30	27	29	31	0
38	(United Arab Emirates) Hamda Al Qubaisi	30	Ret	Ret	31	27	DNQ	29	27	30	27	31	26	26	Ret	29	24					0
39	(Switzerland) Léna Bühler	Ret	Ret	WD	WD	26	DNQ															0
40	(China) Cenyu Han	28	31	29	30	28	DNQ	Ret	30	31	28											0
Guest drivers ineligible to score points
—	(France) Pierre-Louis Chovet															3	7	15	3	14	16	–
—	(France) Gillian Henrion															Ret	20					–
—	(Finland) William Alatalo																			22	26	–
—	(Denmark) Sebastian Øgaard															27	29	27	24	31†	30	–
—	(United Arab Emirates) Amna Al Qubaisi																	Ret	31	Ret	Ret	–
—	(Czech Republic) Tereza Bábíčková															Ret	WD					–
Pos.	Driver	R1	R2	R1	R2	R1	R2	R1	R2	R1	R2	R1	R2	R1	R2	R1	R2	R1	R2	R1	R2	Points
Pos.	Driver	MNZ (Italy)		IMO (Italy)		MCO (Monaco)		LEC (France)		ZAN (Netherlands)		HUN (Hungary)		SPA (Belgium)		RBR (Austria)		CAT (Spain)		MUG (Italy)		Points

Colour	Result
Gold	Winner
Silver	Second place
Bronze	Third place
Green	Points classification
Blue	Non-points classification
Blue	Non-classified finish (NC)
Purple	Retired, not classified (Ret)
Red	Did not qualify (DNQ)
Red	Did not pre-qualify (DNPQ)
Black	Disqualified (DSQ)
White	Did not start (DNS)
White	Withdrew (WD)
White	Race cancelled (C)
Blank	Did not practice (DNP)
Blank	Did not arrive (DNA)
Blank	Excluded (EX)

**Bold** – Pole

Italics – Fastest Lap

† — Did not finish, but classified

Rookie

=== Teams' standings ===
For teams entering more than two cars only the two best-finishing cars were eligible to score points in the teams' championship.

Pos.	Team	MNZ (Italy)		IMO (Italy)		MCO (Monaco)		LEC (France)		ZAN (Netherlands)		HUN (Hungary)		SPA (Belgium)		RBR (Austria)		CAT (Spain)		MUG (Italy)		Points
Pos.	Team	R1	R2	R1	R2	R1	R2	R1	R2	R1	R2	R1	R2	R1	R2	R1	R2	R1	R2	R1	R2	Points
1	(Italy) Prema Racing	**1**	**1**	1	2	2	**1**	1	3	**1**	**1**	6	7	**1**	3	4	2	**1**	4	**1**	3	531
1	(Italy) Prema Racing	8	2	3	6	17	14	**2**	11	4	3	7	8	4	**4**	29	16	11	10	4	11	531
2	(France) R-ace GP	3	7	7	3	**1**	2	4	4	12	7	8	**1**	5	1	9	**1**	2	**1**	8	**2**	421
2	(France) R-ace GP	4	9	10	4	6	5	6	5	15	8	9	3	15	2	13	5	7	2	13	4	421
3	(France) ART Grand Prix	7	3	2	**1**	4	3	5	**1**	3	2	2	2	17	6	7	4	5	7	10	1	315
3	(France) ART Grand Prix	15	6	20	14	7	7	7	7	5	12	11	14	20	15	8	Ret	18	16	19	17	315
4	(Netherlands) Van Amersfoort Racing	5	4	5	10	3	4	9	2	2	10	**1**	6	8	12	1	3	4	5	3	7	266
4	(Netherlands) Van Amersfoort Racing	18	13	12	22	22	22	25	25	21	15	5	12	11	20	2	14	8	30	6	9	266
5	(Italy) Trident	10	12	8	7	9	12	10	9	8	5	3	4	7	7	17	9	9	8	5	8	136
5	(Italy) Trident	11	15	9	8	16	Ret	16	10	11	11	4	5	9	8	19	10	21	13	11	14	136
6	(Netherlands) MP Motorsport	2	5	15	5	5	6	3	6	7	6	17	23	3	10	10	15	3	21	16	10	133
6	(Netherlands) MP Motorsport	9	11	21	18	15	11	15	19	13	16	23	Ret	14	11	11	Ret	20	29	17	12	133
7	(United Kingdom) Arden Motorsport	19	14	6	12	10	9	13	12	18	17	13	17	4	5	5	6	6	6	9	13	94
7	(United Kingdom) Arden Motorsport	21	20	19	15	11	10	17	15	24	18	15	18	22	14	6	8	10	12	23	23	94
8	(Spain) FA Racing by MP	14	17	23	20	14	15	23	28	9	13	10	11	20	17	18	13	26	11	2	15	22
8	(Spain) FA Racing by MP	16	22	NC	26	DNQ	17	32	Ret	14	28	18	28	24	23	25	21	31	22	15	21	22
9	(Italy) RPM	31†	16	16	25	19	16	12	14	10	25	19	9	9	9	3	7	15	3	14	6	16
9	(Italy) RPM	Ret	24	25	Ret	20	DNQ	27	18	Ret	Ret	21	20	26	18	14	11	17	Ret	18	16	16
10	(Italy) Monolite Racing	12	10	13	9	13	Ret	26	21	16	9	24	10	18	16	16	19	23	20	7	18	12
10	(Italy) Monolite Racing	28	31	29	27	21	DNQ	31	29	28	30	26	25	32	26	23	25	30	23	28	24	12
11	(Finland) KIC Motorsport	24	21	24	19	23	23	22	16	22	23	20	24	13	Ret	24	22	27	24	22	26	0
11	(Finland) KIC Motorsport	25	30	27	23	24	DNQ	24	17	26	24	28	27	30	Ret	27	23	28	25	27	30	0
12	(Switzerland) G4 Racing	20	26	18	16	DNQ	19	14	22	17	19	25	21	25	25	31	20	24	18	26	29	0
12	(Switzerland) G4 Racing	22	28	26	28	DNQ	21	19	24	20	21	29	22	WD	WD	Ret	26	29	28	30	32	0
Pos.	Team	R1	R2	R1	R2	R1	R2	R1	R2	R1	R2	R1	R2	R1	R2	R1	R2	R1	R2	R1	R2	Points
Pos.	Team	MNZ (Italy)		IMO (Italy)		MCO (Monaco)		LEC (France)		ZAN (Netherlands)		HUN (Hungary)		SPA (Belgium)		RBR (Austria)		CAT (Spain)		MUG (Italy)		Points
