= Anichkovs =

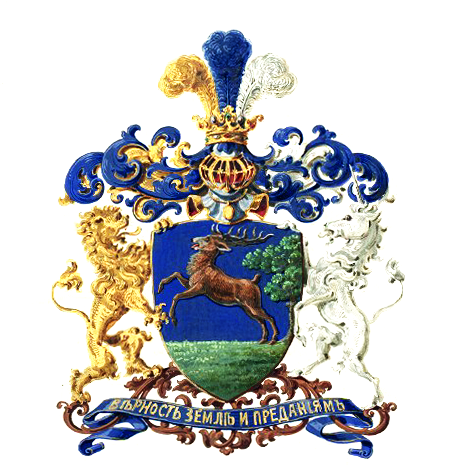
Coat of arms of the Anichkov family

The Anichkov family or (Onichkov) is an ancient Russian noble family.

== History ==
The Anichkov family is an ancient Russian noble family, first documented when Ivan Alexandrovich and Alexander Nikiforovich submitted documents for entry into the Velvet Book on September 20, 1687, and March 19, 1686, respectively. Stepan Alexandrovich is recorded to have sent a discharge order petitioning the Trinity-Sergius Monastery to obtain extracts from the chronicler regarding the origins of the Anichkovs, which were granted on May 31, 1688.

In one pedigree of a painting submitted by the Anichkovs, the family is shown to be connected to the Blokhin and Ufimtsevs families.

The Anichkovs have also been closely associated with the city of St. Petersburg over the past three centuries, lending their name to numerous urban infrastructure features.

== Origin ==
The lineage has been recorded since the 16th century. According to the latter genealogy, a member of the family of the Tatar Berke Khan, ruler of the Golden Horde, became a great friend of Ivan I Kalita - later the Grand Duke of Moscow (1325) - and entered his service in 1301. Berke's relative was baptised, taking the name Berkey Onikii, and married the daughter of Vikula of the noble house of Vorontsov. From this adopted name, his descendants began to be called Onichkov, or Anichkov. The baptism was performed by Peter, the Metropolitan of Kyiv, who blessed the new Christian with a gold Panagia, decorated with expensive stones and containing relics, and a silver ladle with the inscription: " ... the humble Metropolitan Peter of Kiev and all Rus' bless at his holy baptism Prince Berkey and his sons with the name of Aniky." The Grand Duchess, Elena, wife of Ivan Kalita, was Godmother to Berkey and presented him, among other gifts, with a precious gold cross, while the Grand Duke granted him a living stipend. These gifts were kept in the Anichkov family as relics.

The landowners of Derevskaya Pyatina were: Gregory, Vasily, Andrey, Gleb, and Ivan Ivanovich Anichkovs (1495). Derevskaya pyatina is one of the pyatina in Novgorod Land until the 18th century. Mikhail and Polievkt Grigorievich were killed near Orsha (1514). Fyodor Denisievich voivode of troops in the campaign of the Grand Duke Vasily III to Kazan (1530). Boyar Ivan Grigorievich was guarantor for the boyars (1563), siege head in Salekh (1578-1579), and Kholm (1682-1584). Novgorod boyar sons: Bogdan and Semyon Ivanovich Anichkovs were granted estates (2 October 1552). In the Battle of Molodi Aleksey Dmitrievich from Serpeisk died (July 1572).

The tsar's charter mentions († 1603) Malice Onichkov, whose lands received from his grandfather (1597) were transferred to Ivan Mikhailovich Onichkov.

Branches of the Anichkov family were beneficiaries of mestnichestvo, a system which gave nobles prestigious positions at the royal court, or other government posts, according to set rules of precedence for the aristocratic houses and an individual's seniority. At times disputes would arise regarding the proper place of a noble clan within the hierarchy. One petitioner in such a case, the holder of a high position as a Stryapchy (Russian: Солиситор), "with a key" (a role akin to a chamberlain, with authority over the Tsar's household treasury and close access to the Tsar) was I. M. Anichkov, a member of the Ufa Anichkovs. In 1643, to prevent a reduction in status in this branch's place in the mestnichestvo, the stryapchy's petition stated that "losses" had resulted through distant relatives who were exiled to Ufa during the reign of Ivan the Terrible. According to him, they were "extremely ossified" in Ufa, subsisting "in extreme poverty" and "must obey the Voivodes (governors) who are worse than those of their homeland". The request was heard, and in the decree was written: "Ufimtsov Onichkovs are not ordered to undergo any loss in position."

In the 16th and 17th centuries, among the Anichkovs there were many stewards, and Duma nobles, some of whom became governors of large cities, such as Kursk, Yaroslavl, Ufa, and Cheboksary. In the 17th century, Voivode O. G. Anichkov founded the city of Kuznetsk (now Novokuznetsk), and F. M. Anichkov served as the Russian ambassador to Sweden.

== Description of emblems ==
The Armorial of Anisim Titovich Knyazev of 1785 features two images of seals displaying the coat of arms representative of the Anichkov family:

1. The first depicts a court councillor - the trustee of the Imperial Orphanage in 1786, Stepan Silich Anichkov, with a shield of round shape and a gold border in a circle, in a silver field. The shield features a white deer with red (or golden) antlers galloping to the right on green grass from the forest. The shield is topped with a noble helmet and a crown held over the helmet by a lion and unicorn, resting their hind legs on the bend.
2. The second coat of arms, belonging to a homogenous of the Anichkov family, is displayed in an oval shield with a blue field, with a silver deer galloping to the right on green grass. The shield is decorated with a noble crown (without the presence of a helmet). A lion to the left and a unicorn to the right are depicted as the Shield holders. The family name is missing.

== See also ==
- Anichkov, list of notable persons with the surname

== Literature ==
- Аничковы // Энциклопедический словарь Брокгауза и Ефрона : в 86 т. (82 т. и 4 доп.). — Санкт-Петербург, 1890–1907.
- Долгоруков П. В. Российская родословная книга. — Санкт-Петербург: Типография 3 Отд. Собств. Е. И. В. Канцелярии, 1857. — Т. 4. — С. 241.
- Руммель В. В., Голубцов В. В. Родословный сборник русских дворянских фамилий. — Т. 1. — С. 35—56.
- Anichkov N.M. The Anichkovs. - Three centuries of St. Petersburg. Encyclopedia in 3 vols. T. 2. Book 1 (A-B). - Publishing house Filologich. Faculty of St. Petersburg State University, 2003;
- Anichkov S.V. At the turn of two eras. - Lenningrad: Lenizdat, 1981;
- Petrov P.N. History of St. Petersburg. - St. Petersburg: Edition of Glazunov, 1885. P. 614.
- Professors of the Military Medical (Medico-Surgical) Academy / Ed. prof. A. B. Belevitina. - St. Petersburg: Publishing house of VMedA. 2008 .-- S. 175, 329, 481.
- Russian Biographical Encyclopedia "Great Russia". T. 1 / Ed. prof. A. I. Melua. - St. Petersburg: Publishing house "Humanistics", 2009. - P. 395–399.
- N.N. Anichkov / Sarkisov D.S. et al. - M .: Medicine, 1989;
- Shilov D.N., Kuzmin Yu. A. Members of the State Council of the Russian Empire. 1801–1906. - St. Petersburg: Publishing house "Dmitry Bulavin", 2007. - P. 34–36.
- Jubilee article "N. M. Anichkov" // Niva. - 1894. - No. 3. - P. 73;
