= Strannik (disambiguation) =

Strannik (Russian for "wanderer") may refer to:

- Russian wandering, Russian spiritual way of wandering life
- Ivan Strannik, pen name of Anna Anichkova
- Count Egor Strannik, character from 1916 American silent film The Sowers
- Strannik space tugs by Success Rockets, private Russian space company
- Strannik (Russian Literary Award)
