= Anichkov =

Anichkov, feminine: Anichkova is a Russian surname belonging to a Russian noble family of Anichkovs. Notable people with the surname include:

- Anna Anichkova (1868/1869–1935), Russian writer and translator who published under the pseudonym Ivan Strannik
- Evgeny Anichkov (1866–1937), Russian literary critic and historian
- Nikolay Anichkov (1885–1964), Russian pathologist
