= Blokhin =

Blokhin (masculine, Russian: Блохин) or Blokhina (feminine, Russian: Блохина) is a Russian surname. Notable people with the surname include:

- Alexander Blokhin (born 1951), Russian diplomat
- Alexis Blokhina (born 2004), American tennis player
- Evgeni Blokhin (born 1979), Kazakh ice hockey player
- Iryna Blokhina (born 1983), Ukrainian singer and poet
- Nikolai Blokhin (1912 - 1993), Soviet surgeon and oncologist
- Oleg Blokhin (born 1952), Soviet and Ukrainian football coach
- Oleh Olehovych Blokhin (born 1980), Ukrainian football player
- Sofia Blokhin (born 2006), Estonian chess player
- Tatyana Blokhina (born 1970), Russian heptathlete
- Vasily Blokhin (1895–1955), Soviet military officer and executioner
- Victoria Blokhina, Russian racing driver

== See also ==
- Blokhin Peak, Chukotka, Russia
