= 2022 Italian F4 Championship =

Motorsport season

The 2022 Italian F4 Championship Powered by Abarth was the ninth season of the Italian F4 Championship. The series moved onto new generation of the Formula 4 cars, continuing its collaboration with Tatuus and Abarth.

== Teams and drivers ==
Team	No.	Driver	Class	Rounds
(Netherlands) Van Amersfoort Racing	2	(United States) Arias Deukmedjian	R	1–4
(Netherlands) Van Amersfoort Racing	17	(Brazil) Emerson Fittipaldi Jr.	R	All
(Netherlands) Van Amersfoort Racing	31	(United Kingdom) Arvid Lindblad	R	5–7
(Netherlands) Van Amersfoort Racing	33	(Italy) Brando Badoer	R	All
(Netherlands) Van Amersfoort Racing	34	(Norway) Martinius Stenshorne	R	All
(Netherlands) Van Amersfoort Racing	96	(Belgium) Jules Castro	R	All
(Italy) Prema Racing	3	(United States) Ugo Ugochukwu	R	5, 7
(Italy) Prema Racing	7	(Austria) Charlie Wurz	R	All
(Italy) Prema Racing	12	(Italy) Andrea Kimi Antonelli	R	All
(Italy) Prema Racing	13	(Australia) James Wharton	R	All
(Italy) Prema Racing	20	(Denmark) Conrad Laursen		All
(Italy) Prema Racing	88	(Brazil) Rafael Câmara	R	All
(France) R-ace GP	8	(Italy) Giovanni Maschio	R	7
(France) R-ace GP	14	(Denmark) Frederik Lund	R	All
(France) R-ace GP	71	(Australia) Marcos Flack		1–3
(France) R-ace GP	72	(Republic of Ireland) Adam Fitzgerald	R	4–5
(France) R-ace GP	73	(France) Raphaël Narac		6
(France) R-ace GP	74	(France) Hadrien David		6
(Slovenia) AS Motorsport	8	(Italy) Giovanni Maschio	R	4–6
(Slovenia) AS Motorsport	61	(Italy) Giovanni Maschio	R	1–2
(Slovenia) AS Motorsport	62	(Italy) Manuel Quondamcarlo	R	2, 4
(Italy) BVM Racing	9	(Italy) Alfio Spina	R	5–7
(Italy) BVM Racing	18	(South Korea) Kim Hwarang (Note: Kim is a South Korean driver who competed under a Portuguese licence in round 2 and a South Korean licence in rounds 3–6.)	R	2–6
(Italy) BVM Racing	19	(Sweden) William Karlsson	R	2–7
(Germany) BWR Motorsports	9	(Italy) Alfio Spina	R	1–4
(Germany) BWR Motorsports	29	(Singapore) Rishab Jain	R	1–6
(Germany) US Racing	11	(Mozambique) Pedro Perino (Note: Perino is a Mozambican-Portuguese driver who competed under a Portuguese licence in rounds 1–2 and a Mozambican licence in rounds 3–7.)		All
(Germany) US Racing	22	(Republic of Ireland) Alex Dunne		All
(Germany) US Racing	30	(Malta) Zachary David (Note: David is a Filipino driver competing under a Maltese licence.)	R	5–6
(Germany) US Racing	37	(Poland) Kacper Sztuka		All
(Germany) US Racing	44	(United States) Nikhil Bohra (Note: Bohra is an American-Indian driver who competed under a Singaporean licence in round 1 and an American licence in rounds 2–7.)	R	All
(Germany) US Racing	52	(France) Marcus Amand		All
(Germany) US Racing	69	(United States) Akshay Bohra	R	7
(Germany) PHM Racing	15	(Italy) Nikita Bedrin (Note: Bedrin and Blokhina are Russian, but they compete under an Italian licence as Russian national emblems were banned by the FIA following the Russian invasion of Ukraine. Blokhina entered round 1 under a neutral flag.)		All
(Germany) PHM Racing	41	(Germany) Jonas Ried		All
(Germany) PHM Racing	77	(United Kingdom) Taylor Barnard		All
(Germany) PHM Racing	78	(Italy) Victoria Blokhina	R W	All
(Italy) Cars Racing	21	(Italy) Andrea Frassineti	R	All
(Switzerland) Jenzer Motorsport	23	(Ukraine) Oleksandr Partyshev		All
(Switzerland) Jenzer Motorsport	26	(Thailand) Nandhavud Bhirombhakdi	R	3, 6–7
(Switzerland) Jenzer Motorsport	27	(Switzerland) Ethan Ischer	R	All
(Switzerland) Jenzer Motorsport	28	(Germany) Valentin Kluss	R	2–7
(San Marino) AKM Motorsport	35	(Brazil) Pedro Clerot	R	1–2
(San Marino) AKM Motorsport	36	(Uzbekistan) Ismoilkhuja Akhmedkhodjaev	R	All
(San Marino) AKM Motorsport	38	(Italy) Valerio Rinicella	R	3–7
(San Marino) AKM Motorsport	39	(China) Ruiqi Liu	R	6–7
(Italy) / Iron Lynx (Note: Car No. 47 and No. 89 entered as Iron Lynx, car No. 83 entered as Iron Dames.); (Italy) / Iron Dames	47	(Italy) Nicola Lacorte	R	5–7
(Italy) / Iron Lynx; (Italy) / Iron Dames	83	(Spain) Maya Weug (Note: Weug is a Dutch-Belgian-Spanish driver competing under a Spanish licence.)	W	All
(Italy) / Iron Lynx; (Italy) / Iron Dames	89	(Portugal) Ivan Domingues	R	All
(Switzerland) Maffi Racing	48	(Switzerland) Elia Sperandio	R	All
(Switzerland) Maffi Racing	54	(Argentina) Juan Francisco Soldavini	R	5–6
(Italy) Cram Motorsport	79	(Greece) Georgis Markogiannis		3–7
(Italy) Cram Motorsport	80	(Mexico) Ricardo Escotto	R	1, 3
(Italy) Cram Motorsport	81	(Brazil) Nicholas Monteiro	R	3–4
(Italy) Cram Motorsport	82	(Brazil) Nelson Neto	R	4
(Spain) Monlau Motorsport	97	(Belgium) Niels Koolen	R	6–7
(Spain) Monlau Motorsport	98	(Belgium) Jef Machiels	R	6–7
(Spain) Monlau Motorsport	99	(Mexico) Jesse Carrasquedo Jr.		7

Icon	Legend
R	Rookie
W	Woman Trophy

== Race calendar and results ==
The calendar was revealed on 8 October 2021. The four race format was used when the number of the entrants exceeded the circuit's capacity.

Round		Circuit	Date	Pole position	Fastest lap	Winning driver	Winning team	Secondary class winner	Supporting
1	R1	(Italy) Imola Circuit	7 May	(Italy) Andrea Kimi Antonelli	(Italy) Andrea Kimi Antonelli	(Brazil) Rafael Câmara	(Italy) Prema Racing	R: (Brazil) Rafael Câmara; W: (Spain) Maya Weug	Formula Regional European Championship; TCR Italy Touring Car Championship; Porsche Carrera Cup Italy; Clio Cup Europe
1	R2	(Italy) Imola Circuit	8 May	(Denmark) Frederik Lund (Note: Alex Dunne set the fastest time in qualifying, but received a five-place grid penalty for failing to slow down for a yellow flag. Frederik Lund was promoted to pole position in his place.)	(Italy) Andrea Kimi Antonelli	(Republic of Ireland) Alex Dunne	(Germany) US Racing	R: (Australia) James Wharton; W: (Spain) Maya Weug	Formula Regional European Championship; TCR Italy Touring Car Championship; Porsche Carrera Cup Italy; Clio Cup Europe
1	R3	(Italy) Imola Circuit	8 May	(Portugal) Ivan Domingues	(Brazil) Rafael Câmara	(Poland) Kacper Sztuka	(Germany) US Racing	R: (Brazil) Rafael Câmara; W: (Spain) Maya Weug	Formula Regional European Championship; TCR Italy Touring Car Championship; Porsche Carrera Cup Italy; Clio Cup Europe
2	R1	(Italy) Misano World Circuit	4 June	(Italy) Andrea Kimi Antonelli	(Italy) Andrea Kimi Antonelli	(Italy) Andrea Kimi Antonelli	(Italy) Prema Racing	R: (Italy) Andrea Kimi Antonelli; W: (Spain) Maya Weug	Italian GT Championship; TCR Italy Touring Car Championship; Italian Prototype Championship; Porsche Carrera Cup Italy
2	R2	(Italy) Misano World Circuit	5 June	(Italy) Andrea Kimi Antonelli	(Italy) Andrea Kimi Antonelli	(Italy) Andrea Kimi Antonelli	(Italy) Prema Racing	R: (Italy) Andrea Kimi Antonelli; W: (Spain) Maya Weug	Italian GT Championship; TCR Italy Touring Car Championship; Italian Prototype Championship; Porsche Carrera Cup Italy
2	R3	(Italy) Misano World Circuit	5 June	(Italy) Andrea Kimi Antonelli	(Italy) Andrea Kimi Antonelli	(Brazil) Rafael Câmara	(Italy) Prema Racing	R: (Brazil) Rafael Câmara; W: (Spain) Maya Weug	Italian GT Championship; TCR Italy Touring Car Championship; Italian Prototype Championship; Porsche Carrera Cup Italy
3	R1	(Belgium) Circuit de Spa-Francorchamps	18 June	(Italy) Andrea Kimi Antonelli	(Italy) Andrea Kimi Antonelli	(Italy) Andrea Kimi Antonelli	(Italy) Prema Racing	R: (Italy) Andrea Kimi Antonelli; W: (Spain) Maya Weug	International GT Open; Euroformula Open; GT Cup Open Europe; TCR Europe Touring Car Series
3	R2	(Belgium) Circuit de Spa-Francorchamps	19 June	(Italy) Andrea Kimi Antonelli	(Republic of Ireland) Alex Dunne	(Italy) Andrea Kimi Antonelli	(Italy) Prema Racing	R: (Italy) Andrea Kimi Antonelli; W: (Spain) Maya Weug	International GT Open; Euroformula Open; GT Cup Open Europe; TCR Europe Touring Car Series
3	R3	(Belgium) Circuit de Spa-Francorchamps	19 June	(Brazil) Rafael Câmara	(Brazil) Rafael Câmara	(Italy) Andrea Kimi Antonelli	(Italy) Prema Racing	R: (Italy) Andrea Kimi Antonelli; W: (Spain) Maya Weug	International GT Open; Euroformula Open; GT Cup Open Europe; TCR Europe Touring Car Series
4	R1	(Italy) Vallelunga Circuit	2 July	(Italy) Andrea Kimi Antonelli	(Italy) Andrea Kimi Antonelli	(Italy) Andrea Kimi Antonelli	(Italy) Prema Racing	R: (Italy) Andrea Kimi Antonelli; W: (Spain) Maya Weug	Italian Prototype Championship
4	R2	(Italy) Vallelunga Circuit	3 July	(Italy) Andrea Kimi Antonelli	(Italy) Andrea Kimi Antonelli	(Italy) Andrea Kimi Antonelli	(Italy) Prema Racing	R: (Italy) Andrea Kimi Antonelli; W: (Spain) Maya Weug	Italian Prototype Championship
4	R3	(Italy) Vallelunga Circuit	3 July	(Italy) Andrea Kimi Antonelli	(Italy) Andrea Kimi Antonelli	(Italy) Andrea Kimi Antonelli	(Italy) Prema Racing	R: (Italy) Andrea Kimi Antonelli; W: (Spain) Maya Weug	Italian Prototype Championship
5	R1	(Austria) Red Bull Ring (Note: Due to too high a number of participants, the Red Bull Ring round was held in a different format—there were 4 races, with each driver competing in two of the first three races and the 36 best qualifying for race 4.)	10 September	(Brazil) Rafael Câmara	(Brazil) Rafael Câmara	(Republic of Ireland) Alex Dunne	(Germany) US Racing	R: (Australia) James Wharton; W: (Italy) Victoria Blokhina	Formula Regional European Championship; International GT Open; Euroformula Open; Clio Cup Europe
5	R2	(Austria) Red Bull Ring	10 September	(Italy) Andrea Kimi Antonelli	(Republic of Ireland) Alex Dunne	(Italy) Andrea Kimi Antonelli	(Italy) Prema Racing	R: (Italy) Andrea Kimi Antonelli; W: (Spain) Maya Weug	Formula Regional European Championship; International GT Open; Euroformula Open; Clio Cup Europe
5	R3	(Austria) Red Bull Ring	11 September	(Italy) Andrea Kimi Antonelli	(Italy) Andrea Kimi Antonelli	(Poland) Kacper Sztuka	(Germany) US Racing	R: (United States) Ugo Ugochukwu; W: (Spain) Maya Weug	Formula Regional European Championship; International GT Open; Euroformula Open; Clio Cup Europe
5	R4	(Austria) Red Bull Ring	11 September	(Republic of Ireland) Alex Dunne	(Italy) Andrea Kimi Antonelli	(Republic of Ireland) Alex Dunne	(Germany) US Racing	R: (Italy) Andrea Kimi Antonelli; W: (Spain) Maya Weug	Formula Regional European Championship; International GT Open; Euroformula Open; Clio Cup Europe
6	R1	(Italy) Autodromo Nazionale di Monza	8 October	(Austria) Charlie Wurz	(Denmark) Conrad Laursen	(Austria) Charlie Wurz	(Italy) Prema Racing	R: (Austria) Charlie Wurz; W: (Italy) Victoria Blokhina	Italian GT Championship; Italian Prototype Championship; Porsche Carrera Cup Italy; Clio Cup Europe
6	R2	(Italy) Autodromo Nazionale di Monza	9 October	(Italy) Andrea Kimi Antonelli	(Republic of Ireland) Alex Dunne	(Italy) Andrea Kimi Antonelli	(Italy) Prema Racing	R: (Italy) Andrea Kimi Antonelli; W: (Italy) Victoria Blokhina	Italian GT Championship; Italian Prototype Championship; Porsche Carrera Cup Italy; Clio Cup Europe
6	R3	(Italy) Autodromo Nazionale di Monza	9 October	(Brazil) Rafael Câmara	Cancelled due to adverse weather conditions				Italian GT Championship; Italian Prototype Championship; Porsche Carrera Cup Italy; Clio Cup Europe
7	R1	(Italy) Mugello Circuit	22 October	(Italy) Andrea Kimi Antonelli	(Italy) Andrea Kimi Antonelli	(Italy) Andrea Kimi Antonelli	(Italy) Prema Racing	R: (Italy) Andrea Kimi Antonelli; W: (Spain) Maya Weug	Formula Regional European Championship; Italian GT Championship
7	R2	(Italy) Mugello Circuit	23 October	(Italy) Andrea Kimi Antonelli	(Italy) Andrea Kimi Antonelli	(Italy) Andrea Kimi Antonelli	(Italy) Prema Racing	R: (Italy) Andrea Kimi Antonelli; W: (Spain) Maya Weug	Formula Regional European Championship; Italian GT Championship
7	R3	(Italy) Mugello Circuit	23 October	(Brazil) Rafael Câmara	(Italy) Andrea Kimi Antonelli	(Italy) Andrea Kimi Antonelli	(Italy) Prema Racing	R: (Italy) Andrea Kimi Antonelli; W: (Spain) Maya Weug	Formula Regional European Championship; Italian GT Championship

== Championship standings ==
Points were awarded to the top 10 classified finishers in each race. No points were awarded for pole position or fastest lap. The final classifications for the individual standings were obtained by summing up the scores on the 16 best results obtained during the races held.

Position	**1st**	**2nd**	**3rd**	**4th**	**5th**	**6th**	**7th**	**8th**	**9th**	**10th**
Points	25	18	15	12	10	8	6	4	2	1

=== Drivers' championship ===
Pos	Driver	IMO (Italy)			MIS (Italy)			SPA (Belgium)			VLL (Italy)			RBR (Austria)				MNZ (Italy)			MUG (Italy)			Pts
Pos	Driver	R1	R2	R3	R1	R2	R3	R1	R2	R3	R1	R2	R3	R1	R2	R3	R4	R1	R2	R3	R1	R2	R3	Pts
1	(Italy) Andrea Kimi Antonelli	**25**†	24	10	**1**	**1**	**2**	**1**	**1**	1	**1**	**1**	**1**		**1**	**23**	2	11	**1**	C	**1**	**1**	1	362
2	(Republic of Ireland) Alex Dunne	2	1	3	3	33†	7	10	2	5	4	4	Ret	1	3		**1**	2	6	C	2	2	Ret	258
3	(Brazil) Rafael Câmara	1	8	2	2	4	1	2	4	**3**	2	Ret	2	**17**	2		13	4	10	**C**	5	3	**Ret**	239
4	(Austria) Charlie Wurz	7	16	7	4	2	27†	4	7	4	9	3	3		5	6	14	**1**	2	C	4	6	3	198
5	(Australia) James Wharton	4	3	9	5	3	29†	3	5	Ret	3	7	4	2	6		4	30†	15	C	Ret	7	5	166
6	(Poland) Kacper Sztuka	Ret	2	1	Ret	10	4	Ret	12	6	7	5	6		4	1	5	3	Ret	C	Ret	4	Ret	162
7	(Norway) Martinius Stenshorne	5	5	5	Ret	7	6	Ret	11	8	10	10	9	6		4	8	29†	3	C	3	8	4	122
8	(United Kingdom) Taylor Barnard	6	10	4	Ret	12	9	7	31†	9	5	2	5	22		13	9	5	4	C	9	14	6	103
9	(France) Marcus Amand	8	4	8	8	5	3	5	9	7	6	6	Ret	Ret		9	10	12	8	C	8	36†	11	94
10	(United States) Ugo Ugochukwu													3		2	3				6	5	2	84
11	(Denmark) Conrad Laursen	Ret	29	13	6	6	5	8	Ret	2	8	8	11		9	3	6	32†	24	C	Ret	22	Ret	81
12	(Italy) Nikita Bedrin	3	9	6	9	9	28†	6	3	17	11	9	19	7		5	7	31†	11	C	12	15	10	77
13	(United States) Nikhil Bohra	13	15	Ret	11	16	21	9	6	10	15	Ret	7	4		7	12	34†	26	C	7	11	7	47
14	(Spain) Maya Weug	10	6	28†	7	11	8	13	10	15	13	11	8		7	8	11	37†	28	C	14	9	15	36
15	(Portugal) Ivan Domingues	9	7	**27**†	22	8	11	12	8	12	12	12	10	Ret	8		20	36†	WD	C	18	16	Ret	21
16	(Italy) Brando Badoer	Ret	32†	20	13	13	14	11	20	11	21	Ret	13	5	10		21	Ret	13	C	10	13	9	14
17	(United Kingdom) Arvid Lindblad													15	15		22	7	9	C	21	Ret	8	12
18	(France) Hadrien David																	Ret	5	C				10
19	(Mozambique) Pedro Perino	Ret	18	12	Ret	21	19	17	21	16	14	13	33†	13	25†		27	6	16	C	Ret	27	18	8
20	(Malta) Zachary David														Ret	12	17	33†	7	C				6
21	(Germany) Valentin Kluss				15	20	23	20	15	19	16	14	15	14		11	16	8	20	C	16	19	12	4
22	(Republic of Ireland) Adam Fitzgerald										25	30	Ret	8	22		Ret							4
23	(Brazil) Emerson Fittipaldi Jr.	11	19	17	10	15	12	15	14	13	19	19	23		17	14	18	9	14	C	11	10	16	4
24	(Belgium) Jules Castro	16	31	23	16	29	34†	21	22	24	20	32†	29	9	13		19	27	17	C	20	23	Ret	2
25	(Germany) Jonas Ried	14	14	16	Ret	32	Ret	14	Ret	33	Ret	18	12	11	21		Ret	10	37†	C	Ret	20	21	1
26	(Sweden) William Karlsson				Ret	24	16	23	24	18	22	15	16		24†	10	15	13	23	C	22	29	19	1
27	(United States) Arias Deukmedjian	26†	33†	15	Ret	17	10	18	26	Ret	WD	WD	WD											1
28	(Italy) Nicola Lacorte													10	Ret		26	Ret	35†	C	19	12	Ret	1
29	(Denmark) Frederik Lund	27†	**13**	11	Ret	22	31	Ret	13	Ret	29	27	18		16	21	30	18	38†	C	31†	25	27	0
30	(South Korea) Kim Hwarang				19	Ret	33†	Ret	30	27	26	29	28		11	16	Ret	14	31	C				0
31	(Brazil) Pedro Clerot	18	11	25	14	19	17																	0
32	(Italy) Alfio Spina	12	12	18	12	18	13	DNS	32†	14	18	21	Ret	Ret		Ret	DNQ	26	22	C	Ret	18	14	0
33	(Italy) Valerio Rinicella							16	Ret	23	17	16	14	Ret		17	33	38†	12	C	15	17	23	0
34	(Italy) Victoria Blokhina	17	30†	31	17	23	30	27	25	25	24	17	17	12		15	29	24	21	C	30†	28	25	0
35	(Switzerland) Elia Sperandio	23	17	19	18	27	32	25	19	28	35†	Ret	20	16	12		24	20	18	C	24	26	31	0
36	(United States) Akshay Bohra																				13	Ret	13	0
37	(Ukraine) Oleksandr Partyshev	24†	25	14	DNS	DNS	DNS	22	16	20	WD	WD	WD		19	25	23	Ret	19	C	17	21	34†	0
38	(Greece) Georgis Markogiannis							26	23	30	Ret	22	27		14	18	28	35†	34†	C	26	33	30	0
39	(Australia) Marcos Flack	19	21	29†	23	14	24	WD	WD	WD														0
40	(Switzerland) Ethan Ischer	15	22	26	Ret	Ret	15	24	18	21	23	20	22	19		20	25	16	Ret	C	25	Ret	24	0
41	(Thailand) Nandhavud Bhirombhakdi							19	17	26								15	36†	C	Ret	30	20	0
42	(Mexico) Jesse Carrasquedo Jr.																				23	24	17	0
43	(Belgium) Niels Koolen																	17	30	C	Ret	Ret	28	0
44	(Italy) Giovanni Maschio	Ret	28	21	25	28	26				31	28	30	18	18		32	Ret	DNS	C	Ret	Ret	25	0
45	(Italy) Andrea Frassineti	20	23	30	Ret	25	18	WD	WD	WD	33	23	24	20		19	31	19	Ret	C	27	35†	33	0
46	(Singapore) Rishab Jain	21	26	24	21	30	20	29	27	29	27	Ret	21		20	Ret	DNQ	28	29	C				0
47	(Italy) Manuel Quondamcarlo				20	26	22				32	24	26											0
48	(Mexico) Ricardo Escotto	Ret	20	Ret				28	33†	22														0
49	(Uzbekistan) Ismoilkhuja Akhmedkhodjaev	22	27	22	24	31	25	31	28	32	30	31†	32†	21		22	DNQ	25	33	C	29	31	32	0
50	(Argentina) Juan Francisco Soldavini														23	24	DNQ	21	27	C				0
51	(France) Raphaël Narac																	22	39†	C				0
52	(Belgium) Jef Machiels																	23	25	C	Ret	32	26	0
53	(Brazil) Nelson Neto										28	25	25											0
54	(Brazil) Nicholas Monteiro							30	29	31	34	26	31†											0
55	(China) Ruiqi Liu																	Ret	32	C	28	34†	29	0
Pos	Driver	R1	R2	R3	R1	R2	R3	R1	R2	R3	R1	R2	R3	R1	R2	R3	R4	R1	R2	R3	R1	R2	R3	Pts
Pos	Driver	IMO (Italy)			MIS (Italy)			SPA (Belgium)			VLL (Italy)			RBR (Austria)				MNZ (Italy)			MUG (Italy)			Pts

Colour	Result
Gold	Winner
Silver	Second place
Bronze	Third place
Green	Points classification
Blue	Non-points classification
Blue	Non-classified finish (NC)
Purple	Retired, not classified (Ret)
Red	Did not qualify (DNQ)
Red	Did not pre-qualify (DNPQ)
Black	Disqualified (DSQ)
White	Did not start (DNS)
White	Withdrew (WD)
White	Race cancelled (C)
Blank	Did not practice (DNP)
Blank	Did not arrive (DNA)
Blank	Excluded (EX)

**Bold** – Pole
Italics – Fastest Lap
† — Did not finish, but classified

=== Secondary classes standings ===
Pos	Driver	IMO (Italy)			MIS (Italy) (Note: The official standings (for unknown reasons) do not include Domingues' and Bohra's penalties in R1 and R3 respectively.)			SPA (Belgium)			VLL (Italy)			RBR (Austria)				MNZ (Italy)			MUG (Italy)			Pts
Pos	Driver	R1	R2	R3	R1	R2	R3	R1	R2	R3	R1	R2	R3	R1	R2	R3	R4	R1	R2	R3	R1	R2	R3	Pts
Rookies' championship
1	(Italy) Andrea Kimi Antonelli	17†	15	5	1	1	2	1	1	1	1	1	1		1	16	1	6	1	C	1	1	1	378
2	(Brazil) Rafael Câmara	1	4	1	2	4	1	2	2	2	2	Ret	2	13	2		6	2	6	C	4	2	Ret	281
3	(Austria) Charlie Wurz	4	9	3	3	2	19†	4	5	3	4	2	3		3	3	7	1	2	C	3	4	3	247
4	(Australia) James Wharton	2	1	4	4	3	20†	3	3	Ret	3	3	4	1	4		3	23†	10	C	Ret	5	5	227
5	(Norway) Martinius Stenshorne	3	2	2	Ret	5	3	Ret	7	4	5	4	6	5		2	4	22†	3	C	2	6	4	211
6	(United States) Nikhil Bohra	8	8	Ret	6	9	14	5	4	5	7	Ret	5	3		4	5	25†	18	C	6	8	6	123
7	(United States) Ugo Ugochukwu													2		1	2				5	3	2	104
8	(Portugal) Ivan Domingues	5	3	18†	17	6	5	7	6	7	6	5	7	Ret	5		13	26†	WD	C	12	11	Ret	97
9	(Brazil) Emerson Fittipaldi Jr.	6	11	8	5	8	6	8	9	8	11	10	17		12	8	11	5	9	C	8	7	12	71
10	(Italy) Brando Badoer	Ret	21†	11	8	7	8	6	14	6	13	Ret	8	4	6		14	Ret	8	C	7	10	8	69
11	(Germany) Valentin Kluss				10	13	16	12	10	11	8	6	10	10		6	9	4	13	C	11	14	9	40
12	(United Kingdom) Arvid Lindblad													11	10		15	3	5	C	15	Ret	7	32
13	(Italy) Alfio Spina	7	6	9	7	11	7	DNS	23†	9	10	12	Ret	Ret		Ret	DNQ	19	15	C	Ret	13	11	31
14	(Sweden) William Karlsson				Ret	16	10	14	16	10	14	7	11		16†	5	8	7	16	C	16	19	13	28
15	(United States) Arias Deukmedjian	18†	22†	7	Ret	10	4	10	18	Ret														20
16	(Malta) Zachary David														Ret	7	10	24†	4	C				19
17	(Denmark) Frederik Lund	19†	7	6	Ret	14	22	Ret	8	Ret	21	17	13		11	14	20	12	27†	C	23†	16	20	18
18	(Italy) Valerio Rinicella							9	Ret	14	9	8	9	Ret		11	22	27†	7	C	10	12	15	17
19	(Brazil) Pedro Clerot	12	5	16	9	12	11																	12
20	(South Korea) Kim Hwarang				14	Ret	24†	Ret	22	18	18	19	21		7	10	Ret	8	22	C				11
21	(Belgium) Jules Castro	10	20	14	11	21	25†	13	15	15	12	22†	22	7	9		12	20	11	C	14	15	Ret	9
22	(Republic of Ireland) Adam Fitzgerald										17	20†	Ret	6	14		Ret							8
23	(Italy) Nicola Lacorte													8	Ret		18	Ret	25†	C	13	9	Ret	6
24	(Switzerland) Elia Sperandio	16	10	10	13	19	23	16	13	19	27†	Ret	14	12	8		16	14	12	C	17	17	23	6
25	(Italy) Victoria Blokhina	11	19†	20	12	15	21	17	17	16	16	9	12	9		9	19	17	14	C	22†	18	16	6
26	(Switzerland) Ethan Ischer	9	13	17	Ret	Ret	9	15	12	12	15	11	16	14		13	17	10	Ret	C	18	Ret	17	5
27	(United States) Akshay Bohra																				9	Ret	10	3
28	(Thailand) Nandhavud Bhirombhakdi							11	11	17								9	26†	C	Ret	20	14	2
29	(Belgium) Niels Koolen																	11	21	C	Ret	Ret	21	0
30	(Italy) Andrea Frassineti	13	14	19†	Ret	17	12	WD	WD	WD	25	13	18	15		12	21	13	Ret	C	19	24†	25	0
31	(Mexico) Ricardo Escotto	Ret	12	Ret				18	24†	13														0
32	(Italy) Giovanni Maschio	Ret	18	12	19	20	18				23	18	23					Ret	DNS	C	Ret	Ret	18	0
33	(Singapore) Rishab Jain	14	16	15	16	22	13	19	19	20	19	Ret	15		13	Ret	DNQ	21	20	C				0
34	(Uzbekistan) Ismoilkhuja Akhmedkhodjaev	15	17	13	18	23	17	21	20	22	22	21†	25†	16		15	DNQ	18	24†	C	21	21	24	0
35	(Italy) Manuel Quondamcarlo				15	18	15				24	14	20											0
36	(Argentina) Juan Francisco Soldavini														15	17	DNQ	15	19	C				0
37	(Brazil) Nelson Neto										20	15	19											0
38	(Belgium) Jef Machiels																	16	17	C	Ret	22	19	0
39	(Brazil) Nicholas Monteiro							20	21	21	26	16	24†											0
40	(China) Ruiqi Liu																	Ret	23	C	20	23†	22	0
Women's championship
1	(Spain) Maya Weug	1	1	1†	1	1	1	1	1	1	1	1	1		1	1	1	2†	2	C	1	1	1	400
2	(Italy) Victoria Blokhina	2	2†	2	2	2	2	2	2	2	2	2	2	1		2	2	1	1	C	2†	2	2	309
Pos	Driver	R1	R2	R3	R1	R2	R3	R1	R2	R3	R1	R2	R3	R1	R2	R3	R4	R1	R2	R3	R1	R2	R3	Pts
Pos	Driver	IMO (Italy)			MIS (Italy)			SPA (Belgium)			VLL (Italy)			RBR (Austria)				MNZ (Italy)			MUG (Italy)			Pts

Colour	Result
Gold	Winner
Silver	Second place
Bronze	Third place
Green	Points classification
Blue	Non-points classification
Blue	Non-classified finish (NC)
Purple	Retired, not classified (Ret)
Red	Did not qualify (DNQ)
Red	Did not pre-qualify (DNPQ)
Black	Disqualified (DSQ)
White	Did not start (DNS)
White	Withdrew (WD)
White	Race cancelled (C)
Blank	Did not practice (DNP)
Blank	Did not arrive (DNA)
Blank	Excluded (EX)

† — Did not finish, but classified

=== Teams' championship ===
Each team acquired the points earned by their two best drivers in each race.

Pos	Team	IMO (Italy)			MIS (Italy)			SPA (Belgium)			VLL (Italy)			RBR (Austria)				MNZ (Italy)			MUG (Italy)			Pts
Pos	Team	R1	R2	R3	R1	R2	R3	R1	R2	R3	R1	R2	R3	R1	R2	R3	R4	R1	R2	R3	R1	R2	R3	Pts
1	(Italy) Prema Racing	1	3	2	1	1	1	1	1	1	1	1	1	2	1	2	2	1	1	C	1	1	1	800
1	(Italy) Prema Racing	4	8	7	2	2	2	2	4	2	2	3	2	3	2	3	3	4	2	C	4	3	2	800
2	(Germany) US Racing	2	1	1	3	5	3	5	2	5	4	4	6	1	3	1	1	2	6	C	2	2	7	511
2	(Germany) US Racing	8	2	3	8	10	4	9	6	6	6	5	7	4	4	7	5	3	7	C	7	4	11	511
3	(Germany) PHM Racing	3	9	4	9	9	9	6	3	9	5	2	5	7	21	5	7	5	4	C	9	14	6	181
3	(Germany) PHM Racing	6	10	6	17	12	28†	7	25	17	11	9	12	11		13	9	10	11	C	12	15	10	181
4	(Netherlands) Van Amersfoort Racing	5	5	5	10	7	6	11	11	8	10	10	9	5	10	4	8	7	3	C	3	8	4	151 (Note: In the official standings, the team has wrongly allocated 1 point (instead of 0) for SPA R1.)
4	(Netherlands) Van Amersfoort Racing	11	19	15	13	13	10	15	14	11	19	19	13	6	13	14	18	9	9	C	10	10	8	151
5	(Italy) Iron Dames	10	6	28†	7	11	8	13	10	15	13	11	8		7	8	11	37†	28	C	14	9	15	36
6	(Italy) Iron Lynx	9	7	27†	22	8	11	12	8	12	12	12	10	10	8		20	36†	35†	C	18	12	Ret	22 (Note: In the official standings, the team has wrongly allocated 1 point (instead of 4) for MIS R2 and 10 points (instead of 0) for VLL R2.)
6	(Italy) Iron Lynx													Ret	Ret		26	Ret	WD	C	19	16	Ret	22
7	(France) R-ace GP	19	13	11	23	14	24	Ret	13	Ret	25	27	18	8	16	21	30	18	5	C	31†	25	25	14
7	(France) R-ace GP	27†	21	29†	Ret	22	31	WD	WD	WD	29	30	Ret		22		Ret	22	38†	C	Ret	Ret	27	14
8	(Switzerland) Jenzer Motorsport	15	22	14	15	20	15	19	15	19	16	14	15	14	19	11	16	8	19	C	16	19	12	4
8	(Switzerland) Jenzer Motorsport	24†	25	26	Ret	Ret	23	20	16	20	23	20	22	19		20	23	15	20	C	17	21	20	4
9	(Italy) BVM Racing				19	24	16	23	24	18	22	15	16	Ret	11	10	15	13	22	C	22	18	14	1
9	(Italy) BVM Racing				Ret	Ret	33†	Ret	30	27	26	29	28		24†	16	Ret	14	23	C	Ret	29	19	1
10	(San Marino) AKM Motorsport	18	11	22	14	19	17	16	28	23	17	16	14	21		17	33	25	12	C	15	17	22	0
10	(San Marino) AKM Motorsport	22	27	25	24	31	25	31	Ret	32	30	31†	32†	Ret		22	DNQ	38†	32	C	28	31	29	0
11	(Germany) BWR Motorsports	12	12	18	12	18	13	29	27	14	18	21	21		20	Ret	DNQ	28	29	C				0
11	(Germany) BWR Motorsports	21	26	24	21	30	20	DNS	32†	29	27	Ret	Ret											0
12	(Switzerland) Maffi Racing	23	17	19	18	27	32	25	19	28	35†	Ret	20	16	12	24	24	20	18	C	24	26	31	0
12	(Switzerland) Maffi Racing														23		DNQ	21	27	C				0
13	(Italy) Cram Motorsport	Ret	20	Ret				26	23	22	28	22	25		14	18	28	35†	34†	C	26	33	30	0
13	(Italy) Cram Motorsport							28	29	30	34	25	27											0
14	(Spain) Monlau Motorsport																	17	25	C	23	24	17	0
14	(Spain) Monlau Motorsport																	23	30	C	Ret	32	26	0
15	(Slovenia) AS Motorsport	Ret	28	21	20	26	22				31	24	26	18	18		32	Ret	DNS	C				0
15	(Slovenia) AS Motorsport				25	28	26				32	28	30											0
16	(Italy) Cars Racing	20	23	30	Ret	25	18	WD	WD	WD	33	23	24	20		19	31	19	Ret	C	27	35†	33	0
Pos	Team	R1	R2	R3	R1	R2	R3	R1	R2	R3	R1	R2	R3	R1	R2	R3	R4	R1	R2	R3	R1	R2	R3	Pts
Pos	Team	IMO (Italy)			MIS (Italy)			SPA (Belgium)			VLL (Italy)			RBR (Austria)				MNZ (Italy)			MUG (Italy)			Pts

Colour	Result
Gold	Winner
Silver	Second place
Bronze	Third place
Green	Points classification
Blue	Non-points classification
Blue	Non-classified finish (NC)
Purple	Retired, not classified (Ret)
Red	Did not qualify (DNQ)
Red	Did not pre-qualify (DNPQ)
Black	Disqualified (DSQ)
White	Did not start (DNS)
White	Withdrew (WD)
White	Race cancelled (C)
Blank	Did not practice (DNP)
Blank	Did not arrive (DNA)
Blank	Excluded (EX)

**Bold** – Pole
Italics – Fastest Lap
† — Did not finish, but classified
