= Frederik Lund =

Nicaraguan-Danish racing driver (born 2007)

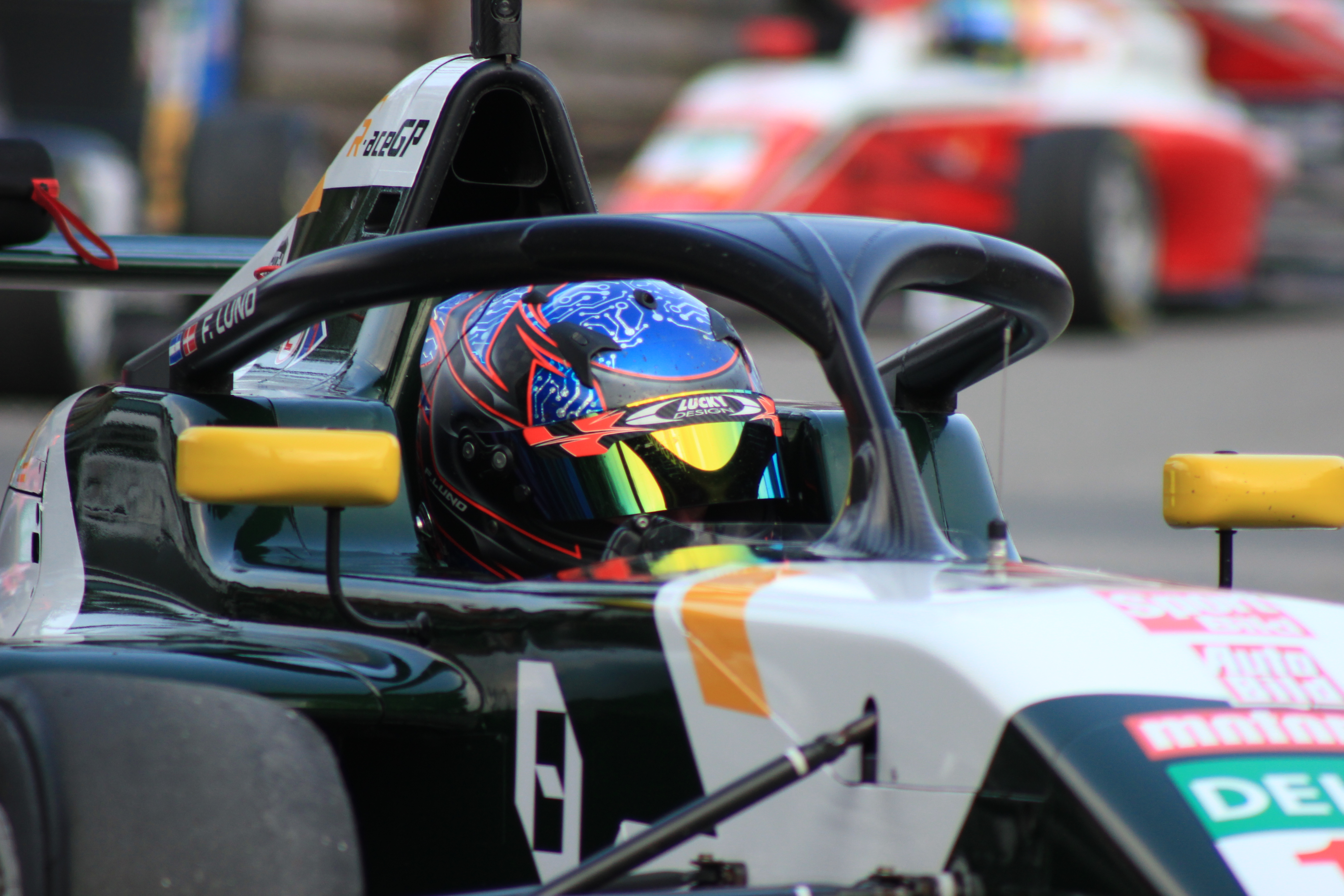
- Lund before the ADAC Formula 4 race at Circuit de Spa-Francorchamps in 2022
- Nationality: (Denmark) Danish (Nicaragua) Nicaraguan
- Born: 14 April 2007 (age 19) Managua, Nicaragua

Italian F4 Championship career
- Debut season: 2022
- Current team: R-ace GP
- Car number: 14
- Starts: 20
- Wins: 0
- Podiums: 0
- Poles: 1
- Fastest laps: 0
- Best finish: 29th in 2022

Frederik Lund (born 14 April 2007) is a Nicaraguan-Danish former racing driver who competed in several junior single-seater championships including the Italian F4 Championship, U.S. F2000 National Championship, Formula Winter Series, and the Euro 4 Championship.

Lund began his car racing career in 2021 after progressing through international karting competitions.

Following his participation in junior formula racing championships, Lund stepped away from full-time professional racing competition and has since focused on academic studies and alpine sports including skiing and mountaineering.

== Early life ==
Lund was born in Managua, Nicaragua, and holds dual Danish and Nicaraguan citizenship. He spent parts of his childhood between Central America, primarily Costa Rica, and Europe.

During his early years, Lund developed an interest in motorsport and began karting as a junior driver. Karting served as the foundation of his racing development and introduced him to competitive motorsport environments at an early age.

Through karting, Lund gained experience racing in large junior grids and developed the technical skills required for progression into single-seater racing categories.

== Karting career ==
Prior to entering formula racing, Lund competed in karting competitions during his early teenage years. Karting is widely considered the primary development stage for aspiring professional racing drivers.

During his karting career, Lund competed in several junior karting competitions and development series. These competitions provided experience in racecraft, vehicle control, and strategy, which are key skills for drivers transitioning to single-seater formula cars.

Lund's performances in karting eventually led to opportunities to test Formula 4 machinery and progress into junior single-seater championships.

== Career ==
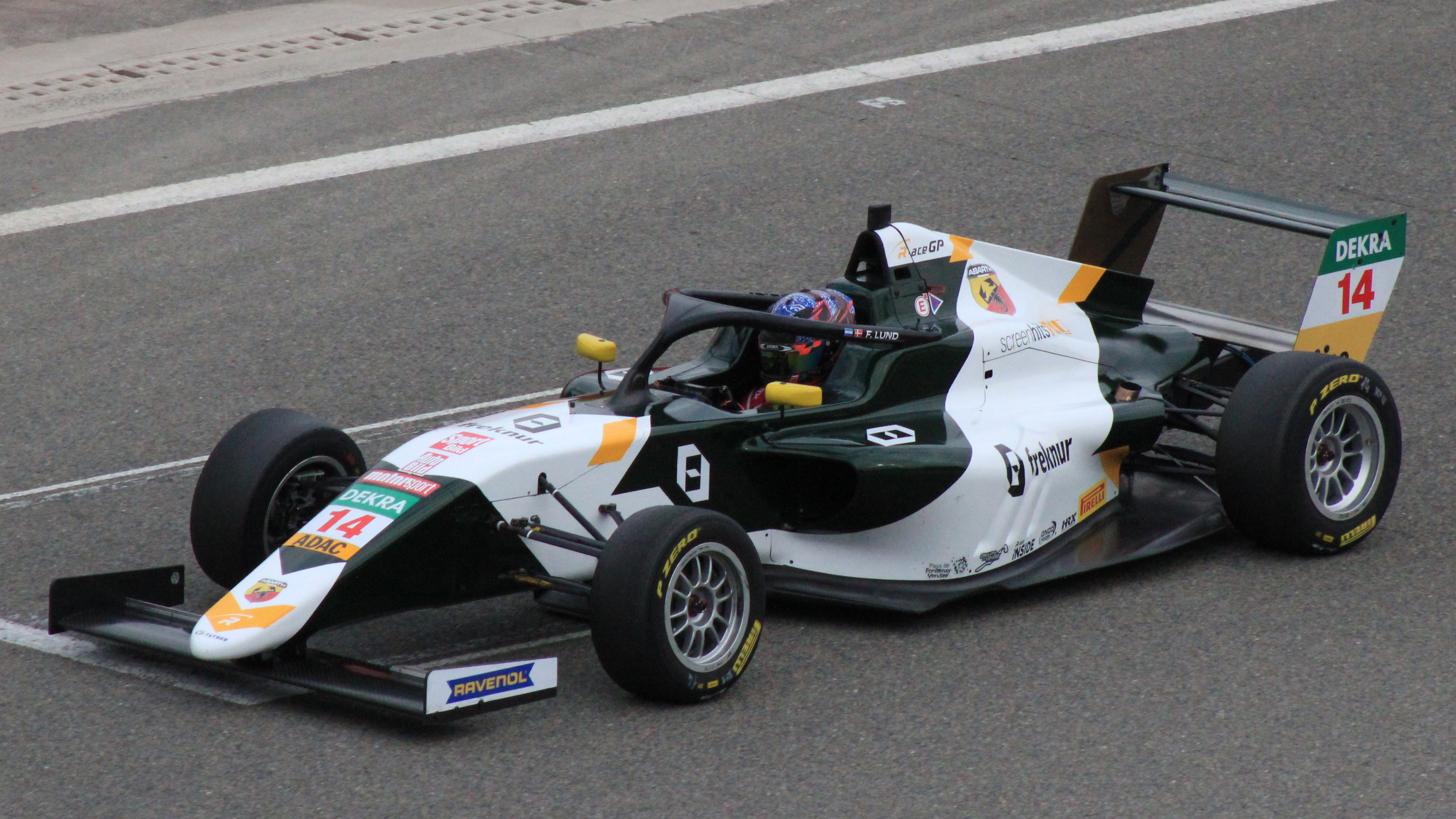
Lund in a Tatuus Formula 4 car in 2022

=== 2021: F4 Danish Championship ===
Lund made his debut in car racing during the 2021 season, when he competed in the F4 Danish Championship with Team FormulaSport.

Lund entered the championship at the final rounds held at Ring Djursland. Despite limited experience in formula cars, Lund demonstrated competitive pace and secured a second-place finish in one of the races.

Lund finished the season 14th overall with 30 points.

=== 2022: Italian Formula 4 Championship ===
In 2022, Lund joined R-ace GP to compete in the Italian F4 Championship.

The Italian F4 Championship is considered one of the most competitive junior single-seater championships in the world.

At the opening round at Imola, a rain-affected qualifying session allowed Lund to secure pole position for the second race.

Despite the strong qualifying result, Lund did not score points during the season.

=== U.S. F2000 Championship ===
During the same year, Lund also competed in selected rounds of the U.S. F2000 National Championship with Jay Howard Driver Development.

Lund competed at the rounds held at the Grand Prix of St. Petersburg and the Honda Indy Toronto.

=== 2023: Formula Winter Series ===
At the beginning of the 2023 season, Lund joined US Racing in the Formula Winter Series.

During the championship, Lund achieved several podium finishes and finished third overall in the standings.

Later that year, Lund competed in the Italian F4 Championship with AKM Motorsport and the Euro 4 Championship with Van Amersfoort Racing.

== Activities after racing ==
Following his participation in junior formula racing championships, Lund stepped away from full-time professional racing.

Lund has since focused on academic studies and outdoor sports. In particular, he has pursued alpine skiing and mountaineering, taking part in alpine climbing and high-altitude mountain activities in Europe.

While he stepped away from active competition in junior formula racing, Lund has not ruled out a potential return to professional motorsport in the future.

== Personal life ==
Outside of motorsport, Lund has interests in outdoor sports and alpine environments.

Many drivers at junior levels balance racing careers with academic education and training programs. Following his time in formula racing, Lund has focused on continuing his education while also pursuing mountaineering and alpine skiing.

== Racing record ==
=== Career summary ===
Season	Series	Team	Races	Wins	Poles	F/Laps	Podiums	Points	Position
2021	F4 Danish Championship	Team FormulaSport	5	0	0	0	1	30	14th
2022	YACademy Winter Series	Jay Howard Driver Development	3	0	0	0	0	18	10th
2022	USF2000 Championship	Jay Howard Driver Development	4	0	0	0	0	15	26th
2022	Italian F4 Championship	R-ace GP	20	0	1	0	0	0	29th
2022	ADAC Formula 4 Championship	R-ace GP	3	0	0	0	0	0	NC†
2023	Formula Winter Series	US Racing	8	0	0	1	4	106	**3rd**
2023	Italian F4 Championship	AKM Motorsport	15	0	0	0	0	0	37th
2023	Euro 4 Championship	Van Amersfoort Racing	9	0	0	0	0	4	17th

=== American open-wheel racing results ===
==== U.S. F2000 National Championship ====
(key) (Races in bold indicate pole position) (Races in italics indicate fastest lap) (Races with * indicate most race laps led)

Year	Team	1	2	3	4	5	6	7	8	9	10	11	12	13	14	15	16	17	18	Rank	Points
2022	Jay Howard Driver Development	STP; 1; 14	STP; 2; 17	ALA; 1	ALA; 2	IMS; 1	IMS; 2	IMS; 3	IRP	ROA; 1	ROA; 2	MOH; 1	MOH; 2	MOH; 3	TOR; 1; 15	TOR; 2; 13	POR; 1	POR; 2	POR; 3	26th	25

=== Complete Italian F4 Championship results ===
(key) (Races in bold indicate pole position) (Races in italics indicate fastest lap)

Year	Team	1	2	3	4	5	6	7	8	9	10	11	12	13	14	15	16	17	18	19	20	21	22	DC	Points
2022	R-ace GP	IMO; 1; 27†	**IMO**; **2**; 13	IMO; 3; 11	MIS; 1 Ret	MIS; 2; 22	MIS; 3; 31	SPA; 1 Ret	SPA; 2; 13	SPA; 3 Ret	VLL; 1; 29	VLL; 2; 27	VLL; 3; 18	RBR; 1	RBR; 2; 16	RBR; 3; 21	RBR; 4; 30	MNZ; 1; 18	MNZ; 2; 38†	MNZ; 3 C	MUG; 1; 31†	MUG; 2; 25	MUG; 3; 27	29th	0
2023	AKM Motorsport	IMO; 1	IMO; 2	IMO; 3	IMO; 4	MIS; 1 Ret	MIS; 2 Ret	MIS; 3; 24	SPA; 1; 23	SPA; 2; 22	SPA; 3; 16	MNZ; 1 Ret	MNZ; 2; 17	MNZ; 3; 25	LEC; 1 Ret	LEC; 2; 18	LEC; 3 Ret	MUG; 1; 23	MUG; 2; 23	MUG; 3 Ret	VLL; 1	VLL; 2	VLL; 3	37th	0

=== Complete Formula Winter Series results ===
(key) (Races in bold indicate pole position; races in italics indicate fastest lap)

Year	Team	1	2	3	4	5	6	7	8	DC	Points
2023	US Racing	JER; 1; 2	JER; 2; 4	CRT; 1; 3	CRT; 2; 2	NAV; 1; 2	NAV; 2 Ret	CAT; 2; 4	CAT; 2; 4	3rd	106

=== Complete Euro 4 Championship results ===
(key) (Races in bold indicate pole position; races in italics indicate fastest lap)

Year	Team	1	2	3	4	5	6	7	8	9	DC	Points
2023	Van Amersfoort Racing	MUG; 1; 24†	MUG; 2; 13	MUG; 3; 14	MNZ; 1; 14	MNZ; 2; 14	MNZ; 3; 13	CAT; 1; 14	CAT; 2; 9	CAT; 3; 14	17th	4
