= Maya Weug =

Dutch, Spanish, and Belgian racing driver (born 2004)

- Weug in 2026
- Nationality: (Netherlands) Dutch; (Spain) Spanish; (Belgium) Belgian (Note: Weug, a triple citizen, competed under Spanish and Belgian racing licences earlier in her career. Since 2022, she has represented the Netherlands.)
- Born: Maya Martine Els Weug; 1 June 2004 (age 22) Benissa, Valencian Community, Spain

F1 Academy
- Categorisation: FIA Silver
- Years active: 2024–2025
- Teams: Prema Racing, MP Motorsport
- Car number: 64
- Starts: 27 (28 entries)
- Wins: 4
- Podiums: 17
- Poles: 3
- Fastest laps: 3
- Best finish: 2nd in 2025

Previous series
- 2023–2025; 2021–2022; 2021–2022: FR European; Italian F4; ADAC F4

Championship titles
- 2021–2022: Italian F4 Woman Trophy

Maya Martine Els Weug (born 1 June 2004) is a Dutch, Spanish, and Belgian racing driver competing in Belcar for ART Racing.

She previously finished third in F1 Academy in 2024 with Prema Racing and runner-up in 2025 with MP Motorsport, and scored points in the 2023 Formula Regional European Championship for KIC Motorsport. She has been a Ferrari junior since 2021—the first female driver ever to join the programme.

== Career ==
=== Karting ===
Weug started karting when she was seven years old. She has competed in multiple national championships, such as the Spanish Karting Championship, where she finished second in the Alevin Class in 2015. 2016 was Weug's first year on the international karting stage, where she would immediately show her talent, winning the WSK Final Cup in the 60 Mini category, where she beat fellow future Ferrari Driver Academy member Dino Beganovic. In the next four years, Weug continued to compete on the international karting stage, making appearances in both the CIK-FIA Karting European Championship and Karting World Championship; her best result in the former ended up being a 17th place in 2020.

In October 2020, Weug was nominated as one of twenty female drivers of ages between 12 and 16 to compete in the Girls on Track - Rising Stars programme organized by the FIA Women in Motorsport Commission, with the reward for the victor of the shootout being a place in the Ferrari Driver Academy. Weug made it into the final selection stage alongside Doriane Pin, Julia Ayoub and Antonella Bassani, and on 22 January it was announced that she had won the shootout and would be joining the FDA.

=== Formula 4 ===
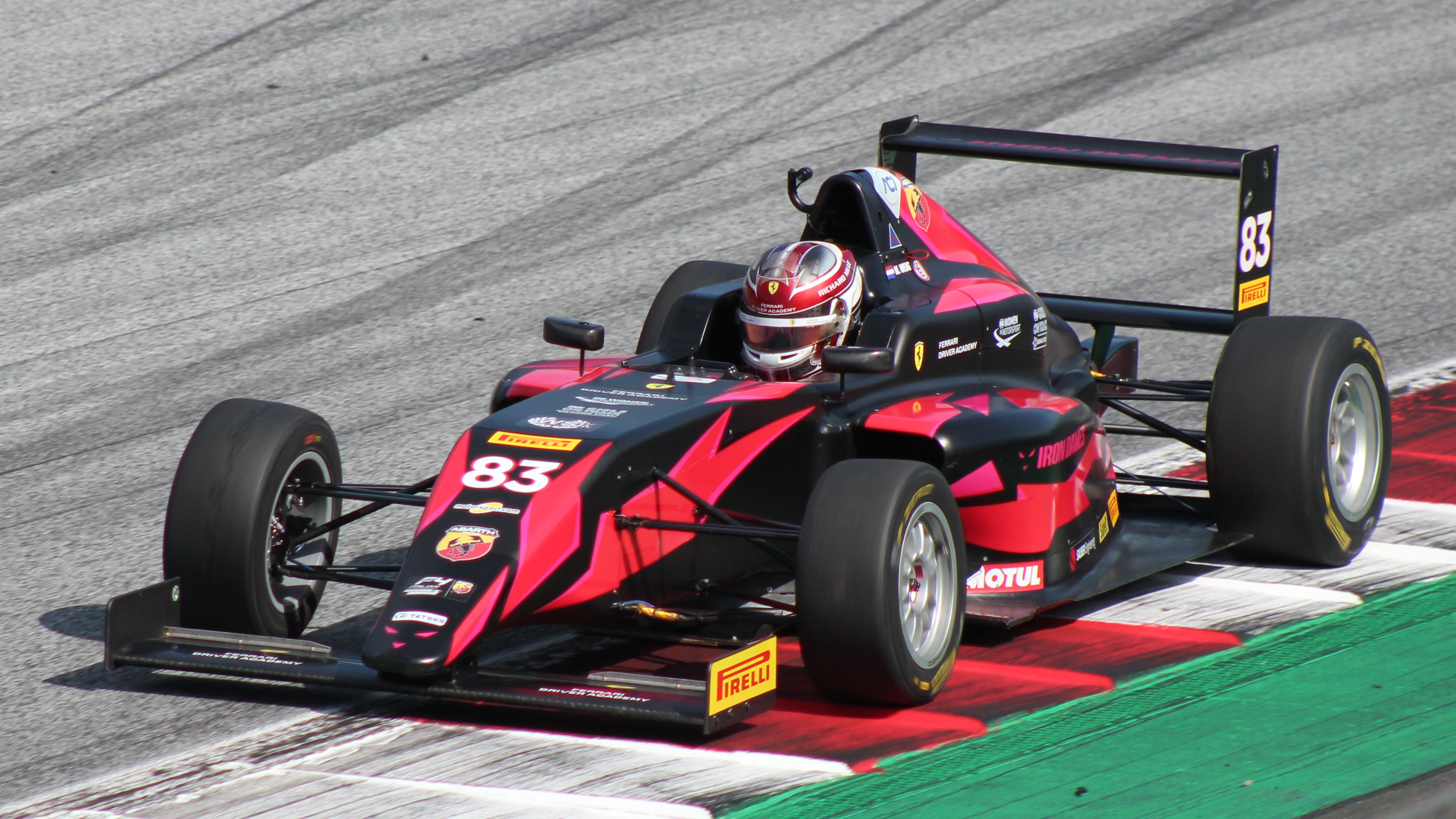
Weug driving at the Red Bull Ring during the 2021 Italian F4 Championship.

==== 2021 ====
In 2021, Weug made her debut in Italian F4 for Iron Lynx Motorsport Lab as a part of the Iron Dames program, in association with her FDA-membership. Driving alongside the Italian pairing of Leonardo Fornaroli and Pietro Armanni, Weug would score three rookie podiums, one each at Le Castellet, Misano and Vallelunga, however she would miss out on scoring any points in the main championship, thus ending up 35th in the standings. In an interview, Weug stated that "we were so close so many times [to score points]", and said that her lack of experience hindered her throughout the season.

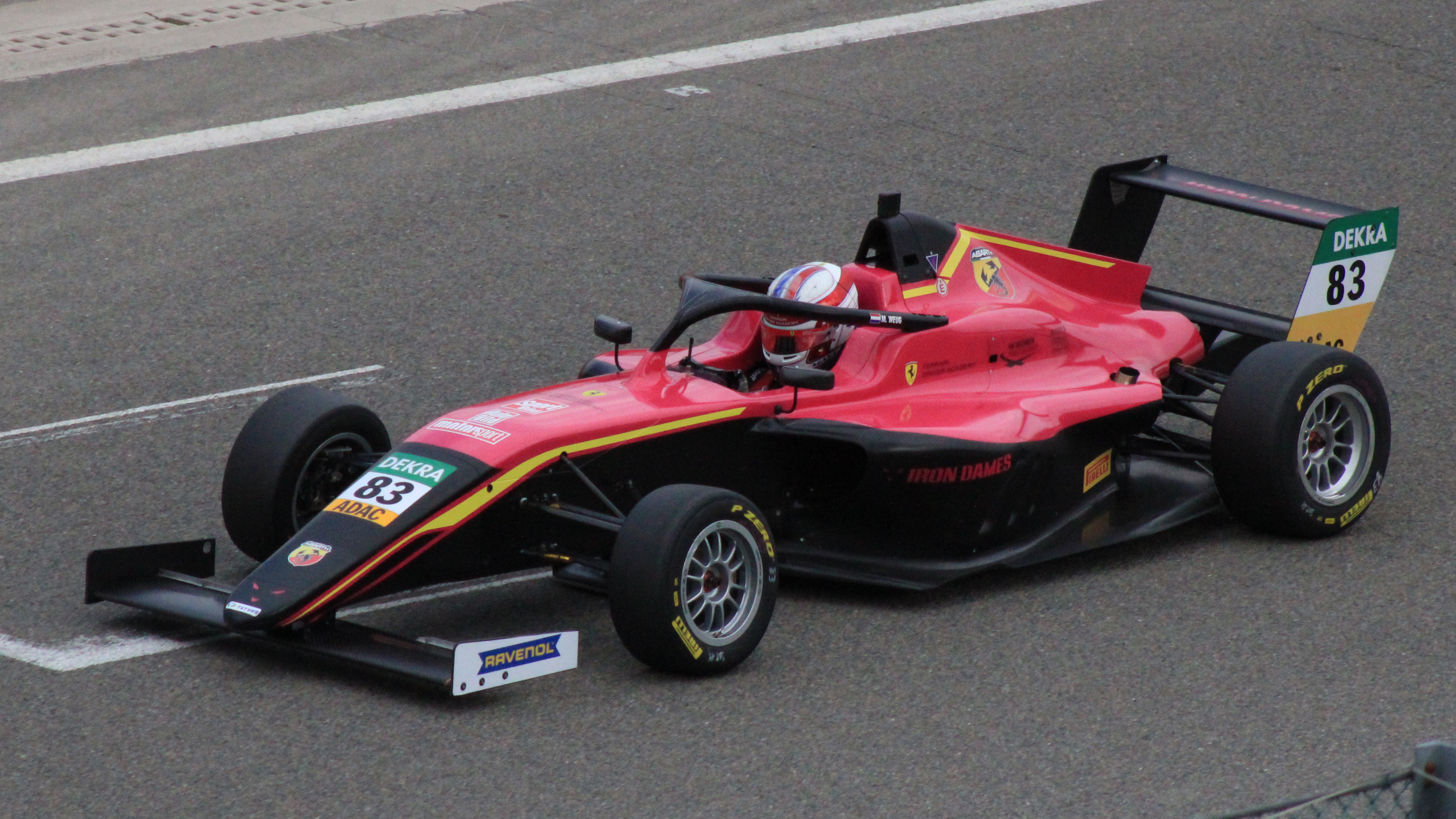
Weug driving at Spa-Francorchamps during the 2022 ADAC Formula 4 Championship.

==== 2022 ====
For the 2022 season, Weug would remain with Iron Dames, partnering Ivan Domingues. A mixed-weather qualifying session in the opening round at the Imola Circuit enabled Weug to start third in both races on Sunday, and after scoring her first point in Race 1, she would finish sixth on Sunday. At the following round in Misano, Weug continued this run of form by scoring yet more points, and despite a heavy collision at the end of Race 3, she would be classified eighth due to the countback rule. Weug took a tenth place from the next meeting at Spa-Francorchamps, before yet another top-ten finish at Vallelunga. Having scored points in three more races during the remainder of the season, Weug was placed 14th in the championship, one place ahead of teammate Domingues.

=== Formula Regional ===
==== 2023 ====
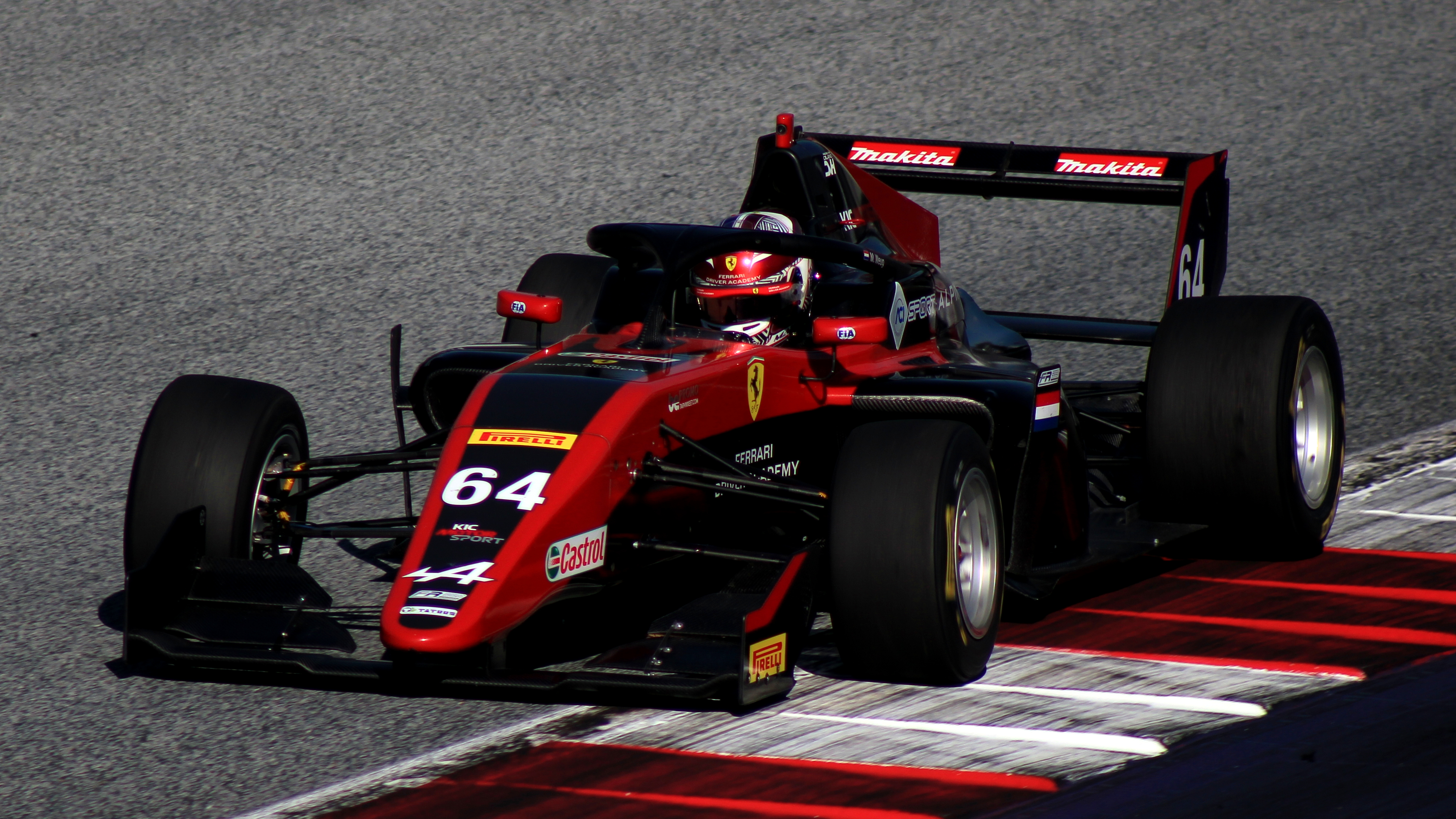
Weug driving at the Red Bull Ring during the 2023 Formula Regional European Championship.

Having taken part in several post-season tests with KIC Motorsport, Weug would progress to the Formula Regional European Championship, driving for the Finnish outfit. She achieved her best result in the second race at Spa-Francorchamps, with a rookie win and sixth place overall classification. She was the only KIC Motorsport driver to score any points during the season, finishing in a points position 6 times for a total of 27 points. Weug finished the 2023 FRECA season third among rookies, and 17th among all 42 drivers eligible for points.

==== 2024 ====
Weug returned to the Formula Regional European Championship in 2024 with KIC Motorsport for the Mugello round.

==== 2025 ====
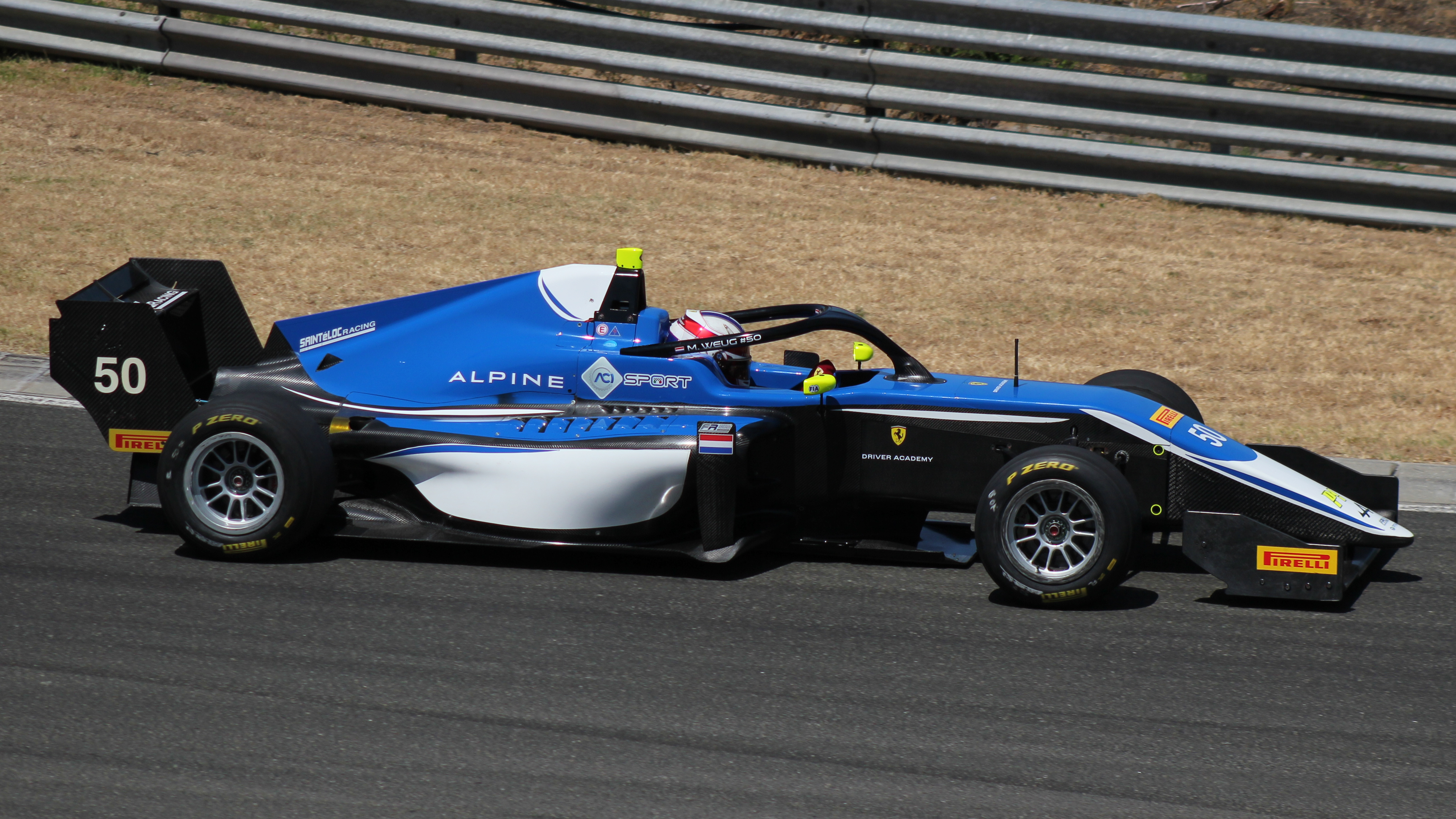
Weug driving at the Hungaroring during the 2025 Formula Regional European Championship.

Weug placed 39th after she made a comeback with Saintéloc Racing during the fourth round of the Formula Regional European Championship, replacing an injured Tim Gerhards.

=== F1 Academy ===
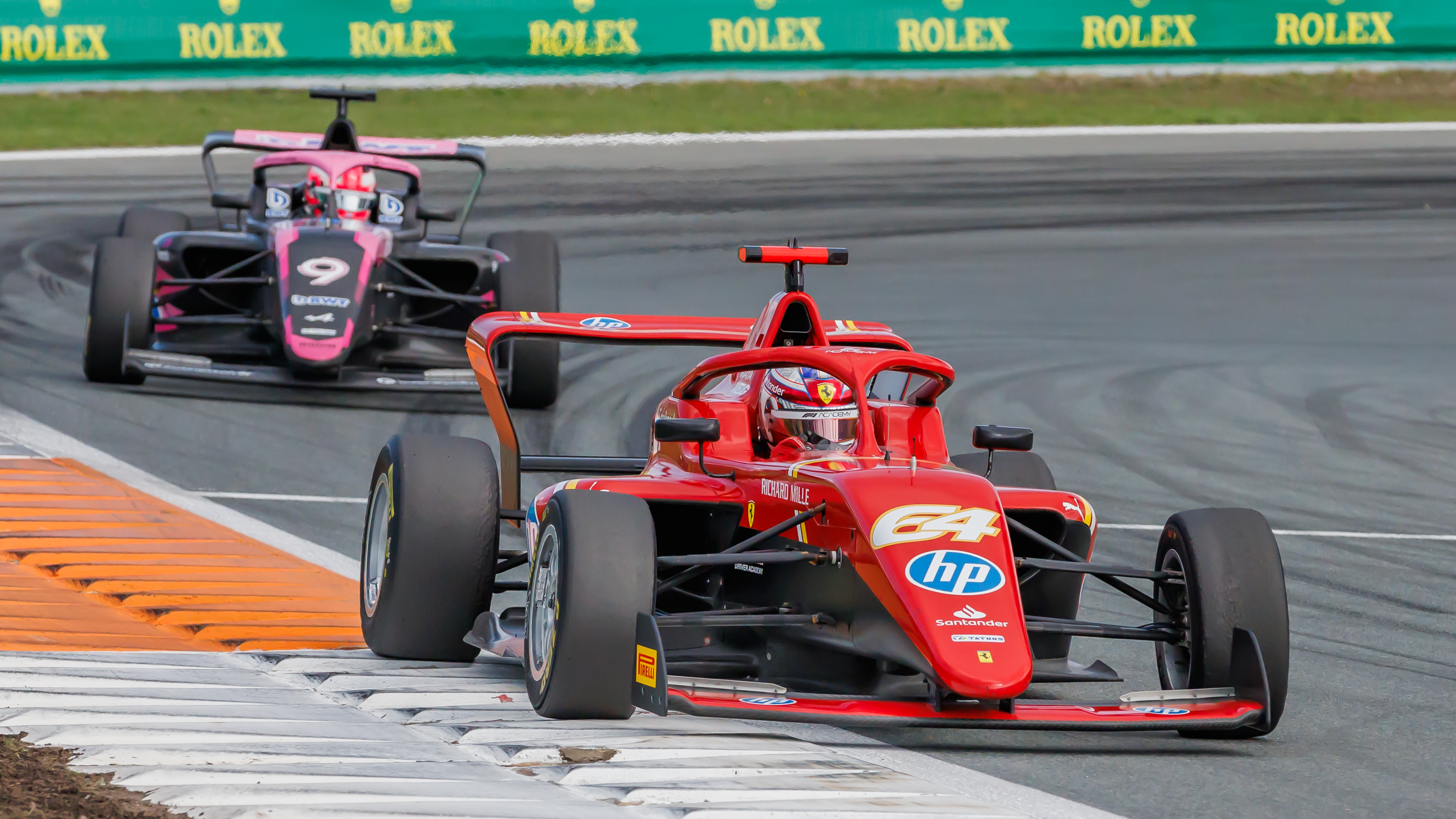
Weug leads Abbi Pulling in an F1 Academy race at Zandvoort in 2024.

Weug moved to F1 Academy for the 2024 season, racing with Prema Racing and representing Scuderia Ferrari. She ended the season third overall with one win, eight podiums, and one fastest lap. Her maiden victory was in Race 3 at Abu Dhabi.

Weug retained her Ferrari backing for the 2025 season, but switched teams to MP Motorsport. Weug won her first race of the season in Race 2 at Jeddah, and she also won her home race in Race 2 at Zandvoort. She claimed her third win of the season in Race 2 at Singapore. Over the season, she secured three wins and nine podiums. Weug and Doriane Pin were the main title contenders heading into the season finale at Las Vegas, the first time the championship had ever been decided in the final race. Weug ultimately finished second overall.

=== FIA Formula 3 ===
Weug was selected to take part in a one-day FIA Formula 3 test at Magny-Cours in November 2021, alongside fellow Iron Dames racer Doriane Pin and W Series drivers Nerea Martí and Irina Sidorkova.

=== GT3 ===
For placing second in the 2025 F1 Academy drivers' championship, Weug was given an opportunity to test a Ferrari 296 GT3 with AF Corse on 8 December 2025, fully funded by F1 Academy.

== Personal life ==
Weug was born in Benissa, Alicante, Spain to a Dutch father and a Belgian mother. She has competed under the flags of all three nations across her career. She speaks English, Dutch, Spanish, Catalan (Valencian), and Italian.

== Karting record ==
=== Karting career summary ===
Season	Series	Team	Position
2013	Spanish Championship — Alevin		14th
2014	Formula de Campeones — Alevin		4th
2015	WSK Super Master Series — 60 Mini	Weug, Johan	57th
2015	Spanish Championship — Alevin		**2nd**
2015	Copa de Campeones — Alevin		**1st**
2016	WSK Champions Cup — 60 Mini	Morcia, Giuseppe	NC
2016	X30 Challenge Europa — Mini ROK	Morcia, Giuseppe	4th
2016	Italian Championship — 60 Mini	Morcia, Giuseppe	15th
2016	South Garda Winter Cup — Mini ROK	Morcia, Giuseppe	9th
2016	WSK Super Master Series — 60 Mini	Morcia, Giuseppe	38th
2016	WSK Night Edition — 60 Mini	Morcia, Giuseppe	4th
2016	WSK Final Cup — 60 Mini	Morcia, Giuseppe	**1st**
2017	WSK Champions Cup — OKJ	Pescador, Luis	24th
2017	WSK Super Master Series — OKJ	Pescador, Luis	62nd
2017	CIK-FIA European Championship — OKJ	Pescador, Luis	NC†
2017	CIK-FIA World Championship — OKJ	BKC Racing	36th
2017	WSK Final Cup — OKJ	Novalux Srl	13th
2018	WSK Champions Cup — OKJ	Novalux Srl	26th
2018	WSK Super Master Series — OKJ	Novalux Srl	23rd
2018	CIK-FIA European Championship — OKJ	Novalux Srl	28th
2018	CIK-FIA World Championship — OKJ	Novalux Srl	16th
2018	WSK Final Cup — OKJ	Novalux Srl	19th
2019	South Garda Winter Cup — OK	Birel ART Racing	NC
2019	WSK Super Master Series — OK	Birel ART Racing	23rd
2019	Championnat de France — OK	Birel ART Racing	20th
2019	CIK-FIA European Championship — OK	Birel ART Racing	51st
2019	CIK-FIA World Championship — OK	Birel ART Racing	63rd
2020	WSK Super Master Series — OK	Birel ART Racing	38th
2020	CIK-FIA European Championship — OK	Birel ART Racing	17th
2020	WSK Euro Series — OK	Birel ART Racing	12th
2020	Champions of the Future — OK	Birel ART Racing	36th
2020	CIK-FIA World Championship — OK	Birel ART Racing	36th

^{†} As Weug was a guest driver, she was ineligible to score points.

=== Complete Karting World Championship results ===
Year	Team	Car	Quali Heats	Main race
2017	(United Kingdom) BKC Racing	OKJ	36th	**DNQ**
2018	(Italy) Novalux Srl	OKJ	16th	**16th**
2019	(Italy) Birel ART Racing	OK	63rd	**DNQ**
2020	(Italy) Birel ART Racing	OK	30th	**DNS**

=== Complete CIK-FIA Karting European Championship results ===
(key) (Races in bold indicate pole position) (Races in italics indicate fastest lap)

Year	Team	Class	1	2	3	4	5	6	7	8	9	10	DC	Points
2017	Luis, Pescador	OKJ	SAR; QH; 57	SAR; R DNQ	CAY; QH	CAY; R	LEM; QH	LEM; R	ALA; QH	ALA; R	KRI; QH	KRI; R	NC†	0
2018	Novalux Srl	OKJ	SAR; QH; 22	SAR; R 11	PFI; QH; 38	PFI; R DNQ	AMP; QH; 30	AMP; R 29	ALB; QH	ALB; R			28th	5
2019	Birel ART Racing	OK	ANG; QH; 29	ANG; R 32	GEN; QH; 40	GEN; R DNQ	KRI; QH; 46	KRI; R DNQ	LEM; QH; 39	LEM; R DNQ			51st	0
2020	Birel ART Racing	OK	ZUE; QH; 15	ZUE; R 9	SAR; QH; 19	SAR; R 34	WAC; QH; 25	WAC; R 20					17th	7

== Racing record ==
=== Racing career summary ===
Season	Series	Team	Races	Wins	Poles	F/Laps	Podiums	Points	Position
2021	Italian F4 Championship	Iron Lynx	21	0	0	0	0	0	35th
2021	ADAC Formula 4 Championship	Iron Lynx	6	0	0	0	0	0	NC†
2022	Italian F4 Championship	Iron Dames	20	0	0	0	0	36	14th
2022	ADAC Formula 4 Championship	Iron Dames	6	0	0	0	0	0	NC†
2023	Formula Regional European Championship	KIC Motorsport	20	0	0	0	0	27	17th
2024	F1 Academy	Prema Racing	14	1	0	1	8	177	**3rd**
2024	Formula Regional European Championship	KIC Motorsport	2	0	0	0	0	0	29th
2025	F1 Academy	MP Motorsport	13	3	3	2	9	157	**2nd**
2025	Formula Regional European Championship	Saintéloc Racing	2	0	0	0	0	0	39th
2026	Belcar Endurance Championship	ART Racing	3	0	0	0	2	0	NC
2026	Euroformula Open Championship	BVM Racing	3	0	0	0	0	20	17th

^{†} As Weug was a guest driver, she was ineligible for championship points.
* Season still in progress.

=== Complete Italian F4 Championship results ===
(key) (Races in bold indicate pole position) (Races in italics indicate fastest lap)

Year	Team	1	2	3	4	5	6	7	8	9	10	11	12	13	14	15	16	17	18	19	20	21	22	DC	Points
2021	Iron Lynx	LEC; 1; 19	LEC; 2; 17	LEC; 3; 15	MIS; 1; 13	MIS; 2; 25	MIS; 3; 12	VLL; 1 Ret	VLL; 2; 11	VLL; 3; 12	IMO; 1; 22	IMO; 2; 14	IMO; 3; 25	RBR; 1; 17	RBR; 2; 14	RBR; 3; 16	MUG; 1; 20	MUG; 2; 17	MUG; 3; 22	MNZ; 1; 21	MNZ; 2; 29	MNZ; 3; 14		35th	0
2022	Iron Dames	IMO; 1; 10	IMO; 2; 6	IMO; 3; 28†	MIS; 1; 7	MIS; 2; 11	MIS; 3; 8	SPA; 1; 13	SPA; 2; 10	SPA; 3; 15	VLL; 1; 13	VLL; 2; 11	VLL; 3; 8	RBR; 1	RBR; 2; 7	RBR; 3; 8	RBR; 4; 11	MNZ; 1; 37†	MNZ; 2; 28	MNZ; 3 C	MUG; 1; 14	MUG; 2; 9	MUG; 3; 15	14th	36

=== Complete ADAC Formula 4 Championship results ===
(key) (Races in bold indicate pole position) (Races in italics indicate fastest lap)

Year	Team	1	2	3	4	5	6	7	8	9	10	11	12	13	14	15	16	17	18	Pos	Points
2021	Iron Lynx	RBR; 1; 15	RBR; 2; 16	RBR; 3; 9	ZAN; 1; 18	ZAN; 2 Ret	ZAN; 3; 15	HOC1; 1	HOC1; 2	HOC1; 3	SAC; 1	SAC; 2	SAC; 3	HOC2; 1	HOC2; 2	HOC2; 3	NÜR; 1	NÜR; 2	NÜR; 3	NC†	0
2022	Iron Dames	SPA; 1; 16	SPA; 2 Ret	SPA; 3; 18	HOC; 1	HOC; 2	HOC; 3	ZAN; 1; 9	ZAN; 2; 11	ZAN; 3 Ret	NÜR1; 1	NÜR1; 2	NÜR1; 3	LAU; 1	LAU; 2	LAU; 3	NÜR2; 1	NÜR2; 2	NÜR2; 3	NC†	0

^{†} As Weug was a guest driver, she was ineligible for championship points.

=== Complete Formula Regional European Championship results ===
(key) (Races in bold indicate pole position) (Races in italics indicate fastest lap)

Year	Team	1	2	3	4	5	6	7	8	9	10	11	12	13	14	15	16	17	18	19	20	DC	Points
2023	KIC Motorsport	IMO; 1; 20	IMO; 2; 14	CAT; 1; 20	CAT; 2; 24	HUN; 1; 19	HUN; 2; 25	SPA; 1; 7	SPA; 2; 6	MUG; 1; 9	MUG; 2 Ret	LEC; 1; 10	LEC; 2; 7	RBR; 1; 19	RBR; 2 Ret	MNZ; 1; 9	MNZ; 2; 13	ZAN; 1; 19	ZAN; 2 Ret	HOC; 1; 18	HOC; 2; 21	17th	27
2024	KIC Motorsport	HOC; 1	HOC; 2	SPA; 1	SPA; 2	ZAN; 1	ZAN; 2	HUN; 1	HUN; 2	MUG; 1	MUG; 2	LEC; 1	LEC; 2	IMO; 1; 22	IMO; 2; 14	RBR; 1	RBR; 2	CAT; 1	CAT; 2	MNZ; 1	MNZ; 2	29th	0
2025	Saintéloc Racing	MIS; 1	MIS; 2	SPA; 1	SPA; 2	ZAN; 1	ZAN; 2	HUN; 1; 22	HUN; 2 Ret	LEC; 1	LEC; 2	IMO; 1	IMO; 2	RBR; 1	RBR; 2	CAT; 1	CAT; 2	HOC; 1	HOC; 2	MNZ; 1	MNZ; 2	39th	0

=== Complete F1 Academy results ===
(key) (Races in bold indicate pole position; races in italics indicate fastest lap)

Year	Team	1	2	3	4	5	6	7	8	9	10	11	12	13	14	15	DC	Points
2024	Prema Racing	JED; 1; 3	JED; 2; 2	MIA; 1; 6	MIA; 2; 5	CAT; 1 Ret	CAT; 2; 13	ZAN; 1; 3	ZAN; 2; 2	SIN; 1; 2	SIN; 2; 2	LSL; 1; 3	LSL; 2 C	YMC; 1; 7	YMC; 2; 5	YMC; 3; 1	3rd	177
2025	MP Motorsport	SHA; 1; 3	**SHA**; **2**; 2	JED; 1; 2	JED; 2; 1	MIA; 1; 4	MIA; 2 C	MTL; 1 Ret	MTL; 2; 9	MTL; 3; 6	ZAN; 1; 3	**ZAN**; **2**; 1	SIN; 1; 2	**SIN**; **2**; 1	LVG; 1 DNS	LVG; 2; 3	2nd	157

=== Complete Euroformula Open Championship results ===
(key) (Races in bold indicate pole position) (Races in italics indicate fastest lap)

Year	Team	1	2	3	4	5	6	7	8	9	10	11	12	13	14	15	16	17	18	19	20	21	22	23	24	DC	Points
2026	BVM Racing	PRT; 1	PRT; 2	PRT; 3	SPA; 1	SPA; 2	SPA; 3	MIS; 1	MIS; 2	MIS; 3	HUN; 1	HUN; 2	HUN; 3	LEC; 1	LEC; 2	LEC; 3	HOC; 1; 8	HOC; 2; 7	HOC; 3; 5	MNZ; 1	MNZ; 2	MNZ; 3	CAT; 1	CAT; 2	CAT; 3	17th	20

== Notes ==
Sporting positions
Preceded by Inaugural	Italian F4 Championship; Women's Champion; 2021–2022	Succeeded by Tina Hausmann
