= 2022 ADAC Formula 4 Championship =

Open-wheel motor racing series

The 2022 ADAC Formula 4 Championship was the eighth and final season of ADAC Formula 4, an open-wheel motor racing series. It was a multi-event motor racing championship that featured drivers competing in 1.4 litre Tatuus-Abarth single seat race cars that conformed to the technical regulations for the championship.

== Teams and drivers ==
Team	No.	Driver	Class	Rounds
(Netherlands) Van Amersfoort Racing	2	(United States) Arias Deukmedjian	G	2–3
(Netherlands) Van Amersfoort Racing	17	(Brazil) Emerson Fittipaldi Jr.	G	2–3
(Netherlands) Van Amersfoort Racing	33	(Italy) Brando Badoer	R G	2–3
(Netherlands) Van Amersfoort Racing	34	(Norway) Martinius Stenshorne	R G	2–3
(Netherlands) Van Amersfoort Racing	96	(Belgium) Jules Castro	R G	2–3
(Germany) BWR Motorsports	3	(Italy) Alfio Spina	R	1–2
(Germany) BWR Motorsports	87	(Singapore) Rishab Jain	R	1
(Germany) BWR Motorsports	89	(Germany) Chris Rosenkranz	R	1–2
(Italy) Prema Racing	7	(Austria) Charlie Wurz		1–4
(Italy) Prema Racing	12	(Italy) Andrea Kimi Antonelli		1–4, 6
(Italy) Prema Racing	13	(Australia) James Wharton	R	1–4, 6
(Italy) Prema Racing	16	(United States) Ugo Ugochukwu	R G	4, 6
(Italy) Prema Racing	20	(Denmark) Conrad Laursen		1–4
(Italy) Prema Racing	88	(Brazil) Rafael Câmara	R	1–3, 6
(Germany) US Racing	11	(Portugal) Pedro Perino	G	1
(Germany) US Racing	30	(Malta) Zachary David (Note: David is a Filipino driver competing under a Maltese licence.)	R	5
(Germany) US Racing	37	(Poland) Kacper Sztuka		1, 5
(Germany) US Racing	44	(Singapore) Nikhil Bohra (Note: Bohra is an American-Indian driver competing under a Singaporean licence.)	R	1–2
(Germany) US Racing	52	(France) Marcus Amand		1–2
(Germany) US Racing	66	(China) Ruiqi Liu	R	5
(France) R-ace GP	14	(Costa Rica) Frederik Lund (Note: Lund is a Danish-Nicaraguan driver competing under a Costa Rican licence.)	R G	1
(France) R-ace GP	71	(Australia) Marcos Flack	G	1
(Germany) PHM Racing	15	(Italy) Nikita Bedrin (Note: Bedrin is a Russian driver who competed under an Italian licence as Russian national emblems were banned by the FIA following the Russian invasion of Ukraine.)		All
(Germany) PHM Racing	19	(Germany) Valentin Kluss	R	3–6
(Germany) PHM Racing	41	(Germany) Jonas Ried		All
(Germany) PHM Racing	77	(United Kingdom) Taylor Barnard		All
(Switzerland) Sauter Engineering + Design	21	(Switzerland) Michael Sauter		All
(Switzerland) Jenzer Motorsport	23	(Ukraine) Oleksandr Partyshev	G	2
(Switzerland) Jenzer Motorsport	24	(Finland) Rasmus Joutsimies	R	All
(Switzerland) Jenzer Motorsport	25	(Switzerland) Samir Ben		2–5
(Switzerland) Jenzer Motorsport	26	(Thailand) Nandhavud Bhirombhakdi	R	1, 3–6
(Switzerland) Jenzer Motorsport	27	(Switzerland) Ethan Ischer	R G	1
(Italy) Iron Dames	83	(Netherlands) Maya Weug	G	1, 3

Icon	Legend
R	Rookie
G	Guest drivers ineligible to score points

== Race calendar and results ==
The provisional calendar was released on 7 November 2021. The opening two rounds supported the 2022 24H GT Series and the next three raced alongside the 2022 ADAC GT Masters. The finale was a part of ADAC Racing Weekend event.

Round		Circuit	Date	Pole position	Fastest lap	Winning driver	Winning team	Rookie winner
1	R1	(Belgium) Circuit de Spa-Francorchamps, Stavelot	23 April	(Italy) Andrea Kimi Antonelli	(Brazil) Rafael Câmara	(Italy) Andrea Kimi Antonelli	(Italy) Prema Racing	(Brazil) Rafael Câmara
1	R2	(Belgium) Circuit de Spa-Francorchamps, Stavelot	23 April	(Italy) Andrea Kimi Antonelli	(Italy) Andrea Kimi Antonelli	(Italy) Andrea Kimi Antonelli	(Italy) Prema Racing	(Brazil) Rafael Câmara
1	R3	(Belgium) Circuit de Spa-Francorchamps, Stavelot	24 April		(Denmark) Conrad Laursen	(Brazil) Rafael Câmara	(Italy) Prema Racing	(Brazil) Rafael Câmara
2	R1	(Germany) Hockenheimring, Hockenheim	14 May	(Italy) Andrea Kimi Antonelli	(Italy) Andrea Kimi Antonelli	(Italy) Andrea Kimi Antonelli	(Italy) Prema Racing	(Brazil) Rafael Câmara
2	R2	(Germany) Hockenheimring, Hockenheim	15 May	(Italy) Andrea Kimi Antonelli	(Italy) Andrea Kimi Antonelli	(Italy) Andrea Kimi Antonelli	(Italy) Prema Racing	(Brazil) Rafael Câmara
2	R3	(Germany) Hockenheimring, Hockenheim	15 May		(Italy) Andrea Kimi Antonelli	(Italy) Andrea Kimi Antonelli	(Italy) Prema Racing	(Brazil) Rafael Câmara
3	R1	(Netherlands) Circuit Zandvoort, Zandvoort	25 June	(Italy) Andrea Kimi Antonelli	(Italy) Andrea Kimi Antonelli	(Italy) Andrea Kimi Antonelli	(Italy) Prema Racing	(Brazil) Rafael Câmara
3	R2	(Netherlands) Circuit Zandvoort, Zandvoort	26 June	(Italy) Andrea Kimi Antonelli	(Italy) Andrea Kimi Antonelli	(Italy) Andrea Kimi Antonelli	(Italy) Prema Racing	(Brazil) Rafael Câmara
3	R3	(Netherlands) Circuit Zandvoort, Zandvoort	26 June		(Australia) James Wharton	(Denmark) Conrad Laursen	(Italy) Prema Racing	(Brazil) Rafael Câmara
4	R1	(Germany) Nürburgring, Nürburg (Sprint Circuit)	6 August	(Italy) Andrea Kimi Antonelli	(Italy) Andrea Kimi Antonelli	(United Kingdom) Taylor Barnard	(Germany) PHM Racing	(Australia) James Wharton
4	R2	(Germany) Nürburgring, Nürburg (Sprint Circuit)	7 August	(United Kingdom) Taylor Barnard	(Italy) Andrea Kimi Antonelli	(United Kingdom) Taylor Barnard	(Germany) PHM Racing	(Australia) James Wharton
4	R3	(Germany) Nürburgring, Nürburg (Sprint Circuit)	7 August		(Australia) James Wharton	(Australia) James Wharton	(Italy) Prema Racing	(Australia) James Wharton
5	R1	(Germany) Lausitzring, Klettwitz (Sprint Circuit)	20 August	(United Kingdom) Taylor Barnard	(Italy) Nikita Bedrin	(Italy) Nikita Bedrin	(Germany) PHM Racing	(Finland) Rasmus Joutsimies
5	R2	(Germany) Lausitzring, Klettwitz (Sprint Circuit)	21 August	(United Kingdom) Taylor Barnard	(United Kingdom) Taylor Barnard	(United Kingdom) Taylor Barnard	(Germany) PHM Racing	(Germany) Valentin Kluss
5	R3	(Germany) Lausitzring, Klettwitz (Sprint Circuit)	21 August		(United Kingdom) Taylor Barnard	(United Kingdom) Taylor Barnard	(Germany) PHM Racing	(Germany) Valentin Kluss
6	R1	(Germany) Nürburgring, Nürburg (Grand Prix Circuit)	15 October	(Brazil) Rafael Câmara	(Brazil) Rafael Câmara	(Italy) Andrea Kimi Antonelli	(Italy) Prema Racing	(Brazil) Rafael Câmara
6	R2	(Germany) Nürburgring, Nürburg (Grand Prix Circuit)	15 October	(Brazil) Rafael Câmara	(United Kingdom) Taylor Barnard	(Italy) Andrea Kimi Antonelli	(Italy) Prema Racing	(Finland) Rasmus Joutsimies
6	R3	(Germany) Nürburgring, Nürburg (Grand Prix Circuit)	16 October		(Germany) Jonas Ried	(United Kingdom) Taylor Barnard	(Germany) PHM Racing	(Brazil) Rafael Câmara

== Championship standings ==
Points were awarded to the top 10 classified finishers (excluding guest drivers) in each race. No points were awarded for pole position or fastest lap. The final classifications for the individual championships were obtained by summing up the scores on the 16 best results obtained during the races held.

Position	**1st**	**2nd**	**3rd**	**4th**	**5th**	**6th**	**7th**	**8th**	**9th**	**10th**
Points	25	18	15	12	10	8	6	4	2	1

=== Drivers' Championship ===
Pos	Driver	SPA (Belgium)			HOC (Germany)			ZAN (Netherlands)			NÜR1 (Germany)			LAU (Germany)			NÜR2 (Germany)			Pts
Pos	Driver	R1	R2	R3	R1	R2	R3	R1	R2	R3	R1	R2	R3	R1	R2	R3	R1	R2	R3	Pts
1	(Italy) Andrea Kimi Antonelli	**1**	**1**	4	**1**	**1**	1	**1**	**1**	2	**2**	2	4				1	1	6	313
2	(United Kingdom) Taylor Barnard	6	6	15	3	4	3	6	6	4	1	**1**	3	**2**	**1**	1	4	2	1	266
3	(Brazil) Rafael Câmara	2	2	1	2	2	4	2	2	5							**2**	**10**	3	193
4	(Italy) Nikita Bedrin	8	5	8	Ret	3	Ret	4	5	7	3	3	8	1	3	2	9	9	5	175
5	(Australia) James Wharton	Ret	3	9	18	6	Ret	5	4	6	4	5	1				3	5	4	146
6	(Denmark) Conrad Laursen	4	Ret	3	7	8	9	3	7	1	5	6	2							129
7	(Austria) Charlie Wurz	3	Ret	5	4	10	6	7	3	3	6	4	7							111
8	(Finland) Rasmus Joutsimies	11	14	10	10	11	16	12	12	9	7	8	5	3	6	4	Ret	4	8	98
9	(Germany) Jonas Ried	9	7	Ret	6	9	5	Ret	14	13	10	Ret	9	7	5	7	Ret	7	11	71
10	(Poland) Kacper Sztuka	DNS	4	2										4	2	8				64
11	(Germany) Valentin Kluss							11	Ret	Ret	8	10	Ret	Ret	4	3	8	6	7	61
12	(France) Marcus Amand	5	8	6	DNS	7	2													48
13	(Switzerland) Michael Sauter	14	11	16	11	18	13	13	13	Ret	12	11	10	5	Ret	9	6	Ret	9	41
14	(Thailand) Nandhavud Bhirombhakdi	15	15	11				16	Ret	Ret	11	9	11	9	7	6	7	8	10	38
15	(Malta) Zachary David													6	8	5				22
16	(Singapore) Nikhil Bohra	7	Ret	12	12	Ret	14													10
17	(Italy) Alfio Spina	Ret	9	7	15	15	Ret													8
18	(Switzerland) Samir Ben				13	14	Ret	15	15	12	13	12	12	8	10	11				8
19	(China) Ruiqi Liu													10	9	10				4
20	(Germany) Chris Rosenkranz	17	Ret	17	16	19	Ret													0
–	(Singapore) Rishab Jain	WD	WD	WD																–
Guest drivers ineligible to score points
–	(United States) Ugo Ugochukwu										9	7	6				5	3	2	–
–	(Norway) Martinius Stenshorne				5	5	7	8	10	8										–
–	(United States) Arias Deukmedjian				8	Ret	15	14	9	Ret										–
–	(Brazil) Emerson Fittipaldi Jr.				14	13	12	10	8	10										–
–	(Ukraine) Oleksandr Partyshev				Ret	12	8													–
–	(Italy) Brando Badoer				9	17	10	18	16	11										–
–	(Netherlands) Maya Weug	16	Ret	18				9	11	Ret										–
–	(Costa Rica) Frederik Lund	12	10	19																–
–	(Portugal) Pedro Perino	10	Ret	14																–
–	(Belgium) Jules Castro				17	16	11	17	17	14										–
–	(Australia) Marcos Flack	Ret	12	13																–
–	(Switzerland) Ethan Ischer	13	13	20																–
Pos	Driver	R1	R2	R3	R1	R2	R3	R1	R2	R3	R1	R2	R3	R1	R2	R3	R1	R2	R3	Pts
Pos	Driver	SPA (Belgium)			HOC (Germany)			ZAN (Netherlands)			NÜR1 (Germany)			LAU (Germany)			NÜR2 (Germany)			Pts

Colour	Result
Gold	Winner
Silver	Second place
Bronze	Third place
Green	Points classification
Blue	Non-points classification
Blue	Non-classified finish (NC)
Purple	Retired, not classified (Ret)
Red	Did not qualify (DNQ)
Red	Did not pre-qualify (DNPQ)
Black	Disqualified (DSQ)
White	Did not start (DNS)
White	Withdrew (WD)
White	Race cancelled (C)
Blank	Did not practice (DNP)
Blank	Did not arrive (DNA)
Blank	Excluded (EX)

**Bold** – Pole
Italics – Fastest Lap
† — Did not finish but classified

=== Rookies' Championship ===
Pos	Driver	SPA (Belgium)			HOC (Germany)			ZAN (Netherlands)			NÜR1 (Germany)			LAU (Germany)			NÜR2 (Germany)			Pts
Pos	Driver	R1	R2	R3	R1	R2	R3	R1	R2	R3	R1	R2	R3	R1	R2	R3	R1	R2	R3	Pts
1	(Brazil) Rafael Câmara	2	2	1	2	2	4	2	2	5							2	10	3	285
2	(Finland) Rasmus Joutsimies	11	14	10	10	11	16	12	12	9	7	8	5	3	6	4	Ret	4	8	269
3	(Australia) James Wharton	Ret	3	9	18	6	Ret	5	4	6	4	5	1				3	5	4	242
4	(Thailand) Nandhavud Bhirombhakdi	15	15	11				16	Ret	Ret	11	9	11	9	7	6	8	8	10	163
5	(Germany) Valentin Kluss							11	Ret	Ret	8	10	Ret	Ret	4	3	9	6	7	134
6	(Singapore) Nikhil Bohra	7	Ret	12	12	Ret	14													59
7	(Italy) Alfio Spina	Ret	9	7	15	15	Ret													57
8	(Malta) Zachary David													6	8	5				45
9	(Germany) Chris Rosenkranz	17	Ret	17	17	19	Ret													36
10	(China) Ruiqi Liu													10	9	10				32
–	(Singapore) Rishab Jain	WD	WD	WD																–
Guest drivers ineligible to score points
–	(United States) Ugo Ugochukwu										9	7	6				5	3	2	–
–	(Norway) Martinius Stenshorne				5	5	7	8	10	8										–
–	(Italy) Brando Badoer				9	17	10	18	16	11										–
–	(Costa Rica) Frederik Lund	12	10	19																–
–	(Belgium) Jules Castro				17	16	11	17	17	14										–
–	(Switzerland) Ethan Ischer	13	13	20																–
Pos	Driver	R1	R2	R3	R1	R2	R3	R1	R2	R3	R1	R2	R3	R1	R2	R3	R1	R2	R3	Pts
Pos	Driver	SPA (Belgium)			HOC (Germany)			ZAN (Netherlands)			NÜR1 (Germany)			LAU (Germany)			NÜR2 (Germany)			Pts

=== Teams' Cup ===
Only two best team's drivers in each race were eligible to score points. The other drivers were omitted during rewarding the points.

Pos	Driver	SPA (Belgium)			HOC (Germany)			ZAN (Netherlands)			NÜR1 (Germany)			LAU (Germany)			NÜR2 (Germany)			Pts
Pos	Driver	R1	R2	R3	R1	R2	R3	R1	R2	R3	R1	R2	R3	R1	R2	R3	R1	R2	R3	Pts
1	(Italy) Prema Racing	1	1	1	1	1	1	1	1	1	2	2	1				1	1	3	594
1	(Italy) Prema Racing	2	2	3	2	2	4	2	2	2	4	4	2				2	5	4	594
2	(Germany) PHM Racing	6	5	8	3	3	3	4	5	4	1	1	3	1	1	1	4	2	1	531
2	(Germany) PHM Racing	8	6	15	6	4	5	6	6	7	3	3	8	2	3	2	8	6	5	531
3	(Switzerland) Jenzer Motorsport	11	13	10	10	11	16	12	12	9	7	8	5	3	6	4	7	4	8	276
3	(Switzerland) Jenzer Motorsport	13	14	11	13	14	Ret	15	15	12	11	9	11	8	7	6	Ret	8	10	276
4	(Germany) US Racing	5	4	2	12	7	2							4	2	5				184
4	(Germany) US Racing	7	8	6	Ret	Ret	14							6	8	8				184
5	(Switzerland) Sauter Engineering + Design	14	11	16	11	18	13	13	13	Ret	12	11	10	5	Ret	9	6	Ret	9	97
6	(Germany) BWR Motorsports	17	9	7	15	15	Ret													25
6	(Germany) BWR Motorsports	Ret	Ret	17	17	19	Ret													25
Pos	Driver	R1	R2	R3	R1	R2	R3	R1	R2	R3	R1	R2	R3	R1	R2	R3	R1	R2	R3	Pts
Pos	Driver	SPA (Belgium)			HOC (Germany)			ZAN (Netherlands)			NÜR1 (Germany)			LAU (Germany)			NÜR2 (Germany)			Pts

Colour	Result
Gold	Winner
Silver	Second place
Bronze	Third place
Green	Points classification
Blue	Non-points classification
Blue	Non-classified finish (NC)
Purple	Retired, not classified (Ret)
Red	Did not qualify (DNQ)
Red	Did not pre-qualify (DNPQ)
Black	Disqualified (DSQ)
White	Did not start (DNS)
White	Withdrew (WD)
White	Race cancelled (C)
Blank	Did not practice (DNP)
Blank	Did not arrive (DNA)
Blank	Excluded (EX)

† — Did not finish but classified
