= Pedro Perino =

Portuguese racing driver (born 2005)

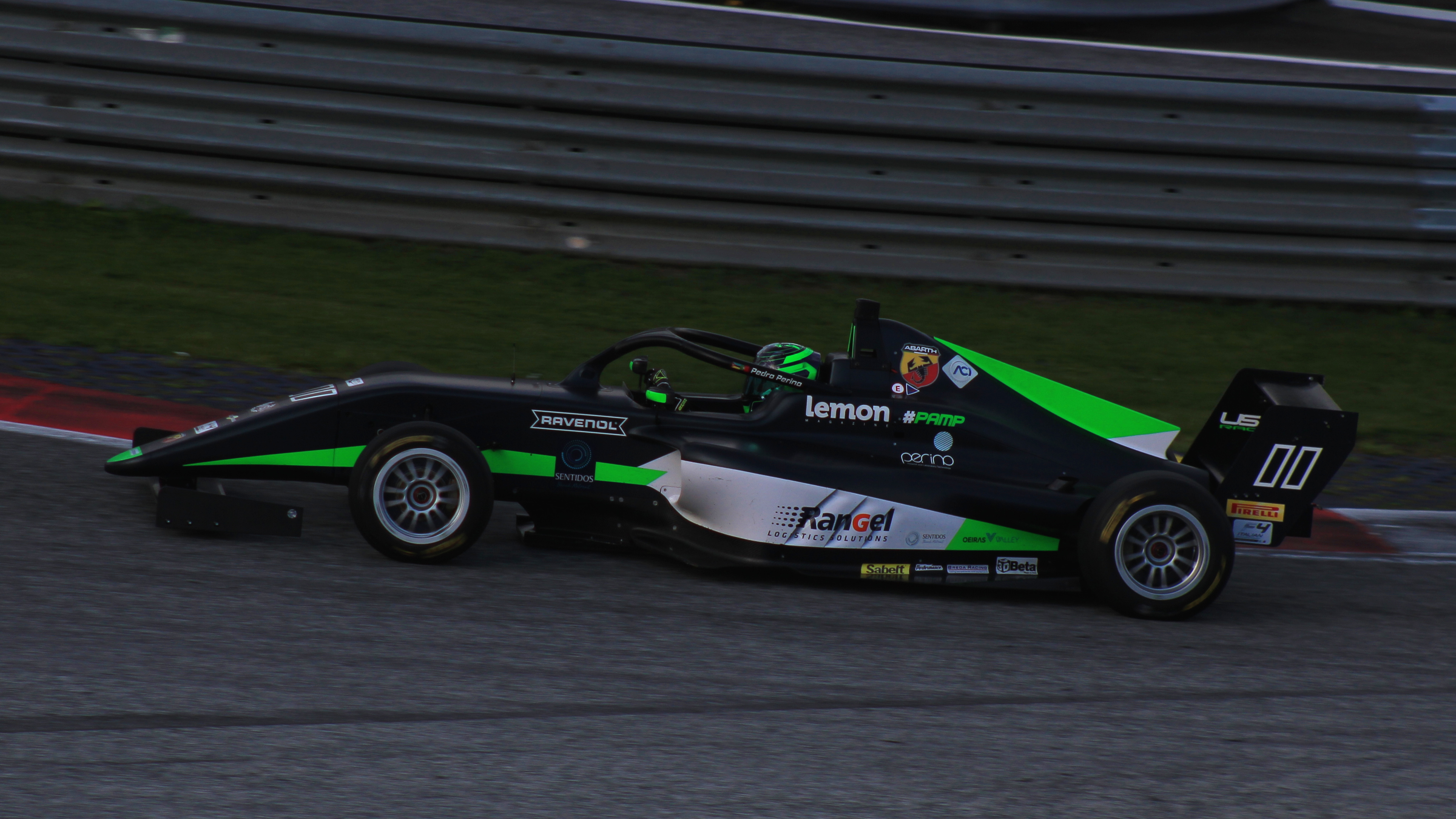
- Perino in 2022
- Nationality: (Mozambique) Mozambican (Portugal) Portuguese (Note: Perino competed under a Portuguese racing licence earlier in his career. He currently represents Mozambique.)
- Born: Pedro Alexandre Martins Perino; 27 May 2005 (age 21) Maputo, Mozambique

European Le Mans Series career
- Debut season: 2023
- Current team: Inter Europol Competition
- Categorisation: FIA Silver
- Car number: 34
- Starts: 17
- Wins: 0
- Podiums: 3
- Poles: 0
- Fastest laps: 0
- Best finish: 3rd (LMP3) in 2024

Previous series
- 2022 2020-2022: ADAC Formula 4 Italian F4 Championship

Pedro Alexandre Martins Perino (born 27 May 2005) is a Portuguese-Mozambican racing driver who is competing for Speedy Motorsport in the GT4 European Series.

== Early career ==
Having tested Formula 4 machinery in Cremona at the back end of 2020, Perino would make his car racing debut, driving for DR Formula RP Motorsport in the final round of the Italian F4 Championship. Perino completed further F4 tests in December in preparation for a full assault of the Italian series. That year, he also competed in karting, driving for KR Motorsport in the OK category of the European and World championships.

The following season, Perino remained with DR Formula to race in Italian F4 on a full-time basis. However, a disappointing first half of the season led to a switch to the race-winning US Racing outfit, with whom Perino would score a best finish of tenth at the Red Bull Ring.

Perino returned to US Racing for the 2022 season, where he partnered Alex Dunne, Kacper Sztuka, Nikhil Bohra and Marcus Amand. One points finish, a sixth place during Race 1 in Monza, was all Perino could muster up, becoming the first African driver ever to score points, and which also left him 19th in the standings out of the mega 55 drivers grid.

== Sportscar career ==
For 2023, Perino joined DKR Engineering in the LMP3 class of the European Le Mans Series for his first venture into endurance racing. With two podiums at the end of the year, Perino and his teammates — experienced prototype competitor James Winslow and bronze-ranked Alexander Bukhantsov — ended up sixth in the standings.

For 2024, Perino and Bukhantsov moved to Inter Europol Competition in order to partner Kai Askey.

== Karting record ==
=== Karting career summary ===
Season	Series	Team	Position
2019	IAME Winter Cup — X30 Junior	Monlau Competición Spain	NC
2019	Campeonato de Portugal de Karting — Junior		7th
2019	CIK-FIA Academy Trophy	Perino, João	47th
2020	IAME Winter Cup — X30 Senior	Cabo Junior Team	NC
2020	Campeonato de Portugal de Karting — X30	Cabo Junior Team	12th
2020	WSK Euro Series — OK	KR Motorsport Srl	52nd
2020	Champions of the Future — OK	KR Motorsport Srl	NC
2020	CIK-FIA European Championship — OK	KR Motorsport Srl	42nd
2020	CIK-FIA World Championship — OK	KR Motorsport Srl	55th

== Racing record ==
=== Racing career summary ===
Season	Series	Team	Races	Wins	Poles	F/Laps	Podiums	Points	Position
2020	Italian F4 Championship	DR Formula RP Motorsport	2	0	0	0	0	0	44th
2021	Italian F4 Championship	DR Formula RP Motorsport	12	0	0	0	0	1	33rd
2021	Italian F4 Championship	US Racing	9	0	0	0	0	1	33rd
2022	Italian F4 Championship	US Racing	20	0	0	0	0	8	19th
2022	ADAC Formula 4 Championship	US Racing	3	0	0	0	0	0	NC†
2023	European Le Mans Series - LMP3	DKR Engineering	6	0	0	0	2	51	6th
2023	Prototype Cup Germany	DKR Engineering	2	0	0	0	0	0	NC†
2023	Ultimate Cup Series - Proto P3	TS Corse	1	0	0	0	0	24	15th
2024	European Le Mans Series - LMP3	Inter Europol Competition	6	0	0	0	1	10	20th
2024	Prototype Winter Series - Class 3	Inter Europol Competition	1	0	1	0	1	7.86	13th
2024	Ultimate Cup Series - Proto P3	Inter Europol Competition	5	2	2	1	4	95	3rd
2025	European Le Mans Series - LMP2	Inter Europol Competition	6	0	0	0	0	23	12th
2026	GT4 European Series - Silver	Speedy Motorsport							

^{†} As Perino was a guest driver, he was ineligible to score points.
* Season still in progress.

=== Complete Italian F4 Championship results ===
(key) (Races in bold indicate pole position) (Races in italics indicate fastest lap)

Year	Team	1	2	3	4	5	6	7	8	9	10	11	12	13	14	15	16	17	18	19	20	21	22	DC	Points
2020	DR Formula RP Motorsport	MIS; 1	MIS; 2	MIS; 3	IMO1; 1	IMO1; 2	IMO1; 3	RBR; 1	RBR; 2	RBR; 3	MUG; 1	MUG; 2	MUG; 3	MNZ; 1	MNZ; 2	MNZ; 3	IMO2; 1	IMO2; 2	IMO2; 3	VLL; 1; 28	VLL; 2 C	VLL; 3; 31		44th	0
2021	DR Formula RP Motorsport	LEC; 1; 36†	LEC; 2; 23	LEC; 3; 25	MIS; 1; 27	MIS; 2; 24	MIS; 3; 25	VLL; 1; 27	VLL; 2; 13	VLL; 3 Ret	IMO; 1; 23	IMO; 2; 18	IMO; 3; 27†											33rd	1
2021	US Racing													RBR; 1 Ret	RBR; 2; 19	RBR; 3; 10	MUG; 1; 21	MUG; 2; 16	MUG; 3; 24	MNZ; 1; 15	MNZ; 2; 15	MNZ; 3; 15		33rd	1
2022	US Racing	IMO; 1 Ret	IMO; 2; 18	IMO; 3; 12	MIS; 1 Ret	MIS; 2; 21	MIS; 3; 19	SPA; 1; 17	SPA; 2; 21	SPA; 3; 16	VLL; 1; 14	VLL; 2; 13	VLL; 3; 33†	RBR; 1; 13	RBR; 2; 25†	RBR; 3	RBR; 4; 27	MNZ; 1; 6	MNZ; 2; 16	MNZ; 3 C	MUG; 1 Ret	MUG; 2; 27	MUG; 3; 18	19th	8

=== Complete European Le Mans Series results ===
(key) (Races in bold indicate pole position; results in italics indicate fastest lap)

Year	Entrant	Class	Chassis	Engine	1	2	3	4	5	6	Rank	Points
2023	DKR Engineering	LMP3	Duqueine M30 - D08	Nissan VK56DE 5.6L V8	CAT; 10	LEC; 5	ARA; 8	SPA; 7	PRT; 3	ALG; 3	6th	51
2024	Inter Europol Competition	LMP3	Ligier JS P320	Nissan VK56DE 5.6L V8	CAT; 6	LEC; Ret	IMO; 9 (Note: Perino did not fulfil his mandated minimum drive time at the 2024 4 Hours of Imola and the 2024 4 Hours of Mugello, meaning that he did not receive points for those events.)	SPA; 9	MUG; 3	ALG; Ret	20th	10
2025	Inter Europol Competition	LMP2	Oreca 07	Gibson GK428 4.2 L V8	CAT; 9	LEC; 10	IMO; 6	SPA; 5	SIL; 9	ALG; Ret	12th	23

^{*} Season still in progress.

=== Complete Ultimate Cup Series results ===
(key) (Races in bold indicate pole position; results in italics indicate fastest lap)

Year	Entrant	Class	Chassis	1	2	3	4	5	6	Rank	Points
2023	TS Corse	LMP3	Duqueine M30 - D08	LEC1	NAV	HOC	EST; 11	MAG	LEC2	15th	24
2024	Inter Europol Competition	LMP3	Ligier JS P320	LEC1; 4	ALG; 10	HOC	**MUG**; 9	**MAG**; 7	LEC2; 3	3rd	95

^{*} Season still in progress.
