= Victoria Blokhina =

Russian racing driver (born 2006)

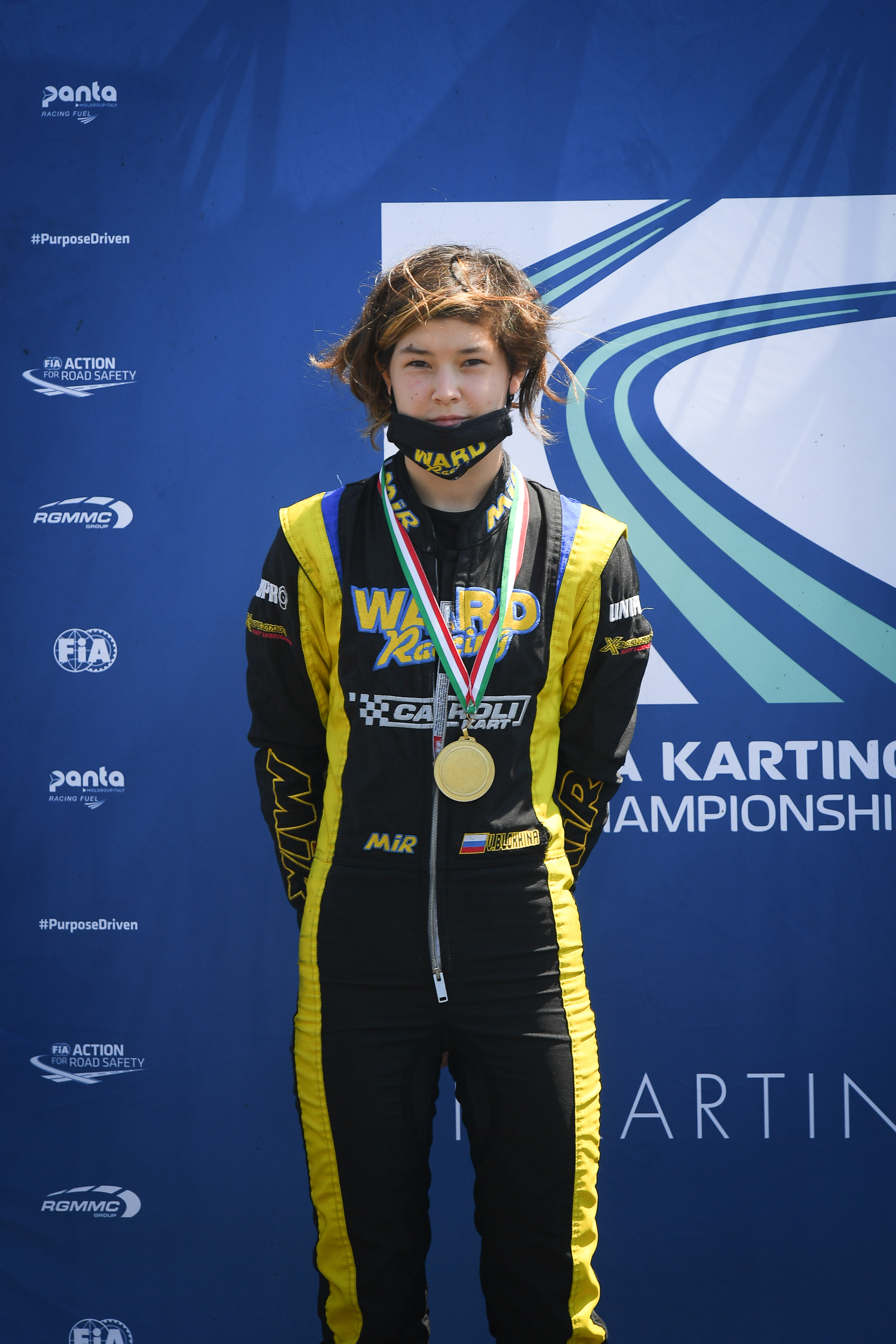
- Blokhina in 2021
- Nationality: Russian (Note: Blokhina has competed under Russian and Kyrgyz racing licences.)
- Born: Victoria Eduardovna Blokhina; 4 November 2006 (age 20) Moscow, Russia
- Debut season: 2024
- Starts: 93
- Wins: 0
- Podiums: 0
- Poles: 0
- Fastest laps: 0
- Best finish: 12th in 2024

Previous series
- 2024–25 2022–23 2022–23: Eurocup-3; Italian F4 Championship; Formula 4 UAE Championship

Victoria Eduardovna Blokhina (Russian: Виктория Эдуардовна Блохина; born 4 November 2006) is a Russian racing driver who last competed in the 2025 Eurocup-3 SWC with Drivex.

== Career ==
=== Karting ===
Blokhina was in junior karting in 2019 and 2020, securing a best result of 39th in the WSK Open Cup. She stepped up to senior karting for one year in 2021 and she secured some decent results, including an eighth-placed finish in the Italian ACI Karting Championship.

=== Formula 4 ===
==== 2022 ====
Blokhina signed up for the 2022 Formula 4 UAE Championship for her maiden year in car-racing, joining the 3Y by R-ace GP team. Her spell in the series yielded a best finish of 19th, achieved in the first round of the season, on her way to 37th in the championship standings. She then moved over to the 2022 Italian F4 Championship to compete for PHM Racing. Blokhina finished 34th in the standings, securing a best finish of 12th at the Red Bull Ring. She ended the year in the Formula 4 UAE Trophy Round, where she finished 6th in the second race.

==== 2023 ====
Blokhina competed for R2Race Cavicel in the 2023 Formula 4 UAE Championship. She achieved a best result of 22nd, finishing 44th in the standings. She returned to the Italian F4 Championship with PHM, scoring two 15th-placed finishes to end the year 35th in the standings.

=== Eurocup-3 ===
==== 2024 ====
In early 2024, Blokhina joined Drivex for the 2024 Eurocup-3 season. She contested the full 15-race season, with her development peaking at the penultimate round in Barcelona, where she finished a season-best 12th in the opening race. She finished the season 27th in the championship with no points.

==== 2025 ====
At the end of 2024, Blokhina was confirmed to be returning to Drivex for her second Eurocup-3 campaign in 2025. She participated in the first round of the Eurocup-3 Spanish Winter Championship at Jerez, with a best finish of 20th. Although she was initially entered into the second round at Portimão, she withdrew before the races. Ultimately, Blokhina did not enter any rounds of the main 2025 Eurocup-3 season.

== Karting record ==
=== Karting career summary ===
Season	Series	Team	Position
2019	48° Trofeo delle Industrie - OKJ	Team Komarov	NC
2019	WSK Open Cup - OKJ	Team Komarov	39th
2019	WSK Final Cup - OKJ	Team Komarov	NC
2020	WSK Super Master Series - OKJ	Team Komarov	55th
2020	25° South Garda Winter Cup - OKJ	Team Komarov	NC
2020	WSK Open Cup - OK	Ward Racing	15th
2021	WSK Champions Cup - OK	Ward Racing	29th
2021	WSK Super Master Series - OK	Ward Racing	39th
2021	WSK Euro Series - OK	Ward Racing	52nd
2021	CIK-FIA European Championship - OK	Ward Racing	44th
2021	Italian ACI Championship - OK		8th

== Racing record ==
=== Racing career summary ===
Season	Series	Team	Races	Wins	Poles	F/Laps	Podiums	Points	Position
2022	Formula 4 UAE Championship	3Y by R-ace GP	16	0	0	0	0	0	37th
2022	Italian F4 Championship	PHM Racing	20	0	0	0	0	0	34th
2022	F4 Spanish Championship	Drivex School	3	0	0	0	0	0	NC†
2022	Formula 4 UAE Championship - Trophy Round	Xcel Motorsport	2	0	0	0	0	N/A	NC
2023	Formula 4 UAE Championship	R2Race Cavicel	15	0	0	0	0	0	44th
2023	Italian F4 Championship	PHM Racing	19	0	0	0	0	0	35th
2024	Eurocup-3	Drivex	15	0	0	0	0	0	27th
2025	Eurocup-3 Spanish Winter Championship	Drivex	3	0	0	0	0	0	30th

=== Complete Formula 4 UAE Championship results ===
(key) (Races in bold indicate pole position) (Races in italics indicate fastest lap)

Year	Team	1	2	3	4	5	6	7	8	9	10	11	12	13	14	15	16	17	18	19	20	DC	Points
2022	3Y by R-ace GP	YMC1; 1; 21	YMC1; 2; 19	YMC1; 3; 22	YMC1; 4; 21	DUB1; 1; 23	DUB1; 2; 22	DUB1; 3; 22	DUB1; 4; 23	DUB2; 1; 23	DUB2; 2; 21	DUB2; 3; 28	DUB2; 4 Ret	DUB3; 1; 23	DUB3; 2; 24	DUB3; 3; 26	DUB3; 4; 25	YMC2; 1	YMC2; 2	YMC2; 3	YMC2; 4	37th	0
2023	R2Race Cavicel	DUB1; 1; 30	DUB1; 2; 30	DUB1; 3; 25	KMT1; 1; 28	KMT1; 2; 27	KMT1; 3; 26	KMT2; 1; 30	KMT2; 2; 28	KMT2; 3; 27	DUB2; 1; 25	DUB2; 2; 23	DUB2; 3; 27	YMC; 1; 22	YMC; 2; 22	YMC; 3; 28						44th	0

=== Complete Italian F4 Championship results ===
(key) (Races in bold indicate pole position) (Races in italics indicate fastest lap)

Year	Team	1	2	3	4	5	6	7	8	9	10	11	12	13	14	15	16	17	18	19	20	21	22	DC	Points
2022	PHM Racing	IMO; 1; 17	IMO; 2; 30	IMO; 3; 31†	MIS; 1; 17	MIS; 2; 23	MIS; 3; 30	SPA; 1; 27	SPA; 2; 25	SPA; 3; 25	VLL; 1; 24	VLL; 2; 17	VLL; 3; 17	RBR; 1; 12	RBR; 2	RBR; 3; 15	RBR; 4; 29	MNZ; 1; 24	MNZ; 2; 21	MNZ; 3 C	MUG; 1; 30†	MUG; 2; 28	MUG; 3; 25	34th	0
2023	PHM Racing	IMO; 1; 22	IMO; 2; 15	IMO; 3	IMO; 4; 19	MIS; 1; 15	MIS; 2; 21	MIS; 3; 26	SPA; 1 Ret	SPA; 2 WD	SPA; 3 WD	MNZ; 1; 24	MNZ; 2; 20	MNZ; 3; 21	LEC; 1; 25	LEC; 2; 22	LEC; 3; 22	MUG; 1; 25	MUG; 2; 28	MUG; 3; 23	VLL; 1; 28	VLL; 2; 20	VLL; 3; 30	35th	0

=== Complete Eurocup-3 results ===
(key) (Races in bold indicate pole position) (Races in italics indicate fastest lap)

Year	Team	1	2	3	4	5	6	7	8	9	10	11	12	13	14	15	16	17	DC	Points
2024	Drivex	SPA; 1; 17	SPA; 2 C	RBR; 1; 17	RBR; 2; 18	POR; 1; 16	POR; 2 Ret	POR; 3 DNS	LEC; 1; 18	LEC; 2; 18	ZAN; 1; 18	ZAN; 2; 25	ARA; 1; 20	ARA; 2; 16	JER; 1; 22	JER; 2; 20	CAT; 1; 12	CAT; 2; 16	27th	0

=== Complete Eurocup-3 Spanish Winter Championship results ===
(key) (Races in bold indicate pole position) (Races in italics indicate fastest lap)

Year	Team	1	2	3	4	5	6	7	8	DC	Points
2025	Drivex	JER; 1; 20	JER; 2; 21	JER; 3; 21	POR; 1 WD	POR; 2 WD	POR; 3 WD	ARA; 1	ARA; 2	30th	0
