= Oleh Blokhin (footballer, born 1980) =

Ukrainian professional football player

Personal information
- Full name: Oleh Olegovych Blokhin
- Date of birth: 20 October 1980 (age 46)
- Height: 1.83 m (6 ft 0 in)
- Position: Defender

Team information
- Current team: FS "Galaxy" Tolyatti

Senior career*
Years	Team	Apps	(Gls)
1997–1998	FC Kremin Kremenchuk	17	(0)
1999	FC Vorskla-2 Poltava	10	(0)
1999–2001	FC Adoms Kremenchuk	36	(1)
2001	FC Lada Togliatti	14	(0)
2002	FC Sodovik Sterlitamak	8	(1)
2003	FC Esil Kokshetau	10	(0)
2003–2004	FC Spartak-Horobyna Sumy	27	(2)
2005–2006	FC Dnipro Cherkasy	9	(1)
2006	FC Nistru Otaci	9	(0)
2006	FC Ihroservice Simferopol	1	(0)
2007	PFC Oleksandria	15	(0)
2008	FC Lada Togliatti	7	(0)
2008	FC Sokol-Saratov	17	(1)
2009	FC Stroitel Penza (D4)		
2009	FC Bashinformsvyaz-Dynamo Ufa	8	(1)
2010	FC Dynamo Stavropol	10	(1)
2011–2012	FC Syzran-2003 Syzran	9	(0)

Managerial career
- 2015–: FS "Galaxy" Tolyatti
- * Club domestic league appearances and goals as of 08:57, 13 June 2012 (UTC)

Oleh Olehovych Blokhin (Russian: Олег Олегович Блохин; born 20 October 1980) is a Ukrainian professional football player. He last played in the Russian Second Division for FC Syzran-2003 Syzran. He also holds Ukrainian citizenship.
