= Ufimtsev =

Ufimtsev/Ufimtseva is a Russian surname. Notable people with the surname include:

- Anatoly Ufimtsev (1880–1936), Russian engineer
- Anatoly Ufimtsev (chess player) (1914–2000), Kazakh chess player
- Irina Ufimtseva (born 1985), Russian Olympics freestyle swimmer
- Pyotr Ufimtsev (born 1931), Soviet/Russian physicist
