= Anna Anichkova =

Russian writer and translator (1868–1935)

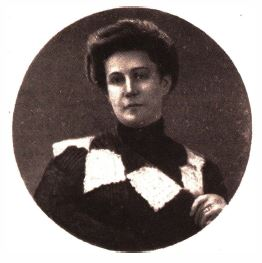
- Born: 1868/1869; Caucasus
- Died: 1935
- Occupations: Writer and translator

Anna Mitrofanovna Anichkova (1868/1869 – 1935) was a Russian writer and translator who published under the pseudonym Ivan Strannik. She wrote fiction in both French and Russian.

== Life ==
Anna Mitrofanovna Avinova was born in the Caucasus. Some sources give 1868 as her year of birth, and others 1869. She married the literary critic Evgeny Anichkov and moved to Paris in the late 1890s, establishing a literary salon there which attracted writers like Anatole France and Vlacheslav Ivanov. She wrote novels in French, and contributed to Revue de Paris, Revue Bleu and Figaro.

In 1909 the couple returned to Russia, and she began writing short fiction for the 'thick periodicals' there. After the Russian Revolution in 1917 she concentrated on translation rather than fiction.

== Works ==
=== Novels ===
- ИНГИЛЬДА: ИСТОРИЧЕСКИЙ РОМАН ТРИНАДЦАТАГО СТОЛ'ЬТШ [Ringil'da: A historical novel of the thirteenth century] (in Russian). 1900.
- L'appel de l'eau [The Call of Water] (in French). Paris: Société du Mercure de France. 1902.
- La statue ensevelie [The Buried Statue] (in French). Paris: Calmann-Lévy. 1902.
- L'ombre de la maison [The Shadow of the House] (in French). Paris: Calmann-Lévy. 1904.
- Les nuages [The Clouds] (in French). Paris: Calmann-Lévy. 1905.

=== Others ===
- (trans.) Maxim Gorky. Les Vagabonds. Paris: Mercure de France.
- (trans.) Maxim Gorky (1902). Twenty-six and one: and other stories from the Vagabond series. New York: J.F. Taylor & Co.
- La pensée russe contemporaine [Contemporary Russian Thought] (in French). Paris: A. Colin. 1903.
- Les mages sans étoile: ames russes [Magi without a star: Russian souls] (in French). Paris: Calmann-Lévy. 1906.
