= 2025 Silverstone Formula 3 round =

Motor racing event

(United Kingdom) 2025 Silverstone Formula 3 round
Round details
- Round 7 of 10 in the 2025 FIA Formula 3 Championship.
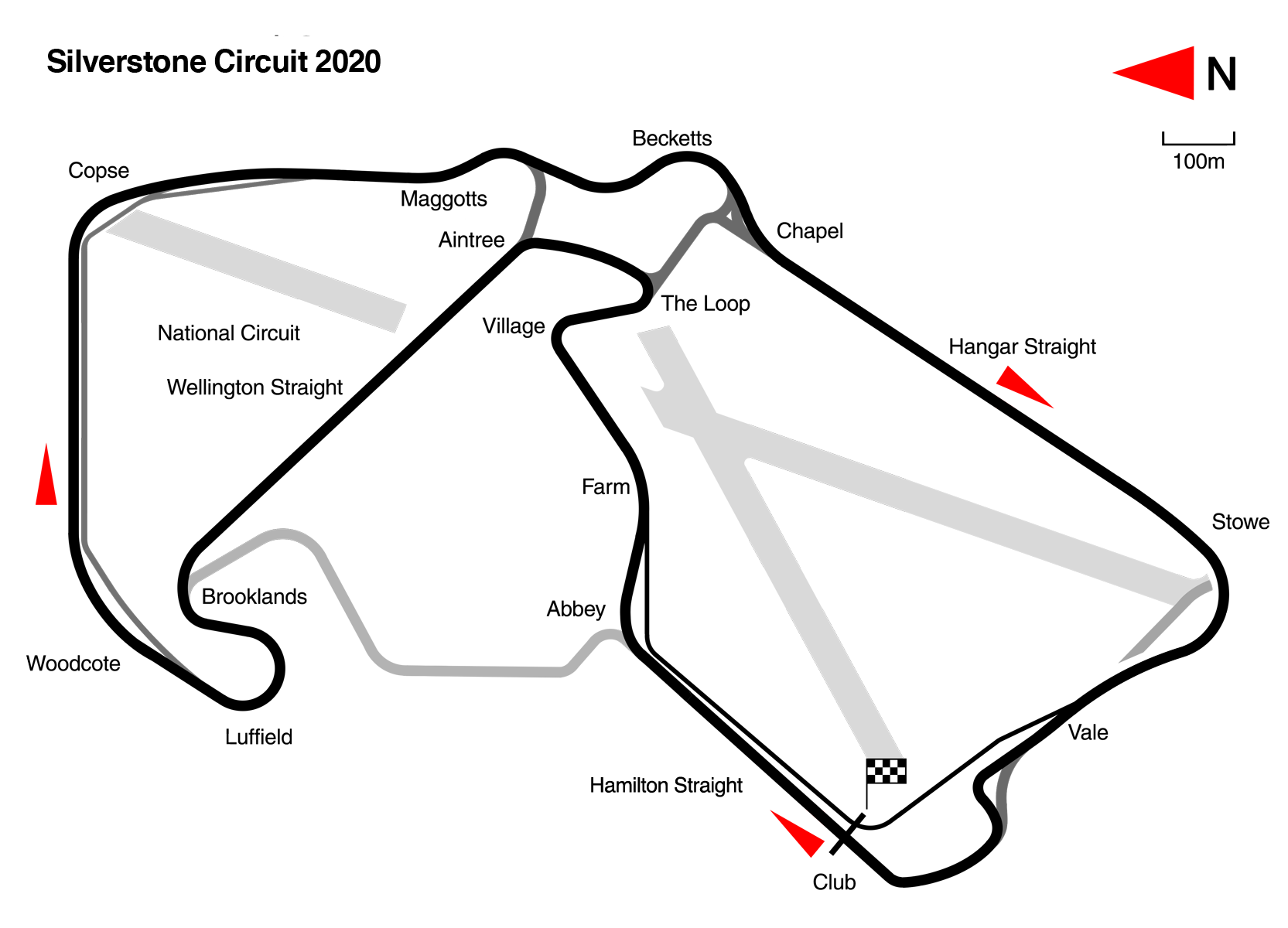
- Layout of Silverstone Circuit
- Location: Silverstone Circuit; Silverstone, United Kingdom
- Course: Permanent racing facility 5.891 km (3.660 mi)

Sprint Race
- Date: 5 July 2025
- Laps: 18
Podium
First	(Thailand) Tasanapol Inthraphuvasak	Campos Racing
Second	(Norway) Martinius Stenshorne	Hitech TGR
Third	(Spain) Mari Boya	Campos Racing
Fastest lap
Driver	(France) Théophile Naël	Van Amersfoort Racing
- Time: 1:47.541 (on lap 6)

Feature Race
- Date: 6 July 2025
- Laps: 12 (22 scheduled)
Pole position
Driver	(Bulgaria) Nikola Tsolov	Campos Racing
Time	1:45.043	
Podium
First	(Spain) Mari Boya	Campos Racing
Second	(France) Théophile Naël	Van Amersfoort Racing
Third	(Mexico) Noel León	Prema Racing
Fastest lap
Driver	(Netherlands) Laurens van Hoepen	ART Grand Prix
- Time: 2:03.052 (on lap 8)

The 2025 Silverstone FIA Formula 3 round was a motor racing event held between 4 and 6 July 2025 at Silverstone Circuit. It was the seventh round of the 2025 FIA Formula 3 Championship and was held in support of the 2025 British Grand Prix.

Two changes were made to the grid ahead of the race. Nicola Lacorte returned following his race ban, and Nikita Johnson moved to Hitech TGR to replace Jesse Carrasquedo Jr., who prioritised his Eurocup-3 season.

Nikola Tsolov took his second pole position in a row in qualifying, with Tasanapol Inthraphuvasak claiming reverse-grid sprint pole. Inthraphuvasak held the lead at the start of the race, with Théophile Naël making his way from fourth to second. Tsolov was hit by Brando Badoer on the opening lap, with Badoer stopping on track, triggering a safety car. Martinius Stenshorne overtook Christian Ho for third on the restart. On lap 7, Naël attempted to pass Inthraphuvasak for the lead, but went off-track while doing so, and was told to give the position back four laps later. Naël was then passed by Stenshorne on lap 13, and fell further back to be attacked by Laurens van Hoepen soon after. However, the pair ran wide, and Mari Boya overtook them both to claim third place. It was Inthraphuvasak's first win in Formula 3, and the first for a Thai driver in the series.

The feature race began on a damp track, with the field split between slick and wet tyres. Boya, the leading driver on wet tyres, jumped from fourth to first at the start, followed by Naël and Noel León, while those on slick tyres fell to the rear of the field, led by Tsolov in 20th. The top three remained consistent throughout the race, followed by Roman Biliński, who had made his way from 17th to fourth in the opening laps. The rain intensified, and Louis Sharp ran off into the gravel at Club, prompting a safety car before the race was red flagged on lap 14 and not restarted. Boya took his first win of the season, and Câmara retained the championship lead, with challenges Tramnitz and Tsolov failing to score during the weekend.

== Classification ==
=== Qualifying ===
Qualifying was held on 4 July 2025, at 13:15 local time (UTC+1).

Pos.	No.	Driver	Entrant	Time/Gap	Grid SR	Grid FR
1	12	(Bulgaria) Nikola Tsolov	Campos Racing	1:45.043	12	1
2	3	(United States) Ugo Ugochukwu	Prema Racing	+0.023	11	2
3	5	(Brazil) Rafael Câmara	Trident	+0.133	10	3
4	10	(Spain) Mari Boya	Campos Racing	+0.308	9	4
5	17	(Germany) Tim Tramnitz	MP Motorsport	+0.429	8	5
6	6	(Austria) Charlie Wurz	Trident	+0.437	7	6
7	14	(Norway) Martinius Stenshorne	Hitech TGR	+0.445	6	7
8	7	(Netherlands) Laurens van Hoepen	ART Grand Prix	+0.453	5	8
9	20	(France) Théophile Naël	Van Amersfoort Racing	+0.479	4	9
10	2	(Mexico) Noel León	Prema Racing	+0.497	3	10
11	31	(Singapore) Christian Ho	DAMS Lucas Oil	+0.539	2	11
12	11	(Thailand) Tasanapol Inthraphuvasak	Campos Racing	+0.541	1	12
13	28	(United States) Brad Benavides	AIX Racing	+0.583	13	13
14	19	(France) Alessandro Giusti	MP Motorsport	+0.643	17^{1}	17^{1}
15	4	(Denmark) Noah Strømsted	Trident	+0.652	14	14
16	1	(Italy) Brando Badoer	Prema Racing	+0.683	15	19^{2}
17	25	(Poland) Roman Bilinski	Rodin Motorsport	+0.737	16	15
18	21	(Mexico) Santiago Ramos	Van Amersfoort Racing	+0.742	18	16
19	8	(Finland) Tuukka Taponen	ART Grand Prix	+0.882	19	18
20	9	(Australia) James Wharton	ART Grand Prix	+0.947	20	20
21	22	(Portugal) Ivan Domingues	Van Amersfoort Racing	+0.949	21	21
22	18	(Spain) Bruno del Pino	MP Motorsport	+0.974	22	22
23	24	(New Zealand) Louis Sharp	Rodin Motorsport	+0.977	23	23
24	30	(Peru) Matías Zagazeta	DAMS Lucas Oil	+1.017	24	24
25	23	(United Kingdom) Callum Voisin	Rodin Motorsport	+1.118	25	25
26	15	(United States) Nikita Johnson	Hitech TGR	+1.415	26	26
27	29	(Italy) Nicola Lacorte	DAMS Lucas Oil	+1.481	27	27
28	16	(China) Gerrard Xie	Hitech TGR	+1.761	28	28
29	27	(Italy) Nicola Marinangeli	AIX Racing	+1.879	29	29
30	26	(United Kingdom) James Hedley	AIX Racing	+2.060	30	30

Notes:

- ^1 Alessandro Giusti was given a three-place grid penalty for both races for impeding another driver during qualifying.
- ^2 Brando Badoer was given a three-place grid penalty for the feature race for causing a collision in the sprint race.

=== Sprint race ===
The sprint race was held on 5 July 2025, at 09:15 local time (UTC+1).

Pos.	No.	Driver	Team	Laps	Time/Gap	Grid	Pts.
1	11	(Thailand) Tasanapol Inthraphuvasak	Campos Racing	18	35:18.467	1	10+1
2	14	(Norway) Martinius Stenshorne	Hitech TGR	18	+1.748	6	9
3	10	(Spain) Mari Boya	Campos Racing	18	+6.466	9	8
4	7	(Netherlands) Laurens van Hoepen	ART Grand Prix	18	+8.856	5	7
5	3	(United States) Ugo Ugochukwu	Prema Racing	18	+9.365	11	6
6	31	(Singapore) Christian Ho	DAMS Lucas Oil	18	+11.291	2	5
7	2	(Mexico) Noel León	Prema Racing	18	+12.083	3	4
8	5	(Brazil) Rafael Câmara	Trident	18	+12.757	10	3
9	6	(Austria) Charlie Wurz	Trident	18	+15.354	7	2
10	25	(Poland) Roman Bilinski	Rodin Motorsport	18	+16.767	16	1
11	17	(Germany) Tim Tramnitz	MP Motorsport	18	+17.369	8	
12	19	(France) Alessandro Giusti	MP Motorsport	18	+19.012	17	
13	4	(Denmark) Noah Strømsted	Trident	18	+20.458	14	
14	28	(United States) Brad Benavides	AIX Racing	18	+21.090	13	
15	21	(Mexico) Santiago Ramos	Van Amersfoort Racing	18	+21.449	18	
16	9	(Australia) James Wharton	ART Grand Prix	18	+22.072	20	
17	22	(Portugal) Ivan Domingues	Van Amersfoort Racing	18	+22.443	21	
18	8	(Finland) Tuukka Taponen	ART Grand Prix	18	+22.795	19	
19	20	(France) Théophile Naël	Van Amersfoort Racing	18	+23.108^{1}	4	
20	18	(Spain) Bruno del Pino	MP Motorsport	18	+26.438	22	
21	24	(New Zealand) Louis Sharp	Rodin Motorsport	18	+28.237	23	
22	23	(United Kingdom) Callum Voisin	Rodin Motorsport	18	+29.486	25	
23	29	(Italy) Nicola Lacorte	DAMS Lucas Oil	18	+30.069	27	
24	16	(China) Gerrard Xie	Hitech TGR	18	+30.735	28	
25	30	(Peru) Matías Zagazeta	DAMS Lucas Oil	18	+31.715	24	
26	26	(United Kingdom) James Hedley	AIX Racing	18	+32.180	30	
27	15	(United States) Nikita Johnson	Hitech TGR	18	+32.703	26	
28	27	(Italy) Nicola Marinangeli	AIX Racing	18	+35.137	29	
29	12	(Bulgaria) Nikola Tsolov	Campos Racing	18	+37.697	12	
DNF	1	(Italy) Brando Badoer	Prema Racing	0	Collision	15	
Fastest lap: (France) Théophile Naël (1:47.541 on lap 6)^{2}

Notes:

- ^1 Théophile Naël was given a combined fifteen-second time penalty for two instances of leaving the track and gaining an advantage. This demoted him from 4th to 19th.
- ^2 Théophile Naël set the fastest lap but did not finish in the top ten, so he was ineligible to score the point for it. Tasanapol Inthraphuvasak scored the point for setting the fastest lap among those finishing in the top ten.

=== Feature race ===
The feature race was held on 6 July 2025, at 09:30 local time (UTC+1).

Pos.	No.	Driver	Team	Laps	Time/Gap	Grid	Pts.^{1}
1	10	(Spain) Mari Boya	Campos Racing	12	26:01.642	4	19
2	20	(France) Théophile Naël	Van Amersfoort Racing	12	+1.424	9	14
3	2	(Mexico) Noel León	Prema Racing	12	+2.350	10	12
4	25	(Poland) Roman Bilinski	Rodin Motorsport	12	+3.194	15	10
5	31	(Singapore) Christian Ho	DAMS Lucas Oil	12	+6.909	11	8
6	9	(Australia) James Wharton	ART Grand Prix	12	+8.311	20	6
7	7	(Netherlands) Laurens van Hoepen	ART Grand Prix	12	+8.796^{2}	8	4+1
8	21	(Mexico) Santiago Ramos	Van Amersfoort Racing	12	+10.636	16	3
9	18	(Spain) Bruno del Pino	MP Motorsport	12	+11.937	22	2
10	8	(Finland) Tuukka Taponen	ART Grand Prix	12	+18.532	18	1
11	22	(Portugal) Ivan Domingues	Van Amersfoort Racing	12	+19.917	21	
12	1	(Italy) Brando Badoer	Prema Racing	12	+21.965	19	
13	11	(Thailand) Tasanapol Inthraphuvasak	Campos Racing	12	+24.901^{3}	12	
14	19	(France) Alessandro Giusti	MP Motorsport	12	+27.363	17	
15	29	(Italy) Nicola Lacorte	DAMS Lucas Oil	12	+47.199^{4}	27	
16	6	(Austria) Charlie Wurz	Trident	12	+2:37.359	6	
17	14	(Norway) Martinius Stenshorne	Hitech TGR	12	+2:41.140	7	
18	17	(Germany) Tim Tramnitz	MP Motorsport	12	+2:41.857	5	
19	23	(United Kingdom) Callum Voisin	Rodin Motorsport	12	+2:43.027	25	
20	12	(Bulgaria) Nikola Tsolov	Campos Racing	12	+2:46.118	1	2
21	3	(United States) Ugo Ugochukwu	Prema Racing	12	+2:48.687	2	
22	5	(Brazil) Rafael Câmara	Trident	12	+2:50.141	3	
23	15	(United States) Nikita Johnson	Hitech TGR	11	+1 lap	26	
24	30	(Peru) Matías Zagazeta	DAMS Lucas Oil	11	+1 lap	24	
25	16	(China) Gerrard Xie	Hitech TGR	11	+1 lap	28	
26	27	(Italy) Nicola Marinangeli	AIX Racing	11	+1 lap	29	
27	26	(United Kingdom) James Hedley	AIX Racing	11	+1 lap	30	
28	4	(Denmark) Noah Strømsted	Trident	11	+1 lap	14	
DNF	24	(New Zealand) Louis Sharp	Rodin Motorsport	9	Accident	23	
DNF	28	(United States) Brad Benavides	AIX Racing	5	Retired	13	
Fastest lap: (Netherlands) Laurens van Hoepen (2:03.052 on lap 8)

Notes:

- ^1 As more than 50% but less than 75% of the scheduled race distance was completed, reduced points were awarded on a 19–14–12–10–8–6–4–3–2–1 basis to the top ten finishers.
- ^2 Laurens van Hoepen received a five-second time penalty for a false start. This demoted him from 5th to 7th.
- ^3 Tasanapol Inthraphuvasak received a ten-second time penalty for not engaging the start set-up procedure at the start of the formation lap. This demoted him from 10th to 13th.
- ^4 Nicola Lacorte received a thirty-second time penalty for a starting procedure infringement. This demoted him from 11th to 15th.

== Standings after the event ==
Drivers' Championship standings

	Pos.	Driver	Points
	1	(Brazil) Rafael Câmara	120
	2	(Germany) Tim Tramnitz	93
	3	(Bulgaria) Nikola Tsolov	91
2	4	(Spain) Mari Boya	85
1	5	(Norway) Martinius Stenshorne	76

Teams' Championship standings

	Pos.	Team	Points
1	1	(Spain) Campos Racing	209
1	2	(Italy) Trident	207
	3	(Netherlands) MP Motorsport	160
	4	(Netherlands) Van Amersfoort Racing	124
	5	(France) ART Grand Prix	119

Note: Only the top five positions are included for both sets of standings.

== See also ==
- 2025 British Grand Prix
- 2025 Silverstone Formula 2 round

Previous round: 2025 Spielberg Formula 3 round	FIA Formula 3 Championship; 2025 season	Next round: 2025 Spa-Francorchamps Formula 3 round
Previous round: 2024 Silverstone Formula 3 round	Silverstone Formula 3 round	Next round: 2026 Silverstone Formula 3 round
