= 2025 Budapest Formula 3 round =

Motor racing event

(Hungary) 2025 Budapest Formula 3 round
Round details
- Round 9 of 10 in the 2025 FIA Formula 3 Championship.
- Layout of Hungaroring
- Location: Hungaroring; Mogyoród, Hungary
- Course: Permanent racing facility 4.381 km (2.722 mi)

Sprint Race
- Date: 2 August 2025
- Laps: 19
Podium
First	(Thailand) Tasanapol Inthraphuvasak	Campos Racing
Second	(United States) Ugo Ugochukwu	Prema Racing
Third	(Austria) Charlie Wurz	Trident
Fastest lap
Driver	(Portugal) Ivan Domingues	Van Amersfoort Racing
- Time: 1:36.278 (on lap 19)

Feature Race
- Date: 3 August 2025
- Laps: 23 (24 scheduled)
Pole position
Driver	(Brazil) Rafael Câmara	Trident
Time	1:32.510	
Podium
First	(Brazil) Rafael Câmara	Trident
Second	(Spain) Mari Boya	Campos Racing
Third	(Finland) Tuukka Taponen	ART Grand Prix
Fastest lap
Driver	(Mexico) Noel León	Prema Racing
- Time: 1:50.508 (on lap 23)

The 2025 Budapest FIA Formula 3 round was a motor racing event held between 1 and 3 August 2025 at Hungaroring. It was the penultimate race of the 2025 FIA Formula 3 Championship and was held in support of the 2025 Hungarian Grand Prix.

== Report ==
=== Qualifying ===
Rafael Câmara took pole position for Trident, ahead of the Campos Racing of Mari Boya and the ART Grand Prix of Tuukka Taponen.

=== Sprint race ===
Tasanapol Inthraphuvasak started on reverse grid pole after qualifying twelfth for the feature race, with James Hedley and James Wharton behind. The top three maintained position off the start, but Alessandro Giusti fell from fourth to sixth, before making contact with Ugo Ugochukwu at turn 13, putting the MP Motorsport car out of the race with suspension damage and bringing out a safety car. The race resumed on lap 4. Ugochukwu passed Wharton for third on lap 7 and Hedley for second on lap 11, but his charge was halted by a late safety car due to a collision between Noel León and Théophile Naël. Inthraphuvasak held on to take his second F3 win, followed by Ugochukwu and Charlie Wurz.

=== Feature race ===
The race was held in wet conditions. Câmara led the field away for a rolling start, but Tim Tramnitz suffered a spin at turn 7. A safety car was called out on lap 4 for a collision between Brad Benavides and Roman Bilinski. Racing resumed on lap 7, only for another safety car period to be declared after Gerrard Xie and Ugochukwu came together at turn five. Martinius Stenshorne and Bruno del Pino gambled on dry tires, but this proved unsuccessful. Câmara held on to take victory from Boya and Taponen. The victory, his fourth of the season, was enough to seal the title with a round to spare, as rival Nikola Tsolov could only recover to sixth after starting 21st.

== Classification ==
=== Qualifying ===
Qualifying was held on 1 August 2025, at 15:00 local time (UTC+2).

Pos.	No.	Driver	Entrant	Time/Gap	Grid SR	Grid FR
1	5	(Brazil) Rafael Câmara	Trident	1:32.510	12	1
2	10	(Spain) Mari Boya	Campos Racing	+0.008	11	2
3	8	(Finland) Tuukka Taponen	ART Grand Prix	+0.142	10	3
4	16	(China) Gerrard Xie	Hitech TGR	+0.153	9	4
5	20	(France) Théophile Naël	Van Amersfoort Racing	+0.154	8	5
6	6	(Austria) Charlie Wurz	Trident	+0.227	7	6
7	3	(United States) Ugo Ugochukwu	Prema Racing	+0.228	6	7
8	1	(Italy) Brando Badoer	Prema Racing	+0.253	5	8
9	19	(France) Alessandro Giusti	MP Motorsport	+0.305	4	9
10	9	(Australia) James Wharton	ART Grand Prix	+0.329	3	10
11	26	(United Kingdom) James Hedley	AIX Racing	+0.345	2	11
12	11	(Thailand) Tasanapol Inthraphuvasak	Campos Racing	+0.384	1	12
13	2	(Mexico) Noel León	Prema Racing	+0.391	13	18
14	4	(Denmark) Noah Strømsted	Trident	+0.394	14	13
15	21	(Mexico) Santiago Ramos	Van Amersfoort Racing	+0.409	15	14
16	28	(United States) Brad Benavides	AIX Racing	+0.423	16	15
17	17	(Germany) Tim Tramnitz	MP Motorsport	+0.427	17	16
18	25	(Poland) Roman Bilinski	Rodin Motorsport	+0.473	18	17
19	7	(Netherlands) Laurens van Hoepen	ART Grand Prix	+0.484	19	19
20	14	(Norway) Martinius Stenshorne	Hitech TGR	+0.515	20	20
21	12	(Bulgaria) Nikola Tsolov	Campos Racing	+0.527	21	21
22	22	(Portugal) Ivan Domingues	Van Amersfoort Racing	+0.531	22	22
23	23	(United Kingdom) Callum Voisin	Rodin Motorsport	+0.584	26^{1}	26^{1}
24	31	(Singapore) Christian Ho	DAMS Lucas Oil	+0.607	27^{1}	27^{1}
25	30	(Peru) Matías Zagazeta	DAMS Lucas Oil	+0.651	23	23
26	29	(Italy) Nicola Lacorte	DAMS Lucas Oil	+0.652	24	24
27	18	(Spain) Bruno del Pino	MP Motorsport	+0.785	25	25
28	24	(New Zealand) Louis Sharp	Rodin Motorsport	+1.025	28	28
29	15	(United States) Nikita Johnson	Hitech TGR	+1.266	29	29
30	27	(Italy) Nicola Marinangeli	AIX Racing	+1.327	30	30

Notes:

- ^1Callum Voisin and Christian Ho were both given a five-place grid penalty for both races for impeding other drivers during qualifying.
- ^2Noel León was given a five-place grid penalty for the feature race for causing a collision in the sprint race.

=== Sprint race ===
The sprint race was held on 2 August 2025, at 10:05 local time (UTC+2).

Pos.	No.	Driver	Team	Laps	Time/Gap	Grid	Pts.
1	11	(Thailand) Tasanapol Inthraphuvasak	Campos Racing	19	35:28.270	1	10
2	3	(United States) Ugo Ugochukwu	Prema Racing	19	+0.820	6	9+1
3	6	(Austria) Charlie Wurz	Trident	19	+1.430	7	8
4	26	(United Kingdom) James Hedley	AIX Racing	19	+4.347	2	7
5	9	(Australia) James Wharton	ART Grand Prix	19	+4.645	3	6
6	1	(Italy) Brando Badoer	Prema Racing	19	+4.977	5	5
7	10	(Spain) Mari Boya	Campos Racing	19	+5.125	11	4
8	5	(Brazil) Rafael Câmara	Trident	19	+5.500	12	3
9	20	(France) Théophile Naël	Van Amersfoort Racing	19	+5.852	8	2
10	16	(China) Gerrard Xie	Hitech TGR	19	+6.559	9	1
11	8	(Finland) Tuukka Taponen	ART Grand Prix	19	+6.910	10	
12	21	(Mexico) Santiago Ramos	Van Amersfoort Racing	19	+7.752	15	
13	17	(Germany) Tim Tramnitz	MP Motorsport	19	+8.144	17	
14	25	(Poland) Roman Bilinski	Rodin Motorsport	19	+8.619	18	
15	12	(Bulgaria) Nikola Tsolov	Campos Racing	19	+8.919	21	
16	24	(New Zealand) Louis Sharp	Rodin Motorsport	19	+9.126	28	
17	4	(Denmark) Noah Strømsted	Trident	19	+9.433	14	
18	23	(United Kingdom) Callum Voisin	Rodin Motorsport	19	+9.988	26	
19	7	(Netherlands) Laurens van Hoepen	ART Grand Prix	19	+10.759	19	
20	31	(Singapore) Christian Ho	DAMS Lucas Oil	19	+10.992	27	
21	27	(Italy) Nicola Marinangeli	AIX Racing	19	+11.356	30	
22	14	(Norway) Martinius Stenshorne	Hitech TGR	19	+12.394^{1}	20	
23	15	(United States) Nikita Johnson	Hitech TGR	19	+12.689	29	
24	22	(Portugal) Ivan Domingues	Van Amersfoort Racing	19	+14.511	22	
25	18	(Spain) Bruno del Pino	MP Motorsport	19	+15.309^{2}	25	
26	30	(Peru) Matías Zagazeta	DAMS Lucas Oil	19	+23.794^{3}	23	
DNF	2	(Mexico) Noel León	Prema Racing	14	Collision	13	
DNF	28	(United States) Brad Benavides	AIX Racing	13	Retired	16	
DNF	29	(Italy) Nicola Lacorte	DAMS Lucas Oil	7	Retired	24	
DNF	19	(France) Alessandro Giusti	MP Motorsport	0	Accident	4	
Fastest lap: (Portugal) Ivan Domingues (1:36.278 on lap 19)

Notes:

- Ivan Domingues set the fastest lap, but did not finish within the top ten and was ineligible for the bonus point. Ugo Ugochukwu set the fastest lap eligible for the bonus point.
- ^1Martinius Stenshorne was given a five-second time penalty for leaving the track and gaining an advantage. This demoted him from 12th to 22nd.
- ^2Bruno del Pino was given a five-second time penalty for a false start. This demoted him from 19th to 25th.
- ^3Matías Zagazeta was given a ten-second time penalty for causing a collision. This demoted him from 24th to 26th.

=== Feature race ===
The feature race was held on 3 August 2025, at 08:30 local time (UTC+2).

Pos.	No.	Driver	Team	Laps	Time/Gap	Grid	Pts.
1	5	(Brazil) Rafael Câmara	Trident	23	47:14.331	1	25+2
2	10	(Spain) Mari Boya	Campos Racing	23	+1.937	2	18+1
3	8	(Finland) Tuukka Taponen	ART Grand Prix	23	+12.994	3	15
4	6	(Austria) Charlie Wurz	Trident	23	+13.621	6	12
5	20	(France) Théophile Naël	Van Amersfoort Racing	23	+14.167	5	10
6	12	(Bulgaria) Nikola Tsolov	Campos Racing	23	+14.916	21	8
7	1	(Italy) Brando Badoer	Prema Racing	23	+20.933	8	6
8	7	(Netherlands) Laurens van Hoepen	ART Grand Prix	23	+21.732	19	4
9	19	(France) Alessandro Giusti	MP Motorsport	23	+23.299	9	2
10	11	(Thailand) Tasanapol Inthraphuvasak	Campos Racing	23	+25.032	12	1
11	24	(New Zealand) Louis Sharp	Rodin Motorsport	23	+25.328	28	
12	4	(Denmark) Noah Strømsted	Trident	23	+25.973	13	
13	17	(Germany) Tim Tramnitz	MP Motorsport	23	+30.709	16	
14	25	(Poland) Roman Bilinski	Rodin Motorsport	23	+32.099	17	
15	23	(United Kingdom) Callum Voisin	Rodin Motorsport	23	+35.041^{1}	26	
16	30	(Peru) Matías Zagazeta	DAMS Lucas Oil	23	+38.140	23	
17	2	(Mexico) Noel León	Prema Racing	23	+38.764^{2}	18	
18	29	(Italy) Nicola Lacorte	DAMS Lucas Oil	23	+42.994	24	
19	21	(Mexico) Santiago Ramos	Van Amersfoort Racing	23	+43.328	14	
20	31	(Singapore) Christian Ho	DAMS Lucas Oil	23	+44.776	27	
21	15	(United States) Nikita Johnson	Hitech TGR	23	+48.025	29	
22	26	(United Kingdom) James Hedley	AIX Racing	23	+56.891	11	
23	27	(Italy) Nicola Marinangeli	AIX Racing	23	+1:13.728	30	
24	22	(Portugal) Ivan Domingues	Van Amersfoort Racing	23	+1:18.531	22	
25	18	(Spain) Bruno del Pino	MP Motorsport	22	+1 lap	25	
26	14	(Norway) Martinius Stenshorne	Hitech TGR	22	+1 lap	20	
27	9	(Australia) James Wharton	ART Grand Prix	20	Retired	10	
DNF	16	(China) Gerrard Xie	Hitech TGR	6	Collision	4	
DNF	3	(United States) Ugo Ugochukwu	Prema Racing	6	Collision	7	
DNF	28	(United States) Brad Benavides	AIX Racing	2	Collision	15	
Fastest lap: (Mexico) Noel León (1:50.508 on lap 23)

Notes:

- Noel León set the fastest lap, but did not finish within the top ten and was ineligible for the bonus point. Mari Boya set the fastest lap eligible for the bonus point.
- ^1Callum Voisin was given a five-second time penalty for causing a collision. This demoted him from 14th to 15th.
- ^2Noel León was given a ten-second time penalty for causing a collision. This demoted him from 13th to 17th.

== Standings after the event ==
Drivers' Championship standings

	Pos.	Driver	Points
	1	(Brazil) Rafael Câmara	156
2	2	(Spain) Mari Boya	108
1	3	(Bulgaria) Nikola Tsolov	106
1	4	(Germany) Tim Tramnitz	93
	5	(Norway) Martinius Stenshorne	80

Teams' Championship standings

	Pos.	Team	Points
	1	(Italy) Trident	282
	2	(Spain) Campos Racing	263
	3	(Netherlands) MP Motorsport	166
1	4	(France) ART Grand Prix	144
1	5	(Netherlands) Van Amersfoort Racing	136

Note: Only the top five positions are included for both sets of standings.

== See also ==
- 2025 Hungarian Grand Prix
- 2025 Budapest Formula 2 round

Previous round: 2025 Spa-Francorchamps Formula 3 round	FIA Formula 3 Championship; 2025 season	Next round: 2025 Monza Formula 3 round
Previous round: 2024 Budapest Formula 3 round	Budapest Formula 3 round	Next round: 2026 Budapest Formula 3 round
