= Alessandro Giusti =

French racing driver (born 2006)

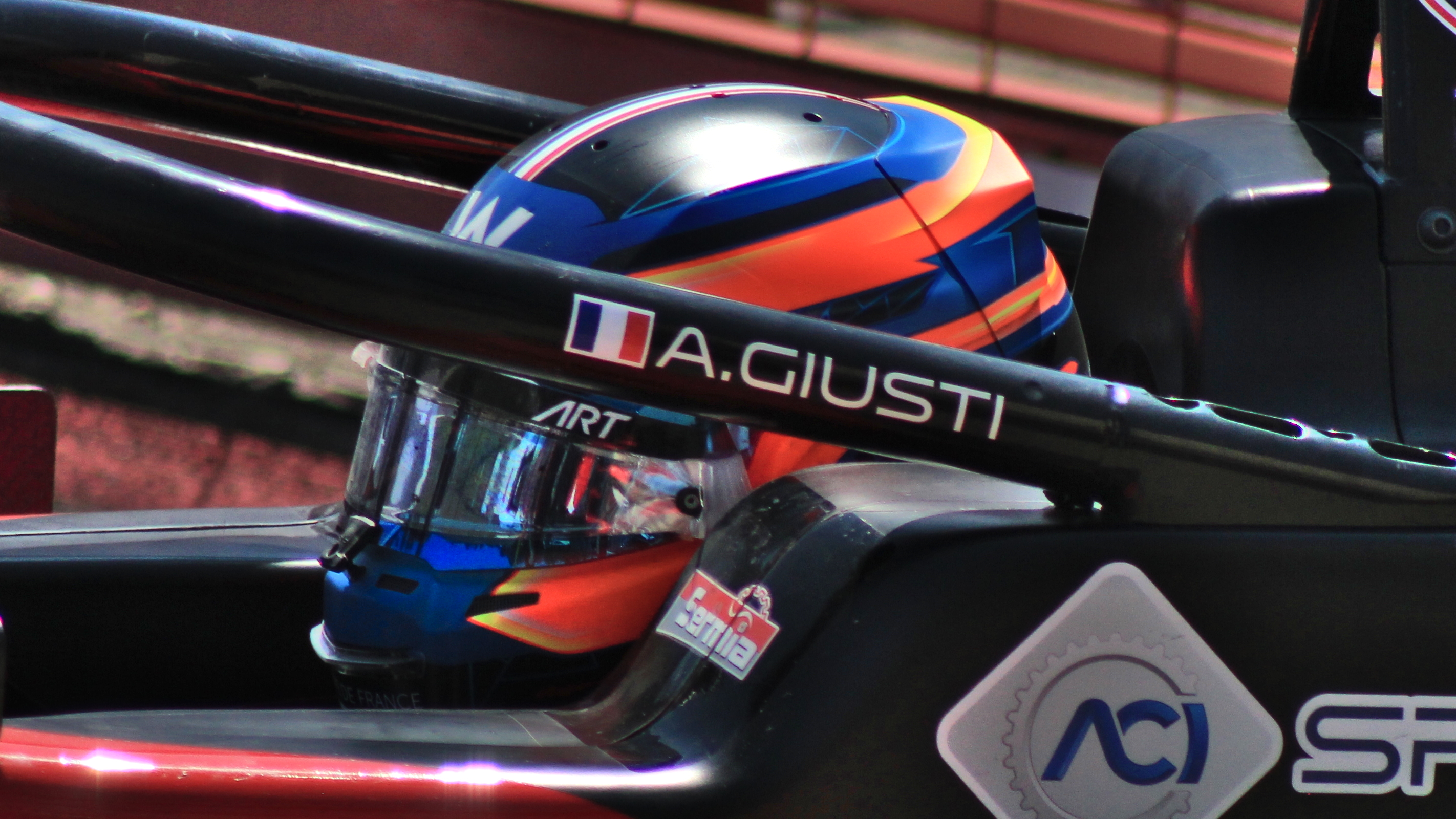
- Giusti in 2024
- Nationality: (France) French
- Born: 10 September 2006 (age 20) Bièvres, Essonne, France

FIA Formula 3 Championship career
- Debut season: 2025
- Current team: Rodin Motorsport
- Car number: TBA
- Former teams: MP Motorsport
- Starts: 38
- Wins: 0
- Podiums: 2
- Poles: 0
- Fastest laps: 1
- Best finish: 10th in 2025

Previous series
- 2023–2024; 2021–2022: FR European; French F4

Championship titles
- 2022: French F4
- Statistics up to date as of 17 October 2026.

Alessandro "Sandro" Giusti (French pronunciation: [a.les.sã.dʁo ʒys.ti]; born 10 September 2006) is a French racing driver who is set to compete in the FIA Formula 3 Championship for Rodin Motorsport as part of the Williams Driver Academy.

Previously, Giusti competed in the French F4 Championship, where he was the 2022 champion. He competed with ART Grand Prix in the 2024 Formula Regional European Championship, finishing fourth overall. He is a member of the Williams Driver Academy.

== Career ==
=== Formula 4 ===
==== 2021 ====
Giusti made his car racing debut in 2021, competing in the French F4 Championship. He would claim his first win in the series at the Hungaroring after overtaking polesitter Enzo Géraci, and holding the lead until the end of the race. He would clinch a second victory later that season at Race 2 at Magny-Cours.

==== 2022 ====
Giusti returned to French F4 in 2022 for his sophomore season. He would go on to win the championship, claiming five race wins.

=== Formula Regional European Championship ===
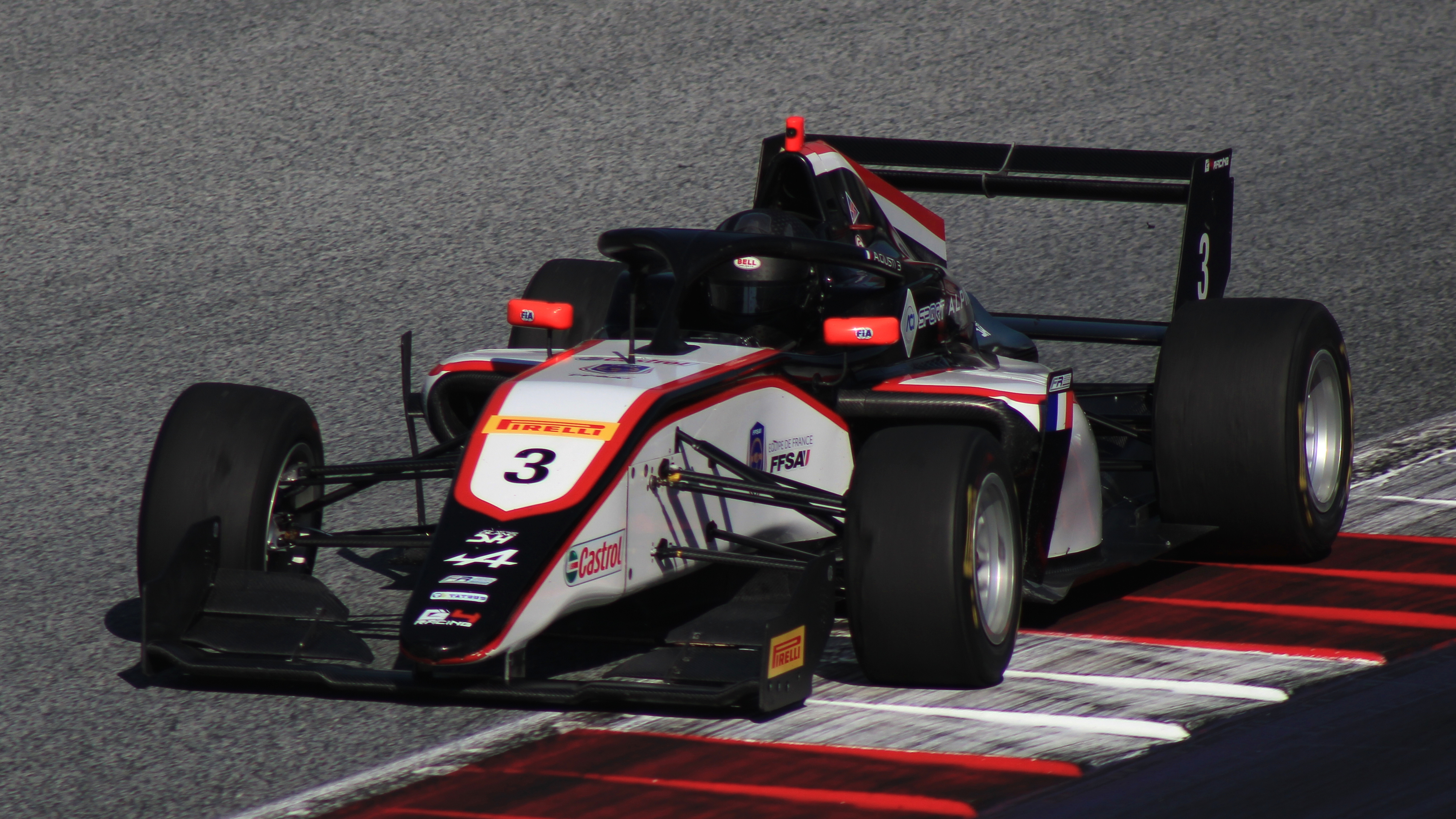
Giusti at the Red Bull Ring in 2023

==== 2023 ====
In 2023, Giusti stepped up to the Formula Regional European Championship, driving for G4 Racing. During race 1 at the Circuit Paul Ricard, he would achieve his maiden victory after starting from pole position. His second win would come at the Red Bull Ring, coincidentally on his 17th birthday. During the following race in Monza, Giusti would finish third, but went on to inherit his third win after winner Andrea Kimi Antonelli and runner-up Marcus Amand were both penalized after the race. He would go on to finish the season in sixth with 111 points.

==== 2024 ====
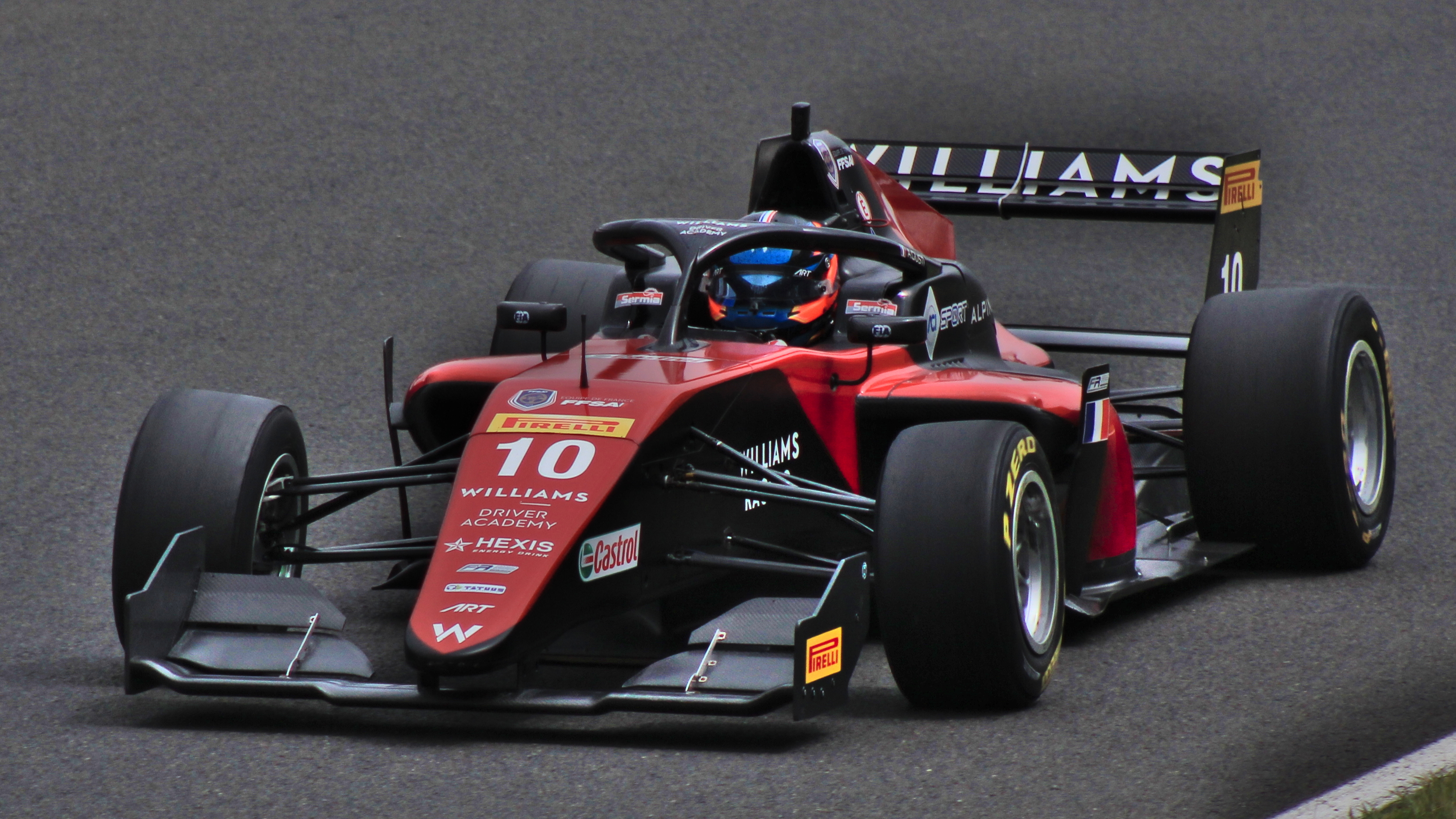
Giusti driving at the Hungaroring during the 2024 Formula Regional European Championship

For 2024, Giusti remained in Formula Regional European Championship, but he would switch to ART Grand Prix. Giusti secured his first win of the season during a chaotic and rainy race 2 at Paul Ricard. His next win came during another rainy race, this time in Imola. He started the race in fourth, and managed to maintain the lead throughout three different safety car appearances.

=== FIA Formula 3 ===
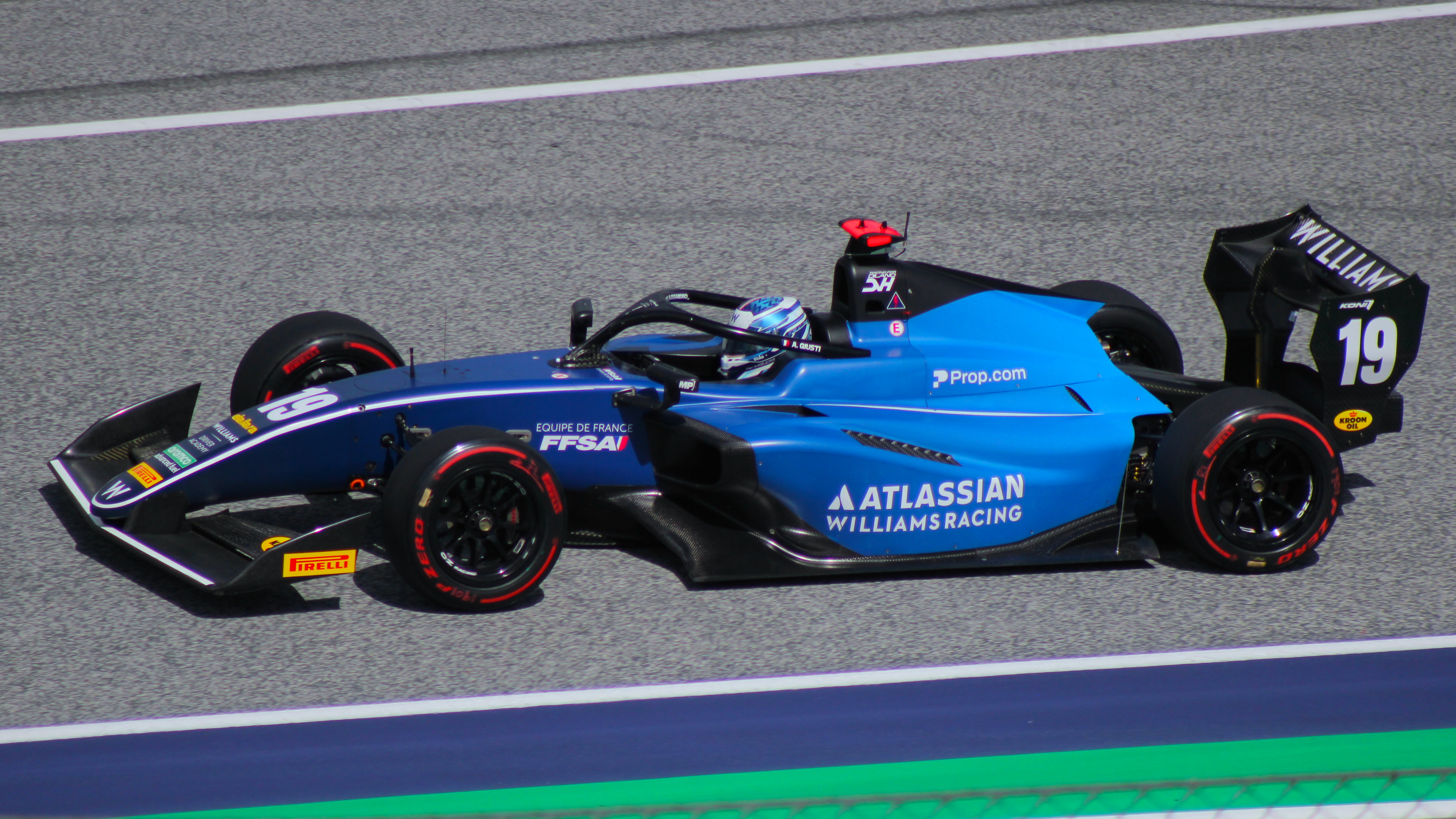
Giusti driving the Dallara F3 2025 during the 2025 Spielberg Formula 3 round

==== 2025 ====
Giusti stepped up to FIA Formula 3 with MP Motorsport for the 2025 season, partnering alongside Bruno del Pino and Red Bull junior Tim Tramnitz.

==== 2026 ====
Giusti remained with MP Motorsport for his second season of Formula 3 in 2026.

==== 2027 ====
Remaining in the category for a third season, Giusti will switch to Rodin Motorsport in 2027, partnering Reza Seewooruthun and Pedro Clerot.

=== Formula One ===
Giusti joined the Williams Driver Academy in January 2024.

=== Formula E ===
In July 2025, Giusti tested a Formula E car for the first time during the Berlin rookie test at the Tempelhof Airport Street Circuit, driving for Lola Yamaha ABT. In January 2026, he was selected by Jaguar TCS Racing to partake in the Miami ePrix rookie test.

== Racing record ==
=== Racing career summary ===
Season	Series	Team	Races	Wins	Poles	F/Laps	Podiums	Points	Position
2021	French F4 Championship	FFSA Academy	20	2	1	1	6	147	6th
2022	French F4 Championship	FFSA Academy	20	2	6	2	12	300	**1st**
2023	Formula Regional European Championship	G4 Racing	20	3	2	3	4	111	6th
2024	Formula Regional European Championship	ART Grand Prix	20	2	0	2	7	195	4th
2025	FIA Formula 3 Championship	MP Motorsport	19	0	0	1	2	67	10th
2026	FIA Formula 3 Championship	MP Motorsport	19	0	0	0	0	45	15th
2027	FIA Formula 3 Championship	Rodin Motorsport	0	0	0	0	0	0	TBD

* Season still in progress.

=== Complete French F4 Championship results ===
(key) (Races in bold indicate pole position) (Races in italics indicate fastest lap)

Year	1	2	3	4	5	6	7	8	9	10	11	12	13	14	15	16	17	18	19	20	21	Pos	Points
2021	NOG; 1; 8	NOG; 2; 2	NOG; 3; 8	MAG1; 1; 6	MAG1; 2; 8	MAG1; 3; 6	HUN; 1; 9	HUN; 2; 1	HUN; 3; 9	LÉD; 1; 7	LÉD; 2 Ret	LÉD; 3; 7	MNZ; 1; 11	MNZ; 2; 7	**MNZ**; **3** C	LEC; 1; 5	LEC; 2; 9	LEC; 3; 2	MAG2; 1; 3	MAG2; 2; 1	MAG2; 3; 2	6th	147
2022	NOG; 1; 6	NOG; 2; 6	NOG; 3; 3	PAU; 1; 3	PAU; 2; 4	PAU; 3; 3	MAG; 1; 4	MAG; 2 DNS	MAG; 3; 3	SPA; 1; 2	SPA; 2; 9	SPA; 3; 3	**LÉD**; **1**; 2	LÉD; 2; 4	**LÉD**; **3**; 1	**CRT**; **1**; 2	CRT; 2; 5	**CRT**; **3**; 2	**LEC**; **1**; 2	LEC; 2; 6	**LEC**; **3**; 1	1st	300

=== Complete Formula Regional European Championship results ===
(key) (Races in bold indicate pole position) (Races in italics indicate fastest lap)

Year	Team	1	2	3	4	5	6	7	8	9	10	11	12	13	14	15	16	17	18	19	20	DC	Points
2023	G4 Racing	IMO; 1; 7	IMO; 2 Ret	CAT; 1; 13	CAT; 2; 17	HUN; 1; 14	HUN; 2 Ret	SPA; 1 Ret	SPA; 2; 13	MUG; 1; 10	MUG; 2; 12	**LEC**; **1**; 1	LEC; 2; 5	RBR; 1; 2	**RBR**; **2**; 1	MNZ; 1; 1	MNZ; 2; 18	ZAN; 1; 11	ZAN; 2 Ret	HOC; 1 Ret	HOC; 2; 17	6th	111
2024	ART Grand Prix	HOC; 1; 8	HOC; 2; 14	SPA; 1; 7	SPA; 2; 4	ZAN; 1; 3	ZAN; 2; 3	HUN; 1; 4	HUN; 2; 7	MUG; 1; 11	MUG; 2; 8	LEC; 1; 7	LEC; 2; 1	IMO; 1; 5	IMO; 2; 1	RBR; 1; 3	RBR; 2 Ret	CAT; 1; 8	CAT; 2; 2	MNZ; 1 Ret	MNZ; 2; 2	4th	195

=== Complete FIA Formula 3 Championship results ===
(key) (Races in bold indicate pole position) (Races in italics indicate fastest lap)

Year	Entrant	1	2	3	4	5	6	7	8	9	10	11	12	13	14	15	16	17	18	19	20	DC	Points
2025	MP Motorsport	MEL; SPR; 11	MEL; FEA; 25	BHR; SPR; 7	BHR; FEA; 7	IMO; SPR; 10	IMO; FEA; 7	MON; SPR; 4	MON; FEA; 10	CAT; SPR; 6	CAT; FEA; 3	RBR; SPR; 2	RBR; FEA; 12	SIL; SPR; 12	SIL; FEA; 14	SPA; SPR; 10	SPA; FEA; C	HUN; SPR; Ret	HUN; FEA; 9	MNZ; SPR; 6	MNZ; FEA; 8	10th	67
2026	MP Motorsport	MEL; SPR; 21	MEL; FEA; 15	MON; SPR; 4	MON; FEA; 7	CAT; SPR; 12	CAT; FEA; 17	RBR; SPR; 11	RBR; FEA; 22	SIL; SPR; 11	SIL; FEA; 13	SPA; SPR; 9	SPA; FEA; 9	HUN; SPR; 13	HUN; FEA; 17	MNZ; SPR; 5	MNZ; FEA; 25†	MAD; SPR; 5	MAD; FEA1; 6	MAD; FEA2; 6		15th	45
2027	Rodin Motorsport	BHR; SPR	BHR; FEA	JED; SPR	JED; FEA	MEL; SPR	MEL; FEA	MTL; SPR	MTL; FEA	MON; SPR	MON; FEA	SIL; SPR	SIL; FEA	RBR; SPR	RBR; FEA	MNZ; SPR	MNZ; FEA	MAD; SPR	MAD; FEA	IST; SPR	IST; FEA	TBD	TBD

Sporting positions
Preceded by Esteban Masson	French F4 Championship; Champion; 2022	Succeeded by Evan Giltaire
