= Ivan Domingues =

Portuguese racing driver (born 2006)

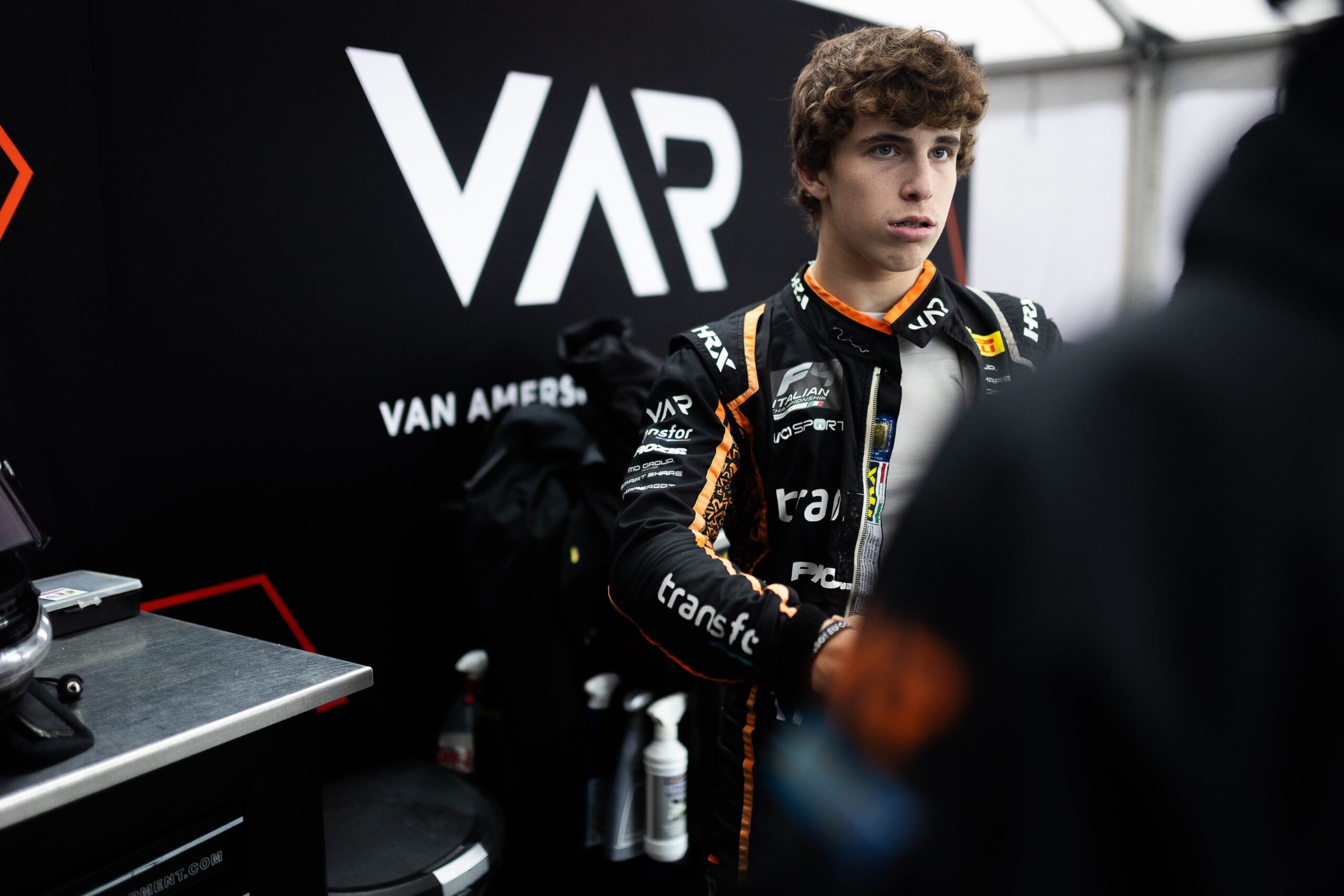
- Domingues in 2024
- Nationality: (Portugal) Portuguese
- Born: Ivan Franco Domingues; 5 May 2006 (age 20) Leiria, Portugal

FIA Formula 3 Championship career
- Debut season: 2025
- Current team: Van Amersfoort Racing
- Car number: 22
- Starts: 19
- Wins: 1
- Podiums: 1
- Poles: 0
- Fastest laps: 0
- Best finish: 19th in 2025

Previous series
- 2023–2024 2023 2022–2023 2022: FR European Championship; Euro 4 Championship; Italian F4 Championship; Formula 4 UAE Championship

Ivan Franco Domingues (born 5 May 2006) is a Portuguese racing driver who last competed in the FIA Formula 3 Championship for Van Amersfoort Racing.

Domingues most recently competed in the 2024 Formula Regional European Championship with the team. By winning the 2025 Barcelona Formula 3 sprint race, Domingues became the first Portuguese driver ever to win an FIA Formula 3 race.

== Early and personal life ==
Ivan Franco Domingues was born on 5 May 2006 in Leiria, Portugal. His father runs an auto spares parts business in Portugal. Domingues enjoys playing video games in his free time, especially Rocket League

== Career ==
=== Karting ===
Domingues began karting at the age of eight. He raced in national competitions at a young age and also won the Portuguese Cup in three successive seasons. Despite his success at home, he would struggle to stay competitive as he made the move to European karting.

=== Formula 4 ===
==== 2022 ====
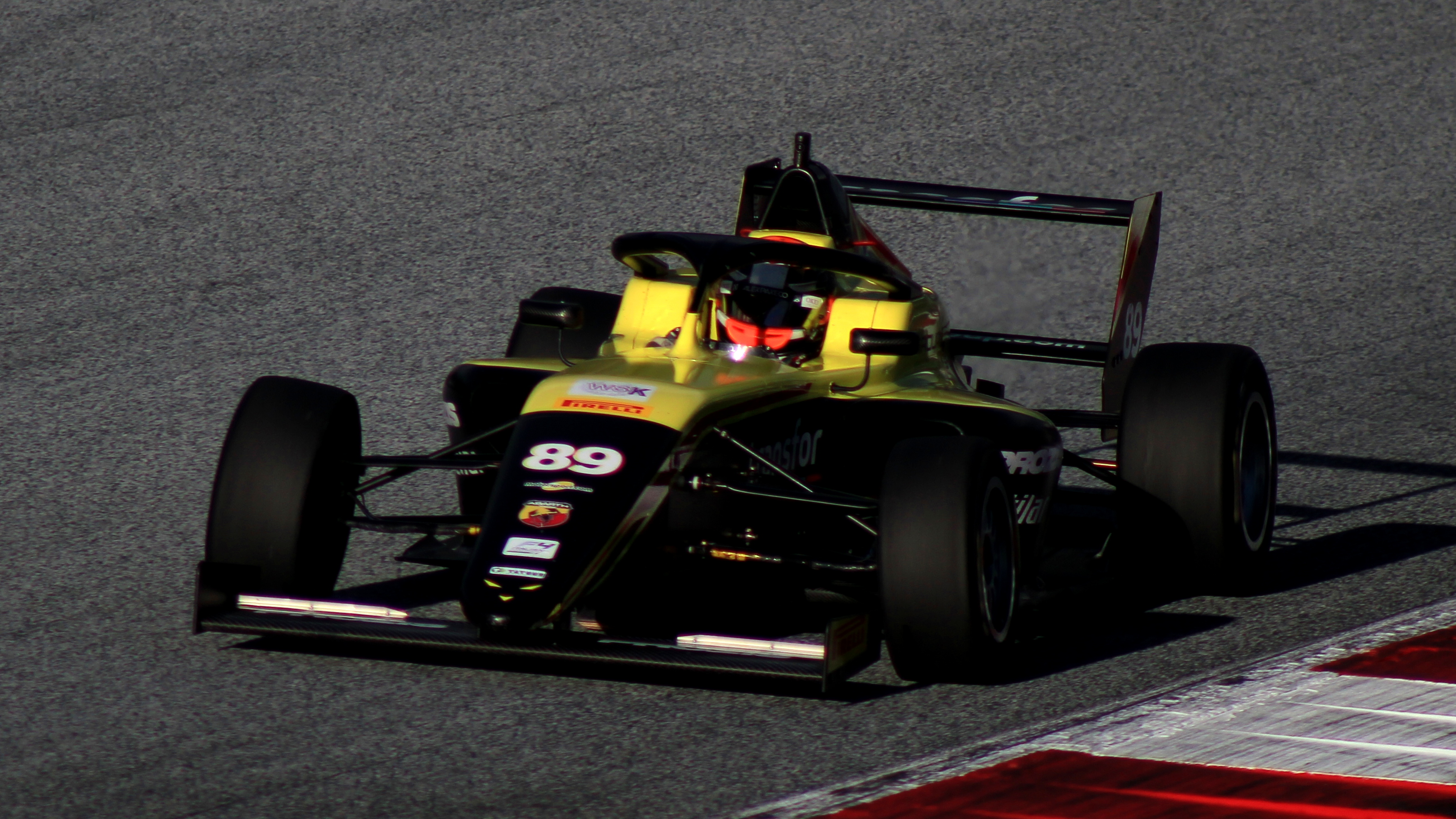
Domingues at the Red Bull Ring during the 2022 Italian F4 Championship

At the start of 2022, Domingues made his single-seater debut with Xcel Motorsport in the Formula 4 UAE Championship. Following two point-less rounds, Domingues scored his first points in the second Dubai Autodrome round. In the fourth round, he achieved his maiden pole position in car racing after a disappointing session just minutes prior. He went on to finish third and took another podium in the season finale at Yas Marina. Domingues finished 16th in the standings, just nine points behind his experienced teammate Jamie Day.

Following that campaign, Domingues was announced to be joining Maya Weug at Iron Lynx in Italian F4. Domingues scored a pole position in wet conditions during the opening event at Imola. He finished 15th in the standings, with 21 points.

==== 2023 ====
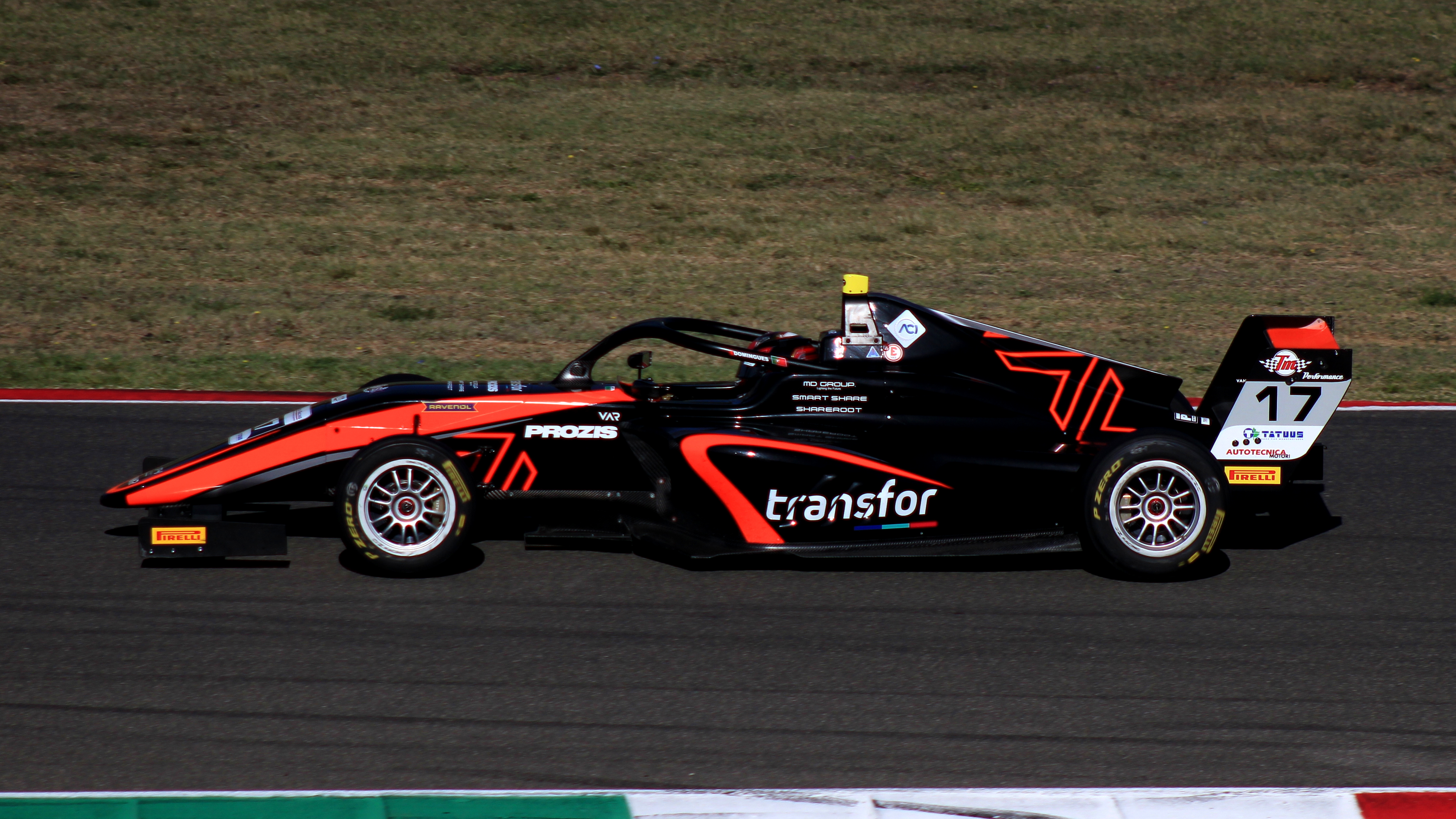
Domingues during the 2023 Italian F4 Championship at the Mugello Circuit

Domingues remained in the series for the 2023 season, switching to Van Amersfoort Racing. He scored only one podium that year, being the third race in Imola. He achieved multiple points finishes later in the season and placed 11th in the standings, with 56 points.

=== Formula Regional ===
==== 2023 ====
Domingues progressed to the 2023 Formula Regional European Championship for the final two rounds with Van Amersfoort Racing, competing as a guest driver.

==== 2024 ====
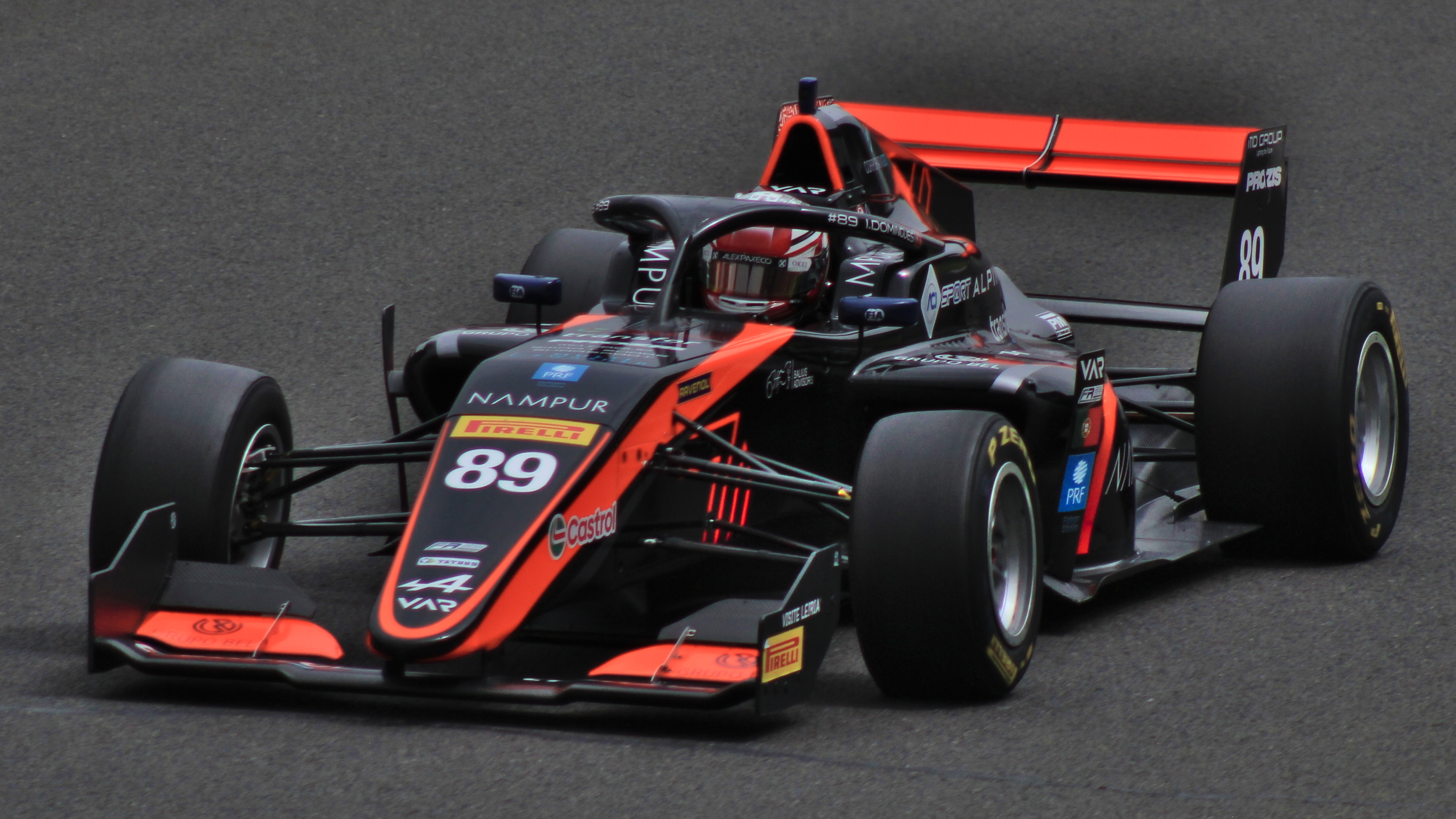
Domingues driving at the Hungaroring during the 2024 Formula Regional European Championship

Domingues continued in FRECA on a full-time basis in 2024, remaining with Van Amersfoort Racing. He experienced a strong opening round, securing fifth and a debut podium in the Hockenheim opener. Domingues had a scoreless second round, but was able to notch up consistent points finishes throughout the season, even securing another third placed podium at Mugello. Domingues wrapped his season tenth in the standings, with 78 points, behind teammates Pedro Clerot and Brando Badoer.

=== FIA Formula 3 Championship ===
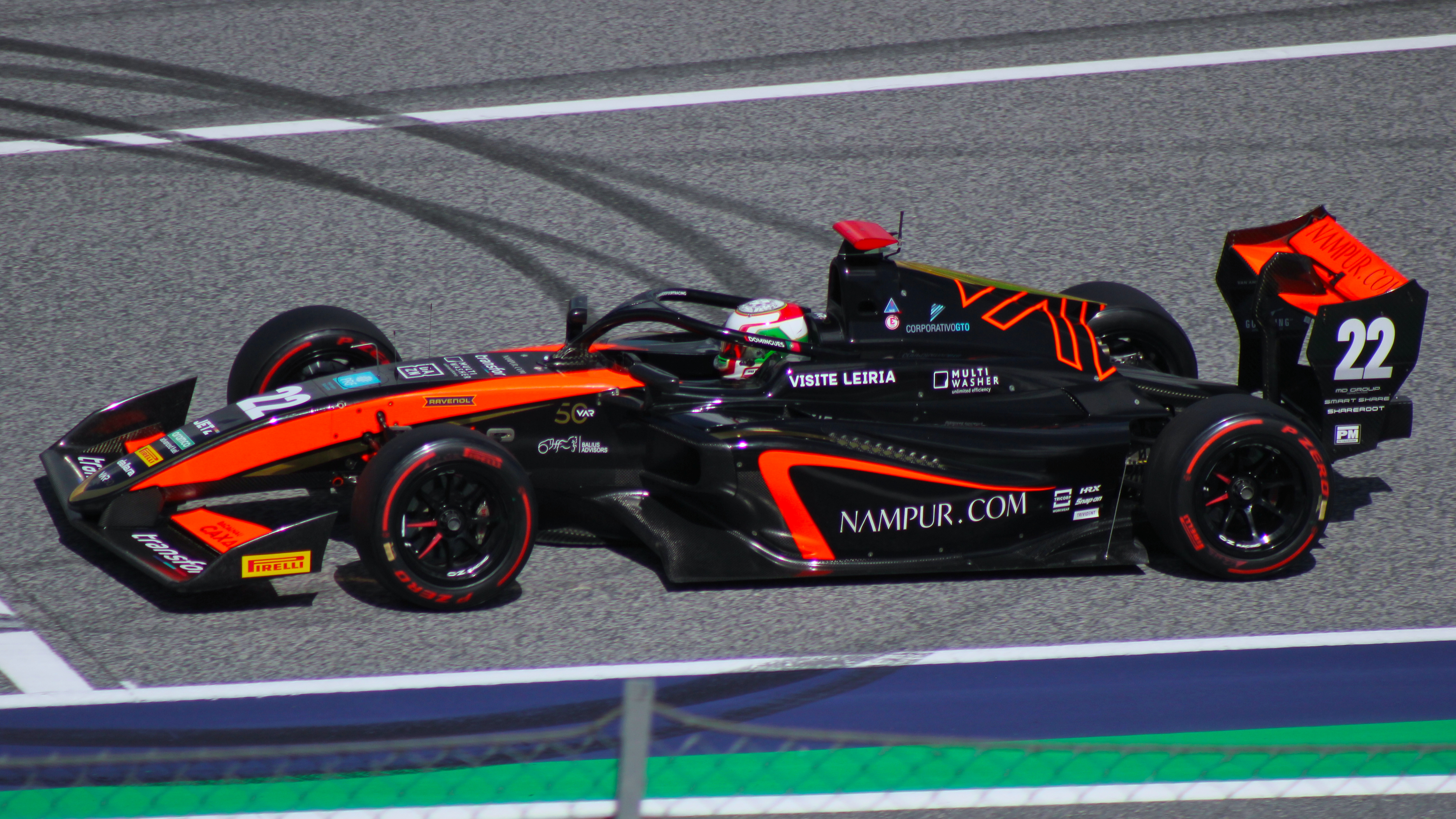
Domingues driving the Dallara F3 2025 during the 2025 Spielberg Formula 3 round

Domingues moved up to FIA Formula 3 for 2025, continuing his relationship with Van Amersfoort Racing. The campaign began with three qualifying results of 23rd or worse, compounded by collisions with Joshua Dufek and James Wharton in the races at Bahrain, a spin at Tosa during the Imola sprint race, and a retirement after being hit by Brad Benavides in the Imola feature. Domingues qualified 17th in Monaco but was eliminated in a lap 1 collision during the sprint race. His breakthrough came in Spain, where Domingues qualified a season-best seventh, meaning he started the sprint from sixth. A chaotic start which eliminated multiple frontrunners allowed Domingues to take the lead on the opening lap, one that he would keep until the end to take his first single-seater victory on his 95th attempt. The next day, he backed his success with sixth in the feature race. Thereafter, he failed to score points throughout the rest of the season, meaning Domingues finished 19th in the standings with 18 points; placing behind teammates Santiago Ramos and Théophile Naël. He was expected to remain with the team for 2026, but he was not retained following a string of retirements towards the end of the season.

=== USF Pro 2000 Championship ===
In October 2025, Domingues took part in a USF Pro 2000 test with Pabst Racing at the Indianapolis Motor Speedway.

== Karting record ==
=== Karting career summary ===
Season	Series	Team	Position
2015	Taça de Portugal de Karting — Cadetes		6th
2016	Andrea Margutti Trophy — 60 Mini		54th
2017	WSK Champions Cup — 60 Mini	DPK Racing	NC
2017	South Garda Winter Cup — Mini ROK		NC
2017	WSK Super Master Series — 60 Mini	DPK Racing	NC
2017	WSK Final Cup — 60 Mini	CROC PROMOTION	29th
2018	IAME Winter Cup — X30 Mini	Dinamica Paralela	7th
2018	WSK Champions Cup — 60 Mini	CROCPROMOTION	31st
2018	WSK Super Master Series — 60 Mini	CROCPROMOTION	44th
2018	WSK Open Cup — 60 Mini	Mad-Croc Karting	20th
2019	South Garda Winter Cup — OKJ	Mec Kart Manufacturing	75th
2019	WSK Super Master Series — OKJ	Mec Kart Manufacturing	48th
2019	WSK Euro Series — OKJ	Mec Kart Manufacturing	67th
2019	CIK-FIA European Championship — OKJ	Mec Kart Manufacturing	72nd
2019	Campeonato de Portugal de Karting — Junior		**2nd**
2019	IAME International Final — X30 Junior		NC
2019	WSK Open Cup — OKJ	Lennox Racing Team Srl	61st
2019	SKUSA SuperNationals — X30 Junior		NC
2020	South Garda Winter Cup — OKJ	Leclerc By Lennox Racing	74th
2020	WSK Super Master Series — OKJ	Leclerc By Lennox Racing	45th
2020	CIK-FIA European Championship — OKJ	Leclerc By Lennox Racing	45th
2020	WSK Euro Series — OKJ	Leclerc By Lennox Racing	34th
2020	CIK-FIA Academy Trophy	Domingues, Manuel Rosa	20th
2020	ROK Cup International Final — Junior ROK		4th
2020	Champions of the Future — OKJ		14th
2020	CIK-FIA World Championship — OKJ	Leclerc By Lennox Racing	56th
2020	International IAME Games — X30 Junior		35th
2021	WSK Champions Cup — OK	Leclerc By Lennox Racing	NC
2021	WSK Super Master Series — OK	Leclerc By Lennox Racing	34th
2021	WSK Euro Series — OK	DPK Racing	30th
2021	CIK-FIA European Championship — OK	DPK Racing	34th
2021	Champions of the Future — OK		32nd
2021	CIK-FIA World Championship — OK	DPK Racing	46th

=== Complete CIK-FIA Karting European Championship results ===
(key) (Races in bold indicate pole position) (Races in italics indicate fastest lap)

Year	Team	Class	1	2	3	4	5	6	7	8	DC	Points
2019	Mec Kart Manufacturing Srl	OKJ	ANG; QH; 60	ANG; R DNQ	GEN; QH; 70	GEN; R DNQ	KRI; QH; 68	KRI; R DNQ	LEM; QH; 57	LEM; R DNQ	72nd	0
2020	Leclerc by Lennox Racing	OKJ	ZUE; QH; 32	ZUE; R 29	SAR; QH; 48	SAR; R DNQ	WAC; QH; 64	WAC; R DNQ			45th	0
2021	DPK Racing	OK	GEN; QH; 24	GEN; R 33	AUB; QH; 42	AUB; R DNQ	SAR; QH; 36	SAR; R 19	ZUE; QH; 51	ZUE; R DNQ	34th	0

== Racing record ==
=== Racing career summary ===
Season	Series	Team	Races	Wins	Poles	F/Laps	Podiums	Points	Position
2022	Formula 4 UAE Championship	Xcel Motorsport	20	0	1	0	2	39	16th
2022	Italian F4 Championship	Iron Lynx	19	0	1	0	0	21	15th
2023	Italian F4 Championship	Van Amersfoort Racing	17	0	0	0	1	56	11th
2023	Euro 4 Championship	Van Amersfoort Racing	6	0	0	0	0	28	11th
2023	Formula Regional European Championship	Van Amersfoort Racing	4	0	0	0	0	0	NC†
2024	Formula Regional European Championship	Van Amersfoort Racing	20	0	0	0	2	78	10th
2025	FIA Formula 3 Championship	Van Amersfoort Racing	19	1	0	1	1	18	19th

† As Domingues was a guest driver, he was ineligible to score points or be classified in the championship.
* Season still in progress.

=== Complete Formula 4 UAE Championship results ===
(key) (Races in bold indicate pole position) (Races in italics indicate fastest lap)

Year	Team	1	2	3	4	5	6	7	8	9	10	11	12	13	14	15	16	17	18	19	20	Pos	Points
2022	Xcel Motorsport	YMC1; 1; 17	YMC1; 2; 12	YMC1; 3; 12	YMC1; 4; 11	DUB1; 1; 22	DUB1; 2; 20	DUB1; 3; 13	DUB1; 4; 20	DUB2; 1; 9	DUB2; 2; 25	DUB2; 3; 13	DUB2; 4; 10	DUB3; 1; 7	DUB3; 2; 17	**DUB3**; **3**; 3	DUB3; 4 Ret	YMC2; 1; 26	YMC2; 2; 11	YMC2; 3; 3	YMC2; 4 Ret	16th	39

=== Complete Italian F4 Championship results ===
(key) (Races in bold indicate pole position) (Races in italics indicate fastest lap)

Year	Team	1	2	3	4	5	6	7	8	9	10	11	12	13	14	15	16	17	18	19	20	21	22	DC	Points
2022	Iron Lynx	IMO; 1; 9	IMO; 2; 7	**IMO**; **3**; 27†	MIS; 1; 22	MIS; 2; 8	MIS; 3; 11	SPA; 1; 12	SPA; 2; 8	SPA; 3; 12	VLL; 1; 12	VLL; 2; 12	VLL; 3; 10	RBR; 1 Ret	RBR; 2; 8	RBR; 3	RBR; 4; 20	MNZ; 1; 36†	MNZ; 2 WD	MNZ; 3 C	MUG; 1; 18	MUG; 2; 16	MUG; 3 Ret	15th	21
2023	Van Amersfoort Racing	IMO; 1	IMO; 2; 4	IMO; 3; 3	IMO; 4; 24	MIS; 1; 23	MIS; 2; 5	MIS; 3; 7	SPA; 1; 20	SPA; 2; 11	SPA; 3 DNS	MNZ; 1; 16	MNZ; 2 Ret	MNZ; 3; 29†	LEC; 1; 6	LEC; 2; 30	LEC; 3; 23	MUG; 1; 10	MUG; 2; 19	MUG; 3; 8	VLL; 1	VLL; 2	VLL; 3	11th	56

=== Complete Euro 4 Championship results ===
(key) (Races in bold indicate pole position; races in italics indicate fastest lap)

Year	Team	1	2	3	4	5	6	7	8	9	DC	Points
2023	Van Amersfoort Racing	MUG; 1; 11	MUG; 2; 23	MUG; 3; 4	MNZ; 1; 6	MNZ; 2; 13	MNZ; 3; 6	CAT; 1	CAT; 2	CAT; 3	11th	28

=== Complete Formula Regional European Championship results ===
(key) (Races in bold indicate pole position) (Races in italics indicate fastest lap)

Year	Team	1	2	3	4	5	6	7	8	9	10	11	12	13	14	15	16	17	18	19	20	DC	Points
2023	Van Amersfoort Racing	IMO; 1	IMO; 2	CAT; 1	CAT; 2	HUN; 1	HUN; 2	SPA; 1	SPA; 2	MUG; 1	MUG; 2	LEC; 1	LEC; 2	RBR; 1	RBR; 2	MNZ; 1	MNZ; 2	ZAN; 1; 22	ZAN; 2; 20	HOC; 1 Ret	HOC; 2; 16	NC†	0
2024	Van Amersfoort Racing	HOC; 1; 5	HOC; 2; 3	SPA; 1; 17	SPA; 2; 27	ZAN; 1; 7	ZAN; 2; 7	HUN; 1; 10	HUN; 2; 17	MUG; 1; 3	MUG; 2; 7	LEC; 1; 4	LEC; 2; 8	IMO; 1 Ret	IMO; 2; 16	RBR; 1; 19	RBR; 2; 10	CAT; 1; 10	CAT; 2; 10	MNZ; 1; 13	MNZ; 2; 15	10th	78

† As Domingues was a guest driver, he was ineligible to score points or be classified in the championship.

=== Complete FIA Formula 3 Championship results ===
(key) (Races in bold indicate pole position) (Races in italics indicate fastest lap)

Year	Entrant	1	2	3	4	5	6	7	8	9	10	11	12	13	14	15	16	17	18	19	20	DC	Points
2025	Van Amersfoort Racing	MEL; SPR; 21	MEL; FEA; 19	BHR; SPR; Ret	BHR; FEA; 19	IMO; SPR; 25	IMO; FEA; Ret	MON; SPR; Ret	MON; FEA; 20	CAT; SPR; 1	CAT; FEA; 6	RBR; SPR; Ret	RBR; FEA; 21	SIL; SPR; 17	SIL; FEA; 11	SPA; SPR; 29	SPA; FEA; C	HUN; SPR; 24	HUN; FEA; 24	MNZ; SPR; Ret	MNZ; FEA; Ret	19th	18
