= 2025 Sakhir Formula 3 round =

Second round of the 2025 FIA Formula 3 season

(Bahrain) 2025 Sakhir Formula 3 round
Round details
- Round 2 of 10 in the 2025 FIA Formula 3 Championship.
- Layout of the Bahrain International Circuit
- Location: Bahrain International Circuit; Sakhir, Bahrain
- Course: Permanent racing facility 5.412 km (3.363 mi)

Sprint Race
- Date: 12 April 2025
- Laps: 19
Podium
First	(Bulgaria) Nikola Tsolov	Campos Racing
Second	(United Kingdom) Freddie Slater	AIX Racing
Third	(Finland) Tuukka Taponen	ART Grand Prix
Fastest lap
Driver	(United Kingdom) Freddie Slater	AIX Racing
- Time: 1:53.383 (on lap 2)

Feature Race
- Date: 13 April 2025
- Laps: 22
Pole position
Driver	(Brazil) Rafael Câmara	Trident
Time	1:49.214	
Podium
First	(Brazil) Rafael Câmara	Trident
Second	(United Kingdom) Callum Voisin	Rodin Motorsport
Third	(Germany) Tim Tramnitz	MP Motorsport
Fastest lap
Driver	(Brazil) Rafael Câmara	Trident
- Time: 1:52.931 (on lap 5)

The 2025 Sakhir FIA Formula 3 round was a motor racing event held between 11 and 13 April 2025 at the Bahrain International Circuit in Sakhir, Bahrain. It was the second round of the 2025 FIA Formula 3 Championship and was held in support of the 2025 Bahrain Grand Prix.

== Classification ==
=== Qualifying ===
Pos.	No.	Driver	Entrant	Time/Gap	Grid SR	Grid FR
1	5	(Brazil) Rafael Câmara	Trident	1:49.214	12	1
2	23	(United Kingdom) Callum Voisin	Rodin Motorsport	+0.156	11	2
3	6	(Austria) Charlie Wurz	Trident	+0.404	10	3
4	31	(Singapore) Christian Ho	DAMS Lucas Oil	+0.404	9	4
5	18	(Spain) Bruno del Pino	MP Motorsport	+0.541	8	5
6	8	(Finland) Tuukka Taponen	ART Grand Prix	+0.548	7	6
7	4	(Denmark) Noah Strømsted	Trident	+0.639	6	7
8	12	(Bulgaria) Nikola Tsolov	Campos Racing	+0.684	5	8
9	19	(France) Alessandro Giusti	MP Motorsport	+0.691	4	9
10	28	(United Kingdom) Freddie Slater	AIX Racing	+0.714	3	10
11	14	(Norway) Martinius Stenshorne	Hitech TGR	+0.764	2	11
12	15	(Austria) Joshua Dufek	Hitech TGR	+0.843	1	12
13	17	(Germany) Tim Tramnitz	MP Motorsport	+0.868	13	13
14	2	(Mexico) Noel León	Prema Racing	+0.905	14	14
15	26	(Spain) Javier Sagrera	AIX Racing	+0.940	15	15
16	1	(Italy) Brando Badoer	Prema Racing	+0.957	16	16
17	11	(Thailand) Tasanapol Inthraphuvasak	Campos Racing	+1.003	17	17
18	24	(New Zealand) Louis Sharp	Rodin Motorsport	+1.009	18	18
19	25	(Poland) Roman Bilinski	Rodin Motorsport	+1.100	19	19
20	10	(Spain) Mari Boya	Campos Racing	+1.166	20	20
21	3	(United States) Ugo Ugochukwu	Prema Racing	+1.171	21	26^{1}
22	20	(France) Théophile Naël	Van Amersfoort Racing	+1.176	22	21
23	22	(Portugal) Ivan Domingues	Van Amersfoort Racing	+1.182	23	28^{1}
24	9	(Australia) James Wharton	ART Grand Prix	+1.211	24	22
25	29	(Italy) Nicola Lacorte	DAMS Lucas Oil	+1.266	25	23
26	7	(Netherlands) Laurens van Hoepen	ART Grand Prix	+1.346	26	24
27	16	(China) Gerrard Xie	Hitech TGR	+1.369	27	25
28	30	(Peru) Matías Zagazeta	DAMS Lucas Oil	+1.410	28	27
29	27	(Italy) Nicola Marinangeli	AIX Racing	+1.555	29	29
30	21	(Mexico) Santiago Ramos	Van Amersfoort Racing	+1.579	30	30

==== Qualifying report ====
Rafael Câmara claimed pole position for the feature race, ahead of Callum Voisin and Charlie Wurz. Joshua Dufek started first for the sprint race, after claiming reverse grid pole position.

Notes:

- ^1 Ugo Ugochukwu and Ivan Domingues were both given five-place grid penalties in the feature race for causing collisions in the sprint race.

=== Sprint race ===
Pos.	No.	Driver	Team	Laps	Time/Gap	Grid	Pts.
1	12	(Bulgaria) Nikola Tsolov	Campos Racing	19	39:51.263	5	10
2	28	(United Kingdom) Freddie Slater	AIX Racing	19	+0.580	3	9 (1)
3	8	(Finland) Tuukka Taponen	ART Grand Prix	19	+1.222	7	8
4	23	(United Kingdom) Callum Voisin	Rodin Motorsport	19	+1.924	11	7
5	14	(Norway) Martinius Stenshorne	Hitech TGR	19	+2.939	2	6
6	17	(Germany) Tim Tramnitz	MP Motorsport	19	+3.543	13	5
7	19	(France) Alessandro Giusti	MP Motorsport	19	+4.246	4	4
8	31	(Singapore) Christian Ho	DAMS Lucas Oil	19	+5.078	9	3
9	6	(Austria) Charlie Wurz	Trident	19	+5.664	10	2
10	4	(Denmark) Noah Strømsted	Trident	19	+6.407	6	1
11	2	(Mexico) Noel León	Prema Racing	19	+6.796	14	
12	5	(Brazil) Rafael Câmara	Trident	19	+7.255	12	
13	9	(Australia) James Wharton	ART Grand Prix	19	+8.003	24	
14	24	(New Zealand) Louis Sharp	Rodin Motorsport	19	+8.558	18	
15	10	(Spain) Mari Boya	Campos Racing	19	+9.142	20	
16	7	(Netherlands) Laurens van Hoepen	ART Grand Prix	19	+9.781	26	
17	30	(Peru) Matías Zagazeta	DAMS Lucas Oil	19	+10.342	28	
18	11	(Thailand) Tasanapol Inthraphuvasak	Campos Racing	19	+10.751	17	
19	18	(Spain) Bruno del Pino	MP Motorsport	19	+11.171	8	
20	25	(Poland) Roman Bilinski	Rodin Motorsport	19	+11.638	19	
21	16	(China) Gerrard Xie	Hitech TGR	19	+12.446	27	
22	1	(Italy) Brando Badoer	Prema Racing	19	+13.287	16	
23	26	(Spain) Javier Sagrera	AIX Racing	19	+17.232^{1}	15	
DNF	15	(Austria) Joshua Dufek	Hitech TGR	14	Collision	1	
DNF	22	(Portugal) Ivan Domingues	Van Amersfoort Racing	13	Collision	30	
DNF	21	(Mexico) Santiago Ramos	Van Amersfoort Racing	13	Retired	30	
DNF	29	(Italy) Nicola Lacorte	DAMS Lucas Oil	12	Retired	25	
DNF	20	(France) Théophile Naël	Van Amersfoort Racing	11	Retired	22	
DNF	3	(United States) Ugo Ugochukwu	Prema Racing	3	Collision	21	
DNF	27	(Italy) Nicola Marinangeli	AIX Racing	2	Retired	29	
Fastest lap set by (United Kingdom) Freddie Slater: 1:53.383 (lap 2)

==== Sprint race report ====
After starting fifth, Nikola Tsolov won the sprint race. The race marked Freddie Slater's debut in FIA Formula 3, with Slater finishing in second and taking the fastest lap. Tuukka Taponen rounded out the podium in third.

Notes:

- ^1 Javier Sagrera originally finished 12th, but was later given a ten-second time penalty for causing a collision, dropping him down to 23rd.

=== Feature race ===
Pos.	No.	Driver	Team	Laps	Time/Gap	Grid	Pts.
1	5	(Brazil) Rafael Câmara	Trident	22	42:05.006	1	25 (2+1)
2	23	(United Kingdom) Callum Voisin	Rodin Motorsport	22	+6.211	2	18
3	17	(Germany) Tim Tramnitz	MP Motorsport	22	+7.884	13	15
4	8	(Finland) Tuukka Taponen	ART Grand Prix	22	+10.693	6	12
5	12	(Bulgaria) Nikola Tsolov	Campos Racing	22	+11.031	8	10
6	4	(Denmark) Noah Strømsted	Trident	22	+14.143	7	8
7	19	(France) Alessandro Giusti	MP Motorsport	22	+14.457	9	6
8	10	(Spain) Mari Boya	Campos Racing	22	+17.258	20	4
9	18	(Spain) Bruno del Pino	MP Motorsport	22	+18.289	5	2
10	31	(Singapore) Christian Ho	DAMS Lucas Oil	22	+18.361	4	1
11	6	(Austria) Charlie Wurz	Trident	22	+19.310	3	
12	7	(Netherlands) Laurens van Hoepen	ART Grand Prix	22	+29.307	24	
13	25	(Poland) Roman Bilinski	Rodin Motorsport	22	+30.450	19	
14	21	(Mexico) Santiago Ramos	Van Amersfoort Racing	22	+31.353	30	
15	20	(France) Théophile Naël	Van Amersfoort Racing	22	+32.424	21	
16	11	(Thailand) Tasanapol Inthraphuvasak	Campos Racing	22	+33.366^{1}	17	
17	2	(Mexico) Noel León	Prema Racing	22	+35.793	14	
18	14	(Norway) Martinius Stenshorne	Hitech TGR	22	+39.525	11	
19	22	(Portugal) Ivan Domingues	Van Amersfoort Racing	22	+39.885	28	
20	29	(Italy) Nicola Lacorte	DAMS Lucas Oil	22	+41.181	23	
21	1	(Italy) Brando Badoer	Prema Racing	22	+41.997	16	
22	15	(Austria) Joshua Dufek	Hitech TGR	22	+46.434	12	
23	24	(New Zealand) Louis Sharp	Rodin Motorsport	22	+46.989	18	
24	26	(Spain) Javier Sagrera	AIX Racing	22	+47.779^{2}	15	
25	27	(Italy) Nicola Marinangeli	AIX Racing	22	+49.536	29	
26	16	(China) Gerrard Xie	Hitech TGR	22	+50.373	25	
27	3	(United States) Ugo Ugochukwu	Prema Racing	22	+1:10.118^{3}	26	
28	9	(Australia) James Wharton	ART Grand Prix	22	+1:25.190	22	
29	30	(Peru) Matías Zagazeta	DAMS Lucas Oil	22	+1:29.943	27	
DNF	28	(United Kingdom) Freddie Slater	AIX Racing	2	Retired	10	
Fastest lap set by (Brazil) Rafael Câmara: 1:52.931 (lap 5)

==== Feature race report ====
Starting from pole, Rafael Câmara won the feature race, marking back to back wins following his Melbourne feature race victory. Callum Voisin finished in second, ahead of Tim Tramnitz in third.

Notes:

- ^1 Tasanapol Inthraphuvasak originally finished 12th, but was given a ten-second time penalty for leaving the track and gaining an advantage, dropping him to 16th
- ^2 Javier Sagrera originally finished 22nd, but was given a five-second time penalty for not respecting track limits, dropping him to 24th.
- ^3 Ugo Ugochukwu was given two five-second time penalties for not respecting track limits. The penalties did not affect his finishing position.

== Standings after the event ==
Drivers' Championship standings

	Pos.	Driver	Points
	1	(Brazil) Rafael Câmara	56
7	2	(Germany) Tim Tramnitz	30
10	3	(United Kingdom) Callum Voisin	27
1	4	(Denmark) Noah Strømsted	27
7	5	(Bulgaria) Nikola Tsolov	23

Teams' Championship standings

	Pos.	Team	Points
	1	(Italy) Trident	93
5	2	(Netherlands) MP Motorsport	42
1	3	(Spain) Campos Racing	40
2	4	(New Zealand) Rodin Motorsport	37
3	5	(Netherlands) Van Amersfoort Racing	29

- Note: Only the top five positions are included for both sets of standings.

== See also ==
- 2025 Bahrain Grand Prix
- 2025 Sakhir Formula 2 round

== Notes ==
Previous round: 2025 Melbourne Formula 3 round	FIA Formula 3 Championship; 2025 season	Next round: 2025 Imola Formula 3 round
Previous round: 2024 Sakhir Formula 3 round	Sakhir Formula 3 round	Next round: TBA
