= 2025 Spa-Francorchamps Formula 3 round =

Motor racing event

(Belgium) 2025 Spa-Francorchamps Formula 3 round
Round details
- Round 8 of 10 in the 2025 FIA Formula 3 Championship.
- Layout of Circuit de Spa-Francorchamps
- Location: Circuit de Spa-Francorchamps; Stavelot, Belgium
- Course: Permanent racing facility 7.004 km (4.352 mi)

Sprint Race
- Date: 26 July 2025
- Laps: 12
Podium
| First | (Denmark) Noah Strømsted | Trident |
| Second | (United States) Ugo Ugochukwu | Prema Racing |
| Third | (Austria) Charlie Wurz | Trident |
Fastest lap
| Driver | (Denmark) Noah Strømsted | Trident |
- Time: 2:06.800 (on lap 3)

Feature Race
- Date: 27 July 2025
- Laps: 2 (15 scheduled)
Pole position
| Driver | (United States) Brad Benavides | AIX Racing |
| Time | 2:04.253 | |
Podium
| First | Race abandoned | |
| Second | Race abandoned | |
| Third | Race abandoned | |
Fastest lap
| Driver | Race abandoned | |

The 2025 Spa-Francorchamps FIA Formula 3 round was a motor racing event held between 25 and 27 July 2025 at Circuit de Spa-Francorchamps. It was the eighth round of the 2025 FIA Formula 3 Championship and was held in support of the 2025 Belgian Grand Prix.

== Report ==
=== Driver changes ===
One change was made to the entry list: Nikita Johnson was replaced by Freddie Slater, who last raced in Bahrain.

=== Qualifying ===
Brad Benavides claimed pole position after traffic meant most of the field did not improve on their final lap, with Slater taking reverse-grid pole.

=== Sprint race ===
Slater held the lead at the start ahead of Noah Strømsted and Bruno del Pino, although del Pino soon lost third to Charlie Wurz and Ugo Ugochukwu. Strømsted used DRS to take the lead on lap two, and Ugochukwu took third from Wurz two laps later. Slater began to drop through the field and ultimately earnt four penalties for track limits offences. Strømsted took his maiden F3 victory ahead of Ugochukwu and Wurz. and Rafael Câmara finished fifth and kept his championship lead, now 28 points ahead of Nikola Tsolov as Tim Tramnitz failed to score.

=== Feature race ===
On the formation lap for the feature race, Tramnitz and Brando Badoer collided and stopped on track. The race was able to begin around 35 minutes behind schedule, but Tasanapol Inthraphuvasak spun on the first lap and was unable to continue. The race was red-flagged and not resumed as the weather continued to deteriorate. No points were awarded besides the two points Benavides earnt for pole position.

== Classification ==
=== Qualifying ===
Qualifying was held on 25 July 2025, at 19:10 local time (UTC+2).

| Pos. | No. | Driver | Entrant | Time/Gap | Grid SR | Grid FR |
|---|---|---|---|---|---|---|
| 1 | 28 | (United States) Brad Benavides | AIX Racing | 2:04.253 | 12 | 1 |
| 2 | 5 | (Brazil) Rafael Câmara | Trident | +0.106 | 11 | 2 |
| 3 | 23 | (United Kingdom) Callum Voisin | Rodin Motorsport | +0.207 | 10 | 3 |
| 4 | 25 | (Poland) Roman Bilinski | Rodin Motorsport | +0.218 | 9 | 4 |
| 5 | 14 | (Norway) Martinius Stenshorne | Hitech TGR | +0.231 | 8 | 5 |
| 6 | 3 | (United States) Ugo Ugochukwu | Prema Racing | +0.317 | 7 | 6 |
| 7 | 12 | (Bulgaria) Nikola Tsolov | Campos Racing | +0.334 | 6 | 7 |
| 8 | 11 | (Thailand) Tasanapol Inthraphuvasak | Campos Racing | +0.409 | 5 | 8 |
| 9 | 6 | (Austria) Charlie Wurz | Trident | +0.485 | 4 | 9 |
| 10 | 18 | (Spain) Bruno del Pino | MP Motorsport | +0.585 | 3 | 10 |
| 11 | 4 | (Denmark) Noah Strømsted | Trident | +0.605 | 2 | 11 |
| 12 | 15 | (United Kingdom) Freddie Slater | Hitech TGR | +0.656 | 1 | 12 |
| 13 | 17 | (Germany) Tim Tramnitz | MP Motorsport | +0.687 | 13 | 13 |
| 14 | 1 | (Italy) Brando Badoer | Prema Racing | +0.771 | 14 | 14 |
| 15 | 29 | (Italy) Nicola Lacorte | DAMS Lucas Oil | +0.781 | 15 | 15 |
| 16 | 10 | (Spain) Mari Boya | Campos Racing | +0.794 | 16 | 16 |
| 17 | 16 | (China) Gerrard Xie | Hitech TGR | +0.835 | 17 | 17 |
| 18 | 19 | (France) Alessandro Giusti | MP Motorsport | +0.912 | 18 | 18 |
| 19 | 7 | (Netherlands) Laurens van Hoepen | ART Grand Prix | +0.981 | 19 | 19 |
| 20 | 9 | (Australia) James Wharton | ART Grand Prix | +1.026 | 20 | 20 |
| 21 | 22 | (Portugal) Ivan Domingues | Van Amersfoort Racing | +1.132 | 21 | 21 |
| 22 | 31 | (Singapore) Christian Ho | DAMS Lucas Oil | +1.136 | 22 | 22 |
| 23 | 20 | (France) Théophile Naël | Van Amersfoort Racing | +1.255 | 23 | 23 |
| 24 | 24 | (New Zealand) Louis Sharp | Rodin Motorsport | +1.255 | 24 | 24 |
| 25 | 21 | (Mexico) Santiago Ramos | Van Amersfoort Racing | +1.427 | 25 | 25 |
| 26 | 30 | (Peru) Matías Zagazeta | DAMS Lucas Oil | +1.442 | 26 | 26 |
| 27 | 2 | (Mexico) Noel León | Prema Racing | +1.489 | 27 | 27 |
| 28 | 26 | (United Kingdom) James Hedley | AIX Racing | +1.679 | 28 | 28 |
| 29 | 8 | (Finland) Tuukka Taponen | ART Grand Prix | +1.712 | 29 | 29 |
| 30 | 27 | (Italy) Nicola Marinangeli | AIX Racing | +4.512 | 30 | 30 |

=== Sprint race ===
The sprint race was held on 26 July 2025, at 09:15 local time (UTC+2).

| Pos. | No. | Driver | Team | Laps | Time/Gap | Grid | Pts. |
|---|---|---|---|---|---|---|---|
| 1 | 4 | (Denmark) Noah Strømsted | Trident | 12 | 25:49.564 | 2 | 10+1 |
| 2 | 3 | (United States) Ugo Ugochukwu | Prema Racing | 12 | +6.044 | 7 | 9 |
| 3 | 6 | (Austria) Charlie Wurz | Trident | 12 | +8.081 | 4 | 8 |
| 4 | 12 | (Bulgaria) Nikola Tsolov | Campos Racing | 12 | +8.521 | 6 | 7 |
| 5 | 5 | (Brazil) Rafael Câmara | Trident | 12 | +9.546 | 11 | 6 |
| 6 | 11 | (Thailand) Tasanapol Inthraphuvasak | Campos Racing | 12 | +14.797 | 5 | 5 |
| 7 | 14 | (Norway) Martinius Stenshorne | Hitech TGR | 12 | +15.783 | 8 | 4 |
| 8 | 18 | (Spain) Bruno del Pino | MP Motorsport | 12 | +16.571 | 3 | 3 |
| 9 | 1 | (Italy) Brando Badoer | Prema Racing | 12 | +17.355 | 14 | 2 |
| 10 | 19 | (France) Alessandro Giusti | MP Motorsport | 12 | +18.330 | 18 | 1 |
| 11 | 16 | (China) Gerrard Xie | Hitech TGR | 12 | +18.989 | 17 | |
| 12 | 17 | (Germany) Tim Tramnitz | MP Motorsport | 12 | +19.487 | 13 | |
| 13 | 25 | (Poland) Roman Bilinski | Rodin Motorsport | 12 | +20.597 | 9 | |
| 14 | 10 | (Spain) Mari Boya | Campos Racing | 12 | +20.934 | 16 | |
| 15 | 2 | (Mexico) Noel León | Prema Racing | 12 | +23.684 | 27 | |
| 16 | 29 | (Italy) Nicola Lacorte | DAMS Lucas Oil | 12 | +24.739 | 15 | |
| 17 | 23 | (United Kingdom) Callum Voisin | Rodin Motorsport | 12 | +29.611 | 10 | |
| 18 | 8 | (Finland) Tuukka Taponen | ART Grand Prix | 12 | +32.256 | 29 | |
| 19 | 28 | (United States) Brad Benavides | AIX Racing | 12 | +32.530 | 12 | |
| 20 | 9 | (Australia) James Wharton | ART Grand Prix | 12 | +32.807 | 20 | |
| 21 | 21 | (Mexico) Santiago Ramos | Van Amersfoort Racing | 12 | +33.077 | 25 | |
| 22 | 20 | (France) Théophile Naël | Van Amersfoort Racing | 12 | +33.659 | 23 | |
| 23 | 7 | (Netherlands) Laurens van Hoepen | ART Grand Prix | 12 | +33.762 | 19 | |
| 24 | 26 | (United Kingdom) James Hedley | AIX Racing | 12 | +34.697 | 28 | |
| 25 | 24 | (New Zealand) Louis Sharp | Rodin Motorsport | 12 | +36.817 | 24 | |
| 26 | 15 | (United Kingdom) Freddie Slater | Hitech TGR | 12 | +38.001 | 1 | |
| 27 | 27 | (Italy) Nicola Marinangeli | AIX Racing | 12 | +38.782 | 30 | |
| 28 | 31 | (Singapore) Christian Ho | DAMS Lucas Oil | 12 | +42.668 | 22 | |
| 29 | 22 | (Portugal) Ivan Domingues | Van Amersfoort Racing | 12 | +45.313 | 21 | |
| DNF | 30 | (Peru) Matías Zagazeta | DAMS Lucas Oil | 8 | Retired | 26 | |
Fastest lap: (Denmark) Noah Strømsted (2:06.800 on lap 3)

Notes:

- ^1Mari Boya, Théophile Naël, Ivan Domingues and Freddie Slater all received penalties for track limits: five, five, ten and twenty second respectively.

=== Feature race ===
The feature race was held on 27 July 2025, at 08:30 local time (UTC+2). No official classification was released for the race as it was red-flagged on lap two and not restarted due to poor weather.

== Standings after the event ==
Drivers' Championship standings

| | Pos. | Driver | Points |
|---|---|---|---|
| | 1 | (Brazil) Rafael Câmara | 126 |
| 1 | 2 | (Bulgaria) Nikola Tsolov | 98 |
| 1 | 3 | (Germany) Tim Tramnitz | 93 |
| | 4 | (Spain) Mari Boya | 85 |
| | 5 | (Norway) Martinius Stenshorne | 80 |

Teams' Championship standings

| | Pos. | Team | Points |
|---|---|---|---|
| 1 | 1 | (Italy) Trident | 232 |
| 1 | 2 | (Spain) Campos Racing | 221 |
| | 3 | (Netherlands) MP Motorsport | 164 |
| | 4 | (Netherlands) Van Amersfoort Racing | 124 |
| | 5 | (France) ART Grand Prix | 119 |

Note: Only the top five positions are included for both sets of standings.

== See also ==
- 2025 Belgian Grand Prix
- 2025 Spa-Francorchamps Formula 2 round

| Previous round: 2025 Silverstone Formula 3 round | FIA Formula 3 Championship; 2025 season | Next round: 2025 Budapest Formula 3 round |
| Previous round: 2024 Spa-Francorchamps Formula 3 round | Spa-Francorchamps Formula 3 round | Next round: 2026 Spa-Francorchamps Formula 3 round |
