= 2025 Imola Formula 3 round =

Third round of the 2025 FIA Formula 3 season

(Italy) 2025 Imola Formula 3 round
Round details
- Round 3 of 10 in the 2025 FIA Formula 3 Championship.
- Layout of the Autodromo Internazionale Enzo e Dino Ferrari
- Location: Autodromo Internazionale Enzo e Dino Ferrari; Imola, Emilia-Romagna, Italy
- Course: Permanent racing facility 4.909 km (3.050 mi)

Sprint Race
- Date: 17 May 2025
- Laps: 18
Podium
First	(Germany) Tim Tramnitz	MP Motorsport
Second	(Spain) Bruno del Pino	MP Motorsport
Third	(Bulgaria) Nikola Tsolov	Campos Racing
Fastest lap
Driver	(Denmark) Noah Strømsted	Trident
- Time: 1:34:581 (on lap 18)

Feature Race
- Date: 18 May 2025
- Laps: 22
Pole position
Driver	(Brazil) Rafael Câmara	Trident
Time	1:32:206	
Podium
First	(Mexico) Santiago Ramos	Van Amersfoort Racing
Second	(Denmark) Noah Strømsted	Trident
Third	(Brazil) Rafael Câmara	Trident
Fastest lap
Driver	(Denmark) Noah Strømsted	Trident
- Time: 1:34.242 (on lap 6)

The 2025 Imola FIA Formula 3 round was a motor racing event held between 16 and 18 May 2025 at the Autodromo Internazionale Enzo e Dino Ferrari in Imola, Emilia-Romagna, Italy. It was the third round of the 2025 FIA Formula 3 Championship and was held in support of the 2025 Emilia Romagna Grand Prix.

Rafael Câmara took his third consecutive pole position in qualifying, the first to achieve the feat in FIA Formula 3. Tim Tramnitz won the feature race ahead of Bruno del Pino and Nikola Tsolov, taking MP Motorsport's first 1-2 finish in the series. In the feature race, Santiago Ramos took his second win of the season, ahead of Noah Strømsted and Câmara. Câmara remained in the championship lead, 21 points ahead of Strømsted.

== Classification ==
=== Qualifying ===
Pos.	No.	Driver	Entrant	Time/Gap	Grid SR	Grid FR
1	5	(Brazil) Rafael Câmara	Trident	1:32.206	12	1
2	21	(Mexico) Santiago Ramos	Van Amersfoort Racing	+0.236	11	2
3	4	(Denmark) Noah Strømsted	Trident	+0.244	10	3
4	8	(Finland) Tuukka Taponen	ART Grand Prix	+0.327	9	4
5	24	(New Zealand) Louis Sharp	Rodin Motorsport	+0.359	8	5
6	25	(Poland) Roman Bilinski	Rodin Motorsport	+0.373	7	6
7	3	(United States) Ugo Ugochukwu	Prema Racing	+0.381	6	7
8	2	(Mexico) Noel León	Prema Racing	+0.406	5	8
9	12	(Bulgaria) Nikola Tsolov	Campos Racing	+0.430	4	9
10	10	(Spain) Mari Boya	Campos Racing	+0.504	3	10
11	17	(Germany) Tim Tramnitz	MP Motorsport	+0.572	2	11
12	18	(Spain) Bruno del Pino	MP Motorsport	+0.574	1	12
13	19	(France) Alessandro Giusti	MP Motorsport	+0.586	13	13
14	28	(United States) Brad Benavides	AIX Racing	+0.673	14	14
15	1	(Italy) Brando Badoer	Prema Racing	+0.688	15	15
16	14	(Norway) Martinius Stenshorne	Hitech TGR	+0.722	16	16
17	7	(Netherlands) Laurens van Hoepen	ART Grand Prix	+0.773	17	17
18	29	(Italy) Nicola Lacorte	DAMS Lucas Oil	+0.836	18	18
19	15	(Austria) Joshua Dufek	Hitech TGR	+0.881	19	19
20	9	(Australia) James Wharton	ART Grand Prix	+0.890	20	20
21	20	(France) Théophile Naël	Van Amersfoort Racing	+0.971	21	21
22	23	(United Kingdom) Callum Voisin	Rodin Motorsport	+1.014	22	22
23	26	(United Kingdom) James Hedley	AIX Racing	+1.075	23	23
24	22	(Portugal) Ivan Domingues	Van Amersfoort Racing	+1.164	24	24
25	31	(Singapore) Christian Ho	DAMS Lucas Oil	+1.269	25	25
26	30	(Peru) Matías Zagazeta	DAMS Lucas Oil	+1.300	26	26
27	16	(China) Gerrard Xie	Hitech TGR	+1.388	27	27
28	6	(Austria) Charlie Wurz	Trident	+1.656	28	28
29	27	(Italy) Nicola Marinangeli	AIX Racing	+1.715	29	29
107% time: 1:38.660 (+6.454)
—	11	(Thailand) Tasanapol Inthraphuvasak	Campos Racing	+33.325^{1}	30	30

Notes:

- ^1 Tasanapol Inthraphuvasak had his fastest lap time deleted for causing a red flag, dropping him outside of the 107% cut-off. He was permitted to race by the stewards.

=== Sprint race ===
Pos.	No.	Driver	Team	Laps	Time/Gap	Grid	Pts.
1	17	(Germany) Tim Tramnitz	MP Motorsport	18	33:26.298	2	10
2	18	(Spain) Bruno del Pino	MP Motorsport	18	+0.782	1	9
3	12	(Bulgaria) Nikola Tsolov	Campos Racing	18	+1.187	4	8
4	24	(New Zealand) Louis Sharp	Rodin Motorsport	18	+2.088	8	7
5	25	(Poland) Roman Bilinski	Rodin Motorsport	18	+3.328	7	6
6	4	(Denmark) Noah Strømsted	Trident	18	+4.257	10	5 (1)
7	8	(Finland) Tuukka Taponen	ART Grand Prix	18	+6.966	9	4
8	3	(United States) Ugo Ugochukwu	Prema Racing	18	+8.206	6	3
9	2	(Mexico) Noel León	Prema Racing	18	+8.502	5	2
10	19	(France) Alessandro Giusti	MP Motorsport	18	+8.829	13	1
11	5	(Brazil) Rafael Câmara	Trident	18	+9.298	12	
12	28	(United States) Brad Benavides	AIX Racing	18	+10.577	14	
13	14	(Norway) Martinius Stenshorne	Hitech TGR	18	+11.014	16	
14	15	(Austria) Joshua Dufek	Hitech TGR	18	+11.578	19	
15	29	(Italy) Nicola Lacorte	DAMS Lucas Oil	18	+12.656	18	
16	1	(Italy) Brando Badoer	Prema Racing	18	+16.172	15	
17	7	(Netherlands) Laurens van Hoepen	ART Grand Prix	18	+16.386	17	
18	26	(United Kingdom) James Hedley	AIX Racing	18	+16.850	23	
19	11	(Thailand) Tasanapol Inthraphuvasak	Campos Racing	18	+17.178	30	
20	20	(France) Théophile Naël	Van Amersfoort Racing	18	+17.335	21	
21	31	(Singapore) Christian Ho	DAMS Lucas Oil	18	+17.746	25	
22	9	(Australia) James Wharton	ART Grand Prix	18	+18.059	20	
23	6	(Austria) Charlie Wurz	Trident	18	+18.302	28	
24	16	(China) Gerrard Xie	Hitech TGR	18	+18.597	27	
25	22	(Portugal) Ivan Domingues	Van Amersfoort Racing	18	+19.342	24	
26	23	(United Kingdom) Callum Voisin	Rodin Motorsport	18	+28.870^{1}	22	
27	21	(Mexico) Santiago Ramos	Van Amersfoort Racing	17	+1 lap	11	
DNF	10	(Spain) Mari Boya	Campos Racing	9	Retired	3	
DNF	30	(Peru) Matías Zagazeta	DAMS Lucas Oil	8	Retired	26	
DNF	27	(Italy) Nicola Marinangeli	AIX Racing	3	Lost Wheel	29	
Fastest lap set by (Denmark) Noah Strømsted: 1:34.581 (lap 18)

Notes:

- Callum Voisin was given a ten-second penalty for forcing another driver off the track, demoting him from 25th to 26th.

=== Feature race ===
Pos.	No.	Driver	Team	Laps	Time/Gap	Grid	Pts.
1	21	(Mexico) Santiago Ramos	Van Amersfoort Racing	22	35:28.558	2	25
2	4	(Denmark) Noah Strømsted	Trident	22	+0.277	3	18 (1)
3	5	(Brazil) Rafael Câmara	Trident	22	+6.838	1	15 (2)
4	8	(Finland) Tuukka Taponen	ART Grand Prix	22	+8.540	4	12
5	10	(Spain) Mari Boya	Campos Racing	22	+13.713	10	10
6	17	(Germany) Tim Tramnitz	MP Motorsport	22	+14.887	11	8
7	19	(France) Alessandro Giusti	MP Motorsport	22	+15.268	13	6
8	25	(Poland) Roman Bilinski	Rodin Motorsport	22	+16.315	6	4
9	12	(Bulgaria) Nikola Tsolov	Campos Racing	22	+16.727	9	2
10	7	(Netherlands) Laurens van Hoepen	ART Grand Prix	22	+17.829	17	1
11	14	(Norway) Martinius Stenshorne	Hitech TGR	22	+20.516	16	
12	24	(New Zealand) Louis Sharp	Rodin Motorsport	22	+21.667	5	
13	9	(Australia) James Wharton	ART Grand Prix	22	+26.453	20	
14	3	(United States) Ugo Ugochukwu	Prema Racing	22	+27.074	7	
15	15	(Austria) Joshua Dufek	Hitech TGR	22	+27.345	19	
16	6	(Austria) Charlie Wurz	Trident	22	+27.853	28	
17	11	(Thailand) Tasanapol Inthraphuvasak	Campos Racing	22	+29.857	30	
18	23	(United Kingdom) Callum Voisin	Rodin Motorsport	22	+34.266	22	
19	1	(Italy) Brando Badoer	Prema Racing	22	+35.516	15	
20	16	(China) Gerrard Xie	Hitech TGR	22	+35.885	27	
21	31	(Singapore) Christian Ho	DAMS Lucas Oil	22	+36.307	25	
22	30	(Peru) Matías Zagazeta	DAMS Lucas Oil	22	+37.379	26	
23	26	(United Kingdom) James Hedley	AIX Racing	22	+37.894	23	
24	28	(United States) Brad Benavides	AIX Racing	22	+41.212^{1}	14	
25	29	(Italy) Nicola Lacorte	DAMS Lucas Oil	22	+42.526^{2}	18	
26	20	(France) Théophile Naël	Van Amersfoort Racing	22	+1:09.330	21	
27	18	(Spain) Bruno del Pino	MP Motorsport	22	+1:13.930	12	
28	2	(Mexico) Noel León	Prema Racing	21	+1 lap	8	
DNF	22	(Portugal) Ivan Domingues	Van Amersfoort Racing	10	Collision/Spun Off	24	
DNF	27	(Italy) Nicola Marinangeli	AIX Racing	6	Retired	29	
Fastest lap set by (Denmark) Noah Strømsted: 1:34.141 (lap 6)

Notes:

- ^1 Brad Benavides was given a ten-second penalty for causing a collision, demoting him from 18th to 24th.
- ^2 Nicola Lacorte was given a ten-second penalty for leaving the track and gaining an advantage, demoting him from 19th to 25th.

== Standings after the event ==
Drivers' Championship standings

	Pos.	Driver	Points
	1	(Brazil) Rafael Câmara	73
2	2	(Denmark) Noah Strømsted	52
1	3	(Germany) Tim Tramnitz	48
3	4	(Finland) Tuukka Taponen	36
6	5	(Mexico) Santiago Ramos	35

Teams' Championship standings

	Pos.	Team	Points
	1	(Italy) Trident	135
	2	(Netherlands) MP Motorsport	76
	3	(Spain) Campos Racing	60
1	4	(Netherlands) Van Amersfoort Racing	54
1	5	(New Zealand) Rodin Motorsport	54

Note: Only the top five positions are included for both sets of standings.

== See also ==
- 2025 Emilia Romagna Grand Prix
- 2025 Imola Formula 2 round

Previous round: 2025 Sakhir Formula 3 round	FIA Formula 3 Championship; 2025 season	Next round: 2025 Monte Carlo Formula 3 round
Previous round: 2024 Imola Formula 3 round	Imola Formula 3 round	Next round: None
