= Noah Strømsted =

Danish racing driver (born 2007)

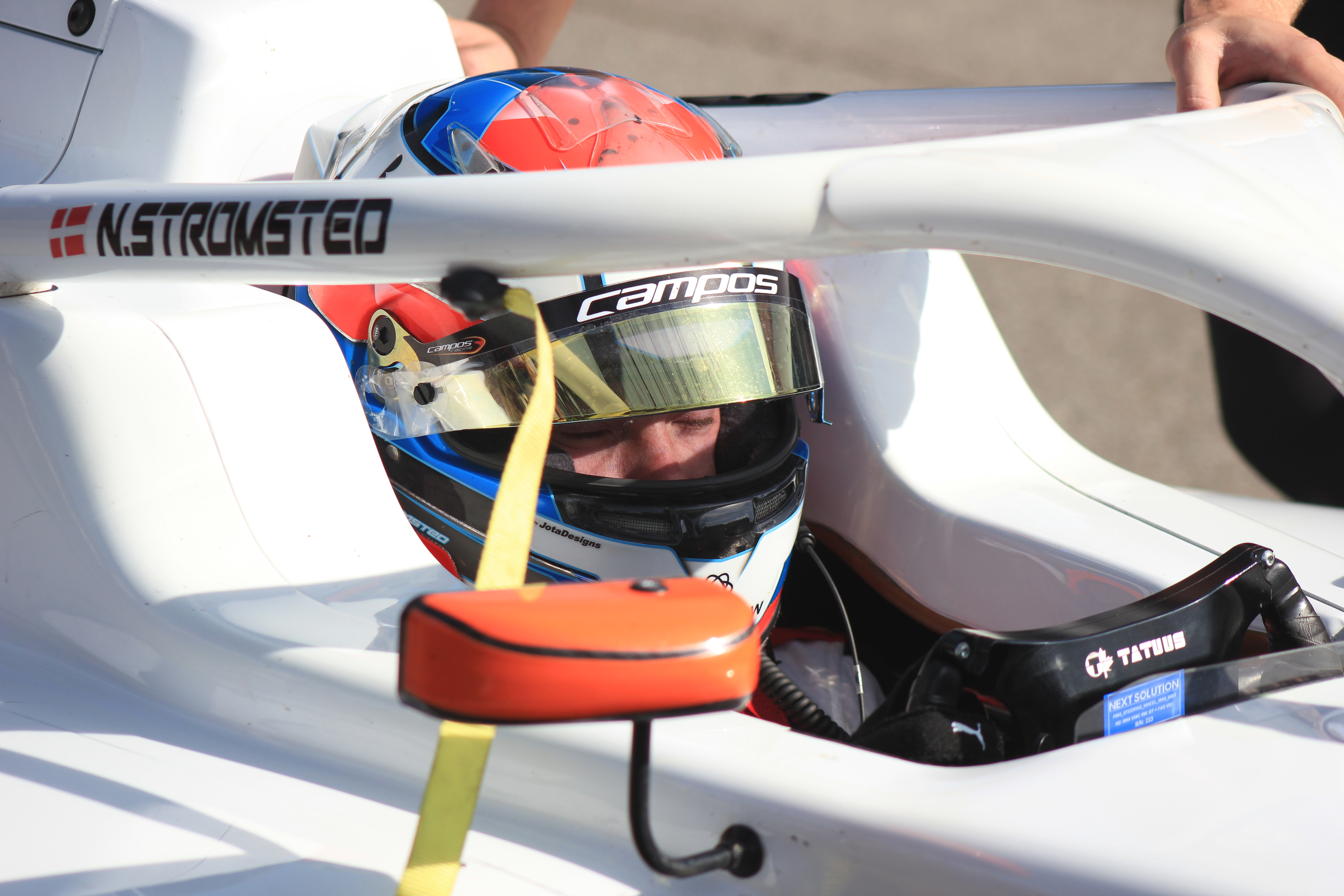
- Strømsted in 2023
- Born: Noah Malling Strømsted; 29 July 2007 (age 19); Copenhagen, Denmark
- Nationality: (Denmark) Danish

FIA Formula 3 Championship career
- Debut season: 2024
- Car number: 4
- Former teams: Campos, Trident
- Starts: 40
- Wins: 2
- Podiums: 4
- Poles: 0
- Fastest laps: 4
- Best finish: 6th in 2025

Previous series
- 2024–2026; 2024; 2023–2024; 2023; 2022–2023; 2021: FIA Formula 3; FR Middle East; FR European; F4 UAE; F4 Spanish; F4 Danish
- Statistics up to date as of 6 October 2026.

Noah Malling Strømsted (Danish pronunciation: [ˈnoːæ ˈstʁœmˀ.sd̥ɛð̩]; born 29 July 2007) is a Danish racing driver who is set to compete in the FIA Formula 2 Championship for Invicta Racing.

Born and raised in Copenhagen, Strømsted began his racing career in the F4 Danish Championship in 2021, where he finished runner-up aged 15. After two campaigns in F4 Spanish, he progressed to Formula Regional European, claiming several podiums and finishing sixth overall as a rookie in 2024. He debuted in FIA Formula 3 that year with Campos and signed with Trident for 2025, where he joined the Mercedes Junior Team and achieved his maiden victory.

== Career ==
=== Formula 4 ===
==== 2021 ====
Having completed an extensive testing programme with no prior career in kart racing, Strømsted joined the F4 Danish Championship at the third round, driving for FSP Racing. He took victory on his debut and won another race that weekend. This meant he became one of the youngest ever race winners in Formula 4, at 14 years old. He then won again at the next event at Padborg Park, although a crash in Race 2 meant that he couldn't partake in the final race. Strømsted finished his season off in dominant fashion, winning the remaining six races and placing himself second in the standings, despite having missed the opening two rounds.

==== 2022 ====
The following year, Strømsted stepped up to Spanish F4 with Campos Racing at the penultimate round of the campaign in Navarra, having been forced to wait until he turned 15 to compete in the series. His weekend started off with an eighth place in Race 1 and fifth in Race 2, before Strømsted would go on to score pole for the main race on Sunday, where a bad start and a subsequent collision brought an end to his race.

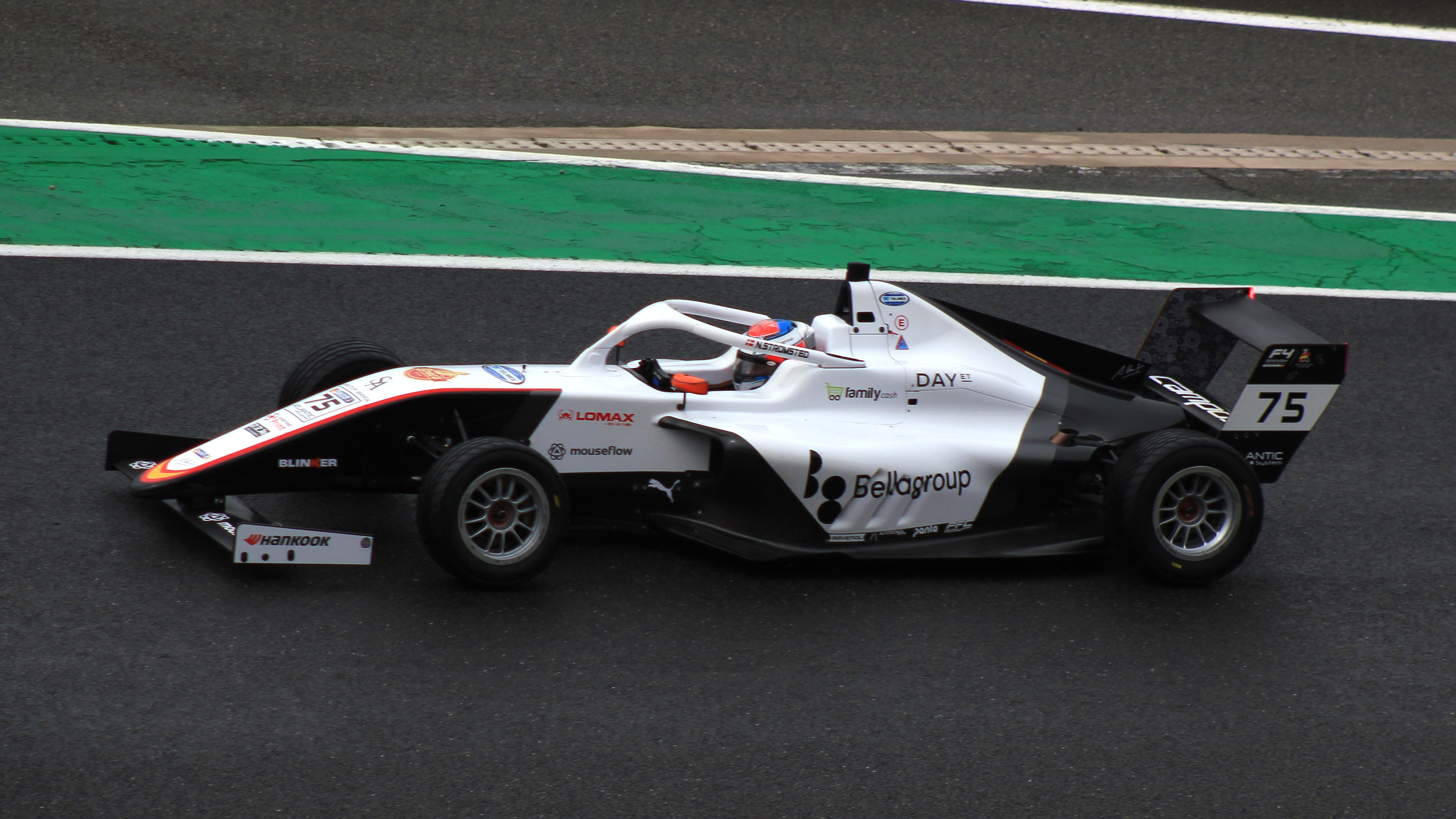
Strømsted racing at Spa-Francorchamps during the 2023 F4 Spanish Championship.

==== 2023 ====
In preparation for his main campaign, Strømsted partook in the 2023 Formula 4 UAE Championship with PHM Racing. With one third place podium, he ended ninth in the standings.

Strømsted would remain with Campos Racing for the full 2023 F4 Spanish Championship. He scored his first podium in Aragón, before a double podium came at the Circuito de Navarra. With more consistent points finishes, Strømsted was classified seventh in the championship, collecting 135 points and three podiums.

=== Formula Regional ===
==== 2023 ====
In Monza, Strømsted was announced to join the 2023 Formula Regional European Championship with RPM. Competing as a guest driver, he would finish a high of sixth in his first race.

==== 2024 ====
Early in the year, Strømsted participated in one round of the 2024 Formula Regional Middle East Championship with Saintéloc Racing. He finished 16th twice and retired in the other, placing 29th in the standings.

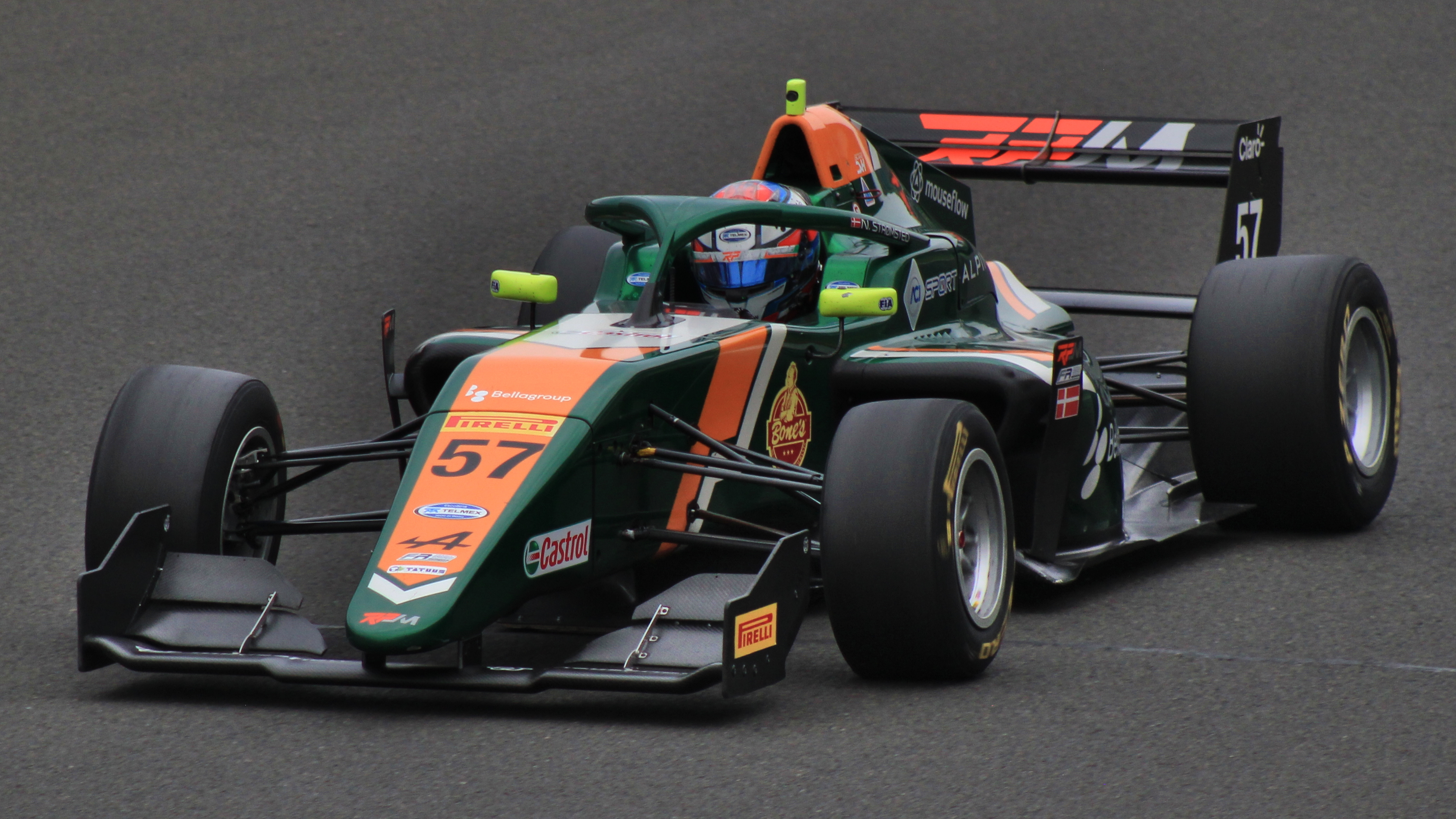
Strømsted racing at the Hungaroring during the 2024 Formula Regional European Championship

For his main campaign, Strømsted would remain with RPM for the Formula Regional European Championship. He started with a pointless weekend in Hockenheim, before scoring a first podium with second place in Spa-Francorchamps. With regular points finishes, Strømsted took three more second-placed podiums in Paul Ricard, Imola and the Austria. This included a first pole position during the latter round. With 121 points and four podiums, Strømsted finished seventh in the standings, and won the rookie title over nearest rookie Evan Giltaire.

=== FIA Formula 3 Championship ===
==== 2024 ====
Strømsted would make his FIA Formula 3 debut with Campos Racing during the Monza season finale, replacing Oliver Goethe who himself replaced Formula One-bound Franco Colapinto at MP Motorsport in Formula 2. He had a solid debut, finishing 17th and 23rd in the races.

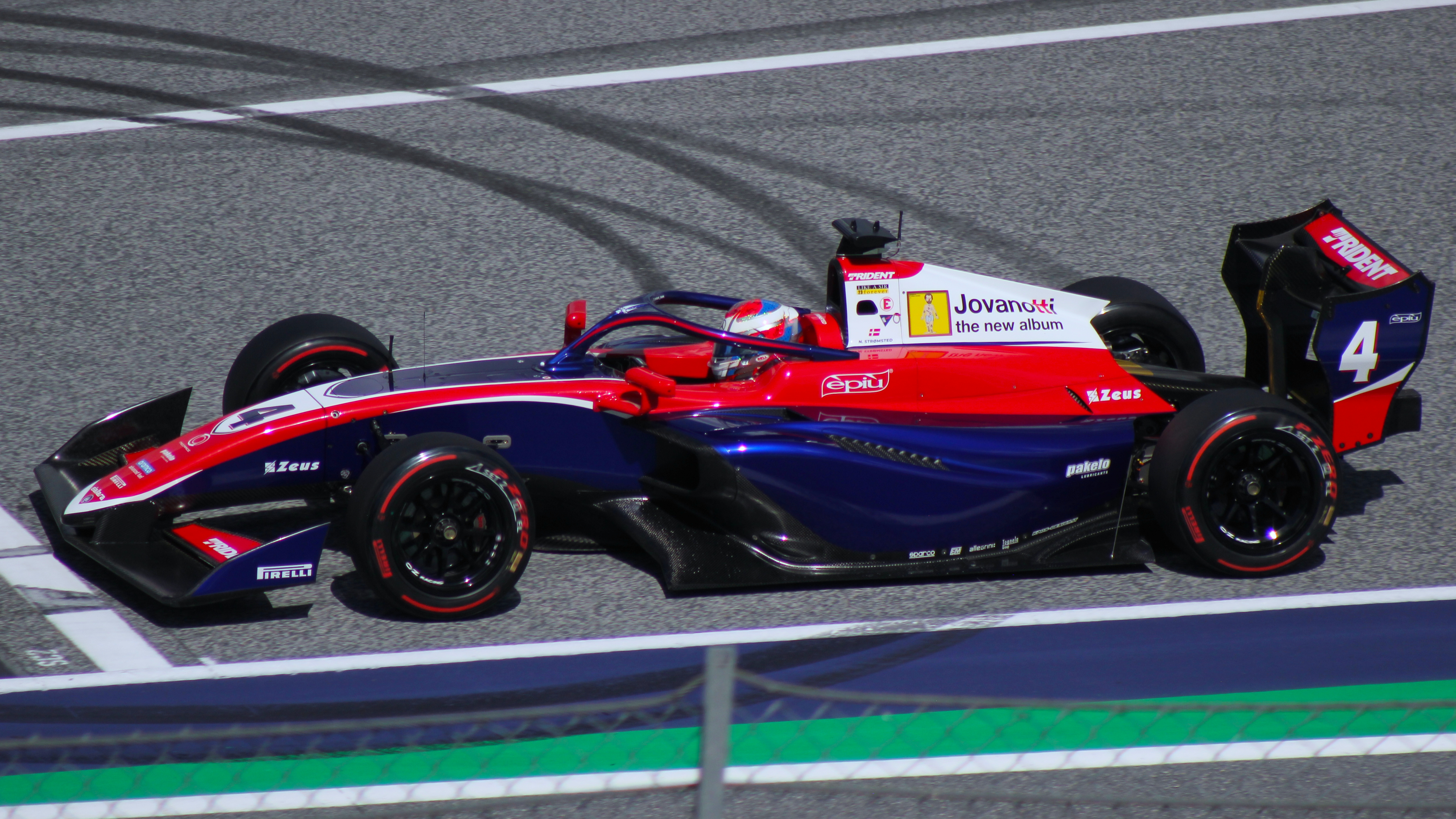
Strømsted driving at the Red Bull Ring during the 2025 Spielberg Formula 3 round

==== 2025 ====
Strømsted was promoted to FIA Formula 3 full-time for 2025, joining Trident, partnering Charlie Wurz and 2024 FRECA champion Rafael Câmara. He began the season with a front row in the Melbourne. After retiring from the sprint due to front wing damage, he maintained his position in a wet feature race to take his first podium in the series. A solid round in Bahrain followed where he picked up points with tenth and sixth. His qualifying form continued in Imola with third, He made up positions in the sprint and finished in sixth, and despite a slow start, almost won the feature race as he missed out by a few tenths to Santiago Ramos. However, he endured a tough round in Monaco, failing to score points as he qualified out of the top-12. In the Barcelona sprint race, Strømsted benefitted from the opening lap chaos to move up to second; he was chasing his first win but retired with four laps to go due to a hydraulics issue. Despite this, he salvaged an eighth place in the feature race.

Qualifying third in Austria, Strømsted's sprint was once again impacted by front wing damage, and struggled with race pace finishing down in seventh place. After a pointless outing in Silverstone, Strømsted earned his big break in the Spa-Francorchamps sprint race, passing polesitter Freddie Slater early on to take his first F3 win by a dominant six seconds. He again failed to score in Budapest, but rounded out the season with a double points finish in Monza, having made up positions from 20th. Strømsted finished his rookie season sixth in the standings with one win, three podiums and 84 points.

Strømsted also raced in the Macau Grand Prix with the team, he finished the main race in seventh place after avoiding trouble throughout the weekend.

==== 2026 ====
Strømsted stayed with Trident for the 2026 season, where he partners FRECA graduates Freddie Slater and Matteo De Palo.

=== FIA Formula 2 Championship ===
Strømsted will move up to Formula 2 in 2027 with Invicta Racing, continuing alongside old Formula 3 teammate Freddie Slater.

=== Formula One ===
Strømsted was a member of the Mercedes Junior Team in 2025.

== Personal life ==
Strømsted currently resides just outside of Copenhagen in Denmark.

== Racing record ==
=== Racing career summary ===
Season	Series	Team	Races	Wins	Poles	F/Laps	Podiums	Points	Position
2021	F4 Danish Championship	FSP Racing	11	9	2	9	10	243	**2nd**
2022	F4 Spanish Championship	Campos Racing	6	0	1	0	0	0	NC†
2023	Formula 4 UAE Championship	PHM Racing	15	0	0	0	1	55	9th
2023	F4 Spanish Championship	Campos Racing	20	0	0	1	3	135	7th
2023	Formula Regional European Championship	RPM	4	0	0	0	0	0	NC†
2024	Formula Regional Middle East Championship	Saintéloc Racing	3	0	0	0	0	0	29th
2024	Formula Regional European Championship	RPM	20	0	1	3	4	121	6th
2024	GT Winter Series - Cup3	Sunder Motorworks	?	?	?	?	?	?	?
2024	FIA Formula 3 Championship	Campos Racing	2	0	0	0	0	0	32nd
2025	FIA Formula 3 Championship	Trident	19	1	0	4	3	84	6th
2025	Macau Grand Prix	Trident	1	0	0	0	0	—N/a	7th
2026	FIA Formula 3 Championship	Trident	19	1	0	0	1	65	10th
2027	FIA Formula 2 Championship	Invicta Racing	0	0	0	0	0	0	TBD

^{†} As Strømsted was a guest driver, he was ineligible for championship points.
* Season still in progress.

=== Complete F4 Danish Championship results ===
(key) (Races in bold indicate pole position) (Races in italics indicate fastest lap)

Year	Team	1	2	3	4	5	6	7	8	9	10	11	12	13	14	15	16	17	18	DC	Points
2021	FSP Racing	PAD1; 1	PAD1; 2	PAD1; 3	PAD2; 1	PAD2; 2	PAD2; 3	**JYL1**; **1**; 1	JYL1; 2; 2	JYL1; 3; 1	PAD3; 1; 1	PAD3; 2 Ret	PAD3; 3 DNS	DJU; 1; 1	DJU; 2; 1	DJU; 3; 1	**JYL2**; **1**; 1	JYL2; 2; 1	JYL2; 3; 1	2nd	243

=== Complete F4 Spanish Championship results ===
(key) (Races in bold indicate pole position) (Races in italics indicate fastest lap)

Year	Team	1	2	3	4	5	6	7	8	9	10	11	12	13	14	15	16	17	18	19	20	21	Pos	Points
2022	Campos Racing	ALG; 1	ALG; 2	ALG; 3	JER; 1	JER; 2	JER; 3	CRT; 1	CRT; 2	CRT; 3	SPA; 1	SPA; 2	SPA; 3	ARA; 1	ARA; 2	ARA; 3	NAV; 1; 8	NAV; 2; 5	**NAV**; **3** Ret	CAT; 1; 6	CAT; 2; 5	CAT; 3; 30†	NC†	0
2023	Campos Racing	SPA; 1; 4	SPA; 2; 6	SPA; 3 DNS	ARA; 1; 3	ARA; 2; 6	ARA; 3; 4	NAV; 1; 3	NAV; 2; 8	NAV; 3; 2	JER; 1 Ret	JER; 2; 5	JER; 3; 9	EST; 1; 12	EST; 2; 6	EST; 3; 13	CRT; 1; 20	CRT; 2 Ret	CRT; 3; 5	CAT; 1; 5	CAT; 2; 5	CAT; 3; 8	7th	135

^{†} As Strømsted was a guest driver, he was ineligible for championship points.

=== Complete Formula 4 UAE Championship results ===
(key) (Races in bold indicate pole position) (Races in italics indicate fastest lap)

Year	Team	1	2	3	4	5	6	7	8	9	10	11	12	13	14	15	Pos	Points
2023	PHM Racing	DUB1; 1; 36	DUB1; 2; 7	DUB1; 3; 30	KMT1; 1; 8	KMT1; 2; 6	KMT1; 3; 15	KMT2; 1; 5	KMT2; 2; 12	KMT2; 3; 37†	DUB2; 1 Ret	DUB2; 2; 3	DUB2; 3; 23	YMC; 1; 5	YMC; 2; 30	YMC; 3; 9	9th	55

=== Complete Formula Regional European Championship results ===
(key) (Races in bold indicate pole position) (Races in italics indicate fastest lap)

Year	Team	1	2	3	4	5	6	7	8	9	10	11	12	13	14	15	16	17	18	19	20	DC	Points
2023	RPM	IMO; 1	IMO; 2	CAT; 1	CAT; 2	HUN; 1	HUN; 2	SPA; 1	SPA; 2	MUG; 1	MUG; 2	LEC; 1	LEC; 2	RBR; 1	RBR; 2	MNZ; 1 Ret	MNZ; 2; 6	ZAN; 1	ZAN; 2	HOC; 1; 14	HOC; 2; 13	NC†	0
2024	RPM	HOC; 1; 11	HOC; 2; 12	SPA; 1; 4	SPA; 2; 2	ZAN; 1; 14	ZAN; 2; 4	HUN; 1 Ret	HUN; 2; 15	MUG; 1; 9	MUG; 2; 9	LEC; 1 Ret	LEC; 2; 2	IMO; 1; 11	IMO; 2; 2	RBR; 1; 9	**RBR**; **2**; 2	CAT; 1; 5	CAT; 2; 6	MNZ; 1; 28†	MNZ; 2; 10	6th	121

^{†} As Strømsted was a guest driver, he was ineligible to score points.

=== Complete Formula Regional Middle East Championship results ===
(key) (Races in bold indicate pole position) (Races in italics indicate fastest lap)

Year	Entrant	1	2	3	4	5	6	7	8	9	10	11	12	13	14	15	DC	Points
2024	Saintéloc Racing	YMC1; 1	YMC1; 2	YMC1; 3	YMC2; 1	YMC2; 2	YMC2; 3	DUB1; 1; 16	DUB1; 2; 16	DUB1; 3 Ret	YMC3; 1	YMC3; 2	YMC3; 3	DUB2; 1	DUB2; 2	DUB2; 3	29th	0

=== Complete FIA Formula 3 Championship results ===
(key) (Races in bold indicate pole position) (Races in italics indicate fastest lap)

Year	Entrant	1	2	3	4	5	6	7	8	9	10	11	12	13	14	15	16	17	18	19	20	DC	Points
2024	Campos Racing	BHR; SPR	BHR; FEA	MEL; SPR	MEL; FEA	IMO; SPR	IMO; FEA	MON; SPR	MON; FEA	CAT; SPR	CAT; FEA	RBR; SPR	RBR; FEA	SIL; SPR	SIL; FEA	HUN; SPR	HUN; FEA	SPA; SPR	SPA; FEA	MNZ; SPR; 17	MNZ; FEA; 23†	32nd	0
2025	Trident	MEL; SPR; Ret	MEL; FEA; 2	BHR; SPR; 10	BHR; FEA; 6	IMO; SPR; 6	IMO; FEA; 2	MON; SPR; Ret	MON; FEA; 18	CAT; SPR; Ret	CAT; FEA; 8	RBR; SPR; 20	RBR; FEA; 7	SIL; SPR; 13	SIL; FEA; 28	SPA; SPR; 1	SPA; FEA; C	HUN; SPR; 17	HUN; FEA; 12	MNZ; SPR; 8	MNZ; FEA; 6	6th	84
2026	Trident	MEL; SPR; 4	MEL; FEA; 23	MON; SPR; 5	MON; FEA; 10	CAT; SPR; 11	CAT; FEA; 11	RBR; SPR; 5	RBR; FEA; 1	SIL; SPR; 5	SIL; FEA; 5	SPA; SPR; 10	SPA; FEA; 10	HUN; SPR; 20	HUN; FEA; 12	MNZ; SPR; 15	MNZ; FEA; 7	MAD; SPR; 20	MAD; FEA1; 16	MAD; FEA2; 21		10th	65

=== Complete Macau Grand Prix results ===
Year	Team	Car	Qualifying	Quali Race	Main race
2025	(Italy) Trident	Tatuus F3 T-318	10th	9th	7th

=== Complete FIA Formula 2 Championship results ===
(key) (Races in bold indicate pole position) (Races in italics indicate fastest lap)

Year	Entrant	1	2	3	4	5	6	7	8	9	10	11	12	13	14	15	16	17	18	19	20	21	22	23	24	25	26	27	28	DC	Points
2027	Invicta Racing	BHR; SPR	BHR; FEA	JED; SPR	JED; FEA	MEL; SPR	MEL; FEA	MTL; SPR	MTL; FEA	MON; SPR	MON; FEA	SIL; SPR	SIL; FEA	RBR; SPR	RBR; FEA	MNZ; SPR	MNZ; FEA	MAD; SPR	MAD; FEA	BAK; SPR	BAK; FEA	IST; SPR	IST; FEA	MXC; SPR	MXC; FEA	LSL; SPR	LSL; FEA	YMC; SPR	YMC; FEA	TBD	TBD
