= James Hedley =

British racing driver (born 2003)

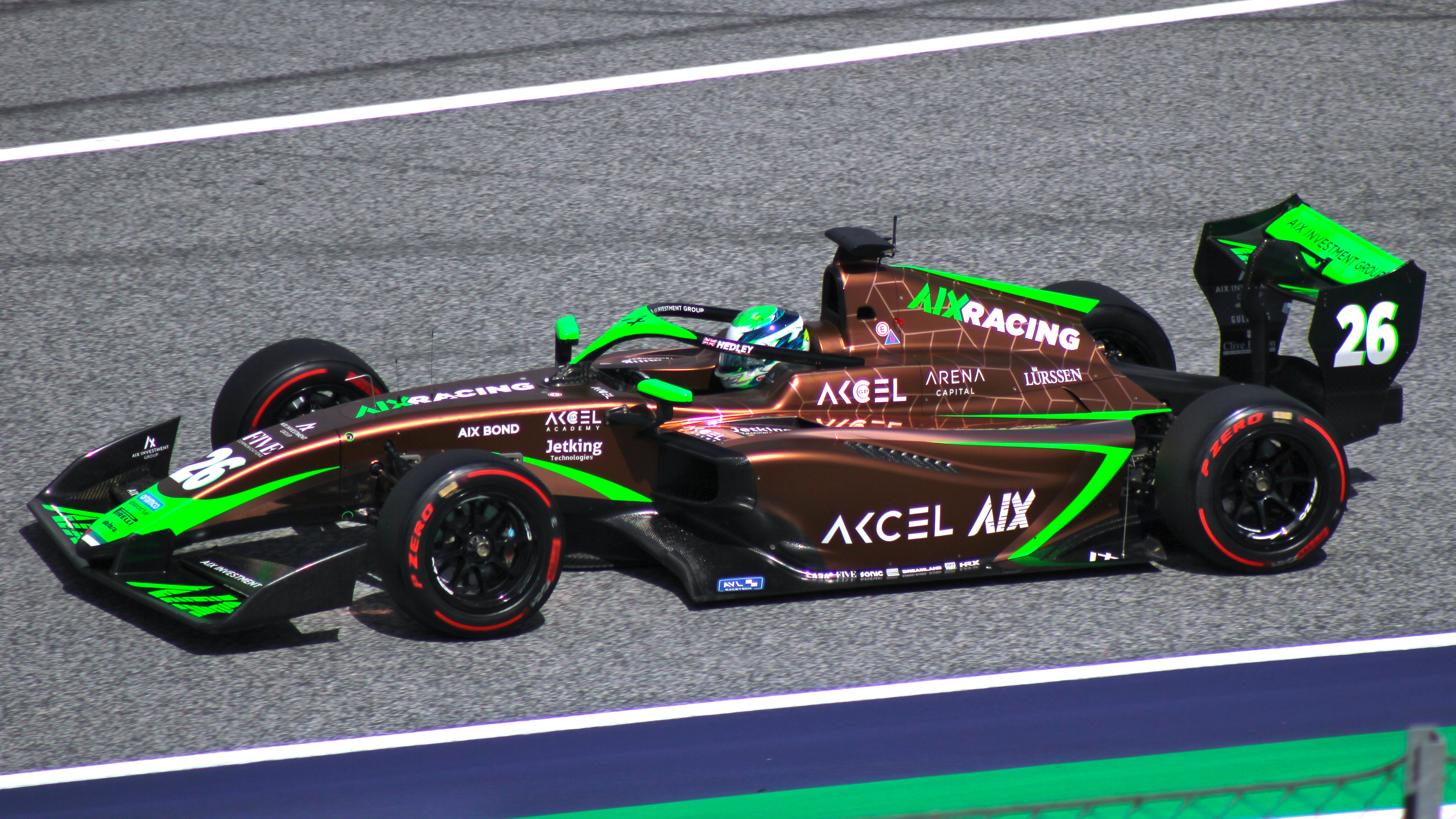
- Hedley driving the Dallara F3 2025 during the 2025 Spielberg Formula 3 round
- Nationality: (United Kingdom) British
- Born: James Aston Hedley; 1 September 2003 (age 23) Poole, Dorset, England

FIA Formula 3 Championship career
- Debut season: 2024
- Car number: 21
- Former teams: Jenzer Motorsport, AIX Racing, Van Amersfoort Racing
- Starts: 14
- Wins: 0
- Podiums: 0
- Poles: 0
- Fastest laps: 0
- Best finish: 28th in 2025

Previous series
- 2021–2024 2024, 2026 2024 2020–2021 2017–2019: GB3 Championship; Eurocup-3; FIA Formula 3 Championship; F4 British Championship; Ginetta Junior Championship

Championship titles
- 2019: Ginetta Junior Championship

James Aston Hedley (born 1 September 2003) is a British racing driver who last competed in Eurocup-3, driving for Double R Racing.

Heley has previously competed in the FIA Formula 3 Championship for Van Amersfoort Racing, having previously raced for Jenzer Motorsport and AIX Racing, and in the 2024 GB3 Championship with VRD by Arden. He is part of the BRDC Rising Star Programme.

== Career ==
=== Karting ===
Hedley started karting at the age of eleven. In 2016, he became the Honda Cadet London Easter Champion.

=== Ginetta Junior Championship ===
Hedley made his car racing debut with Elite Motorsport in final two rounds of the 2017 Ginetta Junior Championship. For the 2018 Ginetta Junior Championship, he remained with the team finished the season in eighth after scoring two podiums. In 2019, he returned for another season in the Ginetta Junior Championship. This time he went on to become champion ahead of Zak O'Sullivan with seven wins to his name.

=== F4 British Championship ===
In 2020, Hedley joined JHR Developments in the F4 British Championship to make his single-seater racing debut. He took four wins throughout the season and finished the championship fifth in the standings.

In 2021, Hedley returned to the F4 British Championship with Fortec Motorsport. In the first half of the season Hedley took four wins. Ahead of the sixth round at Thruxton Circuit he split with Fortec Motorsport and continued in the championship with Carlin instead. He once again finished fifth in the overall championship standings.

=== GB3 Championship ===
In October 2021, Hedley also joined his old Ginetta Junior-team Elite Motorsport to compete in the final round of the GB3 Championship at Donington Park.

Hedley then started the 2022 GB3 Championship with Elite Motorsport. He took his only podiums finish of the season in the fourth round at Snetterton Circuit. Ahead of the fifth round at Circuit de Spa-Francorchamps, he switched teams to join JHR Developments. Hedley finished 17th in the championship standings.

For the 2023 GB3 Championship, Hedley joined Arden VRD. Throughout the season, he took two wins at Oulton Park and Snetterton Circuit. He came sixth in the standings.

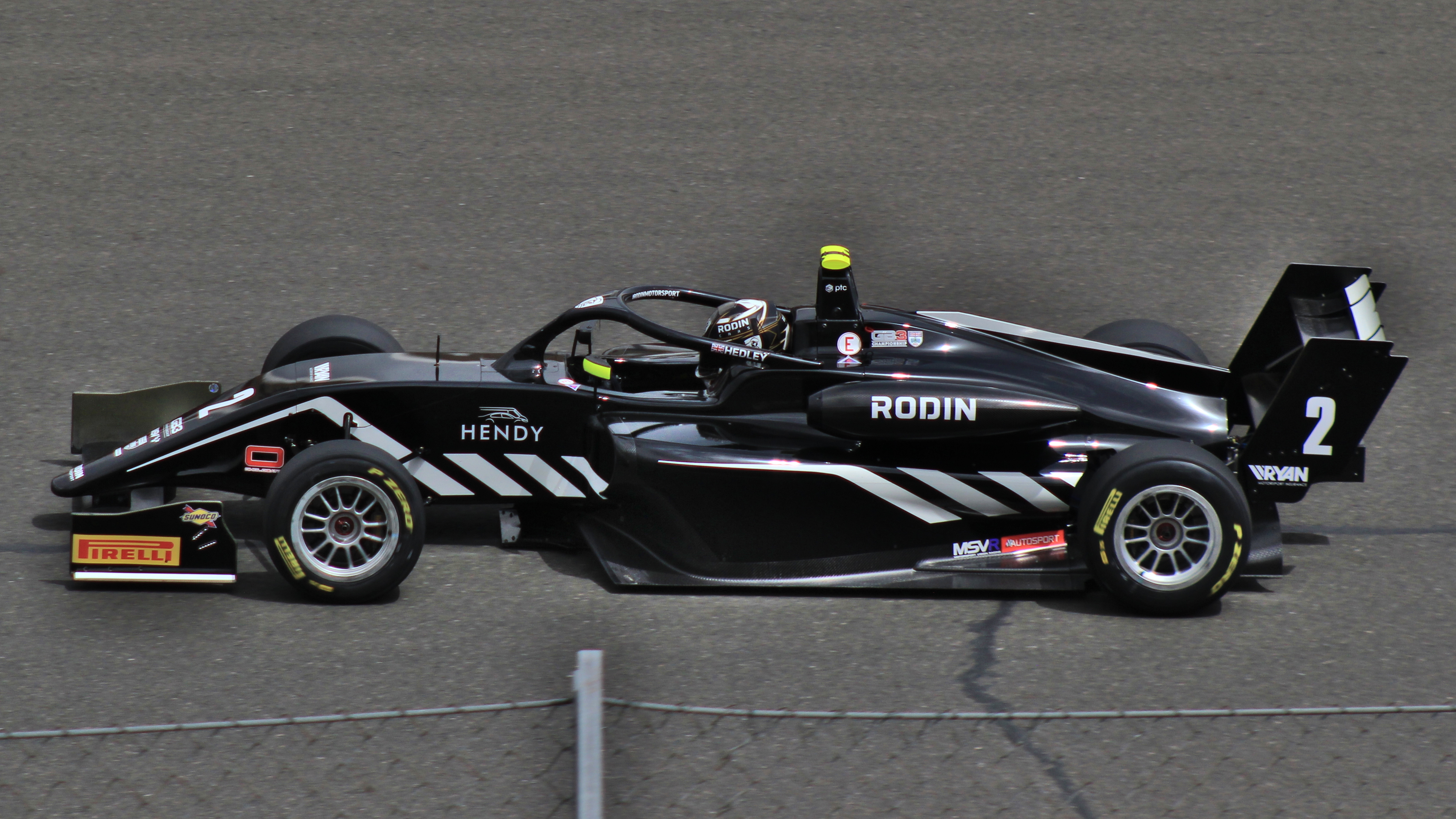
Hedley driving at the Hungaroring during the 2024 GB3 Championship

Hedley remained with VRD by Arden for the opening two rounds of the 2024 GB3 Championship, acting as a replacement for Nikita Johnson, who was yet to reach the minimum age requirement to compete in the GB3 Championship.

=== Formula Regional ===
==== 2023 ====
Following the 2023 Formula Regional season, Hedley participated in multiple post-season tests with RPM. These tests never amounted to a race seat.

==== 2024 ====
Hedley was linked to the Monolite Racing team during the 2024 pre-season and was due to test and race with them until they withdrew from the championship shortly before the season's start.

==== 2025 ====
Hedley joined PHM Racing from round 3 onwards, in the Formula Regional Middle East Championship.

==== 2026 ====
After a year of absence from racing, Hedley made a one-off appearance in Eurocup-3 with Double R Racing during the Silverstone round.

=== FIA Formula 3 Championship ===
==== 2024 ====
In May 2024, Hedley made his FIA Formula 3 debut following a late call-up to race in the Monaco round, replacing Matías Zagazeta who was recovering from appendicitis.

==== 2025 ====
Hedley made his debut in the 2025 FIA Formula 3 season with AIX Racing, replacing Javier Sagrera for round three from Imola and onwards. During the opening lap of the Monaco sprint race, he was involved in a collision with Ivan Domingues which inflicted a hand injury; this caused him to miss the feature race. The injury also caused him to miss the following round in Barcelona, and he was replaced by José Garfias. Hedley was replaced for the final round in Monza by Fernando Barrichello. A few days later however, he would return to the championship with Van Amersfoort Racing, replacing Santiago Ramos.

=== Super Formula ===
In December 2024, Hedley partook in a Super Formula test at the Suzuka Circuit.

== Racing record ==
=== Racing career summary ===
Season	Series	Team	Races	Wins	Poles	F/Laps	Podiums	Points	Position
2017	Ginetta Junior Championship	Elite Motorsport	6	0	0	0	0	60	22nd
2017	Ginetta Junior Winter Series	Elite Motorsport	4	0	0	0	0	65	7th
2018	Ginetta Junior Championship	Elite Motorsport	26	0	3	2	2	356	8th
2018	Ginetta Junior Winter Championship	Elite Motorsport	3	2	2	1	2	95	**1st**
2019	Ginetta Junior Championship	Elite Motorsport	26	7	11	12	18	680	**1st**
2020	F4 British Championship	JHR Developments	25	4	4	7	7	249	5th
2021	F4 British Championship	Fortec Motorsport	14	4	2	1	6	226	5th
2021	F4 British Championship	Carlin	15	0	0	0	2	226	5th
2021	GB3 Championship	Elite Motorsport	3	0	0	0	0	23	26th
2022	GB3 Championship	Elite Motorsport	12	0	0	0	1	156	17th
2022	GB3 Championship	JHR Developments	9	0	0	0	0	156	17th
2023	GB3 Championship	Arden VRD	23	2	0	0	3	347	6th
2024	GB3 Championship	VRD by Arden	5	0	0	0	0	151	15th
2024	GB3 Championship	Rodin Motorsport	6	0	0	0	2	151	15th
2024	GB3 Championship	Chris Dittmann Racing	3	0	0	0	0	151	15th
2024	FIA Formula 3 Championship	Jenzer Motorsport	2	0	0	0	0	0	34th
2024	Eurocup-3	Saintéloc Racing	2	0	0	0	0	0	NC†
2025	Formula Regional Middle East Championship	AKCEL GP / PHM Racing	6	0	0	0	0	0	25th
2025	FIA Formula 3 Championship	AIX Racing	10	0	0	0	0	7	28th
2025	FIA Formula 3 Championship	Van Amersfoort Racing	2	0	0	0	0	7	28th
2026	Eurocup-3	Double R Racing	5	0	0	0	0	0	26th

* Season still in progress.

=== Complete Ginetta Junior Championship results ===
(key) (Races in bold indicate pole position) (Races in italics indicate fastest lap)

Year	Team	1	2	3	4	5	6	7	8	9	10	11	12	13	14	15	16	17	18	19	20	21	22	23	24	25	26	27	DC	Points
2017	Elite Motorsport	BHI; 1	BHI; 2	DON; 1	DON; 2	DON; 3	THR1; 1	THR1; 2	OUL; 1	OUL; 2	CRO; 1	CRO; 2	CRO; 3	SNE; 1	SNE; 2	SNE; 3	KNO; 1	KNO; 2	ROC; 1	ROC; 2	ROC; 3	SIL; 1; 17	SIL; 2; 16	SIL; 3; 10	BHGP; 1; 10	BHGP; 2; 10	BHGP; 3; 6		22nd	60
2018	Elite Motorsport	BHI; 1; 7	BHI; 2; 10	DON; 1; 8	DON; 2; 10	DON; 3; 5	THR1; 1; 6	THR1; 2; 2	OUL; 1; 5	OUL; 2; 12	CRO; 1; 6	CRO; 2; 11	CRO; 3; 10	SNE; 1; 13	SNE; 2; 7	SNE; 3; 6	**ROC**; **1**; 5	ROC; 2 Ret	ROC; 3; 12	**KNO**; **1**; 7	KNO; 2; 4	SIL; 1; 2	SIL; 2; 8	SIL; 3; 18	**BHGP**; **1**; 5	BHGP; 2; 10	BHGP; 3; 18		8th	356
2019	Elite Motorsport	BHI; 1; 3	BHI; 2; 2	DON; 1; 1	DON; 2; 2	DON; 3; 1	**THR1**; **1**; 4	**THR1**; **2**; 1	CRO; 1 C	**CRO**; **2**; 2	OUL; 1; 2	OUL; 2; 2	SNE; 1; 6	**SNE**; **2**; 2	SNE; 3; 3	SNE; 4; 2	**THR2**; **1**; 1	**THR2**; **2**; 3	THR2; 3 Ret	KNO; 1; 1	KNO; 2; 1	**KNO**; **3**; 3	**SIL**; **1**; 17	**SIL**; **2**; 4	SIL; 3; 4	**BHGP**; **1**; 1	**BHGP**; **2**; 5	BHGP; 3; 5	1st	680

=== Complete F4 British Championship results ===
(key) (Races in bold indicate pole position) (Races in italics indicate fastest lap)

Year	Team	1	2	3	4	5	6	7	8	9	10	11	12	13	14	15	16	17	18	19	20	21	22	23	24	25	26	27	28	29	30	DC	Points
2020	JHR Developments	**DON**; **1**; 5	DON; 2 Ret	DON; 3; 1	BHGP; 1 DNS	BHGP; 2; 9	BHGP; 3; 8	**OUL**; **1**; 4	OUL; 2; 4	OUL; 3; 2	KNO; 1 Ret	KNO; 2; 5	KNO; 3; 5	**THR**; **1**; 1	THR; 2; 1	**THR**; **3**; 1	SIL; 1; 5	SIL; 2; 2	SIL; 3 Ret	CRO; 1; 8	CRO; 2; 5	SNE; 1; 9	SNE; 2; 7	SNE; 3; 3	BHI; 1; 8	BHI; 2; 5	BHI; 3; 9					5th	249
2021	Fortec Motorsport	THR1; 1; 1	THR1; 2; 1	THR1; 3; 3	SNE; 1; 2	SNE; 2; 11	SNE; 3; 4	BHI; 1; 15	BHI; 2; 1	BHI; 3; 5	**OUL**; **1**; 1	OUL; 2; 12^{7}	**OUL**; **3**; 6	KNO; 1; 10	KNO; 2 DNS	KNO; 3; 11																5th	226
2021	Carlin																THR2; 1 Ret	THR2; 2; 3^{3}	THR2; 3; 8	CRO; 1; 12	CRO; 2; 5	CRO; 3; 12	SIL; 1; 15	SIL; 2; 6	SIL; 3 Ret	DON; 1; 7	DON; 2; 4^{8}	DON; 3; 8	BHGP; 1; 12	BHGP; 2; 2^{4}	BHGP; 3; 13	5th	226

=== Complete GB3 Championship results ===
(key) (Races in bold indicate pole position) (Races in italics indicate fastest lap)

Year	Team	1	2	3	4	5	6	7	8	9	10	11	12	13	14	15	16	17	18	19	20	21	22	23	24	DC	Points
2021	Elite Motorsport	BRH; 1	BRH; 2	BRH; 3	SIL1; 1	SIL1; 2	SIL1; 3	DON1; 1	DON1; 2	DON1; 3	SPA; 1	SPA; 2	SPA; 3	SNE; 1	SNE; 2	SNE; 3	SIL2; 1	SIL2; 2	SIL2; 3	OUL; 1	OUL; 2	OUL; 3	DON2; 1; 10	DON2; 2; 12	DON2; 3; 13	26th	23
2022	Elite Motorsport	OUL; 1; 13	OUL; 2; 10	OUL; 3; 12	SIL1; 1; 5	SIL1; 2; 7	SIL1; 3; 18	DON1; 1; 6	DON1; 2; 4	DON1; 3; 14	SNE; 1; 16	SNE; 2; 14	SNE; 3; 3^{2}													17th	156
2022	JHR Developments													SPA; 1 Ret	SPA; 2; 13	SPA; 3; 14	SIL2; 1; 15	SIL2; 2 DSQ	SIL2; 3 Ret	BRH; 1; 11	BRH; 2; 16	BRH; 3 Ret	DON2; 1 WD	DON2; 2 WD	DON2; 3 WD	17th	156
2023	Arden VRD	OUL; 1; 4	OUL; 2; 1	OUL; 3; 11^{10}	SIL1; 1; 9	SIL1; 2; 20	SIL1; 3; 10^{4}	SPA; 1; 8	SPA; 2; 6	SPA; 3; 4^{6}	SNE; 1; 1	SNE; 2; 3	SNE; 3; 13^{6}	SIL2; 1; 11	SIL2; 2; 11	SIL2; 3 C	BRH; 1; 4	BRH; 2; 8	BRH; 3; 13^{8}	ZAN; 1 Ret	ZAN; 2; 4	ZAN; 3 Ret	DON; 1; 4	DON; 2; 6	DON; 3; 11^{7}	6th	347
2024	VRD by Arden	OUL; 1; 17	OUL; 2 Ret	OUL; 3; 15^{6}	SIL1; 1; 8	SIL1; 2; 7	SIL1; 3 C	SPA; 1	SPA; 2	SPA; 3																15th	151
2024	Rodin Motorsport										HUN; 1; 4	HUN; 2; 8	HUN; 3; 6^{2}	ZAN; 1; 3	ZAN; 2; 2	ZAN; 3; 11	SIL2; 1	SIL2; 2	SIL2; 3	DON; 1	DON; 2	DON; 3				15th	151
2024	Chris Dittmann Racing																						BRH; 1; 18	BRH; 2 Ret	BRH; 3; 12^{1}	15th	151

=== Complete FIA Formula 3 Championship results ===
(key) (Races in bold indicate pole position) (Races in italics indicate fastest lap)

Year	Entrant	1	2	3	4	5	6	7	8	9	10	11	12	13	14	15	16	17	18	19	20	DC	Points
2024	Jenzer Motorsport	BHR; SPR	BHR; FEA	MEL; SPR	MEL; FEA	IMO; SPR	IMO; FEA	MON; SPR; 20	MON; FEA; 22	CAT; SPR	CAT; FEA	RBR; SPR	RBR; FEA	SIL; SPR	SIL; FEA	HUN; SPR	HUN; FEA	SPA; SPR	SPA; FEA	MNZ; SPR	MNZ; FEA	34th	0
2025	AIX Racing	MEL; SPR	MEL; FEA	BHR; SPR	BHR; FEA	IMO; SPR; 18	IMO; FEA; 23	MON; SPR; Ret	MON; FEA; WD	CAT; SPR	CAT; FEA	RBR; SPR; DSQ	RBR; FEA; 26	SIL; SPR; 26	SIL; FEA; 27	SPA; SPR; 24	SPA; FEA; C	HUN; SPR; 4	HUN; FEA; 22			28th	7
2025	Van Amersfoort Racing																			MNZ; SPR; 24	MNZ; FEA; 17	28th	7

=== Complete Eurocup-3 results ===
(key) (Races in bold indicate pole position) (Races in italics indicate fastest lap)

Year	Team	1	2	3	4	5	6	7	8	9	10	11	12	13	14	15	16	17	18	19	DC	Points
2024	Saintéloc Racing	SPA; 1	SPA; 2	RBR; 1	RBR; 2	POR; 1	POR; 2	POR; 3	LEC; 1	LEC; 2	ZAN; 1	ZAN; 2	ARA; 1	ARA; 2	JER; 1; 17	JER; 2; 11	CAT; 1	CAT; 2			NC†	0
2026	Double R Racing	LEC; 1	LEC; SR	LEC; 2	POR; 1	POR; 2	IMO; 1	IMO; SR	IMO; 2	MNZ; 1	MNZ; 2	SIL; 1; 21	SIL; 2; 11	JER; 1; 23	JER; SR; Ret	JER; 2 Ret	HUN; 1	HUN; 2	CAT; 1	CAT; 2	26th	0

† As Hedley was a guest driver, he was ineligible to score points.

=== Complete Formula Regional Middle East Championship results ===
(key) (Races in bold indicate pole position; races in italics indicate fastest lap)

Year	Team	1	2	3	4	5	6	7	8	9	10	11	12	13	14	15	DC	Points
2025	AKCEL GP / PHM Racing	YMC1; 1	YMC1; 2	YMC1; 3	YMC2; 1	YMC2; 2	YMC2; 3	DUB; 1; 18	DUB; 2; 16	DUB; 3; 13	YMC3; 1; 15	YMC3; 2 Ret	YMC3; 3; 13	LUS; 1	LUS; 2	LUS; 3	25th	0
