= 2024 Monte Carlo Formula 3 round =

Fourth round of the 2024 Formula 3 season

(Monaco) 2024 Monte Carlo Formula 3 round
Round details
- Round 4 of 10 in the 2024 FIA Formula 3 Championship.
- Location: Circuit de Monaco; Monte Carlo, Monaco
- Course: Street circuit 3.337 km (2.074 mi)

Sprint race
- Date: 25 May 2024
- Laps: 23
Podium
First	(Bulgaria) Nikola Tsolov	ART Grand Prix
Second	(Germany) Tim Tramnitz	MP Motorsport
Third	(Netherlands) Laurens van Hoepen	ART Grand Prix
Fastest lap
Driver	(Sweden) Dino Beganovic	Prema Racing
- Time: 1:24.919 (on lap 7)

Feature Race
- Date: 26 May 2024
- Laps: 27
Pole position
Driver	(Italy) Gabriele Minì	Prema Racing
Time	1:23.942	
Podium
First	(Italy) Gabriele Minì	Prema Racing
Second	(Australia) Christian Mansell	ART Grand Prix
Third	(United Kingdom) Luke Browning	Hitech Pulse-Eight
Fastest lap
Driver	(Norway) Martinius Stenshorne	Hitech Pulse-Eight
- Time: 1:24.773 (on lap 9)

The 2024 Monte Carlo FIA Formula 3 round was a motor racing event held between 23 and 26 May 2024 at the Circuit de Monaco. It was the fourth round of the 2024 FIA Formula 3 Championship and was held in support of the 2024 Monaco Grand Prix.

== Driver changes ==
Prior to the weekend, Jenzer Motorsport announced GB3 Championship race winner James Hedley as a replacement driver for Matías Zagazeta, after the Peruvian driver was ruled out of this round due to appendicitis.

== Classification ==
=== Summary ===
Gabriele Minì set the fastest qualifying time at the Circuit de Monaco for the second consecutive year, with Christian Mansell setting the fastest time in the second group. Nikola Tsolov started the sprint race from pole position and maintained the place, whilst Tim Tramnitz claimed second place from Laurens van Hoepen at the first corner. Mansell and Arvid Lindblad then collided at the Casino Square corner, causing their retirements and eliminating three other drivers who were caught up in the accident. The race was red-flagged to clear the track. Tsolov held his position when racing resumed, and through another safety car restart when Kacper Sztuka retired, to claim his first victory in the category.

Minì led the start of the feature race ahead of Mansell and Browning. Racing was interrupted by three safety cars; firstly when Piotr Wiśnicki collided with Charlie Wurz, secondly when Sami Meguetounif crashed whilst attempting to avoid the collided cars of Tsolov and Noel León, and thirdly when Van Hoepen hit the wall attempting to overtake Joseph Loake. The top three drivers maintained their places through each restart and Minì took his first win of the season. His victory promoted him to the lead of the Drivers' Championship, four points ahead of Browning.

=== Qualifying ===
==== Group A ====
Qualifying for Group A was held on 24 May 2024, at 11:05 local time (UTC+2).

Pos.	No.	Driver	Team	Time	Gap	Grid
1	2	(Italy) Gabriele Minì	Prema Racing	1:23.942	–	1
2	14	(United Kingdom) Luke Browning	Hitech Pulse-Eight	1:24.230	+0.288	3
3	4	(Italy) Leonardo Fornaroli	Trident	1:24.295	+0.353	5
4	12	(Spain) Mari Boya	Campos Racing	1:24.787	+0.845	7
5	20	(Mexico) Noel León	Van Amersfoort Racing	1:24.801	+0.859	9
6	24	(Netherlands) Laurens van Hoepen	ART Grand Prix	1:24.931	+0.989	11
7	10	(Germany) Oliver Goethe	Campos Racing	1:25.061	+1.119	13
8	8	(Poland) Kacper Sztuka	MP Motorsport	1:25.557	+1.615	15
9	6	(Mexico) Santiago Ramos	Trident	1:25.590	+1.648	17
10	22	(Australia) Tommy Smith	Van Amersfoort Racing	1:25.730	+1.788	19
11	30	(Poland) Piotr Wiśnicki	Rodin Motorsport	1:25.842	+1.900	21
12	18	(United States) Max Esterson	Jenzer Motorsport	1:25.995	+2.053	23
13	28	(Austria) Joshua Dufek	AIX Racing	1:26.124	+2.182	25
14	26	(Thailand) Tasanapol Inthraphuvasak	AIX Racing	1:26.316	+2.374	27
15	16	(United Kingdom) Cian Shields	Hitech Pulse-Eight	1:26.362	+2.420	29
107% time: 1:29.817 (+5.875)

==== Group B ====
Qualifying for Group B was held on 24 May 2024, at 11:29 local time (UTC+2).

Pos.	No.	Driver	Team	Time	Gap	Grid
1	23	(Australia) Christian Mansell	ART Grand Prix	1:24.921	–	2
2	3	(United Kingdom) Arvid Lindblad	Prema Racing	1:24.940	+0.019	4
3	1	(Sweden) Dino Beganovic	Prema Racing	1:25.078	+0.157	6
4	31	(United Kingdom) Joseph Loake	Rodin Motorsport	1:25.443	+0.522	8
5	7	(Germany) Tim Tramnitz	MP Motorsport	1:25.524	+0.603	10
6	25	(Bulgaria) Nikola Tsolov	ART Grand Prix	1:25.548	+0.627	12
7	5	(France) Sami Meguetounif	Trident	1:25.574	+0.653	14
8	27	(Italy) Nikita Bedrin (Note: Bedrin is a Russian driver competing under an Italian licence.)	AIX Racing	1:25.644	+0.723	16
9	21	(Germany) Sophia Flörsch	Van Amersfoort Racing	1:25.674	+0.753	18
10	29	(United Kingdom) Callum Voisin	Rodin Motorsport	1:25.992	+1.071	20
11	17	(Austria) Charlie Wurz	Jenzer Motorsport	1:26.049	+1.128	22
12	11	(Colombia) Sebastián Montoya	Campos Racing	1:26.069	+1.148	24
13	9	(Republic of Ireland) Alex Dunne	MP Motorsport	1:26.102	+1.181	26
14	15	(Norway) Martinius Stenshorne	Hitech Pulse-Eight	1:26.594	+1.673	28
107% time: 1:30.865 (+5.944)
—	19	(United Kingdom) James Hedley	Jenzer Motorsport	2:00.304	+35.383	30^{1}

Notes:

- ^1 – James Hedley failed to set a time within the 107%-rule, but was later given permission by the stewards to start both races from the back of the grid.

=== Sprint Race ===
The Sprint race was held on 25 May 2024, at 10:45 local time (UTC+2).

Pos.	No.	Driver	Team	Laps	Time/Gap	Grid	Pts.
1	25	(Bulgaria) Nikola Tsolov	ART Grand Prix	23	59:09.511	1	10
2	7	(Germany) Tim Tramnitz	MP Motorsport	23	+4.328	3	9
3	24	(Netherlands) Laurens van Hoepen	ART Grand Prix	23	+5.173	2	8
4	20	(Mexico) Noel León	Van Amersfoort Racing	23	+5.310	4	7
5	31	(United Kingdom) Joseph Loake	Rodin Motorsport	23	+6.489	5	6
6	12	(Spain) Mari Boya	Campos Racing	23	+6.891	6	5
7	1	(Sweden) Dino Beganovic	Prema Racing	23	+7.732	7	4 (1)
8	14	(United Kingdom) Luke Browning	Hitech Pulse-Eight	23	+12.658	10	3
9	4	(Italy) Leonardo Fornaroli	Trident	23	+12.971	8	2
10	10	(Germany) Oliver Goethe	Campos Racing	23	+14.964	13	1
11	2	(Italy) Gabriele Minì	Prema Racing	23	+15.337	12	
12	29	(United Kingdom) Callum Voisin	Rodin Motorsport	23	+19.472	20	
13	22	(Australia) Tommy Smith	Van Amersfoort Racing	23	+20.161	19	
14	18	(United States) Max Esterson	Jenzer Motorsport	23	+24.341	23	
15	6	(Mexico) Santiago Ramos	Trident	23	+24.747	17	
16	15	(Norway) Martinius Stenshorne	Hitech Pulse-Eight	23	+25.093	28	
17	26	(Thailand) Tasanapol Inthraphuvasak	AIX Racing	23	+27.444	27	
18	11	(Colombia) Sebastián Montoya	Campos Racing	23	+28.335	24	
19	17	(Austria) Charlie Wurz	Jenzer Motorsport	23	+29.068	22	
20	19	(United Kingdom) James Hedley	Jenzer Motorsport	23	+43.344^{1}	30	
21	30	(Poland) Piotr Wiśnicki	Rodin Motorsport	23	+46.393	21	
22^{2}	5	(France) Sami Meguetounif	Trident	20	+3 laps	14	
DNF	27	(Italy) Nikita Bedrin	AIX Racing	15	Withdrew	16	
DNF	21	(Germany) Sophia Flörsch	Van Amersfoort Racing	13	Collision damage	18	
DNF	8	(Poland) Kacper Sztuka	MP Motorsport	12	Collision damage	15	
DNF	3	(United Kingdom) Arvid Lindblad	Prema Racing	0	Collision	9	
DNF	23	(Australia) Christian Mansell	ART Grand Prix	0	Collision	11	
DNF	28	(Austria) Joshua Dufek	AIX Racing	0	Collision	25	
DNF	9	(Republic of Ireland) Alex Dunne	MP Motorsport	0	Collision	26	
DNF	16	(United Kingdom) Cian Shields	Hitech Pulse-Eight	0	Collision	29	
Fastest lap set by (Sweden) Dino Beganovic: 1:24.919 (lap 7)

Notes:

- ^1 – James Hedley received a five-second time penalty post-race for failing to stay above the minimum time delta during the Safety Car procedure. However, his final position was not affected by the penalty.
- ^2 – Sami Meguetounif retired from the race, but was classified as he completed over 90% of the race distance.

=== Feature Race ===
The Feature race was held on 26 May 2024, at 08:00 local time (UTC+2).

Pos.	No.	Driver	Team	Laps	Time/Gap	Grid	Pts.
1	2	(Italy) Gabriele Minì	Prema Racing	27	44:15.883	1	25 (2)
2	23	(Australia) Christian Mansell	ART Grand Prix	27	+0.802	2	18
3	14	(United Kingdom) Luke Browning	Hitech Pulse-Eight	27	+1.720	3	15 (1)^{1}
4	3	(United Kingdom) Arvid Lindblad	Prema Racing	27	+2.197	4	12
5	4	(Italy) Leonardo Fornaroli	Trident	27	+2.667	5	10
6	1	(Sweden) Dino Beganovic	Prema Racing	27	+3.094	6	8
7	12	(Spain) Mari Boya	Campos Racing	27	+4.889	7	6
8	7	(Germany) Tim Tramnitz	MP Motorsport	27	+5.249	10	4
9	31	(United Kingdom) Joseph Loake	Rodin Motorsport	27	+6.602	8	2
10	10	(Germany) Oliver Goethe	Campos Racing	27	+8.007	13	1
11	8	(Poland) Kacper Sztuka	MP Motorsport	27	+8.469	15	
12	22	(Australia) Tommy Smith	Van Amersfoort Racing	27	+8.959	18	
13	29	(United Kingdom) Callum Voisin	Rodin Motorsport	27	+9.326	19	
14	6	(Mexico) Santiago Ramos	Trident	27	+10.963	17	
15	11	(Colombia) Sebastián Montoya	Campos Racing	27	+11.379	24	
16	9	(Republic of Ireland) Alex Dunne	MP Motorsport	27	+12.002	26	
17	18	(United States) Max Esterson	Jenzer Motorsport	27	+12.409	22	
18	26	(Thailand) Tasanapol Inthraphuvasak	AIX Racing	27	+13.443	27	
19	21	(Germany) Sophia Flörsch	Van Amersfoort Racing	27	+13.623	23^{2}	
20	28	(Austria) Joshua Dufek	AIX Racing	27	+14.069	25	
21	16	(United Kingdom) Cian Shields	Hitech Pulse-Eight	27	+15.201	29	
22	19	(United Kingdom) James Hedley	Jenzer Motorsport	27	+15.941	30	
23	20	(Mexico) Noel León	Van Amersfoort Racing	27	+17.360	9	
24	27	(Italy) Nikita Bedrin	AIX Racing	27	+17.575	16	
25	30	(Poland) Piotr Wiśnicki	Rodin Motorsport	27	+20.640	20	
26	15	(Norway) Martinius Stenshorne	Hitech Pulse-Eight	27	+26.465	28	
27	25	(Bulgaria) Nikola Tsolov	ART Grand Prix	27	+28.566	12	
DNF	24	(Netherlands) Laurens van Hoepen	ART Grand Prix	22	Accident	11	
DNF	5	(France) Sami Meguetounif	Trident	19	Accident	14	
DNF	17	(Austria) Charlie Wurz	Jenzer Motorsport	0	Collision	21	
Fastest lap set by (Norway) Martinius Stenshorne: 1:24.773 (lap 9)

Notes:

- ^1 – Martinius Stenshorne set the fastest lap but did not finish in the top 10, so was ineligible to score the point for it. Luke Browning scored the point for setting the fastest lap of those finishing in the top 10.
- ^2 – Sophia Flörsch received a five-place grid penalty for the Feature Race after causing a collision with Kacper Sztuka.

== Standings after the event ==
Drivers' Championship standings

	Pos.	Driver	Points
3	1	(Italy) Gabriele Minì	72
	2	(United Kingdom) Luke Browning	68
2	3	(Italy) Leonardo Fornaroli	64
1	4	(Sweden) Dino Beganovic	58
2	5	(United Kingdom) Arvid Lindblad	44

Teams' Championship standings

	Pos.	Team	Points
	1	(Italy) Prema Racing	174
	2	(Italy) Trident	119
2	3	(France) ART Grand Prix	85
1	4	(Spain) Campos Racing	85
1	5	(United Kingdom) Hitech Pulse-Eight	78

- Note: Only the top five positions are included for both sets of standings.

== See also ==
- 2024 Monaco Grand Prix
- 2024 Monte Carlo Formula 2 round

== Notes ==
Previous round: 2024 Imola Formula 3 round	FIA Formula 3 Championship; 2024 season	Next round: 2024 Barcelona Formula 3 round
Previous round: 2023 Monte Carlo Formula 3 round	Monte Carlo Formula 3 round	Next round: 2025 Monte Carlo Formula 3 round
