= Roman Bilinski =

Polish and British racing driver (born 2004)

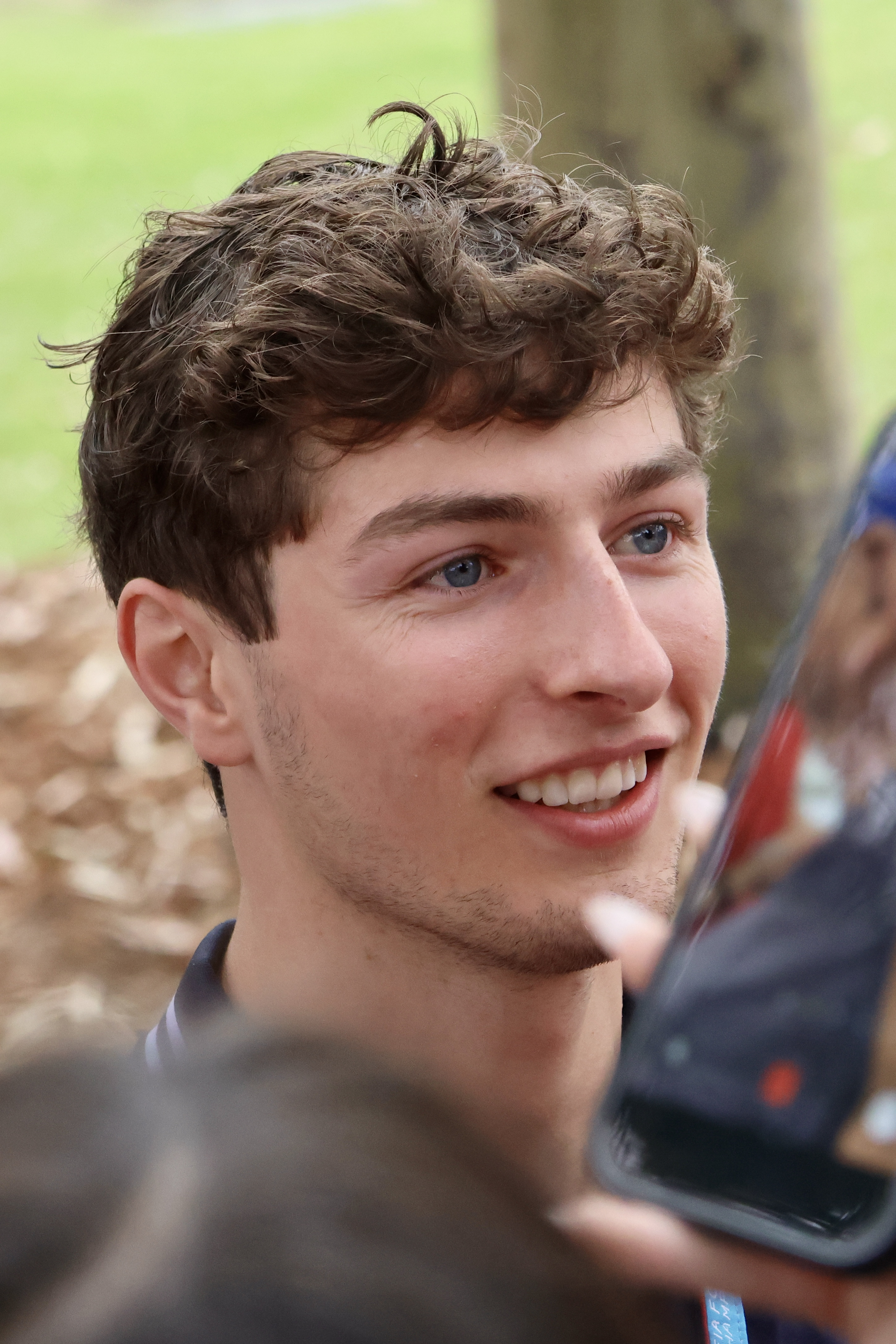
- Bilinski at the 2026 Australian Grand Prix
- Nationality: (Poland) Polish (United Kingdom) British via dual nationality
- Born: Roman Henio Piers Bilinski; 4 March 2004 (age 22) Lechlade, Gloucestershire, England

FIA Formula 2 Championship career
- Debut season: 2026
- Current team: DAMS Lucas Oil
- Car number: 8
- Starts: 17 (18 entries)
- Wins: 0
- Podiums: 1
- Poles: 0
- Fastest laps: 1
- Best finish: TBD in 2026

Previous series
- 2025: 2024; 2022–2024; 2021; 2020; 2019: FIA Formula 3; FR Oceania; FR European; GB3; F4 British; Ginetta Junior

Championship titles
- 2024: FR Oceania
- Statistics up to date as of 25 August 2026.

Roman Henio Piers Bilinski (born 4 March 2004) is a Polish and British racing driver who competes in the FIA Formula 2 Championship with DAMS Lucas Oil.

Bilinski is the 2024 Formula Regional Oceania Championship winner, previously competing in the FIA Formula 3 Championship for Rodin Motorsport. He previously raced in the F4 British Championship and won races in the GB3 Championship, before competing in the Formula Regional European Championship with Trident for three years.

== Career ==
=== Ginetta Junior Championship ===
Bilinski's racing career started in 2018, when he raced in the Winter Series of the Ginetta Junior Championship. He then competed in the first seven rounds of the 2019 season with Alastair Rushforth Motorsport. His first victory and pole position would come at the first race at Donington Park.

=== F4 British Championship ===
==== 2020 ====
In 2020, Bilinski made his single-seater debut in the F4 British Championship, partnering Alex Connor and Frederick Lubin at the TRS Arden Junior Team. His first podium came at Oulton Park.

Bilinski went on to finish two more races in third position and finished eighth in the championship at the end of the year.

==== 2021 ====
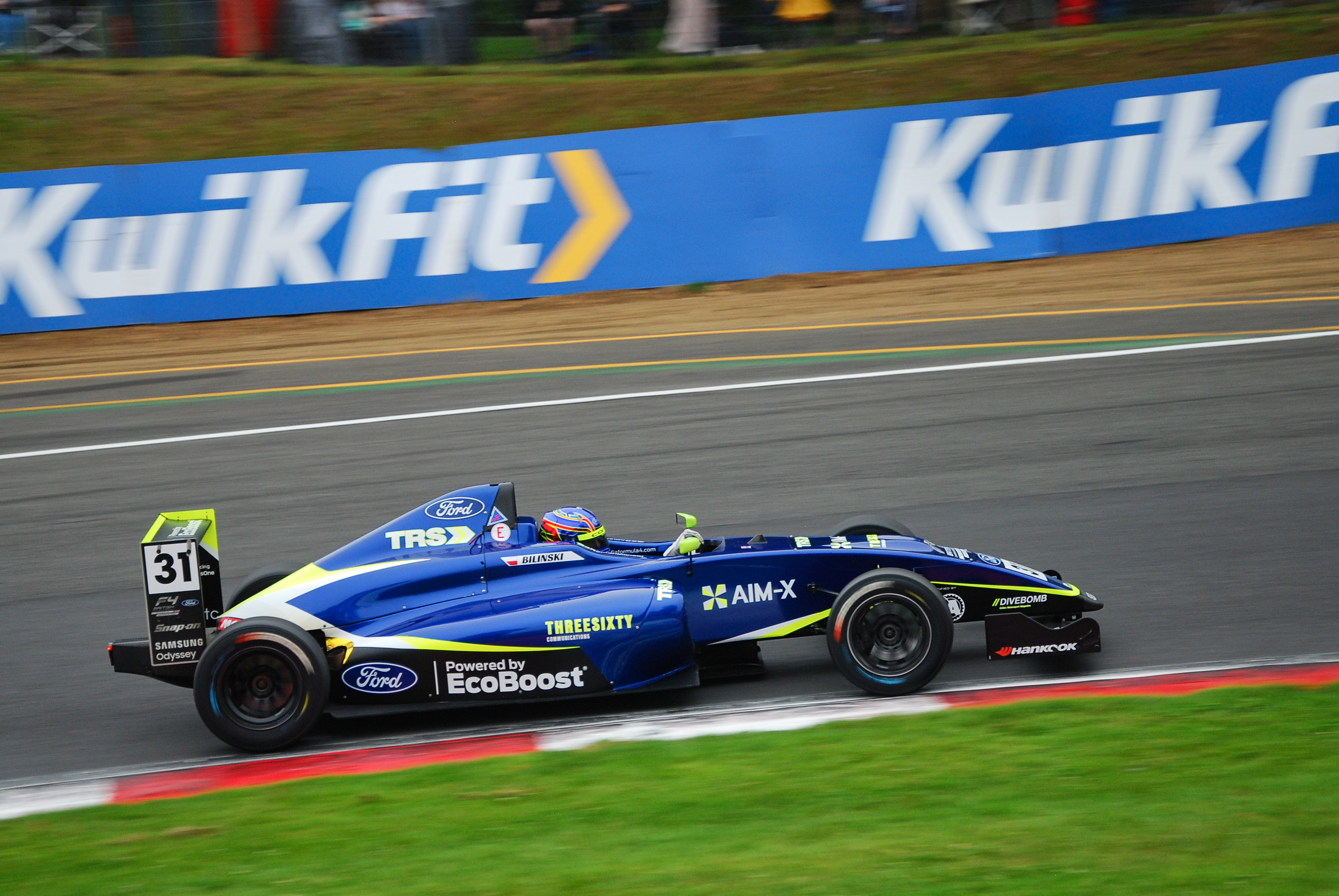
Bilinski in 2021.

For the 2021 campaign, Bilinski switched to Carlin to race alongside Kai Askey, Tasanapol Inthraphuvasak and Dougie Bolger. Bilinski only did a part season in the British F4 Championship, Bilinski scored his first podium finish of the season at Oulton Park in race 3.

=== GB3 Championship ===
Bilinski moved into the GB3 Championship to replace Frederick Lubin, who had fallen ill, at Arden International. The Pole experienced a very strong debut weekend, with three finishes in the top-five with only one day of testing. His next weekend would be even more successful: after finishing third in the first race, Bilinski became the first Polish driver to win a race in British F3. Snetterton was up next, and there Bilinski showed blistering pace, finishing third in the first and second race, and then won race 3 on Sunday, becoming the only driver to score a podium at every race on the same weekend that year. Bilinski won another race at Oulton Park and ended his season in seventh in the standings, beating both of his teammates with only a part season.

=== Formula Regional ===
==== 2022 ====
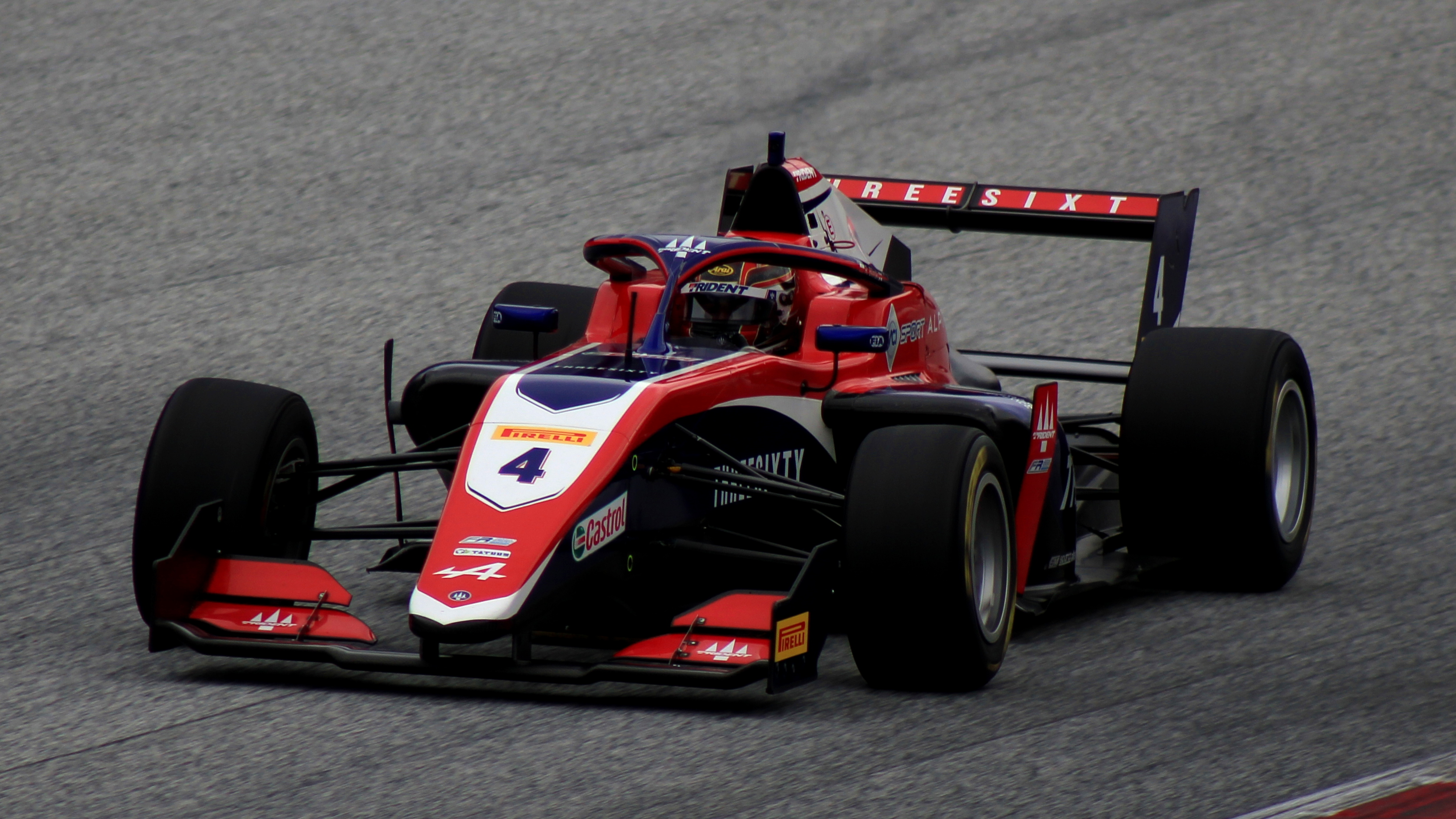
Bilinski racing in the 2022 Formula Regional European Championship at the Red Bull Ring.

For 2022, Bilinski moved up to the Formula Regional European Championship for the 2022 season with Trident. He had two points finishes in the season, with one being his maiden podium in the series at the first race of the Hungaroring, he finished the championship in 18th with 17 points.

==== 2023 ====
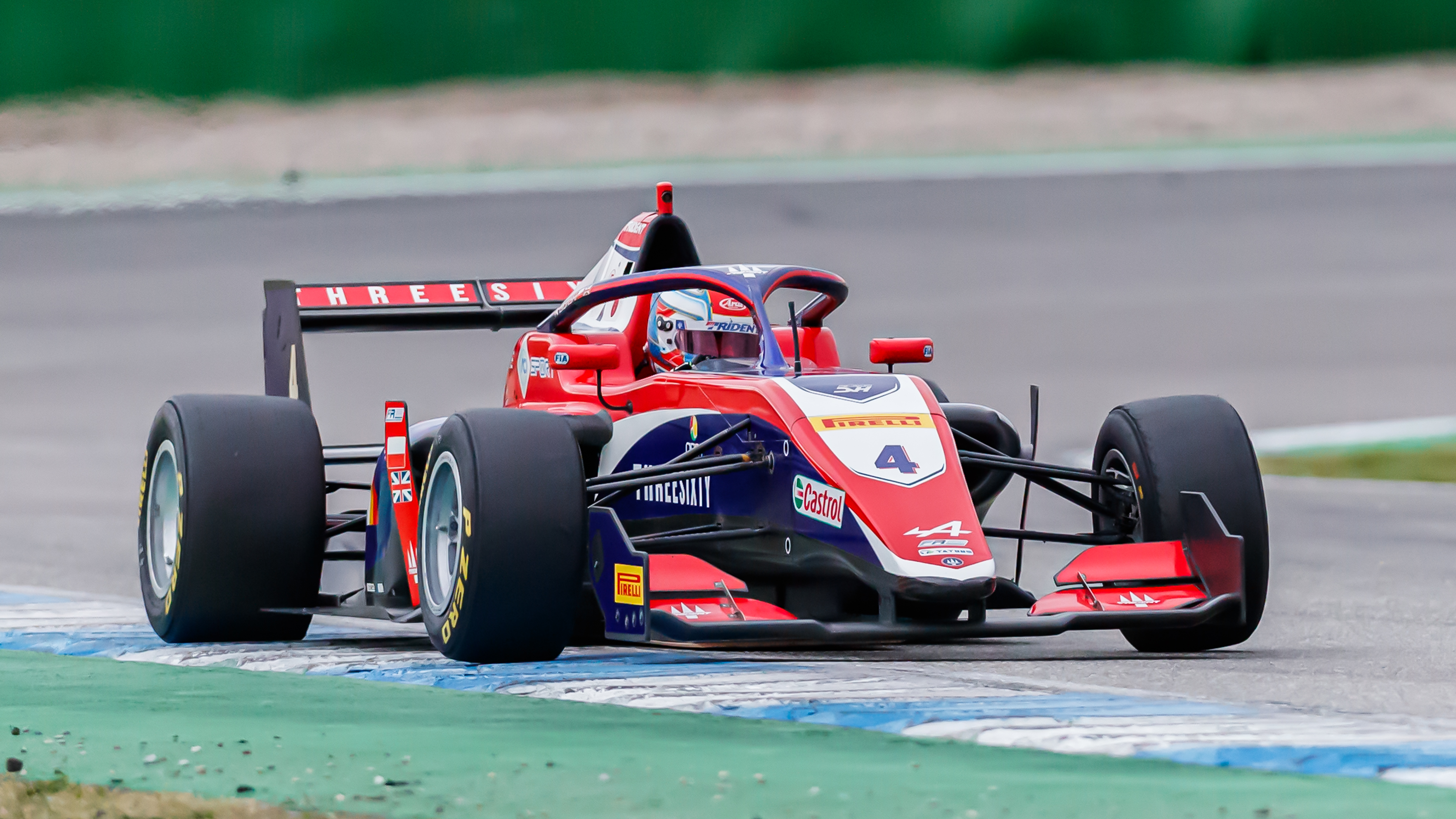
Bilinski driving at Hockenheim during the 2023 Formula Regional European Championship

Bilinski was retained by Trident for the 2023 season. He scored 23 points and finished 21st in the championship standings.

==== 2024 ====
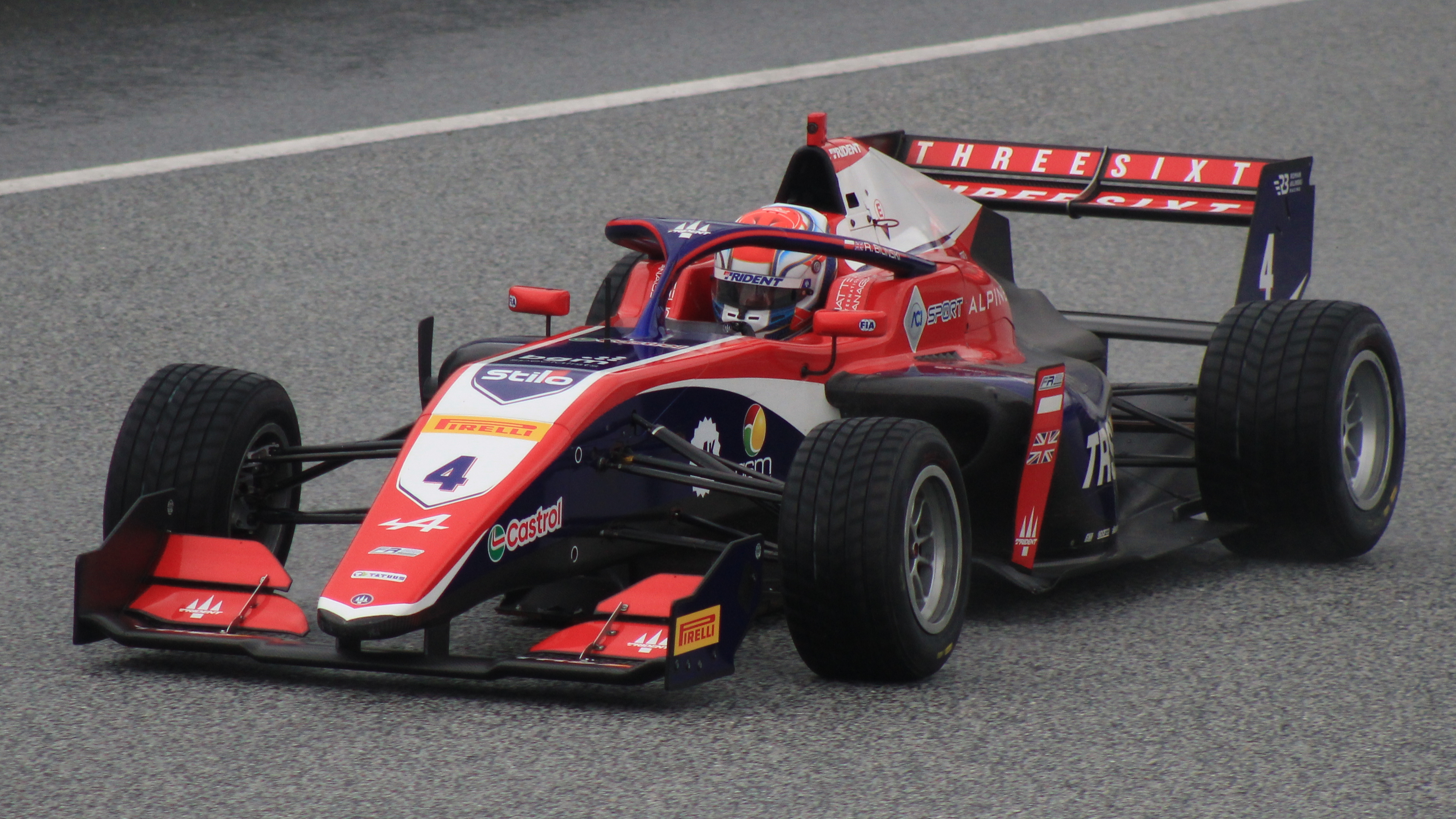
Bilinski racing in the 2024 Formula Regional European Championship at the Red Bull Ring.

At the start of 2024, Bilinski made his debut in the Formula Regional Oceania Championship with M2 Competition. He ended the season as the champion, with six wins and a further six podiums.

For his main campaign, Bilinski remained with Trident for a third straight season in the 2024 Formula Regional European Championship. He achieved his first pole in the series in Spa-Francorchamps and he would later finish in second, giving him his first podium of his campaign. Unfortunately for Bilinski, he was hospitalised in a road accident just before the Zandvoort round and was forced to withdraw from the event. Bilinski later revealed he had undergone surgery to fix two broken vertebrae from the road accident that left him with no feedback from left foot nerves, forcing him to step away from racing for the time being.

=== FIA Formula 3 Championship ===
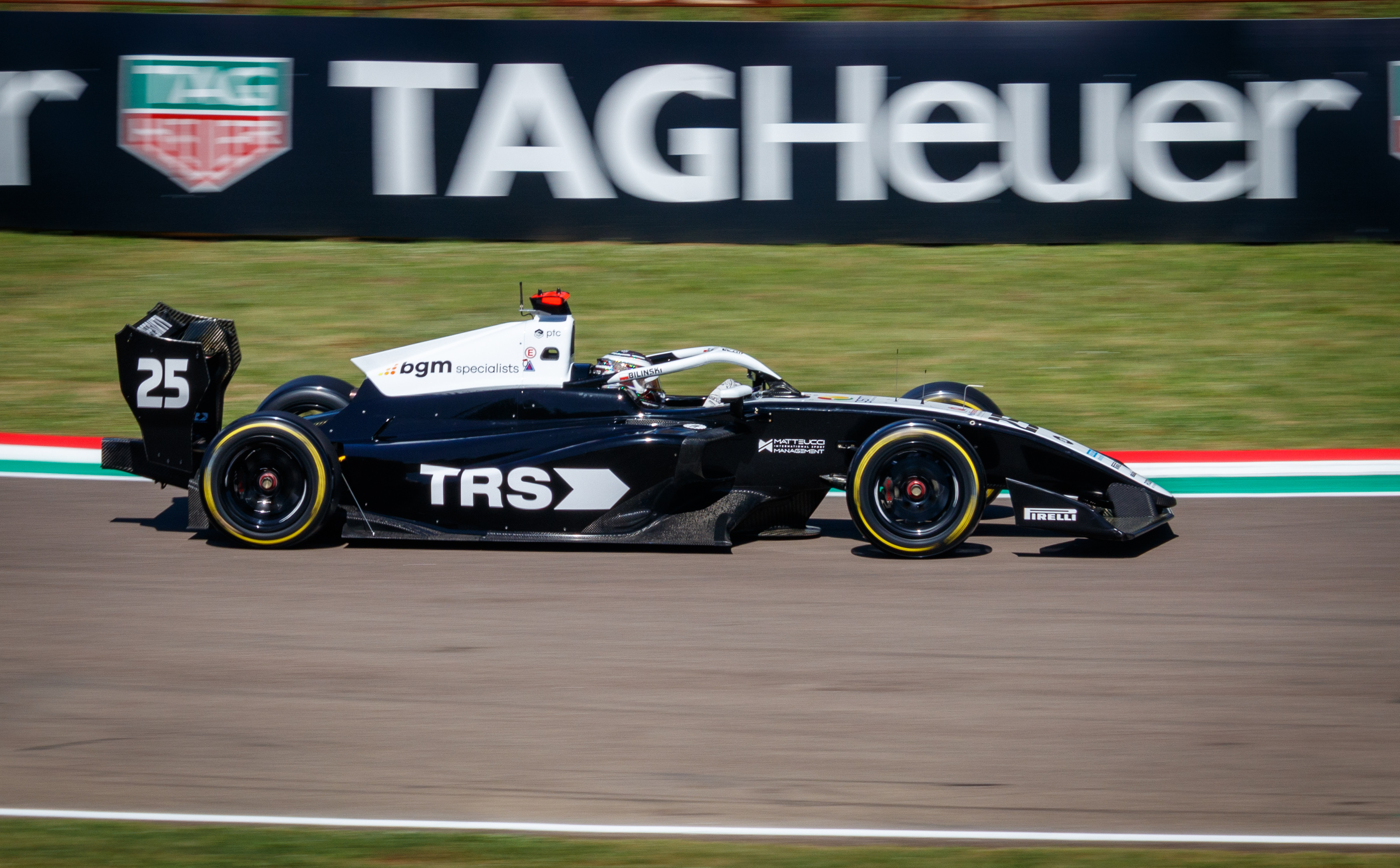
Bilinski driving the Dallara F3 2025 during the 2025 Imola Formula 3 round

After three years in Formula Regional, Bilinski stepped up to Formula 3 for 2025, joining Rodin Motorsport alongside GB3 champions Callum Voisin and Louis Sharp. He finished 11th in the standings, winning the Sprint in Monza, and standing on podium twice, in season-opening sprint in Melbourne and during the main race in Monaco.

=== FIA Formula 2 Championship ===
==== 2026 ====
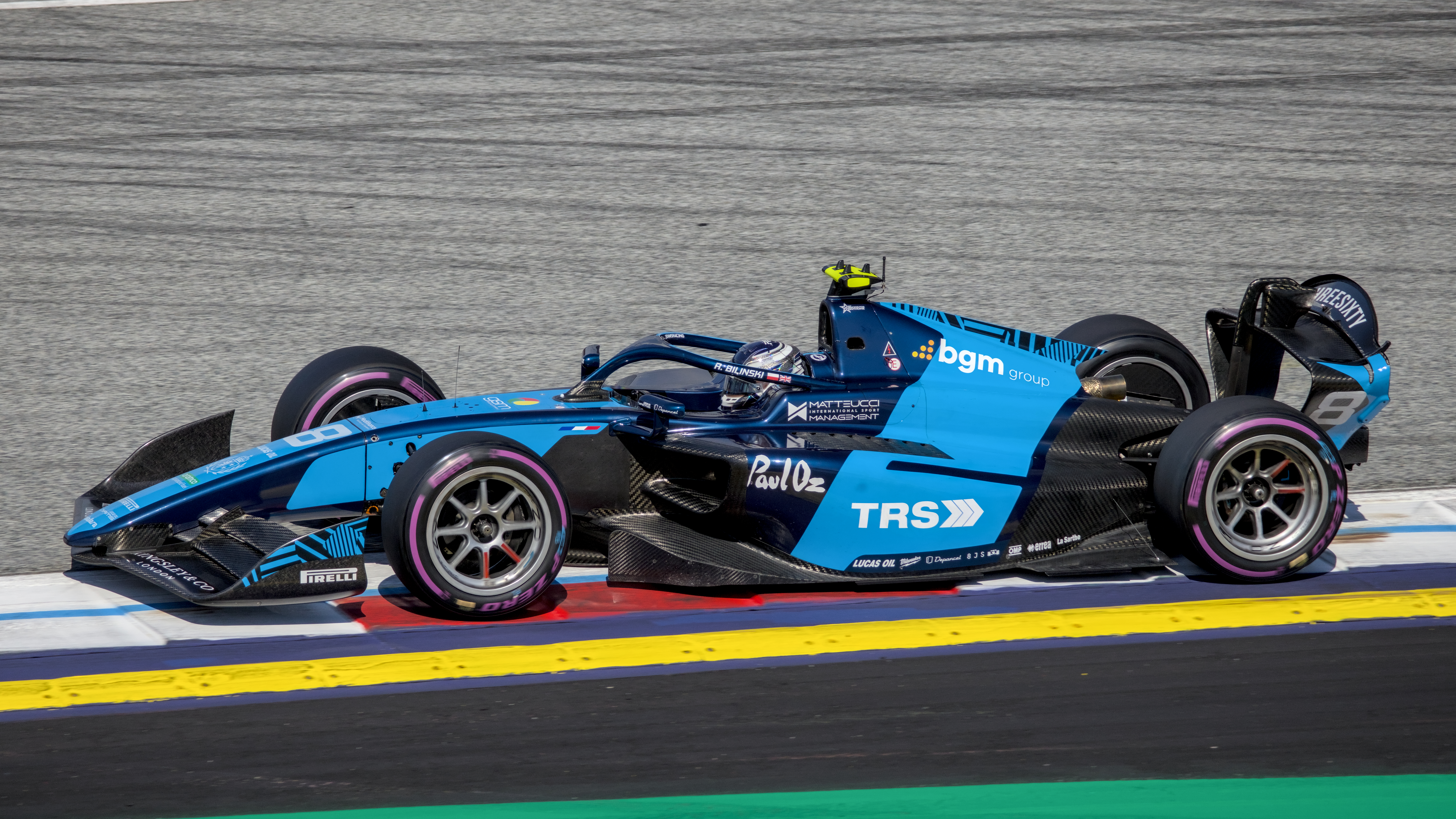
Bilinski driving the Dallara F2 2024 during the 2026 Spielberg Formula 2 round

In 2026, Bilinski moved up to Formula 2 with DAMS Lucas Oil, partnering Ferrari-backed Dino Beganovic.

==== 2027 ====
Bilinski will move to Hitech alongside Joshua Dürksen for his second season in 2027.

== Racing record ==
=== Racing career summary ===
Season	Series	Team	Races	Wins	Poles	F/Laps	Podiums	Points	Position
2019	Ginetta Junior Championship	In2Racing	5	0	2	1	0	87	20th
2019	Ginetta Junior Championship	Alastair Rushforth Motorsport	13	0	0	0	1	87	20th
2020	F4 British Championship	TRS Arden Junior Team	26	0	0	1	3	156	8th
2021	F4 British Championship	Carlin	12	0	0	0	1	50	17th
2021	GB3 Championship	Arden International	18	3	1	1	7	313	7th
2022	Formula Regional European Championship	Trident	20	0	0	0	1	17	18th
2023	Formula Regional European Championship	Trident	20	0	0	0	0	23	21st
2024	Formula Regional Oceania Championship	M2 Competition	15	6	5	6	12	385	**1st**
2024	Formula Regional European Championship	Trident	12	0	1	0	1	52	15th
2025	FIA Formula 3 Championship	Rodin Motorsport	19	1	0	0	3	65	11th
2026	FIA Formula 2 Championship	DAMS Lucas Oil	25	0	0	0	1	36	16th*
2027	FIA Formula 2 Championship	Hitech	0	0	0	0	0	0	TBD

* Season still in progress.

=== Complete Ginetta Junior Championship results ===
(key) (Races in bold indicate pole position) (Races in italics indicate fastest lap)

Year	Entrant	1	2	3	4	5	6	7	8	9	10	11	12	13	14	15	16	17	18	19	20	21	22	23	24	25	26	27	Pos	Points
2019	In2Racing	BHI; 1 DNS	BHI; 2; 11	**DON**; **1** DSQ	**DON**; **2** Ret	DON; 3; 10																							20th	87
2019	Alastair Rushforth Motorsport						THR1; 1; 13	THR1; 2; 6	CRO; 1 C	CRO; 2; 20	OUL; 1; 8	OUL; 2 DNS	SNE; 1; 15	SNE; 2; 6	SNE; 3; 7	SNE; 4; 3	THR2; 1 Ret	THR2; 2 Ret	THR2; 3 DNS	KNO; 1	KNO; 2	KNO; 3	SIL; 1	SIL; 2	SIL; 3	BHGP; 1	BHGP; 2	BHGP; 3	20th	87

=== Complete F4 British Championship results ===
(key) (Races in bold indicate pole position) (Races in italics indicate fastest lap)

Year	Entrant	1	2	3	4	5	6	7	8	9	10	11	12	13	14	15	16	17	18	19	20	21	22	23	24	25	26	27	28	29	30	Pos	Points
2020	TRS Arden Junior Team	DON; 1; 8	DON; 2; 7	DON; 3; 12	BHGP; 1; 8	BHGP; 2; 6	BHGP; 3; 5	OUL; 1; 6	OUL; 2; 3	OUL; 3; 7	KNO; 1; 5	KNO; 2 DSQ	KNO; 3; 7	THR; 1; 8	THR; 2; 3	THR; 3; 6	SIL; 1; 7	SIL; 2; 4	SIL; 3; 5	CRO; 1; 5	CRO; 2 Ret	SNE; 1; 6	SNE; 2; 3	SNE; 3; 10	BHI; 1; 7	BHI; 2; 10	BHI; 3; 6					8th	156
2021	Carlin	THR1; 1; 7	THR1; 2; 8	THR1; 3; 7	SNE; 1; 10	SNE; 2 Ret	SNE; 3; 12	BHI; 1; 7^{6}	BHI; 2; 5	BHI; 3; 12	OUL; 1; 4	OUL; 2; 16	OUL; 3; 3	KNO; 1	KNO; 2	KNO; 3	THR2; 1	THR2; 2	THR2; 3	CRO; 1	CRO; 2	CRO; 3	SIL; 1	SIL; 2	SIL; 3	DON; 1	DON; 2	DON; 3	BHGP; 1	BHGP; 2	BHGP; 3	17th	50

=== Complete GB3 Championship results ===
(key) (Races in bold indicate pole position; races in italics indicate fastest lap; ^{superscript} indicates points for positions gained)

Year	Entrant	1	2	3	4	5	6	7	8	9	10	11	12	13	14	15	16	17	18	19	20	21	22	23	24	Pos	Points
2021	Arden International	BRH; 1	BRH; 2	BRH; 3	SIL1; 1	SIL1; 2	SIL1; 3	DON1; 1; 4	DON1; 2; 5	DON1; 3; 5^{7}	SPA; 1; 3	SPA; 2; 1	SPA; 3; 4^{8}	SNE; 1; 3	SNE; 2; 3	SNE; 3; 1^{2}	SIL2; 1; 8	SIL2; 2 Ret	SIL2; 3 Ret	OUL; 1; 11	OUL; 2; 13	OUL; 3; 1^{3}	DON2; 1; 3	DON2; 2; 9	DON2; 3; 9^{8}	7th	313

=== Complete Formula Regional European Championship results ===
(key) (Races in bold indicate pole position) (Races in italics indicate fastest lap)

Year	Entrant	1	2	3	4	5	6	7	8	9	10	11	12	13	14	15	16	17	18	19	20	Pos	Points
2022	Trident	MNZ; 1; 13	MNZ; 2; 18	IMO; 1; 14	IMO; 2; 14	MCO; 1; 18	MCO; 2 Ret	LEC; 1; 16	LEC; 2; 9	ZAN; 1; 11	ZAN; 2; 11	HUN; 1; 3	HUN; 2 Ret	SPA; 1; 11	SPA; 2; 19	RBR; 1; 17	RBR; 2 Ret	CAT; 1; 21	CAT; 2; 14	MUG; 1; 21	MUG; 2; 25	18th	17
2023	Trident	IMO; 1 Ret	IMO; 2 Ret	CAT; 1; 15	CAT; 2; 8	HUN; 1; 12	HUN; 2; 17	SPA; 1; 13	SPA; 2; 24	MUG; 1; 11	MUG; 2; 15	LEC; 1; 20	LEC; 2; 16	RBR; 1; 7	RBR; 2; 9	MNZ; 1; 16	MNZ; 2; 14	ZAN; 1; 5	ZAN; 2; 19	HOC; 1; 11	HOC; 2; 12	21st	23
2024	Trident	HOC; 1; 9	HOC; 2; 11	**SPA**; **1**; 2	SPA; 2; 29†	ZAN; 1	ZAN; 2	HUN; 1	HUN; 2	MUG; 1	MUG; 2	LEC; 1	LEC; 2	IMO; 1; 9	IMO; 2; 7	RBR; 1; 4	RBR; 2; 8	CAT; 1; 9	CAT; 2 Ret	MNZ; 1; 7	MNZ; 2; 26	15th	52

=== Complete Formula Regional Oceania Championship results ===
(key) (Races in bold indicate pole position) (Races in italics indicate fastest lap)

Year	Entrant	1	2	3	4	5	6	7	8	9	10	11	12	13	14	15	Pos	Points
2024	M2 Competition	TAU; 1; 1	TAU; 2; 2	TAU; 3; 1	**MAN**; **1**; 1	MAN; 2; 17	**MAN**; **3**; 1	HMP; 1; 1	HMP; 2; 3	**HMP**; **3**; 2	**RUA**; **1**; 1	RUA; 2; 4	**RUA**; **3**; 2	HIG; 1; 3	HIG; 2; 3	HIG; 3; 5	1st	385

=== Complete FIA Formula 3 Championship results ===
(key) (Races in bold indicate pole position; races in italics indicate points for the fastest lap of the top-10 finishers)

Year	Entrant	1	2	3	4	5	6	7	8	9	10	11	12	13	14	15	16	17	18	19	20	Pos	Points
2025	Rodin Motorsport	MEL; SPR; 3	MEL; FEA; 9	BHR; SPR; 20	BHR; FEA; 13	IMO; SPR; 5	IMO; FEA; 8	MON; SPR; 11	MON; FEA; 2	CAT; SPR; Ret	CAT; FEA; Ret	RBR; SPR; 15	RBR; FEA; 23	SIL; SPR; 10	SIL; FEA; 4	SPA; SPR; 13	SPA; FEA; C	HUN; SPR; 14	HUN; FEA; 14	MNZ; SPR; 1	MNZ; FEA; 7	11th	65

=== Complete FIA Formula 2 Championship results ===
(key) (Races in bold indicate pole position; races in italics indicate points for the fastest lap of the top-10 finishers)

Year	Entrant	1	2	3	4	5	6	7	8	9	10	11	12	13	14	15	16	17	18	19	20	21	22	23	24	25	26	27	28	29	DC	Points
2026	DAMS Lucas Oil	MEL; SPR; 8	MEL; FEA; 12	MIA; SPR; 14	MIA; FEA; DNS	MTL; SPR; 8	MTL; FEA; 13	MON; SPR; 2	MON; FEA; 10	CAT; SPR; 21	CAT; FEA; 10	RBR; SPR; 6	RBR; FEA; 10	SIL; SPR; 7	SIL; FEA; 8	SPA; SPR; 7	SPA; FEA; Ret	HUN; SPR; 18	HUN; FEA; 14	MNZ; SPR; Ret	MNZ; FEA; 21	MAD; SPR; 11	MAD; FEA; 9	BAK; SPR; 6	BAK; FEA1; 7	BAK; FEA2; 10	LSL; SPR	LSL; FEA	YMC; SPR	YMC; FEA	16th*	36*
2027	Hitech	BHR; SPR	BHR; FEA	JED; SPR	JED; FEA	MEL; SPR	MEL; FEA	MTL; SPR	MTL; FEA	MON; SPR	MON; FEA	SIL; SPR	SIL; FEA	RBR; SPR	RBR; FEA	MNZ; SPR	MNZ; FEA	MAD; SPR	MAD; FEA	BAK; SPR	BAK; FEA	IST; SPR	IST; FEA	MXC; SPR	MXC; FEA	LSL; SPR	LSL; FEA	YMC; SPR	YMC; FEA		TBD	TBD

* Season still in progress.
