= 2025 Monte Carlo Formula 3 round =

Fourth round of the 2025 FIA Formula 3 season

(Monaco) 2025 Monte Carlo Formula 3 round
Round details
- Round 4 of 10 in the 2025 FIA Formula 3 Championship.
- Layout of the Circuit de Monaco
- Location: Circuit de Monaco; Monte Carlo, Monaco
- Course: Street circuit 3.337 km (2.074 mi)

Sprint Race
- Date: 24 May 2025
- Laps: 23
Podium
First	(Norway) Martinius Stenshorne	Hitech TGR
Second	(Finland) Tuukka Taponen	ART Grand Prix
Third	(Netherlands) Laurens van Hoepen	ART Grand Prix
Fastest lap
Driver	(Norway) Martinius Stenshorne	Hitech TGR
- Time: 1:25.483 (on lap 22)

Feature Race
- Date: 25 May 2025
- Laps: 27
Pole position
Driver	(Bulgaria) Nikola Tsolov	Campos Racing
Time	1:24.882	
Podium
First	(Bulgaria) Nikola Tsolov	Campos Racing
Second	(Poland) Roman Bilinski	Rodin Motorsport
Third	(Spain) Mari Boya	Campos Racing
Fastest lap
Driver	(Bulgaria) Nikola Tsolov	Campos Racing
- Time: 1:24.886 (on lap 26)

The 2025 Monte Carlo FIA Formula 3 round was a motor racing event held between 23 and 24 May 2025 at the Circuit de Monaco in Monte Carlo, Monaco. It was the fourth round of the 2025 FIA Formula 3 Championship and was held in support of the 2025 Monaco Grand Prix.

In the group qualifying format, Nikola Tsolov claimed his maiden pole position ahead of Roman Biliński. Martinius Stenshorne won the sprint race, ahead of Tuukka Taponen and Laurens van Hoepen. A large crash on the opening lap saw five cars eliminated from the race, with James Hedley withdrawing from the weekend due to a hand injury. Tsolov then won the feature race from pole position, followed by Bilinski and Mari Boya. By winning the feature race, Tsolov set a new record for the most wins (5) in Formula 3. Despite not finishing the feature race after his wheel came loose, Rafael Câmara remained in the championship lead, thirteen points ahead of Tim Tramnitz.

== Classification ==
=== Qualifying ===
==== Group A ====
Qualifying for Group A was held on 23 May 2025, at 11:05 local time (UTC+2).

Pos.	No.	Driver	Entrant	Time/Gap	Grid SR	Grid FR
1	12	(Bulgaria) Nikola Tsolov	Campos Racing	1:24.882	12	1
2	10	(Spain) Mari Boya	Campos Racing	+0.127	10	3
3	2	(Mexico) Noel León	Prema Racing	+0.504	7	5
4	6	(Austria) Charlie Wurz	Trident	+0.530	5	7
5	8	(Finland) Tuukka Taponen	ART Grand Prix	+0.638	4	8
6	14	(Norway) Martinius Stenshorne	Hitech TGR	+0.840	2	10
7	24	(New Zealand) Louis Sharp	Rodin Motorsport	+0.943	13	13
8	4	(Denmark) Noah Strømsted	Trident	+0.959	15	15
9	22	(Portugal) Ivan Domingues	Van Amersfoort Racing	+0.966	17	17
10	28	(United States) Brad Benavides	AIX Racing	+1.072	19	19
11	30	(Peru) Matías Zagazeta	DAMS Lucas Oil	+1.119	21	21
12	20	(France) Théophile Naël	Van Amersfoort Racing	+1.122	23	23
13	18	(Spain) Bruno del Pino	MP Motorsport	+1.127	25	25
14	16	(China) Gerrard Xie	Hitech TGR	+1.203	27	27
15	26	(United Kingdom) James Hedley	AIX Racing	+1.712	29	WD^{4}

==== Group B ====
Qualifying for Group B was held on 23 May 2025, at 11:29 local time (UTC+2).

Pos.	No.	Driver	Entrant	Time/Gap	Grid SR	Grid FR
1	25	(Poland) Roman Bilinski	Rodin Motorsport	1:25.332	11	2
2	23	(United Kingdom) Callum Voisin	Rodin Motorsport	+0.027	9	4
3	17	(Germany) Tim Tramnitz	MP Motorsport	+0.093	6	6
4	5	(Brazil) Rafael Câmara	Trident	+0.152	8^{1}	11^{1}
5	7	(Netherlands) Laurens van Hoepen	ART Grand Prix	+0.233	3	9
6	19	(France) Alessandro Giusti	MP Motorsport	+0.321	1	12
7	3	(United States) Ugo Ugochukwu	Prema Racing	+0.604	14	14
8	15	(Austria) Joshua Dufek	Hitech TGR	+0.781	16	16
9	11	(Thailand) Tasanapol Inthraphuvasak	Campos Racing	+0.877	18	18
10	31	(Singapore) Christian Ho	DAMS Lucas Oil	+1.067	20	20
11	9	(Australia) James Wharton	ART Grand Prix	+1.125	22	22
12	21	(Mexico) Santiago Ramos	Van Amersfoort Racing	+2.465	24	24
13	1	(Italy) Brando Badoer	Prema Racing	+2.500^{2}	26	26
14	27	(Italy) Nicola Marinangeli	AIX Racing	+2.644	28	28
107% time: 1:38.660 (+6.454)
—	29	(Italy) Nicola Lacorte	DAMS Lucas Oil	No time^{3}	30	29

Notes:

- ^1 Rafael Câmara was given a three-place grid penalty for both races for violating the minimum delta time under red flag conditions. This demoted him from 5th to 8th for the sprint race, and from 8th to 11th for the feature race.
- ^2 Brando Badoer had his fastest lap time deleted for causing a red flag. This demoted him from 12th to 13th.
- ^3 Nicola Lacorte was disqualified from qualifying for failing to respect a black flag after receiving physical assistance from the track marshals. He was permitted to start both races from the back of the grid.
- ^4 James Hedley was withdrawn from the feature race after sustaining a hand injury in the sprint race.

=== Sprint race ===
The sprint race was held on 24 May 2025, at 10:45 local time (UTC+2).

Pos.	No.	Driver	Team	Laps	Time/Gap	Grid	Pts.
1	14	(Norway) Martinius Stenshorne	Hitech TGR	23	38:25.135	2	10 (1)
2	8	(Finland) Tuukka Taponen	ART Grand Prix	23	+2.253	4	9
3	7	(Netherlands) Laurens van Hoepen	ART Grand Prix	23	+4.770	3	8
4	19	(France) Alessandro Giusti	MP Motorsport	23	+6.002	1	7
5	17	(Germany) Tim Tramnitz	MP Motorsport	23	+6.396	6	6
6	6	(Austria) Charlie Wurz	Trident	23	+8.454	5	5
7	5	(Brazil) Rafael Câmara	Trident	23	+8.732	8	4
8	10	(Spain) Mari Boya	Campos Racing	23	+10.614	10	3
9	24	(New Zealand) Louis Sharp	Rodin Motorsport	23	+12.203	13	2
10	23	(United Kingdom) Callum Voisin	Rodin Motorsport	23	+12.907	9	1
11	25	(Poland) Roman Bilinski	Rodin Motorsport	23	+13.636	11	
12	28	(United States) Brad Benavides	AIX Racing	23	+14.828	19	
13	3	(United States) Ugo Ugochukwu	Prema Racing	23	+21.287	14	
14	15	(Austria) Joshua Dufek	Hitech TGR	23	+21.629	16	
15	31	(Singapore) Christian Ho	DAMS Lucas Oil	23	+22.214	20	
16	20	(France) Théophile Naël	Van Amersfoort Racing	23	+22.508	23	
17	30	(Peru) Matías Zagazeta	DAMS Lucas Oil	23	+24.864	21	
18	16	(China) Gerrard Xie	Hitech TGR	23	+27.816	27	
19	27	(Italy) Nicola Marinangeli	AIX Racing	23	+29.272	28	
20	1	(Italy) Brando Badoer	Prema Racing	23	+30.580	26	
21	9	(Australia) James Wharton	ART Grand Prix	23	+32.540	22	
22	18	(Spain) Bruno del Pino	MP Motorsport	23	+35.411^{1}	25	
23	11	(Thailand) Tasanapol Inthraphuvasak	Campos Racing	23	+55.832^{2}	18	
24	12	(Bulgaria) Nikola Tsolov	Campos Racing	22	+1 lap	12	
DNF	4	(Denmark) Noah Strømsted	Trident	13	Collision damage	15	
DNF	2	(Mexico) Noel León	Prema Racing	0	Collision	7	
DNF	22	(Portugal) Ivan Domingues	Van Amersfoort Racing	0	Collision	17	
DNF	21	(Mexico) Santiago Ramos	Van Amersfoort Racing	0	Collision	24	
DNF	26	(United Kingdom) James Hedley	AIX Racing	0	Collision	29	
DNF	29	(Italy) Nicola Lacorte	DAMS Lucas Oil	0	Collision damage	30	
Fastest lap: (Norway) Martinius Stenshorne (1:34.581 on lap 18)

Notes:

- ^1 Bruno del Pino was given a ten-second penalty for leaving the track and gaining an advantage, and was later given a five-second penalty for a false start. This demoted him from 18th to 22nd.
- ^2 Tasanapol Inthraphuvasak was given a thirty-second penalty for re-taking his grid position after being passed by other cars on the formation lap. This demoted him from 19th to 23rd.

=== Feature race ===
The feature race was held on 25 May 2025, at 08:00 local time (UTC+2).

Pos.	No.	Driver	Team	Laps	Time/Gap	Grid	Pts.
1	12	(Bulgaria) Nikola Tsolov	Campos Racing	27	42:16.874	1	25 (2+1)
2	25	(Poland) Roman Bilinski	Rodin Motorsport	27	+7.243	2	18
3	10	(Spain) Mari Boya	Campos Racing	27	+7.737	3	15
4	23	(United Kingdom) Callum Voisin	Rodin Motorsport	27	+8.408	4	12
5	17	(Germany) Tim Tramnitz	MP Motorsport	27	+8.728	6	10
6	7	(Netherlands) Laurens van Hoepen	ART Grand Prix	27	+9.416	9	8
7	8	(Finland) Tuukka Taponen	ART Grand Prix	27	+12.970	8	6
8	14	(Norway) Martinius Stenshorne	Hitech TGR	27	+13.720	10	4
9	24	(New Zealand) Louis Sharp	Rodin Motorsport	27	+14.312	13	2
10	19	(France) Alessandro Giusti	MP Motorsport	27	+14.854	12	1
11	9	(Australia) James Wharton	ART Grand Prix	27	+15.382	22	
12	11	(Thailand) Tasanapol Inthraphuvasak	Campos Racing	27	+27.105	18	
13	31	(Singapore) Christian Ho	DAMS Lucas Oil	27	+27.713	20	
14	3	(United States) Ugo Ugochukwu	Prema Racing	27	+28.660	14	
15	30	(Peru) Matías Zagazeta	DAMS Lucas Oil	27	+29.513	21	
16	21	(Mexico) Santiago Ramos	Van Amersfoort Racing	27	+35.250	24	
17	15	(Austria) Joshua Dufek	Hitech TGR	27	+36.205^{1}	16	
18	4	(Denmark) Noah Strømsted	Trident	27	+37.299^{2}	15	
19	16	(China) Gerrard Xie	Hitech TGR	27	+37.971	27	
20	22	(Portugal) Ivan Domingues	Van Amersfoort Racing	27	+40.745^{3}	17	
21	27	(Italy) Nicola Marinangeli	AIX Racing	27	+44.300^{4}	28	
22	20	(France) Théophile Naël	Van Amersfoort Racing	26	Retired	23	
DNF	5	(Brazil) Rafael Câmara	Trident	22	Wheel	11	
NC	18	(Spain) Bruno del Pino	MP Motorsport	22	+5 laps	25	
DNF	6	(Austria) Charlie Wurz	Trident	20	Accident	7	
DNF	1	(Italy) Brando Badoer	Prema Racing	20	Accident	26	
DNF	28	(United States) Brad Benavides	AIX Racing	19	Retired	19	
DNF	2	(Mexico) Noel León	Prema Racing	17	Accident	5	
DNF	29	(Italy) Nicola Lacorte	DAMS Lucas Oil	14	Suspension	29	
WD	26	(United Kingdom) James Hedley	AIX Racing	0	Withdrawn		
Fastest lap: (Bulgaria) Nikola Tsolov (1:24.886 on lap 26)

Notes:

- ^1 Joshua Dufek was given a ten-second penalty for leaving the track and gaining an advantage. This demoted him from 12th to 17th.
- ^2 Noah Strømsted was given a ten-second penalty for leaving the track and gaining an advantage. This demoted him from 14th to 18th.
- ^3 Ivan Domingues was given a ten-second penalty for leaving the track and gaining an advantage. This demoted him from 18th to 20th.
- ^4 Nicola Marinangeli was given a ten-second penalty for causing a collision. This demoted him from 19th to 21st.

== Standings after the event ==
Drivers' Championship standings

	Pos.	Driver	Points
	1	(Brazil) Rafael Câmara	77
1	2	(Germany) Tim Tramnitz	64
3	3	(Bulgaria) Nikola Tsolov	61
2	4	(Denmark) Noah Strømsted	52
1	5	(Finland) Tuukka Taponen	51

Teams' Championship standings

	Pos.	Team	Points
	1	(Italy) Trident	144
1	2	(Spain) Campos Racing	106
1	3	(Netherlands) MP Motorsport	100
1	4	(New Zealand) Rodin Motorsport	89
1	5	(France) ART Grand Prix	68

Note: Only the top five positions are included for both sets of standings.

== See also ==
- 2025 Monaco Grand Prix
- 2025 Monte Carlo Formula 2 round

Previous round: 2025 Imola Formula 3 round	FIA Formula 3 Championship; 2025 season	Next round: 2025 Barcelona Formula 3 round
Previous round: 2024 Monte Carlo Formula 3 round	Monte Carlo Formula 3 round	Next round: 2026 Monte Carlo Formula 3 round
