= Santiago Ramos (racing driver) =

Mexican racing driver (born 2004)

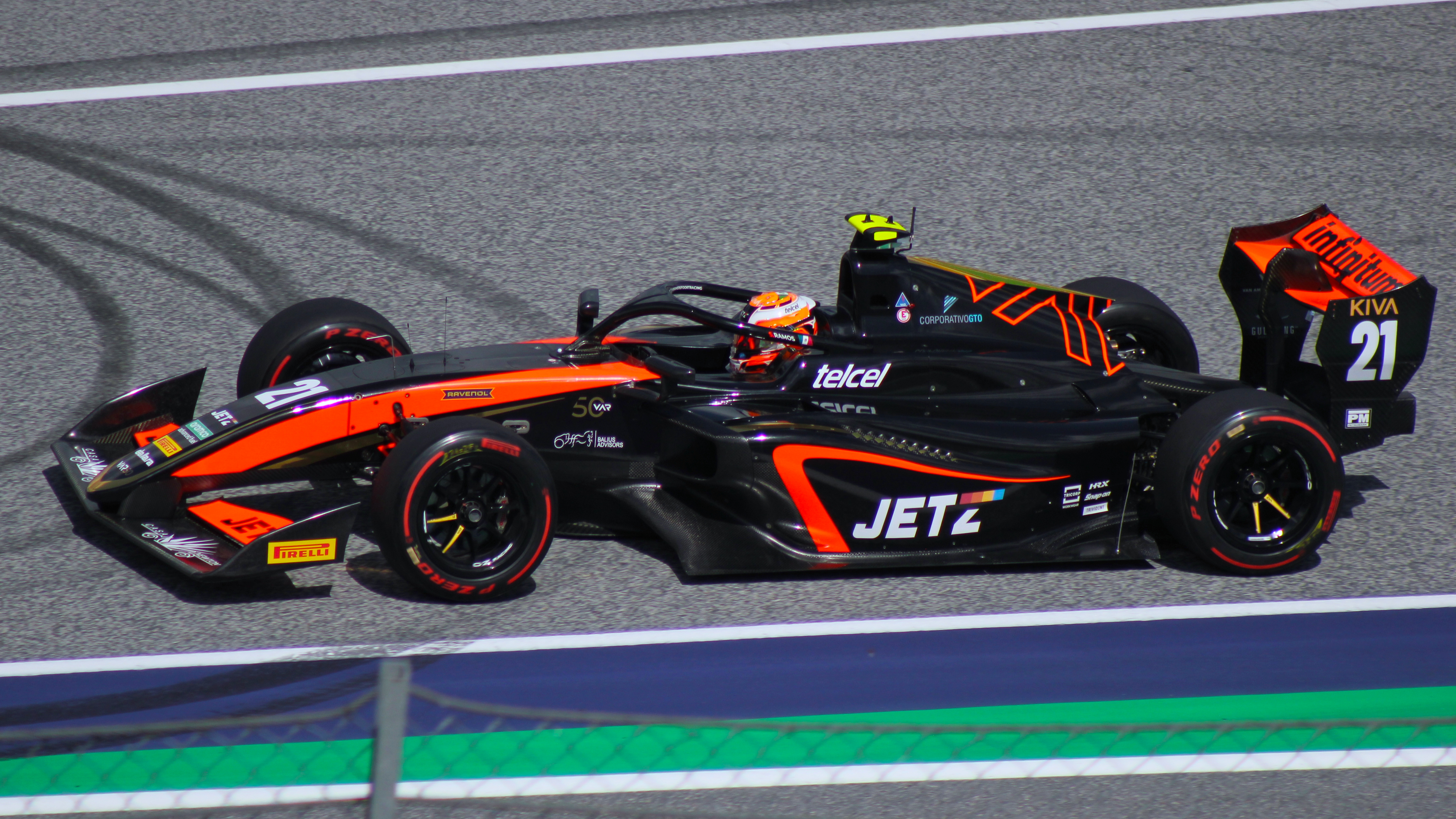
- Ramos driving the Dallara F3 2025 during the 2025 Spielberg Formula 3 round
- Nationality: (Mexico) Mexican
- Born: Santiago Ramos Reynoso; 26 January 2004 (age 22) Guadalajara, Jalisco, Mexico

FIA Formula 3 Championship career
- Debut season: 2024
- Car number: 21
- Former teams: Trident, Van Amersfoort Racing
- Starts: 37
- Wins: 2
- Podiums: 4
- Poles: 1
- Fastest laps: 0
- Best finish: 15th in 2025

Previous series
- 2022–2023 2021 2021 2019, 2021: FR European Championship; ADAC Formula 4 Italian F4 Championship; F4 Spanish Championship

Santiago Ramos Reynoso (born 26 January 2004) is a Mexican former racing driver who last competed in the FIA Formula 3 Championship for Van Amersfoort Racing.

== Career ==
=== Karting ===
Between 2017 and 2019, Ramos competed in various karting championships, as the German Karting Championship and the WSK Euro Series.

=== Formula 4 ===
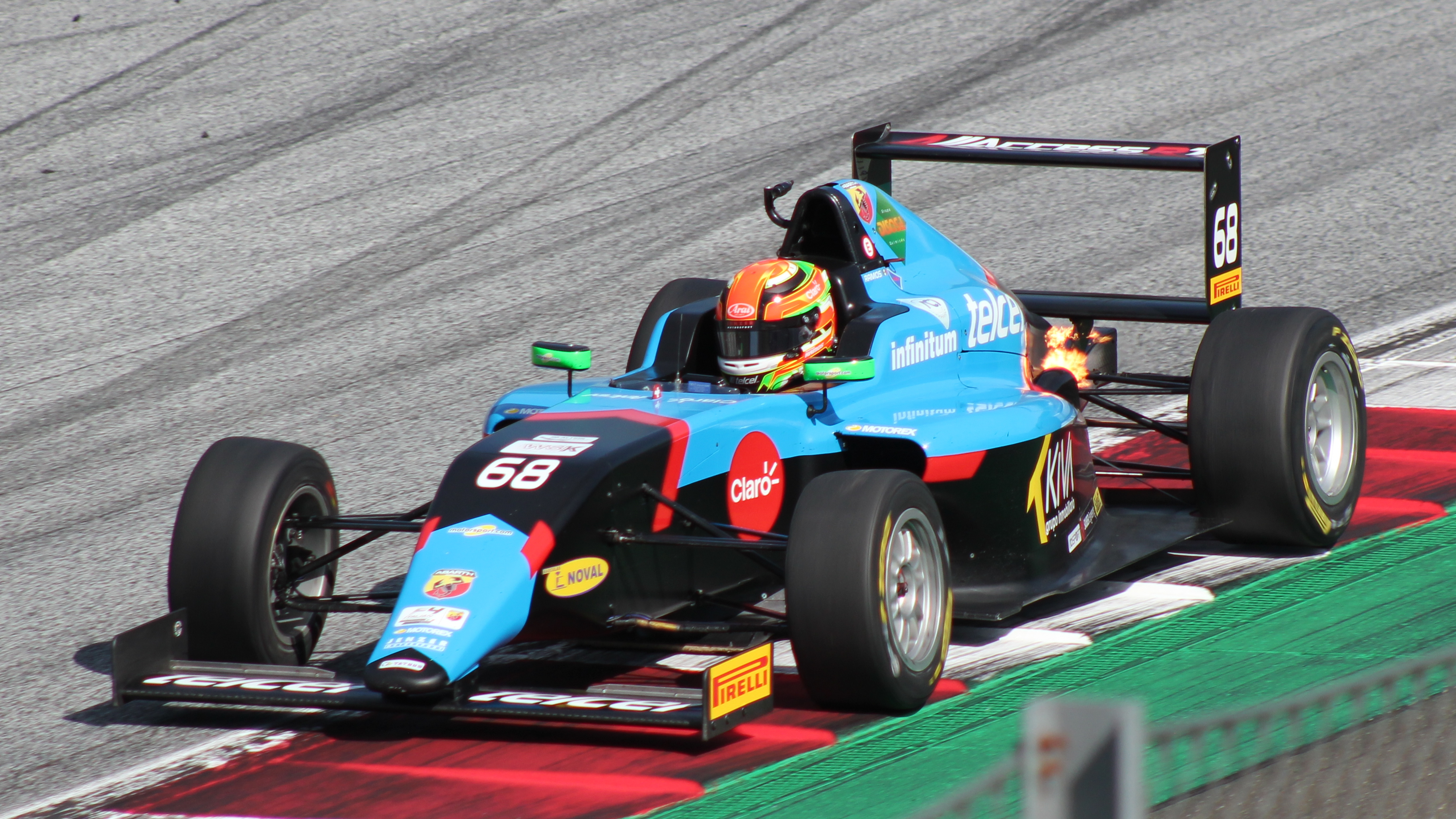
Ramos racing in the 2021 Italian F4 Championship at the Red Bull Ring.

Ramos competed in the final three rounds of the 2019 Italian F4 Championship with DR Formula by RP Motorsport, where he had a highest finish of 20th. He then signed with Jenzer Motorsport to compete in the 2020 Italian F4 Championship, though he would not appear until the fourth round. From then, he scored regular points and finished 16th in the standings, with a best finish of fifth.

In 2021, Ramos continued racing for Jenzer in Italian F4, this time with a view of completing the full season. However, he withdrew from round 2 at the Misano World Circuit due to an injury and did not appear at the following event. He finished 22nd in the standings, having scored on three occasions. Ramos also contested the opening round of the F4 Spanish Championship that year, scoring a podium at Spa.

=== Formula Regional European Championship ===
==== 2022 ====
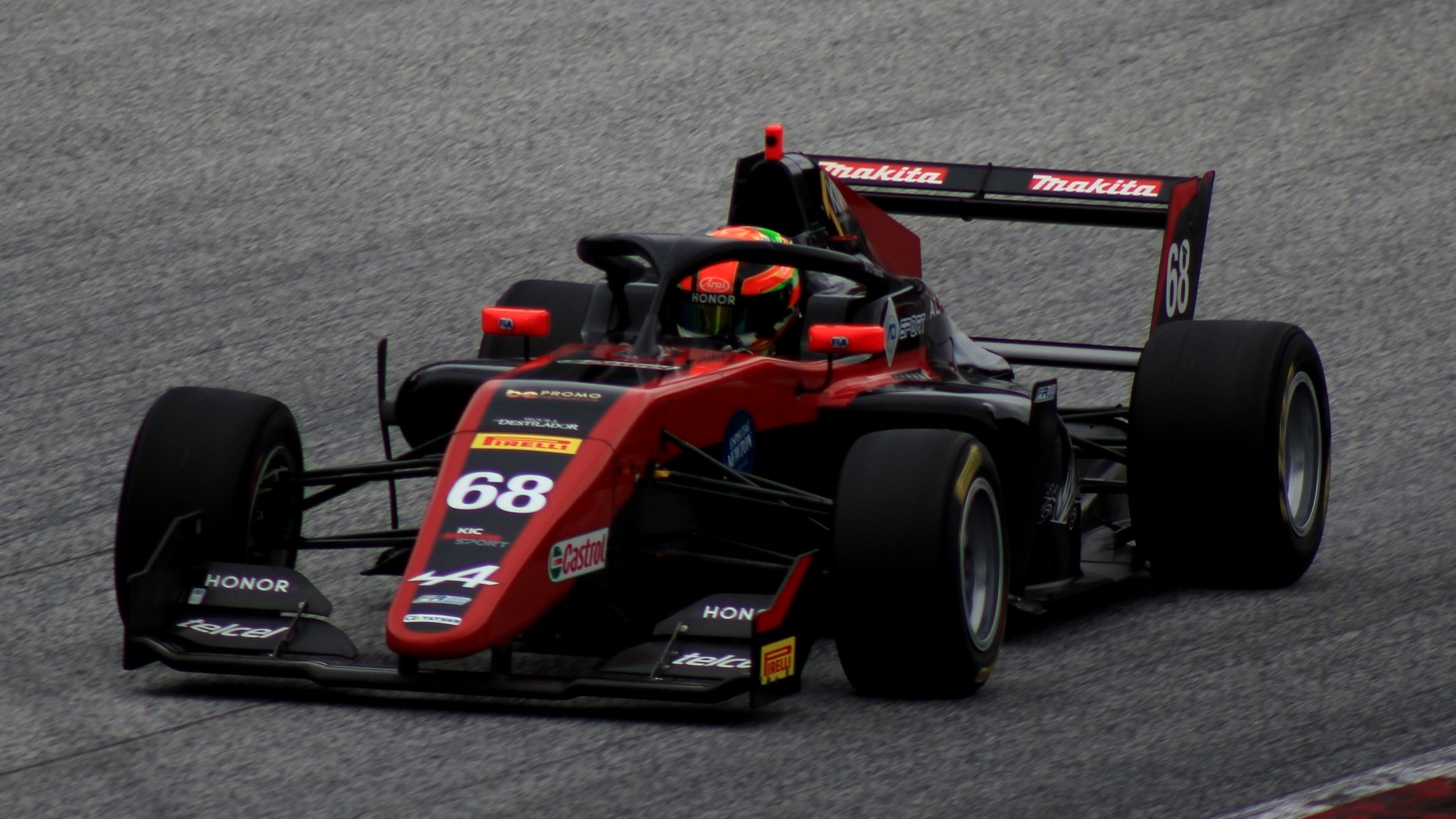
Ramos racing in the 2022 Formula Regional European Championship at the Red Bull Ring.

On 28 February 2022, it was announced that Ramos would step up to the Formula Regional European Championship with KIC Motorsport. Ramos moved to Race Performance Motorsport for the final round at Mugello, and was replaced by William Alatalo. He failed to score points throughout the year and ended up 27th overall.

==== 2023 ====
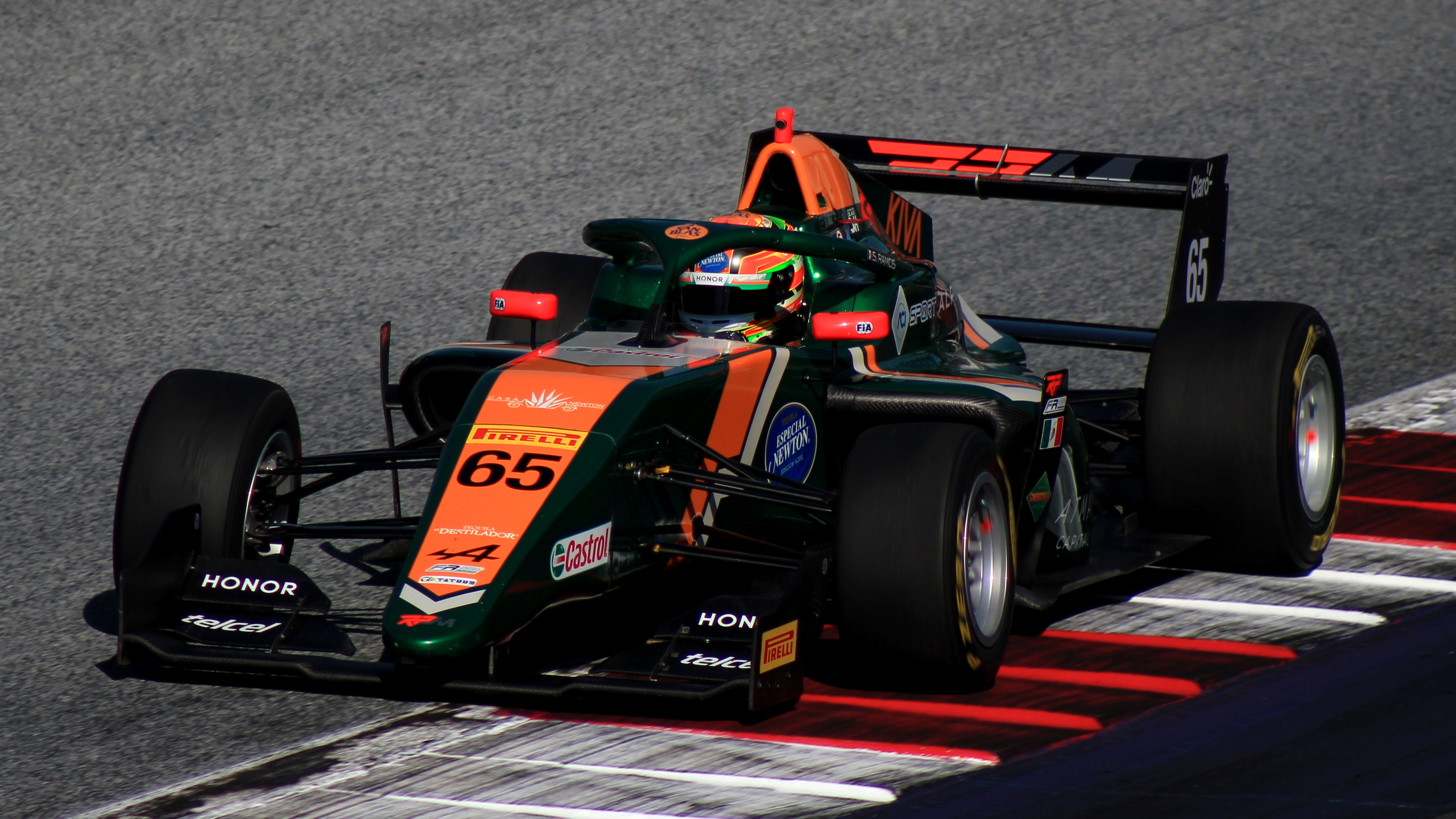
Ramos racing in the 2023 Formula Regional European Championship at the Red Bull Ring.

For 2023, Ramos remained with Race Performance Motorsport for his second season. This year, his results improved markedly, as Ramos went on an early-season scoring streak and even finished on the podium at the Hungaroring thanks to a committed defensive drive versus Michael Belov. His results worsened in the second half of the campaign, which was compounded by him missing the penultimate round at Zandvoort, and Ramos ended up 11th overall.

==== 2025 ====
Ramos returned to the championship in 2025 with RPM during the eighth round in Barcelona.

=== FIA Formula 3 Championship ===
==== 2024 ====
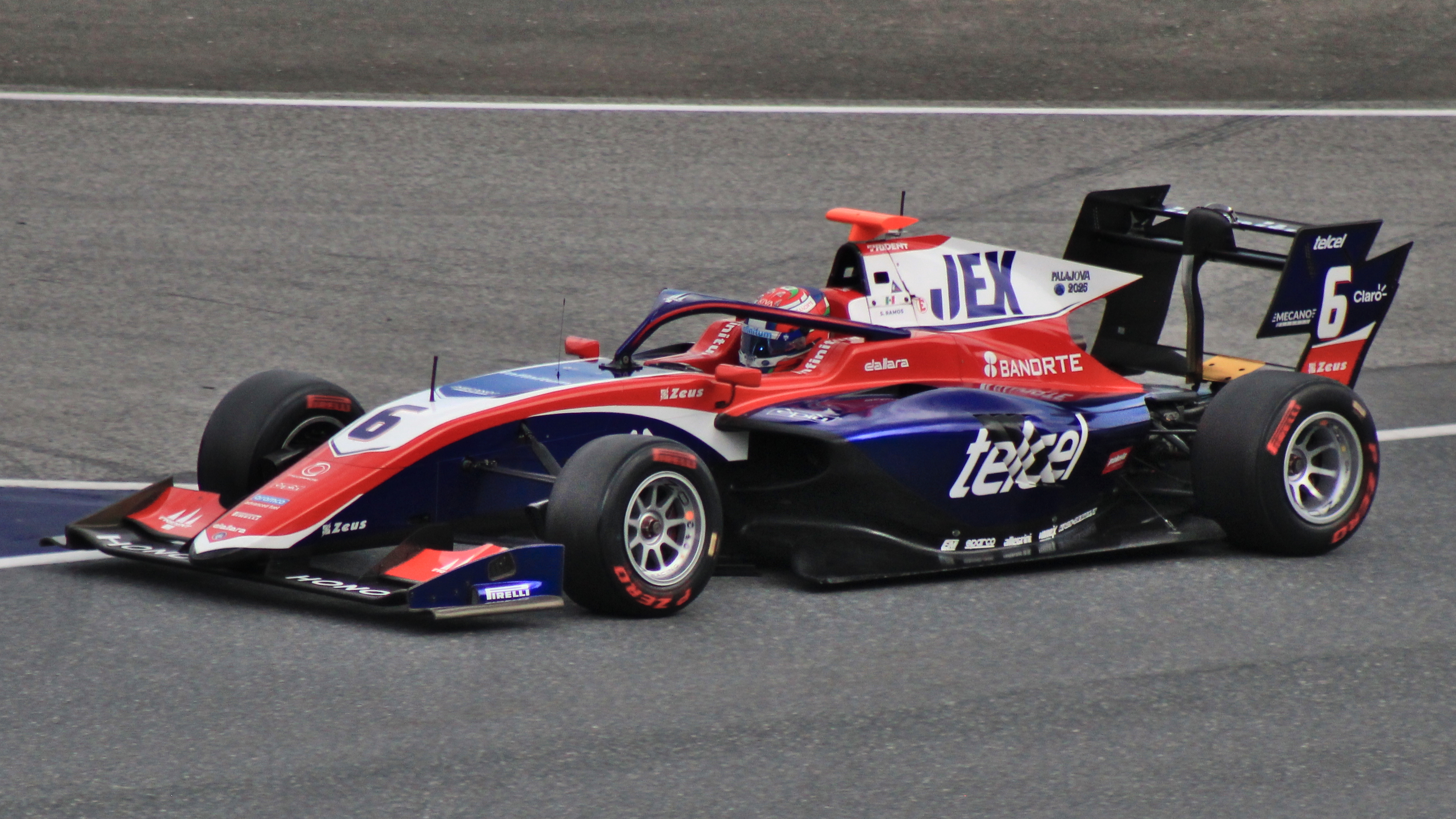
Ramos driving the Dallara F3 2019 during the 2024 Spielberg Formula 3 round

Ramos joined Trident for the Formula 3 post-season testing in preparation for a full season in 2024, where he partnered Leonardo Fornaroli and Sami Meguetounif. His first points came in the Sakhir feature race with a fifth place. At the following round in Melbourne Ramos was penalised for rejoining the track in an unsafe manner during the feature event and ended both races in 24th. Imola heralded his most notable performance of the year, as Ramos led a Trident 1-2-3 in qualifying. Ramos held the lead at the start but was soon passed by Fornaroli and Oliver Goethe, before dropping to eighth by the flag thanks to struggles with tyre wear.

No points at Monaco were followed by a missed opportunity during the Barcelona sprint race, where Ramos led after the first lap before being taken out of contention by teammate Meguetounif. Ramos finished tenth in the feature race but went two rounds without scoring thereafter, only getting back to the top ten with fifth place during the feature race in Budapest. At Spa, Ramos finished eighth in both races, despite suffering a five-second penalty for exceeding track limits on Saturday. Ramos concluded his season by finishing second in the Monza sprint race, claiming the place thanks to a penalty given to Sebastián Montoya for pushing Ramos off the track. He finished 16th in the championship, last of the Trident drivers.

==== 2025 ====
On January 26—his 21st birthday—it was announced that Ramos would move to Van Amersfoort Racing for the 2025 FIA Formula 3 season, joined by Théophile Naël and Ivan Domingues. He won the opening race of the season in Melbourne from reverse grid pole. A handful of non-points finishes and retirements followed before he returned to form in Imola, where he qualified on the front row and overtook Rafael Câmara to win the feature race. Prior to the Monza season finale, Ramos suddenly left Van Amersfoort Racing and was replaced by James Hedley.

=== Retirement ===
Ramos failed to find a racing seat for 2026, and in August 2026, he announced his retirement from racing in an Instagram post.

== Karting record ==
=== Karting career summary ===
Season	Series	Team	Position
2017	SKUSA SuperNationals XXI - Mini Swift Class	Team Benik	31st
2019	SKUSA SuperNationals XXIII - X30 Senior		N/A
2019	German Karting Championship - OK	DR Srl	N/A
2019	WSK Euro Series - OK	DR Srl	56th

== Racing record ==
=== Racing career summary ===
Season	Series	Team	Races	Wins	Poles	F/Laps	Podiums	Points	Position
2019	Italian F4 Championship	DR Formula by RP Motorsport	9	0	0	0	0	0	41st
2020	Italian F4 Championship	Jenzer Motorsport	11	0	0	0	0	26	16th
2021	Italian F4 Championship	Jenzer Motorsport	15	0	0	0	0	15	22nd
2021	F4 Spanish Championship	Jenzer Motorsport	3	0	0	0	1	31	15th
2021	ADAC Formula 4 Championship	Jenzer Motorsport	0	0	0	0	0	0	NC†
2022	Formula Regional European Championship	KIC Motorsport	17	0	0	0	0	0	27th
2022	Formula Regional European Championship	RPM	2	0	0	0	0	0	27th
2023	Formula Regional European Championship	RPM	17	0	0	1	1	67	11th
2024	FIA Formula 3 Championship	Trident	20	0	1	0	1	44	16th
2025	FIA Formula 3 Championship	Van Amersfoort Racing	17	2	0	0	3	48	15th
2025	Formula Regional European Championship	RPM	2	0	0	0	0	0	NC†

* Season still in progress.

† As Ramos was a guest driver, he was ineligible for points.

=== Complete Italian F4 Championship results ===
(key) (Races in bold indicate pole position) (Races in italics indicate fastest lap)

Year	Team	1	2	3	4	5	6	7	8	9	10	11	12	13	14	15	16	17	18	19	20	21	22	Pos	Points
2019	DR Formula by RP Motorsport	VLL; 1	VLL; 2	VLL; 3	MIS; 1	MIS; 2	MIS; 3	HUN; 1	HUN; 2	HUN; 3	RBR; 1	RBR; 2	RBR; 3	IMO; 1 Ret	IMO; 2; 22	IMO; 3; 28	IMO; 4	MUG; 1; 20	MUG; 2; 23	MUG; 3; 26	MNZ; 1; 24	MNZ; 2; 29	MNZ; 3; 19	41st	0
2020	Jenzer Motorsport	MIS; 1	MIS; 2	MIS; 3	IMO1; 1	IMO1; 2	IMO1; 3	RBR; 1	RBR; 2	RBR; 3	MUG; 1; 10	MUG; 2; 14	MUG; 3; 10	MNZ; 1; 9	MNZ; 2; 5	MNZ; 3; 5	IMO2; 1; 13	IMO2; 2; 9	IMO2; 3; 13	VLL; 1; 22	VLL; 2 C	VLL; 3; 11		16th	26
2021	Jenzer Motorsport	LEC; 1; 12	LEC; 2; 12	LEC; 3; 12	MIS; 1 WD	MIS; 2 WD	MIS; 3 WD	VLL; 1	VLL; 2	VLL; 3	IMO; 1; 12	IMO; 2; 22	IMO; 3; 15	RBR; 1; 16	RBR; 2; 15	RBR; 3 Ret	MUG; 1; 8	MUG; 2 Ret	MUG; 3; 5	MNZ; 1; 14	MNZ; 2; 12	MNZ; 3; 10		22nd	15

=== Complete F4 Spanish Championship results ===
(key) (Races in bold indicate pole position) (Races in italics indicate fastest lap)

Year	Team	1	2	3	4	5	6	7	8	9	10	11	12	13	14	15	16	17	18	19	20	21	Pos	Points
2021	Jenzer Motorsport	SPA; 1; 6	SPA; 2; 4	SPA; 3; 3	NAV; 1	NAV; 2	NAV; 3	ALG; 1	ALG; 2	ALG; 3	ARA; 1	ARA; 2	ARA; 3	CRT; 1	CRT; 2	CRT; 3	JER; 1	JER; 2	JER; 3	CAT; 1	CAT; 2	CAT; 3	15th	31

=== Complete Formula Regional European Championship results ===
(key) (Races in bold indicate pole position) (Races in italics indicate fastest lap)

Year	Team	1	2	3	4	5	6	7	8	9	10	11	12	13	14	15	16	17	18	19	20	DC	Points
2022	KIC Motorsport	MNZ; 1; 25	MNZ; 2 Ret	IMO; 1; 32	IMO; 2; 19	MCO; 1; 23	MCO; 2 DNQ	LEC; 1; 22	LEC; 2; 16	ZAN; 1; 22	ZAN; 2; 22	HUN; 1; 20	HUN; 2; 27	SPA; 1; 12	SPA; 2 Ret	RBR; 1; 24	RBR; 2; 22	CAT; 1; 33†	CAT; 2; 26			27th	0
2022	RPM																			MUG; 1; 18	MUG; 2; 19	27th	0
2023	RPM	IMO; 1; 23	IMO; 2; 6	CAT; 1 Ret	CAT; 2; 4	HUN; 1; 3	HUN; 2; 8	SPA; 1; 8	SPA; 2; 10	MUG; 1; 12	MUG; 2; 4	LEC; 1 Ret	LEC; 2; 6	RBR; 1; 29	RBR; 2 Ret	MNZ; 1; 15	MNZ; 2; 22	ZAN; 1 WD	ZAN; 2 WD	HOC; 1; 10	HOC; 2 DNS	11th	67
2025	RPM	MIS; 1	MIS; 2	SPA; 1	SPA; 2	ZAN; 1	ZAN; 2	HUN; 1	HUN; 2	LEC; 1	LEC; 2	IMO; 1	IMO; 2	RBR; 1	RBR; 2	CAT; 1; 14	CAT; 2; 20	HOC; 1	HOC; 2	MNZ; 1	MNZ; 2	NC†	0

† As Ramos was a guest driver, he was ineligible for points.

=== Complete FIA Formula 3 Championship results ===
(key) (Races in bold indicate pole position) (Races in italics indicate fastest lap)

Year	Entrant	1	2	3	4	5	6	7	8	9	10	11	12	13	14	15	16	17	18	19	20	DC	Points
2024	Trident	BHR; SPR; 21	BHR; FEA; 5	MEL; SPR; 24	MEL; FEA; 24	IMO; SPR; 10	**IMO**; **FEA**; 8	MON; SPR; 15	MON; FEA; 14	CAT; SPR; 21	CAT; FEA; 10	RBR; SPR; 24	RBR; FEA; 13	SIL; SPR; 19	SIL; FEA; 16	HUN; SPR; 28	HUN; FEA; 5	SPA; SPR; 8	SPA; FEA; 8	MNZ; SPR; 2	MNZ; FEA; 18	16th	44
2025	Van Amersfoort Racing	MEL; SPR; 1	MEL; FEA; 16	BHR; SPR; Ret	BHR; FEA; 14	IMO; SPR; 27†	IMO; FEA; 1	MON; SPR; Ret	MON; FEA; 16	CAT; SPR; 2	CAT; FEA; Ret	RBR; SPR; 13	RBR; FEA; 27	SIL; SPR; 15	SIL; FEA; 8	SPA; SPR; 21	SPA; FEA; C	HUN; SPR; 12	HUN; FEA; 19	MNZ; SPR	MNZ; FEA	15th	48
