= 2019 Ginetta Junior Championship =

The 2019 Michelin Ginetta Junior Championship was a multi-event, one make motor racing championship held in England and Scotland. The championship featured a mix of professional motor racing teams and privately funded drivers, aged between 14 and 17, competing in Ginetta G40s that conformed to the technical regulations for the championship. It forms part of the extensive program of support categories built up around the British Touring Car Championship centrepiece. It was the thirteenth Ginetta Junior Championship, and the first with new title sponsor Michelin, commencing on 6 April 2019 at Brands Hatch – on the circuit's Indy configuration – and concluding on 13 October 2019 at the same venue, utilising the Grand Prix circuit, after ten meetings, all in support of the 2019 British Touring Car Championship.

== Teams and Drivers ==
Team	No.	Driver	Rounds
Richardson Racing	10	(United Kingdom) Will Martin	All
Richardson Racing	25	(United Kingdom) Casper Stevenson	All
Richardson Racing	66	(United Kingdom) James Taylor	1–6
Richardson Racing	40	(United Kingdom) Ethan Hawkey	6–10
Total Control Racing	11	(United Kingdom) Will Rochford	1–5
Total Control Racing	40	(United Kingdom) Ethan Hawkey	1–5
Total Control Racing	54	(United Kingdom) Theo Edgerton	1–6
Total Control Racing	68	(United Kingdom) Daniel Gale	1–5, 9–10
Total Control Racing	75	(Kuwait) Haytham Qarajouli	All
Total Control Racing	86	(United Kingdom) Ethan Brooks	1–2, 4, 6–10
Elite Motorsport	16	(United Kingdom) William Aspin	6
Elite Motorsport	17	(United Kingdom) Tom Ward	4, 6
Elite Motorsport	27	(United Kingdom) Tom Emson	1–8
Elite Motorsport	29	(United Kingdom) Joel Pearson	1–8
Elite Motorsport	52	(Morocco) Suleiman Zanfari	9–10
Elite Motorsport	66	(United Kingdom) James Taylor	7–10
Elite Motorsport	67	(United Kingdom) James Hedley	All
Premiership Academy Racing	20	(United Kingdom) Harry Dyson	1–5
Premiership Academy Racing	37	(United Kingdom) Charlie McLeod	1–2
Premiership Academy Racing	47	(United Kingdom) Molly Dodd	All
Premiership Academy Racing	95	(United Kingdom) Ben O'Hare	All
In2Racing	21	(United Kingdom) Josh Rattican	1–5
In2Racing	35	(United Kingdom) Ben Kasperczak	1–3
In2Racing	55	(United Kingdom) Roman Biliński	1–2
In2Racing	37	(United Kingdom) Charlie McLeod	3
R Racing	21	(United Kingdom) Josh Rattican	6–10
R Racing	29	(United Kingdom) Joel Pearson	9–10
R Racing	51	(United Kingdom) Zak O'Sullivan	6–10
R Racing	70	(United Kingdom) Aston Millar	6, 9–10
Douglas Motorsport	22	(Switzerland) Bailey Voisin	All
Douglas Motorsport	23	(United Kingdom) Lorcan Hanafin	All
Douglas Motorsport	51	(United Kingdom) Zak O'Sullivan	1–5
Douglas Motorsport	57	(United Kingdom) Gustav Burton	All
Douglas Motorsport	62	(United Kingdom) Freddie Tomlinson	All
SVG Motorsport	32	(United Kingdom) Frankie Taylor	1–8
Team HARD	32	(United Kingdom) Frankie Taylor	9–10
Privateer	35	(United Kingdom) Ben Kasperczak	4–8
Privateer	88	(United Kingdom) Kieran Fuller	9
Alastair Rushforth Motorsport	55	(United Kingdom) Roman Biliński	3–7
Alastair Rushforth Motorsport	99	(United Kingdom) Zak Taylor	7, 9–10
Race Car Consultants	59	(United Kingdom) Nat Hodgkiss	6, 10

== Race Calendar ==
Round	Circuit	Date	Pole position	Fastest lap	Winning driver	Winning team	Rookie winner
1	Brands Hatch (Indy Circuit, Kent)	6 April	(United Kingdom) James Hedley	(United Kingdom) James Hedley	(United Kingdom) James Taylor	Richardson Racing	(United Kingdom) Zak O'Sullivan
1	Brands Hatch (Indy Circuit, Kent)	7 April	(United Kingdom) Zak O'Sullivan	(United Kingdom) James Hedley	(United Kingdom) Tom Emson	Elite Motorsport	(United Kingdom) Theo Edgerton
2	Donington Park (National Circuit, Leicestershire)	27 April	(United Kingdom) Roman Biliński	(United Kingdom) James Hedley	(United Kingdom) James Hedley	Elite Motorsport	(United Kingdom) Zak O'Sullivan
2	Donington Park (National Circuit, Leicestershire)	28 April	(United Kingdom) Roman Biliński	(United Kingdom) James Hedley	(United Kingdom) James Taylor	Richardson Racing	(United Kingdom) Theo Edgerton
2	Donington Park (National Circuit, Leicestershire)	28 April		(United Kingdom) James Hedley	(United Kingdom) James Hedley	Elite Motorsport	(United Kingdom) Zak O'Sullivan
3	Thruxton Circuit (Hampshire)	19 May	(United Kingdom) James Hedley	(United Kingdom) James Hedley	(United Kingdom) Will Martin	Richardson Racing	(United Kingdom) Zak O'Sullivan
3	Thruxton Circuit (Hampshire)	19 May	(United Kingdom) James Hedley	(United Kingdom) Zak O'Sullivan	(United Kingdom) James Hedley	Elite Motorsport	(United Kingdom) Zak O'Sullivan
4	Croft Circuit (North Yorkshire)	15 June	Race cancelled due to heavy rain. Hosted at Snetterton instead.				
4	Croft Circuit (North Yorkshire)	16 June	(United Kingdom) James Hedley	(United Kingdom) James Hedley	(United Kingdom) Will Martin	Richardson Racing	(United Kingdom) Casper Stevenson
5	Oulton Park (Island Circuit, Cheshire)	30 June	(United Kingdom) Will Martin	(United Kingdom) Ethan Hawkey	(United Kingdom) Will Martin	Richardson Racing	(United Kingdom) Casper Stevenson
5	Oulton Park (Island Circuit, Cheshire)	30 June	(United Kingdom) Will Martin	(United Kingdom) Will Martin	(United Kingdom) Will Martin	Richardson Racing	(United Kingdom) Casper Stevenson
6	Snetterton Circuit (300 Circuit, Norfolk)	3 August	(United Kingdom) Will Martin	(United Kingdom) Will Martin	(United Kingdom) Will Martin	Richardson Racing	(United Kingdom) Casper Stevenson
6	Snetterton Circuit (300 Circuit, Norfolk)	3 August	(United Kingdom) James Hedley	(United Kingdom) Zak O'Sullivan	(United Kingdom) Will Martin	Richardson Racing	(United Kingdom) Casper Stevenson
6	Snetterton Circuit (300 Circuit, Norfolk)	4 August	(United Kingdom) Zak O'Sullivan	(United Kingdom) Will Martin	(United Kingdom) Zak O'Sullivan	R Racing	(United Kingdom) Zak O'Sullivan
6	Snetterton Circuit (300 Circuit, Norfolk)	4 August		(United Kingdom) Zak O'Sullivan	(United Kingdom) Zak O'Sullivan	R Racing	(United Kingdom) Zak O'Sullivan
7	Thruxton Circuit (Hampshire)	17 August	(United Kingdom) James Hedley	(United Kingdom) James Hedley	(United Kingdom) James Hedley	Elite Motorsport	(United Kingdom) Zak O'Sullivan
7	Thruxton Circuit (Hampshire)	17 August	(United Kingdom) James Hedley	(United Kingdom) James Hedley	(United Kingdom) Zak O'Sullivan	R Racing	(United Kingdom) Zak O'Sullivan
7	Thruxton Circuit (Hampshire)	18 August		(United Kingdom) James Hedley	(United Kingdom) Will Martin	Richardson Racing	(United Kingdom) Zak O'Sullivan
8	Knockhill Racing Circuit (Fife)	14 September	(United Kingdom) Will Martin	(United Kingdom) Will Martin	(United Kingdom) James Hedley	Elite Motorsport	(United Kingdom) Casper Stevenson
8	Knockhill Racing Circuit (Fife)	15 September	(United Kingdom) Will Martin	(United Kingdom) Zak O'Sullivan	(United Kingdom) James Hedley	Elite Motorsport	(United Kingdom) Zak O'Sullivan
8	Knockhill Racing Circuit (Fife)	15 September		(United Kingdom) Gustav Burton	(United Kingdom) Lorcan Hanafin	Douglas Motorsport	(United Kingdom) Zak O'Sullivan
9	Silverstone Circuit (National Circuit, Northamptonshire)	28 September	(United Kingdom) James Hedley	(United Kingdom) Lorcan Hanafin	(United Kingdom) Will Martin	Richardson Racing	(United Kingdom) Zak O'Sullivan
9	Silverstone Circuit (National Circuit, Northamptonshire)	29 September	(United Kingdom) James Hedley	(United Kingdom) Lorcan Hanafin	(United Kingdom) James Taylor	Elite Motorsport	(United Kingdom) Zak O'Sullivan
9	Silverstone Circuit (National Circuit, Northamptonshire)	29 September		(United Kingdom) James Hedley	(United Kingdom) James Taylor	Elite Motorsport	(United Kingdom) Joel Pearson
10	Brands Hatch (Grand Prix Circuit, Kent)	12 October	(United Kingdom) James Hedley	(United Kingdom) Will Martin	(United Kingdom) James Hedley	Elite Motorsport	(United Kingdom) Ethan Brooks
10	Brands Hatch (Grand Prix Circuit, Kent)	12 October	(United Kingdom) James Hedley	(United Kingdom) Ethan Brooks	(United Kingdom) Lorcan Hanafin	Douglas Motorsport	(United Kingdom) Ethan Brooks
10	Brands Hatch (Grand Prix Circuit, Kent)	13 October		(United Kingdom) James Hedley	(United Kingdom) Will Martin	Richardson Racing	(United Kingdom) Ethan Brooks

== Championship standings ==
Points system
1st	2nd	3rd	4th	5th	6th	7th	8th	9th	10th	11th	12th	13th	14th	15th	16th	17th	18th	19th	20th	R1 PP	FL
35	30	26	22	20	18	16	14	12	11	10	9	8	7	6	5	4	3	2	1	1	1

=== Drivers' championship ===
- A driver's best 24 scores counted towards the championship, with any other points being discarded.

Pos	Driver	BHI		DON			THR1		CRO		OUL		SNE				THR2			KNO			SIL			BHGP			Points
1	(United Kingdom) James Hedley	3	2	1	2	1	4	1	C	2	2	2	6	2	3	2	1	3	(Ret)	1	1	3	(17)	4	4	1	5	5	680
2	(United Kingdom) Zak O'Sullivan (R)	2	9	2	8	2	2	2	C	8	(11)	7	4	4	1	1	2	1	2	3	2	2	2	5	9	5	Ret	7	591
3	(United Kingdom) Will Martin	6	8	DNS	5	7	1	22	C	1	1	1	1	1	5	4	16	2	1	Ret	8	19	1	6	5	3	Ret	1	524
4	(United Kingdom) Lorcan Hanafin	9	3	8	6	4	6	16	C	13	4	4	5	13	Ret	9	3	Ret	3	7	12	1	4	2	2	6	1	2	480
5	(United Kingdom) James Taylor	1	Ret	4	1	3	15	12	C	4	Ret	Ret	9	10	9	10	Ret	10	9	4	4	6	3	1	1	2	2	6	461
6	(United Kingdom) Casper Stevenson (R)	7	Ret	7	7	9	10	3	C	3	3	3	2	3	2	14	6	4	4	2	3	10	10	21	12	Ret	10	8	427
7	(United Kingdom) Gustav Burton	5	Ret	5	3	5	5	5	C	5	22	9	3	5	4	11	13	8	5	10	5	4	6	3	3	7	6	Ret	412
8	(United Kingdom) Ethan Hawkey	Ret	5	Ret	10	6	3	4	C	7	5	10	7	9	11	6	9	14	8	Ret	10	5	12	14	10	8	9	4	319
9	(United Kingdom) Josh Rattican (R)	11	7	6	9	15	8	8	C	Ret	6	6	13	12	6	5	Ret	6	6	9	9	11	8	9	7	9	Ret	10	316
10	(United Kingdom) Joel Pearson (R)	13	Ret	11	13	11	11	10	C	18	9	5	8	16	14	8	4	5	11	6	7	8	Ret	7	6	Ret	4	13	296
11	(United Kingdom) Tom Emson	8	1	19	14	8	7	7	C	19	7	13	14	7	13	21	10	Ret	7	14	6	7							229
12	(United Kingdom) Ethan Brooks (R)	Ret	Ret	Ret	18	Ret			C	9	13	15	12	14	10	Ret	8	7	13	8	11	13	Ret	8	Ret	4	3	3	209
13	(Switzerland) Bailey Voisin (R)	16	Ret	13	16	16	19	20	C	12	14	12	18	20	18	19	7	9	10	11	Ret	12	11	20	16	12	8	11	161
14	(United Kingdom) Theo Edgerton (R)	4	4	3	4	Ret	14	9	C	6	15	8	11	8	DNS	DNS													158
15	(United Kingdom) Ben O'Hare	12	13	Ret	12	Ret	18	18	C	Ret	18	14	19	17	12	13	5	Ret	12	16	14	15	14	13	11	10	7	Ret	158
16	(United Kingdom) Ben Kasperczak (R)	21	Ret	15	11	Ret	22	Ret	C	10	21	11	10	11	8	7	Ret	11	14	5	Ret	9	9	10	Ret	Ret	15	18	148
17	(United Kingdom) Frankie Taylor (R)	15	10	16	Ret	13	12	19	C	14	19	Ret	Ret	18	16	15	11	12	16	13	Ret	14	13	17	19	14	Ret	15	124
18	(United Kingdom) Freddie Tomlinson (R)	18	15	17	19	18	Ret	15	C	11	12	Ret	16	19	17	17	14	13	15	15	13	16	16	12	14	16	17	16	124
19	(Kuwait) Haytham Qarajouli (R)	DNS	18	10	15	20	20	13	C	15	16	17	17	Ret	19	Ret	12	Ret	DNS	12	Ret	18	7	11	8	Ret	Ret	9	112
20	(United Kingdom) Roman Biliński	DNS	11	DSQ	Ret	10	13	6	C	20	8	DNS	15	6	7	3	Ret	Ret	DNS										87
21	(United Kingdom) Daniel Gale (R)	14	14	Ret	17	14	16	14	C	Ret	10	Ret											19	15	13	Ret	12	Ret	67
22	(United Kingdom) Molly Dodd (R)	19	17	18	22	19	23	23	C	17	20	16	21	21	20	20	17	16	17	17	Ret	17	15	Ret	18	15	16	19	66
23	(United Kingdom) Harry Dyson	10	6	9	Ret	12	9	11	C	Ret																			60
24	(United Kingdom) Aston Millar (R)												Ret		Ret	12							5	Ret	15	11	Ret	12	54
25	(United Kingdom) Will Rochford (R)	20	16	12	20	Ret	17	21	C	16	17	Ret																	29
26	(United Kingdom) Charlie McLeod (R)	17	12	14	21	17	21	17																					28
27	(Morocco) Suleiman Zanfari (R)																						18	16	17	17	13	17	28
28	(United Kingdom) Nat Hodgkiss (R)												Ret		DNS	DNS										13	14	14	22
29	(United Kingdom) Zak Taylor (R)																15	15	Ret				21	19	Ret	18	11	Ret	18
30	(United Kingdom) Tom Ward (R)								C	Ret			Ret	15	15	16													17
31	(United Kingdom) William Aspin (R)												20		Ret	18													4
32	(United Kingdom) Kieran Fuller (R)																						20	18	DSQ				4
