= 2025 Barcelona Formula 3 round =

Motor racing event

(Spain) 2025 Barcelona Formula 3 round
Round details
- Round 5 of 10 in the 2025 FIA Formula 3 Championship.
- Location: Circuit de Barcelona-Catalunya, Montmeló, Catalonia, Spain
- Course: Permanent racing facility 4.657 km (2.894 mi)

Sprint Race
- Date: 31 May 2025
- Laps: 21
Podium
First	(Portugal) Ivan Domingues	Van Amersfoort Racing
Second	(Mexico) Santiago Ramos	Van Amersfoort Racing
Third	(Bulgaria) Nikola Tsolov	Campos Racing
Fastest lap
Driver	(Denmark) Noah Strømsted	Trident
- Time: 1:32.018 (on lap 15)

Feature Race
- Date: 1 June 2025
- Laps: 25
Pole position
Driver	(Brazil) Rafael Câmara	Trident
Time	1:28.761	
Podium
First	(Brazil) Rafael Câmara	Trident
Second	(France) Théophile Naël	Van Amersfoort Racing
Third	(France) Alessandro Giusti	MP Motorsport
Fastest lap
Driver	(Brazil) Rafael Câmara	Trident
- Time: 1:31.350 (on lap 8)

The 2025 Barcelona Formula 3 round was a motor racing event held between 30 May and 1 June 2025 at the Circuit de Barcelona-Catalunya. It was the fifth round of the 2025 FIA Formula 3 Championship and was held in support of the 2025 Spanish Grand Prix.

Championship leader and rookie Rafael Câmara took his fourth pole position in a season, becoming the first driver to do so. However, a crash at the start between him and fellow rookie Tuukka Taponen saw him going pointless in the fourth sprint race of the season. In a race, that also saw championship runner-up Tim Tramnitz retiring after a collision at the start, would bring up a new race winner with Ivan Domingues. Santiago Ramos completed the maiden 1-2 finish for Van Amersfoort Racing in a Formula 3 race, with Nikola Tsolov settling for third place. The next day, Câmara crossed the line to win his third feature race of the season, with Théophile Naël in the third Van Amersfoort car and Alessandro Giusti finishing second and third, respectively. Additionally, it was Giusti's maiden podium in FIA Formula 3.

Following the conclusion of this round, Câmara extended his lead by 26 points over Tsolov, who overtook Tramnitz in the standings for second place, with Trident also extending its lead in their respective championship by 46 points over Campos Racing.

== Classification ==
=== Qualifying ===
Qualifying was held on 30 May 2025, at 15:00 local time (UTC+2).

Pos.	No.	Driver	Team	Time/Gap	Grid SR	Grid FR
1	5	(Brazil) Rafael Câmara	Trident	1:28.761	12	1
2	12	(Bulgaria) Nikola Tsolov	Campos Racing	+0.216	11	2
3	7	(Netherlands) Laurens van Hoepen	ART Grand Prix	+0.345	10	3
4	20	(France) Théophile Naël	Van Amersfoort Racing	+0.353	9	4
5	21	(Mexico) Santiago Ramos	Van Amersfoort Racing	+0.389	8	5
6	19	(France) Alessandro Giusti	MP Motorsport	+0.434	7	6
7	22	(Portugal) Ivan Domingues	Van Amersfoort Racing	+0.514	6	7
8	4	(Denmark) Noah Strømsted	Trident	+0.530	5	8
9	8	(Finland) Tuukka Taponen	ART Grand Prix	+0.534	4	9
10	17	(Germany) Tim Tramnitz	MP Motorsport	+0.566	3	13^{1}
11	14	(Norway) Martinius Stenshorne	Hitech TGR	+0.578	2	10
12	25	(Poland) Roman Bilinski	Rodin Motorsport	+0.618	1	11
13	9	(Australia) James Wharton	ART Grand Prix	+0.622	13	12
14	2	(Mexico) Noel León	Prema Racing	+0.629	14	14
15	10	(Spain) Mari Boya	Campos Racing	+0.671	15	15
16	11	(Thailand) Tasanapol Inthraphuvasak	Campos Racing	+0.672	19^{2}	19^{2}
17	23	(United Kingdom) Callum Voisin	Rodin Motorsport	+0.681	16	16
18	24	(New Zealand) Louis Sharp	Rodin Motorsport	+0.704	17	17
19	6	(Austria) Charlie Wurz	Trident	+0.724	18	18
20	18	(Spain) Bruno del Pino	MP Motorsport	+0.754	20	20
21	28	(United States) Brad Benavides	AIX Racing	+0.754	21	21
22	1	(Italy) Brando Badoer	Prema Racing	+0.790	22	22
23	31	(Singapore) Christian Ho	DAMS Lucas Oil	+0.866	23	23
24	3	(United States) Ugo Ugochukwu	Prema Racing	+0.938	24	24
25	26	(Mexico) José Garfias	AIX Racing	+0.955	25	25
26	29	(Italy) Nicola Lacorte	DAMS Lucas Oil	+0.993	30^{3}	30^{3}
27	15	(Mexico) Jesse Carrasquedo Jr.	Hitech TGR	+1.214	26	26
28	27	(Italy) Nicola Marinangeli	AIX Racing	+1.265	27	27
29	30	(Peru) Matías Zagazeta	DAMS Lucas Oil	+1.395	28	28
30	16	(China) Gerrard Xie	Hitech TGR	+1.338	29	29
107% time: 1:34.974 (+6.213)

Notes

- ^1 – Tim Tramnitz was given a three-place grid penalty after the sprint race for causing a collision.
- ^2 – Tasanapol Inthraphuvasak was given a three-place grid penalty for both races for impeding Alessandro Giusti during qualifying.
- ^3 – Nicola Lacorte was given a ten-place grid penalty for both races for causing a collision during qualifying.

=== Sprint race ===
The Sprint race was held on 31 May 2025, at 10:05 local time (UTC+2).

Pos.	No.	Driver	Team	Laps	Time/Gap	Grid	Pts.
1	22	(Portugal) Ivan Domingues	Van Amersfoort Racing	21	35:54.369	6	10
2	21	(Mexico) Santiago Ramos	Van Amersfoort Racing	21	+2.108	8	9 (1)
3	12	(Bulgaria) Nikola Tsolov	Campos Racing	21	+4.292	11	8
4	7	(Netherlands) Laurens van Hoepen	ART Grand Prix	21	+8.429	10	7
5	20	(France) Théophile Naël	Van Amersfoort Racing	21	+9.906	9	6
6	19	(France) Alessandro Giusti	MP Motorsport	21	+12.038	7	5
7	10	(Spain) Mari Boya	Campos Racing	21	+14.560	15	4
8	9	(Australia) James Wharton	ART Grand Prix	21	+18.548	13	3
9	11	(Thailand) Tasanapol Inthraphuvasak	Campos Racing	21	+18.990	19	2
10	2	(Mexico) Noel León	Prema Racing	21	+22.413	14	1
11	31	(Singapore) Christian Ho	DAMS Lucas Oil	21	+23.203	23	
12	18	(Spain) Bruno del Pino	MP Motorsport	21	+23.783	20	
13	24	(New Zealand) Louis Sharp	Rodin Motorsport	21	+25.140	17	
14	6	(Austria) Charlie Wurz	Trident	21	+26.452	18	
15	28	(United States) Brad Benavides	AIX Racing	21	+27.442	21	
16	23	(United Kingdom) Callum Voisin	Rodin Motorsport	21	+28.639	16	
17	1	(Italy) Brando Badoer	Prema Racing	21	+30.846	22	
18	30	(Peru) Matías Zagazeta	DAMS Lucas Oil	21	+31.426	28	
19	29	(Italy) Nicola Lacorte	DAMS Lucas Oil	21	+32.524	30	
20	16	(China) Gerrard Xie	Hitech TGR	21	+36.714	29	
21	27	(Italy) Nicola Marinangeli	AIX Racing	21	+38.784	25	
22	3	(United States) Ugo Ugochukwu	Prema Racing	21	+40.559^{1}	24	
23	16	(Mexico) Jesse Carrasquedo Jr.	Hitech TGR	21	+41.576	26	
24†	26	(Mexico) José Garfias	AIX Racing	19	Lost wheel	25	
DNF	4	(Denmark) Noah Strømsted	Trident	16	Hydraulics	5	
DNF	5	(Brazil) Rafael Câmara	Trident	1	Collision damage	12	
DNF	25	(Poland) Roman Bilinski	Rodin Motorsport	0	Collision	1	
DNF	14	(Norway) Martinius Stenshorne	Hitech TGR	0	Collision	2	
DNF	17	(Germany) Tim Tramnitz	MP Motorsport	0	Collision damage	3	
DNF	8	(Finland) Tuukka Taponen	ART Grand Prix	0	Collision damage	4	
Fastest lap: (Denmark) Noah Strømsted (1:32.018 on lap 15)

Notes

- ^1 – Ugo Ugochukwu originally finished seventeenth, but was later given a ten-second time-penalty for leaving the track and gaining an advantage, demoting to 22nd.

=== Feature race ===
The Feature race was held on 1 June 2025, at 08:30 local time (UTC+2).

Pos.	No.	Driver	Team	Laps	Time/Gap	Grid	Pts.
1	5	(Brazil) Rafael Câmara	Trident	26	43:36.807	1	25 (2+1)
2	20	(France) Théophile Naël	Van Amersfoort Racing	26	+2.130	4	18
3	19	(France) Alessandro Giusti	MP Motorsport	26	+4.054	6	15
4	7	(Netherlands) Laurens van Hoepen	ART Grand Prix	26	+4.878	3	12
5	12	(Bulgaria) Nikola Tsolov	Campos Racing	26	+5.288	2	10
6	22	(Portugal) Ivan Domingues	Van Amersfoort Racing	26	+7.628	7	8
7	17	(Germany) Tim Tramnitz	MP Motorsport	26	+8.374	13	6
8	4	(Denmark) Noah Strømsted	Trident	26	+10.270	8	4
9	14	(Norway) Martinius Stenshorne	Hitech TGR	26	+11.185	10	2
10	23	(United Kingdom) Callum Voisin	Rodin Motorsport	26	+13.278	16	1
11	11	(Thailand) Tasanapol Inthraphuvasak	Campos Racing	26	+14.182	19	
12	24	(New Zealand) Louis Sharp	Rodin Motorsport	26	+14.413	17	
13	6	(Austria) Charlie Wurz	Trident	26	+14.890	18	
14	31	(Singapore) Christian Ho	DAMS Lucas Oil	26	+16.411	23	
15	30	(Peru) Matías Zagazeta	DAMS Lucas Oil	26	+17.116	28	
16	9	(Australia) James Wharton	ART Grand Prix	26	+18.360^{1}	12	
17	18	(Spain) Bruno del Pino	MP Motorsport	26	+19.707^{2}	20	
18	2	(Mexico) Noel León	Prema Racing	26	+20.315	14	
19	8	(Finland) Tuukka Taponen	ART Grand Prix	26	+20.534	9	
20	3	(United States) Ugo Ugochukwu	Prema Racing	26	+21.156	24	
21	16	(China) Gerrard Xie	Hitech TGR	26	+21.768	29	
22	10	(Spain) Mari Boya	Campos Racing	26	+22.337^{3}	15	
23	27	(Italy) Nicola Marinangeli	AIX Racing	26	+24.236	25	
24	28	(United States) Brad Benavides	AIX Racing	26	+42.092^{4}	21	
25	15	(Mexico) Jesse Carrasquedo Jr.	Hitech TGR	26	+51.999^{5}	26	
26†	29	(Italy) Nicola Lacorte	DAMS Lucas Oil	25	Retired	30	
DNF	1	(Italy) Brando Badoer	Prema Racing	18	Collision damage	22	
DNF	26	(Mexico) José Garfias	AIX Racing	3	Collision	25	
DNF	25	(Poland) Roman Bilinski	Rodin Motorsport	3	Collision	11	
DNF	21	(Mexico) Santiago Ramos	Van Amersfoort Racing	2	Back pain	5	
Fastest lap: (Brazil) Rafael Câmara (1:31.350 on lap 8)

Notes:

- ^1 James Wharton received a five-second time penalty for track limits violations. This demoted him from 12th to 16th.
- ^2 Bruno del Pino received a five-second time penalty for track limits violations. This demoted him from 13th to 17th.
- ^3 Mari Boya received a ten-second time penalty for leaving the track and gaining an advantage. This demoted him from 10th to 22nd.
- ^4 Brad Benavides received a five-second time penalty for track limits violations. This did not affect his final classification.
- ^5 Jesse Carrasquedo Jr. received a ten-second stop and go penalty, converted to a thirty-second time penalty, for being out of position on the formation lap. This demoted him from 22nd to 25th.

== Standings after the event ==
Drivers' Championship standings

	Pos.	Driver	Points
	1	(Brazil) Rafael Câmara	105
1	2	(Bulgaria) Nikola Tsolov	79
1	3	(Germany) Tim Tramnitz	70
	4	(Denmark) Noah Strømsted	56
	5	(Finland) Tuukka Taponen	51

Teams' Championship standings

	Pos.	Team	Points
	1	(Italy) Trident	176
	2	(Spain) Campos Racing	130
	3	(Netherlands) MP Motorsport	126
2	4	(Netherlands) Van Amersfoort Racing	106
1	5	(New Zealand) Rodin Motorsport	90

Note: Only the top five positions are included for both sets of standings.

== See also ==
- 2025 Spanish Grand Prix
- 2025 Barcelona Formula 2 round

Previous round: 2025 Monte Carlo Formula 3 round	FIA Formula 3 Championship; 2025 season	Next round: 2025 Spielberg Formula 3 round
Previous round: 2024 Barcelona Formula 3 round	Barcelona Formula 3 round	Next round: 2026 Barcelona Formula 3 round
