= Ernesto Rivera (racing driver) =

Mexican racing driver (born 2008)

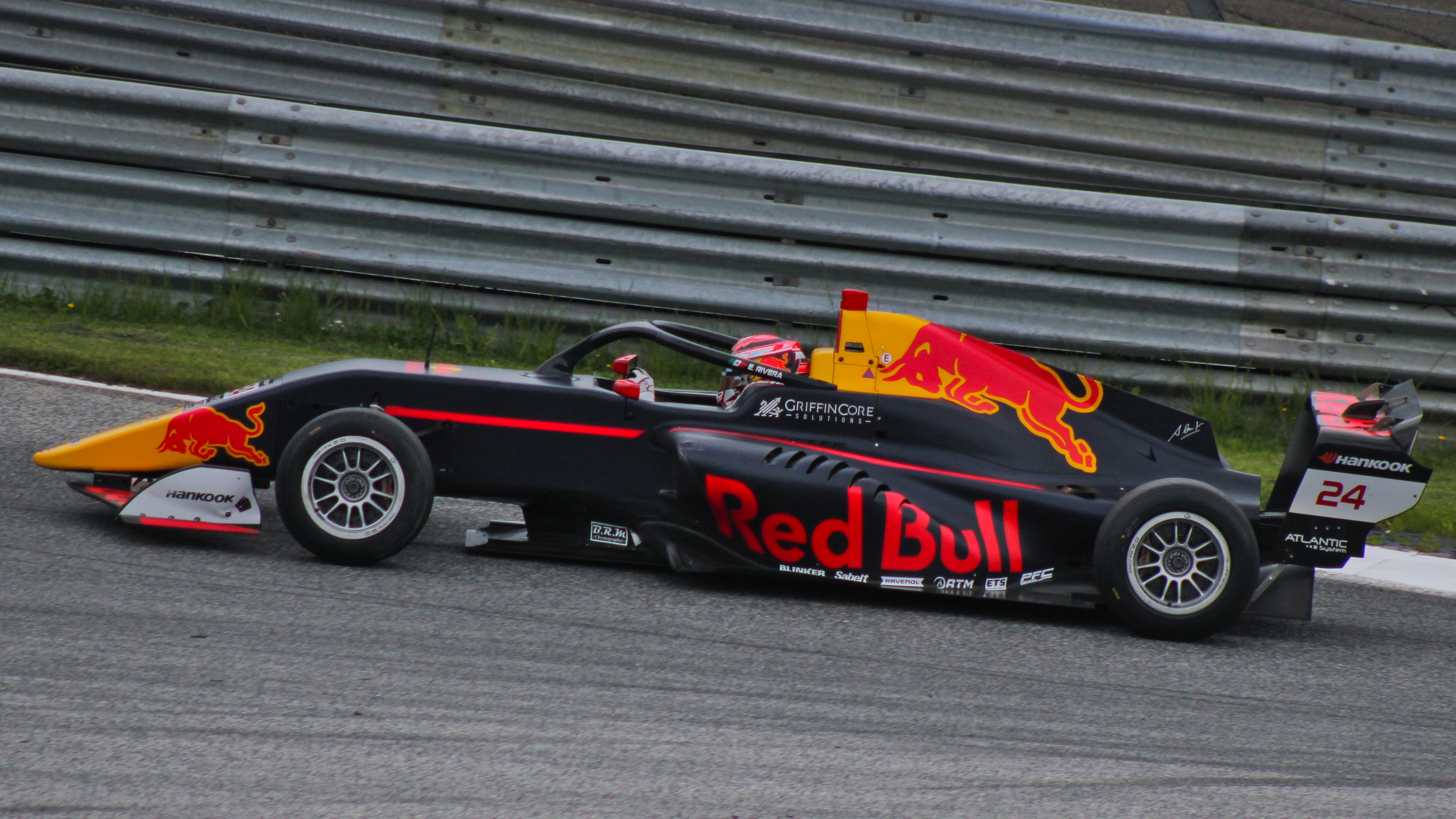
- Rivera driving at the Red Bull Ring during the 2025 Eurocup-3 season
- Nationality: Mexico
- Born: Ernesto Rivera Pavlovich; 1 December 2008 (age 17) Mexico City, Mexico

FIA Formula 3 career
- Debut season: 2026
- Current team: Campos Racing
- Car number: 3
- Starts: 17
- Wins: 2
- Podiums: 3
- Poles: 0
- Fastest laps: 1
- Best finish: 7th in 2026

Previous series
- 2026; 2025; 2025; 2025; 2024; 2024; 2024: FR Oceania; Eurocup-3; FR Middle East Championship; Eurocup-3 Spanish Winter; F4 British; F4 Spanish; Formula Winter Series
- Statistics up to date as of 19 October 2026.

Ernesto Rivera Pavlovich (born 1 December 2008) is a Mexican racing driver who is set to compete in FIA Formula 3 with Campos Racing as part of the Red Bull Junior Team.

He is a winner in Spanish F4, placing fifth in 2024. Rivera then graduated to Eurocup-3 in 2025, placing fourth.

== Career ==
=== Karting ===
Rivera has an impressive karting record. He was a regular at the front of the SKUSA SuperNationals between 2021 and 2023. In 2022, Rivera won the SuperNationals in the X30 Junior class, followed by a debut in the KA100 Junior category, which resulted in an appearance in the finale. 2023 resulted in further success, as he finished second in the Rotax US Trophy, as he joined the championship in the Senior category. at the SuperNationals, Rivera won both the X30 Junior and the KA100 Senior titles. He ended the year in Bahrain at the Rotax Max Challenge Grand Finals.

=== Formula 4 ===
In 2024, it was announced that Rivera would be stepping up to cars to join Campos Racing for the 2024 Formula Winter Series and the 2024 F4 Spanish Championship. In the Formula Winter Series, he showed signs of pace, and scored one podium over eleven races, as he finished 15th in the championship and fourth in the rookie standings. As he moved on to his main season in the F4 Spanish Championship, he impressed immediately as he secured a podium in the first round of the season at Jaramá. Rivera then proceeded to win his first race in the championship in Portimão. He had a consistent year compared to his rivals, scoring points in all but six races, as he finished a respectable fifth place in his rookie season of car-racing. He later announced that he would be competing in one round of the 2024 F4 British Championship at Zandvoort with Hitech Pulse-Eight.

=== Formula Regional ===
==== 2025 ====
In January 2025, Campos Racing announced that Rivera would step up to Eurocup-3 with them for 2025. He drove with the team as a guest driver in the final round of the Eurocup-3 Spanish Winter Championship, with a best finish of sixth in race one.

==== 2026 ====
In preparation for his Formula 3 campaign, Rivera competed in the pre-season Formula Regional Oceania Trophy with M2 Competition. At the end of the year, he joined Van Amersfoort Racing to compete in the Macau Grand Prix.

=== FIA Formula 3 ===
==== 2026 ====
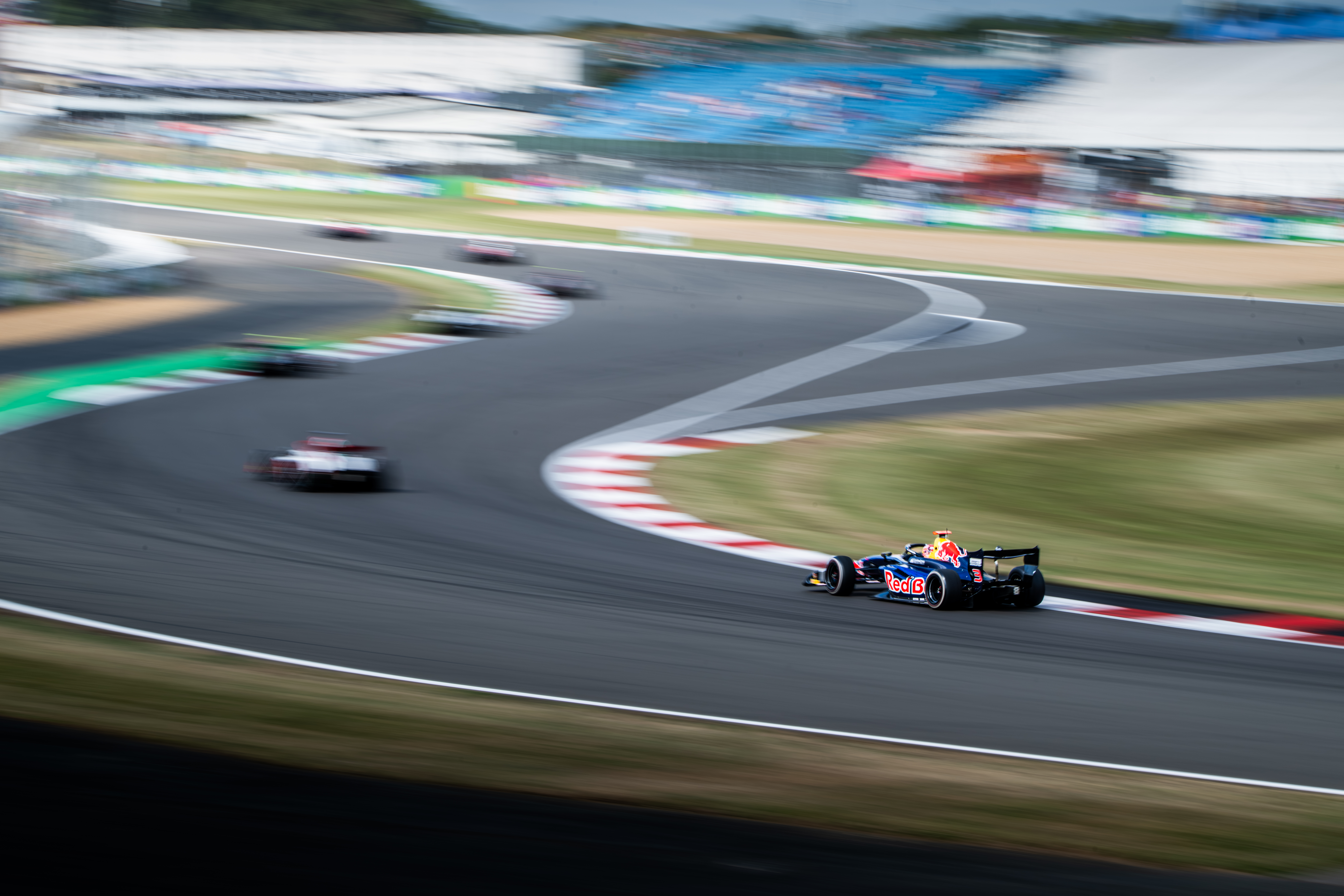
Rivera at the 2026 British Grand Prix

Rivera made the jump to Formula 3 in 2026, remaining with Campos Racing. He was replaced by Patrick Heuzenroeder for Barcelona pre-season testing after sustaining a back injury during the final round of the Formula Regional Oceania Trophy.

==== 2027 ====
Rivera will continue with Campos for a second Formula 3 season in 2027.

=== Formula One ===
In September 2024, it was confirmed that Rivera would be joining the Red Bull Junior Team after a successful trial at the Red Bull Driver Search. He would join the academy with three other young drivers.

== Karting record ==
=== Karting career summary ===
Season	Series	Team	Position
2021	SKUSA SuperNationals - X30 Junior	HRI Mexico	34th
2022	SKUSA SuperNationals - X30 Junior	Rolison Performance Group	1st
2022	SKUSA SuperNationals - KA100 Jr.	Rolison Performance Group	39th
2023	Rotax US Trophy - Senior Max		2nd
2023	SKUSA SuperNationals - X30 Junior	Rolison Performance Group	1st
2023	SKUSA SuperNationals - X30 Senior	Rolison Performance Group	25th
2023	SKUSA SuperNationals - KA100 Sr.		1st
2023	Rotax Max Challenge Grand Finals - Rotax Senior		NC

== Racing record ==
=== Racing career summary ===
Season	Series	Team	Races	Wins	Poles	F/Laps	Podiums	Points	Position
2024	Formula Winter Series	Campos Racing	11	0	0	0	1	24	15th
2024	F4 Spanish Championship	Griffin Core by Campos Racing	21	1	0	0	2	148	5th
2024	F4 British Championship	Hitech Pulse-Eight	3	0	0	0	0	18	22nd
2025	Formula Regional Middle East Championship	Pinnacle Motorsport	15	0	0	0	1	101	9th
2025	Eurocup-3 Spanish Winter Championship	Campos Racing	2	0	0	0	0	0	NC†
2025	Eurocup-3	Campos Racing	18	3	2	1	7	176	4th
2026	Formula Regional Oceania Trophy	M2 Competition	13	0	1	1	2	134	11th
2026	FIA Formula 3 Championship	Campos Racing	17	2	0	1	3	87	7th
2026	Macau Grand Prix	Van Amersfoort Racing	0	0	0	0	0	—N/a	TBD
2027	FIA Formula 3 Championship	Campos Racing	0	0	0	0	0	0	TBD

* Season in progress.
† As Rivera was a guest driver, he was ineligible to score points.

=== Complete Formula Winter Series results ===
(key) (Races in bold indicate pole position; races in italics indicate fastest lap)

Year	Team	1	2	3	4	5	6	7	8	9	10	11	12	DC	Points
2024	Campos Racing	JER; 1; 23	JER; 2; 34	JER; 3; 6	CRT; 1 DSQ	CRT; 2 Ret	CRT; 3; 14	ARA; 1 Ret	ARA; 2; 10	ARA; 3; 26	CAT; 1 C	CAT; 2; 3	CAT; 3; 19	15th	24

=== Complete F4 Spanish Championship results ===
(key) (Races in bold indicate pole position; races in italics indicate fastest lap)

Year	Team	1	2	3	4	5	6	7	8	9	10	11	12	13	14	15	16	17	18	19	20	21	DC	Points
2024	Griffin Core by Campos Racing	JAR; 1; 9	JAR; 2 Ret	JAR; 3; 2	POR; 1; 8	POR; 2; 1	POR; 3; 4	LEC; 1; 5	LEC; 2; 4	LEC; 3; 4	ARA; 1; 32†	ARA; 2; 25	ARA; 3; 6	CRT; 1; 7	CRT; 2; 5	CRT; 3; 20	JER; 1; 4	JER; 2; 6	JER; 3 Ret	CAT; 1; 4	CAT; 2; 4	CAT; 3; 11	5th	148

=== Complete F4 British Championship results ===
(key) (Races in bold indicate pole position) (Races in italics indicate fastest lap)

Year	Team	1	2	3	4	5	6	7	8	9	10	11	12	13	14	15	16	17	18	19	20	21	22	23	24	25	26	27	28	29	30	31	32	DC	Points
2024	Hitech Pulse-Eight	DPN; 1	DPN; 2	DPN; 3	BHI; 1	BHI; 2	BHI; 3	SNE; 1	SNE; 2	SNE; 3	THR; 1	THR; 2	THR; 3	SILGP; 1	SILGP; 2	SILGP; 3	ZAN; 1; 5	ZAN; 2; 26	ZAN; 3; 6	KNO; 1	KNO; 2	KNO; 3	DPGP; 1	DPGP; 2	DPGP; 3	DPGP; 4	SILN; 1	SILN; 2	SILN; 3	BHGP; 1	BHGP; 2	BHGP; 3	BHGP; 4	22nd	18

=== Complete Formula Regional Middle East Championship results ===
(key) (Races in bold indicate pole position) (Races in italics indicate fastest lap)

Year	Entrant	1	2	3	4	5	6	7	8	9	10	11	12	13	14	15	DC	Points
2025	Pinnacle Motorsport	YMC1; 1; 5	YMC1; 2; 13	YMC1; 3; 5	YMC2; 1; 17	YMC2; 2; 12	YMC2; 3; 5	DUB; 1; 25†	DUB; 2; 22	DUB; 3; 9	YMC3; 1; 8	YMC3; 2; 5	YMC3; 3; 7	LUS; 1; 9	LUS; 2; 2	LUS; 3; 7	9th	101

=== Complete Eurocup-3 Spanish Winter Championship results ===
(key) (Races in bold indicate pole position) (Races in italics indicate fastest lap)

Year	Team	1	2	3	4	5	6	7	8	DC	Points
2025	Campos Racing	JER; 1	JER; 2	JER; 3	POR; 1	POR; 2	POR; 3	ARA; 1; 5	ARA; 2; 5	NC†	0

† As Rivera was a guest driver, he was ineligible to score points.

=== Complete Eurocup-3 results ===
(key) (Races in bold indicate pole position) (Races in italics indicate fastest lap)

Year	Team	1	2	3	4	5	6	7	8	9	10	11	12	13	14	15	16	17	18	DC	Points
2025	Campos Racing	RBR; 1; 3	RBR; 2; 6	POR; 1; 2	POR; SR; 26	POR; 2; 1	**LEC**; **1**; 4	LEC; SR; 8	LEC; 2; 3	**MNZ**; **1**; 1	MNZ; 2; 5	ASS; 1; 13	ASS; 2; 17	SPA; 1; 11	SPA; 2; 1	JER; 1 Ret	JER; 2; 3	CAT; 1 Ret	CAT; 2; 14	4th	176

=== Complete Formula Regional Oceania Trophy results ===
(key) (Races in bold indicate pole position) (Races in italics indicate fastest lap)

Year	Team	1	2	3	4	5	6	7	8	9	10	11	12	13	14	15	16	DC	Points
2026	M2 Competition	HMP; 1; 9	HMP; 2 Ret	HMP; 3; 3	HMP; 4; 8	TAU; 1; 7	TAU; 2; 2	TAU; 3; 14	TAU; 4; 7	**TER**; **1** Ret	TER; 2; 10	TER; 3 C	TER; 4 Ret	HIG; 1; 14	HIG; 2; 18†	HIG; 3 WD	HIG; 4 WD	11th	134

=== Complete FIA Formula 3 Championship results ===
(key) (Races in bold indicate pole position) (Races in italics indicate fastest lap)

Year	Entrant	1	2	3	4	5	6	7	8	9	10	11	12	13	14	15	16	17	18	19	20	DC	Points
2026	Campos Racing	MEL; SPR	MEL; FEA	MON; SPR; Ret	MON; FEA; 5	CAT; SPR; Ret	CAT; FEA; 7	RBR; SPR; 1	RBR; FEA; 18	SIL; SPR; 14	SIL; FEA; 10	SPA; SPR; 8	SPA; FEA; 1	HUN; SPR; 3	HUN; FEA; 6	MNZ; SPR; 7	MNZ; FEA; Ret	MAD; SPR; 6	MAD; FEA1; 8	MAD; FEA2; 9		7th	87
2027	Campos Racing	BHR; SPR	BHR; FEA	JED; SPR	JED; FEA	MEL; SPR	MEL; FEA	MTL; SPR	MTL; FEA	MON; SPR	MON; FEA	SIL; SPR	SIL; FEA	RBR; SPR	RBR; FEA	MNZ; SPR	MNZ; FEA	MAD; SPR	MAD; FEA	IST; SPR	IST; FEA	TBD	TBD

=== Complete Macau Grand Prix results ===
Year	Team	Car	Qualifying	Quali Race	Main Race
2026	(Netherlands) Van Amersfoort Racing	Tatuus T-326	TBD	TBD	TBD
