= José Garfias =

Mexican racing driver (born 2004)

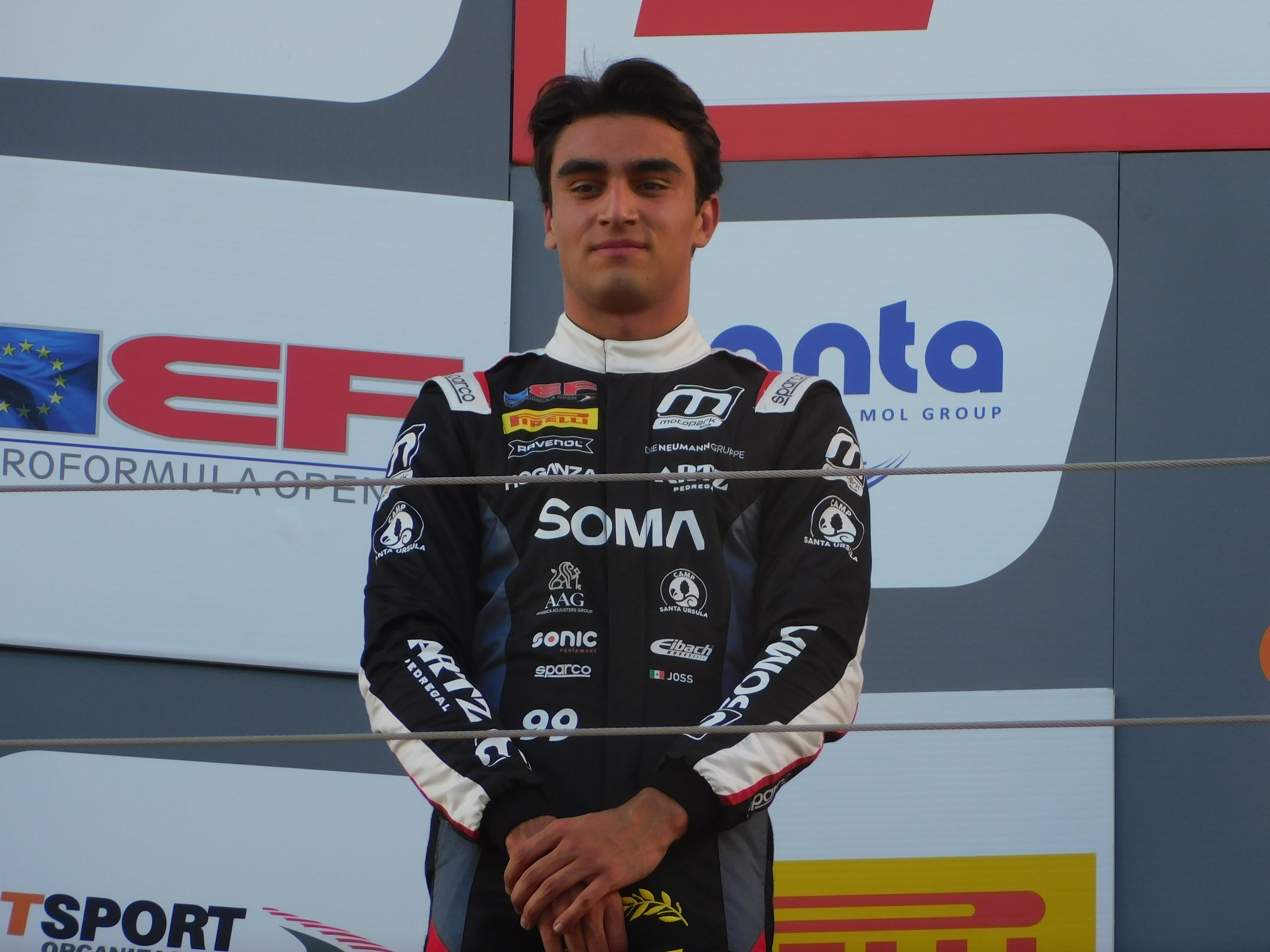
- Garfias on the podium at the Red Bull Ring in 2025
- Nationality: (Mexico) Mexican
- Born: José Antonio Garfias Martínez Lavín; October 26, 2004 (age 22) San Luis Potosí, Mexico

FIA Formula 3 Championship career
- Debut season: 2025
- Current team: Prema Racing
- Categorisation: FIA Silver
- Car number: 22
- Former teams: AIX Racing
- Starts: 21
- Wins: 0
- Podiums: 0
- Poles: 0
- Fastest laps: 0
- Best finish: 29th in 2026

Previous series
- 2024–2025; 2024; 2023–2024; 2021; 2021; 2018–20; 2019: Euroformula Open; FR Middle East; Eurocup-3; FR European; GB3; NACAM F4; Fórmula México
- Statistics up to date as of 14 September 2026.

José Antonio "Joss" Garfias Martínez Lavín (born 26 October 2004) is a Mexican racing driver who last competed in the FIA Formula 3 Championship for Prema Racing.

Garfias previously competed in Eurocup-3 and Euroformula Open, and debuted in the 2025 FIA Formula 3 Championship in Barcelona with AIX.

== Career ==
=== Formula 4 ===
==== 2018-19 ====
Garfias' single-seater debut came in 2019, when he joined the final round of the NACAM Formula 4 Championship with Telcel RPL Racing. He scored points in all three races, finishing 15th in the standings.

==== 2019-20 ====
Garfias remained with Telcel RPL Racing for the 2019–20 season. He took his maiden win in the reverse-grid race two at the Autódromo Miguel E. Abed. Another win came at the Autódromo Yucatán, and one further victory in Monterrey saw him finish fourth overall in the standings.

=== GB3 ===
For 2021, Garfias joined the GB3 Championship (known for most of the season as the BRDC British Formula 3 Championship) with Elite Motorsport. He took a best finish of fifth in race three at Silverstone, having taken the position from Frederick Lubin with his car partially on the grass. He withdrew from the series ahead of the second Silverstone round, finishing 17th in the standings.

=== Formula Regional ===
==== 2021 ====
Garfias made his Formula Regional debut later in 2021, joining Monolite Racing for three rounds of the 2021 Formula Regional European Championship. He failed to score points, taking a best result of 20th to finish 36th overall.

==== 2024 ====
In 2024, Garfias competed in the final three rounds of the pre-season Formula Regional Middle East Championship with Saintéloc Racing. He failed to score points during the appearance, finishing 27th in the standings.

=== Eurocup-3 ===
==== 2023 ====
After a year away from racing due to lack of sponsors, Garfias joined MP Motorsport for the inaugural Eurocup-3 season. He took his maiden podium in Aragón after Bruno del Pino received a track limits penalty. After a string of consistent performances where he did not finish below sixth, Garfias took four podiums in the final five races of the season, elevating him to fourth overall in the standings.

==== 2024 ====
Garfias returned to the series for 2024, switching teams to Saintéloc Racing for their first full campaign in the series. His season began with a sixth place in wet conditions at Spa. However, he struggled to maintain the consistency from his debut season; a fifth place in Portimão came after he made contact with teammate Alexander Abkhazava, and although he improved his best result to fourth at Paul Ricard, Garfias only scored four further points finishes. He left the series ahead of round seven and finished tenth in the standings with 52 points.

=== Euroformula Open ===
==== 2024 ====
Garfias competed in the final three rounds of the 2024 Euroformula Open Championship with Team Motopark. He quickly gained momentum in the series, taking two podiums out of three races in both Barcelona and Monza. He finished seventh in the standings with 99 points.

==== 2025 ====
In April 2025, Garfias was announced to be remaining with Team Motopark in Euroformula Open to contest the full season with them. He took his first podium of the season in race 3 at Spa-Francorchamps, despite a spin on the opening lap.

=== FIA Formula 3 Championship ===
==== 2025 ====
Garfias made a one-off appearance in FIA Formula 3 in Barcelona round with AIX Racing, replacing an injured James Hedley.

==== 2026 ====
Just days before the start of pre-season testing, Garfias was signed by Prema Racing to race in the 2026 season, replacing Enzo Deligny who suddenly departed for Van Amersfoort Racing.

== Karting record ==
=== Karting career summary ===
Season	Series	Team	Position
2017	SKUSA SuperNationals XXI - Mini Swift	RPL Racing	53rd
2018	SKUSA SuperNationals XXII - X30 Junior	RPL Racing	58th
2019	SKUSA SuperNationals XXIII - X30 Junior		29th

== Racing record ==
=== Racing career summary ===
Season	Series	Team	Races	Wins	Poles	F/Laps	Podiums	Points	Position
2018–19	NACAM Formula 4 Championship	Telcel RPL Racing	3	0	0	0	0	14	15th
2019	Fórmula México	RE Racing	5	0	0	0	4	333	**3rd**
2019–20	NACAM Formula 4 Championship	Telcel RPL Racing	20	3	0	2	7	238	4th
2021	GB3 Championship	Elite Motorsport	15	0	0	0	0	117	17th
2021	Formula Regional European Championship	Monolite Racing	6	0	0	0	0	0	36th
2023	Eurocup-3	MP Motorsport	16	0	0	0	5	160	4th
2024	Formula Regional Middle East Championship	Saintéloc Racing	9	0	0	0	0	0	27th
2024	Eurocup-3	Saintéloc Racing	12	0	0	1	0	52	10th
2024	Euroformula Open Championship	Team Motopark	9	0	1	1	4	99	7th
2025	Euroformula Open Championship	Team Motopark	24	3	0	3	10	276	4th
2025	FIA Formula 3 Championship	AIX Racing	2	0	0	0	0	0	37th
2025	Macau Grand Prix	PHM Racing	1	0	0	0	0	—N/a	10th
2026	FIA Formula 3 Championship	Prema Racing	19	0	0	0	0	1	29th

* Season still in progress.

=== Complete NACAM Formula 4 Championship results ===
(key) (Races in bold indicate pole position) (Races in italics indicate fastest lap)

Year	Team	1	2	3	4	5	6	7	8	9	10	11	12	13	14	15	16	17	18	19	20	Pos	Points
2018-19	Telcel RPL Racing	AHR1; 1	AHR1; 2	PUE; 1	PUE; 2	PUE; 3	SLP; 1	SLP; 2	SLP; 3	MTY; 1	MTY; 2	MTY; 3	AGS; 1	AGS; 2	AGS; 3	PUE; 1	PUE; 2	PUE; 3	AHR2; 1; 6	AHR2; 2; 9	AHR2; 3; 8	15th	14
2019-20	Telcel RPL Racing	AHR; 1; 10	AHR; 2 Ret	AGS; 1; 4	AGS; 2; 2	AGS; 3; 5	PUE; 1; 5	PUE; 2; 1	PUE; 3; 4	MER; 1; 3	MER; 2; 2	MER; 3; 1	QUE1; 1; 3	QUE1; 2 Ret	QUE1; 3; 5	QUE2; 1; 7	QUE2; 2; 4	QUE2; 3 Ret	MTY; 1; 4	MTY; 2; 1	MTY; 3; 4	4th	238

=== Complete GB3 Championship results ===
(key) (Races in bold indicate pole position) (Races in italics indicate fastest lap)

Year	Entrant	1	2	3	4	5	6	7	8	9	10	11	12	13	14	15	16	17	18	19	20	21	22	23	24	Pos	Points
2021	Elite Motorsport	BRH; 1 Ret	BRH; 2; 14	BRH; 3; 15	SIL1; 1; 11	SIL1; 2; 15	SIL1; 3; 5^{1}	DON1; 1; 11	DON1; 2; 12	DON1; 3; 10	SPA; 1; 13	SPA; 2 Ret	SPA; 3; 10^{3}	SNE; 1; 9	SNE; 2; 9	SNE; 3; 8^{6}	SIL2; 1 WD	SIL2; 2 WD	SIL2; 3 WD	OUL; 1	OUL; 2	OUL; 3	DON2; 1	DON2; 2	DON2; 3	17th	117

=== Complete Formula Regional European Championship results ===
(key) (Races in bold indicate pole position) (Races in italics indicate fastest lap)

Year	Team	1	2	3	4	5	6	7	8	9	10	11	12	13	14	15	16	17	18	19	20	Pos	Points
2021	Monolite Racing	IMO; 1	IMO; 2	CAT; 1	CAT; 2	MCO; 1	MCO; 2	LEC; 1	LEC; 2	ZAN; 1	ZAN; 2	SPA; 1	SPA; 2	RBR; 1; 28	RBR; 2; 20	VAL; 1; 24	VAL; 2 Ret	MUG; 1; 20	MUG; 2; 23	MNZ; 1	MNZ; 2	36th	0

=== Complete Eurocup-3 results ===
(key) (Races in bold indicate pole position) (Races in italics indicate fastest lap)

Year	Team	1	2	3	4	5	6	7	8	9	10	11	12	13	14	15	16	17	Pos	Points
2023	MP Motorsport	SPA; 1 Ret	SPA; 2; 6	ARA; 1; 4	ARA; 2; 3	MNZ; 1; 6	MNZ; 2; 4	ZAN; 1; 6	ZAN; 2; 6	JER; 1; 5	JER; 2; 6	EST; 1; 6	EST; 2; 3	CRT; 1; 2	CRT; 2; 3	CAT; 1; 18†	CAT; 2; 3		4th	160
2024	Saintéloc Racing	SPA; 1; 6	SPA; 2 C	RBR; 1; 7	RBR; 2; 23	POR; 1 Ret	POR; 2; 5	POR; 3; 20	LEC; 1; 4	LEC; 2; 7	ZAN; 1; 22	ZAN; 2; 6	ARA; 1; 10	ARA; 2; 13	JER; 1	JER; 2	CAT; 1	CAT; 2	10th	52

=== Complete Formula Regional Middle East Championship results ===
(key) (Races in bold indicate pole position) (Races in italics indicate fastest lap)

Year	Entrant	1	2	3	4	5	6	7	8	9	10	11	12	13	14	15	DC	Points
2024	Saintéloc Racing	YMC1; 1	YMC1; 2	YMC1; 3	YMC2; 1	YMC2; 2	YMC2; 3	DUB1; 1; 17	DUB1; 2 Ret	DUB1; 3; 14	YMC3; 1; 25†	YMC3; 2; 17	YMC3; 3; 14	DUB2; 1; 16	DUB2; 2; 17	DUB2; 3; 18	27th	0

=== Complete Euroformula Open Championship results ===
(key) (Races in bold indicate pole position) (Races in italics indicate fastest lap)

Year	Team	1	2	3	4	5	6	7	8	9	10	11	12	13	14	15	16	17	18	19	20	21	22	23	24	Pos	Points
2024	Team Motopark	PRT; 1	PRT; 2	PRT; 3	HOC; 1	HOC; 2	HOC; 3	SPA; 1	SPA; 2	SPA; 3	HUN; 1	HUN; 2	HUN; 3	LEC; 1	LEC; 2	LEC; 3	**RBR**; **1** Ret	RBR; 2; 6*	RBR; 3; 4	CAT; 1; 2	CAT; 2; 6	CAT; 3; 3	MNZ; 1; 3	MNZ; 2; 2	MNZ; 3 Ret	7th	99
2025	Team Motopark	PRT; 1; 6	PRT; 2; 7	PRT; 3; 4	SPA; 1; 10	SPA; 2; 8†	SPA; 3; 3	HOC; 1; 4	HOC; 2; 1	HOC; 3; 3	HUN; 1; 2	HUN; 2; 5	HUN; 3; 1	LEC; 1; 3	LEC; 2; 11	LEC; 3; 1	RBR; 1; 2	RBR; 2; 4	RBR; 3; 2	CAT; 1; 10	CAT; 2; 10	CAT; 3; 3	MNZ; 1; 7	MNZ; 2 Ret	MNZ; 3; 4	4th	276

=== Complete FIA Formula 3 Championship results ===
(key) (Races in bold indicate pole position) (Races in italics indicate fastest lap)

Year	Entrant	1	2	3	4	5	6	7	8	9	10	11	12	13	14	15	16	17	18	19	20	DC	Points
2025	AIX Racing	MEL; SPR	MEL; FEA	BHR; SPR	BHR; FEA	IMO; SPR	IMO; FEA	MON; SPR	MON; FEA	CAT; SPR; 24†	CAT; FEA; Ret	RBR; SPR	RBR; FEA	SIL; SPR	SIL; FEA	SPA; SPR	SPA; FEA	HUN; SPR	HUN; FEA	MNZ; SPR	MNZ; FEA	37th	0
2026	Prema Racing	MEL; SPR; 24	MEL; FEA; 25	MON; SPR; 10	MON; FEA; 15	CAT; SPR; 27	CAT; FEA; 21	RBR; SPR; 24	RBR; FEA; 23	SIL; SPR; 26	SIL; FEA; 21	SPA; SPR; 19	SPA; FEA; 22	HUN; SPR; 15	HUN; FEA; 11	MNZ; SPR; 17	MNZ; FEA; 11	MAD; SPR; 22	MAD; FEA1; Ret	MAD; FEA2; 26		29th	1

=== Complete Macau Grand Prix results ===
Year	Team	Car	Qualifying	Quali Race	Main race
2025	(Germany) PHM Racing	Tatuus F3 T-318	15th	12th	10th
