= 2025 Monza Formula 3 round =

Motor racing event

(Italy) 2025 Monza Formula 3 round
Round details
- Round 10 of 10 in the 2025 FIA Formula 3 Championship.
- Layout of Monza Circuit
- Location: Monza Circuit; Monza, Italy
- Course: Permanent racing facility 5.793 km (3.599 mi)

Sprint Race
- Date: 6 September 2025
- Laps: 18
Podium
First	(Poland) Roman Bilinski	Rodin Motorsport
Second	(Norway) Martinius Stenshorne	Hitech TGR
Third	(Netherlands) Laurens van Hoepen	ART Grand Prix
Fastest lap
Driver	(Brazil) Rafael Câmara	Trident
- Time: 1:39.169 (on lap 10)

Feature Race
- Date: 7 September 2025
- Laps: 22
Pole position
Driver	(United States) Brad Benavides	AIX Racing
Time	1:38.120	
Podium
First	(Thailand) Tasanapol Inthraphuvasak	Campos Racing
Second	(Bulgaria) Nikola Tsolov	Campos Racing
Third	(Mexico) Noel León	Prema Racing
Fastest lap
Driver	(France) Alessandro Giusti	MP Motorsport
- Time: 1:38.910 (on lap 17)

The 2025 Monza Formula 3 round was a motor racing event held between 5 September and 7 September at the Monza Circuit. It was the final race of the 2025 FIA Formula 3 Championship and was held in support of the 2025 Italian Grand Prix.

== Classification ==
=== Qualifying ===
==== Group A ====
Qualifying for Group A was held on 5 September, at 15:00 local time (UTC+2).

Pos.	No.	Driver	Entrant	Time/Gap	Grid SR	Grid FR
1	3	(United States) Ugo Ugochukwu	Prema Racing	1:38.613	11	2
2	11	(Thailand) Tasanapol Inthraphuvasak	Campos Racing	+0.013	9	4
3	25	(Poland) Roman Bilinski	Rodin Motorsport	+0.054	7	6
4	19	(France) Alessandro Giusti	MP Motorsport	+0.057	5	8
5	17	(Germany) Tim Tramnitz	MP Motorsport	+0.212	3	10
6	7	(Netherlands) Laurens van Hoepen	ART Grand Prix	+0.375	1	12
7	1	(Italy) Brando Badoer	Prema Racing	+0.415	14	14
8	15	(United States) Nikita Johnson	Hitech TGR	+0.619	16	16
9	31	(Singapore) Christian Ho	DAMS Lucas Oil	+0.742	18	18
10	23	(United Kingdom) Callum Voisin	Rodin Motorsport	+0.834	20	20
11	9	(Australia) James Wharton	ART Grand Prix	+0.860	22	22
12	21	(United Kingdom) James Hedley	Van Amersfoort Racing	+1.016	24	24
13	29	(Italy) Nicola Lacorte	DAMS Lucas Oil	+1.097	25	26
14	27	(Italy) Nicola Marinangeli	AIX Racing	+1.420	27	28
107% time: 1:45.515
—	5	(Brazil) Rafael Câmara	Trident	+16.064^{1}	30	30

Notes:

- ^1Rafael Câmara failed to set a lap time within 107% of the fastest driver. Câmara was permitted to start both races from the back of the grid.

==== Group B ====
Qualifying for Group B was held on 5 September, at 15:20 local time (UTC+2).

Pos.	No.	Driver	Entrant	Time/Gap	Grid SR	Grid FR
1	28	(United States) Brad Benavides	AIX Racing	1:38.120	12	1
2	2	(Mexico) Noel León	Prema Racing	+0.262	10	3
3	12	(Bulgaria) Nikola Tsolov	Campos Racing	+0.347	8	5
4	30	(Peru) Matías Zagazeta	DAMS Lucas Oil	+0.362	6	7
5	8	(Finland) Tuukka Taponen	ART Grand Prix	+0.382	4	9
6	14	(Norway) Martinius Stenshorne	Hitech TGR	+0.440	2	11
7	22	(Portugal) Ivan Domingues	Van Amersfoort Racing	+0.480	13	13
8	6	(Austria) Charlie Wurz	Trident	+0.484	15	15
9	10	(Spain) Mari Boya	Campos Racing	+0.518	17	17
10	4	(Denmark) Noah Strømsted	Trident	+0.527	19	19
11	20	(France) Théophile Naël	Van Amersfoort Racing	+0.579	21	21
12	24	(New Zealand) Louis Sharp	Rodin Motorsport	+0.894	23	23
13	16	(China) Gerrard Xie	Hitech TGR	+0.964	29^{1}	25
14	18	(Spain) Bruno del Pino	MP Motorsport	+1.039	26	27
15	26	(Brazil) Fernando Barrichello	AIX Racing	+1.199	28	29

Notes:

- ^1Following the Budapest feature race, Gerrard Xie was handed a 10-second time penalty for causing a collision with Ugo Ugochukwu. Because Xie did not classify in that race, his time penalty was converted into a five-place grid penalty for the Monza sprint race.

=== Sprint race ===
The sprint race was held on 6 September 2025, at 09:15 local time (UTC+2).

Pos.	No.	Driver	Entrant	Laps	Time/Retired	Grid	Points
1	25	(Poland) Roman Bilinski	Rodin Motorsport	18	35:02.802	7	10
2	14	(Norway) Martinius Stenshorne	Hitech TGR	18	+0.353	2	9
3	7	(Netherlands) Laurens van Hoepen	ART Grand Prix	18	+1.012	1	8
4	30	(Peru) Matías Zagazeta	DAMS Lucas Oil	18	+2.723	6	7
5	10	(Spain) Mari Boya	Campos Racing	18	+3.304	17	6
6	19	(France) Alessandro Giusti	MP Motorsport	18	+3.830	5	5
7	23	(United Kingdom) Callum Voisin	Rodin Motorsport	18	+4.409	20	4
8	4	(Denmark) Noah Strømsted	Trident	18	+4.710	19	3
9	3	(United States) Ugo Ugochukwu	Prema Racing	18	+4.862	11	2
10	20	(France) Théophile Naël	Van Amersfoort Racing	18	+5.579	21	1+1
11	8	(Finland) Tuukka Taponen	ART Grand Prix	18	+6.094	4	
12	11	(Thailand) Tasanapol Inthraphuvasak	Campos Racing	18	+7.188	9	
13	15	(United States) Nikita Johnson	Hitech TGR	18	+7.619	16	
14	18	(Spain) Bruno del Pino	MP Motorsport	18	+7.640	26	
15	16	(China) Gerrard Xie	Hitech TGR	18	+7.806	29	
16	9	(Australia) James Wharton	ART Grand Prix	18	+8.352	22	
17	26	(Brazil) Fernando Barrichello	AIX Racing	18	+8.902	28	
18	17	(Germany) Tim Tramnitz	MP Motorsport	18	+8.908^{1}	3	
19	2	(Mexico) Noel León	Prema Racing	18	+9.009^{2}	10	
20	27	(Italy) Nicola Marinangeli	AIX Racing	18	+9.013	27	
21	24	(New Zealand) Louis Sharp	Rodin Motorsport	18	+9.212	23	
22	12	(Bulgaria) Nikola Tsolov	Campos Racing	18	+9.303	8	
23	31	(Singapore) Christian Ho	DAMS Lucas Oil	18	+9.673	18	
24	21	(United Kingdom) James Hedley	Van Amersfoort Racing	18	+11.345	24	
25	5	(Brazil) Rafael Câmara	Trident	18	+15.463^{3}	30	
26	28	(United States) Brad Benavides	AIX Racing	18	+16.503^{4}	12	
27	1	(Italy) Brando Badoer	Prema Racing	18	+21.639	14	
28	29	(Italy) Nicola Lacorte	DAMS Lucas Oil	18	+26.250^{5}	25	
DNF	6	(Austria) Charlie Wurz	Trident	14	Collision	15	
DNF	22	(Portugal) Ivan Domingues	Van Amersfoort Racing	0	Accident	13	
Fastest lap: (Brazil) Rafael Câmara (1:39.169 on lap 10)^{6}

Notes:

- ^1Tim Tramnitz received a ten-second time penalty for failing to engage the start set-up procedure before the race began. This demoted him from 1st to 18th.
- ^2Noel León was given a five-second time penalty for causing a collision with Brando Badoer and Charlie Wurz. This demoted him from 8th to 19th.
- ^3Rafael Câmara received a ten-second time penalty for leaving the track and gaining an advantage. This demoted him from 12th to 25th.
- ^4Brad Benavides was handed a ten-second time penalty for causing a collision with Tasanapol Inthraphuvasak.
- ^5Nicola Lacorte was given a ten-second time penalty for forcing Fernando Barrichello off the track.
- ^6Rafael Câmara set the fastest lap of the race, but did not finish within the top ten, so was ineligible to score the bonus point. Théophile Naël set the fastest lap within the top ten and therefore received the bonus point.

=== Feature race ===
The feature race was held on 7 September 2025, at 08:15 local time (UTC+2).

Pos.	No.	Driver	Entrant	Laps	Time/Retired	Grid	Points
1	11	(Thailand) Tasanapol Inthraphuvasak	Campos Racing	22	44:11.907	4	25
2	12	(Bulgaria) Nikola Tsolov	Campos Racing	22	+0.732	5	18
3	2	(Mexico) Noel León	Prema Racing	22	+2.152	3	15
4	28	(United States) Brad Benavides	AIX Racing	22	+3.844	1	12
5	5	(Brazil) Rafael Câmara	Trident	22	+5.107	30	10
6	4	(Denmark) Noah Strømsted	Trident	22	+5.425	19	8
7	25	(Poland) Roman Bilinski	Rodin Motorsport	22	+5.802	6	6
8	19	(France) Alessandro Giusti	MP Motorsport	22	+6.325	8	4+1
9	10	(Spain) Mari Boya	Campos Racing	22	+6.718	17	2
10	17	(Germany) Tim Tramnitz	MP Motorsport	22	+10.820	10	1
11	18	(Spain) Bruno del Pino	MP Motorsport	22	+11.379	27	
12	23	(United Kingdom) Callum Voisin	Rodin Motorsport	22	+13.104	20	
13	31	(Singapore) Christian Ho	DAMS Lucas Oil	22	+13.153	18	
14	1	(Italy) Brando Badoer	Prema Racing	22	+13.754	14	
15	8	(Finland) Tuukka Taponen	ART Grand Prix	22	+14.975	9	
16	9	(Australia) James Wharton	ART Grand Prix	22	+15.077	22	
17	21	(United Kingdom) James Hedley	Van Amersfoort Racing	22	+15.462	24	
18	20	(France) Théophile Naël	Van Amersfoort Racing	22	+15.645	21	
19	27	(Italy) Nicola Marinangeli	AIX Racing	22	+16.535	28	
20	15	(United States) Nikita Johnson	Hitech TGR	22	+41.867	16	
21	14	(Norway) Martinius Stenshorne	Hitech TGR	22	+52.175	11	
22	29	(Italy) Nicola Lacorte	DAMS Lucas Oil	22	+1:08.355	26	
23	7	(Netherlands) Laurens van Hoepen	ART Grand Prix	21	+1 lap	12	
DNF	22	(Portugal) Ivan Domingues	Van Amersfoort Racing	14		13	
DNF	30	(Peru) Matías Zagazeta	DAMS Lucas Oil	12	Collision damage	7	
DNF	24	(New Zealand) Louis Sharp	Rodin Motorsport	12	Engine issue	23	
DNF	3	(United States) Ugo Ugochukwu	Prema Racing	6	Accident	2	
DNF	26	(Brazil) Fernando Barrichello	AIX Racing	2	Accident	29	
DNF	16	(China) Gerrard Xie	Hitech TGR	1	Collision	25	
DNF	6	(Austria) Charlie Wurz	Trident	0	Damage	15	
Fastest lap: (France) Alessandro Giusti (1:38.910 on lap 17)

== Standings after the event ==
Drivers' Championship standings

	Pos.	Driver	Points
	1	(Brazil) Rafael Câmara	166
1	2	(Bulgaria) Nikola Tsolov	124
1	3	(Spain) Mari Boya	116
	4	(Germany) Tim Tramnitz	94
	5	(Norway) Martinius Stenshorne	89

Teams' Championship standings

	Pos.	Team	Points
1	1	(Spain) Campos Racing	314
1	2	(Italy) Trident	303
	3	(Netherlands) MP Motorsport	177
	4	(France) ART Grand Prix	152
	5	(Netherlands) Van Amersfoort Racing	138

Note: Only the top five positions are included for both sets of standings.

== See also ==
- 2025 Italian Grand Prix
- 2025 Monza Formula 2 round

Previous round: 2025 Budapest Formula 3 round	FIA Formula 3 Championship; 2025 season	Next round: 2026 Melbourne Formula 3 round
Previous round: 2024 Monza Formula 3 round	Monza Formula 3 round	Next round: 2026 Monza Formula 3 round
