= Bruno del Pino =

Spanish racing driver (born 2006)

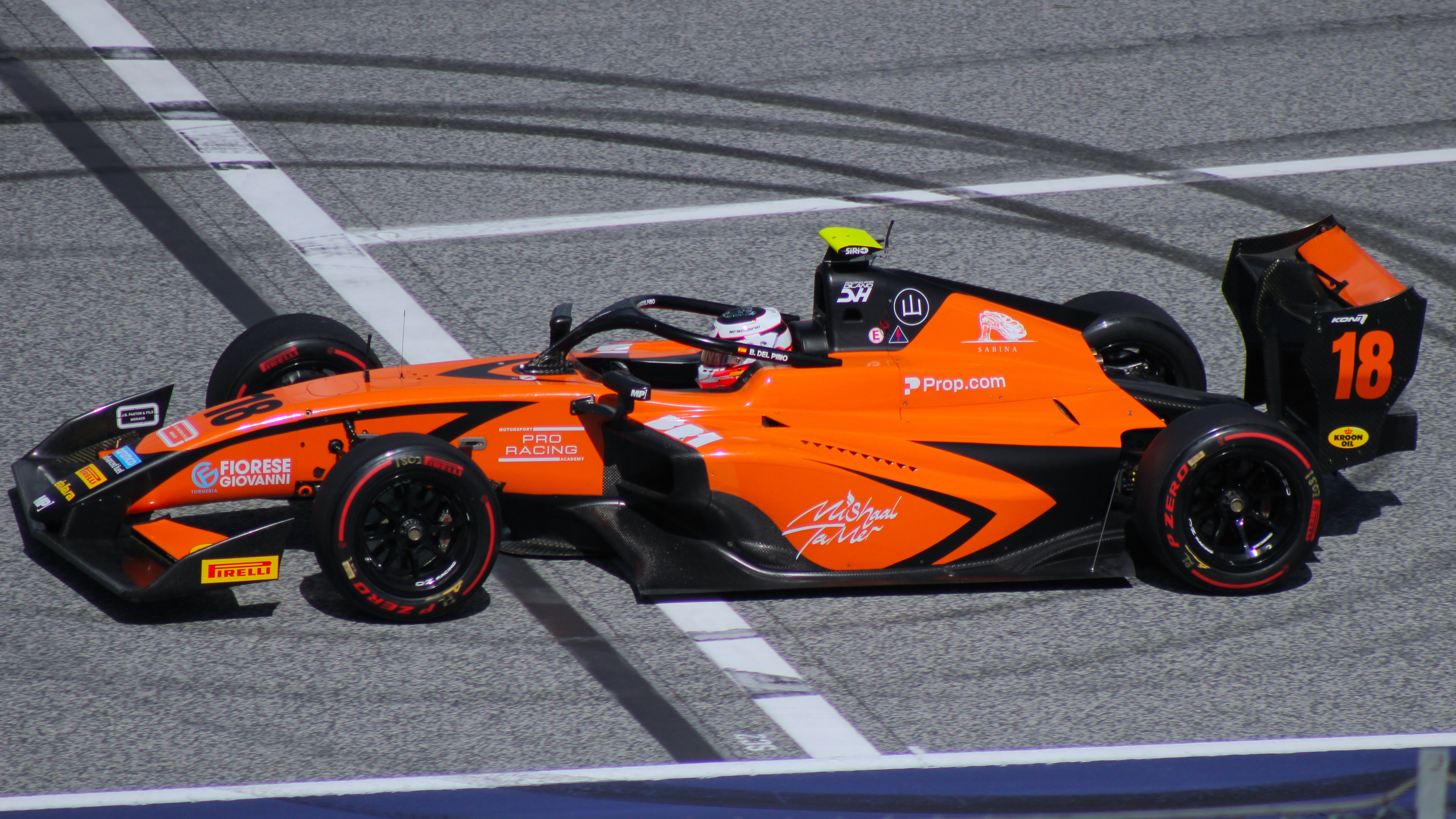
- Del Pino driving the Dallara F3 2025 during the 2025 Spielberg Formula 3 round
- Nationality: (Spain) Spanish
- Born: Bruno del Pino Ventos; 20 June 2006 (age 20) Barcelona, Catalonia, Spain
- Relatives: Pedro de la Rosa (uncle)

FIA Formula 3 Championship career
- Debut season: 2025
- Current team: Van Amersfoort Racing
- Car number: 16
- Former teams: MP Motorsport
- Starts: 38
- Wins: 1
- Podiums: 3
- Poles: 0
- Fastest laps: 2
- Best finish: 11th in 2026

Previous series
- 2024; 2023–2024; 2023; 2022: FR Middle East; Eurocup-3; FR European; F4 Spanish
Medal record
Formula 4
Representing Spain
FIA Motorsport Games
Bronze medal – third place	2022 Le Castellet	F4 Cup
- Statistics up to date as of 15 September 2026.

Bruno del Pino Ventos (born 20 June 2006) is a Spanish racing driver who last competed in the FIA Formula 3 Championship for Van Amersfoort Racing.

Del Pino previously competed in the 2024 Eurocup-3 season for MP Motorsport, where he finished third. He is the nephew of former Formula One driver, Pedro de la Rosa.

== Career ==
=== Karting ===
Del Pino began in competitive karting career in 2017. He entered various high-profile karting events such as the CIK-FIA World and European Championships. He had a best finish of fifth in the 2018 IAME Winter Cup in the X30 Mini category and ninth in the 2020 CIK-FIA European Championship. Del Pino also finished in ninth in the 2021 WSK Open Cup in the OK category.

=== Formula 4 ===
Del Pino made his Formula 4 debut in the 2022 F4 Spanish Championship with his uncle's team, Drivex School, partnering Maksim Arkhangelskiy and Gaël Julien. He finished the season in 16th with 24 points.

Del Pino also represented Team Spain at the 2022 FIA Motorsport Games for the Formula 4 Cup, he qualified in 11th, came fifth in the qualifying race, and then came third in the main race.

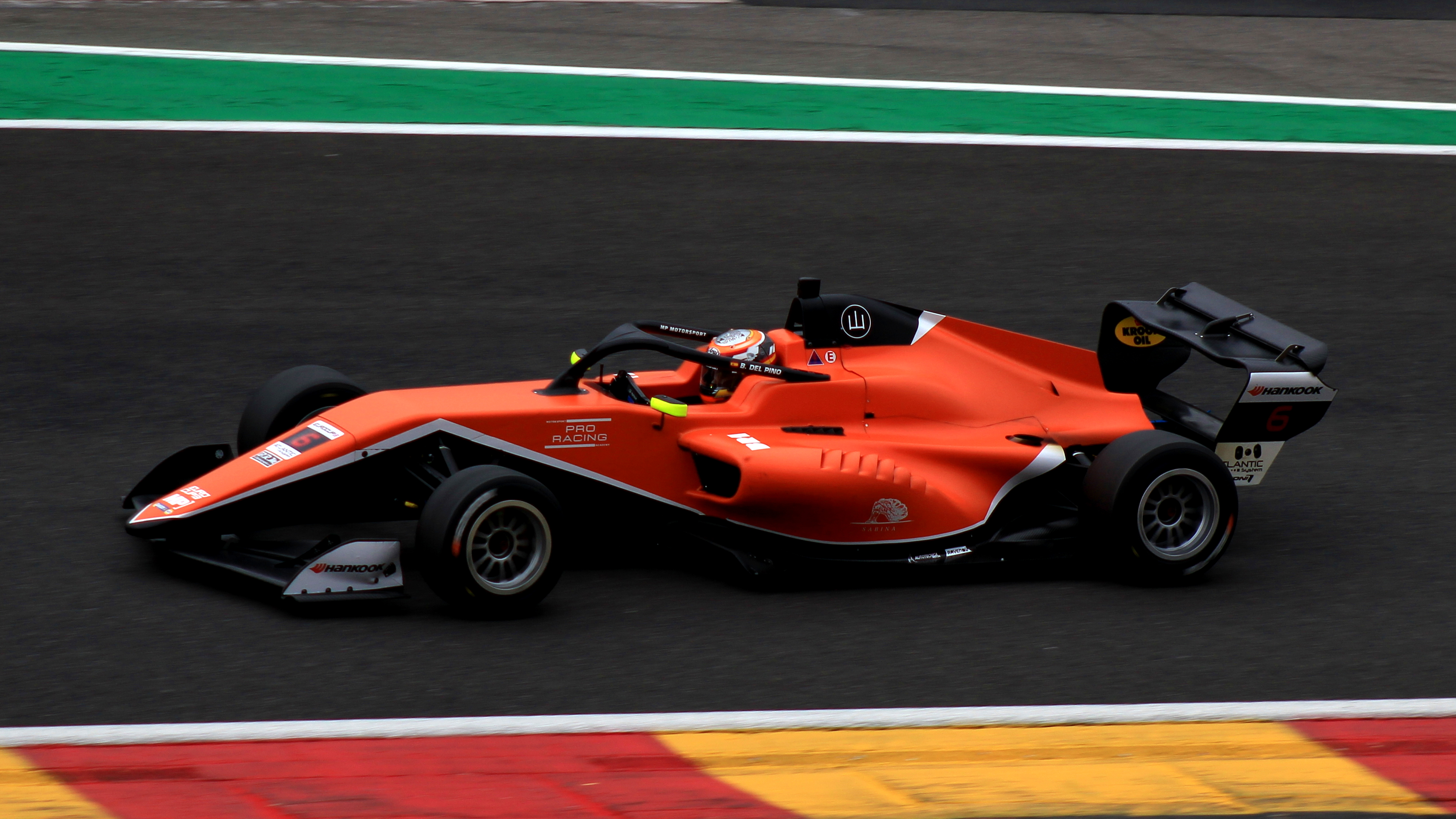
Del Pino racing at Spa-Francorchamps during the 2023 Eurocup-3 season

=== Eurocup-3 ===
==== 2023 ====
Del Pino made the step up to the newly formed 2023 Eurocup-3 with MP Motorsport, partnering Mari Boya, Sebastian Øgaard, Sebastian Gravlund and José Garfias. Despite getting no podiums, poles or wins, he had a very consistent season, scoring points in every race of the season, bar the exception of two races, where he retired from one of them. This performance gave him the rookies' title.

==== 2024 ====
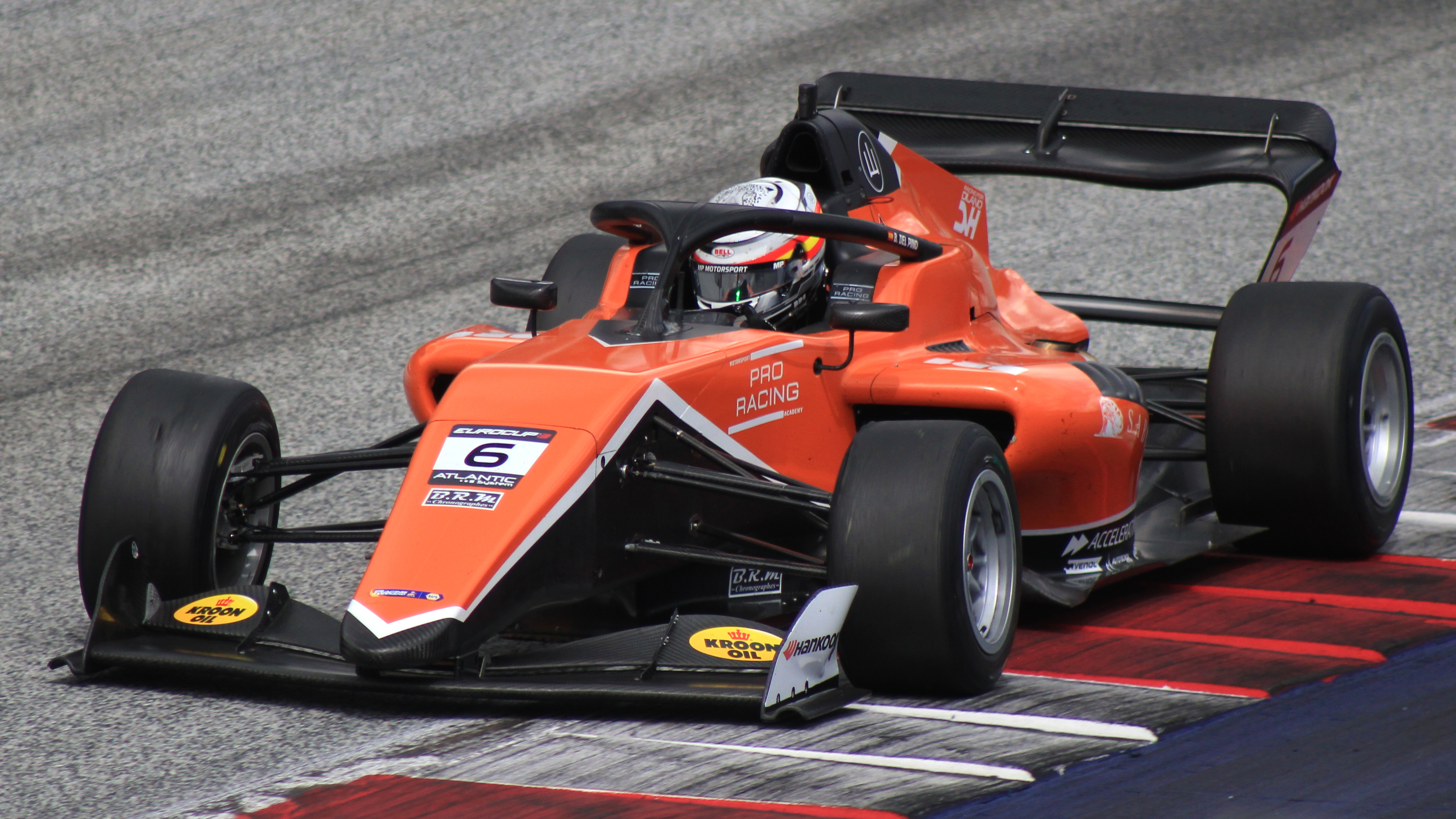
Del Pino driving at the Red Bull Ring during the 2024 Eurocup-3 season

For 2024, Del Pino remained in the 2024 Eurocup-3 season in which he finished with three victories, eight podiums, one pole position and three fastest laps and finished third in the overall standings with the same team.

=== Formula Regional ===
==== 2023 ====
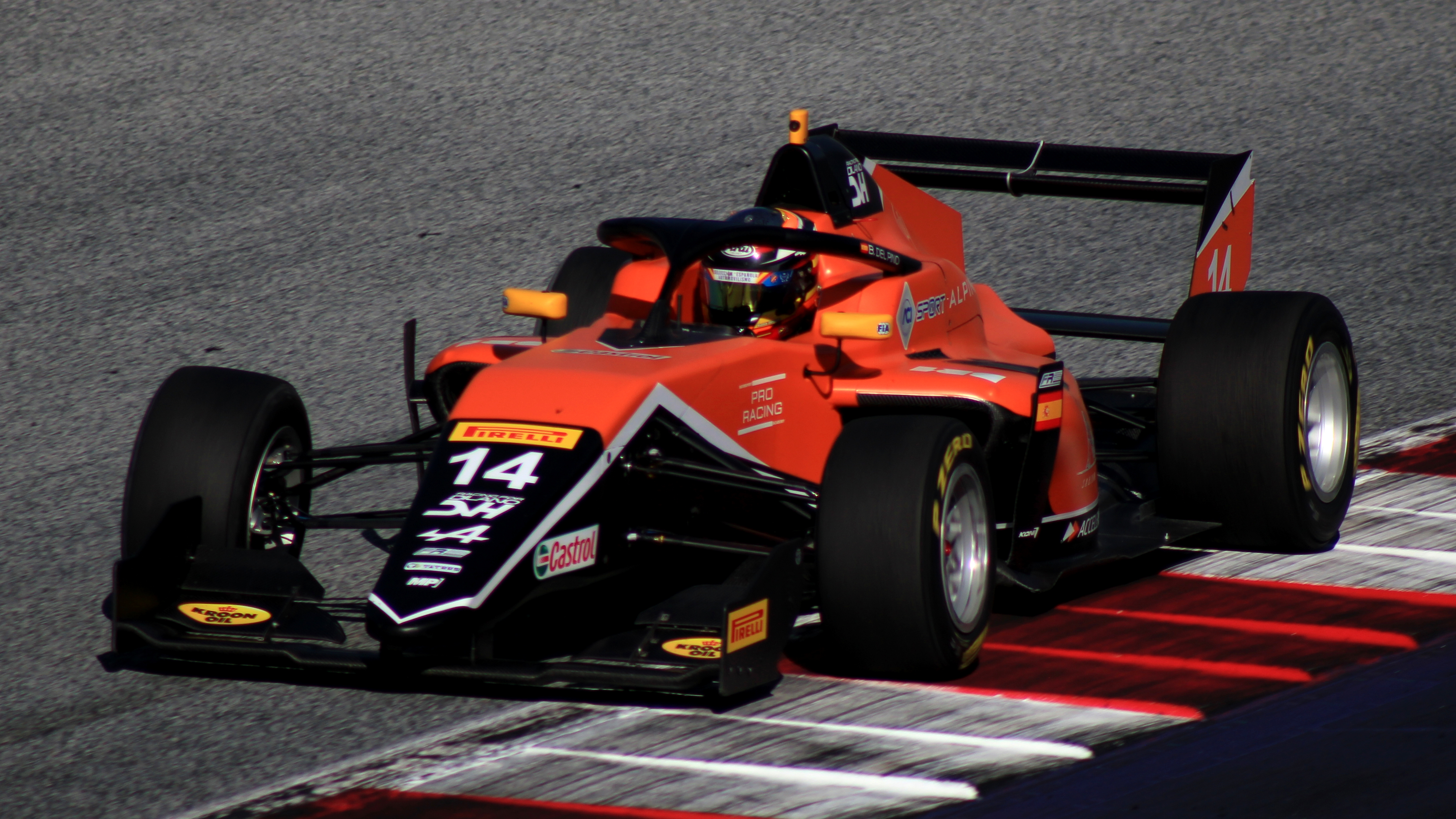
Del Pino driving at the Red Bull Ring during the 2023 Formula Regional European Championship

Del Pino made his debut in the Formula Regional European Championship driving for MP Motorsport in the seventh round in the Red Bull Ring. He came in 21st and 16th, and finished in 32nd in the championship standings.

==== 2024 ====
Del Pino also joined MP Motorsport to compete in the 2024 Formula Regional Middle East Championship, and finished in the championship 16th in the drivers standings with 18 points.

=== FIA Formula 3 Championship ===
==== 2025 ====
Del Pino made the step up to FIA Formula 3 in 2025, continuing his relationship with MP Motorsport. He finished on the podium in the Imola sprint race behind teammate Tim Tramnitz, having started from reverse-grid pole; it was MP's first one-two finish in the series.

After three years of racing for the team, Del Pino departed MP Motorsport at the end of the season.

==== 2026 ====
Del Pino remained in Formula 3 for 2026, moving to Van Amersfoort Racing for his second season alongside Enzo Deligny and Hiyu Yamakoshi. He won the first race of the season at the Melbourne sprint race, taking his first Formula 3 win. Del Pino claimed his second and final podium of the season in the next sprint race at Monaco, these were the best performances of his campaign and he finished eleventh overall in the championship.

== Personal life ==
Del Pino is the nephew of former Formula One driver and Drivex School co-founder Pedro de la Rosa. He has two siblings.

== Karting record ==
=== Karting career summary ===
Season	Series	Team	Position
2017	Spanish District Championship Asturias - Alevin		13th
2017	Spanish District Championship Catalonia Alevin	RC2 Junior Team	16th
2017	Spanish Karting Championship - Alevin		11th
2018	Spanish Karting Championship - Cadet		7th
2018	IAME Winter Cup - X30 Mini	Unomatricula K-Team	5th
2019	German Karting Championship - OK Junior	CV Performance Group	
2019	CIK-FIA European Championship - OKJ	KR Motorsport	
2019	CIK-FIA World Championship - OKJ	KR Motorsport	
2019	WSK Super Master Series - OKJ	KR Motorsport	
2019	IAME Winter Cup - X30 Junior	Kart Republic Spain	
2020	WSK Open Cup - OK	Tony Kart Racing Team	14th
2020	25° South Garda Winter Cup - OKJ	Tony Kart Racing Team	11th
2020	CIK-FIA European Championship - OK Junior	Tony Kart Racing Team	9th
2020	WSK Super Master Series - OK Junior	LLK	55th
2020	WSK Champions Cup - OK Junior	LLK	18th
2020	IAME Winter Cup - X30 Junior	Tdkart Racing - Marlonkart	23rd
2021	CIK-FIA European Championship - OK	Tony Kart Racing Team	29th
2021	Champions of the Future - OK	Tony Kart Racing Team	53rd
2021	WSK Open Cup - OK	Tony Kart Racing Team	9th
2021	WSK Euro Series - OK	Tony Kart Racing Team	29th
2021	WSK Super Master Series - OK	Tony Kart Racing Team	44th

== Racing record ==
=== Racing career summary ===
Season	Series	Team	Races	Wins	Poles	F/Laps	Podiums	Points	Position
2022	F4 Spanish Championship	Drivex School	21	0	0	0	0	24	16th
2022	FIA Motorsport Games Formula 4 Cup	Team Spain	1	0	0	0	1	N/A	**3rd**
2023	Eurocup-3	MP Motorsport	16	0	0	0	0	113	7th
2023	Formula Regional European Championship	MP Motorsport	2	0	0	0	0	0	32nd
2024	Formula Regional Middle East Championship	MP Motorsport	15	0	0	0	0	18	16th
2024	Eurocup-3	MP Motorsport	16	3	1	3	8	209	**3rd**
2025	FIA Formula 3 Championship	MP Motorsport	19	0	0	0	1	16	23rd
2026	FIA Formula 3 Championship	Van Amersfoort Racing	19	1	0	2	2	57	11th

* Season still in progress.

=== Complete F4 Spanish Championship results ===
(key) (Races in bold indicate pole position) (Races in italics indicate fastest lap)

Year	Team	1	2	3	4	5	6	7	8	9	10	11	12	13	14	15	16	17	18	19	20	21	DC	Points
2022	Drivex	ALG; 1; 15	ALG; 2; 9	ALG; 3; 28†	JER; 1; 16	JER; 2; 12	JER; 3; 9	CRT; 1; 12	CRT; 2; 12	CRT; 3; 6	SPA; 1; 11	SPA; 2; 10	SPA; 3; 7	ARA; 1 Ret	ARA; 2; 13	ARA; 3; 12	NAV; 1; 15	NAV; 2; 12	NAV; 3; 6	CAT; 1 Ret	CAT; 2; 17	CAT; 3; 18	16th	24

=== Complete FIA Motorsport Games results ===
Year	Team	Cup	Qualifying	Quali Race	Main race
2022	Team Spain	**Formula 4**	11th	5th	**3rd**

=== Complete Eurocup-3 results ===
(key) (Races in bold indicate pole position) (Races in italics indicate fastest lap)

Year	Team	1	2	3	4	5	6	7	8	9	10	11	12	13	14	15	16	17	DC	Points
2023	MP Motorsport	SPA; 1; 8	SPA; 2 Ret	ARA; 1; 5	ARA; 2; 7	MNZ; 1; 14	MNZ; 2; 6	ZAN; 1; 4	ZAN; 2; 5	JER; 1; 10	JER; 2; 5	EST; 1; 8	EST; 2; 5	CRT; 1; 6	CRT; 2; 4	BAR; 1; 6	BAR; 2; 7		7th	113
2024	MP Motorsport	SPA; 1; 18	SPA; 2 C	RBR; 1; 2	RBR; 2; 1	POR; 1; 2	POR; 2; 7	POR; 3; 4	LEC; 1; 1	LEC; 2; 10	ZAN; 1; 3	ZAN; 2; 2	ARA; 1; 4	ARA; 2; 4	JER; 1; 12	**JER**; **2**; 1	CAT; 1; 3	CAT; 2; 11	3rd	209

=== Complete Formula Regional European Championship results ===
(key) (Races in bold indicate pole position) (Races in italics indicate fastest lap)

Year	Team	1	2	3	4	5	6	7	8	9	10	11	12	13	14	15	16	17	18	19	20	DC	Points
2023	MP Motorsport	IMO; 1	IMO; 2	CAT; 1	CAT; 2	HUN; 1	HUN; 2	SPA; 1	SPA; 2	MUG; 1	MUG; 2	LEC; 1	LEC; 2	RBR; 1; 21	RBR; 2; 16	MNZ; 1	MNZ; 2	ZAN; 1	ZAN; 2	HOC; 1	HOC; 2	32nd	0

=== Complete Formula Regional Middle East Championship results ===
(key) (Races in bold indicate pole position) (Races in italics indicate fastest lap)

Year	Entrant	1	2	3	4	5	6	7	8	9	10	11	12	13	14	15	DC	Points
2024	MP Motorsport	YMC1; 1; 17	YMC1; 2; 9	YMC1; 3; 12	YMC2; 1; 17	YMC2; 2; 12	YMC2; 3; 19	DUB1; 1; 13	DUB1; 2; 13	DUB1; 3; 6	YMC3; 1; 10	YMC3; 2 Ret	YMC3; 3; 10	DUB2; 1; 26	DUB2; 2; 13	DUB2; 3; 7	16th	18

=== Complete FIA Formula 3 Championship results ===
(key) (Races in bold indicate pole position) (Races in italics indicate fastest lap)

Year	Entrant	1	2	3	4	5	6	7	8	9	10	11	12	13	14	15	16	17	18	19	20	DC	Points
2025	MP Motorsport	MEL; SPR; Ret	MEL; FEA; 23	BHR; SPR; 19	BHR; FEA; 9	IMO; SPR; 2	IMO; FEA; 27	MON; SPR; 22	MON; FEA; NC	CAT; SPR; 12	CAT; FEA; 17	RBR; SPR; 22	RBR; FEA; 19	SIL; SPR; 20	SIL; FEA; 9	SPA; SPR; 8	SPA; FEA; C	HUN; SPR; 25	HUN; FEA; 25	MNZ; SPR; 14	MNZ; FEA; 11	23rd	16
2026	Van Amersfoort Racing	MEL; SPR; 1	MEL; FEA; 4	MON; SPR; 2	MON; FEA; 6	CAT; SPR; 6	CAT; FEA; 6	RBR; SPR; 10	RBR; FEA; 17	SIL; SPR; 21	SIL; FEA; 18	SPA; SPR; 15	SPA; FEA; 11	HUN; SPR; 18	HUN; FEA; 14	MNZ; SPR; 10	MNZ; FEA; 12	MAD; SPR; 4	MAD; FEA1; Ret	MAD; FEA2; 17		11th	57
