= 2026 FIA Formula 3 Championship =

Motor racing championship

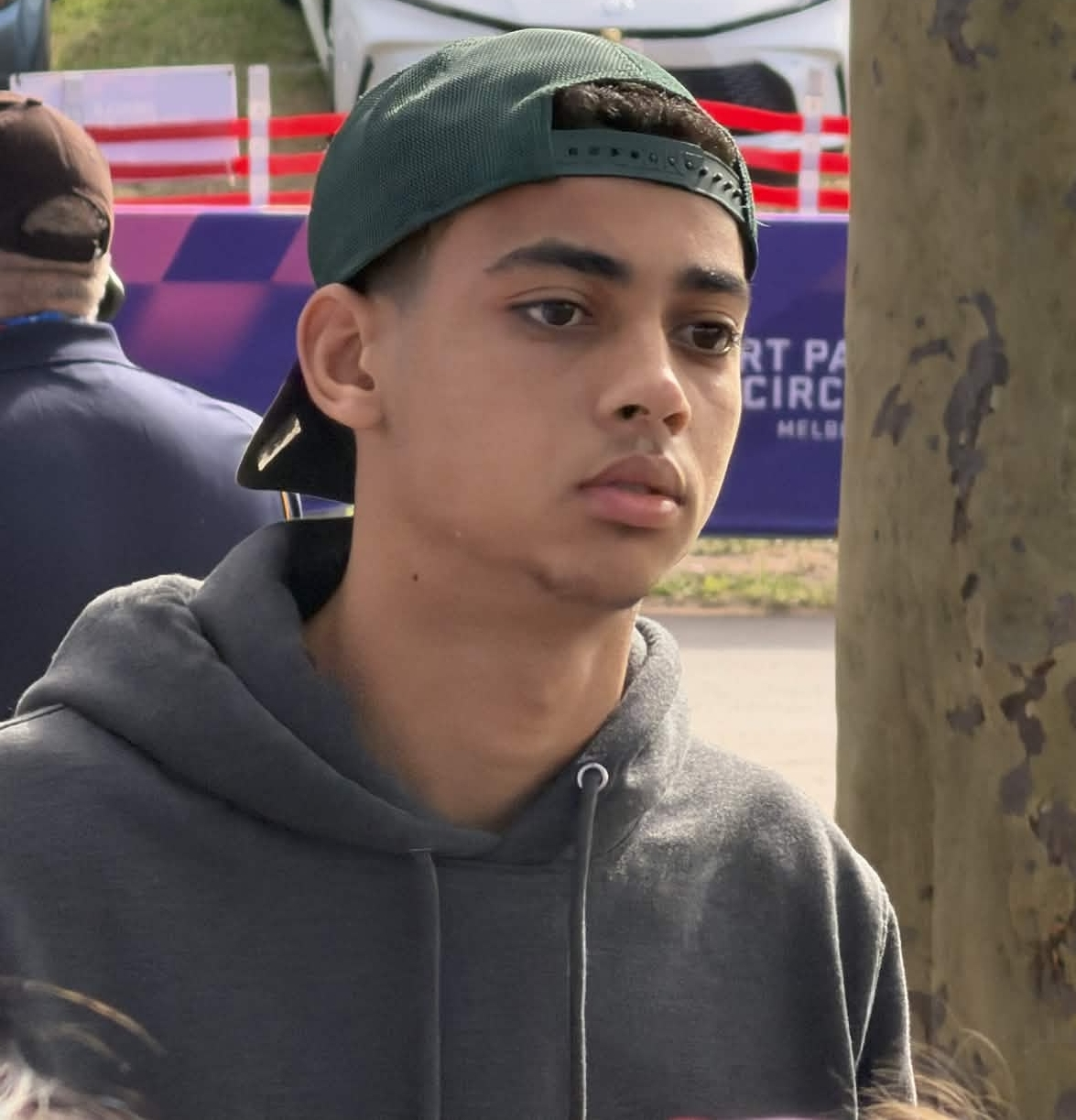
Ugo Ugochukwu became the 2026 FIA Formula 3 Champion, while his team, Campos Racing, won the Teams' Championship.

The 2026 FIA Formula 3 Championship was a motor racing championship for Formula 3 cars sanctioned by the Fédération Internationale de l'Automobile (FIA). The championship was the seventeenth season of Formula 3 racing since the inception of the GP3 Series and the eighth season run under the FIA Formula 3 Championship moniker. FIA Formula 3 is an open-wheel racing category serving as the third tier of formula racing in the FIA Global Pathway. The category was run in support of selected rounds of the 2026 FIA Formula One World Championship. As the championship is a spec series, all teams and drivers who competed in the championship ran the same car, the Dallara F3 2025.

Ugo Ugochukwu won the Drivers' Championship with Campos Racing in his second season of the FIA Formula 3 Championship after finishing second in the final race of the season in Madrid.

Campos Racing entered the season as the reigning Teams' Champions, having secured their inaugural title at the final race of the 2025 season at Monza. They managed to defend the Teams' Championship title in 2026, winning it at the first race in the final round of the season at the Madring.

== Entries ==
The following teams and drivers competed in the 2026 FIA Formula 3 Championship. As the championship is a spec series, all teams competed with an identical Dallara F3 2025 chassis with a 3.4 L (207 cu in) naturally-aspirated V6 engine developed by Mecachrome. All teams competed with tyres supplied by Pirelli.

Entrant	No.	Driver name	Rounds
(Spain) Campos Racing	1	(France) Théophile Naël	All
(Spain) Campos Racing	2	(United States) Ugo Ugochukwu	All
(Spain) Campos Racing	3	(Australia) Patrick Heuzenroeder	1
(Spain) Campos Racing	3	(Mexico) Ernesto Rivera	2–9
(Italy) Trident	4	(Denmark) Noah Strømsted	All
(Italy) Trident	5	(United Kingdom) Freddie Slater	All
(Italy) Trident	6	(Italy) Matteo De Palo	All
(Netherlands) MP Motorsport	7	(Argentina) Mattia Colnaghi	All
(Netherlands) MP Motorsport	8	(Finland) Tuukka Taponen	All
(Netherlands) MP Motorsport	9	(France) Alessandro Giusti	All
(France) ART Grand Prix	10	(Japan) Taito Kato	All
(France) ART Grand Prix	11	(Poland) Maciej Gładysz	All
(France) ART Grand Prix	12	(Japan) Kanato Le	All
(Netherlands) Van Amersfoort Racing	14	(Japan) Hiyu Yamakoshi	All
(Netherlands) Van Amersfoort Racing	15	(France) Enzo Deligny	All
(Netherlands) Van Amersfoort Racing	16	(Spain) Bruno del Pino	All
(New Zealand) Rodin Motorsport	17	(Brazil) Pedro Clerot	All
(New Zealand) Rodin Motorsport	18	(Italy) Brando Badoer	All
(New Zealand) Rodin Motorsport	19	(Singapore) Christian Ho	1–8
(New Zealand) Rodin Motorsport	19	(Italy) Niccolò Maccagnani	9
(Italy) Prema Racing	20	(New Zealand) Louis Sharp	1–7
(Italy) Prema Racing	20	(United States) Alex Powell	8–9
(Italy) Prema Racing	21	(Australia) James Wharton	All
(Italy) Prema Racing	22	(Mexico) José Garfias	All
(United Kingdom) Hitech	23	(South Korea) Michael Shin	All
(United Kingdom) Hitech	24	(Republic of Ireland) Fionn McLaughlin	All
(United Kingdom) Hitech	25	(Japan) Jin Nakamura	All
(United Arab Emirates) AIX Racing	26	(United States) Brad Benavides	1–2
(United Arab Emirates) AIX Racing	26	(Mexico) Ricardo Escotto	3, 5–6, 8
(United Arab Emirates) AIX Racing	26	(Colombia) Salim Hanna	4, 7
(United Arab Emirates) AIX Racing	27	(Sri Lanka) Yevan David	All
(United Arab Emirates) AIX Racing	28	(Brazil) Fernando Barrichello	All
(France) DAMS Lucas Oil	29	(Italy) Nicola Lacorte	All
(France) DAMS Lucas Oil	30	(Thailand) Nandhavud Bhirombhakdi	All
(France) DAMS Lucas Oil	31	(China) Gerrard Xie	1–8

=== Team changes ===
Hitech ended their partnership with Toyota Gazoo Racing after one season, dropping the 'TGR' moniker from its name.

=== Driver changes ===
Campos Racing had an all-new lineup after Nikola Tsolov, Mari Boya and Tasanapol Inthraphuvasak all graduated to Formula 2, with Tsolov remaining with Campos, Boya moving to Prema Racing and Inthraphuvasak joining ART Grand Prix. The team signed two sophomore drivers in 2025 Macau Grand Prix winner Théophile Naël, who left Van Amersfoort Racing after finishing eighth with the team in 2025, and Ugo Ugochukwu, who left Prema Racing after ending the 2025 season 16th. Red Bull Junior driver Ernesto Rivera completed Campos' lineup on his graduation from their Eurocup-3 outfit.

Reigning champion Rafael Câmara stepped up to Formula 2 with Invicta Racing, while Charlie Wurz left the series to compete in Super Formula with Team Goh. The team signed FRECA champion Freddie Slater and promoted runner-up Matteo De Palo for their full-season debut after Slater already deputised for two rounds for AIX Racing and Hitech in 2025.

Both Bruno del Pino and Tim Tramnitz left MP Motorsport, with Del Pino joining Van Amersfoort Racing, and Tramnitz moving to GT World Challenge Europe Endurance Cup with ROWE Racing. To replace them, the team signed reigning Eurocup-3 champion Mattia Colnaghi, who also joined the Red Bull Junior Team, as well as Ferrari junior driver Tuukka Taponen, who departed ART Grand Prix after coming ninth in 2025.

ART Grand Prix reset their lineup as Tuukka Taponen joined MP Motorsport, James Wharton joined Prema Racing and Laurens van Hoepen moved to Formula 2 with Trident. The team signed Eurocup-3 winter series champion Maciej Gładysz, who finished tenth in Eurocup-3, and promoted 2024 French F4 Champion Taito Kato and Kanato Le from their FRECA outfit, where they finished the 2025 season in seventh and 14th, respectively.

Van Amersfoort Racing had an all-new line-up, as Théophile Naël moved to Campos Racing while Santiago Ramos and Ivan Domingues left the team. They promoted Hiyu Yamakoshi from its FRECA outfit, who finished ninth, and signed Bruno del Pino, who left MP Motorsport after finishing the 2025 season in 23rd. In September 2025, it was announced that Jesse Carrasquedo Jr., who deputised for Hitech for two rounds in 2025, would drive for the team in 2026. However, he vacated his seat indefinitely for personal reasons ahead of the start of the season, and was replaced by Enzo Deligny, who finished third with R-ace GP.

Rodin Motorsport also had three new drivers with Louis Sharp moving to Prema, Callum Voisin competing in Porsche Carrera Cup GB with Century Motorsport and Roman Bilinski graduating to Formula 2 with DAMS. The team signed Brando Badoer, who in turn left Prema after finishing his debut season with the team in 25th, 2024 Eurocup-3 champion Christian Ho, who departed DAMS after coming 22nd in 2025, and Pedro Clerot graduated from FRECA, where he finished fourth with Van Amersfoort Racing.

Brando Badoer, Ugo Ugochukwu, and Noel León all left Prema Racing as Badoer and Ugochukwu moved to Rodin Motorsport and Campos Racing respectively, while León stepped up to Formula 2 with Campos Racing. James Wharton returned to Prema, departing ART Grand Prix after finishing his full-time debut season in 18th. 2024 GB3 Champion Louis Sharp joined Prema for his sophomore season after a 26th place with Rodin Motorsport in 2025. The team initially signed Enzo Deligny, but he left the team ahead of the start of the season to join Van Amersfoort Racing instead. The seat was taken by José Garfias, who finished fourth in Euroformula Open with Motopark, and made a one-round appearance in 2025 with AIX Racing.

Hitech also renewed their lineup after Martinius Stenshorne stepped up to Formula 2 with Rodin Motorsport, Gerrard Xie moved to DAMS and none of the team's four part-time competitors returned. Hitech signed a returnee and two championship debutants: Genesis Magma Racing's Trajectory Program driver Michael Shin who made his FIA F3 debut in 2023 with PHM Racing by Charouz and has since been competing in Euroformula Open with Team Motopark where he finished 3rd, TGR protégé Jin Nakamura stepped up from FRECA, where he finished 10th with R-ace GP, and Red Bull junior Fionn McLaughlin entered FIA F3 after winning the 2025 F4 British Championship with Hitech's outfit.

AIX Racing had two new drivers as neither James Hedley nor Nicola Marinangeli returned to the team. To replace them, AIX signed two Euroformula Open graduates: Yevan David, the series runner-up who became the first Sri Lankan driver to compete in FIA Formula 3, and 7th placed Fernando Barrichello, who already deputised for Hedley at the team in the last round of the 2025 season.

DAMS Lucas Oil saw Christian Ho join Rodin Motorsport and Matías Zagazeta leave the series to compete in GT World Challenge Europe with AF Corse. To replace them, the team signed Thai driver Nandhavud Bhirombhakdi from FRECA, where he finished 16th with Trident, and Gerrard Xie, who joined the team after finishing last season in 29th driving for Hitech.

==== In-season changes ====
Ernesto Rivera suffered a vertebral injury while competing in Formula Regional Oceania earlier this year, which meant that he was unable to compete at the opening round in Melbourne. He was replaced by Eurocup-3 competitor and FIA F3 debutant Patrick Heuzenroeder, who already deputised for Rivera in pre-season testing.

Brad Benavides sustained injuries following a crash in the sprint race of the Monte Carlo round, which forced him to take a break from racing, and miss the rest of the season. Indy NXT driver Ricardo Escotto replaced him for the round at Circuit de Barcelona-Catalunya. FREC driver Salim Hanna then took over the car for the round at the Red Bull Ring, before Escotto then piloted the car in the Silverstone and Spa-Francorchamps rounds. Hanna again returned to drive the car for the round at the Hungaroring, before Escotto concluded the season by taking over the seat for the Monza and Madrid rounds.

Louis Sharp left Prema Racing ahead of the Monza round to focus on his 2027 commitments. He was replaced for the final two rounds of the season by Alex Powell, who stepped up from Eurocup-3, where he claimed two podiums in the first four rounds.

Christian Ho left Rodin Motorsport ahead of the Madrid round to focus on his enlistment for the mandatory National Service in Singapore. He was replaced by Ferrari junior driver Niccolò Maccagnani, who stepped up from Italian F4, where he claimed two wins. Ricardo Escotto and Gerrard Xie also missed the event due to a road traffic collision and an injury from Monza, respectively. Their AIX Racing and DAMS Lucas Oil seats, however, were left unentered.

== Calendar ==
Round	Circuit	Sprint race	Feature race(s)
1	(Australia) Albert Park Circuit, Melbourne	7 March	8 March
2	Circuit de Monaco, Monaco	6 June	7 June
3	(Spain) Circuit de Barcelona-Catalunya, Montmeló	13 June	14 June
4	(Austria) Red Bull Ring, Spielberg	27 June	28 June
5	(United Kingdom) Silverstone Circuit, Silverstone	4 July	5 July
6	(Belgium) Circuit de Spa-Francorchamps, Stavelot	18 July	19 July
7	(Hungary) Hungaroring, Mogyoród	25 July	26 July
8	(Italy) Monza Circuit, Monza	5 September	6 September
9	(Spain) Madring, Madrid	12 September	12–13 September

=== Calendar changes ===
- Formula 2 and FIA Formula 3 followed Formula One in replacing the round at Imola Circuit with a second round in Spain held at the newly-built Madring.
- A round was set to be held at Bahrain International Circuit, but was cancelled due to the Iran war. To compensate for the loss of the two races, the season finale at the Madring held an additional qualifying session and a second feature race.

== Regulation changes ==
2025 saw the championship use Aramco-supplied fuel containing 70% sustainable components, and a further increase in sustainability was planned for 2026 ahead of the series' goal of adopting fully synthetic fuels in 2027.

== Season report ==
=== Round 1: Australia ===
The season began at Albert Park Circuit with a Campos Racing one-two in qualifying; Théophile Naël on pole position, Ugo Ugochukwu second and Trident's Freddie Slater third.

Bruno del Pino started the reverse-grid sprint race from pole position by virtue of having qualified twelfth. Del Pino and teammate Enzo Deligny, who started second, held their positions at the start, whilst Noah Strømsted lost third place to Brando Badoer. On lap eight of twenty, Prema Racing teammates James Wharton and Louis Sharp collided heavily whilst battling for seventh place. The race was red-flagged and not resumed due to the damage to the barriers. The result was taken from the end of lap seven and points were only awarded to the top five finishers. Del Pino claimed his first Formula 3 victory and Deligny and Badoer achieved their first podiums in the series. Wharton and Sharp were withdrawn from the following day's feature race on medical grounds.

Pole-sitter Naël maintained the lead at the start of the feature race whilst Ugochukwu lost second place to Slater. Ugochukwu soon recovered the position and then passed Naël for first place on lap four. Nicola Lacorte briefly entered the podium positions after overtaking Slater, but soon dropped back and was then involved in a collision with Strømsted, for which Strømsted received a penalty. Further penalties were issued in the closing laps, with Naël and Lacorte both receiving penalties for false starts. A crash by Michael Shin on lap twenty brought out the safety car, which stayed out until the end of the race; the resulting bunching up of the field resulted in Naël, Strømsted and Lacorte all dropping out of the points after their penalties were applied. Ugochukwu took his first Formula 3 victory and was joined on the podium by Slater and Taito Kato, who had originally crossed the finish line in fifth but was promoted by the penalties for Naël and Strømsted. Ugochukwu's win placed him in the lead of the championship by seven points ahead of second-placed Del Pino.

=== Round 2: Monaco ===
The championship resumed at the Circuit de Monaco after a three-month long break caused by the cancellation of the Bahrain round. Qualifying was split into two groups, with Naël taking overall pole with a time of 1:24.471.

Hiyu Yamakoshi started from pole in the reverse-grid sprint race, which he led from start to finish amid chaotic incidents including a red flag, the most notable being an opening lap crash between Brad Benavides and Christian Ho. Benavides sustained a serious back injury and had to take a break from racing. Yamakoshi was later disqualified for a technical infringement caused by incorrectly mounted front push rods. Gerrard Xie inherited the victory for DAMS, with Del Pino and Pedro Clerot completing the podium.

In the feature race, Brando Badoer, driving for Rodin Motorsport, seized the lead from polesitter Naël at the start, and proceeded to lead the entirety of the race to take his maiden Formula 3 victory. Naël finished second, only half a second behind Badoer. Slater and Ugochukwu came in third and fourth respectively; this result was enough for Ugochukwu to retain his championship lead.

=== Round 3: Spain (Barcelona) ===
Naël claimed his third consecutive pole position at Circuit de Barcelona-Catalunya with a time of 1:28.263, narrowly ahead of teammate and championship leader Ugochukwu in another Campos front-row lockout.

The reverse-grid sprint race saw Xie initially lead from pole, until James Wharton passed him on lap 5. The race saw two safety car periods; the first came when Ernesto Rivera stopped in the final sector, the second followed after Ugochukwu spun into the gravel at Turn 3 while attempting a switchback on Enzo Deligny. Wharton defended his position strongly at both restarts and set the fastest lap afterward, holding off a late challenge from Slater to take Prema's first win with the Dallara F3 2025 chassis and their first FIA F3 victory in nearly two years. Slater finished second, Xie third, with Tuukka Taponen fourth.

In the feature race, Naël converted pole into a lights-to-flag maiden Formula 3 victory in Campos' home country, leading every lap and resisting early pressure from Yamakoshi. Yamakoshi held onto second for his first podium after his earlier disqualification in Monaco, while Ugochukwu recovered from a poor start to finish third, completing a double podium for Campos. Badoer was fourth, followed by the Van Amersfoort Racing pair of Deligny and Del Pino. Rivera finished seventh after Slater received a five-second time penalty that dropped him to eighth. The result moved Naël to second in the standings behind Ugochukwu, with Del Pino third. Campos further extended their Teams' Championship lead.

=== Round 4: Austria ===
High temperatures at the Red Bull Ring made tyre management critical. Yamakoshi took pole for the feature race after a closely fought qualifying session which saw 27 drivers qualify within a second of the pole time.

In the reverse-grid sprint race, Wharton was on pole and kept the lead at the start, ahead of Ernesto Rivera. Contact between Trident teammates Noah Strømsted and Slater at turn 1 on the opening lap sent Slater spinning into retirement, which brought out the safety car. When the race restarted, Rivera pressured Wharton and eventually overtook him at turn 4 on lap 14. On the final lap, Wharton ran wide, allowing Pedro Clerot and Jin Nakamura to pass; Clerot also moved ahead of Nakamura during the same sequence. Rivera claimed his maiden Formula 3 victory, the first for a Campos driver in a sprint this season, with Clerot finishing second and Nakamura third.

The feature race began with Ugochukwu snatching the lead from pole-sitter Yamakoshi. Rivera spun early in the race and a turn 1 collision between Yevan David and Maciej Gładysz brought out the safety car. Later on, the Trident pair of Slater and Strømsted closed in on Ugochukwu, with Slater and Ugochukwu exchanging the lead on multiple occasions. On lap 23, Strømsted took advantage of the battle between the two ahead to pass Ugochukwu for second; he then overtook teammate Slater for the lead on the following lap. Ugochukwu took second from Slater on the final lap, after a fraught battle. Strømsted took his first win of the season and Trident's first victory of 2026, with Ugochukwu second and Slater third. Ugochukwu left Austria with a 16 point lead over Slater.

=== Round 5: United Kingdom ===
Slater took his maiden Formula 3 pole position on home turf at Silverstone, over a quarter of a second clear of Théophile Naël and Louis Sharp who qualified second and third respectively.

Ugochukwu, who ended up 12th in qualifying, started the reverse-grid sprint from pole as a result. He produced the most dominant victory in Formula 3 history in the sprint, winning by a record 17.023 seconds, leading every lap and taking the bonus point for fastest lap. Yevan David finished a distant second and became the first Sri Lankan driver to finish on the podium in a Formula 3 race, while Naël charged through from 11th on the grid to snatch third from Matteo De Palo in the final corner of the last lap.

The feature race saw Trident teammates Slater and De Palo battle at the head of the field, with both drivers having stints in the lead. The safety car was brought out on lap 18 of 21 after Ricardo Escotto stopped on track with damage sustained from contact with Nandhavud Bhirombhakdi, it came in at the end of the penultimate lap resulting in a one lap shootout. De Palo crossed the line first after fending off multiple overtaking attempts from Slater, and slight contact between the two at Copse dropped the latter down to what was initially sixth over the finish line. However, De Palo was disqualified post-race after the diffuser of his car was found to be below the minimum height requirement. Naël and Rivera crossed the line in second and third behind De Palo but they also received time penalties for separate infringements; this promoted ART's Maciej Gładysz to his maiden Formula 3 victory. Slater was moved back up to second and Ugochukwu to third after all the penalties were applied. Ugochukwu had a championship lead of 18 points over Slater at the end of the round.

=== Round 6: Belgium ===
A chaotic qualifying at Spa-Francorchamps saw Slater claim his second consecutive pole. The session initially began on a greasy track and as the track dried up, drivers began searching for a tow on their warm-up laps, bunching up the field and resulting in a multi-car accident that brought out the red flag. 11 drivers received grid penalties as a result, including Ugochukwu.

Jin Nakamura, driving for Hitech, won the sprint race after passing reverse-grid pole-sitter Brando Badoer at a safety car restart, and then absorbing pressure from the latter for the remainder of the race. Badoer and Rodin teammate Pedro Clerot finished second and third. Championship rivals Ugochukwu and Slater made contact on the opening lap at Les Combes, which resulted in both ending up in the gravel; Slater retired on the spot, whereas Ugochukwu had to pit for repairs and went a lap down, eventually ending as the last classified finisher in 29th.

Slater dropped down the order from pole at the start of the feature race as his Trident kicked into anti-stall mode, with Hiyu Yamakoshi passing Tuukka Taponen down the Kemmel Straight to take the lead. A collision between De Palo and David led to both drivers retiring and the deployment of the safety car. Slater steadily recovered lost ground when the race resumed and passed Yamakoshi for the lead, but he was unable to hold off Rivera who charged through from fourth on the grid. Rivera went on to take his second victory of the season, and Yamakoshi was able to repass Slater to finish second. Third for Slater was enough for him to slash Ugochukwu's championship lead to a single point, as the latter finished outside the points again. Campos pulled further clear in the Teams' Championship.

=== Round 7: Hungary ===
Tuukka Taponen, driving for MP Motorsport, took his first Formula 3 pole position at the Hungaroring by 0.040 seconds, denying Slater a third consecutive pole.

In the reverse-grid sprint race, Théophile Naël moved from sixth to second on the opening lap, before overtaking polesitter Kanato Le on lap 9 and pulling away to take his second victory of the year. Le finished second for his maiden podium, with Rivera taking third. Ugochukwu ran as high as fifth, but fell to tenth after struggling with tyre degradation, and received a five-second time penalty for leaving the track and gaining an advantage, dropping him out of the points in favour of Slater. As a result, Ugochukwu and Slater were now tied on 104 points in the standings.

Taponen held on to the lead at the start of the feature race, but had to pit at the end of the second lap with a right-rear puncture from light contact with Slater. Slater took over the lead and controlled the race through multiple safety car periods to claim his first Formula 3 victory and the lead of the championship. He resisted pressure from title rival Ugochukwu, who overtook Badoer and Mattia Colnaghi round the outside in one move to take second. Naël was initially fifth, but received a pair of penalties for forcing Taponen off the track on multiple occasions; this dropped him out of the points. Unusually, both races saw Maciej Gładysz, Jin Nakamura and Gerrard Xie come together on the opening lap.

Slater moved into the championship lead for the first time on 130 points, with Ugochukwu second on 122, Naël third on 75, Rivera fourth on 72 and Badoer fifth on 71. Campos Racing continued to lead the Teams' Championship going into the summer break, with a total of 269 points.

=== Round 8: Italy ===
Qualifying was again split into two groups for the penultimate round at Monza, with Slater taking pole for the third time in four rounds after setting the overall fastest time across both groups. His Trident teammate Matteo De Palo set the fastest time in the other group and was set to start second in the feature race, but was later disqualified due to the diffuser on his car being below the required minimum height; Kanato Le was promoted to the front row as a result. Ugochukwu would start both races in 23rd after receiving a grid penalty for an incident with De Palo in practice.

A chaotic sprint race saw two safety car periods and the early race leaders falling by the wayside; a five-car battle for the lead at the beginning of lap 5 saw Fernando Barrichello and reverse-grid pole-sitter Badoer make contact on the main straight, with Barrichello having to retire while Badoer and Taponen had to pit for repairs and dropped to the rear of the field. When racing resumed, Badoer's Rodin teammate Pedro Clerot moved into the lead after passing Alessandro Giusti but had to retire soon afterwards due to an engine failure, with a separate incident further down the field between Michael Shin and Gerrard Xie resulting in the second safety car period. This set up a late battle for the win between Giusti, Taito Kato, Hiyu Yamakoshi and Slater. Kato eventually came out on top after charging through from tenth on the grid, with Slater and Yamakoshi finishing second and third, both less than a second behind the winner. Yevan David passed Giusti on the last lap to finish fourth after starting 17th, while Ugochukwu finished outside the points and dropped further behind Slater.

Slater led from pole in the early stages of the feature race, before being passed by the ART duo of Le and Kato on lap 6. He continued dropping down the order in subsequent laps, before eventually retiring after a mechanical failure caused a wheel on his car to detach completely. Nicola Lacorte took the lead from Le on lap 10, and managed a safety car restart and held off late pressure from Taponen to win on home soil. Taponen took his first podium of the year with second, while Kato added a third place in the feature race to his sprint win, and David again charged from 17th on the grid to finish fourth. Ugochukwu managed to recover to eighth, and coupled with Slater's retirement closed the gap to the latter to 15 points.

=== Round 9: Spain (Madrid) ===
At the final round of the season in the newly-built Madring, three races were held in order to compensate for the cancelled round at Bahrain, with two feature races and one sprint. There were two qualifying sessions as a result, the first session determining the grid for the first feature race and the sprint, and the second session determining the grid for the second feature race. Taito Kato and Tuukka Taponen continued their recent run of good form by taking pole for the first and second feature race respectively. Championship contender Ugochukwu qualified fourth and second for the two feature races; this gave him the upper hand in the title battle after leader Slater struggled throughout and only managed 17th and eighth.

James Wharton started on pole in the final sprint of the year and battled for the lead with Théophile Naël on the first lap, before eventually conceding the position after cutting the turn 5 chicane. Naël proceeded to rapidly distance himself from the rest of the field, eventually winning by 8.9 seconds from Wharton. Alex Powell, driving as a replacement for Louis Sharp, took third in his second F2 weekend and made it a double podium for Prema.

A multicar pileup on the opening lap of the first feature race resulted in a red flag. The incident began when the Van Amersfoort Racing pair of Bruno del Pino and Enzo Deligny came together at the entry of turn 8, with a resulting concertina effect collecting multiple other cars. All drivers emerged unharmed. When the race resumed, Pedro Clerot, who had got the jump on pole-sitter Kato off the line, led the field away in a rolling start. A processional race with few position changes throughout saw Clerot claim his first Formula 3 win, with Kato and Taponen taking second and third. Ugochukwu finished fourth while Slater retired after spinning and hitting the wall on lap 10 when running outside the points; as a result, the two drivers were tied on 141 points heading into the final race, with Ugochukwu ahead on countback. Ugochukwu's fourth place, along with eighth and ninth place finishes for Ernesto Rivera and Naël, ensured that Campos Racing won the Teams' Championship for the second year in a row.

Taponen led away from pole at the start of the season finale, with Ugochukwu slotting into second behind him. Slater, who needed to finish ahead of Ugochukwu to win the championship, was unable to make much progress, with overtaking proving incredibly difficult around the Madring circuit. Taponen led from lights-to-flag to take his maiden Formula 3 win, and became the fifteenth different winner of the season. Ugochukwu followed him home in second and was crowned the 2026 Formula 3 Drivers' Champion, becoming the first American driver to do so. Clerot completed the podium in third, while Slater couldn't manage any higher than eighth.

At the end of the season, Ugochukwu's tally of 159 points was enough for him to win the Drivers' Championship, with Slater second on 145 after a seesaw battle which was only decided in the final race of the year. Taponen and Kato's strong late-season form moved them to third and fourth in the standings on 109 and 105 points respectively, ahead of Naël, Clerot and Rivera. Campos retained the Teams' Championship, with their lineup of Ugochukwu, Naël and Rivera amassing a total of 334 points between them, and their three drivers being the only ones on the entire grid to have won more than once all season. Trident and MP Motorsport took second and third in the Teams standings, albeit over 100 points behind Campos.

== Results and standings ==
=== Season summary ===
Round		Circuit	Pole position	Fastest lap	Winning driver	Winning team	Report
1	SR	(Australia) Albert Park Circuit		(New Zealand) Louis Sharp (Note: Louis Sharp set the fastest lap and would have scored the point for it, but later received a ten-second time penalty for causing a collision. This dropped him out of the top ten, making him ineligible to score the point. James Wharton would have scored the point for setting the fastest lap among those finishing in the top ten, but as less than 50% of the scheduled race distance was completed, he was not awarded the point for it.)	(Spain) Bruno del Pino	(Netherlands) Van Amersfoort Racing	Report
1	FR	(Australia) Albert Park Circuit	(France) Théophile Naël	(Spain) Bruno del Pino	(United States) Ugo Ugochukwu	(Spain) Campos Racing	Report
2	SR	Circuit de Monaco		(Australia) James Wharton (Note: James Wharton set the fastest lap but did not finish in the top ten, so he was ineligible to score the point for it. Ugo Ugochukwu scored the point for setting the fastest lap among those finishing in the top ten.)	(China) Gerrard Xie (Note: Hiyu Yamakoshi originally won the race, but was later disqualified as the front push rods of his car were mounted incorrectly. Gerrard Xie, initially classified second, inherited the win.)	(France) DAMS Lucas Oil	Report
2	FR	Circuit de Monaco	(France) Théophile Naël	(Australia) James Wharton (Note: James Wharton set the fastest lap but did not finish in the top ten, so he was ineligible to score the point for it. Freddie Slater scored the point for setting the fastest lap among those finishing in the top ten.)	(Italy) Brando Badoer	(New Zealand) Rodin Motorsport	Report
3	SR	(Spain) Circuit de Barcelona-Catalunya		(Australia) James Wharton	(Australia) James Wharton	(Italy) Prema Racing	Report
3	FR	(Spain) Circuit de Barcelona-Catalunya	(France) Théophile Naël	(Japan) Hiyu Yamakoshi	(France) Théophile Naël	(Spain) Campos Racing	Report
4	SR	(Austria) Red Bull Ring		(New Zealand) Louis Sharp (Note: Louis Sharp set the fastest lap but did not finish in the top ten, so he was ineligible to score the point for it. Kanato Le originally scored the point for setting the fastest lap among those finishing in the top ten, but was later disqualified due to an underweight car. As a result, Pedro Clerot was awarded the point.)	(Mexico) Ernesto Rivera	(Spain) Campos Racing	Report
4	FR	(Austria) Red Bull Ring	(Japan) Hiyu Yamakoshi	(France) Théophile Naël (Note: Théophile Naël set the fastest lap but did not finish in the top ten, so he was ineligible to score the point for it. Noah Strømsted scored the point for setting the fastest lap among those finishing in the top ten.)	(Denmark) Noah Strømsted	(Italy) Trident	Report
5	SR	(United Kingdom) Silverstone Circuit		(United States) Ugo Ugochukwu	(United States) Ugo Ugochukwu	(Spain) Campos Racing	Report
5	FR	(United Kingdom) Silverstone Circuit	(United Kingdom) Freddie Slater	(Mexico) Ernesto Rivera	(Poland) Maciej Gładysz (Note: Matteo De Palo originally won the race, but was later disqualified as the rear diffuser of his car was below the minimum height required. Ernesto Rivera, initially classified second, would have inherited the win, but later received a five-second time penalty for failing to follow Race Director instructions. As a result, Maciej Gładysz, initially classified third, inherited the win.)	(France) ART Grand Prix	Report
6	SR	(Belgium) Circuit de Spa-Francorchamps		(United States) Ugo Ugochukwu (Note: Ugo Ugochukwu set the fastest lap but did not finish in the top ten, so he was ineligible to score the point for it. Jin Nakamura scored the point for setting the fastest lap among those finishing in the top ten.)	(Japan) Jin Nakamura	(United Kingdom) Hitech	Report
6	FR	(Belgium) Circuit de Spa-Francorchamps	(United Kingdom) Freddie Slater	(United States) Ugo Ugochukwu (Note: Ugo Ugochukwu set the fastest lap but did not finish in the top ten, so he was ineligible to score the point for it. Taito Kato scored the point for setting the fastest lap among those finishing in the top ten.)	(Mexico) Ernesto Rivera	(Spain) Campos Racing	Report
7	SR	(Hungary) Hungaroring		(Finland) Tuukka Taponen	(France) Théophile Naël	(Spain) Campos Racing	Report
7	FR	(Hungary) Hungaroring	(Finland) Tuukka Taponen	(Italy) Matteo De Palo (Note: Matteo De Palo set the fastest lap but did not finish in the top ten, so he was ineligible to score the point for it. Freddie Slater scored the point for setting the fastest lap among those finishing in the top ten.)	(United Kingdom) Freddie Slater	(Italy) Trident	Report
8	SR	(Italy) Monza Circuit		(Finland) Tuukka Taponen (Note: Tuukka Taponen set the fastest lap but did not finish in the top ten, so he was ineligible to score the point for it. Taito Kato scored the point for setting the fastest lap among those finishing in the top ten.)	(Japan) Taito Kato	(France) ART Grand Prix	Report
8	FR	(Italy) Monza Circuit	(United Kingdom) Freddie Slater	(Spain) Bruno del Pino (Note: Bruno del Pino set the fastest lap but did not finish in the top ten, so he was ineligible to score the point for it. Enzo Deligny scored the point for setting the fastest lap among those finishing in the top ten.)	(Italy) Nicola Lacorte	(France) DAMS Lucas Oil	Report
9	SR	(Spain) Madring		(France) Théophile Naël	(France) Théophile Naël	(Spain) Campos Racing	Report
9	FR1	(Spain) Madring	(Japan) Taito Kato	(Finland) Tuukka Taponen	(Brazil) Pedro Clerot	(New Zealand) Rodin Motorsport	Report
9	FR2	(Spain) Madring	(Finland) Tuukka Taponen	(Italy) Nicola Lacorte (Note: Nicola Lacorte set the fastest lap but did not finish in the top ten, so he was ineligible to score the point for it. Tuukka Taponen scored the point for setting the fastest lap among those finishing in the top ten.)	(Finland) Tuukka Taponen	(Netherlands) MP Motorsport	Report

=== Scoring system ===
Points were awarded to the top ten classified finishers in both races. (Note: In the event of a race ending prematurely, the number of points-paying positions could be reduced, depending on how much of the race has been completed.) The pole-sitter in the feature race also received two points, and one point was given to the driver within the top ten who set the fastest lap in both the feature and sprint races. No extra points were awarded to the pole-sitter in the sprint race as the grid for it was set by reversing the top twelve qualifiers.

Sprint race points

Points were awarded to the top ten classified finishers. A bonus point was awarded to the driver who set the fastest lap within the top ten finishers.

Position	1st	2nd	3rd	4th	5th	6th	7th	8th	9th	10th	FL
Points	10	9	8	7	6	5	4	3	2	1	1

Feature race points

Points were awarded to the top ten classified finishers. Bonus points were awarded to the pole-sitter and to the driver who set the fastest lap within the top ten finishers.

Position	1st	2nd	3rd	4th	5th	6th	7th	8th	9th	10th	Pole	FL
Points	25	18	15	12	10	8	6	4	2	1	2	1

=== Drivers' Championship standings ===
Pos.	Driver	ALB (Australia)		MON (Monaco)		CAT (Spain)		RBR (Austria)		SIL (United Kingdom)		SPA (Belgium)		HUN (Hungary)		MNZ (Italy)		MAD (Spain)			Points
Pos.	Driver	SR (Note: As more than 25% but less than 50% of the scheduled race distance was completed, reduced points were awarded on a 5–4–3–2–1 basis to the top five finishers. Additionally, as less than 50% of the scheduled race distance was completed, no points were awarded for the fastest lap of the race.)	FR	SR	FR	SR	FR	SR	FR	SR	FR	SR	FR	SR	FR	SR	FR	SR	FR1	FR2	Points
1	(United States) Ugo Ugochukwu	8	1	6^{F}	4	Ret	3	9	2	1^{F}	3	29	20	17	2	13	8	8	4	2	159
2	(United Kingdom) Freddie Slater	9	2	19	3^{F}	2	8	Ret	3	7	2^{P}	Ret	3^{P}	10	1^{F}	2	Ret^{P}	18	Ret	8	145
3	(Finland) Tuukka Taponen	12	13	Ret	Ret	4	14	6	7	17	12	7	7	6^{F}	5^{P}	Ret	2	10	3^{F}	1^{P F}	109
4	(Japan) Taito Kato	5	3	16	11	15	9	7	6	18	25	5	6^{F}	14	13	1^{F}	3	9	2^{P}	4	105
5	(France) Théophile Naël	10	12^{P}	24	2^{P}	8	1^{P}	15	15	3	14	6	15	1	20	11	17	1^{F}	9	12	88
6	(Brazil) Pedro Clerot	14	8	3	8	13	16	2^{F}	4	20	9	3	12	21	15	Ret	21	11	1	3	88
7	(Mexico) Ernesto Rivera			Ret	5	Ret	7	1	18	14	10^{F}	8	1	3	6	7	Ret	6	8	9	87
8	(Italy) Brando Badoer	3	16	Ret	1	10	4	21	21	19	17	2	14	5	3	23	24	21	17	11	71
9	(Japan) Hiyu Yamakoshi	20	11	DSQ	13	7	2^{F}	8	8^{P}	12	8	26	2	26	10	3	6	17	15	Ret	71
10	(Denmark) Noah Strømsted	4	23	5	10	11	11	5	1^{F}	5	5	10	10	20	12	15	7	20	16	21	65
11	(Spain) Bruno del Pino	1	4^{F}	2	6	6	6	10	17	21	18	15	11	18	14	10	12	4	Ret	17	57
12	(Poland) Maciej Gładysz	6	5	8	24	23	10	13	Ret	6	1	12	5	Ret	Ret	Ret	18	19	Ret	22	54
13	(Argentina) Mattia Colnaghi	30	10	11	19	Ret	18	17	20	15	20	4	4	4	4	6	19	14	12	5	54
14	(Japan) Jin Nakamura	13	9	7	23	18	22	3	5	13	15	1^{F}	8	Ret	Ret	12	20	7	5	15	53
15	(France) Alessandro Giusti	21	15	4	7	12	17	11	22	11	13	9	9	13	17	5	25†	5	6	6	45
16	(France) Enzo Deligny	2	6	23	14	5	5	20	12	22	16	17	25	16	Ret	8	9^{F}	15	Ret	7	40
17	(Australia) James Wharton	7	WD	15	18	1^{F}	12	4	11	10	11	27	17	8	7	21	10	2	10	16	39
18	(Sri Lanka) Yevan David	22	20	21	20	19	27	19	Ret	2	7	16	Ret	11	23	4	4	16	11	10	35
19	(Italy) Nicola Lacorte	11	25	22	27†	16	Ret	12	9	23	Ret	14	18	7	18	9	1	23	20	20	33
20	(Japan) Kanato Le	28	Ret	9	17	14	13	DSQ	10	16	6	18	23	2	Ret	24†	5	24	13	19	30
21	(New Zealand) Louis Sharp	16^{F}	WD	17	12	9	19	14	13	8	4	13	16	12	8						21
22	(China) Gerrard Xie	19	19	1	9	3	15	16	25	29	22	21	21	28	Ret	Ret	Ret				20
23	(United States) Alex Powell															19	14	3	7	13	14
24	(Italy) Matteo De Palo	26	22	14	25	25	20	18	14	4	DSQ	28	Ret	27	21	20	16	12	14	18	7
25	(United States) Brad Benavides	17	7	Ret	WD																6
26	(Singapore) Christian Ho	18	21	Ret	16	26	28	22	16	30	26	11	24	22	9	18	13				2
27	(Republic of Ireland) Fionn McLaughlin	15	14	13	21	20	26	28	24	9	19	23	13	19	16	14	Ret	13	Ret	14	2
28	(Brazil) Fernando Barrichello	27	18	20	Ret	17	24	23	Ret	24	27†	20	Ret	9	Ret	Ret	Ret	25	Ret	23	2
29	(Mexico) José Garfias	24	24	10	15	27	21	24	23	26	21	19	22	15	11	17	11	22	Ret	26	1
30	(Thailand) Nandhavud Bhirombhakdi	29	Ret	12	22	24	25	27	26	25	24	25	DNS	25	19	16	23	27	19	27	0
31	(Mexico) Ricardo Escotto					22	23			28	Ret	22	26			22	15				0
32	(Australia) Patrick Heuzenroeder	23	17																		0
33	(South Korea) Michael Shin	25	Ret	18	26	21	29	25	Ret	27	23	24	19	23	22	Ret	22	26	Ret	25	0
34	(Italy) Niccolò Maccagnani																	28	18	24	0
35	(Colombia) Salim Hanna							26	19					24	Ret						0
Pos.	Driver	SR	FR	SR	FR	SR	FR	SR	FR	SR	FR	SR	FR	SR	FR	SR	FR	SR	FR1	FR2	Points
Pos.	Driver	ALB (Australia)		MON (Monaco)		CAT (Spain)		RBR (Austria)		SIL (United Kingdom)		SPA (Belgium)		HUN (Hungary)		MNZ (Italy)		MAD (Spain)			Points

Key
Colour	Result
Gold	Winner
Silver	Second place
Bronze	Third place
Green	Other points position
Blue	Other classified position
Blue	Not classified, finished (NC)
Purple	Not classified, retired (Ret)
Red	Did not qualify (DNQ)
Black	Disqualified (DSQ)
White	Did not start (DNS)
White	Race cancelled (C)
Blank	Did not practice (DNP)
Blank	Excluded (EX)
Blank	Did not arrive (DNA)
Blank	Withdrawn (WD)
Blank	Did not enter (empty cell)
Annotation	Meaning
P	Pole position
F	Fastest lap

† – Driver did not finish the race, but was classified as he completed more than 90% of the race distance.

=== Teams' Championship standings ===
Pos.	Team	ALB (Australia)		MON (Monaco)		CAT (Spain)		RBR (Austria)		SIL (United Kingdom)		SPA (Belgium)		HUN (Hungary)		MNZ (Italy)		MAD (Spain)			Points
Pos.	Team	SR	FR	SR	FR	SR	FR	SR	FR	SR	FR	SR	FR	SR	FR	SR	FR	SR	FR1	FR2	Points
1	(Spain) Campos Racing	8	1	6^{F}	2^{P}	8	1^{P}	1	2	1^{F}	3	6	1	1	2	7	8	1^{F}	4	2	334
1	(Spain) Campos Racing	10	12^{P}	24	4	Ret	3	9	15	3	10^{F}	8	15	3	6	11	17	6	8	9	334
1	(Spain) Campos Racing	23	17	Ret	5	Ret	7	15	18	14	14	29	20	17	20	13	Ret	8	9	12	334
2	(Italy) Trident	4	2	5	3^{F}	2	8	5	1^{F}	4	2^{P}	10	3^{P}	10	1^{F}	2	7	12	14	8	217
2	(Italy) Trident	9	22	14	10	11	11	18	3	5	5	28	10	20	12	15	16	18	16	18	217
2	(Italy) Trident	26	23	19	25	25	20	Ret	14	7	DSQ	Ret	Ret	27	21	20	Ret^{P}	20	Ret	21	217
3	(Netherlands) MP Motorsport	12	10	4	7	4	14	6	7	11	12	4	4	4	4	5	2	5	3^{F}	1^{P F}	208
3	(Netherlands) MP Motorsport	21	13	11	19	12	17	11	20	15	13	7	7	6^{F}	5^{P}	6	19	10	6	5	208
3	(Netherlands) MP Motorsport	30	15	Ret	Ret	Ret	18	17	22	17	20	9	9	13	17	Ret	25†	14	12	6	208
4	(France) ART Grand Prix	5	3	8	11	14	9	7	6	6	1	5	5	2	13	1^{F}	3	9	2^{P}	4	189
4	(France) ART Grand Prix	6	5	9	17	15	10	13	10	16	6	12	6^{F}	14	Ret	24†	5	19	13	19	189
4	(France) ART Grand Prix	28	Ret	16	24	23	13	DSQ	Ret	18	25	18	23	Ret	Ret	Ret	18	24	Ret	22	189
5	(Netherlands) Van Amersfoort Racing	1	4^{F}	2	6	5	2^{F}	8	8^{P}	12	8	15	2	16	10	3	6	4	15	7	168
5	(Netherlands) Van Amersfoort Racing	2	6	23	13	6	5	10	12	21	16	17	11	18	14	8	9^{F}	15	Ret	17	168
5	(Netherlands) Van Amersfoort Racing	20	11	DSQ	14	7	6	20	17	22	18	26	25	26	Ret	10	12	17	Ret	Ret	168
6	(New Zealand) Rodin Motorsport	3	8	3	1	10	4	2^{F}	4	19	9	2	12	5	3	18	13	11	1	3	161
6	(New Zealand) Rodin Motorsport	14	16	Ret	8	13	16	21	16	20	17	3	14	21	9	23	21	21	17	11	161
6	(New Zealand) Rodin Motorsport	18	21	Ret	16	26	28	22	21	30	26	11	24	22	15	Ret	24	28	18	24	161
7	(Italy) Prema Racing	7	24	10	12	1^{F}	12	4	11	8	4	13	16	8	7	17	10	2	7	13	75
7	(Italy) Prema Racing	16^{F}	WD	15	15	9	19	14	13	10	11	19	17	12	8	19	11	3	10	16	75
7	(Italy) Prema Racing	24	WD	17	18	27	21	24	23	26	21	27	22	15	11	21	14	22	Ret	26	75
8	(United Kingdom) Hitech	13	9	7	21	18	22	3	5	9	15	1^{F}	8	19	16	12	20	7	5	14	55
8	(United Kingdom) Hitech	15	14	13	23	20	26	25	24	13	19	23	13	23	22	14	22	13	Ret	15	55
8	(United Kingdom) Hitech	25	Ret	18	26	21	29	28	Ret	27	23	24	19	Ret	Ret	Ret	Ret	26	Ret	25	55
9	(France) DAMS Lucas Oil	11	19	1	9	3	15	12	9	23	22	14	18	7	18	9	1	23	19	20	53
9	(France) DAMS Lucas Oil	19	25	12	22	16	25	16	25	25	24	21	21	25	19	16	23	27	20	27	53
9	(France) DAMS Lucas Oil	29	Ret	22	27†	24	Ret	27	26	29	Ret	25	DNS	28	Ret	Ret	Ret				53
10	(United Arab Emirates) AIX Racing	17	7	20	20	17	23	19	19	2	7	16	26	9	23	4	4	16	11	10	43
10	(United Arab Emirates) AIX Racing	22	18	21	Ret	19	24	23	Ret	24	27†	20	Ret	11	Ret	22	15	25	Ret	23	43
10	(United Arab Emirates) AIX Racing	27	20	Ret	WD	22	27	26	Ret	28	Ret	22	Ret	24	Ret	Ret	Ret				43
Pos.	Team	SR	FR	SR	FR	SR	FR	SR	FR	SR	FR	SR	FR	SR	FR	SR	FR	SR	FR1	FR2	Points
Pos.	Team	ALB (Australia)		MON (Monaco)		CAT (Spain)		RBR (Austria)		SIL (United Kingdom)		SPA (Belgium)		HUN (Hungary)		MNZ (Italy)		MAD (Spain)			Points

Key
Colour	Result
Gold	Winner
Silver	Second place
Bronze	Third place
Green	Other points position
Blue	Other classified position
Blue	Not classified, finished (NC)
Purple	Not classified, retired (Ret)
Red	Did not qualify (DNQ)
Black	Disqualified (DSQ)
White	Did not start (DNS)
White	Race cancelled (C)
Blank	Did not practice (DNP)
Blank	Excluded (EX)
Blank	Did not arrive (DNA)
Blank	Withdrawn (WD)
Blank	Did not enter (empty cell)
Annotation	Meaning
P	Pole position
F	Fastest lap

† – Driver did not finish the race, but was classified as he completed more than 90% of the race distance.

The standings are sorted by best result; the rows are not related to the drivers. In case of a tie on points, the best positions achieved determined the outcome.
