= 2026 Melbourne Formula 3 round =

Motor racing event

(Australia) 2026 Melbourne Formula 3 round
Round details
- Round 1 of 9 (Note: At the time of the event Formula 3 planned to hold 10 rounds.) in the 2026 FIA Formula 3 Championship.
- Location: Albert Park Circuit; Melbourne, Victoria, Australia
- Course: Temporary street circuit 5.278 km (3.280 mi)

Sprint Race
- Date: 7 March 2026
- Laps: 7 (Note: Originally scheduled for 20 laps, the race was red flagged and not resumed on the eighth lap after James Wharton and Louis Sharp collided.)
Podium
First	(Spain) Bruno del Pino	Van Amersfoort Racing
Second	(France) Enzo Deligny	Van Amersfoort Racing
Third	(Italy) Brando Badoer	Rodin Motorsport
Fastest lap
Driver	(New Zealand) Louis Sharp (Note: Louis Sharp set the fastest lap and would have scored the point for it, but later received a ten-second time penalty for causing a collision. This dropped him out of the top ten, making him ineligible to score the point. James Wharton would have scored the point for setting the fastest lap among those finishing in the top ten, but as less than 50% of the scheduled race distance was completed, he was not awarded the point for it.)	Prema Racing
- Time: 1:37.955 (on lap 4)

Feature Race
- Date: 8 March 2026
- Laps: 23
Pole position
Driver	(France) Théophile Naël	Campos Racing
Time	1:34.187	
Podium
First	(United States) Ugo Ugochukwu	Campos Racing
Second	(United Kingdom) Freddie Slater	Trident
Third	(Japan) Taito Kato	ART Grand Prix
Fastest lap
Driver	(Spain) Bruno del Pino	Van Amersfoort Racing
- Time: 1:37.336 (on lap 5)

The 2026 Melbourne FIA Formula 3 round was a motor racing event held between 6 and 8 March 2026 at the Albert Park Circuit. It was the opening round of the 2026 FIA Formula 3 Championship and was held in support of the 2026 Australian Grand Prix.

== Report ==
=== Driver changes ===
Campos Racing announced that Ernesto Rivera would miss the race due to a back injury sustained in an accident during this year's Formula Regional Oceania Trophy competition. Patrick Husenroder stepped in to replace him.

== Classification ==
=== Qualifying ===
Qualifying was held on 6 March 2026, at 14:00 local time (UTC+11).

Pos.	No.	Driver	Entrant	Time/Gap	Grid SR	Grid FR
1	1	(France) Théophile Naël	Campos Racing	1:34.187	12	1
2	2	(United States) Ugo Ugochukwu	Campos Racing	+0.021	11	2
3	5	(United Kingdom) Freddie Slater	Trident	+0.082	10	3
4	11	(Poland) Maciej Gładysz	ART Grand Prix	+0.267	9	4
5	29	(Italy) Nicola Lacorte	DAMS Lucas Oil	+0.346	8	5
6	7	(Argentina) Mattia Colnaghi	MP Motorsport	+0.360	7	6
7	10	(Japan) Taito Kato	ART Grand Prix	+0.425	6	7
8	21	(Australia) James Wharton	Prema Racing	+0.434	5	8
9	18	(Italy) Brando Badoer	Rodin Motorsport	+0.438	4	9
10	4	(Denmark) Noah Strømsted	Trident	+0.451	3	10
11	15	(France) Enzo Deligny	Van Amersfoort Racing	+0.457	2	11
12	16	(Spain) Bruno del Pino	Van Amersfoort Racing	+0.461	1	12
13	20	(New Zealand) Louis Sharp	Prema Racing	+0.499	13	13
14	8	(Finland) Tuukka Taponen	MP Motorsport	+0.554	14	14
15	25	(Japan) Jin Nakamura	Hitech	+0.572	15	15
16	9	(France) Alessandro Giusti	MP Motorsport	+0.630	16	16
17	31	(China) Gerrard Xie	DAMS Lucas Oil	+0.673	17	17
18	24	(Republic of Ireland) Fionn McLaughlin	Hitech	+0.687	18	18
19	17	(Brazil) Pedro Clerot	Rodin Motorsport	+0.692	19	19
20	26	(United States) Brad Benavides	AIX Racing	+0.746	20	20
21	19	(Singapore) Christian Ho	Rodin Motorsport	+0.760	21	21
22	14	(Japan) Hiyu Yamakoshi	Van Amersfoort Racing	+0.768	22	22
23	3	(Australia) Patrick Heuzenroeder	Campos Racing	+0.969	23	23
24	22	(Mexico) José Garfias	Prema Racing	+1.120	24	24
25	27	(Sri Lanka) Yevan David	AIX Racing	+1.544	25	25
26	12	(Japan) Kanato Le	ART Grand Prix	+1.608	26	26
27	23	(South Korea) Michael Shin	Hitech	+1.633	27	27
28	30	(Thailand) Nandhavud Bhirombhakdi	DAMS Lucas Oil	+1.974	28	28
29	28	(Brazil) Fernando Barrichello	AIX Racing	+2.295	29	29
107% time: 1:40.780 (+6.593)
—	6	(Italy) Matteo De Palo	Trident	+27.548	30^{1}	30^{1}

Notes:

- ^1 – Matteo De Palo failed to set a time within the 107%-mark after his fastest lap time was deleted due to him being the sole cause of a red flag during qualifying. He was given permission from the stewards to start both races at the back of the grid.

=== Sprint race ===
The sprint race was held on 7 March 2026, at 11:15 local time (UTC+11). Originally scheduled for 20 laps, the race was red-flagged on lap eight due to James Wharton and Louis Sharp colliding, with the results taken from lap seven. As more than 25% but less than 50% of the scheduled race distance was completed, reduced points were awarded to the top five finishers.

Pos.	No.	Driver	Entrant	Laps	Time/Retired	Grid	Points
1	16	(Spain) Bruno del Pino	Van Amersfoort Racing	7	11:35.440	1	5
2	15	(France) Enzo Deligny	Van Amersfoort Racing	7	+1.381	2	4
3	18	(Italy) Brando Badoer	Rodin Motorsport	7	+2.712	4	3
4	4	(Denmark) Noah Strømsted	Trident	7	+3.307	3	2
5	10	(Japan) Taito Kato	ART Grand Prix	7	+4.734	6	1
6	11	(Poland) Maciej Gładysz	ART Grand Prix	7	+5.857	9	
7	21	(Australia) James Wharton	Prema Racing	7	+7.579	5	
8	2	(United States) Ugo Ugochukwu	Campos Racing	7	+9.562	11	
9	5	(United Kingdom) Freddie Slater	Trident	7	+11.274	10	
10	1	(France) Théophile Naël	Campos Racing	7	+12.789	12	
11	29	(Italy) Nicola Lacorte	DAMS Lucas Oil	7	+13.160	8	
12	8	(Finland) Tuukka Taponen	MP Motorsport	7	+13.675	14	
13	25	(Japan) Jin Nakamura	Hitech	7	+14.282	15	
14	17	(Brazil) Pedro Clerot	Rodin Motorsport	7	+14.693	19	
15	24	(Republic of Ireland) Fionn McLaughlin	Hitech	7	+16.239	18	
16	20	(New Zealand) Louis Sharp	Prema Racing	7	+17.743^{1}	13	
17	26	(United States) Brad Benavides	AIX Racing	7	+18.894	20	
18	19	(Singapore) Christian Ho	Rodin Motorsport	7	+19.404	21	
19	31	(China) Gerrard Xie	DAMS Lucas Oil	7	+20.766	17	
20	14	(Japan) Hiyu Yamakoshi	Van Amersfoort Racing	7	+21.740	22	
21	9	(France) Alessandro Giusti	MP Motorsport	7	+22.296	16	
22	27	(Sri Lanka) Yevan David	AIX Racing	7	+22.620	25	
23	3	(Australia) Patrick Heuzenroeder	Campos Racing	7	+23.040	23	
24	22	(Mexico) José Garfias	Prema Racing	7	+23.413	24	
25	23	(South Korea) Michael Shin	Hitech	7	+23.914	27	
26	6	(Italy) Matteo De Palo	Trident	7	+24.652	30	
27	28	(Brazil) Fernando Barrichello	AIX Racing	7	+25.257	29	
28	12	(Japan) Kanato Le	ART Grand Prix	7	+25.756	26	
29	30	(Thailand) Nandhavud Bhirombhakdi	DAMS Lucas Oil	7	+26.105	28	
30	7	(Argentina) Mattia Colnaghi	MP Motorsport	7	+30.694	7	
Fastest lap: (New Zealand) Louis Sharp (1:37.955 on lap 4)^{2}

Notes:

- ^1 – Louis Sharp received a ten-second time penalty for causing a collision with Prema Racing teammate James Wharton. This demoted him from 8th to 16th.
- ^2 – Louis Sharp set the fastest lap and would have scored the point for it, but later received a ten-second time penalty for causing a collision. This dropped him out of the top ten, making him ineligible to score the point. James Wharton would have scored the point for setting the fastest lap among those finishing in the top ten, but as less than 50% of the scheduled race distance was completed, he was not awarded the point for it.

=== Feature race ===
The feature race was held on 8 March 2026, at 08:50 local time (UTC+11).

Pos.	No.	Driver	Entrant	Laps	Time/Retired	Grid	Points
1	2	(United States) Ugo Ugochukwu	Campos Racing	23	42:59.653	2	25
2	5	(United Kingdom) Freddie Slater	Trident	23	+0.693	3	18
3	10	(Japan) Taito Kato	ART Grand Prix	23	+2.272	7	15
4	16	(Spain) Bruno del Pino	Van Amersfoort Racing	23	+2.716	11	12+1
5	11	(Poland) Maciej Gładysz	ART Grand Prix	23	+3.253	4	10
6	15	(France) Enzo Deligny	Van Amersfoort Racing	23	+3.576	10	8
7	26	(United States) Brad Benavides	AIX Racing	23	+4.716	18	6
8	17	(Brazil) Pedro Clerot	Rodin Motorsport	23	+4.963	17	4
9	25	(Japan) Jin Nakamura	Hitech	23	+5.346	13	2
10	7	(Argentina) Mattia Colnaghi	MP Motorsport	23	+5.784	6	1
11	14	(Japan) Hiyu Yamakoshi	Van Amersfoort Racing	23	+5.983	20	
12	1	(France) Théophile Naël	Campos Racing	23	+6.290^{1}	1	2
13	8	(Finland) Tuukka Taponen	MP Motorsport	23	+6.529	12	
14	24	(Republic of Ireland) Fionn McLaughlin	Hitech	23	+6.802	16	
15	9	(France) Alessandro Giusti	MP Motorsport	23	+7.218	14	
16	18	(Italy) Brando Badoer	Rodin Motorsport	23	+7.778	8	
17	3	(Australia) Patrick Heuzenroeder	Campos Racing	23	+8.483	21	
18	28	(Brazil) Fernando Barrichello	AIX Racing	23	+8.836	27	
19	31	(China) Gerrard Xie	DAMS Lucas Oil	23	+9.401	15	
20	27	(Sri Lanka) Yevan David	AIX Racing	23	+9.977	23	
21	19	(Singapore) Christian Ho	Rodin Motorsport	23	+10.473	19	
22	6	(Italy) Matteo De Palo	Trident	23	+11.182	28	
23	4	(Denmark) Noah Strømsted	Trident	23	+11.621^{2}	9	
24	22	(Mexico) José Garfias	Prema Racing	23	+11.871	22	
25	29	(Italy) Nicola Lacorte	DAMS Lucas Oil	23	+19.142^{3}	5	
DNF	23	(South Korea) Michael Shin	Hitech	19	Suspension	25	
DNF	30	(Thailand) Nandhavud Bhirombhakdi	DAMS Lucas Oil	7	Accident	26	
DNF	12	(Japan) Kanato Le	ART Grand Prix	1		24	
WD	20	(New Zealand) Louis Sharp	Prema Racing	0	Withdrawn^{4}		
WD	21	(Australia) James Wharton	Prema Racing	0	Withdrawn^{4}		
Fastest lap: (Spain) Bruno del Pino (1:37.336 on lap 5)

Notes:

- ^1 – Théophile Naël received a five-second time penalty for a false start.
- ^2 – Noah Strømsted was given a ten-second time penalty for causing a collision with Nicola Lacorte.
- ^3 – Nicola Lacorte was handed a five-second time penalty for a false start. After the race, Lacorte also received a ten-second time penalty for failing to activate the start set-up procedure. This demoted him from 19th to 25th.
- ^4 – After colliding in the sprint race, Prema Racing teammates Louis Sharp and James Wharton both withdrew from the feature race.

== Standings after the event ==
Drivers' Championship standings

Pos.	Driver	Points
1	(United States) Ugo Ugochukwu	25
2	(Spain) Bruno del Pino	18
3	(United Kingdom) Freddie Slater	18
4	(Japan) Taito Kato	16
5	(France) Enzo Deligny	12

Teams' Championship standings

Pos.	Team	Points
1	(Netherlands) Van Amersfoort Racing	30
2	(Spain) Campos Racing	27
3	(France) ART Grand Prix	26
4	(Italy) Trident	20
5	(New Zealand) Rodin Motorsport	7

Note: Only the top five positions are included for both sets of standings.

== See also ==
- 2026 Australian Grand Prix
- 2026 Melbourne Formula 2 round

== Notes ==
Previous round: 2025 Monza Formula 3 round	FIA Formula 2 Championship; 2026 season	Next round: 2026 Monte Carlo Formula 3 round
Previous round: 2025 Melbourne Formula 3 round	Melbourne Formula 3 round	Next round: 2027 Melbourne Formula 3 round
