= Noah Lisle =

Australian racing driver (born 2007)

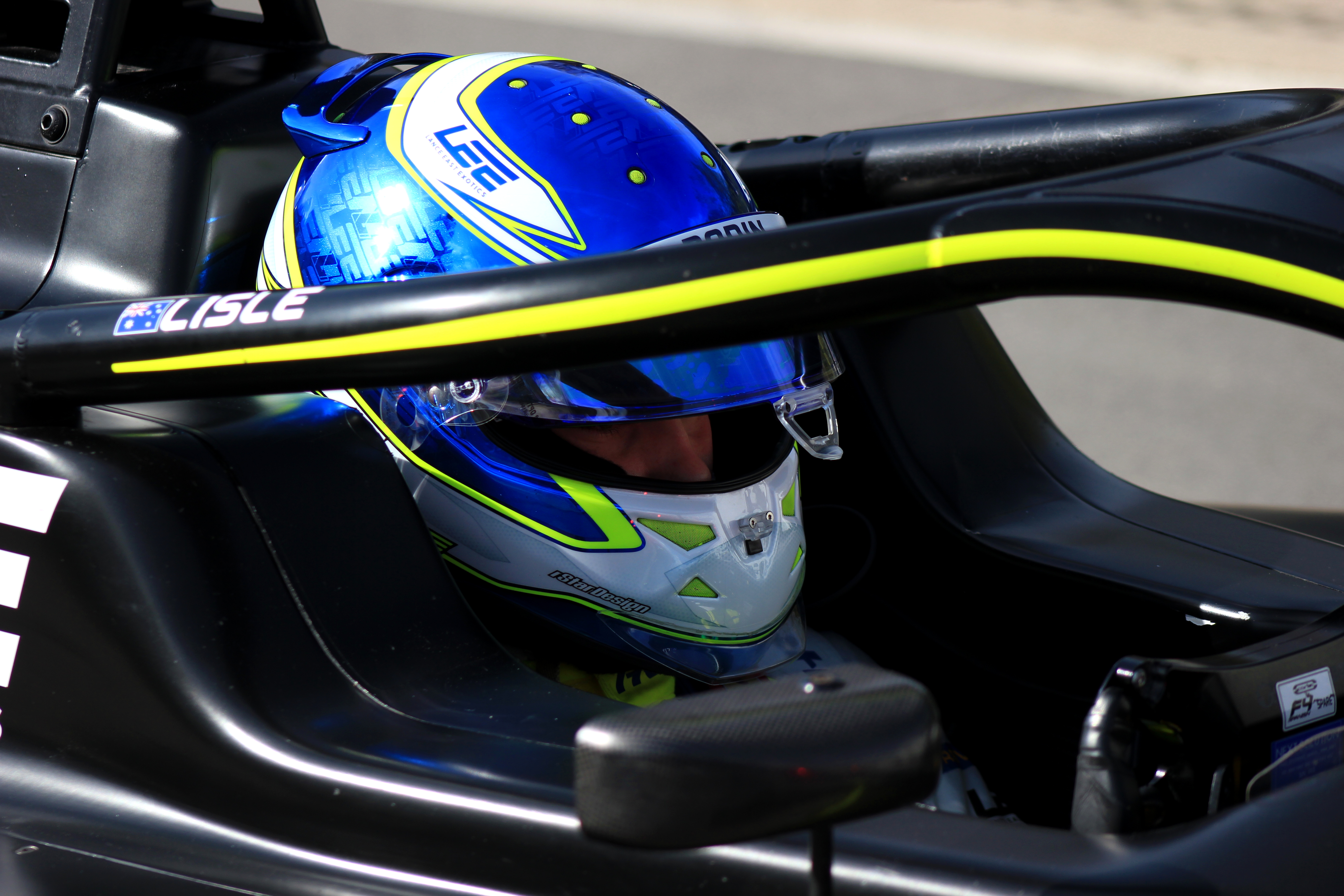
- Lisle in 2023
- Nationality: (Australia) Australian
- Born: Noah Roy Lisle; 2 March 2007 (age 19) Perth, Australia

GB3 career
- Debut season: 2025
- Car number: 6
- Former teams: JHR Developments Hitech
- Starts: 23
- Wins: 0
- Podiums: 4
- Poles: 0
- Fastest laps: 0
- Best finish: 7th in 2025

Previous series
- 2024 2023 2022–2023 2022–2023: Eurocup-3; FR Middle East Championship; Formula 4 UAE; F4 Spanish Championship; F4 British Championship

Noah Roy Lisle (born 2 March 2007) is an Australian racing driver who most recently was set to compete in the GB3 Championship with Hitech. However, he withdrew due to 'personal reasons' prior to season start.

Lisle previously raced in Eurocup-3 in 2024 for Campos Racing, and was a winner in British F4 in 2023.

== Career ==
=== Karting (2018–2021) ===
Lisle made his competitive karting debut in 2018, as he spent the majority of his career karting in the Australian Kart Championship, where he was unable to crack the top-ten in the standings. In 2019, he competed in the IAME Euro Series and the SKUSA SuperNationals, where he would finish 34th in both events.

=== Formula 4 (2022–2023) ===
==== 2022 ====
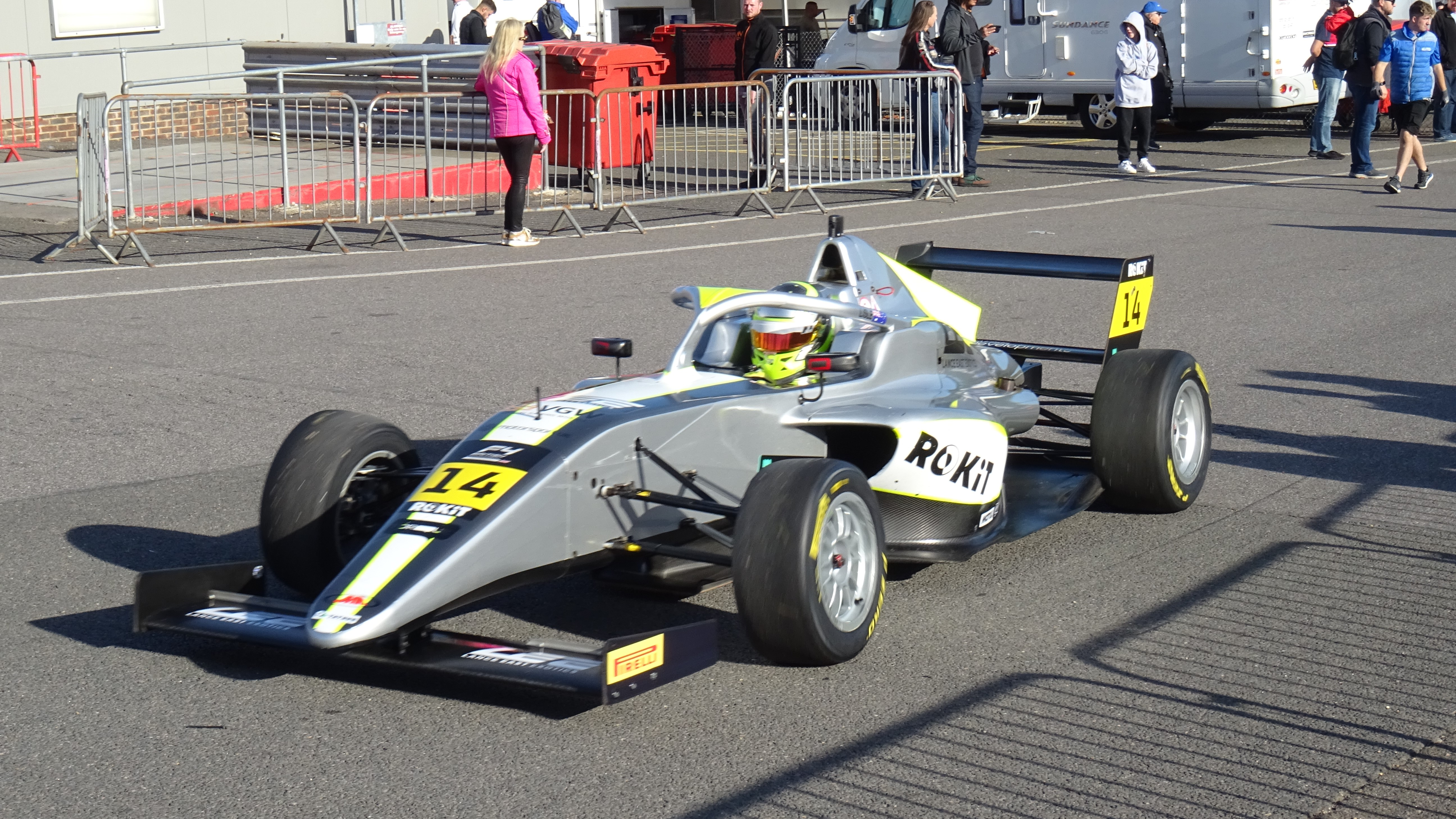
Lisle racing at Brands Hatch during the 2022 F4 British Championship

Lisle made his foray into single-seater in 2022, where he made his debut in the 2022 F4 British Championship for reigning constructors champions JHR Developments. He had an inconsistent season that was highlighted by a third place finish, his maiden single-seater podium at Thruxton, and finished thirteenth in the drivers standings.

Lisle also competed in the 2022 F4 Spanish Championship in the first round for Drivex School. He scored no points, and didn't return to the championship until the fifth and seventh rounds for JHR Developments. Lisle also scored no points with the team and finished the championship in 29th position.

==== 2023 ====
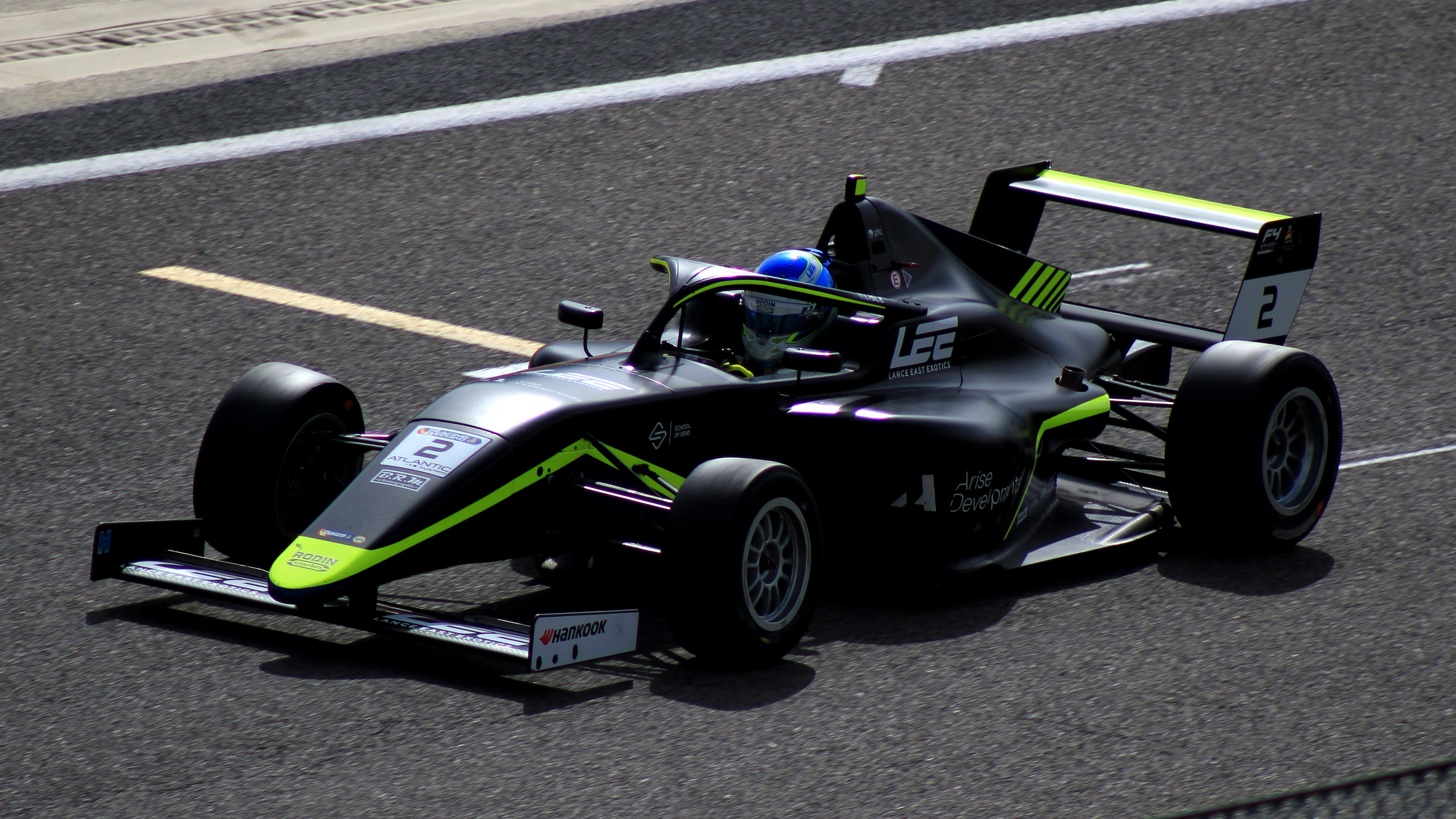
Lisle driving at Spa-Francorchamps during the 2023 F4 Spanish Championship

To kick off his 2023 season, Lisle made his debut in the 2023 Formula 4 UAE Championship for Xcel Motorsport. Lisle only achieved two points finishes, both at the same round at Kuwait Motor Town, a tenth place in the first race and a sole podium in the final race. He ended the championship in nineteenth.

Lisle remained in British F4 for 2023, but switched to Rodin Carlin. His season started with a double pole in Donington Park after Louis Sharp's times were deleted, before taking his first single-seater win during the third race in dominant fashion. After missing the Brands Hatch round, Lisle returned to the podium in Snetterton, before winning once again in Thruxton during the second race. A third and final victory followed in Silverstone, having made a late pass on Deagen Fairclough to steal the win. He finished the season tenth in the standings, with 156 points, three wins and five podiums.

Lisle also competed in a dual campaign in Spanish F4 with Rodin Carlin. With a best finish of fifth and multiple points finishes, he finished 11th in the standings, with 44 points.

=== Formula Regional (2024–present) ===
==== 2024 ====
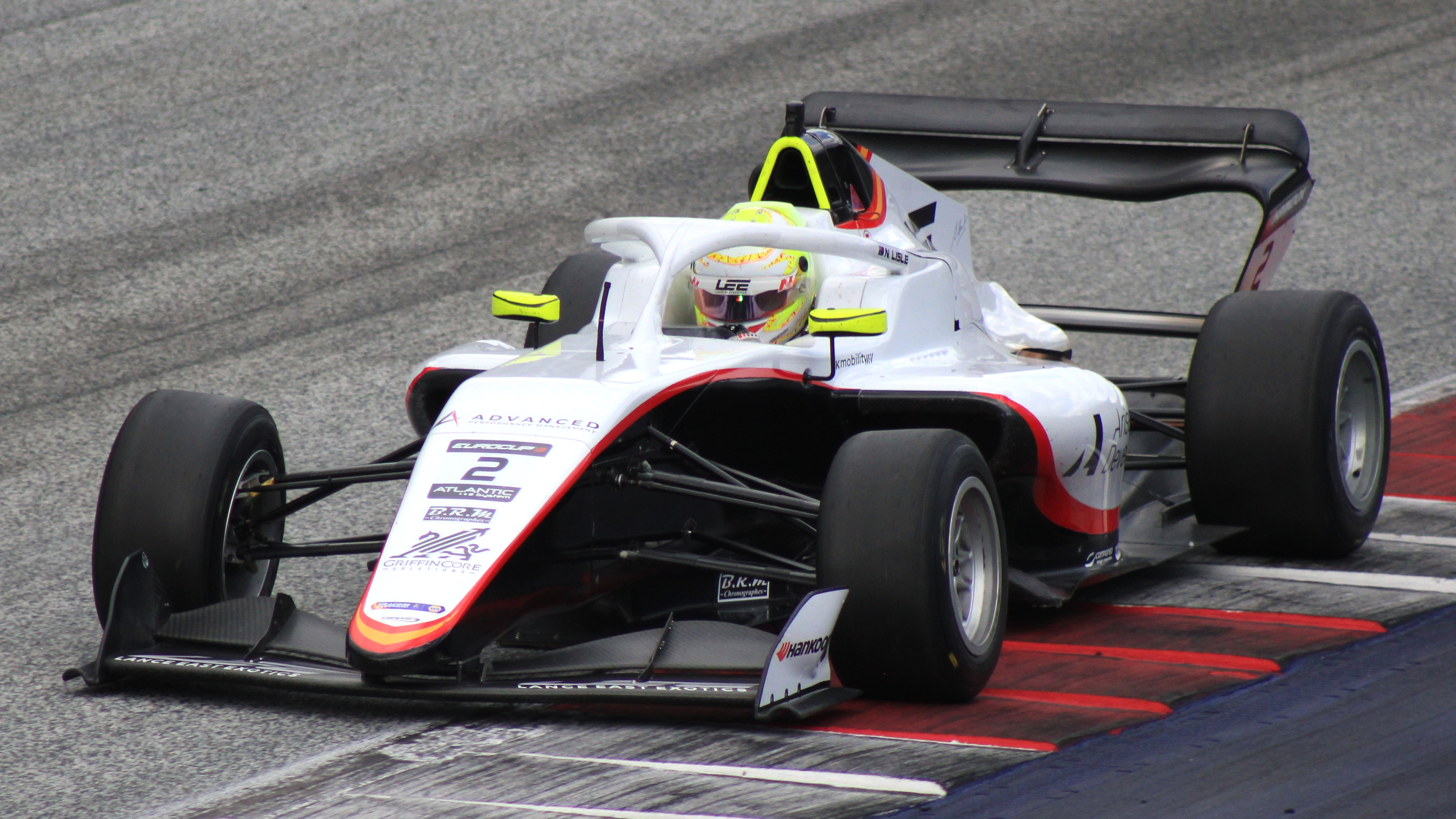
Lisle driving at the Red Bull Ring during the 2024 Eurocup-3 season

During the 2024 off-season, Lisle competed in the Formula Regional Middle East Championship with Xcel Motorsport. He finished in the points twice throughout the season; his highest finish being a seventh place in the third Yas Marina round, placing him 19th in the standings.

For his main campaign, Lisle pivoted to Eurocup-3, partnering Campos Racing. His first points of the season came at the Red Bull Ring, where he earned a fifth place in the first race. With sporadic points finishes throughout the season, including two more fifth places, saw Lisle finish 12th in the standings with 47 points.

==== 2025 ====
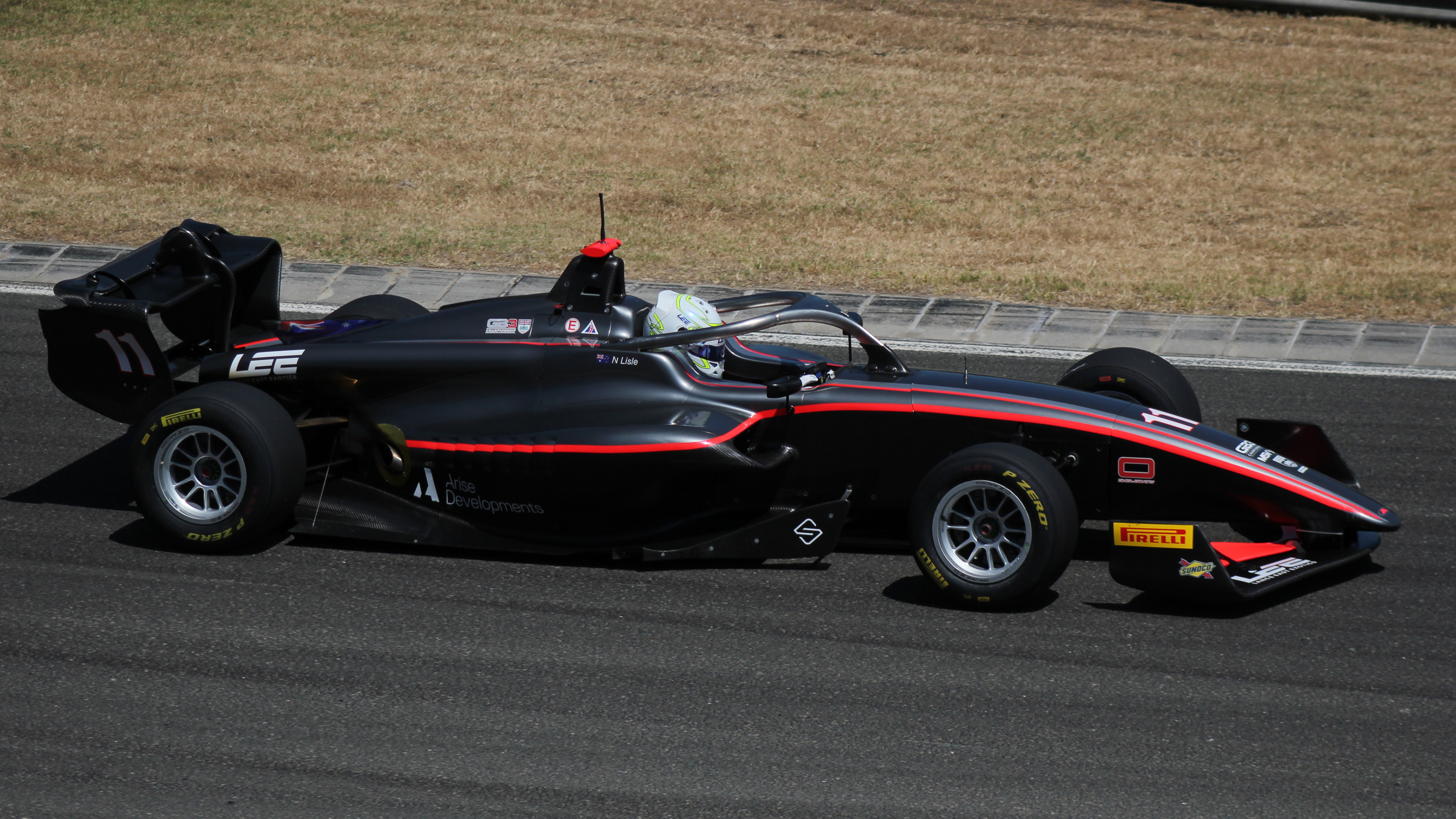
Lisle at the Hungaroring during the 2025 GB3 Championship

Lisle moved to GB3 for 2025, joining JHR Developments. He achieved a double podium at Silverstone on debut, he claimed two more podiums throughout the year in the fifth round at Silverstone and the seventh round at Donington Park. He finished the championship in seventh.

==== 2026 ====
Lisle switched to Hitech for his second GB3 season in 2026. However he withdrew from the championship citing financial reasons from his parents' divorce. In the meantime he worked as a driver's coach. He returned to racing in the 2026 Formula Regional European Championship for CL Motorsport, where he competed in the fifth and sixth rounds. His highest result was a sixteenth, twice, in the sixth round at the Hungaroring.

== Karting record ==
=== Karting career summary ===
| Season | Series | Team | Position |
|---|---|---|---|
| 2018 | Australian Kart Championship - Cadet 12 | | 37th |
| 2019 | Australian Kart Championship - Cadet 12 | Flat Out Karts | 32nd |
| 2019 | SKUSA SuperNationals XXIII - Mini Swift | | 34th |
| 2019 | IAME Euro Series - X30 Junior | Fusion Motorsport | 34th |
| 2020 | Australian Kart Championship - KA4 Junior | | 18th |
| 2021 | Australian Kart Championship - KA4 Junior | | 21st |
| 2021 | Australian Kart Championship - KA2 | | 17th |

== Racing record ==
=== Racing career summary ===
| Season | Series | Team | Races | Wins | Poles | F/Laps | Podiums | Points | Position |
|---|---|---|---|---|---|---|---|---|---|
| 2022 | F4 British Championship | JHR Developments | 30 | 0 | 0 | 0 | 1 | 47 | 13th |
| 2022 | F4 Spanish Championship | Drivex School | 3 | 0 | 0 | 0 | 0 | 0 | 29th |
| 2022 | F4 Spanish Championship | JHR Developments | 6 | 0 | 0 | 0 | 0 | 0 | 29th |
| 2023 | Formula 4 UAE Championship | Xcel Motorsport | 15 | 0 | 0 | 0 | 1 | 16 | 19th |
| 2023 | Formula 4 UAE Championship - Trophy Round | Xcel Motorsport | 2 | 0 | 0 | 0 | 0 | N/A | NC |
| 2023 | F4 British Championship | Rodin Carlin | 27 | 3 | 2 | 4 | 6 | 156 | 10th |
| 2023 | F4 Spanish Championship | Rodin Carlin | 18 | 0 | 0 | 0 | 0 | 44 | 11th |
| 2024 | Formula Regional Middle East Championship | Xcel Motorsport | 15 | 0 | 0 | 0 | 0 | 7 | 19th |
| 2024 | Eurocup-3 | Campos Racing | 16 | 0 | 0 | 0 | 0 | 47 | 12th |
| 2025 | GB3 Championship | JHR Developments | 23 | 0 | 0 | 0 | 4 | 287 | 7th |
| 2026 | GB3 Championship | Hitech TGR | 0 | 0 | 0 | 0 | 0 | 0 | TBD |
| 2026 | Formula Regional European Championship | CL Motorsport | 4 | 0 | 0 | 0 | 0 | 0 | 36th |

* Season still in progress.

=== Complete F4 British Championship results ===
(key) (Races in bold indicate pole position) (Races in italics indicate fastest lap)

| Year | Team | 1 | 2 | 3 | 4 | 5 | 6 | 7 | 8 | 9 | 10 | 11 | 12 | 13 | 14 | 15 | 16 | 17 | 18 | 19 | 20 | 21 | 22 | 23 | 24 | 25 | 26 | 27 | 28 | 29 | 30 | 31 | DC | Points |
|---|---|---|---|---|---|---|---|---|---|---|---|---|---|---|---|---|---|---|---|---|---|---|---|---|---|---|---|---|---|---|---|---|---|---|
| 2022 | JHR Developments | DON; 1; 10 | DON; 2; 11^{1} | DON; 3; 12 | BHI; 1; 9 | BHI; 2 Ret | BHI; 3 Ret | THR1; 1; 11 | THR1; 2; 3 | THR1; 3; 10 | OUL; 1; 11 | OUL; 2; 12 | OUL; 3; 8 | CRO; 1; 13 | CRO; 2; 5^{7} | CRO; 3; 9 | KNO; 1; 10 | KNO; 2; 13 | KNO; 3; 15 | SNE; 1; 11 | SNE; 2; 13 | SNE; 3; 11 | THR2; 1; 12 | THR2; 2 Ret | THR2; 3 Ret | SIL; 1; 6 | SIL; 2 Ret | SIL; 3; 11 | BHGP; 1; 9 | BHGP; 2; 11 | BHGP; 3; 9 | | 13th | 47 |
| 2023 | Rodin Carlin | **DPN**; **1**; 2 | DPN; 2; 17^{4} | **DPN**; **3**; 1 | BHI; 1 | BHI; 2 | BHI; 3 | SNE; 1 C | SNE; 2; 2^{7} | SNE; 3; 20 | THR; 1 Ret | THR; 2; 1^{3} | THR; 3; 16 | OUL; 1; 8 | OUL; 2; 12 | OUL; 3; 8 | SIL; 1; 7 | SIL; 2; 1^{6} | SIL; 3; 10 | CRO; 1; 12 | CRO; 2 Ret | CRO; 3; 9 | KNO; 1; 6 | KNO; 2; 18 | KNO; 3; 12 | DPGP; 1; 16 | DPGP; 2; 13 | DPGP; 3; 3^{10} | DPGP; 4; 7 | BHGP; 1; 7 | BHGP; 2; 15 | BHGP; 3; 14 | 10th | 156 |

=== Complete F4 Spanish Championship results ===
(key) (Races in bold indicate pole position) (Races in italics indicate fastest lap)

| Year | Team | 1 | 2 | 3 | 4 | 5 | 6 | 7 | 8 | 9 | 10 | 11 | 12 | 13 | 14 | 15 | 16 | 17 | 18 | 19 | 20 | 21 | DC | Points |
|---|---|---|---|---|---|---|---|---|---|---|---|---|---|---|---|---|---|---|---|---|---|---|---|---|
| 2022 | Drivex School | ALG; 1; 29 | ALG; 2; 18 | ALG; 3; 20 | JER; 1 | JER; 2 | JER; 3 | CRT; 1 | CRT; 2 | CRT; 3 | SPA; 1 | SPA; 2 | SPA; 3 | | | | | | | | | | 29th | 0 |
| 2022 | JHR Developments | | | | | | | | | | | | | ARA; 1; 13 | ARA; 2; 24 | ARA; 3 Ret | NAV; 1 | NAV; 2 | NAV; 3 | CAT; 1; 16 | CAT; 2 Ret | CAT; 3; 24 | 29th | 0 |
| 2023 | Rodin Carlin | SPA; 1; 6 | SPA; 2; 5 | SPA; 3 Ret | ARA; 1; 13 | ARA; 2; 20 | ARA; 3 Ret | NAV; 1 | NAV; 2 | NAV; 3 | JER; 1; 8 | JER; 2; 6 | JER; 3; 7 | EST; 1; 30 | EST; 2; 24 | EST; 3; 6 | CRT; 1; 9 | CRT; 2; 11 | CRT; 3; 11 | CAT; 1; 9 | CAT; 2; 30† | CAT; 3; 19 | 11th | 44 |

=== Complete Formula 4 UAE Championship results ===
(key) (Races in bold indicate pole position) (Races in italics indicate fastest lap)

| Year | Team | 1 | 2 | 3 | 4 | 5 | 6 | 7 | 8 | 9 | 10 | 11 | 12 | 13 | 14 | 15 | Pos | Points |
|---|---|---|---|---|---|---|---|---|---|---|---|---|---|---|---|---|---|---|
| 2023 | Xcel Motorsport | DUB1; 1; 29 | DUB1; 2; 12 | DUB1; 3; 17 | KMT1; 1; 10 | KMT1; 2; 13 | KMT1; 3; 3 | KMT2; 1; 31 | KMT2; 2; 33† | KMT2; 3; 12 | DUB2; 1; 15 | DUB2; 2; 35† | DUB2; 3; 19 | YMC; 1; 13 | YMC; 2; 23 | YMC; 3; 14 | 19th | 16 |

=== Complete Formula Regional Middle East Championship results ===
(key) (Races in bold indicate pole position) (Races in italics indicate fastest lap)

| Year | Entrant | 1 | 2 | 3 | 4 | 5 | 6 | 7 | 8 | 9 | 10 | 11 | 12 | 13 | 14 | 15 | DC | Points |
|---|---|---|---|---|---|---|---|---|---|---|---|---|---|---|---|---|---|---|
| 2024 | Saintéloc Racing | YMC1; 1; 19 | YMC1; 2; 12 | YMC1; 3; 17 | YMC2; 1; 20 | YMC2; 2; 10 | YMC2; 3; 11 | DUB1; 1; 14 | DUB1; 2; 11 | DUB1; 3; 11 | YMC3; 1; 11 | YMC3; 2; 7 | YMC3; 3; 11 | DUB2; 1; 27 | DUB2; 2; 24 | DUB2; 3; 14 | 19th | 7 |

=== Complete Eurocup-3 results ===
(key) (Races in bold indicate pole position) (Races in italics indicate fastest lap)

| Year | Team | 1 | 2 | 3 | 4 | 5 | 6 | 7 | 8 | 9 | 10 | 11 | 12 | 13 | 14 | 15 | 16 | 17 | DC | Points |
|---|---|---|---|---|---|---|---|---|---|---|---|---|---|---|---|---|---|---|---|---|
| 2024 | Campos Racing | SPA; 1 Ret | SPA; 2 C | RBR; 1; 5 | RBR; 2; 12 | POR; 1; 8 | POR; 2; 15 | POR; 3 Ret | LEC; 1; 21 | LEC; 2; 11 | ZAN; 1; 5 | ZAN; 2; 20 | ARA; 1; 8 | ARA; 2; 5 | JER; 1; 7 | JER; 2; 12 | CAT; 1; 13 | CAT; 2; 17 | 12th | 47 |

=== Complete GB3 Championship results ===
(key) (Races in bold indicate pole position) (Races in italics indicate fastest lap)

| Year | Team | 1 | 2 | 3 | 4 | 5 | 6 | 7 | 8 | 9 | 10 | 11 | 12 | 13 | 14 | 15 | 16 | 17 | 18 | 19 | 20 | 21 | 22 | 23 | 24 | DC | Points |
|---|---|---|---|---|---|---|---|---|---|---|---|---|---|---|---|---|---|---|---|---|---|---|---|---|---|---|---|
| 2025 | JHR Developments | SIL1; 1; 2 | SIL1; 2; 2 | SIL1; 3 Ret | ZAN; 1; 7 | ZAN; 2; 8 | ZAN; 3; 5^{1} | SPA; 1; 4 | SPA; 2; 14 | SPA; 3; 14 | HUN; 1; 8 | HUN; 2; 4 | HUN; 3; 11 | SIL2; 1 Ret | SIL2; 2; 5 | SIL2; 3; 3^{2} | BRH; 1; 10 | BRH; 2; 10 | BRH; 3; 13 | DON; 1; 3 | DON; 2 DNS | DON; 3; 6^{5} | MNZ; 1; 10 | MNZ; 2 Ret | MNZ; 3; 9^{2} | 7th | 287 |

=== Complete Formula Regional European Championship results ===
(key) (Races in bold indicate pole position) (Races in italics indicate fastest lap)

| Year | Team | 1 | 2 | 3 | 4 | 5 | 6 | 7 | 8 | 9 | 10 | 11 | 12 | 13 | 14 | 15 | 16 | 17 | 18 | 19 | 20 | DC | Points |
|---|---|---|---|---|---|---|---|---|---|---|---|---|---|---|---|---|---|---|---|---|---|---|---|
| 2026 | CL Motorsport | RBR; 1 | RBR; 2 | RBR; 3 | ZAN; 1 | ZAN; 2 | SPA; 1 | SPA; 2 | SPA; 3 | MNZ; 1 | MNZ; 2 | MNZ; 3 | HUN; 1; 16 | HUN; 2; 16 | LEC; 1; 25 | LEC; 2; 26 | IMO; 1 | IMO; 2 | IMO; 3 | HOC; 1 | HOC; 2 | 36th | 0 |
