= Douwe Dedecker =

Belgian racing driver (born 2008)

- Dedecker in 2023
- Nationality: (Belgium) Belgian
- Born: 3 January 2008 (age 18) Bree, Belgium
- Categorisation: FIA Silver

Previous series
- 2024 2023: F4 Spanish Championship; F4 British Championship

Douwe Dedecker (born 3 January 2008) is a Belgian racing driver who last competed for EuroInternational in the LMP3 class of the European Le Mans Series.

== Career ==
Dedecker began karting in 2015, competing until 2022. Starting out in Micro karts, Dedecker won the 2017 BNL title, as well as two RMC Grand Finals invitations, in which he most notably finished second in 2018. In parallel, Dedecker also made his debut in mini karts, winning the 2018 IAME Series Benelux title, as well as finishing third in the following year's WSK Euro Series. Moving up to OK-J for the next two and a half seasons, in which he was most notably third in the 2021 Deutsche Kart-Meisterschaft. A mid-season switch to OK in 2022 then took place, in which Dedecker picked up a back injury in the Italian Karting Championship, causing him to leave karting at the end of the year.

In 2023, Dedecker joined Virtuosi Racing to make his single-seater debut in the F4 British Championship. In his only season in the series, Dedecker took a lone podium in the reverse-grid race at Oulton Park en route to 21st in overall points. The following year, Dedecker moved to GRS Team to race for them in the Formula Winter Series and the F4 Spanish Championship. In the former, Dedecker was 16th in overall points with a podium at Valencia, while his Spanish F4 campaign lasted three rounds, in which he took a lone points finish at Algarve, before making a one-off appearance in Eurocup-3 ahead of his departure from the team.

At the end of 2024, Dedecker moved to sportscar competition, joining Inter Europol Competition to race in the LMP3 class of the 2024–25 Asian Le Mans Series. Partnering Daniel Ali and Tim Creswick in the three-round season, Dedecker took a lone podium in race one at Dubai to take eighth in points. For the remainder of 2025, Dedecker drove for the Polish team in the European Le Mans Series alongside Creswick and Reece Gold. In his first ELMS season, Dedecker finished third on debut at Barcelona, before matching his season-best result at Circuit de Spa-Francorchamps as he ended the year third in LMP3.

In 2026, Dedecker switched to EuroInternational for his second ELMS season, as he partnered Max van der Snel and Matthew Richard Bell. In his first season with the team, Dedecker took a podium at Spa, following Rinaldi's post-race disqualification, and four fourth-place finishes to conclude the year sixth in the LMP3 standings.

== Personal life ==
Dedecker has been sponsored by Austrian water treatment company BWT since 2020.

== Karting record ==
=== Karting career summary ===
Season	Series	Team	Position
2016	BNL International Karting Series — Micro		14th
2017	BNL Golden Trophy — Micro Max		1st
2017	RMC Grand Finals — Micro Max	Dominique Dedecker	25th
2018	WSK Champions Cup — 60 Mini	P1 Racing	91st
2018	South Garda Winter Cup — 60 Mini	Zanardi Racing Team	63rd
2018	WSK Super Master Series — 60 Mini	Zanardi Racing Team	105th
2018	IAME Series Benelux — X30 Mini		1st
2018	Italian Karting Championship — 60 Mini		NC
2018	WSK Open Cup — 60 Mini	Zanardi Racing Team	NC
2018	IAME International Final — X30 Mini		26th
2018	WSK Final Cup — 60 Mini	Parolin Motorsport	40th
2018	RMC Grand Finals — Micro Max	GKS Lemmens Power	2nd
2019	WSK Champions Cup — 60 Mini	Parolin Motorsport	NC
2019	WSK Super Master Series — 60 Mini	Parolin Motorsport; Team Driver Racing Kart (Note: Dedecker competed for Parolin Motorsport in rounds 1–2 and for Team Driver Racing Kart in rounds 3–4.)	31st
2019	WSK Euro Series — 60 Mini	Team Driver Racing Kart	3rd
2019	IAME Euro Series — X30 Mini		21st
2019	Italian Karting Championship — 60 Mini		20th
2020	WSK Champions Cup — OK-J	KR Motorsport	33rd
2020	WSK Super Master Series — OK-J	KR Motorsport	30th
2020	South Garda Winter Cup — OK-J	KR Motorsport	45th
2020	WSK Euro Series — OK-J	KR Motorsport	24th
2020	Champions of the Future — OK-J	KR Motorsport	9th
2020	Karting European Championship — OK-J	KR Motorsport	22nd
2020	Deutsche Kart-Meisterschaft — OK-J		
2020	BNL Karting Series — Junior Max		14th
2020	Karting World Championship — OK-J	KR Motorsport	22nd
2020	WSK Open Cup — OK-J	KR Motorsport	28th
2021	WSK Champions Cup — OK-J	KR Motorsport	NC
2021	WSK Super Master Series — OK-J	KR Motorsport	11th
2021	WSK Euro Series — OK-J	KR Motorsport	24th
2021	Champions of the Future — OK-J	KR Motorsport; SP Motorsport (Note: Dedecker competed for KR Motorsport in rounds 1–2 and for SP Motorsport in round 3.)	19th
2021	Deutsche Kart-Meisterschaft — OK-J	TB Racing Team	3rd
2021	Karting European Championship — OK-J	KR Motorsport	12th
2021	WSK Open Cup — OK-J	SP Motorsport	37th
2021	Karting World Championship — OK-J	SP Motorsport	42nd
2021	WSK Final Cup — OK-J	SP Motorsport	NC
2022	WSK Super Master Series — OK-J	KR Motorsport	14th
2022	Champions of the Future Winter Series — OK-J	KR Motorsport	31st
2022	Champions of the Future — OK-J	KR Motorsport; Ricky Flynn Motorsport (Note: Dedecker competed for KR Motorsport in round 1 and for Ricky Flynn Motorsport in round 2.)	50th
2022	Deutsche Kart-Meisterschaft — OK-J	Rehm Racing	
2022	Karting European Championship — OK-J	Ricky Flynn Motorsport	42nd
2022	Champions of the Future — OK	KR Motorsport	29th
2022	Deutsche Kart-Meisterschaft — OK	TB Racing Team	
2022	Karting European Championship — OK	KR Motorsport	89th
2022	WSK Euro Series — OK	KR Motorsport	18th
2022	Karting World Championship — OK	KR Motorsport	77th

== Racing record ==
=== Career summary ===
Season	Series	Team	Races	Wins	Poles	F/Laps	Podiums	Points	Position
2023	F4 British Championship	Virtuosi Racing	30	0	0	0	1	26	21st
2024	Formula Winter Series	GRS Team	11	0	0	0	1	23	16th
2024	F4 Spanish Championship	GRS Team	9	0	0	0	0	1	25th
2024	Eurocup-3	GRS Team	2	0	0	0	0	0	30th
2024–25	Asian Le Mans Series – LMP3	Inter Europol Competition	6	0	0	0	1	55	8th
2025	European Le Mans Series – LMP3	Inter Europol Competition	6	0	0	0	2	66	**3rd**
2026	European Le Mans Series – LMP3	EuroInternational	6	0	0	0	1	63	5th

=== Complete F4 British Championship results ===
(key) (Races in bold indicate pole position; races in italics indicate fastest lap)

Year	Team	1	2	3	4	5	6	7	8	9	10	11	12	13	14	15	16	17	18	19	20	21	22	23	24	25	26	27	28	29	30	31	DC	Points
2023	Virtuosi Racing	DPN; 1; 15	DPN; 2; 18	DPN; 3; 17	BHI; 1; 13	BHI; 2; 19	BHI; 3; 13	SNE; 1 C	SNE; 2; 18	SNE; 3; 17	THR; 1; 18	THR; 2; 7	THR; 3; 15	OUL; 1; 17	OUL; 2; 2^{2}	OUL; 3; 18	SIL; 1; 16	SIL; 2; 6	SIL; 3; 19	CRO; 1; 14	CRO; 2 Ret	CRO; 3; 15	KNO; 1; 14	KNO; 2; 5	KNO; 3; 15	DPGP; 1; 17	DPGP; 2; 15	DPGP; 3; 15	DPGP; 4; 13	BHGP; 1; 16	BHGP; 2; 18	BHGP; 3; 17	21st	26

=== Complete Formula Winter Series results ===
(key) (Races in bold indicate pole position) (Races in italics indicate fastest lap)

Year	Team	1	2	3	4	5	6	7	8	9	10	11	12	DC	Points
2024	GRS Team	JER; 1; 16	JER; 2; 17	JER; 3; 14	CRT; 1; 11	CRT; 2; 15	CRT; 3; 3	ARA; 1; 16	ARA; 2; 11	ARA; 3; 12	BAR; 1 C	BAR; 2; 9	BAR; 3; 7	16th	23

=== Complete F4 Spanish Championship results ===
(key) (Races in bold indicate pole position) (Races in italics indicate fastest lap)

Year	Team	1	2	3	4	5	6	7	8	9	10	11	12	13	14	15	16	17	18	19	20	21	DC	Points
2024	GRS Team	JAR; 1; 24	JAR; 2; 20	JAR; 3; 21	POR; 1; 29	POR; 2; 9	POR; 3; 14	LEC; 1; 20	LEC; 2 Ret	LEC; 3; 18	ARA; 1	ARA; 2	ARA; 3	CRT; 1	CRT; 2	CRT; 3	JER; 1	JER; 2	JER; 3	CAT; 1	CAT; 2	CAT; 3	25th	1

=== Complete Eurocup-3 results ===
(key) (Races in bold indicate pole position) (Races in italics indicate fastest lap)

Year	Team	1	2	3	4	5	6	7	8	9	10	11	12	13	14	15	16	17	DC	Points
2024	GRS Team	SPA; 1	SPA; 2	RBR; 1	RBR; 2	POR; 1	POR; 2	POR; 3	LEC; 1	LEC; 2	ZAN; 1	ZAN; 2	ARA; 1; 15	ARA; 2 Ret	JER; 1 WD	JER; 2 WD	CAT; 1	CAT; 2	30th	0

=== Complete Asian Le Mans Series results ===
(key) (Races in bold indicate pole position) (Races in italics indicate fastest lap)

Year	Team	Class	Car	Engine	1	2	3	4	5	6	DC	Points
2024–25	Inter Europol Competition	LMP3	Ligier JS P320	Nissan VK56DE 5.6L V8	SEP; 1 Ret	SEP; 2; 5	DUB; 1; 3	DUB; 2; 5	ABU; 1; 4	ABU; 2; 6	8th	55

=== Complete European Le Mans Series results ===
(key) (Races in bold indicate pole position; results in italics indicate fastest lap)

Year	Entrant	Class	Chassis	Engine	1	2	3	4	5	6	Rank	Points
2025	Inter Europol Competition	LMP3	Ligier JS P325	Toyota V35A 3.5 L V6	CAT; 3	LEC; 4	IMO; 7	SPA; 3	SIL; 5	ALG; 6	3rd	66
2026	EuroInternational	LMP3	Ligier JS P325	Toyota V35A 3.5 L V6	CAT; 4	LEC; DSQ	IMO; 4	SPA; 3	SIL; 4	ALG; 4	6th	63
