= 2023 F4 British Championship =

The 2023 ROKiT F4 British Championship is a multi-event, Formula 4 open-wheel single seater motor racing championship held across United Kingdom. The championship features a mix of professional motor racing teams and privately funded drivers, competing in Formula 4 cars that conform to the technical regulations for the championship. This, the ninth season, following on from the British Formula Ford Championship, is the ninth year that the cars conform to the FIA's Formula 4 regulations. Part of the TOCA tour, it forms part of the extensive program of support categories built up around the BTCC centrepiece.

The season commenced on 22 April at Donington Park and concluded on 8 October at Brands Hatch, utilising the Grand Prix circuit, after thirty races to be held at ten meetings, all but one in the support of the 2023 British Touring Car Championship.

== Teams and drivers ==
All teams are British-registered.

Team	No.	Drivers	Class	Rounds
Rodin Carlin	2	(Australia) Noah Lisle		1, 3–10
Rodin Carlin	11	(New Zealand) Louis Sharp		All
Rodin Carlin	12	(United Kingdom) Josh Irfan	R	All
Rodin Carlin	55	(India) Dion Gowda		All
Hitech Pulse-Eight	4	(Australia) James Piszcyk		All
Hitech Pulse-Eight	5	(United Kingdom) William Macintyre		All
Hitech Pulse-Eight	6	(Japan) Kanato Le		All
Hitech Pulse-Eight	7	(United Kingdom) Gabriel Stilp	R	All
Virtuosi Racing	8	(India) Kai Daryanani		All
Virtuosi Racing	14	(South Africa) Aqil Alibhai		All
Virtuosi Racing	28	(Belgium) Douwe Dedecker	R	All
Phinsys by Argenti	15	(Italy) Alvise Rodella		9
Phinsys by Argenti	17	(Australia) Patrick Heuzenroeder		All
Phinsys by Argenti	26	(United Kingdom) Isaac Barashi (Note: Barashi is a British-Israeli-Portuguese driver competing under a British licence.)	R	All
Phinsys by Argenti	53	(Italy) Matteo De Palo	R	3–4
Phinsys by Argenti	72	(United Kingdom) Sonny Smith		1
Phinsys by Argenti	77	(India) Jaden Pariat		1–6
Phinsys by Argenti	88	(Australia) Griffin Peebles		8–9
Fortec Motorsport	18	(United Kingdom) James Higgins		All
Fortec Motorsport	29	(South Africa) Mika Abrahams		4–10
Fortec Motorsport	57	(United Kingdom) Aiden Neate		1–6
JHR Developments	21	(United Kingdom) Tom Mills		9
JHR Developments	72	(United Kingdom) Sonny Smith		2–7
JHR Developments	87	(United Kingdom) Deagen Fairclough		All
Chris Dittmann Racing	23	(Sweden) Gustav Jonsson	R	All
Chris Dittmann Racing	49	(United Kingdom) Daniel Guinchard		1–6
Chris Dittmann Racing	78	(United Kingdom) Jack Sherwood		All
Double R Racing	27	(United Kingdom) Freddie Slater		9–10

Icon	Class
R	Rookie

- Monica Boulton Ramos was set to compete in the championship as the female winner of the ROKiT Racing Stars but did not participate in any rounds.

== Race calendar ==
The provisional calendar was announced on 31 May 2022, with the revision published on 26 October 2022. All races will be held in the United Kingdom. All rounds are scheduled to support 2023 British Touring Car Championship, except for the round at Silverstone Circuit held together with British Endurance Championship.

Round		Circuit	Date	Pole position	Fastest lap	Winning driver	Winning team	Rookie winner
1	R1	Donington Park (National Circuit, Leicestershire)	22 April	(Australia) Noah Lisle (Note: Sharp set the best overall and the best second fastest time in the qualifying session, but his best lap was disallowed as he completed it under red flag. Lisle inherited pole for Race 1 and 3.)	(Australia) Noah Lisle	(New Zealand) Louis Sharp	Rodin Carlin	(United Kingdom) Josh Irfan
1	R2	Donington Park (National Circuit, Leicestershire)	23 April		(New Zealand) Louis Sharp	(New Zealand) Louis Sharp	Rodin Carlin	(United Kingdom) Josh Irfan
1	R3	Donington Park (National Circuit, Leicestershire)	23 April	(Australia) Noah Lisle	(Australia) Noah Lisle	(Australia) Noah Lisle	Rodin Carlin	(United Kingdom) Gabriel Stilp
2	R4	Brands Hatch (Indy Circuit, Kent)	6 May	(United Kingdom) James Higgins	(United Kingdom) Deagen Fairclough	(Japan) Kanato Le	Hitech Pulse-Eight	(Sweden) Gustav Jonsson
2	R5	Brands Hatch (Indy Circuit, Kent)	7 May		(United Kingdom) Deagen Fairclough	(India) Dion Gowda (Note: Fairclough finished first but received a 2 positions drop penalty for gaining an unfair advantage. Gowda inherited the win.)	Rodin Carlin	(United Kingdom) Gabriel Stilp
2	R6	Brands Hatch (Indy Circuit, Kent)	7 May	(United Kingdom) James Higgins	(United Kingdom) Daniel Guinchard	(United Kingdom) James Higgins	Fortec Motorsport	(Sweden) Gustav Jonsson
3	R7	Snetterton Motor Racing Circuit (300 Circuit, Norfolk)	20 May	(India) Dion Gowda	race declared null and void, rescheduled to 26–27 August			
3	R8	Snetterton Motor Racing Circuit (300 Circuit, Norfolk)	21 May		(Australia) Noah Lisle	(South Africa) Aqil Alibhai	Virtuosi Racing	(Sweden) Gustav Jonsson
3	R9	Snetterton Motor Racing Circuit (300 Circuit, Norfolk)	21 May	(India) Dion Gowda	(Australia) Noah Lisle	(India) Dion Gowda	Rodin Carlin	(United Kingdom) Gabriel Stilp
4	R10	Thruxton Circuit (Hampshire)	3 June	(Australia) James Piszcyk	(Australia) James Piszcyk	(Australia) James Piszcyk	Hitech Pulse-Eight	(United Kingdom) Gabriel Stilp
4	R11	Thruxton Circuit (Hampshire)	4 June		(India) Dion Gowda	(Australia) Noah Lisle	Rodin Carlin	(Sweden) Gustav Jonsson
4	R12	Thruxton Circuit (Hampshire)	4 June	(United Kingdom) William Macintyre	(United Kingdom) Deagen Fairclough	(United Kingdom) William Macintyre	Hitech Pulse-Eight	(United Kingdom) Gabriel Stilp
5	R13	Oulton Park (Island Circuit, Cheshire)	17 June	(United Kingdom) James Higgins	(Japan) Kanato Le	(Japan) Kanato Le	Hitech Pulse-Eight	(Sweden) Gustav Jonsson
5	R14	Oulton Park (Island Circuit, Cheshire)	18 June		(New Zealand) Louis Sharp	(United Kingdom) Sonny Smith	JHR Developments	(Belgium) Douwe Dedecker
5	R15	Oulton Park (Island Circuit, Cheshire)	18 June	(United Kingdom) James Higgins	(Japan) Kanato Le	(United Kingdom) James Higgins	Fortec Motorsport	(United Kingdom) Gabriel Stilp
6	R16	Silverstone Circuit (Grand Prix Circuit, Northamptonshire)	24 June	(United Kingdom) William Macintyre	(United Kingdom) Gabriel Stilp	(United Kingdom) Josh Irfan	Rodin Carlin	(United Kingdom) Josh Irfan
6	R17	Silverstone Circuit (Grand Prix Circuit, Northamptonshire)	25 June		(Japan) Kanato Le	(Australia) Noah Lisle	Rodin Carlin	(Sweden) Gustav Jonsson
6	R18	Silverstone Circuit (Grand Prix Circuit, Northamptonshire)	25 June	(Australia) James Piszcyk	(Japan) Kanato Le	(Australia) James Piszcyk	Hitech Pulse-Eight	(United Kingdom) Gabriel Stilp
7	R19	Croft Circuit (North Yorkshire)	29 July	(New Zealand) Louis Sharp	(New Zealand) Louis Sharp	(New Zealand) Louis Sharp	Rodin Carlin	(United Kingdom) Josh Irfan
7	R20	Croft Circuit (North Yorkshire)	29 July		(United Kingdom) Gabriel Stilp	(United Kingdom) Sonny Smith	JHR Developments	(United Kingdom) Gabriel Stilp
7	R21	Croft Circuit (North Yorkshire)	30 July	(New Zealand) Louis Sharp	(New Zealand) Louis Sharp	(New Zealand) Louis Sharp	Rodin Carlin	(United Kingdom) Josh Irfan
8	R22	Knockhill Racing Circuit (Fife)	12 August	(United Kingdom) William Macintyre	(United Kingdom) William Macintyre	(United Kingdom) William Macintyre	Hitech Pulse-Eight	(Sweden) Gustav Jonsson
8	R23	Knockhill Racing Circuit (Fife)	13 August		(United Kingdom) William Macintyre	(United Kingdom) Deagen Fairclough	JHR Developments	(United Kingdom) Gabriel Stilp
8	R24	Knockhill Racing Circuit (Fife)	13 August	(India) Dion Gowda	(Australia) James Piszcyk	(India) Dion Gowda	Rodin Carlin	(Sweden) Gustav Jonsson
9	R25	Donington Park (Grand Prix Circuit, Leicestershire)	26 August	(South Africa) Mika Abrahams	(South Africa) Mika Abrahams	(New Zealand) Louis Sharp	Rodin Carlin	(Sweden) Gustav Jonsson
9	R7	Donington Park (Grand Prix Circuit, Leicestershire)	26 August	(India) Dion Gowda	(Sweden) Gustav Jonsson	(India) Dion Gowda	Rodin Carlin	(Sweden) Gustav Jonsson
9	R26	Donington Park (Grand Prix Circuit, Leicestershire)	27 August		(United Kingdom) William Macintyre	(United Kingdom) Deagen Fairclough	JHR Developments	(United Kingdom) Gabriel Stilp
9	R27	Donington Park (Grand Prix Circuit, Leicestershire)	27 August	(South Africa) Mika Abrahams	(United Kingdom) Freddie Slater	(United Kingdom) Gabriel Stilp	Hitech Pulse-Eight	(United Kingdom) Gabriel Stilp
10	R28	Brands Hatch (Grand Prix Circuit, Kent)	7 October	(New Zealand) Louis Sharp	(United Kingdom) Deagen Fairclough	(New Zealand) Louis Sharp	Rodin Carlin	(Sweden) Gustav Jonsson
10	R29	Brands Hatch (Grand Prix Circuit, Kent)	8 October		(United Kingdom) Deagen Fairclough	(United Kingdom) Josh Irfan	Rodin Carlin	(United Kingdom) Josh Irfan
10	R30	Brands Hatch (Grand Prix Circuit, Kent)	8 October	(New Zealand) Louis Sharp	(United Kingdom) Deagen Fairclough	(United Kingdom) Deagen Fairclough	JHR Developments	(United Kingdom) Gabriel Stilp

== Championship standings ==
Points are awarded to the top ten classified finishers in races 1 and 3 and for the top eight classified finishers in race 2. Up to ten points are awarded for positions gained from the drivers' respective starting positions in race 2 which has its grid formed by reversing the order from the qualifying session. Two points are awarded for the best legal lap set in the qualifying session. Bonus points count towards only the drivers' standings.

Races	Position, points per race										
Races	**1st**	**2nd**	**3rd**	**4th**	**5th**	**6th**	**7th**	**8th**	**9th**	**10th**	**FL**
Qualifying	2										
Races 1 & 3	25	18	15	12	10	8	6	4	2	1	1
Race 2	15	12	10	8	6	4	2	1			1

=== Drivers' standings ===
Pos	Driver	DPN			BHI			SNE			THR			OUL			SIL			CRO			KNO			DPGP				BHGP			Pen.	Pts
1	(New Zealand) Louis Sharp	1	1^{10}	6	Ret	4^{3}	4	C	13^{6}	3	3	12^{7}	3	4	19	6	12	3^{7}	9	**1**	16^{3}	**1**	2	15^{1}	7	1	3	6^{10}	3	**1**	11^{8}	**2**		384
2	(United Kingdom) William Macintyre	6	20	5	2	13^{3}	2	C	6^{10}	4	2	11^{10}	**1**	14	13^{3}	3	**2**	5^{10}	2	3	15^{2}	2	**1**	17	2	9	6	2^{7}	4	3	7^{9}	3		371
3	(United Kingdom) Deagen Fairclough	5	10^{4}	4	4	3^{1}	17	C	17	8	15	4^{10}	6	3	8^{6}	4	6	2^{10}	4	5	7^{8}	3	7	1^{1}	10	12	4	1^{7}	8	2	6^{10}	1	18	296
4	(India) Dion Gowda	4	8^{10}	2	9	1^{1}	10	**C**	10^{10}	**1**	7	3^{8}	Ret	5	18^{2}	5	11	5^{10}	5	6	9^{5}	4	13	Ret	**1**	Ret	**1**	9^{5}	17	EX	12^{3}	9	27	226
5	(Australia) James Piszcyk	10	14	18	7	10^{1}	6	C	5^{10}	5	**1**	15^{5}	5	10	7^{3}	15	3	10^{10}	**1**	8	5^{4}	8	10	3^{2}	18	7	10	12^{4}	6	4	10^{4}	4		220
6	(United Kingdom) James Higgins	8	6^{10}	8	**3**	12^{5}	**1**	C	14	9	10	17	Ret	**15**	16^{6}	**1**	4	11^{6}	8	2	12^{6}	Ret	Ret	2^{1}	11	5	2	11^{6}	5	10	5^{2}	13		217
7	(Japan) Kanato Le	9	4^{7}	16	1	11^{4}	8	C	12^{8}	2	6	5^{10}	21	1	14^{7}	20	15	17	6	9	14	6	15	10^{4}	3	8	8	13	9	5	8^{1}	12		195
8	(South Africa) Aqil Alibhai	Ret	5^{10}	NC	6	6^{3}	Ret	C	1^{6}	10	8	Ret	7	2	10^{5}	7	14	9^{4}	12	15	8	10	4	11^{2}	5	10	12	5^{10}	2	13	13^{4}	6		169
9	(United Kingdom) Gabriel Stilp	17	15	9	Ret	5^{3}	9	C	9^{9}	14	5	20^{2}	4	Ret	15^{3}	9	20	15^{5}	3	11	2^{4}	14	8	4^{5}	14	6	14	7^{10}	1	17	9^{3}	5		164
10	(Australia) Noah Lisle	**2**	17^{4}	**1**				C	2^{7}	20	Ret	1^{3}	16	8	12	8	7	1^{6}	10	12	Ret	9	6	18	12	16	13	3^{10}	7	7	15	14	12	156
11	(Sweden) Gustav Jonsson	Ret	12	10	10	9^{3}	7	C	8^{10}	16	16	2^{5}	10	12	5^{3}	11	8	4^{10}	7	10	10	7	5	16	6	3	5	Ret	14	8	14	10		133
12	(United Kingdom) Josh Irfan	7	7	13	Ret	15^{4}	14	C	Ret	Ret	11	8^{1}	13	19	3^{2}	13	1	13^{2}	11	4	11^{5}	5	12	7^{1}	17	15	7	Ret	Ret	12	1^{1}	16		105
13	(United Kingdom) Daniel Guinchard	3	16^{2}	Ret	5	7^{7}	3	C	Ret	12	21	14^{3}	8	6	17	2	5	12	15															95
14	(United Kingdom) Aiden Neate	11	2^{10}	11	8	2	12	C	7^{5}	6	4	13^{8}	2	Ret	Ret	DNS	WD	WD	WD															91
15	(United Kingdom) Jack Sherwood	13	11^{2}	3	16	16	Ret	C	15	11	17	6	14	11	4^{3}	12	13	Ret	16	Ret	4^{1}	11	3	6^{6}	8	13	9	19	18	9	2^{3}	18		89
16	(United Kingdom) Sonny Smith	18	13	14	Ret	14^{6}	Ret	C	4^{6}	7	9	9^{4}	11	16	1^{5}	19	19	19	Ret	17	1^{2}	12												69
17	(United Kingdom) Freddie Slater																									4		4^{10}	15	14	4^{7}	7		52
18	(South Africa) Mika Abrahams										12	18	9	9	9^{2}	10	10	16	13	7	13	Ret	9	14	12	**2**		17^{5}	**19**	11	Ret	8		46
19	(Australia) Patrick Heuzenroeder	14	9	7	11	18	11	C	3^{3}	13	Ret	Ret	17	7	6^{3}	Ret	9	8^{1}	14	13	17	Ret	Ret	9	9	Ret	11	Ret	16	6	17	11	9	37
20	(United Kingdom) Isaac Barashi	DNS	Ret	15	15	Ret	15	C	19	18	19	Ret	18	Ret	Ret	16	Ret	14	20	18	3	13	Ret	12^{7}	16	Ret	17	18	10	15	3	15		28
21	(Belgium) Douwe Dedecker	15	18	17	13	19	13	C	18	17	18	7	15	17	2^{2}	18	16	6	19	14	Ret	15	14	5	15	17	15	15	13	16	18	17		26
22	(Australia) Griffin Peebles																						Ret	13^{2}	4	14		10^{1}	12					15
23	(India) Jaden Pariat	12	3^{1}	12	12	8^{5}	5	C	WD	WD	20	16	20	18	20	17	18	Ret	17														12	15
24	(India) Kai Daryanani	16	19	Ret	14	17	16	C	16	15	14	10^{2}	19	13	11	14	17	18	18	16	6	16	11	8	19	18	16	8	DNS	Ret	16	19		8
25	(Italy) Matteo De Palo							C	11	19	13	19	12																					0
26	(United Kingdom) Tom Mills																									11		14	11					0
27	(Italy) Alvise Rodella																									Ret		16	Ret					0
Pos	Driver	DPN			BHI			SNE			THR			OUL			SIL			CRO			KNO			DPGP				BHGP			Pen.	Pts

Colour	Result
Gold	Winner
Silver	Second place
Bronze	Third place
Green	Points classification
Blue	Non-points classification
Blue	Non-classified finish (NC)
Purple	Retired, not classified (Ret)
Red	Did not qualify (DNQ)
Red	Did not pre-qualify (DNPQ)
Black	Disqualified (DSQ)
White	Did not start (DNS)
White	Withdrew (WD)
White	Race cancelled (C)
Blank	Did not practice (DNP)
Blank	Did not arrive (DNA)
Blank	Excluded (EX)

**Bold** – Pole
Italics – Fastest Lap
^{x} – Points for positions gained

=== Rookie Cup ===
Pos	Driver	DPN			BHI			SNE			THR			OUL			SIL			CRO			KNO			DPGP				BHGP			Pen.	Pts
1	(Sweden) Gustav Jonsson	Ret	12	10	10	9	7	C	8	16	16	2	10	12	5	11	8	4	7	10	10	7	5	16	5	3	5	Ret	14	8	14	10		489
2	(United Kingdom) Gabriel Stilp	18	15	9	Ret	5	9	C	9	14	5	20	4	Ret	15	9	20	15	3	11	2	14	8	4	14	6	14	7	1	17	9	5		463
3	(United Kingdom) Josh Irfan	7	7	13	Ret	15	14	C	Ret	Ret	11	8	13	19	3	13	1	13	11	4	11	5	12	7	17	15	7	Ret	Ret	12	1	16		380
4	(Belgium) Douwe Dedecker	15	18	17	13	19	13	C	18	17	18	7	15	17	2	18	16	6	19	14	Ret	15	14	5	15	17	15	15	13	16	18	17		354
5	(United Kingdom) Isaac Barashi	DNS	Ret	15	15	Ret	15	C	19	18	19	Ret	18	Ret	Ret	16	Ret	14	20	18	3	13	Ret	12	16	Ret	17	18	10	15	3	15		238
6	(Italy) Matteo De Palo							C	11	19	13	19	12																					58
Pos	Driver	DPN			BHI			SNE			THR			OUL			SIL			CRO			KNO			DPGP				BHGP			Pen.	Pts

=== Teams Cup ===
Pos	Team	Pts
1	Rodin Carlin	692
2	Hitech Pulse-Eight	652
3	JHR Developments	323
4	Fortec Motorsport	313
5	Chris Dittmann Racing	286
6	Virtuosi Racing	181
7	Phinsys by Argenti	117
8	Double R Racing	36
