= Louis Sharp =

New Zealand and British racing driver (born 2007)

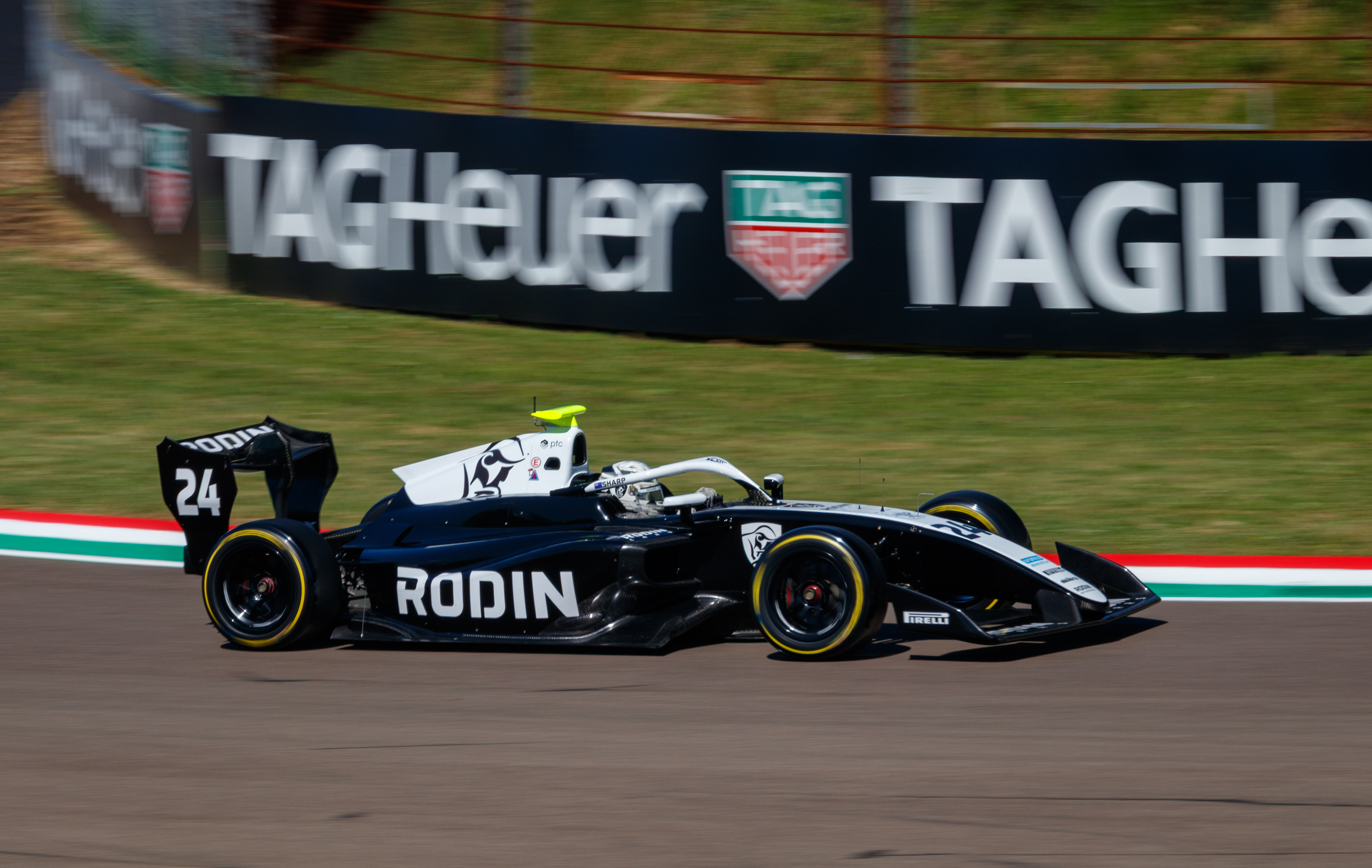
- Sharp in 2025
- Nationality: (New Zealand) New Zealander
- Born: 11 May 2007 (age 19) Nottingham, Nottinghamshire, England

FIA Formula 3 Championship career
- Debut season: 2025
- Car number: 20
- Former teams: Rodin Motorsport, Prema Racing
- Starts: 32 (33 entries)
- Wins: 0
- Podiums: 0
- Poles: 0
- Fastest laps: 2
- Best finish: 21st in 2026

Previous series
- 2026; 2024; 2022–2023; 2022; 2021–22; 2020–21; 2020: FR Oceania; GB3; F4 British; F4 UAE; Yokohama SI F1600 Series; NZ Formula First Championship; Formula First Manfeild Winter Series

Championship titles
- 2026 2024 2023: Tasman Series; GB3 Championship; Formula 4 British Championship
- Statistics up to date as of 15 September 2026.

Louis Sharp (born 11 May 2007) is a New Zealand and British racing driver who last competed in the FIA Formula 3 Championship for Prema Racing.

Sharp was the winner of the 2024 GB3 Championship and the 2023 F4 British Championship for Rodin Carlin. He was also a finalist of the 2024 Autosport BRDC Award.

== Personal life ==
Sharp was born in Nottingham, United Kingdom, living in Newark for his first few early years but spent most of his childhood in Christchurch, New Zealand, where he attended St Bede's College. He later moved back to the UK to compete in the F4 British Championship.

== Career ==
=== Karting (2014–2019) ===
After happening across a local karting track, Sharp's interest was piqued and he started karting at the age of six in 2014, driving in the Kartsport NZ National Schools Championship. He finished 18th in the Cadet class, the next year he finished third in the same class. Two years later, Sharp won the championship in the same class, along with the Sievwright Kartsport NZ National Sprint Championship, in the Cadet class. In 2018, he finished as runner up in the Kartsport NZ National Sprint Championship in the Mini ROK class and the following year he won the championship.

These results caught the attention of David Dicker, founder of the New Zealand based racing car manufacturer Rodin Cars. Dicker, through Rodin, continues to back Sharp through his formula racing career.

=== Lower formulae (2020–2021) ===
==== 2020 ====
Sharp stepped up into single-seater racing in 2020, making his debut in the Formula First Manfeild Winter Series. He won one race and achieved six podiums, finishing the championship in fifth with 375 points. He also completed in the New Zealand Formula First Championship for Track Tec Racing, finishing the championship in fifth and ending his campaign with one podium.

==== 2021 ====
The following year, Sharp drove in the Yokohama South Island Formula Ford Series, getting five wins, ten podiums and two pole positions. finishing fifth in the championship. Sharp was leading the championship before being called up by Carlin to compete in British F4.

=== Formula 4 (2022–2023) ===
==== 2022 ====
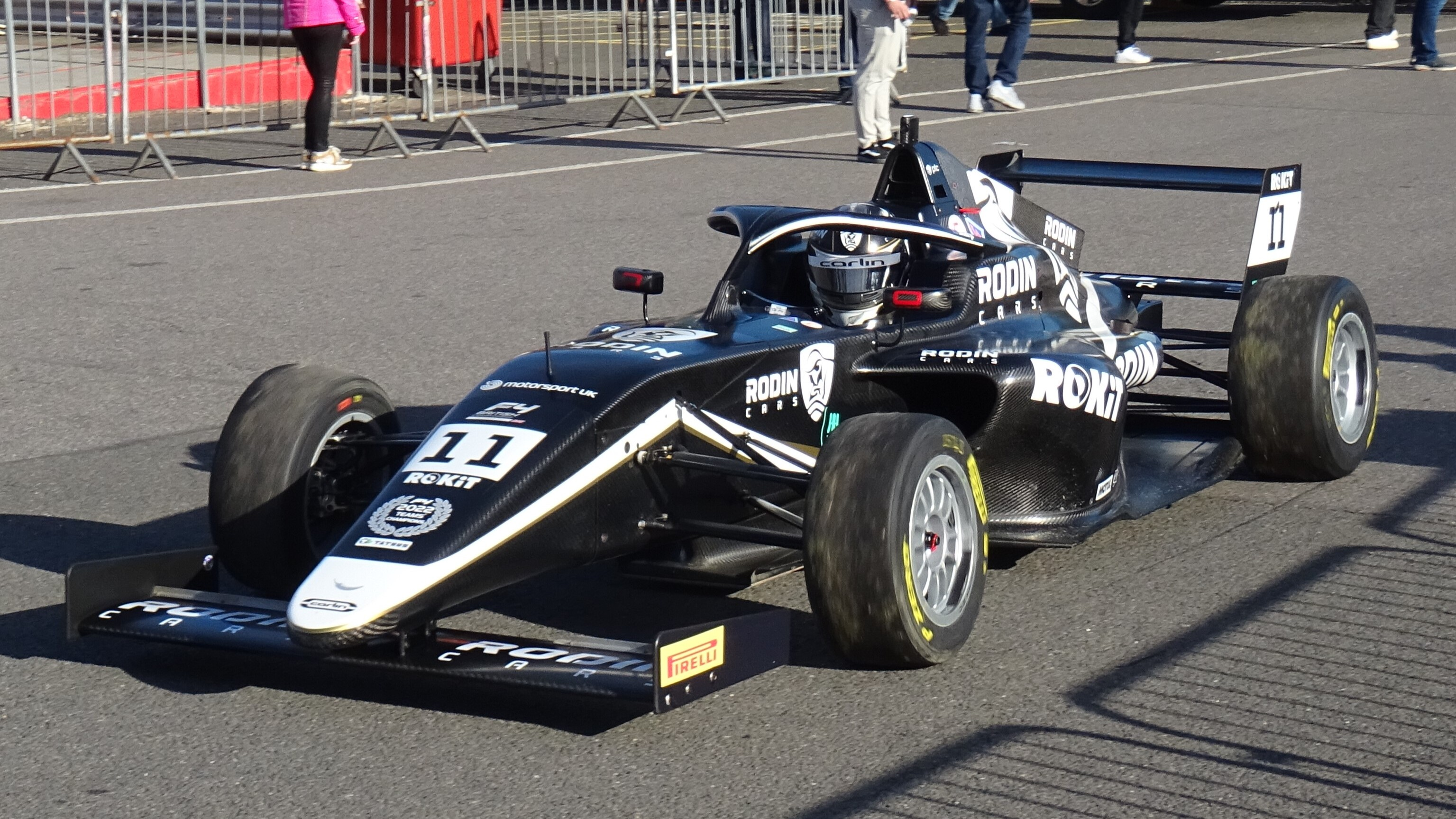
Sharp racing at Brands Hatch during the 2022 F4 British Championship

Sharp made another step up to the 2022 F4 British Championship with Carlin, partnering McLaren Junior Driver Ugo Ugochukwu and Williams Junior Driver Oliver Gray. Sharp did not participate in the first round of the season at Donington Park due to still being 14 years old, with the age limit of most Formula 4 series being set at 15. In his first two rounds he got two podiums; third place in the third race at both Brands Hatch and Thruxton. He got podiums in all three races at Round 4, Oulton Park, taking his first win in the series in the third race. He took another podium with second place during the third race in Croft. He was on a consistent points streak in Knockhill and Snetterton until making contact with Aiden Neate during the third race at Snetterton, while fighting for a top ten position. Sharp added two more third places in the first and third races at Thruxton. In Silverstone, Sharp got his second win of the season in the first race, after original race winner Gray was penalised. Sharp came third in the reverse-grid race, but stalled on the grid and consequently retired from the third race. The first race in the final round at Brands Hatch did not go well for Sharp, as he retired after his car caught fire. He rounded out the remaining races with two podium finishes. Sharp narrowly piped Joseph Loake to fourth in the championship standings with 272 points.

==== 2023 ====
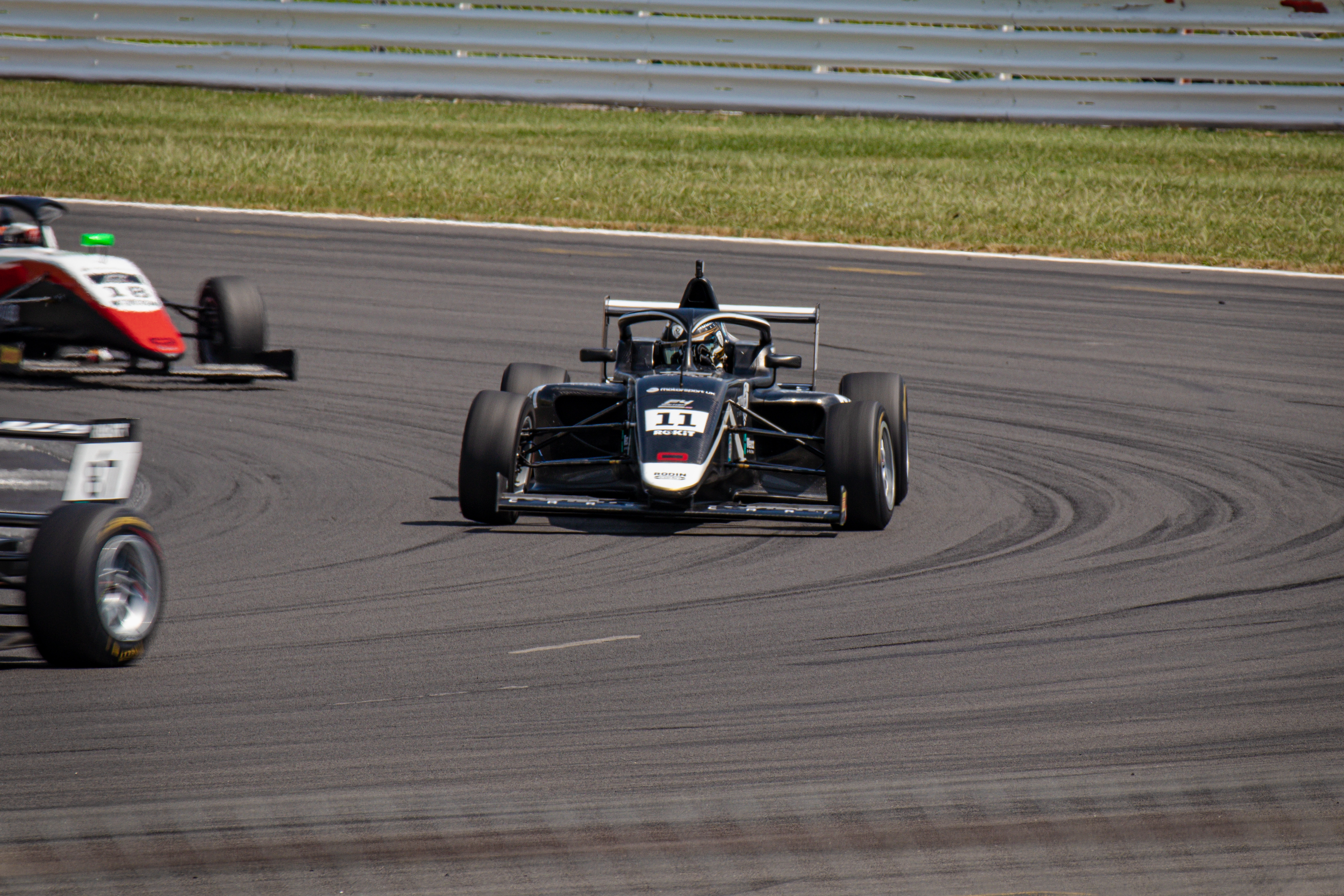
Sharp driving at Silverstone during the 2023 F4 British Championship

Sharp made his debut in the 2023 Formula 4 UAE Championship for the Trophy Rounds only, which took place in late 2022 and served as a support race for the 2022 Abu Dhabi Grand Prix. Sharp drove with Carlin and won both races in an 11 car grid.

Sharp returned to the F4 British Championship in 2023, rejoining the newly rebranded Rodin Carlin team in hopes of winning the title, and was teammates with Australian Noah Lisle and Brit Josh Irfan. Sharp started the season by taking victory in the first two races in the opening round in Donington Park. Following a pair of fourth places in Brands Hatch, Sharp placed third during the final race in Snetterton. This was followed by a double third place in Thruxton, but lost the championship lead to William Macintyre following Silverstone. Nevertheless, he returned to winning ways with a double triumph in Croft. The gap widened after a lone podium in Knockhill, but a win and two further podiums in Donington Park meant Sharp retook the lead by a single point heading into the season finale. A win and a further podium there allowed Sharp to become champion by 13 points, he achieved six wins, four poles and fourteen podiums throughout the season. As the British F4 Champion, Sharp also won an experience in the Simulator of the Mercedes AMG Petronas F1 Team.

Motorsport News voted Sharp as (British) National Racing Driver of the Year for 2023, becoming the youngest ever driver to win the award, the first from outside Europe and the first single seater winner. He was also awarded the Henry Surtees Award, an accolade handed out by the British Racing Drivers' Club for the most outstanding performance by a member of the BRDC Rising Stars initiative.

=== GB3 (2024) ===
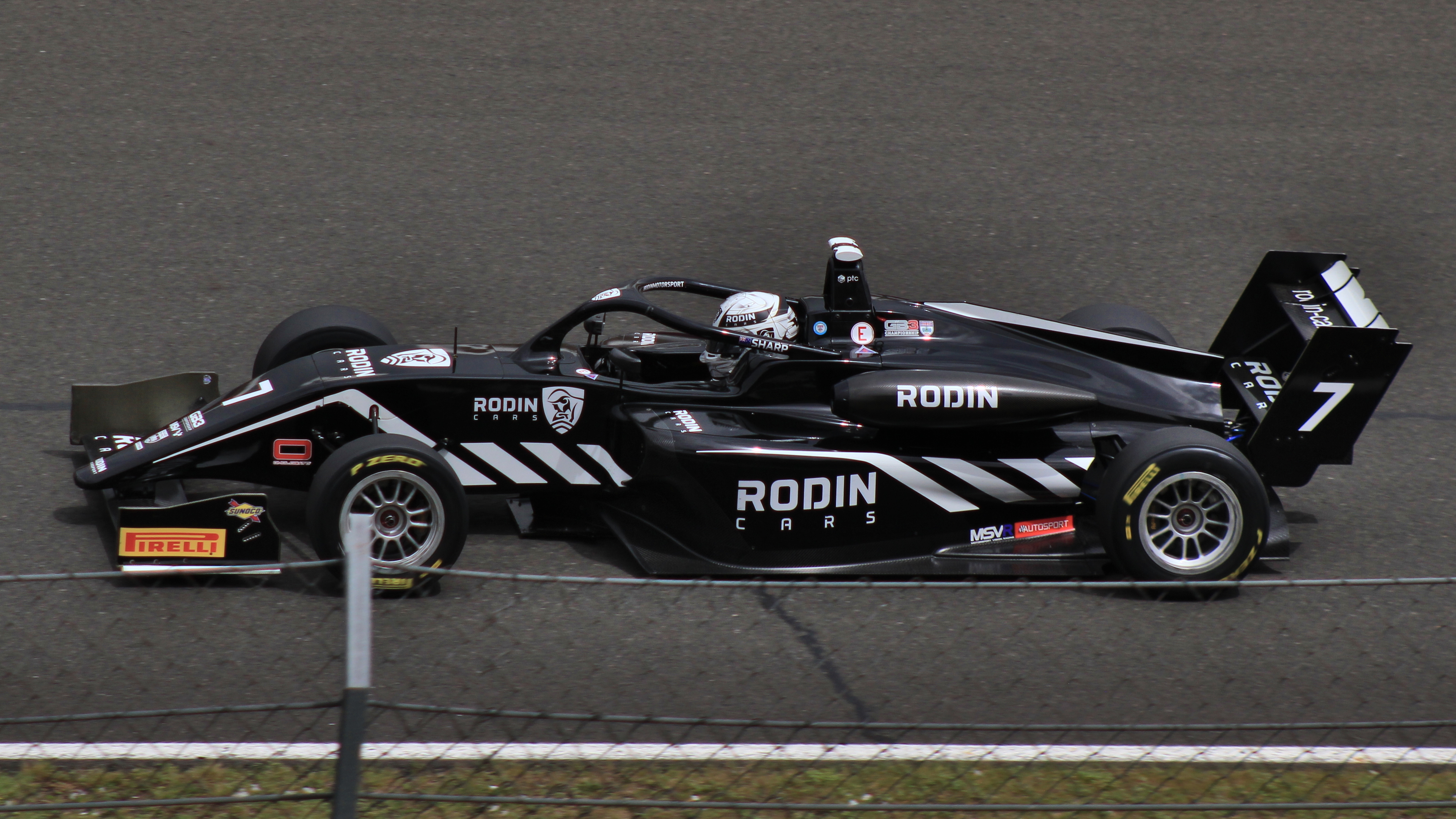
Sharp at the Hungaroring during the 2024 GB3 Championship

Sharp was announced to drive for Kiwi-team Rodin Motorsport for the 2024 GB3 Championship, which was the main sponsor of Rodin Carlin and had taken over the team in early 2024. Sharp started his campaign with a pole position at the first race of the first round at Oulton Park, he converted his maiden pole to a maiden win and got his second pole position in the next race, finishing that race in second place. Following two podiums at Spa-Francorchamps, Sharp achieved his second win of the season at the Hungaroring, and added two more podiums in Silverstone next time out. Sharp got two more pole positions at the penultimate round in Donington Park which he converted to wins. He led the championship by 33 points coming into the final round at Brands Hatch, with his closest rivals being Briton John Bennett and Pole Tymek Kucharczyk. By securing a win in the second race, a tenth place in the final race allowed him to secure the title; he took five wins, five poles, ten podiums and 478 points throughout the season.

For his efforts, Sharp was one of the four finalists for the Autosport BRDC Award.

=== FIA Formula 3 (2025–) ===
==== 2023 ====
Sharp joined Rodin Carlin for the final post-season test of the 2023 FIA Formula 3 Championship at Imola.

==== 2025 ====
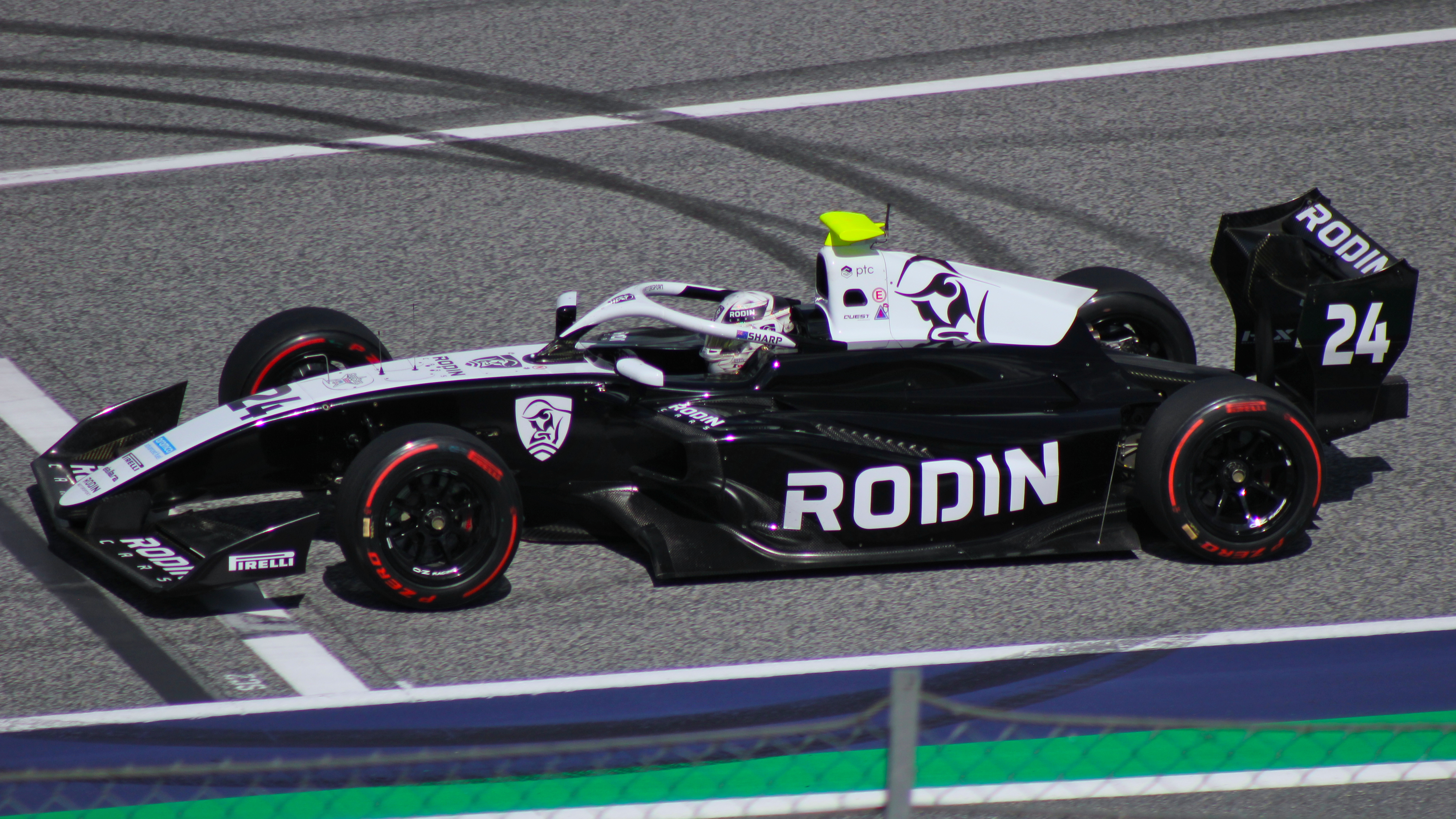
Sharp driving the Dallara F3 2025 during the 2025 Spielberg Formula 3 round

Shortly after clinching the GB3 title, Sharp was announced to be promoted to FIA Formula 3 for the 2025 season, continuing with Rodin Motorsport. Sharp failed to score during the first two rounds, but broke his duck with fifth on his debut in Imola qualifying. He secured his first points in the sprint race after a few passes allowed him to finish fourth, but struggled in the feature and dropped out of the points. He then had a double points finish in Monaco with two ninth place finish from 13th. Sharp did not score any more points for the rest of the season, although he ran in the points during a wet Silverstone feature race but crashed out in treacherous conditions. He finished 26th in the standings with nine points, behind teammates Roman Bilinski and Callum Voisin.

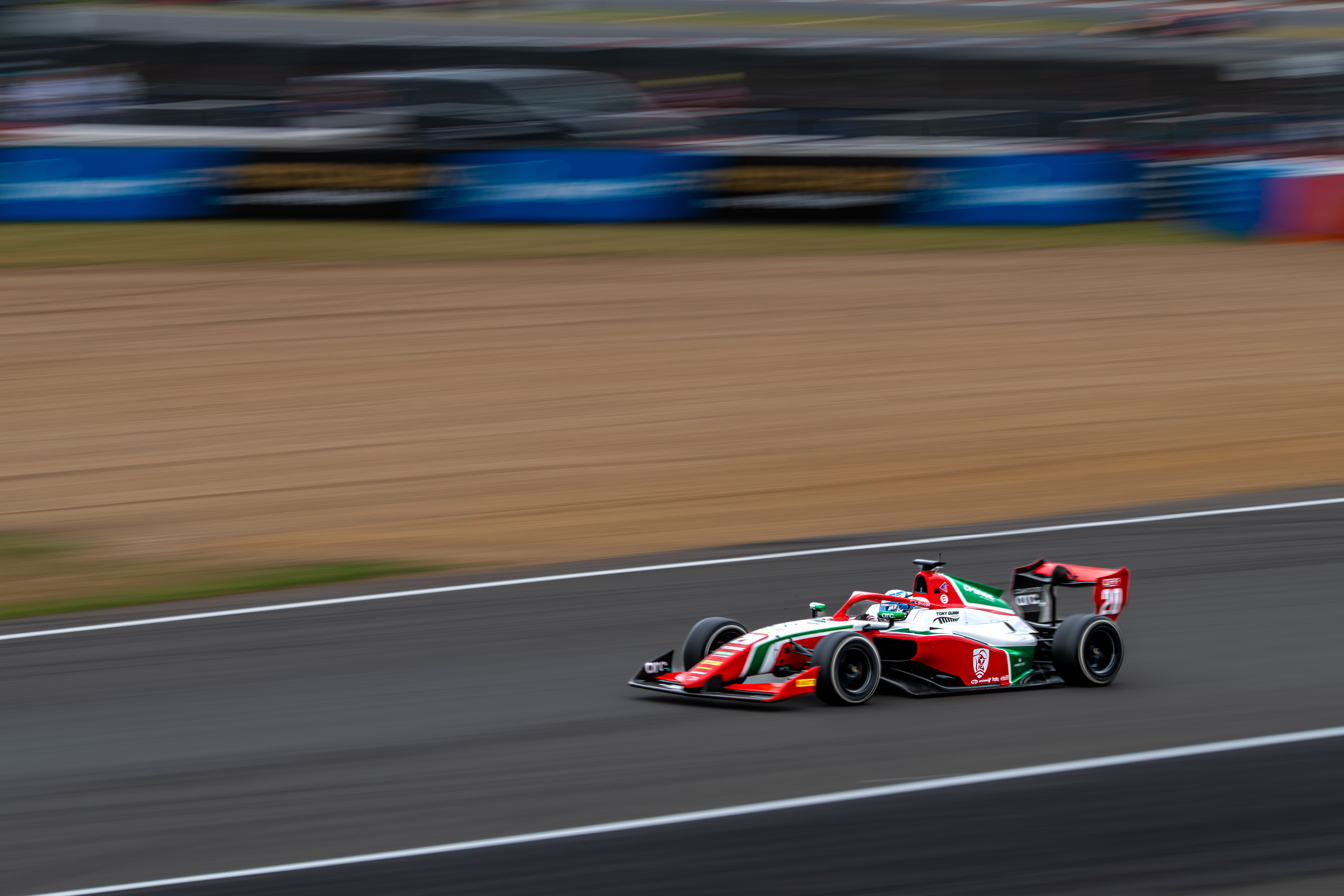
Louis Sharp driving for Prema Racing at the 2026 British Grand Prix weekend

Sharp completed both days of post-season testing with Prema Racing in Jerez.

==== 2026 ====
For the 2026 season, Sharp moved to Prema Racing alongside José Garfias and James Wharton. His campaign got off to a less than ideal start, as in his first F3 race of the year – Melbourne sprint – he heavily collided with teammate James Wharton whilst battling for seventh position. Both him and Wharton withdrawn from the following day's feature race on medical grounds. His best result of the year was in the fifth round at Silverstone Circuit, coming eighth in the sprint race and fourth in the feature. Prior to the Monza round, Sharp announced that he had split with Prema to focus on his 2027 plans and was replaced by Alex Powell.

In addition to his Formula 3 campaign, Sharp competed in the Formula Regional Oceania Trophy during the winter with mtec Motorsport. He won the first race of the opening weekend at Hampton Downs, his only win of the campaign. Sharp collected two more podiums in the next two rounds at race four of both Taupo, and Teretonga Park respectively. He got double podiums in the final round at Highlands Motorsport Park on his way to third in the championship standings, he also sealed the 2026 Tasman Series title, awarded to the best Australian or New Zealander in the championship.

== Other racing ventures ==
In January 2025, Sharp represented New Zealand in the 2025 Race of Champions.

== Karting record ==
=== Karting career summary ===
Season	Series	Team	Position
2014	Kartsport NZ National Schools Championship – Cadet class		18th
2015	Kartsport NZ National Sprint Championship – Cadet class		4th
2015	Kartsport NZ National Schools Championship – Cadet class		3rd
2016	Giltrap Group Kartsport NZ Sprint Championship – Cadet class		12th
2016	Kartsport NZ National Schools Championship – Cadet class		4th
2017	Sievwright Kartsport NZ National Sprint Championship – Cadet class		1st
2017	NZ Top Half Series – Cadet class		
2017	Kartsport Auckland City of Sails – Cadet Rok class		4th
2017	Kartsport NZ National Schools Championship – Cadet class		1st
2018	Kartsport NZ National Sprint Championship – Mini ROK class		2nd
2018	Kartsport NZ National Schools Championship presented by Napier Boys High School – Vortex Mini Rok		9th
2019	Kartsport NZ National Sprint Championship – Mini ROK class		1st
2019	ROK Cup Superfinal – Mini ROK	Av Racing	
2019	Kartsport NZ National Schools Championship – Vortex Mini Rok		11th

== Racing record ==
=== Racing career summary ===
Season	Series	Team	Races	Wins	Poles	F/Laps	Podiums	Points	Position
2020	Formula First Manfeild Winter Series	Sabre Motorsport	6	1	0	0	6	375	5th
2020–21	NZ Formula First Championship	Track Tec Racing	23	0	0	2	1	993	6th
2021–22	Yokohama South Island Formula 1600 Series	Louis Sharp	11	5	2	5	10	747	5th
2022	F4 British Championship	Carlin	27	2	0	1	12	272	4th
2022	Formula 4 UAE Championship – Trophy Round	Carlin	2	2	0	2	2	N/A	**1st**
2023	F4 British Championship	Rodin Carlin	30	6	4	4	14	384	**1st**
2024	GB3 Championship	Rodin Motorsport	23	5	5	1	10	478	**1st**
2025	FIA Formula 3 Championship	Rodin Motorsport	19	0	0	0	0	11	26th
2026	Formula Regional Oceania Trophy	mtec Motorsport	15	1	0	0	5	295	**3rd**
2026	Tasman Series	mtec Motorsport	15	1	0	0	5	295	**1st**
2026	FIA Formula 3 Championship	Prema Racing	13	0	0	2	0	21	21st

^{*} Season still in progress.

=== Complete F4 British Championship results ===
(key) (Races in bold indicate pole position) (Races in italics indicate fastest lap)

Year	Team	1	2	3	4	5	6	7	8	9	10	11	12	13	14	15	16	17	18	19	20	21	22	23	24	25	26	27	28	29	30	31	DC	Points
2022	Carlin	DON; 1	DON; 2	DON; 3	BHI; 1; 10	BHI; 2; 6	BHI; 3; 3	THR1; 1; 13	THR1; 2; 9	THR1; 3; 3	OUL; 1; 2	OUL; 2; 2^{5}	OUL; 3; 1	CRO; 1; 4	CRO; 2; 6	CRO; 3; 2	KNO; 1; 4	KNO; 2; 6	KNO; 3; 4	SNE; 1; 7	SNE; 2; 4	SNE; 3; 17	THR2; 1; 3	THR2; 2; 7^{1}	THR2; 3; 3	SIL; 1; 1	SIL; 2; 3^{3}	SIL; 3 Ret	BHGP; 1 Ret	BHGP; 2; 3^{1}	BHGP; 3; 2		4th	272
2023	Rodin Carlin	DPN; 1; 1	DPN; 2; 1^{10}	DPN; 3; 6	BHI; 1 Ret	BHI; 2; 4^{3}	BHI; 3; 4	SNE; 1 C	SNE; 2; 13^{6}	SNE; 3; 3	THR; 1; 3	THR; 2; 12^{7}	THR; 3; 3	OUL; 1; 4	OUL; 2; 19	OUL; 3; 6	SIL; 1; 12	SIL; 2; 3^{7}	SIL; 3; 9	**CRO**; **1**; 1	CRO; 2; 16^{3}	**CRO**; **3**; 1	KNO; 1; 2	KNO; 2; 15^{1}	KNO; 3; 7	DPGP; 1; 1	DPGP; 2; 3	DPGP; 3; 6^{10}	DPGP; 4; 3	**BHGP**; **1**; 1	BHGP; 2; 11^{8}	**BHGP**; **3**; 2	1st	384

=== Complete GB3 Championship results ===
(key) (Races in bold indicate pole position) (Races in italics indicate fastest lap)

Year	Team	1	2	3	4	5	6	7	8	9	10	11	12	13	14	15	16	17	18	19	20	21	22	23	24	DC	Points
2024	Rodin Motorsport	**OUL**; **1**; 1	**OUL**; **2**; 2	OUL; 3; 5^{7}	SIL1; 1; 4	SIL1; 2; 5	SIL1; 3 C	SPA; 1; 3	SPA; 2; 3	SPA; 3 Ret	HUN; 1; 7	HUN; 2; 1	HUN; 3; 4	ZAN; 1; 4	ZAN; 2 Ret	ZAN; 3; 7^{2}	SIL2; 1; 2	SIL2; 2; 2	SIL2; 3; 7^{4}	**DON**; **1**; 1	**DON**; **2**; 1	DON; 3; 6^{6}	BRH; 1; 7	**BRH**; **2**; 1	BRH; 3; 10	1st	478

=== Complete FIA Formula 3 Championship results ===
(key) (Races in bold indicate pole position) (Races in italics indicate fastest lap)

Year	Entrant	1	2	3	4	5	6	7	8	9	10	11	12	13	14	15	16	17	18	19	20	DC	Points
2025	Rodin Motorsport	MEL; SPR; 18	MEL; FEA; 14	BHR; SPR; 14	BHR; FEA; 23	IMO; SPR; 4	IMO; FEA; 12	MON; SPR; 9	MON; FEA; 9	CAT; SPR; 13	CAT; FEA; 12	RBR; SPR; Ret	RBR; FEA; 16	SIL; SPR; 21	SIL; FEA; Ret	SPA; SPR; 25	SPA; FEA; C	HUN; SPR; 16	HUN; FEA; 11	MNZ; SPR; 21	MNZ; FEA; Ret	26th	11
2026	Prema Racing	MEL; SPR; 16	MEL; FEA; WD	MON; SPR; 17	MON; FEA; 12	CAT; SPR; 9	CAT; FEA; 19	RBR; SPR; 14	RBR; FEA; 13	SIL; SPR; 8	SIL; FEA; 4	SPA; SPR; 13	SPA; FEA; 16	HUN; SPR; 12	HUN; FEA; 8	MNZ; SPR	MNZ; FEA	MAD; SPR	MAD; FEA1	MAD; FEA2		21st	21

=== Complete Formula Regional Oceania Trophy results ===
(key) (Races in bold indicate pole position) (Races in italics indicate fastest lap)

Year	Team	1	2	3	4	5	6	7	8	9	10	11	12	13	14	15	16	DC	Points
2026	mtec Motorsport	HMP; 1; 1	HMP; 2; 13	HMP; 3; 11	HMP; 4; 5	TAU; 1; 4	TAU; 2; 4	TAU; 3; 4	TAU; 4; 3	TER; 1; 12	TER; 2; 8	TER; 3 C	TER; 4; 2	HIG; 1; 3	HIG; 2; 3	HIG; 3; 4	HIG; 4; 6	3rd	295

=== Complete New Zealand Grand Prix results ===
Year	Team	Car	Qualifying	Main race
2026	(New Zealand) mtec Motorsport	Tatuus FT-60 - Toyota	5th	6th

Sporting positions
Preceded by Alex Dunne	F4 British Championship; Champion; 2023	Succeeded by Deagen Fairclough
Preceded by Callum Voisin	GB3 Championship; Champion; 2024	Succeeded by Alex Ninovic
Preceded by Zack Scoular	Tasman Cup; Champion; 2026	Succeeded by Incumbent
