= Deagen Fairclough =

British racing driver (born 2006)

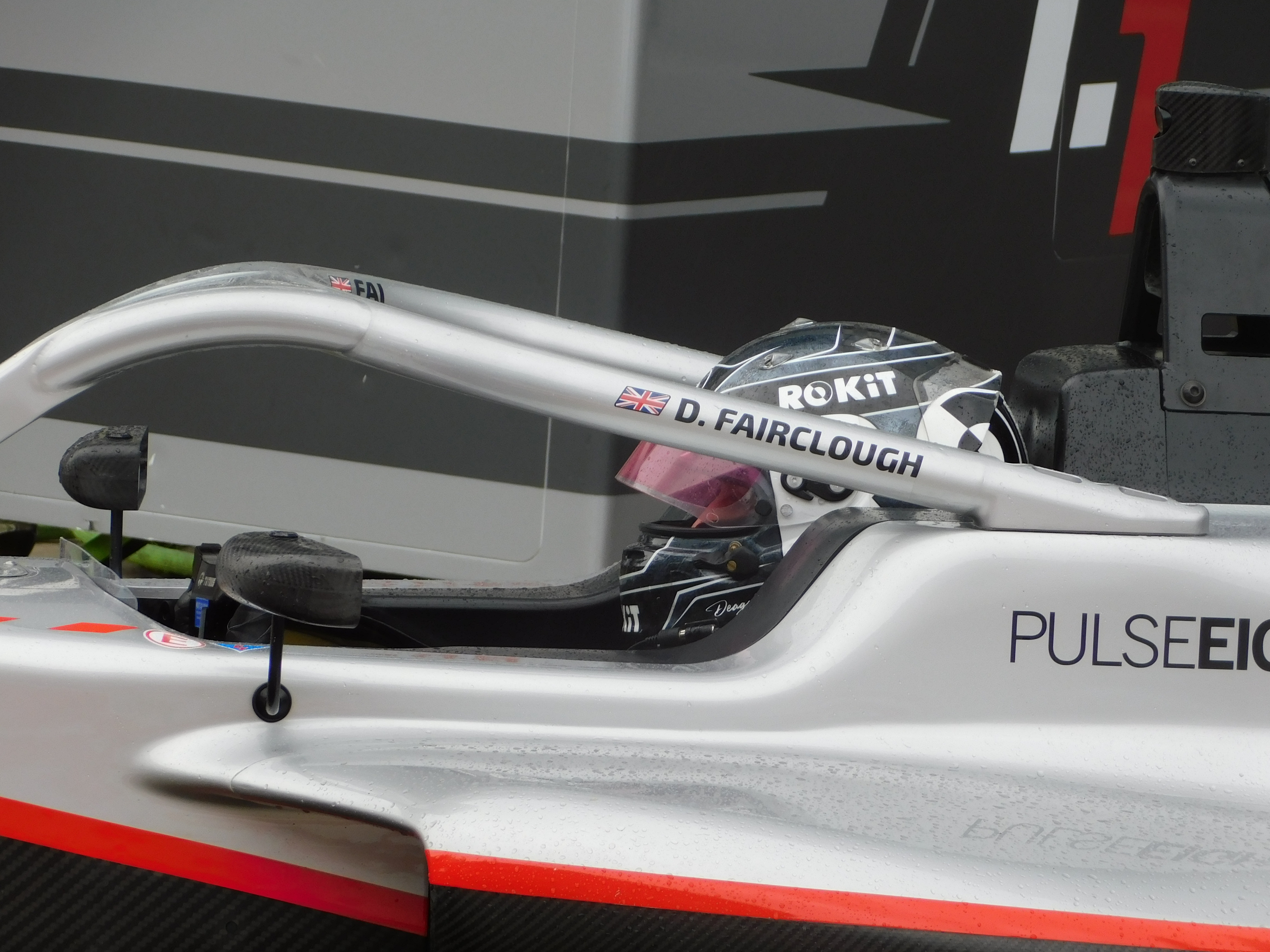
- Fairclough in 2024
- Nationality: United Kingdom
- Born: 23 April 2006 (age 20) Crawley, United Kingdom

GB3 Championship career
- Debut season: 2025
- Current team: Hitech
- Car number: 7
- Starts: 43
- Wins: 8
- Podiums: 14
- Poles: 5
- Fastest laps: 7
- Best finish: 3rd in 2025

Previous series
- 2024 2024 2023–2024 2021–2022 2020–2021: Euro 4 F4 UAE; F4 British; BRSCC Ford Fiesta Junior; Junior Saloon Car

Championship titles
- 2024: F4 British Championship

Awards
- 2024: Autosport BRDC Award

Deagen Fairclough (born 23 April 2006) is a British racing driver currently racing in the GB3 Championship with Hitech.

Fairclough is the 2024 F4 British champion, and finished third in 2023 and in the 2025 GB3 Championship. He is the winner of the 2024 Autosport BRDC Award.

== Career ==
=== Junior cars ===
In 2020, Fairclough began his car racing career after a little karting experience, which he started at the age of five. Fairclough was just thirteen years old when he started racing for Orex Racing in the Junior Saloon Car Championship, and he managed to finish in sixth place by the end of the year. For 2021, Fairclough moved to a part-time season in the Fiesta Junior Championship driving for Jamsport with Ciceley Motorsport. He amassed eight wins from fourteen races on the way to fifth in the drivers standings.

=== Formula 4 ===
==== 2023 ====
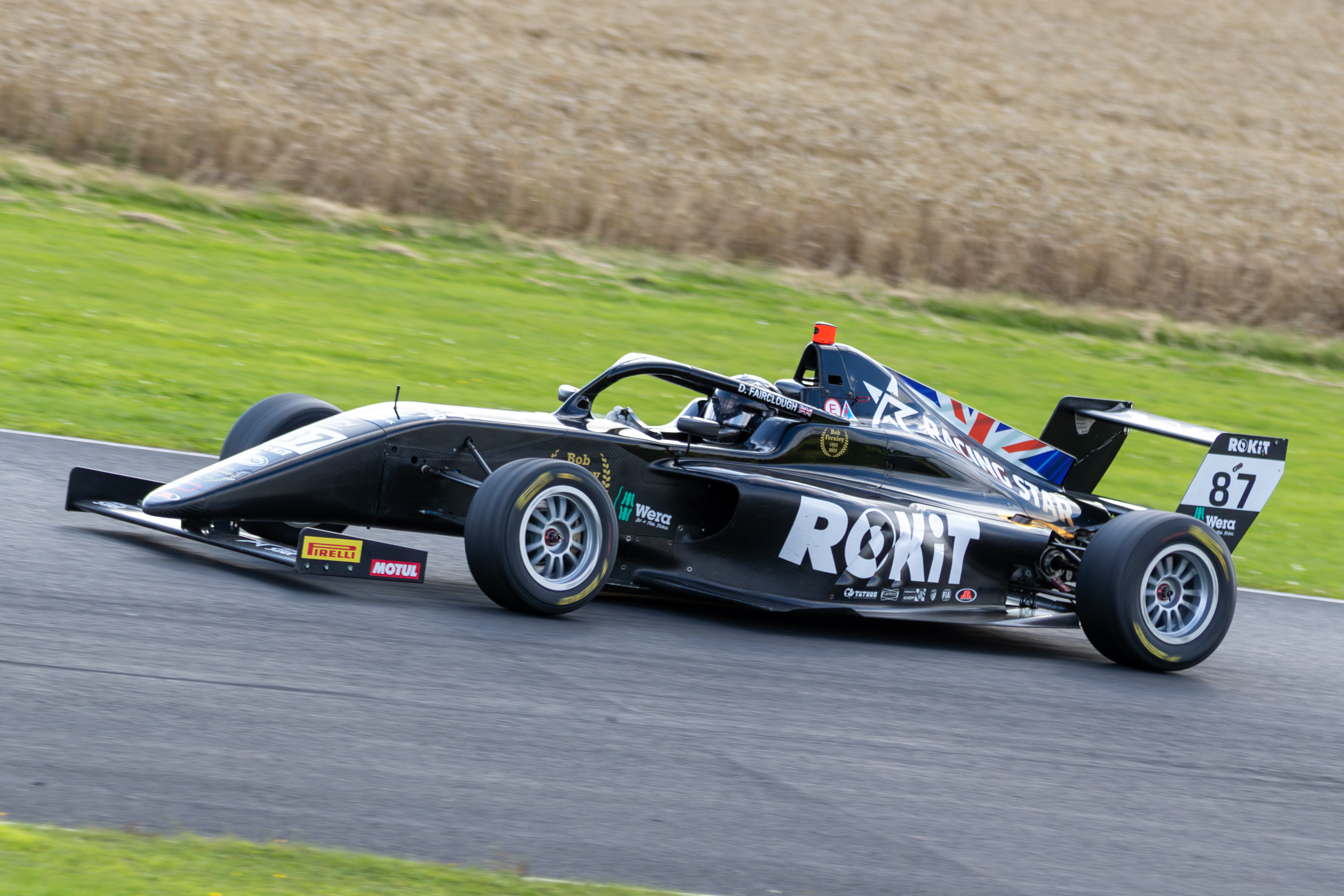
Fairclough racing at the Croft Circuit during the 2023 F4 British Championship

On 15 May 2022, Fairclough won the ROKiT - Racing Star F4 Esports Competition UK, organised by ROKiT and Racing Unleashed, alongside Monica Boulton Ramos. The prize for winning the competition was a free seat in the 2023 F4 British Championship with a new team; ROKiT F4 Racing, which would be run by Hitech GP. Instead, Fairclough impressed enough to get a full time seat at JHR Developments. Fairclough got off to a strong start to the championship, with five top-ten finishes in the first six races, including a podium at Brands Hatch Indy. He went on to score three more podiums before round eight, in which he scored his first win. Fairclough wrapped up the season strongly, with two more wins in the final two rounds to finish third in his opening season.

==== 2024 ====
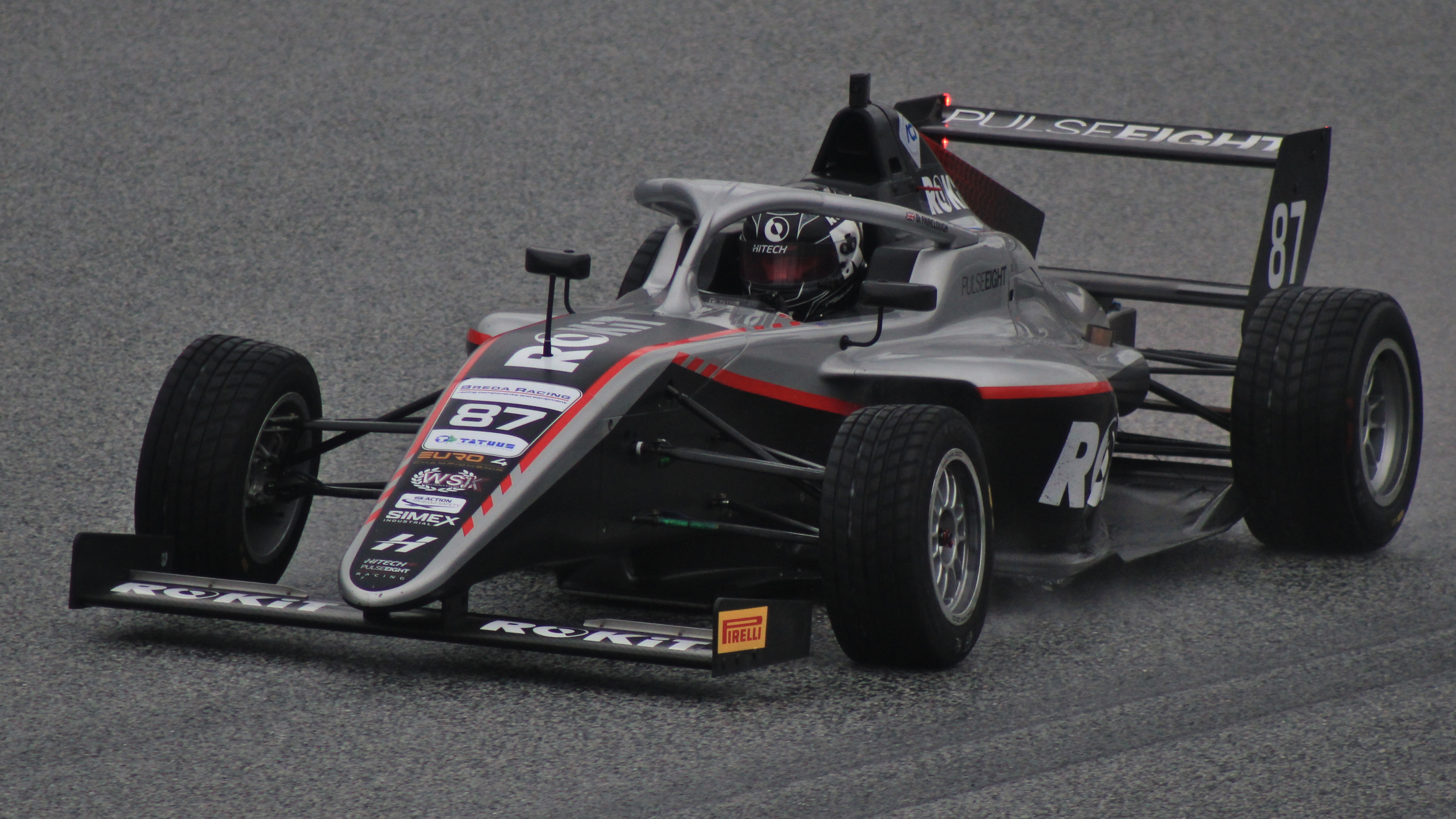
Fairclough driving at the Red Bull Ring during the 2024 Euro 4 Championship

On 9 November 2023, it was announced that Fairclough would race for Hitech GP in the 2024 F4 British Championship. In addition, he would race for them in the UAE in preparation for the British F4 season. Fairclough finished seventh in the championship standings, with two podiums and a best result of second to his name. Fairclough had a strong pre-season, topping the timesheets in a number of British F4 tests. His pace was evident from the first round, where he recorded first and second-placed finishes at Donington Park. Fairclough continued to dominate in the following rounds, with wins at every round but one over the course of the season. He took the title with five races to spare at Silverstone. Fairclough then proceeded to win three more times despite already winning the title, as he had a record-breaking season, as he is the current record-holder of the most races won in a single British F4 season, with fourteen races won out of the thirty that he contested.

Fairclough also took part in a one-off round in the Euro 4 Championship at the Red Bull Ring with Hitech; he scored no points with a best finish of eleventh in the second race.

=== GB3 Championship ===
==== 2025 ====
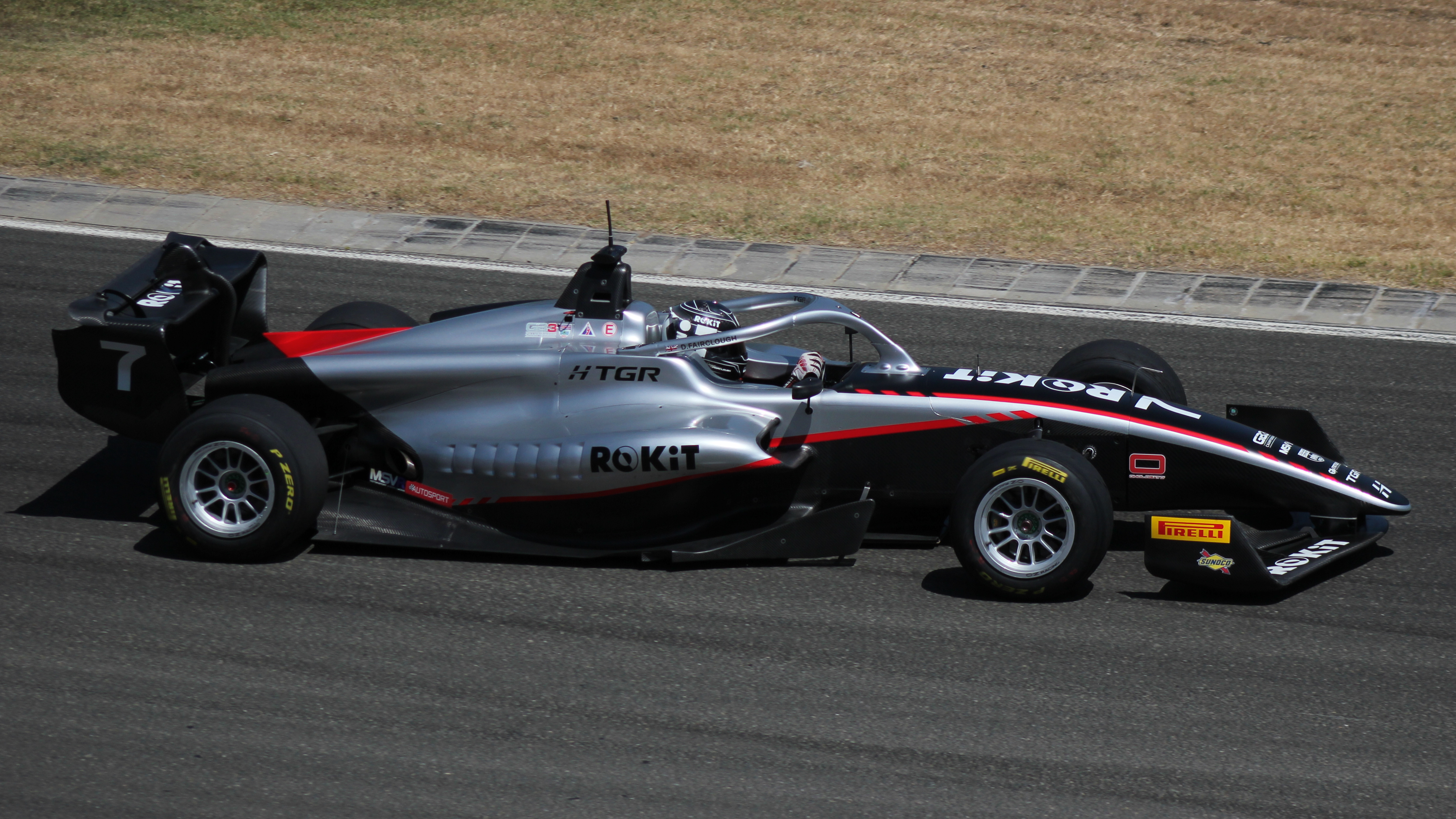
Fairclough driving at the Hungaroring during the 2025 GB3 Championship

In October 2024, Fairclough was announced to be stepping up to the GB3 Championship for 2025, remaining with Hitech Pulse-Eight.

==== 2026 ====
Fairclough continued in GB3 with Hitech in 2026.

=== Formula One ===
For his efforts in British F4, Fairclough was nominated for the 2024 Autosport BRDC Award alongside Freddie Slater, Arvid Lindblad and Louis Sharp. At the end of January 2025, Fairclough was named as the winner of the award. Fairclough successfully completed his test in September, driving the Aston Martin AMR23, in which he described it as a "dream come true" despite prematurely ending his run in the barriers at the Copse corner.

== Racing record ==
=== Racing career summary ===
Season	Series	Team	Races	Wins	Poles	F/Laps	Podiums	Points	Position
2020	Junior Saloon Car Championship	Orex Racing	12	0	0	0	3	187	6th
2021	Junior Saloon Car Championship	Orex Racing	2	0	0	0	0	13	34th
2021	BRSCC Ford Fiesta Junior Championship	Jamsport with Ciceley Motorsport	14	8	7	13	11	471	5th
2022	BRSCC Ford Fiesta Junior Championship	Jamsport with Ciceley Motorsport	2	0	1	0	1	43	17th
2023	F4 British Championship	JHR Developments	30	3	0	6	8	296	**3rd**
2024	Formula 4 UAE Championship	Hitech Pulse-Eight	15	0	0	0	2	75	7th
2024	F4 British Championship	Hitech Pulse-Eight	30	14	15	19	22	579.5	**1st**
2024	Euro 4 Championship	Hitech Pulse-Eight	3	0	0	0	0	0	24th
2025	GB3 Championship	Hitech TGR	24	1	0	0	7	373	**3rd**
2026	GB3 Championship	Hitech	22	7	5	7	7	401	**2nd**

* Season still in progress.

=== Complete F4 British Championship results ===
(key) (Races in bold indicate pole position; races in italics indicate fastest lap)

Year	Team	1	2	3	4	5	6	7	8	9	10	11	12	13	14	15	16	17	18	19	20	21	22	23	24	25	26	27	28	29	30	31	32	DC	Points
2023	JHR Developments	DPN; 1; 5	DPN; 2; 10^{4}	DPN; 3; 4	BHI; 1; 4	BHI; 2; 3^{1}	BHI; 3; 17	SNE; 1 C	SNE; 2; 17	SNE; 3; 8	THR; 1; 15	THR; 2; 4^{10}	THR; 3; 6	OUL; 1; 3	OUL; 2; 8^{6}	OUL; 3; 4	SIL; 1; 6	SIL; 2; 2^{10}	SIL; 3; 4	CRO; 1; 5	CRO; 2; 7^{8}	CRO; 3; 3	KNO; 1; 7	KNO; 2; 1^{1}	KNO; 3; 10	DPGP; 1; 12	DPGP; 2; 4	DPGP; 3; 1^{7}	DPGP; 4; 8	BHGP; 1; 2	BHGP; 2; 6^{10}	BHGP; 3; 1		3rd	296
2024	Hitech Pulse-Eight	DPN; 1; 1	DPN; 2; 2^{7}	DPN; 3 C	**BHI**; **1**; 1	BHI; 2; 7^{5}	**BHI**; **3**; 1	SNE; 1; 3	SNE; 2; 3^{8}	SNE; 3 NC	**THR**; **1**; 1	THR; 2; 5^{7}	**THR**; **3** Ret	**SILGP**; **1**; 1	SILGP; 2 Ret	SILGP; 3; 2	**ZAN**; **1**; 1	ZAN; 2; 3^{9}	**ZAN**; **3**; 1	**KNO**; **1**; 1	KNO; 2; 5^{7}	**KNO**; **3**; 1	**DPGP**; **1**; 2	DPGP; 2; 2	DPGP; 3; 2^{10}	**DPGP**; **4**; 1	**SILN**; **1**; 1	SILN; 2 C	**SILN**; **3**; 1	**BHGP**; **1**; 1	BHGP; 2; 5^{5}	BHGP; 3; 5^{7}	**BHGP**; **4**; 1	1st	579.5

=== Complete Formula 4 UAE Championship results ===
(key) (Races in bold indicate pole position; races in italics indicate fastest lap)

Year	Team	1	2	3	4	5	6	7	8	9	10	11	12	13	14	15	DC	Points
2024	Hitech Pulse-Eight	YMC1; 1; 7	YMC1; 2; 2	YMC1; 3; 4	YMC2; 1; 13	YMC2; 2; 15	YMC2; 3; 4	DUB1; 1 Ret	DUB1; 2 Ret	DUB1; 3; 25	YMC3; 1 Ret	YMC3; 2; 23	YMC3; 3; 6	DUB2; 1; 8	DUB2; 2; 3	DUB2; 3 Ret	7th	75

=== Complete Euro 4 Championship results ===
(key) (Races in bold indicate pole position; races in italics indicate fastest lap)

Year	Team	1	2	3	4	5	6	7	8	9	DC	Points
2024	Hitech Pulse-Eight	MUG; 1	MUG; 2	MUG; 3	RBR; 1; 12	RBR; 2; 11	RBR; 3; 14	MNZ; 1	MNZ; 2	MNZ; 3	24th	0

=== Complete GB3 Championship results ===
(key) (Races in bold indicate pole position) (Races in italics indicate fastest lap)

Year	Team	1	2	3	4	5	6	7	8	9	10	11	12	13	14	15	16	17	18	19	20	21	22	23	24	DC	Points
2025	Hitech TGR	SIL1; 1; 17	SIL1; 2; 22	SIL1; 3; 7^{12}	ZAN; 1; 2	ZAN; 2; 3	ZAN; 3; 4^{7}	SPA; 1; 19	SPA; 2; 11	SPA; 3; 5^{12}	HUN; 1; 6	HUN; 2; 6	HUN; 3; 5^{3}	SIL2; 1; 4	SIL2; 2; 20	SIL2; 3 Ret	BRH; 1; 3	BRH; 2; 3	BRH; 3; 18	DON; 1; 6	DON; 2; 3	DON; 3; 15	MNZ; 1; 4	MNZ; 2; 1	MNZ; 3; 2^{7}	3rd	373
2026	Hitech	SIL1; 1; 4	SIL1; 2 Ret	SIL1; 3 Ret	SPA; 1 Ret	SPA; 2; 4	SPA; 3 C	HUN; 1; 1	HUN; 2 Ret	HUN; 3 Ret	RBR; 1; 4	RBR; 2; 17	RBR; 3 DNS	**SIL2**; **1**; 1	**SIL2**; **2**; 1	SIL2; 3; 10^{2}	DON; 1; 1	**DON**; **2**; 1	DON; 3; 5^{7}	**BRH**; **1**; 1	**BRH**; **2**; 1	BRH; 3; 5^{7}	CAT; 1; 9	CAT; 2; 10	CAT; 3; 6^{12}	2nd	401

* Season still in progress.

Sporting positions
Preceded by Louis Sharp	F4 British Championship; Champion; 2024	Succeeded by Fionn McLaughlin
