= Kanato Le =

Japanese racing driver (born 2007)

- りー海夏澄
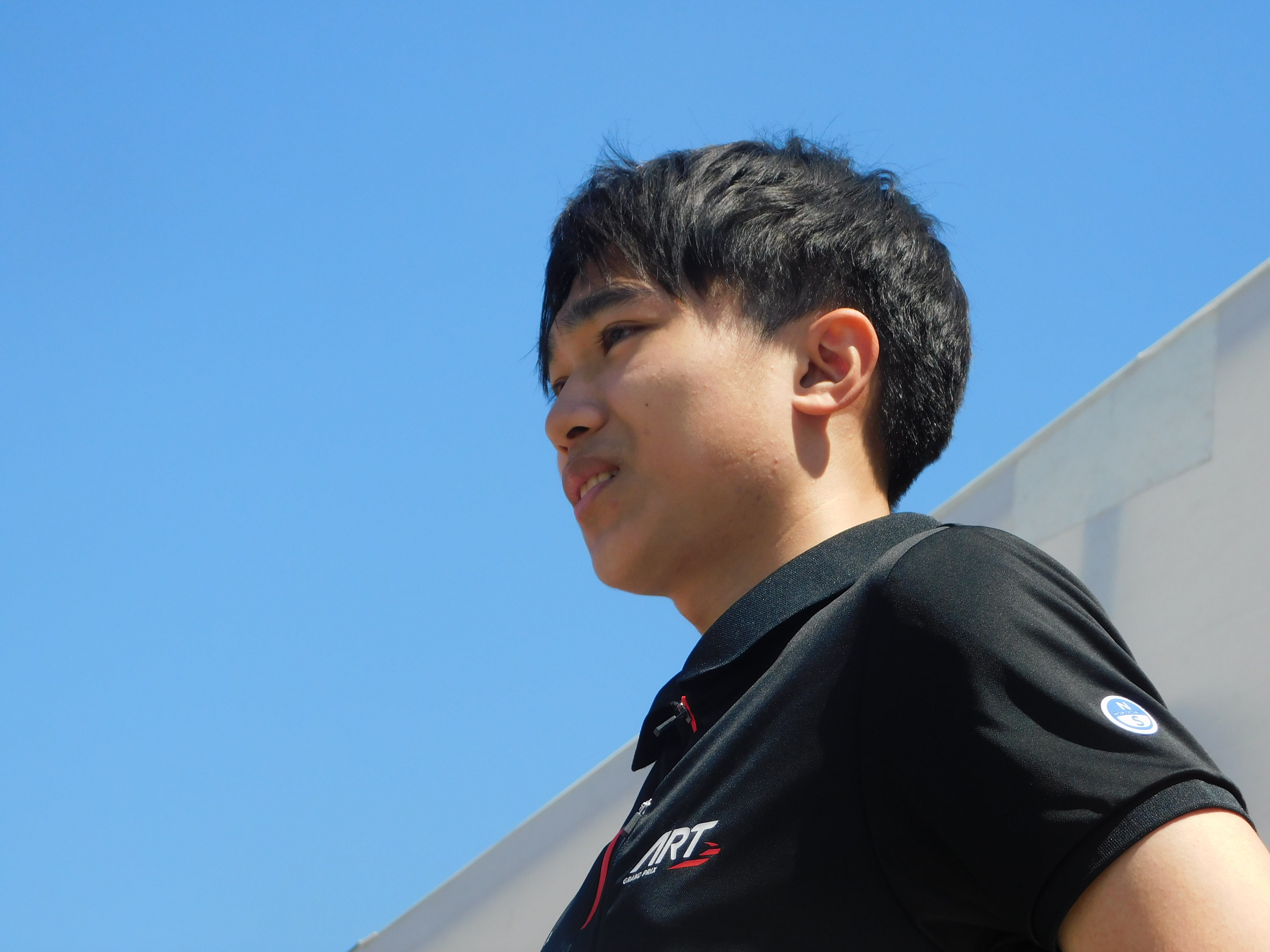
- Le in 2025
- Born: 4 July 2007 (age 19); Tokyo, Japan
- Nationality: (Japan) Japanese

FIA Formula 3 Championship career
- Debut season: 2026
- Current team: Hitech
- Car number: TBA
- Former teams: ART Grand Prix
- Starts: 19
- Wins: 0
- Podiums: 1
- Poles: 0
- Fastest laps: 0
- Best finish: 20th in 2026

Previous series
- 2026; 2024–2025; 2024–2026; 2024–2025; 2023; 2023; 2022: FR Oceania; FR Europe; GB3; FR Middle East; F4 British; F4 UAE; Ginetta Junior
- Statistics up to date as of 12 October 2026.

Kanato Le (Japanese: りー海夏澄, Hepburn: Rī Kanato; born 4 July 2007) is a Japanese racing driver who is set to compete in the FIA Formula 3 Championship for Hitech.

Le has competed in the 2023 F4 British Championship, finishing seventh overall, and in the Formula Regional European Championship with G4 Racing and ART Grand Prix. He made a step up to FIA Formula 3 for the 2026 season.

== Career ==
=== Karting ===
Le had a consistent karting career where he was the most successful in IAME events in the X30 Junior class, finishing runner-up to the 2020 IAME Euro Series and won the title the next year, he also came runner-up in the 2021 IAME Winter Cup.

=== Ginetta Junior Championship ===
In 2022, Le made his foray into car racing in the 2022 Ginetta Junior Championship with Elite Motorsport. He got two wins, one pole position and five podiums, and came seventh in the championship. He was the second highest rookie, behind 2023 F4 British Championship runner-up, William Macintyre.

=== Formula 4 ===
==== Formula 4 UAE Championship ====
In late 2022, Le made his debut in the trophy round of the 2023 Formula 4 UAE Championship for Hitech Pulse-Eight, with fellow 2023 F4 British Championship competitors, James Piszcyk, William Macintyre and 2023 GB3 Championship driver Alex Dunne. He finished fifth and second in the races.

Le also drove in the 2023 Formula 4 UAE Championship with his teammates in the trophy round, barring the exception of Dunne, who would be replaced by Red Bull Junior Team member Arvid Lindblad. After coming up pointless in the first round, Le scored his first points at the Kuwait Motor Town and had an inconsistent season, but came home with 22 points and finished 17th place in the championship.

==== F4 British Championship ====
Alongside his Formula 4 UAE campaign, Le was announced to be driving in the 2023 F4 British Championship with Hitech Pulse-Eight. He was rejoined by Formula 4 UAE teammates Macintyre, Piszcyk and newcomer Gabriel Stilp.

Le kicked off his season with two points finishes at Donington Park, before taking his first win during the first race of the second round at Brands Hatch. A podium followed at the next round in Snetterton, before securing his second win at Oulton Park. He took his last podium of the series at the third-to-last round at Knockhill. Le finished the championship in seventh place, with 195 points.

=== GB3 Championship ===
==== 2024 ====
Le made his debut in the 2024 GB3 Championship with Chris Dittmann Racing at Spa-Francorchamps. His best result was a fifth place after making up nine positions at the third round, and he came 23rd in the drivers championship with 46 points.

==== 2025 ====
Le continued in GB3 in 2025 for selected rounds with Hillspeed, in line with his main FRECA campaign. He took his maiden win in the series in race two at Spa-Francorchamps, a weekend where he finished on the podium for all three races.

==== 2026 ====
Le made a one-off appearance in the penultimate round of the 2026 GB3 Championship at Brands Hatch with Hitech, where he scored a podium in the final race.

=== Formula Regional ===
==== 2024 ====
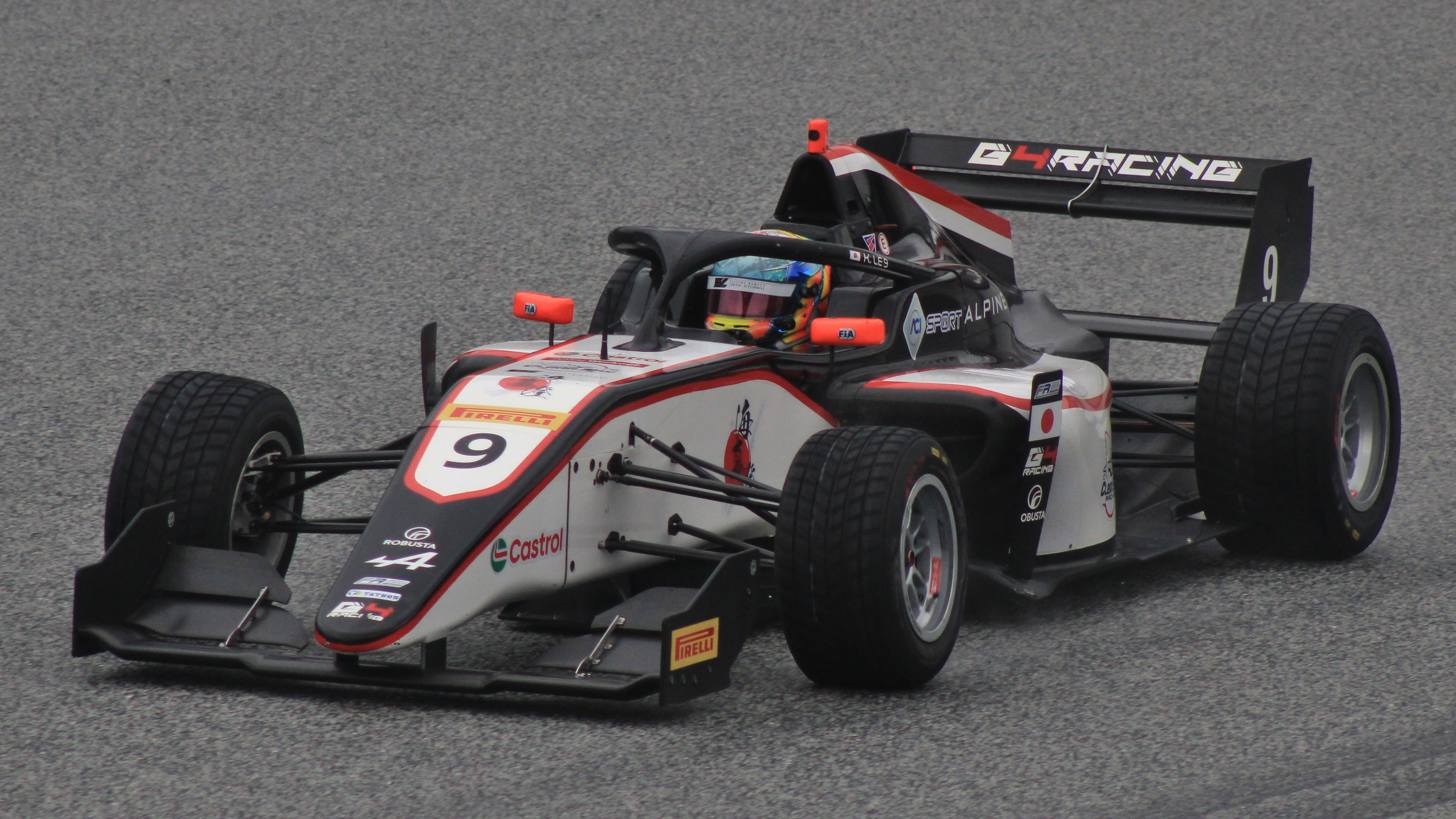
Le driving at the Hungaroring during the 2024 Formula Regional European Championship

Le was announced to be a part of the R-ace GP lineup for the 2024 Formula Regional Middle East Championship, alongside experienced drivers Tuukka Taponen, Martinius Stenshorne, Zachary David and Jesse Carrasquedo Jr. He drove in the final two rounds and scored a lone point in his campaign at the second to last race at the Dubai Autodrome. Le finished 22nd in the overall standings.

Le drove in the Formula Regional European Championship for his main campaign with G4 Racing, alongside FRMEC teammate Carrasquedo, and French F4 driver Romain Andriolo. He had a difficult year, with his first points finish being a third place finish in the twelfth race at Le Castellet. After that he only got two more points finishes at the final two rounds of the season. Le came 18th in the drivers' championship with 27 points, the team's highest-placed driver.

==== 2025 ====
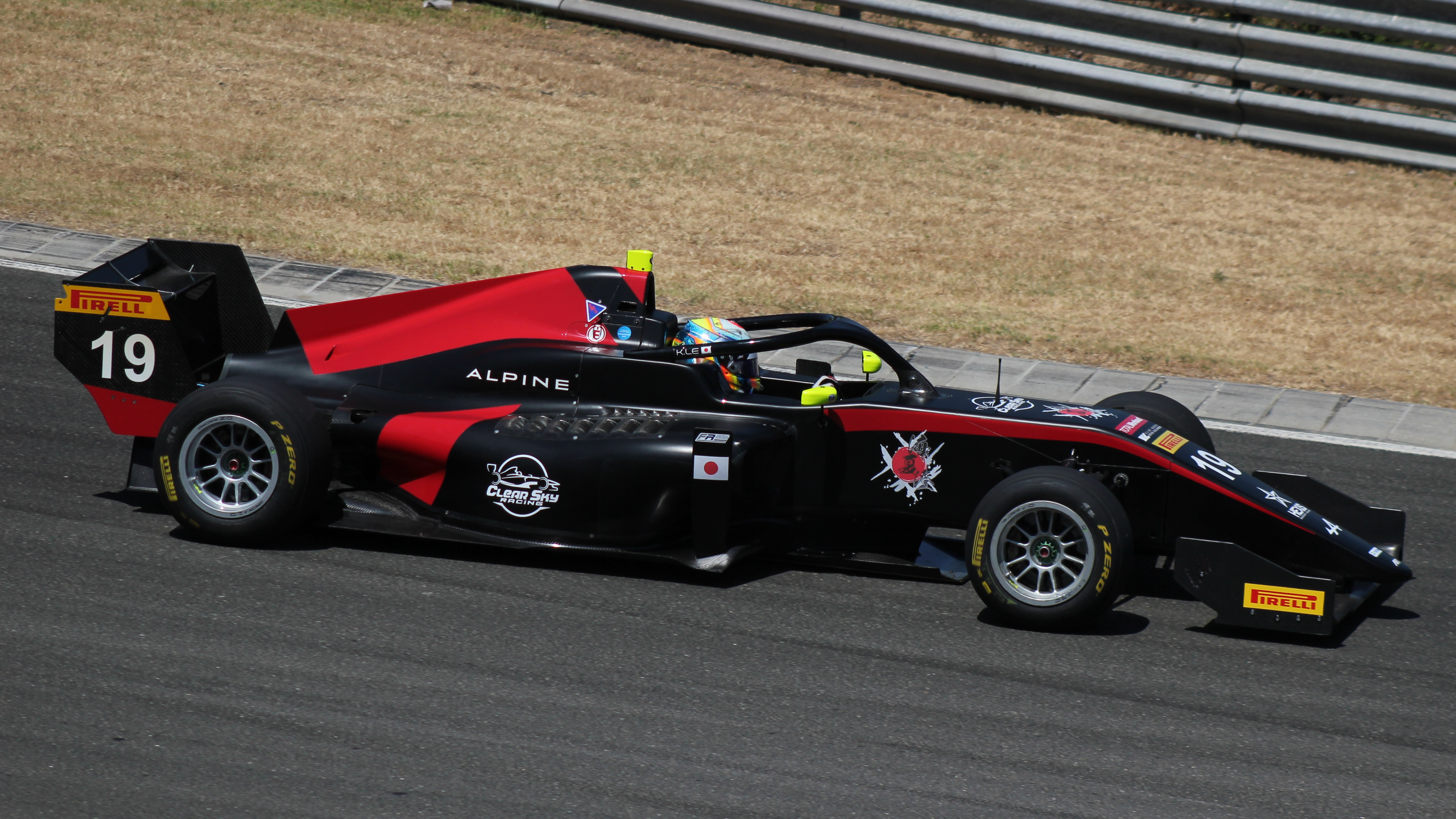
Le driving at the Hungaroring during the 2025 Formula Regional European Championship

For 2025, Le signed with ART Grand Prix to compete in the 2025 Formula Regional Middle East Championship and the Formula Regional European Championship with them alongside Evan Giltaire and Taito Kato. In the Middle East, he took his first win in Formula Regional during the second race of the opening round. He did not finish on the podium again, but consistent points finishes saw him finish eighth overall.

In the European season, after failing to score in the opening round, Le took a best finish of fourth in race two at Spa.

==== 2026 ====
In the winter, Le competed in the Formula Regional Oceania Trophy with Hitech. He took a podium in three out of four races in the opening round at Hampton Downs, and collected his fifth podium in the final race of the second round at Taupo. He claimed his first race win in the third race of the final round at Highlands Motorsport Park, and took another podium in the final race en route to sixth in the standings.

=== Macau Grand Prix ===
Le took part in the 2024 Macau Grand Prix with ART Grand Prix. He did not finish the race due to an accident on lap 1.

=== FIA Formula 3 ===
==== 2026 ====
Le stepped up to Formula 3 in 2026, continuing with ART Grand Prix. He took his first point with a tenth place in the second round at the Monaco Sprint Race, but his position was upgraded to a ninth place after countryman and race winner, Hiyu Yamakoshi, was disqualified from the race. Ultimately his best weekend of the season came in the seventh round at the Hungaroring, where he started the sprint race on pole and claimed his maiden podium in the race. Le qualified on the front row in the feature race penultimate round at Monza, but came in fifth by the races end. Le finished the championship twentieth in the standings.

==== 2027 ====
Le will return to Hitech for his sophomore Formula 3 campaign in 2027, alongside Keanu Al Azhari and Michael Shin.

== Personal life ==
Le's father is Vietnamese American, while his mother is Japanese.

== Karting record ==
=== Karting career summary ===
Season	Series	Team	Position
2019	Motorsport UK Kartmasters Grand Prix - X30 Mini	Fusion Motorsport	7th
2019	IAME Asia Final - Junior	AutoInc Racing	9th
2019	British Kart Championship - X30 Mini	Fusion Motorsport	18th
2020	IAME International Games - X30 Junior	Fusion Motorsport	5th
2020	Kartmasters British Grand Prix - Rotax Junior		6th
2020	IAME Winter Cup - X30 Junior	Fusion Motorsport	13th
2020	IAME Euro Series - X30 Junior		2nd
2021	LGM Series - Junior X30	Strawberry Racing	19th
2021	IAME International Games - X30 Junior	Strawberry Racing	5th
2021	British Kart Championship - X30 Junior	Strawberry Racing	9th
2021	IAME Warriors Final - X30 Junior	Strawberry Racing	11th
2021	IAME Euro Series - X30 Junior	Strawberry Racing	1st
2021	IAME Winter Cup - X30 Junior	Fusion Motorsport	2nd

== Racing record ==
=== Racing career summary ===
Season	Series	Team	Races	Wins	Poles	F/Laps	Podiums	Points	Position
2022	Ginetta Junior Championship	Elite Motorsport	25	2	1	0	5	374	7th
2022	Formula 4 UAE Championship - Trophy Round	Hitech Pulse-Eight	2	0	0	0	1	—N/a	NC
2023	Formula 4 UAE Championship	Hitech Pulse-Eight	15	0	0	0	0	22	17th
2023	F4 British Championship	Hitech Pulse-Eight	30	2	0	4	4	195	7th
2024	Formula Regional Middle East Championship	R-ace GP	6	0	0	0	0	1	22nd
2024	Formula Regional European Championship	G4 Racing	20	0	0	0	1	27	18th
2024	GB3 Championship	Chris Dittmann Racing	3	0	0	0	0	46	23rd
2024	Macau Grand Prix	ART Grand Prix	1	0	0	0	0	—N/a	DNF
2025	Formula Regional Middle East Championship	ART Grand Prix	15	1	0	1	1	119	8th
2025	Formula Regional European Championship	ART Grand Prix	20	0	0	0	0	30	14th
2025	Macau Grand Prix	ART Grand Prix	1	0	0	0	0	—N/a	11st
2025	GB3 Championship	Hillspeed	9	1	1	0	3	145	14th
2026	Formula Regional Oceania Trophy	Hitech	14	1	0	0	6	272	6th
2026	GB3 Championship	Hitech	3	0	0	0	1	50	21st
2026	FIA Formula 3 Championship	ART Grand Prix	19	0	0	0	1	30	20th
2027	FIA Formula 3 Championship	Hitech	0	0	0	0	0	0	TBD

^{*} Season still in progress.

=== Complete Ginetta Junior Championship results ===
(key) (Races in bold indicate pole position) (Races in italics indicate fastest lap)

Year	Entrant	1	2	3	4	5	6	7	8	9	10	11	12	13	14	15	16	17	18	19	20	21	22	23	24	25	Pos	Points
2022	Elite Motorsport	DON; 1; 7	DON; 2; 7	DON; 3; 8	BHI; 1; 1	BHI; 2; 15	BHI; 3; 9	THR1; 1 Ret	THR1; 2 Ret	CRO; 1; 8	CRO; 2; 4	KNO; 1; 9	KNO; 2; 13	KNO; 3; 11	SNE; 1; 9	SNE; 2; 1	SNE; 3; 5	**THR2**; **1**; 17	THR2; 2; 7	THR2; 3; 12	SIL; 1; 2	SIL; 2; 5	SIL; 3; 3	BHGP; 1 Ret	BHGP; 2; 7	BHGP; 3; 3	7th	380

=== Complete Formula 4 UAE Championship results ===
(key) (Races in bold indicate pole position) (Races in italics indicate fastest lap)

Year	Entrant	1	2	3	4	5	6	7	8	9	10	11	12	13	14	15	Pos	Points
2023	Hitech Pulse-Eight	DUB1; 1; 13	DUB1; 2; 16	DUB1; 3; 14	KMT1; 1; 7	KMT1; 2 Ret	KMT1; 3; 9	KMT2; 1; 8	KMT2; 2; 22	KMT2; 3; 17	DUB2; 1; 7	DUB2; 2; 8	DUB2; 3; 11	YMC; 1; 12	YMC; 2; 15	YMC; 3; 29	17th	22

=== Complete F4 British Championship results ===
(key) (Races in bold indicate pole position; races in italics indicate fastest lap; ^{superscript} indicates points for positions gained)

Year	Entrant	1	2	3	4	5	6	7	8	9	10	11	12	13	14	15	16	17	18	19	20	21	22	23	24	25	26	27	28	29	30	31	Pos	Points
2023	Hitech Pulse-Eight	DPN; 1; 9	DPN; 2; 4^{7}	DPN; 3; 16	BHI; 1; 1	BHI; 2; 11^{4}	BHI; 3; 8	SNE; 1 C	SNE; 2; 12^{8}	SNE; 3; 2	THR; 1; 6	THR; 2; 5^{10}	THR; 3; 21	OUL; 1; 1	OUL; 2; 14^{7}	OUL; 3; 20	SIL; 1; 15	SIL; 2; 17	SIL; 3; 6	CRO; 1; 9	CRO; 2; 14	CRO; 3; 6	KNO; 1; 15	KNO; 2; 10^{4}	KNO; 3; 3	DPGP; 1; 8	DPGP; 2; 8	DPGP; 3; 13	DPGP; 4; 9	BHGP; 1; 5	BHGP; 2; 8^{1}	BHGP; 3; 12	7th	195

=== Complete Formula Regional Middle East Championship results ===
(key) (Races in bold indicate pole position) (Races in italics indicate fastest lap)

Year	Entrant	1	2	3	4	5	6	7	8	9	10	11	12	13	14	15	Pos	Points
2024	R-ace GP	YMC1; 1	YMC1; 2	YMC1; 3	YMC2; 1	YMC2; 2	YMC2; 3	DUB1; 1	DUB1; 2	DUB1; 3	YMC3; 1; 19	YMC3; 2 Ret	YMC3; 3 Ret	DUB2; 1; 11	DUB2; 2; 10	DUB2; 3; 13	22nd	1
2025	ART Grand Prix	YMC1; 1; 9	YMC1; 2; 1	YMC1; 3; 13	YMC2; 1; 14	YMC2; 2; 9	YMC2; 3; 7	DUB; 1; 6	DUB; 2; 10	DUB; 3 Ret	YMC3; 1; 4	YMC3; 2; 4	YMC3; 3; 15	LUS; 1; 5	LUS; 2; 8	LUS; 3; 5	8th	119

=== Complete Formula Regional European Championship results ===
(key) (Races in bold indicate pole position) (Races in italics indicate fastest lap)

Year	Entrant	1	2	3	4	5	6	7	8	9	10	11	12	13	14	15	16	17	18	19	20	Pos	Points
2024	G4 Racing	HOC; 1; 19	HOC; 2 Ret	SPA; 1; 20	SPA; 2; 20	ZAN; 1; 12	ZAN; 2; 15	HUN; 1; 16	HUN; 2; 16	MUG; 1; 17	MUG; 2; 19	LEC; 1; 17	LEC; 2; 3	IMO; 1; 16	IMO; 2 Ret	RBR; 1; 19	RBR; 2; 15	CAT; 1; 14	CAT; 2; 5	MNZ; 1; 16	MNZ; 2; 9	18th	27
2025	ART Grand Prix	MIS; 1; 11	MIS; 2; 16	SPA; 1; 9	SPA; 2; 4	ZAN; 1; 12	ZAN; 2; 12	HUN; 1; 11	HUN; 2; 6	LEC; 1 Ret	LEC; 2; 11	IMO; 1; 9	IMO; 2; 19	RBR; 1; 18	RBR; 2; 16	CAT; 1; 10	CAT; 2; 10	HOC; 1; 10	HOC; 2; 9	MNZ; 1; 14	MNZ; 2; 19	14th	30

=== Complete GB3 Championship results ===
(key) (Races in bold indicate pole position; races in italics indicate fastest lap; ^{superscript} indicates points for positions gained)

Year	Entrant	1	2	3	4	5	6	7	8	9	10	11	12	13	14	15	16	17	18	19	20	21	22	23	24	Pos	Points
2024	Chris Dittmann Racing	OUL; 1	OUL; 2	OUL; 3	SIL1; 1	SIL1; 2	SIL1; 3	SPA; 1; 12	SPA; 2; 6	SPA; 3; 5^{9}	HUN; 1	HUN; 2	HUN; 3	ZAN; 1	ZAN; 2	ZAN; 3	SIL2; 1	SIL2; 2	SIL2; 3	DON; 1	DON; 2	DON; 3	BRH; 1	BRH; 2	BRH; 3	23rd	46
2025	Hillspeed	SIL1; 1; 13	SIL1; 2; 9	SIL1; 3; 8^{5}	ZAN; 1	ZAN; 2	ZAN; 3	SPA; 1; 3	**SPA**; **2**; 1	SPA; 3; 2^{10}	HUN; 1	HUN; 2	HUN; 3	SIL2; 1	SIL2; 2	SIL2; 3	BRH; 1; 17	BRH; 2; 8	BRH; 3; 7	DON; 1	DON; 2	DON; 3	MNZ; 1	MNZ; 2	MNZ; 3	14th	145
2026	Hitech	SIL1; 1	SIL1; 2	SIL1; 3	SPA; 1	SPA; 2	SPA; 3	HUN; 1	HUN; 2	HUN; 3	RBR; 1	RBR; 2	RBR; 3	SIL2; 1	SIL2; 2	SIL2; 3	DON; 1	DON; 2	DON; 3	BRH; 1; 4	BRH; 2; 9	BRH; 3; 3^{2}	CAT; 1	CAT; 2	CAT; 3	21st	50

=== Complete Macau Grand Prix results ===
Year	Team	Car	Qualifying	Quali Race	Main Race
2024	(France) ART Grand Prix	Tatuus F3 T-318	27th	19th	DNF
2025	(France) ART Grand Prix	Tatuus F3 T-318	22nd	15th	11th

=== Complete Formula Regional Oceania Trophy results ===
(key) (Races in bold indicate pole position) (Races in italics indicate fastest lap)

Year	Entrant	1	2	3	4	5	6	7	8	9	10	11	12	13	14	15	16	Pos	Points
2026	Hitech	HMP; 1; 3	HMP; 2; 14	HMP; 3; 2	HMP; 4; 3	TAU; 1; 8	TAU; 2; 7	TAU; 3; 7	TAU; 4; 2	TER; 1; 4	TER; 2; 16	TER; 3 C	TER; 4 DNS	HIG; 1; 4	HIG; 2; 8	HIG; 3; 1	HIG; 4; 3	6th	272

=== Complete FIA Formula 3 Championship results ===
(key) (Races in bold indicate pole position; races in italics indicate points for the fastest lap of the top-10 finishers)

Year	Entrant	1	2	3	4	5	6	7	8	9	10	11	12	13	14	15	16	17	18	19	20	Pos	Points
2026	ART Grand Prix	MEL; SPR; 28	MEL; FEA; Ret	MON; SPR; 9	MON; FEA; 17	CAT; SPR; 14	CAT; FEA; 13	RBR; SPR; DSQ	RBR; FEA; 10	SIL; SPR; 16	SIL; FEA; 6	SPA; SPR; 18	SPA; FEA; 23	HUN; SPR; 2	HUN; FEA; Ret	MNZ; SPR; 24†	MNZ; FEA; 5	MAD; SPR; 24	MAD; FEA1; 13	MAD; FEA2; 19		20th	30
2027	Hitech	BHR; SPR	BHR; FEA	JED; SPR	JED; FEA	MEL; SPR	MEL; FEA	MTL; SPR	MTL; FEA	MON; SPR	MON; FEA	SIL; SPR	SIL; FEA	RBR; SPR	RBR; FEA	MNZ; SPR	MNZ; FEA	MAD; SPR	MAD; FEA	IST; SPR	IST; FEA	TBD	TBD
