= Liam McNeilly =

British racing driver (born 2006)

- McNeilly competing in the 2026 Porsche Supercup round at Circuit Zandvoort
- Nationality: (United Kingdom) British
- Born: Liam Edward McNeilly; April 19, 2006 (age 20) London, United Kingdom

Porsche Supercup career
- Debut season: 2026
- Current team: Ombra Racing
- Car number: 18
- Starts: 0
- Wins: 0
- Podiums: 0
- Poles: 0
- Fastest laps: 0
- Best finish: TBD in 2026

Previous series
- 2025 2025 2024–2025 2024 2023–2024 2020–2022: USF Pro 2000 Championship; GB3 Championship; USF2000 Championship; USF Juniors; GB4 Championship; Ginetta Junior Championship

Liam Edward McNeilly (born 19 April 2006) is a British racing driver who is set to compete in the Porsche Supercup with Ombra Racing. He previously competed in the USF2000 Championship with Jay Howard Driver Development and the GB3 Championship with Fortec Motorsport.

McNeilly finished second in the 2024 USF Juniors championship driving for Jay Howard Driver Development.

== Career ==
=== USF2000 ===
For 2025, McNeilly joined USF2000, driving for Jay Howard Driver Development. He began the season in perfect form, winning both races in St. Petersburg and all three races at NOLA. However, he was unable to compete in the third round at Indianapolis as he faced visa issues when trying to enter the country. He lost the lead of the championship, two points behind Jack Jeffers.

=== GB3 Championship ===
In 2025, McNeilly made his debut in 2025 GB3 Championship with Fortec Motorsport during the penultimate round in Donington Park.

== Racing record ==
=== Career summary ===
Season	Series	Team	Races	Wins	Poles	F/Laps	Podiums	Points	Position
2020	Ginetta Junior Championship	Fox Motorsport	21	0	0	0	0	136	16th
2021	Ginetta Junior Championship	Fox Motorsport	25	5	4	3	12	608	**2nd**
2022	Ginetta Junior Championship	Fox Motorsport	25	2	2	3	8	514	**3rd**
2023	GB4 Championship	Fox Motorsport	20	2	0	4	10	419	**3rd**
2024	USF Juniors	Jay Howard Driver Development	16	5	5	3	8	324	**2nd**
2024	USF2000 Championship	Jay Howard Driver Development	2	0	1	0	1	34	23rd
2024	GB4 Championship	Fox Motorsport	3	0	0	1	2	66	16th
2025	USF2000 Championship	Jay Howard Driver Development	5	5	4	4	5	163	14th
2025	USF Pro 2000 Championship	Jay Howard Driver Development	2	0	0	0	0	36	22nd
2025	GB3 Championship	Fortec Motorsport	3	0	0	0	1	23	31st
2026	Porsche Supercup	Ombra Racing	8	0	0	0	0	32.5	15th

* Season still in progress.

=== Complete Ginetta Junior Championship results ===
(key) (Races in bold indicate pole position) (Races in italics indicate fastest lap)

Year	Team	1	2	3	4	5	6	7	8	9	10	11	12	13	14	15	16	17	18	19	20	21	22	23	24	25	26	DC	Points
2020	Fox Motorsport	DON; 1; 14	DON; 2; 14	DON; 3; 12	BHGP; 1; 15	BHGP; 2; 19	BHGP; 3; 11	KNO; 1; 8	KNO; 2; 13	KNO; 3; 8	THR; 1; 17	THR; 2 Ret	SIL; 1; 14	SIL; 2; 13	SIL; 3 Ret	CRO; 1; 16	CRO; 2; 13	SNE; 1; 11	SNE; 2; 14	SNE; 3; 11	BHI; 1 Ret	BHI; 2 Ret						16th	136
2021	Fox Motorsport	THR; 1; 10	THR; 2; 10	SNE; 1; 3	**SNE**; **2**; 1	SNE; 3; 2	BHI; 1; 2	BHI; 2; 6	BHI; 3; 7	OUL; 1; 1	OUL; 2 C	**KNO**; **1**; 1	KNO; 2; 3	**KNO**; **3**; 4	KNO; 4; 4	THR; 1; 3	THR; 2; 4	THR; 3; 7	SIL; 1; 6	SIL; 2; 7	SIL; 3; 5	DON; 1; 1	**DON**; **2**; 2	DON; 3; 2	BHGP; 1; 5	BHGP; 2; 2	BHGP; 3; 1	2nd	608
2022	Fox Motorsport	DON; 1; 9	DON; 2; 6	DON; 3; 5	BHI; 1; 9	BHI; 2; 8	BHI; 3; 7	THR1; 1 Ret	THR1; 2; 7	CRO; 1; 5	CRO; 2; 6	KNO; 1; 5	KNO; 2; 3	KNO; 3; 2	**SNE**; **1**; 2	SNE; 2; 2	SNE; 3; 6	THR2; 1; 4	THR2; 2; 4	THR2; 3; 6	SIL; 1; 3	SIL; 2; 12	SIL; 3; 6	**BHGP**; **1**; 1	BHGP; 2; 1	BHGP; 3; 2		3rd	514

=== Complete GB4 Championship results ===
(key) (Races in bold indicate pole position) (Races in italics indicate fastest lap)

Year	Entrant	1	2	3	4	5	6	7	8	9	10	11	12	13	14	15	16	17	18	19	20	21	22	DC	Points
2023	Fox Motorsport	OUL; 1; 6	OUL; 2; 2	OUL; 3; 1^{8}	SIL1; 1 C	SIL1; 2; 7	SIL1; 3; 5^{2}	DON1; 1; 6	DON1; 2; 4	DON1; 3; 8	DON1; 4; 1^{7}	SNE; 1; 5	SNE; 2; 4	SNE; 3; 10	SIL2; 1; 2	SIL2; 2; 3	SIL2; 3 C	BRH; 1; 2	BRH; 2; 3	BRH; 3; 3^{7}	DON2; 1; 2	DON2; 2; 3	DON2; 3; 7^{3}	3rd	419
2024	Fox Motorsport	OUL; 1	OUL; 2	OUL; 3	SIL1; 1	SIL1; 2	SIL1; 3	DON1; 1; 3	DON1; 2; 2	DON1; 3; 8^{5}	SNE; 1	SNE; 2	SNE; 3	SIL2; 1	SIL2; 2	SIL2; 3	DON2; 1	DON2; 2	DON2; 3	BRH; 1	BRH; 2	BRH; 3		16th	66

=== Complete GB3 Championship results ===
(key) (Races in bold indicate pole position) (Races in italics indicate fastest lap)

Year	Team	1	2	3	4	5	6	7	8	9	10	11	12	13	14	15	16	17	18	19	20	21	22	23	24	DC	Points
2025	Fortec Motorsports	SIL1; 1	SIL1; 2	SIL1; 3	ZAN; 1	ZAN; 2	ZAN; 3	SPA; 1	SPA; 2	SPA; 3	HUN; 1	HUN; 2	HUN; 3	SIL2; 1	SIL2; 2	SIL2; 3	BRH; 1	BRH; 2	BRH; 3	DON; 1 Ret	DON; 2; 13	DON; 3; 3	MNZ; 1	MNZ; 2	MNZ; 3	31st	23

* Season still in progress.

=== American open-wheel racing results ===
==== USF Juniors ====
(key) (Races in bold indicate pole position) (Races in italics indicate fastest lap) (Races with * indicate most race laps led)

Year	Team	1	2	3	4	5	6	7	8	9	10	11	12	13	14	15	16	Rank	Points
2024	Jay Howard Driver Development	**NOL**; **1**; 2	NOL; 2; 1*	**NOL**; **3**; 3	ALA; 1; 4	ALA; 2; 24	VIR; 1; 7	VIR; 2; 12*	VIR; 3; 4	**MOH**; **1**; 3*	**MOH**; **2**; 1*	ROA; 1; 14	ROA; 2; 17	ROA; 3; 4	POR; 1; 1	**POR**; **2**; 1*	POR; 3; 1	2nd	324

==== USF2000 Championship ====
(key) (Races in bold indicate pole position) (Races in italics indicate fastest lap) (Races with * indicate most race laps led)

Year	Team	1	2	3	4	5	6	7	8	9	10	11	12	13	14	15	16	17	18	Rank	Points
2024	Jay Howard Driver Development	STP; 1	STP; 2	NOL; 1	NOL; 2	NOL; 3	IMS; 1	IMS; 2	IRP	ROA; 1	ROA; 2	MOH; 1	MOH; 2	MOH; 3	TOR; 1; 13	**TOR**; **2**; 2	POR; 1	POR; 2	POR; 3	23rd	34
2025	Jay Howard Driver Development	STP; 1; 1*	**STP**; **2**; 1*	**NOL**; **1**; 1*	**NOL**; **2**; 1*	**NOL**; **3**; 1*	IMS; 1 Wth	IMS; 2 Wth	IRP	ROA; 1	ROA; 2	MOH; 1	MOH; 2	MOH; 3	TOR; 1	TOR; 2	POR; 1	POR; 2	POR; 3	14th	163

==== USF Pro 2000 Championship ====
(key) (Races in bold indicate pole position) (Races in italics indicate fastest lap)

Year	Team	1	2	3	4	5	6	7	8	9	10	11	12	13	14	15	16	17	18	Position	Points
2025	Jay Howard Driver Development	STP; 1	STP; 2	LOU; 1	LOU; 2	LOU; 3	IMS; 1	IMS; 2	IMS; 3	IRP	ROA; 1	ROA; 2	ROA; 3	MOH; 1	MOH; 2	TOR; 1; 5	TOR; 2; 4	POR; 1	POR; 2	22nd	36
