= William Macintyre =

British racing driver (born 2007)

Will Macintyre
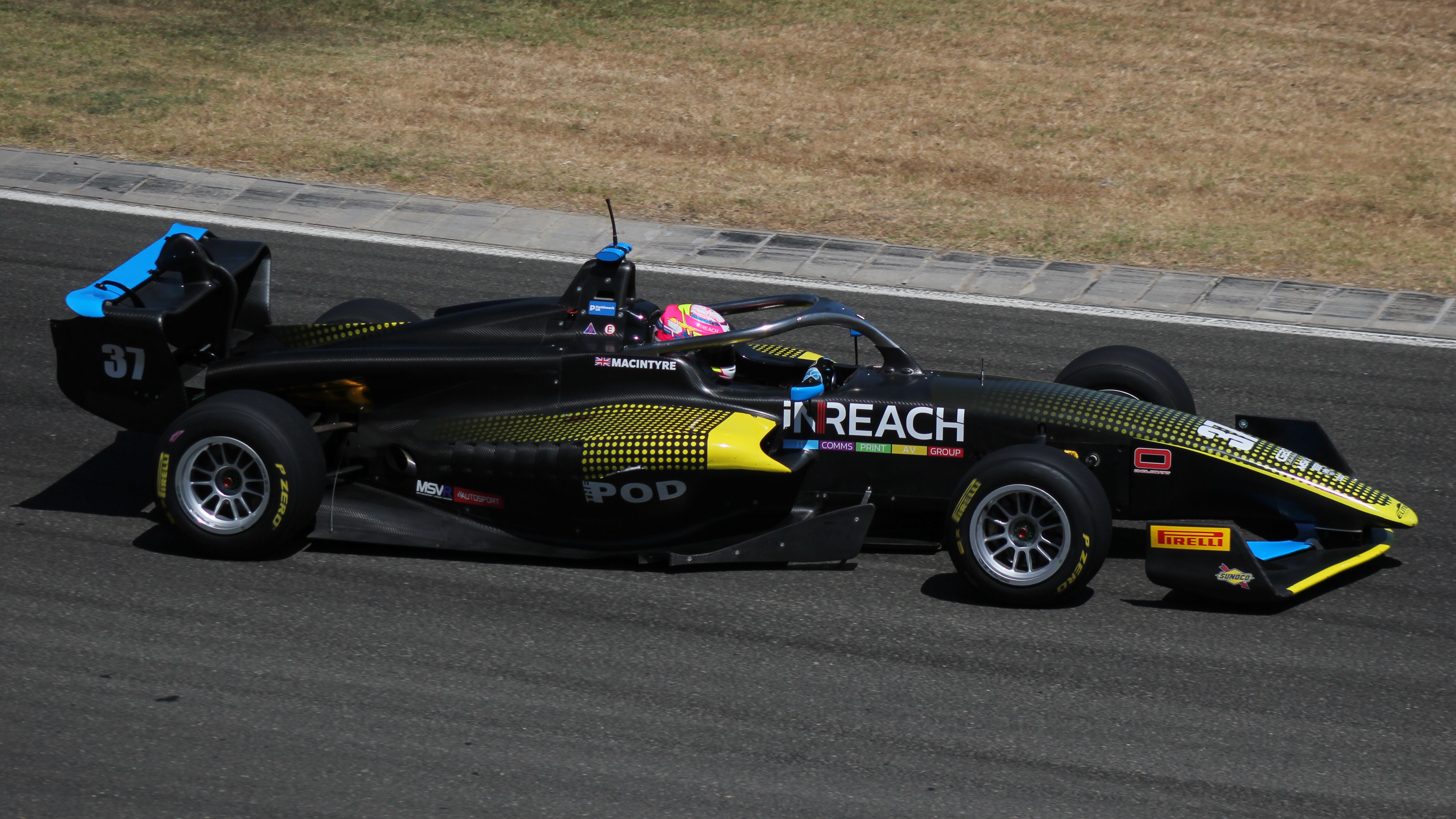
- Macintyre at the Hungaroring in 2025
- Nationality: United Kingdom
- Born: 14 August 2007 (age 19) Nash, Buckinghamshire, England

GB3 Championship career
- Debut season: 2024
- Car number: 37
- Former teams: Elite Motorsport; Hitech Pulse-Eight
- Starts: 41 (42 entries)
- Wins: 4
- Podiums: 9
- Poles: 0
- Fastest laps: 4
- Best finish: 5th in 2024

Previous series
- 2024-2025 2023 2023 2022 2022: GB3; F4 British; F4 UAE; GB4; Ginetta Junior

William Macintyre (born 14 August 2007) is a British former racing driver who most recently competed in the 2025 GB3 Championship for Elite Motorsport. He was diagnosed with cancer in September 2025 which put his racing career to a standstill as it is to April 2026. Macintyre is the 2023 British F4 vice-champion and the 2022 Ginetta Junior Championship runner-up.

== Early life ==
Macinytre was born in Nash, Buckinghamshire on 14 August 2007 and lived in Norfolk.

== Career ==
=== Karting ===
Macintyre began karting at the age of eight. He has had some consistent karting results, although never competing in the OK category due to moving straight to cars at the age of fourteen. His best karting result was in 2019, winning the Italian Championship in the 60 Mini category.

Macintyre is a former member of the Sauber Karting Team.

=== Ginetta Junior Championship ===
For 2022, Macintyre was confirmed to be competing in the Ginetta Junior Championship following a decorated karting career. Over the course of the season, Macintyre fought for the title with Josh Rowledge, eventually losing out to Rowledge in the final round of the season at Brands Hatch. Macintyre finished second in the championship, and was the highest placed rookie.

=== Formula 4 ===
Macintyre made his single seater debut during the 2022 GB4 Championship finale. He finished second in during races two and three. Macintyre competed in the 2023 Formula 4 UAE Championship with Hitech GP. In November 2022, it was announced that Macintyre would race in the 2023 F4 British Championship, continuing with Hitech. He obtained two second places during the second round of the season at Brands Hatch. His first win came at Thruxton in June, with the second coming at Knockhill in August. Macintyre ended the season in second place in the championship, just 13 points shy of champion Louis Sharp of Rodin Carlin.

=== GB3 Championship ===
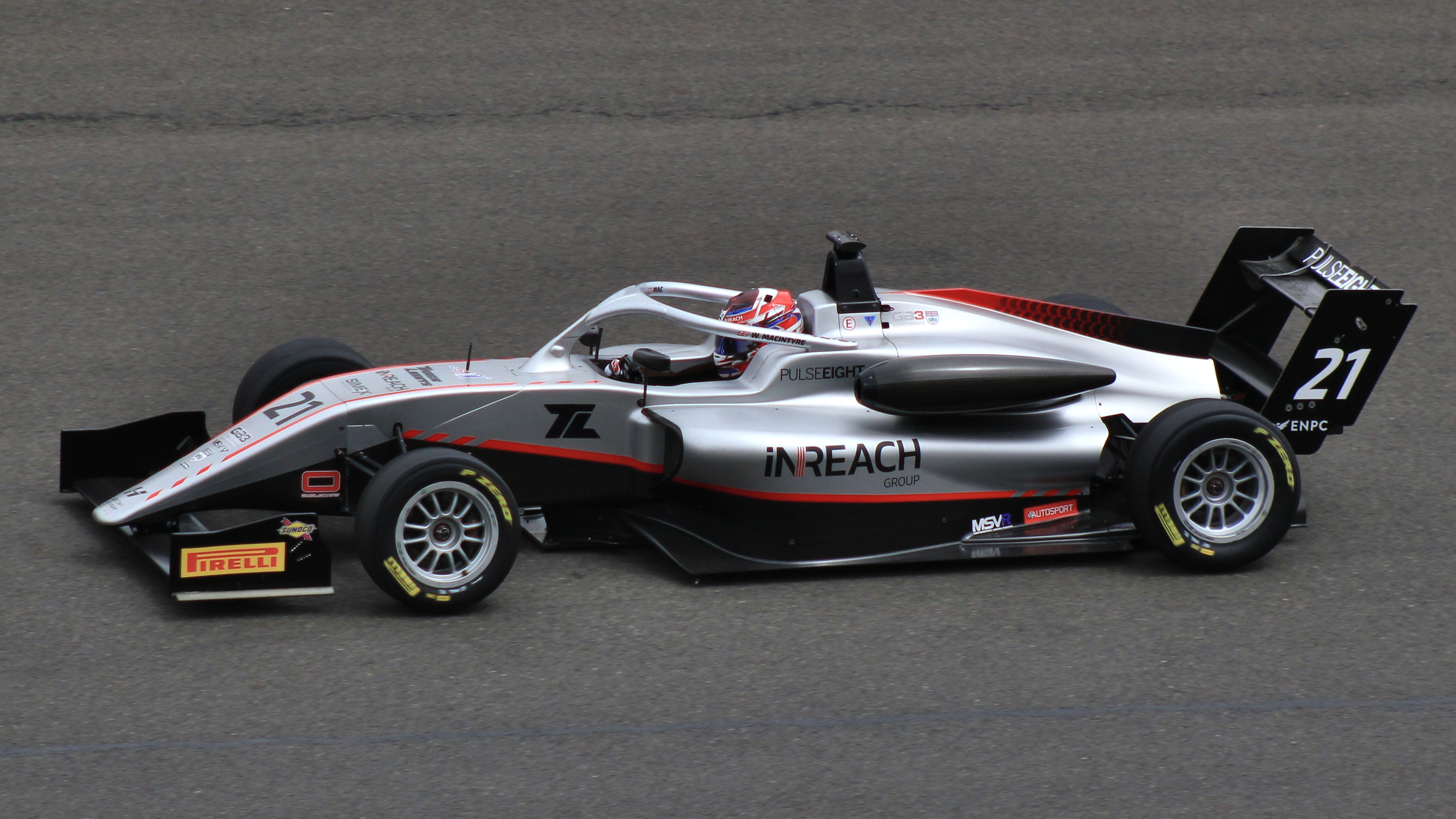
Macintyre at 2024 Hungary GB3 Round at the Hungaroring

After Macintyre's successes in F4, he moved up to Hitech's GB3 team to become one of their three drivers for the 2024 season. During his debut round at Oulton Park, Macintyre won the reverse-grid race three after making numerous overtakes and the race leader's retirement on the final lap. At the next round at Silverstone Circuit, Macintyre finished on the podium in third for race one, and took his second victory of the season during race three after battling with Ugo Ugochukwu. He claimed another win during a chaotic reverse-grid race three at Circuit de Spa-Francorchamps. Macintyre finished in second during race two at the Hungaroring, but was promoted to second after second place finisher Tymek Kucharczyk was disqualified. He finished in third during race three at Donington Park. He finished the season in fifth, securing a total of three wins, six podiums, and 376 points.

For his 2025 campaign, Macintyre switched to Elite Motorsport for his second GB3 campaign. He won the reverse-grid race three during the first round at Silverstone over Hitech's Keanu Al Azhari. After taking the lead on the first lap, Macintyre finished in second during race three at Zandvoort behind Hugo Schwarze. He finished in second during race one at the Hungaroring.

==== Cancer diagnosis ====
In September 2025, Macintyre announced that he is ending his season prematurely following diagnoses of lung and brain cancer. He is receiving treatment at Milton Keynes Hospital, and has received support from numerous high profile individuals and drivers involved in motorsport including Max Verstappen, Kimi Antonelli, Susie Wolff, Bianca Bustamante, Gianmarco Pradel and Alex Ninovic. Every GB3 car from the Donington Park GB3 round the next round after Macintyre's announcement carried a #TeamWill37 sticker just behind the halo which the cars would carried to the end of the season. Freddie Slater also carried the sticker during the 2025 Macau Grand Prix.

== Karting record ==
=== Karting career summary ===
Season	Series	Team	Position
2017	Super 1 National Championship - IAME Cadet		8th
2017	LGM Series - IAME Cadet		8th
2018	SKUSA SuperNationals - Mini Swift		6th
2018	Kartmasters British Grand Prix - IAME Cadet	Fusion Motorsport	4th
2018	LGM Series - IAME Cadet		10th
2018	IAME International Final - X30 Mini		4th
2018	MSA British Kart Championship - IAME Cadet		
2019	WSK Super Master Series - 60 Mini	Tony Kart	10th
2019	WSK Euro Series - 60 Mini	Team Driver Racing Kart	3rd
2019	Andrea Margutti Trophy - 60 Mini	Team Driver Racing Kart	4th
2019	IAME Euro Series - X30 Mini	Team Driver Racing Kart	29th
2019	Italian Championship - 60 Mini		1st
2020	WSK Super Master Series - OKJ	Sodikart	59th
2020	South Garda Winter Cup - OKJ	Sodikart	29th
2020	Champions of the Future - OKJ	Sodikart	46th
2020	WSK Euro Series - OKJ	Birel ART	37th
2020	ROK Cup International Final - Junior Rok	Birel ART	NC
2020	International IAME Games - X30 Junior	Kosmic	9th
2020	Rotax Max Challenge International Trophy - Rotax Junior	Kosmic	3rd
2020	Rotax Max Euro Trophy - Rotax Junior	Sodi Vitesse	17th
2020	IAME Euro Series - X30 Junior		7th
2021	IAME Winter Cup - X30 Junior	Kosmic	3rd
2021	IAME Euro Series - X30 Junior	Kosmic	7th
2021	WSK Euro Series - OKJ	Birel ART	9th
2021	WSK Super Master Series - OKJ	Birel ART	15th
2021	CIK-FIA European Championship - OKJ	Birel ART	14th
2021	Champions of the Future - OKJ	Birel ART	32nd
2021	WSK Open Cup - OKJ	Birel ART	24th

== Racing record ==
=== Racing career summary ===
Season	Series	Team	Races	Wins	Poles	F/Laps	Podiums	Points	Position
2022	Ginetta Junior Championship	Elite Motorsport	25	6	1	2	15	611	**2nd**
2022	GB4 Championship	Elite Motorsport	3	0	0	1	2	71	13th
2023	Formula 4 UAE Championship	Hitech Grand Prix	15	0	0	0	0	28	14th
2023	F4 British Championship	Hitech Pulse-Eight	31	2	3	3	14	371	**2nd**
2024	GB3 Championship	Hitech Pulse-Eight	23	3	0	3	6	372	5th
2025	GB3 Championship	Elite Motorsport	18	1	0	1	3	240	9th

=== Complete Ginetta Junior Championship results ===
(key) (Races in bold indicate pole position) (Races in italics indicate fastest lap)

Year	Team	1	2	3	4	5	6	7	8	9	10	11	12	13	14	15	16	17	18	19	20	21	22	23	24	25	DC	Points
2022	Elite Motorsport	DON; 1; 8	DON; 2; 5	DON; 3; 4	BHI; 1; 2	BHI; 2; 1	BHI; 3; 3	**THR1**; **1**; 2	THR1; 2; 6	CRO; 1; 2	CRO; 2; 1	KNO; 1; 11	KNO; 2; 5	KNO; 3; 3	SNE; 1; 1	SNE; 2; 10	SNE; 3; 2	THR2; 1; 1	THR2; 2; 3	THR2; 3; 4	SIL; 1; 11	SIL; 2; 3	SIL; 3; 1	BHGP; 1; 4	BHGP; 2; 2	BHGP; 3; 1	2nd	611

=== Complete Formula 4 UAE Championship results ===
(key) (Races in bold indicate pole position) (Races in italics indicate fastest lap)

Year	Team	1	2	3	4	5	6	7	8	9	10	11	12	13	14	15	Pos	Points
2023	Hitech Grand Prix	DUB1; 1; 32	DUB1; 2; 32	DUB1; 3; 13	KMT1; 1; 13	KMT1; 2; 9	KMT1; 3; 23	KMT2; 1; 29	KMT2; 2; 6	KMT2; 3; 13	DUB2; 1; 4	DUB2; 2; 31	DUB2; 3; 14	YMC; 1; 7	YMC; 2; 11	YMC; 3; 11	14th	28

=== Complete F4 British Championship results ===
(key) (Races in bold indicate pole position; races in italics indicate fastest lap)

Year	Team	1	2	3	4	5	6	7	8	9	10	11	12	13	14	15	16	17	18	19	20	21	22	23	24	25	26	27	28	29	30	31	DC	Points
2023	Hitech Pulse-Eight	DPN; 1; 6	DPN; 2; 20	DPN; 3; 5	BHI; 1; 2	BHI; 2; 13^{3}	BHI; 3; 2	SNE; 1 C	SNE; 2; 6^{10}	SNE; 3; 4	THR; 1; 2	THR; 2; 11^{10}	**THR**; **3**; 1	OUL; 1; 14	OUL; 2; 13^{3}	OUL; 3; 3	**SIL**; **1**; 2	SIL; 2; 5^{10}	SIL; 3; 2	CRO; 1; 3	CRO; 2; 15^{2}	CRO; 3; 2	**KNO**; **1**; 1	KNO; 2; 17	KNO; 3; 2	DPGP; 1; 9	DPGP; 2; 6	DPGP; 3; 2^{7}	DPGP; 4; 4	BHGP; 1; 3	BHGP; 2; 7^{9}	BHGP; 3; 3	2nd	371

=== Complete GB3 Championship results ===
(key) (Races in bold indicate pole position) (Races in italics indicate fastest lap)

Year	Team	1	2	3	4	5	6	7	8	9	10	11	12	13	14	15	16	17	18	19	20	21	22	23	24	DC	Points
2024	Hitech Pulse-Eight	OUL; 1; 9	OUL; 2; 6	OUL; 3; 1^{4}	SIL1; 1; 3	SIL1; 2; 1	SIL1; 3 C	SPA; 1; 5	SPA; 2; 5	SPA; 3; 1^{4}	HUN; 1; 5	HUN; 2; 2	HUN; 3; 8^{1}	ZAN; 1; 5	ZAN; 2 Ret	ZAN; 3; 5^{2}	SIL2; 1; 13	SIL2; 2; 16	SIL2; 3; 10^{8}	DON; 1; 7	DON; 2; 9	DON; 3; 3^{2}	BRH; 1; 5	BRH; 2; 15	BRH; 3; 5^{2}	5th	372
2025	Elite Motorsport	SIL1; 1; 8	SIL1; 2; 23	SIL1; 3; 1^{1}	ZAN; 1; 10	ZAN; 2; 9	ZAN; 3; 2	SPA; 1; 5	SPA; 2; 6	SPA; 3; 10	HUN; 1; 2	HUN; 2; 5	HUN; 3; 15	SIL2; 1; 5	SIL2; 2; 6	SIL2; 3; 9^{3}	BRH; 1; 5	BRH; 2; 11	BRH; 3 Ret	DON; 1	DON; 2	DON; 3	MNZ; 1	MNZ; 2	MNZ; 3	9th	240
