= Ella Lloyd =

British racing driver (born 2005)

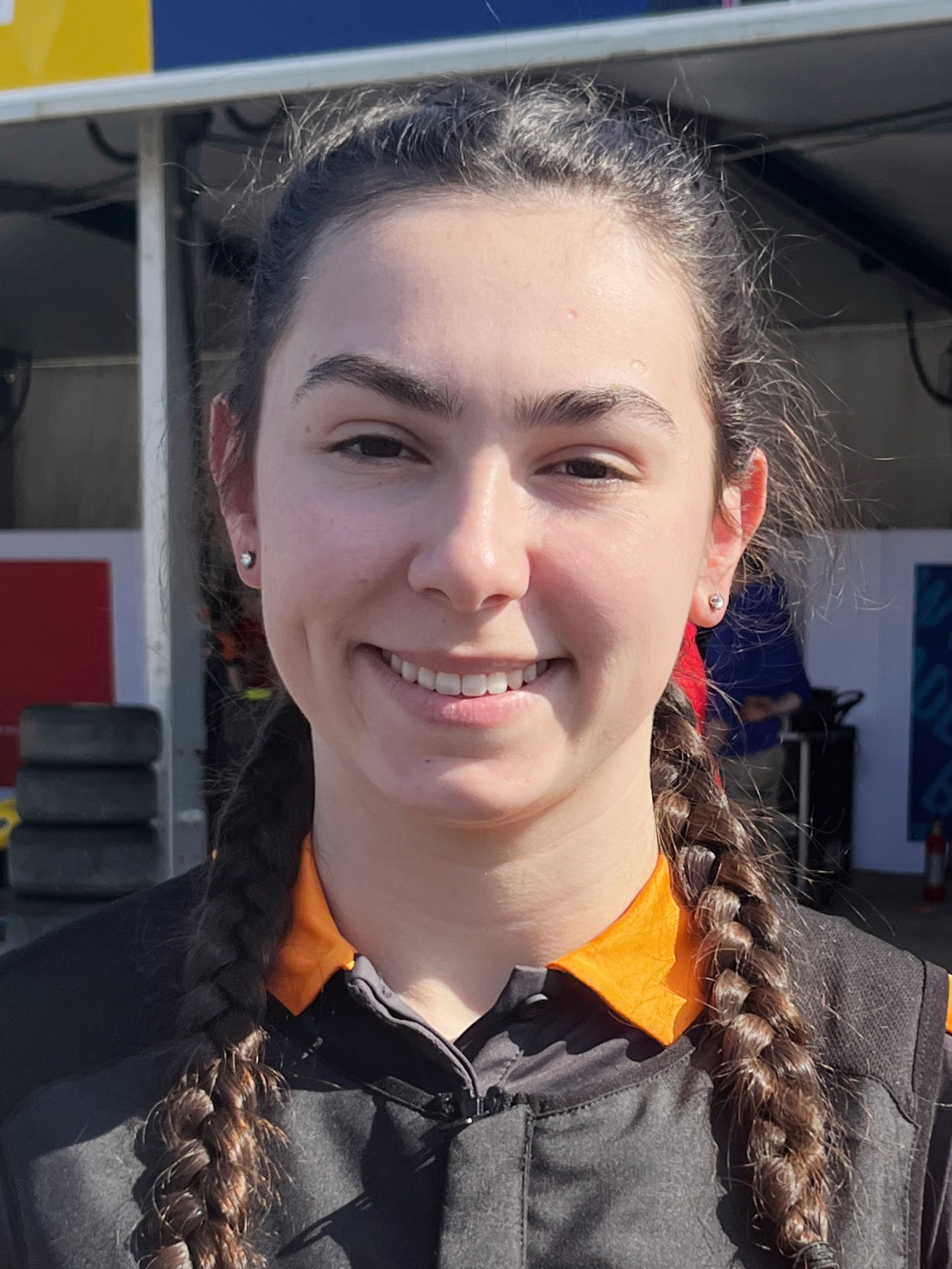
- Lloyd at the 2026 Chinese Grand Prix
- Nationality: (United Kingdom) British
- Born: Ella Mai Lloyd; 20 July 2005 (age 21) Pontypridd, Rhondda Cynon Taf, Wales

F4 British Championship career
- Debut season: 2024
- Current team: Rodin Motorsport
- Car number: 20
- Former teams: JHR Developments
- Starts: 53
- Wins: 0
- Podiums: 5
- Poles: 0
- Fastest laps: 0
- Best finish: 11th in 2024
- Statistics up to date as of 22 June 2026.

F1 Academy career
- Debut season: 2024
- Current team: Rodin Motorsport
- Car number: 20
- Former teams: Prema Racing
- Starts: 28
- Wins: 1
- Podiums: 6
- Poles: 0
- Fastest laps: 1
- Best finish: 4th in 2025

Previous series
- 2024; 2024; 2022–2023; 2022: Formula Winter Series; Formula Trophy UAE; Ginetta GT5 Challenge; Ginetta Junior
- Statistics up to date as of 13 November 2026.

Ella Mai Lloyd (born 20 July 2005) is a British racing driver from Wales who competes in F1 Academy and the F4 British Championship for Rodin Motorsport as part of the McLaren Driver Development Programme.

Lloyd came fourth in the 2025 F1 Academy season and was also runner-up in the 2023 Ginetta GT5 Challenge.

== Career ==
=== Early career ===
Despite never competing in karting, Lloyd's first taste of motorsport came in 2018 when she was invited to take part in the FIA's Girls on Track Karting Challenge at Silverstone. She formally began her career four years later, in the 2022 Ginetta Junior Championship. Racing for Assetto Motorsport, she scored points in 15 of 25 races and recorded a best race finish of 11th.

In early 2023, Lloyd was chosen for the Motorsport UK Academy Futures program and moved up to the Ginetta GT5 Challenge with Xentek Motorsport. The season was an instant success, as she won on debut and picked up ten wins, ten pole positions and seventeen podiums, eventually finishing runner-up behind Luke Garlick.

=== Formula 4 ===
==== 2024 ====
Lloyd made her single-seater debut in the 2024 Formula Winter Series, driving for Rodin Motorsport in two rounds. In her debut weekend she had her best qualifying time deleted for causing a red flag, which meant she started in 38th. She made up more than 30 positions over the three races, finishing in 21st, 20th, and 22nd. She improved to 18th in qualifying for the next round, but weather and contact marred her results in the races. Lloyd won the female trophy in three of the four races she finished.

Lloyd later joined JHR Developments for a full programme in British F4. Her debut came at Donington Park, where she finished eighth and seventh having notably overtaken the much more experienced Abbi Pulling. Lloyd's campaign took off in the fifth round at Silverstone, with three strong results including a maiden podium, where she followed teammate Leo Robinson through for a JHR 1–2. The pair repeated the feat at Knockhill, and Lloyd also returned to the rostrum at Donington, where she qualified a season-best 3rd in wet conditions, and Brands Hatch. Despite skipping the penultimate round, Lloyd finished 11th in the championship with 99 points.

On the tail end of the 2024 season, Lloyd competed in the first two rounds of the 2024 Formula Trophy UAE, where she picked up two best finishes of 17th.

==== 2025 ====
Lloyd placed fourth upon her second season in F1 Academy additionally she returned to the British F4 in 2025, switching to Rodin Motorsport in a dual campaign with F1 Academy campaign.

=== F1 Academy ===
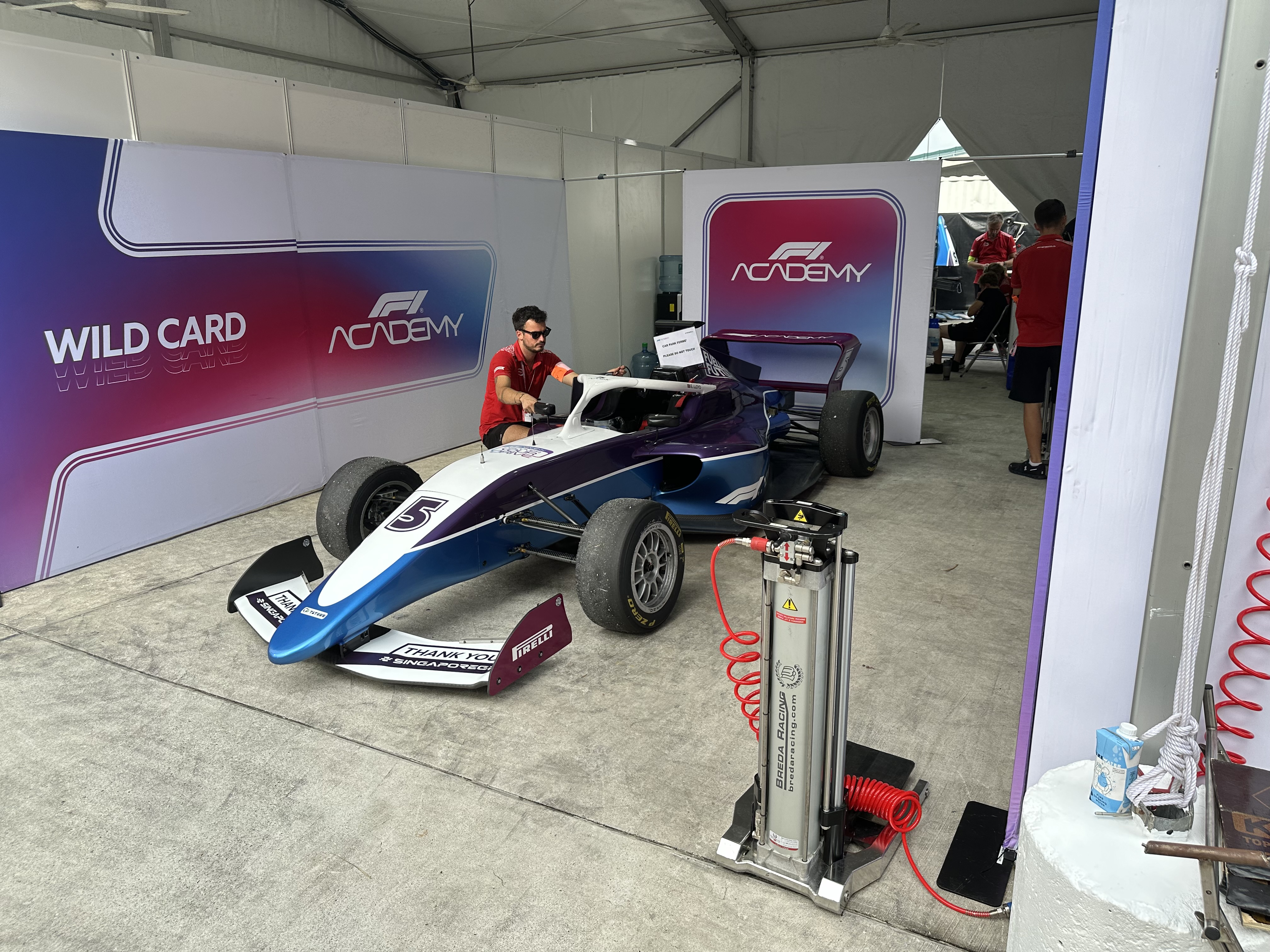
Lloyd's 2024 F1 Academy car in the paddock at the Marina Bay Street Circuit.

In 2024, along with her British F4 commitments, Lloyd served as the wildcard entry in Round 5 of the all-female F1 Academy series at Singapore. Although mechanical issues limited her mileage in practice, Lloyd qualified eighth, a mere 0.111 off fourth place. She improved to sixth and seventh in both races, but a penalty for a false start demoted her to ninth in Race 1.

For the 2025 season, it was announced that Lloyd would be entering the series under Rodin Motorsport with support from McLaren, having joined the McLaren Driver Development Programme. In Round 1 at Shanghai, Lloyd qualified 11th. Though starting at the pitlane for Race 1, she managed to climb her way up to sixth place, and in Race 2 she finished in seventh. In Round 2 at Jeddah, she won her first F1 Academy race in the reverse grid Race 1. In Round 4 at Montreal, she finished all three races in second place. Lloyd finished in fourth in the drivers' championship and was the top-scoring rookie of the season.

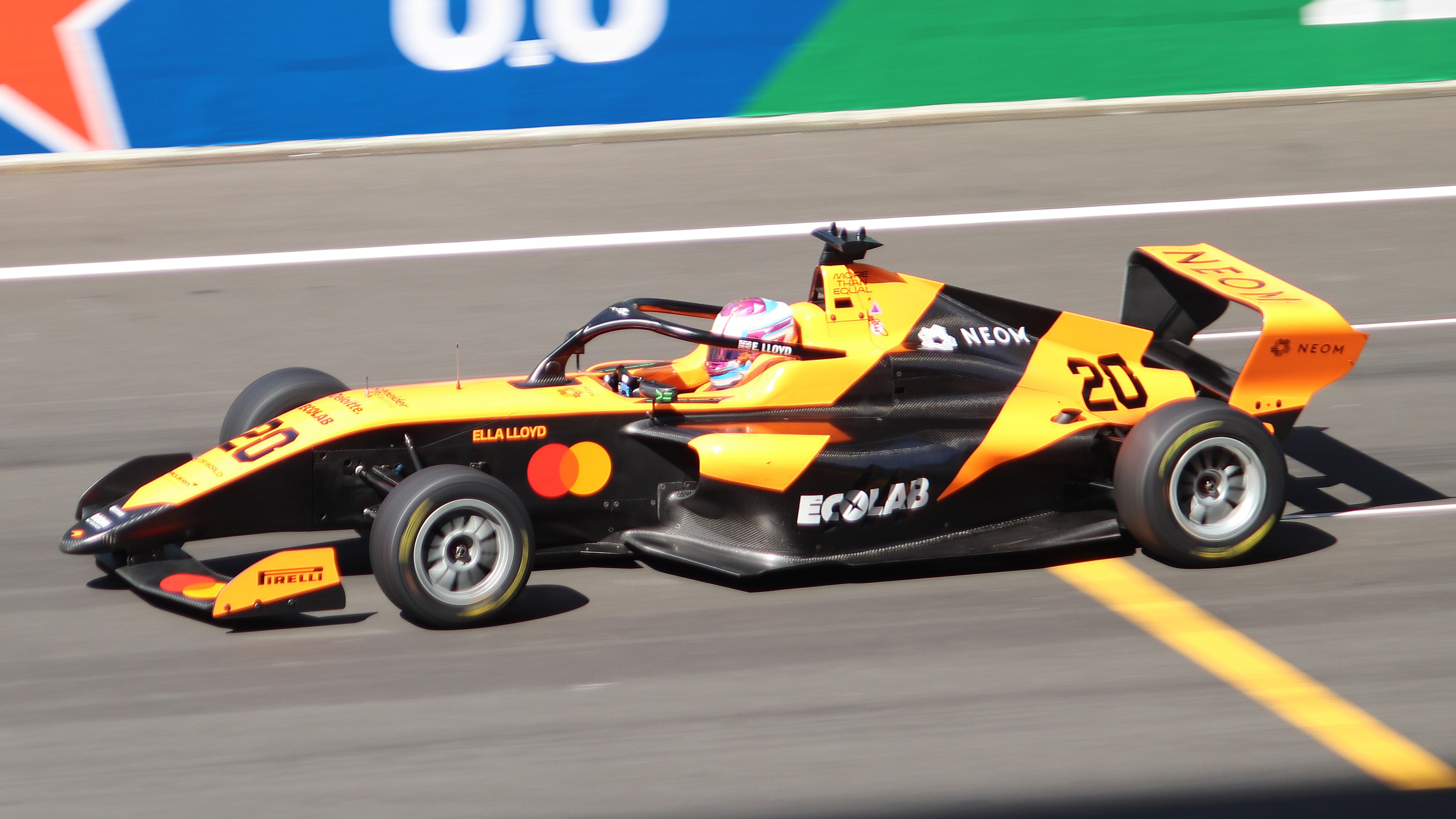
Lloyd driving at the 2026 F1 Academy Shanghai round

Lloyd remained with Rodin Motorsport and McLaren for the 2026 season. She won her first podium of the season when she came in third in Round 3 at Silverstone for the reverse grid race.

=== Formula E ===
In November 2024, Lloyd and McLaren's incumbent F1 Academy driver Bianca Bustamante joined the McLaren Formula E Team for the Formula E women's test that took place at Jarama in Madrid ahead of the 2024–25 season. Lloyd placed seventh overall at the test, a showing Gary Paffett described as "impressive". She participated in her second test session on 14 July 2025 again for McLaren at the Tempelhof Airport Street Circuit in Berlin. Ahead of the 2025–26 season, Lloyd was hired by Envision Racing for the women's test at Valencia, where she finished both the morning and afternoon sessions in fifth. Lloyd returned with Envision for the rookie test at Madrid.

== Personal life ==
Besides racing, Lloyd has also competed in skiing and show jumping. Her father, Chris Lloyd, is a former rally driver and competed in the 2018 Paralympics in alpine skiing.

Lloyd is managed by Greenlight Sports Management, an agency run by 2003 Le Mans winner Guy Smith and fellow sportscar racer Andy Meyrick.

== Racing record ==
=== Racing career summary ===
Season	Series	Team	Races	Wins	Poles	F/Laps	Podiums	Points	Position
2022	Ginetta Junior Championship	Assetto Motorsport	25	0	0	0	0	67	21st
2022	Ginetta GT5 Challenge - Pro	Xentek Motorsport	3	0	0	0	0	0	NC
2023	Ginetta GT5 Challenge - Pro	Xentek Motorsport	25	10	10	7	17	571	**2nd**
2024	Formula Winter Series	Rodin Motorsport	5	0	0	0	0	0	41st
2024	F4 British Championship	JHR Developments	26	0	0	0	4	99	11th
2024	F1 Academy	Prema Racing	2	0	0	0	0	8	18th
2024	Formula Trophy UAE	Xcel Motorsport	5	0	0	0	0	0	24th
2025	F1 Academy	Rodin Motorsport	14	1	0	0	5	109	4th
2025	F4 British Championship	Rodin Motorsport	21	0	0	0	1	52	14th
2026	F1 Academy	Rodin Motorsport	14	0	0	1	1	52	8th
2026	F4 British Championship	Rodin Motorsport	9	0	0	0	0	30	24th

* Season still in progress.

=== Complete Ginetta Junior Championship results ===
(key) (Races in bold indicate pole position) (Races in italics indicate fastest lap)

Year	Team	1	2	3	4	5	6	7	8	9	10	11	12	13	14	15	16	17	18	19	20	21	22	23	24	25	DC	Points
2022	Assetto Motorsport	DON; 1; 23	DON; 2 Ret	DON; 3; 20	BHI; 1; 21	BHI; 2; 16	BHI; 3; 20	THR1; 1; 18	THR1; 2 Ret	CRO; 1; 19	CRO; 2; 19	KNO; 1 Ret	KNO; 2; 16	KNO; 3; 16	SNE; 1 Ret	SNE; 2 Ret	SNE; 3; 17	THR2; 1; 14	THR2; 2; 11	THR2; 3 Ret	SIL; 1; 14	SIL; 2 Ret	SIL; 3 Ret	BHGP; 1; 13	BHGP; 2; 15	BHGP; 3; 13	21st	67

=== Complete Formula Winter Series results ===
(key) (Races in bold indicate pole position) (Races in italics indicate fastest lap)

Year	Team	1	2	3	4	5	6	7	8	9	10	11	12	DC	Points
2024	Rodin Motorsport	JER; 1	JER; 2	JER; 3	CRT; 1	CRT; 2	CRT; 3	ARA; 1; 21	ARA; 2; 20	ARA; 3; 22	CAT; 1 C	CAT; 2 Ret	CAT; 3; 26	41st	0

=== Complete F4 British Championship results ===
(key) (Races in bold indicate pole position) (Races in italics indicate fastest lap)

Year	Team	1	2	3	4	5	6	7	8	9	10	11	12	13	14	15	16	17	18	19	20	21	22	23	24	25	26	27	28	29	30	31	32	DC	Points
2024	JHR Developments	DPN; 1; 8	DPN; 2; 7	DPN; 3 C	BHI; 1 Ret	BHI; 2; 12^{9}	BHI; 3; 20	SNE; 1; 7	SNE; 2; 9	SNE; 3; 12	THR; 1; 10	THR; 2; 17^{1}	THR; 3; 15	SILGP; 1; 5	SILGP; 2; 2	SILGP; 3; 7	ZAN; 1; 12	ZAN; 2; 5	ZAN; 3; 7	KNO; 1 Ret	KNO; 2; 2	KNO; 3 DNS	DPGP; 1 Ret	DPGP; 2; 17	DPGP; 3; 3^{6}	DPGP; 4; 12	SILN; 1	SILN; 2	SILN; 3	BHGP; 1; 12	BHGP; 2	BHGP; 3; 2	BHGP; 3; 9	11th	99
2025	Rodin Motorsport	DPN; 1; 10	DPN; 2 Ret	DPN; 3 Ret	SILGP; 1	SILGP; 2	SILGP; 3	SNE; 1; 15	SNE; 2; 14	SNE; 3; 9	THR; 1 Ret	THR; 2; 11	THR; 3; 7	OUL; 1; 8	OUL; 2; 13^{5}	OUL; 3; 13	SILGP; 1; 24	SILGP; 2; 10	ZAN; 1; 7	ZAN; 2; 3^{2}	ZAN; 3; 4	KNO; 1; 14	KNO; 2; 11^{2}	KNO; 3 Ret	DPGP; 1	DPGP; 2	DPGP; 3	SILN; 1; 12	SILN; 2; 7	SILN; 3; 14	BHGP; 1	BHGP; 2	BHGP; 3	14th	52
2026	Rodin Motorsport	DPN; 1; 13	DPN; 2; 25	DPN; 3; 5	BHI; 1	BHI; 2	BHI; 3	SNE; 1	SNE; 2	SNE; 3	SILGP; 1; 25	SILGP; 2; 15^{10}	SILGP; 3 Ret	ZAN; 1; 23	ZAN; 2; 16^{10}	ZAN; 3; 26	THR; 1	THR; 2	THR; 3	DPGP; 1	DPGP; 2	DPGP; 3	CRO; 1	CRO; 2	CRO; 3	SILN; 1	SILN; 2	SILN; 3	BHGP; 1	BHGP; 2	BHGP; 3			24th	30

* Season still in progress.

=== Complete F1 Academy results ===
(key) (Races in bold indicate pole position; races in italics indicate fastest lap)

Year	Entrant	1	2	3	4	5	6	7	8	9	10	11	12	13	14	15	DC	Points
2024	Prema Racing	JED; 1	JED; 2	MIA; 1	MIA; 2	CAT; 1	CAT; 2	ZAN; 1	ZAN; 2	SIN; 1; 9	SIN; 2; 7	LSL; 1	LSL; 2	YMC; 1	YMC; 2	YMC; 3	18th	8
2025	Rodin Motorsport	SHA; 1; 6	SHA; 2; 7	JED; 1; 1	JED; 2; 8	MIA; 1 Ret	MIA; 2 C	MTL; 1; 2	MTL; 2; 2	MTL; 3; 2	ZAN; 1; 4	ZAN; 2; 4	SIN; 1; 7	SIN; 2; 3	LVG; 1 Ret	LVG; 2; 6	4th	109
2026	Rodin Motorsport	SHA; 1; 7	SHA; 2; 5	MTL; 1; 6	MTL; 2; 13	MTL; 3; 9	SIL; 1; 3	SIL; 2; 5	ZAN; 1; 5	ZAN; 2; 8	COA; 1; 16	COA; 2; 8	COA; 3; 8	LVG; 1	LVG; 2		7th*	47*

* Season still in progress.

=== Complete Formula Trophy UAE results ===
(key) (Races in bold indicate pole position; races in italics indicate fastest lap)

Year	Entrant	1	2	3	4	5	6	7	DC	Points
2024	Xcel Motorsport	DUB; 1; 19†	DUB; 2 Ret	DUB; 3; 19	YMC1; 1; 17	YMC1; 2; 17	YMC2; 1	YMC2; 2	24th	0
