= 2023 Formula 4 UAE Championship =

Motor racing competition

The 2023 Formula 4 UAE Championship was the seventh season of the Formula 4 UAE Championship, a motor racing series for the United Arab Emirates regulated according to FIA Formula 4 regulations, and organised and promoted by the Emirates Motorsport Organization (EMSO) and Top Speed.

The regular season commenced on 13 January at the Dubai Autodrome and concluded on 19 February at the Yas Marina Circuit.

== Teams and drivers ==
| Team | No. | Drivers | Class | Rounds |
|---|---|---|---|---|
| (United Arab Emirates) Xcel Motorsport | 2 | (Australia) Noah Lisle | | All |
| (United Arab Emirates) Xcel Motorsport | 21 | (Italy) Victoria Blokhina (Note: Bolduev and Smal are Russian, but they compete as neutral competitors as Russian national emblems were banned by the FIA due to the Russian invasion of Ukraine. Blokhina and Zhuravskiy, also Russians, competed under an Italian and a Kyrgyz licence respectively for the same reason.) | | TR |
| (United Arab Emirates) Xcel Motorsport | 24 | (United Arab Emirates) Sebastian Murray | R | TR |
| (United Arab Emirates) Xcel Motorsport | 33 | (Kyrgyzstan) Georgy Zhuravskiy | R | All |
| (United Arab Emirates) Xcel Motorsport | 54 | Alexander Bolduev | R | All |
| (United Arab Emirates) Xcel Motorsport | 71 | (United Arab Emirates) Federico Rifai | R | TR, All |
| (France) R-ace GP | 3 | (Mexico) Jesse Carrasquedo Jr. | | All |
| (France) R-ace GP | 12 | (Latvia) Alexander Abkhazava (Note: Abkhazava is Kazakh-Georgian-Russian but competed under a Latvian licence.) | R | All |
| (France) R-ace GP | 14 | (France) Raphaël Narac | R | 2–5 |
| (France) R-ace GP | 20 | (Malta) Zachary David | R | All |
| (United Kingdom) / Hitech Grand Prix (Note: Cars No. 5 and 7 entered as Hitech Grand Prix and cars No. 4 and 6 entered as Hitech Pulse-Eight.); (United Kingdom) / Hitech Pulse-Eight | 4 | (Australia) James Piszcyk | | TR, All |
| (United Kingdom) / Hitech Grand Prix; (United Kingdom) / Hitech Pulse-Eight | 5 | (United Kingdom) William Macintyre | R | TR, All |
| (United Kingdom) / Hitech Grand Prix; (United Kingdom) / Hitech Pulse-Eight | 6 | (United Kingdom) Kanato Le (Note: Le is a Japanese driver competing under a British licence.) | R | TR, All |
| (United Kingdom) / Hitech Grand Prix; (United Kingdom) / Hitech Pulse-Eight | 7 | (Republic of Ireland) Alex Dunne | | TR |
| (United Kingdom) / Hitech Grand Prix; (United Kingdom) / Hitech Pulse-Eight | 7 | (United Kingdom) Arvid Lindblad | R | All |
| (India) Mumbai Falcons Racing Limited | 8 | (Finland) Tuukka Taponen | R | All |
| (India) Mumbai Falcons Racing Limited | 10 | (India) Muhammad Ibrahim | R | 1–2, 5 |
| (India) Mumbai Falcons Racing Limited | 13 | (Australia) James Wharton | | All |
| (India) Mumbai Falcons Racing Limited | 28 | (India) Rishon Rajeev | | 3–4 |
| (Germany) PHM Racing | 9 | (Germany) Valentin Kluss | | All |
| (Germany) PHM Racing | 26 | (Germany) Jakob Bergmeister | R | 1–3 |
| (Germany) PHM Racing | 26 | (Thailand) Nandhavud Bhirombhakdi | | 4–5 |
| (Germany) PHM Racing | 31 | (United Kingdom) Akshay Bohra (Note: Bohra is an American-Indian driver competing under a British licence.) | R | All |
| (Germany) PHM Racing | 75 | (Denmark) Noah Strømsted | | All |
| (United Kingdom) Carlin (Note: Entered as Carlin in the Trophy Round and in round 1. Entered as Rodin Carlin in rounds 2–5.) (United Kingdom) Rodin Carlin | 11 | (New Zealand) Louis Sharp | | TR |
| (United Kingdom) Carlin (United Kingdom) Rodin Carlin | 41 | (Brazil) Fernando Barrichello | | 1, 4–5 |
| (United Kingdom) Carlin (United Kingdom) Rodin Carlin | 43 | (Australia) Costa Toparis | | TR |
| (United Kingdom) Carlin (United Kingdom) Rodin Carlin | 55 | (United Kingdom) Dion Gowda (Note: Gowda is an Indian driver competing under a British licence.) | R | All |
| (United Arab Emirates) R2Race Cavicel | 15 | (Switzerland) Léna Bühler | | All |
| (United Arab Emirates) R2Race Cavicel | 78 | (Italy) Victoria Blokhina | | All |
| (United Arab Emirates) Yas Heat Racing Academy | 17 | (United Arab Emirates) Keanu Al Azhari | R | All |
| (United Arab Emirates) Yas Heat Racing Academy | 28 | (United Arab Emirates) Keanu Al Azhari | R | TR |
| (United Arab Emirates) Yas Heat Racing Academy | 27 | (United Arab Emirates) Matteo Quintarelli | R | TR |
| (United Arab Emirates) Yas Heat Racing Academy | 93 | (United Arab Emirates) Matteo Quintarelli | R | All |
| (United Arab Emirates) Yas Heat Racing Academy | 87 | (United Arab Emirates) Hamda Al Qubaisi | | All |
| (France) Saintéloc Racing | 18 | (France) Luciano Morano | | All |
| (France) Saintéloc Racing | 30 | (Denmark) Theodor Jensen | | All |
| (France) Saintéloc Racing | 44 | (France) Théophile Naël | | All |
| (Italy) Prema Racing | 19 | (Philippines) Bianca Bustamante | | All |
| (Italy) Prema Racing | 39 | (United States) Ugo Ugochukwu | | All |
| (Italy) Prema Racing | 47 | (Italy) Nicola Lacorte | R | All |
| (Netherlands) MP Motorsport | 60 | (Netherlands) Emely de Heus | | 1–3 |
| (Netherlands) MP Motorsport | 60 | (Uzbekistan) Ismoilkhuja Akhmedkhodjaev | | 4–5 |
| (Netherlands) MP Motorsport | 61 | (Italy) Valerio Rinicella | | All |
| (Netherlands) MP Motorsport | 62 | Kirill Smal | | 1 |
| (Netherlands) MP Motorsport | 62 | (Brazil) Pedro Clerot | | 4–5 |
| (Republic of Ireland) Pinnacle VAR | 66 | (Philippines) Hiyu Yamakoshi (Note: Yamakoshi is a Japanese driver competing under a Philippine licence.) | R | 2–3 |
| (Republic of Ireland) Pinnacle VAR | 88 | (United Kingdom) Kai Daryanani (Note: Daryanani is an Indian driver competing under a British licence.) | R | All |
| (Republic of Ireland) Pinnacle VAR | 94 | (Italy) Brando Badoer | | 1, 4–5 |
| (Republic of Ireland) Pinnacle VAR | 95 | (Australia) Jack Beeton | R | All |
| (Italy) Cram Motorsport | 72 | (United Arab Emirates) Sebastian Murray | R | 1 |
| (Italy) Cram Motorsport | 91 | (United Arab Emirates) Sebastian Murray | R | 2–5 |
| (Italy) Cram Motorsport | 73 | (Italy) Flavio Olivieri | R | All |

| Icon | Legend |
|---|---|
| R | Rookie |

- Maffi Racing and Renauer Motorsport were scheduled to enter the championship, but did not appear in any rounds.
- Jerónimo Berrío was scheduled to compete for MP Motorsport, but did not appear in any rounds.

== Race calendar ==
The schedule consisted of 15 races over 5 rounds. Prior to start of the season, a non-championship Trophy Round was held in support of the 2022 Abu Dhabi Grand Prix. On 10 November 2022, the round 2 at Dubai Autodrome was moved to Kuwait Motor Town.

| Round | | Circuit | Date | Pole position | Fastest lap | Winning driver | Winning team | Supporting |
2022
| TR | R1 | (United Arab Emirates) Yas Marina Circuit, Abu Dhabi | 19 November | (Republic of Ireland) Alex Dunne | (New Zealand) Louis Sharp | (New Zealand) Louis Sharp | (United Kingdom) Carlin | Formula One World Championship |
| TR | R2 | (United Arab Emirates) Yas Marina Circuit, Abu Dhabi | 20 November | | (New Zealand) Louis Sharp | (New Zealand) Louis Sharp | (United Kingdom) Carlin | Formula One World Championship |
2023
| 1 | R1 | (United Arab Emirates) Dubai Autodrome, Dubai | 13 January | (United States) Ugo Ugochukwu | (Finland) Tuukka Taponen | (United States) Ugo Ugochukwu | (Italy) Prema Racing | Middle East Trophy; Formula Regional Middle East Championship; Renault Clio Cup Middle East |
| 1 | R2 | (United Arab Emirates) Dubai Autodrome, Dubai | 14 January | | (United States) Ugo Ugochukwu | (United States) Ugo Ugochukwu | (Italy) Prema Racing | Middle East Trophy; Formula Regional Middle East Championship; Renault Clio Cup Middle East |
| 1 | R3 | (United Arab Emirates) Dubai Autodrome, Dubai | 14 January | (United Kingdom) Arvid Lindblad | (United Kingdom) Arvid Lindblad | (United Kingdom) Arvid Lindblad | (United Kingdom) Hitech Grand Prix | Middle East Trophy; Formula Regional Middle East Championship; Renault Clio Cup Middle East |
| 2 | R1 | Kuwait Motor Town, Ali Sabah Al Salem | 27 January | (Italy) Valerio Rinicella | (United States) Ugo Ugochukwu | (Australia) James Wharton | (India) Mumbai Falcons Racing Limited | Formula Regional Middle East Championship |
| 2 | R2 | Kuwait Motor Town, Ali Sabah Al Salem | 28 January | | (Australia) James Wharton | (United States) Ugo Ugochukwu | (Italy) Prema Racing | Formula Regional Middle East Championship |
| 2 | R3 | Kuwait Motor Town, Ali Sabah Al Salem | 28 January | (Australia) James Wharton | (France) Théophile Naël | (Malta) Zachary David | (France) R-ace GP | Formula Regional Middle East Championship |
| 3 | R1 | Kuwait Motor Town, Ali Sabah Al Salem | 31 January | (United States) Ugo Ugochukwu | (Australia) James Wharton | (United States) Ugo Ugochukwu | (Italy) Prema Racing | Formula Regional Middle East Championship |
| 3 | R2 | Kuwait Motor Town, Ali Sabah Al Salem | 1 February | | (Finland) Tuukka Taponen | (Finland) Tuukka Taponen | (India) Mumbai Falcons Racing Limited | Formula Regional Middle East Championship |
| 3 | R3 | Kuwait Motor Town, Ali Sabah Al Salem | 1 February | (Australia) James Wharton | (United States) Ugo Ugochukwu | (Australia) James Wharton | (India) Mumbai Falcons Racing Limited | Formula Regional Middle East Championship |
| 4 | R1 | (United Arab Emirates) Dubai Autodrome, Dubai | 11 February | (Finland) Tuukka Taponen | (Mexico) Jesse Carrasquedo Jr. | (Finland) Tuukka Taponen | (India) Mumbai Falcons Racing Limited | Asian Le Mans Series; Formula Regional Middle East Championship |
| 4 | R2 | (United Arab Emirates) Dubai Autodrome, Dubai | 12 February | | (Italy) Brando Badoer | (Finland) Tuukka Taponen (Note: Jesse Carrasquedo Jr. originally won the race, but was given a 5 second penalty for crossing the pit entry line.) | (India) Mumbai Falcons Racing Limited | Asian Le Mans Series; Formula Regional Middle East Championship |
| 4 | R3 | (United Arab Emirates) Dubai Autodrome, Dubai | 12 February | (Finland) Tuukka Taponen | (Australia) James Wharton | (Finland) Tuukka Taponen | (India) Mumbai Falcons Racing Limited | Asian Le Mans Series; Formula Regional Middle East Championship |
| 5 | R1 | (United Arab Emirates) Yas Marina Circuit, Abu Dhabi | 18 February | (Australia) James Wharton | (Australia) James Wharton | (Australia) James Wharton | (India) Mumbai Falcons Racing Limited | Asian Le Mans Series; Formula Regional Middle East Championship |
| 5 | R2 | (United Arab Emirates) Yas Marina Circuit, Abu Dhabi | 18 February | | (Australia) James Wharton | (Australia) James Wharton | (India) Mumbai Falcons Racing Limited | Asian Le Mans Series; Formula Regional Middle East Championship |
| 5 | R3 | (United Arab Emirates) Yas Marina Circuit, Abu Dhabi | 19 February | (Australia) James Wharton | (United States) Ugo Ugochukwu | (United States) Ugo Ugochukwu | (Italy) Prema Racing | Asian Le Mans Series; Formula Regional Middle East Championship |

== Championship standings ==
Points were awarded to the top 10 classified finishers in each race.

| Position | **1st** | **2nd** | **3rd** | **4th** | **5th** | **6th** | **7th** | **8th** | **9th** | **10th** |
| Points | 25 | 18 | 15 | 12 | 10 | 8 | 6 | 4 | 2 | 1 |

=== Drivers' Championship ===
| Pos | Driver | YMC TR (United Arab Emirates) | | DUB1 (United Arab Emirates) | | | KMT1 (Kuwait) | | | KMT2 (Kuwait) | | | DUB2 (United Arab Emirates) | | | YMC (United Arab Emirates) | | | Pts |
| Pos | Driver | YMC TR (United Arab Emirates) | | R1 | R2 | R3 | R1 | R2 | R3 | R1 | R2 | R3 | R1 | R2 | R3 | R1 | R2 | R3 | Pts |
|---|---|---|---|---|---|---|---|---|---|---|---|---|---|---|---|---|---|---|---|
| 1 | (Australia) James Wharton | | | 3 | 17 | 4 | 1 | 2 | **13** | 2 | 2 | **1** | 2 | 2 | 3 | **1** | 1 | **Ret** | 232 |
| 2 | (Finland) Tuukka Taponen | | | 9 | 2 | 2 | 6 | 3 | Ret | 3 | 1 | 34† | **1** | 1 | **1** | 2 | 2 | Ret | 212 |
| 3 | (United States) Ugo Ugochukwu | | | **1** | 1 | 3 | 3 | 1 | 18 | **1** | 4 | 35† | 9 | Ret | 10 | 11 | 3 | 1 | 185 |
| 4 | (Italy) Valerio Rinicella | | | 2 | 6 | 35 | **2** | 4 | 2 | 4 | 3 | 2 | 6 | 6 | 5 | 33† | 6 | 2 | 171 |
| 5 | (United Kingdom) Arvid Lindblad | | | 8 | 3 | **1** | 5 | 33 | 7 | Ret | 16 | 5 | Ret | 19 | 4 | 3 | 5 | Ret | 107 |
| 6 | (Italy) Brando Badoer | | | 5 | 5 | 6 | | | | | | | 3 | 13 | 8 | 4 | Ret | 5 | 69 |
| 7 | (United Arab Emirates) Keanu Al Azhari | 3 | 3 | 11 | 23 | 29 | 12 | 8 | 10 | 6 | 8 | 14 | Ret | 22 | 2 | 10 | 4 | 3 | 63 |
| 8 | (Malta) Zachary David | | | 33 | 8 | 10 | 33 | 5 | 1 | Ret | 26 | 3 | 8 | 11 | 33 | Ret | 24 | Ret | 59 |
| 9 | (Denmark) Noah Strømsted | | | 36 | 7 | 30 | 8 | 6 | 15 | 5 | 12 | 37† | Ret | 3 | 23 | 5 | 30 | 9 | 55 |
| 10 | (Germany) Valentin Kluss | | | 4 | 9 | 19 | 9 | 7 | 4 | 7 | 5 | 18 | Ret | Ret | 15 | 35† | 14 | 13 | 50 |
| 11 | (France) Théophile Naël | | | 7 | Ret | 7 | 4 | 15 | 8 | 10 | 9 | 32 | 26 | 28 | 6 | 28† | 9 | 6 | 49 |
| 12 | (United Arab Emirates) Federico Al Rifai | 6 | 5 | 37 | 11 | Ret | 32 | 10 | 5 | 16 | 11 | 4 | 13 | 4 | 17 | 6 | 13 | 20 | 43 |
| 13 | (Brazil) Pedro Clerot | | | | | | | | | | | | 12 | 5 | 12 | 9 | 7 | 4 | 30 |
| 14 | (United Kingdom) William Macintyre | 10 | 4 | 32 | 32 | 13 | 13 | 9 | 23 | 29 | 6 | 13 | 4 | 31 | 14 | 7 | 11 | 11 | 28 |
| 15 | (Australia) James Piszcyk | 7 | 7 | 16 | 19 | 8 | 15 | 18 | 17 | 15 | 14 | 6 | 5 | 14 | 9 | 25 | Ret | 10 | 25 |
| 16 | Kirill Smal | | | 6 | 4 | 9 | | | | | | | | | | | | | 22 |
| 17 | (United Kingdom) Kanato Le | 5 | 2 | 13 | 16 | 14 | 7 | Ret | 9 | 8 | 22 | 17 | 7 | 8 | 11 | 12 | 15 | 29 | 22 |
| 18 | (Mexico) Jesse Carrasquedo Jr. | | | 10 | Ret | 5 | 14 | 16 | 6 | 26 | 30 | Ret | Ret | 10 | 30 | 31† | 12 | 18 | 20 |
| 19 | (Australia) Noah Lisle | | | 29 | 12 | 17 | 10 | 13 | 3 | 31 | 33† | 12 | 15 | 35† | 19 | 13 | 23 | 14 | 16 |
| 20 | (United Arab Emirates) Hamda Al Qubaisi | | | 15 | 20 | 12 | 30 | 11 | 20 | 32 | 7 | 20 | 14 | 34 | 22 | 23 | 26 | 7 | 12 |
| 21 | (United Kingdom) Akshay Bohra | | | 12 | 13 | 22 | 31 | 12 | 14 | 12 | 35† | 10 | 28 | 18 | 7 | 15 | 8 | 12 | 11 |
| 22 | (Philippines) Hiyu Yamakoshi | | | | | | 17 | Ret | 34 | 9 | Ret | 7 | | | | | | | 8 |
| 23 | (Australia) Jack Beeton | | | 20 | 18 | 31 | 16 | 20 | 21 | 25 | 27 | 31 | 18 | 7 | Ret | Ret | 19 | 19 | 6 |
| 24 | (Italy) Nicola Lacorte | | | Ret | 15 | 11 | 18 | 23 | 16 | 11 | 18 | 11 | 10 | 12 | 16 | 29† | Ret | 8 | 5 |
| 25 | (United Kingdom) Dion Gowda | | | 14 | 10 | 20 | Ret | 22 | 12 | 13 | 15 | 8 | 11 | 33 | 13 | 16 | 20 | 26 | 5 |
| 26 | (India) Muhammad Ibrahim | | | 19 | 14 | 16 | 11 | 14 | 11 | | | | | | | 8 | 29 | 16 | 4 |
| 27 | (Philippines) Bianca Bustamante | | | 26 | 28 | Ret | 20 | 25 | Ret | 33 | 10 | 15 | 17 | 9 | 21 | Ret | 28 | Ret | 3 |
| 28 | (Latvia) Alexander Abkhazava | | | 17 | 27 | 15 | Ret | 19 | 19 | 21 | Ret | 9 | 30 | 20 | 18 | 32† | Ret | 21 | 2 |
| 29 | Alexander Bolduev | | | 24 | 25 | Ret | Ret | 29 | 33 | 34 | 17 | 22 | 29 | Ret | Ret | 26 | 10 | 32 | 1 |
| 30 | (United Arab Emirates) Sebastian Murray | 8 | 9 | 35 | 35 | 26 | 21 | 26 | 32 | 27 | 13 | 26 | 21 | 24 | 24 | 30† | Ret | 25 | 0 |
| 31 | (Thailand) Nandhavud Bhirombhakdi | | | | | | | | | | | | 22 | 17 | 34 | 14 | 16 | Ret | 0 |
| 32 | (France) Raphaël Narac | | | | | | 29 | 17 | 30 | 14 | 19 | 29 | 31† | 25 | 25 | 34† | 27 | 17 | 0 |
| 33 | (Switzerland) Léna Bühler | | | 21 | 34 | 23 | Ret | Ret | Ret | 24 | 31 | 16 | 16 | 15 | 32 | 27 | 17 | 15 | 0 |
| 34 | (United Arab Emirates) Matteo Quintarelli | 9 | 11 | 18 | 22 | 27 | 24 | 21 | 22 | 18 | 25 | 33 | 19 | 16 | 20 | 21 | 18 | 22 | 0 |
| 35 | (India) Rishon Rajeev | | | | | | | | | 17 | 29 | 19 | Ret | 27 | 26 | | | | 0 |
| 36 | (United Kingdom) Kai Daryanani | | | 25 | 21 | 28 | 25 | 28 | 24 | Ret | Ret | 24 | 20 | 26 | 29 | 17 | Ret | Ret | 0 |
| 37 | (Denmark) Theodor Jensen | | | 23 | 24 | 32 | 19 | Ret | 28 | 19 | 23 | 36† | Ret | Ret | Ret | 18 | 21 | 27 | 0 |
| 38 | (Italy) Flavio Olivieri | | | Ret | 26 | 18 | 22 | 24 | 27 | 23 | 20 | 21 | Ret | 21 | 28 | Ret | Ret | 31 | 0 |
| 39 | (Kyrgyzstan) Georgy Zhuravskiy | | | 31 | 33 | 34 | Ret | 31 | 29 | 28 | 34† | 28 | 27 | Ret | 31 | 19 | 25 | 30 | 0 |
| 40 | (Germany) Jakob Bergmeister | | | 34 | Ret | 24 | 23 | Ret | NC | 20 | 24 | 23 | | | | | | | 0 |
| 41 | (Uzbekistan) Ismoilkhuja Akhmedkhodjaev | | | | | | | | | | | | 24 | 32 | 37† | 20 | 32 | 23 | 0 |
| 42 | (Brazil) Fernando Barrichello | | | 22 | 31 | 21 | | | | | | | 32 | 30 | 36† | 24 | 31 | Ret | 0 |
| 43 | (Netherlands) Emely de Heus | | | 27 | 29 | Ret | 26 | 30 | 31 | Ret | 21 | 25 | | | | | | | 0 |
| 44 | (Italy) Victoria Blokhina | 11 | 6 | 30 | 30 | 25 | 28 | 27 | 26 | 30 | 28 | 27 | 25 | 23 | 27 | 22 | 22 | 28 | 0 |
| 45 | (France) Luciano Morano | | | 28 | 36† | 33 | 27 | 32 | 25 | 22 | 32 | 30 | 23 | 29 | 35 | NC | Ret | 24 | 0 |
Trophy Round-only drivers
| – | (New Zealand) Louis Sharp | 1 | 1 | | | | | | | | | | | | | | | | – |
| – | (Republic of Ireland) Alex Dunne | **2** | 10 | | | | | | | | | | | | | | | | – |
| – | (Australia) Costa Toparis | 4 | 8 | | | | | | | | | | | | | | | | – |
| Pos | Driver | YMC TR (United Arab Emirates) | | R1 | R2 | R3 | R1 | R2 | R3 | R1 | R2 | R3 | R1 | R2 | R3 | R1 | R2 | R3 | Pts |
| Pos | Driver | YMC TR (United Arab Emirates) | | DUB1 (United Arab Emirates) | | | KMT1 (Kuwait) | | | KMT2 (Kuwait) | | | DUB2 (United Arab Emirates) | | | YMC (United Arab Emirates) | | | Pts |

| Colour | Result |
|---|---|
| Gold | Winner |
| Silver | Second place |
| Bronze | Third place |
| Green | Points classification |
| Blue | Non-points classification |
| Blue | Non-classified finish (NC) |
| Purple | Retired, not classified (Ret) |
| Red | Did not qualify (DNQ) |
| Red | Did not pre-qualify (DNPQ) |
| Black | Disqualified (DSQ) |
| White | Did not start (DNS) |
| White | Withdrew (WD) |
| White | Race cancelled (C) |
| Blank | Did not practice (DNP) |
| Blank | Did not arrive (DNA) |
| Blank | Excluded (EX) |

**Bold** – Pole
Italics – Fastest Lap
† — Did not finish, but classified

=== Rookies' Championship ===
| Pos | Driver | YMC TR (United Arab Emirates) | | DUB1 (United Arab Emirates) | | | KMT1 (Kuwait) | | | KMT2 (Kuwait) | | | DUB2 (United Arab Emirates) | | | YMC (United Arab Emirates) | | | Pts |
| Pos | Driver | YMC TR (United Arab Emirates) | | R1 | R2 | R3 | R1 | R2 | R3 | R1 | R2 | R3 | R1 | R2 | R3 | R1 | R2 | R3 | Pts |
|---|---|---|---|---|---|---|---|---|---|---|---|---|---|---|---|---|---|---|---|
| 1 | (Finland) Tuukka Taponen | | | 2 | 1 | 2 | 2 | 1 | Ret | 1 | 1 | 21† | 1 | 1 | 1 | 1 | 1 | Ret | 279 |
| 2 | (United Kingdom) Arvid Lindblad | | | 1 | 2 | 1 | 1 | 19 | 3 | Ret | 7 | 3 | Ret | 9 | 3 | 2 | 3 | Ret | 179 |
| 3 | (United Arab Emirates) Keanu Al Azhari | 1 | 2 | 3 | 13 | 16 | 5 | 3 | 5 | 2 | 3 | 10 | Ret | 12 | 2 | 6 | 2 | 1 | 153 |
| 4 | (United Arab Emirates) Federico Al Rifai | 3 | 4 | 18 | 5 | Ret | 17 | 5 | 2 | 9 | 4 | 2 | 7 | 2 | 9 | 3 | 7 | 8 | 121 |
| 5 | (Malta) Zachary David | | | 15 | 3 | 3 | 18 | 2 | 1 | Ret | 15 | 1 | 4 | 5 | 17 | Ret | 12 | Ret | 120 |
| 6 | (United Kingdom) William Macintyre | 6 | 3 | 14 | 17 | 5 | 6 | 4 | 13 | 17 | 2 | 9 | 2 | 16 | 7 | 4 | 6 | 3 | 109 |
| 7 | (United Kingdom) Kanato Le | 2 | 1 | 5 | 9 | 6 | 3 | Ret | 4 | 3 | 12 | 11 | 3 | 4 | 5 | 7 | 8 | 13 | 109 |
| 8 | (United Kingdom) Akshay Bohra | | | 4 | 6 | 11 | 16 | 6 | 8 | 6 | 18† | 7 | 13 | 8 | 4 | 8 | 4 | 4 | 90 |
| 9 | (Italy) Nicola Lacorte | | | Ret | 8 | 4 | 9 | 13 | 9 | 5 | 9 | 8 | 5 | 6 | 8 | 14† | Ret | 2 | 76 |
| 10 | (United Kingdom) Dion Gowda | | | 6 | 4 | 10 | Ret | 12 | 7 | 7 | 6 | 5 | 6 | 17 | 6 | 9 | 11 | 12 | 69 |
| 11 | (India) Muhammad Ibrahim | | | 9 | 7 | 8 | 4 | 7 | 6 | | | | | | | 5 | 15 | 5 | 58 |
| 12 | (Australia) Jack Beeton | | | 10 | 10 | 17 | 7 | 10 | 11 | 14 | 16 | 19 | 8 | 3 | Ret | Ret | 10 | 7 | 35 |
| 13 | (Philippines) Hiyu Yamakoshi | | | | | | 8 | Ret | 20 | 4 | Ret | 4 | | | | | | | 28 |
| 14 | (Latvia) Alexander Abkhazava | | | 7 | 16 | 7 | Ret | 9 | 10 | 12 | Ret | 6 | 15 | 10 | 10 | 16† | Ret | 9 | 27 |
| 15 | (France) Raphaël Narac | | | | | | 15 | 8 | 17 | 8 | 10 | 18 | 16† | 14 | 13 | 17† | 14 | 6 | 17 |
| 16 | (United Arab Emirates) Matteo Quintarelli | 5 | 6 | 8 | 12 | 14 | 13 | 11 | 12 | 10 | 14 | 20 | 9 | 7 | 11 | 12 | 9 | 10 | 16 |
| 17 | Alexander Bolduev | | | 11 | 14 | Ret | Ret | 17 | Ret | 18 | 8 | 13 | 14 | Ret | Ret | 13 | 5 | 16 | 14 |
| 18 | (United Arab Emirates) Sebastian Murray | 4 | 5 | 17 | 19 | 13 | 10 | 15 | 18 | 15 | 5 | 16 | 11 | 13 | 12 | 15† | Ret | 11 | 11 |
| 19 | (Italy) Flavio Olivieri | | | Ret | 15 | 9 | 11 | 14 | 15 | 13 | 11 | 12 | Ret | 11 | 14 | Ret | Ret | 15 | 2 |
| 20 | (United Kingdom) Kai Daryanani | | | 12 | 11 | 15 | 14 | 16 | 14 | Ret | Ret | 15 | 10 | 15 | 15 | 10 | Ret | Ret | 2 |
| 21 | (Germany) Jakob Bergmeister | | | 16 | Ret | 12 | 12 | Ret | NC | 11 | 13 | 14 | | | | | | | 0 |
| 22 | (Kyrgyzstan) Georgy Zhuravskiy | | | 13 | 18 | 18 | Ret | 18 | 16 | 16 | 17† | 17 | 12 | Ret | 16 | 11 | 13 | 14 | 0 |
| Pos | Driver | YMC TR (United Arab Emirates) | | R1 | R2 | R3 | R1 | R2 | R3 | R1 | R2 | R3 | R1 | R2 | R3 | R1 | R2 | R3 | Pts |
| Pos | Driver | YMC TR (United Arab Emirates) | | DUB1 (United Arab Emirates) | | | KMT1 (Kuwait) | | | KMT2 (Kuwait) | | | DUB2 (United Arab Emirates) | | | YMC (United Arab Emirates) | | | Pts |

| Colour | Result |
|---|---|
| Gold | Winner |
| Silver | Second place |
| Bronze | Third place |
| Green | Points classification |
| Blue | Non-points classification |
| Blue | Non-classified finish (NC) |
| Purple | Retired, not classified (Ret) |
| Red | Did not qualify (DNQ) |
| Red | Did not pre-qualify (DNPQ) |
| Black | Disqualified (DSQ) |
| White | Did not start (DNS) |
| White | Withdrew (WD) |
| White | Race cancelled (C) |
| Blank | Did not practice (DNP) |
| Blank | Did not arrive (DNA) |
| Blank | Excluded (EX) |

**Bold** – Pole
Italics – Fastest Lap
† — Did not finish, but classified

=== Teams' Championship ===
Ahead of each event, the teams nominate two drivers that accumulate teams' points.

| Pos | Team | Points |
|---|---|---|
| 1 | (India) Mumbai Falcons Racing Limited | 444 |
| 2 | (Netherlands) MP Motorsport | 223 |
| 3 | (Italy) Prema Racing | 190 |
| 4 | (United Kingdom) Hitech Grand Prix | 135 |
| 5 | (Germany) PHM Racing | 109 |
| 6 | (Netherlands) Pinnacle VAR | 83 |
| 7 | (France) R-ace GP | 79 |
| 8 | (United Arab Emirates) Yas Heat Racing Academy | 75 |
| 9 | (United Arab Emirates) Xcel Motorsport | 59 |
| 10 | (France) Saintéloc Racing | 49 |
| 11 | (United Kingdom) Hitech Pulse-Eight | 47 |
| 12 | (United Kingdom) Rodin Carlin | 5 |
| 13 | (Italy) Cram Motorsport | 0 |
| 14 | (United Arab Emirates) R2Race Cavicel | 0 |
