= 2022 Ginetta Junior Championship =

Junior motorsport

The 2022 Michelin Ginetta Junior Championship was a multi-event, one make motor racing championship held across England and Scotland. The championship included a mix of professional teams and privately funded drivers, aged between 14 and 17, competing in Ginetta G40s that were conformed to the technical regulations for the championship.

== Teams and drivers ==
Team	No.	Driver	Rounds
R Racing	10	(United Kingdom) Josh Rowledge	All
R Racing	26	(United Kingdom) Freddie Slater	6, 8–9
R Racing	31	(Singapore) Akshay Bohra	1–4, 7
R Racing	37	(United Kingdom) Luke Watts	All
R Racing	42	(United States) Luca Hopkinson	All
R Racing	72	(United Kingdom) Sonny Smith	1–8
R Racing	77	(Mexico) Ian Aguilera	1–5
Elite Motorsport	14	(South Africa) Aqil Alibhai	All
Elite Motorsport	18	(United Kingdom) Will Macintyre	All
Elite Motorsport	19	(Japan) Kanato Le	All
Elite Motorsport	24	(United Kingdom) McKenzie Douglass	All
Elite Motorsport	44	(India) Shravan Shanmugavel	1–5, 7–9
Elite Motorsport	95	(United Kingdom) Joe Warhurst	All
Preptech UK	16	(United Kingdom) Thomas Spragg	8–9
Preptech UK	21	(United Kingdom) Alisha Palmowski	All
Preptech UK	27	(United Kingdom) Flynn McHardy	All
Preptech UK	54	(United Kingdom) Mikey Porter	8–9
Preptech UK	71	(United Kingdom) Fergus Chalmers	1–3, 5
Preptech UK	81	(United Kingdom) Zac Meakin	All
Assetto Motorsport	23	(United Kingdom) Harri Reynolds	All
Assetto Motorsport	28	(United Kingdom) Ella Lloyd	All
Assetto Motorsport	38	(United Kingdom) Finn Harrison	8–9
Assetto Motorsport	80	(United Kingdom) Liona Theobald	All
Assetto Motorsport	88	(United Kingdom) James Wyres	1–4, 6–7
Fox Motorsport	47	(United Kingdom) Harry Moss	8
Fox Motorsport	48	(United Kingdom) Liam McNeilly	All
Fox Motorsport	49	(United Kingdom) Maurice Henry	All
Fox Motorsport	94	(United Kingdom) Jacob Hodgkiss	1–6
Fox Motorsport	99	(United Kingdom) Sid Smith	8–9
Ultimate Speed Racing	50	(United Kingdom) Adam Brown	All
Team HARD	70	(United Kingdom) AJ Rock	1

== Race calendar ==
Round	Circuit	Date	Map of circuit locations
1	(United Kingdom) Donington Park, Leicestershire (National Circuit)	23–24 April	2022 Ginetta Junior Championship (the United Kingdom)
2	(United Kingdom) Brands Hatch, Kent (Indy Circuit)	14–15 May	2022 Ginetta Junior Championship (the United Kingdom)
3	(United Kingdom) Thruxton Circuit, Hampshire	28–29 May	2022 Ginetta Junior Championship (the United Kingdom)
4	(United Kingdom) Croft Circuit, North Yorkshire	25–26 June	2022 Ginetta Junior Championship (the United Kingdom)
5	(United Kingdom) Knockhill Racing Circuit, Fife	20–31 July	2022 Ginetta Junior Championship (the United Kingdom)
6	(United Kingdom) Snetterton, Norfolk (300 Circuit)	13–14 August	2022 Ginetta Junior Championship (the United Kingdom)
7	(United Kingdom) Thruxton Circuit, Hampshire	27–28 August	2022 Ginetta Junior Championship (the United Kingdom)
8	(United Kingdom) Silverstone, Northamptonshire (National Circuit)	24–25 September	2022 Ginetta Junior Championship (the United Kingdom)
9	(United Kingdom) Brands Hatch, Kent (Grand Prix Circuit)	8–9 October	2022 Ginetta Junior Championship (the United Kingdom)

== Race results ==
Round		Circuit	Date	Pole position	Fastest lap	Winning driver	Winning team	Rookie Winner
1	R1	Donington Park (National Circuit, Leicestershire)	23–24 April	(United Kingdom) Sonny Smith	(United Kingdom) Joe Warhurst	(United Kingdom) Josh Rowledge	R Racing	(United Kingdom) Sonny Smith
1	R2	Donington Park (National Circuit, Leicestershire)	23–24 April	(United Kingdom) Harri Reynolds	(United Kingdom) Josh Rowledge	(United Kingdom) Harri Reynolds	Assetto Motorsport	(United Kingdom) Will Macintyre
1	R3	Donington Park (National Circuit, Leicestershire)	23–24 April		(United Kingdom) Will Macintyre	(United Kingdom) Harri Reynolds	Assetto Motorsport	(United Kingdom) Will Macintyre
2	R4	Brands Hatch (Indy Circuit, Kent)	14–15 May	(United Kingdom) Luke Watts	(United Kingdom) Joe Warhurst	(Japan) Kanato Le	Elite Motorsport	(Japan) Kanato Le
2	R5	Brands Hatch (Indy Circuit, Kent)	14–15 May	(United Kingdom) Joe Warhurst	(United Kingdom) Harri Reynolds	(United Kingdom) Will Macintyre	Elite Motorsport	(United Kingdom) Will Macintyre
2	R6	Brands Hatch (Indy Circuit, Kent)	14–15 May		(United Kingdom) McKenzie Douglass	(United Kingdom) Harri Reynolds	Elite Motorsport	(United Kingdom) Will Macintyre
3	R7	Thruxton Circuit (Hampshire)	28–29 May	(United Kingdom) Will Macintyre	(South Africa) Aqil Alibhai	(United Kingdom) Josh Rowledge	R Racing	(United Kingdom) Will Macintyre
3	R8	Thruxton Circuit (Hampshire)	28–29 May	(South Africa) Aqil Alibhai	(United Kingdom) Harri Reynolds	(Mexico) Ian Aguilera	R Racing	(United Kingdom) Will Macintyre
4	R9	Croft Circuit (North Yorkshire)	25–26 June	(United Kingdom) Sonny Smith	(United Kingdom) Sonny Smith	(United Kingdom) Sonny Smith	R Racing	(United Kingdom) Sonny Smith
4	R10	Croft Circuit (North Yorkshire)	25–26 June	(United Kingdom) Harri Reynolds	(United Kingdom) Sonny Smith	(United Kingdom) Will Macintyre	Elite Motorsport	(United Kingdom) Will Macintyre
5	R11	Knockhill Racing Circuit (Fife)	30–31 July	(United Kingdom) Sonny Smith	(United Kingdom) Maurice Henry	(United Kingdom) Maurice Henry	Fox Motorsport	(United Kingdom) Sonny Smith
5	R12	Knockhill Racing Circuit (Fife)	30–31 July	(United Kingdom) Josh Rowledge	(United Kingdom) Joe Warhurst	(United Kingdom) Josh Rowledge	R Racing	(United Kingdom) Will Macintyre
5	R13	Knockhill Racing Circuit (Fife)	30–31 July		(United Kingdom) Joe Warhurst	(United Kingdom) Josh Rowledge	R Racing	(United Kingdom) Will Macintyre
6	R14	Snetterton (300 Circuit, Norfolk)	13–14 August	(United Kingdom) Liam McNeilly	(United Kingdom) Maurice Henry	(United Kingdom) Will Macintyre	Elite Motorsport	(United Kingdom) Will Macintyre
6	R15	Snetterton (300 Circuit, Norfolk)	13–14 August	(United Kingdom) Maurice Henry	(United Kingdom) Liam McNeilly	(Japan) Kanato Le	Elite Motorsport	(Japan) Kanato Le
6	R16	Snetterton (300 Circuit, Norfolk)	13–14 August		(United Kingdom) Will Macintyre	(United Kingdom) Josh Rowledge	R Racing	(United Kingdom) Will Macintyre
7	R17	Thruxton Circuit (Hampshire)	27–28 August	(Japan) Kanato Le	(United Kingdom) Josh Rowledge	(United Kingdom) Will Macintyre	Elite Motorsport	(United Kingdom) Will Macintyre
7	R18	Thruxton Circuit (Hampshire)	27–28 August	(United Kingdom) Harri Reynolds	(United Kingdom) Josh Rowledge	(United Kingdom) Josh Rowledge	R Racing	(United Kingdom) Will Macintyre
7	R19	Thruxton Circuit (Hampshire)	27–28 August		(United Kingdom) Joe Warhurst	(United Kingdom) Josh Rowledge	R Racing	(United Kingdom) Sonny Smith
8	R20	Silverstone (National Circuit, Northamptonshire)	24–25 September	(United Kingdom) Sonny Smith	(United Kingdom) Josh Rowledge	(United Kingdom) Josh Rowledge	R Racing	(Japan) Kanato Le
8	R21	Silverstone (National Circuit, Northamptonshire)	24–25 September	(United Kingdom) Sonny Smith	(United Kingdom) Sonny Smith	(United Kingdom) Josh Rowledge	R Racing	(United Kingdom) Will Macintyre
8	R22	Silverstone (National Circuit, Northamptonshire)	24–25 September		(United Kingdom) Josh Rowledge	(United Kingdom) Will Macintyre	Elite Motorsport	(United Kingdom) Will Macintyre
9	R23	Brands Hatch (Grand Prix Circuit, Kent)	8–9 October	(United Kingdom) Liam McNeilly	(United Kingdom) Liam McNeilly	(United Kingdom) Liam McNeilly	Fox Motorsport	(United Kingdom) Will Macintyre
9	R24	Brands Hatch (Grand Prix Circuit, Kent)	8–9 October	(United Kingdom) Liam McNeilly	(United Kingdom) Liam McNeilly	(United Kingdom) Liam McNeilly	Fox Motorsport	(United Kingdom) Will Macintyre
9	R25	Brands Hatch (Grand Prix Circuit, Kent)	8–9 October		(United Kingdom) Joe Warhurst	(United Kingdom) Will Macintyre	Elite Motorsport	(United Kingdom) Will Macintyre

== Championship standings ==
Points system
**1st**	**2nd**	**3rd**	**4th**	**5th**	**6th**	**7th**	**8th**	**9th**	**10th**	**11th**	**12th**	**13th**	**14th**	**15th**	**16th**	**17th**	**18th**	**19th**	**20th**	R1 PP	FL
35	30	26	22	20	18	16	14	12	11	10	9	8	7	6	5	4	3	2	1	1	1

=== Drivers' championship ===
Pos	Driver	DON			BHI			THR1		CRO		KNO			SNE			THR2			SIL			BHGP			Total	Drop	Pen.	Points
1	(United Kingdom) Josh Rowledge	1	2	3	4	2	4	1	4	Ret	2	2	**1**	1	6	5	1	2	1	1	1	1	4	2	DNS	DNS	652			652
2	(United Kingdom) Will Macintyre **(R)**	8	5	4	2	1	3	**2**	6	2	1	11	5	3	1	10	2	1	3	4	11	3	1	4	2	1	636	10	15	611
3	(United Kingdom) Liam McNeilly	9	6	5	9	8	7	Ret	7	5	6	5	3	2	**2**	2	6	4	4	6	3	12	6	**1**	1	2	520		6	514
4	(United Kingdom) Harri Reynolds	3	**1**	1	5	3	1	4	3	3	**3**	Ret	14	Ret	3	8	3	7	**12**	15	4	2	2	DSQ	8	DNS	479		36	443
5	(United Kingdom) Joe Warhurst	5	3	2	3	**4**	6	Ret	DNS	10	22	4	2	4	4	4	8	5	6	3	13	Ret	11	9	4	5	427			427
6	(South Africa) Aqil Alibhai	15	4	11	10	6	2	3	**2**	6	16	6	6	6	5	7	10	3	9	10	12	Ret	12	3	5	4	413	5	9	399
7	(Japan) Kanato Le **(R)**	7	7	8	1	15	9	Ret	Ret	8	4	9	13	11	9	1	5	**17**	7	12	2	5	3	Ret	7	3	380		6	374
8	(United Kingdom) Maurice Henry	10	Ret	9	6	5	14	8	9	Ret	9	1	Ret	9	Ret	**6**	7	8	15	8	7	6	8	6	9	8	315		9	306
9	(United Kingdom) Sonny Smith **(R)**	**2**	18	7	Ret	7	8	5	18	**1**	5	**3**	21	8	DSQ	3	4	6	10	2	**Ret**	4	DSQ				333		36	297
10	(United Kingdom) Luke Watts **(R)**	4	Ret	Ret	**Ret**	Ret	5	6	11	4	8	10	8	13	Ret	12	11	15	5	5	6	10	9	11	3	10	293		12	281
11	(United Kingdom) Zac Meakin	12	15	Ret	8	10	12	13	5	18	11	7	4	5	10	11	12	10	2	9	8	Ret	16	Ret	10	9	273			273
12	(United Kingdom) McKenzie Douglass **(R)**	16	10	14	7	14	19	7	12	13	12	14	10	10	8	9	15	9	13	7	10	7	7	7	12	6	274	3	6	265
13	(United Kingdom) Alisha Palmowski **(R)**	21	9	Ret	12	Ret	17	12	Ret	Ret	13	8	9	18	Ret	14	9	12	19	11	9	13	13	8	Ret	18	156			156
14	(United Kingdom) Adam Brown	14	8	19	16	11	18	14	10	16	Ret	16	17	14	Ret	13	13	11	8	DNS	22	15	15	14	14	11	156			156
15	(United Kingdom) Freddie Slater **(R)**														7	15	14				5	11	5	6	6	7	133			133
16	(United States) Luca Hopkinson **(R)**	19	14	16	17	13	16	16	Ret	12	18	Ret	12	Ret	11	17	18	19	16	13	18	14	10	10	11	15	137		21	116
17	(Mexico) Ian Aguilera	6	Ret	10	20	Ret	11	DSQ	1	7	7	DSQ	7	7													139		36	103
18	(United Kingdom) Fergus Chalmers	13	11	6	11	12	10	10	8			15	11	19													109		6	103
19	(United Kingdom) Jacob Hodgkiss	11	Ret	12	14	9	Ret	9	16	11	15	12	15	12	WD	WD	WD										95		6	89
20	(United Kingdom) James Wyres **(R)**	17	16	13	15	17	13	15	13	Ret	14				12	16	16	16	17	Ret	WD	WD	WD				75			75
21	(United Kingdom) Ella Lloyd **(R)**	23	Ret	20	21	16	20	18	Ret	19	19	Ret	16	16	Ret	Ret	17	14	11	Ret	14	Ret	Ret	13	15	13	73		6	67
22	(India) Shravan Shanmugavel **(R)**	20	17	18	18	19	Ret	19	15	17	21	17	18	20				18	18	16	20	19	18	Ret	19	17	56			56
23	(United Kingdom) Liona Theobald **(R)**	22	19	17	Ret	20	22	20	14	15	20	18	19	17	13	19	19	20	DNS	DNS	21	18	19	18	17	DNS	57		6	51
24	(United Kingdom) Sid Smith **(R)**																				15	9	17	12	13	12	48			48
25	(United Kingdom) Flynn McHardy **(R)**	Ret	Ret	21	19	21	21	17	Ret	14	17	13	20	15	Ret	18	20	WD	WD	WD	19	Ret	20	17	21	16	48			48
26	(United Kingdom) Mikey Porter **(R)**																				17	8	14	15	18	19	36			36
27	(United Kingdom) Thomas Spragg **(R)**																				16	16	Ret	16	16	20	21			21
28	(United Kingdom) AJ Rock **(R)**	Ret	13	15																							14			14
29	(United Kingdom) Finn Harrison **(R)**																				23	17	21	Ret	20	14	12		6	6
30	(Singapore) Akshay Bohra **(R)**	18	12	Ret	13	18	15	11	17	9	10							13	14	14	WD	WD	WD				88		100	-12
–	(United Kingdom) Harry Moss **(R)**																				WD	WD	WD				–			–
Pos	Driver	DON			BHI			THR1		CRO		KNO			SNE			THR2			SIL			BHGP			Total	Drop	Pen.	Points

Colour	Result
Gold	Winner
Silver	Second place
Bronze	Third place
Green	Points classification
Blue	Non-points classification
Blue	Non-classified finish (NC)
Purple	Retired, not classified (Ret)
Red	Did not qualify (DNQ)
Red	Did not pre-qualify (DNPQ)
Black	Disqualified (DSQ)
White	Did not start (DNS)
White	Withdrew (WD)
White	Race cancelled (C)
Blank	Did not practice (DNP)
Blank	Did not arrive (DNA)
Blank	Excluded (EX)

**Bold** – Pole

Italics – Fastest Lap

† — Did not finish, but classified (completed more than 75% of race distance)

**(R)** - Rookie

== Ginetta Junior Winter Series ==
The 2022 Ginetta Junior Winter Series was a multi-event race weekend across the 12th and 13th November at the Brands Hatch circuit in support of the BARC race meeting.

=== Teams and drivers ===
Team	No.	Driver
R Racing	19	(United Kingdom) Mikey Porter
R Racing	27	(United Kingdom) Freddie Slater
R Racing	37	(United Kingdom) Luke Watts
R Racing	42	(United States) Luca Hopkinson
R Racing	78	(United Kingdom) Reza Seewooruthun
Preptech UK	16	(United Kingdom) Thomas Spragg
Preptech UK	21	(United Kingdom) Alisha Palmowski
Assetto Motorsport	38	(United Kingdom) Finn Harrison
Assetto Motorsport	66	(United Kingdom) Freddie Allum
Assetto Motorsport	90	(United Kingdom) Chase Fernandez
Fox Motorsport	47	(United Kingdom) Sid Smith
Fox Motorsport	99	(United Kingdom) Harry Moss
Xentek Motorsport	31	(United Kingdom) Felix Livesey
Xentek Motorsport	41	(United Kingdom) Dan Munro
Xentek Motorsport	43	(United Kingdom) Tudor Nechita
Elite Motorsport	24	(United Kingdom) McKenzie Douglass
Elite Motorsport	50	(United Kingdom) Charlie Hart
Alastair Rushforth Racing	24	(United Kingdom) Brea Angliss

=== Championship standings ===
Points system
**1st**	**2nd**	**3rd**	**4th**	**5th**	**6th**	**7th**	**8th**	**9th**	**10th**	**11th**	**12th**	**13th**	**14th**	**15th**	**16th**	**17th**	**18th**	**19th**	**20th**	R1 PP	FL
35	30	26	22	20	18	16	14	12	11	10	9	8	7	6	5	4	3	2	1	1	1

==== Drivers' championship ====
Pos	Driver	BHI				Points
1	(United Kingdom) Freddie Slater **(R)**	8	1	1	**1**	122
2	(United Kingdom) Alisha Palmowski	**4**	3	**2**	4	102
3	(United States) Luca Hopkinson	2	7	3	7	88
4	(United Kingdom) McKenzie Douglass **(R)**	3	17†	4	2	82
5	(United Kingdom) Luke Watts	1	**2**	8	DNS	81
6	(United Kingdom) Mikey Porter **(R)**	4	3	4	4	79
7	(United Kingdom) Reza Seewooruthun **(R)**	Ret	4	6	3	66
8	(United Kingdom) Sid Smith **(R)**	7	5	9	6	66
9	(United Kingdom) Finn Harrison **(R)**	6	8	7	DNS	48
10	(United Kingdom) Dan Munro **(R)**	11	9	11	8	46
11	(United Kingdom) Chase Fernandez **(R)**	13	10	13	9	39
12	(United Kingdom) Charlie Hart **(R)**	10	10	15	10	39
13	(United Kingdom) Freddie Allum **(R)**	14	11	14	13	32
14	(United Kingdom) Brea Angliss **(R)**	15	12	15	12	30
15	(United Kingdom) Felix Livesey **(R)**	12	16	12	16	28
16	(United Kingdom) Harry Moss **(R)**	16	13	17	15	23
17	(United Kingdom) Tudor Nechita **(R)**	17	14	16	14	23
18	(United Kingdom) Thomas Spragg **(R)**	9	DNS	DNS	11	22

Colour	Result
Gold	Winner
Silver	Second place
Bronze	Third place
Green	Points classification
Blue	Non-points classification
Blue	Non-classified finish (NC)
Purple	Retired, not classified (Ret)
Red	Did not qualify (DNQ)
Red	Did not pre-qualify (DNPQ)
Black	Disqualified (DSQ)
White	Did not start (DNS)
White	Withdrew (WD)
White	Race cancelled (C)
Blank	Did not practice (DNP)
Blank	Did not arrive (DNA)
Blank	Excluded (EX)

**Bold** – Pole

Italics – Fastest Lap

† — Did not finish, but classified (completed more than 75% of race distance)

**(R)** - Rookie
