= Nash, Buckinghamshire =

Village in Buckinghamshire, England

Coordinates: 52.0034°N 0.8665°W

Nash
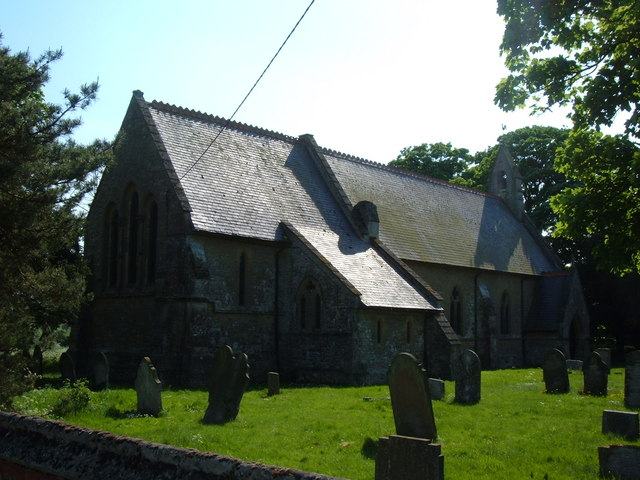
- All Saints Church, in the village of Nash

- Location within Buckinghamshire
- Interactive map of Nash
- Population: 417 (2011 census)
- OS grid reference: SP779343
- Civil parish: Nash
- Unitary authority: Buckinghamshire
- Ceremonial county: Buckinghamshire
- Region: South East
- Country: England
- Sovereign state: United Kingdom
- Post town: MILTON KEYNES
- Postcode district: MK17
- Dialling code: 01908
- Police: Thames Valley
- Fire: Buckinghamshire
- Ambulance: South Central
- UK Parliament: Buckingham and Bletchley

Nash is a village and civil parish in Buckinghamshire, England. It is in the north of the county, about 5 miles (8.0 km) south-west of the centre of Milton Keynes and 4 miles (6.4 km) east of Buckingham. According to the 2011 census, the population total of Nash was 417.

== History ==
The village name is Anglo Saxon in origin, and means "at the ash-tree". In the Domesday Book of 1086 the village was recorded as Esse. The name went through 'Ash' and 'La Nash' to 'Nash'. Between 1870 and 1872, Nash was described as

"NASH, a hamlet in Whaddon parish, Bucks; 5½ miles E of Buckingham. Acres, 1, 430. Real property, £1, 813, Pop., 462. Houses, 103. The property is divided chiefly among five. The hamlet forms chief part of the chapelry of Thornton-cum-Nash; and contains the church of that chapelry, a Baptist chapel, and a national school. Nash Common is a meet for the Whaddon Chase hounds."

Nash was designated a civil parish between 1896 and 1899. Before this it was classed as a hamlet within the parish of Whaddon.

Although there has never been a separate manor in Nash, the manor in neighbouring Whaddon has historically been referred to as the manor of Whaddon and Nash. The earliest mention of the manor pre-dates the modern name of 'Nash', and refers to the manor as that of 'Whaddone with Esse'.

== Government ==
The village is served by a parish council of seven members, who are elected every four years, with the next elections set to take place in 2025. However much of the parish council's role is to advise Buckinghamshire Council who make most of the decisions with regards to maintenance and planning. Nash's parliamentary constituency is Buckingham and Bletchley.

== Geography ==
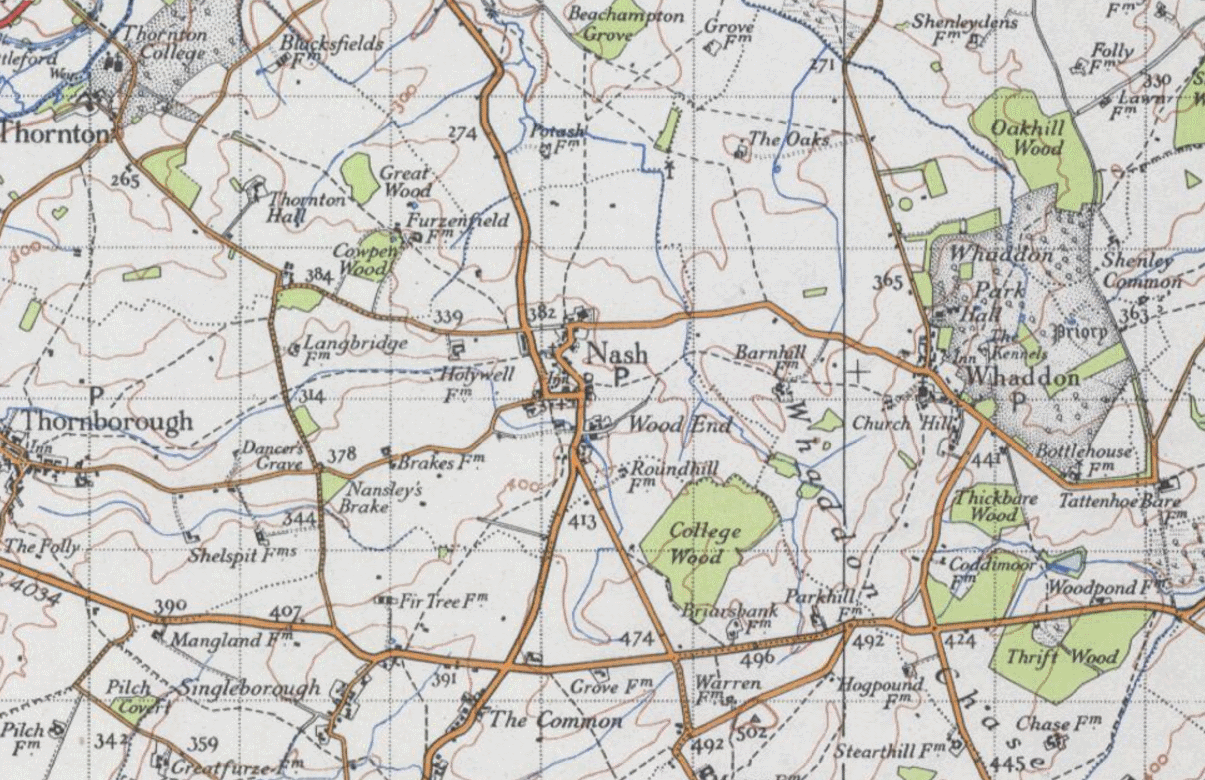
1945 Ordnance Survey Map of Nash, to a scale of 1:63360

The village is located 46 miles (75 km) north west of London and is about 125 metres (410 ft) above sea level.

According to the British Geological Survey, the bedrock consists of Mudstone with superficial deposits of sand and gravel from river terraces and glaciofluvia deposits.

The first Land Utilisation Survey of Britain in the 1930s, found the land around Nash to be predominantly 'Meadowland and Permanent Grass', with some areas of 'Forest and Woodland'.

== Demography ==
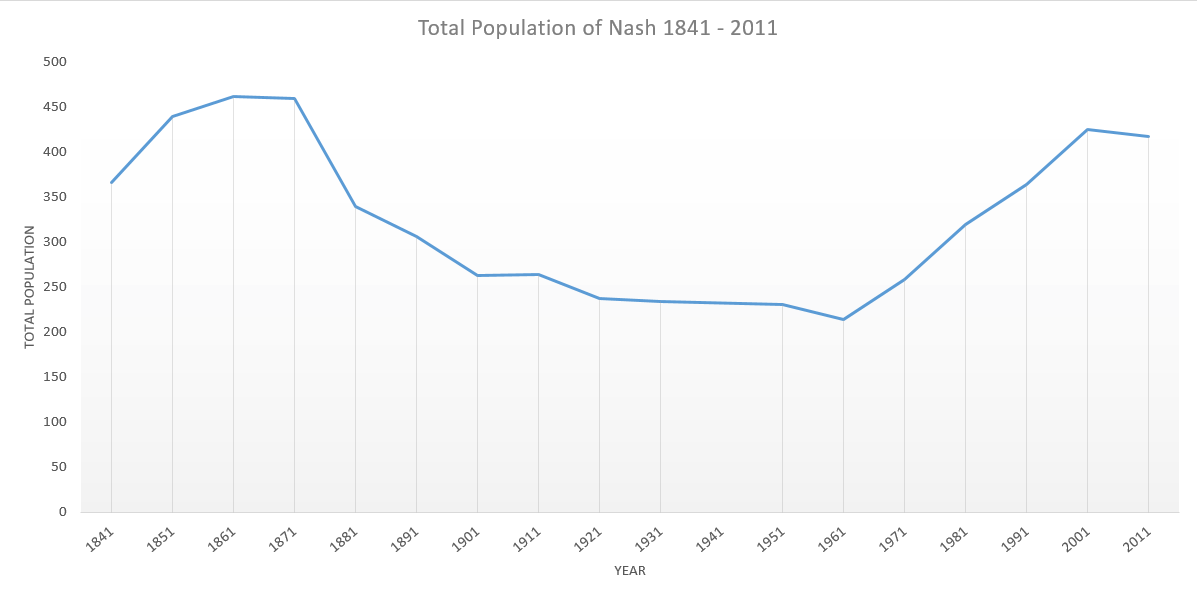
Total population of Nash Civil Parish, Buckinghamshire, as reported by the Census of Population from 1841 to 2011

The most recent, 2011, census of the UK put the total population of Nash at 417. The population has grown sharply since the lowest recorded population total of 214, which was found in the 1961 census. The population previously went through a long period of decline between 1871 (when the highest total population of 460 was recorded) and 1961.

The ethnic composition of Nash is overwhelmingly white, with just 14 individuals identifying as being from other ethnic groups in the 2011 census. Just over 60% of the population identify as Christian, whilst more than 37% either stated that they are not religious, or did not state their religion.

The 2011 census also recorded that 43% of the population were in full-time employment, and 11.4% in part-time employment. Just 2% of the population were identified as being unemployed, which is lower than the average for Aylesbury Vale (3.1%), and England (4.4%).

== Economy ==
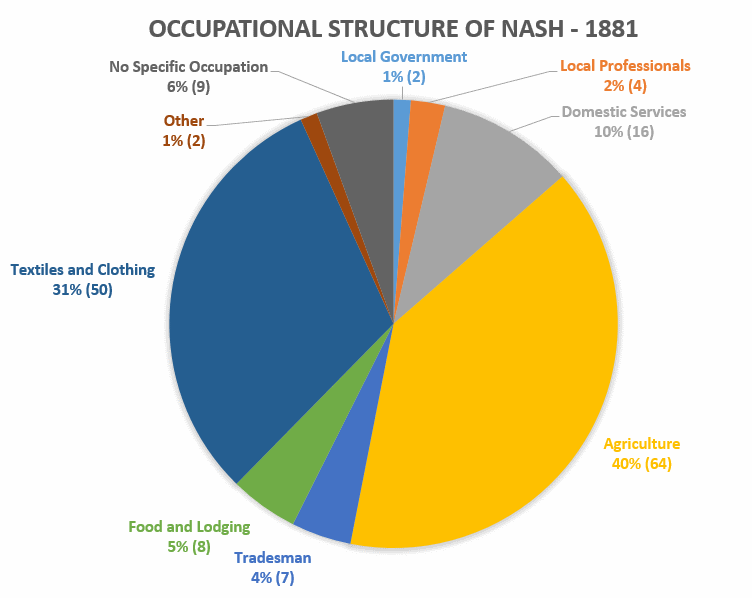
The Occupational Structure of Nash as shown by the Census of 1881.

Of the 212 members of the population in employment, the majority appear to commute to work, with some of the highest employing industries including 'Wholesale and Retail Trade; Repair of Motor Vehicles and Motor Cycles' (18.9%) and 'Manufacturing' (9.4%), neither of which take place within the village. Other sectors with high levels of employment include 'Professional, Scientific and Technical Activities' (13.2%) and 'Education' (12.7%).

This contrasts greatly from some of the traditional industries which were previously common in the village. In 1881, the main industries of the parish were agriculture (40% of the population), and textiles (31% of the population).

== Culture and community ==
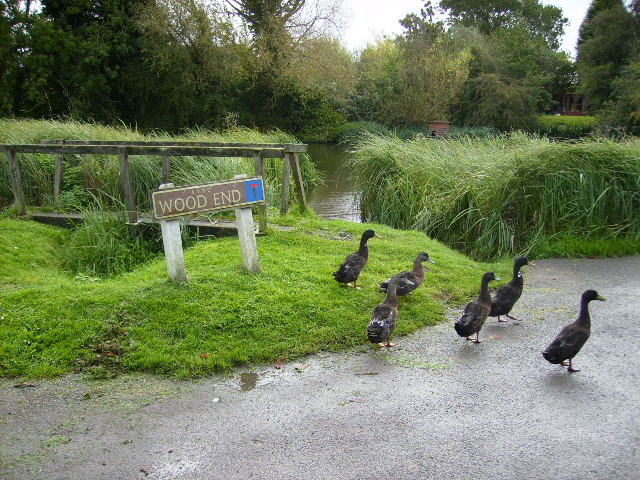
The pond at Wood End, in Nash

=== Community facilities ===
After the village school closed in 1948, the building was converted into a community hall for the use of the villagers. The hall is available for hire, and is used for community events, including a youth club.

=== Landmarks ===
The All Saints Church in Nash dates from 1857 when the foundation stone was laid. It was based on designs by renowned architect George Edmund Street.

== Education ==
Nash has not had its own school since it closed in 1948. It now sits within the catchment area of schools in local villages. For aged 4 to 7 this is Whaddon Church of England School, and for 7+ it is covered by Great Horwood Church of England School.
