= Rowan Campbell-Pilling =

British racing driver (born 2006)

- Nationality: (United Kingdom) British
- Born: 30 December 2006 (age 19) Sheffield, United Kingdom

GB3 Championship career
- Debut season: 2026
- Current team: Xcel Motorsport
- Car number: 8
- Starts: 23
- Wins: 2
- Podiums: 0
- Poles: 0
- Fastest laps: 7
- Best finish: 6th in 2026

Previous series
- 2026 2025 2024-2025: UAE4 Series; Formula Trophy; F4 British

Rowan Campbell-Pilling (born 30 December 2006) is a British racing driver who last competed in the GB3 Championship with Xcel Motorsport.

== Career ==
=== Formula 4 (2024–2026) ===
==== 2024 ====
In 2024, Campbell-Pilling made his single-seater debut in British F4 with Phinsys by Argenti. After taking his first podium of the year at Brands Hatch, Campbell-Pilling had to wait until the third-to-last round of the year at Donington Park to take his second and final podium of the year. In his first season in the series, Campbell-Pilling finished 10th in the overall standings, on 100.5 points.

==== 2025 ====
Campbell-Pilling switched to JHR Developments for the 2025 season. After taking his maiden podium in the reverse-grid race at Silverstone, Campbell-Pilling finished third in race one at Knockhill before taking his only win of the season in race three. In his second and final season in British F4, Campbell-Pilling closed out his tenure in the series with another 10th-place points finish, this time on 127.5 points. At the end of the year, Campbell-Pilling joined Xcel Motorsport to compete in Formula Trophy. After taking two podiums on his debut round at Dubai, Campbell-Pilling took his only win of the season from pole in race one of the second Yas Marina round to end the year third in points.

==== 2026 ====
Remaining in the UAE for the start of 2026, Campbell-Pilling joined Pinnacle Motorsport to race in the UAE4 Series. Following a third-place finish in race three of the opening Yas Marina round, Campbell-Pilling only scored one other top 10 in the remaining three rounds as he ended the season 13th in the standings.

=== Formula Regional (2026–present) ===
Campbell-Pilling stepped up to GB3 in 2026 with Xcel Motorsport. In the season-opening round at Silverstone, Campbell-Pilling finished fifth in the opening two races of the weekend, before taking seventh in race three, and then taking three podiums between the Hungaroring and second Silverstone rounds. Following that, Campbell-Pilling won at Donington Park and Barcelona en route to sixth overall with two more podiums to his name.

== Karting record ==
=== Karting career summary ===
Season	Series	Team	Position
2021	Daniel Ricciardo Series — DRS1000		1st

== Racing record ==
=== Racing career summary ===
Season	Series	Team	Races	Wins	Poles	F/Laps	Podiums	Points	Position
2024	F4 British Championship	Phinsys by Argenti	27	0	0	0	2	100.5	10th
2025	F4 British Championship	JHR Developments	28	1	1	1	3	127.5	10th
2025	Formula Trophy	Xcel Motorsport	7	1	1	0	3	77	**3rd**
2026	UAE4 Series	Pinnacle Motorsport	12	0	0	0	1	24	13th
2026	GB3 Championship	Xcel Motorsport	23	2	0	0	7	338	6th
2026	Silverlake C1 Endurance Series – Am	RTR Automotive	2	0	0	0	0		

* Season still in progress.

=== Complete F4 British Championship results ===
(key) (Races in bold indicate pole position) (Races in italics indicate fastest lap)

Year	Team	1	2	3	4	5	6	7	8	9	10	11	12	13	14	15	16	17	18	19	20	21	22	23	24	25	26	27	28	29	30	31	32	DC	Points
2024	Phinsys by Argenti	DPN; 1; 12	DPN; 2; 11^{4}	DPN; 3 C	BHI; 1; 3	BHI; 2; 8^{2}	BHI; 3; 21	SNE; 1; 13	SNE; 2; 11	SNE; 3; 16	THR; 1 DSQ	THR; 2; 9^{4}	THR; 3; 9	SILGP; 1 Ret	SILGP; 2; 15	SILGP; 3; 8	ZAN; 1; 10	ZAN; 2 Ret	ZAN; 3 Ret	KNO; 1; 8	KNO; 2; 16	KNO; 3; 4	DPGP; 1; 7	DPGP; 2; 13	DPGP; 3; 6^{5}	DPGP; 4; 3	SILN; 1; 6	SILN; 2 C	SILN; 3 DNS	BHGP; 1; 6	BHGP; 2; 8	BHGP; 3; 8	BHGP; 4; 11	10th	100.5
2025	JHR Developments	DPN; 1; 6	DPN; 2; 10	DPN; 3; 6	SILGP; 1; 12	SILGP; 2; 2^{2}	SILGP; 3; 6	SNE; 1; 7	SNE; 2; 6	SNE; 3; 17	THR; 1; 7	THR; 2; 19	THR; 3; 11	OUL; 1 Ret	OUL; 2; 17	OUL; 3; 10	SILGP; 1 Ret	SILGP; 2; 4	ZAN; 1 Ret	ZAN; 2; 12	ZAN; 3; 12^{2}	KNO; 1; 3	KNO; 2; 8^{3}	KNO; 3; 1	DPGP; 1 Ret	DPGP; 2 Ret	DPGP; 3; 8	SILN; 1; 7	SILN; 2; 5^{8}	SILN; 3; 9	BHGP; 1 DNS	BHGP; 2 Ret	BHGP; 3 WD	10th	127.5

=== Complete Formula Trophy results ===
(key) (Races in bold indicate pole position; races in italics indicate fastest lap)

Year	Team	1	2	3	4	5	6	7	DC	Points
2025	Xcel Motorsport	DUB; 1; 2	DUB; 2; 10	DUB; 3; 3	YMC1; 1; 15	YMC1; 2; 5	**YMC2**; **1**; 1	YMC2; 2; 6	3rd	77

=== Complete UAE4 Series results ===
(key) (Races in bold indicate pole position; races in italics indicate fastest lap)

Year	Team	1	2	3	4	5	6	7	8	9	10	11	12	DC	Points
2026	Pinnacle Motorsport	YMC1; 1; 6	YMC1; 2 Ret	YMC1; 3; 3	YMC2; 1; 31	YMC2; 2; 14	YMC2; 3; 10	DUB; 1; 16	DUB; 2; 20	DUB; 3; 11	LUS; 1; 19	LUS; 2; 15	LUS; 3; 34†	13th	24

=== Complete GB3 Championship results ===
(key) (Races in bold indicate pole position) (Races in italics indicate fastest lap)

Year	Team	1	2	3	4	5	6	7	8	9	10	11	12	13	14	15	16	17	18	19	20	21	22	23	24	DC	Points
2026	Xcel Motorsport	SIL1; 1; 5	SIL1; 2; 5	SIL1; 3; 7	SPA; 1 Ret	SPA; 2; 14	SPA; 3 C	HUN; 1; 7	HUN; 2 Ret	HUN; 3; 3^{1}	RBR; 1; 14	RBR; 2; 8	RBR; 3 Ret	SIL2; 1; 3	SIL2; 2; 2	SIL2; 3; 7^{4}	DON; 1; 6	DON; 2; 7	DON; 3; 1^{2}	BRH; 1; 5	BRH; 2; 2	BRH; 3; 8^{3}	CAT; 1; 2	CAT; 2; 15	CAT; 3; 1	6th	339

* Season still in progress.
