= 2024 F4 British Championship =

The 2024 ROKiT F4 British Championship was a multi-event, Formula 4 open-wheel single seater motor racing championship held across United Kingdom. The championship featured a mix of professional motor racing teams and privately funded drivers, competing in Formula 4 cars that conformed to the technical regulations for the championship. This, the tenth season, following on from the British Formula Ford Championship, was the tenth year that the cars conform to the FIA's Formula 4 regulations. Part of the TOCA tour, it formed part of the extensive program of support categories built up around the BTCC centrepiece.

The season commenced on 27 April at Donington Park, utilising the National circuit, and concluded on 6 October at Brands Hatch, utilising the Grand Prix circuit, after thirty races to held at ten meetings, eight of ten meetings were in the support of the 2024 British Touring Car Championship.

== Teams and drivers ==
Team	No.	Drivers	Class	Rounds
(United Kingdom) Fortec Motorsport	3	(Netherlands) Nina Gademan	R	1–7, 9–10
(United Kingdom) Fortec Motorsport	8	(India) Kai Daryanani		All
(United Kingdom) Fortec Motorsport	48	(Canada) Alex Berg		All
(United Kingdom) Hitech Pulse-Eight	4	(United Kingdom) Reza Seewooruthun		All
(United Kingdom) Hitech Pulse-Eight	5	(South Africa) Mika Abrahams		1–5
(United Kingdom) Hitech Pulse-Eight	6	(Philippines) Bianca Bustamante		6
(United Kingdom) Hitech Pulse-Eight	7	(United Kingdom) Deagen Fairclough		All
(United Kingdom) Hitech Pulse-Eight	50	(United Kingdom) Thomas Bearman	R	9–10
(United Kingdom) Hitech Pulse-Eight	55	(Mexico) Ernesto Rivera	R	6
(New Zealand) Rodin Motorsport	9	(United Kingdom) Abbi Pulling		1–7, 10
(New Zealand) Rodin Motorsport	12	(Australia) Alex Ninovic		All
(New Zealand) Rodin Motorsport	18	(United Kingdom) James Higgins		All
(New Zealand) Rodin Motorsport	78	(United Kingdom) Jack Sherwood		All
(United Kingdom) JHR Developments	10	(United Kingdom) Harri Reynolds	R	9
(United Kingdom) JHR Developments	11	(United Kingdom) Chloe Chong		All
(United Kingdom) JHR Developments	22	(Sweden) Joel Bergström	R	1–3, 5
(United Kingdom) JHR Developments	33	(Algeria) Leo Robinson		All
(United Kingdom) JHR Developments	44	(United Kingdom) Ella Lloyd		1–8, 10
(United Kingdom) Chris Dittmann Racing	15	(Germany) Carrie Schreiner		5–6
(United Kingdom) Chris Dittmann Racing	36	(Sweden) Gustav Jonsson		9
(United Kingdom) Chris Dittmann Racing	47	(United Kingdom) Jessica Edgar		6
(United Kingdom) Chris Dittmann Racing	77	(United Kingdom) Bart Harrison	R	1–3, 5–10
(United Kingdom) Phinsys by Argenti	16	(Brazil) Aurelia Nobels		6
(United Kingdom) Phinsys by Argenti	19	(Slovakia) Matúš Ryba	R	5–6, 9
(United Kingdom) Phinsys by Argenti	21	(United Kingdom) Emily Cotty	R	9
(United Kingdom) Phinsys by Argenti	42	(United Kingdom) Rowan Campbell-Pilling	R	All
(United Kingdom) Phinsys by Argenti	56	(China) Yuanpu Cui	R	All
(United Kingdom) Virtuosi Racing	17	(United Kingdom) Maxwell Dodds		1–8
(United Kingdom) Virtuosi Racing	24	(Hungary) Martin Molnár	R	All
(United Kingdom) Virtuosi Racing	99	(China) Yuhao Fu	R	All
(United Arab Emirates) Xcel Motorsport	23	(United Arab Emirates) Zack Scoular	R	All
(United Arab Emirates) Xcel Motorsport	27	(Luxembourg) Chester Kieffer		6
(United Arab Emirates) Xcel Motorsport	29	(Sweden) August Raber	R	1–6, 8–10

Icon	Class
R	Rookie

== Race calendar ==
All but one rounds were held in the United Kingdom as the championship featured its first abroad round in the Netherlands. Initially, as of 15 May 2023, all rounds were scheduled to support 2024 British Touring Car Championship. The revision published on 29 November contained the replacement of the rounds at the Oulton Park and the Croft Circuit by the Grand Prix layout at the Silverstone Circuit and the Circuit Zandvoort.

Round		Circuit	Date	Pole position	Fastest lap	Winning driver	Winning team	Rookie winner
1	R1	(United Kingdom) Donington Park (National Circuit, Leicestershire)	27 April	(United Kingdom) James Higgins	(United Kingdom) Deagen Fairclough	(United Kingdom) Deagen Fairclough	(United Kingdom) Hitech Pulse-Eight	(China) Yuanpu Cui
1	R2	(United Kingdom) Donington Park (National Circuit, Leicestershire)	28 April		(United Kingdom) Deagen Fairclough	(South Africa) Mika Abrahams (Note: Berg finished first but received two five seconds penalties for exceeding track limits and weaving on approach to grid. Abrahams inherited the win.)	(United Kingdom) Hitech Pulse-Eight	(United Kingdom) Bart Harrison
1	R3	(United Kingdom) Donington Park (National Circuit, Leicestershire)	28 April	(Australia) Alex Ninovic	race cancelled due to adverse weather conditions, rescheduled to 24 August			
2	R4	(United Kingdom) Brands Hatch (Indy Circuit, Kent)	11 May	(United Kingdom) Deagen Fairclough	(United Kingdom) Deagen Fairclough	(United Kingdom) Deagen Fairclough	(United Kingdom) Hitech Pulse-Eight	(United Kingdom) Rowan Campbell-Pilling
2	R5	(United Kingdom) Brands Hatch (Indy Circuit, Kent)	12 May		(United Kingdom) Abbi Pulling	(United Kingdom) Abbi Pulling	(United Kingdom) Rodin Motorsport	(United Arab Emirates) Zack Scoular
2	R6	(United Kingdom) Brands Hatch (Indy Circuit, Kent)	12 May	(United Kingdom) Deagen Fairclough	(United Kingdom) Reza Seewooruthun	(United Kingdom) Deagen Fairclough	(United Kingdom) Hitech Pulse-Eight	(China) Yuanpu Cui
3	R7	(United Kingdom) Snetterton Motor Racing Circuit (300 Circuit, Norfolk)	25 May	(Australia) Alex Ninovic	(Australia) Alex Ninovic	(Australia) Alex Ninovic	(United Kingdom) Rodin Motorsport	(Sweden) Joel Bergström
3	R8	(United Kingdom) Snetterton Motor Racing Circuit (300 Circuit, Norfolk)	26 May		(United Kingdom) Deagen Fairclough	(China) Yuanpu Cui	(United Kingdom) Phinsys by Argenti	(China) Yuanpu Cui
3	R9	(United Kingdom) Snetterton Motor Racing Circuit (300 Circuit, Norfolk)	26 May	(Australia) Alex Ninovic	(Australia) Alex Ninovic	(Australia) Alex Ninovic	(United Kingdom) Rodin Motorsport	(Sweden) Joel Bergström
4	R10	(United Kingdom) Thruxton Circuit (Hampshire)	8 June	(United Kingdom) Deagen Fairclough	(United Kingdom) Deagen Fairclough	(United Kingdom) Deagen Fairclough	(United Kingdom) Hitech Pulse-Eight	(China) Yuhao Fu
4	R11	(United Kingdom) Thruxton Circuit (Hampshire)	9 June		(United Kingdom) Reza Seewooruthun	(Canada) Alexander Berg	(United Kingdom) Fortec Motorsport	(China) Yuanpu Cui
4	R12	(United Kingdom) Thruxton Circuit (Hampshire)	9 June	(United Kingdom) Deagen Fairclough	(United Kingdom) Deagen Fairclough	(United Kingdom) Reza Seewooruthun	(United Kingdom) Hitech Pulse-Eight	(United Arab Emirates) Zack Scoular
5	R13	(United Kingdom) Silverstone Circuit (Grand Prix Circuit, Northamptonshire)	15 June	(United Kingdom) Deagen Fairclough	(United Kingdom) Deagen Fairclough	(United Kingdom) Deagen Fairclough	(United Kingdom) Hitech Pulse-Eight	(China) Yuanpu Cui
5	R14	(United Kingdom) Silverstone Circuit (Grand Prix Circuit, Northamptonshire)	16 June		(Algeria) Leo Robinson	(Algeria) Leo Robinson	(United Kingdom) JHR Developments	(Sweden) Joel Bergström
5	R15	(United Kingdom) Silverstone Circuit (Grand Prix Circuit, Northamptonshire)	16 June	(United Kingdom) Reza Seewooruthun	(United Kingdom) Reza Seewooruthun	(United Kingdom) Reza Seewooruthun	(United Kingdom) Hitech Pulse-Eight	(United Kingdom) Rowan Campbell-Pilling
6	R16	(Netherlands) Circuit Zandvoort (Zandvoort)	13 July	(United Kingdom) Deagen Fairclough	(United Kingdom) Deagen Fairclough	(United Kingdom) Deagen Fairclough	(United Kingdom) Hitech Pulse-Eight	(Hungary) Martin Molnár
6	R17 (Note: Race initially held on 13 July but abandoned due to an incident at the start following a technical issue at the circuit. Rescheduled to 14 July.)	(Netherlands) Circuit Zandvoort (Zandvoort)	14 July		(United Kingdom) Deagen Fairclough	(Australia) Alex Ninovic	(United Kingdom) Rodin Motorsport	(China) Yuanpu Cui
6	R18	(Netherlands) Circuit Zandvoort (Zandvoort)	14 July	(United Kingdom) Deagen Fairclough	(Australia) Alex Ninovic	(United Kingdom) Deagen Fairclough	(United Kingdom) Hitech Pulse-Eight	(Hungary) Martin Molnár
7	R19	(United Kingdom) Knockhill Racing Circuit (Fife)	10 August	(United Kingdom) Deagen Fairclough	(United Kingdom) Deagen Fairclough	(United Kingdom) Deagen Fairclough	(United Kingdom) Hitech Pulse-Eight	(Hungary) Martin Molnár
7	R20	(United Kingdom) Knockhill Racing Circuit (Fife)	11 August		(United Kingdom) Deagen Fairclough	(Algeria) Leo Robinson	(United Kingdom) JHR Developments	(China) Yuanpu Cui
7	R21	(United Kingdom) Knockhill Racing Circuit (Fife)	11 August	(United Kingdom) Deagen Fairclough	(United Kingdom) Deagen Fairclough	(United Kingdom) Deagen Fairclough	(United Kingdom) Hitech Pulse-Eight	(Hungary) Martin Molnár
8	R22	(United Kingdom) Donington Park (Grand Prix Circuit, Leicestershire)	24 August	(United Kingdom) Deagen Fairclough	(United Kingdom) Deagen Fairclough	(Australia) Alex Ninovic	(United Kingdom) Rodin Motorsport	(United Arab Emirates) Zack Scoular
8	R3	(United Kingdom) Donington Park (Grand Prix Circuit, Leicestershire)	24 August	(Australia) Alex Ninovic	(United Kingdom) Deagen Fairclough	(United Kingdom) James Higgins	(United Kingdom) Rodin Motorsport	(China) Yuanpu Cui
8	R23	(United Kingdom) Donington Park (Grand Prix Circuit, Leicestershire)	25 August		(United Kingdom) Deagen Fairclough	(United Kingdom) James Higgins	(United Kingdom) Rodin Motorsport	(United Kingdom) Rowan Campbell-Pilling
8	R24	(United Kingdom) Donington Park (Grand Prix Circuit, Leicestershire)	25 August	(United Kingdom) Deagen Fairclough	(United Kingdom) Deagen Fairclough	(United Kingdom) Deagen Fairclough	(United Kingdom) Hitech Pulse-Eight	(United Kingdom) Rowan Campbell-Pilling
9	R25	(United Kingdom) Silverstone Circuit (National Circuit, Northamptonshire)	21 September	(United Kingdom) Deagen Fairclough	(Australia) Alex Ninovic	(United Kingdom) Deagen Fairclough	(United Kingdom) Hitech Pulse-Eight	(United Kingdom) Rowan Campbell-Pilling
9	R26	(United Kingdom) Silverstone Circuit (National Circuit, Northamptonshire)	22 September	race cancelled due to adverse weather conditions, rescheduled to 5 October				
9	R27	(United Kingdom) Silverstone Circuit (National Circuit, Northamptonshire)	22 September	(United Kingdom) Deagen Fairclough	(United Kingdom) Deagen Fairclough	(United Kingdom) Deagen Fairclough	(United Kingdom) Hitech Pulse-Eight	(Hungary) Martin Molnár
10	R28	(United Kingdom) Brands Hatch (Grand Prix Circuit, Kent)	5 October	(United Kingdom) Deagen Fairclough	(United Kingdom) Deagen Fairclough	(United Kingdom) Deagen Fairclough	(United Kingdom) Hitech Pulse-Eight	(United Kingdom) Rowan Campbell-Pilling
10	R26	(United Kingdom) Brands Hatch (Grand Prix Circuit, Kent)	5 October		(Australia) Alex Ninovic	(Algeria) Leo Robinson	(United Kingdom) JHR Developments	(Hungary) Martin Molnár
10	R29	(United Kingdom) Brands Hatch (Grand Prix Circuit, Kent)	6 October		(United Kingdom) Jack Sherwood	(Australia) Alex Ninovic	(United Kingdom) Rodin Motorsport	(Hungary) Martin Molnár
10	R30	(United Kingdom) Brands Hatch (Grand Prix Circuit, Kent)	6 October	(United Kingdom) Deagen Fairclough	(United Kingdom) Deagen Fairclough	(United Kingdom) Deagen Fairclough	(United Kingdom) Hitech Pulse-Eight	(China) Yuanpu Cui

== Championship standings ==
Points were awarded to the top ten classified finishers in races 1 and 3 and for the top eight classified finishers in race 2. Race two, which had its grid formed by reversing the top twelve from the qualifying order, awarded extra points, up until a maximum of ten, for positions gained from the drivers' respective starting positions. Two points were awarded for the best legal lap set in the qualifying session. Bonus points counted towards only the drivers' standings.

Races	Position, points per race										
Races	**1st**	**2nd**	**3rd**	**4th**	**5th**	**6th**	**7th**	**8th**	**9th**	**10th**	**FL**
Qualifying	2										
Races 1 & 3	25	18	15	12	10	8	6	4	2	1	1
Race 2	15	12	10	8	6	4	2	1			1

=== Drivers' standings ===
Pos	Driver	DPN (United Kingdom)			BHI (United Kingdom)			SNE (Note: Half points were awarded for Round 9 as the leader completed more than two laps but less than 75% of the original race distance.) (United Kingdom)			THR (United Kingdom)			SILGP (United Kingdom)			ZAN (Netherlands)			KNO (United Kingdom)			DPGP (United Kingdom)				SILN (United Kingdom)			BHGP (Note: Half points were awarded for Round 29 as the leader completed more than two laps but less than 75% of the original race distance.) (United Kingdom)				Pen.	Pts
1	(United Kingdom) Deagen Fairclough	1	2^{7}	C	**1**	7^{5}	**1**	3	3^{8}	NC	**1**	5^{7}	**Ret**	**1**	Ret	2	**1**	3^{9}	**1**	**1**	5^{7}	**1**	**2**	2	2^{10}	**1**	**1**	C	**1**	**1**	5^{5}	5^{7}	**1**		579.5
2	(Australia) Alex Ninovic	3	5^{7}	**C**	2	17	Ret	**1**	4^{8}	**1**	3	3^{3}	2	3	3^{5}	3	2	1^{2}	18	2	Ret	3	1	**7**	7^{1}	2	20	C	Ret	Ret	3^{5}	1^{7}	4		357
3	(United Kingdom) Reza Seewooruthun	5	14	C	4	18	3	5	18	5	16	7^{1}	1	2	8^{4}	**1**	11	24	2	4	4^{1}	8	8	4	5^{9}	13	5	C	6	2	2	9^{2}	3		271
4	(United Kingdom) James Higgins	**2**	4^{7}	C	5	4^{4}	4	2	15	3	8	6^{1}	5	4	5^{4}	Ret	8	8^{5}	10	12	Ret	11	5	1	1^{2}	5	2	C	2	5	7^{2}	7^{2}	5		268.5
5	(United Kingdom) Jack Sherwood	6	3^{2}	C	6	2^{1}	19	4	2^{7}	2	4	Ret	3	Ret	Ret	5	Ret	4^{10}	3	5	9	5	Ret	3	10	10	3	C	4	4	6	Ret	DNS		230
6	(Algeria) Leo Robinson	13	12^{1}	C	14	DSQ	7	12	7	Ret	7	4	7	7	1^{1}	4	Ret	9^{6}	Ret	7	1^{2}	10	3	5	9^{1}	4	11	C	11	3	1^{2}	10	2	18	164
7	(United Kingdom) Abbi Pulling	7	17	C	7	1	6	9	5^{9}	7	2	12	4	11	10^{6}	11	9	2	20	6	7	7								18		4	8		130
8	(Hungary) Martin Molnár	15	Ret	C	9	9^{4}	10	10	16	9	14	13	8	13	16^{2}	17	3	7^{2}	5	3	10	2	14	10	12^{3}	9	9	C	3	9	4^{2}	3^{1}	13		117.5
9	(China) Yuanpu Cui	4	10	C	8	13	5	8	1^{1}	11	DSQ	8	Ret	6	7	13	7	6^{2}	11	10	3^{1}	9	9	8	8	6	14	C	14	11	15	11^{3}	7	3	102.5
10	(United Kingdom) Rowan Campbell-Pilling	12	11^{4}	C	3	8^{2}	21	13	11	6	DSQ	9^{4}	9	Ret	15	8	10	Ret	Ret	8	16	4	7	13	6^{5}	3	6	C	DNS	6	8	8	11		100.5
11	(United Kingdom) Ella Lloyd	8	7	C	Ret	12^{9}	20	7	9	12	10	17^{1}	15	5	2	7	12	5	7	Ret	2	DNS	Ret	17	3^{6}	12				12		2	9		99
12	(India) Kai Daryanani	11	8^{2}	C	10	Ret	12	18	8^{10}	19	9	10^{4}	12	9	11^{6}	Ret	6	13	4	11	8	12	4	Ret	4^{2}	8	13	C	13	8	12^{5}	13	6		93
13	(South Africa) Mika Abrahams	9	1^{5}	C	Ret	6^{3}	2	Ret	20	8	6	2	10	10	9^{5}	14																			76
14	(Canada) Alex Berg	14	6	C	11	15	8	11	19^{1}	13	5	1	11	16	Ret	21	22	15^{6}	12	Ret	15	13	10	6	13	Ret	8	C	9	15	10^{3}	15^{5}	12		60.5
15	(United Arab Emirates) Zack Scoular	16	20	C	19	3^{3}	14	Ret	Ret	14	Ret	Ret	6	19	13^{7}	20	19	10^{10}	Ret	13	Ret	17	6	9	Ret	16	22	C	5	10	16	6	16	9	52
16	(United Kingdom) Maxwell Dodds	20	15^{4}	C	17	16^{2}	18	15	10^{6}	10	11	11^{9}	16	12	Ret	6	4	11	Ret	15	13^{2}	18	12	14	Ret	11									43.5
17	(Sweden) Joel Bergström	17	13	C	12	10^{6}	16	6	6^{4}	4				8	4	10																			41
18	(Netherlands) Nina Gademan	19	18^{3}	C	16	19^{1}	13	16	12^{7}	16	13	14^{2}	14	15	17^{2}	18	16	12^{2}	Ret	14	11^{5}	14					16	C	17	14	13	12^{6}	14		28
19	(China) Yuhao Fu	18	19^{1}	C	18	14^{8}	17	17	13^{9}	18	12	15^{2}	17	20	Ret	15	13	23	21	16	14^{3}	16	15	15	15^{3}	14	18	C	10	13	18	17	Ret		27
20	(United Kingdom) Bart Harrison	10	9^{8}	C	13	11^{6}	9	DSQ (Note: Harrison was disqualified from the results of the meeting for a physical assault on Mika Abrahams in parc fermé after race two.)						17	6	9	14	16	19	9	6^{1}	6	11	11	14^{2}	15	21	C	15	7	11^{5}	18	15	27	24
21	(Sweden) August Raber	Ret	21^{1}	C	20	5	11	14	14^{7}	15	Ret	DNS	DNS	WD	WD	WD	DNS	22^{2}	17				13	12	16^{1}	Ret	10	C	16	19	14^{1}	14^{1}	Ret		19.5
22	(Mexico) Ernesto Rivera																5	26	6																18
23	(Sweden) Gustav Jonsson																										4	C	8						16
24	(United Kingdom) Chloe Chong	21	16^{2}	C	15	20	15	19	17	17	15	16	13	18	14^{1}	16	17	21^{5}	14	Ret	12^{2}	15	Ret	16	11	7	15	C	12	16	17	19	17		16
25	(United Kingdom) Harri Reynolds																										7	C	7						12
26	(Brazil) Aurelia Nobels																23	18^{9}	16																9
27	(Germany) Carrie Schreiner													21	18^{3}	19	21	20^{5}	13																8
28	(United Kingdom) Jessica Edgar																15	14^{8}	15																8
29	(Philippines) Bianca Bustamante																18	17^{2}	8																6
30	(Luxembourg) Chester Kieffer																20	19^{4}	Ret																4
31	(Slovakia) Matúš Ryba													14	12^{1}	12	Ret	25	9								12	C	19						3
32	(United Kingdom) Thomas Bearman																										17	C	DNS	17	9	16	10		1
33	(United Kingdom) Emily Cotty																										19	C	18						0
Pos	Driver	DPN (United Kingdom)			BHI (United Kingdom)			SNE (United Kingdom)			THR (United Kingdom)			SSGP (United Kingdom)			ZAN (Netherlands)			KNO (United Kingdom)			DPGP (United Kingdom)				SILN (United Kingdom)			BHGP (United Kingdom)				Pen.	Pts

Colour	Result
Gold	Winner
Silver	Second place
Bronze	Third place
Green	Points classification
Blue	Non-points classification
Blue	Non-classified finish (NC)
Purple	Retired, not classified (Ret)
Red	Did not qualify (DNQ)
Red	Did not pre-qualify (DNPQ)
Black	Disqualified (DSQ)
White	Did not start (DNS)
White	Withdrew (WD)
White	Race cancelled (C)
Blank	Did not practice (DNP)
Blank	Did not arrive (DNA)
Blank	Excluded (EX)

**Bold** – Pole
Italics – Fastest Lap
^{x} – Positions Gained

=== Rookie Cup ===
Pos	Driver	DPN (United Kingdom)			BHI (United Kingdom)			SNE (United Kingdom)			THR (United Kingdom)			SSGP (United Kingdom)			ZAN (Netherlands)			KNO (United Kingdom)			DPGP (United Kingdom)				SSN (United Kingdom)			BHGP (United Kingdom)				Pen.	Pts
1	(Hungary) Martin Molnár	15	Ret	C	9	9	10	10	16	9	14	13	8	13	16	17	3	7	5	3	10	2	14	10	12	9	9	C	3	9	4	3	13		403
2	(China) Yuanpu Cui	4	10	C	8	13	5	8	1	11	DSQ	8	Ret	6	7	13	7	6	11	10	3	9	9	8	8	6	14	C	14	11	15	11	7	3	392
3	(United Kingdom) Rowan Campbell-Pilling	12	11	C	3	8	21	13	11	6	DSQ	9	9	Ret	15	8	10	Ret	Ret	8	16	4	7	13	6	3	6	C	DNS	6	8	8	11		349
4	(United Kingdom) Bart Harrison	10	9	C	13	11	9	DSQ						17	6	9	14	16	19	9	6	6	11	11	14	15	21	C	15	7	11	18	15	27	227
5	(United Arab Emirates) Zack Scoular	16	20	C	19	3	14	Ret	Ret	14	Ret	Ret	6	19	13	20	19	10	Ret	13	Ret	17	6	9	Ret	16	22	C	5	10	16	6	16	9	198
6	(China) Yuhao Fu	18	19	C	18	14	17	17	13	18	12	15	17	20	Ret	15	13	23	21	16	14	16	15	15	15	14	18	C	10	13	18	17	Ret		183.5
7	(Netherlands) Nina Gademan	19	18	C	16	19	13	16	12	16	13	14	14	15	17	18	16	12	Ret	14	11	14					16	C	17	14	13	12	14		179
8	(Sweden) Joel Bergström	17	13	C	12	10	16	6	6	4				8	4	10																			137.5
9	(Sweden) August Raber	Ret	21	C	20	5	11	14	14	15	Ret	DNS	DNS	WD	WD	WD	DNS	22	17				13	12	16	Ret	10	C	16	19	14	14	Ret		114
10	(Slovakia) Matúš Ryba													14	12	12	Ret	25	9								12	C	19						62
11	(United Kingdom) Thomas Bearman																										17	C	DNS	17	9	16	10		39
12	(Mexico) Ernesto Rivera																5	26	6																36
13	(United Kingdom) Emily Cotty																										19	C	18						6
Pos	Driver	DPN (United Kingdom)			BHI (United Kingdom)			SNE (United Kingdom)			THR (United Kingdom)			SSGP (United Kingdom)			ZAN (Netherlands)			KNO (United Kingdom)			DPGP (United Kingdom)				SSN (United Kingdom)			BHGP (United Kingdom)				Pen.	Pts

=== Teams Cup ===
Pos	Team	Pts
1	(United Kingdom) Hitech Pulse-Eight	807.5
2	(New Zealand) Rodin Motorsport	741
3	(United Kingdom) JHR Developments	328
4	(United Kingdom) Phinsys by Argenti	230
5	(United Kingdom) Virtuosi Racing	153
6	(United Kingdom) Fortec Motorsport	145
7	(United Kingdom) Chris Dittmann Racing	58
8	(United Arab Emirates) Xcel Motorsport	58
