= Rodin Motorsport =

Kiwi-British auto racing team

(New Zealand) (United Kingdom) Rodin Motorsport
- Founded: 2024
- Founder(s): David Dicker
- Base: Farnham, Surrey, England
- Team principal(s): David Dicker; Emma Duncan
- Current series: British GT Championship; FIA Formula 2 Championship; FIA Formula 3 Championship; GB3 Championship; F1 Academy; F4 British Championship; Spanish F4 Championship; Formula 4 UAE Championship; Formula Winter Series
- Current drivers: British GT; 13. (Australia) Josh Buchan (Australia) Cameron Campbell; FIA Formula 2; 14. (Norway) Martinius Stenshorne; 15. (Republic of Ireland) Alex Dunne; FIA Formula 3; 17. (Brazil) Pedro Clerot; 18. (Italy) Brando Badoer; 19. (Singapore) Christian Ho; Formula Regional European Championship; 2. (Australia) Alex Ninovic; 4. (United Kingdom) Reza Seewooruthun; 78. (Brazil) Gabriel Gomez; GB3 Championship; 1. (Germany) Maxim Rehm; 2. (Hungary) Martin Molnár; 3. (United Kingdom) Abbi Pulling; F1 Academy; 5. (Austria) Emma Felbermayr; 20. (United Kingdom) Ella Lloyd; 28. (United Kingdom) Ella Stevens; British F4; 20. (United Kingdom) Ella Lloyd; 27. (United Kingdom) Alfie Slater; 32. (South Africa) Ethan Lennon; 51. (Belgium) Dries Van Langendonck
- Teams' Championships: GB3 Championship: 2024, 2025; F4 British Championship: 2025
- Drivers' Championships: F1 Academy: 2024: Abbi Pulling; GB3 Championship: 2024: Louis Sharp; 2025: Alex Ninovic
- Website: https://www.rodinmotorsport.com/

Rodin Motorsport is a New Zealand motor racing team based in the United Kingdom. It currently competes in nine championships: British GT, FIA Formula 2, FIA Formula 3, GB3, F1 Academy, British F4, Spanish F4, UAE4 and Formula Winter Series. The team rose from the ashes of the former Carlin team.

In 2023, New Zealand–based manufacturer Rodin Cars became the majority shareholder of Carlin Motorsport following investment from founder David Dicker in a deal that saw the team rebrand as Rodin Carlin. The Carlin family departed the team in late 2023, with Dicker taking full control and renaming the company as Rodin Motorsport.

== History ==
Rodin Cars CEO David Dicker acquired a majority stake in Carlin Motorsport in 2023. Following this investment, Carlin Motorsport was renamed into Rodin Carlin. At the end of 2023, Carlin Motorsport founder Trevor Carlin was fired by Dicker following a fallout between the two parties related to poor finances and Carlin's contributions to the F1 movie. Rodin Carlin was then re-established as Rodin Motorsport.

=== F1 Academy ===
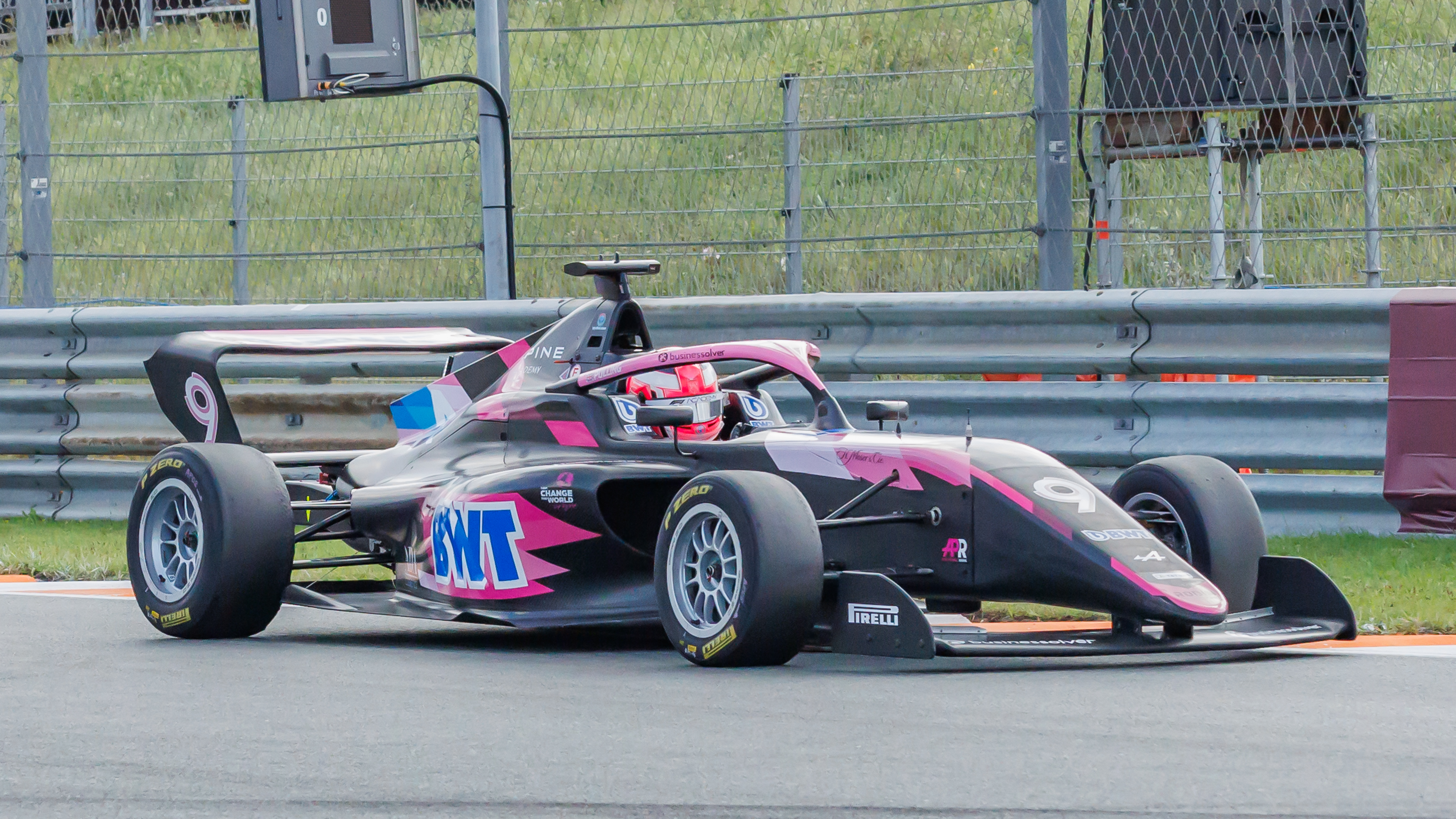
Abbi Pulling driving a Rodin Motorsport F1 Academy car at Circuit Zandvoort (2024)

For the 2024 season of F1 Academy, Rodin Motorsport retained Abbi Pulling and Jessica Edgar after competing with the team in their guise as Rodin Carlin. Lola Lovinfosse signed with the team after previously competing in the 2023 season with Campos Racing. In Round 5 at Qatar, Pulling finished Race 1 in second and won the championship, also securing Rodin Motorsport's first drivers' championship.

For the 2025 season, Chloe Chong, Emma Felbermayr and Ella Lloyd joined the team. Lloyd will return for the 2026 season with Rodin Motorsport. Ella Stevens will join Lloyd as the two McLaren supported drivers for the season.

=== GB3 Championship ===
For winning the 2024 season of F1 Academy, Pulling received a fully funded seat in GB3 Championship with Rodin Motorsport for the 2025 season.

=== FIA Formula 3 Championship ===
In 2024, the team signed 2023 GB3 champion Callum Voisin. Joseph Loake, who finished third in the 2023 GB3 Championship, was the second driver to be signed to the team. Returning FIA Formula 3 driver Piotr Wiśnicki completed the team's lineup having previously raced for PHM Racing by Charouz in 2023.

=== FIA Formula 2 Championship ===
For the 2024 Formula 2 Championship, the team signed Zane Maloney, who was with the team under its guise as Rodin Carlin, and 2023 Super Formula champion Ritomo Miyata.

For 2025, Alex Dunne and Amaury Cordeel joined the team. Cordeel replaced the Australian driver Christian Mansell, who stepped away from racing for personal reasons. Dunne won his first race with the team at the Sakhir feature race and a second at Imola, eventually finishing fifth in the Drivers' Championship.

The 2026 championship saw Martinius Stenshorne replacing Cordeel. Stenshorne took his first win in the championship at the Canadian feature race.

== Current series results ==
=== FIA Formula 2 ===
Year	Chassis	Engine	Tyres	Drivers	Races	Wins	Poles	F. Laps	Podiums	D.C.	Pts	T.C.	Pts
2024	Dallara; F2 2024	Mecachrome; V634T V6 t	P	(Barbados) Zane Maloney	26	2	1	0	7	4th	140	8th	171
2024	Dallara; F2 2024	Mecachrome; V634T V6 t	P	(Italy) Leonardo Fornaroli	2	0	0	0	0	29th	0	8th	171
2024	Dallara; F2 2024	Mecachrome; V634T V6 t	P	(Japan) Ritomo Miyata	28	0	0	2	0	19th	31	8th	171
2025	Dallara; F2 2024	Mecachrome; V634T V6 t	P	(Belgium) Amaury Cordeel	23	0	0	0	0	19th	3	7th	155
2025	Dallara; F2 2024	Mecachrome; V634T V6 t	P	(Norway) Martinius Stenshorne	4	0	0	0	0	20th	2	7th	155
2025	Dallara; F2 2024	Mecachrome; V634T V6 t	P	(Republic of Ireland) Alex Dunne	27	2	2	2	8	5th	150	7th	155
2026	Dallara; F2 2024	Mecachrome; V634T V6 t	P	(Norway) Martinius Stenshorne	24	1	1	3	4	7th	107	3rd	296*
2026	Dallara; F2 2024	Mecachrome; V634T V6 t	P	(Republic of Ireland) Alex Dunne	25	1	1	3	9	3rd	189	3rd	296*

* Season still in progress.

==== In detail ====
Year	Drivers	1	2	3	4	5	6	7	8	9	10	11	12	13	14	15	16	17	18	19	20	21	22	23	24	25	26	27	28	29	T.C.	Points
2024		BHR; SPR	BHR; FEA	JED; SPR	JED; FEA	ALB; SPR	ALB; FEA	IMO; SPR	IMO; FEA	MCO; SPR	MCO; FEA	CAT; SPR	CAT; FEA	RBR; SPR	RBR; FEA	SIL; SPR	SIL; FEA	HUN; SPR	HUN; FEA	SPA; SPR	SPA; FEA	MNZ; SPR	MNZ; FEA	BAK; SPR	BAK; FEA	LUS; SPR	LUS; FEA	YAS; SPR	YAS; FEA		8th	171
2024	(Barbados) Zane Maloney	1	1	4	7	10	3	3	11	Ret	10	20	7	17	Ret	2	2	13	Ret	4	6	5	2^{P}	10	15	6	9				8th	171
2024	(Italy) Leonardo Fornaroli																											10	13		8th	171
2024	(Japan) Ritomo Miyata	9	9	12	15	5	5	13	15	17	15	7^{F}	13	22^{F}	Ret	10	17	12	8	15	7	13	14	Ret	13	13	10	11	10		8th	171
2025		ALB; SPR	ALB; FEA	BHR; SPR	BHR; FEA	JED; SPR	JED; FEA	IMO; SPR	IMO; FEA	MCO; SPR	MCO; FEA	CAT; SPR	CAT; FEA	RBR; SPR	RBR; FEA	SIL; SPR	SIL; FEA	SPA; SPR	SPA; FEA	HUN; SPR	HUN; FEA	MNZ; SPR	MNZ; FEA	BAK; SPR	BAK; FEA	LUS; SPR	LUS; FEA	YAS; SPR	YAS; FEA		7th	155
2025	(Belgium) Amaury Cordeel	15	C	11	13	14	15	20	15	14	8	10	13	13†	Ret	19	17	Ret	10	16	Ret	17	13	16	16						7th	155
2025	(Norway) Martinius Stenshorne																									7	15	21†	15		7th	155
2025	(Republic of Ireland) Alex Dunne	9	C	19	1	3	8	5	1	9	Ret^{P}	2^{F}	5^{F}	6	DSQ	Ret	2	7	9^{P}	2	9	13	Ret	3	Ret	5	3	8	Ret		7th	155
2026		ALB; SPR	ALB; FEA	MIA; SPR	MIA; FEA	MTL; SPR	MTL; FEA	MCO; SPR	MCO; FEA	CAT; SPR	CAT; FEA	RBR; SPR	RBR; FEA	SIL; SPR	SIL; FEA	SPA; SPR	SPA; FEA	HUN; SPR	HUN; FEA	MNZ; SPR	MNZ; FEA	MAD; SPR	MAD; FEA	BAK; SPR	BAK; FE1	BAK; FE2	LUS; SPR	LUS; FEA	YAS; SPR	YAS; FEA	3rd	296*
2026	(Norway) Martinius Stenshorne	10^{F}	Ret	6	Ret	3	1	6	5	18	17	14	19	20	DNS	2^{F}	10	8	21^{F}	6	15	5	8	4	2	4^{P}					3rd	296*
2026	(Republic of Ireland) Alex Dunne	3	Ret	3	Ret	13^{F}	2	9	2	8	2	4	6	9	4	5	4	19	11	7	6	7	2^{F}	3	1^{P F}	3					3rd	296*

* Season still in progress.

=== FIA Formula 3 ===
Year	Chassis	Engine	Tyres	Driver	Races	Wins	Poles	F. Laps	Podiums	D.C.	Pts	T.C.	Pts
2024	Dallara; F3 2019	Mecachrome; V634 V6	P	(United Kingdom) Callum Voisin	20	1	1	1	2	12th	67	8th	85
2024	Dallara; F3 2019	Mecachrome; V634 V6	P	(Poland) Piotr Wiśnicki	20	0	0	1	0	23rd	10	8th	85
2024	Dallara; F3 2019	Mecachrome; V634 V6	P	(United Kingdom) Joseph Loake	20	0	0	1	0	26th	8	8th	85
2025	Dallara; F3 2025	Mecachrome; V634 V6	P	(United Kingdom) Callum Voisin	19	0	0	0	1	14th	52	6th	128
2025	Dallara; F3 2025	Mecachrome; V634 V6	P	(New Zealand) Louis Sharp	19	0	0	0	0	26th	11	6th	128
2025	Dallara; F3 2025	Mecachrome; V634 V6	P	(Poland) Roman Bilinski	19	1	0	0	3	11th	65	6th	128
2026	Dallara; F3 2025	Mecachrome; V634 V6	P	(Brazil) Pedro Clerot	19	1	0	0	5	6th	88	6th	161
2026	Dallara; F3 2025	Mecachrome; V634 V6	P	(Italy) Brando Badoer	19	1	0	0	4	8th	71	6th	161
2026	Dallara; F3 2025	Mecachrome; V634 V6	P	(Singapore) Christian Ho	16	0	0	0	0	26th	2	6th	161
2026	Dallara; F3 2025	Mecachrome; V634 V6	P	(Italy) Niccolò Maccagnani	3	0	0	0	0	34th	0	6th	161

==== In detail ====
(key)

Year	Drivers	1	2	3	4	5	6	7	8	9	10	11	12	13	14	15	16	17	18	19	20	T.C.	Points
2024		BHR; SPR	BHR; FEA	ALB; SPR	ALB; FEA	IMO; SPR	IMO; FEA	MCO; SPR	MCO; FEA	CAT; SPR	CAT; FEA	RBR; SPR	RBR; FEA	SIL; SPR	SIL; FEA	HUN; SPR	HUN; FEA	SPA; SPR	SPA; FEA	MNZ; SPR	MNZ; FEA	8th	85
2024	(United Kingdom) Callum Voisin	17	21	18	21	Ret	29	12	13	Ret	16	14	25	4	3	6	6	7	1^{P F}	25	22†	8th	85
2024	(Poland) Piotr Wiśnicki	25	25	23	23	20	23	21	25	24	24	23	19^{F}	14	5	24	21	21	24	Ret	Ret	8th	85
2024	(United Kingdom) Joseph Loake	27	23	14	Ret	21	25	5	9	15	22	19	24	15	24	26^{F}	26	11	25	15	19	8th	85
2025		ALB; SPR	ALB; FEA	BHR; SPR	BHR; FEA	IMO; SPR	IMO; FEA	MCO; SPR	MCO; FEA	CAT; SPR	CAT; FEA	RBR; SPR	RBR; FEA	SIL; SPR	SIL; FEA	SPA; SPR	SPA; FEA	HUN; SPR	HUN; FEA	MNZ; SPR	MNZ; FEA	6th	128
2025	(United Kingdom) Callum Voisin	9	Ret	4	2	26	18	10	4	16	10	8	8	22	19	17	C	18	15	7	12	6th	128
2025	(New Zealand) Louis Sharp	18	14	14	23	4	12	9	9	13	12	Ret	16	21	Ret	25	C	16	11	21	Ret	6th	128
2025	(Poland) Roman Bilinski	3	9	20	13	5	8	11	2	Ret	Ret	15	23	10	4	13	C	14	14	1	7	6th	128
2026		ALB; SPR	ALB; FEA	MCO; SPR	MCO; FEA	CAT; SPR	CAT; FEA	RBR; SPR	RBR; FEA	SIL; SPR	SIL; FEA	SPA; SPR	SPA; FEA	HUN; SPR	HUN; FEA	MNZ; SPR	MNZ; FEA	MAD; SPR	MAD; FE1	MAD; FE2		6th	161
2026	(Brazil) Pedro Clerot	14	8	3	8	13	16	2	4	20	9	3	12	21	15	Ret	21	11	1	3		6th	161
2026	(Italy) Brando Badoer	3	16	Ret	1	10	4	21	21	19	17	2	14	5	3	23	24	21	17	11		6th	161
2026	(Singapore) Christian Ho	18	21	Ret	16	26	28	22	16	30	26	11	24	22	9	18	13					6th	161
2026	(Italy) Niccolò Maccagnani																	28	18	24		6th	161

* Season still in progress.

=== Formula Regional European Championship ===
Year	Chassis	Engine	Tyres	Drivers	Races	Wins	Poles	F. Laps	Podiums	D.C.	Pts	T.C.	Pts
2026	Tatuus T-326	Toyota; G16E	P	(Australia) Alex Ninovic	19	0	0	2	1	10th	64	5th	144
2026	Tatuus T-326	Toyota; G16E	P	(United Kingdom) Reza Seewooruthun	19	0	0	0	2	16th	32	5th	144
2026	Tatuus T-326	Toyota; G16E	P	(Brazil) Gabriel Gomez	19	0	0	0	0	14th	48	5th	144

==== In detail ====
(key)

Year	Drivers	1	2	3	4	5	6	7	8	9	10	11	12	13	14	15	16	17	18	19	20	T.C.	Points
2026		RBR; 1	RBR; 2	RBR; 3	ZAN; 1	ZAN; 2	SPA; 1	SPA; 2	SPA; 3	MNZ; 1	MNZ; 2	MNZ; 3	HUN; 1	HUN; 2	LEC; 1	LEC; 2	IMO; 1	IMO; 2	IMO; 3	HOC; 1	HOC; 2	5th	141*
2026	(Australia) Alex Ninovic	12^{F}	17	2^{F}	6	15	7	C	6	Ret	24	19	8	4	9	8	Ret	25	13	10	DSQ	5th	141*
2026	(United Kingdom) Reza Seewooruthun	28	2	19	12	12	8	C	12	Ret	18	17	3	9	16	14	12	13	14	9	14	5th	141*
2026	(Brazil) Gabriel Gomez	Ret	15	7	11	21	9	C	17	9	10	4	24	10	4	4	13	15	Ret	22	18	5th	141*

=== GB3 Championship ===
Year	Car	Drivers	Races	Wins	Poles	F/Laps	Podiums	Points	D.C.	T.C.
2024	Tatuus-Cosworth MSV-022	(New Zealand) Louis Sharp	23	5	5	1	10	478	1st	1st
2024	Tatuus-Cosworth MSV-022	(France) Arthur Rogeon	23	3	0	1	4	258	8th	1st
2024	Tatuus-Cosworth MSV-022	(United States) Ugo Ugochukwu	11	0	0	0	3	185	13th	1st
2024	Tatuus-Cosworth MSV-022	(United Kingdom) James Hedley†	14	0	0	0	2	151	15th	1st
2024	Tatuus-Cosworth MSV-022	(United Kingdom) Freddie Slater	3	0	0	0	0	51	22nd	1st
2024	Tatuus-Cosworth MSV-022	(United Kingdom) Callum Voisin	3	0	0	1	1	40	24th	1st
2025	Tatuus-Cosworth MSV-025	(Australia) Alex Ninovic	24	9	10	10	11	524	1st	1st
2025	Tatuus-Cosworth MSV-025	(Australia) Gianmarco Pradel	24	2	0	2	9	364	4th	1st
2025	Tatuus-Cosworth MSV-025	(United Kingdom) Abbi Pulling	24	0	0	0	1	231	10th	1st
2026	Tatuus-Cosworth MSV-2026	(Hungary) Martin Molnar	22	0	2	1	7	377	4th	2nd
2026	Tatuus-Cosworth MSV-2026	(Germany) Maxim Rehm	23	0	0	1	6	340	5th	2nd
2026	Tatuus-Cosworth MSV-2026	(United Kingdom) Abbi Pulling	23	1	1	0	4	261	8th	2nd

* Season still in progress

† Hedley drove for VRD by Arden until round 2 and for Chris Dittmann Racing in round 8.

=== F4 British Championship ===
F4 British Championship results
Year	Car	Drivers	Races	Wins	Poles	F/Laps	Podiums	Points	D.C.	T.C.
2024	Tatuus F4-T421	(Australia) Alex Ninovic	30	5	4	5	18	357	2nd	2nd
2024	Tatuus F4-T421	(United Kingdom) James Higgins	30	2	1	0	7	268.5	4th	2nd
2024	Tatuus F4-T421	(United Kingdom) Jack Sherwood	29	0	0	1	8	230	5th	2nd
2024	Tatuus F4-T421	(United Kingdom) Abbi Pulling	23	1	0	1	3	130	7th	2nd
2025	Tatuus F4-T421	(Australia) James Piszcyk	30	6	4	2	10	311	2nd	1st
2025	Tatuus F4-T421	(United Arab Emirates) Adam Al Azhari	30	3	0	3	6	199	6th	1st
2025	Tatuus F4-T421	(United Kingdom) Ella Lloyd	21	0	0	0	1	52	14th	1st
2025	Tatuus F4-T421	(Belgium) Dries Van Langendonck	9	1	1	0	1	38	21st	1st
2025	Tatuus F4-T421	(Israel) Guy Albag	9	0	0	0	0	10	28th	1st
2025	Tatuus F4-T421	(United Kingdom) Chloe Chong	6	0	0	0	0	2	36th	1st
2026	Tatuus F4-T421	(Belgium) Dries Van Langendonck	27	8	8	5	12	344	1st	2nd
2026	Tatuus F4-T421	(South Africa) Ethan Lennon	30	2	0	1	6	173	6th	2nd
2026	Tatuus F4-T421	(United Kingdom) Alfie Slater	30	0	0	1	0	34	23rd	2nd
2026	Tatuus F4-T421	(United Kingdom) Ella Lloyd	9	0	0	0	0	30	24th	2nd
2026	Tatuus F4-T421	(United Kingdom) Jesse Phillips	3	0	0	0	0	7	34th	2nd
2026	Tatuus F4-T421	(Republic of Ireland) Alex O'Grady	3	0	0	0	0	3	41st	2nd

* Season still in progress

†Hedley drove for Fortec Motorsport until round 5. Bolger drove for JHR Developments in round 10.

=== F4 Spanish Championship ===
F4 Spanish Championship results
Year	Car	Drivers	Races	Wins	Poles	F/Laps	Podiums	Points	D.C.	T.C.
2024	Tatuus F4-T421	(Belgium) Thomas Strauven	18	1	1	2	5	122	7th	5th
2024	Tatuus F4-T421	(Australia) Peter Bouzinelos	21	0	0	0	0	21	16th	5th
2024	Tatuus F4-T421	(Australia) Alex Ninovic	3	0	0	0	0	4	22nd	5th
2024	Tatuus F4-T421	(United States) Preston Lambert	11	0	0	0	0	0	32nd	5th
2024	Tatuus F4-T421	(United Kingdom) Chase Fernandez	6	0	0	0	0	0	NC	5th
2024	Tatuus F4-T421	(India) Ary Bansal	3	0	0	0	0	0	NC	5th
2025	Tatuus F4-T421	(United Kingdom) Nathan Tye	21	1	0	1	2	114	7th	5th
2025	Tatuus F4-T421	(South Korea) Kyuho Lee	18	0	0	0	0	1	22nd	5th
2025	Tatuus F4-T421	(Austria) Emma Felbermayr	18	0	0	0	0	0	29th	5th

=== Formula Winter Series ===
Formula Winter Series results
Year	Car	Drivers	Races	Wins	Poles	F/Laps	Podiums	Points	D.C.	T.C.
2024	Tatuus F4-T421	(Belgium) Thomas Strauven	11	1	0	0	1	30	12th	5th
2024	Tatuus F4-T421	(United States) Preston Lambert	5	0	0	0	0	0	36th	5th
2024	Tatuus F4-T421	(United Kingdom) Ella Lloyd	5	0	0	0	0	0	41st	5th
2024	Tatuus F4-T421	(United Kingdom) Bart Harrison	6	0	0	0	0	0	42nd	5th
2026	Tatuus F4-T421	(Belgium) Dries Van Langendonck	15	9	9	8	12	308	1st	1st
2026	Tatuus F4-T421	(South Africa) Ethan Lennon	15	0	2	0	4	105	5th	1st
2026	Tatuus F4-T421	(United Kingdom) Alfie Slater	15	0	0	0	3	77	7th	1st
2026	Tatuus F4-T421	(United Kingdom) Ella Stevens	3	0	0	0	0	0	NC	1st

=== F1 Academy ===
F1 Academy results
Year	Car	Drivers	Races	Wins	Poles	F/Laps	Podiums	Points	D.C.	T.C.
2024	Tatuus F4-T421	(United Kingdom) Abbi Pulling	14	9	10	6	14	338	1st	2nd
2024	Tatuus F4-T421	(United Kingdom) Jessica Edgar	14	0	0	0	0	28	13th	2nd
2024	Tatuus F4-T421	(France) Lola Lovinfosse	14	0	0	0	0	19	14th	2nd
2025	Tatuus F4-T421	(United Kingdom) Ella Lloyd	14	1	0	0	5	109	4th	4th
2025	Tatuus F4-T421	(Austria) Emma Felbermayr	14	1	0	0	1	37	10th	4th
2025	Tatuus F4-T421	(United Kingdom) Chloe Chong	14	0	0	0	0	18	11th	4th
2026	Tatuus F4-T421	(Austria) Emma Felbermayr								
2026	Tatuus F4-T421	(United Kingdom) Ella Lloyd								
2026	Tatuus F4-T421	(United Kingdom) Ella Stevens								

* Season still in progress.

== Timeline ==
Current series
F4 British Championship	2024–present
GB3 Championship	2024–present
FIA Formula 2 Championship	2024–present
FIA Formula 3 Championship	2024–present
F1 Academy	2024–present
Formula Winter Series	2024, 2026–present
Formula Regional Middle East Trophy	2026–present
Formula Regional European Championship	2026–present
British GT Championship	2026–present
Former series
F4 Spanish Championship	2024–2025
