= Bart Harrison =

British racing driver (born 2007)

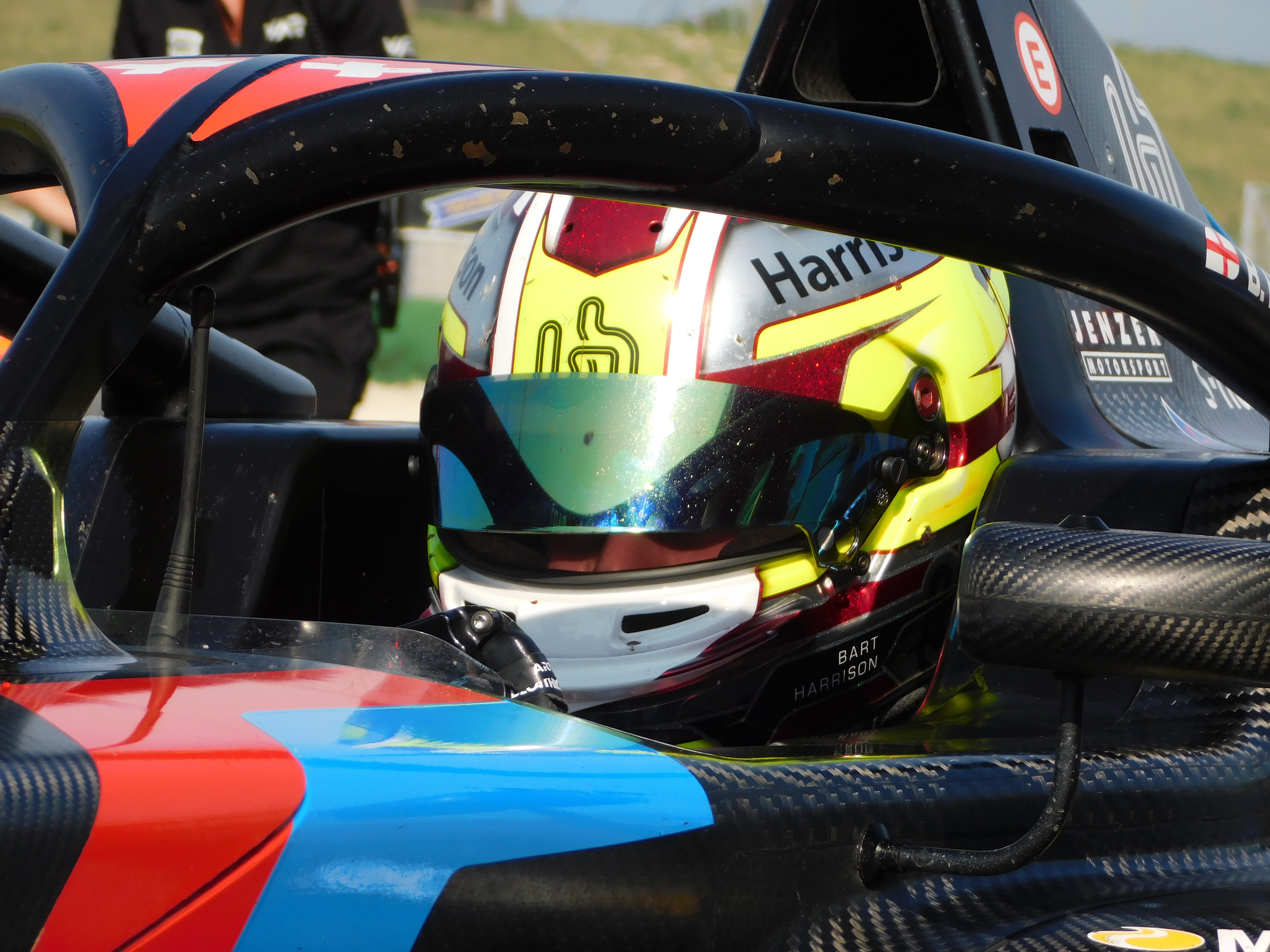
- Harrison in 2025
- Born: 9 August 2007 (age 19); Nunnington, England
- Nationality: (United Kingdom) British

Indy NXT career
- Debut season: 2026
- Current team: AJ Foyt Racing
- Car number: 77
- Former teams: HMD Motorsports
- Starts: 3
- Wins: 0
- Podiums: 0
- Poles: 0
- Fastest laps: 0
- Best finish: 27th in 2026

Previous series
- 2026 2026 2025 2025 2025 2024–2025 2024 2024–2025: Eurocup-3; Eurocup-3 Spanish Winter; GB3; E4; F4 CEZ; Italian F4; F4 British; Formula Winter Series
- Statistics up to date as of 10 November 2026.

Bart Harrison (born 9 August 2007) is a British racing driver who is set to compete in the Indy NXT with A.J. Foyt Racing.

== Career ==
=== Karting ===
Born in Nunnington, Harrison began karting at the age of eight. During his karting career, Harrison won the IAME Winter Cup in the X30 Junior class in both 2020 and 2021, whilst also representing Great Britain the same year in the Karting Academy Trophy.

=== Formula 4 ===
==== 2024 ====
Harrison stepped up to single-seaters in 2024, joining Rodin Motorsport for the first two rounds of the Formula Winter Series. After taking a best result of 21st in race two at Jerez, Harrison joined Chris Dittmann Racing for the rest of the year as he made his debut in the F4 British Championship. Starting off the season by taking three top 10s in the first two rounds, which included a rookie win at Donington Park, Harrison was then disqualified from all three races at Snetterton after physically assaulting Mika Abrahams, and was also excluded from the round at Thruxton as a result.

Returning at Silverstone, Harrison took two rookie podiums as he finished sixth and ninth overall in the final two races of the weekend, before matching his season-best result two rounds later at Knockhill, in which he finished all three races on the rookie podium. After taking one more points finish in the last three rounds, a seventh-place in race one at Brands Hatch, Harrison ended the year 20th in the overall standings, on 24 points. In late 2024, Harrison also made a one-off appearance in the Italian F4 Championship for Jenzer Motorsport at Monza, taking a best result of 15th in race one.

==== 2025 ====
Returning to Jenzer for 2025, Harrison joined them to race in the Formula Winter Series, Italian F4 and E4 Championships. In the former, Harrison took his maiden single-seater podiums by finishing third in the final two races of the season at Barcelona on his way to seventh in points, before then making a one-off appearance in the Formula 4 CEZ Championship at the Red Bull Ring, winning the first two races and finishing third in race three. In Italian F4, Harrison started off the season by taking four points finishes in the first two rounds, with a best result of sixth at Vallelunga, before scoring his maiden series podium in the following round at Monza by finishing third in race three. Following that, Harrison had to wait until Misano to score his next and final points of the season, by finishing seventh in race three en route to a 14th-place points finish.

=== Formula Regional ===
==== 2025 ====
During 2025, Harrison stepped up to GB3, joining JHR Developments for the final two rounds of the season at Donington Park and Monza. On his debut round, Harrison finished second in race three to secure his first and only podium of the season, helping him end his part-time stint 28th in points.

==== 2026 ====
The following year, Harrison joined Double R Racing to race in the Eurocup-3 Spanish Winter Championship and the main series. In the former, Harrison scored a best result of 15th in the Aragón sprint en route to a 27th-place points finish, whereas in the main series, he took a best result of sixth at Silverstone to finish the year 18th overall.

=== Indy NXT ===
==== 2026 ====
In August 2026, Harrison joined HMD Motorsports in Indy NXT for the season's Portland and Laguna Seca rounds in place of Salvador de Alba, in which he took a best result of tenth on debut.

==== 2027 ====
Harrison will compete in Indy NXT for a full season in 2027, joining A.J. Foyt Racing.

== Karting record ==
=== Karting career summary ===
Season	Series	Team	Position
2019	British Kart Championship – X30 Mini	Fusion Motorsport	6th
2019	IAME Euro Series – X30 Mini	Fusion Motorsport	27th
2019	Kartmasters British Grand Prix – X30 Mini	Fusion Motorsport	6th
2020	IAME Winter Cup – X30 Junior	Mick Barrett Racing	1st
2020	IAME Euro Series – X30 Junior	Mick Barrett Racing	6th
2020	IAME International Games – X30 Junior	Mick Barrett Racing	33rd
2021	IAME Winter Cup – X30 Junior	Mick Barrett Racing	1st
2021	British Kart Championship – X30 Junior	Mick Barrett Racing	2nd
2021	LGM Series – X30 Junior	Mick Barrett Racing	24th
2021	IAME Warriors Final – X30 Junior	Mick Barrett Racing	5th
2021	Karting Academy Trophy	Harrison, Martyn	8th
2022	IAME Winter Cup – X30 Senior	Mick Barrett Racing	4th
2022	British Kart Championship – X30 Senior	Mick Barrett Racing	2nd
2022	LGM Series – X30 Senior	Mick Barrett Racing	19th
2022	IAME Euro Series – X30 Senior	Mick Barrett Racing	14th
2022	Kartmasters British Grand Prix – X30 Senior	Mick Barrett Racing	4th
2022	IAME Warriors Final – X30 Senior	Mick Barrett Racing	20th
2022	Italian Karting Championship – X30 Senior		19th
2023	IAME Winter Cup – X30 Senior	Mick Barrett Racing	35th
2023	IAME Euro Series – X30 Senior	Mick Barrett Racing	28th

== Racing record ==
=== Racing career summary ===
Season	Series	Team	Races	Wins	Poles	F/Laps	Podiums	Points	Position
2024	Formula Winter Series	Rodin Motorsport	3	0	0	0	0	0	42nd
2024	F4 British Championship	Chris Dittmann Racing	27	0	0	0	0	24	20th
2024	Italian F4 Championship	Jenzer Motorsport	3	0	0	0	0	0	37th
2025	Formula Winter Series	Jenzer Motorsport	12	0	0	0	2	68	7th
2025	Formula 4 CEZ Championship	Jenzer Motorsport	3	2	1	1	3	65	10th
2025	Italian F4 Championship	Jenzer Motorsport	20	0	0	0	1	36	14th
2025	E4 Championship	Jenzer Motorsport	3	0	0	0	0	1	22nd
2025	GB3 Championship	JHR Developments	6	0	0	1	1	34	28th
2026	Eurocup-3 Spanish Winter Championship	Double R Racing	9	0	0	0	0	0	27th
2026	Eurocup-3	Double R Racing	17	0	0	0	0	16	18th
2026	Indy NXT	HMD Motorsports	3	0	0	0	0	51	27th
2027	Indy NXT	AJ Foyt Racing	0	0	0	0	0	0	TBD

* Season still in progress.

=== Complete Formula Winter Series results ===
(key) (Races in bold indicate pole position) (Races in italics indicate fastest lap)

Year	Team	1	2	3	4	5	6	7	8	9	10	11	12	DC	Points
2024	Rodin Motorsport	JER; 1; 24	JER; 2; 21	JER; 3 Ret	CRT; 1; 23	CRT; 2; 23	CRT; 3; 26	ARA; 1	ARA; 2	ARA; 3	CAT; 1	CAT; 2	CAT; 3	42nd	0
2025	Jenzer Motorsport	POR; 1; 7	POR; 2; 8	POR; 3; 7	CRT; 1; 9	CRT; 2; 11	CRT; 3; 9	ARA; 1 Ret	ARA; 2; 5	ARA; 3; 6	CAT; 1 Ret	CAT; 2; 3	CAT; 3; 3	7th	68

=== Complete F4 British Championship results ===
(key) (Races in bold indicate pole position) (Races in italics indicate fastest lap)

Year	Team	1	2	3	4	5	6	7	8	9	10	11	12	13	14	15	16	17	18	19	20	21	22	23	24	25	26	27	28	29	30	31	32	DC	Points
2024	Chris Dittmann Racing	DPN; 1; 10	DPN; 2; 9^{8}	DPN; 3 C	BHI; 1; 13	BHI; 2; 11^{6}	BHI; 3; 9	SNE; 1 DSQ	SNE; 2 DSQ	SNE; 3 DSQ	THR; 1	THR; 2	THR; 3	SILGP; 1; 17	SILGP; 2; 6	SILGP; 3; 9	ZAN; 1; 14	ZAN; 2; 16	ZAN; 3; 19	KNO; 1; 9	KNO; 2; 6^{1}	KNO; 3; 6	DPGP; 1; 11	DPGP; 2; 11	DPGP; 3; 14^{2}	DPGP; 4; 15	SILN; 1; 21	SILN; 2 C	SILN; 3; 15	BHGP; 1; 7	BHGP; 2; 11^{5}	BHGP; 3; 18	BHGP; 4; 15	20th	24

=== Complete Italian F4 Championship results ===
(key) (Races in bold indicate pole position; races in italics indicate fastest lap)

Year	Team	1	2	3	4	5	6	7	8	9	10	11	12	13	14	15	16	17	18	19	20	21	22	23	24	25	DC	Points
2024	Jenzer Motorsport	MIS; 1	MIS; 2	MIS; 3	IMO; 1	IMO; 2	IMO; 3	VLL; 1	VLL; 2	VLL; 3	MUG; 1	MUG; 2	MUG; 3	LEC; 1	LEC; 2	LEC; 3	CAT; 1	CAT; 2	CAT; 3	MNZ; 1; 15	MNZ; 2; 30†	MNZ; 3; 18					37th	0
2025	Jenzer Motorsport	MIS1; 1	MIS1; 2; 9	MIS1; 3; 13	MIS1; 4; 10	VLL; 1 Ret	VLL; 2	VLL; 3; 8	VLL; 4; 6	MNZ; 1 Ret	MNZ; 2; 33†	MNZ; 3; 3	MUG; 1; 19	MUG; 2; 15	MUG; 3; 21	IMO; 1; 30	IMO; 2 C	IMO; 3; 27†	CAT; 1; 22	CAT; 2; 21	CAT; 3 C	MIS2; 1	MIS2; 2; 23	MIS2; 3; 7	MIS2; 4; 31	MIS2; 5; 12	14th	36

=== Complete Formula 4 CEZ Championship results ===
(key) (Races in bold indicate pole position) (Races in italics indicate fastest lap)

Year	Team	1	2	3	4	5	6	7	8	9	10	11	12	13	14	15	16	17	18	DC	Points
2025	Jenzer Motorsport	**RBR1**; **1**; 1	RBR1; 2; 1	RBR1; 3; 3	RBR2; 1	RBR2; 2	RBR2; 3	SAL; 1	SAL; 2	SAL; 3	MOS; 1	MOS; 2	MOS; 3	SVK; 1	SVK; 2	SVK; 3	BRN; 1	BRN; 2	BRN; 3	10th	65

=== Complete E4 Championship results ===
(key) (Races in bold indicate pole position; races in italics indicate fastest lap)

Year	Team	1	2	3	4	5	6	7	8	9	DC	Points
2025	Jenzer Motorsport	LEC; 1; 12	LEC; 2; 10	LEC; 3; 15	MUG; 1	MUG; 2	MUG; 3	MNZ; 1	MNZ; 2	MNZ; 3	22nd	1

=== Complete GB3 Championship results ===
(key) (Races in bold indicate pole position) (Races in italics indicate fastest lap)

Year	Team	1	2	3	4	5	6	7	8	9	10	11	12	13	14	15	16	17	18	19	20	21	22	23	24	DC	Points
2025	JHR Developments	SIL1; 1	SIL1; 2	SIL1; 3	ZAN; 1	ZAN; 2	ZAN; 3	SPA; 1	SPA; 2	SPA; 3	HUN; 1	HUN; 2	HUN; 3	SIL2; 1	SIL2; 2	SIL2; 3	BRH; 1	BRH; 2	BRH; 3	DON; 1; 13	DON; 2; 15	DON; 3; 2^{1}	MNZ; 1 Ret	MNZ; 2 Ret	MNZ; 3; 18^{2}	28th	34

=== Complete Eurocup-3 Spanish Winter Championship results ===
(key) (Races in bold indicate pole position) (Races in italics indicate fastest lap)

Year	Team	1	2	3	4	5	6	7	8	9	DC	Points
2026	Double R Racing	POR; 1; 16	POR; SP; 17	POR; 2; 18	JAR; 1; 24†	JAR; SR; 17	JAR; 2; 19	ARA; 1 Ret	ARA; SR; 15	ARA; 2 Ret	27th	0

=== Complete Eurocup-3 results ===
(key) (Races in bold indicate pole position; races in italics indicate fastest lap)

Year	Team	1	2	3	4	5	6	7	8	9	10	11	12	13	14	15	16	17	18	19	DC	Points
2026	Double R Racing	LEC; 1; 15	LEC; SR; 14	LEC; 2; 18	POR; 1; 7	POR; 2; 14	IMO; 1; 23	IMO; SR; 17	IMO; 2; 14	MNZ; 1; 9	MNZ; 2 Ret	SIL; 1; 17	SIL; 2; 6	JER; 1; 15	JER; SR; 19	JER; 2; 14	HUN; 1; 22	HUN; 2; 11	CAT; 1	CAT; 2	18th	16

=== American open-wheel racing results ===
==== Indy NXT ====
(key) (Races in bold indicate pole position) (Races in italics indicate fastest lap) (Races with ^{L} indicate a race lap led) (Races with * indicate most race laps led)

Year	Team	1	2	3	4	5	6	7	8	9	10	11	12	13	14	15	16	17	Rank	Points
2026	HMD Motorsports	STP	ARL	BAR	BAR	IMS	IMS	DET	GAT	ROA	ROA	MOH	MOH	NSS	POR; 10	MIL	LAG; 12	LAG; 17	27th	51

* Season still in progress.
