= Alex Ninovic =

Australian racing driver (born 2007)

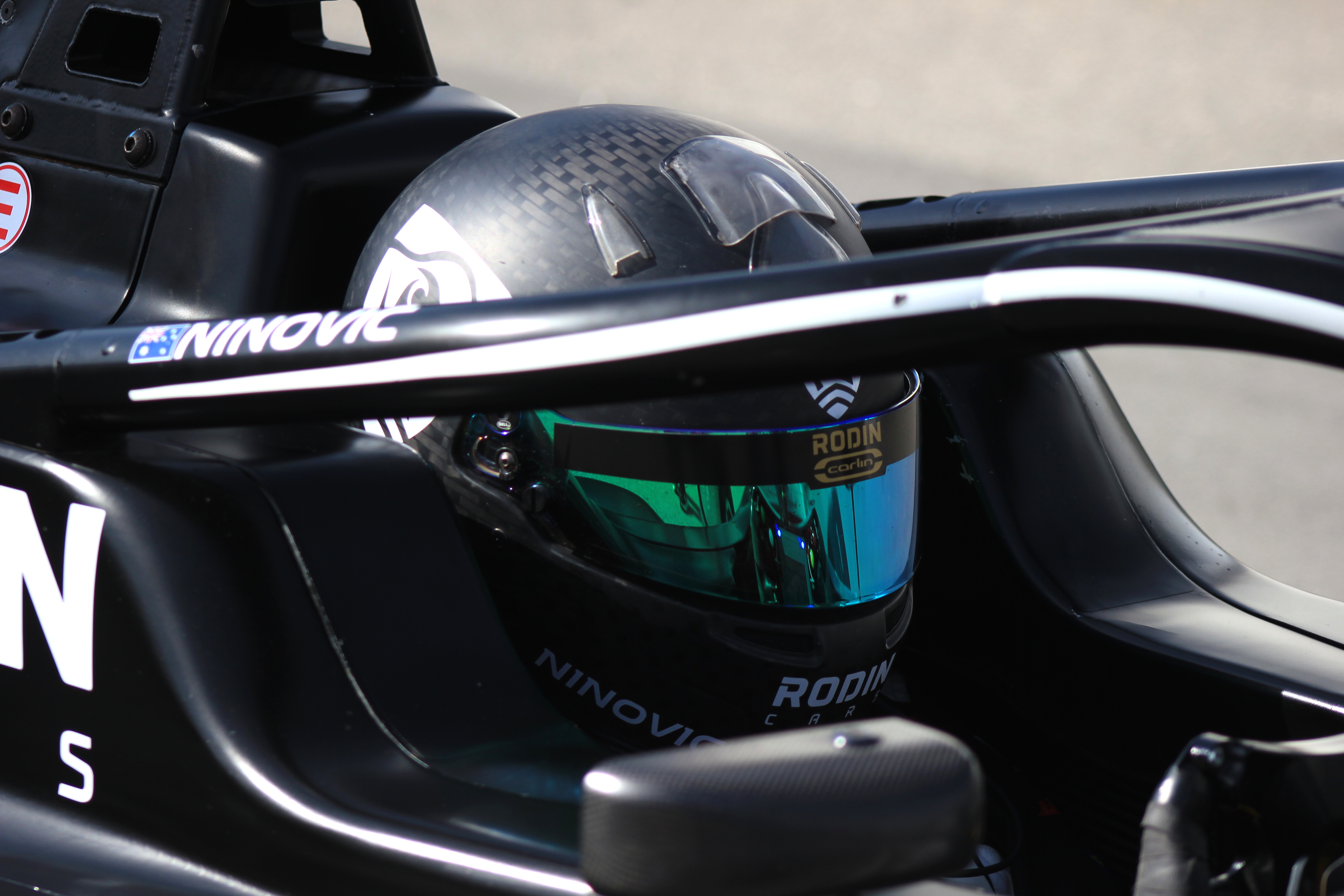
- Ninovic in 2023
- Nationality: Australia
- Born: 5 March 2007 (age 19) Sydney, Australia

Formula Regional European Championship career
- Debut season: 2026
- Current team: Rodin Motorsport
- Car number: 2
- Starts: 19
- Wins: 0
- Podiums: 1
- Poles: 0
- Fastest laps: 2
- Best finish: 10th in 2026

Previous series
- 2026 2025 2024 2023–2024: FR Middle East; GB3; F4 British; F4 Spanish

Championship titles
- 2025: GB3 Championship
- Statistics up to date as of 18 September 2026.

Alex Ninovic (born 5 March 2007) is an Australian racing driver competing in Formula Regional European Championship with Rodin Motorsport.

Ninovic is the winner of the 2025 GB3 Championship and the runner-up in the 2024 F4 British Championship, both with Rodin Motorsport. He is a Rodin sponsored driver.

== Career ==
=== Karting (2016–2022) ===
Ninovic mostly karted in Australia, winning the Australian Junior title in 2021 and the Australian Senior title in 2022. He has a 77% podium rate in his home country. This impressive karting form attracted Rodin Cars, who subsequently sponsored the driver on his step up to cars.

=== Formula 4 (2023–2024) ===
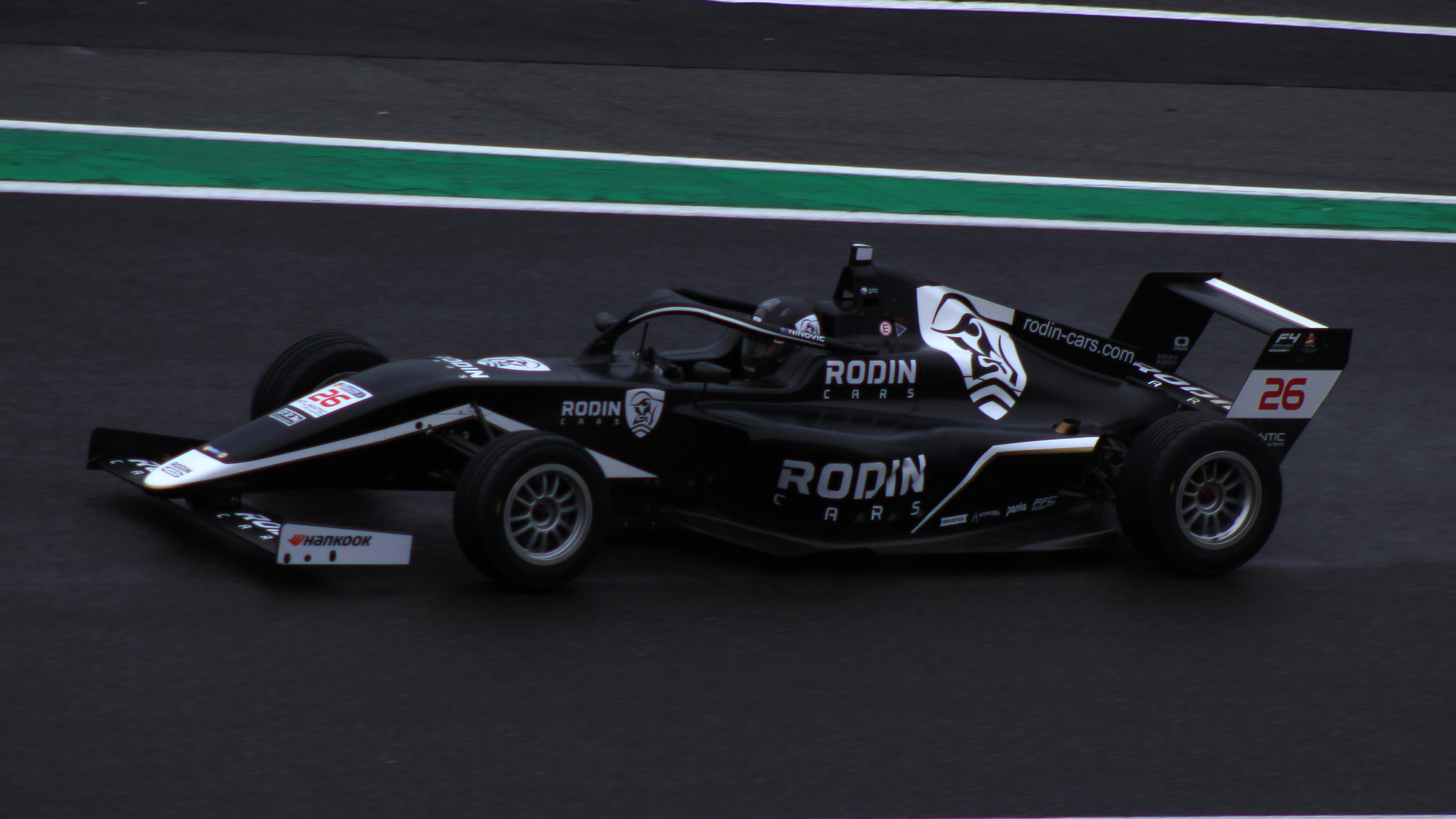
Ninovic driving at Spa-Francorchamps in 2023

In the early part of the year, Ninovic was announced to be competing in the 2023 F4 Spanish Championship with Rodin Carlin, who were to step into the championship as a new team. He had an impressive season, beating fellow Aussie and experienced teammate Noah Lisle in the championship standings, and his other teammate Federico Al Rifai, in the championship standings. He also managed to score Rodin Carlin's only podium of the season at Circuit Ricardo Tormo.

On 8 December 2023, it was confirmed that Ninovic would move from Spanish F4 to British F4 with Rodin Motorsport for the 2024 F4 British Championship. His debut yielded some strong results, with a podium in the first race of the season and a pole position in the eventually cancelled race 3 at Donington Park. He secured his first win at round 3 in Snetterton, winning both races one and three. Ninovic had a very competitive season in the series, securing an impressive eighteen podiums and five victories on his way to second in the standings, only behind Hitech Pulse-Eight driver Deagen Fairclough. He scored 357 points.

=== Formula Regional (2025–present) ===
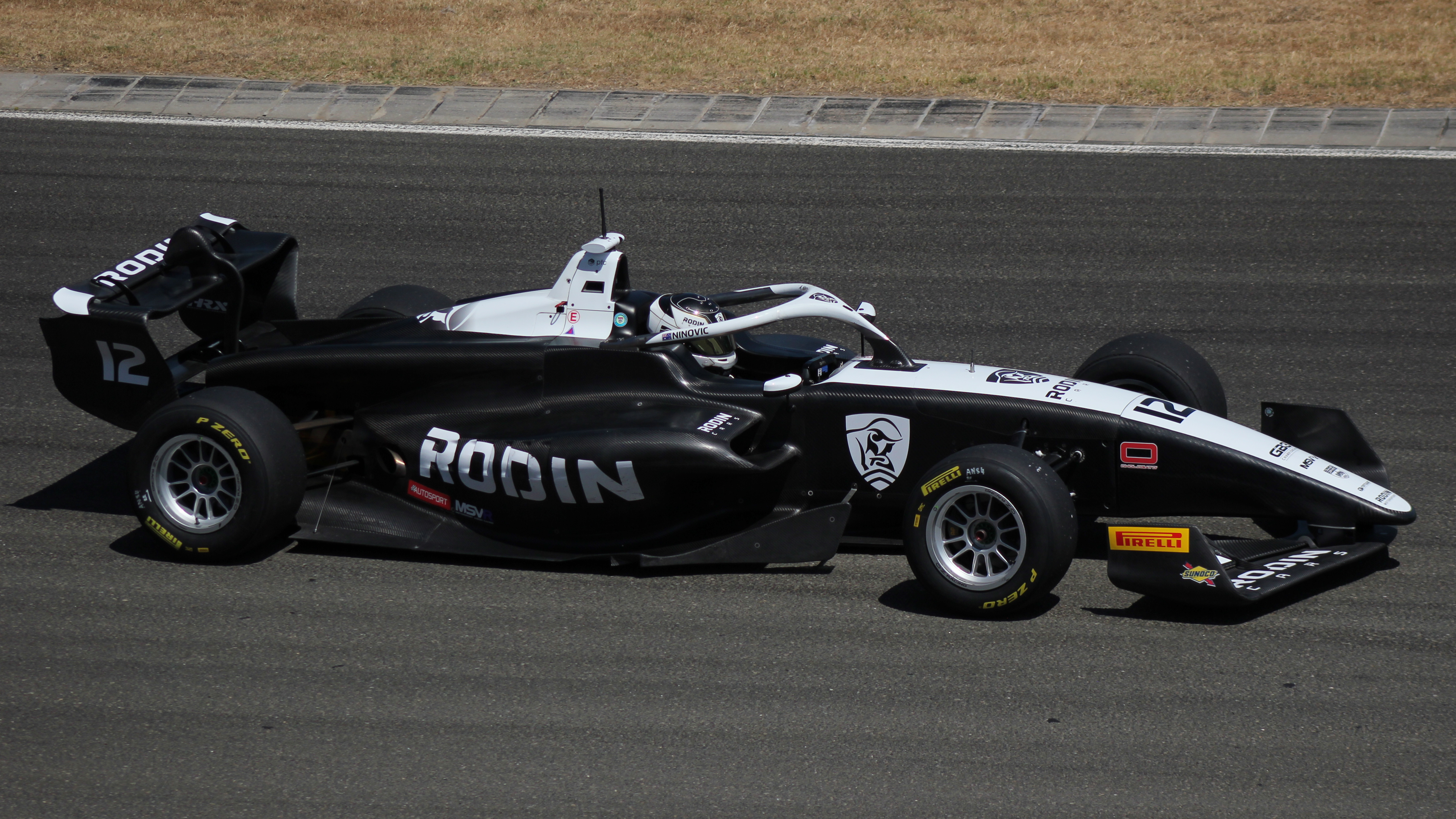
Ninovic driving at the Hungaroring in the 2025 GB3 Championship

In late 2024, Rodin Motorsport announced that Ninovic would be partaking in the 2025 GB3 Championship with the team, the series first season under its new chassis and engine package, the Tatuus MSV GB3-025. His teammates for the season were 2024 F1 Academy champion Abbi Pulling and 2024 Italian F4 frontrunner Gianmarco Pradel. Ninovic took nine wins and 11 podiums and nine poles to take the title in his first year, beating second place Patrick Heuzenroeder by more than 100 points. Rodin Motorsport also claimed the Teams Championship due to Ninovic's season along with his teammates Pradel and Pulling finishing fourth and tenth respectively.

At the start of 2026, Ninovic competed in the Formula Regional Middle East Trophy with Rodin Motorsport. Ninovic moved to the Formula Regional European Championship (FREC) for his main campaign, continuing with Rodin Motorsport. Despite winning the GB3 title the year prior, he preferred getting more development in the Formula Regional category before moving to Formula 3. At the end of the year, he competed in the Macau Grand Prix.

Ninovic will continue to compete in FREC with Rodin Motorsport in 2027.

== Karting record ==
=== Karting career summary ===
Season	Series	Team	Position
2016	Australian Kart Championship - Cadet 9		3rd
2017	Australian Kart Championship - Cadet 12		35th
2018	Australian Kart Championship - Cadet 12		4th
2019	ROK Cup Superfinal - Mini Rok	PCR Factory Team	25th
2019	WSK Open Cup - 60 Mini	PCR Factory Team	106th
2019	Australian Kart Championship - Cadet 12		4th
2020	Australian Kart Championship - KA4 Junior		NC
2021	Australian Kart Championship - KA4 Junior		1st
2021	ROK Cup Superfinal - Junior ROK	PCR Factory Team	19th
2021	Trofeo delle Industrie - X30 Junior	PCR Factory Team	25th
2022	Australian Kart Championship - KA3 Senior		1st

== Racing record ==
=== Racing career summary ===
Season	Series	Team	Races	Wins	Poles	F/Laps	Podiums	Points	Position
2023	F4 Spanish Championship	Rodin Carlin	21	0	0	0	1	54	10th
2024	F4 British Championship	Rodin Motorsport	30	5	4	5	18	357	**2nd**
2024	F4 Spanish Championship	Rodin Motorsport	3	0	0	0	0	4	22nd
2025	GB3 Championship	Rodin Motorsport	24	9	10	10	11	524	**1st**
2026	Formula Regional Middle East Trophy	Rodin Motorsport	11	1	0	0	3	66	8th
2026	Formula Regional European Championship	Rodin Motorsport	19	0	0	2	1	64	10th
2027	Formula Regional European Championship	Rodin Motorsport	0	0	0	0	0	0	TBD

* Season still in progress.

=== Complete F4 Spanish Championship results ===
(key) (Races in bold indicate pole position) (Races in italics indicate fastest lap)

Year	Team	1	2	3	4	5	6	7	8	9	10	11	12	13	14	15	16	17	18	19	20	21	DC	Points
2023	Rodin Carlin	SPA; 1; 5	SPA; 2 Ret	SPA; 3; 10	ARA; 1; 11	ARA; 2; 10	ARA; 3; 11	NAV; 1; 8	NAV; 2; 7	NAV; 3; 8	JER; 1; 14	JER; 2; 29	JER; 3 Ret	EST; 1; 10	EST; 2; 9	EST; 3; 26	CRT; 1; 8	CRT; 2; 5	CRT; 3; 3	CAT; 1; 32†	CAT; 2 Ret	CAT; 3; 9	10th	54
2024	Rodin Motorsport	JAR; 1	JAR; 2	JAR; 3	POR; 1	POR; 2	POR; 3	LEC; 1	LEC; 2	LEC; 3	ARA; 1	ARA; 2	ARA; 3	CRT; 1; 17	CRT; 2 Ret	CRT; 3; 8	JER; 1	JER; 2	JER; 3	CAT; 1	CAT; 2	CAT; 3	22nd	4

=== Complete F4 British Championship results ===
(key) (Races in bold indicate pole position) (Races in italics indicate fastest lap)

Year	Team	1	2	3	4	5	6	7	8	9	10	11	12	13	14	15	16	17	18	19	20	21	22	23	24	25	26	27	28	29	30	31	32	DC	Points
2024	Rodin Motorsport	DPN; 1; 3	DPN; 2; 5^{7}	**DPN**; **3** C	BHI; 1; 2	BHI; 2; 17	BHI; 3 Ret	**SNE**; **1**; 1	SNE; 2; 4^{8}	**SNE**; **3**; 1	THR; 1; 3	THR; 2; 3^{3}	THR; 3; 2	SILGP; 1; 3	SILGP; 2; 3^{5}	SILGP; 3; 3	ZAN; 1; 2	ZAN; 2; 1^{2}	ZAN; 3; 18	KNO; 1; 2	KNO; 2 Ret	KNO; 3; 3	DPGP; 1; 1	**DPGP**; **2**; 7	DPGP; 3; 7^{1}	DPGP; 4; 2	SILN; 1; 20	SILN; 2 C	SILN; 3 Ret	BHGP; 1 Ret	BHGP; 2; 3^{5}	BHGP; 3; 1^{7}	BHGP; 4; 4	2nd	357

=== Complete GB3 Championship results ===
(key) (Races in bold indicate pole position) (Races in italics indicate fastest lap)

Year	Team	1	2	3	4	5	6	7	8	9	10	11	12	13	14	15	16	17	18	19	20	21	22	23	24	DC	Points
2025	Rodin Motorsport	SIL1; 1; 4	SIL1; 2; 5	SIL1; 3 Ret	ZAN; 1; 4	**ZAN**; **2**; 1	ZAN; 3; 9^{3}	**SPA**; **1**; 1	SPA; 2; 3	SPA; 3 Ret	HUN; 1; 4	**HUN**; **2**; 1	HUN; 3; 8^{4}	**SIL2**; **1**; 1	**SIL2**; **2**; 21	SIL2; 3; 4^{7}	**BRH**; **1**; 1	**BRH**; **2**; 1	BRH; 3; 12	**DON**; **1**; 1	DON; 2; 1	DON; 3; 7^{5}	**MNZ**; **1**; 1	**MNZ**; **2**; 2	MNZ; 3; 7^{5}	1st	524

=== Complete Formula Regional Middle East Trophy results ===
(key) (Races in bold indicate pole position) (Races in italics indicate fastest lap)

Year	Entrant	1	2	3	4	5	6	7	8	9	10	11	12	DC	Points
2026	Rodin Motorsport	YMC1; 1; 7	YMC1; 2; 3	YMC1; 3; 18	YMC2; 1; 12	YMC2; 2; 1	YMC2; 3; 13	DUB; 1; 9	DUB; 2; 2	DUB; 3; 26	LUS; 1; 15	LUS; 2 C	LUS; 3; 18	8th	66

=== Complete Formula Regional European Championship results ===
(key) (Races in bold indicate pole position; races in italics indicate fastest lap)

Year	Entrant	1	2	3	4	5	6	7	8	9	10	11	12	13	14	15	16	17	18	19	20	Pos	Points
2026	Rodin Motorsport	RBR; 1; 12	RBR; 2; 17	RBR; 3; 2	ZAN; 1; 6	ZAN; 2; 15	SPA; 1; 7	SPA; 2 C	SPA; 3; 6	MNZ; 1 Ret	MNZ; 2; 24	MNZ; 3; 19	HUN; 1; 8	HUN; 2; 4	LEC; 1; 9	LEC; 2; 8	IMO; 1 Ret	IMO; 2; 25	IMO; 3; 13	HOC; 1; 10	HOC; 2 DSQ	10th	64
2027	Rodin Motorsport	POR; 1	POR; 2	RBR; 1	RBR; 2	SIL; 1	SIL; 2	SPA; 1	SPA; 2	LEC; 1	LEC; 2	HUN; 1	HUN; 2	ZAN; 1	ZAN; 2	IMO; 1	IMO; 2	MNZ; 1	MNZ; 2	CAT; 1	CAT; 2	TBD	TBD

=== Complete Macau Grand Prix results ===
Year	Team	Car	Qualifying	Quali Race	Main Race
2026	(New Zealand) Rodin Motorsport	Tatuus T-326	**1**	**3rd**	**2nd**

Sporting positions
Preceded by Louis Sharp	GB3 Championship; Champion; 2025	Succeeded by Nikita Bedrin
