= Abbi Pulling =

British racing driver (born 2003)

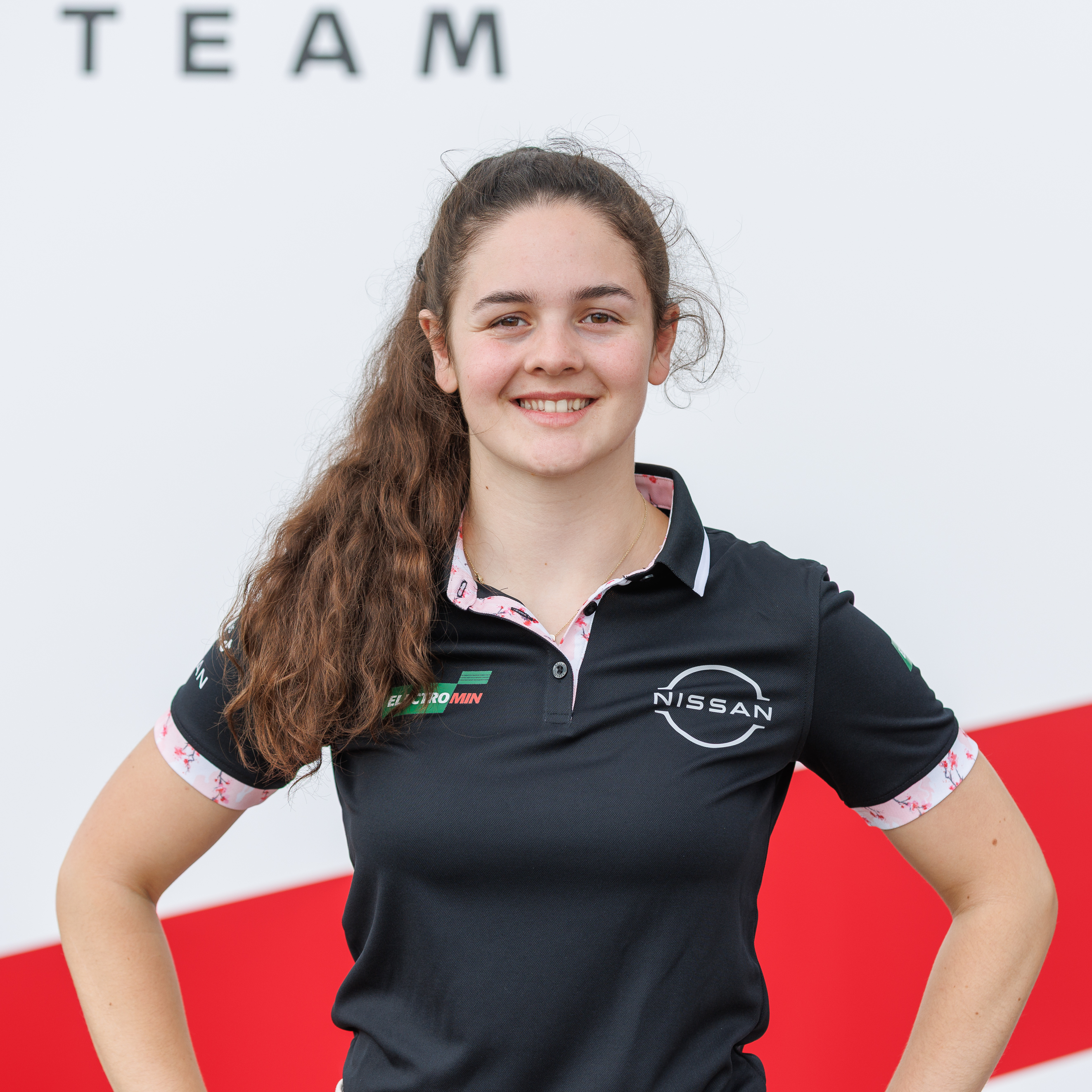
- Pulling at the 2025 Berlin ePrix
- Nationality: (United Kingdom) British
- Born: Abbi Jo Pulling; 21 March 2003 (age 23) Gosberton, Lincolnshire, England

GB3 Championship career
- Debut season: 2025
- Current team: Rodin Motorsport
- Categorisation: FIA Silver
- Car number: 9
- Starts: 44
- Wins: 1
- Podiums: 4
- Poles: 1
- Fastest laps: 0
- Best finish: 8th in 2026

Previous series
- 2023–2024; 2021–2022; 2020; 2020–2021, 2024; 2019; 2018: F1 Academy; W Series; Formula Renault Eurocup; F4 British; Ginetta GT5; Ginetta Junior

Championship titles
- 2024; 2017–2018: F1 Academy; Super 1 National Junior

Abbi Jo Pulling (born 21 March 2003) is a British racing driver who last competed in GB3 Championship for Rodin Motorsport. She is also the rookie and simulator driver for the Nissan Formula E Team. Pulling is the 2024 F1 Academy drivers' champion.

== Junior career ==
=== Karting ===
Pulling got involved in motorsports at eight years old and started karting competitively in 2013, at the age of nine. She mainly developed her karting career in Britain, winning the Super 1 National Junior TKM Championship twice in 2017 and 2018.

=== Ginetta Juniors and GT5 Challenge ===
Pulling began her racing career in early 2018, taking part in the first three rounds of the Ginetta Junior Championship for Total Control Racing.

Pulling continued racing in Ginettas the following year as she switched to the Ginetta GT5 Challenge. She got a best result of two consecutive sixth-place finishes at Donington Park.

=== British F4 ===
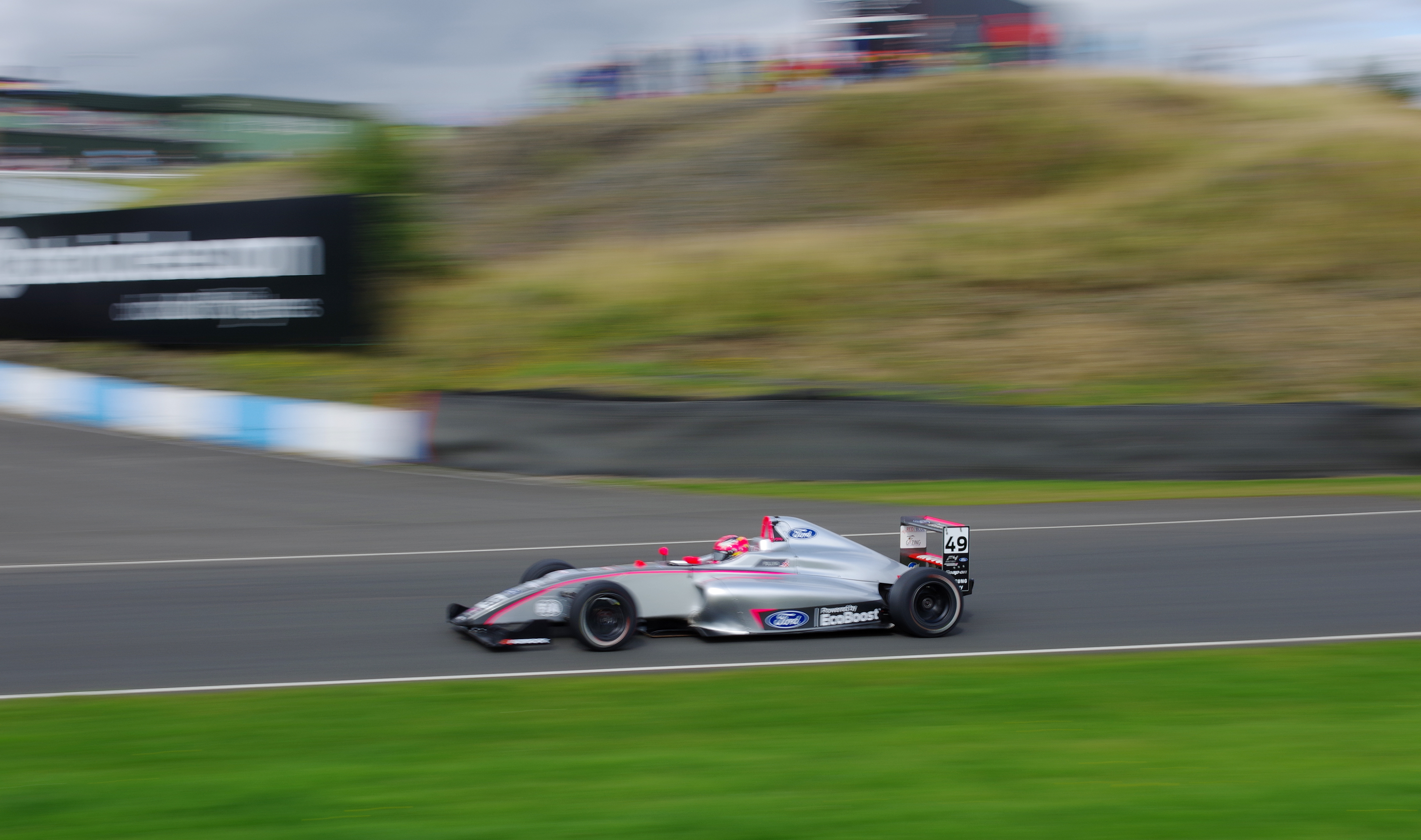
Pulling racing in the F4 British Championship at Knockhill in 2021

In 2020, Pulling made her single-seater debut, racing in the F4 British Championship with JHR Developments. She finished the season sixth in the standings with four podiums to her name.

Pulling re-signed for the team going into the 2021 season with aspirations to fight for the title, but had to pull out in September due to a lack of budget.

Pulling returned for the 2024 season with Rodin Motorsport. She became the first female race winner of the series when she won Race 5 at Brands Hatch while scoring the fastest lap of the race.

=== Formula Renault Eurocup ===
In late 2020, Pulling made a one-off appearance in Formula Renault Eurocup at Imola, driving for Fernando Alonso's team. She finished both races in last place.

=== W Series ===
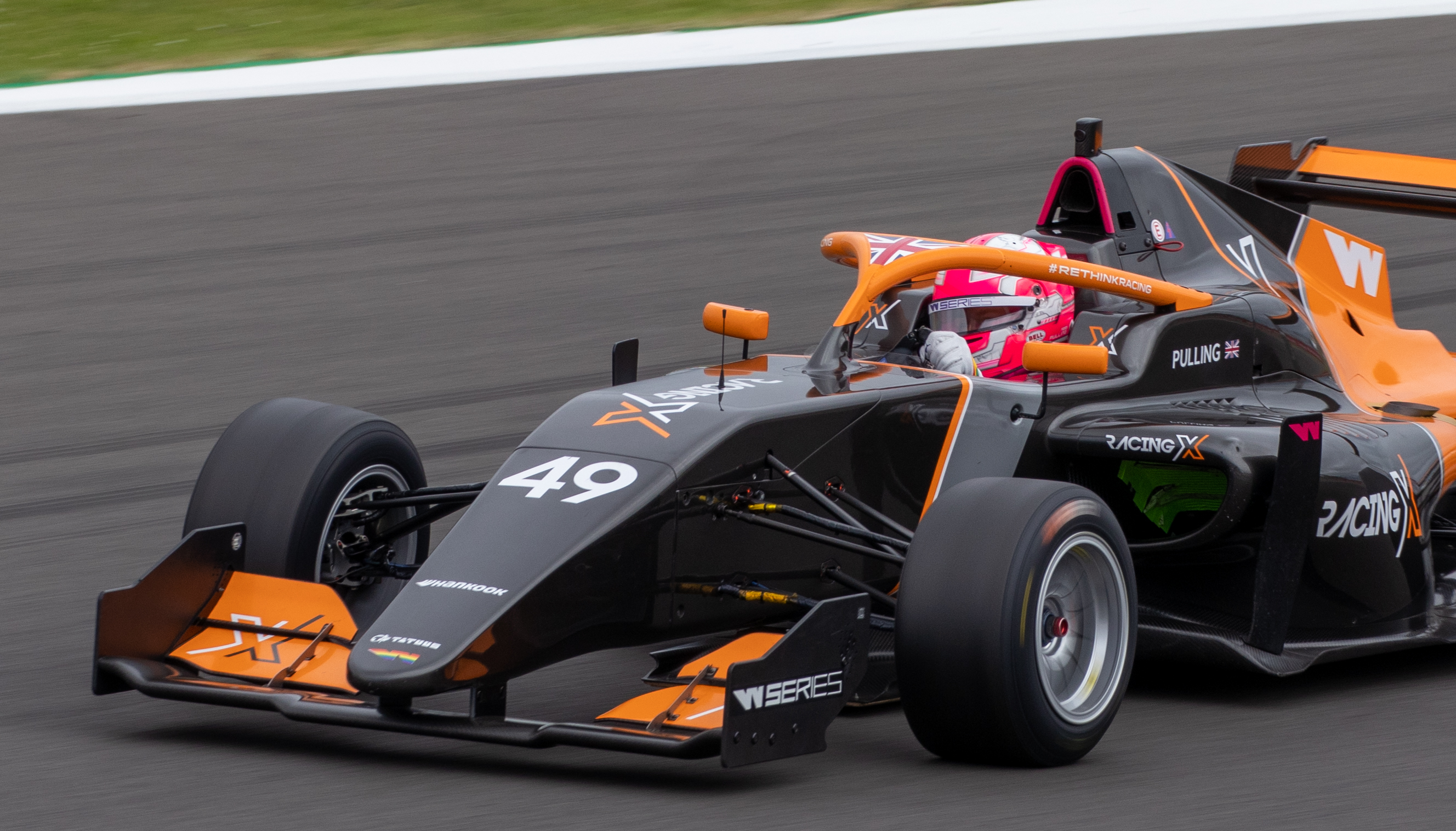
Pulling competing in the 2022 W Series Silverstone round

After taking part in pre-season testing at Anglesey Circuit in Wales, Pulling was announced on 11 June 2021 as one of five reserve drivers for the second season of the all-female Formula Three championship, W Series. She made her debut at the third round of the championship at Silverstone, where she coincided with her coach Alice Powell. She qualified on pole for race one of the season-ending Austin double-header and achieved her first podium with second place the following day—thus securing seventh in the standings and automatic qualification for the 2022 season.

=== F1 Academy ===
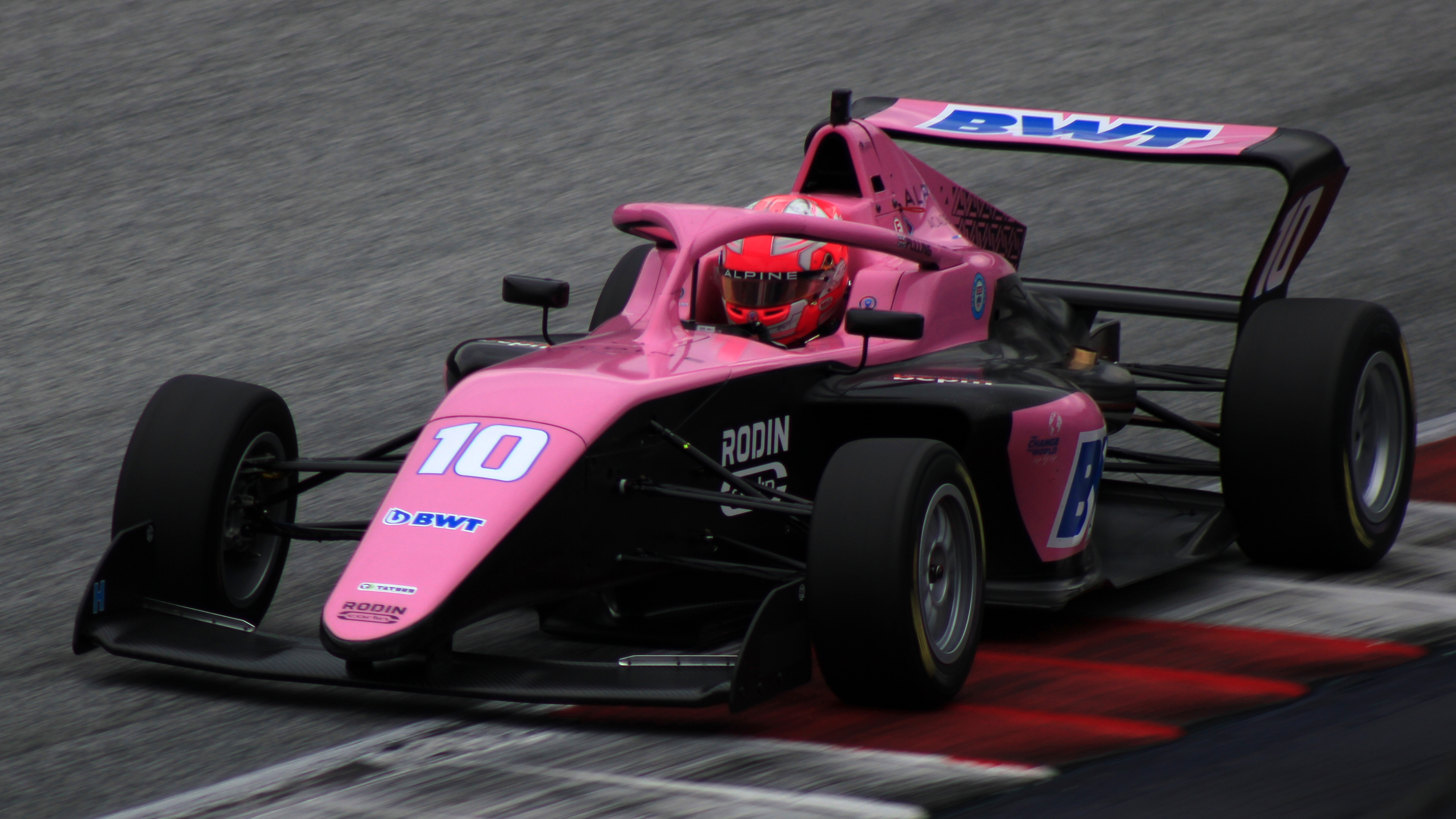
Pulling competing at the Red Bull Ring for the 2023 F1 Academy season

In March 2022, Pulling was signed by Alpine as a member of their new Alpine Affiliate programme. Prior to the 2022 Saudi Arabian Grand Prix, Pulling and Aseel Al-Hamad became the first women to drive a Formula 1 car in Saudi Arabia. In 2023, Pulling was upgraded to a full-time member of the Alpine Academy and competed in the all-female F1 Academy series for the 2023 season with Rodin Carlin, where she finished fifth in the standings.

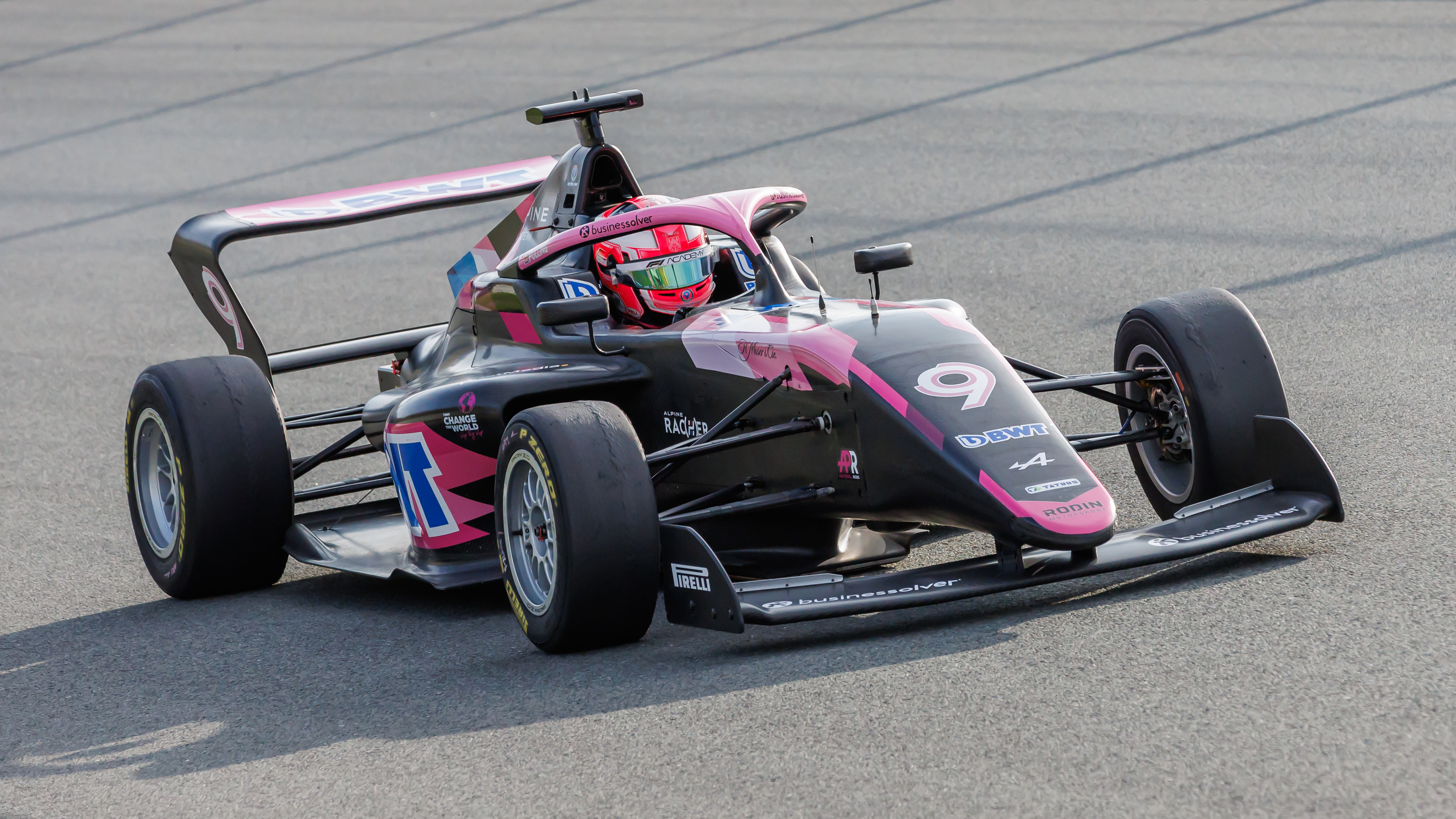
Pulling competing in an F1 Academy race at Zandvoort in 2024

Pulling returned for the 2024 season with Rodin Carlin, now rebranded as Rodin Motorsport, and representing Alpine. In Round 1 at Jeddah, Pulling won her first podiums of the season when she finished in second for Races 1 and 2. She later inherited the win for Race 2 after race winner Doriane Pin was given a post-race time penalty for crossing the finishing line twice at racing speed. This is Pulling's debut win of the series. In Round 2 at Miami, Pulling qualified in pole position in both races and led every single lap to claim victory in both races, only missing out on the fastest lap in Race 1 for a double grand chelem. In Round 3 at Barcelona, Pulling achieved her second grand chelem in Race 1 while earning her fourth consecutive race win in F1 Academy. Despite also qualifying in pole position for Race 2, her race win streak was broken after she was overtaken at the start by Chloe Chambers to finish the race in second. In Round 4 at Zandvoort, Pulling claimed her third grand chelem in Race 1 and continued her podium finish run by finishing in third in Race 2.

After a four-week break, Pulling extended her lead in the championship at Singapore after winning Races 1 and 2 while claiming her fourth grand chelem in Race 2. In Round 5 at Qatar, she finished Race 1 in second and initially won the championship after Race 2 was cancelled. However, a third race at the season finale in Abu Dhabi was added, allowing second-placed Pin to re-enter championship contention; the amount of points available expanded to 84 with an 83-point gap between the two. In qualifying, Pulling took all three poles for the season finale and scored six points to secure the drivers' championship. She ended the season with a win for Races 1 and 2 and finished Race 3 in second, becoming the first F1 Academy driver to achieve a perfect podium record while also securing a record of nine wins in a season. Pulling subsequently announced her departure from the Alpine Affiliate programme.

Pulling returned in subsequent seasons in a supporting role to Rodin Motorsport's drivers, as well as a mentor during 2025 rookie test. Pulling is also a part-time co-commentator for F1 Academy alongside regular commentators Chris McCarthy and Alice Powell.

=== GB3 Championship ===
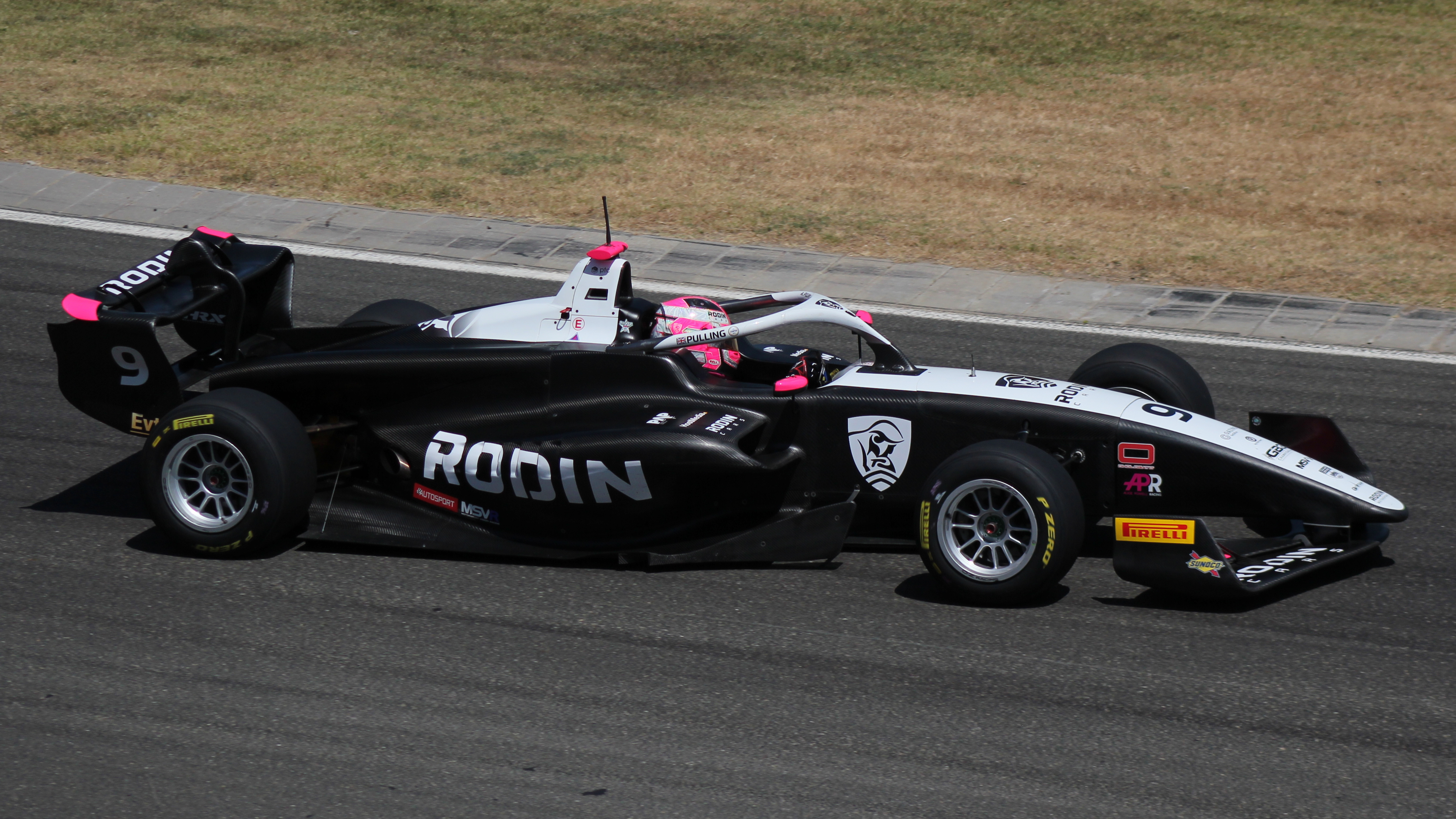
Pulling driving at the Hungaroring during the 2025 GB3 Championship

For winning the 2024 season of F1 Academy, Pulling received a fully-funded seat in the GB3 Championship with Rodin Motorsport for the 2025 season. In her debut race at Silverstone, Pulling qualified in fourth and finished in fifth. She then suffered a crash in Race 3 at Silverstone and raced with a damaged chassis in the following two rounds. In Race 18 at Brands Hatch, a reverse-grid race, Pulling took her only podium with third place. She finished tenth in the drivers' standings, as teammate Alex Ninovic was crowned champion.

Pulling returned for the 2026 season with Rodin Motorsport. Pulling claimed her first pole position in Race 4 at Spa and successfully converted it to her maiden race win, becoming the first female winner in GB3 since Jamie Chadwick in 2018, when the series was known as the BRDC British Formula 3 Championship. Pulling achieved more podiums by finishing third in Races 16 and 18 at Donington Park, and in Race 23 at Barcelona. Pulling finished the season eighth in the drivers' standings, behind both her teammates.

=== Indy NXT ===
On 21 September 2026, Pulling tested an Indy NXT car for Andretti Global at Indianapolis.

== Formula E ==
In October 2024, Nissan Formula E Team announced that Pulling would take part in the women's test held by Formula E at Jarama ahead of the 2024–25 season. She topped the session, lapping three tenths faster than Jamie Chadwick. In June 2025, Nissan announced that Pulling had been signed to a multi-year deal as the team's rookie and simulator driver. She made her first on-track appearance in her new role at the Berlin rookie test. Despite feeling unwell, she completed the morning and afternoon sessions in 17th place. Pulling participated in the women's test in Valencia ahead of the 2025–26 season, finishing both the morning and afternoon sessions in second. She made another rookie session appearance during the 2026 Miami ePrix, and returned for the Madrid rookie test, where she finished eighth in the morning session and nineth in the afternoon session. Pulling was retained for the 2026–27 season.

== Personal life ==
Pulling's father, Andy, was a motorbike endurance racer. Pulling is currently managed by former W Series driver Alice Powell. Pulling is a Rodin Cars ambassador.

== Karting record ==
=== Karting career summary ===
Season	Series	Team	Position
2013	LGM Series - IAME Cadet		26th
2013	Trent Valley Kart Club - IAME Cadet		5th
2014	LGM Series - IAME Cadet		26th
2014	Kartmasters British GP - IAME Cadet		13th
2014	Super One Series - IAME Cadet	Kato Motorsport	21st
2015	Super One Series - IAME Cadet	KMS	36th
2015	Super One Series - TKM Junior		14th
2015	LGM Series - IAME Cadet		51st
2016	Super One Series - TKM Junior		2nd
2017	Super One Series - TKM Junior		1st
2017	ABkC 'O' Plate - Junior TKM		1st
2018	Super One Series - TKM Junior	Tal-Ko Racing	1st
2019	British Kart Championship - TKM Extreme	Tal-Ko Racing	44th

== Racing record ==
=== Career summary ===
Season	Series	Team	Races	Wins	Poles	F/Laps	Podiums	Points	Position
2018	Ginetta Junior Championship	Total Control Racing	7	0	0	0	0	62	21st
2019	Ginetta GT5 Challenge	Race Car Consultants	18	0	0	0	0	17	13th
2020	F4 British Championship	JHR Developments	26	0	0	0	4	191.5	6th
2020	Formula Renault Eurocup	FA Racing	2	0	0	0	0	0	NC†
2021	F4 British Championship	JHR Developments	18	0	0	0	3	97	14th
2021	W Series	Puma W Series Team	4	0	1	0	1	40	7th
2022	W Series	Racing X	7	0	0	2	2	73	4th
2023	F1 Academy	Rodin Carlin	21	0	2	4	7	175	5th
2024	F1 Academy	Rodin Motorsport	14	9	10	6	14	338	**1st**
2024	F4 British Championship	Rodin Motorsport	23	1	0	1	3	130	7th
2024–25	Formula E	Nissan Formula E Team	Rookie and simulator driver						
2025	GB3 Championship	Rodin Motorsport	24	0	0	0	1	231	10th
2025–26	Formula E	Nissan Formula E Team	Rookie and simulator driver						
2026	GB3 Championship	Rodin Motorsport	23	1	1	0	4	261	8th
2026–27	Formula E	Nissan Formula E Team	Rookie and simulator driver						

^{†} As Pulling was a guest driver, she was ineligible for championship points.
* Season still in progress.

=== Complete Ginetta Junior Championship results ===
(key) (Races in bold indicate pole position) (Races in italics indicate fastest lap)

Year	Team	1	2	3	4	5	6	7	8	9	10	11	12	13	14	15	16	17	18	19	20	21	22	23	24	25	26	DC	Points
2018	Total Control Racing	BHI; 1; 9	BHI; 2; 13	DON; 1; 12	DON; 2; 12	DON; 3; 10	THR; 1; 13	THR; 2; 16	OUL; 1	OUL; 2	CRO; 1	CRO; 2	CRO; 3	SNE; 1	SNE; 2	SNE; 3	ROC; 1	ROC; 2	ROC; 3	KNO; 1	KNO; 2	SIL; 1	SIL; 2	SIL; 3	BHGP; 1	BHGP; 2	BHGP; 3	21st	62

=== Complete F4 British Championship results ===
(key) (Races in bold indicate pole position) (Races in italics indicate fastest lap)

Year	Team	1	2	3	4	5	6	7	8	9	10	11	12	13	14	15	16	17	18	19	20	21	22	23	24	25	26	27	28	29	30	DC	Points
2020	JHR Developments	DON; 1; 15	DON; 2; 6	DON; 3 Ret	BHGP; 1; 4	BHGP; 2; 3	BHGP; 3; 14	OUL; 1; 9	OUL; 2; 5	OUL; 3; 6	KNO; 1; 6	KNO; 2 Ret	KNO; 3 Ret	THR; 1; 6	THR; 2; 5	THR; 3; 2	SIL; 1 Ret	SIL; 2; 8	SIL; 3; 7	CRO; 1; 3	CRO; 2; 4	SNE; 1; 4	SNE; 2; 5	SNE; 3; 6	BHI; 1; 4	BHI; 2; 7	BHI; 3; 3					6th	191.5
2021	JHR Developments	THR1; 1; 12	THR1; 2; 5	THR1; 3; 12	SNE; 1; 6	SNE; 2; 9	SNE; 3; 5	BHI; 1; 3^{5}	BHI; 2; 3	BHI; 3; 8	OUL; 1 Ret	OUL; 2; 4^{2}	OUL; 3; 16	KNO; 1; 13	KNO; 2; 8^{3}	KNO; 3; 4	THR2; 1; 3	THR2; 2; 11	THR2; 3; 10	CRO; 1	CRO; 2	CRO; 3	SIL; 1	SIL; 2	SIL; 3	DON; 1	DON; 2	DON; 3	BHGP; 1	BHGP; 2	BHGP; 3	14th	97
2024	Rodin Motorsport	DPN; 1; 7	DPN; 2; 17	DPN; 3 C	BHI; 1; 7	BHI; 2; 1	BHI; 3; 6	SNE; 1; 9	SNE; 2; 5^{9}	SNE; 3; 7	THR; 1; 2	THR; 2; 12	THR; 3; 4	SILGP; 1; 11	SILGP; 2; 10^{6}	SILGP; 3; 11	ZAN; 1; 9	ZAN; 2; 2	ZAN; 3; 20	KNO; 1; 6	KNO; 2; 7	KNO; 3; 7	DPGP; 1	DPGP; 2	DPGP; 3	SILN; 1	SILN; 2	SILN; 3	BHGP; 1; 18	BHGP; 2; 4	BHGP; 3; 8	7th	130

=== Complete Formula Renault Eurocup results ===
(key) (Races in bold indicate pole position) (Races in italics indicate fastest lap)

Year	Team	1	2	3	4	5	6	7	8	9	10	11	12	13	14	15	16	17	18	19	20	DC	Points
2020	FA Racing	MNZ; 1	MNZ; 2	IMO; 1	IMO; 2	NÜR; 1	NÜR; 2	MAG; 1	MAG; 2	ZAN; 1	ZAN; 2	CAT; 1	CAT; 2	SPA; 1	SPA; 2	IMO; 1; 15	IMO; 2; 16	HOC; 1	HOC; 2	LEC; 1	LEC; 2	NC†	0

^{†} As Pulling was a guest driver, she was ineligible for championship points.

=== Complete W Series results ===
(key) (Races in bold indicate pole position) (Races in italics indicate fastest lap)

Year	Team	1	2	3	4	5	6	7	8	DC	Points
2021	Puma W Series Team	RBR1	RBR2	SIL; 8	HUN	SPA	ZAN; 7	**COA1**; 4	COA2; 2	7th	40
2022	Racing X	MIA1; 4	MIA2; 6	CAT; 2	SIL; 3	LEC; 9	HUN; 5	SIN; 6		4th	73

=== Complete F1 Academy results ===
(key) (Races in bold indicate pole position; races in italics indicate fastest lap)

Year	Team	1	2	3	4	5	6	7	8	9	10	11	12	13	14	15	16	17	18	19	20	21	DC	Points
2023	Rodin Carlin	RBR; 1; 4	RBR; 2; 8	RBR; 3; 4	CRT; 1; 11	CRT; 2; 12	CRT; 3; 3	CAT; 1; 2	CAT; 2; 3	CAT; 3; 4	ZAN; 1; 7	ZAN; 2; 10	ZAN; 3 Ret	MNZ; 1; 4	MNZ; 2; 3	**MNZ**; **3**; 2	**LEC**; **1**; 2	LEC; 2; 7	LEC; 3 DSQ	COA; 1; 2	COA; 2; 4	COA; 3; 6	5th	175
2024	Rodin Motorsport	JED; 1; 2	JED; 2; 1	**MIA**; **1**; 1	**MIA**; **2**; 1	**CAT**; **1**; 1	**CAT**; **2**; 2	**ZAN**; **1**; 1	ZAN; 2; 3	**SIN**; **1**; 1	**SIN**; **2**; 1	LSL; 1; 2	LSL; 2 C	**YMC**; **1**; 1	**YMC**; **2**; 1	**YMC**; **3**; 2							1st	338

=== Complete GB3 Championship results ===
(key) (Races in bold indicate pole position) (Races in italics indicate fastest lap)

Year	Team	1	2	3	4	5	6	7	8	9	10	11	12	13	14	15	16	17	18	19	20	21	22	23	24	DC	Points
2025	Rodin Motorsport	SIL1; 1; 5	SIL1; 2; 6	SIL1; 3 Ret	ZAN; 1; 13	ZAN; 2; 13	ZAN; 3; 11^{2}	SPA; 1; 16	SPA; 2; 17	SPA; 3; 17	HUN; 1; 10	HUN; 2; 9	HUN; 3; 9	SIL2; 1; 12	SIL2; 2 Ret	SIL2; 3; 7^{6}	BRH; 1; 8	BRH; 2; 9	BRH; 3; 3^{1}	DON; 1; 7	DON; 2; 12	DON; 3 Ret	MNZ; 1; 9	MNZ; 2; 5	MNZ; 3; 4	10th	231
2026	Rodin Motorsport	SIL1; 1 Ret	SIL1; 2; 20	SIL1; 3; 8	**SPA**; **1**; 1	SPA; 2; 5	SPA; 3 C	HUN; 1 Ret	HUN; 2; 4	HUN; 3 Ret	RBR; 1; 8	RBR; 2; 6	RBR; 3 Ret	SIL2; 1; 6	SIL2; 2; 10	SIL2; 3; 21†	DON; 1; 3	DON; 2; 9	DON; 3; 3^{3}	BRH; 1; 10	BRH; 2 Ret	BRH; 3; 9	CAT; 1; 8	CAT; 2; 3	CAT; 3; 8^{2}	8th	261

† Did not finish, but classified.

Sporting positions
Preceded by Marta García	F1 Academy champion 2024	Succeeded by Doriane Pin
