= 2026 GB3 Championship =

Motor racing championship

The 2026 GB3 Championship was a motor racing championship for open wheel, formula racing cars held across Europe. The 2026 season was the eleventh organised by the British Racing Drivers' Club in the United Kingdom, and the sixth season under the GB3 moniker after rebranding from the BRDC British Formula 3 Championship in mid-2021. The championship featured a mix of professional motor racing teams and privately funded drivers. The season was run over eight triple-header rounds. It started in April and ended in November.

VRD Racing driver Nikita Bedrin won the Drivers' Championship title with two races to spare, and in doing so also helped his team win their maiden Teams' Championship title.

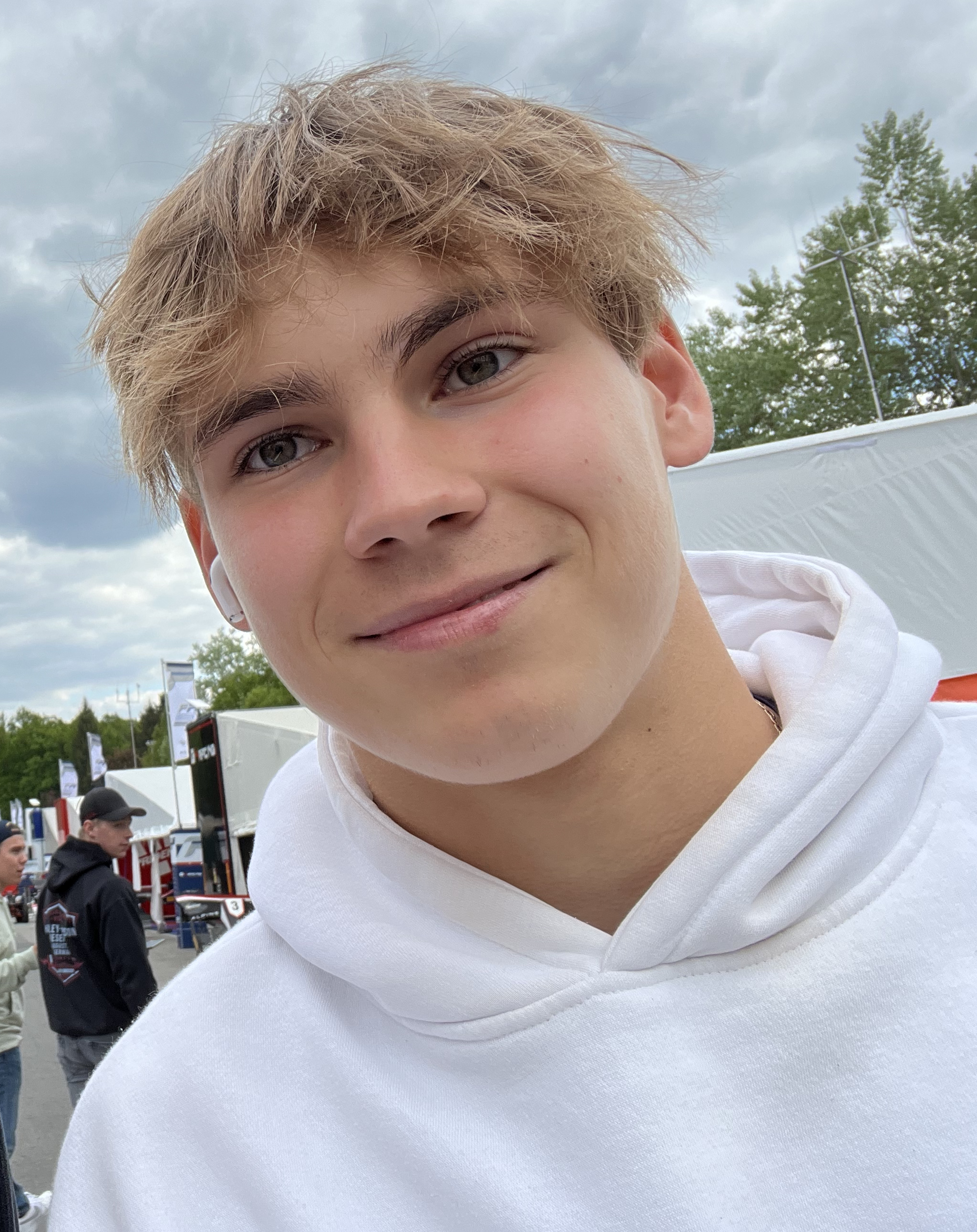
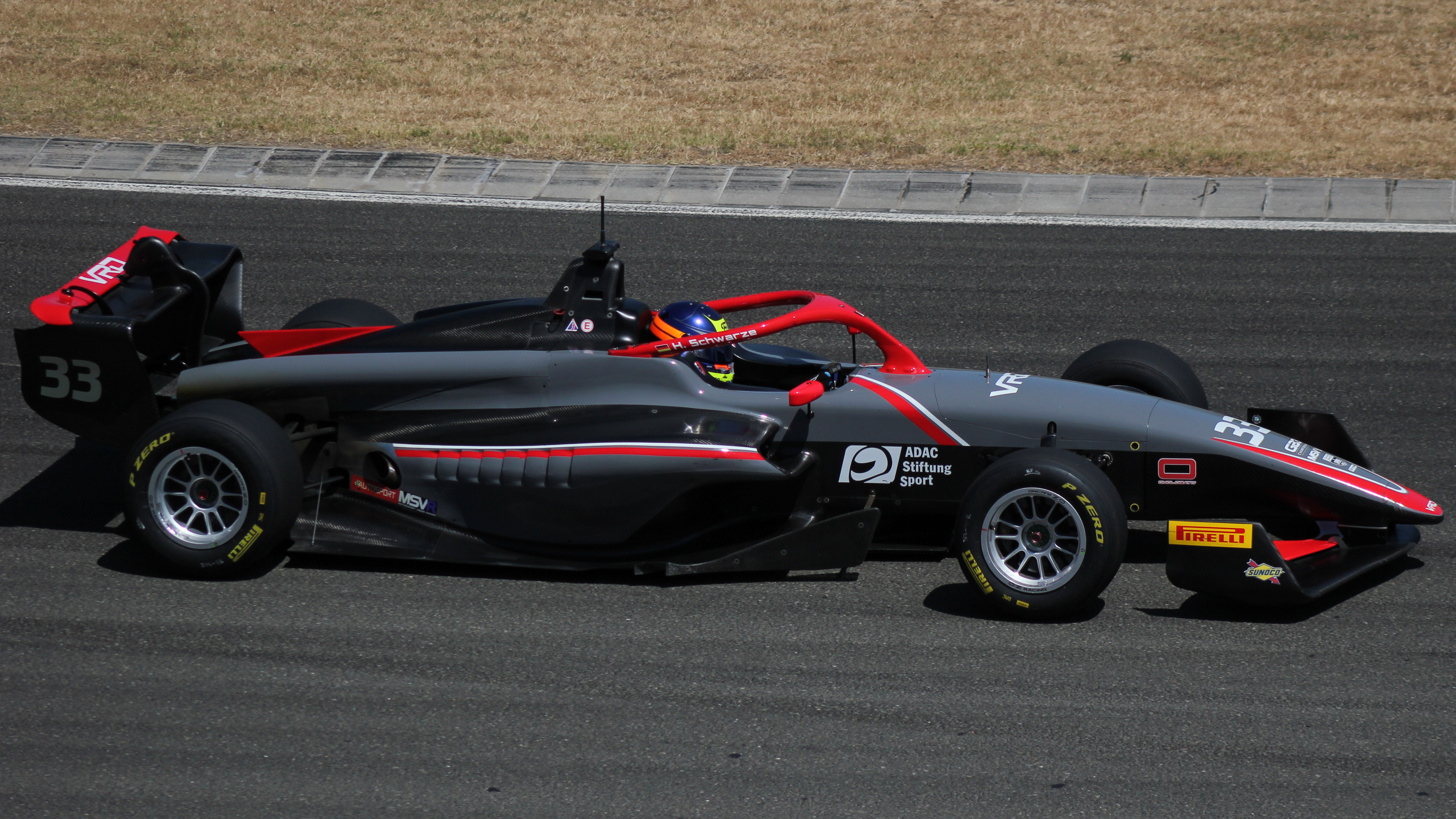
Nikita Bedrin won the Drivers' Championship title, while his VRD Racing team won the Teams' Championship.

== Teams and drivers ==
After the introduction of the Tatuus MSV GB3-025 in 2025, 2026 saw another aerodynamic upgrade to the chassis package. The Mountune engine, previously a two-litre unit, was upgraded to a 2.4-litre engine, thereby providing a 25% torque increase. All cars ran on Pirelli tyres.

Team	No.	Driver	Status	Rounds
(New Zealand) Rodin Motorsport	1	(Germany) Maxim Rehm		All
(New Zealand) Rodin Motorsport	2	(Hungary) Martin Molnár		All
(New Zealand) Rodin Motorsport	3	(United Kingdom) Abbi Pulling		All
(United Kingdom) Hitech	4	(Japan) Jin Nakamura		1–2
(United Kingdom) Hitech	4	(Malta) Jacob Micallef		3–6
(United Kingdom) Hitech	4	(Japan) Kanato Le		7
(United Kingdom) Hitech	4	(United Arab Emirates) Theo Palmer	G	8
(United Kingdom) Hitech	5	(China) Yuhao Fu		All
(United Kingdom) Hitech	6	(United Kingdom) Deagen Fairclough		All
(United Arab Emirates) Xcel Motorsport	7	(Spain) Lucas Fluxá		All
(United Arab Emirates) Xcel Motorsport	8	(United Kingdom) Rowan Campbell-Pilling		All
(United Arab Emirates) Xcel Motorsport	9	(Brazil) Ricardo Baptista		All
(United Kingdom) Hillspeed	10	(Australia) Dante Vinci		All
(United Kingdom) Hillspeed	11	(Australia) Peter Bouzinelos		All
(United Kingdom) Hillspeed	12	(Brazil) Aurelia Nobels		All
(United Kingdom) JHR Developments	14	(United Kingdom) Thomas Ingram Hill	G	8
(United Kingdom) JHR Developments	15	(United Kingdom) Lewis Wherrell	G	8
(United Kingdom) Elite Motorsport	17	(Kazakhstan) Kirill Kutskov (Note: Kutskov is Russian, but competed under a Kazakh licence as Russian national emblems were banned by the FIA following the Russian invasion of Ukraine.)		1–2
(United Kingdom) Elite Motorsport	17	(Spain) Edu Robinson		5, 7
(United Kingdom) Elite Motorsport	17	(United Kingdom) Fred Green	G	8
(United Kingdom) Elite Motorsport	18	(Philippines) Flynn Jackes (Note: Jackes is a Filipino-Australian racing driver who competed under a Filipino licence in rounds 1–4 and an Australian licence in round 5.)		All
(United Kingdom) Elite Motorsport	19	(South Korea) Kyuho Lee		All
(United States) VRD Racing	20	(Italy) Nikita Bedrin		All
(United States) VRD Racing	21	(Mexico) Patricio González		All
(United States) VRD Racing	22	(Mexico) Rodrigo González		All
(United Kingdom) Fortec Motorsports	23	(Japan) Alexandros Kattoulas		1–2
(United Kingdom) Fortec Motorsports	24	(Australia) Jack Taylor		1–2, 5–6
(United Kingdom) Arden Motorsport	26	(United Kingdom) Lewis Gilbert		1–4
(United Kingdom) Arden Motorsport	26	(Israel) Matan Achituv	G	8
(United Kingdom) Arden Motorsport	27	(United Kingdom) Leon Wilson		All
(United Kingdom) Nitrous Competitions ADM Racing	31	(United States) Jason Pribyl		1–2, 5, 8
(United Arab Emirates) AKCEL GP	32	(India) Aditya Kulkarni		7
(United States) TJ Speed Motorsports	35	(India) Ary Bansal	G	8
(United States) TJ Speed Motorsports	36	(Germany) Arjen Kräling	G	8

Icon	Class
G	Guest driver

=== Team changes ===
Arden Motorsport returned to GB3 after a one-year absence, while Nitrous Competitions ADM Racing, a cooperation between British Superbike Championship team Nitrous Competitions and GB4 team ADM Racing, entered a single-car at four of the season's events.

Chris Dittmann Racing, who had entered every season since 2013, and Argenti with Prema, who had joined the series in 2025, both left the championship before the beginning of the season.

==== Mid-season ====
American-Australian team TJ Speed Motorsports made their debut in European junior racing in the final round of the season, fielding two cars to prepare for a potential full-time entry in 2027.

=== Driver changes ===
Rodin Motorsport signed two new drivers after they promoted reigning champion Alex Ninovic to their newly formed Formula Regional European Championship outfit and Gianmarco Pradel joined MP Motorsport in Eurocup-3. Maxim Rehm joined the team for his full-season debut after a race-winning guest drive for Hillspeed in the final round of 2025, together with Martin Molnár, who stepped up from British F4 after coming third in 2025 with Virtuosi Racing.

Nikita Johnson and Keanu Al Azhari left Hitech as Johnson competed in Indy NXT with Cape Motorsports Powered by ECR and Al Azhari joined Hitech's Eurocup-3 outfit. The team signed British F4 graduate Yuhao Fu, who came 25th in 2025 driving for Xcel Motorsport. Noah Lisle was originally signed to be the third driver for Hitech after coming 7th in 2025, but later withdrew for personal reasons. His replacement was announced to be Jin Nakamura, who embarked on a part-time campaign alongside his main FIA Formula 3 campaign with the team. Nakamura would ultimately compete for the team in the opening two rounds.

Xcel Motorsport entered 2026 with an all-new driver lineup after 2025 runner-up Patrick Heuzenroeder departed the series to join Campos Racing in Eurocup-3 and neither Jack Sherwood nor any of the team's three part-time drivers returned. Xcel signed Rowan Campbell-Pilling, who stepped up from British F4 after coming tenth in 2025 driving for JHR Developments, hired Ricardo Baptista, who graduated to GB3 from Brazilian Formula 4, where he finished the 2025 season in tenth, and saw Lucas Fluxá move over from Hillspeed after finishing the 2025 GB3 season in eighth.

Hillspeed also had an all-new, all-rookie lineup after none of their eight part-time competitors returned to the team. All three of its drivers stepped up from Formula 4, with Aurelia Nobels departing F1 Academy after coming 13th in 2025 with ART Grand Prix, Dante Vinci graduating from Italian F4 after finishing the 2025 season in 21st driving for Van Amersfoort Racing, and Peter Bouzinelos returning to racing after a year on the sidelines following a bicycling accident.

Noah Lisle and Kai Daryanani both left JHR Developments, with Lisle initially joining Hitech before leaving due to personal reasons and Daryanani moving to FREC with Trident. None of the teams' other part-time drivers returned to GB3.

Reza Seewooruthun departed Argenti with Prema, as he competed in FREC with Rodin Motorsport. None of the teams' other part-time drivers returned to GB3.

Bianca Bustamante left Elite Motorsport to join Palou Motorsport in Eurocup-3, while Will Macintyre stepped away from racing to focus on his cancer recovery. The team signed Genesis Magma Racing's Trajectory Program driver Kyuho Lee, who finished 22nd with Rodin Motorsport in Spanish F4 in 2025. Kirill Kutskov completed the team's lineup for the first two rounds of the season on his step up from Formula 4.

VRD Racing had an all-new line up, with Hugo Schwarze leaving midway through 2025 to compete in the European Le Mans Series in the LMP3 class with R-ace GP and Enzo Tarnvanichkul focusing on his Eurocup-3 campaign with Campos Racing. After joining the team for the second half of 2025, siblings Patricio and Rodrigo González rejoined the team for the full 2026 season, and former FIA F3 driver Nikita Bedrin joined the team for his GB3 debut after finishing the 2025 FRECA season in eleventh with Saintéloc Racing.

Fortec Motorsport saw Stefan Bostandjiev join Hitech in Eurocup-3. To replace him, the team signed Alexandros Kattoulas, who graduated from GB4 after finishing the 2025 season fourth driving for Elite Motorsport. The team also promoted Jack Taylor from their GB4 outfit, with whom he came tenth in 2025.

Returning team Arden Motorsport fielded karting champion Lewis Gilbert on his jump up to GB3 and promoted Leon Wilson from their GB4 outfit, with whom he came seventh in 2025.

New team Nitrous Competitions ADM Racing promoted Jason Pribyl from their GB4 outfit, with whom he came 17th in 2025. Pribyl joined the team for the rounds at Silverstone, Spa and Barcelona.

=== Mid-season ===
Hitech announced ahead of round three that Spanish F4 driver Jacob Micallef would make his GB3 Championship debut by joining the team on selected rounds in place of Nakamura.

Fortec Motorsports and their drivers Alexandros Kattoulas and Jack Taylor did not enter the rounds at the Hungaroring nor the Red Bull Ring.

Before the Silverstone 2nd round, Lewis Gilbert left the series to join WSR in the British Touring Car Championship which left his seat at Arden vacant. Elite Motorsport meanwhile fielded Edu Robinson on his GB3 debut in the car previously driven by Kirill Kutskov. Fortec Motorsport rejoined the grid, albeit with Kattoulas still absent.

Kanato Le replaced Jacob Micallef in the No. 4 Hitech at Brands Hatch, returning to GB3 after driving for Hillspeed in three rounds in 2025. Jack Taylor and Fortec Motorsport missed the round, while Edu Robinson returned for another outing at Elite Motorsport. Brands Hatch also saw the debut of former FREC outfit AKCEL GP, who fielded a single car for series returnee Aditya Kulkarni on a one-off entry.

Multiple drivers made their debut in the final event of the year. GB4 runner-up Fred Green joined Elite Motorsport in the car previously driven by Kutskov and Robinson, while Matan Achituv took over Gilbert's Arden Motorsport machine and British F4 runner-up Theo Palmer filled Hitech's No. 4 car previously piloted by Nakamura, Micallef and Le. Two teams also joined the grid for the final round in returnee JHR Developments and debutant TJ Speed Motorsports, fielding two cars each. JHR entered British F4 race winner Lewis Wherrell and GB4 race winner Thomas Ingram Hill, while TJ Speed enlisted reigning GB4 champion Ary Bansal and Arjen Kräling.

== Calendar ==
The calendar was announced on 25 September 2025. The series kept to its strategy of combining four British rounds with four rounds outside the UK, but swapped two overseas venues. The series did not return to Circuit Zandvoort, where it had been racing since 2023, and Monza Circuit also did not return after its debut in 2025. Instead, GB3 debuted at the Red Bull Ring and at Circuit de Barcelona-Catalunya.

Round		Circuit	Date	Supporting	Map of circuit locations
1	R1	(United Kingdom) Silverstone Circuit (Grand Prix Circuit, Northamptonshire)	25 April	British GT Championship; GB4 Championship	2026 GB3 Championship is located in Europe
1	R2	(United Kingdom) Silverstone Circuit (Grand Prix Circuit, Northamptonshire)	26 April	British GT Championship; GB4 Championship	2026 GB3 Championship is located in Europe
1	R3	(United Kingdom) Silverstone Circuit (Grand Prix Circuit, Northamptonshire)	26 April	British GT Championship; GB4 Championship	2026 GB3 Championship is located in Europe
2	R4	Circuit de Spa-Francorchamps (Spa, Belgium)	30 May	Spa Euro Race; Formula Regional European Championship; Supercar Challenge; Britcar Endurance Championship	2026 GB3 Championship is located in Europe
2	R5	Circuit de Spa-Francorchamps (Spa, Belgium)	30 May	Spa Euro Race; Formula Regional European Championship; Supercar Challenge; Britcar Endurance Championship	2026 GB3 Championship is located in Europe
2	R6	Circuit de Spa-Francorchamps (Spa, Belgium)	31 May	Spa Euro Race; Formula Regional European Championship; Supercar Challenge; Britcar Endurance Championship	2026 GB3 Championship is located in Europe
3	R7	Hungaroring (Mogyoród, Hungary)	4 July	International GT Open; Euroformula Open Championship; Formula Regional European Championship; TCR Europe Touring Car Series	2026 GB3 Championship is located in Europe
3	R8	Hungaroring (Mogyoród, Hungary)	5 July	International GT Open; Euroformula Open Championship; Formula Regional European Championship; TCR Europe Touring Car Series	2026 GB3 Championship is located in Europe
3	R9	Hungaroring (Mogyoród, Hungary)	5 July	International GT Open; Euroformula Open Championship; Formula Regional European Championship; TCR Europe Touring Car Series	2026 GB3 Championship is located in Europe
4	R10	Red Bull Ring (Spielberg, Austria)	11 July	ADAC Racing Weekend Spielberg; Porsche Sports Cup Deutschland; Spezial Tourenwagen Trophy; ADAC Tourenwagen Junior Cup	2026 GB3 Championship is located in Europe
4	R11	Red Bull Ring (Spielberg, Austria)	12 July	ADAC Racing Weekend Spielberg; Porsche Sports Cup Deutschland; Spezial Tourenwagen Trophy; ADAC Tourenwagen Junior Cup	2026 GB3 Championship is located in Europe
4	R12	Red Bull Ring (Spielberg, Austria)	12 July	ADAC Racing Weekend Spielberg; Porsche Sports Cup Deutschland; Spezial Tourenwagen Trophy; ADAC Tourenwagen Junior Cup	2026 GB3 Championship is located in Europe
5	R13	(United Kingdom) Silverstone Circuit (Grand Prix Circuit, Northamptonshire)	1 August	GT Cup Championship; GB4 Championship; Radical Cup UK	2026 GB3 Championship is located in Europe
5	R14	(United Kingdom) Silverstone Circuit (Grand Prix Circuit, Northamptonshire)	2 August	GT Cup Championship; GB4 Championship; Radical Cup UK	2026 GB3 Championship is located in Europe
5	R15	(United Kingdom) Silverstone Circuit (Grand Prix Circuit, Northamptonshire)	2 August	GT Cup Championship; GB4 Championship; Radical Cup UK	2026 GB3 Championship is located in Europe
6	R16	(United Kingdom) Donington Park (Grand Prix Circuit, Leicestershire)	5 September	British GT Championship; GB4 Championship; TCR UK Touring Car Championship	2026 GB3 Championship is located in Europe
6	R17	(United Kingdom) Donington Park (Grand Prix Circuit, Leicestershire)	6 September	British GT Championship; GB4 Championship; TCR UK Touring Car Championship	2026 GB3 Championship is located in Europe
6	R18	(United Kingdom) Donington Park (Grand Prix Circuit, Leicestershire)	6 September	British GT Championship; GB4 Championship; TCR UK Touring Car Championship	2026 GB3 Championship is located in Europe
7	R19	(United Kingdom) Brands Hatch (Grand Prix Circuit, Kent)	26 September	British GT Championship; GB4 Championship	2026 GB3 Championship is located in Europe
7	R20	(United Kingdom) Brands Hatch (Grand Prix Circuit, Kent)	27 September	British GT Championship; GB4 Championship	2026 GB3 Championship is located in Europe
7	R21	(United Kingdom) Brands Hatch (Grand Prix Circuit, Kent)	27 September	British GT Championship; GB4 Championship	2026 GB3 Championship is located in Europe
8	R22	Circuit de Barcelona-Catalunya (Montmeló, Spain)	7 November	Eurocup-3; F4 Spanish Championship; TCR Spain Touring Car Championship	2026 GB3 Championship is located in Europe
8	R23	Circuit de Barcelona-Catalunya (Montmeló, Spain)	8 November	Eurocup-3; F4 Spanish Championship; TCR Spain Touring Car Championship	2026 GB3 Championship is located in Europe
8	R24	Circuit de Barcelona-Catalunya (Montmeló, Spain)	8 November	Eurocup-3; F4 Spanish Championship; TCR Spain Touring Car Championship	2026 GB3 Championship is located in Europe

== Season report ==
=== First half ===
Silverstone hosted the opening round of the 2026 GB3 Championship, which began with a double pole position for VRD Racing's Nikita Bedrin in qualifying. He dropped behind the Rodin pair of Martin Molnár and Maxim Rehm after a slow start to the opening race, but quickly regained second place, closed up to Molnár and retook the lead on lap five. He led throughout a late-race safety car to secure victory. Bedrin's start to the second race was suboptimal again as he dropped behind Hitech's Deagen Fairclough, but he moved back in front a few corners later. Fairclough kept close to Bedrin before retiring with a car issue. That left Bedrin to fend off Rehm before winning again, with Xcel's Lucas Fluxá taking third. Elite's Flynn Jackes had reversed-grid pole position and led throughout the race, before a last-lap battle saw Hitech's Jin Nakamura snatch victory at the final corner. Elite's Kyuho Lee took second in the same battle, before a penalty dropped him off the podium. Fluxá inherited third as Bedrin assumed the top of the points standings.

In qualifying for round two at Spa, Rodin's Abbi Pulling became the first woman to take a pole position in GB3, sharing the honors with Bedrin. The first race of the weekend was postponed by multiple hours due to rain, which saw the reversed-grid race get cancelled. When the race got underway, Pulling held the lead ahead of Bedrin and Rehm before a mid-race safety car brought them back onto her tail. On the restart, Rehm attacked and passed Bedrin for second, allowing Pulling to escape up front. Bedrin reclaimed second one lap later as Rehm dropped down the order and Molnár claimed third. Bedrin set off after Pulling, but she held on, taking the first win for a female driver in GB3 history. The second race saw a clean start for Bedrin up front, who gapped the field as Pulling attacked Rehm for second. The latter fended her off, which saw Pulling drop behind Fairclough and Molnár on the Kemmel straight. Molnár then took third and the positions remained static afterwards, allowing Bedrin to win and extend his lead to 27 points over Rehm.

Home hero Molnár and Bedrin shared pole positions in qualifying at the Hungaroring. A better start from the front row for Fairclough saw him take the lead of the first race, with Molnár dropping to second ahead of Bedrin. He held the points leader off multiple times, but lost out to both Bedrin and Rehm after a safety car restart as Fairclough was free to gap the field and take victory. Fairclough was once again the fastest starter in race two as he took the lead again, but Bedrin reclaimed the position directly after. Fairclough's car then stopped and he retired, handing a bigger lead to Bedrin as Molnár and Rehm disputed second place. Rehm then also retired with an issue, handing P3 to Fluxá. Jackes started the reversed-grid race from pole position and led from lights to flag to secure his maiden GB3 win. Hillspeed's front row starter Dante Vinci initially held second, before Fluxá and Xcel's Rowan Campbell-Pilling passed him and he dropped down. Bedrin came fifth, with his championship lead now at 68 points following Rehm's race 2 non-score.

The first half of the season concluded with GB3's debut at the Red Bull Ring, where pole positions were once again shared between Molnár and Bedrin. The Hungarian lost the lead of the first race to Rehm into turn one, before Bedrin also moved past him. A safety car then followed, and Bedrin attacked Rehm for the lead. The pair battled for the rest of the race, before Bedrin took the lead with two laps to go. Rehm finished second, before penalties promoted Fluxá to second and Molnár to third. Race two was trouble-free for Bedrin as he was able to convert his pole position into victory. Fluxá and Campbell-Pilling passed Molnár on lap one and spent the race fighting over second, with Fluxá coming out ahead and Rehm inheriting third after penalties for Campbell-Pilling. Race three brought pole position for VRD's Rodrigo González, who lost the lead to his brother Patricio before running off track and dropping to 13th. Patricio González led Bedrin and Arden's Leon Wilson to victory as Bedrin grew his championship lead to 106 points over Fluxá.

=== Second half ===
GB3 returned to Silverstone for round five of the season, and both pole positions went to Fairclough. The first race saw him hold Molnár behind before he lost his lead after a restart on lap four. However, Fairclough remained close and was able to retake the lead one lap later. Campbell-Piling then moved into second, before Molnár got back past him, set after Fairclough but was unable to make another attack for the lead. The contenders for the win in race two were the same, with Fairclough leading Campbell-Piling ahead of Molnár this time. An unsuccessful challenge for second saw Molnár then drop behind Fluxá before the gaps at the front stabilized and Fairclough took another win. Reverse grid pole position went to Elite's debutant Edu Robinson, who spent the race fighting with Rodrigo González and Hitech's Jacob Micallef, with the latter taking his maiden victory after overtaking González on the final lap. Championship leader Bedrin did not feature on the podium all weekend, allowing Molnár to slightly reduce his lead to 103 points.

Bedrin returned to the front in qualifying one at Donington Park as Fairclough took another pole position in qualifying two. The latter started the first race in second and moved past polesitter Bedrin on the first lap as Pulling took third off Molnár. Bedrin kept close to the leader and launched multiple attacks in the latter half of the race, but was unable to deny Fairclough the win. The second race saw Bedrin hit the wall on the opening lap after pressure from Wilson and Molnár. Fairclough pulled away from the pair after the ensuing safety car, managing one more interruption on his way to another victory. Reversed-grid pole position went to Lee, but Campbell-Pilling took the lead after starting third. Both cars ran off track when Lee tried retaking the lead, allowing Pulling into the lead. Campbell-Pilling reclaimed first place one lap later, before Hillspeed's Peter Bouzinelos also moved past Pulling. Campbell-Pilling fended off multiple attacks from the Australian to win. Bedrin had another points-free race, his lead over Molnár further reduced to 81 points.

Fairclough notched up two more pole positions in qualifying for the penultimate round at Brands Hatch. Campbell-Piling started both races alongside him, but a slow start to the first race saw him drop behind Rehm, Bedrin and Pulling. Fairclough comfortably pulled away from the field and built a 14-second gap as he claimed victory over Rehm and Bedrin. Another good start for the second race saw Fairclough lead once more, but he had to contend with an early safety car restart this time. A faultless restart from Campbell-Pilling and Bedrin saw Fairclough pull away again, this time winning by seven seconds as the top three remained static. Reversed-grid pole position went to Bouzinelos, but a bad start for him coupled with a brilliant getaway for Fluxá from fourth on the grid meant the Spaniard took the lead and Bouzinelos dropped to fourth behind teammate Yuhao Fu and Vinci. Hitech's returnee Kanato Le later took third as Fluxá kept Fu behind to take victory. Fairclough's double win meant he took second in the standings, 89 points behind Bedrin.

== Race results ==
Round		Circuit	Pole position	Fastest lap	Winning driver	Winning team
1	R1	(United Kingdom) Silverstone Circuit	(Italy) Nikita Bedrin	(Italy) Nikita Bedrin	(Italy) Nikita Bedrin	(United States) VRD Racing
1	R2	(United Kingdom) Silverstone Circuit	(Italy) Nikita Bedrin	(United Kingdom) Deagen Fairclough	(Italy) Nikita Bedrin	(United States) VRD Racing
1	R3	(United Kingdom) Silverstone Circuit		(Japan) Jin Nakamura	(Japan) Jin Nakamura	(United Kingdom) Hitech
2	R4	(Belgium) Circuit de Spa-Francorchamps	(United Kingdom) Abbi Pulling	(Italy) Nikita Bedrin	(United Kingdom) Abbi Pulling	(New Zealand) Rodin Motorsport
2	R5	(Belgium) Circuit de Spa-Francorchamps	(Italy) Nikita Bedrin	(Italy) Nikita Bedrin	(Italy) Nikita Bedrin	(United States) VRD Racing
2	R6	(Belgium) Circuit de Spa-Francorchamps		Race cancelled due to adverse weather conditions		
3	R7	(Hungary) Hungaroring	(Hungary) Martin Molnár	(United Kingdom) Deagen Fairclough	(United Kingdom) Deagen Fairclough	(United Kingdom) Hitech
3	R8	(Hungary) Hungaroring	(Italy) Nikita Bedrin	(Italy) Nikita Bedrin	(Italy) Nikita Bedrin	(United States) VRD Racing
3	R9	(Hungary) Hungaroring		(Philippines) Flynn Jackes	(Philippines) Flynn Jackes	(United Kingdom) Elite Motorsport
4	R10	(Austria) Red Bull Ring	(Hungary) Martin Molnár	(Germany) Maxim Rehm	(Italy) Nikita Bedrin	(United States) VRD Racing
4	R11	(Austria) Red Bull Ring	(Italy) Nikita Bedrin	(Italy) Nikita Bedrin	(Italy) Nikita Bedrin	(United States) VRD Racing
4	R12	(Austria) Red Bull Ring		(Italy) Nikita Bedrin	(Mexico) Patricio González	(United States) VRD Racing
5	R13	(United Kingdom) Silverstone Circuit	(United Kingdom) Deagen Fairclough	(Hungary) Martin Molnár	(United Kingdom) Deagen Fairclough	(United Kingdom) Hitech
5	R14	(United Kingdom) Silverstone Circuit	(United Kingdom) Deagen Fairclough	(United Kingdom) Deagen Fairclough	(United Kingdom) Deagen Fairclough	(United Kingdom) Hitech
5	R15	(United Kingdom) Silverstone Circuit		(Malta) Jacob Micallef	(Malta) Jacob Micallef	(United Kingdom) Hitech
6	R16	(United Kingdom) Donington Park	(Italy) Nikita Bedrin	(Italy) Nikita Bedrin	(United Kingdom) Deagen Fairclough	(United Kingdom) Hitech
6	R17	(United Kingdom) Donington Park	(United Kingdom) Deagen Fairclough	(United Kingdom) Deagen Fairclough	(United Kingdom) Deagen Fairclough	(United Kingdom) Hitech
6	R18	(United Kingdom) Donington Park		(Italy) Nikita Bedrin	(United Kingdom) Rowan Campbell-Pilling	(United Arab Emirates) Xcel Motorsport
7	R19	(United Kingdom) Brands Hatch	(United Kingdom) Deagen Fairclough	(United Kingdom) Deagen Fairclough	(United Kingdom) Deagen Fairclough	(United Kingdom) Hitech
7	R20	(United Kingdom) Brands Hatch	(United Kingdom) Deagen Fairclough	(United Kingdom) Deagen Fairclough	(United Kingdom) Deagen Fairclough	(United Kingdom) Hitech
7	R21	(United Kingdom) Brands Hatch		(United Kingdom) Deagen Fairclough	(Spain) Lucas Fluxá	(United Arab Emirates) Xcel Motorsport
8	R22	(Spain) Circuit de Barcelona-Catalunya	(Italy) Nikita Bedrin	(Italy) Nikita Bedrin	(Italy) Nikita Bedrin	(United States) VRD Racing
8	R23	(Spain) Circuit de Barcelona-Catalunya	(United Kingdom) Lewis Wherrell	(Italy) Nikita Bedrin	(Italy) Nikita Bedrin	(United States) VRD Racing
8	R24	(Spain) Circuit de Barcelona-Catalunya		(Brazil) Aurelia Nobels	(United Kingdom) Rowan Campbell-Pilling	(United Arab Emirates) Xcel Motorsport

== Championship standings ==
=== Scoring system ===
Races 1 and 2

Points were awarded to the top 20 classified finishers in races one and two, as follows:

Position	**1st**	**2nd**	**3rd**	**4th**	**5th**	**6th**	**7th**	**8th**	**9th**	**10th**	**11th**	**12th**	**13th**	**14th**	**15th**	**16th**	**17th**	**18th**	**19th**	**20th**
Points	35	29	24	21	19	17	15	13	12	11	10	9	8	7	6	5	4	3	2	1

Race 3

The third race, which has its grid formed by reversing the top twelve from the qualifying order, awarded points for finishers in the top 15, as shown below. It also awarded extra points for positions gained from the drivers' respective starting positions.

Position	**1st**	**2nd**	**3rd**	**4th**	**5th**	**6th**	**7th**	**8th**	**9th**	**10th**	**11th**	**12th**	**13th**	**14th**	**15th**
Points	20	17	15	13	11	10	9	8	7	6	5	4	3	2	1

=== Drivers' Championship ===
Pos	Driver	SIL1 (United Kingdom)			SPA (Belgium)			HUN (Hungary)			RBR (Austria)			SIL2 (United Kingdom)			DON (United Kingdom)			BRH (United Kingdom)			CAT (Spain)			Pts
Pos	Driver	R1	R2	R3	R4	R5	R6	R7	R8	R9	R10	R11	R12	R13	R14	R15	R16	R17	R18	R19	R20	R21	R22	R23	R24	Pts
1	(Italy) Nikita Bedrin	**1**	**1**	11^{1}	2	**1**	C	2	**1**	5^{7}	1	**1**	2^{10}	8	5	5^{1}	**2**	Ret	16	3	3	11	**1**	1	3^{4}	534
2	(United Kingdom) Deagen Fairclough	4	Ret	Ret	Ret	4	C	1	Ret	Ret	4	17	DNS	**1**	**1**	10^{2}	1	**1**	5^{7}	**1**	**1**	5^{7}	9	10	6^{12}	401
3	(Spain) Lucas Fluxá	12	4	3^{2}	5	8	C	5	3	2^{5}	2	2	7^{2}	17	3	9^{1}	5	4	4^{3}	9	7	1^{3}	3	5	20	398
4	(Hungary) Martin Molnár	2	DNS	12	3	3	C	**4**	2	8^{2}	**3**	4	4^{7}	2	4	12	4	3	9^{1}	7	4	14	12	6	17	377
5	(Germany) Maxim Rehm	3	2	6^{4}	6	2	C	3	Ret	4^{4}	7	3	Ret	5	6	8	Ret	6	6^{2}	2	5	7^{1}	18	Ret	10^{7}	340
6	(United Kingdom) Rowan Campbell-Pilling	5	5	7	Ret	14	C	7	Ret	3^{1}	14	8	Ret	3	2	7^{4}	6	7	1^{2}	5	2	8^{3}	2	15	1	339
7	(Mexico) Patricio González	6	11	5^{2}	Ret	6	C	10	7	14^{2}	5	5	1^{1}	10	7	4^{3}	10	5	11	8	8	6	13	9	12^{4}	287
8	(United Kingdom) Abbi Pulling	Ret	20	8	**1**	5	C	Ret	4	Ret	8	6	Ret	6	10	21†	3	9	3^{3}	10	Ret	9	8	3	8^{2}	261
9	(Philippines) Flynn Jackes	Ret	12	2	8	11	C	14	9	1	13	14	5^{10}	4	9	13	7	Ret	8	12	13	10^{8}	4	20	2^{2}	255
10	(South Korea) Kyuho Lee	7	6	9	Ret	19	C	6	5	Ret	6	9	14	11	13	11^{3}	8	10	7	14	10	13^{3}	6	11	9^{4}	229
11	(United Kingdom) Leon Wilson	10	8	Ret	15	22	C	15	15	13^{6}	9	19	3^{2}	7	8	6	18	2	Ret	18	15	17	Ret	12	11^{4}	179
12	(Australia) Dante Vinci	Ret	19	13^{2}	9	13	C	11	6	7	12	11	6	14	15	17	15	13	12^{3}	11	6	4^{2}	11	Ret	23	178
13	(Mexico) Rodrigo González	11	7	4	13	16	C	Ret	10	11^{4}	Ret	7	13	13	18	2	16	14	15	13	14	15	16	Ret	18^{1}	152
14	(Australia) Peter Bouzinelos	16	Ret	Ret	Ret	17	C	8	Ret	Ret	Ret	16	9^{5}	15	NC	16^{2}	9	8	2^{2}	6	12	12	22†	7	5	147
15	(China) Yuhao Fu	17	14	14^{2}	12	15	C	13	11	9^{9}	15	15	12^{6}	19	20	20	13	11	17	Ret	11	2	20	19	Ret	137
16	(Malta) Jacob Micallef							9	14	6	11	18	10^{9}	9	11	1^{2}	11	12	10^{3}							129
17	(Brazil) Ricardo Baptista	14	10	20	Ret	12	C	12	12	10^{4}	10	10	11^{6}	Ret	19	15^{4}	17	Ret	14^{4}	17	16	18^{1}	21	16	15^{5}	126
18	(Brazil) Aurelia Nobels	15	15	19	14	20	C	Ret	8	15	Ret	12	8^{5}	18	16	19	14	15	13^{4}	16	Ret	Ret	Ret	18	4	105
19	(Japan) Jin Nakamura	8	3	1^{3}	4	7	C																			96
20	(United Kingdom) Lewis Gilbert	18	16	17^{6}	10	10	C	Ret	13	12^{5}	Ret	13	Ret													61
21	(Japan) Kanato Le																			4	9	3^{2}				50
22	(Australia) Jack Taylor	13	17	16^{6}	11	21	C							Ret	14	14^{3}	12	Ret	DNS							49
23	(Spain) Edu Robinson													12	12	3				15	17	16^{1}				44
24	(Kazakhstan) Kirill Kutskov	19	13	15^{2}	7	9	C																			40
25	(United States) Jason Pribyl	20	18	18^{3}	Ret	18	C							16	17	18^{3}							17	21	16^{9}	35
26	(Japan) Alexandros Kattoulas	9	9	10^{3}	WD	WD	C																			33
27	(India) Aditya Kulkarni																			19	18	19^{1}				6
Guest drivers inelegible to score points
—	(United Kingdom) Lewis Wherrell																						5	**2**	14	–
—	(United Kingdom) Fred Green																						10	4	21	–
—	(United Kingdom) Thomas Ingram Hill																						7	8	19	–
—	(India) Ary Bansal																						15	13	7	–
—	(Germany) Arjen Kräling																						DNS	14	13	–
—	(United Arab Emirates) Theo Palmer																						14	Ret	Ret	–
—	(Israel) Matan Achituv																						19	17	22	–
Pos	Driver	R1	R2	R3	R4	R5	R6	R7	R8	R9	R10	R11	R12	R13	R14	R15	R16	R17	R18	R19	R20	R21	R22	R23	R24	Pts
Pos	Driver	SIL1 (United Kingdom)			SPA (Belgium)			HUN (Hungary)			RBR (Austria)			SIL2 (United Kingdom)			DON (United Kingdom)			BRH (United Kingdom)			CAT (Spain)			Pts

Colour	Result
Gold	Winner
Silver	Second place
Bronze	Third place
Green	Points classification
Blue	Non-points classification
Blue	Non-classified finish (NC)
Purple	Retired, not classified (Ret)
Red	Did not qualify (DNQ)
Red	Did not pre-qualify (DNPQ)
Black	Disqualified (DSQ)
White	Did not start (DNS)
White	Withdrew (WD)
White	Race cancelled (C)
Blank	Did not practice (DNP)
Blank	Did not arrive (DNA)
Blank	Excluded (EX)

**Bold** – Pole

Italics – Fastest Lap

^{1} ^{2 ... 12} – points earned for positions
gained during Race 3.

=== Teams' Championship ===
Each team acquired the points earned by their two highest finishing drivers in each race.

Pos	Team	SIL1 (United Kingdom)			SPA (Belgium)			HUN (Hungary)			RBR (Austria)			SIL2 (United Kingdom)			DON (United Kingdom)			BRH (United Kingdom)			CAT (Spain)			Pts
Pos	Team	R1	R2	R3	R4	R5	R6	R7	R8	R9	R10	R11	R12	R13	R14	R15	R16	R17	R18	R19	R20	R21	R22	R23	R24	Pts
1	(United States) VRD Racing	1	1	4	2	1	C	2	1	5^{7}	1	1	1^{1}	8	5	2	2	5	11	3	3	6	1	1	3^{4}	859
1	(United States) VRD Racing	6	7	5^{2}	13	6	C	10	7	11^{4}	5	5	2^{10}	10	7	4^{3}	10	14	15	8	8	11	13	9	12^{4}	859
2	(New Zealand) Rodin Motorsport	2	2	6^{4}	1	2	C	3	2	4^{4}	3	3	4^{7}	2	4	8	3	3	3^{3}	2	4	7^{1}	8	3	8^{2}	844
2	(New Zealand) Rodin Motorsport	3	20	8	3	3	C	4	4	8^{2}	7	4	Ret	5	6	12	4	6	6^{2}	7	5	9	12	6	10^{7}	844
3	(United Arab Emirates) Xcel Motorsport	5	3	3^{2}	5	8	C	5	3	2^{5}	2	2	7^{2}	3	2	7^{4}	5	4	1^{2}	5	2	1^{3}	2	5	1	769
3	(United Arab Emirates) Xcel Motorsport	12	5	7	Ret	12	C	7	12	3^{1}	10	8	11^{6}	17	3	9^{1}	6	7	4^{3}	9	7	8^{3}	3	15	15^{5}	769
4	(United Kingdom) Hitech	4	4	1^{3}	4	4	C	1	11	6	4	15	10^{9}	1	1	1^{2}	1	1	5^{7}	1	1	2	9	10	6^{12}	739
4	(United Kingdom) Hitech	8	14	14^{2}	12	7	C	9	14	9^{9}	11	17	12^{6}	9	11	10^{2}	11	11	10^{3}	4	9	3^{2}	20	19	Ret	739
5	(United Kingdom) Elite Motorsport	7	6	2	7	9	C	6	5	1	6	9	5^{10}	4	9	3	7	10	7	12	10	10^{8}	4	11	2^{2}	524
5	(United Kingdom) Elite Motorsport	19	12	9	8	11	C	14	9	Ret	13	14	14	11	12	11^{3}	8	Ret	8	14	13	13^{3}	6	20	9^{4}	524
6	(United Kingdom) Hillspeed	15	15	13^{2}	9	13	C	8	6	7	12	11	8^{5}	14	15	16^{2}	9	8	2^{2}	6	6	4^{2}	11	7	4	387
6	(United Kingdom) Hillspeed	16	19	19	14	17	C	11	8	15	Ret	12	9^{5}	15	16	17	14	13	12^{3}	11	12	12	Ret	18	5	387
7	(United Kingdom) Arden Motorsport	10	8	17^{6}	10	10	C	15	13	12^{5}	9	13	3^{2}	7	8	6	18	2	Ret	18	15	17	19	12	11^{4}	240
7	(United Kingdom) Arden Motorsport	18	16	Ret	15	22	C	16	15	13^{6}	Ret	19	Ret										Ret	17	22^{2}	240
8	(United Kingdom) Fortec Motorsports	9	9	10^{3}	11	21	C							Ret	14	14^{3}	12	Ret	DNS							82
8	(United Kingdom) Fortec Motorsports	13	17	16^{6}	WD	WD	C																			82
9	(United Kingdom) Nitrous Competitions ADM Racing	20	18	18^{3}	Ret	18	C							16	17	18^{3}							17	21	16^{9}	35
10	(United Arab Emirates) AKCEL GP																			19	18	19^{1}				6
Teams only fielding non-scoring guest drivers
—	(United Kingdom) JHR Developments																						5	2	14	–
—	(United Kingdom) JHR Developments																						7	8	19	–
—	(United States) TJ Speed Motorsports																						15	13	7^{7}	–
—	(United States) TJ Speed Motorsports																						DNS	14	13^{10}	–
Pos	Team	R1	R2	R3	R4	R5	R6	R7	R8	R9	R10	R11	R12	R13	R14	R15	R16	R17	R18	R19	R20	R21	R22	R23	R24	Pts
Pos	Team	SIL1 (United Kingdom)			SPA (Belgium)			HUN (Hungary)			RBR (Austria)			SIL2 (United Kingdom)			DON (United Kingdom)			BRH (United Kingdom)			CAT (Spain)			Pts
