= Patricio González (racing driver) =

Mexican racing driver (born 2008)

- Nationality: (Mexico) Mexican
- Born: 5 August 2008 (age 18) Mexico City, Mexico
- Relatives: Ricardo González (father); Roberto González (uncle); Rodrigo González (brother)

GB3 Championship career
- Debut season: 2026
- Current team: VRD Racing
- Car number: 21
- Starts: 15
- Wins: 0
- Podiums: 0
- Poles: 0
- Fastest laps: 0
- Best finish: TBD in 2026

Previous series
- 2025 2024–2025 2024: USF 2000; USF Juniors; YACademy Winter Series

Patricio González (born 5 August 2008) is a Mexican racing driver currently competing in the 2026 GB3 Championship with VRD Racing. He is the younger brother of Rodrigo González.

== Career ==
=== American open-wheel racing career ===
==== 2024 ====
Karting from the age of four, he started his single-seater career in YACademy Winter Series, where he came seventh by the seasons end.

With his older brother, Rodrigo, they both made their Road to Indy debut in the USF Juniors for DEForce Racing Driver Development. He achieved five top-ten finishes, with a sixth at Portland International Raceway being his highest.

==== 2025 ====
The brothers renewed their partnership with DEForce Racing for their sophomore year in the USF Juniors. He achieved his first top-five finish in the championship in the third round of the series at Mid-Ohio Sports Car Course. González got a pair of podiums at the next round in Road America and collected a final podium in the last round of the series at Portland International Raceway.

During 2025, he and his brother stepped up to the USF2000 Championship with DEForce Racing for select rounds in the championship. His highest recorded result was a ninth place in the second race of his debut round at Indianapolis Motor Speedway, where he started nineteenth on the grid.

=== GB3 Championship ===
==== 2025 ====
Both González brothers joined VRD Racing for the final half of the GB3 Championship. His best result in the season was a sixth in the second race of the penultimate round at Donington Park.

==== 2026 ====
González contested the full season of the 2026 GB3 Championship for VRD Racing, with the same team as his brother. He ended the first round at Silverstone Circuit with his best result yet of fifth in the third race. González achieved his maiden win in the third race of the next round at the Red Bull Ring.

== Personal life ==
He and his older brother Rodrigo, are the sons of former racing driver Ricardo González, who won the 2013 FIA World Endurance Championship. Their uncle, onetime Champ Car racer Roberto Gonzalez, also won the World Endurance Championship in 2022. They have a cousin Matias Gonzalez Negri, who is currently competing in karts. Rodrigo began karting as Patricio was doing it as well.

== Karting record ==
=== Karting career summary ===
Season	Series	Team	Position
2023	SKUSA SuperNationals – KA100 Junior	Supertune USA	23rd
2024	SKUSA SuperNationals – KA100 Senior	Supertune USA	53rd

== Racing record ==
=== Racing career summary ===
Season	Series	Team	Races	Wins	Poles	F/Laps	Podiums	Points	Position
2024	YACademy Winter Series		?	?	?	?	?	?	7th
2024	USF Juniors	DEForce Racing Driver Development	16	0	0	0	0	124	15th
2025	YACademy Winter Series		?	?	?	?	?	?	8th
2025	USF Juniors	DEForce Racing	16	0	0	0	3	208	8th
2025	USF2000 Championship	DEForce Racing	7	0	0	0	0	56	20th
2025	GB3 Championship	VRD Racing	12	0	0	0	0	79	21st
2026	GB3 Championship	VRD Racing	23	1	0	0	1	287	7th

* Season still in progress.

=== American open-wheel racing results ===
==== USF Juniors ====
(key) (Races in bold indicate pole position) (Races in italics indicate fastest lap) (Races with * indicate most race laps led)

Year	Team	1	2	3	4	5	6	7	8	9	10	11	12	13	14	15	16	Rank	Points
2024	DEForce Racing Driver Development	NOL; 1; 19	NOL; 2; 20	NOL; 3; 16	ALA; 1; 24	ALA; 2; 9	VIR; 1; 14	VIR; 2; 10	VIR; 3; 16	MOH; 1; 12	MOH; 2; 12	ROA; 1; 9	ROA; 2; 15	ROA; 3; 10	POR; 1; 6	POR; 2; 14	POR; 3; 12	15th	124
2025	DEForce Racing	NOL; 1; 18	NOL; 2; 12	NOL; 3; 9	ALA; 1; 7	ALA; 2; 20	ALA; 3; 9	MOH1; 1; 9	MOH1; 2; 4	MOH2; 1; 10	MOH2; 2; 13	ROA; 1; 5	ROA; 2; 3	ROA; 3; 3	POR; 1; 14	POR; 2; 5	POR; 3; 3	8th	208

==== USF2000 Championship ====
(key) (Races in bold indicate pole position) (Races in italics indicate fastest lap) (Races with * indicate most race laps led)

Year	Team	1	2	3	4	5	6	7	8	9	10	11	12	13	14	15	16	17	18	Rank	Points
2025	DEForce Racing	STP; 1	STP; 2	NOL; 1	NOL; 2	NOL; 3	IMS; 1; 13	IMS; 2; 9	IRP; 18	ROA; 1; 11	ROA; 2; 21	MOH; 1	MOH; 2	MOH; 3	TOR; 1; 12	TOR; 2; 10	POR; 1	POR; 2	POR; 3	20th	56

=== Complete GB3 Championship results ===
(key) (Races in bold indicate pole position) (Races in italics indicate fastest lap)

Year	Team	1	2	3	4	5	6	7	8	9	10	11	12	13	14	15	16	17	18	19	20	21	22	23	24	DC	Points
2025	VRD Racing	SIL1; 1	SIL1; 2	SIL1; 3	ZAN; 1	ZAN; 2	ZAN; 3	SPA; 1	SPA; 2	SPA; 3	HUN; 1	HUN; 2	HUN; 3	SIL2; 1 Ret	SIL2; 2; 12	SIL2; 3; 16^{3}	BRH; 1; 19	BRH; 2; 17	BRH; 3; 16^{4}	DON; 1; 12	DON; 2; 6	DON; 3; 10^{5}	MNZ; 1; 14	MNZ; 2; 9	MNZ; 3; 15	21st	79
2026	VRD Racing	SIL1; 1; 6	SIL1; 2; 11	SIL1; 3; 5^{2}	SPA; 1 Ret	SPA; 2; 6	SPA; 3 C	HUN; 1; 10	HUN; 2; 7	HUN; 3; 14^{2}	RBR; 1; 5	RBR; 2; 5	RBR; 3; 1^{1}	SIL2; 1; 10	SIL2; 2; 7	SIL2; 3; 4^{3}	DON; 1; 10	DON; 2; 5	DON; 3; 11	BRH; 1; 8	BRH; 2; 8	BRH; 3; 6	CAT; 1; 13	CAT; 2; 9	CAT; 3; 12^{4}	7th	287

* Season still in progress.
