= Maxim Rehm =

German retired racing driver (born 2007)

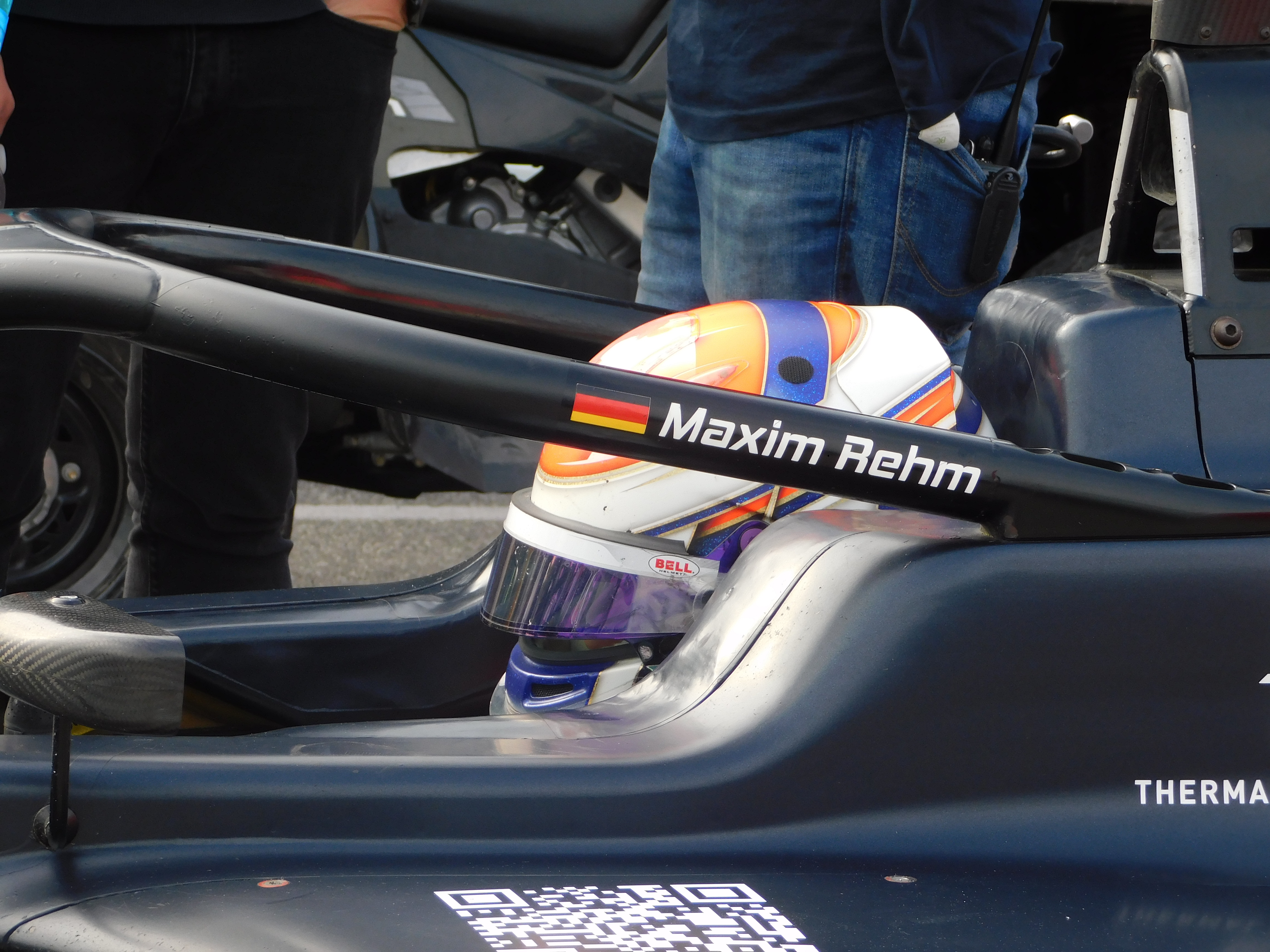
- Rehm in 2024
- Nationality: Germany
- Born: 11 September 2007 (age 19) Ulm, Germany

GB3 Championship career
- Debut season: 2025
- Current team: Rodin Motorsport
- Car number: 1
- Starts: 26
- Wins: 0
- Podiums: 6
- Poles: 0
- Fastest laps: 1
- Best finish: 5th in 2026

Previous series
- 2026 2024 2024–2025 2024–2025: FR Middle East; Euro 4 Italian F4; Formula Winter Series

Maxim Rehm (born 11 September 2007) is a German retired racing driver. He previously competed in Italian F4 with US Racing and in the GB3 Championship with Rodin Motorsport.

== Career ==
=== Karting (2016–2023) ===
Rehm had a highly successful karting career. He started karting in Germany, and won numerous titles in the country including the ADAC Kart Masters in 2018 in the Bambini category, and the ADAC Kart Cup in 2019 in the OKJ category. Rehm began karting on the European stage in 2018, where he entered the WSK Champions Cup in the 60 Mini category. Rehm continued to kart in both German and European karting championships throughout his career, and his most notable result was when he won the Deutsche Kart Meisterschaft in 2022, in the OK category. In 2023, he competed in senior karting.

=== Formula 4 (2024–2025) ===
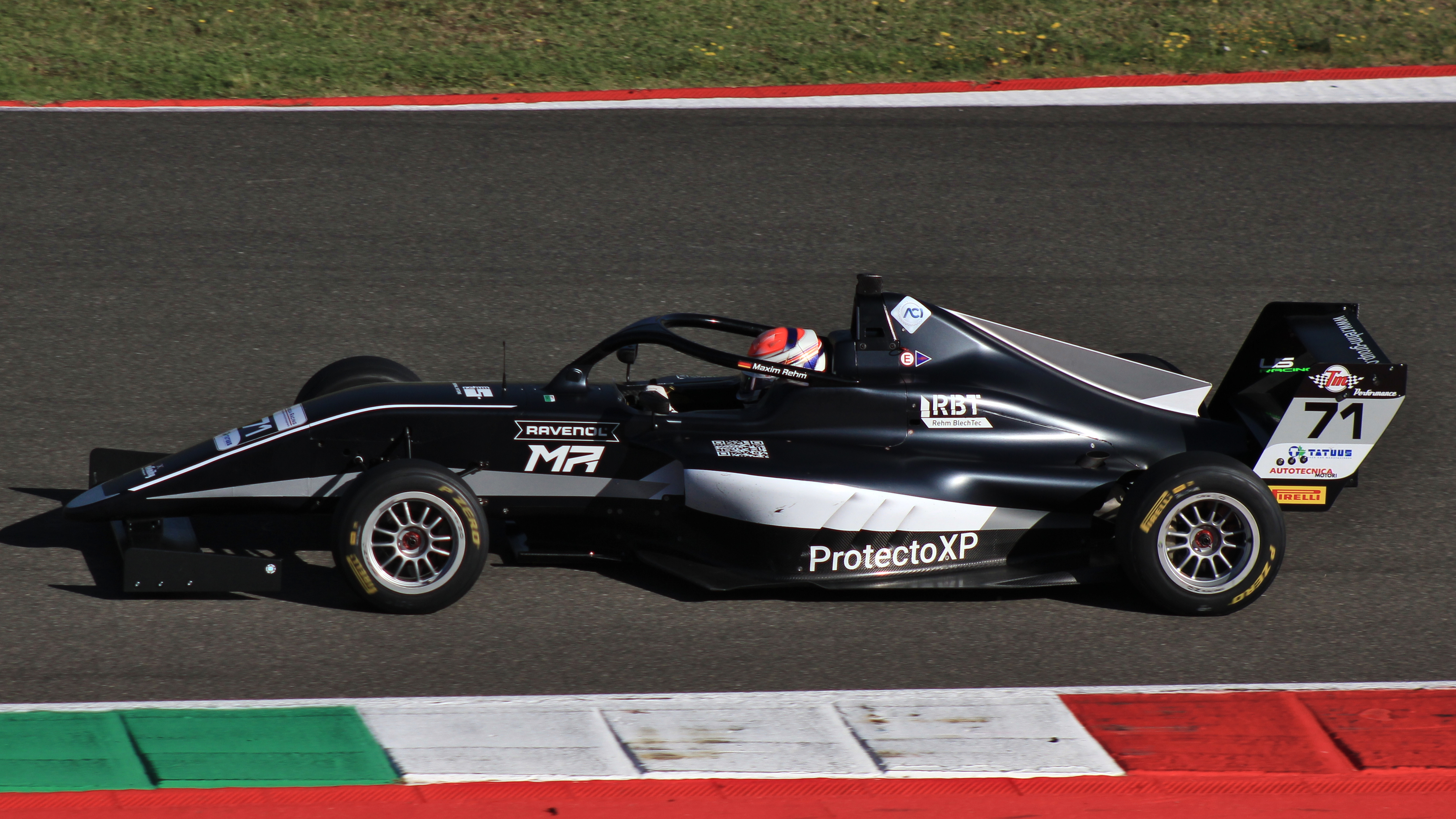
Rehm driving at the Mugello Circuit during the 2024 Italian F4 Championship

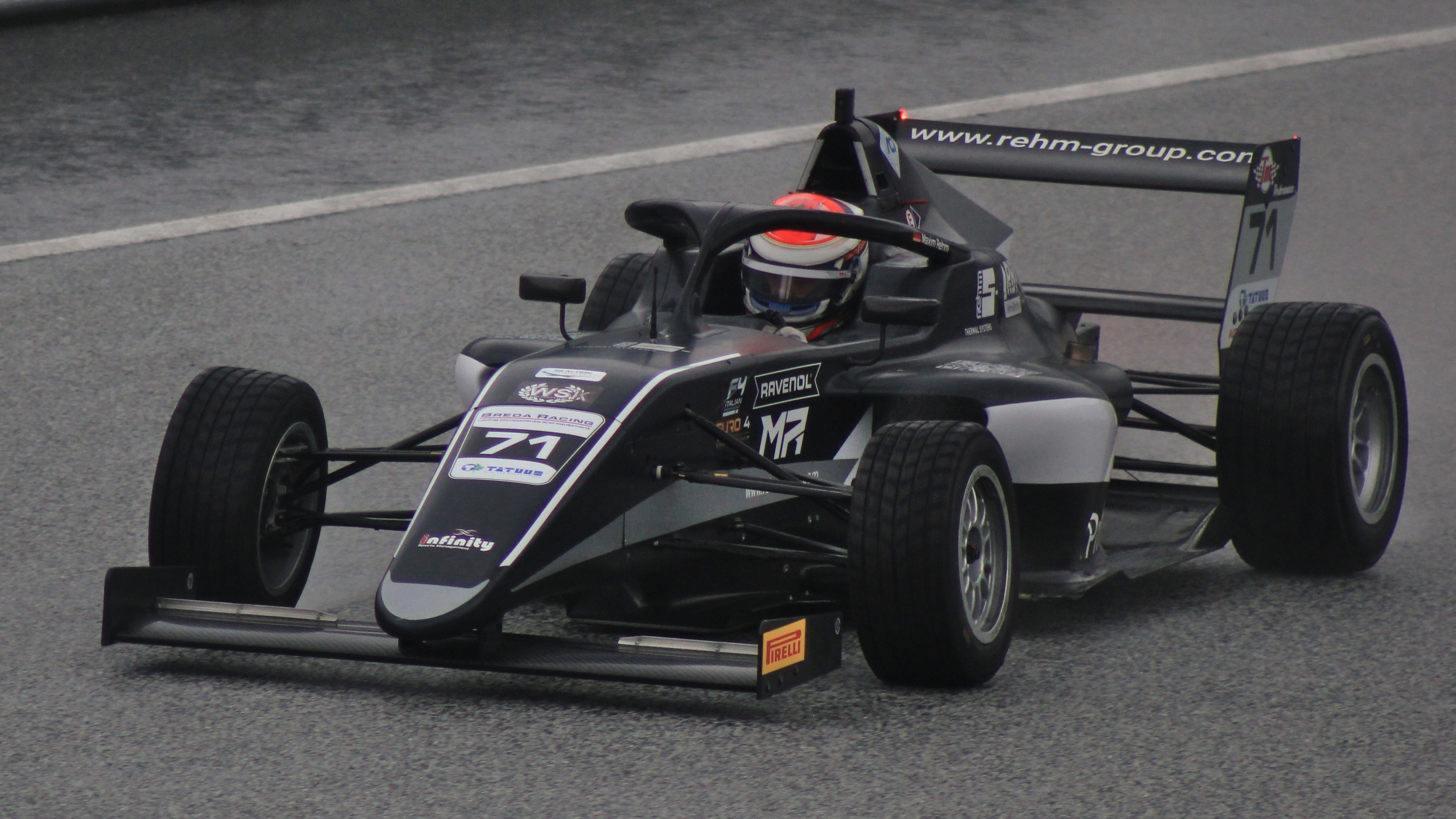
Rehm driving at the Red Bull Ring during the 2024 Euro 4 Championship

In 2024, Rehm would begin his car racing career with US Racing, as he joined the German team for three championships; the 2024 Formula Winter Series, Italian F4 Championship and Euro 4 Championship. In the Formula Winter Series, he had a good rookie season among a group of experienced drivers, finishing in 21st in the championship on nine points. He scored his highest finish with a seventh place at Ricardo Tormo. Rehm began his Italian F4 season in strong fashion, scoring a podium at Imola. He finished the season 13th in the standings. Later that year, Rehm also drove in the Euro 4 Championship with the same team.

Rehm returned to the Formula Winter Series in 2025 with US Racing. For his main season, Rehm would compete in Italian F4 again with US Racing.

=== GB3 Championship (2025–2026) ===
In October 2025, Rehm took part in the final round of the 2025 GB3 Championship in Monza with Hillspeed. He won the last race of the season but since Rehm was only a guest driver, he was not eligible to score any points.

During the 2026 pre-season, Rehm raced in the Formula Regional Middle East Trophy with Rodin Motorsport. Rehm switched to GB3 Championship full-time with Rodin Motorsport for 2026. Rehm announced his retirement from racing at the end of the season.

== Personal life ==
Following his retirement, Rehm will study international business.

== Karting record ==
=== Karting career summary ===
Season	Series	Team	Position
2016	Kart Trophy Weiss-Blau - Raket Rookie	AMC Ehingen	1st
2017	ADAC Kart Masters - Bambini		7th
2017	ADAC Kart Bundesendlauf - Bambini		6th
2018	ADAC Kart Masters - Bambini		1st
2018	WSK Champions Cup - 60 Mini	Evokart	NC
2018	WSK Super Master Series - 60 Mini	Evokart	61st
2018	South Garda Winter Cup - Mini Rok	Evokart	NC
2019	South Garda Winter Cup - OKJ	Rehm Racing	NC
2019	WSK Super Master Series - OKJ	Rehm Racing	75th
2019	WSK Euro Series - OKJ	Rehm Racing	97th
2019	WSK Open Cup - OKJ	Rehm Racing	54th
2019	Deutsche Kart Meisterschaft - OKJ	Rehm Racing	17th
2019	ADAC Kart Bundesendlauf - OKJ	Rehm Racing	3rd
2019	ADAC Kart Cup - OKJ	Rehm Racing	1st
2019	ADAC Kart Masters - OKJ	Rehm Racing	4th
2020	WSK Champions Cup - OKJ	Rehm Racing	NC
2020	ADAC Kart Masters - OKJ	Rehm Racing	NC
2020	WSK Super Master Series - OKJ	Tony Kart Racing Team	33rd
2020	South Garda Winter Cup - OKJ	Tony Kart Racing Team	33rd
2020	WSK Euro Series - OKJ	Tony Kart Racing Team	26th
2020	Champions of the Future - OKJ	Tony Kart Racing Team	NC
2020	CIK-FIA European Championship - OKJ	Tony Kart Racing Team	18th
2020	CIK-FIA World Championship - OKJ	Tony Kart Racing Team	NC
2020	WSK Open Cup - OKJ	Ricky Flynn Motorsport	24th
2021	ADAC Kart Masters - OKJ	Rehm Racing	10th
2021	WSK Champions Cup - OKJ	Ricky Flynn Motorsport	NC
2021	WSK Super Master Series - OKJ	Ricky Flynn Motorsport	14th
2021	WSK Euro Series - OKJ	Ricky Flynn Motorsport	6th
2021	Champions of the Future - OKJ	Ricky Flynn Motorsport	14th
2021	Deutsche Kart Meisterschaft - OKJ	Ricky Flynn Motorsport	2nd
2021	CIK-FIA European Championship - OKJ	Ricky Flynn Motorsport	19th
2021	CIK-FIA World Championship - OKJ	Ricky Flynn Motorsport	21st
2021	WSK Final Cup - OKJ	Ricky Flynn Motorsport	12th
2021	SKUSA SuperNationals - X30 Senior	Ryan Perry Motorsport	NC
2022	WSK Super Master Series - OK	Ricky Flynn Motorsport	45th
2022	Champions of the Future Winter Series - OK	Ricky Flynn Motorsport	12th
2022	Champions of the Future - OK	Ricky Flynn Motorsport	26th
2022	Deutsche Kart Meisterschaft - OK	Rehm Racing	1st
2022	CIK-FIA European Championship - OK	Ricky Flynn Motorsport	36th
2022	WSK Euro Series - OK	Ricky Flynn Motorsport	54th
2022	Italian ACI Championship - OK		12th
2022	CIK-FIA World Championship - OK	Ricky Flynn Motorsport	30th
2022	WSK Final Cup - OK	Rehm Racing	37th
2022	LeCont Trophy - OK		4th
2023	WSK Super Master Series - OK	Ricky Flynn Motorsport	28th
2023	WSK Super Master Series - KZ2	Leclerc by Lennox Racing Team	17th
2023	Andrea Margutti Trophy - KZ2	Leclerc by Lennox Racing Team	13th
2023	CIK-FIA European Championship - KZ2	Leclerc by Lennox Racing Team	13th
2023	Deutsche Kart Meisterschaft - KZ2		15th
2023	WSK Open Series - KZ2	Leclerc by Lennox Racing Team	42nd
2023	CIK-FIA World Cup - KZ2	Leclerc by Lennox Racing Team	25th

== Racing record ==
=== Racing career summary ===
Season	Series	Team	Races	Wins	Poles	F/Laps	Podiums	Points	Position
2024	Formula Winter Series	US Racing	11	0	0	0	0	9	21st
2024	Italian F4 Championship	US Racing	21	0	0	0	1	39	13th
2024	Euro 4 Championship	US Racing	9	1	1	0	1	63	6th
2025	Formula Winter Series	US Racing	12	1	1	1	3	89	5th
2025	Italian F4 Championship	US Racing	14	0	0	0	0	27	19th
2025	GB3 Championship	Hillspeed	3	1	0	0	1	0	NC†
2026	Formula Regional Middle East Trophy	Rodin Motorsport	10	0	0	0	0	6	20th
2026	GB3 Championship	Rodin Motorsport	23	0	0	1	6	340	5th

* Season still in progress.

=== Complete Formula Winter Series results ===
(key) (Races in bold indicate pole position; races in italics indicate fastest lap)

Year	Team	1	2	3	4	5	6	7	8	9	10	11	12	DC	Points
2024	US Racing	JER; 1; 12	JER; 2; 11	JER; 3; 12	CRT; 1; 17	CRT; 2; 10	CRT; 3; 7	ARA; 1; 11	ARA; 2; 9	ARA; 3 DSQ	CAT; 1 C	CAT; 2; 14	CAT; 3; 15	21st	9
2025	US Racing	POR; 1 DSQ	POR; 2 DSQ	POR; 3 DSQ	CRT; 1; 3	CRT; 2; 1	CRT; 3; 7	ARA; 1 Ret	ARA; 2; 7	ARA; 3; 2	CAT; 1; 6	CAT; 2; 7	**CAT**; **3** Ret	5th	89

=== Complete Italian F4 Championship results ===
(key) (Races in bold indicate pole position; races in italics indicate fastest lap)

Year	Team	1	2	3	4	5	6	7	8	9	10	11	12	13	14	15	16	17	18	19	20	21	22	23	24	25	DC	Points
2024	US Racing	MIS; 1; 18	MIS; 2; 17	MIS; 3; 25	IMO; 1; 6	IMO; 2; 36†	IMO; 3; 3	VLL; 1; 31†	VLL; 2; 16	VLL; 3; 16	MUG; 1; 12	MUG; 2 Ret	MUG; 3; 11	LEC; 1; 9	LEC; 2 Ret	LEC; 3; 24	CAT; 1; 5	CAT; 2; 12	CAT; 3; 12	MNZ; 1; 8	MNZ; 2; 13	MNZ; 3 Ret					13th	39
2025	US Racing	MIS1; 1; 10	MIS1; 2	MIS1; 3; 9	MIS1; 4; 15	VLL; 1; 4	VLL; 2	VLL; 3 Ret	VLL; 4; 18	MNZ; 1 Ret	MNZ; 2; 9	MNZ; 3; 13	MUG; 1; 6	MUG; 2; 14	MUG; 3; 22	IMO; 1; 9	IMO; 2 C	IMO; 3; 30†	CAT; 1	CAT; 2	CAT; 3	MIS2; 1	MIS2; 2	MIS2; 3	MIS2; 4	MIS2; 5	19th	27

=== Complete Euro 4 Championship results ===
(key) (Races in bold indicate pole position; races in italics indicate fastest lap)

Year	Team	1	2	3	4	5	6	7	8	9	DC	Points
2024	US Racing	MUG; 1; 8	MUG; 2; 6	MUG; 3 Ret	RBR; 1; 5	RBR; 2; 4	RBR; 3; 25	**MNZ**; **1** Ret	MNZ; 2; 8	MNZ; 3; 1	6th	63

=== Complete GB3 Championship results ===
(key) (Races in bold indicate pole position) (Races in italics indicate fastest lap)

Year	Team	1	2	3	4	5	6	7	8	9	10	11	12	13	14	15	16	17	18	19	20	21	22	23	24	DC	Points
2025	Hillspeed	SIL1; 1	SIL1; 2	SIL1; 3	ZAN; 1	ZAN; 2	ZAN; 3	SPA; 1	SPA; 2	SPA; 3	HUN; 1	HUN; 2	HUN; 3	SIL2; 1	SIL2; 2	SIL2; 3	BRH; 1	BRH; 2	BRH; 3	DON; 1	DON; 2	DON; 3	MNZ; 1; 6	MNZ; 2 Ret	MNZ; 3; 1	NC†	0
2026	Rodin Motorsport	SIL1; 1; 3	SIL1; 2; 2	SIL1; 3; 6^{4}	SPA; 1; 6	SPA; 2; 2	SPA; 3 C	HUN; 1; 3	HUN; 2 Ret	HUN; 3; 4^{4}	RBR; 1; 7	RBR; 2; 3	RBR; 3 Ret	SIL2; 1; 5	SIL2; 2; 6	SIL2; 3; 8	DON; 1 Ret	DON; 2; 6	DON; 3; 6^{2}	BRH; 1; 2	BRH; 2; 5	BRH; 3; 7^{1}	CAT; 1; 18	CAT; 2 Ret	CAT; 3; 10^{7}	5th	340

^{†} As Rehm was a guest driver, he was ineligible to score points.

=== Complete Formula Regional Middle East Trophy results ===
(key) (Races in bold indicate pole position) (Races in italics indicate fastest lap)

Year	Entrant	1	2	3	4	5	6	7	8	9	10	11	12	DC	Points
2026	Rodin Motorsport	YMC1; 1; 9	YMC1; 2; 27	YMC1; 3 Ret	YMC2; 1; 27	YMC2; 2; 16	YMC2; 3; 17	DUB; 1; 18	DUB; 2; 8	DUB; 3; 27	LUS; 1 Ret	LUS; 2 C	LUS; 3 DNS	20th	6
