= Flynn Jackes =

Filipino and Australian racing driver (born 2003)

- Jackes in 2025
- Nationality: (Philippines) Filipino (Australia) Australian
- Born: 2 May 2003 (age 23) Manila, Philippines

GB3 Championship career
- Debut season: 2021
- Current team: Elite Motorsport
- Car number: 18
- Former teams: Chris Dittmann Racing; Hillspeed
- Starts: 67
- Wins: 1
- Podiums: 3
- Poles: 0
- Fastest laps: 1
- Best finish: 9th in 2026

Flynn Keeling Jackes (born 2 May 2003) is a Filipino and Australian racing driver who last competed in the GB3 Championship for Elite Motorsport.

== Personal life ==
Flynn Keeling Jackes was born in Manila, to Ross Jackes, an Australian businessman and amateur racing driver, and Daisy Jackes, a Filipina amateur racing driver.

== Career ==
=== Karting (2010–2021) ===
Jackes began karting in 2010 after attending the Tuason Racing School. Starting out his career in the Philippines, Jackes won the Mini ROK national title and the Coca-Cola Mini-ROK Cup Series in 2012, as well as finishing third in the Asian Open Karting Championship, before clinching the title the following year.

After securing his second consecutive AOKC title in 2014, Jackes moved to Australia in 2015 and also began racing internationally, a year in which he most notably finished ninth in the South Garda Winter Cup's Mini ROK category. Following an appearance at the IAME International Final in X30 Junior in 2016 and an international programme the following year, Jackes remained in Australia until 2021 to see out his karting career.

=== GB3 (2021, 2024–present) ===
Despite testing Formula 4 machinery as early as 2017, Jackes had to wait until late 2021 for his single-seater racing debut, doing so at the Donington Park finale of the GB3 Championship for Hillspeed. Competing under an Australian licence, Jackes scored a best finish of 17th in races one and three. Three years later, Jackes returned to the series with a Filipino licence, joining Chris Dittmann Racing for his full-time debut in GB3, in which he took a best result of 11th at Zandvoort, but his season was cut short with two rounds to go after breaking his leg in a traffic accident.

Moving to Elite Motorsport for 2025, Jackes struggled during the season due to being over the series' weight limit after recovering from his broken leg, only taking a best result of fourth at the Hungaroring and finished 20th in points. Continuing with Elite for 2026, Jackes had a breakthrough start to the season as he led the majority of the reverse-grid race at the Silverstone opener en route to his first-career podium behind Jin Nakamura. Two rounds later, Jackes led the reverse-grid Hungaroring race from lights to flag to clinch his maiden series win, before ending the season with a podium at Barcelona to take ninth in points.

== Karting record ==
=== Karting career summary ===
Season	Series	Team	Position
2012	Philippine Championship — Mini ROK		1st
2012	Coca-Cola Mini-ROK Cup Series		1st
2012	Asian Open Karting Championship — Mini ROK		3rd
2013	Asian Open Karting Championship — Mini ROK		1st
2014	Asian Open Karting Championship — Mini ROK		1st
2015	South Garda Winter Cup — Mini ROK	Ward Racing	9th
2015	Australian Kart Championship — KF3		
2016	IAME International Final — X30 Junior		78th
2017	South Garda Winter Cup — OK-J	Piers Sexton Racing	33rd
2017	WSK Super Master Series — OK-J	Piers Sexton Racing	50th
2017	Karting World Championship — OK	Piers Sexton Racing	84th
2019	Australian Kart Championship — TAG 125		11th
2020	Australian Kart Championship — KZ2		8th
2021	Australian Kart Championship — KZ2		37th

== Racing record ==
=== Career summary ===
Season	Series	Team	Races	Wins	Poles	F/Laps	Podiums	Points	Position
2021	GB3 Championship	Hillspeed	3	0	0	0	0	6	28th
2024	GB3 Championship	Chris Dittmann Racing	17	0	0	0	0	75	21st
2025	GB3 Championship	Elite Motorsport	24	0	0	0	0	94	20th
2026	GB3 Championship	Elite Motorsport	23	1	0	1	3	255	9th

=== Complete GB3 Championship results ===
(key) (Races in bold indicate pole position) (Races in italics indicate fastest lap)

Year	Team	1	2	3	4	5	6	7	8	9	10	11	12	13	14	15	16	17	18	19	20	21	22	23	24	DC	Points
2021	Hillspeed	BRH; 1	BRH; 2	BRH; 3	SIL1; 1	SIL1; 2	SIL1; 3	DON1; 1	DON1; 2	DON1; 3	SPA; 1	SPA; 2	SPA; 3	SNE; 1	SNE; 2	SNE; 3	SIL2; 1	SIL2; 2	SIL2; 3	OUL; 1	OUL; 2	OUL; 3	DON2; 1; 17	DON2; 2; 19	DON2; 3; 17	28th	6
2024	Chris Dittmann Racing	OUL; 1; 16	OUL; 2; 14	OUL; 3; 16^{1}	SIL1; 1; 21	SIL1; 2; 19	SIL1; 3 C	SPA; 1; 17	SPA; 2; 14	SPA; 3; 10^{6}	HUN; 1; 21	HUN; 2; 17	HUN; 3; 15	ZAN; 1; 12	ZAN; 2; 11	ZAN; 3; 15^{3}	SIL2; 1; 18	SIL2; 2; 22	SIL2; 3; 17^{6}	DON; 1 WD	DON; 2 WD	DON; 3 WD	BRH; 1	BRH; 2	BRH; 3	21st	75
2025	Elite Motorsport	SIL1; 1; 21	SIL1; 2; 19	SIL1; 3; 17^{6}	ZAN; 1; 16	ZAN; 2; 18	ZAN; 3 Ret	SPA; 1; 18	SPA; 2; 22	SPA; 3; 20	HUN; 1 Ret	HUN; 2; 14	HUN; 3; 4	SIL2; 1; 18	SIL2; 2; 13	SIL2; 3; 15^{2}	BRH; 1; 15	BRH; 2; 16	BRH; 3; 14^{3}	DON; 1; 14	DON; 2; 17	DON; 3 Ret	MNZ; 1; 16	MNZ; 2; 12	MNZ; 3; 20	20th	94
2026	Elite Motorsport	SIL1; 1 Ret	SIL1; 2; 12	SIL1; 3; 2	SPA; 1; 8	SPA; 2; 11	SPA; 3 C	HUN; 1; 14	HUN; 2; 9	HUN; 3; 1	RBR; 1; 13	RBR; 2; 14	RBR; 3; 5^{10}	SIL2; 1; 4	SIL2; 2; 9	SIL2; 3; 13	DON; 1; 7	DON; 2 Ret	DON; 3; 8	BRH; 1; 12	BRH; 2; 13	BRH; 3; 10^{8}	CAT; 1; 4	CAT; 2; 20	CAT; 3; 2^{2}	9th	255

* Season still in progress.
