= 2025 GB3 Championship =

Motor racing championship

The 2025 GB3 Championship was a motor racing championship for open wheel, formula racing cars held across Europe. The 2025 season was the tenth organised by the British Racing Drivers' Club in the United Kingdom, and the fifth season under the GB3 moniker after rebranding from the BRDC British Formula 3 Championship in mid-2021. The championship featured a mix of professional motor racing teams and privately funded drivers. The season was run over eight triple-header rounds. It started in April and ended in October.

Rodin Motorsport driver Alex Ninovic won the Drivers' Championship with three races to spare, while his team defended their Teams' Championship title a race later during the final weekend.

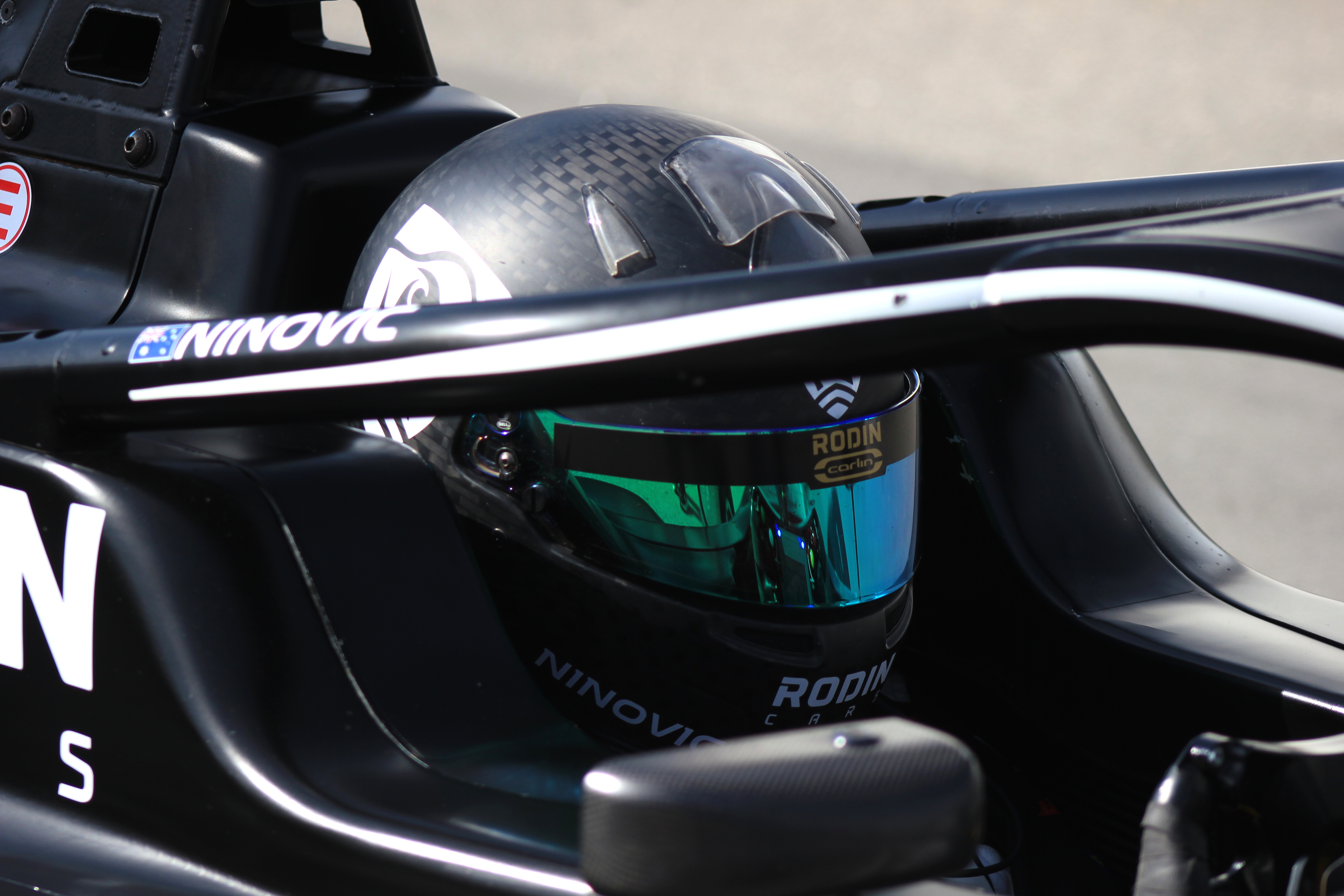
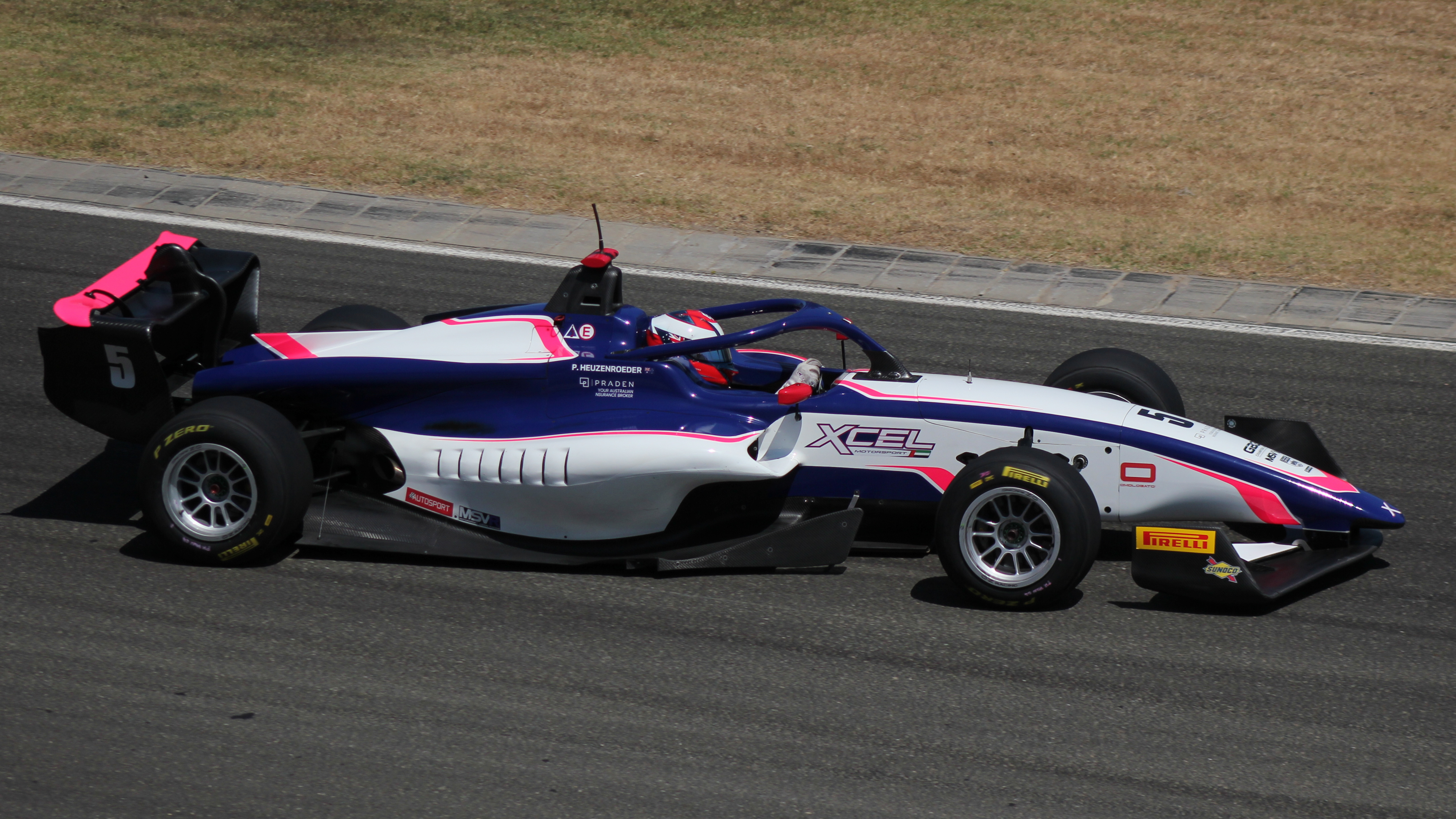
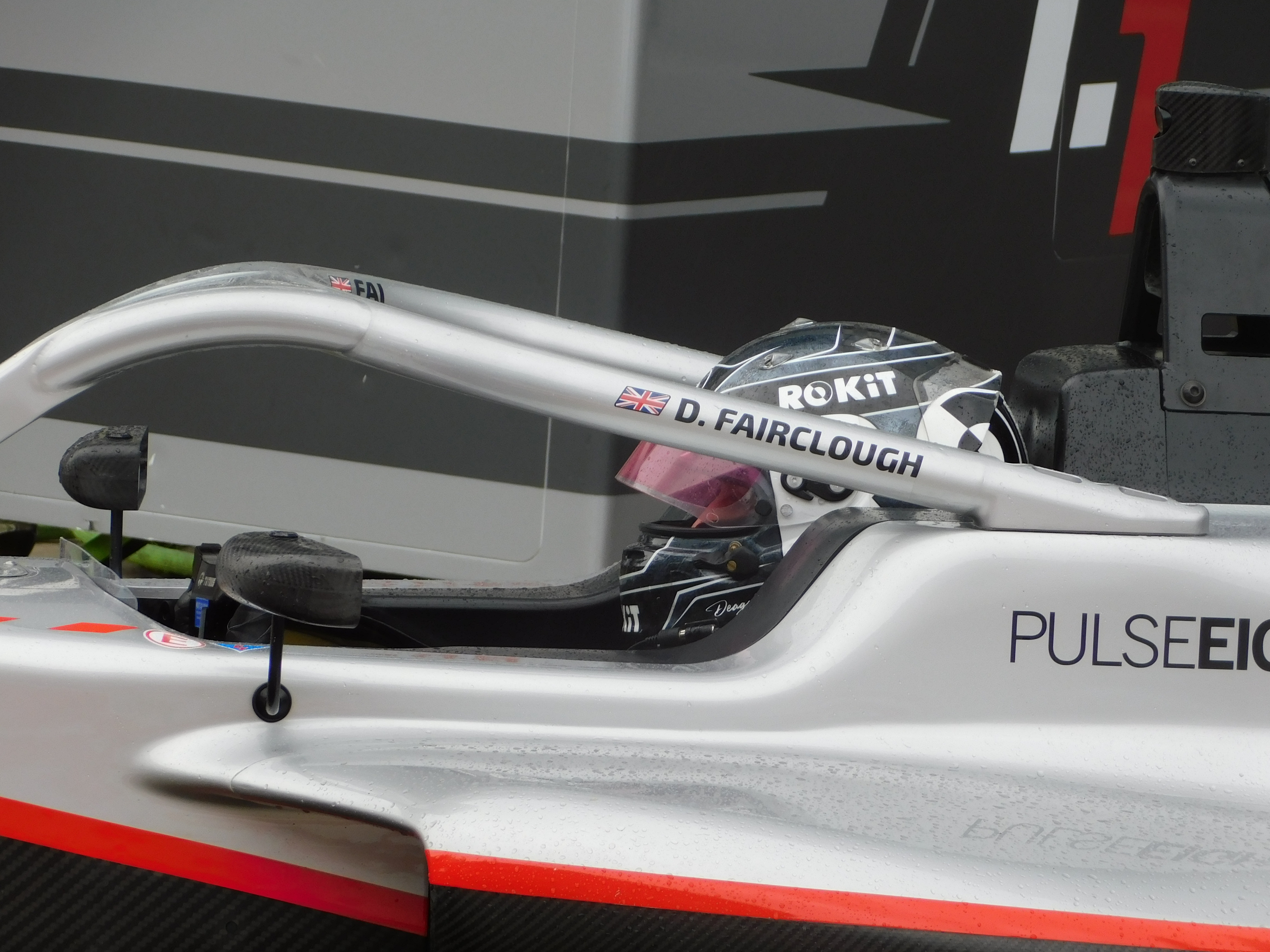
Rodin Motorsport driver Alex Ninovic (top) won the Drivers' Championship, with his team also winning the Teams' Championship. Patrick Heuzenroeder (middle), finished runner-up in the championship driving for Xcel Motorsport. Hitech TGR driver Deagen Fairclough (bottom), finished the championship in third place.

== Teams and drivers ==
The 2025 season saw the introduction of a new chassis and engine package. The new Tatuus MSV GB3-025 conformed to the FIA Formula Regional regulations while featuring a higher downforce output than its predecessor as well as a drag reduction system. The Pirelli tyres used had their diameter increased by two inches, while the Mountune engine was also redesigned and now provided 30BHP more power.

Team	No.	Driver	Status	Rounds
(United Kingdom) Racelab	2	(United States) Max Taylor		7
(United Kingdom) Argenti with Prema	10	(United Kingdom) Reza Seewooruthun		All
(United Kingdom) Argenti with Prema	47	(Sweden) August Raber		5, 8
(United Kingdom) Argenti with Prema	56	(China) Yuanpu Cui		1–4
(United Kingdom) Argenti with Prema	3	(Spain) Lucas Fluxá		1–6
(United Kingdom) Hillspeed	3	(Spain) Lucas Fluxá		7–8
(United Kingdom) Hillspeed	19	(Japan) Kanato Le		1, 3, 6
(United Kingdom) Hillspeed	24	(South Korea) Michael Shin		5
(United Kingdom) Hillspeed	27	(United Kingdom) Freddie Slater		1, 3, 6
(United Kingdom) Hillspeed	28	(China) Newman Chi	G	8
(United Kingdom) Hillspeed	56	(China) Yuanpu Cui		5
(United Kingdom) Hillspeed	66	(Japan) Hiyu Yamakoshi		1, 3, 6
(United Kingdom) Hillspeed	71	(Germany) Maxim Rehm	G	8
(United Kingdom) Hitech TGR	4	(United States) Nikita Johnson		1–3, 6
(United Kingdom) Hitech TGR	6	(United Arab Emirates) Keanu Al Azhari		All
(United Kingdom) Hitech TGR	7	(United Kingdom) Deagen Fairclough		All
(United Arab Emirates) Xcel Motorsport	5	(Australia) Patrick Heuzenroeder		All
(United Arab Emirates) Xcel Motorsport	25	(India) Dion Gowda		1, 3
(United Arab Emirates) Xcel Motorsport	44	(Sri Lanka) Yevan David		5
(United Arab Emirates) Xcel Motorsport	78	(United Kingdom) Jack Sherwood		All
(United Arab Emirates) Xcel Motorsport	95	(Singapore) Kabir Anurag		7–8
(United States) VRD Racing	8	(Thailand) Enzo Tarnvanichkul		1, 5–8
(United States) VRD Racing	14	(Mexico) Rodrigo González		6–8
(United States) VRD Racing	33	(Germany) Hugo Schwarze		1–5
(United States) VRD Racing	35	(Mexico) Patricio González		5–8
(New Zealand) Rodin Motorsport	9	(United Kingdom) Abbi Pulling		All
(New Zealand) Rodin Motorsport	12	(Australia) Alex Ninovic		All
(New Zealand) Rodin Motorsport	21	(Australia) Gianmarco Pradel		All
(United Kingdom) JHR Developments	11	(Australia) Noah Lisle		All
(United Kingdom) JHR Developments	17	(India) Divy Nandan		2–3, 5
(United Kingdom) JHR Developments	77	(United Kingdom) Bart Harrison		7–8
(United Kingdom) JHR Developments	88	(India) Kai Daryanani		All
(United Kingdom) Elite Motorsport	16	(Philippines) Bianca Bustamante		All
(United Kingdom) Elite Motorsport	37	(United Kingdom) William Macintyre		1–6
(United Kingdom) Elite Motorsport	55	(Philippines) Flynn Jackes		All
(United Kingdom) Elite Motorsport	67	(United Kingdom) Isaac Phelps	G	8
(United Kingdom) Chris Dittmann Racing	14	(Mexico) Rodrigo González		5
(United Kingdom) Chris Dittmann Racing	15	(Australia) Nicolas Stati		5
(United Kingdom) Chris Dittmann Racing	17	(India) Divy Nandan		1
(United Kingdom) Fortec Motorsport	23	(Bulgaria) Stefan Bostandjiev		1–3
(United Kingdom) Fortec Motorsport	29	(South Africa) Mika Abrahams		1
(United Kingdom) Fortec Motorsport	48	(United Kingdom) Liam McNeilly		7

Icon	Class
G	Guest

- Rashid Al Dhaheri was announced for a part-time campaign with Chris Dittmann Racing ahead of the season, but did not enter any rounds.

=== Team changes ===
VRD Racing became its own entry in 2025 after entering GB3 in collaboration with Arden International in 2024, while Arden discontinued their GB3 efforts.

UAE-based team Xcel Motorsport expanded into GB3 after first entering the British junior series landscape when it joined British F4 in 2024.

Argenti Motorsport, who had been competing in British F4 since 2020, joined GB3 in a technical partnership with Italian junior single-seater team Prema Racing under the Argenti with Prema guise.

Hitech Grand Prix and Toyota Gazoo Racing's TGR-DC junior programme formed a new collaboration in 2025, entering under the Hitech TGR guise.

=== Driver changes ===
Reigning Teams' Champion Rodin Motorsport entered 2025 with three new drivers as reigning Drivers' Champion Louis Sharp graduated to the team's FIA F3 outfit, Arthur Rogeon moved to the Le Mans Cup with CD Sport and neither of the team's four part-time drivers of 2024 returned. Rodin promoted British F4 runner-up Alex Ninovic and 2024 F1 Academy champion Abbi Pulling from their outfits in the respective championships, with Pulling receiving a fully-funded seat because of her championship title. Gianmarco Pradel, who finished 7th in Italian F4 with US Racing, completed the team's lineup, debuting in GB3.

Hitech GP also had an all-new driver lineup as William Macintyre moved to Elite Motorsport, Gerrard Xie stepped up to the team's FIA Formula 3 outfit and Tymek Kucharczyk left the team and the series to join BVM Racing in Euroformula Open. Hitech promoted 2024 F4 British Champion Deagen Fairclough from its outfit in that championship, signed USF Pro 2000 Championship runner-up Nikita Johnson, who also came eleventh in GB3 in 2024 with VRD Racing by Arden, and recruited Alpine Academy driver Keanu Al Azhari, who was 2024 F4 Spanish runner-up with MP Motorsport.

Elite Motorsport's three drivers all left the series, with McKenzy Cresswell joining the team's outfit in the GT4 European Series, Jarrod Waberski signing with Century Motorsport in the GT World Challenge Europe Endurance Cup and Hugo Schwarze moving to the Le Mans Cup's LMP3 class with R-ace GP. The team signed two second-year drivers in William Macintyre, who left Hitech Pulse-Eight after coming fifth in 2024 to return to the team he competed for in the Ginetta Junior Championship, and Flynn Jackes, who joins Elite after finishing the 2024 season in 21st competing for Chris Dittmann Racing. Bianca Bustamante, who spent 2024 racing in F1 Academy, where she finished seventh with ART Grand Prix, completed Elite's lineup.

JHR Developments downsized from three to two entries after John Bennett stepped up to Formula 2 with Van Amersfoort Racing, Patrick Heuzenroeder joined Xcel Motorsport and Josh Irfan left the series. The team signed Kai Daryanani, who stepped up to GB3 after competing in six different Formula 4 series in 2024 and winning the Formula Trophy UAE driving for Evans GP, and Noah Lisle, who returned to the team he drove for in the 2022 F4 British Championship after spending 2024 driving for Campos Racing in Eurocup-3, where he finished twelfth in the standings.

VRD saw Nikita Johnson switch to Hitech GP, while Shawn Rashid joined Nielsen Racing in Euroformula Open and Noah Ping also left the series. The team signed Red Bull junior Enzo Tarnvanichkul, who contested the opening round of the season as well as rounds five to eight alongside his main Eurocup-3 campaign with Campos Racing. Hugo Schwarze also joined the team for the first five rounds of the year, despite initially only being confirmed for the season opener before a planned move to endurance racing.

Fortec Motorsport also renewed their lineup after Edward Pearson moved to Nielsen Racing in Euroformula Open, Colin Queen joined Ansa Motorsport in Lamborghini Super Trofeo North America and the team's two part-time competitors of 2024 did not return. Fortec signed a single-seater debutant and an F4 graduate in Stefan Bostandjiev, who joined GB3 after competing in the Lamborghini Super Trofeo Europe, and Mika Abrahams, who stepped up from British F4 after contesting a part-time season with Hitech that saw him finish 13th.

None of Chris Dittmann Racing's seven one- or two-race entries of 2024 returned to the team for 2025, while Flynn Jackes moved to Elite Motorsport and Sebastian Murray joined Indy NXT with Andretti Cape Indy NXT. The team entered 2025 without any confirmed full-time entries, as Formula Trophy UAE runner-up Rashid Al Dhaheri was only slated to drive for the team at selected rounds that do not clash with his FRECA commitments and Indian F4 graduate Divy Nandan was initially only confirmed to race for the team for the opening round.

Hillspeed's only full-time driver of 2024, Aditya Kulkarni, left the team and the series. The team entered 2025 with three FRECA drivers coupling their main campaigns with the GB3 events at Silverstone in April and Spa: 2024 Italian F4 champion Freddie Slater, who made his GB3 debut during the penultimate round of 2024 driving for Rodin Motorsport, Kanato Le, who made his GB3 debut for one round in 2024 driving for Chris Dittmann Racing, and Hiyu Yamakoshi, who finished 3rd in the 2024 Italian F4 Championship with Van Amersfoort Racing.

New team Argenti with Prema signed two British F4 graduates in Reza Seewooruthun, who came third driving for Hitech Pulse-Eight, and Mercedes junior Yuanpu Cui, who finished the 2024 season in ninth competing for Argenti's Phinsys-branded outfit. Lucas Fluxá, who graduated from Spanish F4 after finishing eighth with KCL by MP Motorsport in 2024, completed the team's lineup.

New team Xcel Motorsport signed a returnee and a debutant in Patrick Heuzenroeder, who embarked on his second season in the championship after finishing the 2024 season in twelfth driving for JHR Developments, and Jack Sherwood, who graduated from British F4 after coming fifth in 2024 with Rodin Motorsport and made a one-off appearance in the 2023 season for Chris Dittmann Racing. The team's lineup was completed by Dion Gowda, who debuted in GB3 with a part-time campaign comprising the first round at Silverstone as well as the round at Spa alongside his main FRECA campaign.

==== Mid-season ====
Chris Dittmann Racing did not enter cars at the second round, with Divy Nandan electing to move over to JHR Developments. Fortec's Mika Abrahams meanwhile left the championship.

Hitech's Nikita Johnson left the series ahead of the event at the Hungaroring due to conflicting commitments in FIA F3, while Fortec's Stefan Bostandijev also stepped away from GB3 and Divy Nandan also missed round four.

Three US-based drivers made their European racing debuts in round five: Chris Dittmann Racing returned to the series by fielding USF Juniors driver Rodrigo Gonzalez and FR Americas competitor Nicolas Stati, while VRD signed Rodrigo's brother Patricio, who also competed in USF Juniors, for the remainder of the season. Euroformula Open drivers Michael Shin and Yevan David also entered round five, driving for Hillspeed and Xcel Motorsport respectively. The former returned to the series after last racing there in 2023, whereas David debuted in the championship. British F4 driver August Raber made his GB3 debut driving for Argenti with Prema, replacing Yuanpu Cui, who joined Hillspeed.

None of the one-off drivers from round five returned for round six, apart from Rodrigo González, who moved over to join his brother at VRD for the rest of the season. Nikita Johnson meanwhile returned to Hitech after a two-round absence, while Divy Nandan and Yuanpu Cui both ended their campaigns early.

Ahead of the round at Donington Park, Lucas Fluxá announced he would follow Yuanpu Cui in leaving Argenti with Prema to join Hillspeed for the rest of the year. Three drivers made their GB3 debuts in round seven: Formula 4 driver Bart Harrison piloted a third car for JHR Developments, Alpine Academy driver Kabir Anurag joined Xcel Motorsport and USF2000 race winner Liam McNeilly debuted with Fortec Motorsport on the team's return after not fielding any cars after round three. The round at Donington also saw the debut of a new team, with GT racing team Racelab making their single-seater debut by fielding series returnee Max Taylor. Elite Motorsport's William Macintyre announced ahead of the round that he would temporarily step back from motorsport due to a cancer diagnosis.

McNeilly and Taylor departed GB3 after their single-round outings as the final round saw three more debutants and a returnee: Formula 4 drivers Maxim Rehm and Newman Chi joined Hillspeed, while Elite Motorsport promoted GB4 runner-up Isaac Phelps to their GB3 outfit and August Raber returned to Argenti with Prema.

== Race calendar ==
The race calendar was announced on 22 August 2024. The series continued its evolution from a British-focused calendar towards racing all over Europe. It added another event outside the United Kingdom with the championship making its debut at Monza, and dropped Oulton Park from the list of its venues.

Round		Circuit	Date	Supporting	Map of circuit locations
1	R1	(United Kingdom) Silverstone Circuit (Grand Prix Circuit, Northamptonshire)	26 April	British GT Championship	2025 GB3 Championship is located in Northern and Central Europe
1	R2	(United Kingdom) Silverstone Circuit (Grand Prix Circuit, Northamptonshire)	27 April	British GT Championship	2025 GB3 Championship is located in Northern and Central Europe
1	R3	(United Kingdom) Silverstone Circuit (Grand Prix Circuit, Northamptonshire)	27 April	British GT Championship	2025 GB3 Championship is located in Northern and Central Europe
2	R4	Circuit Zandvoort (Zandvoort, Netherlands)	17 May	GT World Challenge Europe	2025 GB3 Championship is located in Northern and Central Europe
2	R5	Circuit Zandvoort (Zandvoort, Netherlands)	18 May	GT World Challenge Europe	2025 GB3 Championship is located in Northern and Central Europe
2	R6	Circuit Zandvoort (Zandvoort, Netherlands)	18 May	GT World Challenge Europe	2025 GB3 Championship is located in Northern and Central Europe
3	R7	Circuit de Spa-Francorchamps (Spa, Belgium)	31 May	Supercar Challenge	2025 GB3 Championship is located in Northern and Central Europe
3	R8	Circuit de Spa-Francorchamps (Spa, Belgium)	31 May	Supercar Challenge	2025 GB3 Championship is located in Northern and Central Europe
3	R9	Circuit de Spa-Francorchamps (Spa, Belgium)	1 June	Supercar Challenge	2025 GB3 Championship is located in Northern and Central Europe
4	R10	Hungaroring (Mogyoród, Hungary)	5 July	International GT Open	2025 GB3 Championship is located in Northern and Central Europe
4	R11	Hungaroring (Mogyoród, Hungary)	6 July	International GT Open	2025 GB3 Championship is located in Northern and Central Europe
4	R12	Hungaroring (Mogyoród, Hungary)	6 July	International GT Open	2025 GB3 Championship is located in Northern and Central Europe
5	R13	(United Kingdom) Silverstone Circuit (Grand Prix Circuit, Northamptonshire)	2 August		2025 GB3 Championship is located in Northern and Central Europe
5	R14	(United Kingdom) Silverstone Circuit (Grand Prix Circuit, Northamptonshire)	3 August		2025 GB3 Championship is located in Northern and Central Europe
5	R15	(United Kingdom) Silverstone Circuit (Grand Prix Circuit, Northamptonshire)	3 August		2025 GB3 Championship is located in Northern and Central Europe
6	R16	(United Kingdom) Brands Hatch (Grand Prix Circuit, Kent)	23 August	British GT Championship	2025 GB3 Championship is located in Northern and Central Europe
6	R17	(United Kingdom) Brands Hatch (Grand Prix Circuit, Kent)	24 August	British GT Championship	2025 GB3 Championship is located in Northern and Central Europe
6	R18	(United Kingdom) Brands Hatch (Grand Prix Circuit, Kent)	24 August	British GT Championship	2025 GB3 Championship is located in Northern and Central Europe
7	R19	(United Kingdom) Donington Park (Grand Prix Circuit, Leicestershire)	4 October	British GT Championship	2025 GB3 Championship is located in Northern and Central Europe
7	R20	(United Kingdom) Donington Park (Grand Prix Circuit, Leicestershire)	5 October	British GT Championship	2025 GB3 Championship is located in Northern and Central Europe
7	R21	(United Kingdom) Donington Park (Grand Prix Circuit, Leicestershire)	5 October	British GT Championship	2025 GB3 Championship is located in Northern and Central Europe
8	R22	Monza Circuit (Monza, Italy)	18 October	International GT Open	2025 GB3 Championship is located in Northern and Central Europe
8	R23	Monza Circuit (Monza, Italy)	19 October	International GT Open	2025 GB3 Championship is located in Northern and Central Europe
8	R24	Monza Circuit (Monza, Italy)	19 October	International GT Open	2025 GB3 Championship is located in Northern and Central Europe

== Race results ==
Round		Circuit	Pole position	Fastest lap	Winning driver	Winning team
1	R1	(United Kingdom) Silverstone Circuit	(United Kingdom) Freddie Slater	(United Kingdom) Freddie Slater	(United Kingdom) Freddie Slater	(United Kingdom) Hillspeed
1	R2	(United Kingdom) Silverstone Circuit	(United Kingdom) Freddie Slater	(United Kingdom) Freddie Slater	(United Kingdom) Freddie Slater	(United Kingdom) Hillspeed
1	R3	(United Kingdom) Silverstone Circuit		(United Kingdom) William Macintyre	(United Kingdom) William Macintyre	(United Kingdom) Elite Motorsport
2	R4	(Netherlands) Circuit Zandvoort	(Australia) Patrick Heuzenroeder	(Australia) Patrick Heuzenroeder	(Australia) Patrick Heuzenroeder	(United Arab Emirates) Xcel Motorsport
2	R5	(Netherlands) Circuit Zandvoort	(Australia) Alex Ninovic	(Australia) Patrick Heuzenroeder	(Australia) Alex Ninovic	(New Zealand) Rodin Motorsport
2	R6	(Netherlands) Circuit Zandvoort		(Germany) Hugo Schwarze	(Germany) Hugo Schwarze	(United States) VRD Racing
3	R7	(Belgium) Circuit de Spa-Francorchamps	(Australia) Alex Ninovic	(United Kingdom) Freddie Slater	(Australia) Alex Ninovic	(New Zealand) Rodin Motorsport
3	R8	(Belgium) Circuit de Spa-Francorchamps	(Japan) Kanato Le	(United Kingdom) Freddie Slater	(Japan) Kanato Le	(United Kingdom) Hillspeed
3	R9	(Belgium) Circuit de Spa-Francorchamps		(Australia) Patrick Heuzenroeder	(United Kingdom) Freddie Slater	(United Kingdom) Hillspeed
4	R10	(Hungary) Hungaroring	(United Arab Emirates) Keanu Al Azhari	(Australia) Gianmarco Pradel	(Australia) Gianmarco Pradel	(New Zealand) Rodin Motorsport
4	R11	(Hungary) Hungaroring	(Australia) Alex Ninovic	(Australia) Alex Ninovic	(Australia) Alex Ninovic	(New Zealand) Rodin Motorsport
4	R12	(Hungary) Hungaroring		(United Kingdom) Reza Seewooruthun	(United Kingdom) Reza Seewooruthun	(United Kingdom) Argenti with Prema
5	R13	(United Kingdom) Silverstone Circuit	(Australia) Alex Ninovic	(Australia) Alex Ninovic	(Australia) Alex Ninovic	(New Zealand) Rodin Motorsport
5	R14	(United Kingdom) Silverstone Circuit	(Australia) Alex Ninovic	(Australia) Alex Ninovic	(United Arab Emirates) Keanu Al Azhari	(United Kingdom) Hitech TGR
5	R15	(United Kingdom) Silverstone Circuit		(United Kingdom) Reza Seewooruthun	(Australia) Gianmarco Pradel	(New Zealand) Rodin Motorsport
6	R16	(United Kingdom) Brands Hatch	(Australia) Alex Ninovic	(Australia) Alex Ninovic	(Australia) Alex Ninovic	(New Zealand) Rodin Motorsport
6	R17	(United Kingdom) Brands Hatch	(Australia) Alex Ninovic	(Australia) Alex Ninovic	(Australia) Alex Ninovic	(New Zealand) Rodin Motorsport
6	R18	(United Kingdom) Brands Hatch		(Australia) Gianmarco Pradel	(Thailand) Enzo Tarnvanichkul	(United States) VRD Racing
7	R19	(United Kingdom) Donington Park	(Australia) Alex Ninovic	(Australia) Alex Ninovic	(Australia) Alex Ninovic	(New Zealand) Rodin Motorsport
7	R20	(United Kingdom) Donington Park	(United Kingdom) Reza Seewooruthun	(Australia) Alex Ninovic	(Australia) Alex Ninovic	(New Zealand) Rodin Motorsport
7	R21	(United Kingdom) Donington Park		(United Kingdom) Bart Harrison	(Spain) Lucas Fluxá	(United Kingdom) Hillspeed
8	R22	(Italy) Monza Circuit	(Australia) Alex Ninovic	(Australia) Alex Ninovic	(Australia) Alex Ninovic	(New Zealand) Rodin Motorsport
8	R23	(Italy) Monza Circuit	(Australia) Alex Ninovic	(Australia) Alex Ninovic	(United Kingdom) Deagen Fairclough	(United Kingdom) Hitech TGR
8	R24	(Italy) Monza Circuit		(Australia) Alex Ninovic	(Germany) Maxim Rehm	(United Kingdom) Hillspeed

== Season report ==
=== First half ===
The 2025 GB3 Championship began at Silverstone with a qualifying session dominated by Hillspeed's Freddie Slater, who claimed both pole positions by over fourth tenths of a second and set a new GB3 lap record in session two. He converted pole position into a commanding lights-to-flag victory in race one, pulling clear of JHR's Noah Lisle, who took second at the start of the race, and Rodin's Gianmarco Pradel, who completed the podium in third. Race two brought much of the same, with Slater unchallenged again. He mastered an early safety car restart ahead of Lisle and built a nine-second gap before a second interruption saw the race finish under caution. Lisle repeated his second place, with Hitech TGR's Nikita Johnson third. The reversed-grid finale went to Elite Motorsport’s William Macintyre, who led from the first lap and finished ahead of Xcel Motorsport's Patrick Heuzenroeder and JHR's Kai Daryanani after a race punctuated by multiple incidents. Slater left the first round with a 15-point championship lead over Lisle.

Heuzenroeder and Rodin's Alex Ninovic claimed their first GB3 pole positions in qualifying at Zandvoort, with Heuzenroeder topping the opening session and Ninovic fastest in the second. Race one began with an aborted start, but when it got underway, polesitter Heuzenroeder controlled proceedings, claiming a maiden win both for him and his team, ahead of Hitech TGR's Deagen Fairclough and Pradel. Ninovic also took his maiden win a race later, with Heuzenroeder second after front-row starter Fairclough had a bad start, fell to fourth behind Argenti with Prema's Reza Seewooruthun and recovered to third. VRD Racing's Hugo Schwarze made it three maiden winners out of three races in the reversed-grid final by starting fourth, climbing to the lead within the first two laps and controlling two safety car restarts. Macintyre and Hitech TGR's Keanu Al Azhari completed the podium. With championship leader Slater on a part-time schedule and not present at round two, Heuzenroeder claimed the championship lead, 14 points ahead of Ninovic.

Qualifying at Spa-Francorchamps was disrupted by red flags. Ninovic and Hillspeed's Kanato Le claimed a pole position each as championship contenders Slater and Fairclough both failed to set times after separate incidents, consigning them to the back for all three races. Ninovic converted his race one pole into a controlled lights-to-flag victory, surviving two safety car periods to finish ahead of Schwarze and Le. Slater climbed from last to tenth after an early charge through the field. Le made amends in race two, recovering from a slow start that dropped him to fourth at the start to take his maiden win ahead of Johnson and Ninovic, with Al Azhari and Hillspeed's Hiyu Yamakoshi rounding out the top five. The reversed-grid finale was run on a drying track, and Slater started on slick tyres to produce a remarkable charge: he started in 23rd and claimed the lead by lap six to lead Le and Seewooruthun home. Ninovic retired late on, but still ended the weekend as the new championship leader, eight points ahead of Heuzenroeder.

Al Azhari and Ninovic were fastest in qualifying at the Hungaroring, with Al Azhari securing his maiden pole position for race one before Ninovic edged him by 0.024 seconds in Q2 to claim his third of the season. Pradel took his first GB3 victory in the opening race, jumping Al Azhari off the line and leading throughout despite a mid-race safety car caused by a retirement for Elite's Flynn Jackes. Macintyre finished second ahead of Al Azhari. Ninovic responded in race two by converting pole into a lights-to-flag win, surviving an early safety car triggered by a collision between Xcel's Jack Sherwood and Daryanani to finish 1.8 seconds clear of Al Azhari, while Pradel took third ahead of Lisle and Macintyre. The reversed-grid finale was dominated by Seewooruthun, who surged from third to the lead at turn two and took his and his team's maiden win by over 16 seconds ahead of Daryanani and Schwarze. A win and two top-ten finishes in the three races saw Ninovic bolster his championship lead to 34 points at the halfway point of the season.

=== Second half ===
Ninovic topped both qualifying sessions on GB3's return to Silverstone, leading Seewooruthun and Fairclough on the respective front rows. He opened race one by converting his pole position into a comfortable victory after a second formation lap shortened the distance, extending his lead as Pradel moved past Fairclough and later won a multi-car fight for second ahead of the recovering Al Azhari. Race two was interrupted early by a safety car following a retirement for Rodin's Abbi Pulling, and the lead changed several times between Ninovic and Fairclough before they collided at Brooklands, eliminating both from contention. Al Azhari, having twice passed Heuzenroeder, assumed the lead and claimed his maiden win from Heuzenroeder and Hilspeed's returnee Michael Shin. Pradel then led every lap of the reversed-grid finale from pole, holding off Sherwood before Seewooruthun advanced to second and Lisle completed the podium. Ninovic climbed to fourth after starting eleventh to slightly extend his championship lead to 39 points.

Qualifying for round six at Brands Hatch saw Ninovic continue his one-lap dominance as he claimed another two pole positions, both ahead of Slater. In race one, Ninovic held the lead from the start while Slater recovered from a poor launch to reclaim second with a move around Fairclough and Heuzenroeder at Druids. Ninovic extended his margin to four seconds before a safety car was triggered by Sherwood’s off at Stirling’s, then controlled the three-lap restart to win ahead of Slater and Fairclough. Race two began after a long delay; Ninovic again kept Slater at bay before an opening-lap collision eliminated Al Azhari. After the restart on lap five, Ninovic gradually pulled clear to win by two seconds, with Slater and Fairclough repeating their podium positions. The reversed-grid finale went to VRD's Enzo Tarnvanichkul, who led Jack Sherwood before a safety car finish secured his maiden win. Pulling took third as non-scores for Pradel, Fairclough and Heuzenroeder coupled with Ninovic's two wins saw his championship lead grow sharply to 71 points.

The penultimate round at Donington Park saw Ninovic and Seewooruthun share pole positions and front rows in qualifying. Ninovic started race one leading into Redgate and extended his margin before a safety car when Fortec's debutant Liam McNeilly spun into the gravel trap. Ninovic rebuilt his advantage after the restart while Lisle and Fairclough exchanged third. Lisle eventually prevailed, and a later incident for Al Azhari brought a second safety car that ended the race under neutralisation. Race two began with Ninovic jumping the start, earning a ten-second penalty, but he pulled clear either side of a brief safety car and stretched his margin sufficiently to retain victory once the penalty was applied, with Seewooruthun second and Fairclough third. Hillspeed's Lucas Fluxá led throughout the reversed-grid finale as an opening-lap collision caused a lengthy caution. Fluxa stayed ahead to beat JHR's Bart Harrison and McNeilly, while Ninovic rose to seventh to seal the championship title by moving 113 points clear of Heuzenroeder.

GB3 debuted at Monza for its season finale, and champion Ninovic claimed another two pole positions. In race one, he retained the lead at the restart after an opening-lap red flag triggered by multiple incidents. A brief safety car followed a spin for Elite's Bianca Bustamante, and Ninovic headed a six-car train thereafter before edging clear on the final lap to defeat Heuzenroeder and Pradel. Race two began with after contact that forced Ninovic, Lisle and Fairclough to miss the first chicane and reshuffled the order. Further collisions eliminated eight drivers as Fairclough was able to claim the lead from Ninovic throughout successive restarts. He stayed ahead to take victory in front of Ninovic and Pradel. Hillspeed's debutant Maxim Rehm prevailed in the reversed-grid finale after passing Tarnvanichkul early on and resisting Fairclough and Pradel in a long slipstream train, sealing his first victory. Heuzenroeder recovered to sixth to secure second in the standings, while Ninovic rose from 19th to seventh to conclude the season on 524 points.

Across the season, Ninovic established clear superiority both in one-lap and race pace, taking nine wins, ten pole positions and two additional podiums to secure the title by 148 points, the largest margin in several years. Thirteen different drivers won races, among them a dominant double win for Slater in the opening Silverstone round, while further maiden victories for Le, Al Azhari, Tarnvanichkul, Fluxá and Rehm underlined the depth of the field. Frequent reversed-grid unpredictability and changing weather at Spa produced several standout recoveries, and incidents at Zandvoort, Silverstone and Monza contributed to a high number of safety-car-affected races. Despite this variability, Ninovic’s run of front-row starts and controlled race-management proved decisive, ensuring that no full-season rival - Heuzenroeder, Pradel or Fairclough among them - could mount a sustained challenge as the championship was settled with a round to spare.

== Championship standings ==
Scoring system

Points were awarded to the top 20 classified finishers in races one and two, with the third race awarding points to only the top 15. Race three, which had its grid formed by reversing the top twelve from the qualifying order, awarded extra points, up until a maximum of twelve, for positions gained from the drivers' respective starting positions.

Races	Position, points per race																			
Races	1st	2nd	3rd	4th	5th	6th	7th	8th	9th	10th	11th	12th	13th	14th	15th	16th	17th	18th	19th	20th
Races 1 & 2	35	29	24	21	19	17	15	13	12	11	10	9	8	7	6	5	4	3	2	1
Race 3	20	17	15	13	11	10	9	8	7	6	5	4	3	2	1					

=== Drivers' championship ===
Pos	Driver	SIL1 (United Kingdom)			ZAN (Netherlands)			SPA (Belgium)			HUN (Hungary)			SIL2 (United Kingdom)			BRH (United Kingdom)			DON (United Kingdom)			MNZ (Italy)			Pts
Pos	Driver	R1	R2	R3	R4	R5	R6	R7	R8	R9	R10	R11	R12	R13	R14	R15	R16	R17	R18	R19	R20	R21	R22	R23	R24	Pts
1	(Australia) Alex Ninovic	4	5	Ret	4	**1**	9^{3}	**1**	3	Ret	4	**1**	8^{4}	**1**	**21**	4^{7}	**1**	**1**	12	**1**	1	7^{5}	**1**	**2**	7^{5}	524
2	(Australia) Patrick Heuzenroeder	11	7	2^{2}	**1**	2	7^{3}	7	12	4	5	8	6	6	2	12	4	4	Ret	4	4	Ret	2	Ret	6^{4}	376
3	(United Kingdom) Deagen Fairclough	17	22	7^{12}	2	3	4^{7}	19	11	5^{12}	6	6	5^{3}	4	20	Ret	3	3	18	6	3	15	4	1	2^{7}	373
4	(Australia) Gianmarco Pradel	3	4	Ret	3	7	Ret	6	7	16	1	3	10	2	9	1	7	5	17	8	10	Ret	3	3	3^{1}	364
5	(United Kingdom) Reza Seewooruthun	15	11	14^{3}	5	4	8^{1}	11	16	3^{12}	7	10	1^{2}	Ret	4	2^{4}	13	15	8^{6}	2	**2**	Ret	7	Ret	5	315
6	(United Arab Emirates) Keanu Al Azhari	7	Ret	6	8	10	3	15	4	12	**3**	2	7^{4}	3	1	Ret	12	Ret	11^{4}	Ret	7	5	12	4	11^{11}	310
7	(Australia) Noah Lisle	2	2	Ret	7	8	5^{1}	4	14	14	8	4	11	Ret	5	3^{2}	10	10	13	3	DNS	6^{5}	10	Ret	9^{2}	287
8	(Spain) Lucas Fluxá	14	8	5^{9}	12	12	12^{2}	12	18	8^{11}	11	11	12^{2}	10	Ret	13^{9}	16	13	9^{7}	5	5	1	8	13	8	258
9	(United Kingdom) William Macintyre	8	23	1^{1}	10	9	2	5	6	10	2	5	15	5	6	9^{3}	5	11	Ret							240
10	(United Kingdom) Abbi Pulling	5	6	Ret	13	13	11^{2}	16	17	17	10	9	9	12	Ret	7^{6}	8	9	3^{1}	7	12	Ret	9	5	4	231
11	(India) Kai Daryanani	9	15	3	9	14	Ret	8	10	13	9	Ret	2	9	7	6	9	7	5^{1}	15	19	11	Ret	6	14^{3}	219
12	(United Kingdom) Freddie Slater	**1**	**1**	13				9	8	1^{12}							2	2	6^{5}							203
13	(United Kingdom) Jack Sherwood	18	21	9^{9}	15	16	10^{9}	Ret	19	7^{9}	13	Ret	14^{2}	16	14	5	NC	12	2	11	8	4^{1}	11	7	12^{3}	193
14	(Japan) Kanato Le	13	9	8^{5}				3	**1**	2^{10}							17	8	7							145
15	(Germany) Hugo Schwarze	16	13	15^{1}	11	11	1^{3}	2	13	9	Ret	7	3^{1}	14	Ret	14^{1}										143
16	(United States) Nikita Johnson	6	3	11	19	5	6^{2}	Ret	2	11							14	18	10^{9}							138
17	(Thailand) Enzo Tarnvanichkul	19	14	12^{7}										8	11	8	11	14	1^{1}	9	11	9	18	Ret	19	122
18	(China) Yuanpu Cui	20	12	10^{5}	6	6	Ret	13	15	15	12	12	16†	7	8	11										122
19	(Japan) Hiyu Yamakoshi	12	10	4^{8}				10	5	19							6	6	4^{3}							121
20	(Philippines) Flynn Jackes	21	19	17^{6}	16	18	Ret	18	22	20	Ret	14	4	18	13	15^{2}	15	16	14^{3}	14	17	Ret	16	12	20	94
21	(Mexico) Patricio González													Ret	12	16^{3}	19	17	16^{4}	12	6	10^{5}	14	9	15	79
22	(Philippines) Bianca Bustamante	DNS	20	19^{2}	17	19	13^{3}	20	20	Ret	14	13	13^{2}	15	17	18^{2}	Ret	19	19^{2}	18	18	14^{3}	17	14	22	75
23	(Mexico) Rodrigo González													20	18	21^{3}	18	Ret	15^{3}	16	16	12^{2}	Ret	10	21	41
24	(South Korea) Michael Shin													11	3	10										40
25	(India) Dion Gowda	10	Ret	Ret				14	9	6																40
26	(United States) Max Taylor																			10	9	8^{8}				39
27	(Singapore) Kabir Anurag																			17	14	13	13	8	13	38
28	(United Kingdom) Bart Harrison																			13	15	2^{1}	Ret	Ret	18^{2}	34
29	(India) Divy Nandan	24	17	18^{6}	18	17	14^{4}	Ret	21	18^{3}				19	16	22										33
30	(Sweden) August Raber													13	15	17^{4}							15	Ret	17	24
31	(United Kingdom) Liam McNeilly																			Ret	13	3				23
32	(Bulgaria) Stefan Bostandjiev	23	18	Ret	14	15	Ret	17	23	21																20
33	(Sri Lanka) Yevan David													17	10	19										15
34	(South Africa) Mika Abrahams	22	16	16^{4}																						9
35	(Australia) Nicolas Stati													21	19	20^{3}										5
Guest drivers ineligible to score points
—	(Germany) Maxim Rehm																						6	Ret	1	0
—	(China) Newman Chi																						5	Ret	10	0
—	(United Kingdom) Isaac Phelps																						Ret	11	16	0
Pos	Driver	R1	R2	R3	R4	R5	R6	R7	R8	R9	R10	R11	R12	R13	R14	R15	R16	R17	R18	R19	R20	R21	R22	R23	R24	Pts
Pos	Driver	SIL1 (United Kingdom)			ZAN (Netherlands)			SPA (Belgium)			HUN (Hungary)			SIL2 (United Kingdom)			BRH (United Kingdom)			DON (United Kingdom)			MNZ (Italy)			Pts

Colour	Result
Gold	Winner
Silver	Second place
Bronze	Third place
Green	Points classification
Blue	Non-points classification
Blue	Non-classified finish (NC)
Purple	Retired, not classified (Ret)
Red	Did not qualify (DNQ)
Red	Did not pre-qualify (DNPQ)
Black	Disqualified (DSQ)
White	Did not start (DNS)
White	Withdrew (WD)
White	Race cancelled (C)
Blank	Did not practice (DNP)
Blank	Did not arrive (DNA)
Blank	Excluded (EX)

**Bold** – Pole

Italics – Fastest Lap

^{1} ^{2 ... 12} – points earned for positions
gained during Race 3.

=== Teams' championship ===
Each team counted its two best results of every race.

Pos	Driver	SIL1 (United Kingdom)			ZAN (Netherlands)			SPA (Belgium)			HUN (Hungary)			SIL2 (United Kingdom)			BRH (United Kingdom)			DON (United Kingdom)			MNZ (Italy)			Pts
Pos	Driver	R1	R2	R3	R4	R5	R6	R7	R8	R9	R10	R11	R12	R13	R14	R15	R16	R17	R18	R19	R20	R21	R22	R23	R24	Pts
1	(New Zealand) Rodin Motorsport	3	4	Ret	3	1	9^{3}	1	3	16	1	1	8^{4}	1	9	1	1	1	3^{1}	1	1	7^{5}	1	2	3^{1}	914
1	(New Zealand) Rodin Motorsport	4	5	Ret	4	7	11^{2}	6	7	17	4	3	9	2	21	4^{7}	7	5	12	7	10	Ret	3	3	7^{5}	914
2	(United Kingdom) Hitech TGR	6	3	6	2	3	3	15	2	5^{12}	3	2	5^{3}	3	1	Ret	3	3	10^{9}	6	3	5	4	1	2^{7}	766
2	(United Kingdom) Hitech TGR	7	22	7^{12}	8	5	4^{7}	19	4	11	6	6	7^{4}	4	20	Ret	12	18	11^{4}	Ret	7	15	12	4	11^{11}	766
3	(United Arab Emirates) Xcel Motorsport	10	7	2^{2}	1	2	7^{3}	7	9	4	5	8	6	6	2	5	4	4	2	4	4	4^{1}	2	7	6^{4}	616
3	(United Arab Emirates) Xcel Motorsport	11	21	9^{9}	15	16	10^{9}	14	12	7^{9}	13	Ret	14^{2}	16	10	12	NC	12	Ret	11	8	13	11	8	12^{3}	616
4	(United Kingdom) Hillspeed	1	1	4^{8}				3	1	1^{12}				7	3	10	2	2	4^{3}	5	5	1	8	13	8	557
4	(United Kingdom) Hillspeed	12	9	8^{5}				9	5	2^{10}				11	8	11	6	6	6^{5}				6	Ret	1	557
5	(United Kingdom) JHR Developments	2	2	3	7	8	5^{1}	4	10	13	8	4	2	9	5	3^{2}	9	7	5^{1}	3	15	2^{1}	10	6	9^{2}	536
5	(United Kingdom) JHR Developments	9	15	Ret	9	14	14^{4}	8	14	18^{3}	9	Ret	11	19	7	6	10	10	13	13	19	6^{5}	Ret	Ret	14^{3}	536
6	(United Kingdom) Argenti with Prema	14	8	5^{9}	5	4	8^{1}	11	15	3^{12}	7	10	1^{2}	10	4	2^{4}	13	13	8^{6}	2	2	Ret	7	Ret	5	531
6	(United Kingdom) Argenti with Prema	15	11	10^{5}	6	6	12^{2}	12	16	8^{11}	11	11	12^{2}	13	15	13^{9}	16	15	9^{7}				15	Ret	17	531
7	(United Kingdom) Elite Motorsport	8	19	1^{1}	10	12	2	5	6	10	2	5	4	5	6	9^{3}	5	11	14^{3}	14	17	14^{3}	16	16	16	381
7	(United Kingdom) Elite Motorsport	21	20	17^{6}	16	18	13^{3}	18	20	20	14	13	13^{2}	15	13	15^{2}	15	16	19^{2}	18	18	Ret	17	17	20	381
8	(United States) VRD Racing	16	13	12^{7}	11	11	1^{3}	2	13	9	Ret	7	3^{1}	8	11	8	11	14	1^{1}	9	6	9	14	9	15	353
8	(United States) VRD Racing	19	14	15^{1}										14	12	14^{1}	18	17	15^{3}	12	11	10^{5}	18	10	19	353
9	(United Kingdom) Fortec Motorsport	22	16	16^{4}	14	15	Ret	17	23	21										Ret	13	3				52
9	(United Kingdom) Fortec Motorsport	23	18	Ret																						52
10	(United Kingdom) Racelab																			10	9	8^{8}				39
11	(United Kingdom) Chris Dittmann Racing	24	17	18^{6}										20	18	20^{3}										22
11	(United Kingdom) Chris Dittmann Racing													21	19	21^{3}										22
Pos	Driver	R1	R2	R3	R4	R5	R6	R7	R8	R9	R10	R11	R12	R13	R14	R15	R16	R17	R18	R19	R20	R21	R22	R23	R24	Pts
Pos	Driver	SIL1 (United Kingdom)			ZAN (Netherlands)			SPA (Belgium)			HUN (Hungary)			SIL2 (United Kingdom)			BRH (United Kingdom)			DON (United Kingdom)			MNZ (Italy)			Pts
