= 2026–27 GR86 Championship New Zealand =

Motor racing competition

The 2026–27 GR86 Championship New Zealand (known for commercial reasons as the 2026–27 Bridgestone GR86 Championship New Zealand) is the fourteenth running of the one-make sports car racing series.

The championship is to be held in New Zealand over six weekends, starting at Taupo International Motorsport Park on 14 November 2026, and will conclude on 21 February 2027 at Hampton Downs Motorsport Park. Additionally, the series will run a non-championship round as part of the Taupō Supercars round support package.

== Calendar ==
The following circuits are due to host a round of the 2026-27 championship.

Round	Circuit	Date	Supporting	Map of circuit locations
2026				2026–27 GR86 Championship New Zealand is located in New Zealand
1	Taupo International Motorsport Park (Taupō, Waikato)	13–15 November	TA2 NZ Championship	2026–27 GR86 Championship New Zealand is located in New Zealand
2027				2026–27 GR86 Championship New Zealand is located in New Zealand
2	Hampton Downs Motorsport Park (Hampton Downs, North Waikato)	9–10 January	Formula Regional Oceania Trophy	2026–27 GR86 Championship New Zealand is located in New Zealand
3	Teretonga Park (Invercargill, Southland)	22–24 January	Formula Regional Oceania Trophy; TA2 NZ Championship	2026–27 GR86 Championship New Zealand is located in New Zealand
4	Highlands Motorsport Park (Cromwell, Southland)	29–31 January	New Zealand Grand Prix; Formula Regional Oceania Trophy; TA2 NZ Championship	2026–27 GR86 Championship New Zealand is located in New Zealand
5	Hampton Downs Motorsport Park (Hampton Downs, North Waikato)	19–21 February	TA2 NZ Championship	2026–27 GR86 Championship New Zealand is located in New Zealand
NC	Taupo International Motorsport Park (Taupō, Waikato)	14–16 May	Supercars Championship; TA2 NZ Championship	2026–27 GR86 Championship New Zealand is located in New Zealand

== Teams and drivers ==
All drivers compete with identical Toyota GR86 cars on the Bridgestone Potenza RE-71RS tyres.

Team	No.	Driver	Status	Rounds
MacKenzie Motorsport	10	(New Zealand) Ajay Giddy		1
MacKenzie Motorsport	15	(New Zealand) Nathan Grammer	R	1
MacKenzie Motorsport	43	(New Zealand) Cameron Hill		1
MacKenzie Motorsport	73	(New Zealand) Harry Townshend		1
MacKenzie Motorsport	861	(New Zealand) Nieko Scoles	R	1
MacKenzie Motorsport	888	(New Zealand) Miles Baker	R	1
James Marshall Motorsport	18	(Australia) Mathew Basso	R	1
REB Motorsport	19	(New Zealand) Riley Boswell	R	1
iMac Race Engineering	25	(New Zealand) Lucas McGill		1
MR – Skunkworks Racing	37	(New Zealand) Taylor Mitchell	R	1
Action Motorsport	67	(New Zealand) Marcel Bartley	R	1
Action Motorsport	777	(Australia) Romeo Nasr		1
Neale Motorsport	92	(New Zealand) Mac Templeton		1
Syndicate Motorsport	95	(New Zealand) Blake Dowdall		1
Syndicate Motorsport	99	(New Zealand) Justin Allen		1

== Results and standings ==
=== Season summary ===
Rnd		Circuit	Pole position	Fastest lap	Winning driver	Winning team	Winning rookie
1	R1	Taupo International Motorsport Park (Taupō, Waikato)	(New Zealand) Ajay Giddy	(New Zealand) Ajay Giddy	(New Zealand) Ajay Giddy	MacKenzie Motorsport	(New Zealand) Miles Baker
1	R2	Taupo International Motorsport Park (Taupō, Waikato)		(New Zealand) Nieko Scoles	(New Zealand) Nieko Scoles	MacKenzie Motorsport	(New Zealand) Nieko Scoles
1	R3	Taupo International Motorsport Park (Taupō, Waikato)	(New Zealand) Ajay Giddy	(New Zealand) Ajay Giddy	(New Zealand) Ajay Giddy	MacKenzie Motorsport	(New Zealand) Nieko Scoles
2	R1	Hampton Downs Motorsport Park (Hampton Downs, North Waikato)					
2	R2	Hampton Downs Motorsport Park (Hampton Downs, North Waikato)					
2	R3	Hampton Downs Motorsport Park (Hampton Downs, North Waikato)					
3	R1	Teretonga Park (Invercargill, Southland)					
3	R2	Teretonga Park (Invercargill, Southland)					
3	R3	Teretonga Park (Invercargill, Southland)					
4	R1	Highlands Motorsport Park (Cromwell, Southland)					
4	R2	Highlands Motorsport Park (Cromwell, Southland)					
4	R3	Highlands Motorsport Park (Cromwell, Southland)					
5	R1	Hampton Downs Motorsport Park (Hampton Downs, North Waikato)					
5	R2	Hampton Downs Motorsport Park (Hampton Downs, North Waikato)					
5	R3	Hampton Downs Motorsport Park (Hampton Downs, North Waikato)					
NC	R1	Taupo International Motorsport Park (Taupō, Waikato)					
NC	R2	Taupo International Motorsport Park (Taupō, Waikato)					
NC	R3	Taupo International Motorsport Park (Taupō, Waikato)					

=== Championship standings ===
Pos.	Driver	TAU1			HAM1			TER			HIG			HAM2			TAU2			Points
Pos.	Driver	R1	R2	R3	R1	R2	R3	R1	R2	R3	R1	R2	R3	R1	R2	R3	R1	R2	R3	Points
1	(New Zealand) Ajay Giddy	1	4	1																204
2	(New Zealand) Cameron Hill	6	2	3																172
3	(New Zealand) Harry Townshend	3	6	2																172
4	(New Zealand) Nieko Scoles	8	1	4																168
5	(Australia) Romeo Nasr	5	5	5																147
6	(New Zealand) Mac Templeton	7	3	8																141
7	(New Zealand) Miles Baker	4	7	11																126
8	(New Zealand) Justin Allen	9	11	6																111
9	(New Zealand) Taylor Mitchell	10	8	9																108
10	(New Zealand) Nathan Grammer	11	9	10																99
11	(New Zealand) Blake Dowdall	15	10	7																97
12	(New Zealand) Riley Boswell	12	12	14																80
13	(New Zealand) Marcel Bartley	13	14	12																78
14	(Australia) Mathew Basso	14	13	13																76
15	(New Zealand) Lucas McGill	2	Ret	Ret																67
Pos.	Driver	R1	R2	R3	R1	R2	R3	R1	R2	R3	R1	R2	R3	R1	R2	R3	R1	R2	R3	Points
Pos.	Driver	TAU1			HAM1			TER			HIG			HAM2			TAU2			Points
