= Hugo Schwarze =

German racing driver (born 2006)

- Schwarze at Silverstone Circuit in 2026
- Nationality: (Germany) German
- Born: 3 July 2006 (age 20) Köln, Nordrhein-Westfalen, Germany

European Le Mans Series career
- Debut season: 2026
- Current team: R-ace GP
- Categorisation: FIA Silver
- Car number: 85
- Starts: 5 (5 entries)
- Wins: 1
- Podiums: 3
- Poles: 2
- Fastest laps: 1

Hugo Schwarze (born 3 July 2006) is a German racing driver competing in the LMP3 class of the European Le Mans Series for R-ace GP. He is the 2025 Le Mans Cup champion, and a GB3 Championship race winner.

== Early career ==
=== Karting ===
Schwarze only started karting in 2022. He competed in the German and European Championship Rotax Max Challenge, and in 2023 he won Rotax Max Challenge Germany Wintercup in the DD2 category.

=== Ginetta Junior Championship ===
In 2023, it was confirmed that Schwarze would be driving for Elite Motorsport in Ginetta Juniors. He had a very strong debut in cars, picking up three out of three podiums in his first weekend. He then went on to pick up his first win at Donington Park. Schwarze went on to accumulate two wins and 11 podiums over the course of the season, which was enough to crown him vice-champion.

=== GB3 Championship ===
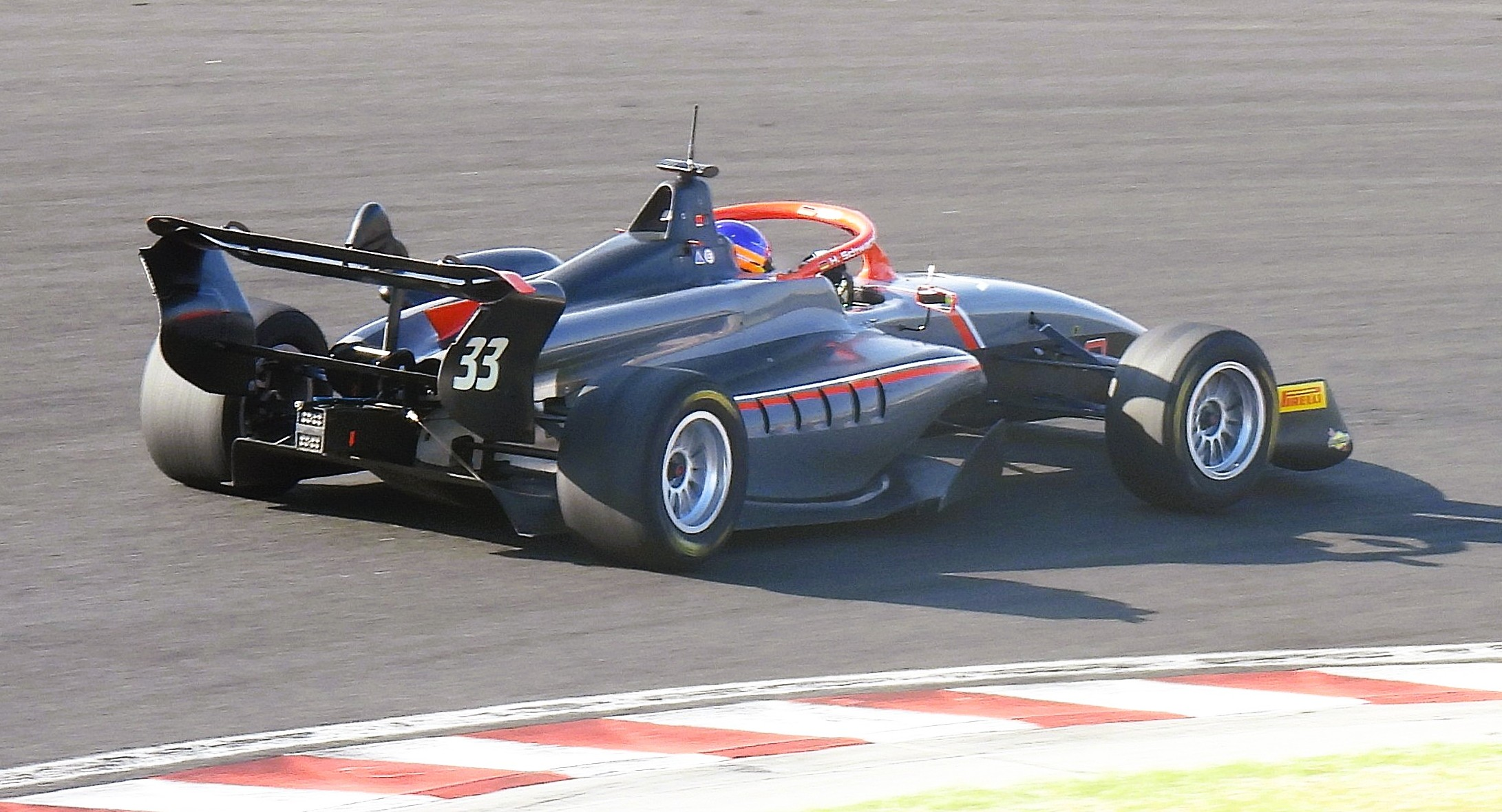
Hugo Schwarze heading for third place at the Hungaroring during the 2025 GB3 Championship season.

On 25 January 2024, Elite Motorsport confirmed that they would be promoting Schwarze to its GB3 team, partnering McKenzy Cresswell and Jarrod Waberski. Schwarze did not amass any podiums in his maiden campaign, but was consistent throughout the season, ending ninth in the drivers' championship with 219 points.

==== 2025 ====
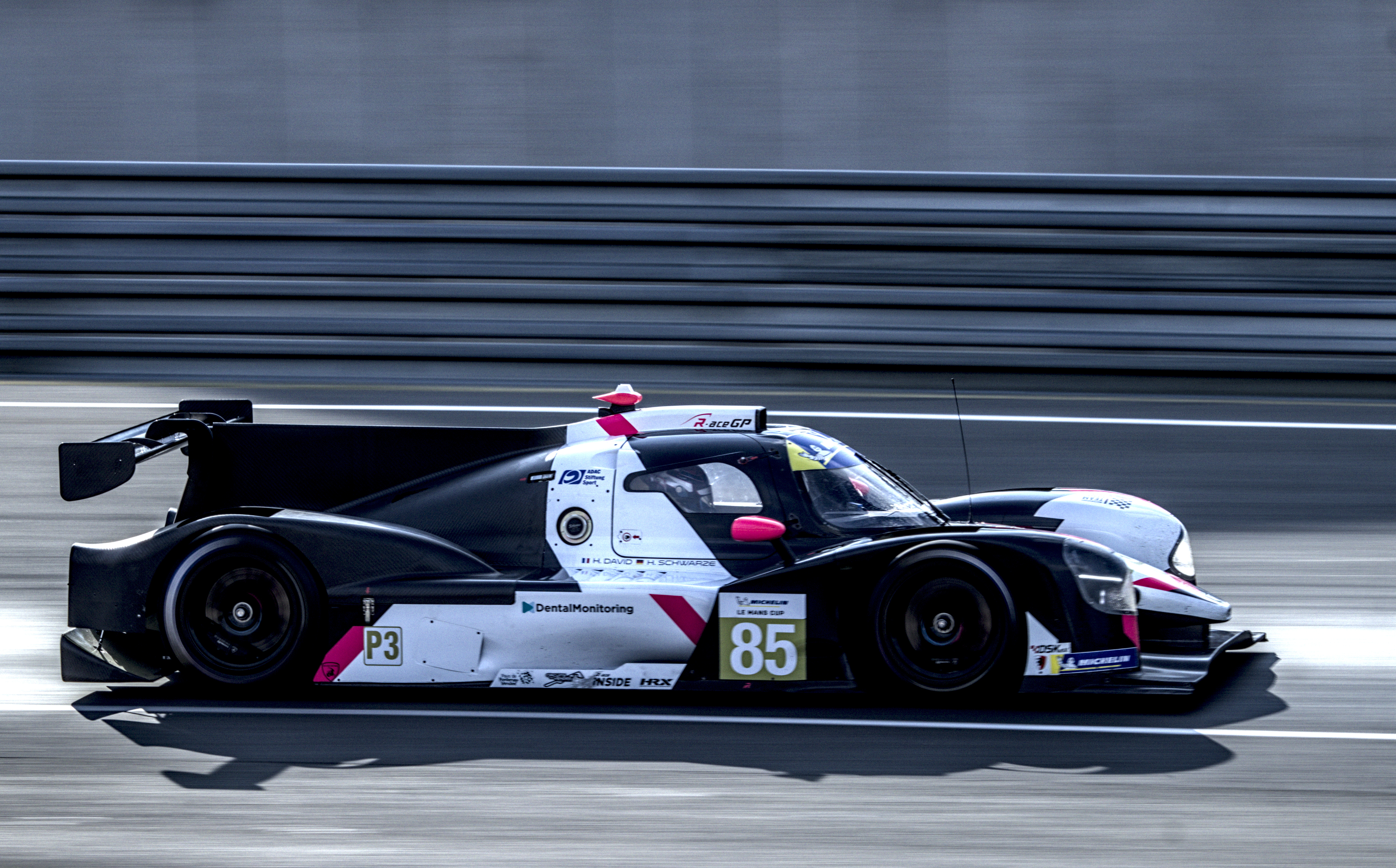
Schwarze on his way to 2nd at the 2025 Road to Le Mans.

Schwarze began the 2025 season in the GB3 Championship with VRD Racing. He scored three podium finishes, including a victory at Zandvoort.

Schwarze also made his prototype debut in the Le Mans Cup in the LMP3 class for R-ace GP alongside Hadrien David.

== Personal life ==
Schwarze's father, Dr. Jörg Schwarze, is a doctor who works as an orthodontist and operates his own private practice.

== Karting record ==
=== Karting career summary ===
Season	Series	Team	Position
2022	Rotax Max Euro Trophy - DD2	Nees Racing	18th
2022	Rotax Max Challenge Germany - DD2	Nees Racing	15th
2022	Rotax Max Challenge Golden Trophy - DD2	Nees Racing	7th
2023	Rotax Max Challenge Germany - Wintercup - DD2	Nees Racing	1st

== Racing record ==
=== Racing career summary ===
Season	Series	Team	Races	Wins	Poles	F/Laps	Podiums	Points	Position
2023	Ginetta Junior Championship	Elite Motorsport	27	2	3	5	11	607	**2nd**
2024	GB3 Championship	Elite Motorsport	23	0	0	0	0	219	9th
2025	Le Mans Cup - LMP3	R-ace GP	7	3	3	1	5	116	**1st**
2025	GB3 Championship	VRD Racing	15	1	0	1	3	143	15th
2025–26	Asian Le Mans Series - LMP3	R-ace GP	2	0	0	0	0	8	19th
2026	European Le Mans Series - LMP3	R-ace GP	6	1	2	1	3	76	4th
2026	Nürburgring Langstrecken-Serie – SP10	Toyota Racing United	1	0	0	0	0	0	NC†
2026–27	Asian Le Mans Series - LMP2	DKR Engineering							

^{*} Season in progress.

=== Complete Ginetta Junior Championship results ===
(key) (Races in bold indicate pole position) (Races in italics indicate fastest lap)

Year	Team	1	2	3	4	5	6	7	8	9	10	11	12	13	14	15	16	17	18	19	20	21	22	23	24	25	26	27	DC	Points
2023	Elite Motorsport	OUL; 1; 3	OUL; 2; 2	OUL; 3; 2	SIL1; 1; 8	SIL1; 2; 2	SIL1; 3; 4	DON1; 1; 1	DON1; 2; 10	DON1; 3; 3	SIL2; 1; 8	SIL2; 2; 2	SIL2; 3; 5	SIL2; 4; 3	**SIL2**; **5**; 7	**SIL2**; **6**; 2	SNE; 1; 4	SNE; 2; 4	SNE; 3; 5	CAD; 1; 6	CAD; 2; 5	CAD; 3 Ret	BHGP; 1; 2	BHGP; 2; 5	BHGP; 3; 4	**DON2**; **1**; 1	DON2; 2; 6	DON2; 3; 4	2nd	607

=== Complete GB3 Championship results ===
(key) (Races in bold indicate pole position) (Races in italics indicate fastest lap)

Year	Team	1	2	3	4	5	6	7	8	9	10	11	12	13	14	15	16	17	18	19	20	21	22	23	24	DC	Points
2024	Elite Motorsport	OUL; 1; 18	OUL; 2; 8	OUL; 3; 13^{3}	SIL1; 1; 15	SIL1; 2; 12	SIL1; 3 C	SPA; 1; 8	SPA; 2; 13	SPA; 3; 7	HUN; 1; 12	HUN; 2; 9	HUN; 3; 10^{5}	ZAN; 1; 6	ZAN; 2 Ret	ZAN; 3; 4^{2}	SIL2; 1; 6	SIL2; 2; 10	SIL2; 3; 5	DON; 1; 8	DON; 2; 18	DON; 3; 17	BRH; 1; 4	BRH; 2; 8	BRH; 3 Ret	9th	219
2025	VRD Racing	SIL1; 1; 16	SIL1; 2; 13	SIL1; 3; 15^{1}	ZAN; 1; 11	ZAN; 2; 11	ZAN; 3; 1^{3}	SPA; 1; 2	SPA; 2; 13	SPA; 3; 9	HUN; 1 Ret	HUN; 2; 7	HUN; 3; 3^{1}	SIL2; 1; 14	SIL2; 2 Ret	SIL2; 3; 14^{1}	BRH; 1	BRH; 2	BRH; 3	DON; 1	DON; 2	DON; 3	MNZ; 1	MNZ; 2	MNZ; 3	15th	143

=== Complete Le Mans Cup results ===
(key) (Races in bold indicate pole position; results in italics indicate fastest lap)

Year	Entrant	Class	Chassis	1	2	3	4	5	6	7	Rank	Points
2025	R-ace GP	LMP3	Duqueine D09	CAT; 8	LEC; 5	LMS; 1; 2	LMS; 2; 2	**SPA**; 1	**SIL**; 1	**ALG**; 1	1st	116

=== Complete Asian Le Mans Series results ===
(key) (Races in bold indicate pole position) (Races in italics indicate fastest lap)

Year	Team	Class	Car	Engine	1	2	3	4	5	6	Pos.	Points
2025–26	R-ace GP	LMP3	Duqueine D09	Toyota V35A 3.5 L V6	SEP; 1; 8 (Note: Schwarze did not fulfil his mandated minimum drive time during race 1 of the 2025 4 Hours of Sepang, meaning that he did not receive points for that event.)	SEP; 2; 6	DUB; 1	DUB; 2	ABU; 1	ABU; 2	19th	8

=== Complete European Le Mans Series results ===
(key) (Races in bold indicate pole position; results in italics indicate fastest lap)

Year	Entrant	Class	Chassis	Engine	1	2	3	4	5	6	Rank	Points
2026	R-ace GP	LMP3	Duqueine D09	Toyota V35A 3.5 L V6	**CAT**; 2	LEC; 6	IMO; 8	**SPA**; 2	SIL; 1	ALG; 10	4th	76

^{*} Season still in progress.
