= 2026–27 TA2 NZ Championship =

Motor racing competition season

The 2026–27 TA2 NZ Championship (known for commercial reasons as the 2026–27 SP Tools TA2 NZ Championship) is a national motor racing series conducted using TA2-class cars. This is the second season to be granted championship status by MotorSport New Zealand.

The season began at Hampton Downs Motorsport Park on September 19 2026, and will conclude at Taupo International Motorsport Park on 16 May 2027. Caleb Byers entered the season as the defending champion although would be confined to a part-time schedule due to budgetary constraints.

== Calendar ==
The following circuits are due to host a round of the 2026-27 championship.

Round	Circuit	Date	Supporting	Map of circuit locations
2026				2026–27 TA2 NZ Championship is located in New Zealand
1	Hampton Downs Motorsport Park (Hampton Downs, North Waikato)	19 September		2026–27 TA2 NZ Championship is located in New Zealand
2	Taupo International Motorsport Park (Taupō, Waikato)	13–15 November	GR86 Championship New Zealand	2026–27 TA2 NZ Championship is located in New Zealand
2027				2026–27 TA2 NZ Championship is located in New Zealand
3	Teretonga Park (Invercargill, Southland)	22–24 January	Formula Regional Oceania Trophy; GR86 Championship New Zealand	2026–27 TA2 NZ Championship is located in New Zealand
4	Highlands Motorsport Park (Cromwell, Southland)	29–31 January	Formula Regional Oceania Trophy; GR86 Championship New Zealand	2026–27 TA2 NZ Championship is located in New Zealand
5	Hampton Downs Motorsport Park (Hampton Downs, North Waikato)	19–21 February	GR86 Championship New Zealand	2026–27 TA2 NZ Championship is located in New Zealand
6	Hampton Downs Motorsport Park (Hampton Downs, North Waikato)	21 March		2026–27 TA2 NZ Championship is located in New Zealand
7	Taupo International Motorsport Park (Taupō, Waikato)	14–16 May	Supercars Championship	2026–27 TA2 NZ Championship is located in New Zealand

== Teams and drivers ==
Manufacturer	Car	Team	No.	Driver	Class	Rounds
Chevrolet	Camaro	Pitcher Motorsport	11	(New Zealand) Mark Pitcher	M	1–2
Chevrolet	Camaro	Stickman Racing	38	(New Zealand) Lance Gerlach	M	2
Chevrolet	Camaro	Stickman Racing	61	(New Zealand) Karl Gaines	M	1–2
Chevrolet	Camaro	Ward Demoltion	69	(New Zealand) Peter Ward	M	1–2
Chevrolet	Camaro	GearWrench	71	(New Zealand) Jamie McDonald		1–2
Chevrolet	Camaro	TDX	143	(New Zealand) John Roberts	M	2
Chevrolet	Camaro	Caleb Byers Motorsport	TBC	(New Zealand) Caleb Byers		TBC
Dodge	Challenger	Callum Pratt Motorsport	3	(New Zealand) Callum Pratt		2
Dodge	Challenger	TA2 New Zealand	10	(New Zealand) Ajay Giddy		1
Dodge	Challenger	Dylan Grant Racing	20	(New Zealand) Dylan Grant		1–2
Dodge	Challenger		24	(New Zealand) Maurice Shapley	M	1–2
Dodge	Challenger	Stickman Racing	77	(New Zealand) Elton Wichman	M	2
Dodge	Challenger	Stickman Racing	98	(New Zealand) Leo Bult	M	2
Ford	Mustang	BATT Racing	5	(New Zealand) Andrew Turner	M	1–2
Ford	Mustang	Waltec Motorsport	51	(Australia) Tyler Cheney		2
Ford	Mustang	Waltec Motorsport	118	(Australia) Jarrod Hughes		2
Ford	Mustang	MacKenzie Motorsport	74	(New Zealand) Toby Elmiger		1–2
Ford	Mustang	Neale Motorsport	88	(New Zealand) Chris White Jr.		1–2
Ford	Mustang	Arrow Lighting & Electrical	97	(New Zealand) Roger Beuvink	M	1
Ford	Mustang	Red Hot Couriers	777	(Australia) Declan Fraser		2

Icon	Class
M	Masters

== Results and standings ==
=== Season summary ===
Rnd		Circuit	Pole position	Fastest lap	Winning driver	Winning vehicle	Master winner
1	R1	Hampton Downs Motorsport Park (Hampton Downs, North Waikato)	(New Zealand) Chris White Jr.	(New Zealand) Chris White Jr.	(New Zealand) Chris White Jr.	Ford Mustang	(New Zealand) Andrew Turner
1	R2	Hampton Downs Motorsport Park (Hampton Downs, North Waikato)		(New Zealand) Chris White Jr.	(New Zealand) Chris White Jr.	Ford Mustang	(New Zealand) Peter Ward
2	R1	Taupo International Motorsport Park (Taupō, Waikato)	(Australia) Declan Fraser	(Australia) Declan Fraser	(Australia) Declan Fraser	Ford Mustang	(New Zealand) Peter Ward
2	R2	Taupo International Motorsport Park (Taupō, Waikato)		(Australia) Jarrod Hughes	(Australia) Jarrod Hughes	Ford Mustang	(New Zealand) Karl Gaines
2	R3	Taupo International Motorsport Park (Taupō, Waikato)		(Australia) Jarrod Hughes	(Australia) Tyler Cheney	Ford Mustang	(New Zealand) Karl Gaines
3	R1	Teretonga Park (Invercargill, Southland)					
3	R2	Teretonga Park (Invercargill, Southland)					
3	R3	Teretonga Park (Invercargill, Southland)					
4	R1	Highlands Motorsport Park (Cromwell, Southland)					
4	R2	Highlands Motorsport Park (Cromwell, Southland)					
4	R3	Highlands Motorsport Park (Cromwell, Southland)					
5	R1	Hampton Downs Motorsport Park (Hampton Downs, North Waikato)					
5	R2	Hampton Downs Motorsport Park (Hampton Downs, North Waikato)					
5	R3	Hampton Downs Motorsport Park (Hampton Downs, North Waikato)					
6	R1	Hampton Downs Motorsport Park (Hampton Downs, North Waikato)					
6	R2	Hampton Downs Motorsport Park (Hampton Downs, North Waikato)					
6	R3	Hampton Downs Motorsport Park (Hampton Downs, North Waikato)					
7	R1	Taupo International Motorsport Park (Taupō, Waikato)					
7	R2	Taupo International Motorsport Park (Taupō, Waikato)					
7	R3	Taupo International Motorsport Park (Taupō, Waikato)					

=== Championship standings ===
==== Overall ====
Pos.	Driver	HAM1		TAU1			TER			HIG			HAM2			HAM3			TAU2			Points
Pos.	Driver	R1	R2	R1	R2	R3	R1	R2	R3	R1	R2	R3	R1	R2	R3	R1	R2	R3	R1	R2	R3	Points
1	(New Zealand) Chris White Jr.	1	1	6	2	4																428
2	(New Zealand) Toby Elmiger	3	4	3	5	6																354
3	(New Zealand) Dylan Grant	2	10	5	6	5																323
4	(New Zealand) Jamie McDonald	4	2	8	7	8																323
5	(New Zealand) Karl Gaines	6	6	10	9	9																261
6	(New Zealand) Peter Ward	7	5	9	10	10																259
7	(Australia) Jarrod Hughes			2	1	2																227
8	(Australia) Declan Fraser			1	3	3																215
9	(New Zealand) Mark Pitcher	8	8	13	15	11																286
10	(Australia) Tyler Cheney			4	4	1																198
11	(New Zealand) Andrew Turner	5	11	11	12	DQ																195
12	(New Zealand) Maurice Shapley	8	9	17	14	14																177
13	(New Zealand) Leo Bult	9	7	16	Ret	Ret																154
14	(New Zealand) Callum Pratt			7	8	7																135
15	(New Zealand) Ajay Giddy	Ret	3																			106
16	(New Zealand) Lance Gerlach			12	13	13																88
17	(New Zealand) John Roberts			15	11	12																83
18	(New Zealand) Elton Wichman			14	16	Ret																74
19	(New Zealand) Roger Beuvink	11	Ret																			54
Pos.	Driver	R1	R2	R1	R2	R3	R1	R2	R3	R1	R2	R3	R1	R2	R3	R1	R2	R3	R1	R2	R3	Points
Pos.	Driver	HAM1		TAU1			TER			HIG			HAM2			HAM3			TAU2			Points

==== Master class ====
Pos.	Driver	HAM1		TAU1			TER			HIG			HAM2			HAM3			TAU2			Points
Pos.	Driver	R1	R2	R1	R2	R3	R1	R2	R3	R1	R2	R3	R1	R2	R3	R1	R2	R3	R1	R2	R3	Points
1	(New Zealand) Karl Gaines	6	6																			220
2	(New Zealand) Peter Ward	7	5																			217
3	(New Zealand) Andrew Turner	5	11																			197
4	(New Zealand) Leo Bult	9	7																			179
5	(New Zealand) Mark Pitcher	8	8																			174
6	(New Zealand) Maurice Shapley	10	9																			153
7	(New Zealand) Roger Beuvink	11	Ret																			77
Pos.	Driver	R1	R2	R1	R2	R3	R1	R2	R3	R1	R2	R3	R1	R2	R3	R1	R2	R3	R1	R2	R3	Points
Pos.	Driver	HAM1		TAU1			TER			HIG			HAM2			HAM3			TAU2			Points
