= 2027 Formula Regional Oceania Trophy =

Motor racing competition

The 2027 Castrol Toyota Formula Regional Oceania Trophy is scheduled to be the twenty-second running of the Formula Regional Oceania Trophy, the premier open-wheel motorsport category in New Zealand, formerly known as the Toyota Racing Series and the Formula Regional Oceania Championship. It will be the second season run under the Formula Regional Oceania Trophy after the most recent change in concept in 2026. Both the Drivers' Champion as well as the Trans-Tasman Trophy winner - the highest-placed Australian or Kiwi driver - will win a guaranteed entry into the 2027 Macau Grand Prix.

The championship will be held in New Zealand over four consecutive weekends in January of 2027.

== Teams and drivers ==
2027 will see the debut of a new chassis and engine package as the championship is scheduled to retire the Tatuus FT-60 it had used since 2020. The new car will be based on the Tatuus F3 T-326 Formula Regional Gen2 chassis and will be powered by an evolution of the 2.0‑litre turbocharged Toyota engine running on 100% fossil-free fuel. The six teams slated to compete in the championship were revealed in June 2026: Series mainstay Giles Motorsport will depart the championship after 17 seasons of competition and will be replaced by Rodin Motorsport.

Team	No.	Driver	Status	Rounds
(United Kingdom) Hitech	TBA	TBA		TBC
(United Kingdom) Hitech	TBA	TBA		TBC
(United Kingdom) Hitech	TBA	TBA		TBC
(New Zealand) Kiwi Motorsport	TBA	(United States) Aidan Schuh		TBC
(New Zealand) Kiwi Motorsport	TBA	TBA		TBC
(New Zealand) Kiwi Motorsport	TBA	TBA		TBC
(New Zealand) M2 Competition	TBA	(New Zealand) Oscar Repetto	R	TBC
(New Zealand) M2 Competition	TBA	TBA		TBC
(New Zealand) M2 Competition	TBA	TBA		TBC
(New Zealand) mtec Motorsport	TBA	(Czech Republic) Dominik Šimek	R	TBC
(New Zealand) mtec Motorsport	TBA	TBA		TBC
(New Zealand) mtec Motorsport	TBA	TBA		TBC
(New Zealand) Rodin Motorsport	TBA	(Brazil) Pedro Clerot		TBC
(New Zealand) Rodin Motorsport	TBA	(New Zealand) Toby McCormack	R	TBC
(New Zealand) Rodin Motorsport	TBA	(United Kingdom) Reza Seewooruthun		TBC
(United States) TJ Speed Motorsports	TBA	(Germany) Arjen Kräling	R	TBC
(United States) TJ Speed Motorsports	TBA	TBA		TBC
(United States) TJ Speed Motorsports	TBA	TBA		TBC

Icon	Status
R	Rookie

== Calendar ==
The 2027 race calendar was announced on 11 June 2026. The series will visit the same four circuits as it did in 2026.

Round		Circuit	Date	Feature race	Support bill	Map of circuit locations
1	R1	Hampton Downs Motorsport Park (Hampton Downs, North Waikato)	8–10 January	TBA	GR86 Championship New Zealand; GT Racing New Zealand; BMW Race Driver Series	2027 Formula Regional Oceania Trophy is located in New Zealand
1	R2	Hampton Downs Motorsport Park (Hampton Downs, North Waikato)	8–10 January	TBA	GR86 Championship New Zealand; GT Racing New Zealand; BMW Race Driver Series	2027 Formula Regional Oceania Trophy is located in New Zealand
1	R3	Hampton Downs Motorsport Park (Hampton Downs, North Waikato)	8–10 January	TBA	GR86 Championship New Zealand; GT Racing New Zealand; BMW Race Driver Series	2027 Formula Regional Oceania Trophy is located in New Zealand
1	R4	Hampton Downs Motorsport Park (Hampton Downs, North Waikato)	8–10 January	TBA	GR86 Championship New Zealand; GT Racing New Zealand; BMW Race Driver Series	2027 Formula Regional Oceania Trophy is located in New Zealand
2	R5	Taupo International Motorsport Park (Taupō, Waikato)	15–17 January	TBA	Taupo Historic Grand Prix; Formula Atlantic NZ Historic; Historic & Vintage Racing Association NZ	2027 Formula Regional Oceania Trophy is located in New Zealand
2	R6	Taupo International Motorsport Park (Taupō, Waikato)	15–17 January	TBA	Taupo Historic Grand Prix; Formula Atlantic NZ Historic; Historic & Vintage Racing Association NZ	2027 Formula Regional Oceania Trophy is located in New Zealand
2	R7	Taupo International Motorsport Park (Taupō, Waikato)	15–17 January	TBA	Taupo Historic Grand Prix; Formula Atlantic NZ Historic; Historic & Vintage Racing Association NZ	2027 Formula Regional Oceania Trophy is located in New Zealand
2	R8	Taupo International Motorsport Park (Taupō, Waikato)	15–17 January	TBA	Taupo Historic Grand Prix; Formula Atlantic NZ Historic; Historic & Vintage Racing Association NZ	2027 Formula Regional Oceania Trophy is located in New Zealand
3	R9	Teretonga Park (Invercargill, Southland District)	22–24 January	TBA	TA2 NZ Championship; GR86 Championship New Zealand; New Zealand Porsche Series Championship; NZ Mazda Racing Super Series	2027 Formula Regional Oceania Trophy is located in New Zealand
3	R10	Teretonga Park (Invercargill, Southland District)	22–24 January	TBA	TA2 NZ Championship; GR86 Championship New Zealand; New Zealand Porsche Series Championship; NZ Mazda Racing Super Series	2027 Formula Regional Oceania Trophy is located in New Zealand
3	R11	Teretonga Park (Invercargill, Southland District)	22–24 January	TBA	TA2 NZ Championship; GR86 Championship New Zealand; New Zealand Porsche Series Championship; NZ Mazda Racing Super Series	2027 Formula Regional Oceania Trophy is located in New Zealand
3	R12	Teretonga Park (Invercargill, Southland District)	22–24 January	TBA	TA2 NZ Championship; GR86 Championship New Zealand; New Zealand Porsche Series Championship; NZ Mazda Racing Super Series	2027 Formula Regional Oceania Trophy is located in New Zealand
4	R13	Highlands Motorsport Park (Cromwell, Otago)	29–31 January	New Zealand Grand Prix	TA2 NZ Championship; GR86 Championship New Zealand; New Zealand Porsche Series Championship; GT New Zealand Championship; Formula Atlantic NZ Historic	2027 Formula Regional Oceania Trophy is located in New Zealand
4	R14	Highlands Motorsport Park (Cromwell, Otago)	29–31 January	New Zealand Grand Prix	TA2 NZ Championship; GR86 Championship New Zealand; New Zealand Porsche Series Championship; GT New Zealand Championship; Formula Atlantic NZ Historic	2027 Formula Regional Oceania Trophy is located in New Zealand
4	R15	Highlands Motorsport Park (Cromwell, Otago)	29–31 January	New Zealand Grand Prix	TA2 NZ Championship; GR86 Championship New Zealand; New Zealand Porsche Series Championship; GT New Zealand Championship; Formula Atlantic NZ Historic	2027 Formula Regional Oceania Trophy is located in New Zealand

== Championship standings ==
=== Scoring system ===
Two qualifying sessions will be held at each weekend, with the first session forming the grid for the first race and the second the grid for the fourth race. The grid for the second race will be formed by reversing the top eight finishers of race one, while the grid for the third race will be formed by taking the fastest lap of each drivers set during the first two races.

A different format will be used for the New Zealand Grand Prix weekend: One qualifying session will be held, divided into three parts, with the slowest cars eliminated after the end of each segment. The results of this session will form the grid for the Grand Prix, while the results of Q1 will form the grid for the first race and the grid for the second race will be formed by reversing the top eight finishers of race one.

Points will be awarded as follows:

Races	Position																			
Races	1st	2nd	3rd	4th	5th	6th	7th	8th	9th	10th	11th	12th	13th	14th	15th	16th	17th	18th	19th	20th
Races 1, 3 & 4	35	31	27	24	22	20	18	16	14	12	10	9	8	7	6	5	4	3	2	1
Race 2	20	18	16	14	12	10	9	8	7	6	5	4	3	2	1					
