= 2023 Ginetta Junior Championship =

Junior motorsport

The 2023 Michelin Ginetta Junior Championship was a multi-event, one make motor racing championship held across England. The championship included a mix of professional teams and privately funded drivers, aged between 14 and 17, competing in Ginetta G40s that conformed to the technical regulations for the championship.

== Teams and drivers ==
Team	No.	Driver	Rounds
R Racing	7	(United Kingdom) Freddie Slater	1–6
R Racing	19	(United Kingdom) Mikey Porter	All
R Racing	27	(United Kingdom) Thomas Ingram Hill	8
R Racing	37	(Algeria) Leo Robinson	2–4
R Racing	48	(United States) Luca Hopkinson	All
R Racing	51	(Spain) Edu Robinson	All
R Racing	78	(United Kingdom) Reza Seewooruthun	All
Preptech UK	16	(United Kingdom) Thomas Spragg	1–5, 7–8
Preptech UK	26	(United Kingdom) Henry Joslyn	2–8
Preptech UK	74	(United Kingdom) Alfie Davies	4, 7–8
Preptech UK	84	(United Kingdom) Brea Angliss	7–8
Elite Motorsport	21	(United Kingdom) Alisha Palmowski	All
Elite Motorsport	22	(United Kingdom) Nick Ellis	7–8
Elite Motorsport	24	(United Kingdom) McKenzie Douglass	1–2
Elite Motorsport	33	(Germany) Hugo Schwarze	All
Elite Motorsport	50	(United Kingdom) Charlie Hart	All
Elite Motorsport	66	(United Kingdom) Freddie Allum	1–5
Fox Motorsport	23	(United Kingdom) Holly Miall	All
Fox Motorsport	24	(United Kingdom) McKenzie Douglass	3–7
Fox Motorsport	45	(United Kingdom) Jack Robinson	7–8
Fox Motorsport	47	(United Kingdom) Harry Moss	All
Xentek Motorsport	31	(United Kingdom) Felix Livesey	1–6
MDD Racing	31	(United Kingdom) Felix Livesey	7–8
Alastair Rushforth Motorsport	37	(Algeria) Leo Robinson	1
Alastair Rushforth Motorsport	84	(United Kingdom) Brea Angliss	1–2
Breakell Racing	84	(United Kingdom) Brea Angliss	3–4
Assetto Motorsport	38	(United Kingdom) Finn Harrison	1–7
Assetto Motorsport	90	(United Kingdom) Chase Fernandez	All

== Race calendar ==
The calendar was unveiled on 21 September 2022, and ran alongside the British GT Championship for the first time, as was previously run as part of the TOCA package.

Round	Circuit	Date	Map of circuit locations
1	(United Kingdom) Oulton Park, Cheshire (International Circuit)	8–10 April	2023 Ginetta Junior Championship (England)
2	(United Kingdom) Silverstone, Northamptonshire (Grand Prix Circuit)	6–7 May	2023 Ginetta Junior Championship (England)
3	(United Kingdom) Donington Park, Leicestershire (Grand Prix Circuit)	27–28 May	2023 Ginetta Junior Championship (England)
4	(United Kingdom) Silverstone, Northamptonshire (Grand Prix and National Circuits)	2–4 June	2023 Ginetta Junior Championship (England)
5	(United Kingdom) Snetterton, Norfolk (300 Circuit)	17–18 June	2023 Ginetta Junior Championship (England)
6	(United Kingdom) Cadwell Park, Lincolnshire	22–23 July	2023 Ginetta Junior Championship (England)
7	(United Kingdom) Brands Hatch, Kent (Grand Prix Circuit)	9–10 September	2023 Ginetta Junior Championship (England)
8	(United Kingdom) Donington Park, Leicestershire (Grand Prix Circuit)	21–22 October	2023 Ginetta Junior Championship (England)

== Race results ==
Round		Circuit	Date	Pole position	Fastest lap	Winning driver	Winning team	Rookie Winner
1	R1	Oulton Park, Cheshire (International Circuit)	8–10 April	(United Kingdom) Freddie Slater	(United Kingdom) Reza Seewooruthun	(United Kingdom) Freddie Slater	R Racing	(United Kingdom) Freddie Slater
1	R2	Oulton Park, Cheshire (International Circuit)	8–10 April	(United Kingdom) Freddie Slater	(Germany) Hugo Schwarze	(United Kingdom) Freddie Slater	R Racing	(United Kingdom) Freddie Slater
1	R3	Oulton Park, Cheshire (International Circuit)	8–10 April		(United Kingdom) Reza Seewooruthun	(United Kingdom) Freddie Slater	R Racing	(United Kingdom) Freddie Slater
2	R4	Silverstone, Northamptonshire (Grand Prix Circuit)	6–7 May	(United Kingdom) Freddie Slater	(Algeria) Leo Robinson	(United Kingdom) Freddie Slater	R Racing	(United Kingdom) Freddie Slater
2	R5	Silverstone, Northamptonshire (Grand Prix Circuit)	6–7 May	(United Kingdom) Freddie Slater	(United Kingdom) Reza Seewooruthun	(United Kingdom) Freddie Slater	R Racing	(United Kingdom) Freddie Slater
2	R6	Silverstone, Northamptonshire (Grand Prix Circuit)	6–7 May		(Germany) Hugo Schwarze	(Algeria) Leo Robinson	R Racing	(Algeria) Leo Robinson
3	R7	Donington Park, Leicestershire (Grand Prix Circuit)	26–27 May	(United Kingdom) Freddie Slater	(United Kingdom) Freddie Slater	(Germany) Hugo Schwarze	Elite Motorsport	(Germany) Hugo Schwarze
3	R8	Donington Park, Leicestershire (Grand Prix Circuit)	26–27 May	(United Kingdom) Freddie Slater	(United Kingdom) Freddie Slater	(United Kingdom) Freddie Slater	R Racing	(United Kingdom) Freddie Slater
3	R9	Donington Park, Leicestershire (Grand Prix Circuit)	26–27 May		(United Kingdom) Chase Fernandez	(United Kingdom) Freddie Slater	R Racing	(United Kingdom) Freddie Slater
4	R10	Silverstone Circuit, Northamptonshire (Grand Prix Circuit)	2–4 June	(United Kingdom) Charlie Hart	(United States) Luca Hopkinson	(United Kingdom) Chase Fernandez	Assetto Motorsport	(United Kingdom) Chase Fernandez
4	R11	Silverstone Circuit, Northamptonshire (Grand Prix Circuit)	2–4 June	(United Kingdom) Freddie Slater	(Germany) Hugo Schwarze	(United Kingdom) Freddie Slater	R Racing	(United Kingdom) Freddie Slater
4	R12	Silverstone Circuit, Northamptonshire (Grand Prix Circuit)	2–4 June	(United Kingdom) Freddie Slater	(United Kingdom) Chase Fernandez	(United Kingdom) Freddie Slater	R Racing	(United Kingdom) Freddie Slater
4	R13	Silverstone Circuit, Northamptonshire (Grand Prix Circuit)	2–4 June	(Algeria) Leo Robinson	(Algeria) Leo Robinson	(United Kingdom) Freddie Slater	R Racing	(United Kingdom) Freddie Slater
4	R14	Silverstone Circuit, Northamptonshire (Grand Prix Circuit)	2–4 June	(Germany) Hugo Schwarze	(United Kingdom) Chase Fernandez	(United Kingdom) Freddie Slater	R Racing	(United Kingdom) Freddie Slater
4	R15	Silverstone Circuit, Northamptonshire (Grand Prix Circuit)	2–4 June	(Germany) Hugo Schwarze	(United Kingdom) Freddie Slater	(United Kingdom) Chase Fernandez	Assetto Motorsport	(United Kingdom) Chase Fernandez
5	R16	Snetterton, Norfolk (300 Circuit)	17–18 June	(United Kingdom) Reza Seewooruthun	(Germany) Hugo Schwarze	(United Kingdom) Freddie Slater	R Racing	(United Kingdom) Freddie Slater
5	R17	Snetterton, Norfolk (300 Circuit)	17–18 June	(United Kingdom) Freddie Slater	(United States) Luca Hopkinson	(United Kingdom) Freddie Slater	R Racing	(United Kingdom) Freddie Slater
5	R18	Snetterton, Norfolk (300 Circuit)	17–18 June		(United Kingdom) Freddie Slater	(United Kingdom) Freddie Slater	R Racing	(United Kingdom) Freddie Slater
6	R19	Cadwell Park, Lincolnshire	22–23 July	(United Kingdom) Freddie Slater	(United Kingdom) Freddie Slater	(United Kingdom) Freddie Slater	R Racing	(United Kingdom) Freddie Slater
6	R20	Cadwell Park, Lincolnshire	22–23 July	(United Kingdom) Freddie Slater	(United Kingdom) Freddie Slater	(United Kingdom) Freddie Slater	R Racing	(United Kingdom) Freddie Slater
6	R21	Cadwell Park, Lincolnshire	22–23 July		(United Kingdom) Chase Fernandez	(United Kingdom) Chase Fernandez	Assetto Motorsport	(United Kingdom) Chase Fernandez
7	R22	Brands Hatch, Kent (Grand Prix Circuit)	9–10 September	(United Kingdom) Reza Seewooruthun	(Germany) Hugo Schwarze	(United Kingdom) Reza Seewooruthun	R Racing	(United Kingdom) Reza Seewooruthun
7	R23	Brands Hatch, Kent (Grand Prix Circuit)	9–10 September	(United Kingdom) Reza Seewooruthun	(United Kingdom) Mikey Porter	(United Kingdom) Reza Seewooruthun	R Racing	(United Kingdom) Reza Seewooruthun
7	R24	Brands Hatch, Kent (Grand Prix Circuit)	9–10 September		(United States) Luca Hopkinson	(United Kingdom) Reza Seewooruthun	R Racing	(United Kingdom) Reza Seewooruthun
8	R25	Donington Park, Leicestershire (Grand Prix Circuit)	21–22 October	(Germany) Hugo Schwarze	(United Kingdom) Chase Fernandez	(Germany) Hugo Schwarze	Elite Motorsport	(Germany) Hugo Schwarze
8	R26	Donington Park, Leicestershire (Grand Prix Circuit)	21–22 October	(United Kingdom) Alisha Palmowski	(United Kingdom) Chase Fernandez	(United Kingdom) Reza Seewooruthun	R Racing	(United Kingdom) Reza Seewooruthun
8	R27	Donington Park, Leicestershire (Grand Prix Circuit)	21–22 October		(United Kingdom) Alisha Palmowski	(United Kingdom) Chase Fernandez	Assetto Motorsport	(United Kingdom) Chase Fernandez

== Championship standings ==
Points system
**1st**	**2nd**	**3rd**	**4th**	**5th**	**6th**	**7th**	**8th**	**9th**	**10th**	**11th**	**12th**	**13th**	**14th**	**15th**	**16th**	**17th**	**18th**	**19th**	**20th**	R1 PP	FL
35	30	26	22	20	18	16	14	12	11	10	9	8	7	6	5	4	3	2	1	1	1

=== Drivers' Championship ===
Pos	Driver	OUL			SIL1			DON1			SIL2						SNE			CAD			BRH			DON2			Total	Drop	Pen.	Points
1	(United Kingdom) Freddie Slater **(R)**	**1**	**1**	1	**1**	**1**	3	**5**	**1**	1	6	**1**	**1**	1	1	3	1	**1**	1	**1**	**1**	Ret							642			642
2	(Germany) Hugo Schwarze **(R)**	3	2	2	8	2	4	1	10	3	8	2	5	3	**7**	**2**	4	4	5	6	5	Ret	2	5	4	**1**	6	4	607		–15	592
3	(United Kingdom) Reza Seewooruthun **(R)**	4	6	4	4	3	5	7	5	9	4	10	12	12	9	12	**2**	8	3	8	7	7	**1**	**1**	1	2	1	2	563	9	-9	545
4	(United Kingdom) Mikey Porter **(R)**	5	10	5	6	9	6	Ret	4	2	3	4	2	5	2	6	8	2	2	2	8	2	5	3	6	Ret	4	5	545		-6	539
5	(United Kingdom) Alisha Palmowski	Ret	3	9	2	5	2	2	7	Ret	9	3	4	11	6	10	10	9	7	3	6	10	3	2	2	4	**2**	8	498		-6	492
6	(United Kingdom) Chase Fernandez **(R)**	9	8	Ret	Ret	10	10	Ret	9	Ret	1	5	8	2	4	1	3	6	8	7	3	1	9	6	3	5	3	1	494		-6	488
7	(United Kingdom) Charlie Hart **(R)**	2	5	Ret	3	6	9	9	3	4	**Ret**	6	6	6	5	4	6	5	4	5	4	3	11	4	5	6	9	6	489		-15	474
8	(United Kingdom) Finn Harrison **(R)**	7	4	3	Ret	8	12	6	Ret	DNS	2	8	9	4	3	5	9	3	DNS	11	2	6	10	10	8				361		–27	334
9	(United Kingdom) McKenzie Douglass	6	7	6	5	7	Ret	3	6	Ret	Ret	9	10	7	10	7	11	7	6	9	9	4	6	Ret	9				310			310
10	(United States) Luca Hopkinson	8	12	Ret	DSQ	11	7	Ret	2	5	12	Ret	3	9	12	15	12	10	12	10	10	8	4	9	7	Ret	7	7	311		–12	299
11	(Spain) Edu Robinson **(R)**	13	13	10	Ret	12	14	Ret	15	8	10	14	13	10	14	11	5	11	10	13	12	12	Ret	7	10	8	12	3	260			260
12	(United Kingdom) Henry Joslyn **(R)**				9	15	8	Ret	8	6	7	17	11	Ret	18	8	7	13	9	4	11	5	7	NC	12	11	5	11	262		–6	256
13	(United Kingdom) Thomas Spragg **(R)**	11	9	Ret	7	Ret	11	10	12	7	13	12	14	8	8	9	13	12	11				8	8	11	3	8	Ret	247			247
14	(Algeria) Leo Robinson **(R)**	15	11	7	14	4	1	4	Ret	11	5	7	7	**Ret**	WD	WD													179			179
15	(United Kingdom) Holly Miall **(R)**	14	17	13	13	Ret	18	12	14	14	17	18	16	16	15	14	16	15	13	15	15	DNS	15	15	17	13	15	10	156			156
16	(United Kingdom) Felix Livesey **(R)**	Ret	15	Ret	11	14	16	Ret	13	10	14	13	17	14	11	17	Ret	16	14	12	13	9	14	Ret	15	12	10	Ret	159		–27	132
17	(United Kingdom) Harry Moss **(R)**	16	14	12	12	Ret	15	11	11	12	16	15	Ret	15	17	18	16	17	15	14	14	11	Ret	14	16	15	11	16	164		-32	132
18	(United Kingdom) Brea Angliss **(R)**	10	16	11	15	Ret	17	13	DNS	13	15	16	15	17	Ret	Ret							12	13	13	7	14	12	128			128
19	(United Kingdom) Freddie Allum **(R)**	12	Ret	8	10	13	13	8	16	Ret	11	11	18	13	16	13	14	14	16										128			128
20	(United Kingdom) Alfie Davies **(R)**										18	Ret	Ret	18	13	16							13	11	Ret	10	13	13	66			66
21	(United Kingdom) Nick Ellis **(R)**																						Ret	12	14	14	Ret	9	35			35
22	(United Kingdom) Thomas Ingram Hill **(R)**																									9	17	14	23			23
23	(United Kingdom) Jack Robinson **(R)**																						16	Ret	18	Ret	16	15	19			19

Colour	Result
Gold	Winner
Silver	Second place
Bronze	Third place
Green	Points classification
Blue	Non-points classification
Blue	Non-classified finish (NC)
Purple	Retired, not classified (Ret)
Red	Did not qualify (DNQ)
Red	Did not pre-qualify (DNPQ)
Black	Disqualified (DSQ)
White	Did not start (DNS)
White	Withdrew (WD)
White	Race cancelled (C)
Blank	Did not practice (DNP)
Blank	Did not arrive (DNA)
Blank	Excluded (EX)

**Bold** – Pole

Italics – Fastest Lap

† — Did not finish, but classified (completed more than 75% of race distance)

**(R)** - Rookie
