= Reza Seewooruthun =

British racing driver (born 2006)

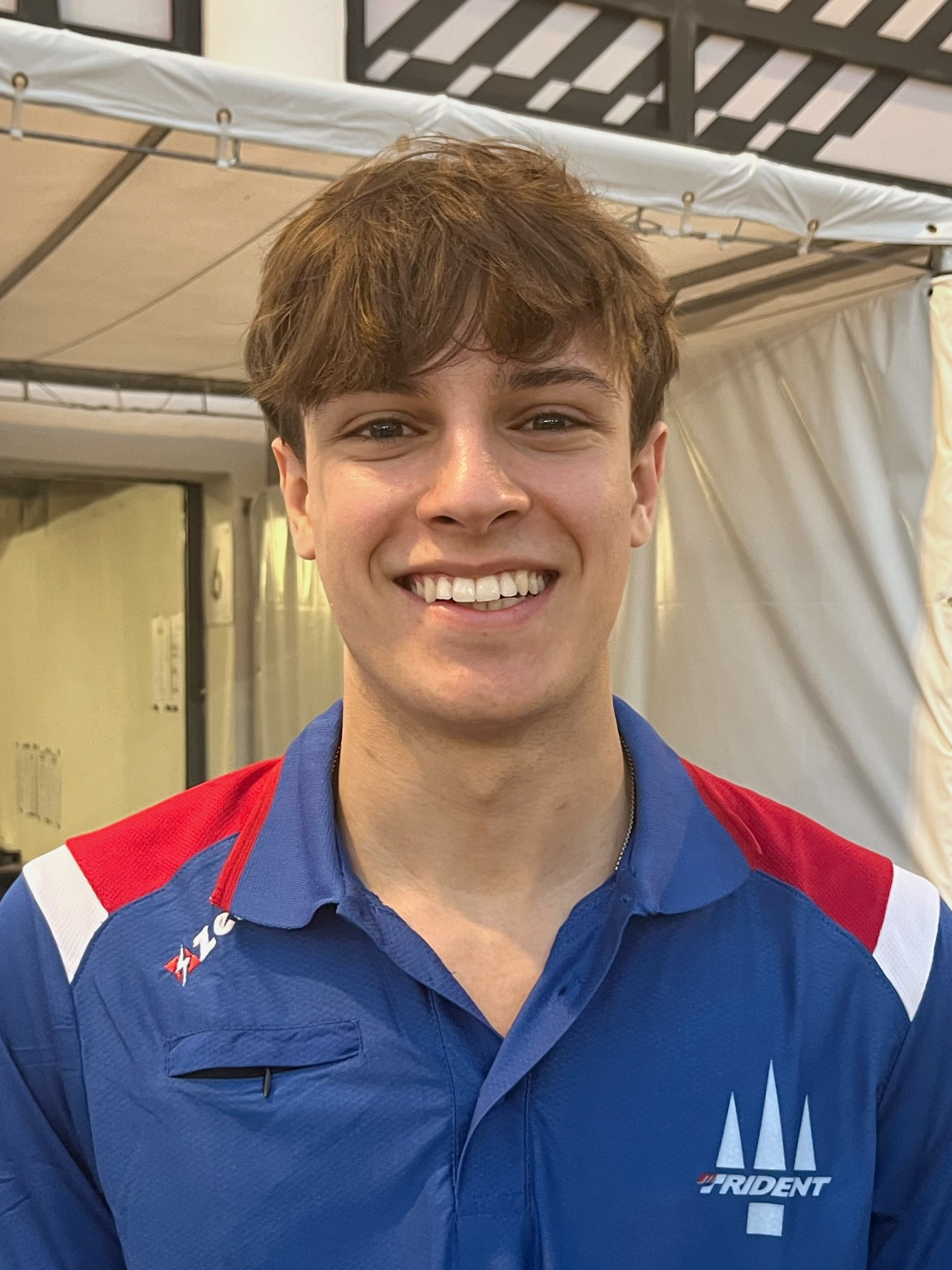
- Seewooruthun at the 2025 Macau Grand Prix
- Nationality: United Kingdom
- Born: Reza Raul Seewooruthun; 8 September 2006 (age 20) Poole, United Kingdom

Formula Regional European Championship career
- Debut season: 2026
- Current team: Rodin Motorsport
- Car number: 4
- Starts: 19
- Wins: 0
- Podiums: 2
- Poles: 0
- Fastest laps: 0
- Best finish: 16th in 2026

Previous series
- 2026 2025 2025–2026 2024 2024 2024 2024 2023: FR European; GB3; FR Middle East; FIA Motorsport Games Formula 4 Cup; Euro 4 F4 British; F4 UAE; Ginetta Junior
Medal record
Formula 4
Representing United Kingdom
FIA Motorsport Games
Bronze medal – third place	2024 Valencia	F4 Cup
- Statistics up to date as of 28 September 2026.

Reza Raul Seewooruthun (born 8 September 2006) is a British racing driver who is set to compete in the FIA Formula 3 Championship with Rodin Motorsport.

Seewooruthun finished third in the 2024 F4 British Championship with Hitech Pulse-Eight, and is a race winner in the GB3 Championship.

== Career ==
=== Karting ===
Seewooruthun started karting in 2021, and made an immediate impact despite no prior experience. He won the English karting championship in the Rotax Junior category just a year into his karting career, which attracted interest from two Ginetta Junior Championship teams.

=== Ginetta Junior Championship ===
In 2023, Seewooruthun would participate in the Ginetta Junior Championship with 2022 title holders R Racing. On his second race weekend, Seewooruthun asserted himself as a driver to watch, scoring a podium in the second race of the weekend at Silverstone. Seewooruthun continued with a consistent season, only finishing outside the top-ten on three occasions during the campaign. In round 7 at Brands Hatch, he completed the full sweep of victories, winning races one, two and three of the weekend as well as securing the two pole positions available. In a long-fought battle for third place with Mikey Porter, Seewooruthun eventually finished third in the standings with four victories to his name.

=== Formula 4 ===
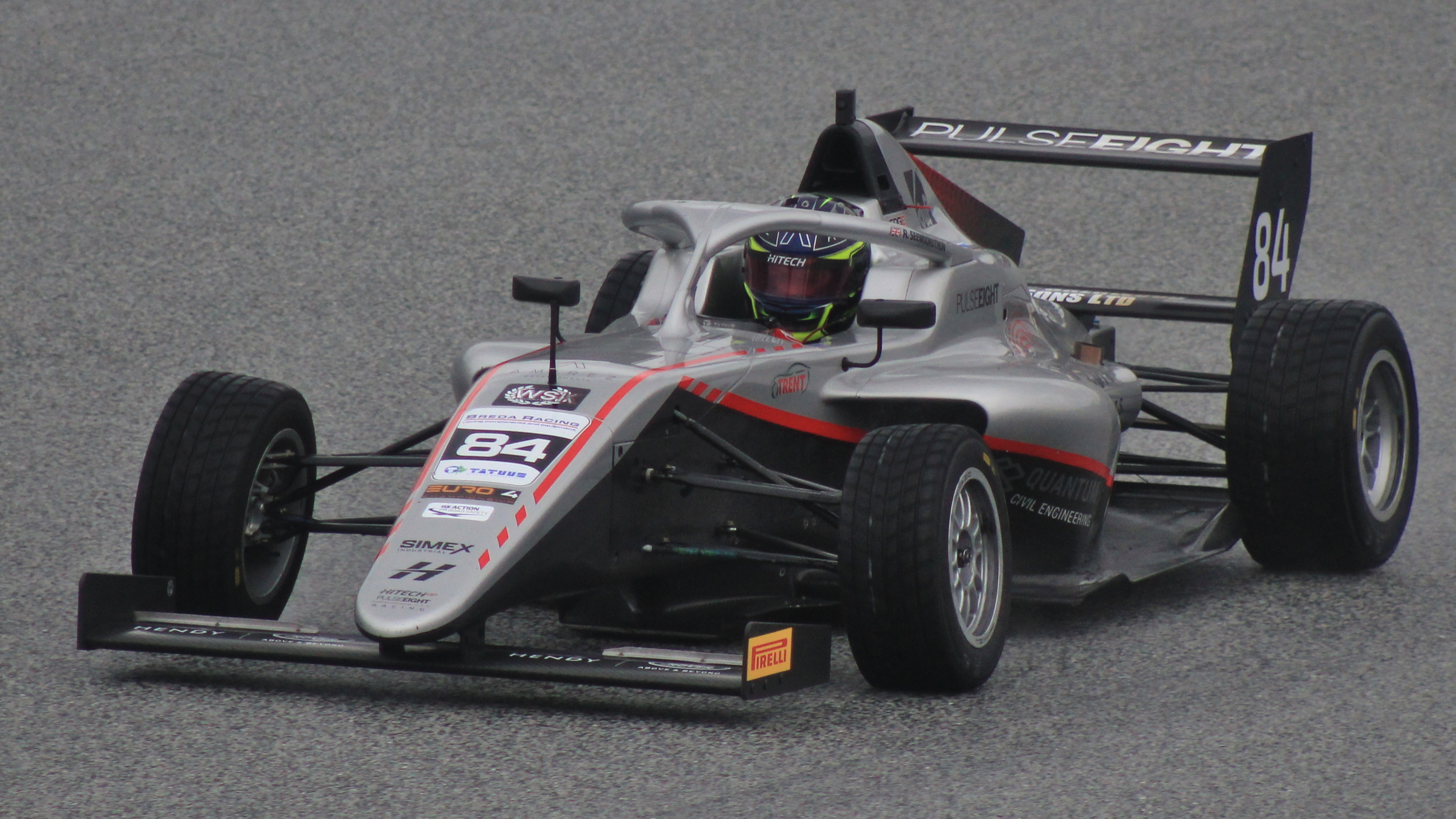
Seewooruthun driving at the Red Bull Ring during the 2024 Euro 4 Championship

In late 2023, it was confirmed that Seewooruthun would be joining Hitech Pulse-Eight for two Formula 4 championships, the 2024 Formula 4 UAE Championship and the 2024 F4 British Championship. He prepared for his year in British F4 with a spell in the UAE, which yielded an impressive podium finish in the wet at Yas Marina. Seewooruthun finished 16th in the standings. After his time in the UAE, he moved on to his full campaign in the F4 British Championship. He scored his first podium in the series at Brands Hatch in round 2, and secured his first victory at Thruxton two rounds later. One more victory followed suit at Silverstone, as he scored a hatful of podiums on his way to another third-placed championship finish. Seewooruthun also made one-off appearances over the course of 2024 in Formula 4, securing a best finish of eighth and a fastest lap, charging from 17th to eighth, in the Euro 4 Championship and also finishing third in the FIA Motorsport Games, representing Team GB.

=== GB3 Championship ===
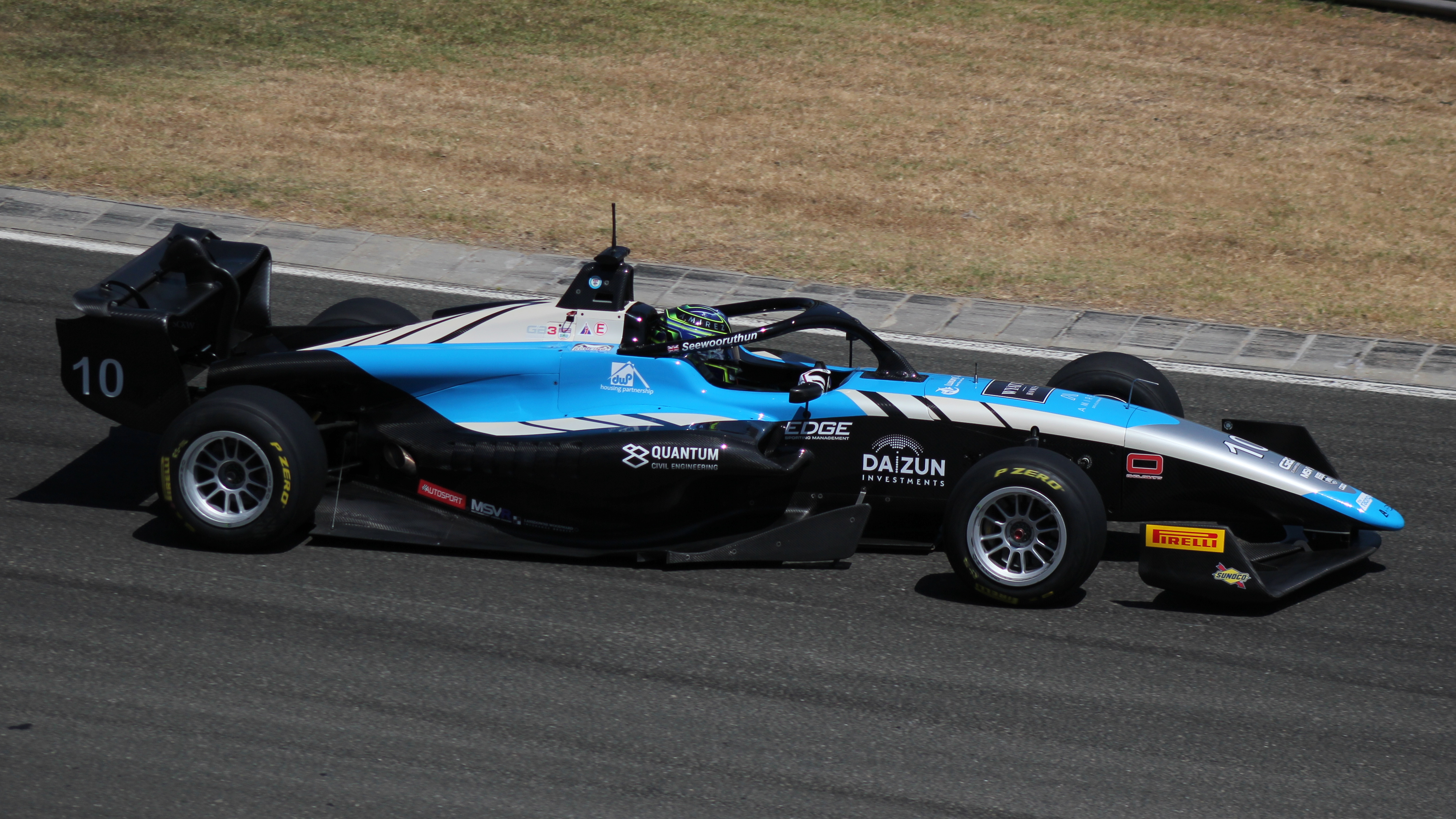
Seewooruthun driving at the Hungaroring during the 2025 GB3 Championship

On 5 December 2024, it was announced that Seewooruthun would be making the step up to join the 2025 GB3 Championship, driving for Argenti with Prema. 2025 was the first year of GB3's new chassis and engine package, the Tatuus MSV GB3-025.

=== Formula Regional ===
==== 2025 ====
Seewooruthun contested the first two rounds of the 2025 Formula Regional Middle East Championship with Mumbai Falcons. At the end of the year, he also participated in the Formula Regional Macau Grand Prix with Trident, but retired on the opening lap of the main race due to an opening lap incident.

==== 2026 ====
In the winter, Seewooruthun contested the Formula Regional Middle East Trophy with Rodin Motorsport. For the rest of the year, Seewooruthun continued with Rodin in the Formula Regional European Championship. At the end of the year, he remained with the team to race in the Macau Grand Prix.

=== FIA Formula 3 ===
==== 2027 ====
Seewooruthun will move up to Formula 3 in 2027, remaining with Rodin Motorsport.

== Racing record ==
=== Racing career summary ===
Season	Series	Team	Races	Wins	Poles	F/Laps	Podiums	Points	Position
2022	Ginetta Junior Winter Series	R Racing	4	0	0	0	1	66	7th
2023	Ginetta Junior Championship	R Racing	27	4	3	3	9	545	**3rd**
2024	Formula 4 UAE Championship	Hitech Pulse-Eight	15	0	0	0	1	24	16th
2024	F4 British Championship	Hitech Pulse-Eight	30	2	1	3	8	271	**3rd**
2024	Euro 4 Championship	Hitech Pulse-Eight	3	0	0	1	0	4	19th
2024	FIA Motorsport Games Formula 4 Cup	Team Great Britain	2	0	0	0	1	N/A	**3rd**
2025	Formula Regional Middle East Championship	Mumbai Falcons Racing Limited	9	0	0	0	0	28	17th
2025	GB3 Championship	Argenti with Prema	24	1	1	2	5	315	5th
2025	Macau Grand Prix	Trident Motorsport	1	0	0	0	0	—N/a	DNF
2026	Formula Regional Middle East Trophy	Rodin Motorsport	10	0	0	0	0	2	22nd
2026	Formula Regional European Championship	Rodin Motorsport	19	0	0	0	2	32	16th
2026	Macau Grand Prix	Rodin Motorsport	0	0	0	0	0	—N/a	TBD
2027	FIA Formula 3 Championship	Rodin Motorsport	0	0	0	0	0	0	TBD
2027	Formula Regional Oceania Trophy	Rodin Motorsport							

* Season still in progress.

=== Complete Ginetta Junior Championship results ===
(key) (Races in bold indicate pole position; races in italics indicate fastest lap)

Year	Team	1	2	3	4	5	6	7	8	9	10	11	12	13	14	15	16	17	18	19	20	21	22	23	24	25	26	27	DC	Points
2023	R Racing	OUL; 1; 4	OUL; 2; 6	OUL; 3; 4	SIL1; 1; 4	SIL1; 2; 3	SIL1; 3; 5	DON1; 1; 7	DON1; 2; 5	DON1; 3; 9	SIL2; 1; 4	SIL2; 2; 10	SIL2; 3; 12	SIL2; 4; 12	SIL2; 5; 9	SIL2; 6; 12	**SNE**; **1**; 2	SNE; 2; 8	SNE; 3; 3	CAD; 1; 8	CAD; 2; 7	CAD; 3; 7	**BRH**; **1**; 1	**BRH**; **2**; 1	BRH; 3; 1	DON2; 1; 2	DON2; 2; 1	DON2; 3; 2	3rd	545

=== Complete Formula 4 UAE Championship results ===
(key) (Races in bold indicate pole position; races in italics indicate fastest lap)

Year	Team	1	2	3	4	5	6	7	8	9	10	11	12	13	14	15	DC	Points
2024	Hitech Pulse-Eight	YMC1; 1; 23	YMC1; 2; 14	YMC1; 3; 16	YMC2; 1; 24	YMC2; 2; 12	YMC2; 3; 17	DUB1; 1; 18	DUB1; 2; 25	DUB1; 3 Ret	YMC3; 1; 11	YMC3; 2; 2	YMC3; 3; 7	DUB2; 1; 24	DUB2; 2; 22	DUB2; 3; 17	16th	24

=== Complete F4 British Championship results ===
(key) (Races in bold indicate pole position) (Races in italics indicate fastest lap)

Year	Team	1	2	3	4	5	6	7	8	9	10	11	12	13	14	15	16	17	18	19	20	21	22	23	24	25	26	27	28	29	30	31	32	DC	Points
2024	Hitech Pulse-Eight	DPN; 1; 5	DPN; 2; 14	DPN; 3 C	BHI; 1; 4	BHI; 2; 18	BHI; 3; 3	SNE; 1; 5	SNE; 2; 18	SNE; 3; 5	THR; 1; 16	THR; 2; 7^{1}	THR; 3; 1	SILGP; 1; 2	SILGP; 2; 8^{4}	**SILGP**; **3**; 1	ZAN; 1; 11	ZAN; 2; 24	ZAN; 3; 2	KNO; 1; 4	KNO; 2; 4^{1}	KNO; 3; 8	DPGP; 1; 8	DPGP; 2; 4	DPGP; 3; 5^{9}	DPGP; 4; 13	SILN; 1; 5	SILN; 2 C	SILN; 3; 6	BHGP; 1; 2	BHGP; 2; 2	BHGP; 3; 9^{2}	BHGP; 4; 3	3rd	271

=== Complete Euro 4 Championship results ===
(key) (Races in bold indicate pole position; races in italics indicate fastest lap)

Year	Team	1	2	3	4	5	6	7	8	9	DC	Points
2024	Hitech Pulse-Eight	MUG; 1	MUG; 2	MUG; 3	RBR; 1; 16	RBR; 2; 20	RBR; 3; 8	MNZ; 1	MNZ; 2	MNZ; 3	19th	4

=== Complete Formula Regional Middle East Championship/Trophy results ===
(key) (Races in bold indicate pole position) (Races in italics indicate fastest lap)

Year	Entrant	1	2	3	4	5	6	7	8	9	10	11	12	13	14	15	DC	Points
2025	Mumbal Falcons Racing Limited	YMC1; 1 Ret	YMC1; 2; 12	YMC1; 3; 9	YMC2; 1; 11	YMC2; 2; 7	YMC2; 3; 6	DUB; 1	DUB; 2	DUB; 3	YMC3; 1	YMC3; 2	YMC3; 3	LUS; 1; 15	LUS; 2; 10	LUS; 3; 15	17th	28
2026	Rodin Motorsport	YMC1; 1; 11	YMC1; 2 Ret	YMC1; 3 DNS	YMC2; 1; 29†	YMC2; 2; 9	YMC2; 3; 21	DUB; 1 Ret	DUB; 2 Ret	DUB; 3; 15	LUS; 1; 24	LUS; 2 C	LUS; 3; 23				22nd	2

=== Complete GB3 Championship results ===
(key) (Races in bold indicate pole position) (Races in italics indicate fastest lap)

Year	Team	1	2	3	4	5	6	7	8	9	10	11	12	13	14	15	16	17	18	19	20	21	22	23	24	DC	Points
2025	Argenti with Prema	SIL1; 1; 15	SIL1; 2; 11	SIL1; 3; 14^{3}	ZAN; 1; 5	ZAN; 2; 4	ZAN; 3; 8^{1}	SPA; 1; 11	SPA; 2; 16	SPA; 3; 3^{12}	HUN; 1; 7	HUN; 2; 10	HUN; 3; 1^{2}	SIL2; 1 Ret	SIL2; 2; 4	SIL2; 3; 2^{4}	BRH; 1; 13	BRH; 2; 15	BRH; 3; 8^{6}	DON; 1; 2	**DON**; **2**; 2	DON; 3 Ret	MNZ; 1; 7	MNZ; 2 Ret	MNZ; 3; 5	5th	315

=== Complete Macau Grand Prix results ===
Year	Team	Car	Qualifying	Quali Race	Main race
2025	(Italy) Trident Motorsport	Tatuus F3 T-318	25th	22nd	DNF
2026	(New Zealand) Rodin Motorsport	Tatuus T-326	TBD	TBD	TBD

=== Complete Formula Regional European Championship results ===
(key) (Races in bold indicate pole position) (Races in italics indicate fastest lap)

Year	Team	1	2	3	4	5	6	7	8	9	10	11	12	13	14	15	16	17	18	19	20	DC	Points
2026	Rodin Motorsport	RBR; 1; 28	RBR; 2; 2	RBR; 3; 19	ZAN; 1; 12	ZAN; 2; 12	SPA; 1; 8	SPA; 2 C	SPA; 3; 12	MNZ; 1 Ret	MNZ; 2; 18	MNZ; 3; 17	HUN; 1; 3	HUN; 2; 9	LEC; 1; 16	LEC; 2; 14	IMO; 1; 12	IMO; 2; 13	IMO; 3; 14	HOC; 1; 9	HOC; 2; 14	16th	32

=== Complete FIA Formula 3 Championship results ===
(key) (Races in bold indicate pole position) (Races in italics indicate fastest lap)

Year	Entrant	1	2	3	4	5	6	7	8	9	10	11	12	13	14	15	16	17	18	19	20	DC	Points
2027	Rodin Motorsport	BHR; SPR	BHR; FEA	JED; SPR	JED; FEA	MEL; SPR	MEL; FEA	MTL; SPR	MTL; FEA	MON; SPR	MON; FEA	SIL; SPR	SIL; FEA	RBR; SPR	RBR; FEA	MNZ; SPR	MNZ; FEA	MAD; SPR	MAD; FEA	IST; SPR	IST; FEA	TBD	TBD
