= Freddie Slater (racing driver) =

British racing driver (born 2008)

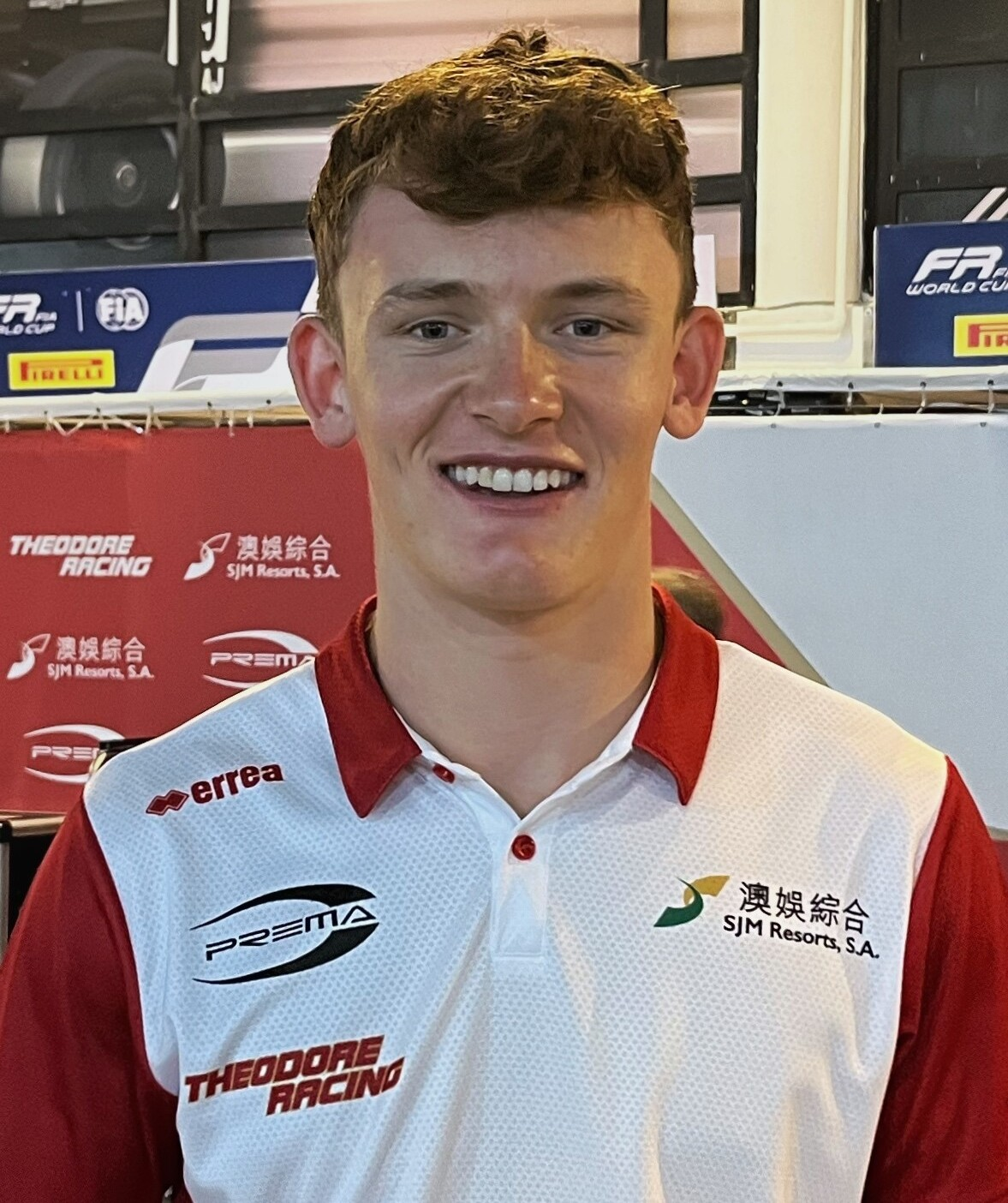
- Slater at the 2025 Macau Grand Prix
- Born: 9 August 2008 (age 18); Stratford-upon-Avon, Warwickshire, England
- Nationality: (United Kingdom) British

FIA Formula 3 Championship career
- Debut season: 2025
- Car number: 5
- Former teams: AIX, Hitech TGR, Trident
- Starts: 22
- Wins: 1
- Podiums: 9
- Poles: 3
- Fastest laps: 1
- Best finish: 2nd in 2026

Previous series
- 2026; 2025–2026; 2025; 2025; 2024–2025; 2024; 2023–2024; 2023–2024; 2023; 2022–2023; 2022: FR Oceania; FIA Formula 3; FR European; FR Middle East; GB3; F4 UAE; Italian F4; Euro 4; F4 British; Ginetta Junior; Ginetta Junior Winter

Championship titles
- 2025; 2024; 2024; 2023; 2022: FR European; Italian F4; F4 UAE; Ginetta Junior; Ginetta Junior Winter
- Statistics up to date as of 15 September 2026.

Freddie Slater (/ˈsleɪ.tər/; born 9 August 2008) is a British racing driver who is set to compete in the FIA Formula 2 Championship for Invicta Racing as part of the Audi Driver Development Programme.

Born and raised in Warwickshire, Slater began competitive kart racing aged seven. During his successful karting career—culminating in his victories at the World Championship in 2020 and the European Championship in 2021 (OK-J) and 2023 (KZ2)—Slater graduated to sportscar racing, aged 14. Following multiple titles in Ginettas, (Note: Slater won the 2022 Ginetta Junior Winter Series and the 2023 Ginetta Junior Championship.) Slater progressed to junior formulae with his record-breaking 2024 campaign in Italian F4, alongside his victory in F4 UAE. Graduating to Formula Regional in 2025, he won the European Championship and finished runner-up in the Middle East. In 2026, he finished runner-up in Formula Regional Oceania and the FIA Formula 3 Championship.

== Early life ==
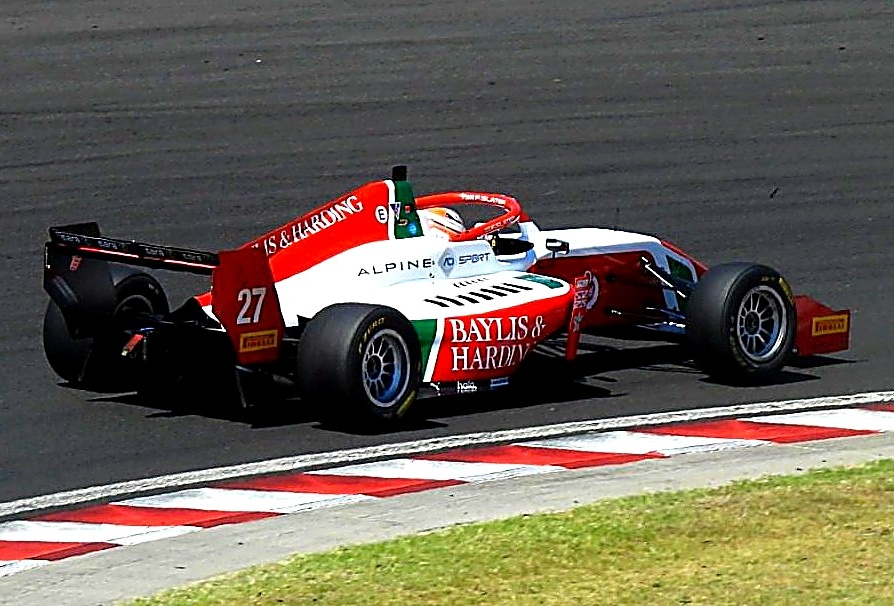
Slater has been sponsored by his family's company, Baylis & Harding, throughout his karting and junior formulae career.

Slater was born on 9 August 2008 in Stratford-upon-Avon, Warwickshire, England. His father, Adrian Slater, is the owner and managing director of luxury toiletries company Baylis & Harding, which was founded by his paternal grandparents, David Slater and Marcia Simmons, in 1968; his aunt, Tania Fossey (née Slater), also manages the company. The company previously sponsored Nick Yelloly in the 2015 GP2 Series and the return of Billy Monger in the 2018 BRDC British Formula 3 Championship. His godfather, Mark Sumpter, competed under the Porsche marquee alongside his father. Slater was raised in Henley-in-Arden alongside his mother, Olivia Slater (née Meredith), two younger brothers—Alfie and Bobby— two younger sisters—Daisy and Dottie, and his 5 parakeets, all named after famous racing drivers.

== Racing career ==
=== Karting (2016–2023) ===
Having grown up with a long-term Porsche competitor as a father, Slater was introduced to karting at an early age and immediately excelled. After receiving his first go-kart aged five, he fell in love with racing and began competitive karting. Throughout his karting career, Slater won no fewer than nine titles in competitive karting in his native country and on an international level. Most notably, Slater won the 2020 Junior World Karting Championship, beating the likes of Arvid Lindblad and Ugo Ugochukwu to the title, and the 2021 FIA Karting European Championship by over 30 points.

=== Ginetta Junior (2022–2023) ===
Aged 14, Slater debuted in sportscar racing at the Ginetta Junior Championship in 2022. After becoming the youngest-ever driver to win the Winter Trophy, he also dominated the 2023 championship.

=== Formula 4 (2023–2024) ===
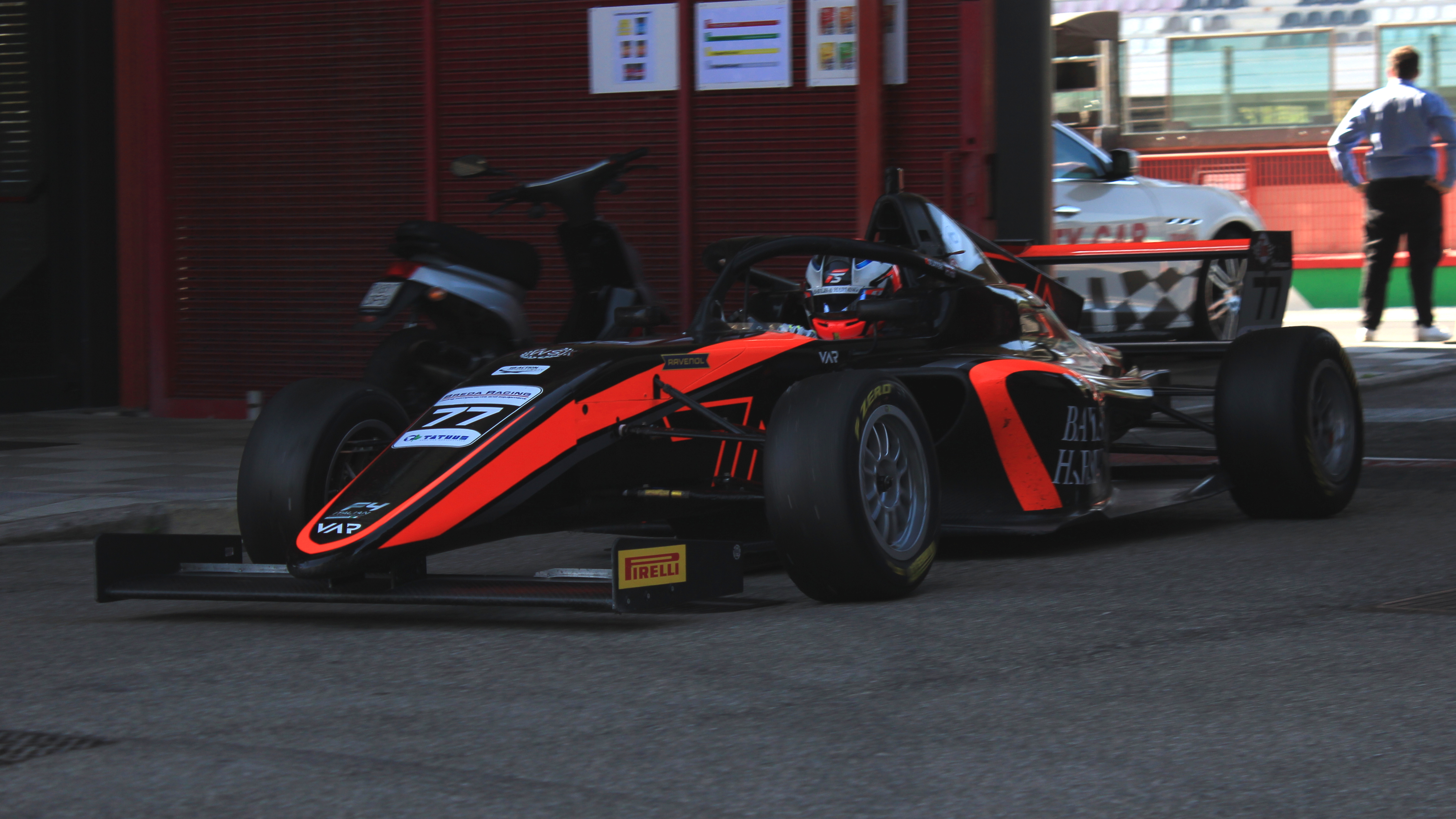
Slater progressed to Formula 4 in 2023, contesting select rounds of the British, Euro 4, and Italian Championships.

==== 2023: Junior formulae debut ====
Slater made his single-seater debut in August 2023 for Double R Racing, in the British Formula 4 Championship, where he finished fourth on his debut establishing the fastest race lap on his third race. In September, Slater entered the Euro 4 Championship for rounds 2 and 3 with Prema Racing. Marking his debut with the team, Slater scored tenth place in the championship with 30 points and one pole-position to his name. Later that month, Slater participated in the Italian F4 Championship during rounds 6 and 7 with Van Amersfoort Racing.

==== 2024: Record-breaking campaigns ====
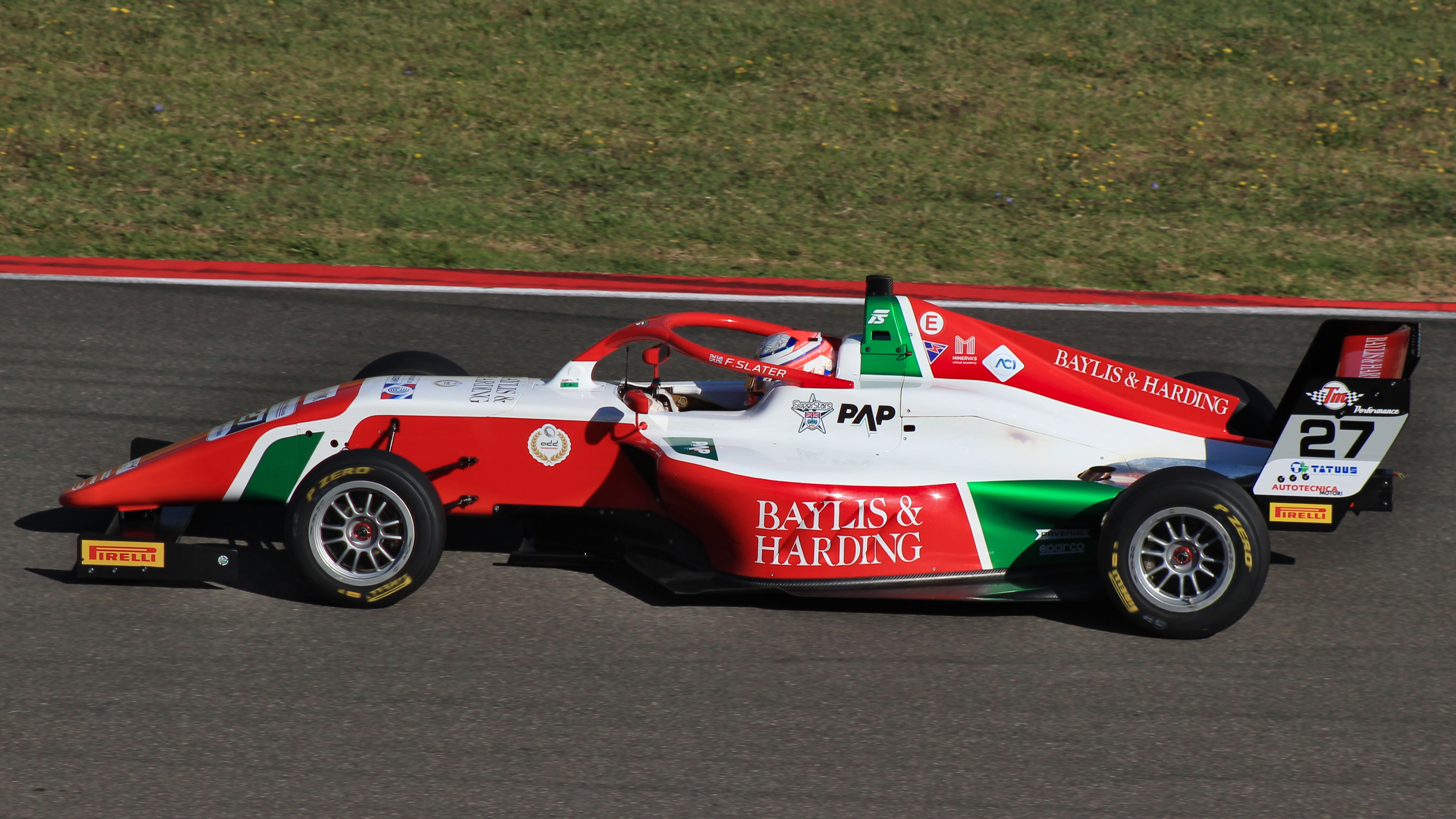
Following victory in the UAE, Slater dominated Italian F4 in 2024 with a record-breaking 15 wins from 21 races.

In preparation for a full season in Italian F4, Slater competed in Formula 4 UAE with Mumbai Falcons. Slater ended up taking the championship victory by beating teammate Kean Nakamura-Berta to the title. In 2024, Slater would race in the Italian F4 Championship full-time with Prema Racing. With his early-season successes, Autosport listed him as one of five "drivers who could become Britain's next [Formula One] winners". He was crowned as the season's champion during Race 2 of Round 6 at the Circuit de Barcelona-Catalunya.

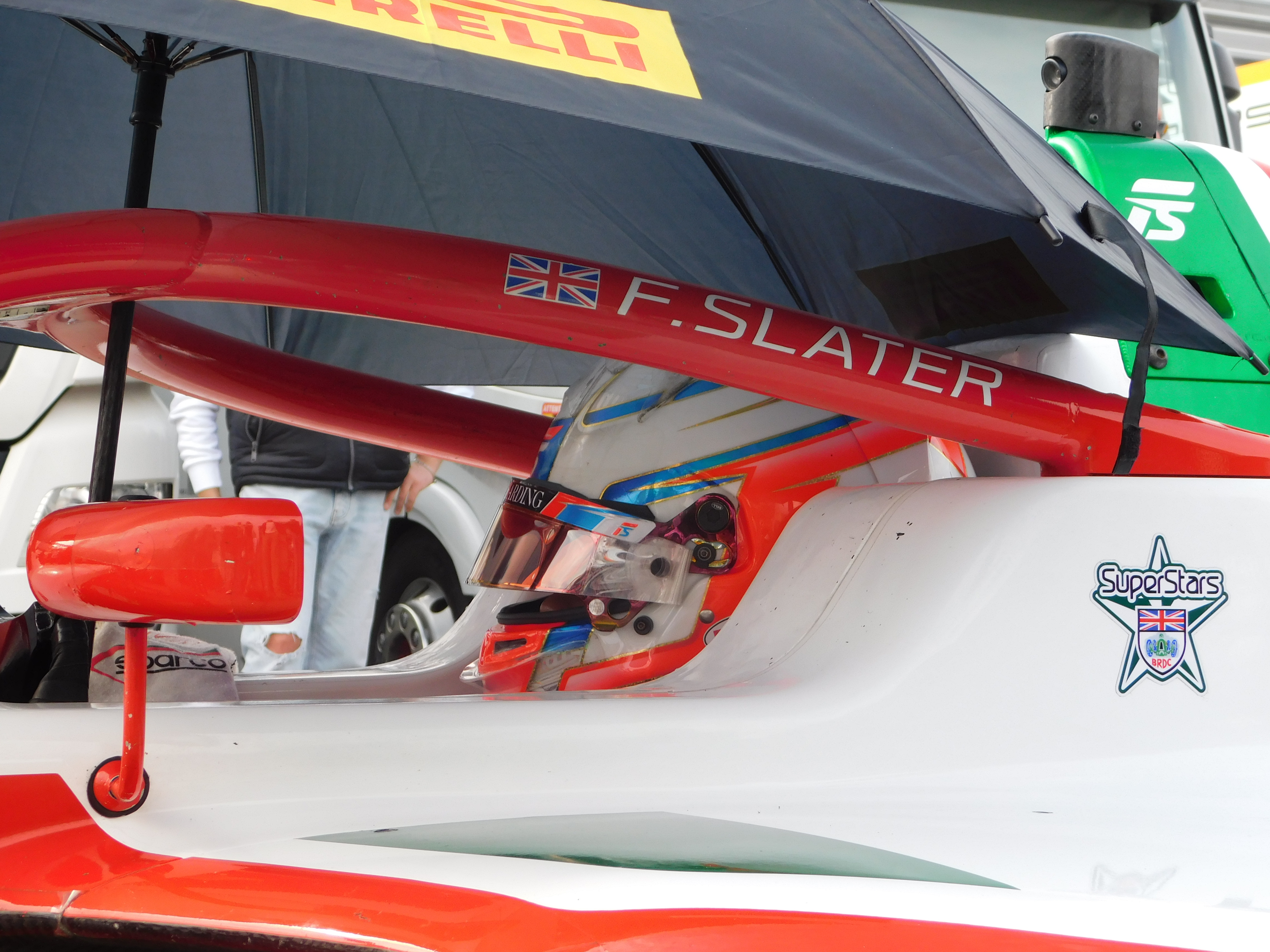
Slater added multiple victories as he finished runner-up in the Euro 4 Championship.

Slater finished the season with a monumental 15 wins, eleven pole positions, and ten fastest laps. This broke the series record for most wins in a season, which was previously held by Andrea Kimi Antonelli with 13 wins in 2022. He would also have the largest points margin in the series' history, with 143 points separating him and runner up Jack Beeton. Slater also raced in the Euro 4 Championship, also with Prema Racing. He finished the season in second, while acquiring two race wins and 106 points.

=== Formula Regional (2024–present) ===
==== 2024: Debut in GB3 and Macau ====
In September 2024, Slater was announced to be making his GB3 debut at Donington Park with Rodin Motorsport. Slater made his Formula Regional debut with SJM Theodore Prema Racing in the 2024 Macau Grand Prix. Slater would not finish the race due to a final lap crash, but was classified in 13th since he completed over 85% of the race. Slater was in fourth for most of the race, but crashed into the barriers while attempting a divebomb overtake on Noel León, who was third.

==== 2025: European champion and Middle East vice-champion ====
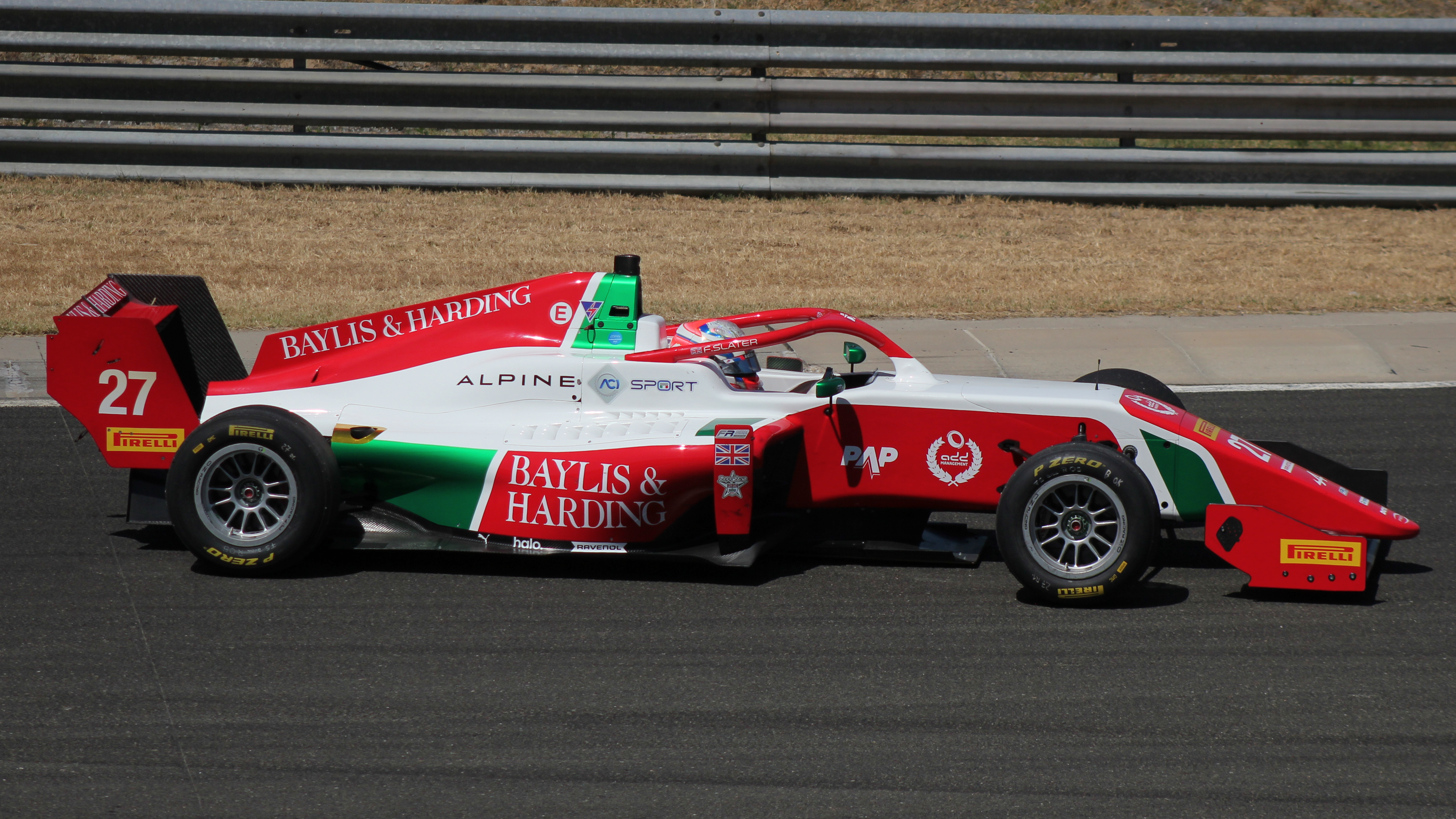
Slater progressed to Formula Regional full-time in 2025, finishing runner-up in the Middle East and winning the European Championship.

In preparation for his 2025 FRECA campaign, Slater competed in the Formula Regional Middle East Championship with Mumbai Falcons. He had a successful start to the season, winning two out of three races and both pole positions during round 1 at the Yas Marina Circuit. During round 4, which was also held at Yas Marina, Slater claimed two more wins and during races one and three. Throughout the season, he was engaged in a title fight with Evan Giltaire of ART Grand Prix, ultimately finishing second in the standings and first in the Rookie Cup, with a total of 228 points and four wins. Slater stepped up to the Formula Regional European Championship for 2025, continuing with Prema Racing.

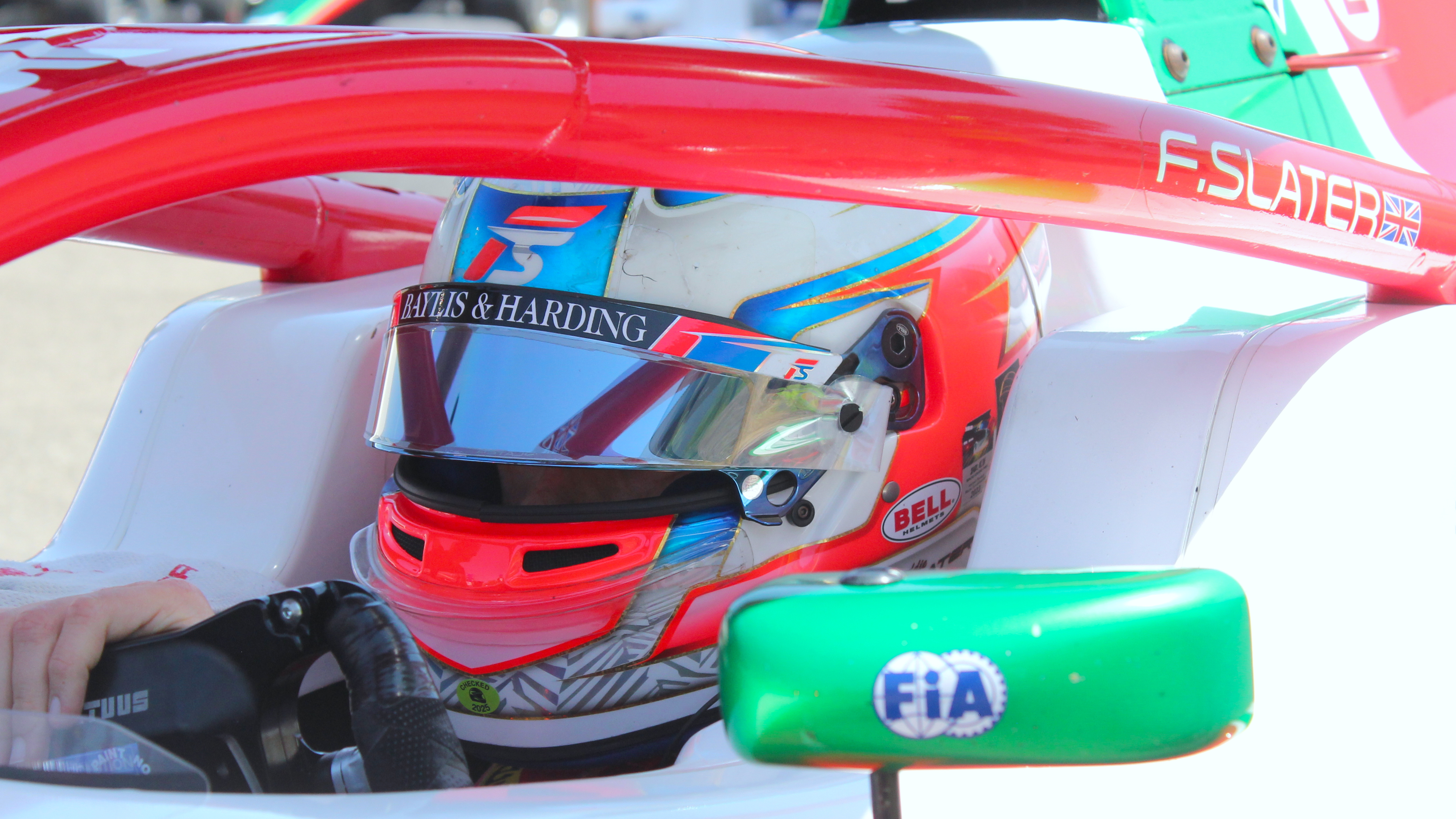
Alongside his main campaigns, Slater made select appearances in the GB3 Championship and took pole position at the Macau Grand Prix.

Along with his main campaigns, Slater competed in selected rounds of the 2025 GB3 Championship with Hillspeed. During the first round at Silverstone Circuit, Slater set the GB3 lap record at the track in qualifying, earning both pole-positions for the round. He proceeded to win two of the three races held, earning the fastest lap for both, with the third race ending in a 13th place finish following a collision with Nikita Johnson. After skipping the second round, Slater returned for the third round at the Circuit de Spa-Francorchamps. After claiming the fastest laps for Race 1 and Race 2, Slater won the third race from last on the grid following a decision to wear dry-weather tyres on the drying track.

==== 2026: Oceania Trophy ====
At the start of 2026, in preparation for his Formula 3 campaign, Slater contested the Formula Regional Oceania Trophy with M2 Competition.

=== FIA Formula 3 (2025–2026) ===
==== 2025: Debut podium ====
In October 2024, Slater partook in the post-season tests in Jerez and Barcelona with Rodin Motorsport. In March 2025, Slater joined AIX Racing to partake in the Bahrain in-season test. He debuted for the team in Sakhir, qualifying tenth and finishing second in the reverse-grid sprint race, (Note: In the 2025 FIA Formula 3 Championship, the top 12 qualifiers were subjected to a reverse-grid in the sprint race.) amidst a battle for the lead with Nikola Tsolov; he retired from the feature race due to damage sustained from an opening-lap collision with Alessandro Giusti. Slater returned during the eighth round at Spa-Francorchamps with Hitech TGR; he qualified twelfth, earning him pole position for the sprint, where he struggled with tyre wear and dropped to tenth before receiving 20 seconds of track limits penalties.

==== 2026: Rookie season ====
Slater stepped up to FIA Formula 3 for the 2026 season with Trident where he finished 2nd, 14 points behind the champion Ugo Ugochukwu

=== FIA Formula 2 (2027) ===
Slater will progress to Formula 2 in 2027 with Invicta Racing.

=== Formula One ===
In January 2026, Slater became the first member of the Audi Driver Development Programme.

He made his free practice debut with Audi at the Mexico City Grand Prix, but only completed 14 laps due to mechanical issues. He made another free practice appearance during the São Paulo Grand Prix, but only completed seven laps as he was forced to stop his car due to reliability problems.

=== Formula E ===
In March 2026, Slater made his Formula E machinery debut, driving for Andretti during the Madrid rookie test.

== Karting record ==
=== Karting career summary ===
Season	Series	Team	Position
2016	Florida Winter Tour — Micro ROK		4th
2016	SKUSA Pro Tour — Micro Swift	Team Benik Kart	15th
2016	SKUSA SuperNationals — Micro Swift	Team Benik Kart	2nd
2017	LGM Series — IAME Cadet	Fusion Motorsport	4th
2017	Kartmasters British Grand Prix — IAME Cadet	Fusion Motorsport	6th
2017	Super 1 National Championships — IAME Cadet	Fusion Motorsport	5th
2017	SKUSA SuperNationals — Mini Swift	Team Benik	10th
2018	LGM Series — IAME Cadet	Fusion Motorsport	2nd
2018	Kartmasters British Grand Prix — IAME Cadet	Fusion Motorsport	3rd
2018	British Championships — IAME Cadet	Fusion Motorsport	4th
2018	IAME International Final — X30 Mini	Fusion Motorsport	2nd
2018	SKUSA SuperNationals — Mini Swift	Team Benik	11th
2019	IAME Winter Cup — X30 Mini	Fusion Motorsport	1st
2019	IAME Euro Series — X30 Mini	Fusion Motorsport	1st
2019	IAME International Final — X30 Mini	Fusion Motorsport	2nd
2019	SKUSA Pro Tour — X30 Junior	Team Benik	1st
2019	SKUSA SuperNationals — X30 Junior	Team Benik	5th
2020	IAME Winter Cup — X30 Junior	Fusion Motorsport	4th
2020	WSK Champions Cup — OK-J	Ricky Flynn Motorsport	14th
2020	South Garda Winter Cup — OK-J	Ricky Flynn Motorsport	2nd
2020	WSK Super Master Series — OK-J	Ricky Flynn Motorsport	8th
2020	WSK Euro Series — OK-J	Ricky Flynn Motorsport	8th
2020	Champions of the Future - OK-J	Ricky Flynn Motorsport	3rd
2020	CIK-FIA European Championship — OK-J	Ricky Flynn Motorsport	7th
2020	CIK-FIA World Championship — OK-J	Ricky Flynn Motorsport	1st
2020	WSK Open Cup — OK-J	Ricky Flynn Motorsport	1st
2021	WSK Champions Cup — OK-J	Ricky Flynn Motorsport	8th
2021	South Garda Winter Cup — OK-J	Ricky Flynn Motorsport	1st
2021	WSK Super Master Series — OK-J	Ricky Flynn Motorsport	4th
2021	WSK Euro Series — OK-J	Ricky Flynn Motorsport	3rd
2021	Champions of the Future — OK-J	Ricky Flynn Motorsport	1st
2021	CIK-FIA European Championship — OK-J	Ricky Flynn Motorsport	1st
2021	CIK-FIA World Championship — OK-J	Ricky Flynn Motorsport	2nd
2021	WSK Open Cup — OK-J	Ricky Flynn Motorsport	3rd
2021	WSK Final Cup — OK-J	Ricky Flynn Motorsport	17th
2022	Champions of the Future Winter Series — OK	Ricky Flynn Motorsport	30th
2022	WSK Super Master Series — OK	Ricky Flynn Motorsport	3rd
2022	WSK Euro Series — OK	Ricky Flynn Motorsport	19th
2022	Italian Championship — OK	Ricky Flynn Motorsport	2nd
2022	Champions of the Future — OK	Ricky Flynn Motorsport	11th
2022	CIK-FIA European Championship — OK	Ricky Flynn Motorsport	21st
2022	CIK-FIA World Championship — OK	Ricky Flynn Motorsport	5th
2023	WSK Champions Cup — KZ2	Birel ART Racing	2nd
2023	WSK Super Master Series — KZ2	Birel ART Racing	6th
2023	WSK Open Series — KZ2	Birel ART Racing	35th
2023	CIK-FIA European Championship — KZ2	Birel ART Racing	1st

=== Complete CIK-FIA results ===
==== Complete CIK-FIA Karting World Championship results ====
Year	Entrant	Class	Circuit	QH	SH	F
2020	Ricky Flynn Motorsport	OK-J	(Portugal) Portimão	3rd	—N/a	1st
2021	Ricky Flynn Motorsport	OK-J	(Spain) Campillos	13th	—N/a	2nd
2022	Ricky Flynn Motorsport	OK	(Italy) Sarno	10th	9th	5th

==== Complete CIK-FIA Karting European Championship results ====
(key) (Races in bold indicate pole position; races in italics indicate fastest lap)

Year	Entrant	Class	1	2	3	4	5	6	7	8	Pos	Points
2020	Ricky Flynn Motorsport	OK-J	ZUE; QH; 12	ZUE; F 12	SAR; QH; 9	SAR; F 2	WAC; QH; 24	WAC; F Ret			7th	26
2021	Ricky Flynn Motorsport	OK-J	GEN; QH; 2	GEN; F 1	**ESS**; **QH**; 1	**ESS**; **F** (10)	SAR; QH; 12	SAR; F 2	ZUE; QH; 1	**ZUE**; **F** 1	1st	99
2022	Ricky Flynn Motorsport	OK	POR; SH; 14	POR; F 7	ZUE; SH; 31	ZUE; F 28	KRI; SH; 23	KRI; F Ret	FRN; SH; 19	FRN; F 19	21st	9
2023	Birel ART Racing	KZ2	ZUE; QH; 1	ZUE; SH; 2	ZUE; F 2	**SAR**; **QH**; 2	SAR; SH; 1	**SAR**; **F** 1			1st	150

== Racing record ==
=== Racing career summary ===
Season	Series	Team	Races	Wins	Poles	F/Laps	Podiums	Points	Position
2022	Ginetta Junior Championship	R Racing	9	0	0	0	0	133	15th
2022	Ginetta Junior Winter Series	R Racing	4	3	1	2	3	122	1st
2023	Ginetta Junior Championship	R Racing	20	16	13	6	18	660	1st
2023	F4 British Championship	Double R Racing	6	0	0	1	0	52	17th
2023	Euro 4 Championship	Prema Racing	6	0	1	0	0	30	10th
2023	Italian F4 Championship	Van Amersfoort Racing	6	0	0	0	0	24	16th
2023	Macau Formula 4 Race	SJM Theodore Prema Racing	1	0	0	0	0	—N/a	9th
2023	Formula 4 UAE Championship – Trophy Round	Prema Racing	2	0	0	0	1	—N/a	NC
2024	Formula 4 UAE Championship	Mumbai Falcons Racing Limited	15	2	0	4	6	172	1st
2024	Italian F4 Championship	Prema Racing	20	15	11	10	16	383	1st
2024	Euro 4 Championship	Prema Racing	9	2	2	1	4	106	2nd
2024	GB3 Championship	Rodin Motorsport	3	0	0	0	0	51	22nd
2024	Macau Grand Prix	SJM Theodore Prema Racing	1	0	0	0	0	—N/a	13th
2025	Formula Regional Middle East Championship	Mumbai Falcons Racing Limited	15	4	4	4	5	228	2nd
2025	Formula Regional European Championship	Prema Racing	20	8	6	7	12	313	1st
2025	FIA Formula 3 Championship	AIX Racing	2	0	0	1	1	10	27th
2025	FIA Formula 3 Championship	Hitech TGR	1	0	0	0	0	10	27th
2025	GB3 Championship	Hillspeed	9	3	2	4	5	203	12th
2025	Macau Grand Prix	SJM Theodore Prema Racing	1	0	1	1	0	—N/a	DNF
2026	Formula Regional Oceania Trophy	M2 Competition	15	3	1	1	6	310	2nd
2026	FIA Formula 3 Championship	Trident	19	1	3	0	8	145	2nd
2026	Formula One	Audi Revolut F1 Team	Test driver						
2027	FIA Formula 2 Championship	Invicta Racing	0	0	0	0	0	0	TBD

* Season still in progress.

=== Complete Ginetta Junior Championship results ===
(key) (Races in bold indicate pole position; races in italics indicate fastest lap)

Year	Entrant	1	2	3	4	5	6	7	8	9	10	11	12	13	14	15	16	17	18	19	20	21	22	23	24	25	26	27	Pos	Points
2022	R Racing	DON; 1	DON; 2	DON; 3	BHI; 1	BHI; 2	BHI; 3	THR1; 1	THR1; 2	CRO; 1	CRO; 2	KNO; 1	KNO; 2	KNO; 3	SNE; 1; 7	SNE; 2; 15	SNE; 3; 14	THR2; 1	THR2; 2	THR2; 3	SIL; 1; 5	SIL; 2; 11	SIL; 3; 5	BHGP; 1; 6	BHGP; 2; 6	BHGP; 3; 7			15th	133
2023	R Racing	**OUL**; **1**; 1	**OUL**; **2**; 1	OUL; 3; 1	**SIL1**; **1**; 1	**SIL1**; **2**; 1	SIL1; 3; 3	**DON1**; **1**; 5	**DON1**; **2**; 1	DON1; 3; 1	SIL2; 1; 6	**SIL2**; **2**; 1	**SIL2**; **3**; 1	SIL2; 4; 1	SIL2; 5; 1	SIL2; 6; 3	SNE; 1; 1	**SNE**; **2**; 1	**SNE**; **3**; 1	**CAD**; **1**; 1	**CAD**; **2**; 1	**CAD**; **3** DNS	BRH; 1	BRH; 2	BRH; 3	DON2; 1	DON2; 2	DON2; 3	1st	660

=== Complete F4 British Championship results ===
(key) (Races in bold indicate pole position; races in italics indicate fastest lap; ^{superscript} indicates points for positions gained)

Year	Entrant	1	2	3	4	5	6	7	8	9	10	11	12	13	14	15	16	17	18	19	20	21	22	23	24	25	26	27	28	29	30	31	Pos	Points
2023	Double R Racing	DPN; 1	DPN; 2	DPN; 3	BHI; 1	BHI; 2	BHI; 3	SNE; 1	SNE; 2	SNE; 3	THR; 1	THR; 2	THR; 3	OUL; 1	OUL; 2	OUL; 3	SIL; 1	SIL; 2	SIL; 3	CRO; 1	CRO; 2	CRO; 3	KNO; 1	KNO; 2	KNO; 3	DPGP; 1; 4	DPGP; 2	DPGP; 3; 4^{16}	DPGP; 4; 15	BHGP; 1; 14	BHGP; 2; 4^{7}	BHGP; 3; 7	17th	52

=== Complete Italian F4 Championship results ===
(key) (Races in bold indicate pole position; races in italics indicate fastest lap)

Year	Entrant	1	2	3	4	5	6	7	8	9	10	11	12	13	14	15	16	17	18	19	20	21	22	Pos	Points
2023	Van Amersfoort Racing	IMO; 1	IMO; 2	IMO; 3	IMO; 4	MIS; 1	MIS; 2	MIS; 3	SPA; 1	SPA; 2	SPA; 3	MNZ; 1	MNZ; 2	MNZ; 3	LEC; 1	LEC; 2	LEC; 3	MUG; 1; 9	MUG; 2; 6	MUG; 3; 27†	VLL; 1; 15	VLL; 2; 5	VLL; 3; 8	16th	24
2024	Prema Racing	**MIS**; **1**; 1	**MIS**; **2**; 1	**MIS**; **3**; 1	IMO; 1 DSQ	IMO; 2; 30	IMO; 3; 1	VLL; 1; 1	**VLL**; **2**; 1	VLL; 3; 1	MUG; 1; 1	**MUG**; **2**; 1	**MUG**; **3**; 1	LEC; 1 DNS	LEC; 2; 1	**LEC**; **3**; 21	CAT; 1; 1	**CAT**; **2**; 1	**CAT**; **3**; 4	MNZ; 1; 1	**MNZ**; **2**; 1	**MNZ**; **3**; 2		1st	383

^{†} Did not finish, but was classified as he had completed more than 90% of the race distance.

=== Complete Euro 4 Championship results ===
(key) (Races in bold indicate pole position; races in italics indicate fastest lap)

Year	Entrant	1	2	3	4	5	6	7	8	9	Pos	Points
2023	Prema Racing	MUG; 1	MUG; 2	MUG; 3	**MNZ**; **1**; 24	MNZ; 2; 4‡	MNZ; 3; 26†	CAT; 1; 7	CAT; 2 Ret	CAT; 3; 7	10th	30
2024	Prema Racing	MUG; 1; 5	MUG; 2; 2	MUG; 3; 10	**RBR**; **1**; 1	RBR; 2; 1	**RBR**; **3**; 3	MNZ; 1; 5	MNZ; 2; 9	MNZ; 3 Ret	2nd	106

^{†} Did not finish, but was classified as he had completed more than 90% of the race distance.
^{‡} Half points awarded as less than 75% of race distance was completed.

=== Complete Formula 4 South East Asia Championship results ===
(key) (Races in bold indicate pole position; races in italics indicate fastest lap)

Year	Entrant	1	2	3	4	5	6	7	8	9	10	11	Pos	Points
2023	SJM Theodore Prema Racing	ZZIC1; 1	ZZIC1; 2	ZZIC1; 3	MAC; 1; 2	MAC; 2; 9	SEP1; 1	SEP1; 2	SEP1; 3	SEP2; 1	SEP2; 2	SEP2; 3	NC†	0

^{†} As Slater was a guest driver, he was ineligible for championship points.

=== Complete Formula 4 UAE Championship results ===
(key) (Races in bold indicate pole position; races in italics indicate fastest lap)

Year	Entrant	1	2	3	4	5	6	7	8	9	10	11	12	13	14	15	Pos	Points
2024	Mumbai Falcons Racing Limited	YMC1; 1; 3	YMC1; 2; 4	YMC1; 3; 1	YMC2; 1; 1	YMC2; 2; 3	YMC2; 3; 2	DUB1; 1; 4	DUB1; 2; 10	DUB1; 3; 4	YMC3; 1 Ret	YMC3; 2; 14	YMC3; 3; 30†	DUB2; 1; 5	DUB2; 2; 4	DUB2; 3; 3	1st	172

^{†} Did not finish, but was classified as he had completed more than 90% of the race distance.

=== Complete GB3 Championship results ===
(key) (Races in bold indicate pole position; races in italics indicate fastest lap; ^{superscript} indicates points for positions gained)

Year	Entrant	1	2	3	4	5	6	7	8	9	10	11	12	13	14	15	16	17	18	19	20	21	22	23	24	Pos	Points
2024	Rodin Motorsport	OUL; 1	OUL; 2	OUL; 3	SIL1; 1	SIL1; 2	SIL1; 3	SPA; 1	SPA; 2	SPA; 3	HUN; 1	HUN; 2	HUN; 3	ZAN; 1	ZAN; 2	ZAN; 3	SIL2; 1	SIL2; 2	SIL2; 3	DON; 1; 6	DON; 2; 4	DON; 3; 5^{2}	BRH; 1	BRH; 2	BRH; 3	22nd	51
2025	Hillspeed	**SIL1**; **1**; 1	**SIL1**; **2**; 1	SIL1; 3; 13	ZAN; 1	ZAN; 2	ZAN; 3	SPA; 1; 9	SPA; 2; 8	SPA; 3; 1^{12}	HUN; 1	HUN; 2	HUN; 3	SIL2; 1	SIL2; 2	SIL2; 3	BRH; 1; 2	BRH; 2; 2	BRH; 3; 6^{5}	DON; 1	DON; 2	DON; 3	MNZ; 1	MNZ; 2	MNZ; 3	12th	203

=== Complete Macau Grand Prix results ===
Year	Entrant	Car	Qualifying	Quali race	Main race
2024	(Hong Kong) SJM Theodore Prema Racing	Tatuus F3 T-318	7th	4th	13th
2025	(Hong Kong) SJM Theodore Prema Racing	Tatuus F3 T-318	**2nd**	**1st**	Ret

=== Complete Formula Regional Middle East Championship results ===
(key) (Races in bold indicate pole position; races in italics indicate fastest lap)

Year	Entrant	1	2	3	4	5	6	7	8	9	10	11	12	13	14	15	Pos	Points
2025	Mumbai Falcons Racing Limited	**YMC1**; **1**; 1	YMC1; 2; 6	**YMC1**; **3**; 1	**YMC2**; **1**; 5	YMC2; 2; 6	YMC2; 3 Ret	DUB; 1; 7	DUB; 2; 2	DUB; 3; 6	YMC3; 1; 1	YMC3; 2; 6	**YMC3**; **3**; 1	LUS; 1; 12	LUS; 2; 11	LUS; 3; 4	2nd	228

=== Complete Formula Regional European Championship results ===
(key) (Races in bold indicate pole position; races in italics indicate fastest lap)

Year	Entrant	1	2	3	4	5	6	7	8	9	10	11	12	13	14	15	16	17	18	19	20	Pos	Points
2025	Prema Racing	**MIS**; **1** Ret	MIS; 2; 2	**SPA**; **1**; 1	SPA; 2 Ret	ZAN; 1; 1	ZAN; 2; 3	HUN; 1; 5	HUN; 2; 1	**LEC**; **1**; 1	**LEC**; **2**; 1	IMO; 1; 2	IMO; 2 DSQ	RBR; 1; 12	RBR; 2; 4	**CAT**; **1**; 2	CAT; 2; 5	HOC; 1; 1	HOC; 2; 4	MNZ; 1; 1	**MNZ**; **2**; 1	1st	313

=== Complete FIA Formula 3 Championship results ===
(key) (Races in bold indicate pole position; races in italics indicate points for the fastest lap of the top-10 finishers)

Year	Entrant	1	2	3	4	5	6	7	8	9	10	11	12	13	14	15	16	17	18	19	20	Pos	Points
2025	AIX Racing	MEL; SPR	MEL; FEA	BHR; SPR; 2	BHR; FEA; Ret	IMO; SPR	IMO; FEA	MON; SPR	MON; FEA	CAT; SPR	CAT; FEA	RBR; SPR	RBR; FEA	SIL; SPR	SIL; FEA							27th	10
2025	Hitech TGR															SPA; SPR; 26	SPA; FEA; C	HUN; SPR	HUN; FEA	MNZ; SPR	MNZ; FEA	27th	10
2026	Trident	MEL; SPR; 9‡	MEL; FEA; 2	MON; SPR; 19	MON; FEA; 3	CAT; SPR; 2	CAT; FEA; 8	RBR; SPR; Ret	RBR; FEA; 3	SIL; SPR; 7	**SIL**; **FEA**; 2	SPA; SPR; Ret	**SPA**; **FEA**; 3	HUN; SPR; 10	HUN; FEA; 1	MNZ; SPR; 2	**MNZ**; **FEA**; Ret	MAD; SPR; 18	MAD; FEA1; Ret	MAD; FEA2; 8		2nd	145

^{‡} Reduced points awarded as between 25% and 50% of race distance was completed.

=== Complete Formula Regional Oceania Trophy results ===
(key) (Races in bold indicate pole position; races in italics indicate fastest lap)

Year	Entrant	1	2	3	4	5	6	7	8	9	10	11	12	13	14	15	16	Pos	Points
2026	M2 Competition	HMP; 1; 6	HMP; 2; 3	HMP; 3; 9	HMP; 4; 4	TAU; 1; 3	TAU; 2; 8	TAU; 3; 2	TAU; 4; 17	TER; 1; 1	TER; 2; 15	TER; 3 C	**TER**; **4**; 1	HIG; 1; 1	HIG; 2; 4	HIG; 3; 5	HIG; 4; 4	2nd	310

=== Complete New Zealand Grand Prix results ===
Year	Team	Car	Qualifying	Main race
2026	(New Zealand) M2 Competition	Tatuus FT-60 - Toyota	4th	4th

=== Complete FIA Formula 2 Championship results ===
(key) (Races in bold indicate pole position) (Races in italics indicate fastest lap)

Year	Entrant	1	2	3	4	5	6	7	8	9	10	11	12	13	14	15	16	17	18	19	20	21	22	23	24	25	26	27	28	DC	Points
2027	Invicta Racing	BHR; SPR	BHR; FEA	JED; SPR	JED; FEA	MEL; SPR	MEL; FEA	MTL; SPR	MTL; FEA	MON; SPR	MON; FEA	SIL; SPR	SIL; FEA	RBR; SPR	RBR; FEA	MNZ; SPR	MNZ; FEA	MAD; SPR	MAD; FEA	BAK; SPR	BAK; FEA	IST; SPR	IST; FEA	MXC; SPR	MXC; FEA	LSL; SPR	LSL; FEA	YMC; SPR	YMC; FEA	TBD	TBD

=== Complete Formula One participations ===
(key) (Races in bold indicate pole position) (Races in italics indicate fastest lap)

Year	Entrant	Chassis	Engine	1	2	3	4	5	6	7	8	9	10	11	12	13	14	15	16	17	18	19	20	21	22	23	WDC	Points
2026	Audi Revolut F1 Team	Audi R26	Audi AFR 26 Hybrid 1.6 V6 t	AUS	CHN	JPN	MIA	CAN	MON	BCN	AUT	GBR	BEL	HUN	NED	ITA	ESP	AZE	BHR	SIN	USA	MXC; TD	SAP; TD	LVG	QAT	ABU	–	–

== Notes ==
Sporting positions
Preceded by Josh Rowledge	Ginetta Junior Winter Championship; Champion; 2022	Succeeded by Isaac Phelps (2024)
Preceded by Josh Rowledge	Ginetta Junior Championship; Champion; 2023	Succeeded by Ethan Jeff-Hall
Preceded by Kacper Sztuka	Italian F4 Championship; Champion; 2024	Succeeded by Kean Nakamura-Berta
Preceded by James Wharton	Formula 4 UAE Championship; Champion; 2024	Folded
Preceded by Tuukka Taponen	Formula Regional Middle East Championship; Rookie Cup; 2025	Incumbent
Preceded by Rafael Câmara	Formula Regional European Championship; Champion; 2025	Incumbent
