= 2024 Jeddah Formula 2 round =

Second round of the 2024 FIA Formula 2 Championship

(Saudi Arabia) 2024 Jeddah Formula 2 round
Round details
- Round 2 of 14 in the 2024 FIA Formula 2 Championship.
- Layout of the Jeddah Corniche Circuit
- Location: Jeddah Corniche Circuit; Jeddah, Saudi Arabia
- Course: Temporary street circuit 6.175 km (3.837 mi)

Sprint Race
- Date: 8 March 2024
- Laps: 20
Podium
First	(Norway) Dennis Hauger	MP Motorsport
Second	(Estonia) Paul Aron	Hitech Pulse-Eight
Third	(Brazil) Enzo Fittipaldi	Van Amersfoort Racing
Fastest lap
Driver	(Estonia) Paul Aron	Hitech Pulse-Eight
- Time: 1:44.607 (on lap 19)

Feature Race
- Date: 9 March 2024
- Laps: 28
Pole position
Driver	(United Kingdom) Oliver Bearman	Prema Racing
Time	1:42.217	
Podium
First	(Brazil) Enzo Fittipaldi	Van Amersfoort Racing
Second	(India) Kush Maini	Invicta Racing
Third	(Norway) Dennis Hauger	MP Motorsport
Fastest lap
Driver	(Brazil) Enzo Fittipaldi	Van Amersfoort Racing
- Time: 1:44.407 (on lap 27)

The 2024 Jeddah FIA Formula 2 round was a motor race that was held between 7 March and 9 March 2024 at the Jeddah Corniche Circuit in Jeddah, Makkah Province, Saudi Arabia. It was the second race of the 2024 FIA Formula 2 Championship and was held in support of the 2024 Saudi Arabian Grand Prix.

== Classification ==
=== Qualifying ===
Qualifying was held on 7 March 2024, at 18:00 local time (UTC+3).

Pos.	No.	Driver	Entrant	Time/Gap	Grid SR	Grid FR
1	3	(United Kingdom) Oliver Bearman	Prema Racing	1:42.217	—^{1}	—^{1}
2	9	(India) Kush Maini	Invicta Racing	+0.025	9	1
3	7	(United States) Jak Crawford	DAMS Lucas Oil	+0.159	8	2
4	1	(France) Victor Martins	ART Grand Prix	+0.180	7	3
5	14	(Brazil) Enzo Fittipaldi	Van Amersfoort Racing	+0.203	6	4
6	4	(Italy) Andrea Kimi Antonelli	Prema Racing	+0.228	5	5
7	11	(Norway) Dennis Hauger	MP Motorsport	+0.238	4	6
8	20	(France) Isack Hadjar	Campos Racing	+0.296	3	7
9	22	(Netherlands) Richard Verschoor	Trident	+0.368	2	8
10	17	(Estonia) Paul Aron	Hitech Pulse-Eight	+0.421	1	9
11	21	(Spain) Pepe Martí	Campos Racing	+0.451	10	10
12	23	(Czech Republic) Roman Staněk	Trident	+0.455	11	11
13	12	(Argentina) Franco Colapinto	MP Motorsport	+0.644	12	12
14	2	(United Kingdom) Zak O'Sullivan	ART Grand Prix	+0.669	13	13
15	10	(Brazil) Gabriel Bortoleto	Invicta Racing	+0.725	14	14
16	5	(Barbados) Zane Maloney	Rodin Motorsport	+0.823	15	15
17	8	(United States) Juan Manuel Correa	DAMS Lucas Oil	+0.901	19^{2}	16
18	25	(United Kingdom) Taylor Barnard	PHM AIX Racing	+0.928	16	17
19	24	(Paraguay) Joshua Dürksen	PHM AIX Racing	+1.327	17	18
20	6	(Japan) Ritomo Miyata	Rodin Motorsport	+1.560	18	19
21	16	(Belgium) Amaury Cordeel	Hitech Pulse-Eight	+1.680	20^{3}	20
107% time: 1:49.372 (+7.155)
—	15	(Mexico) Rafael Villagómez	Van Amersfoort Racing	No time set^{4}	21	21

Notes

- ^1 - Oliver Bearman withdrew from this round after the qualifying due to replacing Carlos Sainz Jr. (appendicitis) in the 2024 Saudi Arabian Grand Prix, after the official grid had been set. As a consequence, all cars from P11 and below moved up one position in the starting grid for the sprint race.
- ^2 - Juan Manuel Correa received a 3-place grid penalty for the Sprint Race for impending Taylor Barnard in the qualifying.
- ^3 - Amaury Cordeel received a 5-place grid penalty for the Sprint Race for causing a collision with Oliver Bearman in the Sakhir Feature Race.
- ^4 - Rafael Villagómez did not start in qualifying due to crash in free practice, but was given permission to start both races from the back of the grid.

=== Sprint race ===
The sprint race was held on 8 March 2024, and was scheduled at 18:10 local time (UTC+3), but was delayed by ten minutes.

Pos.	No.	Driver	Entrant	Laps	Time/Retired	Grid	Points
1	11	(Norway) Dennis Hauger	MP Motorsport	20	41:39.473	4	10
2	17	(Estonia) Paul Aron	Hitech Pulse-Eight	20	+0.782	1	8 (1)
3	14	(Brazil) Enzo Fittipaldi	Van Amersfoort Racing	20	+3.984	6	6
4	5	(Barbados) Zane Maloney	Rodin Motorsport	20	+6.765	15	5
5	7	(United States) Jak Crawford	DAMS Lucas Oil	20	+8.399	8	4
6	4	(Italy) Andrea Kimi Antonelli	Prema Racing	20	+11.140	5	3
7	21	(Spain) Pepe Martí	Campos Racing	20	+13.663	10	2
8	9	(India) Kush Maini	Invicta Racing	20	+14.016	9	1
9	24	(Paraguay) Joshua Dürksen	PHM AIX Racing	20	+17.555	17	
10	10	(Brazil) Gabriel Bortoleto	Invicta Racing	20	+18.062	14	
11	12	(Argentina) Franco Colapinto	MP Motorsport	20	+18.467	12	
12	6	(Japan) Ritomo Miyata	Rodin Motorsport	20	+25.009	18	
13	25	(United Kingdom) Taylor Barnard	PHM AIX Racing	20	+25.032	16	
14	15	(Mexico) Rafael Villagómez	Van Amersfoort Racing	20	+26.645	21	
15^{1}	20	(France) Isack Hadjar	Campos Racing	19	Power Loss	3	
16^{1}	2	(United Kingdom) Zak O'Sullivan	ART Grand Prix	19	+1 lap	13	
DNF	8	(United States) Juan Manuel Correa	DAMS Lucas Oil	15	Accident damage	19	
DNF	16	(Belgium) Amaury Cordeel	Hitech Pulse-Eight	9	Spin	20	
DNF	1	(France) Victor Martins	ART Grand Prix	0	Collision	7	
DSQ	22	(Netherlands) Richard Verschoor	Trident	20	~~(41:38.745)~~ / Disqualified^{2}	2	
DSQ	23	(Czech Republic) Roman Staněk	Trident	20	Disqualified^{2}	11	
WD^{3}	3	(United Kingdom) Oliver Bearman	Prema Racing	—	Withdrew	—	
Fastest lap set by (Estonia) Paul Aron: 1:44.607 (lap 19)

Notes:

- ^1 – Isack Hadjar and Zak O'Sullivan both retired from the race, but were classified as they completed over 90% of the race distance.
- ^2 – Both Trident drivers Richard Verschoor and Roman Staněk were disqualified after the sprint race due to a technical infringement, as it was found that both drivers have had an incorrect throttle pedal progressivity map installed prior to the race which was not in compliance with Article 8.2.6 of the Technical Regulations. As a result, Dennis Hauger inherited the win from Verschoor.
- ^3 – Oliver Bearman was scheduled to start tenth after the grid reversal, but withdrew after Ferrari Formula One driver Carlos Sainz, Jr. withdrew because of appendicitis, and was promoted to the team for the F1 race.

=== Feature race ===
The feature race was held on 9 March 2024, at 16:25 local time (UTC+3).

Pos.	No.	Driver	Entrant	Laps	Time/Retired	Grid	Points
1	14	(Brazil) Enzo Fittipaldi	Van Amersfoort Racing	28	56:57.579	4	25 (1)
2	9	(India) Kush Maini	Invicta Racing	28	+7.895	1	18 (2)
3	11	(Norway) Dennis Hauger	MP Motorsport	28	+9.348	6	15
4	7	(United States) Jak Crawford	DAMS Lucas Oil	28	+9.379	2	12
5	16	(Belgium) Amaury Cordeel	Hitech Pulse-Eight	28	+9.506	20	10
6	4	(Italy) Andrea Kimi Antonelli	Prema Racing	28	+10.044	5	8
7	5	(Barbados) Zane Maloney	Rodin Motorsport	28	+10.442	15	6
8	22	(Netherlands) Richard Verschoor	Trident	28	+11.824	8	4
9	15	(Mexico) Rafael Villagómez	Van Amersfoort Racing	28	+17.541	21	2
10	17	(Estonia) Paul Aron	Hitech Pulse-Eight	28	+25.134	9	1
11	1	(France) Victor Martins	ART Grand Prix	28	+25.680^{1}	3	
12	24	(Paraguay) Joshua Dürksen	PHM AIX Racing	28	+26.269^{2}	18	
13	25	(United Kingdom) Taylor Barnard	PHM AIX Racing	28	+30.424	17	
14	8	(United States) Juan Manuel Correa	DAMS Lucas Oil	28	+38.415	16	
15	6	(Japan) Ritomo Miyata	Rodin Motorsport	28	+40.805	19	
DNF	2	(United Kingdom) Zak O'Sullivan	ART Grand Prix	23	Spin	13	
DNF	20	(France) Isack Hadjar	Campos Racing	20	Power loss	7	
DNF	12	(Argentina) Franco Colapinto	MP Motorsport	14	Suspension	12	
DNF	10	(Brazil) Gabriel Bortoleto	Invicta Racing	1	Driveshaft	14	
DNF	21	(Spain) Pepe Martí	Campos Racing	0	Collision	10	
DNF	23	(Czech Republic) Roman Staněk	Trident	0	Stalled	11	
WD	3	(United Kingdom) Oliver Bearman	Prema Racing	—	Withdrew	—	
Fastest lap set by (Brazil) Enzo Fittipaldi: 1:44.449 (lap 27)

Notes:

- ^1 – Victor Martins originally finished tenth, but was later given a five-second time penalty for causing a collision with Paul Aron. As a result, Martins dropped out of the points into eleventh place, whilst Aron was promoted up to tenth place.
- ^2 – Joshua Dürksen originally finished ninth, but received a ten-second time penalty for leaving the track and gaining an advantage.

== Standings after the event ==
Drivers' Championship standings

	Pos.	Driver	Points
	1	(Barbados) Zane Maloney	47
19	2	(Brazil) Enzo Fittipaldi	32
6	3	(Norway) Dennis Hauger	31
1	4	(Estonia) Paul Aron	29
3	5	(India) Kush Maini	27

Teams' Championship standings

	Pos.	Team	Points
	1	(New Zealand) Rodin Motorsport	49
1	2	(United Kingdom) Invicta Racing	42
3	3	(Netherlands) MP Motorsport	39
	4	(United Kingdom) Hitech Pulse-Eight	39
6	5	(Netherlands) Van Amersfoort Racing	34

- Note: Only the top five positions are included for both sets of standings.

== See also ==
- 2024 Saudi Arabian Grand Prix
- 2024 Jeddah F1 Academy round

Previous round: 2024 Sakhir Formula 2 round	FIA Formula 2 Championship; 2024 season	Next round: 2024 Melbourne Formula 2 round
Previous round: 2023 Jeddah Formula 2 round	Jeddah Formula 2 round	Next round: 2025 Jeddah Formula 2 round
