= 2024 Sakhir Formula 2 round =

Motor racing event

(Bahrain) 2024 Sakhir Formula 2 round
Round details
- Round 1 of 14 in the 2024 FIA Formula 2 Championship.
- Layout of the Bahrain International Circuit
- Location: Bahrain International Circuit; Sakhir, Bahrain
- Course: Permanent racing facility 5.412 km (3.363 mi)

Sprint Race
- Date: 1 March 2024
- Laps: 23
Podium
First	(Barbados) Zane Maloney	Rodin Motorsport
Second	(United States) Jak Crawford	DAMS Lucas Oil
Third	(Spain) Pepe Martí	Campos Racing
Fastest lap
Driver	(Brazil) Enzo Fittipaldi	Van Amersfoort Racing
- Time: 1:45.833 (on lap 23)

Feature Race
- Date: 2 March 2024
- Laps: 33
Pole position
Driver	(Brazil) Gabriel Bortoleto	Invicta Racing
Time	1:41.915	
Podium
First	(Barbados) Zane Maloney	Rodin Motorsport
Second	(Spain) Pepe Martí	Campos Racing
Third	(Estonia) Paul Aron	Hitech Pulse-Eight
Fastest lap
Driver	(Norway) Dennis Hauger	MP Motorsport
- Time: 1:46.743 (on lap 17)

The 2024 Sakhir FIA Formula 2 round was a motor race held between 29 February and 2 March 2024 at the Bahrain International Circuit in Sakhir, Bahrain. It was the first race of the 2024 FIA Formula 2 Championship and was being held in support of the 2024 Bahrain Grand Prix.

Rodin Motorsport driver Zane Maloney got off to a perfect start into the 2024 season as he won both races of the weekend, to become the third driver in the series' history after Felipe Drugovich and Oliver Bearman to do so.

== Report ==
=== Background ===
The round saw the competitive début of the new Dallara F2 2024 chassis. The F2 2024 was introduced to replace the Dallara F2 2018 chassis which had been used since 2018.

=== Team changes ===
New Zealand automotive manufacturer Rodin Cars took over Carlin and renamed the team Rodin Motorsport, after previously becoming majority shareholder in 2023.

Virtuosi Racing was entered under the moniker Invicta Racing after watchmaker Invicta deepened its involvement with the team, having been its title sponsor in 2023.

=== Driver changes ===
Reigning driver's champion Théo Pourchaire left ART Grand Prix and the series, as the category's sporting regulations disallow such title defenses. The previous year's top four finishers – Pourchaire, Frederik Vesti, Jack Doohan, and Ayumu Iwasa – would all exit the series. Reigning FIA Formula 3 Championship champion Gabriel Bortoleto entered the championship with Invicta Racing, with Formula Regional European Championship champion Andrea Kimi Antonelli making his debut in the series for Prema Racing, and reigning Super Formula champion Ritomo Miyata joining Rodin Motorsport for his international motorsport debut with the support of Toyota Gazoo Racing.

== Classification ==
=== Qualifying ===
Qualifying was held on 29 February 2024, at 16:55 local time (UTC+3).

Pos.	No.	Driver	Entrant	Time/Gap	Grid SR	Grid FR
1	10	(Brazil) Gabriel Bortoleto	Invicta Racing	1:41.915	10	1
2	20	(France) Isack Hadjar	Campos Racing	+0.023	9	2
3	5	(Barbados) Zane Maloney	Rodin Motorsport	+0.067	8	3
4	11	(Norway) Dennis Hauger	MP Motorsport	+0.075	7	4
5	6	(Japan) Ritomo Miyata	Rodin Motorsport	+0.088	6	5
6	2	(United Kingdom) Zak O'Sullivan	ART Grand Prix	+0.099	5	6
7	14	(Brazil) Enzo Fittipaldi	Van Amersfoort Racing	+0.155	4	7
8	1	(France) Victor Martins	ART Grand Prix	+0.243	3	8
9	25	(United Kingdom) Taylor Barnard	PHM AIX Racing	+0.292	2	9
10	7	(United States) Jak Crawford	DAMS Lucas Oil	+0.372	1	10
11	21	(Spain) Pepe Martí	Campos Racing	+0.418	11	11
12	17	(Estonia) Paul Aron	Hitech Pulse-Eight	+0.425	12	12
13	8	(United States) Juan Manuel Correa	DAMS Lucas Oil	+0.454	13	13
14	15	(Mexico) Rafael Villagómez	Van Amersfoort Racing	+0.477^{1}	14	14
15	12	(Argentina) Franco Colapinto	MP Motorsport	+0.477^{1}	15	15
16	22	(Netherlands) Richard Verschoor	Trident	+0.729	16	16
17	4	(Italy) Andrea Kimi Antonelli	Prema Racing	+0.778	17	17
18	3	(United Kingdom) Oliver Bearman	Prema Racing	+0.795	18	18
19	16	(Belgium) Amaury Cordeel	Hitech Pulse-Eight	+1.030	19	19
20	23	(Czech Republic) Roman Staněk	Trident	+1.153	20	20
21	24	(Paraguay) Joshua Dürksen	PHM AIX Racing	+1.238	21	21
107% time: 1:49.049 (+7.134)
DSQ	9	(India) Kush Maini	Invicta Racing	1:41.696	22^{2}	22^{2}

Notes

- ^1 – Rafael Villagómez and Franco Colapinto set identical times in qualifying; Villagómez was classified ahead as he set his lap time earlier.
- ^2 – Kush Maini originally qualified first and claimed pole position for the feature race, but was subsequently disqualified after his car's undertray was found to be in violation of series regulations. He was allowed to compete in the races at the stewards' discretion.

=== Sprint race ===
The sprint race was held on 1 March 2024, at 17:15 local time (UTC+3).

Pos.	No.	Driver	Entrant	Laps	Time/Retired	Grid	Points
1	5	(Barbados) Zane Maloney	Rodin Motorsport	23	42:13.726	8	10 (1)
2	7	(United States) Jak Crawford	DAMS Lucas Oil	23	+5.490	1	8
3	21	(Spain) Pepe Martí	Campos Racing	23	+7.057	11	6
4	20	(France) Isack Hadjar	Campos Racing	23	+9.783	9	5
5	17	(Estonia) Paul Aron	Hitech Pulse-Eight	23	+18.188	12	4
6	10	(Brazil) Gabriel Bortoleto	Invicta Racing	23	+18.320	10	3
7	2	(United Kingdom) Zak O'Sullivan	ART Grand Prix	23	+20.135	5	2
8	11	(Norway) Dennis Hauger	MP Motorsport	23	+21.032	7	1
9	6	(Japan) Ritomo Miyata	Rodin Motorsport	23	+21.490	6	
10	22	(Netherlands) Richard Verschoor	Trident	23	+21.839	16	
11	1	(France) Victor Martins	ART Grand Prix	23	+23.840	3	
12	8	(United States) Juan Manuel Correa	DAMS Lucas Oil	23	+26.833	13	
13	9	(India) Kush Maini	Invicta Racing	23	+27.246	22	
14	4	(Italy) Andrea Kimi Antonelli	Prema Racing	23	+30.260	17	
15	24	(Paraguay) Joshua Dürksen	PHM AIX Racing	23	+35.257	21	
16	3	(United Kingdom) Oliver Bearman	Prema Racing	23	+36.247	18	
17	14	(Brazil) Enzo Fittipaldi	Van Amersfoort Racing	23	+56.183	4	
18	12	(Argentina) Franco Colapinto	MP Motorsport	23	+1:04.819	15	
19	15	(Mexico) Rafael Villagómez	Van Amersfoort Racing	23	+1:31.558^{1}	14	
DNF	23	(Czech Republic) Roman Staněk	Trident	19	Retired	20	
DNF	25	(United Kingdom) Taylor Barnard	PHM AIX Racing	16	Brakes	2	
DNF	16	(Belgium) Amaury Cordeel	Hitech Pulse-Eight	0	Collision damage	19	
Fastest lap set by (Brazil) Enzo Fittipaldi: 1:45.833 (lap 23)

Notes

- ^1 – Rafael Villagómez received a ten-second penalty post-race for causing a collision with Amaury Cordeel. His final position was not affected by the penalty.

=== Feature race ===
The feature race was held on 2 March 2024, at 13:30 local time (UTC+3).

Pos.	No.	Driver	Entrant	Laps	Time/Retired	Grid	Points
1	5	(Barbados) Zane Maloney	Rodin Motorsport	32	1:02:46.435	3	25
2	21	(Spain) Pepe Martí	Campos Racing	32	+4.621	11	18
3	17	(Estonia) Paul Aron	Hitech Pulse-Eight	32	+11.781^{1}	12	15
4	2	(United Kingdom) Zak O'Sullivan	ART Grand Prix	32	+12.523	6	12
5	10	(Brazil) Gabriel Bortoleto	Invicta Racing	32	+12.591	1	10 (2)
6	12	(Argentina) Franco Colapinto	MP Motorsport	32	+13.609	15	8
7	9	(India) Kush Maini	Invicta Racing	32	+14.719	22	6
8	11	(Norway) Dennis Hauger	MP Motorsport	32	+16.002	4	4 (1)
9	6	(Japan) Ritomo Miyata	Rodin Motorsport	32	+16.272	5	2
10	4	(Italy) Andrea Kimi Antonelli	Prema Racing	32	+20.405	17	1
11	24	(Paraguay) Joshua Dürksen	PHM AIX Racing	32	+24.035	21	
12	15	(Mexico) Rafael Villagómez	Van Amersfoort Racing	32	+29.532^{1}	14	
13	23	(Czech Republic) Roman Staněk	Trident	32	+31.193	20	
14	22	(Netherlands) Richard Verschoor	Trident	32	+33.702^{2}	17	
15	3	(United Kingdom) Oliver Bearman	Prema Racing	32	+51.135	18	
16	25	(United Kingdom) Taylor Barnard	PHM AIX Racing	32	+58.999	9	
DNF	1	(France) Victor Martins	ART Grand Prix	17	Engine	8	
DNF	7	(United States) Jak Crawford	DAMS Lucas Oil	16	Stalled	10	
DNF	16	(Belgium) Amaury Cordeel	Hitech Pulse-Eight	14	Collision damage	19	
DNF	8	(United States) Juan Manuel Correa	DAMS Lucas Oil	6	Transmission	13	
DNF	20	(France) Isack Hadjar	Campos Racing	0	Collision	2	
DNF	14	(Brazil) Enzo Fittipaldi	Van Amersfoort Racing	0	Collision	7	
Fastest lap set by (Norway) Dennis Hauger: 1:46.743 (lap 17)

Notes:

- ^1 – Paul Aron and Rafael Villagómez both received a five-second time penalty for speeding in the pit lane. However, their final positions were not affected by their penalties.
- ^2 – Richard Verschoor originally finished thirteenth, but received a five-second time penalty for speeding in the pit lane, dropping him down to fourteenth in the final classification.

== Standings after the event ==
Drivers' Championship standings

Pos.	Driver	Points
1	(Barbados) Zane Maloney	36
2	(Spain) Pepe Martí	24
3	(Estonia) Paul Aron	19
4	(Brazil) Gabriel Bortoleto	15
5	(United Kingdom) Zak O'Sullivan	14

Teams' Championship standings

Pos.	Team	Points
1	(New Zealand) Rodin Motorsport	38
2	(Spain) Campos Racing	29
3	(United Kingdom) Invicta Racing	21
4	(United Kingdom) Hitech Pulse-Eight	19
5	(France) ART Grand Prix	14

- Note: Only the top five positions are included for both sets of standings.

== See also ==
- 2024 Bahrain Grand Prix
- 2024 Sakhir Formula 3 round

Previous round: 2023 Yas Island Formula 2 round	FIA Formula 2 Championship; 2024 season	Next round: 2024 Jeddah Formula 2 round
Previous round: 2023 Sakhir Formula 2 round	Sakhir Formula 2 round	Next round: 2025 Sakhir Formula 2 round
