= 2024 Formula 2 Championship =

Motor racing championship

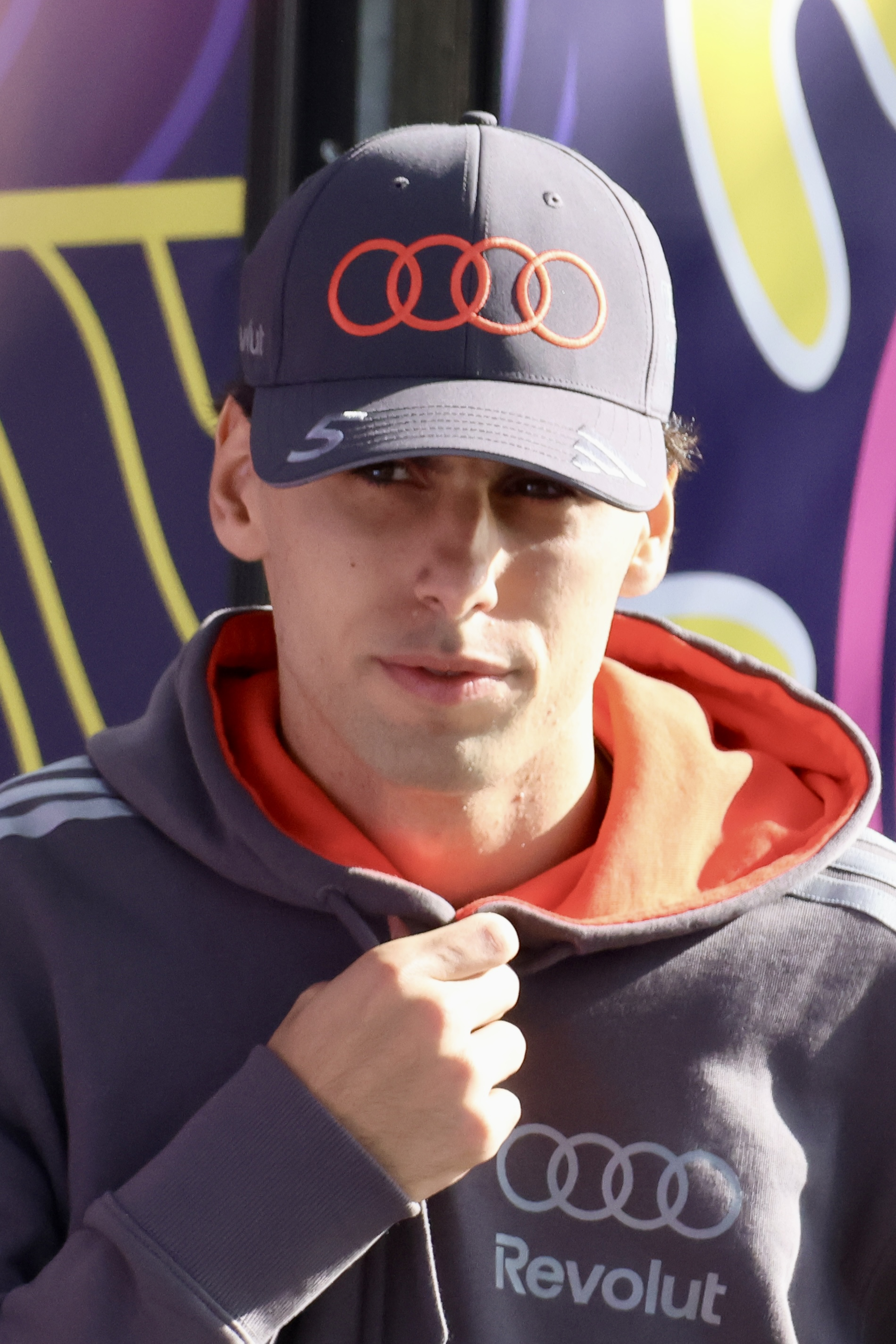
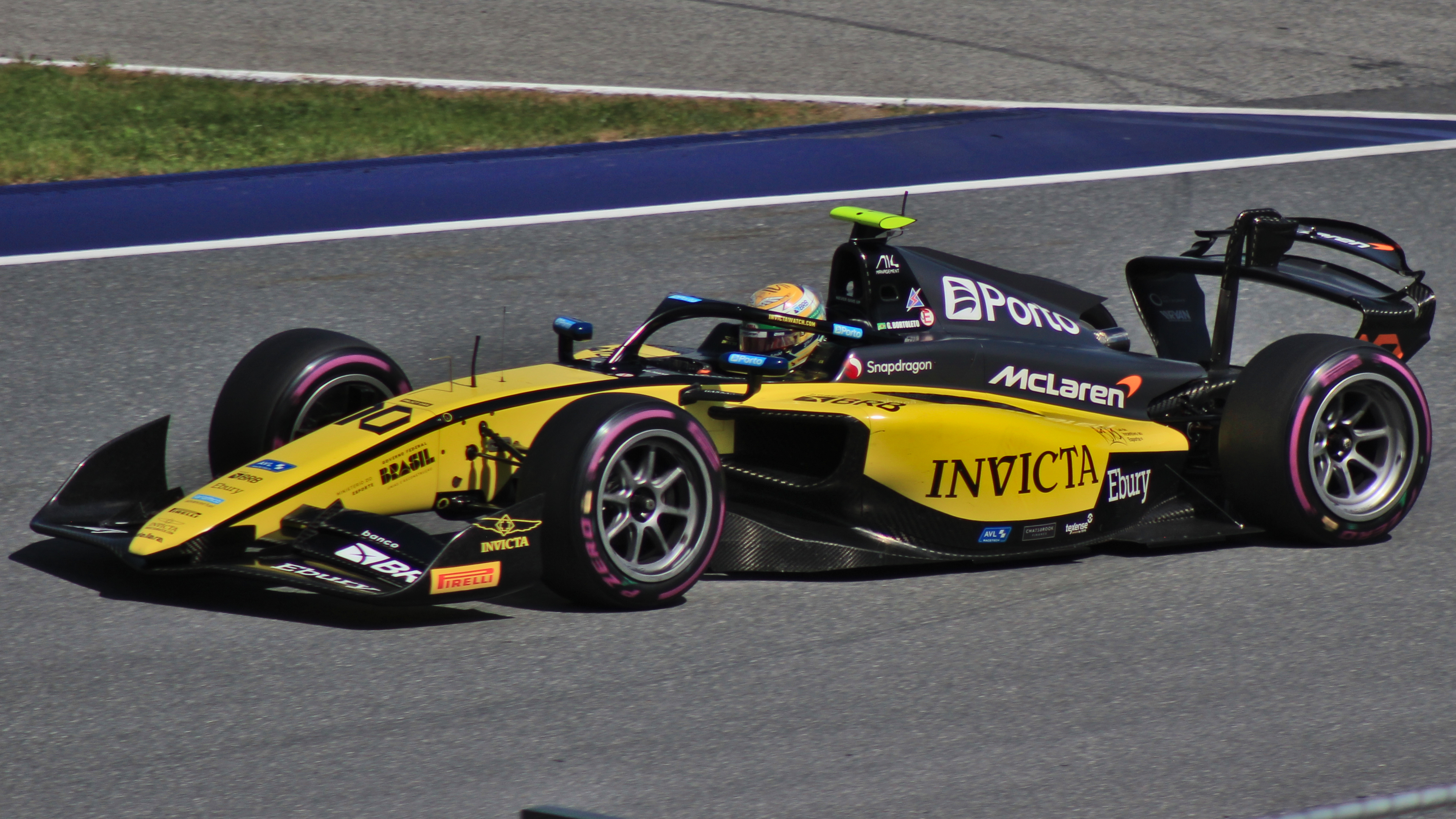
Gabriel Bortoleto (pictured in 2026, left) and his team, Invicta Racing (right), won the Drivers' and Teams' Championships, respectively.

The 2024 FIA Formula 2 Championship was a motor racing championship for Formula 2 cars sanctioned by the Fédération Internationale de l'Automobile (FIA). The championship was the fifty-eighth season of Formula 2 racing and the eighth season run under the FIA Formula 2 Championship moniker. Formula 2 is an open-wheel racing category serving as the second tier of formula racing in the FIA Global Pathway. The category was run in support of selected rounds of the 2024 Formula One World Championship. The 2024 season saw the debut of a new chassis and engine package; as the championship was a spec series, all teams and drivers who competed in the championship ran the same car, the Dallara F2 2024.

ART Grand Prix entered the championship as the reigning Teams' Champions, having secured their title at the final race of the 2023 season in Abu Dhabi. Gabriel Bortoleto and Invicta Racing became the 2024 Drivers' and Teams' Champions in the final round of the season in Abu Dhabi, respectively. By winning the title, Bortoleto became the fourth rookie driver to be crowned Formula 2 Driver's Champion. Furthermore, he is the fourth driver after Charles Leclerc, George Russell and Oscar Piastri to win both the Formula 2 and FIA Formula 3 Championship titles in consecutive seasons.

A record 18 different drivers won races throughout all 28 races. Runner up Isack Hadjar won four races, whilst Oliver Bearman won three races. Champion Gabriel Bortoleto won two races, as did Zane Maloney, Zak O'Sullivan, Andrea Kimi Antonelli, and Joshua Dürksen. Paul Aron took one win during the season, as well as Dennis Hauger, Enzo Fittipaldi, Roman Staněk, Franco Colapinto, Taylor Barnard, Victor Martins, Jak Crawford, Kush Maini, Richard Verschoor, and Pepe Martí.

== Entries ==
The following teams and drivers competed in the 2024 Formula 2 Championship. As the championship was a spec series, all teams competed with an identical Dallara F2 2024 chassis using a V6 turbo engine developed by Mecachrome. All teams competed with tyres supplied by Pirelli.

Entrant	No.	Driver name	Rounds
(France) ART Grand Prix	1	(France) Victor Martins	All
(France) ART Grand Prix	2	(United Kingdom) Zak O'Sullivan	1–11
(France) ART Grand Prix	2	(United Kingdom) Luke Browning	12–14
(Italy) Prema Racing	3	(United Kingdom) Oliver Bearman	1–11, 13–14 (Note: Oliver Bearman was entered into the Jeddah round, but later withdrew after getting called up by Scuderia Ferrari to compete in the Saudi Arabian Grand Prix in Formula One.)
(Italy) Prema Racing	3	(Italy) Gabriele Minì	12
(Italy) Prema Racing	4	(Italy) Andrea Kimi Antonelli	All (Note: Andrea Kimi Antonelli was entered into the Yas Island round, but later withdrew due to illness.)
(New Zealand) Rodin Motorsport	5	(Barbados) Zane Maloney	1–13
(New Zealand) Rodin Motorsport	5	(Italy) Leonardo Fornaroli	14
(New Zealand) Rodin Motorsport	6	(Japan) Ritomo Miyata	All
(France) DAMS Lucas Oil	7	(United States) Jak Crawford	All
(France) DAMS Lucas Oil	8	(United States) Juan Manuel Correa	1–12
(France) DAMS Lucas Oil	8	(Sweden) Dino Beganovic	13–14
(United Kingdom) Invicta Racing	9	(India) Kush Maini	All
(United Kingdom) Invicta Racing	10	(Brazil) Gabriel Bortoleto	All
(Netherlands) MP Motorsport	11	(Norway) Dennis Hauger	1–12
(Netherlands) MP Motorsport	11	(Netherlands) Richard Verschoor	13–14
(Netherlands) MP Motorsport	12	(Argentina) Franco Colapinto	1–10
(Netherlands) MP Motorsport	12	(Germany) Oliver Goethe	11–14
(Netherlands) Van Amersfoort Racing	14	(Brazil) Enzo Fittipaldi	1–12
(Netherlands) Van Amersfoort Racing	14	(United Kingdom) John Bennett	13–14
(Netherlands) Van Amersfoort Racing	15	(Mexico) Rafael Villagómez	All
(United Kingdom) Hitech Pulse-Eight	16	(Belgium) Amaury Cordeel	All
(United Kingdom) Hitech Pulse-Eight	17	(Estonia) Paul Aron	All
(Spain) Campos Racing	20	(France) Isack Hadjar	All
(Spain) Campos Racing	21	(Spain) Pepe Martí	All
(Italy) Trident	22	(Netherlands) Richard Verschoor	1–12
(Italy) Trident	22	(United States) Max Esterson	13–14
(Italy) Trident	23	(Czech Republic) Roman Staněk	1–11
(Italy) Trident	23	(Australia) Christian Mansell	12–14
(Germany) PHM AIX Racing (1–3) (Germany) AIX Racing (4–14)	24	(Paraguay) Joshua Dürksen	All
(Germany) PHM AIX Racing (1–3) (Germany) AIX Racing (4–14)	25	(United Kingdom) Taylor Barnard	1–10
(Germany) PHM AIX Racing (1–3) (Germany) AIX Racing (4–14)	25	(Netherlands) Niels Koolen	11–12
(Germany) PHM AIX Racing (1–3) (Germany) AIX Racing (4–14)	25	(United Kingdom) Cian Shields	13–14

=== Team changes ===
Following the partnership that saw Invicta Watch Group become Virtuosi Racing's title sponsor in 2023, the company purchased an ownership stake in the team and entered the 2024 season under the Invicta Racing guise.

After Rodin Cars became Carlin's majority shareholder in 2023 and rebranded the team as Rodin Carlin, the Carlin family departed the team, with Rodin taking full ownership and renaming the team Rodin Motorsport. Rodin became the championship's first team ever to run under a non-European nationality.

PHM Racing now operated independently of Charouz Racing System, after the latter co-ran the team during the 2023 season. Ahead of the season, PHM also announced the AIX Investment Group as a new title sponsor, changing the team's name to PHM AIX Racing.

DAMS became DAMS Lucas Oil following a strengthened sponsorship deal with American oil company Lucas Oil.

==== Mid-season changes ====
The AIX Investment Group completed its acquisition of PHM Racing ahead of the fourth round of the season and rebranded the team to AIX Racing.

=== Driver changes ===
Reigning champion Théo Pourchaire left ART Grand Prix and the series to move to Japan to compete in the Super Formula Championship with Team Impul. Williams Driver Academy member Zak O'Sullivan replaced him, having finished second in the previous year's FIA Formula 3 season with Prema Racing.

Prema Racing saw 2023 runner-up Frederik Vesti leave the championship to join Cool Racing in the LMP2 class of the European Le Mans Series. Vesti was replaced by Andrea Kimi Antonelli, who skipped over FIA Formula 3 after securing the Formula Regional European Championship title in 2023.

Rodin Motorsport replaced VAR-bound Enzo Fittipaldi with reigning Super Formula Champion Ritomo Miyata, who switched to racing in Europe to prepare for his endurance racing efforts with Toyota.

DAMS saw both of their drivers leaving F2, with Ayumu Iwasa returning to Japan to compete in the Super Formula Championship with Team Mugen and Arthur Leclerc moving to the Italian GT Championship. The team fielded an all-American driver lineup in 2024, consisting of Jak Crawford, who moved over from Hitech Pulse-Eight after coming 13th in the championship in 2023, and Juan Manuel Correa, who left Van Amersfoort Racing after coming 19th in his first year since returning after his accident in 2019.

Invicta Racing also had an all-new driver lineup, after Amaury Cordeel and Jack Doohan departed the team, with the former joining Hitech Pulse-Eight and the latter focusing on his reserve driver work for Alpine in Formula One. Invicta's 2024 lineup consisted of reigning FIA Formula 3 Champion and McLaren junior Gabriel Bortoleto, partnered by Alpine junior Kush Maini, who switched from Campos Racing after coming eleventh with the team last season.

MP Motorsport saw Jehan Daruvala leave the team ahead of the 2023 season finale after four seasons in the series to join Maserati MSG Racing for Season 10 of the Formula E World Championship. The team fielded Williams Driver Academy member Franco Colapinto during the final round of 2023, and he stayed at the team for his first full-time F2 season, graduating after coming fourth with the team in FIA Formula 3.

Both Van Amersfoort Racing drivers moved to other teams, with Juan Manuel Correa signing for DAMS and Richard Verschoor joining Trident. VAR enlisted Enzo Fittipaldi, who left Rodin to embark on his third full season in the championship. Rafael Villagómez partnered him, graduating from the team's FIA F3 outfit after three seasons that culminated a 25th-place finish for his 2023 campaign.

Hitech Pulse-Eight also saw both their drivers switch teams, with Jak Crawford moving to DAMS and Isack Hadjar switching to Campos Racing. They were replaced by Paul Aron, who already made his debut at the final round of 2023 with Trident after coming third in the 2023 FIA Formula 3 Championship, and Amaury Cordeel, who left Invicta Racing to embark on his third season in the championship after previously finishing 17th and 20th.

Campos Racing driver Ralph Boschung ended his racing career after seven seasons in Formula 2, whilst his 2023 teammate Kush Maini moved to Invicta for his sophomore season. The team replaced the two with an all-Red Bull junior lineup in 2024, consisting of Pepe Martí, who graduated from the outfit's FIA Formula 3 team after coming fifth in 2023, and Isack Hadjar, who moved over from Hitech Pulse-Eight after coming 14th in 2023.

Trident saw Richard Verschoor return to the team for his fourth F2 campaign after last racing for them in 2022. He replaced Clément Novalak, who had already left the team ahead of the last round of 2024 to focus on competing in the 2024 European Le Mans Series with Inter Europol Competition.

PHM AIX Racing saw another long-term F2 driver leave the series, with Roy Nissany stepping away from the championship after six years of competition. He was replaced by Joshua Dürksen, who mirrored Antonelli in stepping up directly from the Formula Regional European Championship, albeit after competing there for two seasons and taking a single podium. Josh Mason did also not return to the team, with Taylor Barnard being named as his replacement. He graduated to Formula 2 after a race-winning campaign with Jenzer Motorsport in FIA Formula 3, where he finished tenth in the championship.

==== Mid-season changes ====
Franco Colapinto was promoted to the Williams F1 Team ahead of the Italian Grand Prix to replace Logan Sargeant for the rest of the season, ending his rookie Formula 2 campaign with four rounds to go. He was replaced at MP Motorsport by Oliver Goethe, a Red Bull Junior Team driver graduating from the FIA Formula 3 Championship. Similarly, Taylor Barnard, who was the reserve and development driver for McLaren in Formula E, was promoted as a full-time driver for the 2024–25 season and subsequently left AIX Racing. He was replaced by Indy NXT driver Niels Koolen for the Monza and Baku rounds.

Three driver changes took place for round 12 at the Baku City Circuit: Oliver Bearman missed the round to replace the race-banned Kevin Magnussen at Haas in Formula One. He was replaced by FIA Formula 3 runner-up Gabriele Minì. Roman Staněk left Trident after being unhappy with the team's performance. Christian Mansell, who finished the FIA Formula 3 season in fifth, replaced him. ART Grand Prix driver Zak O'Sullivan announced his departure from the team, citing funding issues. He was replaced by fellow Williams Academy Driver Luke Browning for the remainder of the season.

Four drivers left the series ahead of the penultimate round in Qatar. Juan Manuel Correa was replaced by Ferrari junior Dino Beganovic at DAMS Lucas Oil, Enzo Fittipaldi left Van Amersfoort Racing and was replaced by 2024 GB3 runner up driver John Bennett, and Dennis Hauger prioritised preparing for his upcoming Indy NXT campaign and left MP Motorsport. Richard Verschoor departed Trident to join MP Motorsport in place of Hauger, with Max Esterson replacing him at Trident and making his Formula 2 debut after coming 21st in FIA Formula 3 earlier in the year. AIX Racing signed Cian Shields, who finished 30th in FIA Formula 3, to contest the final two rounds in the No. 25 entry previously piloted by Barnard and Koolen.

Zane Maloney departed Rodin Motorsport ahead of the final round at Yas Marina as he moved to Lola Yamaha ABT in Formula E, which started its 2024–25 season at the same weekend. Reigning FIA Formula 3 Champion Leonardo Fornaroli replaced him ahead of a full-time graduation in 2025 with Invicta Racing.

== Race calendar ==
Round	Circuit	Sprint race	Feature race
1	Bahrain International Circuit, Sakhir	1 March	2 March
2	(Saudi Arabia) Jeddah Corniche Circuit, Jeddah	8 March	9 March
3	(Australia) Albert Park Circuit, Melbourne	23 March	24 March
4	(Italy) Imola Circuit, Imola	18 May	19 May
5	Circuit de Monaco, Monaco	25 May	26 May
6	(Spain) Circuit de Barcelona-Catalunya, Montmeló	22 June	23 June
7	(Austria) Red Bull Ring, Spielberg	29 June	30 June
8	(United Kingdom) Silverstone Circuit, Silverstone	6 July	7 July
9	(Hungary) Hungaroring, Mogyoród	20 July	21 July
10	(Belgium) Circuit de Spa-Francorchamps, Stavelot	27 July	28 July
11	(Italy) Monza Circuit, Monza	31 August	1 September
12	(Azerbaijan) Baku City Circuit, Baku	14 September	15 September
13	(Qatar) Lusail International Circuit, Lusail	30 November	1 December
14	(United Arab Emirates) Yas Marina Circuit, Abu Dhabi	7 December	8 December

=== Calendar changes ===
- The Formula 2 Championship returned to Imola after the round in 2023 was cancelled as a result of mass flooding which affected the region.
- Formula 2 made its debut in Qatar, supporting the Qatar Grand Prix at the Lusail International Circuit.
- The round at Circuit Zandvoort, supporting the Dutch Grand Prix, was removed from the calendar.

== Regulation changes ==
=== Technical regulations ===
- The season saw the introduction of a brand new chassis and engine package. The Dallara F2 2018 chassis, which had been used by Formula 2 since the 2018 season, was replaced by the new Dallara F2 2024 chassis, which was adapted to the current concept of a Formula One car. Like last season, a turbocharged 3.4-litre V6 Mecachrome engine was used, albeit being an evolution of the previous one.
- Formula 2 ran with 55% sustainable fuel supplied by Aramco in 2023. An increase in sustainability was implemented for 2024 to continue working towards the usage of 100% sustainable fuel by 2027.

=== Sporting regulations ===
From this season onwards, a new rule in order to try and prevent drivers benefitting from causing red flags during qualifying sessions was brought in for both the Formula 2 and FIA Formula 3 championships. Thus, if the stewards deemed a driver to be the sole cause for the issuing of a red flag, the driver responsible would have their fastest lap time of that session deleted, as well as being prevented from taking any further part in that session.

== Season report ==
=== Round 1: Bahrain ===
Kush Maini set the fastest qualifying time for the opening round at Bahrain International Circuit, but was later disqualified from the results for a technical infringement. Gabriel Bortoleto therefore inherited feature race pole position. Jak Crawford qualified tenth to start the reverse-grid sprint race from first place. ART Grand Prix drivers Victor Martins and Zak O'Sullivan gained places to run second and third in the opening laps, but would later drop outside the podium positions. In the following laps, eighth-place starter Zane Maloney made overtakes to take second place by lap six, and passed Crawford for the lead two laps later. Maloney held the position for the remainder of the race to claim his first Formula 2 race win. The podium was completed by Crawford and Pepe Martí, who started eleventh and claimed a podium finish on his Formula 2 debut.

Pole-sitter Bortoleto immediately fell to third place at the start of the feature race behind Isack Hadjar and Maloney, who improved from third to first. Bortoleto then collided with Hadjar at the first corner, causing Bortoleto to lose further positions and to take a penalty. Hadjar was then hit by Enzo Fittipaldi, eliminating both drivers from the race and necessitating the deployment of the safety car. The safety car was later deployed again to recover Victor Martins's broken-down car. Maloney maintained his lead during the restarts to claim victory in consecutive races. Martí and Paul Aron, both of whom started outside the top ten, finished second and third respectively. Maloney's double victory placed him first in the Drivers' Championship at the end of the round, 12 points ahead of second-placed Martí.

=== Round 2: Saudi Arabia ===
Oliver Bearman set the fastest qualifying time at the Jeddah Corniche Circuit, but later withdrew from the round to replace Carlos Sainz Jr. at Ferrari for the remainder of the Saudi Arabian Grand Prix. Kush Maini inherited feature race pole position as the second-fastest qualifier. Paul Aron started the sprint race from first place and maintained his position at the start. The safety car was deployed on the opening lap when Victor Martins hit the wall and retired. Aron was overtaken for the lead by Richard Verschoor on lap 8, and again by Dennis Hauger for second place with three laps remaining. Verschoor crossed the line first, but was later disqualified from the results along with Trident teammate Roman Staněk for a technical violation, promoting Hauger to victory and Enzo Fittipaldi to the podium. Championship leader Zane Maloney, who had qualified 15th, improved to fourth in the race.

At the start of the feature race, pole-sitter Maini held his lead, and a poor start from third-placed Martins allowed Fittipaldi to move up into the podium positions. The safety car was deployed shortly afterwards to recover the collided cars of Pepe Martí and Roman Staněk. Fittipaldi gained a place on Jak Crawford during the early pit stops, and later overtook Maini for the net race lead. On lap 16, damage from contact with the wall forced Franco Colapinto into retirement. The resultant safety car allowed Amaury Cordeel, who started 20th, to make his pit stop and retain his position at the front. He held on to a podium position until the final corner of the final lap, when fifth-placed Hauger passed him and Crawford to claim third. Fittipaldi's victory was his second in the category, and promoted him to second in the Drivers' Championship, 15 points behind leader Maloney.

=== Round 3: Australia ===
Dennis Hauger took his first pole position in Formula 2 in Melbourne ahead of Andrea Kimi Antonelli and Richard Verschoor. At the start of the sprint race, a collision between Isack Hadjar, Pepe Martí and Gabriel Bortoleto immediately off the start line eliminated the latter two. Hadjar then took the lead from sprint pole-sitter Roman Staněk at the first corner before the safety car was deployed. After racing resumed, a group of cars challenged Staněk for second place before Antonelli and Verschoor both spun out and Paul Aron damaged his front wing, causing another safety car period. Hauger, who started tenth, overtook Kush Maini on the penultimate lap to claim the final podium position. Hadjar crossed the finish line first but was later judged to have caused the first-lap crash. He received a 10-second time penalty, promoting Staněk to the top step of the podium, which marked his first win and podium finish in Formula 2.

Antonelli overtook Hauger for the lead of the feature race on the opening lap, but Hauger reclaimed the position shortly afterwards. Maini, who started fourth, soon passed both drivers to claim first place. Most of the top ten then made pit stops to shed their soft-compound tyres, with the exception of Maini, who started on the harder compound, and eighth-placed Hadjar. Pole-sitter Hauger crashed on his lap out of the pits, causing a safety car deployment. This allowed Hadjar to make his pit stop and emerge ahead of all drivers who had pitted. Hadjar took the lead when Maini made his pit stop and claimed his first victory of the season, with the podium completed by Aron and Maloney, who made overtakes after their pit stops. Maloney held his lead of the Drivers' Championship, 15 points ahead of Aron.

=== Round 4: Italy (Imola) ===
After three consecutive race retirements, Gabriel Bortoleto took pole position at Imola Circuit ahead of Oliver Bearman and Isack Hadjar. Amaury Cordeel started the sprint race from first place. On the first lap, Paul Aron took the lead from his teammate as a collision between Franco Colapinto, Roman Staněk, and Hadjar into the first corner led to several other incidents and eliminated the latter two, as well as Dennis Hauger, Enzo Fittipaldi, and Joshua Dürksen, necessitating the deployment of the safety car. Cordeel was overtaken for second place by Colapinto on lap 7, and again by Zane Maloney for the final podium position with three laps remaining. Aron held on to first place until the final lap, where he was passed by Colapinto around the outside at Tamburello corner. Colapinto claimed the fastest lap and his first Formula 2 race win.

A slow start from pole-sitter Bortoleto dropped him to fourth place at the start of the feature race behind Bearman, Hadjar and Dürksen. During the early pit stops, race leader Bearman stalled and dropped outside of the points, and Bortoleto regained a position from Dürksen. Later in the race, Cordeel and Pepe Martí were eliminated after their wheels were fitted improperly and detached in the pit lane. Hadjar crossed the finish line to win a second consecutive feature race. He was followed by Bortoleto, who claimed his first Formula 2 podium, and Dürksen, who achieved his team's first points finish since 2022. Maloney retained the lead of the Drivers' Championship, with his advantage cut to five points over Aron.

=== Round 5: Monaco ===
Richard Verschoor took his maiden pole position in Formula 2 at the Circuit de Monaco, and Victor Martins set the fastest time in the second group to qualify second. Taylor Barnard started the sprint race from first place. Two safety car periods were called in the early laps; firstly when contact broke Martins's front wing at the first corner, causing him to hit the wall, and secondly when Pepe Martí crashed on lap six. With six laps remaining, contact involving championship leader Maloney, Zak O'Sullivan and Juan Manuel Correa caused Maloney to spin and Kush Maini to stall in avoidance, blocking the track and causing the race to be red-flagged. Barnard maintained his lead through both safety cars and after the race was resumed to take his first victory and points finish in Formula 2.

Pole-sitter Verschoor led at the start of the feature race and a slow start from Martins allowed Hadjar and Aron into second and third, respectively. Verschoor reported power issues on lap 19 and began to lose positions before eventually retiring. In the closing laps, 15th-place starter O'Sullivan was the only driver yet to pit in anticipation of a safety car. A virtual safety car came with two laps remaining when Joshua Dürksen collided with Maloney whilst exiting the pits, allowing O'Sullivan to change tyres and emerge ahead of Hadjar to claim his first Formula 2 victory. Podium finishes for Hadjar and Aron promoted them ahead of Maloney in the Drivers' Championship, with Aron leading by two points.

=== Round 6: Spain ===
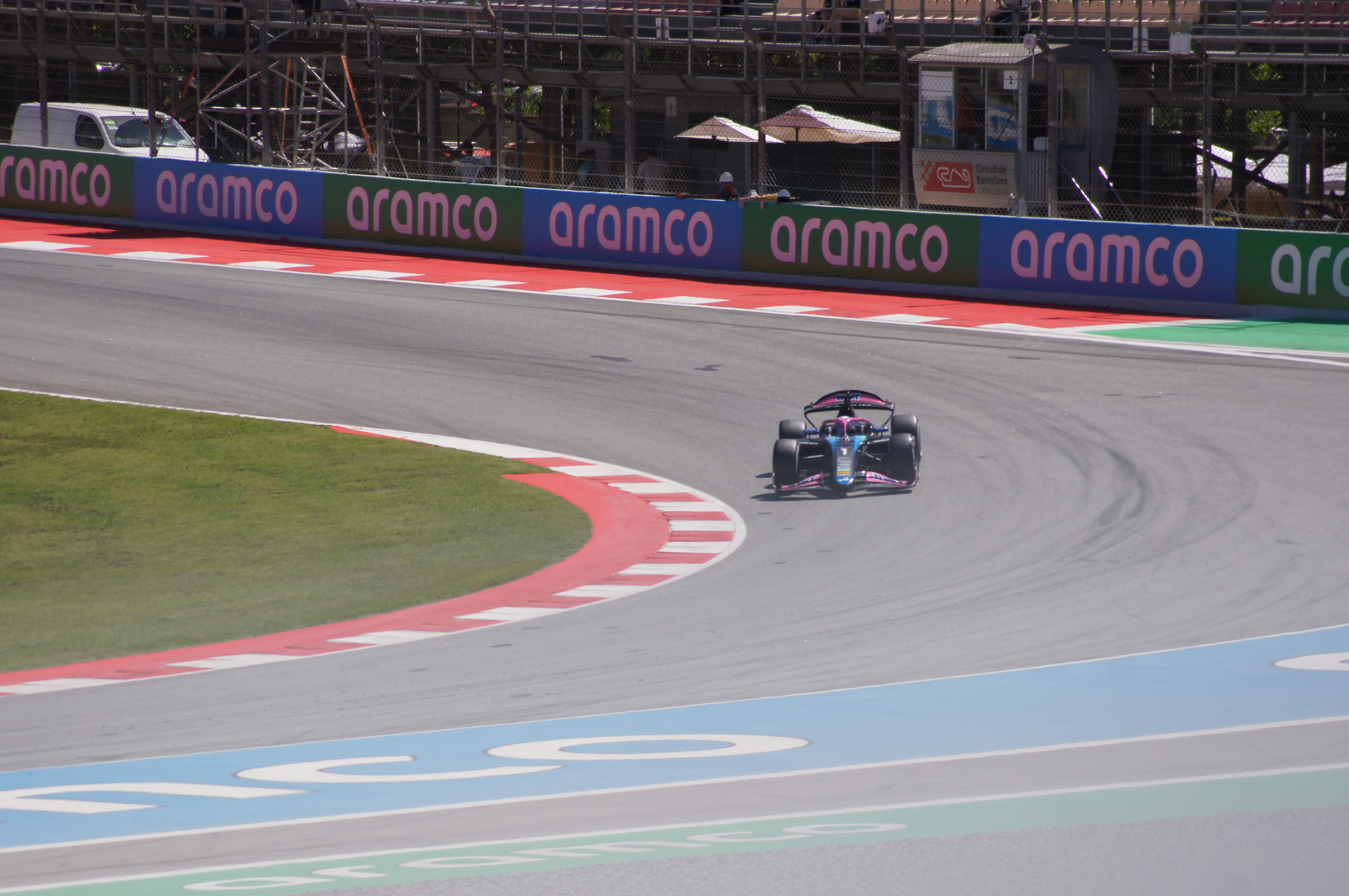
Victor Martins, winner of the sprint race in the Barcelona round.

Paul Aron, the championship leader at the time, achieved his first Formula 2 pole position in qualifying at the Circuit de Barcelona-Catalunya, followed by Jak Crawford and Franco Colapinto. Kush Maini started the sprint race from first place. Off the start line, Maini dropped positions and allowed Victor Martins into the lead, and Ritomo Miyata improved from fourth to second. Martins led the rest of the race distance to achieve his first podium finish of the season. Miyata received a time penalty during the race for track limit violations, demoting him from the podium and promoting Maini and Juan Manuel Correa to second and third, respectively. Post-race, seven more drivers, including Correa, were issued track limit penalties, allowing Aron to take the final podium place.

On lap one of the feature race, a collision between Martins and Dennis Hauger eliminated both drivers, which brought out the safety car. Pole-sitter Aron maintained his lead at the start and safety car restart ahead of Crawford and Colapinto, but was overtaken by Crawford shortly after the pit stop phase and lost further positions from a mistake that caused him to go through the gravel. Joshua Dürksen's car, which now led the race by virtue of having yet to pit, then broke down, causing a virtual safety car period and allowing Correa into the lead. After all drivers made their pit stops, Crawford claimed his first feature race victory in Formula 2, followed by Colapinto. The podium was completed by Correa, who made overtakes after his pit stop and passed Aron for third place to achieve his first Formula 2 podium finish since 2019. At the end of the round, Aron had extended his Drivers' Championship advantage to nine points over Isack Hadjar.

=== Round 7: Austria ===
Dennis Hauger set his second pole position of the season in qualifying at the Red Bull Ring, ahead of Joshua Dürksen and Gabriel Bortoleto. Kush Maini started on pole position in the sprint race, but lost positions to Oliver Bearman and Pepe Martí at the start. Paul Aron, who started sixth, made his way into third place by lap 21. Bearman finished first to claim his first win and podium of the season, followed by Martí and Aron.

Maini, Jak Crawford and pole-sitter Hauger stalled on the formation lap prior to the feature race, leaving Dürksen as the first driver on the grid. Dürksen was overtaken by Bortoleto and Franco Colapinto in the early laps. Martí, who started eighth, illegally made his pit stop under virtual safety car conditions and emerged in front of Bortoleto, but was overtaken by Bortoleto and Hadjar and later was penalised for the pit stop infringement. Colapinto pitted for soft-compound tyres late in the race and used them to make his way up to second place. Bortoleto took his first Formula 2 victory and was joined on the podium by Colapinto and Hadjar. After the round, Aron's championship advantage had increased to 11 points over Hadjar.

=== Round 8: United Kingdom ===
Isack Hadjar put it on pole, with Martins and Hauger in second and third. The top three starters for the sprint race consisted of Andrea Kimi Antonelli, Maloney, and Maini. They maintained those positions until the end of the race, despite Maini getting overtaken by teammate Bortoleto on the last lap, for which the latter was penalised as he completed the overtake off-track. Victor Martins fought for a podium during the race, but he retired after being spun by his teammate Zak O'Sullivan. Antonelli set a winning margin of 8 seconds on the way to his first win of the season in heavy rain. Championship contenders Aron and Hadjar both crashed out of the race on lap 8.

Hadjar had a bad start off the line in the feature race, with Victor Martins and Oliver Bearman overtaking him. Contact on lap 1 between Antonelli and Maini led to a safety car, as well as a collision between Joshua Dürksen and Paul Aron, for which the latter was penalised. During the pit stop sequence, Jak Crawford received a 5-second time penalty for an unsafe release, which led to him being relegated from first position on track to third, with Hadjar and Maloney inheriting first and second place at the flag, respectively. Hadjar's win promoted him to the championship lead, 16 points ahead of Aron, who failed to score points in a round for the first time this season.

=== Round 9: Hungary ===
Paul Aron took pole position, with Fittipaldi and Hadjar qualifying in second and third, respectively. Richard Verschoor started the sprint from first place. In the sprint race, Verschoor briefly lost the lead to Andrea Kimi Antonelli, but he regained it after a mistake from Antonelli to take his fourth win in Formula 2, ahead of Maini and Victor Martins. However, Verschoor was disqualified due to his car's plank being thinner than allowed by the regulations. Therefore, Kush Maini inherited the win.

In the feature race, Aron lost first place due to making a mistake going into turn one. Victor Martins took the advantage to take the lead. Soon after, Antonelli passed Maloney but then a safety car was brought out after the latter was hit by Paul Aron. Antonelli took advantage of this safety car period to make his mandatory pit stop, putting him into the lead. Later in the race, another safety car was brought out due to Amaury Cordeel hitting the barrier, which gave Antonelli another chance to pit for fresh tyres. With this tyre advantage, Antonelli cruised to his first feature race victory of the season.

=== Round 10: Belgium ===
Aron took his third pole position of the season at the Circuit de Spa-Francorchamps, in front of Bortoleto and Hadjar. The sprint race was set back by four hours from its original starting time because of heavy rain on the circuit. Just three laps into the race, Pepe Martí stopped on the circuit, bringing out the Safety Car for two laps and a red flag. The race was not resumed, and reverse pole sitter O'Sullivan won the race by default. As only three racing laps had been completed, the points awarded were reduced; this meant only the top five finishers - O'Sullivan, Hauger, Verschoor, Maloney and Crawford - scored points in the race.

At the start of the feature race, Maloney, Bearman and Martí were involved in a multi-car collision, forcing the latter two to retire from the race and bringing out the safety car. Franco Colapinto also retired on the first lap due to an engine issue, ending his last race in his rookie Formula 2 season before he would go up to compete in Formula One with Williams for the rest of the season. Briefly after racing resumed on lap four, Victor Martins and Rafael Villagómez crashed, once again deploying the Safety Car for another three laps. On the final lap, Aron suffered a mechanical issue and stopped on track, dropping him out of the points. Hadjar went on to win his fourth feature race of the year, with Bortoleto and Crawford finishing second and third. This would also be the last round that race winner Taylor Barnard participated in as he would vacate his slot at AIX Racing in preparation for a switch to Formula E.

=== Round 11: Italy (Monza) ===
Maloney took pole position at the Monza Circuit in a qualifying session that saw Bortoleto spin out, forcing him to start both races in last position. At the beginning of the sprint race, Colapinto's replacement, Oliver Goethe, got taken out at the start before the first corner in a multi-car crash. After the safety car restart, reverse pole-sitter Fittipaldi locked up, which saw him being overtaken by Martí, Bearman and Martins. Martí himself locked up later in the race, allowing Bearman to take the lead and hold onto it until the end to take his second win of the season, ahead of Martins and Dürksen. Further back, Aron was tagged by Maloney, dropping him out of the points, while Bortoleto and Hauger finished in a dead heat for eighth place; the stewards decided to split the one point awarded for that position between the two.

In the feature race, Aron was again taken out after being tagged by Martí on the run up to the first corner. The safety car was called out on lap eight after Hauger was tagged by Ritomo Miyata and retired. This was beneficial for all drivers who were yet to take their mandatory pitstop - most notably Bortoleto, who moved to sixth in the shuffle of drivers. Within the first six laps of the restart beginning on lap 11, Bortoleto made his way to first, and built up a gap to second-placed Maloney to become the first driver in the championship's history to win a race starting from last. As Hadjar failed to score any points across the weekend, Bortoleto managed to shrink his championship lead to 10.5 points with three rounds remaining. This would be the last round in the championship for Zak O'Sullivan and Roman Staněk, with O'Sullivan sitting out the rest of the year due to funding issues and Staněk leaving Trident after being unhappy with the car's performance.

=== Round 12: Azerbaijan ===
Both of the Tridents secured pole position for both races at the Baku City Circuit; Richard Verschoor for the feature race and Formula 2 debutant Christian Mansell for the sprint race. Mansell held on to the lead until lap seven, when he lost it to Gabriele Minì, the temporary replacement for Oliver Bearman; the latter once again having to make a substitution in the Azerbaijan Grand Prix in Formula One. Joshua Dürksen passed both Mansell and Minì for first place by lap 13, as Mansell eventually drop to eighth after struggling with his tyres. Dürksen never relinquished the lead after, and took the first victory of his Formula 2 campaign and the first for a Paraguayan driver in Formula 2 history. Jak Crawford followed in second, and Minì held off Victor Martins on the last lap to take a podium on his Formula 2 debut.

At the start of the feature race, Kush Maini failed to set his car to the right starting procedure and caused a huge pileup that involved Pepe Martí, Oliver Goethe, Rafael Villagómez and debutant Niels Koolen. After a lengthy red flag period, the race was forced to run under a time limit, and when Minì crashed out with less than four minutes of racing, the race ended under a safety car after just seventeen laps were completed. Verschoor finally took a valid victory after his last two disqualifications, which would turn out to be his final race with Trident before moving to MP Motorsport with two rounds remaining. Martins and Andrea Kimi Antonelli followed behind Verschoor, while Gabriel Bortoleto in fourth took the championship lead away from Isack Hadjar, who failed to score after locking up during the race. It would be the last round in the championship for Hauger, Juan Manuel Correa, Enzo Fittipaldi, and Koolen.

=== Round 13: Qatar ===
Paul Aron took his fourth pole of the season at the Lusail International Circuit, while Bearman returned from Formula One to take reverse grid pole for the sprint. In the early stages of the sprint, Hadjar took the lead from Bearman on a softer tyre compound and built a gap ahead of him, but gradually started lapping slower than Bearman as the tyres degraded. Bearman passed Hadjar with three laps remaining, and Hadjar spun shortly after. He dropped to fourth behind Crawford and Verschoor, and the safety car was deployed seconds after when Maini and Antonelli collided. Bearman won the race from Crawford and Verschoor, while Hadjar only outscored rival Bortoleto by two points as Bortoleto finished sixth.

In the feature race, Bortoleto surged into the lead off the start. He planned to make his mandatory pit stop on lap eight, but backed out after a safety car was called when Antonelli once again retired on track; this time with the result of Verschoor colliding with him in the pit lane. However, as Bortoleto crossed over the pit entry to avoid entering the pit lane, he was investigated and later given a five-second time penalty, with Aron and Hadjar close by. Because of this, Bortoleto asked teammate Maini - who was shuffled in front of him as a result of the safety car - to hold up Aron and Hadjar so he could escape with the victory, but Maini pitted the next lap and left Bortoleto to fend for himself. He failed to escape the window of a victory, and Aron inherited his first Formula 2 win ahead of Hadjar and Bortoleto. Hadjar brought himself to just half a point behind Bortoleto heading into the season finale, while Aron remained in mathematical championship contention.

=== Round 14: United Arab Emirates ===
Martins took the final pole of the season at the Yas Marina Circuit, while Amaury Cordeel took reverse grid pole for the sprint. At the start, Martí leaped into the race lead, while Hadjar sustained damage as a result of a collision between Maini and Miyata. He would eventually get past Miyata, but found himself stuck behind new driver Dino Beganovic for the rest of the race, even as the two moved up the field together. Martí took his first win in the series with Bortoleto second, meaning that Aron was eliminated from the championship fight; he was eventually disqualified after coming in third. Beganovic inherited his first podium in the series after a time penalty for fourth-placed Bearman, and Hadjar could only salvage fifth, expanding the gap to four points.

At the start of the feature race, Hadjar immediately stalled on the grid and rejoined two laps down, abruptly ending most of his chances for winning the championship. Meanwhile, Bortoleto took the lead and held onto it until Dürksen passed him after their round of pit stops. There were however no real issues standing in his way, and even though Dürksen would eventually win the final race of the year, Gabriel Bortoleto was crowned the 2024 FIA Formula 2 Champion, the first rookie to win the title since Oscar Piastri in 2021, and subsequently helped Invicta Racing secure the Teams' Championship title, the first for Virtuosi Racing since 2017, when the British outfit ran Russian Time.

== Results and standings ==
=== Season summary ===
Round		Circuit	Pole position	Fastest lap	Winning driver	Winning team	Report
1	SR	Bahrain International Circuit		(Brazil) Enzo Fittipaldi (Note: Enzo Fittipaldi set the fastest lap but did not finish in the top ten, so he was ineligible to score the point for it. Zane Maloney scored the point for setting the fastest lap among those finishing in the top ten.)	(Barbados) Zane Maloney	(New Zealand) Rodin Motorsport	Report
1	FR	Bahrain International Circuit	(Brazil) Gabriel Bortoleto (Note: Kush Maini set the fastest time in qualifying, but was later disqualified due to his left undertray front external strake being below the required minimum height. Gabriel Bortoleto was promoted to pole position in his place.)	(Norway) Dennis Hauger	(Barbados) Zane Maloney	(New Zealand) Rodin Motorsport	Report
2	SR	(Saudi Arabia) Jeddah Corniche Circuit		(Estonia) Paul Aron	(Norway) Dennis Hauger (Note: Richard Verschoor originally won the race, but was later disqualified as his team installed an incorrect throttle pedal progressivity map on his car. Dennis Hauger, initially classified second, inherited the win.)	(Netherlands) MP Motorsport	Report
2	FR	(Saudi Arabia) Jeddah Corniche Circuit	(India) Kush Maini (Note: Oliver Bearman set the fastest time in qualifying, but later withdrew from the sprint and feature races to compete in the Saudi Arabian Grand Prix in Formula One. Kush Maini was promoted to pole position in his place.)	(Brazil) Enzo Fittipaldi	(Brazil) Enzo Fittipaldi	(Netherlands) Van Amersfoort Racing	Report
3	SR	(Australia) Albert Park Circuit		(France) Isack Hadjar	(Czech Republic) Roman Staněk (Note: Isack Hadjar originally won the race, but later received a ten-second time penalty for causing a collision at the race start. Roman Staněk, initially classified second, inherited the win.)	(Italy) Trident	Report
3	FR	(Australia) Albert Park Circuit	(Norway) Dennis Hauger	(United States) Jak Crawford	(France) Isack Hadjar	(Spain) Campos Racing	Report
4	SR	(Italy) Imola Circuit		(Argentina) Franco Colapinto	(Argentina) Franco Colapinto	(Netherlands) MP Motorsport	Report
4	FR	(Italy) Imola Circuit	(Brazil) Gabriel Bortoleto	(France) Victor Martins	(France) Isack Hadjar	(Spain) Campos Racing	Report
5	SR	Circuit de Monaco		(Italy) Andrea Kimi Antonelli	(United Kingdom) Taylor Barnard	(Germany) AIX Racing	Report
5	FR	Circuit de Monaco	(Netherlands) Richard Verschoor	(Norway) Dennis Hauger	(United Kingdom) Zak O'Sullivan	(France) ART Grand Prix	Report
6	SR	(Spain) Circuit de Barcelona-Catalunya		(Japan) Ritomo Miyata	(France) Victor Martins	(France) ART Grand Prix	Report
6	FR	(Spain) Circuit de Barcelona-Catalunya	(Estonia) Paul Aron	(Italy) Andrea Kimi Antonelli (Note: Andrea Kimi Antonelli set the fastest lap but did not finish in the top ten, so he was ineligible to score the point for it. Pepe Martí scored the point for setting the fastest lap among those finishing in the top ten.)	(United States) Jak Crawford	(France) DAMS Lucas Oil	Report
7	SR	(Austria) Red Bull Ring		(Japan) Ritomo Miyata (Note: Ritomo Miyata set the fastest lap but did not finish in the top ten, so he was ineligible to score the point for it. Paul Aron scored the point for setting the fastest lap among those finishing in the top ten.)	(United Kingdom) Oliver Bearman	(Italy) Prema Racing	Report
7	FR	(Austria) Red Bull Ring	(Norway) Dennis Hauger	(Argentina) Franco Colapinto	(Brazil) Gabriel Bortoleto	(United Kingdom) Invicta Racing	Report
8	SR	(United Kingdom) Silverstone Circuit		(Italy) Andrea Kimi Antonelli	(Italy) Andrea Kimi Antonelli	(Italy) Prema Racing	Report
8	FR	(United Kingdom) Silverstone Circuit	(France) Isack Hadjar	(Argentina) Franco Colapinto	(France) Isack Hadjar	(Spain) Campos Racing	Report
9	SR	(Hungary) Hungaroring		(Brazil) Gabriel Bortoleto (Note: Gabriel Bortoleto set the fastest lap but did not finish in the top ten, so he was ineligible to score the point for it. Richard Verschoor originally scored the point for setting the fastest lap among those finishing in the top ten, but was later disqualified as the rear plank of his car was below the minimum thickness required. Isack Hadjar, initially having the second-fastest lap inside the top ten, inherited the point.)	(India) Kush Maini (Note: Richard Verschoor originally won the race, but was later disqualified as the rear plank of his car was below the minimum thickness required. Kush Maini, initially classified second, inherited the win.)	(United Kingdom) Invicta Racing	Report
9	FR	(Hungary) Hungaroring	(Estonia) Paul Aron	(Italy) Andrea Kimi Antonelli	(Italy) Andrea Kimi Antonelli	(Italy) Prema Racing	Report
10	SR	(Belgium) Circuit de Spa-Francorchamps		(United Kingdom) Zak O'Sullivan (Note: Zak O'Sullivan set the fastest lap of the race, but as less than 50% of the scheduled race distance was completed, he was not awarded the point for it.)	(United Kingdom) Zak O'Sullivan	(France) ART Grand Prix	Report
10	FR	(Belgium) Circuit de Spa-Francorchamps	(Estonia) Paul Aron	(Estonia) Paul Aron (Note: Paul Aron set the fastest lap but did not finish in the top ten, so he was ineligible to score the point for it. Gabriel Bortoleto scored the point for setting the fastest lap among those finishing in the top ten.)	(France) Isack Hadjar	(Spain) Campos Racing	Report
11	SR	(Italy) Monza Circuit		(France) Victor Martins	(United Kingdom) Oliver Bearman	(Italy) Prema Racing	Report
11	FR	(Italy) Monza Circuit	(Barbados) Zane Maloney	(India) Kush Maini (Note: Kush Maini set the fastest lap but did not finish in the top ten, so he was ineligible to score the point for it. Joshua Dürksen scored the point for setting the fastest lap among those finishing in the top ten.)	(Brazil) Gabriel Bortoleto	(United Kingdom) Invicta Racing	Report
12	SR	(Azerbaijan) Baku City Circuit		(Netherlands) Richard Verschoor (Note: Richard Verschoor set the fastest lap but did not finish in the top ten, so he was ineligible to score the point for it. Joshua Dürksen scored the point for setting the fastest lap among those finishing in the top ten.)	(Paraguay) Joshua Dürksen	(Germany) AIX Racing	Report
12	FR	(Azerbaijan) Baku City Circuit	(Netherlands) Richard Verschoor	(Brazil) Gabriel Bortoleto	(Netherlands) Richard Verschoor	(Italy) Trident	Report
13	SR	(Qatar) Lusail International Circuit		(Netherlands) Richard Verschoor	(United Kingdom) Oliver Bearman	(Italy) Prema Racing	Report
13	FR	(Qatar) Lusail International Circuit	(Estonia) Paul Aron	(United Kingdom) Oliver Bearman (Note: Oliver Bearman set the fastest lap but did not finish in the top ten, so he was ineligible to score the point for it. Paul Aron scored the point for setting the fastest lap among those finishing in the top ten.)	(Estonia) Paul Aron	(United Kingdom) Hitech Pulse-Eight	Report
14	SR	(United Arab Emirates) Yas Marina Circuit		(France) Victor Martins (Note: Victor Martins set the fastest lap but did not finish in the top ten, so he was ineligible to score the point for it. Pepe Martí scored the point for setting the fastest lap among those finishing in the top ten.)	(Spain) Pepe Martí	(Spain) Campos Racing	Report
14	FR	(United Arab Emirates) Yas Marina Circuit	(France) Victor Martins	(Netherlands) Richard Verschoor	(Paraguay) Joshua Dürksen	(Germany) AIX Racing	Report

=== Scoring system ===
Points were awarded to the top eight classified finishers in the sprint race, and to the top ten classified finishers in the feature race. The pole-sitter in the feature race also received two points, and one point was given to the driver who set the fastest lap in both the feature and sprint races, provided that driver finished inside the top ten. If the driver who set the fastest lap was classified outside the top ten, the point was given to the driver who set the fastest lap of those inside the top ten. No extra points were awarded to the pole-sitter in the sprint race as the grid for it was set by reversing the top ten qualifiers.

Sprint race points

Points were awarded to the top eight classified finishers, excluding the fastest lap point which was given to the top ten classified finishers.

Position	1st	2nd	3rd	4th	5th	6th	7th	8th	FL
Points	10	8	6	5	4	3	2	1	1

Feature race points

Points were awarded to the top ten classified finishers. Bonus points were awarded to the pole-sitter and to the driver who set the fastest lap and finished in the top ten.

Position	1st	2nd	3rd	4th	5th	6th	7th	8th	9th	10th	Pole	FL
Points	25	18	15	12	10	8	6	4	2	1	2	1

=== Drivers' Championship standings ===
Pos.	Driver	BHR (Bahrain)		JED (Saudi Arabia)		ALB (Australia)		IMO (Italy)		MON (Monaco)		CAT (Spain)		RBR (Austria)		SIL (United Kingdom)		HUN (Hungary)		SPA (Belgium)		MNZ (Italy)		BAK (Azerbaijan)		LUS (Qatar)		YAS (United Arab Emirates)		Points
Pos.	Driver	SR	FR	SR	FR	SR	FR	SR	FR	SR	FR	SR	FR	SR	FR	SR	FR	SR	FR	SR (Note: As more than 25% but less than 50% of the scheduled race distance was completed, reduced points were awarded on a 5–4–3–2–1 basis to the top five finishers.)	FR	SR (Note: Gabriel Bortoleto and Dennis Hauger finished the race in a dead heat. As a result, both drivers are classified in eighth place, splitting up the point for that position with each receiving half a point.)	FR	SR	FR (Note: As more than 50% but less than 75% of the scheduled race distance was completed, reduced points were awarded on a 19–14–12–10–8–6–4–3–2–1 basis to the top ten finishers.)	SR	FR	SR	FR	Points
1	(Brazil) Gabriel Bortoleto	6	5^{P}	10	Ret	Ret	Ret	6	2^{P}	2	8	5	10	4	1	4	6	16	4	10	2^{F}	8	1	5	4^{F}	5	3	2	2	214.5
2	(France) Isack Hadjar	4	Ret	15†	Ret	6^{F}	1	Ret	1	8	2	6	5	13	3	Ret	1^{P}	3^{F}	18	9	1	10	11	12	14	4	2	5	19	192
3	(Estonia) Paul Aron	5	3	2^{F}	10	18	2	2	6	7	3	3	4^{P}	3^{F}	5	Ret	12	6	Ret^{P}	18	16†^{P}	20	Ret	6	6	7	1^{P F}	DSQ	11	163
4	(Barbados) Zane Maloney	1^{F}	1	4	7	10	3	3	11	Ret	10	20	7	17	Ret	2	2	13	Ret	4	6	5	2^{P}	10	15	6	9			140
5	(United States) Jak Crawford	2	Ret	5	4	9	10^{F}	14	7	13	Ret	4	1	6	10	6	3	9	17	5	3	6	9	2	8	2	Ret	8	Ret	125
6	(Italy) Andrea Kimi Antonelli	14	10	6	6	Ret	4	10	4	4^{F}	7	15	12	15	13	1^{F}	Ret	14	1^{F}	6	9	18	4	7	3	19†	Ret	WD	WD	113
7	(France) Victor Martins	11	Ret	Ret	11	7	8	12	9^{F}	Ret	9	1	Ret	10	11	Ret	5	2	2	12	Ret	2^{F}	6	4	2	9	NC	19	4^{P}	107
8	(Netherlands) Richard Verschoor	10	14	DSQ	8	Ret	6	7	10	16	Ret^{P}	13	18†	20	Ret	11	13	DSQ	3	3	5	14	3	17	1^{P}	3^{F}	17	7	3^{F}	106
9	(Argentina) Franco Colapinto	18	6	11	Ret	4	DSQ	1^{F}	5	5	13	18	2	11	2^{F}	5	4^{F}	5	13	8	Ret									96
10	(Paraguay) Joshua Dürksen	15	11	9	12	17	Ret	Ret	3	18	18†	10	Ret	8	6	16	Ret	18	19	19	10	3	5^{F}	1^{F}	5	8	13	Ret	1	87
11	(Norway) Dennis Hauger	8	8^{F}	1	3	2	Ret^{P}	Ret	12	3	6^{F}	12	Ret	5	12^{P}	7	9	4	6	2	12	8	Ret	14	9					85.5
12	(United Kingdom) Oliver Bearman	16	15	WD	WD	14	9	5	19	11	4	21	14	1	Ret	Ret	7	10	15	7	Ret	1	7			1	12	4	5	75
13	(India) Kush Maini	13	7	8	2^{P}	3	12	8	14	Ret	17	2	6	7	17	3	19	1	7	13	15	11	15	9	DSQ	20†	14	17	12	74
14	(Spain) Pepe Martí	3	2	7	Ret	Ret	13	16	Ret	Ret	14	11	9^{F}	2	15	Ret	10	17	12	Ret	Ret	4	12	19	Ret	Ret	16	1^{F}	6	62
15	(Brazil) Enzo Fittipaldi	17	Ret	3	1^{F}	12	17	Ret	17	9	12	16	11	14	4	13	8	21	5	14	Ret	7	10	13	11					61
16	(United Kingdom) Zak O'Sullivan	7	4	16†	Ret	8	Ret	9	13	10	1	9	15	9	9	Ret	11	19	14	1	4	Ret	13							59
17	(Belgium) Amaury Cordeel	Ret	Ret	Ret	5	16	11	4	Ret	14	Ret	14	8	18	7	15	15	20	Ret	11	8	12	18	18	12	16	7	13	8	39
18	(United States) Juan Manuel Correa	12	Ret	Ret	14	11	14	15	8	12	5	8	3	16	14	12	20	8	16	17	11	17	Ret	15	Ret					31
19	(Japan) Ritomo Miyata	9	9	12	15	5	5	13	15	17	15	7^{F}	13	22	Ret	10	17	12	8	15	7	13	14	Ret	13	13	10	11	10	31
20	(Sweden) Dino Beganovic																									10	5	3	7	22
21	(United Kingdom) Taylor Barnard	Ret	16	13	13	13	16	DSQ	20	1	11	19	Ret	12	8	9	14	7	9	16	13									18
22	(Czech Republic) Roman Staněk	Ret	13	DSQ	Ret	1	15	Ret	18	6	16	22	17	21	18	8	18	15	11	20	14	15	17							14
23	(Germany) Oliver Goethe																					Ret	16	21	Ret	Ret	4	9	9	14
24	(Mexico) Rafael Villagómez	19	12	14	9	15	7	11	16	15	Ret	17	16	19	16	14	16	11	10	21	Ret	16	8	16	Ret	17	Ret	12	Ret	13
25	(Australia) Christian Mansell																							8	10	15	6	16	16	10
26	(United Kingdom) Luke Browning																							11	7	11	15	6	15	7
27	(Italy) Gabriele Minì																							3	Ret					6
28	(United Kingdom) John Bennett																									12	8	15	14	4
29	(Italy) Leonardo Fornaroli																											10	13	0
30	(United Kingdom) Cian Shields																									18	11	18	18	0
31	(United States) Max Esterson																									14	18	14	17	0
32	(Netherlands) Niels Koolen																					19	19	20	Ret					0
Pos.	Driver	SR	FR	SR	FR	SR	FR	SR	FR	SR	FR	SR	FR	SR	FR	SR	FR	SR	FR	SR	FR	SR	FR	SR	FR	SR	FR	SR	FR	Points
Pos.	Driver	BHR (Bahrain)		JED (Saudi Arabia)		ALB (Australia)		IMO (Italy)		MON (Monaco)		CAT (Spain)		RBR (Austria)		SIL (United Kingdom)		HUN (Hungary)		SPA (Belgium)		MNZ (Italy)		BAK (Azerbaijan)		LUS (Qatar)		YAS (United Arab Emirates)		Points

Key
Colour	Result
Gold	Winner
Silver	Second place
Bronze	Third place
Green	Other points position
Blue	Other classified position
Blue	Not classified, finished (NC)
Purple	Not classified, retired (Ret)
Red	Did not qualify (DNQ)
Black	Disqualified (DSQ)
White	Did not start (DNS)
White	Race cancelled (C)
Blank	Did not practice (DNP)
Blank	Excluded (EX)
Blank	Did not arrive (DNA)
Blank	Withdrawn (WD)
Blank	Did not enter (empty cell)
Annotation	Meaning
P	Pole position
F	Fastest lap

Notes:

- † – Driver did not finish the race, but was classified as he completed more than 90% of the race distance.

=== Teams' Championship standings ===
Pos.	Team	BHR (Bahrain)		JED (Saudi Arabia)		ALB (Australia)		IMO (Italy)		MON (Monaco)		CAT (Spain)		RBR (Austria)		SIL (United Kingdom)		HUN (Hungary)		SPA (Belgium)		MNZ (Italy)		BAK (Azerbaijan)		LUS (Qatar)		YAS (United Arab Emirates)		Points
Pos.	Team	SR	FR	SR	FR	SR	FR	SR	FR	SR	FR	SR	FR	SR	FR	SR	FR	SR	FR	SR	FR	SR	FR	SR	FR	SR	FR	SR	FR	Points
1	(United Kingdom) Invicta Racing	6	5^{P}	8	2^{P}	3	12	6	2^{P}	2	8	2	6	4	1	3	6	1	4	10	2^{F}	8	1	5	4^{F}	5	3	2	2	288.5
1	(United Kingdom) Invicta Racing	13	7	10	Ret	Ret	Ret	8	14	Ret	17	5	10	7	17	4	19	16	7	13	15	11	15	9	DSQ	20†	14	17	12	288.5
2	(Spain) Campos Racing	3	2	7	Ret	6^{F}	1	16	1	8	2	6	5	2	3	Ret	1^{P}	3^{F}	12	9	1	4	11	12	14	4	2	1^{F}	6	254
2	(Spain) Campos Racing	4	Ret	15†	Ret	Ret	13	Ret	Ret	Ret	14	11	9^{F}	13	15	Ret	10	17	18	Ret	Ret	10	12	19	Ret	Ret	16	5	19	254
3	(Netherlands) MP Motorsport	8	6	1	3	2	Ret^{P}	1^{F}	5	3	6^{F}	12	2	5	2^{F}	5	4^{F}	4	6	2	12	8	16	14	9	3^{F}	4	7	3^{F}	220.5
3	(Netherlands) MP Motorsport	18	8^{F}	11	Ret	4	DSQ	Ret	12	5	13	18	Ret	11	12^{P}	7	9	5	13	8	Ret	Ret	Ret	21	Ret	Ret	17	9	9	220.5
4	(United Kingdom) Hitech Pulse-Eight	5	3	2^{F}	5	16	2	2	6	7	3	3	4^{P}	3^{F}	5	15	12	6	Ret^{P}	11	8	12	18	6	6	7	1^{P F}	13	8	202
4	(United Kingdom) Hitech Pulse-Eight	Ret	Ret	Ret	10	18	11	4	Ret	14	Ret	14	8	18	7	Ret	15	20	Ret	18	16†^{P}	20	Ret	18	12	16	7	DSQ	11	202
5	(Italy) Prema Racing	14	10	6	6	14	4	5	4	4^{F}	4	15	12	1	13	1^{F}	7	10	1^{F}	6	9	1	4	3	3	1	12	4	5	194
5	(Italy) Prema Racing	16	15	WD	WD	Ret	9	10	19	11	7	21	14	15	Ret	Ret	Ret	14	15	7	Ret	18	7	7	Ret	19†	Ret	WD	WD	194
6	(France) DAMS Lucas Oil	2	Ret	5	4	9	10^{F}	14	7	12	5	4	1	6	10	6	3	8	16	5	3	6	9	2	8	2	5	3	7	178
6	(France) DAMS Lucas Oil	12	Ret	Ret	14	11	14	15	8	13	Ret	8	3	16	14	12	20	9	17	17	11	17	Ret	15	Ret	10	Ret	8	Ret	178
7	(France) ART Grand Prix	7	4	16†	11	7	8	9	9^{F}	10	1	1	15	9	9	Ret	5	2	2	1	4	2^{F}	6	4	2	9	15	6	4^{P}	173
7	(France) ART Grand Prix	11	Ret	Ret	Ret	8	Ret	12	13	Ret	9	9	Ret	10	11	Ret	11	19	14	12	Ret	Ret	13	11	7	11	NC	19	15	173
8	(New Zealand) Rodin Motorsport	1^{F}	1	4	7	5	3	3	11	17	10	7^{F}	7	17	Ret	2	2	12	8	4	6	5	2^{P}	10	13	6	9	10	10	171
8	(New Zealand) Rodin Motorsport	9	9	12	15	10	5	13	15	Ret	15	20	13	22	Ret	10	17	13	Ret	15	7	13	14	Ret	15	13	10	11	13	171
9	(Germany) PHM AIX Racing (1–3) (Germany) AIX Racing (4–14)	15	11	9	12	13	16	Ret	3	1	11	10	Ret	8	6	9	14	7	9	16	10	3	5^{F}	1^{F}	5	8	11	18	1	105
9	(Germany) PHM AIX Racing (1–3) (Germany) AIX Racing (4–14)	Ret	16	13	13	17	Ret	DSQ	20	18	18†	19	Ret	12	8	16	Ret	18	19	19	13	19	19	20	Ret	18	13	Ret	18	105
10	(Italy) Trident	10	13	DSQ	8	1	6	7	10	6	16	13	17	20	18	8	13	15	3	3	5	14	3	8	1^{P}	14	6	14	16	105
10	(Italy) Trident	Ret	14	DSQ	Ret	Ret	15	Ret	18	16	Ret^{P}	22	18†	21	Ret	11	18	DSQ	11	20	14	15	17	17	10	15	18	16	17	105
11	(Netherlands) Van Amersfoort Racing	17	12	3	1^{F}	12	7	11	16	9	12	16	11	14	4	13	8	11	5	14	Ret	7	8	13	11	12	8	12	14	78
11	(Netherlands) Van Amersfoort Racing	19	Ret	14	9	15	17	Ret	17	15	Ret	17	16	19	16	14	16	21	10	21	Ret	16	10	16	Ret	17	Ret	15	Ret	78
Pos.	Team	SR	FR	SR	FR	SR	FR	SR	FR	SR	FR	SR	FR	SR	FR	SR	FR	SR	FR	SR	FR	SR	FR	SR	FR	SR	FR	SR	FR	Points
Pos.	Team	BHR (Bahrain)		JED (Saudi Arabia)		ALB (Australia)		IMO (Italy)		MON (Monaco)		CAT (Spain)		RBR (Austria)		SIL (United Kingdom)		HUN (Hungary)		SPA (Belgium)		MNZ (Italy)		BAK (Azerbaijan)		LUS (Qatar)		YAS (United Arab Emirates)		Points

Key
Colour	Result
Gold	Winner
Silver	Second place
Bronze	Third place
Green	Other points position
Blue	Other classified position
Blue	Not classified, finished (NC)
Purple	Not classified, retired (Ret)
Red	Did not qualify (DNQ)
Black	Disqualified (DSQ)
White	Did not start (DNS)
White	Race cancelled (C)
Blank	Did not practice (DNP)
Blank	Excluded (EX)
Blank	Did not arrive (DNA)
Blank	Withdrawn (WD)
Blank	Did not enter (empty cell)
Annotation	Meaning
P	Pole position
F	Fastest lap

Notes:

- † – Driver did not finish the race, but was classified as he completed more than 90% of the race distance.
- Rows are not related to the drivers: within each team, individual race standings are sorted purely based on the final classification in the race (not by total points scored in the event, which includes points awarded for fastest lap and pole position).
