= 2024 Imola Formula 2 round =

Motor racing event

(Italy) 2024 Imola Formula 2 round
Round details
- Round 4 of 14 in the 2024 FIA Formula 2 Championship.
- Location: Autodromo Internazionale Enzo e Dino Ferrari; Imola, Emilia-Romagna, Italy
- Course: Permanent racing facility 4.909 km (3.050 mi)

Sprint Race
- Date: 18 May 2024
- Laps: 25
Podium
First	(Argentina) Franco Colapinto	MP Motorsport
Second	(Estonia) Paul Aron	Hitech Pulse-Eight
Third	(Barbados) Zane Maloney	Rodin Motorsport
Fastest lap
Driver	(Argentina) Franco Colapinto	MP Motorsport
- Time: 1:30.352 (on lap 12)

Feature Race
- Date: 19 May 2024
- Laps: 35
Pole position
Driver	(Brazil) Gabriel Bortoleto	Invicta Racing
Time	1:27.056	
Podium
First	(France) Isack Hadjar	Campos Racing
Second	(Brazil) Gabriel Bortoleto	Invicta Racing
Third	(Paraguay) Joshua Dürksen	AIX Racing
Fastest lap
Driver	(France) Victor Martins	ART Grand Prix
- Time: 1:29.580 (on lap 34)

The 2024 Imola FIA Formula 2 round was a motor racing event held between 16 and 19 May 2024 at the Autodromo Internazionale Enzo e Dino Ferrari. It was the fourth round of the 2024 FIA Formula 2 Championship and was held in support of the 2024 Emilia Romagna Grand Prix.

== Classification ==
=== Qualifying ===
Qualifying was held on 17 May 2024, at 16:00 local time (UTC+2).

Pos.	No.	Driver	Entrant	Time/Gap	Grid SR	Grid FR
1	10	(Brazil) Gabriel Bortoleto	Invicta Racing	1:27.056	10	1
2	3	(United Kingdom) Oliver Bearman	Prema Racing	+0.055	8	2
3	20	(France) Isack Hadjar	Campos Racing	+0.216	7	3
4	4	(Italy) Andrea Kimi Antonelli	Prema Racing	+0.264	6	4
5	24	(Paraguay) Joshua Dürksen	AIX Racing	+0.328	9^{1}	5
6	5	(Barbados) Zane Maloney	Rodin Motorsport	+0.372	5	6
7	23	(Czech Republic) Roman Staněk	Trident	+0.411	4	7
8	17	(Estonia) Paul Aron	Hitech Pulse-Eight	+0.419	3	8
9	12	(Argentina) Franco Colapinto	MP Motorsport	+0.558	2	9
10	16	(Belgium) Amaury Cordeel	Hitech Pulse-Eight	+0.607	1	10
11	14	(Brazil) Enzo Fittipaldi	Van Amersfoort Racing	+0.683	11	11
12	25	(United Kingdom) Taylor Barnard	AIX Racing	+0.718	12	12
13	11	(Norway) Dennis Hauger	MP Motorsport	+0.739	13	13
14	21	(Spain) Pepe Martí	Campos Racing	+0.746	14	14
15	22	(Netherlands) Richard Verschoor	Trident	+0.830	15	15
16	6	(Japan) Ritomo Miyata	Rodin Motorsport	+0.994	16	16
17	9	(India) Kush Maini	Invicta Racing	+1.005	17	17
18	2	(United Kingdom) Zak O'Sullivan	ART Grand Prix	+1.072	18	18
19	15	(Mexico) Rafael Villagómez	Van Amersfoort Racing	+1.075	19	19
20	8	(United States) Juan Manuel Correa	DAMS Lucas Oil	+1.136	20	20
21	7	(United States) Jak Crawford	DAMS Lucas Oil	+1.227	22^{2}	21
22	1	(France) Victor Martins	ART Grand Prix	+1.513	21	22
107% time: 1:33.150 (+6.094)

Notes

- ^1 – Joshua Dürksen received a 3-place grid penalty for the Sprint Race for causing a collision in the previous round.
- ^2 – Zak O'Sullivan received a 5-place grid penalty for the Sprint Race for causing a collision in the previous round.

=== Sprint race ===
The sprint race was held on 18 May 2024, at 14:15 local time (UTC+2).

Pos.	No.	Driver	Entrant	Laps	Time/Retired	Grid	Points
1	12	(Argentina) Franco Colapinto	MP Motorsport	25	41:43.964	2	10 (1)
2	17	(Estonia) Paul Aron	Hitech Pulse-Eight	25	+1.706	3	8
3	5	(Barbados) Zane Maloney	Rodin Motorsport	25	+6.618	5	6
4	16	(Belgium) Amaury Cordeel	Hitech Pulse-Eight	25	+8.173	1	5
5	3	(United Kingdom) Oliver Bearman	Prema Racing	25	+11.125	8	4
6	10	(Brazil) Gabriel Bortoleto	Invicta Racing	25	+11.589	10	3
7	22	(Netherlands) Richard Verschoor	Trident	25	+14.254	15	2
8	9	(India) Kush Maini	Invicta Racing	25	+16.330	17	1
9	2	(United Kingdom) Zak O'Sullivan	ART Grand Prix	25	+17.427	22	
10	4	(Italy) Andrea Kimi Antonelli	Prema Racing	25	+18.286	6	
11	15	(Mexico) Rafael Villagómez	Van Amersfoort Racing	25	+18.960	18	
12	1	(France) Victor Martins	ART Grand Prix	25	+19.396	21	
13	6	(Japan) Ritomo Miyata	Rodin Motorsport	25	+19.788	16	
14	7	(United States) Jak Crawford	DAMS Lucas Oil	25	+20.089	20	
15	8	(United States) Juan Manuel Correa	DAMS Lucas Oil	25	+20.587	19	
16	21	(Spain) Pepe Martí	Campos Racing	25	+55.602	14	
DNF	23	(Czech Republic) Roman Staněk	Trident	0	Collision	4	
DNF	20	(France) Isack Hadjar	Campos Racing	0	Collision	7	
DNF	24	(Paraguay) Joshua Dürksen	AIX Racing	0	Collision	9	
DNF	14	(Brazil) Enzo Fittipaldi	Van Amersfoort Racing	0	Collision	11	
DNF	11	(Norway) Dennis Hauger	MP Motorsport	0	Collision	13	
DSQ	25	(United Kingdom) Taylor Barnard	AIX Racing	25	Disqualified^{1}	12	
Fastest lap set by (Argentina) Franco Colapinto: 1:30.352 (lap 12)

Notes

- ^1 – Taylor Barnard originally finished seventh, but was later disqualified as his car was found to have not engaged the race start set-up procedure, a breach of Art 1.5.2 of the FIA Formula 2 Technical Regulations.

=== Feature race ===
The feature race was held on 19 May 2024, at 10:00 local time (UTC+2).

Isack Hadjar won back-to-back Feature Races from pole-sitter Bortoleto. The podium was completed by Joshua Dürksen, who gave his team, AIX Racing, their first ever Formula 2 podium while also becoming the first Paraguayan driver both to score points and to achieve a top 3 finish in Formula 2.

Pos.	No.	Driver	Entrant	Laps	Time/Retired	Grid	Points
1	20	(France) Isack Hadjar	Campos Racing	35	54:01.509	3	25
2	10	(Brazil) Gabriel Bortoleto	Invicta Racing	35	+0.569	1	18 (2)
3	24	(Paraguay) Joshua Dürksen	AIX Racing	35	+13.736	5	15
4	4	(Italy) Andrea Kimi Antonelli	Prema Racing	35	+18.034	4	12
5	12	(Argentina) Franco Colapinto	MP Motorsport	35	+18.489	9	10
6	17	(Estonia) Paul Aron	Hitech Pulse-Eight	35	+18.815	8	8
7	7	(United States) Jak Crawford	DAMS Lucas Oil	35	+20.737	21	6
8	8	(United States) Juan Manuel Correa	DAMS Lucas Oil	35	+21.240	20	4
9	1	(France) Victor Martins	ART Grand Prix	35	+28.364	22	2 (1)
10	22	(Netherlands) Richard Verschoor	Trident	35	+33.507	15	1
11	5	(Barbados) Zane Maloney	Rodin Motorsport	35	+34.107	6	
12	11	(Norway) Dennis Hauger	MP Motorsport	35	+34.346	13	
13	2	(United Kingdom) Zak O'Sullivan	ART Grand Prix	35	+37.657	18	
14	9	(India) Kush Maini	Invicta Racing	35	+37.957	17	
15	6	(Japan) Ritomo Miyata	Rodin Motorsport	35	+38.402	16	
16	15	(Mexico) Rafael Villagómez	Van Amersfoort Racing	35	+42.357	19	
17	14	(Brazil) Enzo Fittipaldi	Van Amersfoort Racing	35	+43.055	11	
18	23	(Czech Republic) Roman Staněk	Trident	35	+43.575	7	
19	3	(United Kingdom) Oliver Bearman	Prema Racing	35	+44.017	2	
20	25	(United Kingdom) Taylor Barnard	AIX Racing	35	+44.786	12	
DNF	16	(Belgium) Amaury Cordeel	Hitech Pulse-Eight	30	Loose wheel	10	
DNF	21	(Spain) Pepe Martí	Campos Racing	30	Loose wheel	14	
Fastest lap set by (France) Victor Martins: 1:29.580 (lap 34)

== Standings after the event ==
Drivers' Championship standings

	Pos.	Driver	Points
	1	(Barbados) Zane Maloney	68
	2	(Estonia) Paul Aron	63
1	3	(France) Isack Hadjar	59
1	4	(Norway) Dennis Hauger	41
7	5	(Brazil) Gabriel Bortoleto	38

Teams' Championship standings

	Pos.	Team	Points
1	1	(Spain) Campos Racing	85
1	2	(New Zealand) Rodin Motorsport	84
	3	(United Kingdom) Hitech Pulse-Eight	78
	4	(Netherlands) MP Motorsport	75
	5	(United Kingdom) Invicta Racing	72

- Note: Only the top five positions are included for both sets of standings.

== See also ==
- 2024 Emilia Romagna Grand Prix
- 2024 Imola Formula 3 round

Previous round: 2024 Melbourne Formula 2 round	FIA Formula 2 Championship; 2024 season	Next round: 2024 Monte Carlo Formula 2 round
Previous round: 2022 Imola Formula 2 round	Imola Formula 2 round	Next round: 2025 Imola Formula 2 round
