= 2024 Monte Carlo Formula 2 round =

Fifth round of the 2024 Formula 2 season

(Monaco) 2024 Monte Carlo Formula 2 round
Round details
- Round 5 of 14 in the 2024 FIA Formula 2 Championship.
- Location: Circuit de Monaco; Monte Carlo, Monaco
- Course: Street Circuit; 3.337 km (2.074 mi)

Sprint Race
- Date: 25 May 2024
- Laps: 30
Podium
First	(United Kingdom) Taylor Barnard	AIX Racing
Second	(Brazil) Gabriel Bortoleto	Invicta Racing
Third	(Norway) Dennis Hauger	MP Motorsport
Fastest lap
Driver	(Italy) Andrea Kimi Antonelli	Prema Racing
- Time: 1:22.333 (on lap 30)

Feature Race
- Date: 26 May 2024
- Laps: 42
Pole position
Driver	(Netherlands) Richard Verschoor	Trident
Time	1:21.283	
Podium
First	(United Kingdom) Zak O'Sullivan	ART Grand Prix
Second	(France) Isack Hadjar	Campos Racing
Third	(Estonia) Paul Aron	Hitech Grand Prix
Fastest lap
Driver	(Norway) Dennis Hauger	MP Motorsport
- Time: 1:22.384 (on lap 37)

The 2024 Monte Carlo FIA Formula 2 round was a motor racing event held between 23 and 26 May 2024 at the Circuit de Monaco, Monte Carlo, Monaco. It was the fifth round of the 2024 FIA Formula 2 Championship and was held in support of the 2024 Monaco Grand Prix.

== Classification ==
=== Qualifying ===
==== Group A ====
Qualifying for Group A was held on 24 May 2024, at 15:10 local time (UTC+2).

Pos.	No.	Driver	Team	Time	Gap	Grid
1	22	(Netherlands) Richard Verschoor	Trident	1:21.283	–	1
2	20	(France) Isack Hadjar	Campos Racing	1:21.440	+0.157	3
3	12	(Argentina) Franco Colapinto	MP Motorsport	1:21.655	+0.372	5
4	4	(Italy) Andrea Kimi Antonelli	Prema Racing	1:21.669	+0.386	7
5	10	(Brazil) Gabriel Bortoleto	Invicta Racing	1:21.670	+0.387	9
6	14	(Brazil) Enzo Fittipaldi	Van Amersfoort Racing	1:21.723	+0.440	11
7	8	(United States) Juan Manuel Correa	DAMS Lucas Oil	1:21.771	+0.488	13
8	2	(United Kingdom) Zak O'Sullivan	ART Grand Prix	1:21.985	+0.702	15
9	16	(Belgium) Amaury Cordeel	Hitech Pulse-Eight	1:22.219	+0.936	17
10	24	(Paraguay) Joshua Dürksen	AIX Racing	1:22.387	+1.104	19
107% time: 1:26.972 (+5.689)
—	6	(Japan) Ritomo Miyata	Rodin Motorsport	1:27.498	+6.215	22^{1}

Notes:

- ^1 – Ritomo Miyata failed to set a time within the 107%-rule, but was later given permission by the stewards to start both races from the back of the grid.

==== Group B ====
Qualifying for Group B was held on 24 May 2024, at 15:34 local time (UTC+2).

Pos.	No.	Driver	Team	Time	Gap	Grid
1	1	(France) Victor Martins	ART Grand Prix	1:21.310	–	2
2	17	(Estonia) Paul Aron	Hitech Pulse-Eight	1:21.347	+0.037	4
3	23	(Czech Republic) Roman Staněk	Trident	1:21.466	+0.156	6
4	11	(Norway) Dennis Hauger	MP Motorsport	1:21.659	+0.349	8
5	25	(United Kingdom) Taylor Barnard	AIX Racing	1:21.831	+0.521	10
6	3	(United Kingdom) Oliver Bearman	Prema Racing	1:21.919	+0.609	12
7	5	(Barbados) Zane Maloney	Rodin Motorsport	1:21.941	+0.631	14
8	9	(India) Kush Maini	Invicta Racing	1:21.988	+0.678	16
9	7	(United States) Jak Crawford	DAMS Lucas Oil	1:22.030	+0.720	18
10	21	(Spain) Pepe Martí	Campos Racing	1:22.226	+0.916	20
107% time: 1:27.001 (+5.691)
—	15	(Mexico) Rafael Villagómez	Van Amersfoort Racing	1:40.365	+19.055	21^{2}

Notes:

- ^2 – Rafael Villagómez failed to set a time within the 107%-rule, but was later given permission by the stewards to start both races from the back of the grid.

=== Sprint Race ===
The Sprint race was held on 25 May 2024, at 14:15 local time (UTC+2).

Pos.	No.	Driver	Entrant	Laps	Time/Retired	Grid	Points
1	25	(United Kingdom) Taylor Barnard	AIX Racing	30	1:04:20.946	1	10
2	10	(Brazil) Gabriel Bortoleto	Invicta Racing	30	+5.246	2	8
3	11	(Norway) Dennis Hauger	MP Motorsport	30	+5.817	3	6
4	4	(Italy) Andrea Kimi Antonelli	Prema Racing	30	+8.213	4	5 (1)
5	12	(Argentina) Franco Colapinto	MP Motorsport	30	+10.857	6	4
6	23	(Czech Republic) Roman Staněk	Trident	30	+13.594	5	3
7	17	(Estonia) Paul Aron	Hitech Pulse-Eight	30	+15.085	7	2
8	20	(France) Isack Hadjar	Campos Racing	30	+16.495	8	1
9	14	(Brazil) Enzo Fittipaldi	Van Amersfoort Racing	30	+16.890	11	
10	2	(United Kingdom) Zak O'Sullivan	ART Grand Prix	30	+17.752	13	
11	3	(United Kingdom) Oliver Bearman	Prema Racing	30	+18.334	15^{1}	
12	8	(United States) Juan Manuel Correa	DAMS Lucas Oil	30	+18.830	16^{1}	
13	7	(United States) Jak Crawford	DAMS Lucas Oil	30	+19.225	17	
14	16	(Belgium) Amaury Cordeel	Hitech Pulse-Eight	30	+22.049	14	
15	15	(Mexico) Rafael Villagómez	Van Amersfoort Racing	30	+24.054	21	
16	22	(Netherlands) Richard Verschoor	Trident	30	+24.327	10	
17	6	(Japan) Ritomo Miyata	Rodin Motorsport	30	+25.203	22	
18	24	(Paraguay) Joshua Dürksen	AIX Racing	30	+25.915	18	
DNF	5	(Barbados) Zane Maloney	Rodin Motorsport	22	Collision/Spun off	12	
DNF	9	(India) Kush Maini	Invicta Racing	22	Stalled	19^{1}	
DNF	21	(Spain) Pepe Martí	Campos Racing	4	Accident	20	
DNF	1	(France) Victor Martins	ART Grand Prix	0	Collision	9	
Fastest lap set by (Italy) Andrea Kimi Antonelli: 1:22.333 (lap 30)

Notes:

- ^1 – Oliver Bearman, Juan Manuel Correa and Kush Maini all received a three-place grid penalty for impeding other drivers during Qualifying.

=== Feature Race ===
The Feature race was held on 26 May 2024, at 09:40 local time (UTC+2).

Pos.	No.	Driver	Entrant	Laps	Time/Retired	Grid	Points
1	2	(United Kingdom) Zak O'Sullivan	ART Grand Prix	42	1:00:25.696	15	25
2	20	(France) Isack Hadjar	Campos Racing	42	+0.580	3	18
3	17	(Estonia) Paul Aron	Hitech Pulse-Eight	42	+8.053	4	15
4	3	(United Kingdom) Oliver Bearman	Prema Racing	42	+9.118	12	12
5	8	(United States) Juan Manuel Correa	DAMS Lucas Oil	42	+9.586	13	10
6	11	(Norway) Dennis Hauger	MP Motorsport	42	+9.945	8	8 (1)
7	4	(Italy) Andrea Kimi Antonelli	Prema Racing	42	+17.540	7	6
8	10	(Brazil) Gabriel Bortoleto	Invicta Racing	42	+17.847	9	4
9	1	(France) Victor Martins	ART Grand Prix	42	+18.021	2	2
10	5	(Barbados) Zane Maloney	Rodin Motorsport	42	+26.555	14	1
11	25	(United Kingdom) Taylor Barnard	AIX Racing	42	+26.983	10	
12	14	(Brazil) Enzo Fittipaldi	Van Amersfoort Racing	42	+27.418	11	
13	12	(Argentina) Franco Colapinto	MP Motorsport	42	+30.213	5	
14	21	(Spain) Pepe Martí	Campos Racing	42	+31.662	20	
15	6	(Japan) Ritomo Miyata	Rodin Motorsport	42	+32.386	22	
16	23	(Czech Republic) Roman Staněk	Trident	42	+33.309	6	
17	9	(India) Kush Maini	Invicta Racing	42	+33.796	16	
Ret	24	(Paraguay) Joshua Dürksen	AIX Racing	39	Collision	19	
DNF	22	(Netherlands) Richard Verschoor	Trident	28	Driveshaft	1	(2)
DNF	15	(Mexico) Rafael Villagómez	Van Amersfoort Racing	18	Collision damage	21	
DNF	16	(Belgium) Amaury Cordeel	Hitech Pulse-Eight	6	Suspension	17	
DNF	7	(United States) Jak Crawford	DAMS Lucas Oil	0	Collision damage	18	
Fastest lap set by (Norway) Dennis Hauger: 1:22.384 (lap 37)

Notes:

- ^1 – Joshua Dürksen retired from the race, but was classified as he completed over 90% of the race distance.

== Standings after the event ==
Drivers' Championship standings

	Pos.	Driver	Points
1	1	(Estonia) Paul Aron	80
1	2	(France) Isack Hadjar	78
2	3	(Barbados) Zane Maloney	69
	4	(Norway) Dennis Hauger	56
	5	(Brazil) Gabriel Bortoleto	50

Teams' Championship standings

	Pos.	Team	Points
	1	(Spain) Campos Racing	104
1	2	(United Kingdom) Hitech Pulse-Eight	95
1	3	(Netherlands) MP Motorsport	94
2	4	(New Zealand) Rodin Motorsport	85
	5	(United Kingdom) Invicta Racing	84

- Note: Only the top five positions are included for both sets of standings.

== See also ==
- 2024 Monaco Grand Prix
- 2024 Monte Carlo Formula 3 round

== Notes ==
Previous round: 2024 Imola Formula 2 round	FIA Formula 2 Championship; 2024 season	Next round: 2024 Barcelona Formula 2 round
Previous round: 2023 Monte Carlo Formula 2 round	Monte Carlo Formula 2 round	Next round: 2025 Monte Carlo Formula 2 round
