= 2024 Spielberg Formula 2 round =

Motor racing event

(Austria) 2024 Spielberg Formula 2 round
Round details
- Round 7 of 14 in the 2024 FIA Formula 2 Championship.
- Location: Red Bull Ring, Spielberg, Styria, Austria
- Course: Permanent racing facility 4.318 km (2.683 mi)

Sprint Race
- Date: 29 June 2024
- Laps: 28
Podium
First	(United Kingdom) Oliver Bearman	Prema Racing
Second	(Spain) Pepe Martí	Campos Racing
Third	(Estonia) Paul Aron	Hitech Pulse-Eight
Fastest lap
Driver	(Japan) Ritomo Miyata	Rodin Motorsport
- Time: 1:18.708 (on lap 25)

Feature Race
- Date: 30 June 2024
- Laps: 40
Pole position
Driver	(Norway) Dennis Hauger	MP Motorsport
Time	1:15.487	
Podium
First	(Brazil) Gabriel Bortoleto	Invicta Racing
Second	(Argentina) Franco Colapinto	MP Motorsport
Third	(France) Isack Hadjar	Campos Racing
Fastest lap
Driver	(Argentina) Franco Colapinto	MP Motorsport
- Time: 1:17.868 (on lap 35)

The 2024 Spielberg Formula 2 round was a motor racing event held between 28 and 30 June 2024 at the Red Bull Ring. It was the seventh round of the 2024 Formula 2 Championship and was held in support of the 2024 Austrian Grand Prix.

== Classification ==
=== Qualifying ===
While Isack Hadjar was on top for the early stages of the session, an issue with his car resulted in him only being able to complete 7 laps. MP Motorsport's Dennis Hauger secured his second pole of the season ahead of Joshua Dürksen by only 8 thousandths of a second.

Pos.	No.	Driver	Entrant	Time	Grid SR	Grid FR
1	11	(Norway) Dennis Hauger	MP Motorsport	1:15.487	10	1
2	24	(Paraguay) Joshua Dürksen	AIX Racing	+0.008	9	2
3	10	(Brazil) Gabriel Bortoleto	Invicta Racing	+0.114	8	3
4	12	(Argentina) Franco Colapinto	MP Motorsport	+0.161	7	4
5	17	(Estonia) Paul Aron	Hitech Pulse-Eight	+0.234	6	5
6	25	(United Kingdom) Taylor Barnard	AIX Racing	+0.320	5	6
7	20	(France) Isack Hadjar	Campos Racing	+0.341	4	7
8	21	(Spain) Pepe Martí	Campos Racing	+0.406	3	8
9	3	(United Kingdom) Oliver Bearman	Prema Racing	+0.413	2	9
10	9	(India) Kush Maini	Invicta Racing	+0.424	1	10
11	16	(Belgium) Amaury Cordeel	Hitech Pulse-Eight	+0.433	11	11
12	2	(United Kingdom) Zak O'Sullivan	ART Grand Prix	+0.482	12	12
13	1	(France) Victor Martins	ART Grand Prix	+0.508	13	13
14	7	(United States) Jak Crawford	DAMS Lucas Oil	+0.520	14	14
15	14	(Brazil) Enzo Fittipaldi	Van Amersfoort Racing	+0.560	15	15
16	4	(Italy) Andrea Kimi Antonelli	Prema Racing	+0.671	16	16
17	22	(Netherlands) Richard Verschoor	Trident	+0.730	17	17
18	15	(Mexico) Rafael Villagómez	Van Amersfoort Racing	+0.783	18	18
19	8	(United States) Juan Manuel Correa	DAMS Lucas Oil	+0.803	19	19
20	5	(Barbados) Zane Maloney	Rodin Motorsport	+0.805	20	20
21	6	(Japan) Ritomo Miyata	Rodin Motorsport	+0.861	21	21
22	23	(Czech Republic) Roman Staněk	Trident	+0.975	22	22

=== Sprint race ===
Oliver Bearman took his first podium and win of the season at the Sprint Race, after having a better start than pole-sitter Kush Maini, who also lost a position to Pepe Martí during the first lap of the race after making a contact that broke the Spanish driver's front wing. During the first half of the race, Bearman built a strong advantage to Martí, who was then able to reduce the gap to less than a second.

Maini, who ran in third position for the majority of the race, started to struggle due to his defensive driving, eventually dropping to 7th place. Bearman was able to hold Martí off for the win, with championship leader Paul Aron completing the podium and taking an extra point for the fastest lap in the points-paying positions.

Pos.	No.	Driver	Entrant	Laps	Time/Retired	Grid	Points
1	3	(United Kingdom) Oliver Bearman	Prema Racing	28	37:22.959	2	10
2	21	(Spain) Pepe Martí	Campos Racing	28	+1.751	3	8
3	17	(Estonia) Paul Aron	Hitech Pulse-Eight	28	+3.003	6	6 (1)
4	10	(Brazil) Gabriel Bortoleto	Invicta Racing	28	+3.655	8	5
5	11	(Norway) Dennis Hauger	MP Motorsport	28	+11.030	10	4
6	7	(United States) Jak Crawford	DAMS Lucas Oil	28	+11.677	14	3
7	9	(India) Kush Maini	Invicta Virtuosi Racing	28	+13.703	1	2
8	24	(Paraguay) Joshua Dürksen	AIX Racing	28	+13.887	9	1
9	2	(United Kingdom) Zak O'Sullivan	ART Grand Prix	28	+15.866	12	
10	1	(France) Victor Martins	ART Grand Prix	28	+19.852	13	
11	12	(Argentina) Franco Colapinto	MP Motorsport	28	+21.546	7	
12	25	(United Kingdom) Taylor Barnard	AIX Racing	28	+22.305	5	
13	20	(France) Isack Hadjar	Campos Racing	28	+22.857	4	
14	14	(Brazil) Enzo Fittipaldi	Van Amersfoort Racing	28	+23.629	15	
15	4	(Italy) Andrea Kimi Antonelli	Prema Racing	28	+23.728	16	
16	8	(United States) Juan Manuel Correa	DAMS Lucas Oil	28	+26.445	19	
17	5	(Barbados) Zane Maloney	Rodin Motorsport	28	+27.184	20	
18	16	(Belgium) Amaury Cordeel	Hitech Pulse-Eight	28	+27.597	11	
19	15	(Mexico) Rafael Villagómez	Van Amersfoort Racing	28	+28.250	18	
20	22	(Netherlands) Richard Verschoor	Trident	28	+29.804	17	
21	23	(Czech Republic) Roman Staněk	Trident	28	+29.884	22	
22	6	(Japan) Ritomo Miyata	Rodin Motorsport	28	+46.914	21	
Fastest lap set by (Japan) Ritomo Miyata: 1:18.708 (lap 25)

=== Feature race ===
At the beginning of the formation lap, pole-sitter Dennis Hauger, Kush Maini and Jak Crawford stalled, being pushed to the pit lane for the race start and leaving their grid positions vacant. Paraguayan driver Joshua Dürksen was left as the virtual leader, but was not credited with the pole position. He led Gabriel Bortoleto and Franco Colapinto for the first laps of the race, but was overtaken by the Brazilian driver on lap 4 and by Colapinto on lap 5.

A virtual safety car was deployed on lap 6 as Zane Maloney, who had stalled his car at the race start, had an engine failure and had to stop his car. Pepe Martí had been advised to pit, but was 2 meters away from crossing the Safety Car line before the VSC was deployed, which resulted in a post-race investigation and penalty for the Spaniard.

Bortoleto, Dürksen, Aron and Hadjar all subsequently pitted and came out behind Martí for the virtual lead of the race. They squabbled, with Bortoleto taking the virtual lead from Martí, who let his Campos Racing teammate, Hadjar, through to a virtual second place to try to attack Bortoleto. Hadjar had struggled to overtake Aron, who was given a five-second penalty for moving under braking while defending against the Frenchman.

Fittipaldi and Colapinto, who had started the race with the harder available compound, drove long initial stints, only pitting on the last 10 laps. They came out of their pit stop 6th and 8th, respectively, with Dürksen in between them. With fresher supersoft tyres, they were able to charge through the pack, eventually finishing 6th and 2nd on the road, with the Argentine driver securing the fastest lap of the race, but not able to catch eventual winner, Gabriel Bortoleto, who won for the first time in Formula 2.

After Colapinto's late charge, the Campos drivers argued over the radio due to team orders, with Hadjar finally crossing the finish line ahead in third position. Martí and Aron finished fourth and fifth on track, but their penalties dropped them to 15th and 5th, respectively, with Fittipaldi inheriting the fourth position.

Pos.	No.	Driver	Entrant	Laps	Time/Retired	Grid	Points
1	10	(Brazil) Gabriel Bortoleto	Invicta Racing	40	53:59.322	3	25
2	12	(Argentina) Franco Colapinto	MP Motorsport	40	+4.296	4	18 (1)
3	20	(France) Isack Hadjar	Campos Racing	40	+5.553	7	15
4	14	(Brazil) Enzo Fittipaldi	Van Amersfoort Racing	40	+11.399	15	12
5	17	(Estonia) Paul Aron	Hitech Pulse-Eight	40	+11.437^{1}	5	10
6	24	(Paraguay) Joshua Dürksen	AIX Racing	40	+12.562	2	8
7	16	(Belgium) Amaury Cordeel	Hitech Pulse-Eight	40	+22.557	11	6
8	25	(United Kingdom) Taylor Barnard	AIX Racing	40	+27.634	6	4
9	2	(United Kingdom) Zak O'Sullivan	ART Grand Prix	40	+32.180	12	2
10	7	(United States) Jak Crawford	DAMS Lucas Oil	40	+32.224	PL^{4}	1
11	1	(France) Victor Martins	ART Grand Prix	40	+32.613	13	
12	11	(Norway) Dennis Hauger	MP Motorsport	40	+33.470	PL^{4}	(2)
13	4	(Italy) Andrea Kimi Antonelli	Prema Racing	40	+34.724	16	
14	8	(United States) Juan Manuel Correa	DAMS Lucas Oil	40	+35.143^{2}	19	
15	21	(Spain) Pepe Martí	Campos Racing	40	+36.035^{3}	8	
16	15	(Mexico) Rafael Villagómez	Van Amersfoort Racing	40	+49.792	18	
17	9	(India) Kush Maini	Invicta Racing	40	+51.433	PL^{4}	
18	23	(Czech Republic) Roman Staněk	Trident	40	+55.494	22	
DNF	6	(Japan) Ritomo Miyata	Rodin Motorsport	34		21	
DNF	22	(Netherlands) Richard Verschoor	Trident	21		17	
DNF	3	(United Kingdom) Oliver Bearman	Prema Racing	20	Engine	9	
DNF	5	(Barbados) Zane Maloney	Rodin Motorsport	4	Engine	20	
Fastest lap set by (Argentina) Franco Colapinto: 1:17.868 (lap 35)

Notes

- ^1 Paul Aron received a five-second time penalty for failing to leave enough space to Isack Hadjar.
- ^2 Juan Manuel Correa received a five-second time penalty for crossing the white line at pit entry.
- ^3 Pepe Martí finished fourth on track. He received a post-race ten-second stop and go penalty for pitting during a virtual safety car period. This was converted to a 30-second time penalty after the race which dropped him to 15th place.
- ^4 Dennis Hauger, Kush Maini and Jak Crawford all stalled at the beginning of the formation lap, being required to start from the pit lane. Their places on the grid (1st, 10th and 14th, respectively) were left vacant. Hauger was still credited with pole position and received two championship points.

== Standings after the event ==
Drivers' Championship standings

	Pos.	Driver	Points
	1	(Estonia) Paul Aron	117
	2	(France) Isack Hadjar	106
4	3	(Brazil) Gabriel Bortoleto	85
1	4	(Barbados) Zane Maloney	75
1	5	(Argentina) Franco Colapinto	75

Teams' Championship standings

	Pos.	Team	Points
	1	(Spain) Campos Racing	143
	2	(United Kingdom) Hitech Pulse-Eight	142
	3	(Netherlands) MP Motorsport	137
	4	(United Kingdom) Invicta Racing	137
1	5	(France) DAMS Lucas Oil	96

- Note: Only the top five positions are included for both sets of standings.

== See also ==
- 2024 Austrian Grand Prix
- 2024 Spielberg Formula 3 round

Previous round: 2024 Barcelona Formula 2 round	FIA Formula 2 Championship; 2024 season	Next round: 2024 Silverstone Formula 2 round
Previous round: 2023 Spielberg Formula 2 round	Spielberg Formula 2 round	Next round: 2025 Spielberg Formula 2 round
