= 2024 Silverstone Formula 2 round =

Motor racing event

(United Kingdom) 2024 Silverstone Formula 2 round
Round details
- Round 8 of 14 in the 2024 FIA Formula 2 Championship.
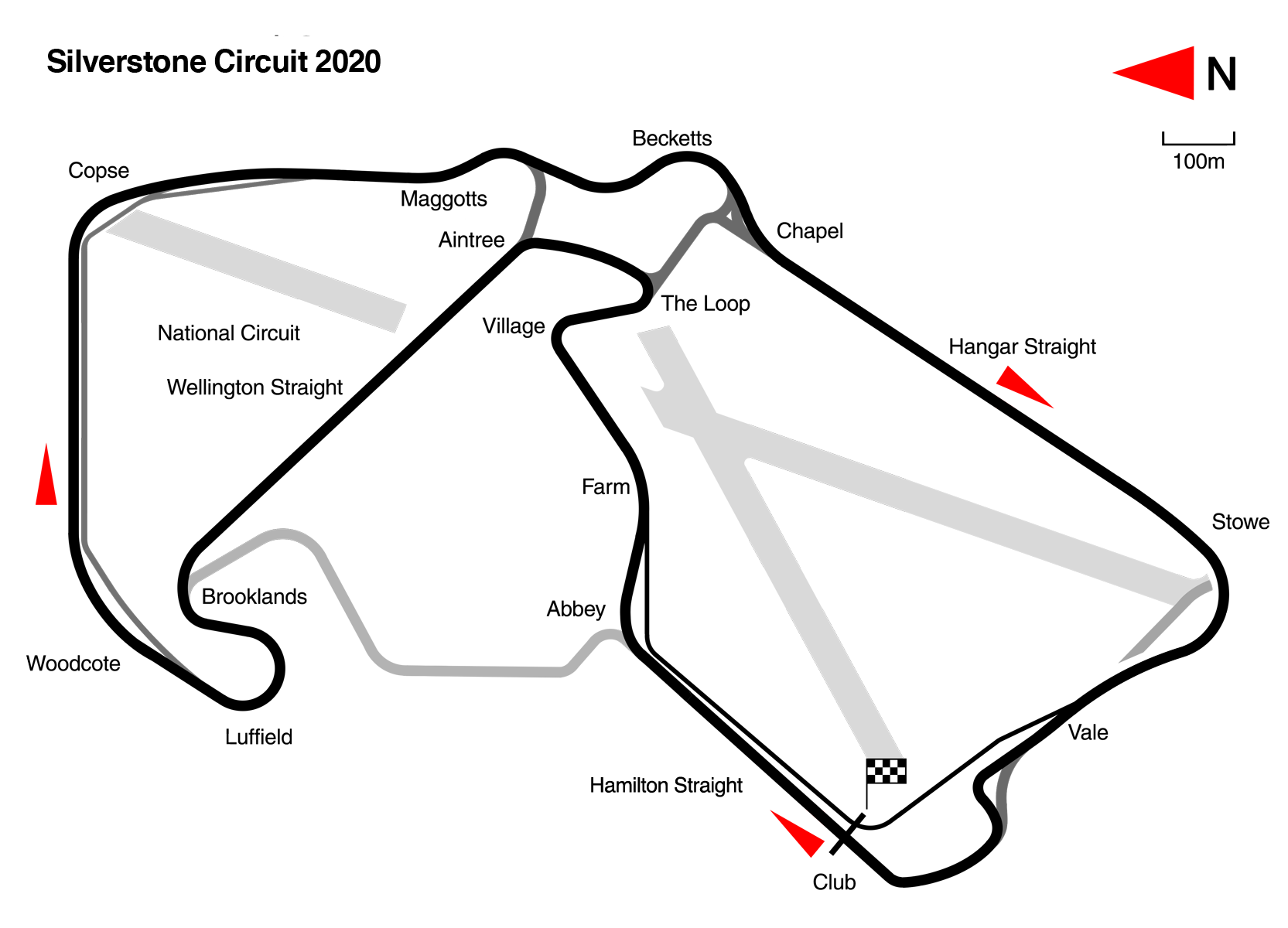
- Location: Silverstone Circuit, Silverstone, United Kingdom
- Course: Permanent racing facility 5.891 km (3.660 mi)

Sprint Race
- Date: 6 July 2024
- Laps: 21
Podium
First	(Italy) Andrea Kimi Antonelli	Prema Racing
Second	(Barbados) Zane Maloney	Rodin Motorsport
Third	(India) Kush Maini	Invicta Racing
Fastest lap
Driver	(Italy) Andrea Kimi Antonelli	Prema Racing
- Time: 2:01.267 (on lap 18)

Feature Race
- Date: 7 July 2024
- Laps: 29
Pole position
Driver	(France) Isack Hadjar	Campos Racing
Time	1:39.368	
Podium
First	(France) Isack Hadjar	Campos Racing
Second	(Barbados) Zane Maloney	Rodin Motorsport
Third	(United States) Jak Crawford	DAMS Lucas Oil
Fastest lap
Driver	(Argentina) Franco Colapinto	MP Motorsport
- Time: 1:41.357 (on lap 25)

The 2024 Silverstone Formula 2 round was a motor racing event held between 5 and 7 July 2024 at the Silverstone Circuit. It was the eighth round of the 2024 Formula 2 Championship and was held in support of the 2024 British Grand Prix.

== Classification ==
=== Qualifying ===
Qualifying was held on 5 July 2024, at 15:00 local time (UTC+1).

Pos.	No.	Driver	Entrant	Time	Grid SR	Grid FR
1	20	(France) Isack Hadjar	Campos Racing	1:39.368	10	1
2	1	(France) Victor Martins	ART Grand Prix	+0.251	9	2
3	11	(Norway) Dennis Hauger	MP Motorsport	+0.320	8	3
4	12	(Argentina) Franco Colapinto	MP Motorsport	+0.343	7	4
5	3	(United Kingdom) Oliver Bearman	Prema Racing	+0.358	6	5
6	10	(Brazil) Gabriel Bortoleto	Invicta Racing	+0.433	5	6
7	7	(United States) Jak Crawford	DAMS Lucas Oil	+0.458	4	7
8	9	(India) Kush Maini	Invicta Racing	+0.488	3	8
9	5	(Barbados) Zane Maloney	Rodin Motorsport	+0.633	2	9
10	4	(Italy) Andrea Kimi Antonelli	Prema Racing	+0.801	1	10
11	6	(Japan) Ritomo Miyata	Rodin Motorsport	+0.808	11	11
12	17	(Estonia) Paul Aron	Hitech Pulse-Eight	+0.813	12	12
13	22	(Netherlands) Richard Verschoor	Trident	+0.919	13	13
14	2	(United Kingdom) Zak O'Sullivan	ART Grand Prix	+1.069	14	14
15	8	(United States) Juan Manuel Correa	DAMS Lucas Oil	+1.119	15	15
16	24	(Paraguay) Joshua Dürksen	AIX Racing	+1.163	16	16
17	15	(Mexico) Rafael Villagómez	Van Amersfoort Racing	+1.231	17	17
18	16	(Belgium) Amaury Cordeel	Hitech Pulse-Eight	+1.245	18	18
19	21	(Spain) Pepe Martí	Campos Racing	+1.324	19	19
20	14	(Brazil) Enzo Fittipaldi	Van Amersfoort Racing	+1.337	20	20
21	25	(United Kingdom) Taylor Barnard	AIX Racing	+1.358	21	21
22	23	(Czech Republic) Roman Staněk	Trident	+2.257	22	22

=== Sprint Race ===
The Sprint race was held on 6 July 2024, at 13:15 local time (UTC+1).

Pos.	No.	Driver	Entrant	Laps	Time/Retired	Grid	Points
1	4	(Italy) Andrea Kimi Antonelli	Prema Racing	21	1:02:34.856	1	10 (1)
2	5	(Barbados) Zane Maloney	Rodin Motorsport	21	+8.683	2	8
3	9	(India) Kush Maini	Invicta Racing	21	+11.257	3	6
4	10	(Brazil) Gabriel Bortoleto	Invicta Racing	21	+15.895^{1}	5	5
5	12	(Argentina) Franco Colapinto	MP Motorsport	21	+18.064	7	4
6	7	(United States) Jak Crawford	DAMS Lucas Oil	21	+18.791	4	3
7	11	(Norway) Dennis Hauger	MP Motorsport	21	+20.191	8	2
8	23	(Czech Republic) Roman Staněk	Trident	21	+20.932	22	1
9	25	(United Kingdom) Taylor Barnard	AIX Racing	21	+21.367	21	
10	6	(Japan) Ritomo Miyata	Rodin Motorsport	21	+24.232	11	
11	22	(Netherlands) Richard Verschoor	Trident	21	+25.773	13	
12	8	(United States) Juan Manuel Correa	DAMS Lucas Oil	21	+28.071	15	
13	14	(Brazil) Enzo Fittipaldi	Van Amersfoort Racing	21	+29.749	20	
14	15	(Mexico) Rafael Villagómez	Van Amersfoort Racing	21	+32.521	17	
15	16	(Belgium) Amaury Cordeel	Hitech Pulse-Eight	21	+33.104	18	
16	24	(Paraguay) Joshua Dürksen	AIX Racing	21	+33.960	16	
DNF	2	(United Kingdom) Zak O'Sullivan	ART Grand Prix	16	Collision damage	14	
DNF	1	(France) Victor Martins	ART Grand Prix	15	Collision/Spun off	9	
DNF	3	(United Kingdom) Oliver Bearman	Prema Racing	14	Engine	6	
DNF	20	(France) Isack Hadjar	Campos Racing	7	Spun off Beached In Gravel	10	
DNF	17	(Estonia) Paul Aron	Hitech Pulse-Eight	7	Engine	12	
DNF	21	(Spain) Pepe Martí	Campos Racing	7	Collision damage	19	
Fastest lap set by (Italy) Andrea Kimi Antonelli: 2:01.267 (lap 18)

Notes:

- ^1 – Gabriel Bortoleto originally finished third, but was later given a five-second time-penalty for overtaking off the track and gaining an advantage on the last lap. As a consequence, Bortoleto was demoted to fourth place, whilst his teammate Kush Maini was promoted onto the podium.

=== Feature Race ===
The Feature race was held on 7 July 2024, at 09:55 local time (UTC+1).

Pos.	No.	Driver	Entrant	Laps	Time/Retired	Grid	Points
1	20	(France) Isack Hadjar	Campos Racing	29	54:48.351	1	25 (2)
2	5	(Barbados) Zane Maloney	Rodin Motorsport	29	+1.657	9	18
3	7	(United States) Jak Crawford	DAMS Lucas Oil	29	+1.822^{1}	7	15
4	12	(Argentina) Franco Colapinto	MP Motorsport	29	+11.991	4	12 (1)
5	1	(France) Victor Martins	ART Grand Prix	29	+12.228	2	10
6	10	(Brazil) Gabriel Bortoleto	Invicta Racing	29	+14.510	6	8
7	3	(United Kingdom) Oliver Bearman	Prema Racing	29	+17.478	5	6
8	23	(Brazil) Enzo Fittipaldi	Van Amersfoort Racing	29	+17.990	20	4
9	11	(Norway) Dennis Hauger	MP Motorsport	29	+23.192	3	2
10	21	(Spain) Pepe Martí	Campos Racing	29	+26.778	18	1
11	2	(United Kingdom) Zak O'Sullivan	ART Grand Prix	29	+32.662	19^{2}	
12	17	(Estonia) Paul Aron	Hitech Pulse-Eight	29	+33.270	12	
13	22	(Netherlands) Richard Verschoor	Trident	29	+34.951	13	
14	25	(United Kingdom) Taylor Barnard	AIX Racing	29	+37.294	21	
15	16	(Belgium) Amaury Cordeel	Hitech Pulse-Eight	29	+42.346	17	
16	15	(Mexico) Rafael Villagómez	Van Amersfoort Racing	29	+45.649	16	
17	6	(Japan) Ritomo Miyata	Rodin Motorsport	29	+46.539	11	
18	23	(Czech Republic) Roman Staněk	Trident	29	+50.783	22	
19	9	(India) Kush Maini	Invicta Racing	29	+1:02.301	8	
20	8	(United States) Juan Manuel Correa	DAMS Lucas Oil	29	+1:32.471	14	
DNF	24	(Paraguay) Joshua Dürksen	AIX Racing	2	Collision/Spun off	15	
DNF	4	(Italy) Andrea Kimi Antonelli	Prema Racing	0	Collision	10	
Fastest lap set by (Argentina) Franco Colapinto: 1:41.357 (lap 25)

Notes:

- ^1 – Jak Crawford originally finished the race in first place, but was given a five-second time-penalty during the race for an unsafe release infringement. As a result, Isack Hadjar inherited the win.
- ^2 – Zak O'Sullivan received a five-place grid penalty prior to the Feature Race after causing a collision with Victor Martins during the Sprint Race.

== Standings after the event ==
Drivers' Championship standings

	Pos.	Driver	Points
1	1	(France) Isack Hadjar	133
1	2	(Estonia) Paul Aron	117
1	3	(Barbados) Zane Maloney	101
1	4	(Brazil) Gabriel Bortoleto	98
	5	(Argentina) Franco Colapinto	92

Teams' Championship standings

	Pos.	Team	Points
	1	(Spain) Campos Racing	171
1	2	(Netherlands) MP Motorsport	158
1	3	(United Kingdom) Invicta Racing	156
2	4	(United Kingdom) Hitech Pulse-Eight	142
1	5	(New Zealand) Rodin Motorsport	120

- Note: Only the top five positions are included for both sets of standings.

== See also ==
- 2024 British Grand Prix
- 2024 Silverstone Formula 3 round

== Notes ==
Previous round: 2024 Spielberg Formula 2 round	FIA Formula 2 Championship; 2024 season	Next round: 2024 Budapest Formula 2 round
Previous round: 2023 Silverstone Formula 2 round	Silverstone Formula 2 round	Next round: 2025 Silverstone Formula 2 round
