= 2024 Melbourne Formula 2 round =

Motor racing event

(Australia) 2024 Melbourne Formula 2 round
Round details
- Round 3 of 14 in the 2024 FIA Formula 2 Championship.
- Location: Albert Park Circuit; Melbourne, Australia
- Course: Temporary street circuit 5.278 km (3.280 mi)

Sprint Race
- Date: 23 March 2024
- Laps: 23
Podium
| First | (Czech Republic) Roman Staněk | Trident |
| Second | (Norway) Dennis Hauger | MP Motorsport |
| Third | (India) Kush Maini | Invicta Racing |
Fastest lap
| Driver | (France) Isack Hadjar | Campos Racing |
- Time: 1:31.573 (on lap 16)

Feature Race
- Date: 24 March 2024
- Laps: 33
Pole position
| Driver | (Norway) Dennis Hauger | MP Motorsport |
| Time | 1:28.694 | |
Podium
| First | (France) Isack Hadjar | Campos Racing |
| Second | (Estonia) Paul Aron | Hitech Pulse-Eight |
| Third | (Barbados) Zane Maloney | Rodin Motorsport |
Fastest lap
| Driver | (United States) Jak Crawford | DAMS Lucas Oil |
- Time: 1:30.961 (on lap 33)

The 2024 Melbourne FIA Formula 2 round was a motor racing event held between 22 and 24 March 2024 at the Albert Park Circuit. It was the third round of the 2024 FIA Formula 2 Championship and was held in support of the 2024 Australian Grand Prix.

== Classification ==
=== Qualifying ===
Qualifying was held on 22 March 2024, at 17:30 local time (UTC+11).

| Pos. | No. | Driver | Entrant | Time/Gap | Grid SR | Grid FR |
|---|---|---|---|---|---|---|
| 1 | 11 | (Norway) Dennis Hauger | MP Motorsport | 1:28.694 | 10 | 1 |
| 2 | 4 | (Italy) Andrea Kimi Antonelli | Prema Racing | +0.344 | 9 | 2 |
| 3 | 22 | (Netherlands) Richard Verschoor | Trident | +0.479 | 8 | 3 |
| 4 | 9 | (India) Kush Maini | Invicta Racing | +0.619 | 7 | 4 |
| 5 | 5 | (Barbados) Zane Maloney | Rodin Motorsport | +0.680 | 6 | 5 |
| 6 | 17 | (Estonia) Paul Aron | Hitech Pulse-Eight | +0.691 | 5 | 6 |
| 7 | 21 | (Spain) Pepe Martí | Campos Racing | +0.735 | 4 | 7 |
| 8 | 20 | (France) Isack Hadjar | Campos Racing | +0.776 | 3 | 8 |
| 9 | 10 | (Brazil) Gabriel Bortoleto | Invicta Racing | +0.808 | 2 | 9 |
| 10 | 23 | (Czech Republic) Roman Staněk | Trident | +0.900 | 1 | 10 |
| 11 | 2 | (United Kingdom) Zak O'Sullivan | ART Grand Prix | +0.938 | 11 | 11 |
| 12 | 6 | (Japan) Ritomo Miyata | Rodin Motorsport | +1.008 | 12 | 12 |
| 13 | 12 | (Argentina) Franco Colapinto | MP Motorsport | +1.278 | 13 | 13 |
| 14 | 24 | (Paraguay) Joshua Dürksen | PHM AIX Racing | +1.311 | 14 | 14 |
| 15 | 25 | (United Kingdom) Taylor Barnard | PHM AIX Racing | +1.538 | 15 | 15 |
| 16 | 3 | (United Kingdom) Oliver Bearman | Prema Racing | +1.876 | 16 | 16 |
| 17 | 15 | (Mexico) Rafael Villagómez | Van Amersfoort Racing | +2.389 | 17 | 17 |
| 18 | 14 | (Brazil) Enzo Fittipaldi | Van Amersfoort Racing | +2.884 | 18 | 18 |
| 19 | 16 | (Belgium) Amaury Cordeel | Hitech Pulse-Eight | +3.047 | 19 | 19 |
| 20 | 8 | (United States) Juan Manuel Correa | DAMS Lucas Oil | +3.134 | 20 | 20 |
107% time: 1:34.902 (+6.208)
| — | 7 | (United States) Jak Crawford | DAMS Lucas Oil | +26.614^{1} | 21 | 21 |
| — | 1 | (France) Victor Martins | ART Grand Prix | +31.142^{1} | 22 | 22 |

Notes:

- ^1 – Jak Crawford and Victor Martins both failed to set a time within the 107%-mark after crashing during qualifying but were given permission from the stewards to start both races.

=== Sprint race ===
The sprint race was held on 23 March 2024, at 14:15 local time (UTC+11).

| Pos. | No. | Driver | Entrant | Laps | Time/Retired | Grid | Points |
|---|---|---|---|---|---|---|---|
| 1 | 23 | (Czech Republic) Roman Staněk | Trident | 23 | 43:59.337 | 1 | 10 |
| 2 | 11 | (Norway) Dennis Hauger | MP Motorsport | 23 | +0.349 | 10 | 8 |
| 3 | 9 | (India) Kush Maini | Invicta Racing | 23 | +1.754 | 7 | 6 |
| 4 | 12 | (Argentina) Franco Colapinto | MP Motorsport | 23 | +2.393 | 13 | 5 |
| 5 | 6 | (Japan) Ritomo Miyata | Rodin Motorsport | 23 | +2.984 | 12 | 4 |
| 6 | 20 | (France) Isack Hadjar | Campos Racing | 23 | +3.173^{1} | 3 | 3 (1) |
| 7 | 1 | (France) Victor Martins | ART Grand Prix | 23 | +3.639 | 21 | 2 |
| 8 | 2 | (United Kingdom) Zak O'Sullivan | ART Grand Prix | 23 | +6.615 | 11 | 1 |
| 9 | 7 | (United States) Jak Crawford | DAMS Lucas Oil | 23 | +7.297 | 22 | |
| 10 | 5 | (Barbados) Zane Maloney | Rodin Motorsport | 23 | +7.921 | 6 | |
| 11 | 8 | (United States) Juan Manuel Correa | DAMS Lucas Oil | 23 | +10.156 | 20 | |
| 12 | 14 | (Brazil) Enzo Fittipaldi | Van Amersfoort Racing | 23 | +11.864 | 18 | |
| 13 | 25 | (United Kingdom) Taylor Barnard | PHM AIX Racing | 23 | +15.612 | 15 | |
| 14 | 3 | (United Kingdom) Oliver Bearman | Prema Racing | 23 | +16.095^{2} | 16 | |
| 15 | 15 | (Mexico) Rafael Villagómez | Van Amersfoort Racing | 19 | +16.269 | 17 | |
| 16 | 16 | (Belgium) Amaury Cordeel | Hitech Pulse-Eight | 23 | +35.544 | 19 | |
| 17 | 24 | (Paraguay) Joshua Dürksen | PHM AIX Racing | 23 | +44.447 | 14 | |
| 18 | 17 | (Estonia) Paul Aron | Hitech Pulse-Eight | 23 | +1:12.351 | 5 | |
| DNF | 4 | (Italy) Andrea Kimi Antonelli | Prema Racing | 9 | Spun off | 9 | |
| DNF | 22 | (Netherlands) Richard Verschoor | Trident | 9 | Spun off | 8 | |
| DNF | 10 | (Brazil) Gabriel Bortoleto | Invicta Racing | 0 | Collision | 2 | |
| DNF | 21 | (Spain) Pepe Martí | Campos Racing | 0 | Collision | 4 | |
Fastest lap set by (France) Isack Hadjar: 1:31.573 (lap 16)

Notes

- ^1 – Isack Hadjar originally won the sprint race, but was later given a ten-second time-penalty for causing a collision at the start, which eliminated Gabriel Bortoleto and Pepe Martí. The penalty dropped him down to sixth place in the final classification, with Roman Staněk inheriting the win as a consequence.
- ^2 – Oliver Bearman originally finished eighth, but was later given a ten-second time-penalty for forcing Joshua Dürksen off the track, dropping him down to P14 in the final classification.

=== Feature race ===
The feature race was held on 24 March 2024, at 11:35 local time (UTC+11).

| Pos. | No. | Driver | Entrant | Laps | Time/Retired | Grid | Points |
|---|---|---|---|---|---|---|---|
| 1 | 20 | (France) Isack Hadjar | Campos Racing | 33 | 56:42.116 | 8 | 25 |
| 2 | 17 | (Estonia) Paul Aron | Hitech Pulse-Eight | 33 | +4.454 | 6 | 18 |
| 3 | 5 | (Barbados) Zane Maloney | Rodin Motorsport | 33 | +9.649 | 5 | 15 |
| 4 | 4 | (Italy) Andrea Kimi Antonelli | Prema Racing | 33 | +12.990 | 2 | 12 |
| 5 | 6 | (Japan) Ritomo Miyata | Rodin Motorsport | 33 | +13.652 | 12 | 10 |
| 6 | 22 | (Netherlands) Richard Verschoor | Trident | 33 | +18.059 | 3 | 8 |
| 7 | 15 | (Mexico) Rafael Villagómez | Van Amersfoort Racing | 33 | +23.600 | 17 | 6 |
| 8 | 1 | (France) Victor Martins | ART Grand Prix | 33 | +25.080 | 21 | 4 |
| 9 | 3 | (United Kingdom) Oliver Bearman | Prema Racing | 33 | +29.442 | 16 | 2 |
| 10 | 7 | (United States) Jak Crawford | DAMS Lucas Oil | 33 | +31.199 | 22 | 1 (1) |
| 11 | 16 | (Belgium) Amaury Cordeel | Hitech Pulse-Eight | 33 | +33.841 | 19 | |
| 12 | 9 | (India) Kush Maini | Invicta Racing | 33 | +34.041 | 4 | |
| 13 | 21 | (Spain) Pepe Martí | Campos Racing | 33 | +34.594 | 7 | |
| 14 | 8 | (United States) Juan Manuel Correa | DAMS Lucas Oil | 33 | +41.772 | 20 | |
| 15 | 23 | (Czech Republic) Roman Staněk | Trident | 33 | +58.194 | 10 | |
| 16 | 25 | (United Kingdom) Taylor Barnard | PHM AIX Racing | 33 | +59.319 | 15 | |
| 17 | 14 | (Brazil) Enzo Fittipaldi | Van Amersfoort Racing | 33 | +1:09.169 | 14 | |
| DNF | 11 | (Norway) Dennis Hauger | MP Motorsport | 9 | Accident | 1 | (2) |
| DNF | 10 | (Brazil) Gabriel Bortoleto | Invicta Racing | 6 | Hydraulics | 9 | |
| DNF | 24 | (Paraguay) Joshua Dürksen | PHM AIX Racing | 5 | Collision | 14 | |
| DNF | 2 | (United Kingdom) Zak O'Sullivan | ART Grand Prix | 5 | Collision damage | 11 | |
| DSQ | 12 | (Argentina) Franco Colapinto | MP Motorsport | 33 | Disqualified^{1} | 13 | |
Fastest lap set by (United States) Jak Crawford: 1:30.961 (lap 33)

Notes:

- ^1 – Franco Colapinto originally finished seventh, but was later disqualified as his car was found to have not engaged the race start set-up procedure, a breach of Art 1.5.2 of the FIA Formula 2 Technical Regulations.

== Standings after the event ==
Drivers' Championship standings

| | Pos. | Driver | Points |
|---|---|---|---|
| | 1 | (Barbados) Zane Maloney | 62 |
| 2 | 2 | (Estonia) Paul Aron | 47 |
| | 3 | (Norway) Dennis Hauger | 41 |
| 9 | 4 | (France) Isack Hadjar | 34 |
| | 5 | (India) Kush Maini | 33 |

Teams' Championship standings

| | Pos. | Team | Points |
|---|---|---|---|
| | 1 | (New Zealand) Rodin Motorsport | 78 |
| 4 | 2 | (Spain) Campos Racing | 60 |
| 1 | 3 | (United Kingdom) Hitech Pulse-Eight | 57 |
| 1 | 4 | (Netherlands) MP Motorsport | 54 |
| 3 | 5 | (United Kingdom) Invicta Racing | 48 |

- Note: Only the top five positions are included for both sets of standings.

== See also ==
- 2024 Australian Grand Prix
- 2024 Melbourne Formula 3 round

| Previous round: 2024 Jeddah Formula 2 round | FIA Formula 2 Championship; 2024 season | Next round: 2024 Imola Formula 2 round |
| Previous round: 2023 Melbourne Formula 2 round | Melbourne Formula 2 round | Next round: 2025 Melbourne Formula 2 round |
