= Niels Koolen =

Dutch racing driver (born 2001)

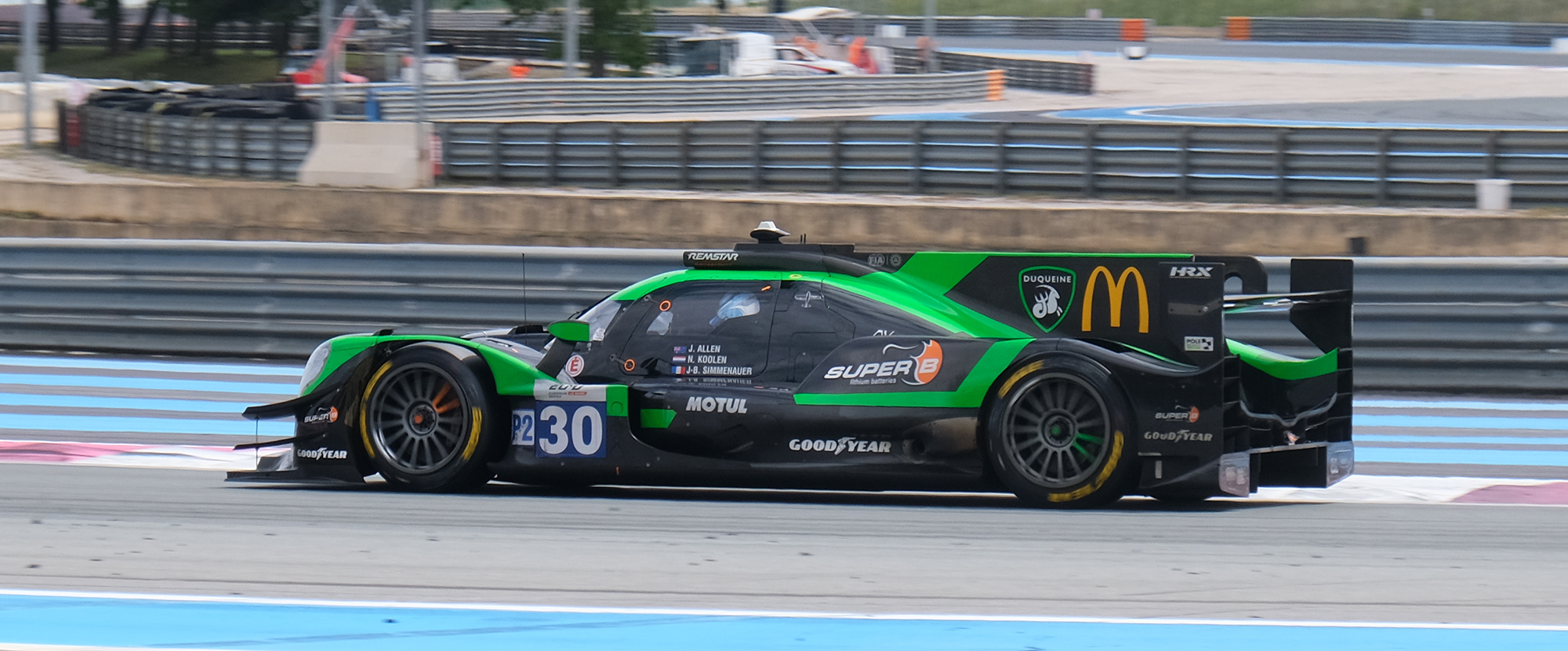
- Koolen at the Circuit Paul Ricard in 2024
- Nationality: (Netherlands) Dutch
- Born: 25 May 2001 (age 25) Vorden, Gelderland, Netherlands
- Relatives: Kees Koolen (father)

Indy NXT career
- Debut season: 2024
- Current team: Abel Motorsports
- Categorisation: FIA Silver
- Car number: 32
- Former teams: HMD Motorsports, Chip Ganassi Racing
- Starts: 23
- Wins: 0
- Podiums: 0
- Poles: 0
- Fastest laps: 0
- Best finish: 8th in 2025

Previous series
- 2024 2024 2023 2023 2023 2022 2022: European Le Mans Series; FIA Formula 2 FR European; FR Middle East; Eurocup-3; Italian F4; F4 Spanish
- Statistics up to date as of 14 October 2026.

Niels Koolen (Dutch pronunciation: [nils ˈkoːlə(n)]; born 25 May 2001) is a Dutch racing driver who competes in Asian Le Mans Series with Inter Europol Competition. He is set to compete in Indy NXT with Abel Motorsports in 2027.

Koolen has previously competed in the European Le Mans Series driving for the Duqueine Team.He is the son of rally raid driver and businessman Kees Koolen.

Koolen is a member of A14 Management, overseen by two-time Formula One world champion Fernando Alonso.

== Junior career ==
=== Formula 4 ===
After competing in karting prior to the COVID-19 pandemic, Koolen, a relatively latecomer to single-seater racing aged 21, made his car racing debut in Round 6 of the 2022 F4 Spanish Championship, driving for Monlau Motorsport. He contested the final two rounds of the 2022 Italian F4 Championship, also with Monlau Motorsport, competing under a Belgian license.

=== Formula Regional ===
==== Formula Regional Middle East Championship ====
On 5 January 2023, it was announced that Koolen would drive for VAR-Pinnacle Motorsport in the 2023 Formula Regional Middle East Championship. He finished 31st in the final standings with no points finishes.

==== Formula Regional European Championship ====
Following the 2022 season, Koolen partook in several Formula Regional European Championship tests, driving for Van Amersfoort Racing. He would ultimately sign with the Dutch-based team to participate in the 2023 championship alongside Joshua Dufek and Kas Haverkort. He struggled and was considerably behind his teammate throughout the whole campaign, and finished the standings 37th, with a best finish of nineteenth.

=== Eurocup-3 ===
Koolen would participate in two rounds of Eurocup-3 in 2023 at Jerez and Estoril, failing to score points in either round.

=== FIA Formula 2 Championship ===
In August 2024, after Taylor Barnard vacated his seat in the Formula 2 Championship, Koolen was drafted by AIX Racing to race for them in the category for the Monza and Baku rounds alongside Joshua Dürksen. He got nineteenth in both the Monza sprint and feature race. After the next weekend in Baku, AIX Racing confirmed that Koolen would not return for the final two weekends of the season.

=== Indy NXT ===
==== 2024 ====
In 2024, Koolen switched to Indy NXT with HMD Motorsports. In the first race of the Indianapolis Motor Speedway, he finished tenth. This was his best result of the season.

==== 2025 ====
In 2025, Chip Ganassi Racing signed Koolen to run the full season, marking his second season in the category. He finished eighth in the points standings with a best finish of fifth at Iowa Speedway.

==== 2026 ====
Koolen continued with Chip Ganassi Racing for the 2026 season.

==== 2027 ====
Koolen will switch to Abel Motorsports for the 2027 season.

== Sports car racing career ==
=== European Le Mans Series ===
Alongside his Indy NXT season, Koolen made his endurance racing debut and competed in the 2024 European Le Mans Series with the Duqueine Team.

=== Asian Le Mans Series ===
Following the 2026 Indy NXT season, Koolen joined Inter Europol Competition to compete in the LMP2 class of the 2026–27 Asian Le Mans Series.

== Racing record ==
=== Karting career summary ===
| Season | Series | Team | Position |
|---|---|---|---|
| 2016 | SKUSA SuperNationals XX — X30 Junior | 2Wild Karting | 54th |
| 2017 | SKUSA SuperNationals XXI — X30 Senior | 2Wild Karting | 54th |
| 2018 | IAME Euro Series — X30 Senior | Evolution/Super B Batteries | 17th |
| 2019 | IAME Series Benelux — X30 Senior | | 33rd |
| 2019 | FIA Karting European Championship — OK | Team Evolution | |
| 2019 | IAME Euro Series — X30 Senior | Team Evolution | 19th |
| 2019 | IAME Winter Cup — X30 Senior | Team Evolution | 16th |

=== Racing career summary ===
| Season | Series | Team | Races | Wins | Poles | F/Laps | Podiums | Points | Position |
|---|---|---|---|---|---|---|---|---|---|
| 2022 | F4 Spanish Championship | Monlau Motorsport | 3 | 0 | 0 | 0 | 0 | 0 | NC† |
| 2022 | Italian F4 Championship | Monlau Motorsport | 5 | 0 | 0 | 0 | 0 | 0 | 43rd |
| 2023 | Formula Regional Middle East Championship | Pinnacle VAR | 15 | 0 | 0 | 0 | 0 | 0 | 31st |
| 2023 | Formula Regional European Championship | Van Amersfoort Racing | 18 | 0 | 0 | 0 | 0 | 0 | 37th |
| 2023 | Eurocup-3 | GRS Team | 2 | 0 | 0 | 0 | 0 | 0 | 25th |
| 2024 | Indy NXT | HMD Motorsports | 9 | 0 | 0 | 0 | 0 | 140 | 20th |
| 2024 | European Le Mans Series - LMP2 | Duqueine Team | 5 | 0 | 0 | 0 | 0 | 20 | 17th |
| 2024 | Ultimate Cup Series - Proto P3 | Inter Europol Competition | 1 | 0 | 0 | 0 | 1 | 15 | 25th |
| 2024 | FIA Formula 2 Championship | AIX Racing | 4 | 0 | 0 | 0 | 0 | 0 | 32nd |
| 2024 | GT World Challenge Europe Endurance Cup | Comtoyou Racing | 2 | 0 | 0 | 0 | 0 | 0 | NC |
| 2025 | Indy NXT | Chip Ganassi Racing | 14 | 0 | 0 | 0 | 0 | 288 | 8th |
| 2025–26 | Porsche Carrera Cup Middle East | Team GP Elite | 2 | 0 | 0 | 0 | 0 | 0 | NC† |
| 2026 | Indy NXT | Chip Ganassi Racing | 17 | 0 | 0 | 0 | 0 | 268 | 15th |
| 2026 | Euroformula Open Championship | Team Motopark | 6 | 0 | 0 | 0 | 0 | 44 | 13rd |
| 2026–27 | Asian Le Mans Series - LMP2 | Inter Europol Competition | 2 | 0 | 0 | 0 | 0 | 0* | 15th* |
| 2027 | Indy NXT | Abel Motorsports | 0 | 0 | 0 | 0 | 0 | 0 | TBD |

^{†} As Koolen was a guest driver, he was ineligible to score points. * Season still in progress.

=== Complete F4 Spanish Championship results ===
(key) (Races in bold indicate pole position) (Races in italics indicate fastest lap)

| Year | Team | 1 | 2 | 3 | 4 | 5 | 6 | 7 | 8 | 9 | 10 | 11 | 12 | 13 | 14 | 15 | 16 | 17 | 18 | 19 | 20 | 21 | Pos | Points |
|---|---|---|---|---|---|---|---|---|---|---|---|---|---|---|---|---|---|---|---|---|---|---|---|---|
| 2022 | Monlau Motorsport | ALG; 1 | ALG; 2 | ALG; 3 | JER; 1 | JER; 2 | JER; 3 | CRT; 1 | CRT; 2 | CRT; 3 | SPA; 1 | SPA; 2 | SPA; 3 | ARA; 1 | ARA; 2 | ARA; 3 | NAV; 1; 26 | NAV; 2; 21 | NAV; 3; 20 | CAT; 1 | CAT; 2 | CAT; 3 | NC† | 0 |

=== Complete Italian F4 Championship results ===
(key) (Races in bold indicate pole position) (Races in italics indicate fastest lap)

| Year | Team | 1 | 2 | 3 | 4 | 5 | 6 | 7 | 8 | 9 | 10 | 11 | 12 | 13 | 14 | 15 | 16 | 17 | 18 | 19 | 20 | 21 | 22 | DC | Points |
|---|---|---|---|---|---|---|---|---|---|---|---|---|---|---|---|---|---|---|---|---|---|---|---|---|---|
| 2022 | Monlau Motorsport | IMO; 1 | IMO; 2 | IMO; 3 | MIS; 1 | MIS; 2 | MIS; 3 | SPA; 1 | SPA; 2 | SPA; 3 | VLL; 1 | VLL; 2 | VLL; 3 | RBR; 1 | RBR; 2 | RBR; 3 | RBR; 3 | MNZ; 1; 17 | MNZ; 2; 30 | MNZ; 3 C | MUG; 1 Ret | MUG; 2 Ret | MUG; 3; 28 | 43rd | 0 |

=== Complete Formula Regional Middle East Championship results ===
(key) (Races in bold indicate pole position) (Races in italics indicate fastest lap)

| Year | Entrant | 1 | 2 | 3 | 4 | 5 | 6 | 7 | 8 | 9 | 10 | 11 | 12 | 13 | 14 | 15 | DC | Points |
|---|---|---|---|---|---|---|---|---|---|---|---|---|---|---|---|---|---|---|
| 2023 | Pinnacle VAR | DUB1; 1; 22 | DUB1; 2; 22 | DUB1; 3; 21 | KUW1; 1; 12 | KUW1; 2; 21 | KUW1; 3; 21 | KUW2; 1; 20 | KUW2; 2; 21 | KUW2; 3; 22 | DUB2; 1; 22 | DUB2; 2 Ret | DUB2; 3; 18 | ABU; 1; 20 | ABU; 2; 21 | ABU; 3; 14 | 31st | 0 |

=== Complete Formula Regional European Championship results ===
(key) (Races in bold indicate pole position) (Races in italics indicate fastest lap)

| Year | Team | 1 | 2 | 3 | 4 | 5 | 6 | 7 | 8 | 9 | 10 | 11 | 12 | 13 | 14 | 15 | 16 | 17 | 18 | 19 | 20 | DC | Points |
|---|---|---|---|---|---|---|---|---|---|---|---|---|---|---|---|---|---|---|---|---|---|---|---|
| 2023 | Van Amersfoort Racing | IMO; 1; 29 | IMO; 2; 19 | CAT; 1; 26 | CAT; 2; 29 | HUN; 1; 28 | HUN; 2 Ret | SPA; 1; 29 | SPA; 2; 30 | MUG; 1; 24 | MUG; 2 Ret | LEC; 1 Ret | LEC; 2; 26 | RBR; 1; 27 | RBR; 2; 25 | MNZ; 1; 19 | MNZ; 2; 24 | ZAN; 1; 25 | ZAN; 2; 23 | HOC; 1 | HOC; 2 | 37th | 0 |

=== Complete Eurocup-3 results ===
(key) (Races in bold indicate pole position) (Races in italics indicate fastest lap)

| Year | Team | 1 | 2 | 3 | 4 | 5 | 6 | 7 | 8 | 9 | 10 | 11 | 12 | 13 | 14 | 15 | 16 | DC | Points |
|---|---|---|---|---|---|---|---|---|---|---|---|---|---|---|---|---|---|---|---|
| 2023 | GRS Team | SPA; 1 | SPA; 2 | ARA; 1 | ARA; 2 | MNZ; 1 | MNZ; 2 | ZAN; 1 | ZAN; 2 | JER; 1; 12 | JER; 2 Ret | EST; 1 WD | EST; 2 WD | CRT; 1 | CRT; 2 | CAT; 1 | CAT; 2 | 25th | 0 |

=== Complete FIA Formula 2 Championship results ===
(key) (Races in bold indicate pole position) (Races in italics indicate fastest lap)

| Year | Entrant | 1 | 2 | 3 | 4 | 5 | 6 | 7 | 8 | 9 | 10 | 11 | 12 | 13 | 14 | 15 | 16 | 17 | 18 | 19 | 20 | 21 | 22 | 23 | 24 | 25 | 26 | 27 | 28 | DC | Points |
|---|---|---|---|---|---|---|---|---|---|---|---|---|---|---|---|---|---|---|---|---|---|---|---|---|---|---|---|---|---|---|---|
| 2024 | AIX Racing | BHR; SPR | BHR; FEA | JED; SPR | JED; FEA | MEL; SPR | MEL; FEA | IMO; SPR | IMO; FEA | MON; SPR | MON; FEA | CAT; SPR | CAT; FEA | RBR; SPR | RBR; FEA | SIL; SPR | SIL; FEA | HUN; SPR | HUN; FEA | SPA; SPR | SPA; FEA | MNZ; SPR; 19 | MNZ; FEA; 19 | BAK; SPR; 20 | BAK; FEA; Ret | LSL; SPR | LSL; FEA | YMC; SPR | YMC; FEA | 32nd | 0 |

=== Complete European Le Mans Series results ===
(key) (Races in bold indicate pole position; results in italics indicate fastest lap)

| Year | Entrant | Class | Chassis | Engine | 1 | 2 | 3 | 4 | 5 | 6 | Rank | Points |
|---|---|---|---|---|---|---|---|---|---|---|---|---|
| 2024 | Duqueine Team | LMP2 | Oreca 07 | Gibson GK428 4.2 L V8 | CAT; 11 | LEC; 6 | IMO; 9 | SPA | MUG; 8 | ALG; 7 | 17th | 20 |

=== American open–wheel racing results ===
==== Indy NXT ====
(key) (Races in bold indicate pole position) (Races in italics indicate fastest lap) (Races with ^{L} indicate a race lap led) (Races with * indicate most race laps led)

| Year | Team | 1 | 2 | 3 | 4 | 5 | 6 | 7 | 8 | 9 | 10 | 11 | 12 | 13 | 14 | 15 | 16 | 17 | Rank | Points |
|---|---|---|---|---|---|---|---|---|---|---|---|---|---|---|---|---|---|---|---|---|
| 2024 | HMD Motorsports | STP; 21 | BAR; 15 | IMS; 10 | IMS; 14 | DET; 13 | RDA; 13 | LAG; 19 | LAG; 12 | MOH | IOW; 13 | GMP | POR | MIL | NSH | | | | 20th | 140 |
| 2025 | Chip Ganassi Racing | STP; 21 | BAR; 13 | IMS; 18 | IMS; 6 | DET; 9 | GMP; 10 | RDA; 15 | MOH; 14 | IOW; 5 | LAG; 11 | LAG; 6 | POR; 6 | MIL; 12 | NSH; 7 | | | | 8th | 288 |
| 2026 | Chip Ganassi Racing | STP; 22 | ARL; 13 | BAR; 17 | BAR; 20 | IMS; 8 | IMS; 14 | DET; 23 | GAT; 4 | ROA; 11 | ROA; 9 | MOH; 13 | MOH; 13 | NSS; 21 | POR; 17 | MIL; 23 | LAG; 5 | LAG; 23 | 15th | 268 |
