= Rafael Villagómez =

Mexican racing driver (born 2001)

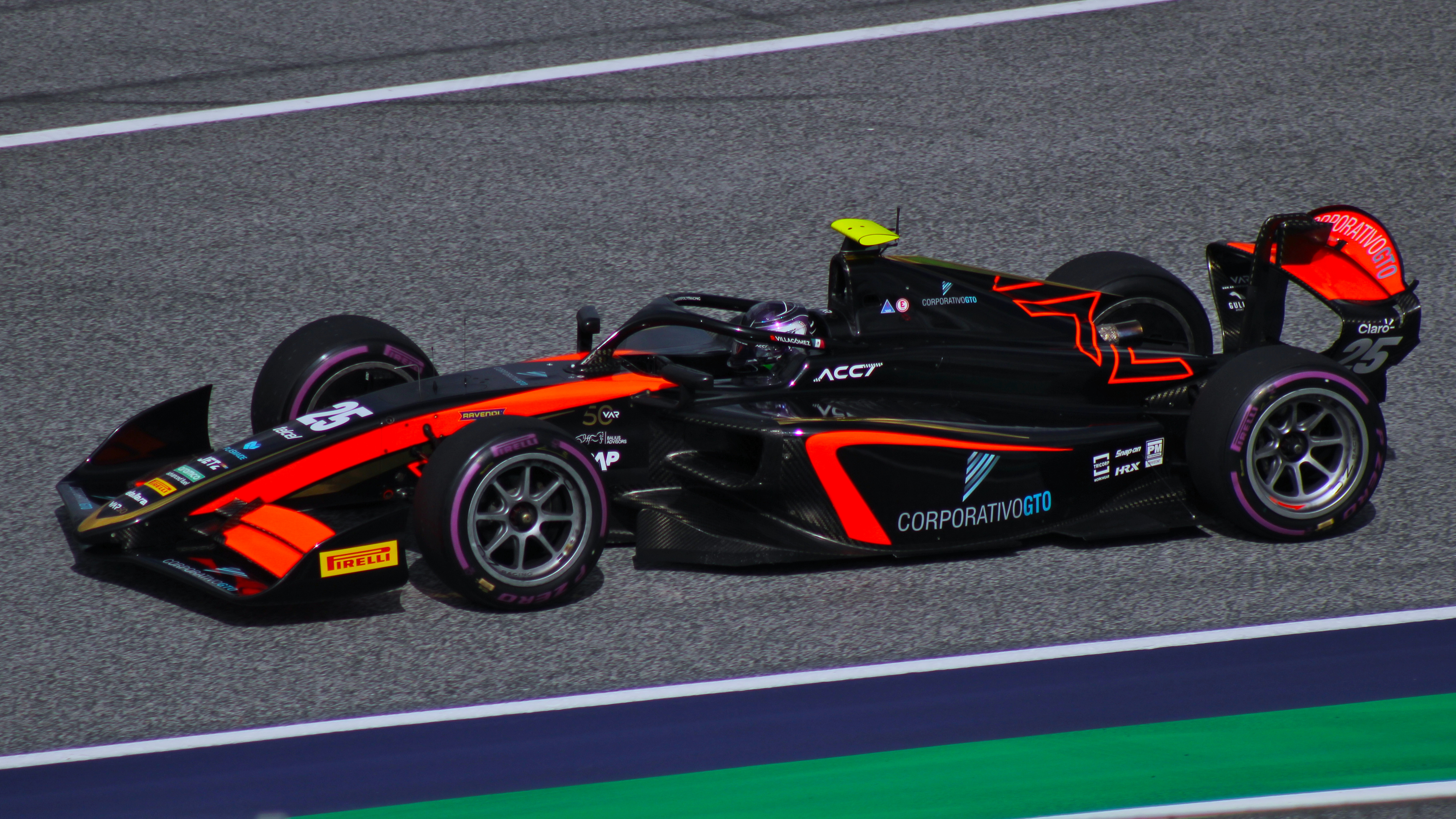
- Villagómez driving the Dallara F2 2024 during the 2025 Spielberg Formula 2 round
- Nationality: (Mexico) Mexican
- Born: Rafael Villagómez Jr. 10 November 2001 (age 25) León, Guanajuato, Mexico

FIA Formula 2 Championship career
- Debut season: 2024
- Current team: Van Amersfoort Racing
- Car number: 23
- Starts: 73
- Wins: 0
- Podiums: 5
- Poles: 0
- Fastest laps: 0
- Best finish: 14th in 2025

Previous series
- 2023; 2021–2023; 2021; 2020–2021; 2020; 2020: FR Middle East; FIA Formula 3; F3 Asian; Euroformula Open; French F4; F4 British

Awards
- 2019: Richard Mille Young Talent Academy
- Statistics up to date as of 25 August 2026.

Rafael Villagómez Jr. (Spanish pronunciation: [rafaˈel βiʝaˈɣomes]; born 10 November 2001) is a Mexican racing driver who competes in the FIA Formula 2 Championship for Van Amersfoort Racing.

Villagómez previously competed in the FIA Formula 3 Championship for three seasons. He won the Richard Mille Young Talent Academy competition in 2019.

== Career summary ==
=== Lower formulae ===
In 2020, Villagómez made his car racing debut in the French F4 Championship, whilst also competing part-time with Fortec Motorsport in the F4 British Championship. He achieved a second-place finish at Le Castellet and, with 121 points, finished sixth in the championship.

In the British series, Villagómez scored a maiden podium finish with third in only his second race. However, in the following races, he was unable to replicate this result and finished eleventh in the standings, only ahead of four other drivers.

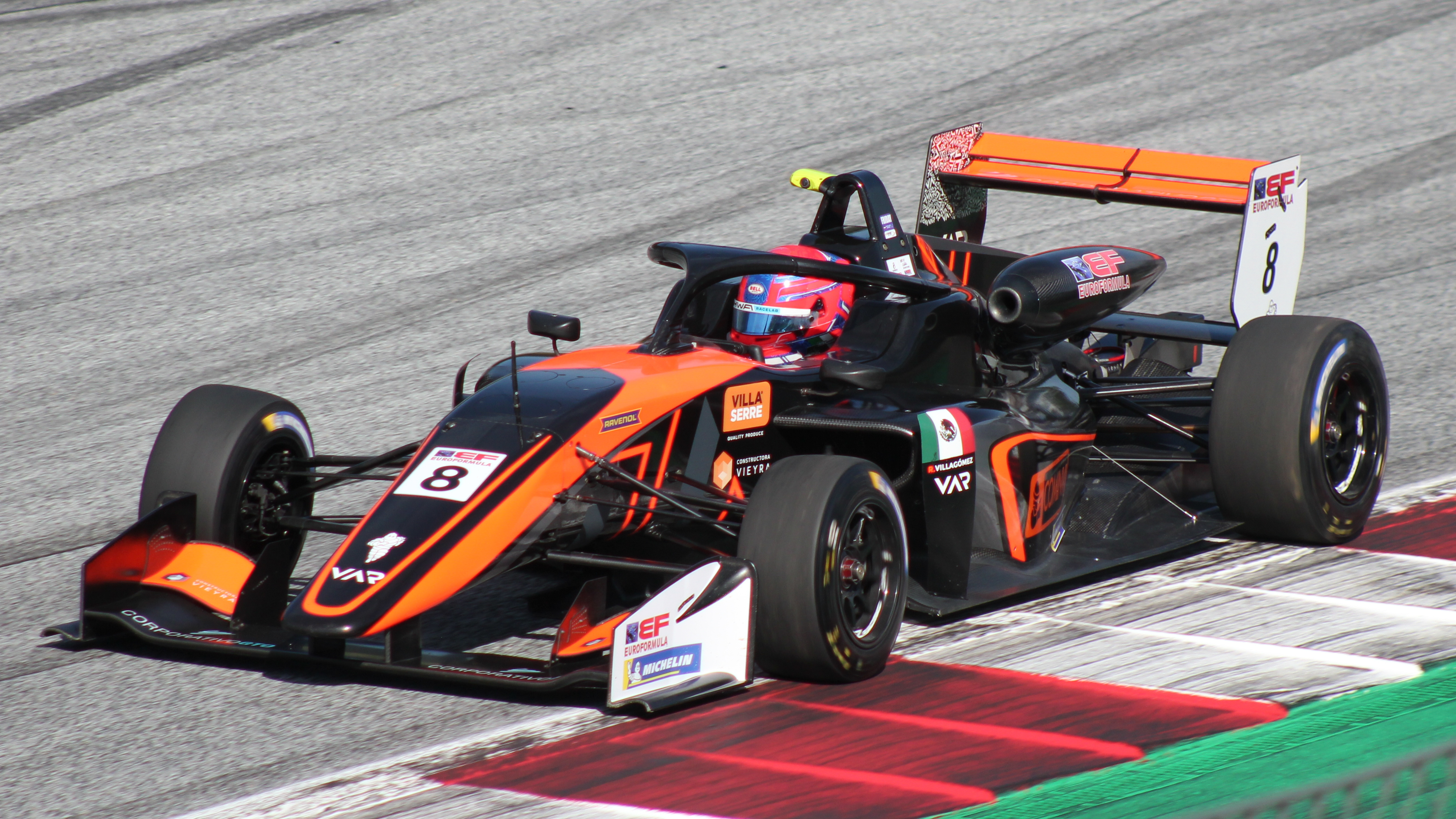
Villagómez at the 2021 Euroformula Open

=== Euroformula Open Championship ===
==== 2020 ====
Villagómez participated in the final round of the 2020 Euroformula Open Championship at the Circuit de Catalunya with Drivex as a guest driver.

==== 2021 ====
Villagómez joined Van Amersfoort Racing for the 2021 season. His best results were five podium finishes, all of which were third-place results. He finished the season eighth in the Drivers' Championship with 135 points.

=== FIA Formula 3 Championship ===
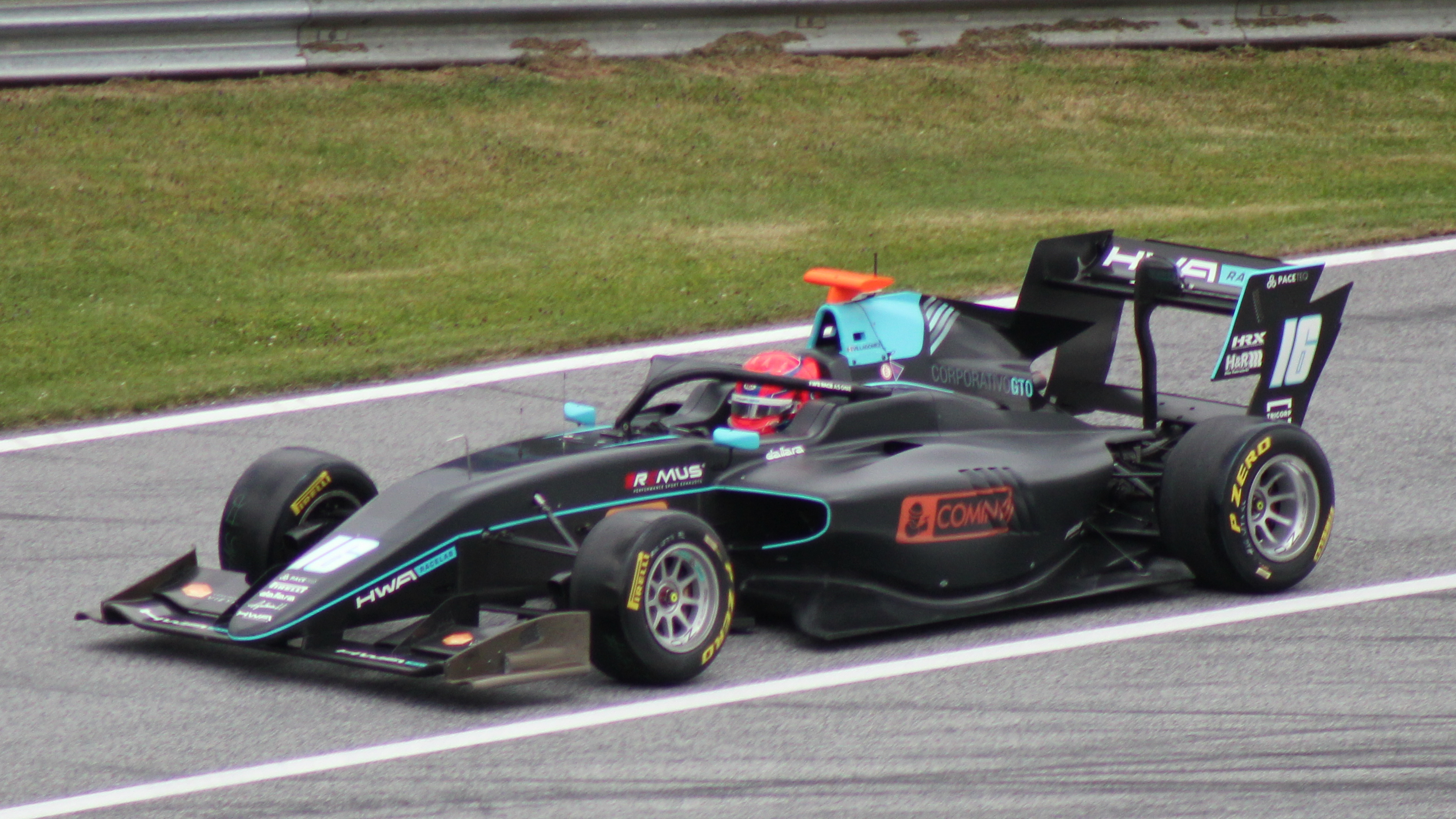
Villagómez driving for HWA Racelab during the 2021 Spielberg Formula 3 round

==== 2021 ====
In 2021, Villagómez made his debut in the FIA Formula 3 Championship for HWA Racelab, racing alongside Matteo Nannini and Oliver Rasmussen, becoming the first driver from Mexico to compete in FIA F3. Unfortunately for Villagómez, he was unable to score any points throughout the campaign, finishing 29th in the standings with a best race result of 13th. He drove for Van Amersfoort Racing in the post-season test.

==== 2022 ====
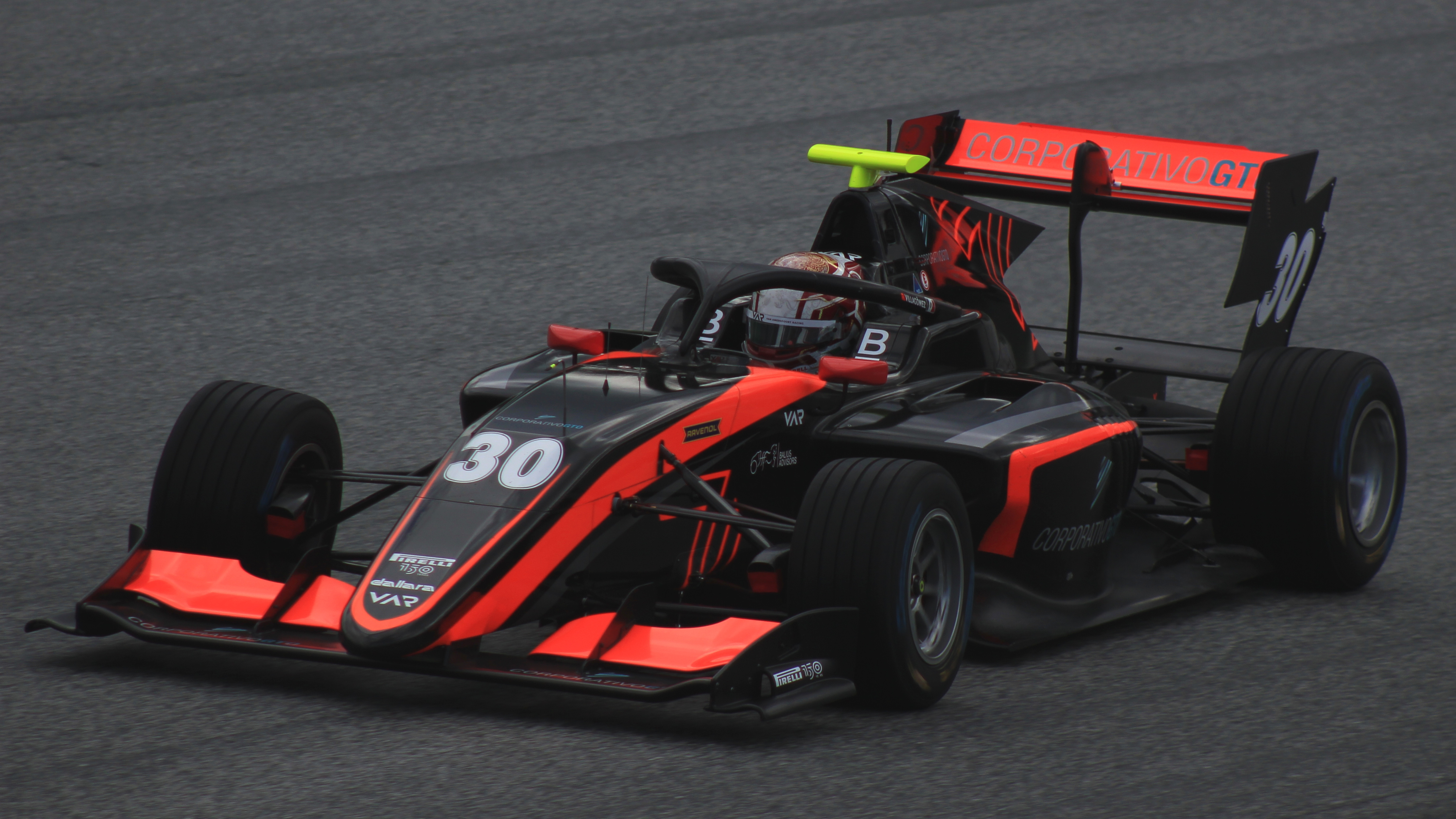
Villagómez driving for Van Amersfoort Racing during the 2022 Spielberg Formula 3 round

The following year, Villagómez returned to Formula 3, partnering Franco Colapinto and Reece Ushijima at Van Amersfoort Racing. In Imola, he achieved his first ever points finish. At the end of the season, he partook in the post-season test remaining with Van Amersfoort Racing in September.

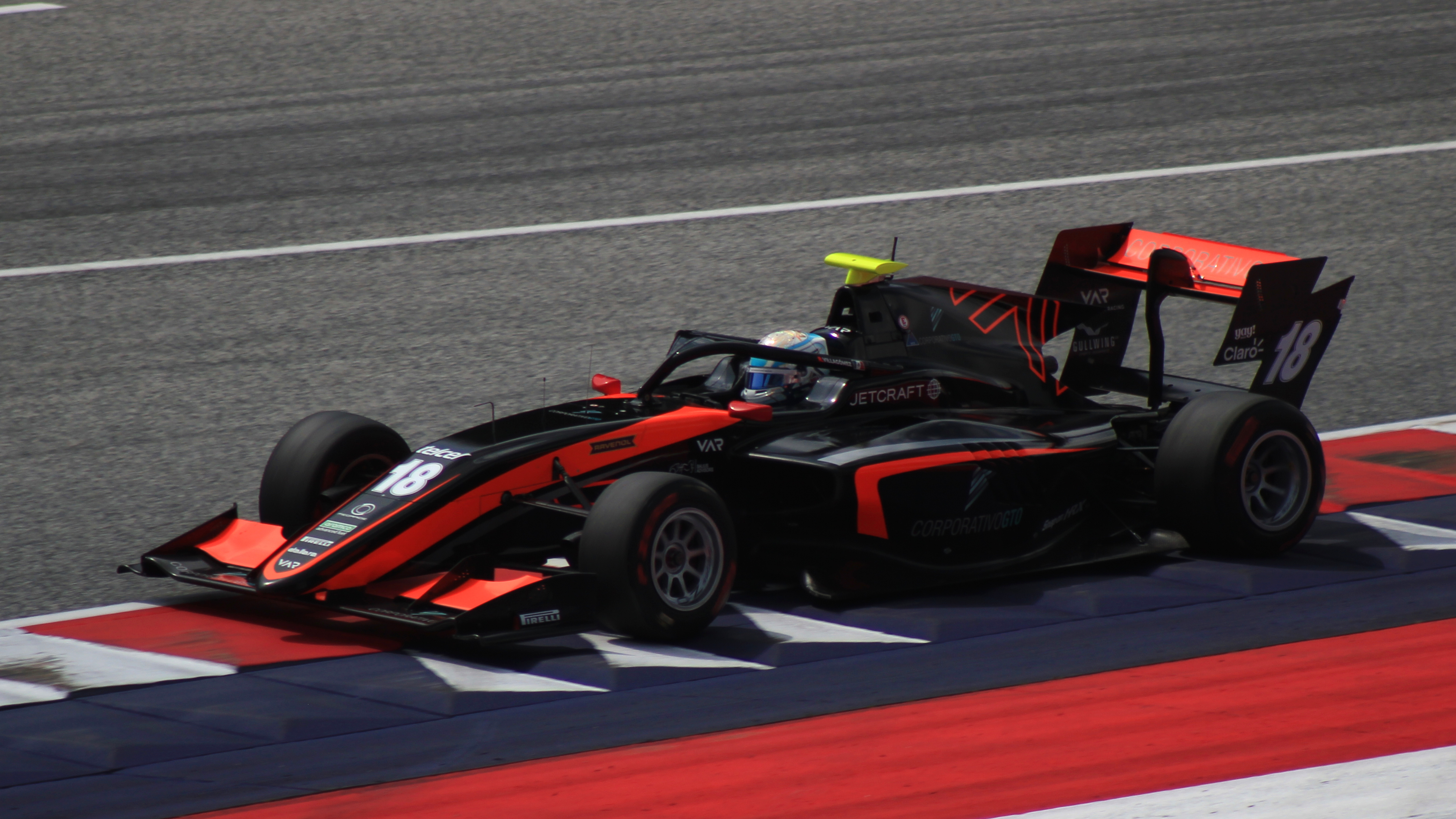
Villagómez driving during the 2023 Spielberg Formula 3 round

==== 2023 ====
Having competed in the Formula Regional Middle East Championship during the winter, Villagómez returned to Formula 3 in 2023, once again driving for Van Amersfoort Racing. The campaign proved lacklustre, as it only yielded a pair of tenth-placed finishes at the season finale in Monza, leading Villagómez to finish 25th overall for the second successive season.

=== FIA Formula 2 Championship ===
Villagómez was invited to partake in the 2022 F2 post-season testing with Van Amersfoort Racing. He returned to the test in 2023, once again driving for VAR at Yas Island.

==== 2024 ====
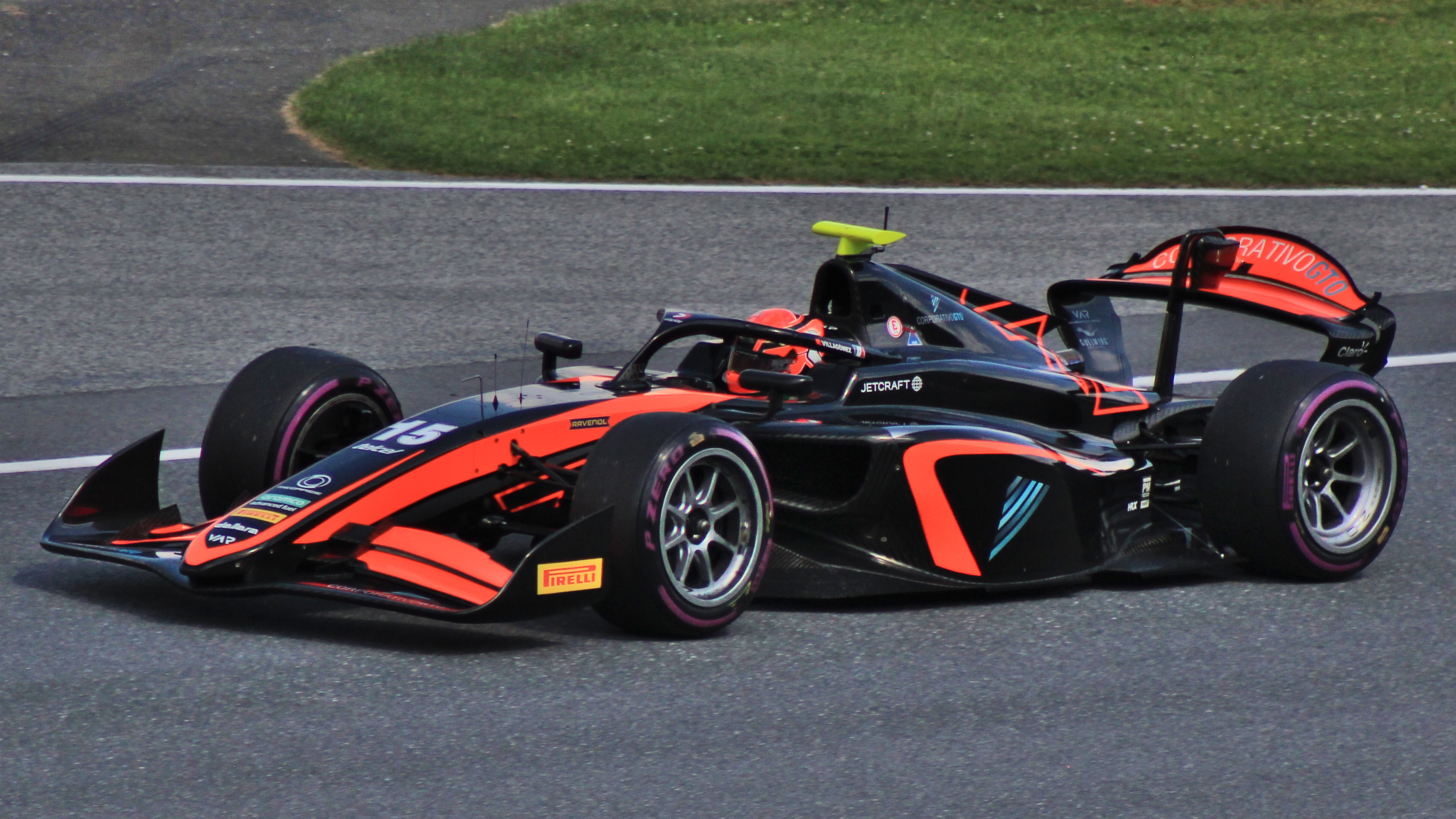
Villagómez driving for Van Amersfoort Racing during the 2024 Spielberg Formula 2 round

In January 2024, Villagómez was announced that he would step up to the 2024 FIA Formula 2 Championship, remaining with Van Amersfoort Racing for a fourth consecutive year, partnering up with Enzo Fittipaldi. The Mexican's best result was seventh place, which he achieved during the Melbourne Feature Race at Albert Park. Other notable performances included an eighth-place finish at Monza and scoring his maiden points with a ninth-place finish in the Jeddah Feature Race. He ended the 2024 season 24th in the standings with 13 points.

==== 2025 ====
Villagómez returned to Van Amersfoort Racing for the 2025 FIA Formula 2 season, partnering GB3 graduate John Bennett. Villagómez achieved his first podium in FIA Formula 2 with a drive from 22nd to third in the sprint race at the Circuit de Barcelona-Catalunya. Villagómez secured another podium by finishing third in the Lusail sprint race. He concluded the 2025 season in 14th place in the Drivers' Championship with 43 points.

==== 2026 ====
Villagómez continued with Van Amersfoort Racing for a third season in 2026, partnering Nico Varrone. This is set to be his final season in the championship.

== Personal life ==
Villagómez's father, Rafael Villagómez Sr., is the CEO of mining company CoMinVi S.A. (Constructora Minera Villagómez), and a majority shareholder of Van Amersfoort Racing.

== Karting record ==
=== Karting career summary ===
Season	Series	Team	Position
2010	SKUSA SuperNationals — S4		60th
2017	WSK Final Cup — OK	Parolin Racing Kart	24th
2018	IAME Euro Series — X30 Senior		1st
2018	IAME International Open — X30 Senior		24th
2018	IAME International Final — X30 Senior		116th
2019	South Garda Winter Cup — KZ2	Birel ART Racing	94th
2019	WSK Super Master Series — KZ2	Birel ART Racing	65th
2019	Trofeo delle Industrie — KZ2	Birel ART Racing	21st
2019	Andrea Margutti Trophy — KZ2	Birel ART Racing	32nd
2019	WSK Euro Series — KZ2	Birel ART Racing	42nd
2019	CIK-FIA International Super Cup — KZ2	Birel ART Racing	117th

== Racing record ==
=== Racing career summary ===
Season	Series	Team	Races	Wins	Poles	F/Laps	Podiums	Points	Position
2020	F4 British Championship	Fortec Motorsport	17	0	0	0	1	47	11th
2020	French F4 Championship	FFSA Academy	18	0	0	0	1	121	6th
2020	Euroformula Open Championship	Drivex School	4	0	0	0	0	0	NC†
2021	FIA Formula 3 Championship	HWA Racelab	20	0	0	0	0	0	29th
2021	Euroformula Open Championship	Van Amersfoort Racing	18	0	0	0	5	135	8th
2021	F3 Asian Championship	BlackArts Racing Team	15	0	0	0	0	6	17th
2022	FIA Formula 3 Championship	Van Amersfoort Racing	18	0	0	0	0	2	25th
2023	Formula Regional Middle East Championship	Pinnacle VAR	12	0	0	0	1	44	13th
2023	FIA Formula 3 Championship	Van Amersfoort Racing	18	0	0	0	0	2	25th
2024	FIA Formula 2 Championship	Van Amersfoort Racing	28	0	0	0	0	13	24th
2025	FIA Formula 2 Championship	Van Amersfoort Racing	27	0	0	0	2	43	14th
2026	FIA Formula 2 Championship	Van Amersfoort Racing	22	0	0	0	3	38	14th*

^{†} As Villagómez was a guest driver, he was ineligible to score points.
* Season still in progress.

=== Complete F4 British Championship results ===
(key) (Races in bold indicate pole position) (Races in italics indicate fastest lap)

Year	Team	1	2	3	4	5	6	7	8	9	10	11	12	13	14	15	16	17	18	19	20	21	22	23	24	25	26	DC	Points
2020	Fortec Motorsport	DON; 1; 6	DON; 2; 3	DON; 3; 9	BHGP; 1 Ret	BHGP; 2; 14	BHGP; 3; 13	OUL; 1	OUL; 2	OUL; 3	KNO; 1; 8	KNO; 2; 7	KNO; 3; 8	THR; 1; 11	THR; 2; 8	THR; 3; 9	SIL; 1	SIL; 2	SIL; 3	CRO; 1; 9	CRO; 2 Ret	SNE; 1; 11	SNE; 2 Ret	SNE; 3 Ret	BHI; 1	BHI; 2	BHI; 3	11th	47

=== Complete French F4 Championship results ===
(key) (Races in bold indicate pole position) (Races in italics indicate fastest lap)

Year	1	2	3	4	5	6	7	8	9	10	11	12	13	14	15	16	17	18	19	20	21	Pos	Points
2020	NOG; 1; 6	NOG; 2; 4	NOG; 3; 5	MAG; 1; 14†	MAG; 2; 10	MAG; 3; 5	ZAN; 1; 5	ZAN; 2; 6	ZAN; 3; 7	LEC1; 1; 6	LEC1; 2; 6	LEC1; 3; 4	SPA; 1; 5	SPA; 2; 4	SPA; 3; 9	LEC2; 1	LEC2; 2	LEC2; 3	LEC3; 1; 7	LEC3; 2; 2	LEC3; 3; 5	6th	121

=== Complete Euroformula Open Championship results ===
(key) (Races in bold indicate pole position; races in italics indicate points for the fastest lap of top ten finishers)

Year	Entrant	1	2	3	4	5	6	7	8	9	10	11	12	13	14	15	16	17	18	19	20	21	22	23	24	DC	Points
2020	Drivex School	HUN; 1	HUN; 2	LEC; 1	LEC; 2	RBR; 1	RBR; 2	MNZ; 1	MNZ; 2	MNZ; 3	MUG; 1	MUG; 2	SPA; 1	SPA; 2	SPA; 3	CAT; 1; 12	CAT; 2; 13	CAT; 3; 12	CAT; 4 Ret							NC†	0
2021	Van Amersfoort Racing	POR; 1; 3	POR; 2; 5	POR; 3; 8	LEC; 1; 4	LEC; 2; 6	LEC; 3; 3	SPA; 1	SPA; 2	SPA; 3	HUN; 1; 2	HUN; 2 Ret	HUN; 3; 2	IMO; 1; 6	IMO; 2; 3	IMO; 3 Ret	RBR; 1; 7	RBR; 2; 8	RBR; 3; 12	MNZ; 1	MNZ; 2	MNZ; 3	CAT; 1; 13	CAT; 2; 11	CAT; 3; 11	8th	135

=== Complete F3 Asian Championship results ===
(key) (Races in bold indicate pole position) (Races in italics indicate the fastest lap of top ten finishers)

Year	Entrant	1	2	3	4	5	6	7	8	9	10	11	12	13	14	15	DC	Points
2021	BlackArts Racing Team	DUB; 1 Ret	DUB; 2 Ret	DUB; 3; 12	ABU; 1; 20	ABU; 2; 19	ABU; 3; 14	ABU; 1 Ret	ABU; 2; 12	ABU; 3; 12	DUB; 1; 12	DUB; 2; 9	DUB; 3; 8	ABU; 1; 11	ABU; 2; 14	ABU; 3; 14	17th	6

=== Complete FIA Formula 3 Championship results ===
(key) (Races in bold indicate pole position; races in italics indicate points for the fastest lap of top ten finishers)

Year	Entrant	1	2	3	4	5	6	7	8	9	10	11	12	13	14	15	16	17	18	19	20	21	DC	Points
2021	HWA Racelab	CAT; 1; 19	CAT; 2; 18	CAT; 3; 28	LEC; 1; 25	LEC; 2; 27	LEC; 3; 23	RBR; 1; 21	RBR; 2; 18	RBR; 3; 19	HUN; 1; 23	HUN; 2; 21	HUN; 3; 24	SPA; 1; 27	SPA; 2; 23	SPA; 3 Ret	ZAN; 1; 22	ZAN; 2; 13	ZAN; 3; 25	SOC; 1; 20	SOC; 2 C	SOC; 3 Ret	29th	0
2022	Van Amersfoort Racing	BHR; SPR; 17	BHR; FEA; 12	IMO; SPR; 9	IMO; FEA; 20	CAT; SPR; 14	CAT; FEA; Ret	SIL; SPR; 26	SIL; FEA; Ret	RBR; SPR; Ret	RBR; FEA; 15	HUN; SPR; 17	HUN; FEA; 21	SPA; SPR; 23	SPA; FEA; 19	ZAN; SPR; 28	ZAN; FEA; Ret	MNZ; SPR; 26	MNZ; FEA; Ret				25th	2
2023	Van Amersfoort Racing	BHR; SPR; Ret	BHR; FEA; 19	MEL; SPR; 14	MEL; FEA; 19	MON; SPR; 16	MON; FEA; 16	CAT; SPR; 27	CAT; FEA; 25	RBR; SPR; Ret	RBR; FEA; 15	SIL; SPR; 20	SIL; FEA; 16	HUN; SPR; 17	HUN; FEA; 17	SPA; SPR; 23	SPA; FEA; 21	MNZ; SPR; 10	MNZ; FEA; 10				25th	2

=== Complete Formula Regional Middle East Championship results ===
(key) (Races in bold indicate pole position) (Races in italics indicate fastest lap)

Year	Entrant	1	2	3	4	5	6	7	8	9	10	11	12	13	14	15	DC	Points
2023	Van Amersfoort Racing	DUB1; 1; 17	DUB1; 2; 11	DUB1; 3; 20	KUW1; 1; 6	KUW1; 2; 5	KUW1; 3 Ret	KUW2; 1; 6	KUW2; 2; 2	KUW2; 3; 14	DUB2; 1 Ret	DUB2; 2; 20	DUB2; 3; 13	ABU; 1	ABU; 2	ABU; 3	13th	44

=== Complete FIA Formula 2 Championship results ===
(key) (Races in bold indicate pole position) (Races in italics indicate fastest lap)

Year	Entrant	1	2	3	4	5	6	7	8	9	10	11	12	13	14	15	16	17	18	19	20	21	22	23	24	25	26	27	28	29	DC	Points
2024	Van Amersfoort Racing	BHR; SPR; 19	BHR; FEA; 12	JED; SPR; 14	JED; FEA; 9	MEL; SPR; 15	MEL; FEA; 7	IMO; SPR; 11	IMO; FEA; 16	MON; SPR; 15	MON; FEA; Ret	CAT; SPR; 17	CAT; FEA; 16	RBR; SPR; 19	RBR; FEA; 16	SIL; SPR; 14	SIL; FEA; 16	HUN; SPR; 11	HUN; FEA; 10	SPA; SPR; 21	SPA; FEA; Ret	MNZ; SPR; 16	MNZ; FEA; 8	BAK; SPR; 16	BAK; FEA; Ret	LSL; SPR; 17	LSL; FEA; Ret	YMC; SPR; 12	YMC; FEA; Ret		24th	13
2025	Van Amersfoort Racing	MEL; SPR; 13	MEL; FEA; C	BHR; SPR; 6	BHR; FEA; 12	JED; SPR; 17	JED; FEA; 17	IMO; SPR; 14	IMO; FEA; Ret	MON; SPR; 18	MON; FEA; 9	CAT; SPR; 3	CAT; FEA; Ret	RBR; SPR; 9	RBR; FEA; 11	SIL; SPR; 16	SIL; FEA; 10	SPA; SPR; 12	SPA; FEA; 14	HUN; SPR; 18	HUN; FEA; 13	MNZ; SPR; 12	MNZ; FEA; 4	BAK; SPR; Ret	BAK; FEA; 7	LSL; SPR; 3	LSL; FEA; 12	YMC; SPR; 15	YMC; FEA; 6		14th	43
2026	Van Amersfoort Racing	MEL; SPR; 13	MEL; FEA; 11	MIA; SPR; Ret	MIA; FEA; Ret	MTL; SPR; Ret	MTL; FEA; Ret	MON; SPR; 16	MON; FEA; 21	CAT; SPR; 17	CAT; FEA; 11	RBR; SPR; 3	RBR; FEA; Ret	SIL; SPR; 3	SIL; FEA; 2	SPA; SPR; 16	SPA; FEA; 6	HUN; SPR; 15	HUN; FEA; Ret	MNZ; SPR; 17	MNZ; FEA; 19	MAD; SPR; 13	MAD; FEA; 14	BAK; SPR; 13	BAK; FEA1; 8	BAK; FEA2; Ret	LSL; SPR	LSL; FEA	YMC; SPR	YMC; FEA	13th*	42*

* Season still in progress.
