= 2024 Monza Formula 2 round =

Motor racing event

(Italy) 2024 Monza Formula 2 round
Round details
- Round 11 of 14 in the 2024 FIA Formula 2 Championship.
- Location: Monza Circuit; Monza, Italy
- Course: Permanent racing facility 5.793 km (3.599 mi)

Sprint Race
- Date: 31 August 2024
- Laps: 21
Podium
First	(United Kingdom) Oliver Bearman	Prema Racing
Second	(France) Victor Martins	ART Grand Prix
Third	(Paraguay) Joshua Dürksen	AIX Racing
Fastest lap
Driver	(France) Victor Martins	ART Grand Prix
- Time: 1:33.086 (on lap 21)

Feature Race
- Date: 1 September 2024
- Laps: 30
Pole position
Driver	(Barbados) Zane Maloney	Rodin Motorsport
Time	1:32.160	
Podium
First	(Brazil) Gabriel Bortoleto	Invicta Racing
Second	(Barbados) Zane Maloney	Rodin Motorsport
Third	(Netherlands) Richard Verschoor	Trident
Fastest lap
Driver	(India) Kush Maini	Invicta Racing
- Time: 1:32.717 (on lap 30)

The 2024 Monza Formula 2 round was a motor racing event held between 30 August and 1 September 2024 at the Monza Circuit. It was the eleventh round of the 2024 Formula 2 Championship and was held in support of the 2024 Italian Grand Prix.

The Feature Race of this round was notable for Gabriel Bortoleto's charge through the field as he won the race from a record-setting 22nd place on the starting grid. This allowed him to cut title rival Isack Hadjar's lead from 35.5 points to 10.5 points reigniting the title race with three rounds to go.

== Driver Changes ==
Following Franco Colapinto's promotion to Formula One, Red Bull Junior Oliver Goethe, who was competing in Formula 3, was promoted to the no. 12 MP Motorsport car.

Niels Koolen took the no. 25 AIX Racing car, previously driven by Taylor Barnard, after the latter was announced as a full-time Formula E driver for next season.

== Classification ==
=== Qualifying ===
Pos.	No.	Driver	Entrant	Time	Grid SR	Grid FR
1	5	(Barbados) Zane Maloney	Rodin Motorsport	1:32.160	9	1
2	20	(France) Isack Hadjar	Campos Racing	+0.089	7	2
3	17	(Estonia) Paul Aron	Hitech Pulse-Eight	+0.162	6	3
4	11	(Norway) Dennis Hauger	MP Motorsport	+0.181	5	4
5	1	(France) Victor Martins	ART Grand Prix	+0.188	4	5
6	4	(Italy) Andrea Kimi Antonelli	Prema Racing	+0.214	15^{1}	6
7	21	(Spain) Pepe Martí	Campos Racing	+0.348	3	7
8	3	(United Kingdom) Oliver Bearman	Prema Racing	+0.359	8^{2}	8
9	16	(Belgium) Amaury Cordeel	Hitech Pulse-Eight	+0.452	2	9
10	14	(Brazil) Enzo Fittipaldi	Van Amersfoort Racing	+0.460	1	10
11	24	(Paraguay) Joshua Dürksen	AIX Racing	+0.468	10	11
12	12	(Germany) Oliver Goethe	MP Motorsport	+0.512	11	12
13	2	(United Kingdom) Zak O'Sullivan	ART Grand Prix	+0.565	12	13
14	7	(United States) Jak Crawford	DAMS Lucas Oil	+0.620	13	14
15	9	(India) Kush Maini	Invicta Racing	+0.664	14	15
16	15	(Mexico) Rafael Villagómez	Van Amersfoort Racing	+0.726	16	16
17	6	(Japan) Ritomo Miyata	Rodin Motorsport	+0.736	17	17
18	8	(United States) Juan Manuel Correa	DAMS Lucas Oil	+0.796	18	18
19	22	(Netherlands) Richard Verschoor	Trident	+0.816	19	19
20	23	(Czech Republic) Roman Staněk	Trident	+1.031	20	20
21	25	(Netherlands) Niels Koolen	AIX Racing	+2.081	21	21
107% time: 1:38.611 (+6.451)
—	10	(Brazil) Gabriel Bortoleto	Invicta Racing	+19.647	22^{3}	22^{3}

- ^1 - Andrea Kimi Antonelli received two separate five-place grid penalties for technical nonconformities involving the use of dry ice, one from Silverstone and the other at Spa.
- ^2 - Oliver Bearman received a five-place grid penalty for causing a collision in the previous round.
- ^3 - Gabriel Bortoleto crashed out during qualifying and could not set a meaningful time. He was given permission from the stewards to start both races from the last grid position.

=== Sprint race ===
Pos.	No.	Driver	Entrant	Laps	Time/Retired	Grid	Points
1	3	(United Kingdom) Oliver Bearman	Prema Racing	21	35:37.225	8	10
2	1	(France) Victor Martins	ART Grand Prix	21	+1.694	4	8 (1)
3	24	(Paraguay) Joshua Dürksen	AIX Racing	21	+7.254	10	6
4	21	(Spain) Pepe Martí	Campos Racing	21	+12.880	3	5
5	5	(Barbados) Zane Maloney	Rodin Motorsport	21	+13.442	9	4
6	7	(United States) Jak Crawford	DAMS Lucas Oil	21	+13.486	13	3
7	14	(Brazil) Enzo Fittipaldi	Van Amersfoort Racing	21	+13.587	1	2
8^{1}	11	(Norway) Dennis Hauger	MP Motorsport	21	+14.840^{1}	5	0.5^{1}
8^{1}	10	(Brazil) Gabriel Bortoleto	Invicta Racing	21	+14.840^{1}	22	0.5^{1}
10	20	(France) Isack Hadjar	Campos Racing	21	+16.126	7	
11	9	(India) Kush Maini	Invicta Racing	21	+17.120	14	
12	16	(Belgium) Amaury Cordeel	Hitech Pulse-Eight	21	+19.164	2	
13	6	(Japan) Ritomo Miyata	Rodin Motorsport	21	+22.808	17	
14	22	(Netherlands) Richard Verschoor	Trident	21	+23.376	19	
15	23	(Czech Republic) Roman Staněk	Trident	21	+24.990	20	
16	15	(Mexico) Rafael Villagómez	Van Amersfoort Racing	21	+29.441	16	
17	8	(United States) Juan Manuel Correa	DAMS Lucas Oil	21	+29.713	18	
18	4	(Italy) Andrea Kimi Antonelli	Prema Racing	21	+35.510	15	
19	25	(Netherlands) Niels Koolen	AIX Racing	21	+48.820	21	
20	17	(Estonia) Paul Aron	Hitech Pulse-Eight	20	+1 Lap^{2}	6	
DNF	12	(Germany) Oliver Goethe	MP Motorsport	0	Collision	11	
DNF	2	(United Kingdom) Zak O'Sullivan	ART Grand Prix	0	Collision^{3}	12	
Fastest lap set by (France) Victor Martins: 1:33.086 (lap 21)

Notes

- ^1 - Dennis Hauger and Gabriel Bortoleto finished the race in a dead heat. They shared the point for eighth place, receiving 0.5 points each.
- ^2 - Paul Aron received a 10-second time penalty for causing a collision. It did not affect his position.
- ^3 - Zak O'Sullivan was handed a 5-second time penalty for a false start. It did not affect his position, as he crashed out.

=== Feature race ===
Pos.	No.	Driver	Entrant	Laps	Time/Retired	Grid	Points
1	10	(Brazil) Gabriel Bortoleto	Invicta Racing	30	50:30.337	22	25
2	5	(Barbados) Zane Maloney	Rodin Motorsport	30	+9.436	1	18 (2)
3	22	(Netherlands) Richard Verschoor	Trident	30	+11.628	19	15
4	4	(Italy) Andrea Kimi Antonelli	Prema Racing	30	+14.173	6	12
5	24	(Paraguay) Joshua Dürksen	AIX Racing	30	+14.558	11	10 (1)
6	1	(France) Victor Martins	ART Grand Prix	30	+15.047	5	8
7	3	(United Kingdom) Oliver Bearman	Prema Racing	30	+15.399	8	6
8	15	(Mexico) Rafael Villagómez	Van Amersfoort Racing	30	+15.753	16	4
9	7	(United States) Jak Crawford	DAMS Lucas Oil	30	+17.054	14	2
10	14	(Brazil) Enzo Fittipaldi	Van Amersfoort Racing	30	+17.372	10	1
11	20	(France) Isack Hadjar	Campos Racing	30	+17.864	2	
12	21	(Spain) Pepe Martí	Campos Racing	30	+18.600	7	
13	2	(United Kingdom) Zak O'Sullivan	ART Grand Prix	30	+25.424	13	
14	6	(Japan) Ritomo Miyata	Rodin Motorsport	30	+31.720^{1}	17	
15	9	(India) Kush Maini	Invicta Racing	30	+46.981	15	
16	12	(Germany) Oliver Goethe	MP Motorsport	30	+51.605	12	
17	23	(Czech Republic) Roman Staněk	Trident	30	+1:02.455	20	
18	16	(Belgium) Amaury Cordeel	Hitech Pulse-Eight	30	+1:21.694	9	
19	25	(Netherlands) Niels Koolen	AIX Racing	30	+1:26.773	21	
DNF	8	(United States) Juan Manuel Correa	DAMS Lucas Oil	16	Collision damage	18	
DNF	11	(Norway) Dennis Hauger	MP Motorsport	7	Collision	4	
DNF	17	(Estonia) Paul Aron	Hitech Pulse-Eight	0	Collision	3	
Fastest lap set by (India) Kush Maini: 1:32.717 (lap 30)

Notes

- ^1 - Ritomo Miyata received a 10-second time penalty for causing a collision and a 5-second time penalty for failing to follow the Race Director's instructions.

== Standings after the event ==
Drivers' Championship standings

	Pos.	Driver	Points
	1	(France) Isack Hadjar	165
	2	(Brazil) Gabriel Bortoleto	154.5
1	3	(Barbados) Zane Maloney	135
1	4	(Estonia) Paul Aron	124
	5	(United States) Jak Crawford	105

Teams' Championship standings

	Pos.	Team	Points
1	1	(United Kingdom) Invicta Racing	228.5
1	2	(Spain) Campos Racing	208
	3	(Netherlands) MP Motorsport	179.5
1	4	(New Zealand) Rodin Motorsport	164
1	5	(United Kingdom) Hitech Pulse-Eight	153

- Note: Only the top five positions are included for both sets of standings.

== See also ==
- 2024 Italian Grand Prix
- 2024 Monza Formula 3 round

Previous round: 2024 Spa-Francorchamps Formula 2 round	FIA Formula 2 Championship; 2024 season	Next round: 2024 Baku Formula 2 round
Previous round: 2023 Monza Formula 2 round	Monza Formula 2 round	Next round: 2025 Monza Formula 2 round
