= Zak O'Sullivan =

British racing driver (born 2005)

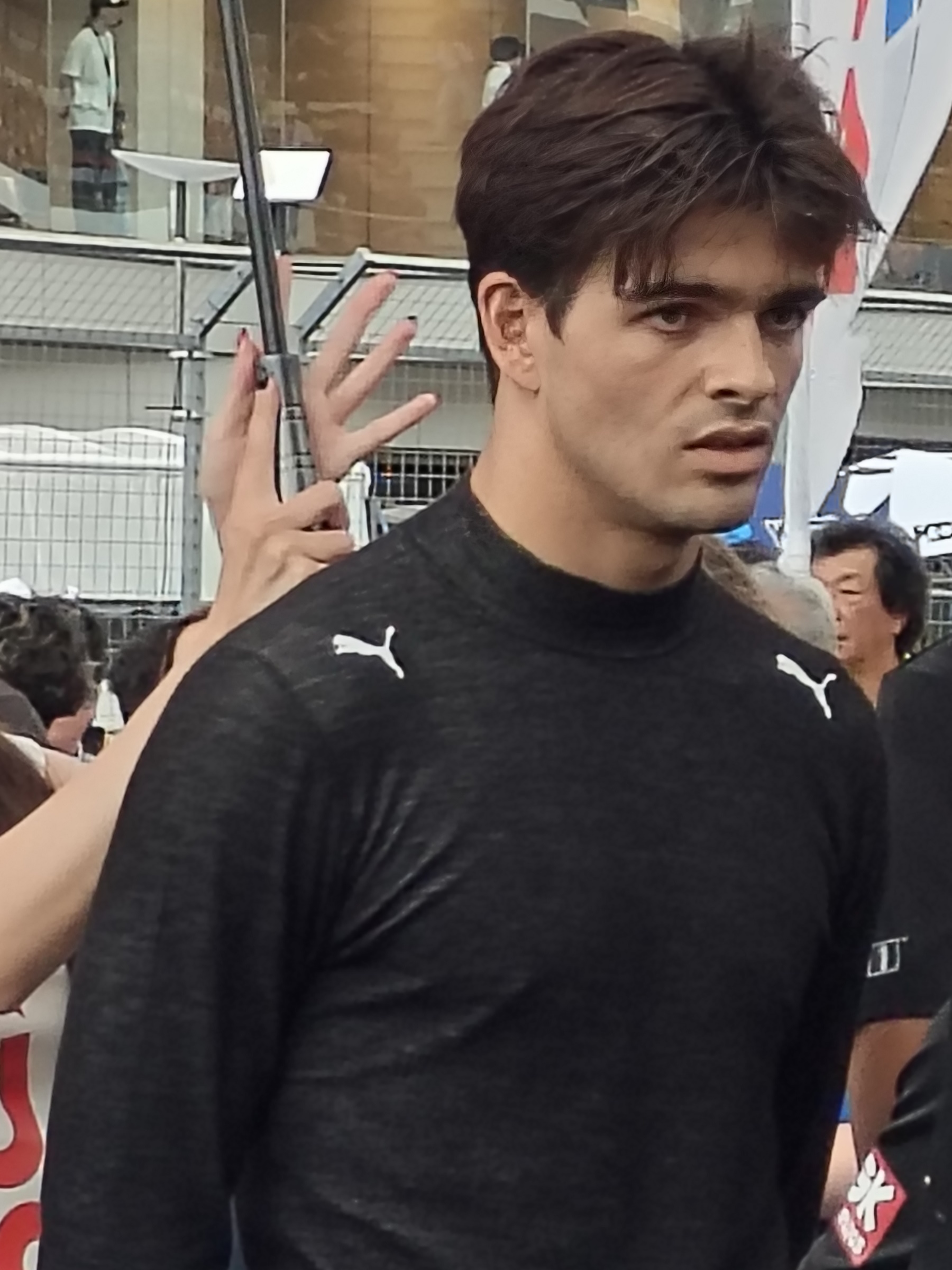
- O'Sullivan in 2026
- Nationality: (United Kingdom) British
- Born: 6 February 2005 (age 21) Chelsea, London, England

Super GT - GT300 career
- Debut season: 2025
- Current team: CarGuy MKS Racing
- Categorisation: FIA Gold
- Car number: 7
- Starts: 13
- Wins: 1
- Podiums: 4
- Poles: 2
- Best finish: 3rd in 2025

Super Formula career
- Debut season: 2025
- Current team: Team Impul
- Car number: 19
- Former teams: Kondo Racing
- Starts: 22
- Wins: 0
- Podiums: 3
- Poles: 1
- Fastest laps: 0
- Best finish: 15th in 2025

Previous series
- 2024; 2022–2023; 2021; 2020; 2019: FIA Formula 2; FIA Formula 3; GB3; F4 British; Ginetta Junior

Championship titles
- 2021: GB3 Championship

Awards
- 2021: Aston Martin Autosport BRDC Award; The Jim Clark Trophy

Zak O'Sullivan (born 6 February 2005) is a British racing driver who currently competes in Super Formula for Team Impul, in Super GT for CarGuy MKS Racing. He is also set to compete in Formula E for Paysafe Envision Racing.

O'Sullivan is the champion of the 2021 GB3 Championship and the 2019 Ginetta Junior, 2020 British F4 and the 2023 Formula 3 runner-up. He was promoted to Formula 2 in 2024 with ART Grand Prix, winning two races. O'Sullivan was awarded the Aston Martin Autosport BRDC Award for 2021, and was previously a member of the Williams Driver Academy.

== Junior racing career ==
=== Karting (2014–2018) ===
Having taken up the sport when he was just nine years old, O'Sullivan started his competitive karting career in 2014, where he won the British Super One Rookie Championship. After competing in the national Super 1 Championship in 2015, he won the MSA Kartmasters British Grand Prix, and in 2017, he first raced in Europe, coming twelfth in the CIK-FIA European Championship with Ricky Flynn Motorsport. O'Sullivan remained with the team in 2018 and achieved his best international karting result by finishing second in the German Karting Championship in the junior class. That same year he also made his first and only appearance in the Karting World Championship.

=== Ginetta Junior (2019) ===
In 2019, O'Sullivan made his car racing debut in the Ginetta Junior Championship with Douglas Motorsport. He scored five podiums in the first ten races of the season, however his results improved after he made a switch to R Racing in the middle of the season. O'Sullivan won two races at Snetterton and one at Thruxton, and thanks to a podium streak that lasted for nine consecutive races he finished second in the championship, which made him the highest-placed rookie.

=== Formula 4 (2020) ===
For the 2020 season, O'Sullivan moved up to the F4 British Championship, partnering Christian Mansell and Matías Zagazeta at Carlin. He started the season off strongly, with a win at the season-opening round at Donington Park and two victories at the Brands Hatch Grand Prix Circuit. Throughout the following three rounds however, O'Sullivan was overtaken in the standings by Luke Browning, who had won all three races at Oulton Park and another two at Knockhill. O'Sullivan bounced back with a run of nine consecutive podium finishes, which included four race wins as well as four second places. At the final race of the season, O'Sullivan won the race and was initially crowned champion. However, it turned out that, due to a red flag, only half the number of points were distributed, meaning that O'Sullivan fell behind Browning in the championship and became vice-champion, only three points behind his rival.

=== GB3 (2021) ===
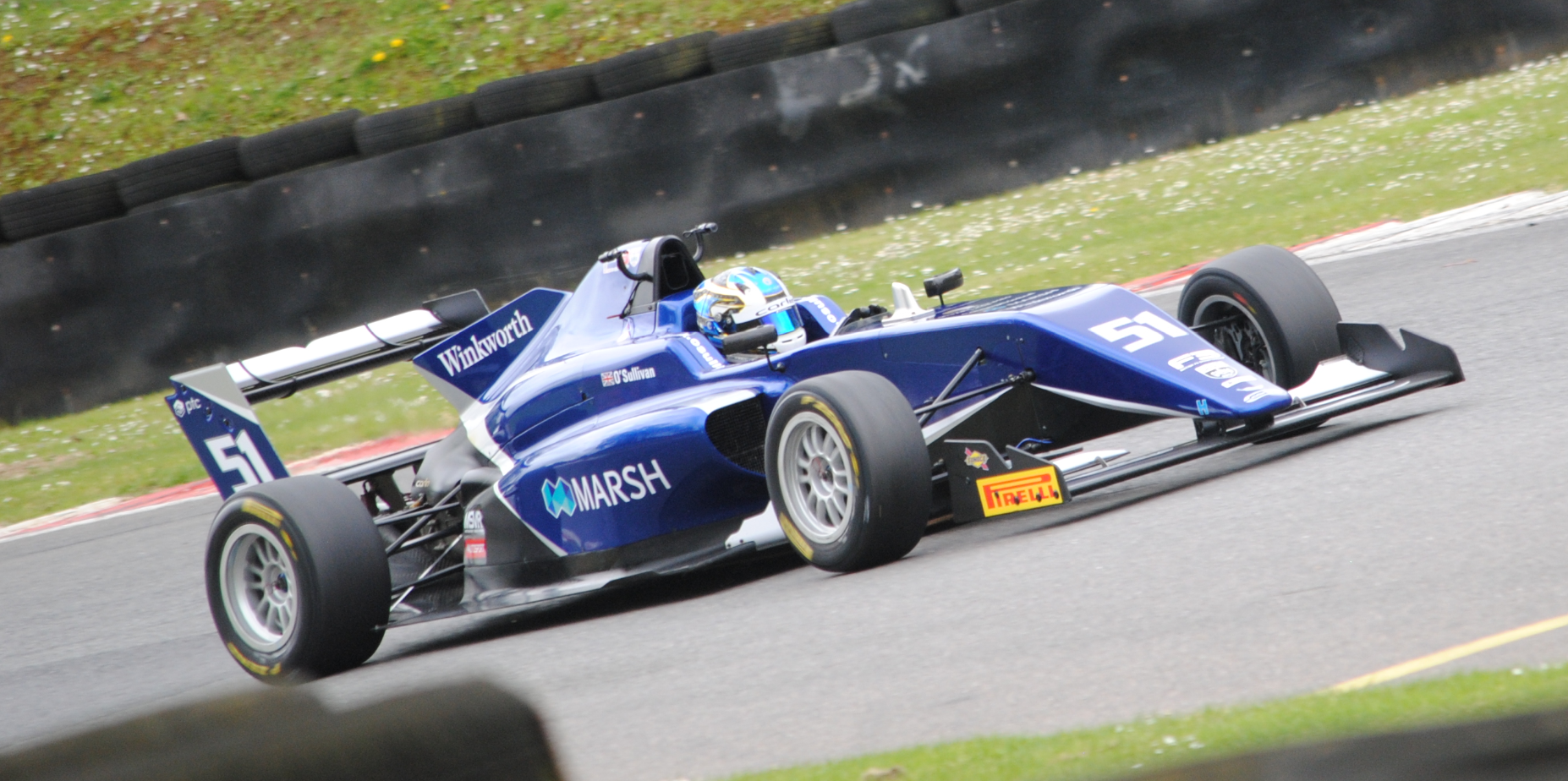
O'Sullivan at Brands Hatch during the 2021 GB3 Championship

O'Sullivan remained with Carlin for 2021, progressing to the GB3 Championship with his previous teammate Christian Mansell and American Bryce Aron. His first race win in the series came at the second race of the first round at Brands Hatch, which led to him taking an early championship lead. A pair of victories from Reece Ushijima at the next round put O'Sullivan's lead under threat, but the Brit was able to get away from his championship rivals by winning the first two races of the third weekend at Donington Park, having started both from pole position. He extended his advantage further by finishing second twice at both Spa-Francorchamps and Snetterton respectively, and would get back to winning ways in the reversed-grid race in Silverstone. Another victory followed in the first race at Oulton Park, and a sixth place in race 3, one where he overtook ten of his rivals, put O'Sullivan on the cusp of winning the title. He would go on to control the first race of the final round, thus clinching the title in dominant fashion.

For his efforts, O'Sullivan was nominated for the 2021 Autosport BRDC Award, and in February 2022, received that honour ahead of Jonny Edgar, Louis Foster and Oliver Bearman. In addition, in December 2021, the BRDC awarded O'Sullivan with the Jim Clark Trophy for winning the GB3 title.

=== FIA Formula 3 (2022–2023) ===
==== 2022 ====
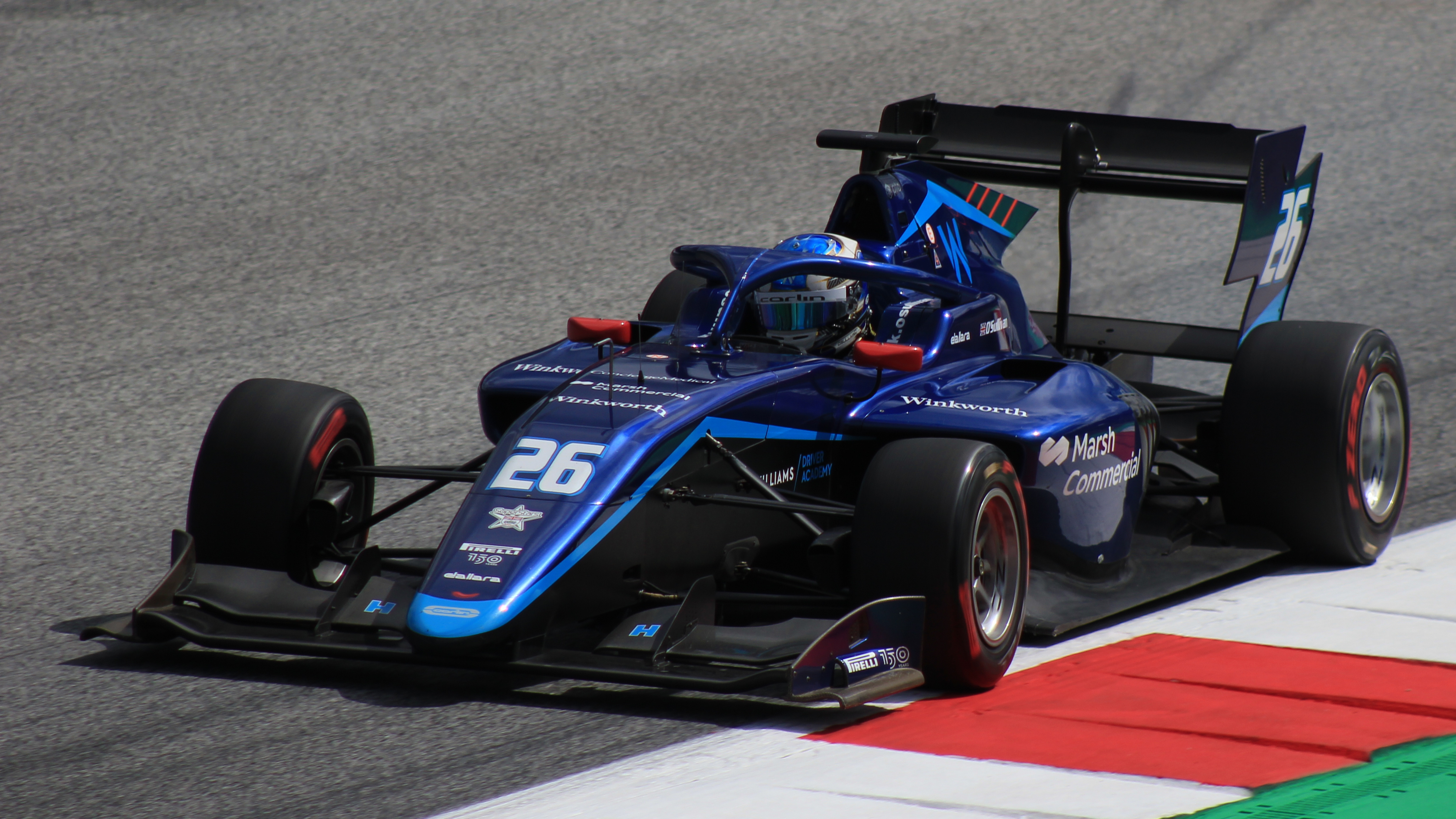
O'Sullivan driving the Dallara F3 2019 during the 2022 Spielberg Formula 3 round

For 2022, O'Sullivan once again reunited with Carlin to contest the FIA Formula 3 Championship. O'Sullivan qualified 12th for reverse pole for the sprint race in Bahrain. He would slip back, but managed to score points in sixth place. In Imola, he would qualify eighth, but was penalised three places for the sprint race for impeding Reece Ushijima. His sprint race would be disappointing, losing the car and crashing out on lap 9. In the feature race, he stayed out of trouble and brought sixth place. O'Sullivan had a poor round in Barcelona scoring no points, but bounced back in Silverstone with an unexpected pole position, describing it as "really nice". He would lose his lead to Arthur Leclerc on Sunday, but was able to narrowly hold off Ollie Bearman for second, scoring his first podium in the category.

Another positive surprise came in the Budapest feature race. Having changed to dry tyres as the damp conditions were disappearing in the last third of the feature race, O'Sullivan was able to make his way up, overtaking car after car to finish fourth place by race's end. He had a disappointing Spa-Francorchamps round despite starting from reverse pole, as he damaged his front wing during a first lap battle with Juan Manuel Correa. After qualifying tenth and starting third in the sprint at Zandvoort O'Sullivan took his second podium which ended up being his final points finish of the season. In the feature race, he ran in tenth for majority of the race but was overtaken by Bearman in the final stages, and O'Sullivan was given a penalty for contact with him, dropping him to the back. After failing to score points during the Monza finale, O'Sullivan ended his rookie campaign 11th in the standings with 54 points and two podiums, whilst helping Carlin to seventh place and its best year yet. During the F3 Prize Giving ceremony, O'Sullivan won the Comeback Of The Year for his comethru drive in Budapest.

==== 2023 ====
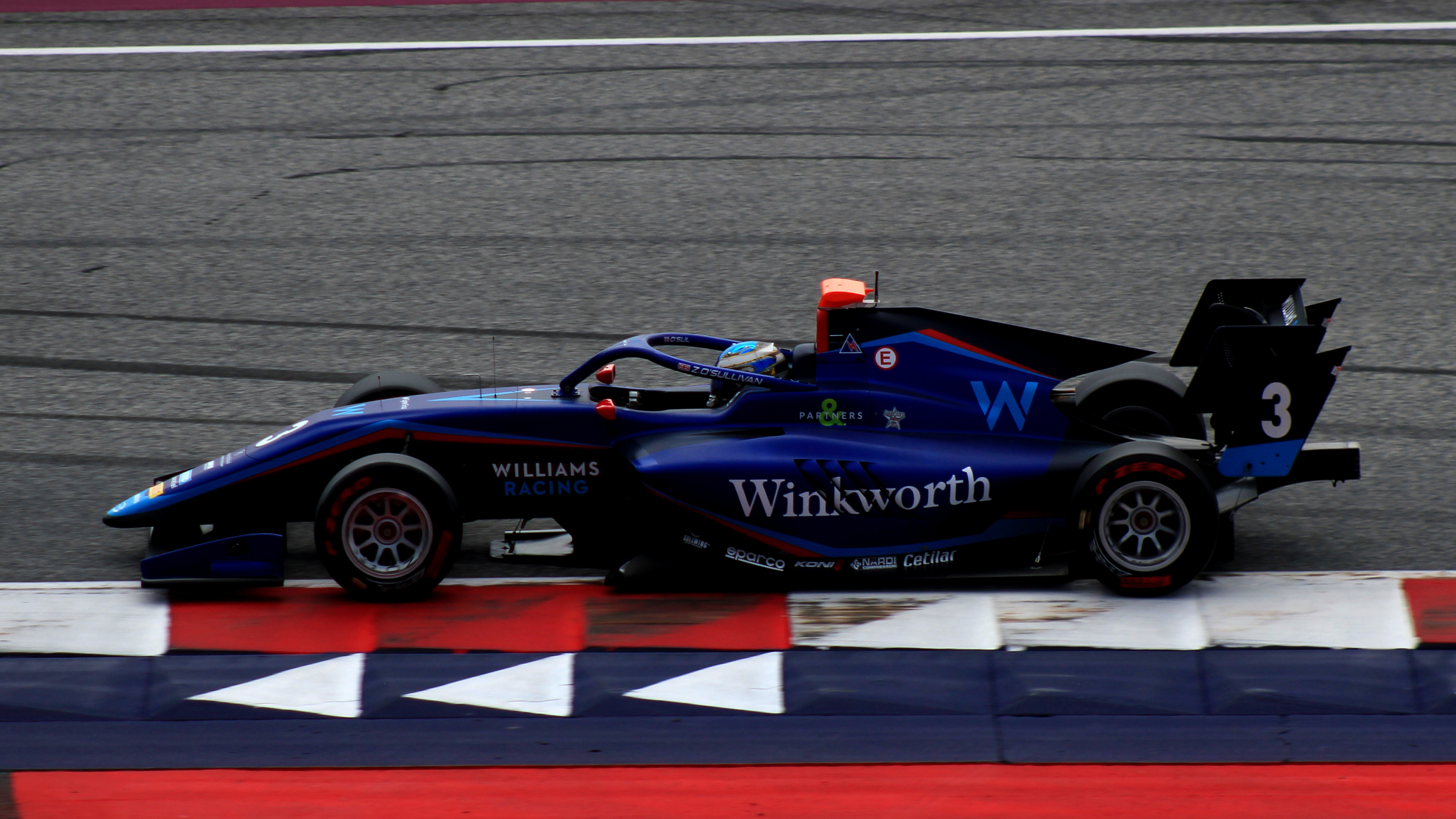
O'Sullivan driving for Prema Racing during the 2023 Austrian round

O'Sullivan drove for Prema Racing on all three days during the post-season test at the Jerez Circuit. In November 2022, it was announced he would be joining Prema for the 2023 F3 season. O'Sullivan had a disappointing start to the season as he failed to score points during the first round in Bahrain. O'Sullivan qualified in fifth for Melbourne, and got his first podium of the season by finishing second in the sprint race. However, following the disqualification of Franco Colapinto, who had originally finished first, O'Sullivan was promoted to race winner and thus scored his first victory in Formula 3. He remained in fifth place for the feature race. O'Sullivan had another tough round in Monaco, qualifying 13th which limited points opportunities at a circuit where overtaking was tough. Despite that, he made a strong getaway during the feature race and an incident ahead secured him seventh place at the end.

In Barcelona, O'Sullivan qualified on reverse pole, and would fend off fellow Williams Academy member Luke Browning to secure his second win. He added more points to his tally in the feature race, finishing eighth. In Austria, O'Sullivan qualified in sixth but was penalised three places during the sprint race for impeding. Despite the setback, O'Sullivan would charge forward to fourth. Sunday was much better, O'Sullivan mastered his way into the lead, taking advantage of his rivals fighting and breakthrough for his first Formula 3 feature race win. O'Sullivan had a difficult weekend in his Silverstone home race, failing to score points. In Hungary, O'Sullivan stormed to pole position, his first of the year. His sprint race was compromised by making contact with Nikola Tsolov, which forced the Briton to pit for a new front wing and was classified 21st. He then went on to dominate the feature race from pole, equalling the F3 win record with his fourth victory, propelling him to second in the standings.

O'Sullivan qualified sixth in Spa-Francorchamps, but his races would be unlucky. During the sprint race, he impressed by finishing fourth, but was penalised for passing Hugh Barter by gaining time off-track, dropping to 15th. His feature race started on the wrong foot, starting on the dry tyres which proved to be the wrong choice. He could not recover from there, ending the race in 12th, and knocked himself out of title contention. O'Sullivan qualified sixth for the Monza season finale. After a penalty demoted him out of the points in the sprint race, he bounced back with a second place finish in the feature race. The result meant that O'Sullivan finished runner-up in the standings, scoring 119 points, four wins, one other podium and one pole.

=== FIA Formula 2 (2024) ===
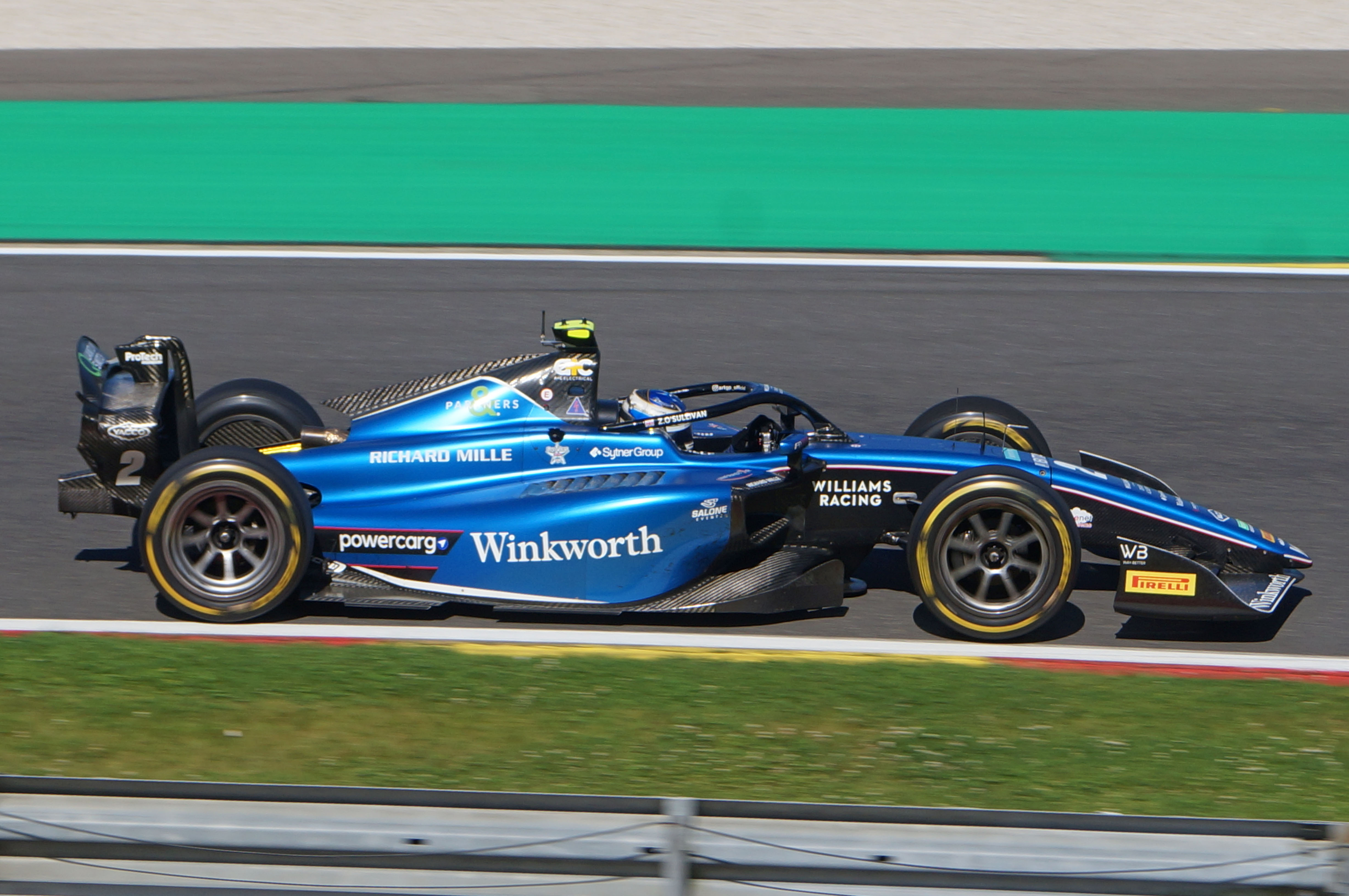
O'Sullivan driving at Spa-Francorchamps where he took his second victory.

In October 2023, O'Sullivan was announced to step up to Formula 2 with ART Grand Prix for the 2024 season, teaming up with 2022 FIA Formula 3 champion Victor Martins. Despite it being his rookie year, he stated that he saw "no reason why [fighting for the championship] shouldn't be possible". Unfortunately, ART was one of many teams to struggle with the new-for-2024 F2 car and a championship challenge didn't materialise. O'Sullivan qualified sixth on his debut in Bahrain and finished seventh on his debut during the sprint race. A strong start moved him to second in the feature race, but faded slightly late in the race to finish fourth. A difficult round followed in Jeddah, where he stalled in the sprint race and spun out late in the feature race. In Melbourne, O'Sullivan managed to avoid the chaos and claim a point in eighth. A scruffy feature race followed with contact with Roman Staněk on the opening lap, before his race ended after colliding with Joshua Dürksen.

A pointless weekend followed in Imola, before O'Sullivan earned his breakthrough in Monaco. Starting 15th, O'Sullivan ran long on the harder tyres, and pitted right before the virtual safety car was deployed on lap 40. Due to this, he was able to jump the entire field, including net race leader Isack Hadjar to secure his first Formula 2 win. In Austria, starting 12th, a long stint on the harder tyres allowed him to score points in the feature race with ninth. In Silverstone, O'Sullivan was making a charge in the sprint from 14th and made his way to the points until he tipped teammate Martins into a spin, taking both out of the race. He narrowly missed points with 11th in the feature race. Qualifying on reverse pole for the sprint in Spa-Francorchamps, he controlled proceedings and won the shortened sprint race affected by heavy rain. He ended the feature race in a strong fourth place.

Unfortunately for O'Sullivan, he pulled out of the championship following the Monza round, meaning that he did not see out the remaining three rounds of the season. Media coverage suggested the end of O'Sullivan's championship was connected to an issue with ART but he has since confirmed it was purely down to funding, and he had a great relationship with the team. He would eventually place 16th in the overall standings with two wins and 59 points.

=== Formula One ===
In February 2022, it was announced O'Sullivan would join the Williams Driver Academy. During late October, O'Sullivan got his first taste of F1 machinery, driving the Aston Martin AMR21 at the Silverstone Circuit as part of his reward for claiming the Autosport BRDC Award the previous year.

O'Sullivan debuted in Formula One machinery while driving the Williams FW45 during free practice (FP1) at the 2023 Abu Dhabi Grand Prix. He ended the session in 18th place, 1.3 seconds off the fastest time. He returned driving the FW45 during the young drivers' test, racking up 50 laps. O'Sullivan departed the academy after 2024 following his switch to Super Formula.

== Super Formula and Super GT career ==
=== Super Formula (2025–) ===
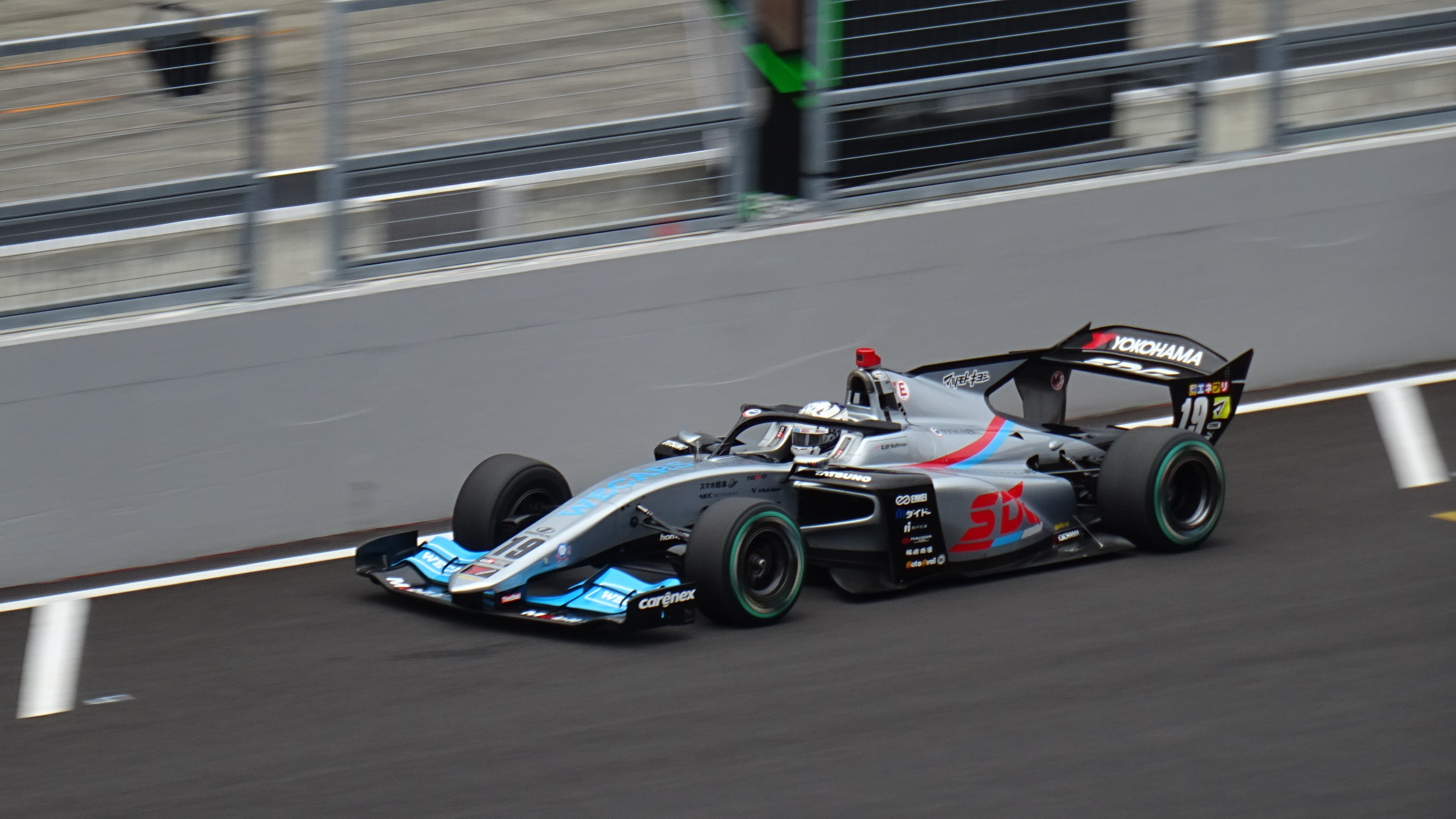
O'Sullivan at Suzuka Circuit in 2026

In December 2024, O'Sullivan took part in a Super Formula test at the Suzuka Circuit, later stating that he "considered [it] an option for 2025".

==== 2025 season ====
Shortly after his test, O'Sullivan was confirmed to be competing in the 2025 Super Formula Championship with Kondo Racing.

==== 2026 season ====
O'Sullivan switched to the one-car Team Impul for the 2026 season.

=== Super GT (2025–) ===
==== 2025 ====
O'Sullivan announced that he would make his debut and compete in Super GT GT300 Class with new entry CarGuy MKS Racing, racing with the Ferrari 296 GT3 alongside Rikuto Kobayashi.

==== 2026 ====
O'Sullivan remained with CarGuy MKS Racing as he continued to race in the 2026 Super GT GT300 Class.

== Formula E ==
O'Sullivan made his Formula E debut during the rookie free practice session at the Jeddah ePrix, driving for Envision Racing. Additionally, he was also named as their simulator driver for the 2024–25 season. He was picked by Envision to represent the team once again during the Berlin rookie test following the Berlin ePrix. For the 2025–26 season, the team fielded him for the rookie session during the Miami e Prix, and the rookie test at the Madrid ePrix.

=== Envision Racing (2027–) ===
==== 2026–27 season ====
O'Sullivan is set to be promoted to a full-time seat at Envision Racing for the 2026–27 season, partnering Maximilian Günther.

== Personal life ==
O'Sullivan was born in Chelsea in London and moved to Cheltenham when he was eight years old. His racing hero is seven-time Formula One champion Michael Schumacher.

== Karting record ==
=== Karting career summary ===
Season	Series	Team	Position
2014	Clay Pigeon Kart Club — Honda Cadet		18th
2015	LGM Series — IAME Cadet		21st
2015	Super 1 National Championship — IAME Cadet		34th
2015	Formula Kart Stars — Super Cadet		7th
2015	BNL Karting Series — Rotax Micro		6th
2016	LGM Series — IAME Cadet		14th
2016	Super 1 National Championship — IAME Cadet	Fusion Motorsport	8th
2016	ROK Cup International Final — Mini ROK		23rd
2016	MSA Kartmasters British Grand Prix — IAME Cadet		**1st**
2017	WSK Champions Cup — OKJ	Ricky Flynn Motorsport	8th
2017	Trofeo delle Industrie — OKJ	Ricky Flynn Motorsport	28th
2017	WSK Super Master Series — OKJ	Ricky Flynn Motorsport	9th
2017	CIK-FIA European Championship — OKJ	Ricky Flynn Motorsport	12th
2017	CIK-FIA World Championship — OKJ	Ricky Flynn Motorsport	38th
2018	WSK Champions Cup — OKJ	Ricky Flynn Motorsport	4th
2018	South Garda Winter Cup — OKJ	Ricky Flynn Motorsport	31st
2018	Andrea Margutti Trophy — OKJ	Ricky Flynn Motorsport	6th
2018	WSK Super Master Series — OKJ	Ricky Flynn Motorsport	6th
2018	German Karting Championship — OKJ	Ricky Flynn Motorsport	**2nd**
2018	CIK-FIA European Championship — OKJ	Ricky Flynn Motorsport	11th
2018	CIK-FIA World Championship — OKJ	Ricky Flynn Motorsport	28th

=== Complete CIK-FIA Karting European Championship results ===
(key) (Races in bold indicate pole position) (Races in italics indicate fastest lap)

Year	Team	Class	1	2	3	4	5	6	7	8	9	10	DC	Points
2017	Ricky Flynn Motorsport	OKJ	SAR; QH; 3	SAR; R 5	CAY; QH; 12	CAY; R 7	LEM; QH; 20	LEM; R 28	ALA; QH; 38	ALA; R DNQ	KRI; QH; 24	KRI; R 10	12th	34
2018	Ricky Flynn Motorsport	OKJ	SAR; QH; DSQ	SAR; R DSQ	PFI; QH; 12	PFI; R 23	AMP; QH; 16	AMP; R 7	ESS; QH; 8	ESS; R 4			11th	25

== Racing record ==
=== Racing career summary ===
Season	Series	Team	Races	Wins	Poles	F. Laps	Podiums	Points	Position
2019	Ginetta Junior Championship	Douglas Motorsport	10	0	1	1	5	591	**2nd**
2019	Ginetta Junior Championship	R Racing	16	3	3	3	9	591	**2nd**
2020	F4 British Championship	Carlin	26	9	3	4	18	408.5	**2nd**
2021	GB3 Championship	Carlin	24	7	5	8	14	535	**1st**
2022	FIA Formula 3 Championship	Carlin	18	0	1	1	2	54	11th
2023	FIA Formula 3 Championship	Prema Racing	18	4	1	3	5	119	**2nd**
2023	Formula One	Williams Racing	Test driver						
2024	FIA Formula 2 Championship	ART Grand Prix	22	2	0	1	2	59	16th
2024–25	Formula E	Envision Racing	Simulator driver						
2025	Super Formula	Kondo Racing	12	0	0	0	0	7	15th
2025	Super GT – GT300	CarGuy MKS Racing	8	1	2	1	3	83.5	**3rd**
2025–26	Formula E	Envision Racing	Simulator driver						
2026	Super Formula	Wecars Impul with SDG	10	0	1	0	3	54	5th*
2026	Super GT – GT300	CarGuy MKS Racing	6	0	0	0	2	56	9th
2026–27	Formula E	PaySafe Envision Racing	0	0	0	0	0	0	TBD

* Season still in progress.

=== Complete Ginetta Junior Championship results ===
(key) (Races in bold indicate pole position) (Races in italics indicate fastest lap)

Year	Team	1	2	3	4	5	6	7	8	9	10	11	12	13	14	15	16	17	18	19	20	21	22	23	24	25	26	27	DC	Points
2019	Douglas Motorsport	BHI; 1; 2	**BHI**; **2**; 9	DON; 1; 2	DON; 2; 8	DON; 3; 2	THR1; 1; 2	THR1; 2; 2	CRO; 1 C	CRO; 2; 8	OUL; 1; 11	OUL; 2; 7																	2nd	591
2019	R Racing												SNE; 1; 4	SNE; 2; 4	**SNE**; **3**; 1	**SNE**; **4**; 1	THR2; 1; 2	THR2; 2; 1	**THR2**; **3**; 2	KNO; 1; 3	KNO; 2; 2	KNO; 3; 2	SIL; 1; 2	SIL; 2; 5	SIL; 3; 9	BHGP; 1; 5	BHGP; 2 Ret	BHGP; 3; 7	2nd	591

=== Complete F4 British Championship results ===
(key) (Races in bold indicate pole position) (Races in italics indicate fastest lap)

Year	Team	1	2	3	4	5	6	7	8	9	10	11	12	13	14	15	16	17	18	19	20	21	22	23	24	25	26	DC	Points
2020	Carlin	DON; 1; 4	DON; 2; 1	DON; 3; 3	**BHGP**; **1**; 1	BHGP; 2 Ret	**BHGP**; **3**; 1	OUL; 1; 2	OUL; 2; 9	OUL; 3; 3	KNO; 1; 4	KNO; 2; 1	KNO; 3; 3	THR; 1; 5	THR; 2; 10	THR; 3; 12	SIL; 1; 2	SIL; 2; 1	SIL; 3; 3	CRO; 1; 1	CRO; 2; 2	SNE; 1; 2	SNE; 2; 1	**SNE**; **3**; 1	BHI; 1; 2	BHI; 2; 4	BHI; 3; 1‡	2nd	408.5

‡ Half points were awarded for Race 3, as less than 75% of the scheduled distance was completed.

=== Complete GB3 Championship results ===
(key) (Races in bold indicate pole position) (Races in italics indicate fastest lap)

Year	Entrant	1	2	3	4	5	6	7	8	9	10	11	12	13	14	15	16	17	18	19	20	21	22	23	24	DC	Points
2021	Carlin	BRH; 1; 3	BRH; 2; 1	BRH; 3; 7^{10}	SIL1; 1; 2	SIL1; 2; 2	SIL1; 3; 9^{6}	**DON1**; **1**; 1	**DON1**; **2**; 1	DON1; 3 Ret	SPA; 1; 2	SPA; 2; 2	SPA; 3; 7^{8}	SNE; 1; 17	SNE; 2; 2	SNE; 3; 2^{3}	SIL2; 1; 15	SIL2; 2; 4	SIL2; 3; 1^{5}	**OUL**; **1**; 1	**OUL**; **2** Ret	OUL; 3; 6^{10}	**DON2**; **1**; 1	DON2; 2; 1	DON2; 3; 8^{13}	1st	535

=== Complete FIA Formula 3 Championship results ===
(key) (Races in bold indicate pole position; races in italics indicate points for the fastest lap of top ten finishers)

Year	Entrant	1	2	3	4	5	6	7	8	9	10	11	12	13	14	15	16	17	18	DC	Points
2022	Carlin	BHR; SPR; 6	BHR; FEA; 18	IMO; SPR; Ret	IMO; FEA; 6	CAT; SPR; 18	CAT; FEA; 27†	SIL; SPR; 14	**SIL**; **FEA**; 2	RBR; SPR; 12	RBR; FEA; 17	HUN; SPR; 18	HUN; FEA; 4	SPA; SPR; 20	SPA; FEA; 13	ZAN; SPR; 3	ZAN; FEA; 23	MNZ; SPR; Ret	MNZ; FEA; 11	11th	54
2023	Prema Racing	BHR; SPR; 12	BHR; FEA; 11	MEL; SPR; 1	MEL; FEA; 5	MON; SPR; 13	MON; FEA; 7	CAT; SPR; 1	CAT; FEA; 8	RBR; SPR; 4	RBR; FEA; 1	SIL; SPR; 16	SIL; FEA; 18	HUN; SPR; 22	**HUN**; **FEA**; 1	SPA; SPR; 15	SPA; FEA; 12	MNZ; SPR; 11	MNZ; FEA; 2	2nd	119

=== Complete Formula One participations ===
(key) (Races in bold indicate pole position) (Races in italics indicate fastest lap)

Year	Entrant	Chassis	Engine	1	2	3	4	5	6	7	8	9	10	11	12	13	14	15	16	17	18	19	20	21	22	WDC	Points
2023	Williams Racing	Williams FW45	Mercedes M14 E Performance V6 t	BHR	SAU	AUS	AZE	MIA	MON	ESP	CAN	AUT	GBR	HUN	BEL	NED	ITA	SIN	JPN	QAT	USA	MXC	SAP	LVG	ABU; TD	–	–

=== Complete FIA Formula 2 Championship results ===
(key) (Races in bold indicate pole position) (Races in italics indicate fastest lap)

Year	Entrant	1	2	3	4	5	6	7	8	9	10	11	12	13	14	15	16	17	18	19	20	21	22	23	24	25	26	27	28	DC	Points
2024	ART Grand Prix	BHR; SPR; 7	BHR; FEA; 4	JED; SPR; 16†	JED; FEA; Ret	MEL; SPR; 8	MEL; FEA; Ret	IMO; SPR; 9	IMO; FEA; 13	MON; SPR; 10	MON; FEA; 1	CAT; SPR; 9	CAT; FEA; 15	RBR; SPR; 9	RBR; FEA; 9	SIL; SPR; Ret	SIL; FEA; 11	HUN; SPR; 19	HUN; FEA; 14	SPA; SPR; 1	SPA; FEA; 4	MNZ; SPR; Ret	MNZ; FEA; 13	BAK; SPR	BAK; FEA	LSL; SPR	LSL; FEA	YMC; SPR	YMC; FEA	16th	59

=== Complete Super Formula results ===
Year	Team	Engine	1	2	3	4	5	6	7	8	9	10	11	12	DC	Points
2025	Kondo Racing	Toyota	SUZ; 8	SUZ; 22†	MOT; 12	MOT; 11	AUT; Ret	FUJ; 14	FUJ; 16	SUG; 7	FUJ; 11	SUZ; Ret	SUZ; 20	SUZ; 17	15th	7
2026	Wecars Impul with SDG	Toyota	MOT; Ret	MOT; 6	SUZ; 9	SUZ; 20	**FUJ**; 2^{1}	FUJ; 16	FUJ; 15	SUG; 9	FUJ; 3	FUJ; 2^{3}	SUZ	SUZ	5th*	54*

^{†} Did not finish the race, but was classified as he completed over 90% of the race distance.
^{*} Season still in progress.

=== Complete Super GT results ===
(key) (Races in bold indicate pole position) (Races in italics indicate fastest lap)

Year	Team	Car	Class	1	2	3	4	5	6	7	8	9	DC	Points
2025	CarGuy MKS Racing	Ferrari 296 GT3	GT300	OKA; 17	FUJ; 4	SEP	FS1 (4)	FS2; 17	SUZ; 1	**SUG**; 8	**AUT**; 2	MOT; 7	3rd	83.5
2026	CarGuy MKS Racing	Ferrari 296 GT3 Evo	GT300	OKA; 13	FUJ; 11	FUJ; 3	SUZ; 2	SUG; 13	AUT; 7	MOT	MOT		9th	56

^{(Number)} Driver did not take part in this sprint race, points are still awarded for the teammate's result.

Sporting positions
Preceded by Kaylen Frederick (BRDC British Formula 3 Championship)	GB3 Championship; Champion; 2021	Succeeded by Luke Browning
Awards
Preceded by Johnathan Hoggard (2019)	Aston Martin Autosport BRDC Award; 2021	Succeeded by Luke Browning
