= 2024 Spa-Francorchamps Formula 2 round =

Motor racing event

(Belgium) 2024 Spa-Francorchamps Formula 2 round
Round details
- Round 10 of 14 in the 2024 FIA Formula 2 Championship.
- Location: Circuit de Spa-Francorchamps, Stavelot, Belgium
- Course: Permanent racing facility 7.004 km (4.352 mi)

Sprint Race
- Date: 27 July 2024
- Laps: 5 (Note: The sprint race was red flagged for poor visibility due to weather after lap 5, less than 50% through the 18 scheduled laps. Reduced points were awarded.)
Podium
First	(United Kingdom) Zak O'Sullivan	ART Grand Prix
Second	(Norway) Dennis Hauger	MP Motorsport
Third	(Netherlands) Richard Verschoor	Trident
Fastest lap
Driver	(United Kingdom) Zak O'Sullivan	ART Grand Prix
- Time: 2:19.889 (on lap 2)

Feature Race
- Date: 28 July 2024
- Laps: 25
Pole position
Driver	(Estonia) Paul Aron	Hitech Pulse-Eight
Time	1:56.959	
Podium
First	(France) Isack Hadjar	Campos Racing
Second	(Brazil) Gabriel Bortoleto	Invicta Racing
Third	(United States) Jak Crawford	DAMS Lucas Oil
Fastest lap
Driver	(Estonia) Paul Aron	Hitech Pulse-Eight
- Time: 1:59.029 (on lap 11)

The 2024 Spa-Francorchamps Formula 2 round was a motor racing event held between 26 and 28 July 2024 at the Circuit de Spa-Francorchamps, Stavelot, Belgium. It was the tenth round of the 2024 Formula 2 Championship and was held in support of the 2024 Belgian Grand Prix.

== Classification ==
=== Qualifying ===
Pos.	No.	Driver	Team	Time/Gap	Grid SR	Grid FR
1	17	(Estonia) Paul Aron	Hitech Pulse-Eight	1:56.959	20^{1}	1
2	10	(Brazil) Gabriel Bortoleto	Invicta Racing	+0.168	9	2
3	20	(France) Isack Hadjar	Campos Racing	+0.282	8	3
4	7	(United States) Jak Crawford	DAMS Lucas Oil	+0.423	7	4
5	4	(Italy) Andrea Kimi Antonelli	Prema Racing	+0.438	6	5
6	5	(Barbados) Zane Maloney	Rodin Motorsport	+0.547	5	6
7	12	(Argentina) Franco Colapinto	MP Motorsport	+0.724	4	7
8	22	(Netherlands) Richard Verschoor	Trident	+0.789	3	8
9	11	(Norway) Dennis Hauger	MP Motorsport	+0.815	2	9
10	2	(United Kingdom) Zak O'Sullivan	ART Grand Prix	+0.823	1	10
11	16	(Belgium) Amaury Cordeel	Hitech Pulse-Eight	+0.823	10	11
12	9	(India) Kush Maini	Invicta Racing	+0.845	11	12
13	14	(Brazil) Enzo Fittipaldi	Van Amersfoort Racing	+0.862	12	13
14	8	(United States) Juan Manuel Correa	DAMS Lucas Oil	+0.954	13	14
15	3	(United Kingdom) Oliver Bearman	Prema Racing	+1.020	14	15
16	6	(Japan) Ritomo Miyata	Rodin Motorsport	+1.104	15	16
17	21	(Spain) Pepe Martí	Campos Racing	+1.161	16	17
18	15	(Mexico) Rafael Villagómez	Van Amersfoort Racing	+1.230	17	18
19	25	(United Kingdom) Taylor Barnard	AIX Racing	+1.829	18	19
20	24	(Paraguay) Joshua Dürksen	AIX Racing	+2.113	19	20
21	23	(Czech Republic) Roman Staněk	Trident	+2.500	21	21
107% time: 2:05.146 (+8.187)
—	1	(France) Victor Martins	ART Grand Prix	No Time	22^{2}	22^{2}

Notes:

- ^1 – Paul Aron was handed two separate five-place grid penalties for the sprint race for forcing another driver off the track and for causing a collision at the previous round.
- ^2 – Victor Martins could not set a meaningful laptime due to a mechanical failure. The stewards permitted him to start both races from the last position on the grid.

=== Sprint Race ===
The Sprint race was set to be held on 27 July 2024, at 14:15 local time (UTC+2), however, due to heavy rain, it was postponed to 18:15 local time on the same day. The race saw only 5 laps of action after a Safety Car was deployed as Pepe Martí's Campos Racing car stopped on the track on lap 3 due to a mechanical failure.

The race was red flagged and was not resumed after 2 laps under the Safety Car owing to the poor visibility due to the heavy rain. Because less than 50% of the racing distance was completed, reduced points were awarded, with the top 5 classified drivers receiving 5 points down to 1, with no fastest lap point awarded.

Pos.	No.	Driver	Team	Laps	Time/Gap	Grid	Pts.
1	2	(United Kingdom) Zak O'Sullivan	ART Grand Prix	5	14:15.548	1	5
2	11	(Norway) Dennis Hauger	MP Motorsport	5	+0.849	2	4
3	22	(Netherlands) Richard Verschoor	Trident	5	+1.122	3	3
4	5	(Barbados) Zane Maloney	Rodin Motorsport	5	+3.031	5	2
5	7	(United States) Jak Crawford	DAMS Lucas Oil	5	+4.051	7	1
6	4	(Italy) Andrea Kimi Antonelli	Prema Racing	5	+5.210	6	
7	3	(United Kingdom) Oliver Bearman	Prema Racing	5	+6.022	14	
8	12	(Argentina) Franco Colapinto	MP Motorsport	5	+7.665	4	
9	20	(France) Isack Hadjar	Campos Racing	5	+8.907	8	
10	10	(Brazil) Gabriel Bortoleto	Invicta Racing	5	+9.907	9	
11	16	(Belgium) Amaury Cordeel	Hitech Pulse-Eight	5	+11.187	10	
12	1	(France) Victor Martins	ART Grand Prix	5	+12.642	22	
13	9	(India) Kush Maini	Virtuosi Racing	5	+14.099	11	
14	14	(Brazil) Enzo Fittipaldi	Van Amersfoort Racing	5	+15.699	12	
15	6	(Japan) Ritomo Miyata	Rodin Motorsport	5	+16.697	15	
16	25	(United Kingdom) Taylor Barnard	AIX Racing	5	+17.085	18	
17	8	(United States) Juan Manuel Correa	DAMS Lucas Oil	5	+17.851	13	
18	17	(Estonia) Paul Aron	Campos Racing	5	+18.702	20	
19	24	(Paraguay) Joshua Dürksen	AIX Racing	5	+19.254	19	
20	23	(Czech Republic) Roman Staněk	Trident	5	+20.186	21	
21	15	(Mexico) Rafael Villagómez	Van Amersfoort Racing	5	+21.200	17	
DNF	21	(Spain) Pepe Martí	Campos Racing	1	Engine	16	
Fastest lap set by: (United Kingdom) Zak O'Sullivan – 2:19.889 (Lap 2)

=== Feature Race ===
Pos.	No.	Driver	Team	Laps	Time/Gap	Grid	Pts.
1	20	(France) Isack Hadjar	Campos Racing	25	57:08.495	3	25
2	10	(Brazil) Gabriel Bortoleto	Invicta Racing	25	+2.934	2	18 (1)
3	7	(United States) Jak Crawford	DAMS Lucas Oil	25	+12.093	4	15
4	2	(United Kingdom) Zak O'Sullivan	ART Grand Prix	25	+13.741	10	12
5	22	(Netherlands) Richard Verschoor	Trident	25	+19.392	8	10
6	5	(Barbados) Zane Maloney	Rodin Motorsport	25	+21.282	6	8
7	6	(Japan) Ritomo Miyata	Rodin Motorsport	25	+21.884	16	6
8	16	(Belgium) Amaury Cordeel	Hitech Pulse-Eight	25	+25.388	11	4
9	4	(Italy) Andrea Kimi Antonelli	Prema Racing	25	+31.800	5	2
10	24	(Paraguay) Joshua Dürksen	AIX Racing	25	+32.446	20	1
11	8	(United States) Juan Manuel Correa	DAMS Lucas Oil	25	+39.528	14	
12	11	(Norway) Dennis Hauger	MP Motorsport	25	+42.048	9	
13	25	(United Kingdom) Taylor Barnard	AIX Racing	25	+43.750	19	
14	23	(Czech Republic) Roman Staněk	Trident	25	+53.654^{3}	21	
15	9	(India) Kush Maini	Invicta Racing	25	+58.831^{3}	12	
16	17	(Estonia) Paul Aron	Hitech Pulse-Eight	24	Engine	1	(2)
DNF	14	(Brazil) Enzo Fittipaldi	Van Amersfoort Racing	10	Stalled during pit stop	13	
DNF	15	(Mexico) Rafael Villagómez	Van Amersfoort Racing	3	Collision	18	
DNF	1	(France) Victor Martins	ART Grand Prix	3	Collision	22	
DNF	12	(Argentina) Franco Colapinto	MP Motorsport	0	Engine	7	
DNF	3	(United Kingdom) Oliver Bearman	Prema Racing	0	Collision	15	
DNF	21	(Spain) Pepe Martí	Campos Racing	0	Collision	17	
Fastest lap set by: (Estonia) Paul Aron – 1:59.029 (lap 11)

Notes:

- ^3 - Kush Maini and Roman Staněk each received a 5-second time penalty for repeated track-limit violations.
- ^4 - Paul Aron did not finish the race, as his engine failed on the last lap. Because he had completed more than 90% of the race distance, he was classified 16th.

== Standings after the event ==
Drivers' Championship standings

	Pos.	Driver	Points
	1	(France) Isack Hadjar	165
1	2	(Brazil) Gabriel Bortoleto	129
1	3	(Estonia) Paul Aron	124
	4	(Barbados) Zane Maloney	111
2	5	(United States) Jak Crawford	100

Teams' Championship standings

	Pos.	Team	Points
1	1	(Spain) Campos Racing	203
1	2	(United Kingdom) Invicta Racing	203
	3	(Netherlands) MP Motorsport	179
	4	(United Kingdom) Hitech Pulse-Eight	153
	5	(New Zealand) Rodin Motorsport	140

- Note: Only the top five positions are included for both sets of standings

== See also ==
- 2024 Belgian Grand Prix
- 2024 Spa-Francorchamps Formula 3 round

== Notes ==
Previous round: 2024 Budapest Formula 2 round	FIA Formula 2 Championship; 2024 season	Next round: 2024 Monza Formula 2 round
Previous round: 2023 Spa-Francorchamps Formula 2 round	Spa-Francorchamps Formula 2 round	Next round: 2025 Spa-Francorchamps Formula 2 round
