= 2024 Barcelona Formula 2 round =

Motor racing event

(Spain) 2024 Barcelona Formula 2 round
Round details
- Round 6 of 14 in the 2024 FIA Formula 2 Championship.
- Location: Circuit de Barcelona-Catalunya, Montmeló, Catalonia, Spain
- Course: Permanent racing facility 4.657 km (2.894 mi)

Sprint Race
- Date: 22 June 2024
- Laps: 26
Podium
First	(France) Victor Martins	ART Grand Prix
Second	(India) Kush Maini	Invicta Racing
Third	(Estonia) Paul Aron	Hitech Pulse-Eight
Fastest lap
Driver	(Japan) Ritomo Miyata	Rodin Motorsport
- Time: 1:30.617 (on lap 3)

Feature Race
- Date: 23 June 2024
- Laps: 37
Pole position
Driver	(Estonia) Paul Aron	Hitech Pulse-Eight
Time	1:24.766	
Podium
First	(United States) Jak Crawford	DAMS Lucas Oil
Second	(Argentina) Franco Colapinto	MP Motorsport
Third	(United States) Juan Manuel Correa	DAMS Lucas Oil
Fastest lap
Driver	(Italy) Andrea Kimi Antonelli	Prema Racing
- Time: 1:27.918 (on lap 31)

The 2024 Barcelona Formula 2 round was a motor racing event held between 21 and 23 June 2024 at the Circuit de Barcelona-Catalunya. It was the sixth round of the 2024 Formula 2 Championship and was held in support of the 2024 Spanish Grand Prix.

== Classification ==
=== Qualifying ===
Qualifying was held on 21 June 2024, at 15:55 local time (UTC+2).

Pos.	No.	Driver	Entrant	Time	Grid SR	Grid FR
1	17	(Estonia) Paul Aron	Hitech Pulse-Eight	1:24.766	9	1
2	7	(United States) Jak Crawford	DAMS Lucas Oil	+0.002	8	2
3	12	(Argentina) Franco Colapinto	MP Motorsport	+0.006	7	3
4	10	(Brazil) Gabriel Bortoleto	Invicta Racing	+0.055	6	4
5	4	(Italy) Andrea Kimi Antonelli	Prema Racing	+0.105	5	5
6	6	(Japan) Ritomo Miyata	Rodin Motorsport	+0.182	4	6
7	24	(Paraguay) Joshua Dürksen	AIX Racing	+0.222	14^{1}	7
8	8	(United States) Juan Manuel Correa	DAMS Lucas Oil	+0.246	3	8
9	1	(France) Victor Martins	ART Grand Prix	+0.405	2	9
10	9	(India) Kush Maini	Invicta Racing	+0.433	1	10
11	20	(France) Isack Hadjar	Campos Racing	+0.439	10	11
12	2	(United Kingdom) Zak O'Sullivan	ART Grand Prix	+0.459	11	12
13	11	(Norway) Dennis Hauger	MP Motorsport	+0.483	12	13
14	21	(Spain) Pepe Martí	Campos Racing	+0.519	13	14
15	3	(United Kingdom) Oliver Bearman	Prema Racing	+0.555	15	15
16	14	(Brazil) Enzo Fittipaldi	Van Amersfoort Racing	+0.576	16	16
17	5	(Barbados) Zane Maloney	Rodin Motorsport	+0.578	17	17
18	16	(Belgium) Amaury Cordeel	Hitech Pulse-Eight	+0.646	18	18
19	22	(Netherlands) Richard Verschoor	Trident	+0.804	19	19
20	15	(Mexico) Rafael Villagómez	Van Amersfoort Racing	+1.019	20	20
21	23	(Czech Republic) Roman Staněk	Trident	+1.449	21	21
107% time: 1:30.699 (+5.933)
—	25	(United Kingdom) Taylor Barnard	AIX Racing	+18.701	22^{2}	22^{2}

Notes:

- ^1 – Joshua Dürksen received a ten-place grid penalty for causing a collision with Zane Maloney at the Feature Race in Monte Carlo. He will serve the penalty in the next race he competes.
- ^2 – Taylor Barnard failed to set a time within the 107%-rule as he crashed out during qualifying, but was later given permission by the stewards to start both races from the back of the grid.

=== Sprint Race ===
The Sprint race was held on 22 June 2024, at 14:15 local time (UTC+2).

Pos.	No.	Driver	Entrant	Laps	Time/Retired	Grid	Points
1	1	(France) Victor Martins	ART Grand Prix	26	39:47.280	2	10
2	9	(India) Kush Maini	Invicta Racing	26	+4.411	1	8
3	17	(Estonia) Paul Aron	Hitech Pulse-Eight	26	+8.625	9	6
4	7	(United States) Jak Crawford	DAMS Lucas Oil	26	+9.096	8	5
5	10	(Brazil) Gabriel Bortoleto	Invicta Racing	26	+10.742	6	4
6	20	(France) Isack Hadjar	Campos Racing	26	+11.612	10	3
7	6	(Japan) Ritomo Miyata	Rodin Motorsport	26	+12.641	4	2 (1)
8	8	(United States) Juan Manuel Correa	DAMS Lucas Oil	26	+12.968^{1}	3	1
9	2	(United Kingdom) Zak O'Sullivan	ART Grand Prix	26	+25.925	11	
10	24	(Paraguay) Joshua Dürksen	AIX Racing	26	+26.814	14	
11	21	(Spain) Pepe Martí	Campos Racing	26	+27.433	13	
12	11	(Norway) Dennis Hauger	MP Motorsport	26	+27.834^{2}	12	
13	22	(Netherlands) Richard Verschoor	Trident	26	+29.362	19	
14	16	(Belgium) Amaury Cordeel	Hitech Pulse-Eight	26	+29.819	18	
15	4	(Italy) Andrea Kimi Antonelli	Prema Racing	26	+29.995^{1}	5	
16	14	(Brazil) Enzo Fittipaldi	Van Amersfoort Racing	26	+31.765	16	
17	15	(Mexico) Rafael Villagómez	Van Amersfoort Racing	26	+33.049^{1}	20	
18	12	(Argentina) Franco Colapinto	MP Motorsport	26	+35.554^{2}	7	
19	25	(United Kingdom) Taylor Barnard	AIX Racing	26	+38.349	22	
20	5	(Barbados) Zane Maloney	Rodin Motorsport	26	+41.445^{1}	17	
21	3	(United Kingdom) Oliver Bearman	Prema Racing	26	+41.456	15	
22	23	(Czech Republic) Roman Staněk	Trident	26	+41.518	21	
Fastest lap set by (Japan) Ritomo Miyata: 1:30.617 (lap 6)

Notes:

- ^1 – Juan Manuel Correa, Andrea Kimi Antonelli, Rafael Villagómez and Zane Maloney all received five-second time-penalties post-race for several track limits violations.
- ^2 – Dennis Hauger and Franco Colapinto both received ten-second time penalties for violating track limits more than five times each.

=== Feature Race ===
The Feature race was held on 23 June 2024, at 11:35 local time (UTC+2).

Pos.	No.	Driver	Entrant	Laps	Time/Retired	Grid	Points
1	7	(United States) Jak Crawford	DAMS Lucas Oil	37	59:46.800	2	25
2	12	(Argentina) Franco Colapinto	MP Motorsport	37	+1.400	3	18
3	8	(United States) Juan Manuel Correa	DAMS Lucas Oil	37	+5.820	8	15
4	17	(Estonia) Paul Aron	Hitech Pulse-Eight	37	+11.486	1	12 (2)
5	20	(France) Isack Hadjar	Campos Racing	37	+14.720	11	10
6	9	(India) Kush Maini	Invicta Racing	37	+19.333	10	8
7	5	(Barbados) Zane Maloney	Rodin Motorsport	37	+22.692	17	6
8	16	(Belgium) Amaury Cordeel	Hitech Pulse-Eight	37	+24.442	18	4
9	21	(Spain) Pepe Martí	Campos Racing	37	+24.919	14	2 (1)
10	10	(Brazil) Gabriel Bortoleto	Invicta Racing	37	+25.400^{1}	4	1
11	14	(Brazil) Enzo Fittipaldi	Van Amersfoort Racing	37	+29.155	16	
12	4	(Italy) Andrea Kimi Antonelli	Prema Racing	37	+35.513	5	
13	6	(Japan) Ritomo Miyata	Rodin Motorsport	37	+35.955	6	
14	3	(United Kingdom) Oliver Bearman	Prema Racing	37	+37.470	15	
15	2	(United Kingdom) Zak O'Sullivan	ART Grand Prix	37	+45.073	12	
16	15	(Mexico) Rafael Villagómez	Van Amersfoort Racing	37	+47.273	20	
17	23	(Czech Republic) Roman Staněk	Trident	37	+1:03.092	21	
18†	22	(Netherlands) Richard Verschoor	Trident	35	+2 laps^{1}	19	
DNF	24	(Paraguay) Joshua Dürksen	AIX Racing	16	Engine	7	
DNF	25	(United Kingdom) Taylor Barnard	AIX Racing	11	Engine	22	
DNF	1	(France) Victor Martins	ART Grand Prix	0	Collision	9	
DNF	11	(Norway) Dennis Hauger	MP Motorsport	0	Collision	13	
Fastest lap set by (Italy) Andrea Kimi Antonelli: 1:27.918 (lap 31)

Notes:

- ^1 – Gabriel Bortoleto originally finished seventh, but was later given a five-second time penalty for causing a collision with Kush Maini, dropping him down to tenth in the final classification.
- ^2 – Richard Verschoor retired from the race, but was classified as he completed over 90% of the race distance.

== Standings after the event ==
Drivers' Championship standings

	Pos.	Driver	Points
	1	(Estonia) Paul Aron	100
	2	(France) Isack Hadjar	91
	3	(Barbados) Zane Maloney	75
7	4	(United States) Jak Crawford	62
1	5	(Norway) Dennis Hauger	56

Teams' Championship standings

	Pos.	Team	Points
	1	(Spain) Campos Racing	120
	2	(United Kingdom) Hitech Pulse-Eight	119
	3	(Netherlands) MP Motorsport	112
1	4	(United Kingdom) Invicta Racing	105
1	5	(New Zealand) Rodin Motorsport	94

- Note: Only the top five positions are included for both sets of standings.

== See also ==
- 2024 Spanish Grand Prix
- 2024 Barcelona Formula 3 round

== Notes ==
Previous round: 2024 Monte Carlo Formula 2 round	FIA Formula 2 Championship; 2024 season	Next round: 2024 Spielberg Formula 2 round
Previous round: 2023 Barcelona Formula 2 round	Barcelona Formula 2 round	Next round: 2025 Barcelona Formula 2 round
