= 2024 Budapest Formula 2 round =

Motor racing event

(Hungary) 2024 Budapest Formula 2 round
Round details
- Round 9 of 14 in the 2024 FIA Formula 2 Championship.
- Location: Hungaroring; Mogyoród, Hungary
- Course: Permanent racing facility 4.381 km (2.722 mi)

Sprint Race
- Date: 20 July 2024
- Laps: 28
Podium
| First | (India) Kush Maini | Invicta Racing |
| Second | (France) Victor Martins | ART Grand Prix |
| Third | (France) Isack Hadjar | Campos Racing |
Fastest lap
| Driver | (Brazil) Gabriel Bortoleto | Invicta Racing |
- Time: 1:32.266 (on lap 24)

Feature Race
- Date: 21 July 2024
- Laps: 36 (Note: The race was scheduled to be run for 37 laps, but was shortened to 36 laps due to the maximum race time being reached after multiple Safety Car periods.)
Pole position
| Driver | (Estonia) Paul Aron | Hitech Pulse-Eight |
| Time | 1:30.028 | |
Podium
| First | (Italy) Andrea Kimi Antonelli | Prema Racing |
| Second | (France) Victor Martins | ART Grand Prix |
| Third | (Netherlands) Richard Verschoor | Trident |
Fastest lap
| Driver | (Italy) Andrea Kimi Antonelli | Prema Racing |
- Time: 1:32.086 (on lap 29)

The 2024 Budapest Formula 2 round was a motor racing event held between 19 and 21 July 2024 at the Hungaroring, Mogyoród, Hungary. It was the ninth round of the 2024 Formula 2 Championship and was held in support of the 2024 Hungarian Grand Prix.

== Classification ==
=== Qualifying ===
Qualifying was held on 19 July 2024, at 16:00 local time (UTC+2).

| Pos. | No. | Driver | Entrant | Time | Grid SR | Grid FR |
|---|---|---|---|---|---|---|
| 1 | 17 | (Estonia) Paul Aron | Hitech Pulse-Eight | 1:30.028 | 10 | 1 |
| 2 | 14 | (Brazil) Enzo Fittipaldi | Van Amersfoort Racing | +0.068 | 9 | 2 |
| 3 | 20 | (France) Isack Hadjar | Campos Racing | +0.193 | 8 | 3 |
| 4 | 10 | (Brazil) Gabriel Bortoleto | Invicta Racing | +0.209 | 7 | 4 |
| 5 | 1 | (France) Victor Martins | ART Grand Prix | +0.219 | 6 | 5 |
| 6 | 11 | (Norway) Dennis Hauger | MP Motorsport | +0.292 | 5 | 6 |
| 7 | 4 | (Italy) Andrea Kimi Antonelli | Prema Racing | +0.325 | 4 | 7 |
| 8 | 5 | (Barbados) Zane Maloney | Rodin Motorsport | +0.434 | 3 | 8 |
| 9 | 9 | (India) Kush Maini | Invicta Racing | +0.464 | 2 | 9 |
| 10 | 22 | (Netherlands) Richard Verschoor | Trident | +0.578 | 1 | 10 |
| 11 | 24 | (Paraguay) Joshua Dürksen | AIX Racing | +0.592 | 11 | 11 |
| 12 | 12 | (Argentina) Franco Colapinto | MP Motorsport | +0.628 | 12 | 12 |
| 13 | 16 | (Belgium) Amaury Cordeel | Hitech Pulse-Eight | +0.669 | 13 | 13 |
| 14 | 3 | (United Kingdom) Oliver Bearman | Prema Racing | +0.716 | 14 | 14 |
| 15 | 2 | (United Kingdom) Zak O'Sullivan | ART Grand Prix | +0.792 | 15 | 15 |
| 16 | 15 | (Mexico) Rafael Villagómez | Van Amersfoort Racing | +0.858 | 16 | 16 |
| 17 | 25 | (United Kingdom) Taylor Barnard | AIX Racing | +0.885 | 17 | 17 |
| 18 | 6 | (Japan) Ritomo Miyata | Rodin Motorsport | +0.951 | 18 | 18 |
| 19 | 8 | (United States) Juan Manuel Correa | DAMS Lucas Oil | +0.985 | 19 | 19 |
| 20 | 23 | (Czech Republic) Roman Staněk | Trident | +1.212 | 20 | 20 |
| 21 | 21 | (Spain) Pepe Martí | Campos Racing | +1.511 | 21 | 21 |
| 22 | 7 | (United States) Jak Crawford | DAMS Lucas Oil | +1.763 | 22 | 22 |

=== Sprint Race ===
The Sprint race was held on 20 July 2024, at 14:15 local time (UTC+2).

| Pos. | No. | Driver | Entrant | Laps | Time/Retired | Grid | Points |
|---|---|---|---|---|---|---|---|
| 1 | 9 | (India) Kush Maini | Invicta Racing | 28 | 44:28.935 | 2 | 10 |
| 2 | 1 | (France) Victor Martins | ART Grand Prix | 28 | +9.564 | 6 | 8 |
| 3 | 20 | (France) Isack Hadjar | Campos Racing | 28 | +15.005 | 8 | 6 (1) |
| 4 | 11 | (Norway) Dennis Hauger | MP Motorsport | 28 | +16.580 | 5 | 5 |
| 5 | 12 | (Argentina) Franco Colapinto | MP Motorsport | 28 | +24.643 | 12 | 4 |
| 6 | 17 | (Estonia) Paul Aron | Hitech Pulse-Eight | 28 | +26.161 | 10 | 3 |
| 7 | 25 | (United Kingdom) Taylor Barnard | AIX Racing | 28 | +32.825 | 17 | 2 |
| 8 | 8 | (United States) Juan Manuel Correa | DAMS Lucas Oil | 28 | +37.451 | 19 | 1 |
| 9 | 7 | (United States) Jak Crawford | DAMS Lucas Oil | 28 | +40.904 | 22 | |
| 10 | 3 | (United Kingdom) Oliver Bearman | Prema Racing | 28 | +49.354 | 14 | |
| 11 | 15 | (Mexico) Rafael Villagómez | Van Amersfoort Racing | 28 | +52.613 | 16 | |
| 12 | 6 | (Japan) Ritomo Miyata | Rodin Motorsport | 28 | +54.021 | 18 | |
| 13 | 5 | (Barbados) Zane Maloney | Rodin Motorsport | 28 | +54.913 | PL^{1} | |
| 14 | 4 | (Italy) Andrea Kimi Antonelli | Prema Racing | 28 | +55.108 | 4 | |
| 15 | 23 | (Czech Republic) Roman Staněk | Trident | 28 | +55.302 | 20 | |
| 16 | 10 | (Brazil) Gabriel Bortoleto | Invicta Racing | 28 | +56.073 | 7 | |
| 17 | 21 | (Spain) Pepe Martí | Campos Racing | 28 | +57.437 | 21 | |
| 18 | 24 | (Paraguay) Joshua Dürksen | AIX Racing | 28 | +59.822 | 11 | |
| 19 | 2 | (United Kingdom) Zak O'Sullivan | ART Grand Prix | 28 | +1:04.702 | 15 | |
| 20 | 16 | (Belgium) Amaury Cordeel | Hitech Pulse-Eight | 28 | +1:05.863^{2} | 13 | |
| 21 | 14 | (Brazil) Enzo Fittipaldi | Van Amersfoort Racing | 27 | +1 lap | 9 | |
| DSQ | 22 | (Netherlands) Richard Verschoor | Trident | 28 | Disqualified^{3} | 1 | |
Fastest lap set by (Brazil) Gabriel Bortoleto: 1:32.266 (lap 24)

Notes:

- ^1 – Zane Maloney was supposed to start from third position, but stalled on the grid on the formation lap. He then was required to start from the pit lane, with his grid slot being left vacant in the process.
- ^2 – Amaury Cordeel was given a 10 second time penalty for leaving the track and gaining an advantage.
- ^3 – Richard Verschoor finished first on the road, but was later disqualified as the plank on the floor of his car was thinner than permitted by the regulations. Kush Maini inherited the win, and Isack Hadjar inherited the fast lap point originally awarded to Verschoor.

=== Feature Race ===
The Feature race was held on 21 July 2024, at 10:05 local time (UTC+2).

| Pos. | No. | Driver | Entrant | Laps | Time/Retired | Grid | Points |
|---|---|---|---|---|---|---|---|
| 1 | 4 | (Italy) Andrea Kimi Antonelli | Prema Racing | 36 | 1:02:46.691 | 7 | 25 (1) |
| 2 | 1 | (France) Victor Martins | ART Grand Prix | 36 | +12.528 | 5 | 18 |
| 3 | 22 | (Netherlands) Richard Verschoor | Trident | 36 | +13.355 | 10 | 15 |
| 4 | 10 | (Brazil) Gabriel Bortoleto | Invicta Racing | 36 | +14.819 | 4 | 12 |
| 5 | 14 | (Brazil) Enzo Fittipaldi | Van Amersfoort Racing | 36 | +18.516 | 2 | 10 |
| 6 | 11 | (Norway) Dennis Hauger | MP Motorsport | 36 | +19.179 | 6 | 8 |
| 7 | 9 | (India) Kush Maini | Invicta Racing | 36 | +20.270 | 9 | 6 |
| 8 | 6 | (Japan) Ritomo Miyata | Rodin Motorsport | 36 | +20.498 | 18 | 4 |
| 9 | 25 | (United Kingdom) Taylor Barnard | AIX Racing | 36 | +21.193 | 17 | 2 |
| 10 | 15 | (Mexico) Rafael Villagómez | Van Amersfoort Racing | 36 | +23.310 | 16 | 1 |
| 11 | 23 | (Czech Republic) Roman Staněk | Trident | 36 | +24.882 | 20 | |
| 12 | 21 | (Spain) Pepe Martí | Campos Racing | 36 | +26.705 | 21 | |
| 13 | 12 | (Argentina) Franco Colapinto | MP Motorsport | 36 | +28.408 | 12 | |
| 14 | 2 | (United Kingdom) Zak O'Sullivan | ART Grand Prix | 36 | +31.105 | 15 | |
| 15 | 3 | (United Kingdom) Oliver Bearman | Prema Racing | 36 | +31.507 | 14 | |
| 16 | 8 | (United States) Juan Manuel Correa | DAMS Lucas Oil | 36 | +31.883 | 19 | |
| 17 | 7 | (United States) Jak Crawford | DAMS Lucas Oil | 36 | +32.868 | 22 | |
| 18 | 20 | (France) Isack Hadjar | Campos Racing | 36 | +33.754 | PL^{1} | |
| 19 | 24 | (Paraguay) Joshua Dürksen | AIX Racing | 36 | +44.655 | 11 | |
| DNF | 16 | (Belgium) Amaury Cordeel | Hitech Pulse-Eight | 22 | Crash | 13 | |
| DNF | 5 | (Barbados) Zane Maloney | Rodin Motorsport | 7 | Collision | 8 | |
| DNF | 17 | (Estonia) Paul Aron | Hitech Pulse-Eight | 7 | Collision | 1 | (2) |
Fastest lap set by (Italy) Andrea Kimi Antonelli: 1:32.086 (lap 18)

Notes:

- ^1 – Isack Hadjar was supposed to start from third position, but was required to start from the pit lane as he failed to exit the pit lane on time. His grid slot was then left vacant.

== Standings after the event ==
Drivers' Championship standings

| | Pos. | Driver | Points |
|---|---|---|---|
| | 1 | (France) Isack Hadjar | 140 |
| | 2 | (Estonia) Paul Aron | 122 |
| 1 | 3 | (Brazil) Gabriel Bortoleto | 110 |
| 1 | 4 | (Barbados) Zane Maloney | 101 |
| | 5 | (Argentina) Franco Colapinto | 96 |

Teams' Championship standings

| | Pos. | Team | Points |
|---|---|---|---|
| 2 | 1 | (United Kingdom) Invicta Racing | 184 |
| 1 | 2 | (Spain) Campos Racing | 178 |
| 1 | 3 | (Netherlands) MP Motorsport | 175 |
| | 4 | (United Kingdom) Hitech Pulse-Eight | 147 |
| | 5 | (New Zealand) Rodin Motorsport | 124 |

- Note: Only the top five positions are included for both sets of standings.

== See also ==
- 2024 Hungarian Grand Prix
- 2024 Budapest Formula 3 round

== Notes ==
| Previous round: 2024 Silverstone Formula 2 round | FIA Formula 2 Championship; 2024 season | Next round: 2024 Spa-Francorchamps Formula 2 round |
| Previous round: 2023 Budapest Formula 2 round | Budapest Formula 2 round | Next round: 2025 Budapest Formula 2 round |
