= Joshua Dürksen =

Paraguayan racing driver (born 2003)

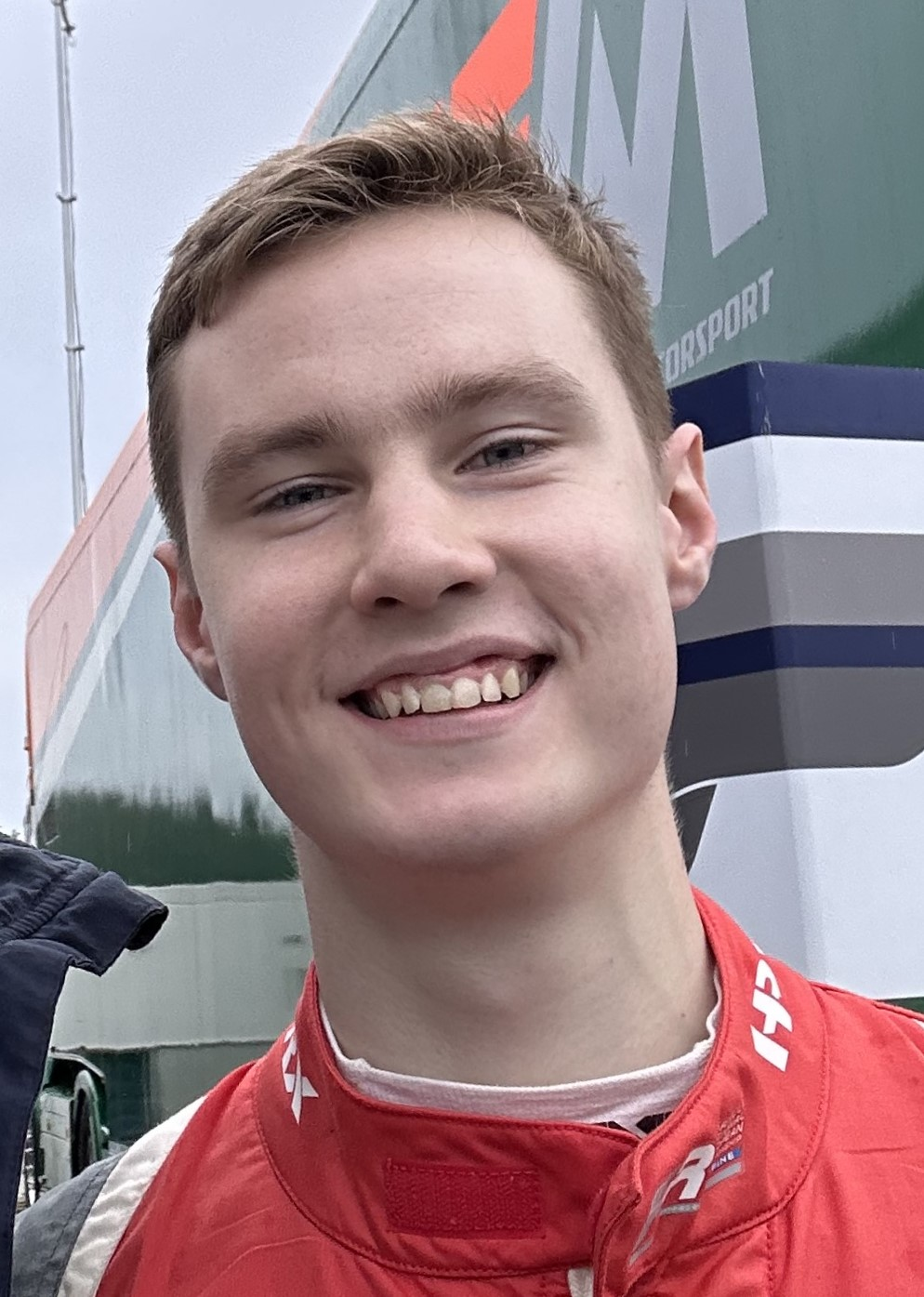
- Dürksen in 2023
- Nationality: (Paraguay) Paraguayan (Germany) German (Note: Dürksen, a dual citizen, has represented Paraguay for most of his racing career. In 2020, he competed under a German licence.)
- Born: Joshua Iván Dürksen Dyck; 27 October 2003 (age 23) Asunción, Paraguay

FIA Formula 2 Championship career
- Debut season: 2024
- Current team: Invicta Racing
- Categorisation: FIA Silver
- Car number: 2
- Former teams: AIX Racing
- Starts: 75
- Wins: 8
- Podiums: 16
- Poles: 0
- Fastest laps: 4
- Best finish: 9th in 2025

Previous series
- 2023; 2022–2023; 2021; 2019–2021; 2019–2020; 2019: FR Middle East; FR European; Euroformula Open; Italian F4; ADAC F4; F4 UAE
- Statistics up to date as of 25 August 2026.

Joshua Iván Dürksen Dyck (Note: Sometimes spelt Duerksen.) (German pronunciation: [ˈjoːzu̯a ˈdʏʁk.sn̩]; born 27 October 2003) is a Paraguayan racing driver competing in the FIA Formula 2 Championship for Invicta Racing, and serving as a development driver in Formula One for Mercedes. He previously competed for AIX Racing for two seasons, achieving four wins overall.

Dürksen previously raced for Arden in the Formula Regional European Championship in 2022 and 2023. He is a race-winner in FIA Formula 2 and Italian F4.

== Early life ==
Joshua Iván Dürksen Dyck was born in Asunción on 27 October 2003. He is of German descent, his great-grandfather being an immigrant who came to Paraguay escaping World War II. His parents are originally from Chaco. He has one brother.

== Career ==
=== Karting ===
Dürksen's karting career is relatively undisclosed, although it is known that he took part in his first international karting race in 2017 during the Rotax Max Challenge, where he became the first Paraguayan to reach the final.

=== Formula 4 ===
==== 2018 ====
Dürksen was selected as a finalist by the Winfield Racing School in a bid to compete in the 2018 French F4 Championship, but did not make it through.

==== 2019 ====
In 2019, Dürksen made his single-seater debut, racing for Mücke Motorsport in the Formula 4 UAE Championship alongside Nico Göhler. He scored his first single-seater victory during the first round of the championship at the Dubai Autodrome. He then took a double win during the next round in Yas Marina, being embroiled in a close fight with rival Matteo Nannini. Dürksen won once in the next Dubai round, but a winless round 4 that yielded only one podium allowed Nannini to pull away with the standings lead. Despite this, Dürksen won one more race during the final round, meaning that he finished 68 points behind his rival.

Dürksen then competed in both the Italian and ADAC Formula 4 championships, remaining with Mücke Motorsport in the former but switching to ADAC Berlin-Brandenburg for the latter campaign. He won a race in his debut round at Vallelunga in Italian F4, picking up the win after Roman Staněk and Gianluca Petecof were penalised ahead. He would finish third the next day, capping off a successful start to the season. Two more podiums followed in Austria and in Mugello, as he completed the season eighth in the standings. In ADAC F4, Dürksen started the campaign with a second-place rostrum at the Oschersleben; a further third place later in the season in Hockenheim lead to him finishing eleventh in the standings.

==== 2020 ====
The following year, Dürksen returned to the ADAC Formula 4 Championship with ADAC Berlin-Brandenburg on a full-time basis, whilst also racing in three rounds of Italian F4. After a podium in the opening Lausitzring round, Dürksen broke his duck the next round at the Nürburgring where he won the final race. This was followed with back-to-back victories as he was able to clinch the win from pole position in the first Hockenheimring race. Consistent points finishes, including three more podium finishes in the final four rounds lead Dürksen finishing sixth in the drivers' standings, with six podiums and 191 points.

In Italian F4, Dürksen won the very first race of his campaign at the Red Bull Ring, where after taking pole position, he sailed to a comfortable victory. A second place podium in the third race and four more points scoring finishes placed him 13th in the championship.

==== 2021 ====
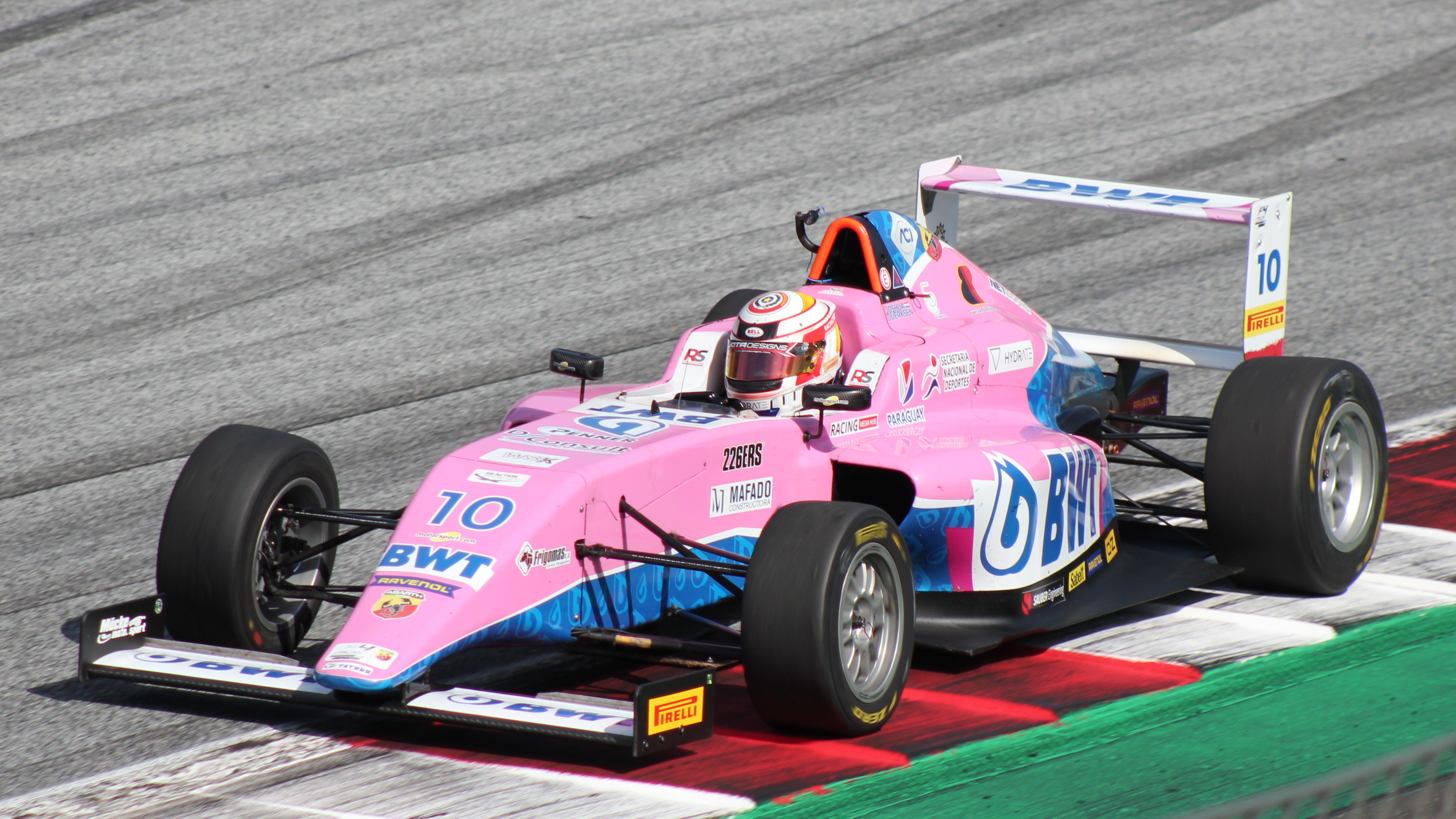
Dürksen racing in the 2021 Italian F4 Championship at the Red Bull Ring

Dürksen returned to the Italian F4 Championship in 2021 with BWT Mücke Motorsport for a third and final season. Dürksen failed to make the podium during the first half of the season, but rebounded during the penultimate round in Mugello where he secured a double victory. With an additional podium in the final round in Monza, He improved to sixth in the final standings and won two races at the Mugello round.

=== Euroformula Open ===
Dürksen also made a one-off appearance in the third-tier Euroformula Open Championship for Drivex School at the Hungaroring, accomplishing a podium on debut.

=== Formula Regional European Championship ===
==== 2022 ====
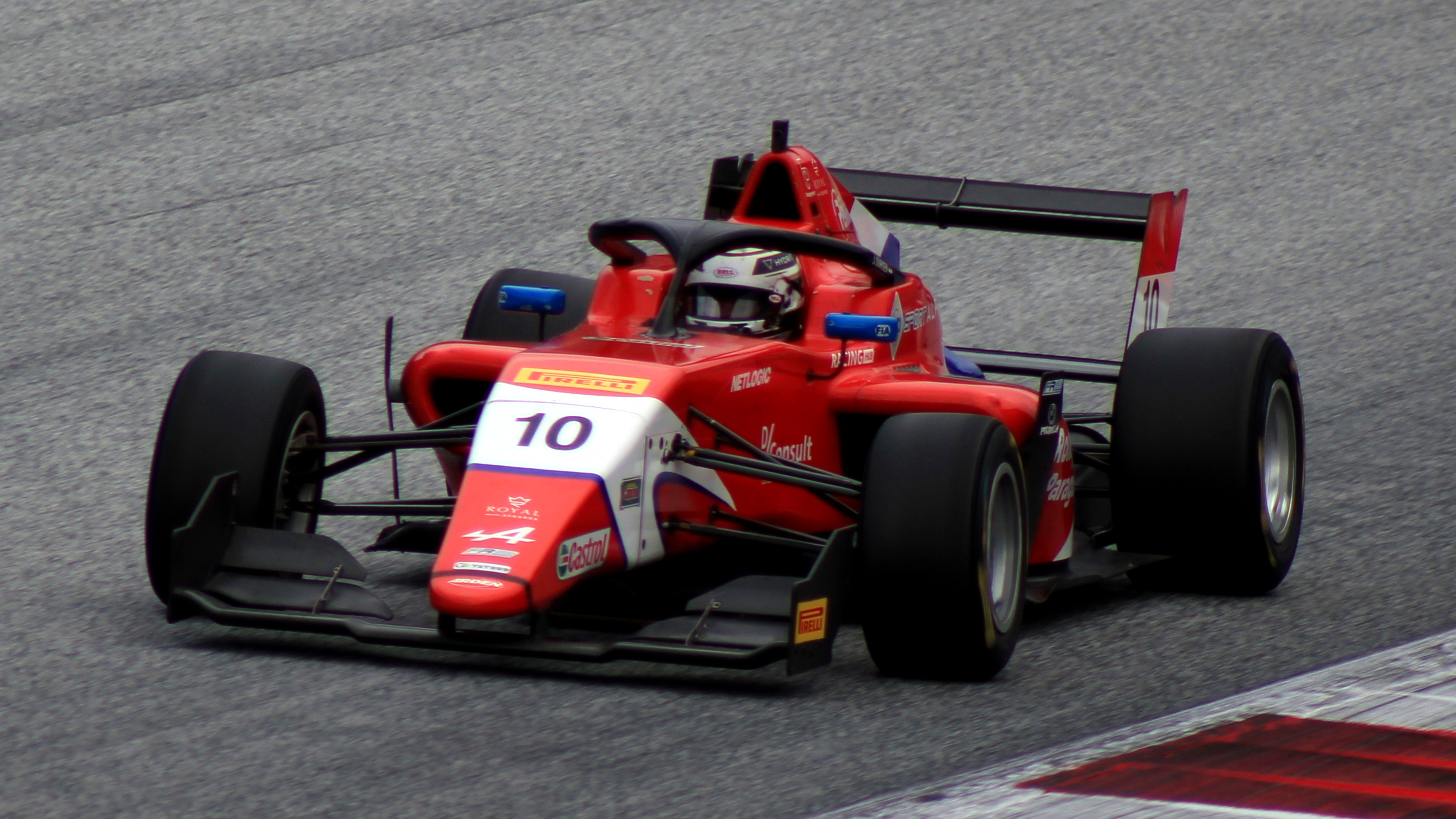
Dǘrksen racing in the 2022 Formula Regional European Championship at the Red Bull Ring

Despite initial difficulties to secure the necessary funding, Dürksen was able to make the step up to the Formula Regional European Championship in 2022, partnering fellow Latin Americans Eduardo Barrichello and Noel León at Arden Motorsport. He declared his dream of making it to Formula One was "more alive than ever". He scored his first points of the season in Imola, and a run of five consecutive points finishes late in the season put Dürksen 14th in the standings, with 40 points.

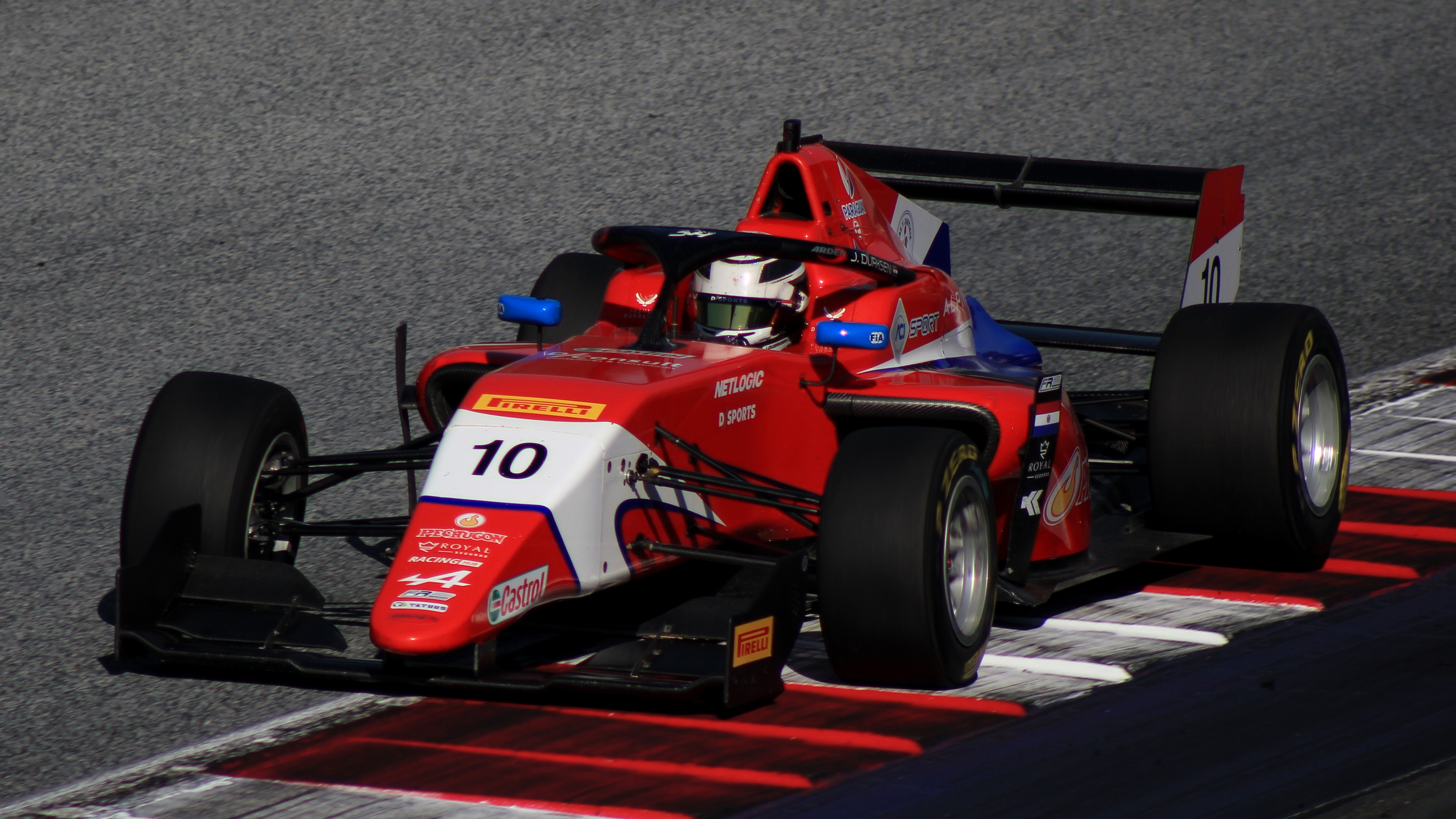
Dürksen racing in the 2023 Formula Regional European Championship at the Red Bull Ring

==== 2023 ====
During the 2023 pre-season, Dürksen joined the Formula Regional Middle East Championship with Hyderabad Blackbirds by MP Motorsport, from the second round onwards. He took pole for the first race of the second round in Kuwait, but was taken out in a collision with Dino Beganovic and teammate Sami Meguetounif. Despite this, Dürksen rebounded in the third race by taking his first Formula Regional podium. He repeated this feat of taking a pole the next round in the second Kuwait round, but similar fortunes followed as he once again collided with Meguetounif. He finished 16th in the standings, with 29 points.

For his main campaign, Dürksen remained with Arden Motorsport for the 2023 Formula Regional European Championship. After failing to score in the opening three rounds, Dürksen made his mark in Spa-Francorchamps, taking his first FRECA podium in a wet race 2 marred by the fatal accident of Dilano van 't Hoff. Dürksen only managed two more points finishes throughout the rest of the season in Paul Ricard and Zandvoort, as he finished the season 19th in the standings, five places lower than the previous year.

=== FIA Formula 3 Championship ===
Dürksen drove for PHM Racing during the 2023 Formula 3 post-season test in Imola.

=== FIA Formula 2 Championship ===
==== 2024 ====
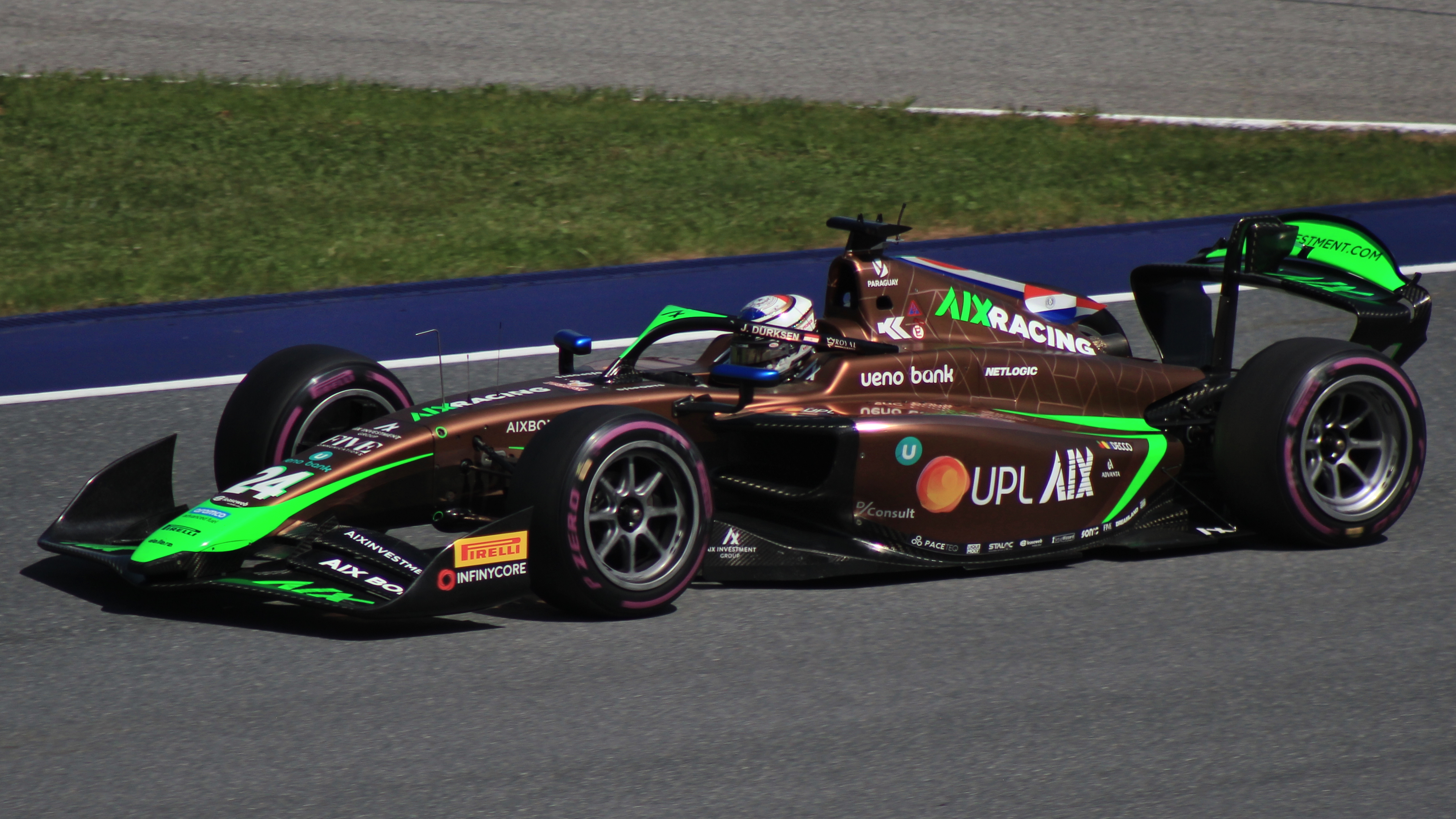
Dürksen driving the Dallara F2 2024 during the 2024 Spielberg Formula 2 round

In November 2023, it was announced that Dürksen would drive in the 2024 FIA Formula 2 Championship for PHM AIX Racing, partnering FIA Formula 3 graduate Taylor Barnard. He failed to score points in the opening three rounds, but came close multiple times to reach the points-paying positions. His breakthrough came in Imola, by qualifying in an impressive fifth. Despite being involved in a first-lap multi car incident during the sprint race, Dürksen claimed the first points and podium for a Paraguayan driver in any international Formula 2 category, with a third-place finish in the feature race. Monaco was disappointing, as a poor qualifying left him at the back and was given a grid penalty for causing a collision with Zane Maloney in the feature race. The Barcelona feature race was a missed opportunity for Dürksen, as his engine expired on lap 17 while he ran in the race lead on the alternate strategy from seventh. Dürksen secured a front row start in Austria, and scored decent points in the races, placing eighth in the sprint and sixth in the feature race.

Dürksen had a disappointing weekend in Silverstone, after he spun after battling Ritomo Miyata for the final points position in the sprint, while his feature race was curtailed early after an incident with Paul Aron. He returned to the points in the Spa-Francorchamps feature race, scoring a point in tenth. Dürksen returned to the podium in the Monza sprint race, where he fought his way from tenth to finish in third place. In the feature race, he demonstrated strong pace once again and a strong start allowed him to finish in fifth place. Baku become a breakthrough for Dürksen, as he managed to score his maiden Formula 2 win by overcoming Christian Mansell and Gabriele Minì mid-race, becoming the first Paraguayan driver to win in any international Formula 2 category. He secured a fifth place the next day in the feature race, concluding his successful weekend.

In Qatar, Dürksen managed to score a point from 16th on the grid in the sprint race, but an unlucky safety car timing whilst running on the alternate strategy left him empty-handed the next day. Dürksen qualified ninth in Yas Marina, and fought for the top positions in the sprint race, but was eliminated in a collision with Amaury Cordeel. Despite that, Dürksen sought redemption in the feature race, as he fought way past Gabriel Bortoleto to take his first feature race victory. His late run of form meant Dürksen finished tenth in the standings, with 87 points, two wins and four podiums.

==== 2025 ====
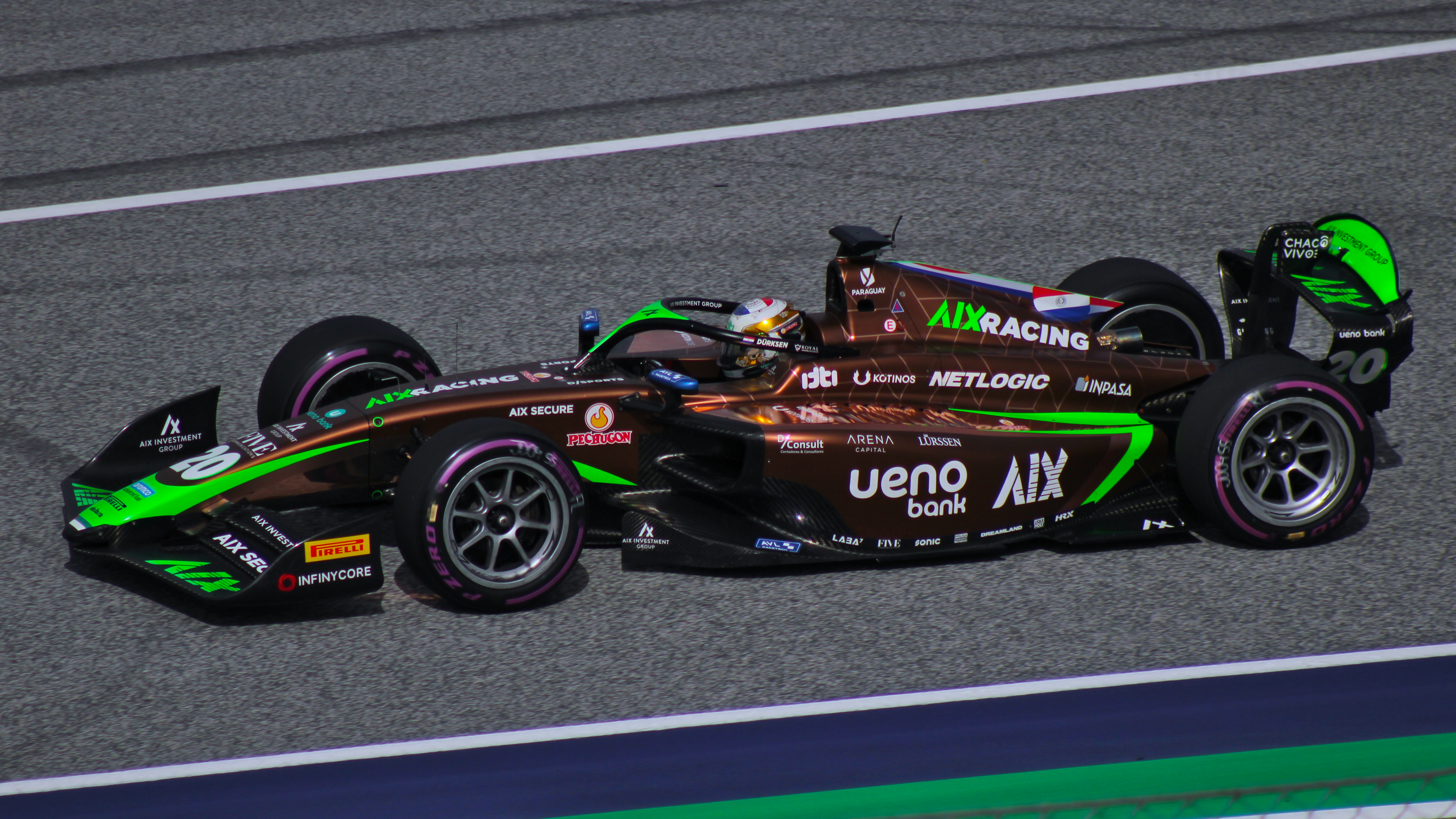
Dürksen driving for AIX Racing during the 2025 Spielberg Formula 2 round

Dürksen remained with AIX Racing for the 2025 season, partnering Cian Shields. He began the season in Melbourne with a win in the sprint race after passing reverse polesitter Leonardo Fornaroli into the first corner. He was again in contention for sprint race victory in Bahrain, but slipped to third in the final laps after defending the lead for much of the race, and was later disqualified for a technical irregularity. In the feature race, he salvaged a tenth place finish. A streak of four scoreless events followed, which included a double retirement in Monaco. Despite starting second during the Barcelona sprint race, he eventually retired in the pits due to a car issue. Dürksen returned to the podium during the Austria sprint race, having lost the lead to Pepe Martí after holding it for the first half of the race. Silverstone provided mixture fortunes for Dürksen; he finished fifth in the sprint race after narrowly holding off Jak Crawford, but spun out from fifth during a safety car restart with two laps to go.

After two further rounds without points, Dürksen secured third place during the sprint in Monza after benefitting from Dino Beganovic's penalty ahead. He earned back-to-back podiums in the feature race following a brief stint in the lead of the race, and a late race defence from Martí. In Baku, despite starting fifteenth in the feature race, Dürksen made up ground following the pit stops and made a few passes to move up to second; he finished in that position having challenged race leader Jak Crawford in the last laps. He repeated this feat in the Qatar sprint race, having briefly led the race at the start before being overtaken by Richard Verschoor. He struggled with race pace in the feature and finished fourteenth. In Yas Marina, Dürksen took another second place in the sprint race, having failed to successfully challenge Arvid Lindblad for the lead. In the feature race, he made his way up to third during the first lap, before cycling his way into the net race lead during the pit stop sequence. Dürksen would then control the field to win the race, becoming the first driver to win the first and last race of a Formula 2 season. His late run of form boosted him to ninth in the drivers' standings, scoring two wins and eight podiums.

==== 2026 ====
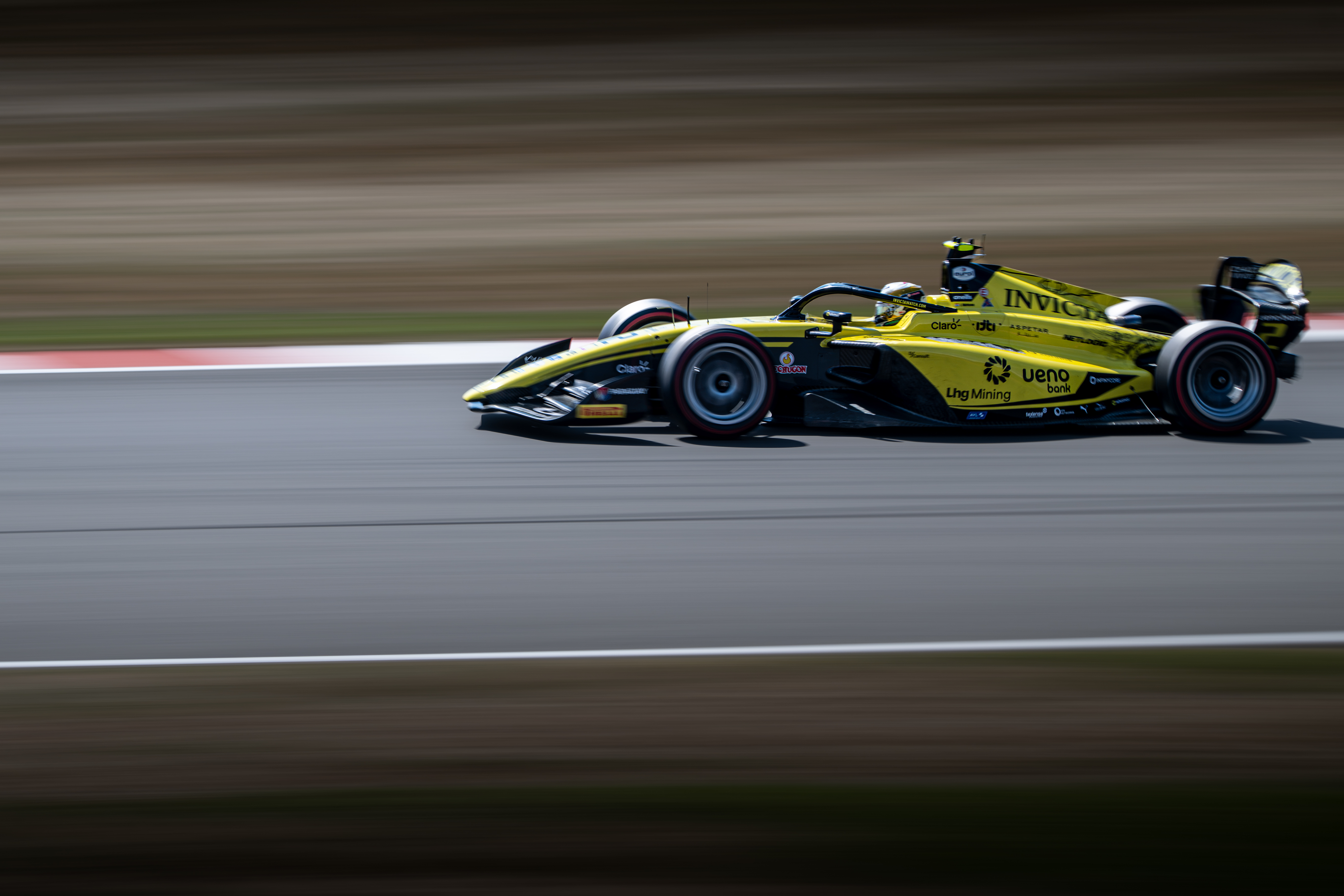
Dürksen driving for Invicta Racing during the 2026 Silverstone Formula 2 round.

In 2026, Dürksen moved to Invicta Racing for his third season in the category, where he partners reigning Formula 3 champion Rafael Câmara.

==== 2027 ====
Dürksen will switch to Hitech for his fourth Formula 2 season in 2027.

=== Formula One ===
In February 2026, Dürksen joined Mercedes to be their development driver in Formula One. He completed his maiden Formula One test in September 2026, driving the Mercedes W15 at the Algarve International Circuit. He became the first Paraguayan in history to drive a Formula One car.

=== Formula E ===
In March 2026, Dürksen debuted in Formula E machinery with Citroën Racing during the 2026 Madrid rookie test.

== Karting record ==
=== Karting career summary ===
| Season | Series | Team | Position |
|---|---|---|---|
| 2017 | Rotax Max Challenge Grand Finals — Junior | | 33rd |

== Racing record ==
=== Racing career summary ===
| Season | Series | Team | Races | Wins | Poles | F/Laps | Podiums | Points | Position |
|---|---|---|---|---|---|---|---|---|---|
| 2019 | Formula 4 UAE Championship | Mücke Motorsport | 20 | 5 | 2 | 4 | 10 | 295 | **2nd** |
| 2019 | Italian F4 Championship | BWT Mücke Motorsport | 21 | 1 | 0 | 0 | 4 | 122 | 8th |
| 2019 | ADAC Formula 4 Championship | ADAC Berlin-Brandenburg | 20 | 0 | 0 | 1 | 2 | 80 | 11th |
| 2020 | ADAC Formula 4 Championship | ADAC Berlin-Brandenburg | 21 | 2 | 1 | 1 | 6 | 191 | 6th |
| 2020 | Italian F4 Championship | BWT Mücke Motorsport | 8 | 1 | 1 | 2 | 2 | 60 | 13th |
| 2021 | Italian F4 Championship | BWT Mücke Motorsport | 21 | 2 | 0 | 2 | 3 | 171 | 6th |
| 2021 | Euroformula Open Championship | Drivex School | 3 | 0 | 0 | 0 | 1 | 29 | 17th |
| 2022 | Formula Regional European Championship | Arden Motorsport | 20 | 0 | 0 | 0 | 0 | 40 | 14th |
| 2023 | Formula Regional Middle East Championship | Hyderabad Blackbirds by MP Motorsport | 6 | 0 | 2 | 0 | 1 | 29 | 16th |
| 2023 | Formula Regional European Championship | Arden Motorsport | 20 | 0 | 0 | 0 | 1 | 26 | 19th |
| 2024 | FIA Formula 2 Championship | PHM AIX Racing; AIX Racing | 28 | 2 | 0 | 2 | 4 | 87 | 10th |
| 2025 | FIA Formula 2 Championship | AIX Racing | 27 | 2 | 0 | 1 | 8 | 107 | 9th |
| 2026 | FIA Formula 2 Championship | Invicta Racing | 21 | 4 | 0 | 1 | 4 | 78 | 8th* |
| 2026 | Formula One | Mercedes-AMG Petronas F1 Team | Development driver | | | | | | |
| 2027 | FIA Formula 2 Championship | Hitech | 0 | 0 | 0 | 0 | 0 | 0 | TBD |

* Season still in progress.

=== Complete Formula 4 UAE Championship results ===
(key) (Races in bold indicate pole position; races in italics indicate fastest lap)

| Year | Team | 1 | 2 | 3 | 4 | 5 | 6 | 7 | 8 | 9 | 10 | 11 | 12 | 13 | 14 | 15 | 16 | 17 | 18 | 19 | 20 | DC | Points |
|---|---|---|---|---|---|---|---|---|---|---|---|---|---|---|---|---|---|---|---|---|---|---|---|
| 2019 | Mücke Motorsport | DUB1; 1; 3 | DUB1; 2; 4 | DUB1; 3; 3 | DUB1; 4; 1 | **YMC1**; **1**; 5 | YMC1; 2; 1 | **YMC1**; **3**; 1 | YMC1; 4; 3 | DUB2; 1; 4 | DUB2; 2; 1 | DUB2; 3; 6 | DUB2; 4; 5 | YMC2; 1; 5 | YMC2; 2; 6 | YMC2; 3; 3 | YMC2; 4; 4 | DUB3; 1 Ret | DUB3; 2; 3 | DUB3; 3; 5 | DUB3; 4; 1 | 2nd | 295 |

=== Complete Italian F4 Championship results ===
(key) (Races in bold indicate pole position) (Races in italics indicate fastest lap)

| Year | Team | 1 | 2 | 3 | 4 | 5 | 6 | 7 | 8 | 9 | 10 | 11 | 12 | 13 | 14 | 15 | 16 | 17 | 18 | 19 | 20 | 21 | 22 | Pos | Points |
|---|---|---|---|---|---|---|---|---|---|---|---|---|---|---|---|---|---|---|---|---|---|---|---|---|---|
| 2019 | BWT Mücke Motorsport | VLL; 1 Ret | VLL; 2; 1 | VLL; 3; 3 | MIS; 1; 11 | MIS; 2; 8 | MIS; 3 C | HUN; 1; 5 | HUN; 2; 9 | HUN; 3; 4 | RBR; 1; 3 | RBR; 2 Ret | RBR; 3; 8 | IMO; 1; 12 | IMO; 2; 17 | IMO; 3; 16 | IMO; 4; 19 | MUG; 1; 24 | MUG; 2; 5 | MUG; 3; 3 | MNZ; 1; 5 | MNZ; 2; 22 | MNZ; 3 Ret | 8th | 122 |
| 2020 | BWT Mücke Motorsport | MIS; 1 | MIS; 2 | MIS; 3 | IMO1; 1 | IMO1; 2 | IMO1; 3 | **RBR**; **1**; 1 | RBR; 2; 15 | RBR; 3; 2 | MUG; 1 | MUG; 2 | MUG; 3 | MNZ; 1 | MNZ; 2 | MNZ; 3 | IMO2; 1; 10 | IMO2; 2; 4 | IMO2; 3; 11 | VLL; 1; 9 | VLL; 2 C | VLL; 3; 9 | | 13th | 60 |
| 2021 | BWT Mücke Motorsport | LEC; 1; 8 | LEC; 2; 5 | LEC; 3; 7 | MIS; 1; 15 | MIS; 2; 15 | MIS; 3; 15 | VLL; 1; 4 | VLL; 2; 4 | VLL; 3 Ret | IMO; 1; 25† | IMO; 2; 4 | IMO; 3; 6 | RBR; 1 Ret | RBR; 2; 5 | RBR; 3; 22 | MUG; 1; 1 | MUG; 2; 4 | MUG; 3; 1 | MNZ; 1; 3 | MNZ; 2; 4 | MNZ; 3; 6 | | 6th | 171 |

=== Complete ADAC Formula 4 Championship results ===
(key) (Races in bold indicate pole position) (Races in italics indicate fastest lap)

| Year | Team | 1 | 2 | 3 | 4 | 5 | 6 | 7 | 8 | 9 | 10 | 11 | 12 | 13 | 14 | 15 | 16 | 17 | 18 | 19 | 20 | 21 | Pos | Points |
|---|---|---|---|---|---|---|---|---|---|---|---|---|---|---|---|---|---|---|---|---|---|---|---|---|
| 2019 | ADAC Berlin-Brandenburg | OSC; 1; 9 | OSC; 2; 5 | OSC; 3; 2 | RBR; 1 Ret | RBR; 2; 9 | RBR; 3; 20 | HOC; 1; 20 | HOC; 2; 12 | ZAN; 1 Ret | ZAN; 2; 10 | ZAN; 3 Ret | NÜR; 1; 11 | NÜR; 2; 7 | NÜR; 3 Ret | HOC; 1; 3 | HOC; 2; 4 | HOC; 3; 9 | SAC; 1 Ret | SAC; 2; 6 | SAC; 3; 10 | | 11th | 80 |
| 2020 | ADAC Berlin-Brandenburg | LAU1; 1; 2 | LAU1; 2; 11 | LAU1; 3; 9 | NÜR1; 1; 9 | NÜR1; 2; 6 | NÜR1; 3; 1 | **HOC**; **1**; 1 | HOC; 2; 11 | HOC; 3; 5 | NÜR2; 1; 2 | NÜR2; 2; 9 | NÜR2; 3 Ret | RBR; 1; 9 | RBR; 2; 3 | RBR; 3; 12 | LAU2; 1; 4 | LAU2; 2; 4 | LAU2; 3; 7 | OSC; 1; 2 | OSC; 2; 7 | OSC; 3; 5 | 6th | 191 |

=== Complete Euroformula Open Championship results ===
(key) (Races in bold indicate pole position; races in italics indicate points for the fastest lap of top ten finishers)

| Year | Entrant | 1 | 2 | 3 | 4 | 5 | 6 | 7 | 8 | 9 | 10 | 11 | 12 | 13 | 14 | 15 | 16 | 17 | 18 | 19 | 20 | 21 | 22 | 23 | 24 | DC | Points |
|---|---|---|---|---|---|---|---|---|---|---|---|---|---|---|---|---|---|---|---|---|---|---|---|---|---|---|---|
| 2021 | Drivex School | POR; 1 | POR; 2 | POR; 3 | LEC; 1 | LEC; 2 | LEC; 3 | SPA; 1 | SPA; 2 | SPA; 3 | HUN; 1; 3 | HUN; 2; 5 | HUN; 3; 8 | IMO; 1 | IMO; 2 | IMO; 3 | RBR; 1 | RBR; 2 | RBR; 3 | MNZ; 1 | MNZ; 2 | MNZ; 3 | CAT; 1 | CAT; 2 | CAT; 3 | 17th | 29 |

=== Complete Formula Regional European Championship results ===
(key) (Races in bold indicate pole position) (Races in italics indicate fastest lap)

| Year | Team | 1 | 2 | 3 | 4 | 5 | 6 | 7 | 8 | 9 | 10 | 11 | 12 | 13 | 14 | 15 | 16 | 17 | 18 | 19 | 20 | Pos | Points |
|---|---|---|---|---|---|---|---|---|---|---|---|---|---|---|---|---|---|---|---|---|---|---|---|
| 2022 | Arden Motorsport | MNZ; 1; 19 | MNZ; 2; 14 | IMO; 1; 6 | IMO; 2; 12 | MCO; 1; 12 | MCO; 2; 10 | LEC; 1; 13 | LEC; 2; 12 | ZAN; 1 Ret | ZAN; 2; 18 | HUN; 1; 15 | HUN; 2 Ret | SPA; 1; 21 | SPA; 2; 14 | RBR; 1; 6 | RBR; 2; 6 | CAT; 1; 10 | CAT; 2; 6 | MUG; 1; 9 | MUG; 2; 13 | 14th | 40 |
| 2023 | Arden Motorsport | IMO; 1; 15 | IMO; 2 Ret | CAT; 1; 18 | CAT; 2; 21 | HUN; 1; 20 | HUN; 2; 14 | SPA; 1; 10 | SPA; 2; 3 | MUG; 1; 14 | MUG; 2; 23† | LEC; 1; 18 | LEC; 2; 9 | RBR; 1; 16 | RBR; 2 NC | MNZ; 1; 22 | MNZ; 2 Ret | ZAN; 1; 14 | ZAN; 2; 7 | HOC; 1; 17 | HOC; 2; 14 | 19th | 26 |

=== Complete Formula Regional Middle East Championship results ===
(key) (Races in bold indicate pole position) (Races in italics indicate fastest lap)

| Year | Entrant | 1 | 2 | 3 | 4 | 5 | 6 | 7 | 8 | 9 | 10 | 11 | 12 | 13 | 14 | 15 | DC | Points |
|---|---|---|---|---|---|---|---|---|---|---|---|---|---|---|---|---|---|---|
| 2023 | Hyderabad Blackbirds by MP | DUB1; 1 | DUB1; 2 | DUB1; 3 | **KUW1**; **1** Ret | KUW1; 2; 7 | KUW1; 3; 3 | **KUW2**; **1**; 26† | KUW2; 2; 15 | KUW2; 3; 6 | DUB2; 1 | DUB2; 2 | DUB2; 3 | ABU; 1 | ABU; 2 | ABU; 3 | 16th | 29 |

† – Driver did not finish the race but was classified, as he completed more than 90% of the race distance.

=== Complete FIA Formula 2 Championship results ===
(key) (Races in bold indicate pole position) (Races in italics indicate fastest lap)

| Year | Entrant | 1 | 2 | 3 | 4 | 5 | 6 | 7 | 8 | 9 | 10 | 11 | 12 | 13 | 14 | 15 | 16 | 17 | 18 | 19 | 20 | 21 | 22 | 23 | 24 | 25 | 26 | 27 | 28 | 29 | DC | Points |
|---|---|---|---|---|---|---|---|---|---|---|---|---|---|---|---|---|---|---|---|---|---|---|---|---|---|---|---|---|---|---|---|---|
| 2024 | AIX Racing (Note: Prior to the fourth round at Imola, the team was entered as PHM AIX Racing.) | BHR; SPR; 15 | BHR; FEA; 11 | JED; SPR; 9 | JED; FEA; 12 | MEL; SPR; 17 | MEL; FEA; Ret | IMO; SPR; Ret | IMO; FEA; 3 | MON; SPR; 18 | MON; FEA; 18† | CAT; SPR; 10 | CAT; FEA; Ret | RBR; SPR; 8 | RBR; FEA; 6 | SIL; SPR; 16 | SIL; FEA; Ret | HUN; SPR; 18 | HUN; FEA; 19 | SPA; SPR; 19 | SPA; FEA; 10 | MNZ; SPR; 3 | MNZ; FEA; 5 | BAK; SPR; 1 | BAK; FEA; 5 | LSL; SPR; 8 | LSL; FEA; 13 | YMC; SPR; Ret | YMC; FEA; 1 | | 10th | 87 |
| 2025 | AIX Racing | MEL; SPR; 1 | MEL; FEA; C | BHR; SPR; DSQ | BHR; FEA; 10 | JED; SPR; 12 | JED; FEA; 11 | IMO; SPR; 11 | IMO; FEA; 13 | MON; SPR; Ret | MON; FEA; Ret | CAT; SPR; NC | CAT; FEA; 17 | RBR; SPR; 2 | RBR; FEA; 13 | SIL; SPR; 5 | SIL; FEA; 20† | SPA; SPR; 11 | SPA; FEA; 11 | HUN; SPR; 11 | HUN; FEA; 12 | MNZ; SPR; 3 | MNZ; FEA; 2 | BAK; SPR; 9 | BAK; FEA; 2 | LSL; SPR; 2 | LSL; FEA; 14 | YMC; SPR; 2 | YMC; FEA; 1 | | 9th | 107 |
| 2026 | Invicta Racing | MEL; SPR; 1 | MEL; FEA; 10 | MIA; SPR; 5 | MIA; FEA; 10 | MTL; SPR; Ret | MTL; FEA; 11 | MON; SPR; 4 | MON; FEA; 15 | CAT; SPR; 20 | CAT; FEA; 14 | RBR; SPR; Ret | RBR; FEA; 9 | SIL; SPR; 8 | SIL; FEA; 9 | SPA; SPR; 1 | SPA; FEA; 14 | HUN; SPR; 7 | HUN; FEA; 8 | MNZ; SPR; 1 | MNZ; FEA; 1 | MAD; SPR; 14 | MAD; FEA; 4 | BAK; SPR; Ret | BAK; FEA1; Ret | BAK; FEA2; 13 | LSL; SPR | LSL; FEA | YMC; SPR | YMC; FEA | 8th* | 90* |
| 2027 | Hitech | BHR; SPR | BHR; FEA | JED; SPR | JED; FEA | MEL; SPR | MEL; FEA | MTL; SPR | MTL; FEA | MON; SPR | MON; FEA | SIL; SPR | SIL; FEA | RBR; SPR | RBR; FEA | MNZ; SPR | MNZ; FEA | MAD; SPR | MAD; FEA | BAK; SPR | BAK; FEA | IST; SPR | IST; FEA | MXC; SPR | MXC; FEA | LSL; SPR | LSL; FEA | YMC; SPR | YMC; FEA | | TBD | TBD |

* Season still in progress.
