= 2024 Lusail Formula 2 round =

Motor racing event in Lusail, Qatar

(Qatar) 2024 Lusail Formula 2 round
Round details
- Round 13 of 14 in the 2024 FIA Formula 2 Championship.
- Location: Lusail International Circuit, Lusail, Qatar
- Course: Street Circuit; 5.419 km (3.367 mi)

Sprint Race
- Date: 30 November 2024
- Laps: 23
Podium
First	(United Kingdom) Oliver Bearman	Prema Racing
Second	(United States) Jak Crawford	DAMS Lucas Oil
Third	(Netherlands) Richard Verschoor	MP Motorsport
Fastest lap
Driver	(Netherlands) Richard Verschoor	MP Motorsport
- Time: 1:38.630 (on lap 20)

Feature Race
- Date: 1 December 2024
- Laps: 32
Pole position
Driver	(Estonia) Paul Aron	Hitech Pulse-Eight
Time	1:35.115	
Podium
First	(Estonia) Paul Aron	Hitech Pulse-Eight
Second	(France) Isack Hadjar	Campos Racing
Third	(Brazil) Gabriel Bortoleto	Invicta Racing
Fastest lap
Driver	(United Kingdom) Oliver Bearman	Prema Racing
- Time: 1:37.997 (on lap 30)

The 2024 Lusail FIA Formula 2 round was a motor racing event held between 29 November and 1 December 2024 and was the first time Formula 2 raced at the Lusail International Circuit, Lusail, Qatar. It was the penultimate round of the 2024 FIA Formula 2 Championship and was held in support of the 2024 Qatar Grand Prix.

== Driver Changes ==
Four drivers left the Formula 2 grid ahead of the Lusail round. Juan Manuel Correa left DAMS Lucas Oil and was replaced by Ferrari junior Dino Beganovic, who finished the F3 championship in sixth position.

Dennis Hauger was confirmed to join Andretti Global for the 2025 Indy NXT season and decided to leave MP Motorsport for the last two rounds of the season to focus on next year. Richard Verschoor, who has driven for MP Motorsport in previous seasons, returned to the team to replace Hauger until the end of next season. Verschoor's seat at Trident was filled by American F3 graduate Max Esterson.

Cian Shields joined AIX Racing for the remainder of the season, after the departure of Niels Koolen, who replaced Taylor Barnard for the Monza and Baku rounds.

Van Amersfoort Racing driver Enzo Fittipaldi left F2 before the final two rounds following his appointment by Arrow McLaren as an evaluation test driver for IndyCar. In his place, the team announced John Bennett, the runner-up of the GB3 Championship.

== Classification ==
=== Qualifying ===
Pos.	No.	Driver	Entrant	Time/Gap	Grid SR	Grid FR
1	17	(Estonia) Paul Aron	Hitech Pulse-Eight	1:35.115	9	1
2	10	(Brazil) Gabriel Bortoleto	Invicta Racing	+0.335	8	2
3	1	(France) Victor Martins	ART Grand Prix	+0.455	7	3
4	8	(Sweden) Dino Beganovic	DAMS Lucas Oil	+0.657	6	4
5	11	(Netherlands) Richard Verschoor	MP Motorsport	+0.732	5	5
6	7	(United States) Jak Crawford	DAMS Lucas Oil	+0.980	4	6
7	9	(India) Kush Maini	Invicta Racing	+0.985	12^{1}	7
8	12	(Germany) Oliver Goethe	MP Motorsport	+1.036	3	8
9	20	(France) Isack Hadjar	Campos Racing	+1.072	2	9
10	3	(United Kingdom) Oliver Bearman	Prema Racing	+1.099	1	10
11	4	(Italy) Kimi Antonelli	Prema Racing	+1.321	10	11
12	21	(Spain) Pepe Martí	Campos Racing	+1.361	DNS	12
13	22	(United States) Max Esterson	Trident	+1.610	13	13
14	2	(United Kingdom) Luke Browning	ART Grand Prix	+1.614	14	14
15	6	(Japan) Ritomo Miyata	Rodin Motorsport	+1.641	15	15
16	24	(Paraguay) Joshua Dürksen	AIX Racing	+1.730	16	16
17	5	(Barbados) Zane Maloney	Rodin Motorsport	+1.746	17	17
18	16	(Belgium) Amaury Cordeel	Hitech Pulse-Eight	+1.926	18	18
19	14	(United Kingdom) John Bennett	Van Amersfoort Racing	+2.163	19	19
20	23	(Australia) Christian Mansell	Trident	+2.274	20	20
21	15	(Mexico) Rafael Villagómez	Van Amersfoort Racing	+2.937	21	21
22	25	(United Kingdom) Cian Shields	AIX Racing	+3.221	22	22

Notes

- ^1 – Kush Maini received a five-place grid penalty in the previous round for causing a collision at the start of the feature race. He was handed an additional three-place grid penalty for impeding John Bennett during qualifying.

=== Sprint race ===
Pos.	No.	Driver	Entrant	Laps	Time/Retired	Grid	Points
1	3	(United Kingdom) Oliver Bearman	Prema Racing	23	40:51.281	1	10
2	7	(United States) Jak Crawford	DAMS Lucas Oil	23	+0.295	4	8
3	11	(Netherlands) Richard Verschoor	MP Motorsport	23	+0.580	5	6 (1)
4	20	(France) Isack Hadjar	Campos Racing	23	+0.910	2	5
5	10	(Brazil) Gabriel Bortoleto	Invicta Racing	23	+1.227	8	4
6	5	(Barbados) Zane Maloney	Rodin Motorsport	23	+1.751	17	3
7	17	(Estonia) Paul Aron	Hitech Pulse-Eight	23	+1.059^{1}	9	2
8	24	(Paraguay) Joshua Dürksen	AIX Racing	23	+1.905	16	1
9	1	(France) Victor Martins	ART Grand Prix	23	+2.868	7	
10	8	(Sweden) Dino Beganovic	DAMS Lucas Oil	23	+3.223	6	
11	2	(United Kingdom) Luke Browning	ART Grand Prix	23	+3.532	14	
12	14	(United Kingdom) John Bennett	Van Amersfoort Racing	23	+4.151	19	
13	6	(Japan) Ritomo Miyata	Rodin Motorsport	23	+1.544^{2}	15	
14	22	(United States) Max Esterson	Trident	23	+4.760	13	
15	23	(Australia) Christian Mansell	Trident	23	+5.340	20	
16	16	(Belgium) Amaury Cordeel	Hitech Pulse-Eight	23	+6.053	19	
17	15	(Mexico) Rafael Villagómez	Van Amersfoort Racing	23	+6.517	21	
18	25	(United Kingdom) Cian Shields	AIX Racing	23	+6.966	22	
19^{3}	4	(Italy) Andrea Kimi Antonelli	Prema Racing	20	Collision	10	
20^{3}	9	(India) Kush Maini	Invicta Racing	20	Collision	12	
DNF	12	(Germany) Oliver Goethe	MP Motorsport	4	Engine	3	
DNS	21	(Spain) Pepe Martí	Campos Racing	0	Malfunction	11	
Fastest lap set by (Netherlands) Richard Verschoor: 1:38.630 (lap 20)

Notes

- ^1 - Paul Aron received a two-place penalty for causing a collision with Victor Martins.
- ^2 - Ritomo Miyata received two penalties: a four-place penalty for causing a collision with Dino Beganovic and a two-place penalty for causing a collision with Andrea Kimi Antonelli.
- ^3 - Andrea Kimi Antonelli and Kush Maini did not finish the race, but were classified as they completed more than 90% of the race distance.

=== Feature race ===
Pos.	No.	Driver	Entrant	Laps	Time/Retired	Grid	Points
1	17	(Estonia) Paul Aron	Hitech Pulse-Eight	30	55:45.433	1	25 (3)
2	20	(France) Isack Hadjar	Campos Racing	30	+2.763	9	18
3	10	(Brazil) Gabriel Bortoleto	Invicta Racing	30	+3.175^{1}	2	15
4	12	(Germany) Oliver Goethe	MP Motorsport	30	+3.796	8	12
5	8	(Sweden) Dino Beganovic	DAMS Lucas Oil	30	+5.727	4	10
6	23	(Australia) Christian Mansell	Trident	30	+11.509	12	8
7	16	(Belgium) Amaury Cordeel	Hitech Pulse-Eight	30	+12.556	18	6
8	14	(United Kingdom) John Bennett	Van Amersfoort Racing	30	+18.862	19	4
9	5	(Barbados) Zane Maloney	Rodin Motorsport	30	+19.818	17	2
10	6	(Japan) Ritomo Miyata	Rodin Motorsport	30	+23.297	15	1
11	25	(United Kingdom) Cian Shields	AIX Racing	30	+32.320	22	
12	3	(United Kingdom) Oliver Bearman	Prema Racing	30	+33.737	10	
13	24	(Paraguay) Joshua Dürksen	AIX Racing	30	+46.123	16	
14	9	(India) Kush Maini	Invicta Racing	30	+51.909	7	
15	2	(United Kingdom) Luke Browning	ART Grand Prix	30	+53.372	14	
16	21	(Spain) Pepe Martí	Campos Racing	30	+65.023	12	
17	11	(Netherlands) Richard Verschoor	MP Motorsport	30	+69.043^{2}	14	
18	22	(United States) Max Esterson	Trident	30	+75.033	13	
NC^{3}	1	(France) Victor Martins	ART Grand Prix	25	+5 laps	3	
DNF	7	(United States) Jak Crawford	DAMS Lucas Oil	13	Accident damage	6	
DNF	15	(Mexico) Rafael Villagómez	Van Amersfoort Racing	12	Collision	21	
DNF	4	(Italy) Andrea Kimi Antonelli	Prema Racing	7	Accident damage	11	
Fastest lap set by (United Kingdom) Oliver Bearman: 1:37.997 (lap 30)

Notes

- ^1 - Gabriel Bortoleto finished first on the road, but received a five-second penalty for crossing the pit lane line after the bollard, which dropped him down to third place.
- ^2 - Richard Verschoor received a ten-second penalty for an unsafe release in the pit lane and a ten second stop-and-go penalty for unlapping himself during a Safety Car period without authorisation; because the penalty was not served during the race, it was converted into a 30 second time penalty.
- ^3 - Victor Martins took the chequered flag, but was not classified as he only completed 25 laps of racing, which constituted less than 90% of the race distance.

== Standings after the event ==
Drivers' Championship standings

	Pos.	Driver	Points
	1	(Brazil) Gabriel Bortoleto	188.5
	2	(France) Isack Hadjar	188
1	3	(Estonia) Paul Aron	163
1	4	(Barbados) Zane Maloney	140
	5	(United States) Jak Crawford	124

Teams' Championship standings

	Pos.	Team	Points
	1	(United Kingdom) Invicta Racing	262.5
	2	(Spain) Campos Racing	231
	3	(Netherlands) MP Motorsport	200.5
2	4	(United Kingdom) Hitech Pulse-Eight	198
1	5	(Italy) Prema Racing	179

- Note: Only the top five positions are included for both sets of standings.

== See also ==
- 2024 Qatar Grand Prix

Previous round: 2024 Baku Formula 2 round	FIA Formula 2 Championship; 2024 season	Next round: 2024 Yas Island Formula 2 round
Previous round: 2009 Qatar GP2 Asia Series round	Lusail Formula 2 round	Next round: 2025 Lusail Formula 2 round
