= 2024 Yas Island Formula 2 round =

Motor racing event in Abu Dhabi

(United Arab Emirates) 2024 Yas Island Formula 2 round
Round details
- Round 14 of 14 in the 2024 FIA Formula 2 Championship.
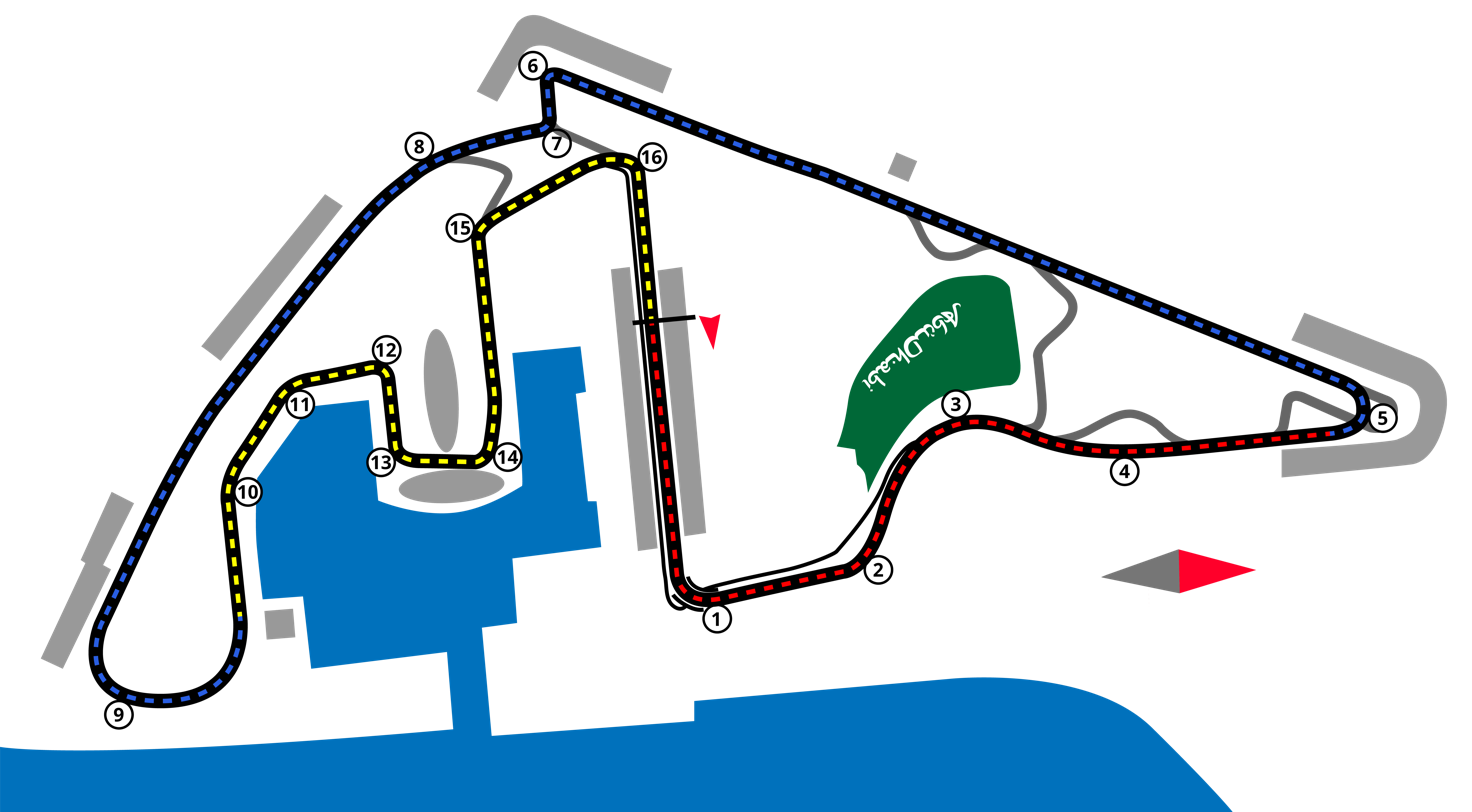
- Location: Yas Marina Circuit, Abu Dhabi, United Arab Emirates
- Course: Permanent Circuit; 5.281 km (3.281 mi)

Sprint race
- Date: 7 December 2024
- Laps: 23
Podium
First	(Spain) Pepe Martí	Campos Racing
Second	(Brazil) Gabriel Bortoleto	Invicta Racing
Third	(Sweden) Dino Beganovic	DAMS Lucas Oil
Fastest lap
Driver	(France) Victor Martins	ART Grand Prix
- Time: 1:39.427 (on lap 5)

Feature race
- Date: 8 December 2024
- Laps: 33
Pole position
Driver	(France) Victor Martins	ART Grand Prix
Time	1:35.745	
Podium
First	(Paraguay) Joshua Dürksen	AIX Racing
Second	(Brazil) Gabriel Bortoleto	Invicta Racing
Third	(Netherlands) Richard Verschoor	MP Motorsport
Fastest lap
Driver	(Netherlands) Richard Verschoor	MP Motorsport
- Time: 1:38.923 (on lap 29)

The 2024 Yas Island Formula 2 round was a motor racing event that held between 6 and 8 December 2024 at the Yas Marina Circuit, Abu Dhabi, United Arab Emirates. It was the final race of the 2024 Formula 2 Championship and was held in support of the 2024 Abu Dhabi Grand Prix.

Gabriel Bortoleto won the drivers' title after finishing second in the Feature Race behind eventual race winner Joshua Dürksen. His nearest rival Isack Hadjar suffered a problem at the start already, which caused him to drop down to the back of the field with no chance of making a comeback. Bortoleto became the fourth rookie in the modern Formula 2 era to win the championship and the fourth driver after Charles Leclerc, George Russell and Oscar Piastri to win both Formula 2 and Formula 3 championships in consecutive seasons as a rookie.

== Background ==
=== Driver Changes ===
Zane Maloney departed Rodin Motorsport ahead of the final race at Yas Marina as he moved to Lola Yamaha ABT in Formula E, which started its 2024–25 season at the same weekend. Reigning FIA Formula 3 Champion Leonardo Fornaroli replaced him ahead of a full-time graduation in 2025 with Invicta Racing.

=== Championship standings before the round ===
Going into the final round of the season, championship leader Gabriel Bortoleto and runner-up Isack Hadjar were only separated by half a point in the drivers' standings, having scored 188.5 points and 188 points across the previous 13 rounds, respectively. Paul Aron, who entered the round as third-placed driver, had only outsider chances on the championship title, being 25.5 points further behind Bortoleto in the standings.

In the teams' standings, Invicta Racing led with 262.5 points, 30.5 points ahead of Campos Racing on 231 points, 62 points ahead of MP Motorsport on 200.5 points and 64.5 points ahead of Hitech Pulse-Eight with 65 points still available.

== Classification ==
=== Qualifying ===
Pos.	No.	Driver	Entrant	Time/Gap	Grid SR	Grid FR
1	1	(France) Victor Martins	ART Grand Prix	1:35.745	10	1
2	10	(Brazil) Gabriel Bortoleto	Invicta Racing	+0.035	9	2
3	17	(Estonia) Paul Aron	Hitech Pulse-Eight	+0.068	7	PL^{1}
4	20	(France) Isack Hadjar	Campos Racing	+0.128	6	3
5	8	(Sweden) Dino Beganovic	DAMS Lucas Oil	+0.161	5	4
6	9	(India) Kush Maini	Invicta Racing	+0.205	8^{2}	5
7	21	(Spain) Pepe Martí	Campos Racing	+0.312	4	6
8	6	(Japan) Ritomo Miyata	Rodin Motorsport	+0.370	3	7
9	24	(Paraguay) Joshua Dürksen	AIX Racing	+0.397^{3}	2	8
10	16	(Belgium) Amaury Cordeel	Hitech Pulse-Eight	+0.397^{3}	1	9
11	4	(Italy) Andrea Kimi Antonelli	Prema Racing	+0.645	WD	WD
12	12	(Germany) Oliver Goethe	MP Motorsport	+0.671	11	11
13	5	(Italy) Leonardo Fornaroli	Rodin Motorsport	+0.705	12	12
14	11	(Netherlands) Richard Verschoor	MP Motorsport	+0.710	13	13
15	3	(United Kingdom) Oliver Bearman	Prema Racing	+0.802	14	14
16	7	(United States) Jak Crawford	DAMS Lucas Oil	+1.008	20^{5}	15
17	2	(United Kingdom) Luke Browning	ART Grand Prix	+1.201	15	16
18	15	(Mexico) Rafael Villagómez	Van Amersfoort Racing	+1.240	16	17
19	22	(United States) Max Esterson	Trident	+1.684	17	18
20	14	(United Kingdom) John Bennett	Van Amersfoort Racing	+1.889	18	19
21	23	(Australia) Christian Mansell	Trident	+2.389	19	20
22	25	(United Kingdom) Cian Shields	AIX Racing	+3.023	21	21

Notes

- ^1 – Paul Aron was required to start the Feature Race from the pit lane, in addition to being disqualified from the Sprint Race, due to a breach of the Technical regulations. All drivers who qualified fourth or below was promoted by one grid position.
- ^2 – Kush Maini received a three-place grid penalty for impeding Jak Crawford during qualifying.
- ^3 – Joshua Dürksen and Amaury Cordeel set the same time in qualifying. Dürsken is qualified ahead as he set his time before Cordeel.
- ^4 – Andrea Kimi Antonelli withdrew from the sprint race due to illness. Every driver who qualified twelfth or below was promoted one place on the sprint grid.
- ^5 – Jak Crawford received a five-place grid penalty for causing a collision with Rafael Villagómez at the previous round.

=== Sprint race ===
Pos.	No.	Driver	Entrant	Laps	Time/Retired	Grid	Points
1	21	(Spain) Pepe Martí	Campos Racing	23	38:36.039	4	10 (1)
2	10	(Brazil) Gabriel Bortoleto	Invicta Racing	23	+2.286	9	8
3	8	(Sweden) Dino Beganovic	DAMS Lucas Oil	23	+18.828	5	6
4	3	(United Kingdom) Oliver Bearman	Prema Racing	23	+19.547^{1}	8	5
5	20	(France) Isack Hadjar	Campos Racing	23	+22.980	6	4
6	2	(United Kingdom) Luke Browning	ART Grand Prix	23	+26.798	15	3
7	11	(Netherlands) Richard Verschoor	MP Motorsport	23	+27.896	13	2
8	7	(United States) Jak Crawford	DAMS Lucas Oil	23	+29.768	20	1
9	12	(Germany) Oliver Goethe	MP Motorsport	23	+31.618	11	
10	5	(Italy) Leonardo Fornaroli	Rodin Motorsport	23	+33.307	12	
11	6	(Japan) Ritomo Miyata	Rodin Motorsport	23	+33.784^{2}	3	
12	15	(Mexico) Rafael Villagómez	Van Amersfoort Racing	23	+34.727	16	
13	16	(Belgium) Amaury Cordeel	Hitech Pulse-Eight	23	+36.268^{3}	1	
14	22	(United States) Max Esterson	Trident	23	+40.756	17	
15	14	(United Kingdom) John Bennett	Van Amersfoort Racing	23	+43.493^{1}	18	
16	23	(Australia) Christian Mansell	Trident	23	+45.303	19	
17	9	(India) Kush Maini	Invicta Racing	23	+52.570	8	
18	25	(United Kingdom) Cian Shields	AIX Racing	23	+1:00.505	21	
19	1	(France) Victor Martins	ART Grand Prix	22	+1 lap	10	
DNF	24	(Paraguay) Joshua Dürksen	AIX Racing	18	Collision	2	
DSQ	17	(Estonia) Paul Aron	Hitech Pulse-Eight	23	Disqualified^{4}	7	
WD^{5}	4	(Italy) Andrea Kimi Antonelli	Prema Racing	—	Illness	—	
Fastest lap set by (France) Victor Martins: 1:39.427 (lap 5)

Notes

- ^1 - Oliver Bearman and John Bennett each received a five-second time penalty for repeatedly exceeding track limits.
- ^2 - Ritomo Miyata received a ten-second time penalty for causing a collision with Victor Martins.
- ^3 - Amaury Cordeel received a ten-second time penalty for causing a collision with Joshua Dürksen.
- ^4 - Paul Aron finished third on the road, but was later disqualified for having a modified DRS-actuator opening too wide. Dino Beganovic inherited the final podium position.
- ^5 - Andrea Kimi Antonelli was scheduled to start eleventh, but withdrew due to illness.

=== Feature race ===
Pos.	No.	Driver	Entrant	Laps	Time/Retired	Grid	Points
1	24	(Paraguay) Joshua Dürksen	AIX Racing	33	56:23.715	8	25
2	10	(Brazil) Gabriel Bortoleto	Invicta Racing	33	+1.791	2	18
3	11	(Netherlands) Richard Verschoor	MP Motorsport	33	+5.370	13	15 (1)
4	1	(France) Victor Martins	ART Grand Prix	33	+7.337	1	12 (2)
5	3	(United Kingdom) Oliver Bearman	Prema Racing	33	+10.316	13	10
6	21	(Spain) Pepe Martí	Campos Racing	33	+18.177	6	8
7	8	(Sweden) Dino Beganovic	DAMS Lucas Oil	33	+19.769	4	6
8	16	(Belgium) Amaury Cordeel	Hitech Pulse-Eight	33	+19.873	9	4
9	12	(Germany) Oliver Goethe	MP Motorsport	33	+21.031	10	2
10	6	(Japan) Ritomo Miyata	Rodin Motorsport	33	+23.331	7	1
11	17	(Estonia) Paul Aron	Hitech Pulse-Eight	33	+23.424	PL	
12	9	(India) Kush Maini	Invicta Racing	33	+29.795	5	
13	5	(Italy) Leonardo Fornaroli	Rodin Motorsport	33	+30.390	11	
14	14	(United Kingdom) John Bennett	Van Amersfoort Racing	33	+33.707	18	
15	2	(United Kingdom) Luke Browning	ART Grand Prix	33	+38.946	15	
16	23	(Australia) Christian Mansell	Trident	33	+42.503	19	
17	22	(United States) Max Esterson	Trident	33	+43.524	17	
18	25	(United Kingdom) Cian Shields	AIX Racing	33	+1:02.248	20	
19	20	(France) Isack Hadjar	Campos Racing	32	+1 lap	3	
DNF	15	(Mexico) Rafael Villagómez	Van Amersfoort Racing	4	Collision damage	16	
DNF	7	(United States) Jak Crawford	DAMS Lucas Oil	4	Collision damage	14	
WD	4	(Italy) Andrea Kimi Antonelli	Prema Racing	—	Illness	—	
Fastest lap set by (Netherlands) Richard Verschoor: 1:38.923 (lap 29)

== Final championship standings ==
Drivers' Championship standings

Pos.	Driver	Points
1	(Brazil) Gabriel Bortoleto	214.5
2	(France) Isack Hadjar	192
3	(Estonia) Paul Aron	163
4	(Barbados) Zane Maloney	140
5	(United States) Jak Crawford	125

Teams' Championship standings

Pos.	Team	Points
1	(United Kingdom) Invicta Racing	288.5
2	(Spain) Campos Racing	254
3	(Netherlands) MP Motorsport	220.5
4	(United Kingdom) Hitech Pulse-Eight	202
5	(Italy) Prema Racing	194

- Note: Only the top five positions are included for both sets of standings.
- Note: Bold names include the 2024 Drivers' and Teams' Champion respectively.

== See also ==
- 2024 Abu Dhabi Grand Prix

== Notes ==
Previous round: 2024 Lusail Formula 2 round	FIA Formula 2 Championship; 2024 season	Next round: 2025 Melbourne Formula 2 round
Previous round: 2023 Yas Island Formula 2 round	Yas Island Formula 2 round	Next round: 2025 Yas Island Formula 2 round
