= Cian Shields =

Racing driver (born 2005)

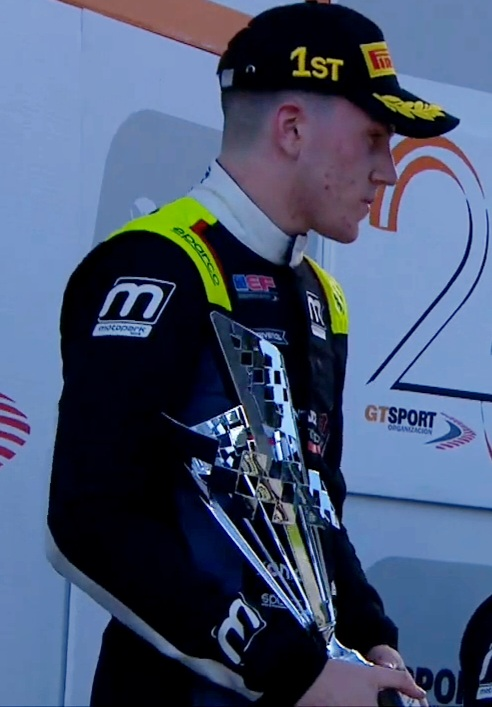
- Shields in 2023
- Born: 7 March 2005 (age 21); Glasgow, Scotland
- Nationality: (United Kingdom) British; (Republic of Ireland) Irish; via dual nationality

FIA Formula 2 Championship career
- Debut season: 2024
- Current team: AIX Racing
- Categorisation: FIA Silver
- Car number: 21
- Starts: 49
- Wins: 0
- Podiums: 0
- Poles: 0
- Fastest laps: 1
- Best finish: 24th in 2025

Previous series
- 2024; 2023; 2022: FIA Formula 3; Euroformula Open; GB3

Cian Shields (/ˈki.ən/ KEE-ən; born 7 March 2005) is a British racing driver who competes in the FIA Formula 2 Championship for AIX Racing, and in the Asian Le Mans Series for Inter Europol Competition. He was the 2023 Euroformula Open Championship runner-up and contested the 2024 FIA Formula 3 Championship with Hitech before his promotion to F2. Born and raised in Glasgow, Scotland, Shields is of Irish descent.

== Career ==
=== Karting ===
Shields started karting at the age of eleven in 2016. In 2017, he competed in IAME Cadets, coached by British GT driver Dean MacDonald, and became X30 Junior-category champion in the IAME Series Benelux two years later.

=== Lower formulae and prototype racing ===
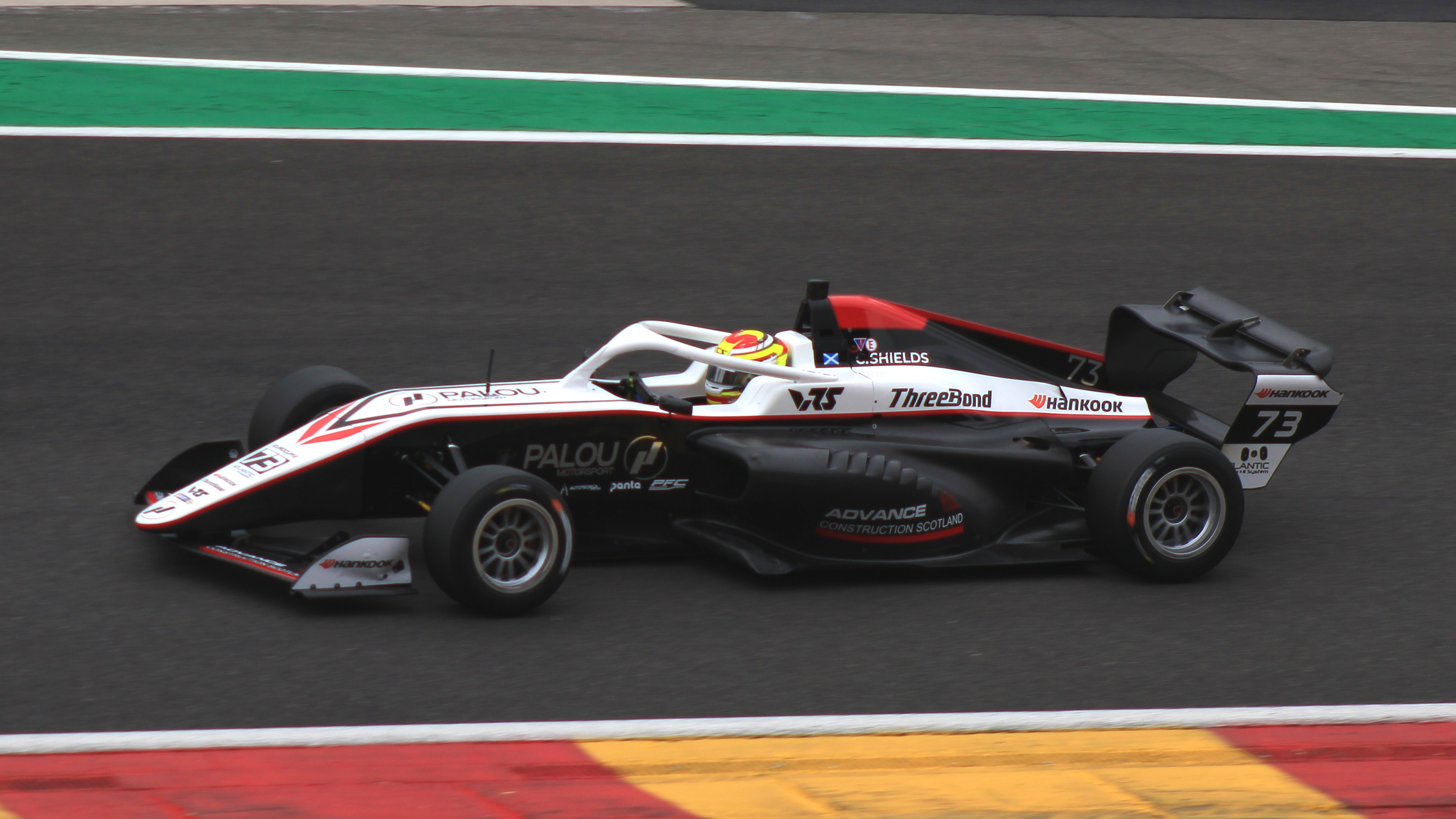
Shields driving at Spa-Francorchamps during the 2023 Eurocup-3 season

In 2022, Shields began his single-seater career by joining Hitech Grand Prix in the GB3 Championship. He would take his first victory in the reversed-grid race at Silverstone, holding off Nick Gilkes in the closing laps. Until the end of the season, which he ultimately finished in thirteenth, he would take two further podium finishes.

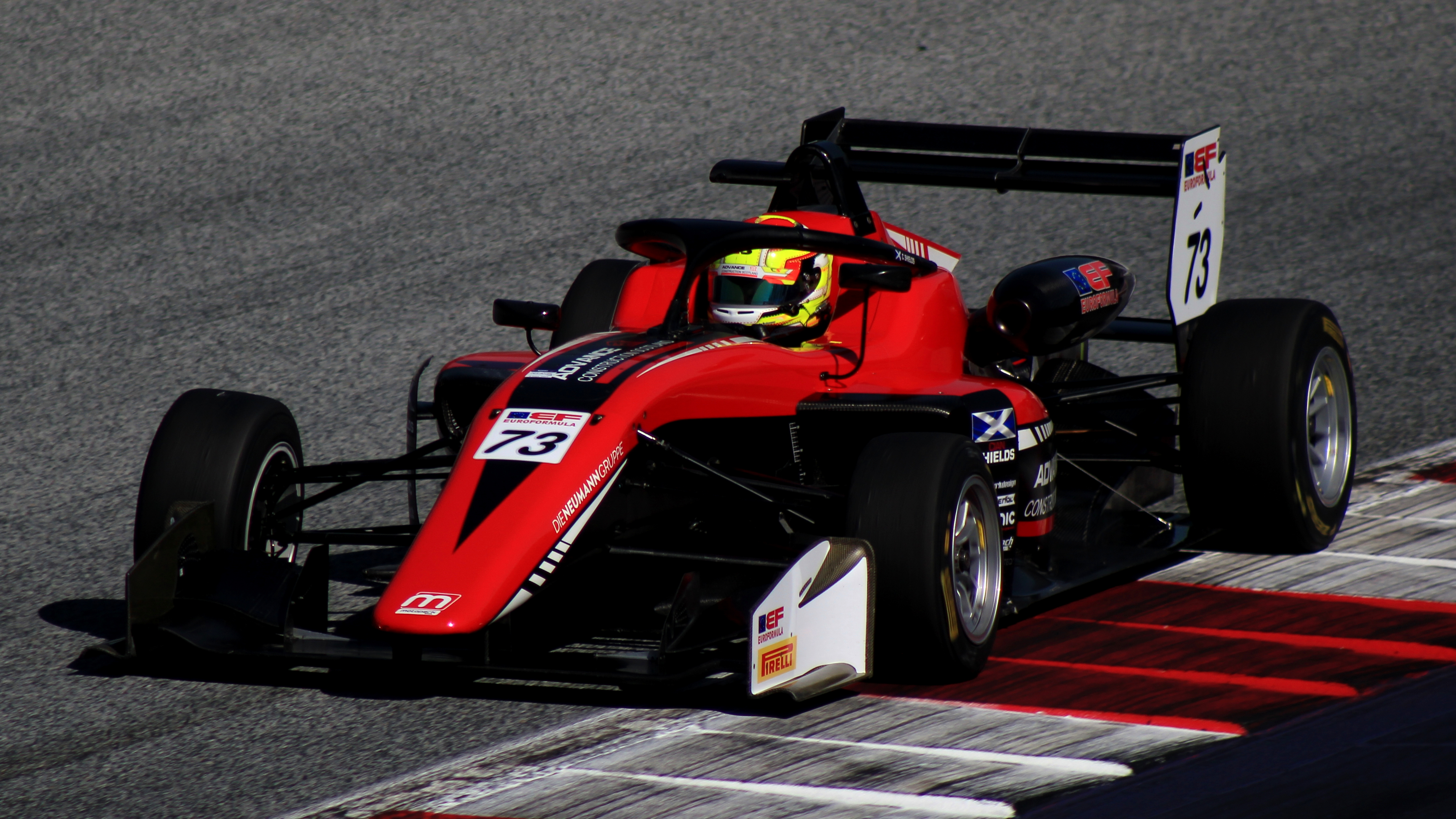
Shields at the Red Bull Ring during the 2023 Euroformula Open

Shields moved to the Euroformula Open Championship in 2023, driving for Team Motopark. Throughout the season, Shields took four wins at Spa-Francorchamps, Paul Ricard, Spielberg and Mugello, becoming the series runner-up. During the year, he also entered the opening round of the newly-formed Eurocup-3 series, but did not start any of the races, and drove for 360 Racing in the Prototype Challenge at Spa-Francorchamps in a Radical SR3; he won the first race in the Radical class.

=== FIA Formula 3 ===
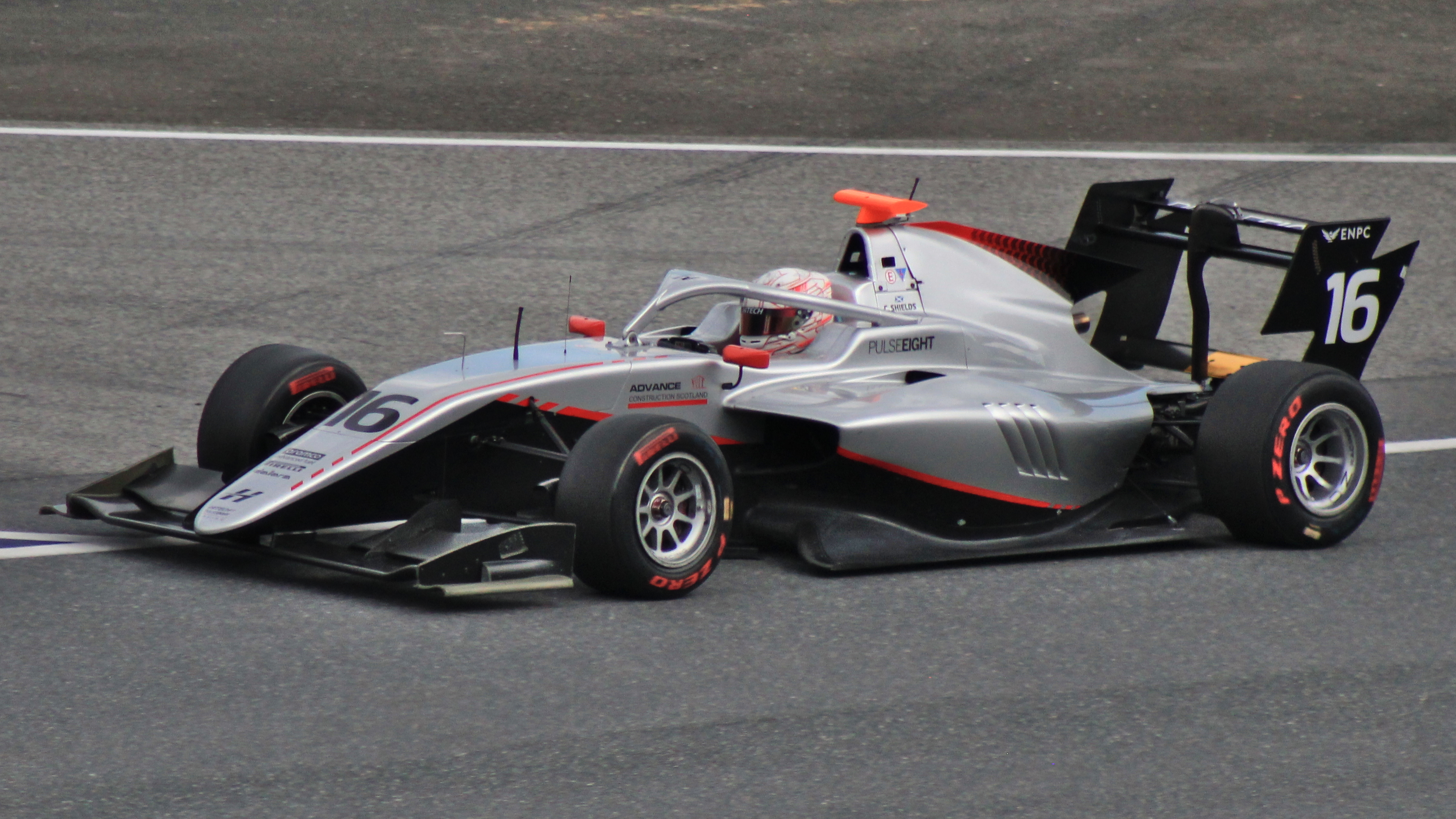
Shields driving the Dallara F3 2019 during the 2024 Spielberg Formula 3 round

In late 2023, Shields rejoined Hitech Pulse-Eight for post-season testing for the FIA Formula 3 Championship. Later that December, Shields was announced to be driving for Hitech during the 2024 FIA F3 season. The year proved to be a challenge, as Shields finished last of all full-time competitors and scored no points. His best result came during the Barcelona sprint race, where he finished 14th. At the end of the campaign, Hitech's team manager Tom Bellringer praised Shields for his progress throughout the season.

=== FIA Formula 2 ===
==== 2024 ====
Shields took part in the final two rounds of the 2024 Formula 2 season with AIX Racing, replacing Niels Koolen. He benefited from a pit stop under safety car conditions in the Qatar feature race to finish eleventh, though he also qualified last for both that round and the one at Abu Dhabi. Thereafter, he took part in the Abu Dhabi post-season test.

==== 2025 ====
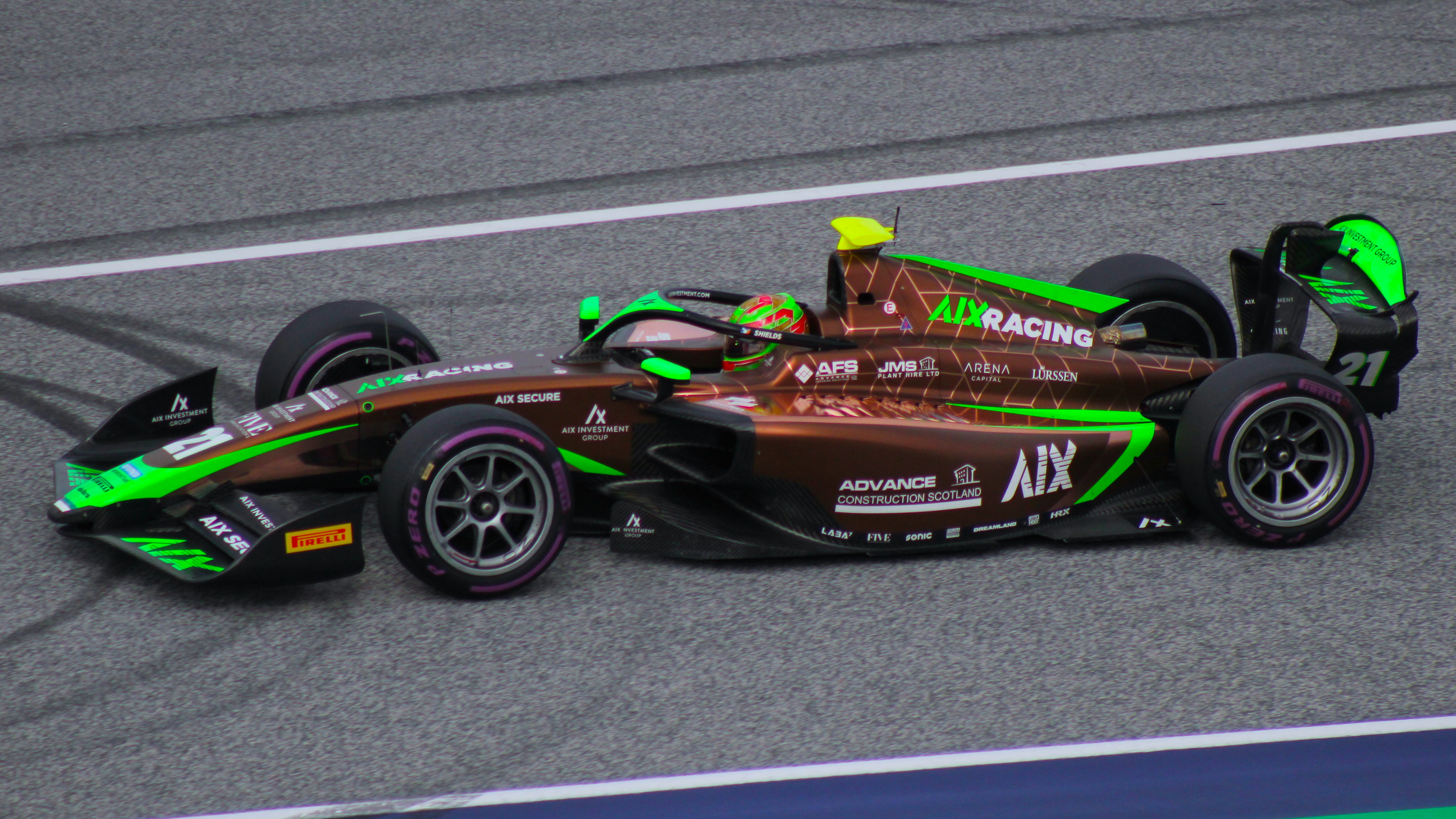
Shields driving the Dallara F2 2024 during the 2025 Spielberg Formula 2 round

Shields continued with AIX Racing for his first full Formula 2 campaign in 2025, partnering up with Joshua Dürksen.

==== 2026 ====
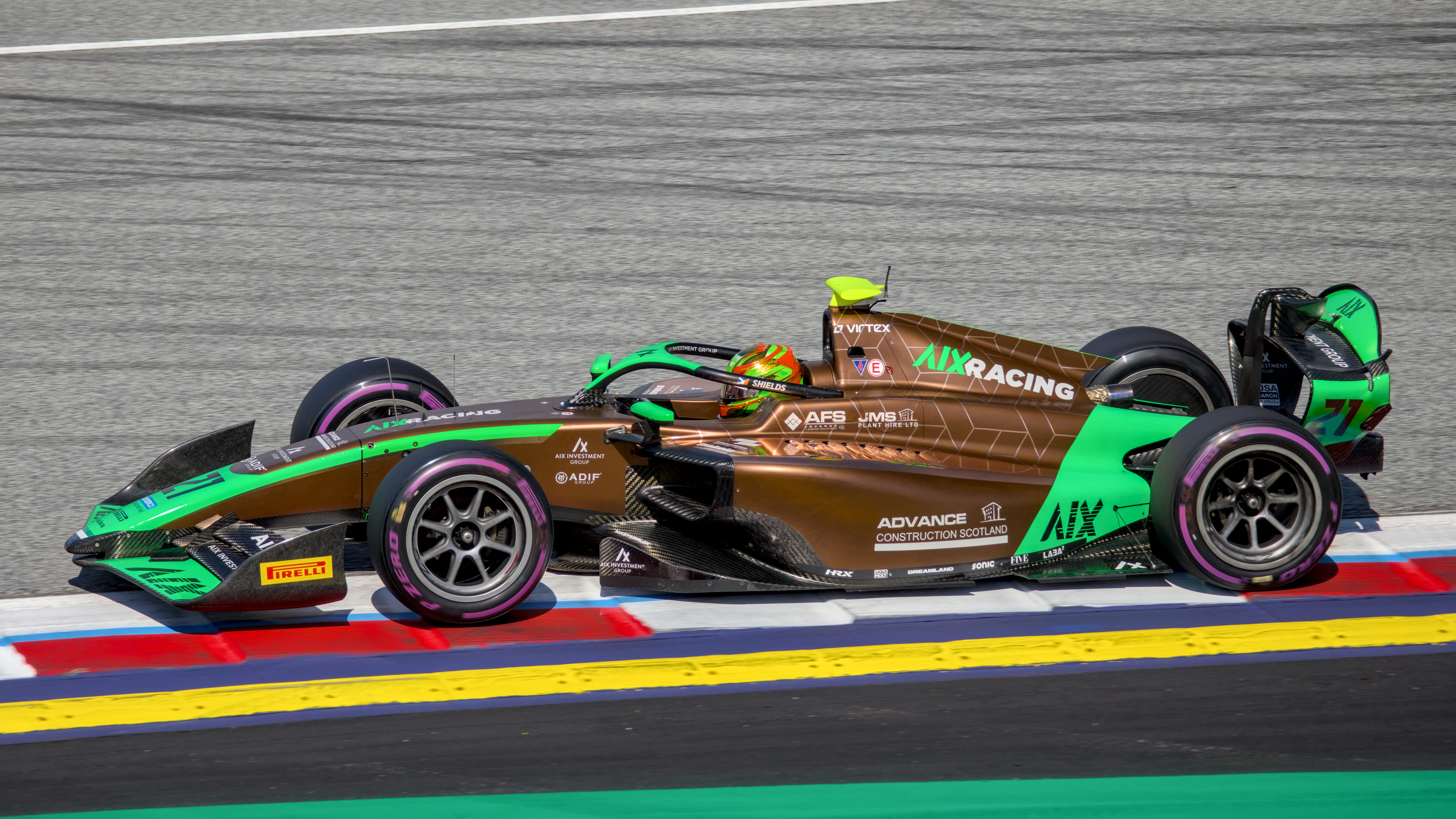
Shields driving for AIX Racing during the 2026 Spielberg Formula 2 round

Shields continued to drive for AIX Racing for his second Formula 2 season in 2026, where he will partner Emerson Fittipaldi Jr.

During the feature race in Montreal, Shields managed to finish in sixth place after a chaotic race, climbing eleven positions to score his first points in FIA Formula 2.

=== Formula One ===
In June 2025, Shields took part in a private Formula One test with Aston Martin in Monza, driving the Aston Martin AMR23. At the Abu Dhabi Grand Prix, he took part in his first Friday free practice session (FP1), replacing Fernando Alonso, and placed last in the timesheets.

=== Formula E ===
In March 2026, Shields took part in the Formula E Madrid rookie test with Cupra Kiro.

=== Endurance racing ===
In November 2026, Shields will compete in the off-season Asian Le Mans Series with Inter Europol Competition.

== Karting record ==
=== Karting career summary ===
Season	Series	Team	Position
2016	LGM Series - IAME Cadet		33rd
2018	Kartmasters British Grand Prix- X30 Mini	Fusion Motorsport	7th
2018	IAME Winter Cup - X30 Junior	Strawberry Racing	3rd
2019	IAME Series Benelux - X30 Junior		1st
2019	IAME International Final - X30 Junior		9th
2019	British Kart Championship - X30 Junior	Fusion Motorsport	41st
2019	IAME Euro Series - X30 Junior	Fusion Motorsport	21st
2019	IAME Winter Cup - X30 Junior	Fusion Motorsport	22nd
2020	Rotax Max Challenge International Trophy - Senior Max		7th
2020	Rotax Max Euro Winter Cup - Senior	Strawberry Racing	14th
2020	IAME Winter Cup - X30 Senior	Strawberry Racing	19th
2021	IAME Winter Cup - X30 Senior	KR Racing	10th
2021	IAME Euro Series - X30 Senior		13th

== Racing record ==
=== Racing career summary ===
Season	Series	Team	Races	Wins	Poles	F/Laps	Podiums	Points	Position
2022	GB3 Championship	Hitech Grand Prix	24	1	0	0	3	186.5	13th
2022	Prototype Challenge - Radical	360 Racing	2	1	0	0	1	0†	NC†
2023	Euroformula Open Championship	Team Motopark	23	4	0	3	10	307	**2nd**
2024	FIA Formula 3 Championship	Hitech Pulse-Eight	20	0	0	0	0	0	30th
2024	FIA Formula 2 Championship	AIX Racing	4	0	0	0	0	0	30th
2025	FIA Formula 2 Championship	AIX Racing	27	0	0	0	0	0	24th
2025	Formula One	Aston Martin Aramco F1 Team	Test driver						
2026	FIA Formula 2 Championship	AIX Racing	8	0	0	0	0	10	19th*
2026–27	Asian Le Mans Series - LMP2	Inter Europol Competition	2	0	0	0	1	15*	6th*

^{†} As Shields was a guest driver, he was ineligible to score points.
* Season still in progress.

=== Complete GB3 Championship results ===
(key) (Races in bold indicate pole position) (Races in italics indicate fastest lap)

Year	Team	1	2	3	4	5	6	7	8	9	10	11	12	13	14	15	16	17	18	19	20	21	22	23	24	DC	Points
2022	Hitech Grand Prix	OUL; 1; 11	OUL; 2 Ret	OUL; 3; 7	SIL1; 1; 16	SIL1; 2; 18	SIL1; 3; 1^{1}	DON1; 1; 14	DON1; 2; 15	DON1; 3; 19	SNE; 1; 14	SNE; 2; 19	SNE; 3 Ret	SPA; 1; 7	SPA; 2; 9	SPA; 3; 13^{6}	SIL2; 1; 17	SIL2; 2; 15	SIL2; 3; 15^{7}	BRH; 1; 21	BRH; 2; 19	BRH; 3; 2	DON2; 1; 12	DON2; 2; 5	DON2; 3; 2^{1}	13th	186.5

=== Complete Euroformula Open Championship results ===
(key) (Races in bold indicate pole position) (Races in italics indicate fastest lap)

Year	Team	1	2	3	4	5	6	7	8	9	10	11	12	13	14	15	16	17	18	19	20	21	22	23	Pos	Points
2023	Team Motopark	EST; 1; 6	EST; 2; 9	EST; 3; 5	SPA; 1; 2	SPA; 2; 4	SPA; 3; 1*	HUN; 1; 2	HUN; 2; 8	HUN; 3; 6	LEC; 1; 4	LEC; 2; 2	LEC; 3; 1	RBR; 1; 2	RBR; 2; 5	RBR; 3; 1	MNZ; 1; 6	MNZ; 2; 4†	MNZ; 3 Ret	MUG; 1; 4	MUG; 2; 1	CAT; 1; 3	CAT; 2; 3	CAT; 3; 6	2nd	307

=== Complete FIA Formula 3 Championship results ===
(key) (Races in bold indicate pole position) (Races in italics indicate fastest lap)

Year	Entrant	1	2	3	4	5	6	7	8	9	10	11	12	13	14	15	16	17	18	19	20	DC	Points
2024	Hitech Pulse-Eight	BHR; SPR; 26	BHR; FEA; 26	MEL; SPR; 25	MEL; FEA; 20	IMO; SPR; 19	IMO; FEA; 18	MON; SPR; Ret	MON; FEA; 21	CAT; SPR; 14	CAT; FEA; 20	RBR; SPR; 16	RBR; FEA; 21	SIL; SPR; 17	SIL; FEA; Ret	HUN; SPR; 21	HUN; FEA; 17	SPA; SPR; 22	SPA; FEA; 22	MNZ; SPR; 20	MNZ; FEA; Ret	30th	0

=== Complete FIA Formula 2 Championship results ===
(key) (Races in bold indicate pole position) (Races in italics indicate fastest lap)

Year	Entrant	1	2	3	4	5	6	7	8	9	10	11	12	13	14	15	16	17	18	19	20	21	22	23	24	25	26	27	28	29	DC	Points
2024	AIX Racing	BHR; SPR	BHR; FEA	JED; SPR	JED; FEA	MEL; SPR	MEL; FEA	IMO; SPR	IMO; FEA	MON; SPR	MON; FEA	CAT; SPR	CAT; FEA	RBR; SPR	RBR; FEA	SIL; SPR	SIL; FEA	HUN; SPR	HUN; FEA	SPA; SPR	SPA; FEA	MNZ; SPR	MNZ; FEA	BAK; SPR	BAK; FEA	LSL; SPR; 18	LSL; FEA; 11	YMC; SPR; 18	YMC; FEA; 18		30th	0
2025	AIX Racing	MEL; SPR; 17	MEL; FEA; C	BHR; SPR; 18	BHR; FEA; 22	JED; SPR; Ret	JED; FEA; 19	IMO; SPR; 18	IMO; FEA; 11	MON; SPR; Ret	MON; FEA; 13	CAT; SPR; 12	CAT; FEA; 19	RBR; SPR; 12	RBR; FEA; Ret	SIL; SPR; 17	SIL; FEA; 14	SPA; SPR; 13	SPA; FEA; 19	HUN; SPR; 21	HUN; FEA; 16	MNZ; SPR; 15	MNZ; FEA; Ret	BAK; SPR; 14	BAK; FEA; 18	LSL; SPR; Ret	LSL; FEA; 20	YMC; SPR; 19	YMC; FEA; Ret		24th	0
2026	AIX Racing	MEL; SPR; 19	MEL; FEA; 19	MIA; SPR; 18	MIA; FEA; Ret	MTL; SPR; Ret	MTL; FEA; 5	MON; SPR; 18	MON; FEA; 17	CAT; SPR; 22	CAT; FEA; 20	RBR; SPR; 16	RBR; FEA; 17	SIL; SPR; 19	SIL; FEA; 19	SPA; SPR; Ret	SPA; FEA; 12	HUN; SPR; 16	HUN; FEA; 20	MNZ; SPR; 18	MNZ; FEA; 16	MAD; SPR; 16	MAD; FEA; 17	BAK; SPR; 12	BAK; FEA1; Ret	BAK; FEA2; 18	LSL; SPR	LSL; FEA	YMC; SPR	YMC; FEA	22nd*	10*

* Season still in progress.

=== Complete Formula One participations ===
(key) (Races in bold indicate pole position) (Races in italics indicate fastest lap)

Year	Entrant	Chassis	Engine	1	2	3	4	5	6	7	8	9	10	11	12	13	14	15	16	17	18	19	20	21	22	23	24	WDC	Points
2025	Aston Martin Aramco F1 Team	Aston Martin AMR25	Mercedes AMG F1 M16 E Performance V6 t	AUS	CHN	JPN	BHR	SAU	MIA	EMI	MON	ESP	CAN	AUT	GBR	BEL	HUN	NED	ITA	AZE	SIN	USA	MXC	SAP	LVG	QAT	ABU; TD	–	–

=== Complete Asian Le Mans Series results ===
(key) (Races in bold indicate pole position; results in italics indicate fastest lap)

Year	Entrant	Class	Chassis	Engine	1	2	3	4	5	6	Rank	Points
2026–27	Inter Europol Competition	LMP2	Oreca 07	Gibson GK428 4.2 L V8	LEC; 1; 3	LEC; 2; 14	JER; 1	JER; 2	POR; 1	POR; 2	6th*	15*

* Season still in progess.
