= Christian Mansell =

Australian racing driver (born 2005)

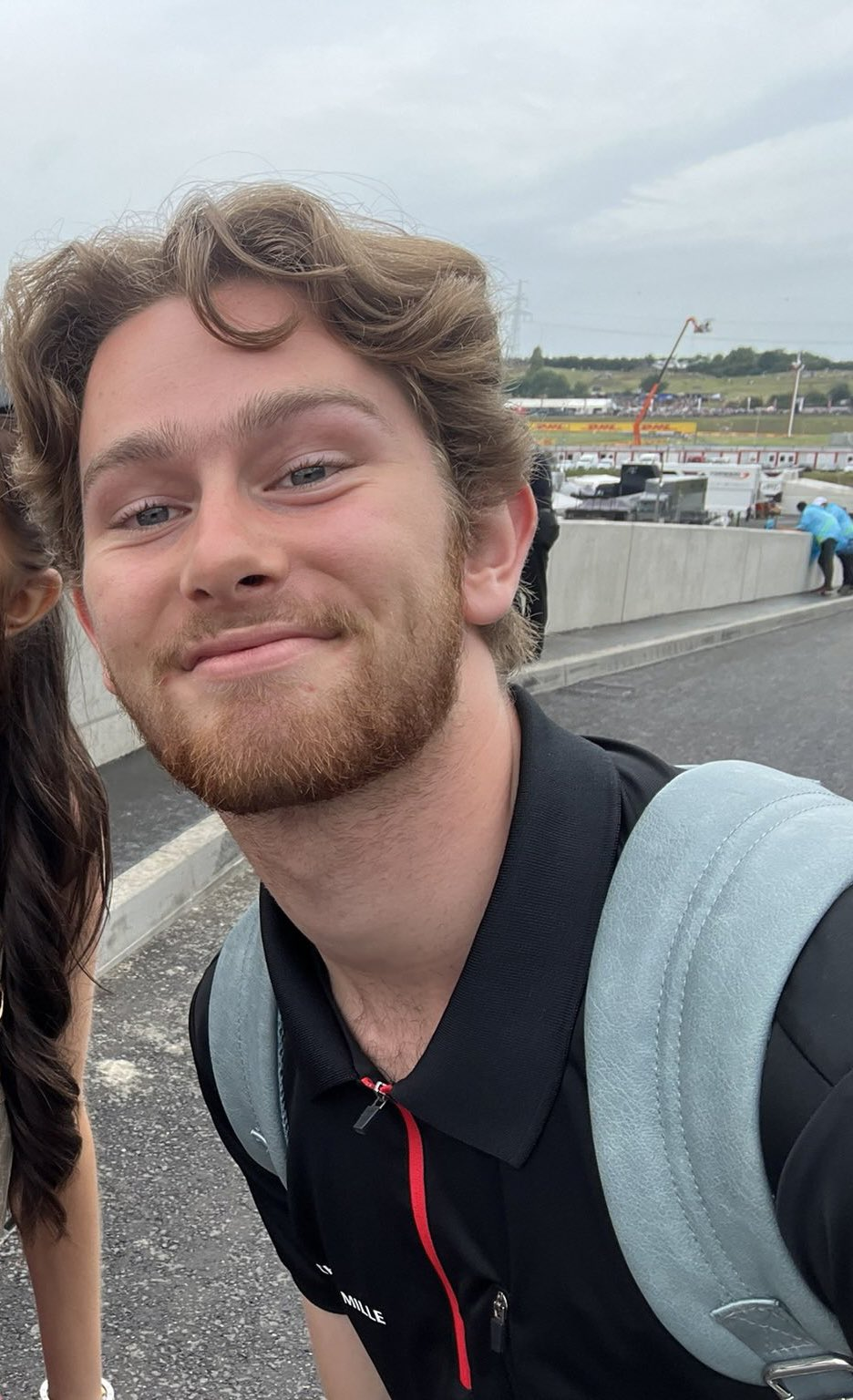
- Mansell in 2024
- Nationality: (Australia) Australian
- Born: 9 February 2005 (age 21) Maitland, New South Wales, Australia

FIA Formula 2 Championship career
- Debut season: 2024
- Categorisation: FIA Silver
- Car number: 16
- Former teams: Trident
- Starts: 6 (6 entries)
- Wins: 0
- Podiums: 0
- Poles: 0
- Fastest laps: 0
- Best finish: 25th in 2024

Previous series
- 2024; 2022–2024; 2021–2022; 2021; 2020; 2019: FR Oceania; FIA Formula 3; Euroformula Open; BRDC British F3; F4 British; F4 Australian

Christian Mansell (born 9 February 2005) is an Australian racing driver competing in the International GT Open for Team Motopark.

An open-wheel racing product, Mansell placed third in GB3 and Euroformula Open before competing in FIA Formula 3 from 2022 to 2024, when he finished fifth for ART Grand Prix. He was scheduled to step up to Formula 2 for Rodin Motorsport in 2025, but withdrew due to personal reasons.

== Career ==
=== Karting ===
Mansell's highest karting career finish in the CIK-FIA Karting European Championship came in 2019, where he achieved 69th in the OKJ category.

=== Lower formulae ===
==== 2019 ====
In 2019, Mansell made his single-seater debut in the New South Wales Formula Race Car Championship. He also raced in two rounds of the Australian Formula 4 Championship with AGI Sport and finished all but one race in the top seven. As Mansell was a guest driver, he was not classified in the standings.

==== 2020 ====
For 2020, Mansell moved over to the United Kingdom to race full-time in the F4 British Championship, partnering Zak O'Sullivan and Matías Zagazeta at Carlin. Whilst the Australian only managed to score one win at the Brands Hatch Circuit, in contrast to O'Sullivan's nine over the course of the season, he did score four more podiums, which included two third places and a second place at the final round, finishing seventh in the championship. Mansell won the season's Rookie Cup with a 61.5 point gap to Frederick Lubin.

=== GB3 Championship ===
Mansell stayed on with Carlin in 2021, progressing to the renamed GB3 Championship. He took his first win of the season in the reversed grid race at the opening round in Brands Hatch, overtaking six cars over the course of the race. His next win came at the Circuit de Spa-Francorchamps. Mansell scored a further three podiums to finish third in the standings.

=== Euroformula Open ===
==== 2021 ====
In 2021, Mansell made his Euroformula Open Championship debut at the Circuit de Spa-Francorchamps, with Carlin finishing all his races in the top six. Mansell returned to Euroformula but with Team Motopark during the penultimate round at Monza, finishing third in the first race. He was retained for the Barcelona stage, where he achieved two more points finishes to complete the season 11th overall.

==== 2022 ====
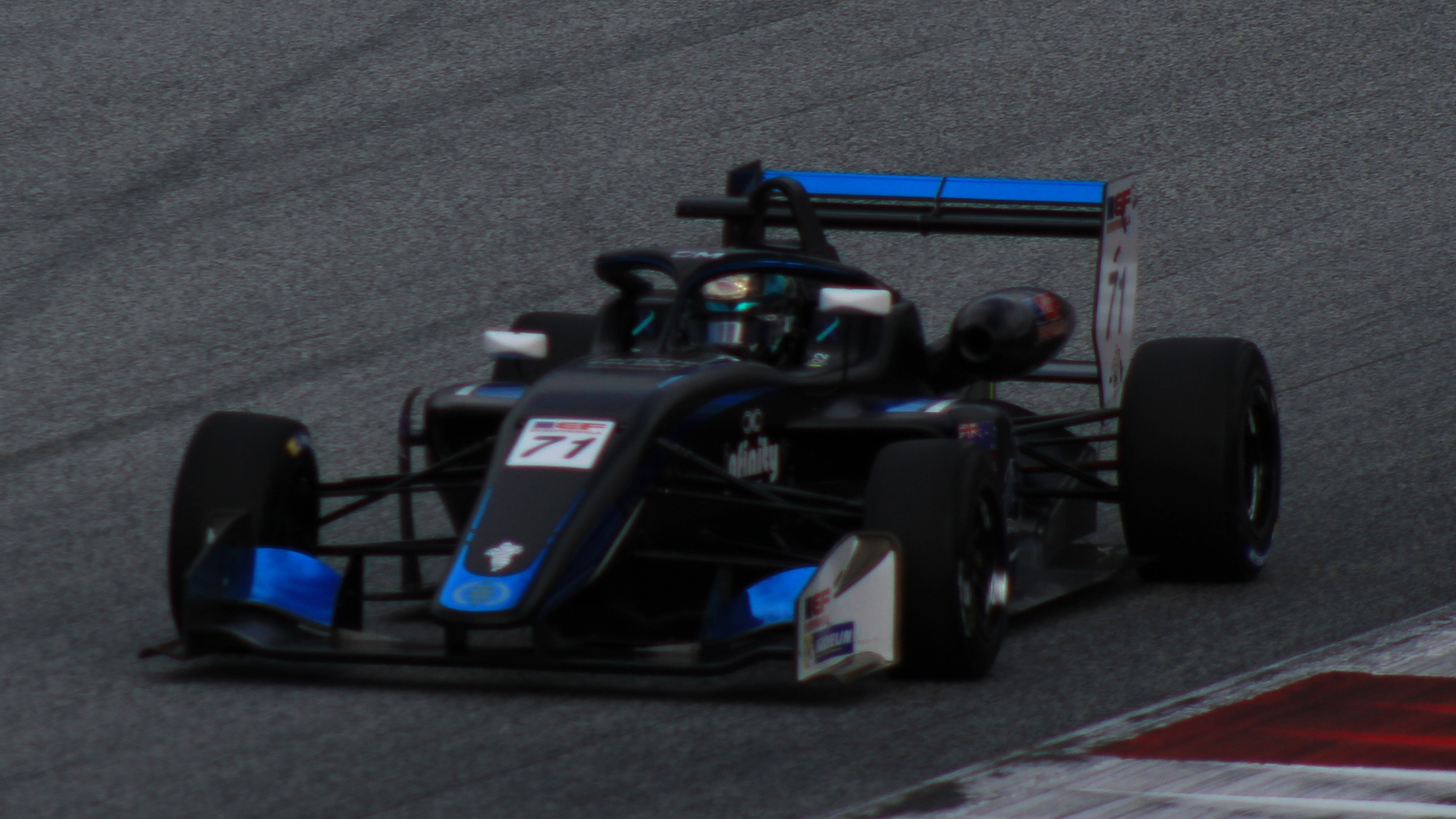
Mansell racing in the 2022 Euroformula Open at the Red Bull Ring

Mansell remained in the series for the 2022 season, partnering Vladislav Lomko and Josh Mason at CryptoTower Racing. He took the opening victory of the season at the Estoril Circuit, and claimed two second places at the next round in Pau, which included his only pole of the year, before a run of four straight podium finishes including a win. His third win came at Hungaroring in the final race. Four more podiums in the next two rounds came, before a double retirement in the penultimate Monza round. The first retirement was a serious crash with Francesco Simonazzi where he was launched skywards. He claimed a podium in the final round and finished third in the standings, having taken fifteen podiums.

=== FIA Formula 3 ===
==== 2022 ====
Mansell made his debut F3 appearance in the 2022 FIA Formula 3 Championship, at the Hungaroring with Charouz Racing System, replacing Zdeněk Chovanec. Mansell returned to his main campaign at the Euroformula Open before the Zandvoort round and was replaced by David Schumacher. Mansell was ranked 38th in the final standings. At the end of September, Mansell participated in the post-season test with Campos Racing.

==== 2023 ====
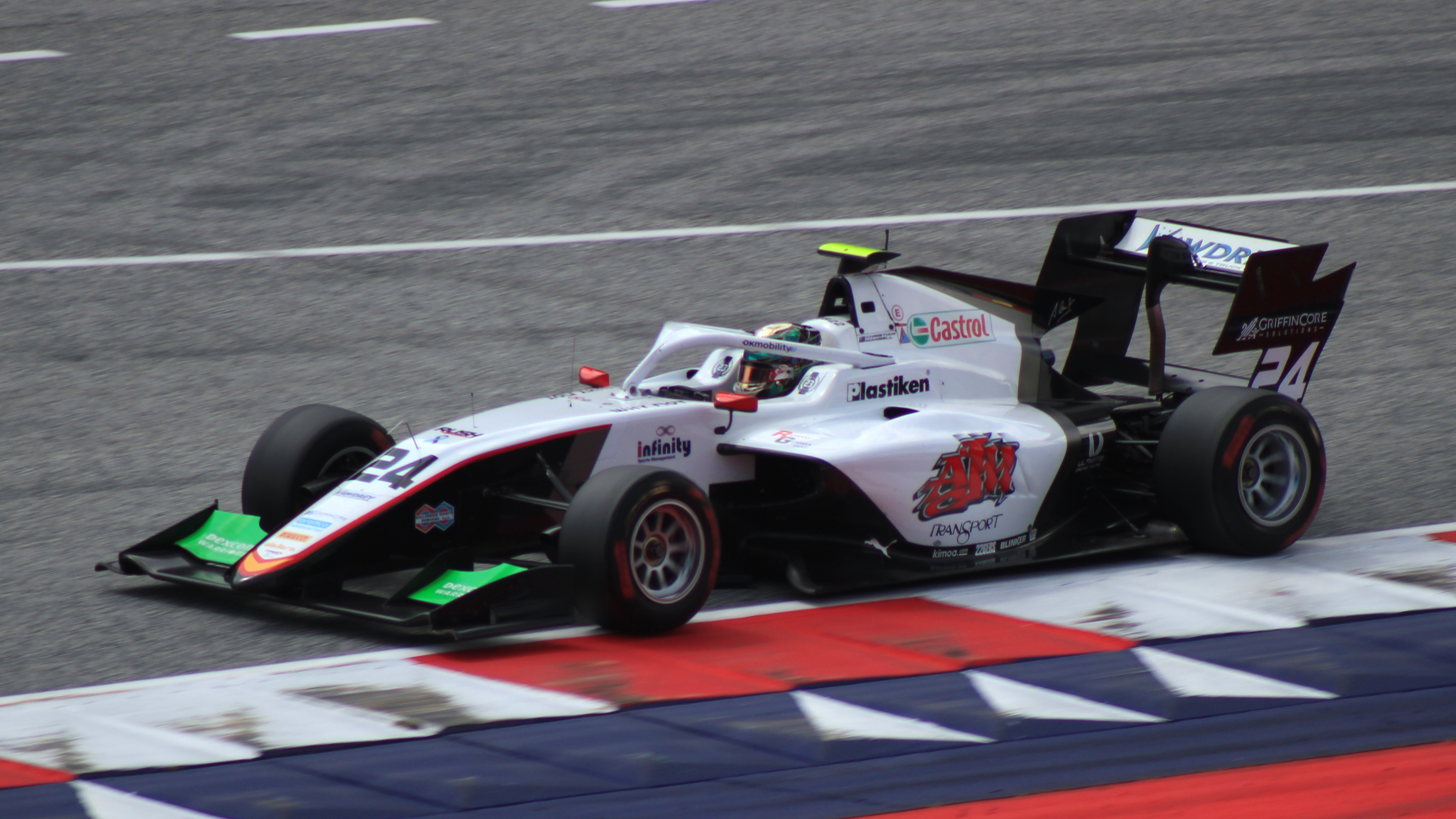
Mansell driving the Dallara F3 2019 during the 2023 Spielberg Formula 3 round

On 28 November, Mansell was announced as a full-time driver with Campos Racing for the 2023 F3 season. He then stated that he was "hungry to maximize his and Campos Racing's full potential" after his cameo appearance in 2022. In Bahrain, he finished both races in 13th. In Melbourne he scored his first points in ninth place after three drivers ahead were disqualified post-sprint race. The following day, he finished in tenth following another post-race penalty for a rival. Mansell failed to score points in Monaco, and was spun out by Gabriele Minì in the Barcelona sprint race. He returned to the points in the feature race with tenth place. The following weekend in Austria, Mansell finished seventh in the feature race.

Silverstone delivered a breakthrough for the Australian, qualifying in fourth. After choosing to stay on dry tyres, Mansell climbed from seventh to third during the last lap, holding off a late charge from Caio Collet to achieve his maiden Formula 3 podium. He followed this with a fifth-placed finish in the feature race. In Budapest he finished sixth in the sprint and 11th in the feature. At Spa-Francorchamps he qualifying 23rd for the sprint race. In the feature race, a gamble on wet tyres saw him finish second. Mansell ended his season in Monza by scoring seventh and eighth places. Mansell finished 12th in the standings with 60 points and two podium finishes.

In October 2023, Mansell joined ART Grand Prix for post-season testing at Jerez. He then participated in the Macau Grand Prix with the French team, finishing 16th in the main race.

At the Formula 3 end of season awards night, Mansell picked up the Best Comeback of the Year for his performance in the feature race in Belgium where he progressed from 23rd to second at the chequered flag.

==== 2024 ====
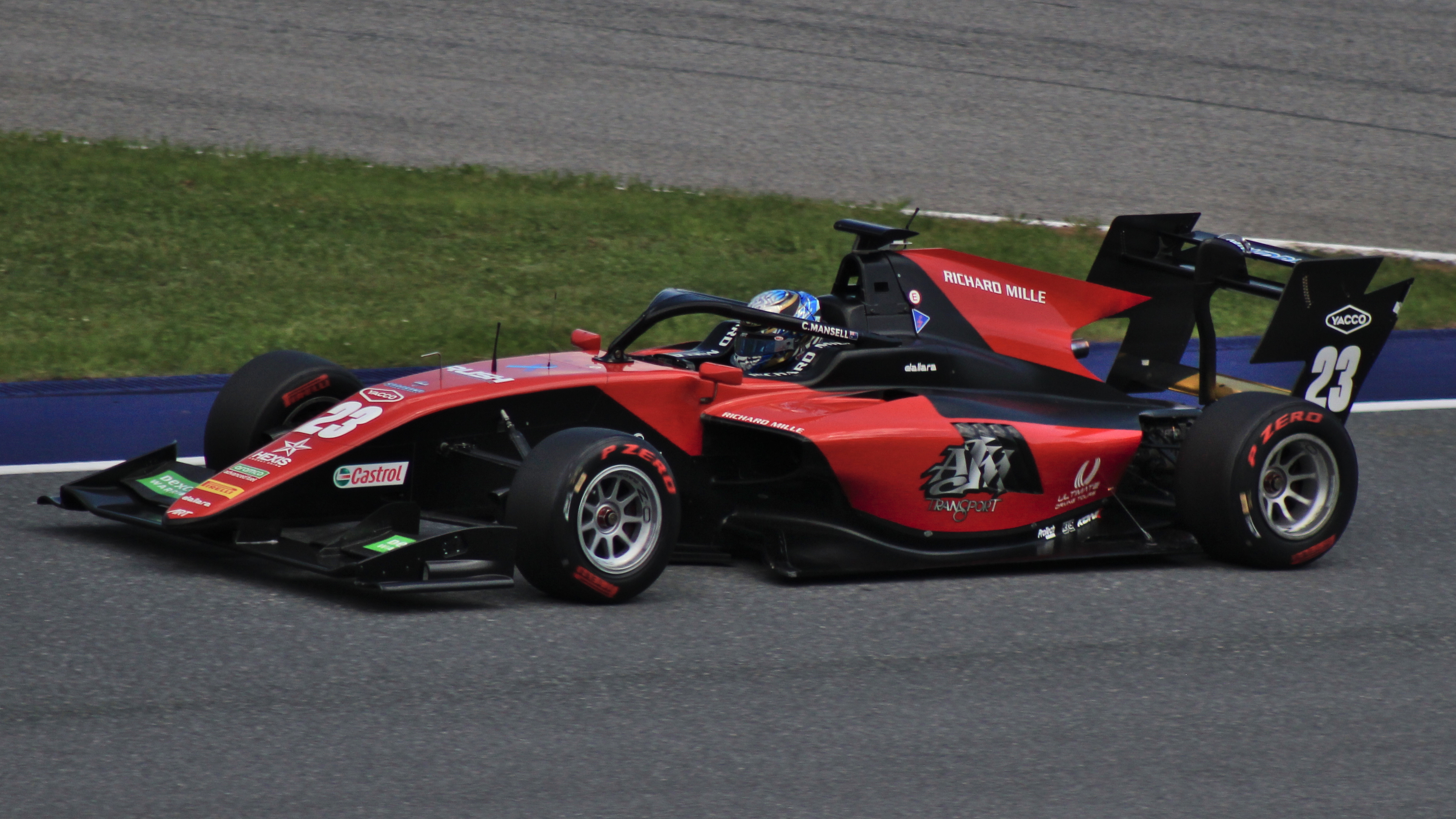
Mansell driving for ART Grand Prix during the 2024 Spielberg Formula 3 round

Mansell moved to ART Grand Prix for his second full Formula 3 season. Qualifying eighth for the Bahrain opening round, before finishing out of the points. He finished second in the feature race. Mansell took two tenth places in his home event in Melbourne. He failed to score points in Imola, but bounced to qualify second in Monaco. He was eliminated in a first lap incident after Arvid Lindblad swiped across him in the sprint race, but he returned to the podium with another second place in the feature.

Mansell took his first F3 pole in Barcelona. Missing out on points in the sprint race, he led the feature until lap 5 where Arvid Lindblad overtook him, leading Mansell to finish second. Mansell tussled for the lead in Austria with teammate Nikola Tsolov, finishing in third place. In the feature race, he finished fourth. This was followed by a point-less weekend in Silverstone

In Hungary, Mansell qualified eighth, and secured fifth and fourth place, hauling him into title contention. However, a messy Spa-Francorchamps round followed, as he qualified down in 20th and was unable to score points in both races, even being penalised in the feature for taking Arvid Lindblad out. Qualifying seventh for the season finale in Monza, he finished 22nd in the sprint race . He finished the feature race on the podium.

Mansell finished fifth in the championship with 112 points, one pole and five podiums, as well as helping ART Grand Prix finish third in the championship.

=== Formula Regional ===
Mansell participated in the first two rounds of the 2024 Formula Regional Oceania Championship with Giles Motorsport, in preparation for his main campaign in Formula 3. He secured four podiums in six races including a sole win in Manfeild and won the Tasman Cup.

=== FIA Formula 2 ===
==== 2024 ====
Shortly after the F3 season finale, Mansell made his Formula 2 debut with Trident from the Baku round onwards, replacing Roman Staněk. He finished eighth after leading the early stages and making late contact with Gabriel Bortoleto in a battle for fifth place, before finishing 10th in the feature race. Mansell qualified in 20th in Qatar, but a well-timed pit stop during the feature race allowed him to gain time on rivals ahead and he eventually finished in sixth place. The Yas Marina round left him scoreless with a double 16th place. Mansell scored ten points throughout his three-round stint and finished 25th in the standings.

==== 2025 ====
In November 2024, Mansell signed with Rodin Motorsport to race in the 2025 FIA Formula 2 Championship. However, on 4 March 2025, Mansell posted on his social media that he would be "stepping away from racing for a little while" citing personal reasons, therefore withdrawing from the championship.

== Personal life ==
Mansell has ADHD and type 1 diabetes. He grew up in Bolwarra in the New South Wales Hunter Valley, yet currently lives in London, and is not related to 1992 Formula One World Champion Nigel Mansell.

== Karting record ==
=== Karting career summary ===
Season	Series	Team	Position
2018	South Garda Winter Cup — OKJ		52nd
2018	CIK-FIA European Championship — OKJ	Lennox Racing Team	72nd
2018	CIK-FIA World Championship — OKJ	Lennox Racing Team	70th
2018	WSK Final Cup — OKJ	Lennox Racing Team	84th
2018	Australian Kart Championship — KA4 Junior		18th
2019	Australian Kart Championship — KA2		12th
2019	WSK Super Master Series — OKJ	Lennox Racing Team	105th
2019	CIK-FIA Karting European Championship — OKJ	Lennox Racing Team	69th
2019	WSK Euro Series — OKJ	Lennox Racing Team	80th

== Racing record ==
=== Racing career summary ===
Season	Series	Team	Races	Wins	Poles	F/Laps	Podiums	Points	Position
2019	Australian Formula 4 Championship	AGI Sport	6	0	0	0	0	0	NC†
2019	New South Wales Formula Race Car Championship	AGI Sport	3	0	0	0	0	0	NC†
2020	F4 British Championship	Carlin	26	1	0	0	5	163	7th
2021	GB3 Championship	Carlin	24	2	0	1	5	371	**3rd**
2021	Euroformula Open Championship	Carlin Motorsport	3	0	0	0	0	79	11th
2021	Euroformula Open Championship	Team Motopark	6	0	0	0	1	79	11th
2022	Euroformula Open Championship	CryptoTower Racing	26	3	1	3	15	377	**3rd**
2022	FIA Formula 3 Championship	Charouz Racing System	4	0	0	0	0	0	38th
2023	FIA Formula 3 Championship	Campos Racing	18	0	0	1	2	60	12th
2023	Macau Grand Prix	ART Grand Prix	1	0	0	0	0	N/A	16th
2024	Formula Regional Oceania Championship	Giles Motorsport	6	1	2	1	4	135	9th
2024	Tasman Series	Giles Motorsport	6	1	2	1	4	135	**1st**
2024	FIA Formula 3 Championship	ART Grand Prix	20	0	1	1	5	112	5th
2024	FIA Formula 2 Championship	Trident	6	0	0	0	0	10	25th
2025-26	24H Series Middle East - GT3	Capital RT by Motopark	2	0	0	0	0	-	NA
2026	International GT Open	Team Motopark	14	2	3	1	7	117	5th
2026	GT World Challenge Europe Endurance Cup	Team Motopark	2	0	0	0	0	0	NC
2026	GT World Challenge Europe Endurance Cup - Silver	Team Motopark	2	0	0	0	0	9	28th
2026	Nürburgring Langstrecken-Serie - BMW M240i	Team Motopark	2	0	0	0	0	-	NA
2026-27	Asian Le Mans Series - GT3	2 Seas Motorsport							

^{†} As Mansell was a guest driver, he was ineligible for points.
* Season still in progress.

=== Complete Australian Formula 4 Championship results ===
(key) (Races in bold indicate pole position) (Races in italics indicate fastest lap)

Year	Team	1	2	3	4	5	6	7	8	9	10	11	12	13	14	15	16	17	18	DC	Points
2019	AGI Sport	MEL; 1	MEL; 2	MEL; 3	SYD; 1	SYD; 2	SYD; 3	PHI1; 1; 5	PHI1; 2; 6	PHI1; 3; 6	PHI2; 1 Ret	PHI2; 2; 4	PHI2; 3; 7	BEN1; 1	BEN1; 2	BEN1; 3	BEN2; 1	BEN2; 2	BEN2; 2	NC†	0

^{†} As Mansell was a guest driver, he was ineligible for points.

=== Complete F4 British Championship results ===
(key) (Races in bold indicate pole position) (Races in italics indicate fastest lap)

Year	Team	1	2	3	4	5	6	7	8	9	10	11	12	13	14	15	16	17	18	19	20	21	22	23	24	25	26	DC	Points
2020	Carlin	DON; 1; 12	DON; 2; 5	DON; 3; 7	BHGP; 1; 6	BHGP; 2; 1	BHGP; 3; 7	OUL; 1; 8	OUL; 2; 12	OUL; 3; 8	KNO; 1; 9	KNO; 2; 6	KNO; 3 Ret	THR; 1; 10	THR; 2; 7	THR; 3; 7	SIL; 1 Ret	SIL; 2; 7	SIL; 3; 6	CRO; 1; 10	CRO; 2; 6	SNE; 1; 3	SNE; 2; 8	SNE; 3; 9	BHI; 1; 3	BHI; 2; 3	BHI; 3; 2‡	7th	163

‡ Half points were awarded for Race 3, as less than 75% of the scheduled distance was completed.

=== Complete BRDC British Formula 3 Championship results ===
(key) (Races in bold indicate pole position) (Races in italics indicate fastest lap)

Year	Team	1	2	3	4	5	6	7	8	9	10	11	12	13	14	15	16	17	18	19	20	21	22	23	24	DC	Points
2021	Carlin	BRH; 1; 8	BRH; 2; 10	BRH; 3; 1^{6}	SIL1; 1; 8	SIL1; 2; 7	SIL1; 3; 11	DON1; 1; 5	DON1; 2; 6	DON1; 3; 6^{4}	SPA; 1; 1	SPA; 2; 3	SPA; 3; 5^{8}	SNE; 1; 7	SNE; 2; 11	SNE; 3; 10^{5}	SIL2; 1; 4	SIL2; 2; 9	SIL2; 3; 8^{2}	OUL; 1; 5	OUL; 2; 3	OUL; 3; 11	DON2; 1; 13	DON2; 2; 3	DON2; 3; 16	3rd	371

=== Complete Euroformula Open Championship results ===
(key) (Races in bold indicate pole position; races in italics indicate points for the fastest lap of top ten finishers)

Year	Entrant	1	2	3	4	5	6	7	8	9	10	11	12	13	14	15	16	17	18	19	20	21	22	23	24	25	26	DC	Points
2021	Carlin Motorsport	POR; 1	POR; 2	POR; 3	LEC; 1	LEC; 2	LEC; 3	SPA; 1; 5	SPA; 2; 4	SPA; 3; 6	HUN; 1	HUN; 2	HUN; 3	IMO; 1	IMO; 2	IMO; 3	RBR; 1	RBR; 2	RBR; 3									11th	79
2021	Team Motopark																			MNZ; 1; 2	MNZ; 2; 6	MNZ; 3; 4	CAT; 1; 10	CAT; 2; 16	CAT; 3; 5			11th	79
2022	CryptoTower Racing	POR; 1; 1	POR; 2; 8	POR; 3; 3	PAU; 1; 2	PAU; 2; 2	**LEC**; **1**; 4	LEC; 2; 1	LEC; 3; 2	SPA; 1; 2	SPA; 2; 2	SPA; 3; 4	HUN; 1; 4	HUN; 2; 2	HUN; 3; 1	IMO; 1; 3	IMO; 2; 5	IMO; 3; 2*	RBR; 1; 2*	RBR; 2; 5	RBR; 3; 4	MNZ; 1; 3	MNZ; 2 Ret	MNZ; 3 Ret	CAT; 1; 3	CAT; 2; 4	CAT; 3; 4	3rd	377

=== Complete FIA Formula 3 Championship results ===
(key) (Races in bold indicate pole position; races in italics indicate points for the fastest lap of top ten finishers)

Year	Entrant	1	2	3	4	5	6	7	8	9	10	11	12	13	14	15	16	17	18	19	20	DC	Points
2022	Charouz Racing System	BHR; SPR	BHR; FEA	IMO; SPR	IMO; FEA	CAT; SPR	CAT; FEA	SIL; SPR	SIL; FEA	RBR; SPR	RBR; FEA	HUN; SPR; 22	HUN; FEA; 23	SPA; SPR; Ret	SPA; FEA; 23	ZAN; SPR	ZAN; FEA	MNZ; SPR	MNZ; FEA			38th	0
2023	Campos Racing	BHR; SPR; 13	BHR; FEA; 13	MEL; SPR; 9	MEL; FEA; 10	MON; SPR; 20	MON; FEA; 17	CAT; SPR; Ret	CAT; FEA; 10	RBR; SPR; 14	RBR; FEA; 7	SIL; SPR; 3	SIL; FEA; 5	HUN; SPR; 6	HUN; FEA; 11	SPA; SPR; 19	SPA; FEA; 2	MNZ; SPR; 7	MNZ; FEA; 8			12th	60
2024	ART Grand Prix	BHR; SPR; 14	BHR; FEA; 2	MEL; SPR; 10	MEL; FEA; 10	IMO; SPR; 12	IMO; FEA; 20	MON; SPR; Ret	MON; FEA; 2	CAT; SPR; 11	**CAT**; **FEA**; 2	RBR; SPR; 3	RBR; FEA; 4	SIL; SPR; 12	SIL; FEA; 13	HUN; SPR; 5	HUN; FEA; 4	SPA; SPR; 16	SPA; FEA; 21	MNZ; SPR; 22	MNZ; FEA; 3	5th	112

=== Complete Macau Grand Prix results ===
Year	Team	Car	Qualifying	Quali Race	Main race
2023	(France) ART Grand Prix	Dallara F3 2019	24th	20th	16th

=== Complete Formula Regional Oceania Championship results ===
(key) (Races in bold indicate pole position) (Races in italics indicate fastest lap)

Year	Team	1	2	3	4	5	6	7	8	9	10	11	12	13	14	15	DC	Points
2024	Giles Motorsport	**TAU**; **1**; 2	TAU; 2 Ret	**TAU**; **3**; 2	MAN; 1; 5	MAN; 2; 1	MAN; 3; 2	HMP; 1	HMP; 2	HMP; 3	RUA; 1	RUA; 2	RUA; 3	HIG; 1	HIG; 2	HIG; 3	9th	135

=== Complete FIA Formula 2 Championship results ===
(key) (Races in bold indicate pole position) (Races in italics indicate fastest lap)

Year	Entrant	1	2	3	4	5	6	7	8	9	10	11	12	13	14	15	16	17	18	19	20	21	22	23	24	25	26	27	28	DC	Points
2024	Trident	BHR; SPR	BHR; FEA	JED; SPR	JED; FEA	MEL; SPR	MEL; FEA	IMO; SPR	IMO; FEA	MON; SPR	MON; FEA	CAT; SPR	CAT; FEA	RBR; SPR	RBR; FEA	SIL; SPR	SIL; FEA	HUN; SPR	HUN; FEA	SPA; SPR	SPA; FEA	MNZ; SPR	MNZ; FEA	BAK; SPR; 8	BAK; FEA; 10	LSL; SPR; 15	LSL; FEA; 6	YMC; SPR; 16	YMC; FEA; 16	25th	10

=== Complete International GT Open Results ===
(key) (Races in bold indicate pole position) (Races in italics indicate fastest lap)

Year	Team	Car	Class	1	2	3	4	5	6	7	8	9	10	11	12	13	14	Pos.	Points
2026	Team Motopark	Mercedes-AMG GT3 Evo	Pro	ALG; 1; 2	ALG; 2; 2	**SPA**; **1**; 1	MIS; 1; 9	MIS; 2 Ret	HUN; 1; 2	HUN; 2; 5	LEC; 1; 3	LEC; 2; 2	HOC; 1; 8	HOC; 2; 18	**MNZ**; **1**; 28	**CAT**; **1**; 1	CAT; 2; 8	5th	117

Sporting positions
Preceded by Zane Maloney	F4 British Championship; Rookie Cup; 2020	Succeeded by Matthew Rees
Preceded by Aaron Cameron (S5000)	Tasman Cup; Winner; 2024	Succeeded by Zack Scoular
