= William Karlsson (racing driver) =

Swedish racing driver (born 2005)

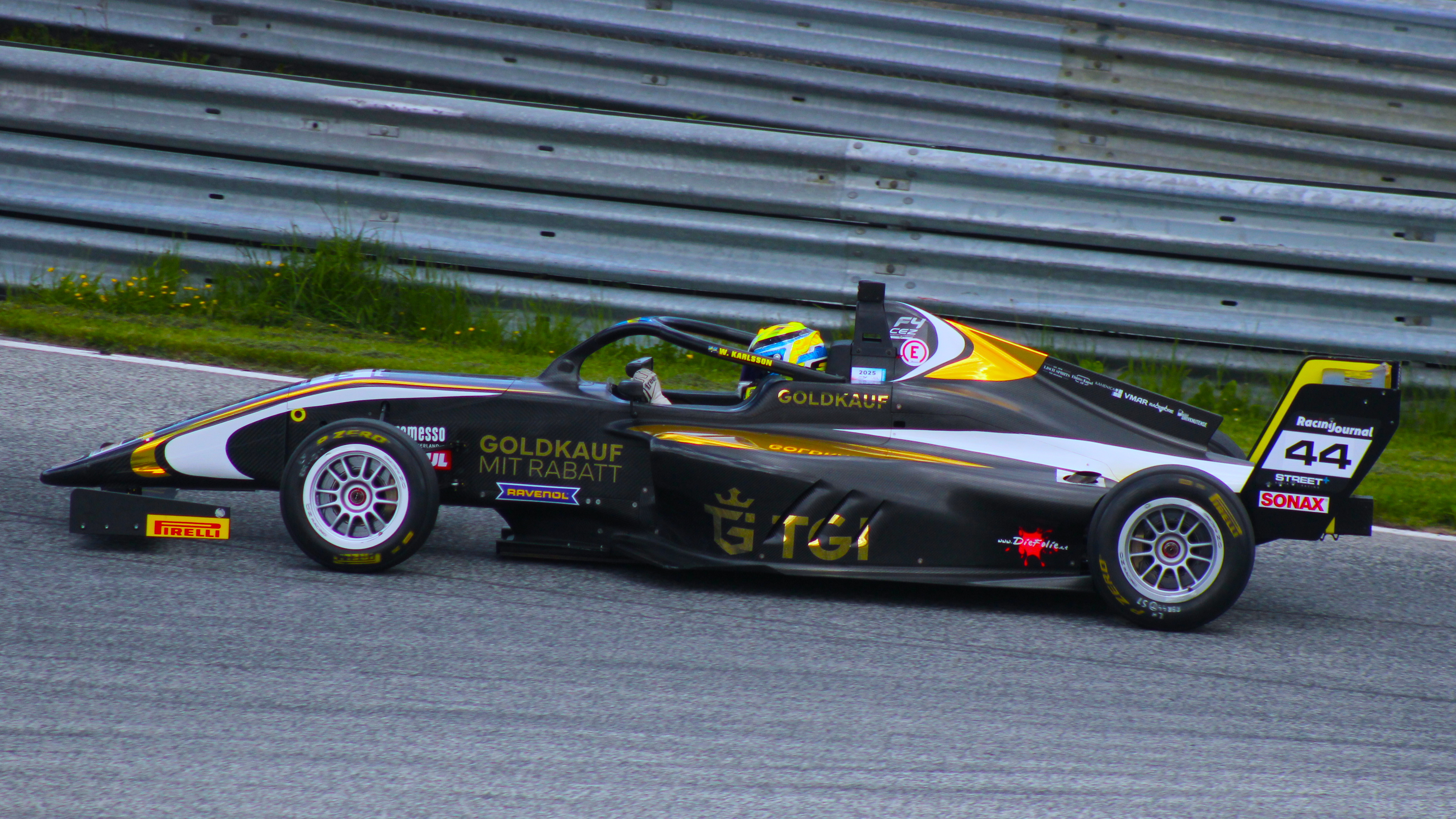
- Karlsson in 2025
- Nationality: (Sweden) Swedish
- Born: 18 October 2005 (age 21) Katrineholm, Sweden
- Relatives: Nicklas Karlsson (father)
- Categorisation: FIA Silver

Championship titles
- 2021: Formula Nordic

William Antonio Karlsson (born 18 October 2005) is a Swedish racing driver who last competed in the LMP3 class of the Le Mans Cup for Inter Europol Competition.

== Personal life ==
Karlsson is the son of Nicklas Karlsson, a former racing driver who founded NIKA Racing in 2006.

== Career ==
Towards the end of 2019, Karlsson made his single-seater debut in the Aquila Synergy Cup Sweden. Moving to his family's NIKA Racing to race in Formula Nordic the following year, Karlsson took his only win of the season at Mantorp Park en route to fifth in points. Remaining in the series for 2021, Karlsson took seven wins and five other podiums to secure the series title. In 2022, Karlsson joined Renauer Motorsport to compete in the ACCR Formula 4 Trophy. However, he later joined BVM Racing to compete in the Italian F4 Championship, taking his only points of the season in race three at the Red Bull Ring.

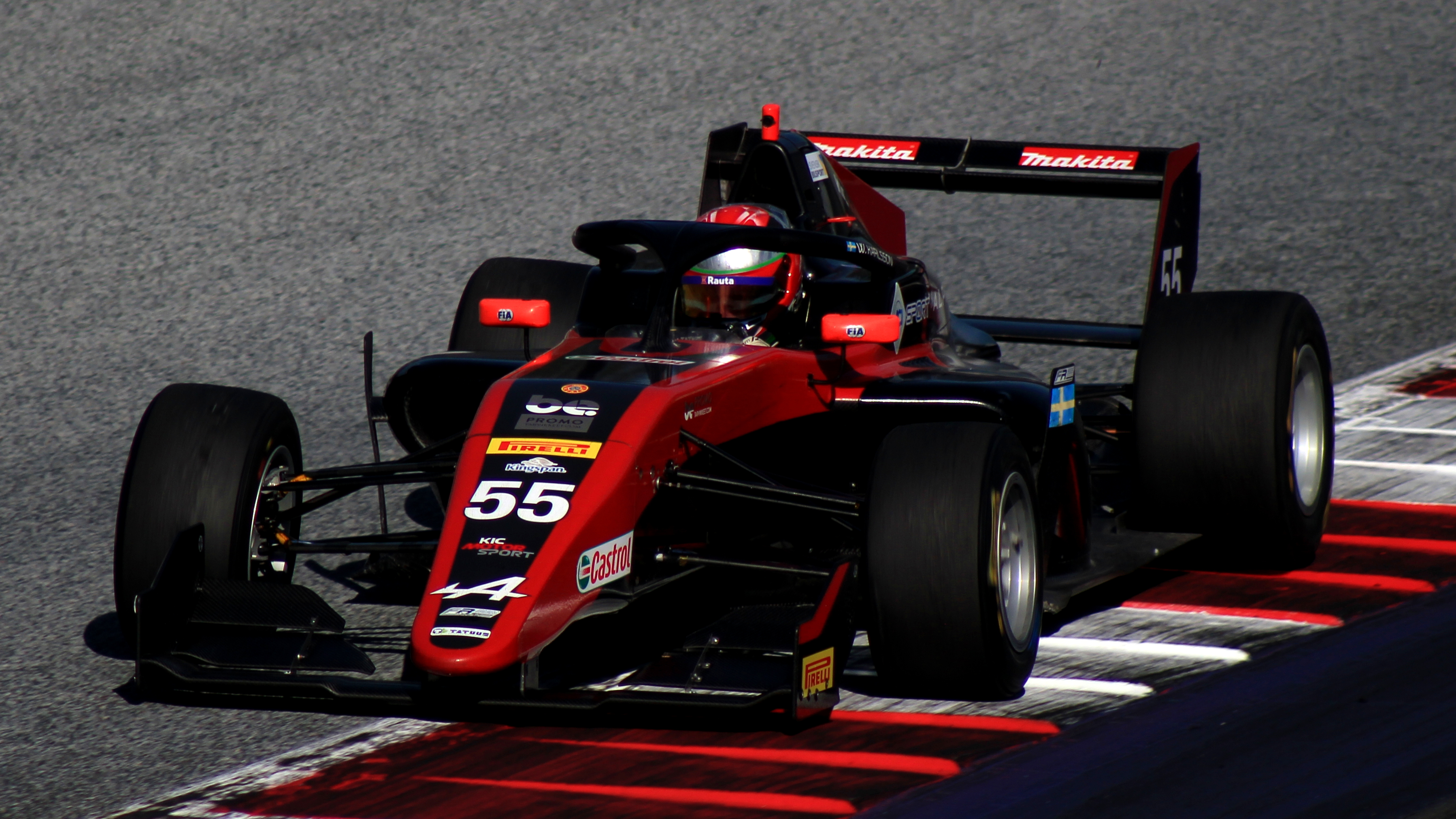
Karlsson driving for KIC Motorsport at the Red Bull Ring in FRECA in 2023.

The following year, Karlsson joined Drivex to compete in the newly-formed Eurocup-3. Competing in the first three rounds, Karlsson scored his only points of the season at Aragón, finishing eighth and ninth in the two races. After a one-off appearance in Porsche Sprint Challenge Scandinavia, Karlsson joined KIC Motorsport to compete in select rounds of the Formula Regional European Championship, taking a best result of 20th at Monza.

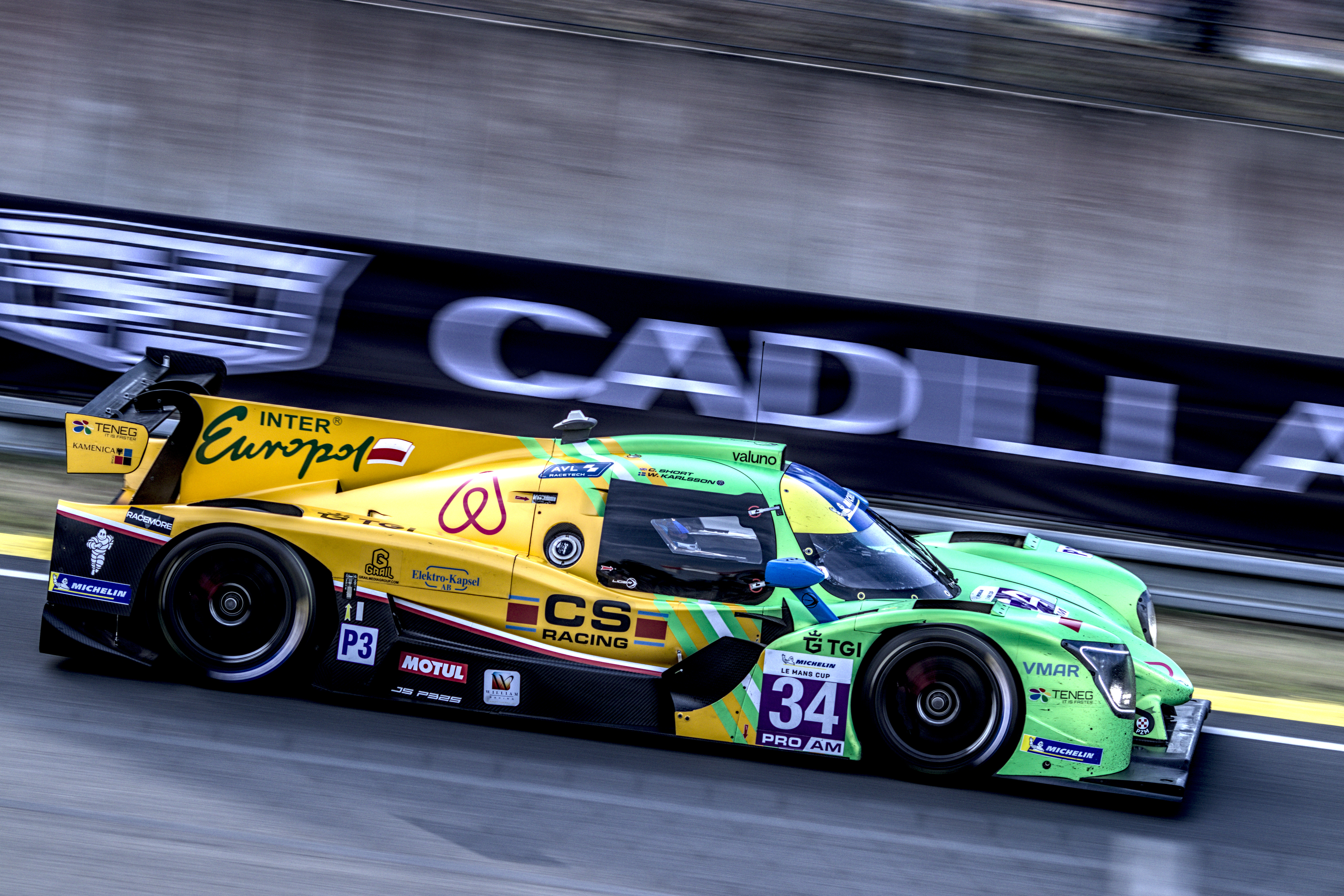
Karlsson's Inter Europol LMP3 at the 2025 Road to Le Mans.

After spending 2024 on the sidelines, Karlsson returned to single-seaters in early 2025 with Renauer Motorsport at the second Red Bull Ring round of F4 CEZ, finishing second twice. During 2025, Karlsson made his endurance prototype debut, racing for Inter Europol Competition at the Road to Le Mans in LMP3 Pro-Am, finishing fifth in both races. In 2026, Karlsson returned to Inter Europol and the Le Mans Cup to compete in his rookie season in the LMP3 class alongside Christian Dannemand Jørgensen, in which he took a best result of 12th at Barcelona before leaving the series mid-season.

== Karting record ==
=== Karting career summary ===
Season	Series	Team	Position
2014	MKR Series Sweden — Cadet	Katrineholms MK	
2015	MKR Series Sweden — Formula Micro		6th
2015	Göteborgs Stora Pris — Micro		5th
2015	Juniorfestivalen — Micro		2nd
2015	Kristianstad KK Grande Finale — Micro		1st
2016	MKR Series Sweden — Junior 60		7th
2016	Swedish Kart Championship — Junior 60	NIKA Racing	10th
2016	Göteborgs Stora Pris — Junior 60	NIKA Racing	5th
2016	WSK Final Cup — 60 Mini	Birel ART Racing	NC
2017	WSK Champions Cup — 60 Mini	Birel ART Racing	NC
2017	WSK Super Master Series — 60 Mini	Birel ART Racing	88th
2017	South Garda Winter Cup — 60 Mini	Birel ART Racing	NC
2017	MKR Series Sweden — Junior 60	KAK Motorsport	4th
2017	Swedish Kart Championship — Junior 60		14th
2017	Raket Cup Sweden — Mini		38th
2017	BNL Golden Trophy — Junior Max		31st
2018	Andrea Margutti Trophy — OK-J	JP Racing	26th
2018	Swedish Championship — OK-J		23rd
2018	SverigeCupen — OK-J		7th
2018	Deutsche Kart-Meisterschaft — OK-J	JP Racing	NC
2018	Karting World Championship — OK-J	JP Racing	NC
2019	South Garda Winter Cup — OK-J	Ward Racing	28th
2019	WSK Super Master Series — OK-J	Ward Racing	77th
2019	Swedish Championship — OK-J		9th
2019	Karting European Championship — OK-J	Nika International	99th
2019	Deutsche Kart-Meisterschaft — OK-J	Nika International	15th

== Racing record ==
=== Racing career summary ===
Season	Series	Team	Races	Wins	Poles	F/Laps	Podiums	Points	Position
2019	Aquila Synergy Cup Sweden		6	0	0	0	0	107	11th
2020	Formula Nordic	NIKA Racing	16	1	0	0	8	199	5th
2021	Formula Nordic	NIKA Racing	15	7	6	5	12	305	**1st**
2022	Italian F4 Championship	BVM Racing	17	0	0	0	0	1	26th
2023	Eurocup-3	Drivex	6	0	0	0	0	6	17th
2023	Porsche Sprint Challenge Scandinavia	Porsche Experience Racing	2	0	0	0	0	16.5	18th
2023	Formula Regional European Championship	KIC Motorsport	4	0	0	0	0	0	40th
2025	Formula 4 CEZ Championship	Renauer Motorsport	3	0	0	0	2	42	14th
2025	Le Mans Cup – LMP3 Pro-Am	Inter Europol Competition	2	0	0	0	0	12	21st
2026	Le Mans Cup – LMP3	Inter Europol Competition	3	0	0	0	0	0	35th

=== Complete Italian F4 Championship results ===
(key) (Races in bold indicate pole position) (Races in italics indicate fastest lap)

Year	Team	1	2	3	4	5	6	7	8	9	10	11	12	13	14	15	16	17	18	19	20	21	22	DC	Points
2022	BVM Racing	IMO; 1	IMO; 2	IMO; 3	MIS; 1 Ret	MIS; 2; 24	MIS; 3; 16	SPA; 1; 23	SPA; 2; 24	SPA; 3; 18	VLL; 1; 22	VLL; 2; 15	VLL; 3; 16	RBR; 1	RBR; 2; 24†	RBR; 3; 10	RBR; 4; 15	MNZ; 1; 13	MNZ; 2; 23	MNZ; 3 C	MUG; 1; 22	MUG; 2; 29	MUG; 3; 19	26th	1

=== Complete Eurocup-3 results ===
(key) (Races in bold indicate pole position) (Races in italics indicate fastest lap)

Year	Team	1	2	3	4	5	6	7	8	9	10	11	12	13	14	15	16	DC	Points
2023	Drivex	SPA; 1; 11	SPA; 2; 14	ARA; 1; 8	ARA; 2; 9	MNZ; 1; 13	MNZ; 2; 12	ZAN; 1	ZAN; 2	JER; 1	JER; 2	EST; 1	EST; 2	CRT; 1	CRT; 2	CAT; 1	CAT; 2	17th	6

=== Complete Formula Regional European Championship results ===
(key) (Races in bold indicate pole position) (Races in italics indicate fastest lap)

Year	Team	1	2	3	4	5	6	7	8	9	10	11	12	13	14	15	16	17	18	19	20	DC	Points
2023	KIC Motorsport	IMO; 1	IMO; 2	CAT; 1	CAT; 2	HUN; 1	HUN; 2	SPA; 1	SPA; 2	MUG; 1	MUG; 2	LEC; 1	LEC; 2	RBR; 1; 28	RBR; 2; 24	MNZ; 1; 20	MNZ; 2; 25	ZAN; 1	ZAN; 2	HOC; 1	HOC; 2	40th	0

=== Complete Formula 4 CEZ Championship results ===
(key) (Races in bold indicate pole position) (Races in italics indicate fastest lap)

Year	Team	1	2	3	4	5	6	7	8	9	10	11	12	13	14	15	16	17	18	DC	Points
2025	Renauer Motorsport	RBR1; 1	RBR1; 2	RBR1; 3	RBR2; 1; 2	RBR2; 2; 2	RBR2; 3; 7	SAL; 1	SAL; 2	SAL; 3	MOS; 1	MOS; 2	MOS; 3	SVK; 1	SVK; 2	SVK; 3	BRN; 1	BRN; 2	BRN; 3	14th	42

=== Complete Le Mans Cup results ===
(key) (Races in bold indicate pole position; results in italics indicate fastest lap)

Year	Entrant	Class	Chassis	1	2	3	4	5	6	7	Rank	Points
2025	Inter Europol Competition	LMP3 Pro-Am	Ligier JS P325	BAR	LEC	LMS; 1; 5	LMS; 2; 5	SPA	SIL	POR	21st	12
2026	Inter Europol Competition	LMP3	Ligier JS P325	CAT; 12	LEC; Ret	LMS; 16	SPA	SIL	ALG		35th	0
