= 2020 Formula Nordic =

Motor racing championship held in 2020

Seasons
- ← 2019 2021 →

The 2020 Formula Nordic season was the eighth season of the single-seater championship, and the second independent of the STCC branding, following the formation of the series' own association in the wake of the STCC promoter's bankruptcy in 2018. Formula Nordic continued to use the previous Formula Renault 1.6 chassis and engines, as it used to go under the name of Formula Renault 1.6 Nordic before Renault Sport dropped its support for the 3.5 and 1.6 classes in late 2015. The season began on 19 July at Falkenbergs Motorbana and concluded on 10 October at Ring Knutstorp after six rounds, with Joel Granfors taking both Nordic Cup and JSM titles.

== Drivers and teams ==
Team	No.	Drivers	Rounds
(Sweden) Granforce Racing	5	(Sweden) Joel Granfors	2–6
(Norway) Team Greenpower	7	(Sweden) Ella Benje	All
(Norway) Team Greenpower	21	(Norway) Håvard Hallerud	All
(Sweden) NIKA Racing	16	(Sweden) Calle Bergman	All
(Sweden) NIKA Racing	44	(Sweden) William Karlsson	All
(Sweden) Winsth Racing	17	(Sweden) William Winsth	All
(Sweden) Philips Racing Team	23	(Sweden) Philip Zielinski	1–2, 5–6
(Sweden) WestCoast Racing	37	(Sweden) Maja Hallén Fellenius	All
(Sweden) WestCoast Racing	55	(Sweden) Philip Victorsson	All
Privateer	82	(Sweden) Isak Sjökvist	5
Privateer	101	(Sweden) Charlie Andersen	1–4
Privateer	111	(Sweden) Elias Adestam	6
Privateer	121	(Sweden) Mille Johansson	2

== Race calendar and results ==
The season started on the 19 July at Falkenbergs Motorbana and concluded on 10 October at Ring Knutstorp after six rounds, often supported by the Porsche Carrera Cup Scandinavia and the TCR Scandinavia, the successor to the STCC, as well as various GT series. Like the previous season, the use of reversed grid races for the final race of the weekend, where the top 6 were inverted, was continued. Due to the COVID-19 pandemic and the resulting travel restrictions put in place, this was the first season since 2016 that Rudskogen would not feature on the calendar.

Round		Circuit	Date	Pole position	Fastest lap	Winning driver
1	R1	(Sweden) Falkenbergs Motorbana, Bergagård	19 July	(Norway) Håvard Hallerud	(Norway) Håvard Hallerud	(Norway) Håvard Hallerud
1	R2	(Sweden) Falkenbergs Motorbana, Bergagård	19 July		(Norway) Håvard Hallerud	(Norway) Håvard Hallerud
1	R3	(Sweden) Falkenbergs Motorbana, Bergagård	19 July		(Sweden) William Winsth	(Sweden) Philip Victorsson
2	R1	(Sweden) Gelleråsen Arena, Karlskoga	14 August	(Sweden) Joel Granfors (Note: Hallerud recorded the fastest time but was disqualified, with Granfors recording the second fastest time being promoted to pole sitter.)	(Sweden) Joel Granfors	(Sweden) Joel Granfors
2	R2	(Sweden) Gelleråsen Arena, Karlskoga	15 August		(Norway) Håvard Hallerud	(Sweden) Joel Granfors
2	R3	(Sweden) Gelleråsen Arena, Karlskoga	16 August		(Sweden) Joel Granfors	(Sweden) Calle Bergman
3	R1	(Sweden) Skellefteå Drivecenter Arena, Fällfors	29 August	(Norway) Håvard Hallerud	(Sweden) Joel Granfors	(Sweden) Joel Granfors
3	R2	(Sweden) Skellefteå Drivecenter Arena, Fällfors	29 August		(Sweden) Joel Granfors	(Sweden) Joel Granfors
3	R3	(Sweden) Skellefteå Drivecenter Arena, Fällfors	29 August		(Sweden) Joel Granfors	(Sweden) Joel Granfors
4	R1	(Sweden) Anderstorp Raceway, Anderstorp	18 September	(Sweden) William Winsth	(Norway) Håvard Hallerud	(Sweden) William Winsth
4	R2	(Sweden) Anderstorp Raceway, Anderstorp	19 September		(Sweden) Philip Victorsson	(Sweden) Charlie Andersen
4	R3	(Sweden) Anderstorp Raceway, Anderstorp	19 September		(Sweden) Joel Granfors	(Sweden) Joel Granfors
5	R1	(Sweden) Mantorp Park, Mantorp	3 October	(Sweden) Joel Granfors	(Norway) Håvard Hallerud	(Sweden) William Winsth
5	R2	(Sweden) Mantorp Park, Mantorp	3 October		(Sweden) Joel Granfors	(Sweden) William Karlsson
6	R1	(Sweden) Ring Knutstorp, Kågeröd	10 October	(Norway) Håvard Hallerud	(Norway) Håvard Hallerud	(Sweden) Joel Granfors
6	R2	(Sweden) Ring Knutstorp, Kågeröd	10 October		(Sweden) Philip Victorsson	(Sweden) Philip Victorsson

== Championship standings ==
Qualifying points system

Points are awarded to the top 5 fastest qualifying times.

Position	**1st**	**2nd**	**3rd**	**4th**	**5th**
Points	5	4	3	2	1

Race points system

Points are awarded to the top 10 classified finishers, no points are offered for fastest lap.

Position	**1st**	**2nd**	**3rd**	**4th**	**5th**	**6th**	**7th**	**8th**	**9th**	**10th**
Points	25	18	15	12	10	8	6	4	2	1

Two championships are held, the Junior Svenskt Mästerskap (JSM) for drivers under 26 years old holding a Swedish driver license, and the Formula Nordic Cup, the latter serving as the overall championship.

=== Formula Nordic Drivers' Championship (Nordic Cup and JSM) ===
Pos	Driver	FAL			KAR			SKE			AND			MAN		KNU		Pts
1	(Sweden) Joel Granfors				**1**	1	3	1	1	1	DNS	4	1	**1**	7	1	4	264
2	(Norway) Håvard Hallerud	**1**	1	Ret	Ret	4	2	**8**	4	3	2	7	5	2	2	**3**	3	234
3	(Sweden) Philip Victorsson	2	5	1	6	5	4	2	3	2	5	2	8	4	4	9	1	221
4	(Sweden) William Winsth	Ret	2	2	4	3	7	3	2	4	**1**	6	4	5	6	5	Ret	201
5	(Sweden) William Karlsson	3	4	3	7	Ret	11	9	5	5	3	5	3	3	1	2	2	199
6	(Sweden) Calle Bergman	6	7	7	3	7	1	4	7	7	4	8	2	8	5	10	9	145
7	(Sweden) Charlie Andersen	DSQ	3	4	2	2	6	5	6	6	DNS	1	6					137
8	(Sweden) Maja Hallén Fellenius	4	6	5	5	Ret	5	6	8	Ret	6	3	7	Ret	3	6	6	128
9	(Sweden) Philip Zielinski	5	8	6	9	8	9							6	8	4	5	64
10	(Sweden) Ella Benje	7	9	8	10	9	10	7	9	8	7	9	9	9	10	8	8	49
11	(Sweden) Mille Johansson				8	6	8											16
12	(Sweden) Elias Adestam															7	7	12
13	(Sweden) Isak Sjökvist													7	9			8
Pos	Driver	FAL			KAR			SKE			AND			MAN		KNU		Pts

Colour	Result
Gold	Winner
Silver	Second place
Bronze	Third place
Green	Points classification
Blue	Non-points classification
Blue	Non-classified finish (NC)
Purple	Retired, not classified (Ret)
Red	Did not qualify (DNQ)
Red	Did not pre-qualify (DNPQ)
Black	Disqualified (DSQ)
White	Did not start (DNS)
White	Withdrew (WD)
White	Race cancelled (C)
Blank	Did not practice (DNP)
Blank	Did not arrive (DNA)
Blank	Excluded (EX)

**Bold** – Pole
Italics – Fastest Lap
