= Luke Browning =

British racing driver (born 2002)

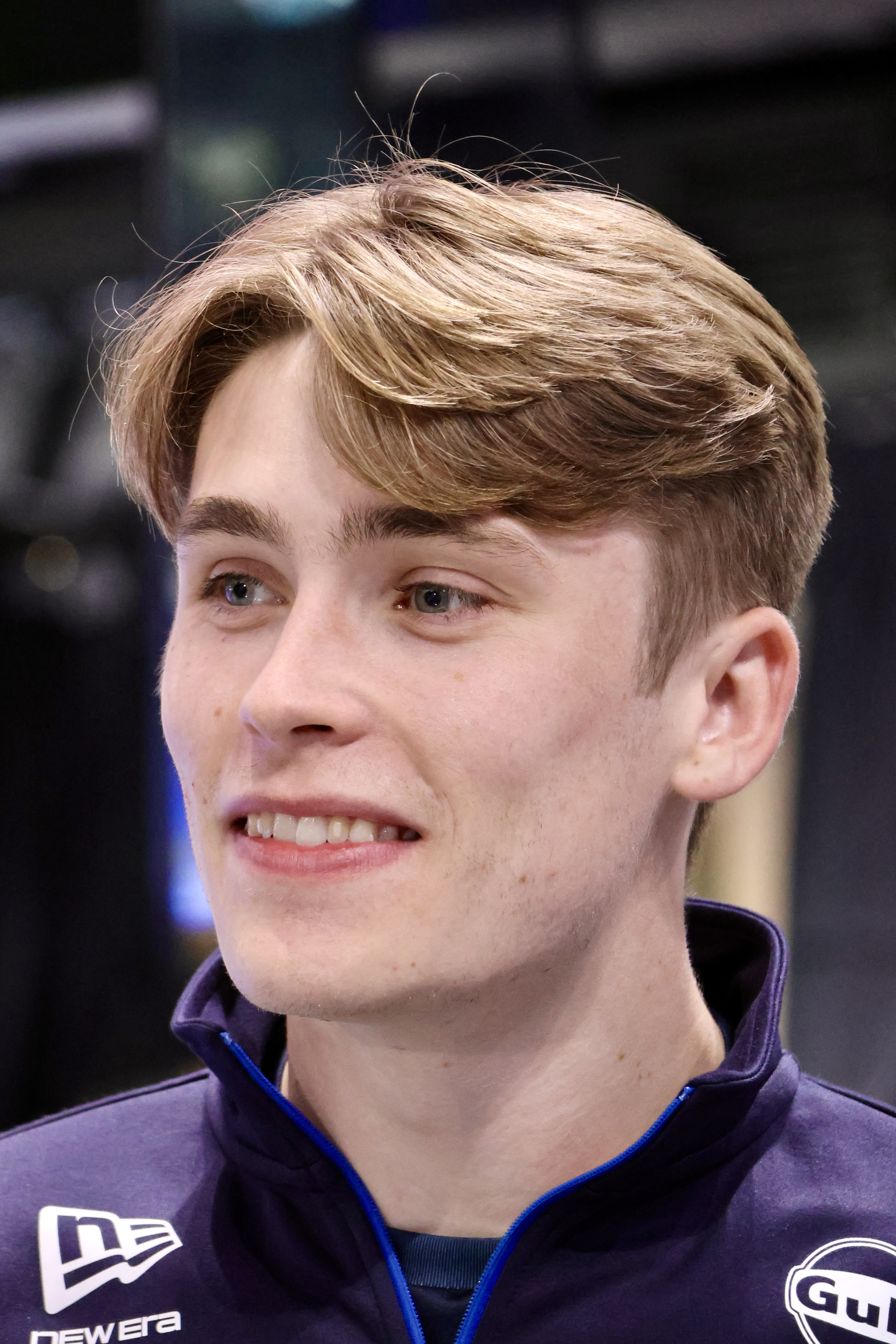
- Browning in 2026
- Nationality: (United Kingdom) British
- Born: Luke Geoff Browning; 31 January 2002 (age 24) Kingsley, Cheshire, England

Super Formula Championship career
- Debut season: 2026
- Current team: Realize Kondo Racing
- Categorisation: FIA Gold
- Car number: 3
- Starts: 10
- Wins: 0
- Podiums: 0
- Poles: 0
- Fastest laps: 0
- Best finish: TBD in 2026

Previous series
- 2024–2025; 2023–2024; 2023; 2022; 2021–2022; 2021; 2021; 2021; 2019–2020; 2017–2018; 2016–2017: FIA Formula 2; FIA Formula 3; FR Middle East; F4 UAE; GB3; Drexler Automotive F4; ADAC F4; Italian F4; F4 British; Ginetta Junior; Junior Saloon Car

Championship titles
- 2023; 2022; 2020: Macau Grand Prix; GB3; F4 British

Awards
- 2022: Aston Martin Autosport BRDC Award

Luke Geoff Browning (born 31 January 2002) is a British racing driver who competes in Super Formula for Kondo Racing as part of the Williams Driver Academy and serves as a reserve driver in Formula One for Williams.

Browning made his car racing debut in 2016 in Junior Saloon Car, moving to Ginetta Junior the year after where he placed third in 2018. He moved up to British F4 in 2019, and won the title in 2020. Browning made a sideways step in 2021 to Italian F4, finishing third, before winning the 2022 GB3 title. Browning graduated to FIA Formula 3 in 2023 where he became a member of the Williams Driver Academy, finishing third in the 2024 with Hitech Pulse-Eight. He was promoted early to Formula 2 in 2024 with ART Grand Prix, before returning to Hitech in 2025, finishing fourth after one win and multiple podiums.

Browning was awarded the Aston Martin Autosport BRDC Award for 2022. He is the winner of the 2023 Macau Grand Prix.

== Early and personal life ==
Browning was born on 31 January 2002 in Kingsley, Cheshire. He was initially racing in motocross at an early age, but switched to four wheels after his mother deemed it as "too dangerous".

Browning enjoys sim racing during his downtime and is part of four-time Formula One world champion Max Verstappen's sim racing team, Team Redline.

== Junior racing career ==
=== Junior Saloon Car Championship ===
In 2016, Browning made his debut in car racing, competing in the Junior Saloon Car Championship in the UK. He won a race and was awarded the title "Henry Surtees Teen Racer of the Year 2016", having finished ninth in his first year in motorsport.

=== Ginetta Junior Championship ===
==== 2017 ====
For 2017, Browning made a switch to the Ginetta Junior Championship with Richardson Racing. His season highlight would end up being a pole position he scored in the second Silverstone race, and he placed eleventh in the standings.

==== 2018 ====
In the following season, Browning stayed on with Richardson Racing. His season started out strongly, with three victories after four races. However, over the course of the season he lost out to the Elite Motorsport duo of Louis Foster and eventual champion Adam Smalley. He scored enough points to win the championship taking Oulton Park into account, only to lose his race 1 win due to a mechanical infringement. He went on to win race 2 in dramatic style by 11 seconds. Ultimately, he finished in third position after a neck and neck season with a total of eight victories and ten further podium finishes.

=== Formula 4 ===
==== 2019 ====
Browning progressed to the F4 British Championship in 2019, once again remaining with Richardson Racing. He won his first ever single-seater race at the opening race of the season, a very wet Brands Hatch. Having started the race from a lowly tenth place after engine issues in qualifying he made a similar drive through the field in the mixed condition race 2, only to collide with Zane Maloney on the last corner on the final lap. He took the chequered flag first, but was later docked to third after a ten-second time penalty. Browning added to that tally with a victory at the Thruxton Circuit. That win would prove to be the last of the year, despite crossing the line first in Snetterton. However, a post-race penalty due to a jump start would drop him to third in the end. He concluded the season with a triple podium in Brands Hatch. He ended up sixth in the championship, with two wins, and nine podiums.

==== 2020 ====
In 2020, Browning moved to Fortec Motorsport for his title push season of British F4, partnering Rafael Villagómez and Roberto Faria for parts of the season. The season was memorable for the tight battle for the title between Browning and Carlin's Zak O'Sullivan. The pair exchanged victories at almost every weekend, with the round at Thruxton being the only exception. At the opening two rounds, he scored four second places, but it was at Oulton Park where he would complete a cleans sweep. He continued his form at Knockhill, taking two more wins and a podium. However, he would not win again until the penultimate round in Snetterton, by which O'Sullivan had closed down the points gap. Despite a win in the first race, O'Sullivan won the next two races which meant both came into the title deciding round even on points, in Brands Hatch. He took a wet double pole position, boosting his title chances and also winning the first race. Even with O'Sullivan winning the final race, the race was halted midway and half-points were awarded, and Browning was crowned champion by a lead of only four points. He took seven wins, six poles and sixteen podiums.

==== 2021 ====
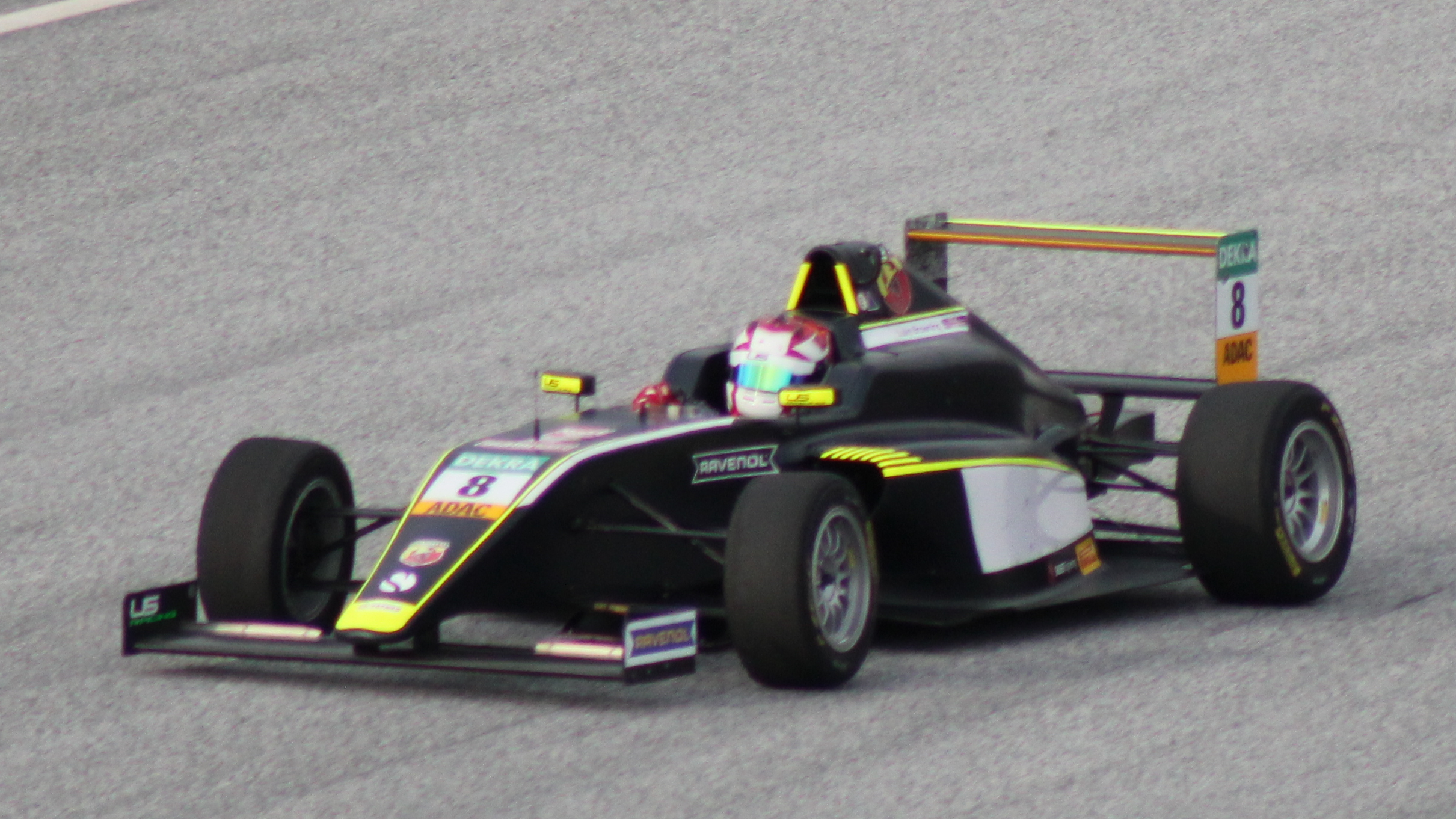
Browning racing in the 2021 ADAC Formula 4 Championship at the Red Bull Ring.

For 2021, Browning moved to mainland Europe to compete in the ADAC Formula 4 with US Racing. He started strong at the Red Bull Ring, taking a win during the third race. He scored a double podium in round 3 and 4, at both Hockenheimring and Sachsenring. At the second Hockenheimring round, he again claimed his second win in the final race, having held off Joshua Dufek in the dying last laps. He ended the season in Nürburgring with another double podium, putting him third overall in the championship, behind Tim Tramnitz and champion Oliver Bearman.

Browning also took part in the first round of the Italian F4 Championship, scoring a second place in Circuit Paul Ricard. This result placed him 15th overall in the standings.

=== GB3 Championship ===
==== 2021 ====
On 9 September 2021, Browning announced that he would be making his debut in the GB3 Championship at Oulton Park. Driving for his title-winning outfit from the previous year, he experienced an eventful one off weekend in the 2021 season. He finished his first race in the category in second place, only behind the dominant Zak O'Sullivan, but was disqualified due to an illegal skid block. He overtook the latter around the outside of turn one and went on to win the second race. He was caught up in an unavoidable incident in the full reverse grid race 3 and retired shortly after. He was 25th in the standings.

==== 2022 ====
Browning would team up with Hitech Grand Prix to participate in the full 2022 season. He was sensational in the first round at Oulton Park, taking a double pole. He proceeded to then win twice, even winning the first race by a ten-second margin. He continued his form with a double podium in the first Silverstone round, and a second place in Donington Park. He would win again the next round at Snetterton, winning Race 2 from pole whilst beating his title rival Joel Granfors in a tight battle saw Browning retake the standings lead again. In Spa-Francorchamps, he again took a double win which solidified his lead further. However, the pair of victories would be his last of his campaign, and he went podium-less for the first time during the second Silverstone round due to being disqualified in qualifying. This meant he lost the championship lead to Granfors. A double podium in Brands Hatch brought the championship lead back to Browning, as 15.5 points split the pair heading into the finale at Donington. Having scored yet another double podium, he clinched the title with a race to spare. Having taken five wins and a further eight podiums, Browning stated that "he couldn't be happier" as he wrapped up his second single-seater title.

=== Formula Regional ===
During the 2023 pre-season, Browning joined Hitech Grand Prix for the second and third rounds of the 2023 Formula Regional Middle East Championship. He scored points in his first two races and placed 26th in the standings with eight points.

=== FIA Formula 3 Championship ===
==== 2023 ====
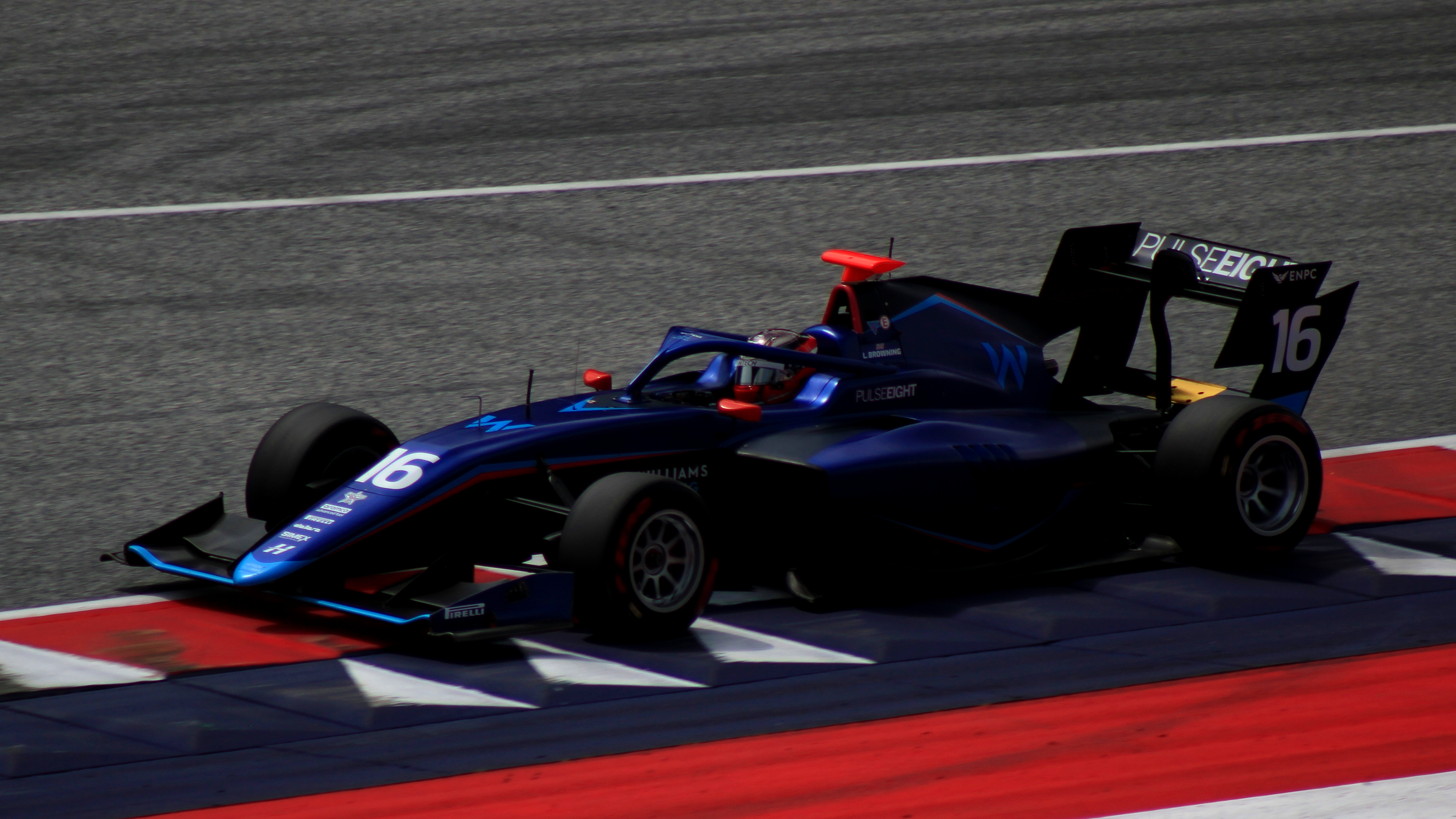
Browning driving the Dallara F3 2019 during the 2023 Spielberg Formula 3 round.

Browning partook in the 2023 Formula 3 pre-season testing with Hitech Pulse-Eight. On 1 March 2023, just two days before the season started, Hitech announced the signing of Browning, ultimately completing its F3 roster for the upcoming season. He qualified 17th on debut in Bahrain, but the sprint race ended in disappointment, getting tagged by Hugh Barter. However, he stunned with an epic recovery drive during the feature race, passing car after car for fifth place. He cracked into the top 12 in Melbourne qualifying, putting him fourth for the sprint. Despite scooting to second early on, it included contact Oliver Goethe which took him out of the race. He would briefly go airborne in a battle with teammate Sebastián Montoya. The Briton suffered damage to his car, eventually finishing 11th before a penalty for contact with Goethe dropped him to 17th. He had another penalty-stricken race in the feature, this time for colliding with Franco Colapinto which dropped him from sixth to eighth.

Browning qualified a season-best fourth in Monaco. He had his most successful weekend, finishing eighth in the sprint and narrowly missing the podium to Paul Aron in the feature race. In Barcelona, he had a tussle for the lead with his former British F4 rival and Williams Driver Academy member Zak O'Sullivan during the sprint race, but ultimately settled for second place as he took his first F3 podium. However, his feature race quickly ended on the first lap after contact with Leonardo Fornaroli. He had a poor second half of the season, due to unfortunate collisions especially in Austria and Silverstone. In Spa-Francorchamps, he returned to the points for the final time during the sprint race, finishing eighth. A good drive followed in the Monza sprint race. After being disqualified from qualifying, he rose from 27th to fifth place, but it went unrewarded as he was disqualified again for an illegal car floor. He finished 15th in the standings, with 41 points.

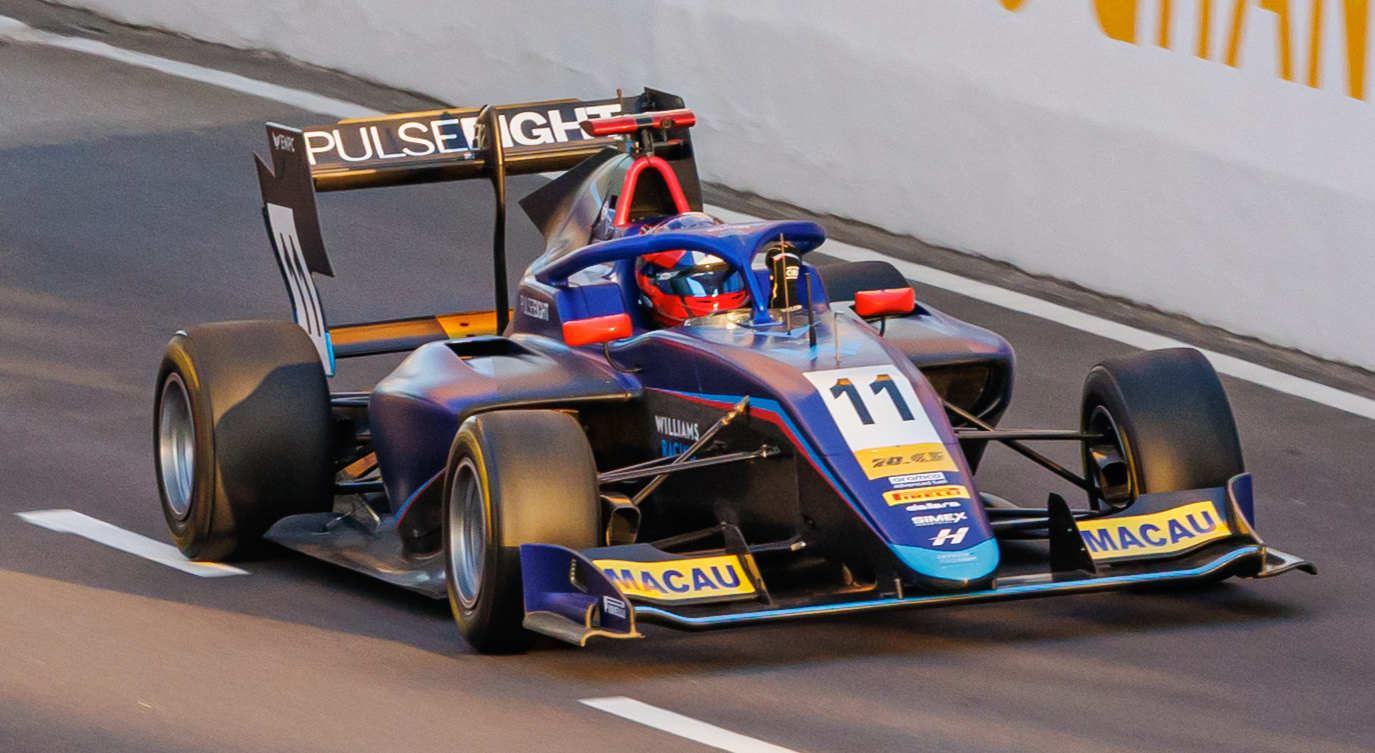
Browning at the 2023 Macau Grand Prix

Browning remained with Hitech for the post-season testing sessions, setting the fastest lap on the first day in Barcelona. He then took part in the Macau Grand Prix with Hitech. He took pole for the qualification race, despite having no prior experience to the circuit. He then proceeded to win the qualification race, fending off teammate Minì. From there in the main race, despite a challenge from Dennis Hauger, he persevered to take the Macau Grand Prix victory despite multiple restarts. Following the race, he revealed he watched "every start of Macau" in order to defend his lead.

==== 2024 ====
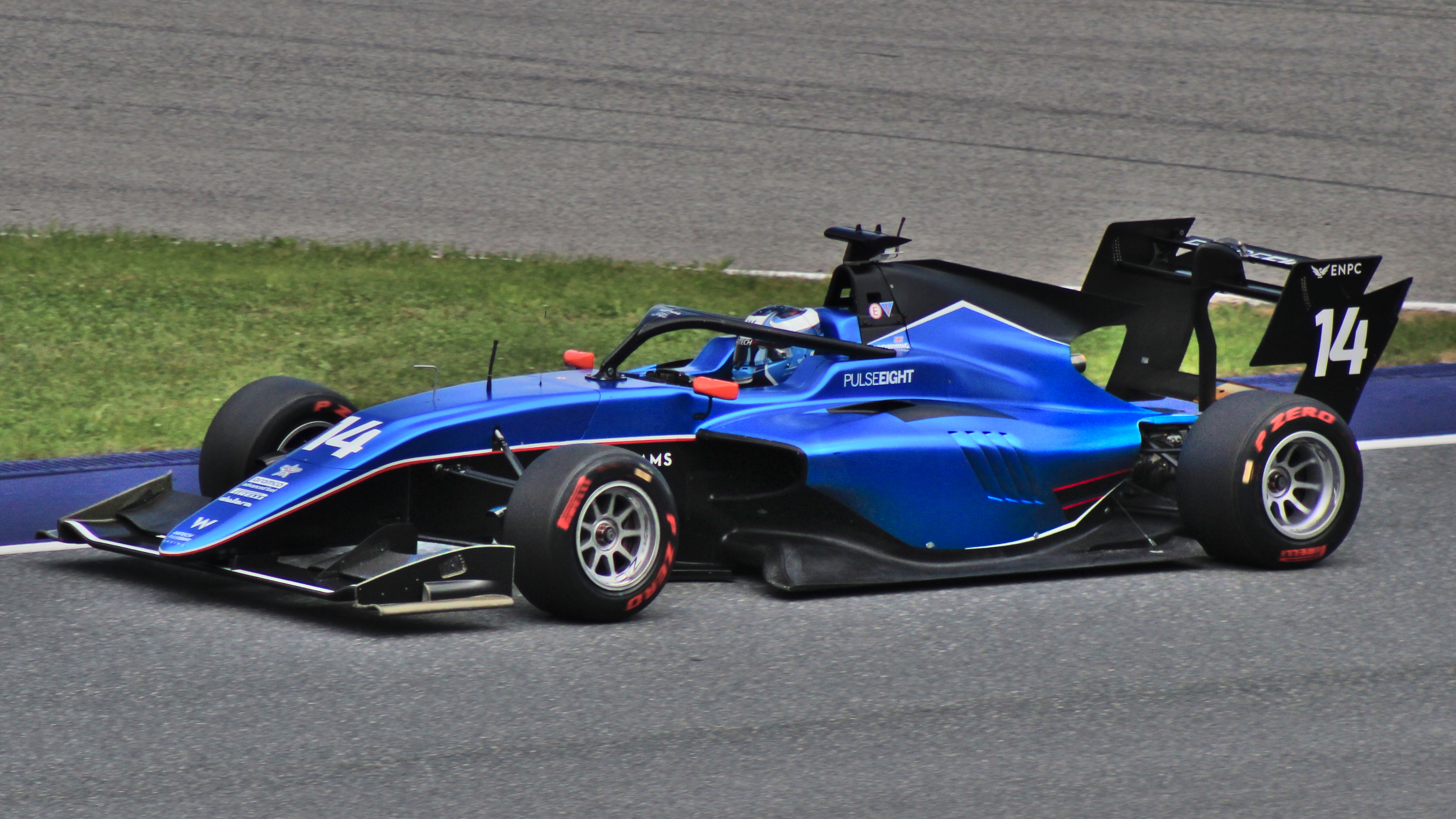
Browning driving for Hitech Pulse-Eight during the 2024 Spielberg Formula 3 round

Browning continued his relationship with Hitech Pulse-Eight for the 2024 Formula 3 season. He qualified second during the Bahrain season opener. He was hit with a ten-second penalty during the sprint race for gaining an advantage whilst running off-track, which demoted him from seventh to 15th. In the feature race, He assumed the race lead early on after polesitter Dino Beganovic stalled. He suffered an engine scare mid-race as he came under pressure, but pressed on for his first Formula 3 victory. He secured fifth in qualifying at Melbourne, but was forced to pit early in the sprint race due to a steering wheel issue. Making up a place of Nikita Bedrin early on and a battle with Gabriele Minì, he would finish the feature race in fourth, retaining his championship lead.

Browning qualified ninth in Imola, but was hit with disappointment in the sprint as he attempted an unsuccessful overtake on Kacper Sztuka during the penultimate lap, which broke his front wing and beached him in the gravel. He recovered to fourth place in the feature race, but lost the standings lead. In Monaco, he secured third in Monaco qualifying. He made up two places on the opening lap to finish eighth in the sprint race, and maintained his position in the feature to grab third. He secured a fifth place in the feature race at Barcelona, as Leonardo Fornaroli and Oliver Goethe both passed him on the final lap for the podium position. He battled to his first pole in Austria. Despite a grid penalty for the sprint race, he advanced to the points early on, but was forced to take avoiding action in an incident and dropped to 11th. Regardless, he led every lap to claim a lights-to-flag victory in the feature race.

A second consecutive pole came in Browning's home Silverstone event. A collision with Tim Tramnitz curtailed his sprint early, and the wrong choice of tyres during a damp track led to Browning finishing eighth. His toughest weekend came in Hungary, crashing in qualifying and was confined down to 15th. His only points came with eighth in the sprint, and failed to replicate a comeback in the feature. He qualified seventh in Spa-Francorchamps. He was embroiled in multiple during the sprint race that placed him sixth, but was demoted to 12th due to a track limits penalty. He again finished sixth in the feature, meaning he third in the standings with 123 points heading into the season finale.

Browning qualified a disappointing 13th in Monza, and in the sprint he would charge from 13th to sixth. Needing to outscore standings leader Fornaroli by seven points to win the title, his chances ended abruptly with a spin at Ascari in the opening laps. He charged through to 13th place but was later penalised for a collision with Joseph Loake, dropping him to 20th. He finished third in the championship with 128 points, taking three podiums with two being wins, and 2 pole positions.

=== FIA Formula 2 Championship ===
==== 2024 ====
After Zak O'Sullivan was forced to vacate his seat at ART Grand Prix, Browning was confirmed by the French team to make his Formula 2 debut for the final three rounds of the 2024 season. Browning qualified 11th on debut in Baku, and scored his first points with seventh place in a solid drive during the feature race. He failed to score points from 14th in Qatar, after an unfortunate safety car timing in the feature race meant his alternate strategy did not pay off. In Yas Marina, Browning qualified 17th, but a chaotic feature meant he shot up the order to sixth, scoring points. In the feature race, he finished in 15th place. Across his three-round stint, Browning scored seven points and finished 26th in the standings.

==== 2025 ====
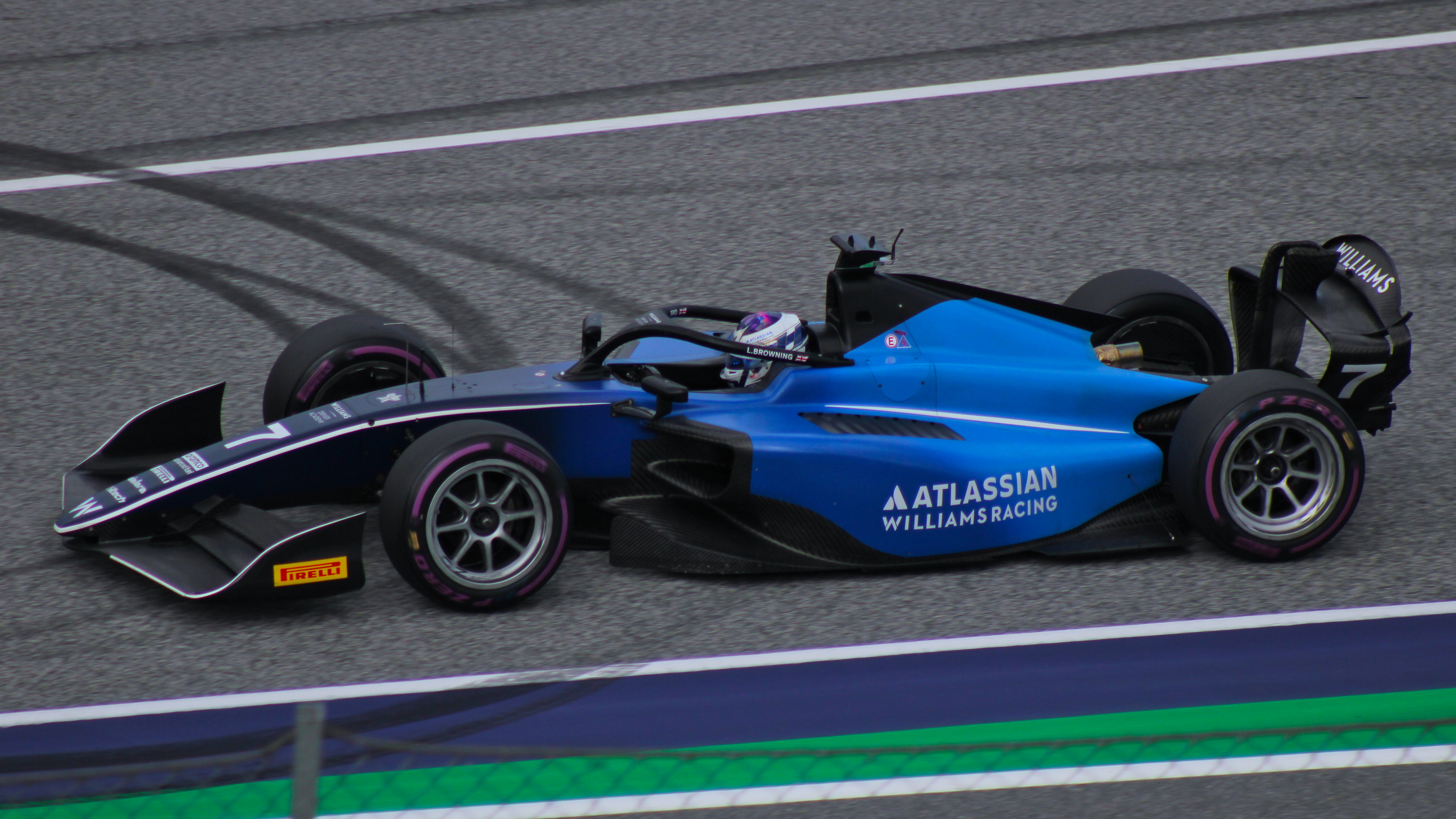
Browning driving the Dallara F2 2024 during the 2025 Spielberg Formula 2 round

Browning continued his relationship with Hitech TGR for the full 2025 Formula 2 season, alongside Dino Beganovic. He started the season well with his first podium in the series during the Melbourne sprint race. Qualifying third in Bahrain, he failed to score in the sprint after a slow start, but managed to finish on the podium again in the feature race on the alternate strategy, taking a second place. In Jeddah, he qualified fourth, and finished sixth in the feature race after fending off Alex Dunne towards the end of the race. Browning returned to the rostrum during the Imola sprint race, having overtook Ritomo Miyata on lap 14 to move into the podium positions. Starting seventh, he assumed the net race lead following the pit stops, but was unable to fend off Dunne for the win and he ultimately finished second. Browning earned his third successive podium during the Monaco sprint race despite a slow start from second, but inherited third place after a penalty for Arvid Lindblad. His run of podium results attracted praise from Hitech team manager Clive Hatton. Having avoided the opening lap chaos in the feature race, Browning managed to finish in fourth place, thereby taking the championship lead. This was immediately lost following a tough weekend in Barcelona where he only scored three points, as his suffered his first Sunday non-score after breaking his front wing in a collision with Miyata.

Browning suffered his first retirement in the Austria sprint race after being caught up in a collision, where his Hitech was struck by Sami Meguetounif's inverted car which had bounced off Arvid Lindblad. Nevertheless, he recovered twelve places from P17 in the feature race to finish in fifth position. Browning collided with Victor Martins during the final lap of the Silverstone sprint race, and received a penalty which dropped him out of the points. He had an incredible charge on Sunday from 12th, as despite treacherous conditions, he made it onto the podium in third. In Spa-Francorchamps, Browning's sprint race ended on the opening lap after contact with Richard Verschoor and Jak Crawford. He replicated his Silverstone charge in the feature race, improving to third and scoring another podium after starting 12th yet again, despite a spin following his pit stop. Browning was dropped out of the points in the Budapest sprint race for gaining an advantage off-track, but rebounded with fourth place the next day.

Browning secured his first pole in Monza. Having finished the sprint in eighth, Browning controlled most of the feature race from pole to seal his first F2 victory. In Baku, Browning followed Beganovic home for second in the sprint race, helping Hitech secure a 1-2 finish for the first time since 2020. His feature race was more difficult, as he collided with Roman Staněk which necessitated a front wing change. A challenging end to the season followed where he qualified outside the top 10 in the final two rounds, and scored only once during the Qatar feature race. Browning finished the season fourth in the drivers' standings with one win, one pole and nine podiums.

== Formula One ==
At the end of April 2023, Browning was announced as a member of the Williams Driver Academy. During late October, Browning drove the Aston Martin AMR21 at the Silverstone Circuit as part of his reward for claiming the Autosport BRDC Award the previous year.

Browning took part in his first free practice session (FP1) with Williams at the 2024 Abu Dhabi Grand Prix, where he finished his debut session in 20th. He also drove the Williams FW46 again during the post-season young drivers' test, completing 105 laps and placing 11th in the overall classification.

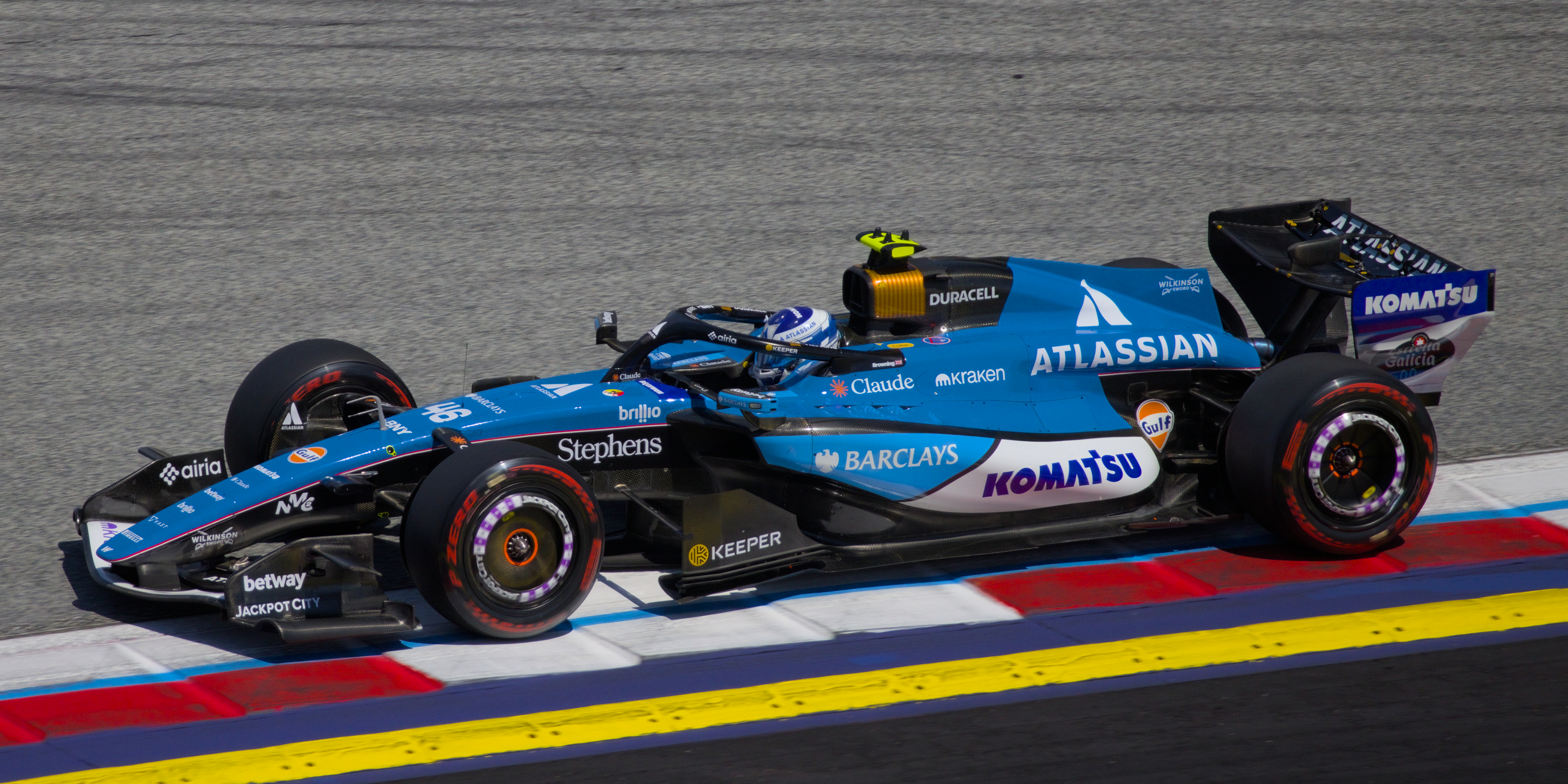
Browning testing the FW48 during the FP1 of the 2026 Austrian Grand Prix

In 2025, Browning drove for Williams in free practice at the Bahrain Grand Prix, finishing 13th in the timesheets and placing as the highest of the six rookies that participated. He drove for the team once again at the Mexico City Grand Prix, finishing the session eighteenth. He returned to the cockpit of the FW47 for a third practice session at the Abu Dhabi Grand Prix and the post-season young drivers' test.

Browning was promoted by Williams to serve as the reserve driver for the 2026 season. He drove the Williams FW48 in FP1 at the Barcelona-Catalunya and Austrian Grands Prix. However, in the former session, he was unable to go out on track due to an electrical problem with the FW48. He made a further free practice appearance at the Italian Grand Prix, and reprised his appearances in the Mexico City and São Paulo Grand Prix

== Other racing ==
=== Formula E ===
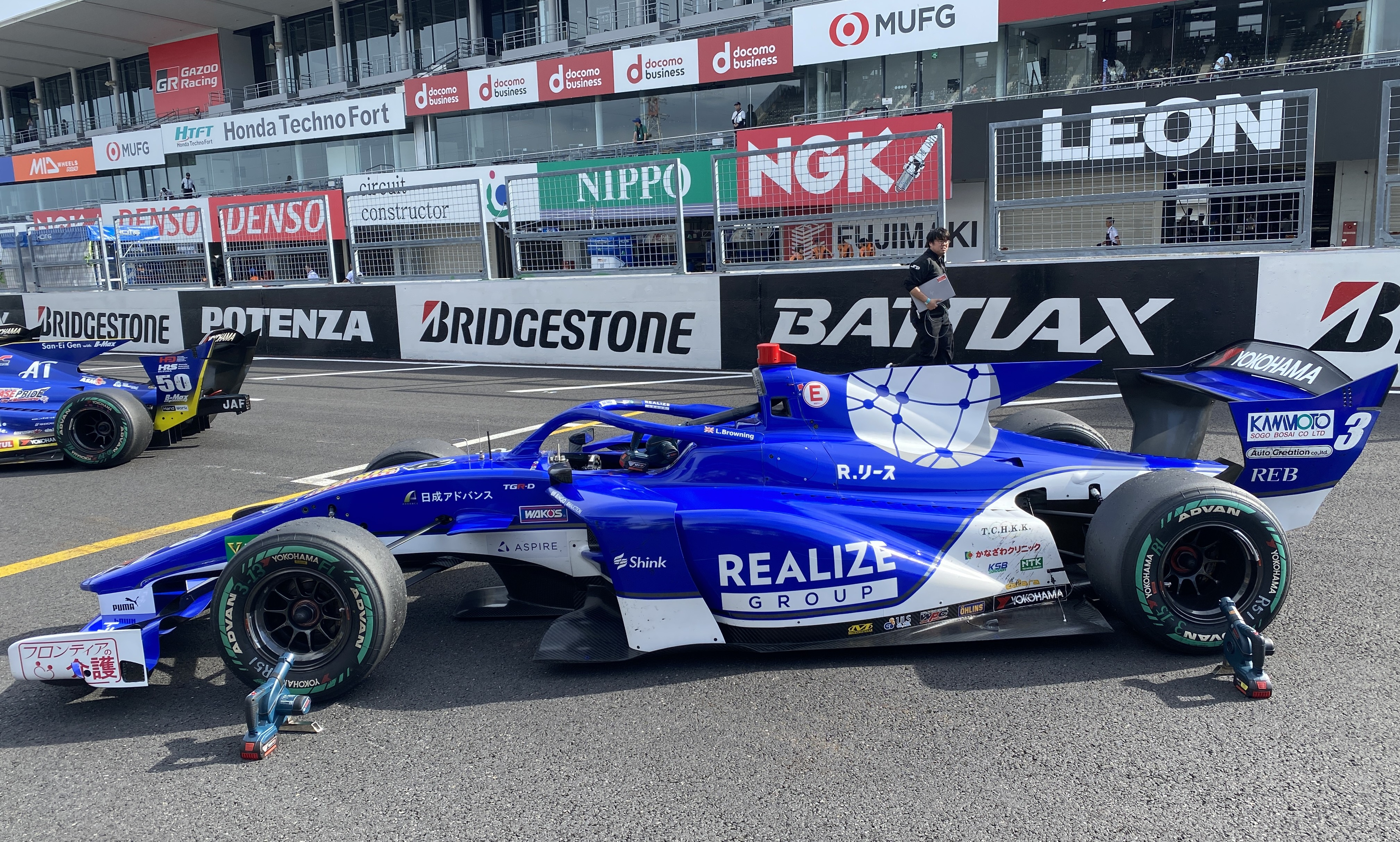
Browning's Dallara SF23 car at Suzuka Circuit in 2026

In 2023, Browning took part in the rookie drivers' test in Berlin with the NEOM McLaren Formula E Team.

=== Super Formula ===
Following the conclusion of his 2025 Formula 2 campaign, Browning took part in a Super Formula test with Kondo Racing.

== Racing record ==
=== Racing career summary ===
Season	Series	Team	Races	Wins	Poles	F/Laps	Podiums	Points	Position
2016	Junior Saloon Car Championship	MADE Motorsport	18	1	1	2	3	116	9th
2017	Ginetta Junior Championship	Richardson Racing	26	0	1	0	0	210	11th
2017	Junior Saloon Car Championship	MADE Motorsport	1	0	0	0	0	1	NC
2018	Ginetta Junior Championship	Richardson Racing	26	8	3	8	18	648	**3rd**
2019	F4 British Championship	Richardson Racing	30	2	2	1	9	268.5	6th
2020	F4 British Championship	Fortec Motorsport	26	7	6	7	16	412.5	**1st**
2021	Italian F4 Championship	US Racing	3	0	0	1	1	27	15th
2021	ADAC Formula 4 Championship	US Racing	18	2	0	2	8	220	**3rd**
2021	Drexler Automotive Formula 4 Cup	US Racing	2	2	2	1	2	50	**3rd**
2021	GB3 Championship	Fortec Motorsports	3	1	0	0	1	35	25th
2022	Formula 4 UAE Championship	Hitech Grand Prix	8	0	0	0	1	64	11th
2022	GB3 Championship	Hitech Grand Prix	24	5	5	8	13	507	**1st**
2023	Formula Regional Middle East Championship	Hitech Grand Prix	6	0	0	0	0	8	26th
2023	FIA Formula 3 Championship	Hitech Pulse-Eight	18	0	0	1	1	41	15th
2023	Macau Grand Prix	Hitech Pulse-Eight	1	1	1	1	1	N/A	**1st**
2024	FIA Formula 3 Championship	Hitech Pulse-Eight	20	2	2	2	3	128	**3rd**
2024	FIA Formula 2 Championship	ART Grand Prix	6	0	0	0	0	6	26th
2024	Formula One	Williams Racing	Test driver						
2025	FIA Formula 2 Championship	Hitech TGR	27	1	1	2	9	162	4th
2025	Formula One	Atlassian Williams Racing	Test driver						
2026	Super Formula	Realize Kondo Racing	10	0	0	0	0	20*	13th*
2026	Formula One	Atlassian Williams F1 Team	Reserve driver						

* Season still in progress.

=== Complete Ginetta Junior Championship results ===
(key) (Races in bold indicate pole position) (Races in italics indicate fastest lap)

Year	Team	1	2	3	4	5	6	7	8	9	10	11	12	13	14	15	16	17	18	19	20	21	22	23	24	25	26	DC	Points
2017	Richardson Racing	BHI; 1; 11	BHI; 2; 16	DON; 1; 10	DON; 2 Ret	DON; 3; 11	THR1; 1; 16	THR1; 2; 11	OUL; 1; 8	OUL; 2; 12	CRO; 1; 14	CRO; 2; 11	CRO; 3; 11	SNE; 1; 9	SNE; 2; 12	SNE; 3; 7	KNO; 1; 11	KNO; 2; 13	ROC; 1; 7	ROC; 2; 8	ROC; 3; 6	SIL; 1 Ret	**SIL**; **2** Ret	SIL; 3; 15	BHGP; 1; 9	BHGP; 2 Ret	BHGP; 3 Ret	11th	222
2018	Richardson Racing	BHI; 1; 5	BHI; 2; 1	DON; 1; 1	DON; 2; 1	**DON**; **3**; 2	THR1; 1; 3	THR1; 2 Ret	OUL; 1 DSQ	**OUL**; **2**; 1	CRO; 1; 19	CRO; 2; 2	CRO; 3; 2	SNE; 1; 1	SNE; 2; 1	**SNE**; **3**; 2	ROC; 1 Ret	**ROC**; **2**; 2	ROC; 3; 1	KNO; 1; 4	KNO; 2; 2	SIL; 1; 3	**SIL**; **2**; 3	SIL; 3; 5	BHGP; 1; 1	BHGP; 2; 4	BHGP; 3; 2	3rd	654

=== Complete F4 British Championship results ===
(key) (Races in bold indicate pole position) (Races in italics indicate fastest lap)

Year	Team	1	2	3	4	5	6	7	8	9	10	11	12	13	14	15	16	17	18	19	20	21	22	23	24	25	26	27	28	29	30	DC	Points
2019	Richardson Racing	BHI; 1; 1	BHI; 2; 3	BHI; 3; 7	DON; 1 DNS	DON; 2; 9	DON; 3; 3	THR1; 1; 1	THR1; 2; 12	THR1; 3; 9	CRO; 1; 12	CRO; 2; 10	CRO; 3; 7	OUL; 1 Ret	OUL; 2; 5	OUL; 3; 4	SNE; 1; 10	SNE; 2; 3	SNE; 3; 13	**THR2**; **1**; 4	THR2; 2; 4	**THR2**; **3**; 9	KNO; 1; 7	KNO; 2; 4	KNO; 3; 4	SIL; 1; 8	SIL; 2; 6	SIL; 3; 3	BHGP; 1; 2	BHGP; 2; 3	BHGP; 3; 2	6th	268.5
2020	Fortec Motorsport	DON; 1; 2	DON; 2; 12	DON; 3; 2	BHGP; 1; 2	BHGP; 2; 4	BHGP; 3; 2	OUL; 1; 1	OUL; 2; 1	**OUL**; **3**; 1	**KNO**; **1**; 1	KNO; 2; 2	**KNO**; **3**; 1	THR; 1; 3	THR; 2; 6	THR; 3; 5	SIL; 1; 4	SIL; 2; 5	SIL; 3; 4	CRO; 1; 6	CRO; 2; 3	**SNE**; **1**; 1	SNE; 2; 4	SNE; 3; 2	**BHI**; **1**; 1	BHI; 2; 2	**BHI**; **3**; 10					1st	412.5

=== Complete Italian F4 Championship results ===
(key) (Races in bold indicate pole position) (Races in italics indicate fastest lap)

Year	Team	1	2	3	4	5	6	7	8	9	10	11	12	13	14	15	16	17	18	19	20	21	DC	Points
2021	US Racing	LEC; 1; 10	LEC; 2; 2	LEC; 3; 6	MIS; 1	MIS; 2	MIS; 3	VLL; 1	VLL; 2	VLL; 3	IMO; 1	IMO; 2	IMO; 3	RBR; 1	RBR; 2	RBR; 3	MUG; 1	MUG; 2	MUG; 3	MNZ; 1	MNZ; 2	MNZ; 3	15th	27

=== Complete ADAC Formula 4 Championship results ===
(key) (Races in bold indicate pole position) (Races in italics indicate fastest lap)

Year	Team	1	2	3	4	5	6	7	8	9	10	11	12	13	14	15	16	17	18	Pos	Points
2021	US Racing	RBR; 1; 7	RBR; 2; 5	RBR; 3; 1	ZAN; 1; 4	ZAN; 2 (9)	ZAN; 3; 6	HOC1; 1; 3	HOC1; 2; 3	HOC1; 3; 6	SAC; 1; 3	SAC; 2; 2	SAC; 3; 7	HOC2; 1; 5	HOC2; 2; 5	HOC2; 3; 1	NÜR; 1 Ret	NÜR; 2; 2	NÜR; 3; 3	3rd	220

=== Complete GB3 Championship results ===
(key) (Races in bold indicate pole position) (Races in italics indicate fastest lap)

Year	Entrant	1	2	3	4	5	6	7	8	9	10	11	12	13	14	15	16	17	18	19	20	21	22	23	24	DC	Points
2021	Fortec Motorsports	BRH; 1	BRH; 2	BRH; 3	SIL1; 1	SIL1; 2	SIL1; 3	DON1; 1	DON1; 2	DON1; 3	SPA; 1	SPA; 2	SPA; 3	SNE; 1	SNE; 2	SNE; 3	SIL2; 1	SIL2; 2	SIL2; 3	OUL; 1 DSQ	OUL; 2; 1	OUL; 3 Ret	DON2; 1	DON2; 2	DON2; 3	25th	35
2022	Hitech Grand Prix	**OUL**; **1**; 1	**OUL**; **2**; 1	OUL; 3 Ret	SIL1; 1; 2	SIL1; 2; 3	SIL1; 3; 17^{1}	DON1; 1 Ret	DON1; 2; 2	DON1; 3; 10^{6}	SNE; 1; 2	**SNE**; **2**; 1	SNE; 3; 15^{5}	**SPA**; **1**; 1	**SPA**; **2**; 1	SPA; 3; 18^{4}	SIL2; 1; 10	SIL2; 2; 11	SIL2; 3; 5^{15}	BRH; 1; 2	BRH; 2; 2	BRH; 3; 9^{7}	DON2; 1; 2	DON2; 2; 2	DON2; 3; 7^{9}	1st	507

=== Complete Formula 4 UAE Championship results ===
(key) (Races in bold indicate pole position) (Races in italics indicate fastest lap)

Year	Team	1	2	3	4	5	6	7	8	9	10	11	12	13	14	15	16	17	18	19	20	DC	Points
2022	Hitech Grand Prix	YAS1; 1	YAS1; 2	YAS1; 3	YAS1; 4	DUB1; 1	DUB1; 2	DUB1; 3	DUB1; 4	DUB2; 1; 12	DUB2; 2; 5	DUB2; 3; 4	DUB2; 4; 5	DUB3; 1; 9	DUB3; 2; 4	DUB3; 3; 2	DUB3; 4 Ret	YAS2; 1	YAS2; 2	YAS2; 3	YAS2; 4	11th	64

=== Complete Formula Regional Middle East Championship results ===
(key) (Races in bold indicate pole position) (Races in italics indicate fastest lap)

Year	Entrant	1	2	3	4	5	6	7	8	9	10	11	12	13	14	15	DC	Points
2023	Hitech Grand Prix	DUB1; 1	DUB1; 2	DUB1; 3	KUW1; 1; 7	KUW1; 2; 9	KUW1; 3; 20	KUW2; 1; 15	KUW2; 2; 14	KUW2; 3 Ret	DUB2; 1	DUB2; 2	DUB2; 3	ABU; 1	ABU; 2	ABU; 3	26th	8

=== Complete FIA Formula 3 Championship results ===
(key) (Races in bold indicate pole position) (Races in italics indicate fastest lap)

Year	Entrant	1	2	3	4	5	6	7	8	9	10	11	12	13	14	15	16	17	18	19	20	DC	Points
2023	Hitech Pulse-Eight	BHR; SPR; Ret	BHR; FEA; 5	MEL; SPR; 17	MEL; FEA; 8	MON; SPR; 8	MON; FEA; 4	CAT; SPR; 2	CAT; FEA; Ret	RBR; SPR; 11	RBR; FEA; 22	SIL; SPR; 14	SIL; FEA; Ret	HUN; SPR; 16	HUN; FEA; 12	SPA; SPR; 8	SPA; FEA; 23	MNZ; SPR; DSQ	MNZ; FEA; 18			15th	41
2024	Hitech Pulse-Eight	BHR; SPR; 15	BHR; FEA; 1	MEL; SPR; 28	MEL; FEA; 4	IMO; SPR; 26†	IMO; FEA; 4	MON; SPR; 8	MON; FEA; 3	CAT; SPR; 12	CAT; FEA; 5	RBR; SPR; 11	**RBR**; **FEA**; 1	SIL; SPR; 24	**SIL**; **FEA**; 8	HUN; SPR; 8	HUN; FEA; 12	SPA; SPR; 12	SPA; FEA; 6	MNZ; SPR; 6	MNZ; FEA; 20	3rd	128

=== Complete FIA Formula 2 Championship results ===
(key) (Races in bold indicate pole position) (Races in italics indicate fastest lap)

Year	Entrant	1	2	3	4	5	6	7	8	9	10	11	12	13	14	15	16	17	18	19	20	21	22	23	24	25	26	27	28	DC	Points
2024	ART Grand Prix	BHR; SPR	BHR; FEA	JED; SPR	JED; FEA	MEL; SPR	MEL; FEA	IMO; SPR	IMO; FEA	MON; SPR	MON; FEA	CAT; SPR	CAT; FEA	RBR; SPR	RBR; FEA	SIL; SPR	SIL; FEA	HUN; SPR	HUN; FEA	SPA; SPR	SPA; FEA	MNZ; SPR	MNZ; FEA	BAK; SPR; 11	BAK; FEA; 7	LSL; SPR; 11	LSL; FEA; 15	YMC; SPR; 6	YMC; FEA; 15	26th	7
2025	Hitech TGR	MEL; SPR; 3	MEL; FEA; C	BHR; SPR; 10	BHR; FEA; 2	JED; SPR; 9	JED; FEA; 6	IMO; SPR; 3	IMO; FEA; 2	MON; SPR; 3	MON; FEA; 4	CAT; SPR; 6	CAT; FEA; 20	RBR; SPR; Ret	RBR; FEA; 5	SIL; SPR; 12	SIL; FEA; 3	SPA; SPR; Ret	SPA; FEA; 3	HUN; SPR; 12	HUN; FEA; 4	MNZ; SPR; 8	**MNZ**; **FEA**; 1	BAK; SPR; 2	BAK; FEA; 19	LSL; SPR; 17	LSL; FEA; 10	YMC; SPR; 20	YMC; FEA; 14	4th	162

=== Complete Macau Grand Prix results ===
Year	Team	Car	Qualifying	Quali Race	Main race
2023	(United Kingdom) Hitech Pulse-Eight	Dallara F3 2019	**1st**	**1st**	**1st**

=== Complete Formula One participations ===
(key) (Races in bold indicate pole position) (Races in italics indicate fastest lap)

Year	Entrant	Chassis	Engine	1	2	3	4	5	6	7	8	9	10	11	12	13	14	15	16	17	18	19	20	21	22	23	24	WDC	Points
2024	Williams Racing	Williams FW46	Mercedes-AMG F1 M15 E Performance 1.6 V6 t	BHR	SAU	AUS	JPN	CHN	MIA	EMI	MON	CAN	ESP	AUT	GBR	HUN	BEL	NED	ITA	AZE	SIN	USA	MXC	SAP	LVG	QAT	ABU; TD	–	–
2025	Atlassian Williams Racing	Williams FW47	Mercedes-AMG F1 M16 V6 t	AUS	CHN	JPN	BHR; TD	SAU	MIA	EMI	MON	ESP	CAN	AUT	GBR	BEL	HUN	NED	ITA	AZE	SIN	USA	MXC; TD	SAP	LVG	QAT	ABU; TD	–	–
2026	Atlassian Williams Racing	Williams FW48	Mercedes-AMG F1 M17 V6 t	AUS	CHN	JPN	MIA	CAN	MON	BCN; TNP (Note: Browning was entered into the first practice session but completed no running due to an electrical failure on his car.)	AUT; TD	GBR	BEL	HUN	NED	ITA; TD	ESP	AZE	BHR	SIN	USA	MXC; TD	SAP; TD	LVG	QAT	ABU		–	–

=== Complete Super Formula results ===
Year	Team	Engine	1	2	3	4	5	6	7	8	9	10	11	12	DC	Points
2026	Realize Kondo Racing	Toyota	MOT; 20	MOT; 4	SUZ1; 4	SUZ1; 14	FUJ1; 8^{3}	FUJ1; 10	FUJ1; 17	SUG; 11	FUJ2; 14	FUJ2; Ret	SUZ2	SUZ2	13th*	20*

^{*} Season still in progress.

== Notes ==
Sporting positions
Preceded by Zane Maloney	F4 British Championship; Champion; 2020	Succeeded by Matthew Rees
Preceded by Zak O'Sullivan	GB3 Championship; Champion; 2022	Succeeded by Callum Voisin
Preceded by Andy Chang	Macau Grand Prix; Winner; 2023	Succeeded by Ugo Ugochukwu
Awards and achievements
Preceded by Zak O'Sullivan	Aston Martin Autosport BRDC Award; 2022	Succeeded by Joseph Loake
