= 2022 GB3 Championship =

Motor racing championship

The 2022 GB3 Championship was a motor racing championship for open wheel, formula racing cars held across England and Belgium. The 2022 season was the seventh organised by the British Racing Drivers' Club in the United Kingdom, and the second season under the GB3 moniker after rebranding from the BRDC British Formula 3 Championship in mid-2021. The championship featured a mix of professional motor racing teams and privately funded drivers. For the 2022 season, a new updated chassis and engine pack were introduced. The season was run over eight triple-header rounds.

Luke Browning took the drivers' championship at the final round at Donington Park, with his team, Hitech Grand Prix, taking their first teams' title.

== Teams and drivers ==
All teams were British-registered.

Team	No.	Driver	Rounds
Hitech Grand Prix	4	(United States) Bryce Aron	All
Hitech Grand Prix	5	(United Kingdom) Luke Browning	All
Hitech Grand Prix	6	(United Kingdom) Cian Shields	All
Carlin	7	(Brazil) Roberto Faria	All
Carlin	31	(Spain) Javier Sagrera	All
Carlin	35	(United Kingdom) Callum Voisin	All
Chris Dittmann Racing	8	(United Kingdom) McKenzy Cresswell	All
Chris Dittmann Racing	12	(United States) Ayrton Ori	6
Chris Dittmann Racing	21	(United Kingdom) Zak Taylor	7–8
Chris Dittmann Racing	68	(United Kingdom) Branden Lee Oxley	1–7
Douglas Motorsport	11	(Australia) Marcos Flack	1, 3–7
Douglas Motorsport	16	(Australia) Thomas Smith	All
Douglas Motorsport	42	(United States) Max Esterson	All
Elite Motorsport	17	(Japan) Ayato Iwasaki	8
Elite Motorsport	27	(United Kingdom) John Bennett	All
Elite Motorsport	34	(United Kingdom) Tom Lebbon	All
Elite Motorsport	67	(United Kingdom) James Hedley	1–4
Fortec Motorsport	21	(United Kingdom) Zak Taylor	1–6
Fortec Motorsport	43	(Denmark) Mikkel Grundtvig	All
Fortec Motorsport	50	(Sweden) Joel Granfors	All
Arden Motorsport	22	(Canada) Nico Christodoulou	3–8
Arden Motorsport	32	(United Kingdom) Alex Connor	All
Arden Motorsport	77	(United States) David Morales	All
JHR Developments	53	(United Kingdom) Matthew Rees	All
JHR Developments	67	(United Kingdom) James Hedley	5–8
Hillspeed	64	(Canada) Nick Gilkes	All

== Race calendar and results ==
The provisional calendar was announced on 22 October 2021. The championship supported the British GT championship at seven of its eight meetings.

Round		Circuit	Date	Pole position	Fastest lap	Winning driver	Winning team
1	R1	Oulton Park (International Circuit, Cheshire)	16 April	(United Kingdom) Luke Browning	(United Kingdom) Luke Browning	(United Kingdom) Luke Browning	Hitech Grand Prix
1	R2	Oulton Park (International Circuit, Cheshire)	18 April	(United Kingdom) Luke Browning	(United Kingdom) Luke Browning	(United Kingdom) Luke Browning	Hitech Grand Prix
1	R3	Oulton Park (International Circuit, Cheshire)	18 April		(United States) David Morales	(Denmark) Mikkel Grundtvig	Fortec Motorsports
2	R4	Silverstone Circuit (Grand Prix Circuit, Northamptonshire)	7 May	(Sweden) Joel Granfors	(United Kingdom) Luke Browning	(Sweden) Joel Granfors	Fortec Motorsports
2	R5	Silverstone Circuit (Grand Prix Circuit, Northamptonshire)	8 May	(Sweden) Joel Granfors	(United Kingdom) Luke Browning	(United Kingdom) Tom Lebbon	Elite Motorsport
2	R6	Silverstone Circuit (Grand Prix Circuit, Northamptonshire)	8 May		(United Kingdom) Callum Voisin	(United Kingdom) Cian Shields	Hitech Grand Prix
3	R7	Donington Park (Grand Prix Circuit, Leicestershire)	28 May	(Sweden) Joel Granfors	(United States) Max Esterson	(United Kingdom) Callum Voisin	Carlin
3	R8	Donington Park (Grand Prix Circuit, Leicestershire)	29 May	(United States) Max Esterson	(United States) Max Esterson	(United States) Max Esterson	Douglas Motorsport
3	R9	Donington Park (Grand Prix Circuit, Leicestershire)	29 May		(Brazil) Roberto Faria	(United States) Bryce Aron	Hitech Grand Prix
4	R10	Snetterton Circuit (300 Circuit, Norfolk)	25 June	(United Kingdom) Callum Voisin	(Brazil) Roberto Faria	(United Kingdom) Callum Voisin	Carlin
4	R11	Snetterton Circuit (300 Circuit, Norfolk)	26 June	(United Kingdom) Luke Browning	(Spain) Javier Sagrera	(United Kingdom) Luke Browning	Hitech Grand Prix
4	R12	Snetterton Circuit (300 Circuit, Norfolk)	26 June		(Brazil) Roberto Faria	(Denmark) Mikkel Grundtvig	Fortec Motorsports
5	R13	Circuit de Spa-Francorchamps (Spa, Belgium)	23 July	(United Kingdom) Luke Browning	(United Kingdom) Luke Browning	(United Kingdom) Luke Browning	Hitech Grand Prix
5	R14	Circuit de Spa-Francorchamps (Spa, Belgium)	23 July	(United Kingdom) Luke Browning	(United Kingdom) Luke Browning	(United Kingdom) Luke Browning	Hitech Grand Prix
5	R15	Circuit de Spa-Francorchamps (Spa, Belgium)	24 July		(United Kingdom) Callum Voisin	(Australia) Tommy Smith	Douglas Motorsport
6	R16	Silverstone Circuit (Grand Prix Circuit, Northamptonshire)	30 July	(United Kingdom) Callum Voisin	(United Kingdom) Callum Voisin	(Sweden) Joel Granfors	Fortec Motorsports
6	R17	Silverstone Circuit (Grand Prix Circuit, Northamptonshire)	31 July	(United Kingdom) Callum Voisin	(United Kingdom) Callum Voisin	(United Kingdom) Tom Lebbon	Elite Motorsport
6	R18	Silverstone Circuit (Grand Prix Circuit, Northamptonshire)	31 July		(Canada) Nico Christodoulou	(Australia) Marcos Flack	Douglas Motorsport
7	R19	Brands Hatch (Grand Prix Circuit, Kent)	10 September	(United Kingdom) Matthew Rees	(United Kingdom) Luke Browning	(United Kingdom) Matthew Rees	JHR Developments
7	R20	Brands Hatch (Grand Prix Circuit, Kent)	11 September	(United Kingdom) Tom Lebbon	(United Kingdom) Matthew Rees	(United Kingdom) Tom Lebbon	Elite Motorsport
7	R21	Brands Hatch (Grand Prix Circuit, Kent)	11 September		(United Kingdom) Luke Browning	(United Kingdom) Branden Lee Oxley	Chris Dittmann Racing
8	R22	Donington Park (Grand Prix Circuit, Leicestershire)	15 October	(United Kingdom) Callum Voisin	(United Kingdom) Tom Lebbon	(United Kingdom) Callum Voisin	Carlin
8	R23	Donington Park (Grand Prix Circuit, Leicestershire)	16 October	(United Kingdom) Callum Voisin	(United Kingdom) Matthew Rees	(United Kingdom) Tom Lebbon	Elite Motorsport
8	R24	Donington Park (Grand Prix Circuit, Leicestershire)	16 October		(Canada) Nico Christodoulou	(Canada) Nick Gilkes	Hillspeed

== Season report ==
=== First half ===
The 2022 GB3 Championship began over the traditional Easter Weekend at Oulton Park with a double pole for Luke Browning. He was unchallenged in the first race and won ahead of Roberto Faria and Matthew Rees, who also retained their starting spots. Incidents behind them ended Javier Sagrera's race. The second race offered much the same picture, with Browning converting his second pole into another comfortable victory. Faria meanwhile had to overtake Joel Granfors at the start to get another second place, with Granfors then coming third. The reverse-grid race three saw Mikkel Grundtvig start from pole, resisting attacks from Tommy Smith behind him to win the race. David Morales completed the podium. Browning retired after contact, but his two wins still meant he led the championship after round one, ten points ahead of Faria.

Next up was the first visit to Silverstone Circuit, and this time it was two poles for Granfors. Browning took second from Tom Lebbon at the start of race one and started to go after Granfors, but the latter was able to keep ahead and score his maiden GB3 win. In race two, roles were reversed, as this time Lebbon was the one making the move at the start, passing Granfors for the race lead into Maggotts. Browning came third this time around. Morales was the polesitter for race three, but dropped down to third at the start. The new leading duo of Cian Shields and Nick Gilkes battled all race, with Shields eventually coming out ahead to win. Bryce Aron also overtook Morales to complete the podium. Granfors' two podiums and eleven places gained in race three promoted him to the championship lead, three points ahead of Browning.

The third round was held at Donington Park, where Granfors and Max Esterson shared poles. The first race started with chaos, as championship leader Granfors retired from contact and his closest rival also crashed while trying to avoid the stricken Granfors. Callum Voisin inherited the lead and held it until the end to win ahead of Faria and Esterson. Race two was not much calmer, with Esterson defending from Voisin who had to take to the grass to avoid contact, dropping behind Granfors and Browning in the process. The reversed-grid race was the most straightforward: Aron converted his pole into a win, while Branden Lee Oxley converted third to second by passing Grundvig at the start. With both championship leaders first retiring, then on the podium and having a similar race three, the gap at the top closed up to a single point.

The first half of the season came to a close at Snetterton Circuit, with Voisin and Browning winning in qualifying. Voisin held the lead of race one as Granfors' poor start forced him to concede second to Browning. The latter then came close to gaining the lead several times, but could not do so. The second race began with a three-wide moment between Browning, Granfors and Rees. The latter had to back out and lost third to Sagrera. The top two battled all race, but Browning held on to win the race. Grundtvig was once again on reverse grid pole, next to Shields, who had an overheating issue that saw him drop back and retire. Zak Taylor took second, but also soon made a mistake fighting and dropped down. This promoted Marcos Flack and James Hedley to the podium. Browning beat Granfors in all three races and took the championship lead.

=== Second half ===
The only continental round of the season at Spa-Francorchamps came next, and Browning took both pole positions. He lost the lead to Granfors down the Kemmel straight, but a safety car for a three-car crash was called straight away. Browning retook the lead at the restart and never looked back, with Granfors in second. Shields came third, before a penalty gave that podium to Oxley. Race two saw Browning drop again, this time to third behind Oxley and Granfors. The latter then went for the lead, forcing Oxley out into the gravel, before Browning repeated his move for the win once again. Race three was disrupted by a red flag following a hefty crash by Morales. Only three racing laps were completed. Half points were awarded for the race won by Voisin ahead of Smith and Faria. Browning's two wins extended his championship gap to 25.5 points.

The second Silverstone event began with Browning getting excluded from qualifying for a technical infringement. Voisin started race one from pole, before losing out to Granfors and Sagrera. He re-passed Sagrera later, but it was too late to close up to Granfors, as Faria then got by Sagrera for third. Race two saw Voisin drop from pole to fourth, behind Lebbon, Granfors and Sagrera. Voisin spent the rest of the race trying to make up for his start, climbing up to second place. Lebbon was later disqualified, but this decision was overturned in the end. Debutant Ayrton Ori started race three from pole, but could not hold on to the lead. A tumultuous race saw multiple drivers rise up the grid, with Flack winning in the end. Brownings exclusion meant he could not fight at the front, while Granfors' three podiums saw him take the championship lead.

Brands Hatch hosted the penultimate round of the year, and Rees and Lebbon shared honors in qualifying. Rees led the first race from start to finish, while behind him Granfors slipped back to fourth, behind Browning and John Bennett. He later repassed Bennett, but was not able to match Browning. Race two saw Lebbon defend from Rees at the start. Slight contact between the two saw Rees drop behind Browning, who had overtaken Granfors for third earlier on. Race three saw a red flag when Voisin and Esterson hit the barriers. Oxley restarted from pole as Flack was sent to the back for a jump start, and won ahead of Shields and Faria. The championship lead changed hands once again after the round, with Browning once again beating his rival in all three races and coming out 15.5 points ahead.

The season finale was held at Donington Park. Voisin picked up two poles in qualifying and led the first race from start to finish. Behind him, Browning started fifth and was able to climb to third, before Lebbon in second got a penalty that promoted Browning and Bennett up a place. Race two started on a slightly damp track, with the field split on tire choice. Voisin had a bad start and dropped to third, letting Granfors into the lead, before the latter got dispatched by Lebbon. When the track got drier, Granfors lost pace and dropped down the field. Aron was the big winner, running on dry tires and climbing up to third place at the end, behind Browning, whose second place earned him the championship title. Race three saw Gilkes take his maiden victory in a lights-to-flag run ahead of Shields and Connor, while Hitech passed Carlin to win the teams' title.

== Championship standings ==
Scoring system

Points were awarded to the top 20 classified finishers in races one and two, with the third race awarding points to only the top 15. Race three, which had its grid formed by reversing the qualifying order, awarded extra points for positions gained from the drivers' respective starting positions.

Races	Position, points per race																			
Races	1st	2nd	3rd	4th	5th	6th	7th	8th	9th	10th	11th	12th	13th	14th	15th	16th	17th	18th	19th	20th
Races 1 & 2	35	29	24	21	19	17	15	13	12	11	10	9	8	7	6	5	4	3	2	1
Race 3	20	17	15	13	11	10	9	8	7	6	5	4	3	2	1					

Notes

- ^{1} ^{2} ^{3} refers to positions gained and thus extra points earned during race three.

=== Drivers' championship ===
Pos	Driver	OUL			SIL1			DON1			SNE			SPA			SIL2			BRH			DON2			Pts
Pos	Driver	R1	R2	R3	R1	R2	R3	R1	R2	R3	R1	R2	R3	R1	R2	R3 (Note: Race three at Spa had only three racing laps completed. Half points were awarded.)	R1	R2	R3	R1	R2	R3	R1	R2	R3	Pts
1	(United Kingdom) Luke Browning	**1**	**1**	Ret	2	3	17^{1}	Ret	2	9^{7}	2	**1**	14^{6}	**1**	**1**	18^{4}	10	11	5^{15}	2	2	9^{7}	2	2	7^{9}	507
2	(Sweden) Joel Granfors	6	3	15^{3}	**1**	**2**	9^{11}	**Ret**	3	10^{11}	3	2	15^{6}	2	4	16^{5}	1	3	3^{15}	3	4	19	5	13	5^{8}	460.5
3	(United Kingdom) Tom Lebbon	14	6	DSQ	3	1	13^{6}	5	8	13	5	5	19	6	Ret	12^{1}	6	1	13^{3}	6	**1**	18	4	1	12^{7}	363.5
4	(United Kingdom) Callum Voisin	20	9	13^{2}	10	5	8^{3}	1	7	6^{13}	**1**	Ret	17^{5}	8	10	2^{3}	**2**	**2**	4^{15}	9	13	Ret	**1**	**9**	Ret	359
5	(Brazil) Roberto Faria	2	2	14^{3}	7	6	Ret	2	5	20	4	7	13^{5}	11	Ret	4	3	5	2^{11}	18	9	3^{1}	Ret	14	15	316.5
6	(United Kingdom) Matthew Rees	3	4	16	12	8	Ret	8	6	7^{13}	Ret	4	12^{7}	DSQ	7	15	8	6	6^{6}	**1**	3	13^{2}	17	6	9^{6}	310.5
7	(United States) Max Esterson	19	11	8^{1}	4	4	10^{5}	3	**1**	11^{7}	10	10	7^{5}	4	2	17^{3}	9	10	Ret	10	18	Ret	11	8	18	292.5
8	(United Kingdom) John Bennett	5	5	9^{2}	6	9	11^{2}	17	13	4^{3}	6	11	16	17	5	11	5	8	Ret	4	6	14	3	Ret	16^{1}	262.5
9	(Spain) Javier Sagrera	Ret	8	11^{1}	Ret	11	5^{5}	Ret	10	18	7	3	9^{5}	5	8	8^{7}	4	4	11^{6}	Ret	8	5^{2}	7	16	11^{3}	257.5
10	(United Kingdom) Alex Connor	15	13	18^{2}	11	10	7^{1}	4	9	8^{9}	8	6	11^{5}	19	12	6^{3}	13	9	Ret	7	5	8	10	18	3^{2}	252.5
11	(United Kingdom) McKenzy Cresswell	4	7	10^{3}	9	Ret	6^{6}	7	12	16	9	16	5^{4}	18	3	20	11	Ret	DNS	16	12	7	Ret	4	8^{1}	221
12	(United States) Bryce Aron	12	15	17^{4}	19	12	3^{3}	12	19	1	11	13	DSQ	9	14	21	16	Ret	14^{7}	8	7	10^{1}	6	3	13^{5}	215
13	(United Kingdom) Cian Shields	11	Ret	7	16	18	1^{1}	14	15	19	14	19	Ret	7	9	13^{6}	17	15	15^{7}	21	19	2	12	5	2^{1}	186.5
14	(Canada) Nick Gilkes	16	18	4	17	17	2^{2}	Ret	18	12^{10}	DNS	12	18	12	11	5^{2}	14	12	16	19	17	6	13	15	1	165.5
15	(United Kingdom) Branden Lee Oxley	8	Ret	5^{2}	8	14	14	10	20	2^{1}	12	9	Ret	3	Ret	19	12	DSQ	12	15	22	1				163
16	(Canada) Nico Christodoulou							Ret	11	15	13	8	10^{3}	Ret	15	10	7	7	18	5	10	11^{2}	9	7	4^{4}	163
17	(United Kingdom) James Hedley	13	10	12	5	7	18	6	4	14	16	14	3^{2}	Ret	13	14	15	DSQ	Ret	11	16	Ret	WD	WD	WD	156
18	(United Kingdom) Zak Taylor	7	12	6	13	15	16	9	16	DSQ	Ret	17	6	16	18	3	19	Ret	10	14	15	4	8	10	14	154.5
19	(Australia) Tommy Smith	17	17	2	14	16	12	13	21	5	Ret	18	4^{2}	14	19	1^{1}	21	16	7	13	11	17	14	Ret	17	136.5
20	(Australia) Marcos Flack	9	14	19				11	14	17	15	15	2^{2}	10	6	9	22	13	1^{5}	17	20	16^{3}				136.5
21	(Denmark) Mikkel Grundtvig	18	19	1	15	13	15	16	17	3	17	20	1	15	17	7	20	17	8	20	21	15^{3}	15	17	19	135.5
22	(United States) David Morales	10	16	3^{1}	18	19	4	15	22	Ret	Ret	21	8	13	16	Ret	18	14	9	12	14	12	Ret	11	10	130
23	(Japan) Ayato Iwasaki																						16	12	6	24
24	(United States) Ayrton Ori																23	18	17							3
Pos	Driver	R1	R2	R3	R1	R2	R3	R1	R2	R3	R1	R2	R3	R1	R2	R3	R1	R2	R3	R1	R2	R3	R1	R2	R3	Pts
Pos	Driver	OUL			SIL1			DON1			SNE			SPA			SIL2			BRH			DON2			Pts

Colour	Result
Gold	Winner
Silver	Second place
Bronze	Third place
Green	Points classification
Blue	Non-points classification
Blue	Non-classified finish (NC)
Purple	Retired, not classified (Ret)
Red	Did not qualify (DNQ)
Red	Did not pre-qualify (DNPQ)
Black	Disqualified (DSQ)
White	Did not start (DNS)
White	Withdrew (WD)
White	Race cancelled (C)
Blank	Did not practice (DNP)
Blank	Did not arrive (DNA)
Blank	Excluded (EX)

**Bold** – Pole

Italics – Fastest Lap

=== Teams' championship ===
Each team counted its two best results of every race.

Pos	Team	OUL			SIL1			DON1			SNE			SPA			SIL2			BRH			DON2			Pts
Pos	Team	R1	R2	R3	R1	R2	R3	R1	R2	R3	R1	R2	R3	R1	R2	R3	R1	R2	R3	R1	R2	R3	R1	R2	R3	Pts
1	Hitech Grand Prix	1	1	7	2	3	1^{1}	12	2	1	2	1	6^{2}	1	1	11^{11}	10	9	5^{15}	2	2	2	2	2	2^{1}	805.5
1	Hitech Grand Prix	11	15	17^{4}	16	12	3^{3}	14	15	10^{6}	11	13	15^{5}	7	9	15^{3}	16	12	14^{7}	8	7	9^{7}	6	3	7^{9}	805.5
2	Carlin	2	2	11^{1}	7	5	5^{5}	1	5	7^{12}	1	3	10^{4}	6	8	1^{4}	2	1	2^{11}	9	8	3^{1}	1	9	11^{3}	794.5
2	Carlin	20	8	13^{2}	10	6	8^{3}	2	7	19	4	7	14^{4}	8	10	3	3	3	4^{15}	18	9	5^{2}	7	14	15	794.5
3	Elite Motorsport	5	5	9^{2}	3	1	13^{6}	5	4	4^{3}	5	5	3^{2}	5	5	13	5	6	13^{3}	4	1	14	3	1	6	697
3	Elite Motorsport	13	6	12	5	7	11^{2}	6	8	14	6	11	17	18	Ret	17	6	DSQ	Ret	6	6	18	4	12	12^{7}	697
4	Fortec Motorsport	6	3	1	1	2	9^{11}	8	3	3	3	2	1	2	4	4	1	2	3^{15}	3	4	15^{3}	5	13	5^{8}	648
4	Fortec Motorsport	7	12	6	13	13	15	16	16	11^{10}	17	17	7	16	17	12^{9}	19	14	8	20	21	19	15	17	19	648
5	Douglas Motorsport	9	11	2	4	4	10^{5}	3	1	6	10	10	2^{2}	4	2	9^{11}	9	8	1^{5}	10	11	16^{3}	11	8	17	514
5	Douglas Motorsport	17	14	8^{1}	14	16	12	13	14	12^{6}	15	15	4^{2}	10	6	2	21	10	7	13	18	17	14	Ret	18	514
6	Arden Motorsport	10	13	3^{1}	11	10	4	4	9	9^{8}	8	6	12^{4}	14	12	6^{3}	7	5	9	5	5	8	10	7	3^{2}	493.5
6	Arden Motorsport	15	16	19^{1}	18	19	7^{1}	15	11	16	13	8	9	20	15	19	13	7	18	7	10	11^{2}	Ret	11	4^{4}	493.5
7	Chris Dittmann Racing	4	7	5^{2}	8	14	6^{6}	7	12	2^{1}	9	9	5^{4}	3	3	10^{6}	11	15	12	14	12	1	8	4	8^{1}	423
7	Chris Dittmann Racing	8	Ret	10^{3}	9	Ret	14	10	20	17	12	16	Ret	19	Ret	16^{1}	12	Ret	17	15	15	4	Ret	10	14	423
8	JHR Developments	3	4	17	12	8	Ret	9	6	8^{12}	Ret	4	13^{6}	11	7	8^{6}	8	4	6^{6}	1	3	13^{2}	17	6	9^{6}	374.5
8	JHR Developments													Ret	13	14	15	DSQ	Ret	11	16	DNS	WD	WD	WD	374.5
9	Hillspeed	16	18	4	17	17	2^{2}	Ret	18	13^{9}	DNS	12	18	12	11	5^{2}	14	12	16	19	17	6	13	15	1	165.5
Pos	Team	R1	R2	R3	R1	R2	R3	R1	R2	R3	R1	R2	R3	R1	R2	R3	R1	R2	R3	R1	R2	R3	R1	R2	R3	Pts
Pos	Team	OUL			SIL1			DON1			SNE			SPA			SIL2			BRH			DON2			Pts
