= Joel Granfors =

Swedish racing driver (born 2005)

- Nationality: (Sweden) Swedish
- Born: 24 June 2005 (age 21) Eskilstuna, Sweden
- Relatives: Linus Granfors (brother)

USF Pro 2000 Championship career
- Debut season: 2023
- Current team: Exclusive Autosport
- Categorisation: FIA Silver
- Car number: 92
- Starts: 4 (4 entries)
- Wins: 1
- Podiums: 2
- Fastest laps: 1
- Best finish: TBA in 2023

Previous series
- 2021 2021 2020 2020, 2019: F4 British Championship; Aquila Formula 1000; Formula Nordic; Aquila Synergy Cup Sweden

Championship titles
- 2020 2020: Formula Nordic; Aquila Synergy Cup Sweden

Joel Paul Granfors (born 24 June 2005), is a Swedish racing driver who most recently competed in the 2023 USF Pro 2000 Championship with Exclusive Autosport. He previously raced in the 2022 GB3 Championship with Fortec Motorsport, taking the runners-up position.

== Career ==
=== Karting ===
Granfors began karting in 2013, in Sweden. Highlights of his seven-year karting career include winning the 2017 MKR Series Sweden in the Junior 60 category, the 2018 SverigeCupen in the OK Junior category, and finishing sixth in the OK Junior category of the 2018 Swedish Karting Championship. He competed in the CIK-FIA Karting European Championship in 2019.

=== Aquila Synergy Cup Sweden ===
Granfors made his car racing debut in the 2019 Aquila Synergy Cup Sweden, where he finished fifth in the standings with five wins and eight podiums.

Granfors continued in the championship in 2020, racing with his family team Granforce Racing alongside his younger brother Linus. With nine wins and eleven podiums, he won the title.

=== Formula Nordic ===
Granfors competed in the 2020 Formula Nordic Championship with his family team Granforce Racing, where he won the title with eight wins and nine podiums.

=== Aquila Formula 1000 ===
Granfors competed in the Kinnekulle Ring round of the 2021 Aquila Formula 1000 Championship, driving for Granforce Racing alongside his father Joakim and his brother Linus.

=== F4 British Championship ===
Granfors competed in the 2021 F4 British Championship with Fortec Motorsport. He finished fourth in the standings with one win.

=== GB3 Championship ===
Granfors moved to the GB3 Championship in 2022, continuing with Fortec Motorsport. He took his maiden victory in the championship in the second round at the Silverstone Circuit.

=== FIA Formula 3 ===
In September 2022, Granfors took part in FIA Formula 3 Championship post-season testing at Jerez, taking part in all three days of the test with the Carlin team.

=== USF Pro 2000 Championship ===
For 2023, Granfors moved to America to compete in the 2023 USF Pro 2000 Championship with Exclusive Autosport.

== Personal life ==
Granfors' younger brother Linus, is also a racing driver, as well as his father Joakim, who also manages the family team, Granforce Racing.

== Karting record ==
=== Karting career summary ===
Season	Series	Team	Position
2013	MKR Series Sweden - Cadet	Katrineholms MK	N/A
2014	MKR Series Sweden - Formula Micro		13th
2015	MKR Series Sweden - Formula Micro		3rd
2015	Juniorfestivalen - Formula Micro		5th
2016	Swedish Karting Championship - Junior 60	GDS Competition	12th
2016	Göteborgs Stora Pris - Junior 60		13th
2016	MKR Series Sweden - Junior 60		5th
2017	Swedish Karting Championship - Invitational - Junior 60		7th
2017	MKR Series Sweden - Junior 60	Katrineholms MK	1st
2017	Raket Cup Sweden - Mini		41st
2017	22° South Garda Winter Cup - Mini ROK		29th
2018	Swedish Karting Championship - OK Junior		6th
2018	SverigeCupen - OK Junior		1st
2019	FIA Karting European Championship - OK Junior	Ward Racing	N/A
2019	WSK Super Master Series - OK Junior	Ward Racing	37th
2019	24° South Garda Winter Cup - OK Junior		N/A

== Racing record ==
=== Racing career summary ===
Season	Series	Team	Races	Wins	Poles	F/Laps	Podiums	Points	Position
2019	Aquila Synergy Cup Sweden		14	5	2	5	8	340	5th
2020	Formula Nordic	Granforce Racing	12	8	2	7	9	264	**1st**
2020	Aquila Synergy Cup Sweden	Granforce Racing	12	9	2	3	11	284	**1st**
2021	Aquila Formula 1000	Granforce Racing	1	0	1	1	1	45	15th
2021	F4 British Championship	Fortec Motorsport	29	1	0	4	8	240	4th
2022	GB3 Championship	Fortec Motorsport	24	2	3	0	11	460.5	**2nd**
2022	Aquila Formula 1000 Sweden	Granforce Racing	15	12	3	9	14	477	**2nd**
2023	USF Pro 2000 Championship	Exclusive Autosport	13	1	0	1	3	206	10th
2025	Le Mans Cup - LMP3	R-ace GP	2	0	0	0	0	14	15th

* Season still in progress.

=== Complete Formula Nordic results ===
(key) (Races in bold indicate pole position) (Races in italics indicate fastest lap)

Year	Team	1	2	3	4	5	6	7	8	9	10	11	12	13	14	15	16	DC	Points
2020	Granforce Racing	FAL; 1	FAL; 2	FAL; 3	**KAR**; **1**; 1	KAR; 2; 1	KAR; 3; 3	SKE; 1; 1	SKE; 2; 1	SKE; 3; 1	AND; 1 DNS	AND; 2; 4	AND; 3; 1	**MAN**; **1**; 1	MAN; 2; 7	KNU; 1; 1	KNU; 2; 4	1st	264

=== Complete F4 British Championship results ===
(key) (Races in bold indicate pole position) (Races in italics indicate fastest lap)

Year	Team	1	2	3	4	5	6	7	8	9	10	11	12	13	14	15	16	17	18	19	20	21	22	23	24	25	26	27	28	29	30	DC	Points
2021	Fortec Motorsport	THR1; 1; 2	THR1; 2; 2	THR1; 3; 8	SNE; 1; 8	SNE; 2; 5	SNE; 3 Ret	BHI; 1; 8^{3}	BHI; 2; 8	BHI; 3; 6	OUL; 1; 11	OUL; 2; 5^{3}	OUL; 3; 10	KNO; 1; 2	KNO; 2 Ret	KNO; 3; 2	THR2; 1; 7	THR2; 2; 1^{9}	THR2; 3; 3	CRO; 1; 2	CRO; 2; 8^{6}	CRO; 3; 4	SIL; 1; 4	SIL; 2 Ret	SIL; 3 Ret	DON; 1; 8	DON; 2; 8^{4}	DON; 3; 3	BHGP; 1; 4	BHGP; 2 Ret	BHGP; 3 WD	4th	240

=== Complete GB3 Championship results ===
(key) (Races in bold indicate pole position) (Races in italics indicate fastest lap)

Year	Team	1	2	3	4	5	6	7	8	9	10	11	12	13	14	15	16	17	18	19	20	21	22	23	24	DC	Points
2022	Fortec Motorsport	OUL; 1; 6	OUL; 2; 3	OUL; 3; 15^{3}	**SIL1**; **1**; 1	**SIL1**; **2**; 2	SIL1; 3; 9^{11}	**DON1**; **1** Ret	DON1; 2; 3	DON1; 3; 11^{10}	SNE; 1; 3	SNE; 2; 2	SNE; 3; 16^{5}	SPA; 1; 2	SPA; 2; 2	SPA; 3; 16^{5}	SIL2; 1; 1	SIL2; 2; 3	SIL2; 3; 3^{15}	BRH; 1; 3	BRH; 2; 4	BRH; 3; 19	DON2; 1; 5	DON2; 2; 13	DON2; 3; 5^{8}	2nd	460.5

=== Complete Le Mans Cup results ===
(key) (Races in bold indicate pole position; results in italics indicate fastest lap)

Year	Entrant	Class	Chassis	1	2	3	4	5	6	7	Rank	Points
2025	R-ace GP	LMP3	Duqueine D09	CAT; 6	LEC; 7	LMS; 1	LMS; 2	SPA	SIL	ALG	15th	14

^{*} Season still in progress.

=== American open-wheel racing results ===
==== USF Pro 2000 Championship ====
(key) (Races in bold indicate pole position) (Races in italics indicate fastest lap) (Races with * indicate most race laps led)

Year	Team	1	2	3	4	5	6	7	8	9	10	11	12	13	14	15	16	17	18	Rank	Points
2023	Exclusive Autosport	STP; 1; 9	STP; 2; 8	SEB; 1; 2	SEB; 2; 9	IMS; 1 Ret	IMS; 2; 1	IRP; 2	ROA; 1; 15	ROA; 2; 6	MOH; 1; 4	MOH; 2; 9	TOR; 1; 4	TOR; 2; 19	COTA; 1	COTA; 1	POR; 1	POR; 2	POR; 3	10th	206
