= 2021 Formula Nordic =

Motor racing championship held in 2021

The 2021 Formula Nordic season will be the ninth season of the single-seater championship, and the third independent of the STCC branding, following the formation of the series' association in the wake of the STCC promoter's bankruptcy in 2018. Formula Nordic continues to use the previous Formula Renault 1.6 chassis and engines, as it used to go under the name of Formula Renault 1.6 Nordic before Renault Sport dropped its support for the 3.5 and 1.6 classes in late 2015. The season will begin on 18 June at Skellefteå Drivecenter Arena, and will conclude on 9 October at Ring Knutstorp after seven rounds. This season marked the start of a three season deal with Yokohama as the series' tyre supplier.

== Drivers and Teams ==
| Team | No. | Drivers | Rounds |
|---|---|---|---|
| Privateer | 1 | (Sweden) Elias Adestam | All |
| (Sweden) Siverholm Racing | 14 | (Sweden) William Siverholm | All |
| (Sweden) NIKA Racing | 16 | (Sweden) Calle Bergman | 1–4 |
| (Sweden) NIKA Racing | 44 | (Sweden) William Karlsson | All |
| (Norway) Team Greenpower | 7 | (Sweden) Ella Benje | 3 |
| (Norway) Team Greenpower | 21 | (Norway) Håvard Hallerud | 2–6 |
| (Sweden) Philips Racing Team | 23 | (Sweden) Philip Zielinski | All |
| (Sweden) WestCoast Racing | 41 | (Sweden) Emma Wigroth | All |
| (Sweden) WestCoast Racing | 46 | (Sweden) Wilmer Wallenstam | 2–5 |
| (Sweden) WestCoast Racing | 55 | (Sweden) Philip Victorsson | All |
| (Sweden) Trackstar Racing | 47 | (Sweden) Jonathan Engström | 5–6 |
| (Sweden) Trackstar Racing | 69 | (Sweden) Albin Karlsson | 1–3 |

== Race calendar and results ==
The season will start on the 18 June at Skellefteå Drivecenter Arena, and will conclude on 9 October at Ring Knutstorp after seven rounds. Like the previous season, the use of reversed grid races for the final race of the weekend, where the top 6 were inverted, was continued.

| Round | | Circuit | Date | Pole position | Fastest lap | Winning driver | Winning team |
|---|---|---|---|---|---|---|---|
| 1 | R1 | (Sweden) Skellefteå Drivecenter Arena, Fällfors | 19 June | (Sweden) William Karlsson | (Sweden) Philip Victorsson | (Sweden) William Karlsson | (Sweden) NIKA Racing |
| 1 | R2 | (Sweden) Skellefteå Drivecenter Arena, Fällfors | 19 June | (Sweden) William Karlsson | (Sweden) Philip Victorsson | (Sweden) William Karlsson | (Sweden) NIKA Racing |
| 1 | R3 | (Sweden) Skellefteå Drivecenter Arena, Fällfors | 19 June | | (Sweden) Philip Victorsson | (Sweden) Philip Victorsson | (Sweden) WestCoast Racing |
| 2 | R1 | (Sweden) Falkenbergs Motorbana, Bergagård | 11 July | (Sweden) William Karlsson | (Sweden) William Karlsson | (Sweden) William Karlsson | (Sweden) NIKA Racing |
| 2 | R2 | (Sweden) Falkenbergs Motorbana, Bergagård | 11 July | (Sweden) William Karlsson | (Sweden) William Karlsson | (Sweden) William Karlsson | (Sweden) NIKA Racing |
| 2 | R3 | (Sweden) Falkenbergs Motorbana, Bergagård | 11 July | | (Sweden) William Karlsson | (Sweden) William Karlsson | (Sweden) NIKA Racing |
| 3 | R1 | (Sweden) Gelleråsen Arena, Karlskoga | 21 August | (Sweden) William Karlsson | (Sweden) William Karlsson | (Sweden) William Karlsson | (Sweden) NIKA Racing |
| 3 | R2 | (Sweden) Gelleråsen Arena, Karlskoga | 22 August | (Sweden) William Karlsson | (Sweden) Philip Victorsson | (Sweden) Elias Adestam | Privateer |
| 3 | R3 | (Sweden) Gelleråsen Arena, Karlskoga | 22 August | | (Sweden) William Siverholm | (Sweden) Philip Zielinski | (Sweden) Philips Racing Team |
| 4 | R1 | (Sweden) Anderstorp Raceway, Anderstorp | 5 September | (Sweden) William Siverholm | (Sweden) Philip Victorsson | (Sweden) Philip Victorsson | (Sweden) WestCoast Racing |
| 4 | R2 | (Sweden) Anderstorp Raceway, Anderstorp | 5 September | | (Sweden) Calle Bergman | (Sweden) William Karlsson | (Sweden) NIKA Racing |
| 5 | R1 | (Sweden) Mantorp Park, Mantorp | 3 October | (Sweden) William Siverholm | (Sweden) William Siverholm | (Sweden) Philip Victorsson | (Sweden) WestCoast Racing |
| 5 | R2 | (Sweden) Mantorp Park, Mantorp | 3 October | | (Sweden) William Siverholm | (Sweden) William Siverholm | (Sweden) Siverholm Racing |
| 6 | R1 | (Sweden) Ring Knutstorp, Kågeröd | 9 October | (Sweden) Philip Victorsson | (Sweden) William Siverholm | (Sweden) Philip Victorsson | (Sweden) WestCoast Racing |
| 6 | R2 | (Sweden) Ring Knutstorp, Kågeröd | 9 October | | (Sweden) William Karlsson | (Sweden) Elias Adestam | Privateer |

== Championship standings ==
Qualifying points system

Points are awarded to the top 5 fastest qualifying times.

| Position | **1st** | **2nd** | **3rd** | **4th** | **5th** |
| Points | 5 | 4 | 3 | 2 | 1 |

Race points system

Points are awarded to the top 10 classified finishers, no points are offered for fastest lap.

| Position | **1st** | **2nd** | **3rd** | **4th** | **5th** | **6th** | **7th** | **8th** | **9th** | **10th** |
| Points | 25 | 18 | 15 | 12 | 10 | 8 | 6 | 4 | 2 | 1 |

Two championships are held, the Junior Svenskt Mästerskap (JSM) for drivers under 26 years old holding a Swedish driver license, and the Formula Nordic Cup, the latter serving as the overall championship.

=== Formula Nordic Drivers' Championship (Nordic Cup and JSM) ===
| Pos | Driver | SKE (Sweden) | | | FAL (Sweden) | | | KAR (Sweden) | | | AND (Sweden) | | MAN (Sweden) | | KNU (Sweden) | | Pts |
|---|---|---|---|---|---|---|---|---|---|---|---|---|---|---|---|---|---|
| 1 | (Sweden) William Karlsson | **1**^{1} | **1** | 2 | **1**^{1} | **1** | 1 | **1**^{1} | **2** | 6 | 2^{3} | 1 | 4^{5} | Ret | 2^{2} | 3 | 305 |
| 2 | (Sweden) Philip Victorsson | 2^{2} | 2 | 1 | 3^{4} | DNS | DNS | 2^{3} | 3 | 5 | 1^{2} | Ret | 1^{3} | 6 | **1**^{1} | 6 | 231 |
| 3 | (Sweden) Elias Adestam | 6 | 6 | 5 | 4 | 4 | 4 | 3^{4} | 1 | 3 | 7^{4} | 2 | 3^{2} | 2 | 4^{4} | 1 | 215 |
| 4 | (Sweden) William Siverholm | 3^{3} | 4 | 6 | 5 | 3 | 3 | 4^{2} | 4 | 4 | **Ret**^{1} | Ret | **2**^{1} | 1 | 3^{3} | 5 | 199 |
| 5 | (Sweden) Philip Zielinski | 5^{5} | 5 | 3 | 7 | 6 | DNS | 10 | 5 | 1 | 4 | 3 | 5 | 4 | 6 | 4 | 156 |
| 6 | (Norway) Håvard Hallerud | | | | 2^{2} | 2 | 7 | DNS | DNS | DNS | 5^{5} | Ret | 7^{4} | 3 | 5^{5} | 2 | 109 |
| 7 | (Sweden) Calle Bergman | 4^{4} | 3 | 4 | 6^{3} | 8 | DNS | 6^{5} | 6 | 2 | 3 | Ret | | | | | 98 |
| 8 | (Sweden) Emma Wigroth | 8 | 7 | 7 | 9 | 7 | 5 | 9 | 8 | 8 | 6 | 4 | 9 | Ret | 8 | 7 | 78 |
| 9 | (Sweden) Albin Karlsson | 7 | DNS | DNS | 8^{5} | 5 | 2 | 5 | 7 | 7 | | | | | | | 61 |
| 10 | (Sweden) Wilmer Wallenstam | | | | 10 | 9 | 6 | 7 | 9 | 9 | 8 | 5 | 8 | 7 | | | 47 |
| 11 | (Sweden) Jonathan Engström | | | | | | | | | | | | 6 | 5 | 7 | Ret | 24 |
| 12 | (Sweden) Ella Benje | | | | | | | 8 | 10 | 10 | | | | | | | 8 |
| Pos | Driver | SKE | | | FAL | | | KAR | | | AND | | MAN | | KNU | | Pts |

| Colour | Result |
|---|---|
| Gold | Winner |
| Silver | Second place |
| Bronze | Third place |
| Green | Points classification |
| Blue | Non-points classification |
| Blue | Non-classified finish (NC) |
| Purple | Retired, not classified (Ret) |
| Red | Did not qualify (DNQ) |
| Red | Did not pre-qualify (DNPQ) |
| Black | Disqualified (DSQ) |
| White | Did not start (DNS) |
| White | Withdrew (WD) |
| White | Race cancelled (C) |
| Blank | Did not practice (DNP) |
| Blank | Did not arrive (DNA) |
| Blank | Excluded (EX) |

**Bold** – Pole
Italics – Fastest Lap
1 – 5 Points for Pole
2 – 4 Points for P2
3 – 3 Points for P3
4 – 2 Points for P4
5 – 1 Point for P5
