= Aquila Racing Cars =

Danish race car manufacturer

- Company type: Aps
- Industry: Automotive
- Founded: 2003
- Founder: Dan Suenson and Anders W Bonde
- Headquarters: Gram, Denmark
- Products: Sports cars
- Website: aquilaracingcars.com

Aquila Racing Cars is a race car manufacturer from Denmark.

Although the company has only been established since 2003 the key personnel involved have been racing for decades. Chief designer Anders W. Bonde and General manager Dan Suenson with their individual organizations teamed up and constructed a Formula Ford for the ‘Einsteiger’ series.

In 2005, development started and by 2006 the first Aquila FZ1 was winning international races. The Aquila FZ1 won the 2007 Danish Formula Ford championship with Christian L. Markussen at the wheel. Both drivers finished in the points every race that season.

By 2008, a regulation change in Formula Ford required running with a Duratec engine, in response the FD1 was developed and in its first season out, dominated the Danish championship with Fukamoni Racing's Kevin Magnussen fresh from karting. The season included several victories and lap records.

The Aquila concept uses simple and stiff chassis technology, with a focus on reducing the car's center of gravity in order to utilise the contact patch as much as possible, reducing the wear on tires and brake pads.

The Aquila CR1 is now the face of Aquila Racing Cars and many people refer to it as just “the Aquila.” With smooth styling and big V8's for reliability the CR1 is used as both a track day car and serious race car. Designed to be easy to drive with the lowest possible center of gravity, the two seated sports GT can be set up for a new track within 30 minutes thanks to its 8 pin release system on the front and rear (engine) cover. This means the bodywork can be removed by two mechanics in less than one minute, giving immediate access to all of the cars components for setup.

The Aquila CR1 sports GT has continued to represent the company on an international level since the first cars rolled of the production line in April 2008, and became 24 hour approved by Wessex Vehicles at Silverstone, England, during the 2011 Britcar 24 hour race.

== Current models ==
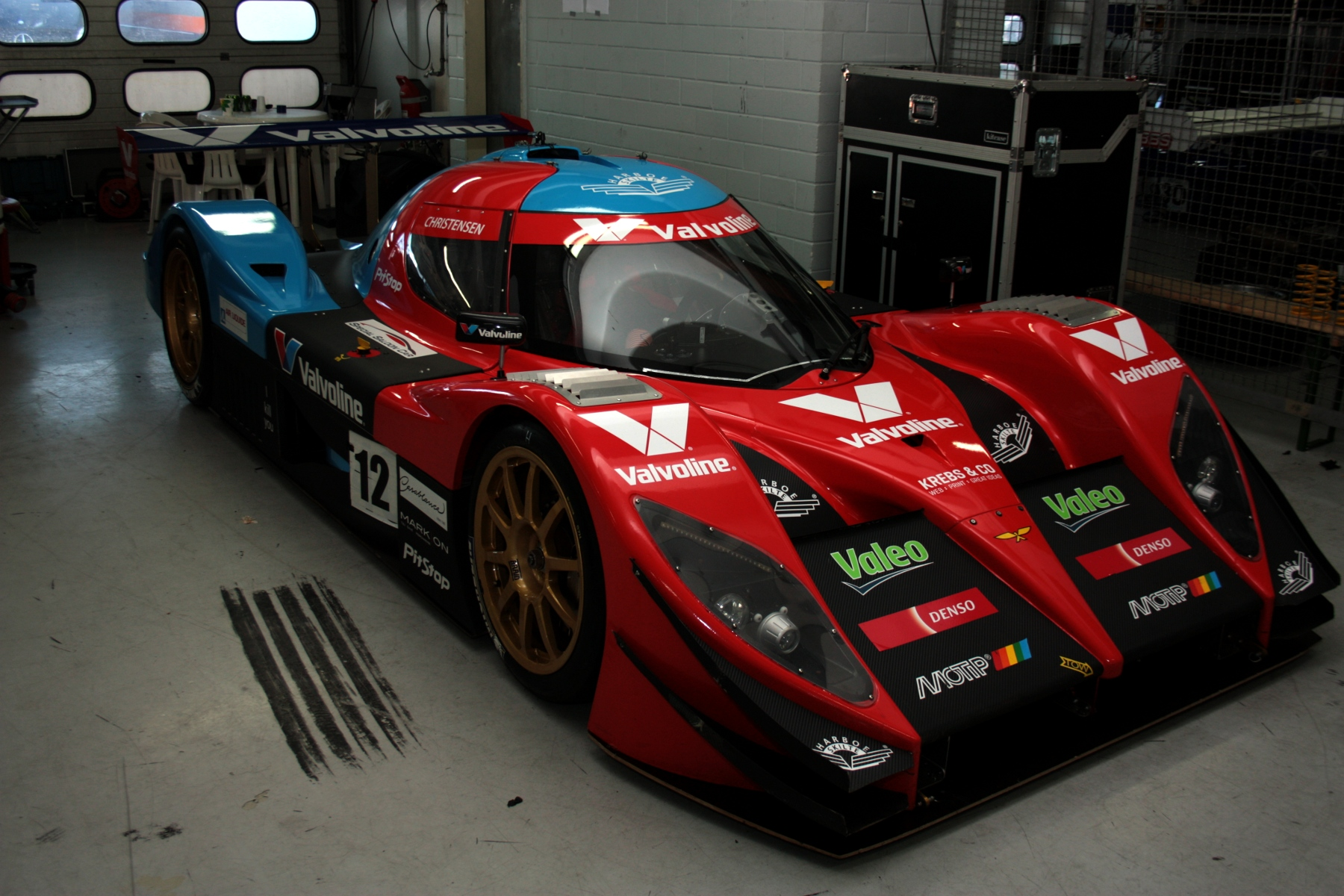
Aquila CR1 at Hockenheimring 2011

=== CR1 Sports GT ===
The Aquila CR1 has a low mass of 900 kg, extremely low centre of gravity, and low frontal area. The Aquila CR1 chassis has undergone more than four seasons of continuous competitive racing development. The car is accepted into numerous championships across Europe.The Aquila CR1 will also accommodate two 6’ 8” (207 cm) tall persons simultaneously in a car that only measures 1025mm from the tarmac to the top of the roof. An excellent feature which is used by Aquila to attract larger gentleman drivers.

Aquila Racing Cars use the CR1 to host events and promote businesses. Each year Aquila Racing Cars Denmark, generates over 50,000 Danish Krone for charity with CR1 tours in Copenhagen.

All Aquila CR1 sports GT's include:

- Traction control
- Integral air jack system
- Windshield wiper system
- Headlights, taillights, brake lights and turn signals
- Centre lock hubs
- Wheels with slicks
- Fully adjustable front and rear anti-roll bars (front bar adjustable by driver
- Electrically heated triplex windshield for de-misting
- Adjustable pedal box for reach from driver's seat
- Quick-change facility for left hand drive or right hand drive
- Electrically activated fire extinguishing system
- Euro4 ECU
- Adjustable rear wing

==== CR1 M60 ====
- N Engine: BMW M60, 4.0l V8
- Weight: 900 kg
- Power: 300 bhp
- Power-to-weight ratio: 2.966 kg per bhp
- Transmission: Hewland NLT 6 speed sequential, 7.25” twin plate clutch, optional paddle shift
- Chassis: High strength aluminium bonded and riveted monocoque
- Brakes: Wilwood 4 piston front and rear (interchangeable)
- Fuel cell: 80litre FT3, low CG mounted fuel cell
- Suspension: Push rod activated Intrax adjustable coilovers (interchangeable)
- Wishbones: All round wishbone setup interchangeable left/right on the front and rear
- Wheels: Front – 18”X11.5” Rear – 18”X13.5”
- Bodywork: Vacuum moulded super lightweight composite bodywork. 4 pin release system, sectional bodywork for easy repair. Wooden replaceable splitter
- Cockpit: Adjustable pedal box for faster driver change, overhead switches, easy read steering wheel dash, over spacious design, driver adjustable front anti roll bar, adjustable brake bias and forced air driver cooling
- Exhaust: Stainless steel
- Safety: FIA spec electrical fire extinguisher system, FIA FT3 safety cell, 6 point harnesses, front crash box, quick release doors, group CN spec rollover structure and triplex laminated windshield with heating. 0.75mm oversize monocoque sheets

==== CR1 LS1 ====
- Engine: LS1, 5.7l V8
- Weight: 900 kg
- Power: 350 bhp
- Power-to-weight ratio: 2.517 kg per bhp
- Transmission: Hewland NLT 6 speed sequential, 7.25” triple plate clutch, optional paddle shift
- Chassis: High strength aluminium bonded and riveted monocoque
- Brakes: Wilwood 4 piston front and rear (interchangeable)
- Fuel cell: 80litre FT3, low CG mounted fuel cell
- Suspension: Push rod activated Intrax adjustable coilovers (interchangeable)
- Wishbones: All round wishbone setup interchangeable left/right on the front and rear
- Wheels: Front – 18”X11.5” Rear – 18”X13.5”
- Bodywork: Vacuum moulded super lightweight composite bodywork. 4 pin release system, sectional bodywork for easy repair. Wooden replaceable splitter
- Cockpit: Adjustable pedal box for faster driver change, overhead switches, easy read steering wheel dash, over spacious design, driver adjustable front anti roll bar, adjustable brake bias and forced air driver cooling
- Exhaust: Stainless steel
- Safety: FIA spec electrical fire extinguisher system, FIA FT3 safety cell, 6 point harnesses, front crash box, quick release doors, group CN spec rollover structure and triplex laminated windshield with heating. 0.75mm oversize monocoque sheets

==== CR1 LS3 ====
- Engine: GM LS3, 6.2l V8
- Weight: 900 kg
- Power: 429 bhp
- Power-to-weight ratio: 2.097 kg per bhp
- Transmission: Hewland NLT 6 speed sequential, 7.25” triple plate clutch, optional paddle shift
- Chassis: High strength aluminium bonded and riveted monocoque
- Brakes: Wilwood 4 piston front and rear (interchangeable)
- Fuel cell: 80litre FT3, low CG mounted fuel cell
- Suspension: Push rod activated Intrax adjustable coilovers (interchangeable)
- Wishbones: All round wishbone setup interchangeable left/right on the front and rear
- Wheels: Front – 18”X11.5” Rear – 18”X13.5”
- Bodywork: Vacuum moulded super lightweight composite bodywork. 4 pin release system, sectional bodywork for easy repair. Wooden replaceable splitter
- Cockpit: Adjustable pedal box for faster driver change, overhead switches, easy read steering wheel dash, over spacious design, driver adjustable front anti roll bar, adjustable brake bias and forced air driver cooling
- Exhaust: Stainless steel
- Safety: FIA spec electrical fire extinguisher system, FIA FT3 safety cell, 6 point harnesses, front crash box, quick release doors, group CN spec rollover structure and triplex laminated windshield with heating. 0.75mm oversize monocoque sheets

==== CR1 LS7 ====
- Engine: GM LS7, 7.0l V8
- Weight: 900 kg
- Power: 550 bhp
- Power-to-weight ratio:1.636 kg per bhp
- Transmission: Hewland NLT 6 speed sequential, 7.25” triple plate clutch, optional paddle shift
- Chassis: High strength aluminium bonded and riveted monocoque
- Brakes: Wilwood 4 piston front and rear (interchangeable)
- Fuel cell: 80litre FT3, low CG mounted fuel cell
- Suspension: Push rod activated Intrax adjustable coilovers (interchangeable)
- Wishbones: All round wishbone setup interchangeable left/right on the front and rear
- Wheels: Front – 18”X11.5” Rear – 18”X13.5”
- Bodywork: Vacuum moulded super lightweight composite bodywork. 4 pin release system, sectional bodywork for easy repair. Wooden replaceable splitter
- Cockpit: Adjustable pedal box for faster driver change, overhead switches, easy read steering wheel dash, over spacious design, driver adjustable front anti roll bar, adjustable brake bias and forced air driver cooling
- Exhaust: Stainless steel
- Safety: FIA spec electrical fire extinguisher system, FIA FT3 safety cell, 6 point harnesses, front crash box, quick release doors, group CN spec rollover structure and triplex laminated windshield with heating. 0.75mm oversize monocoque sheets

=== Formula Fords ===
The Aquila Formula Ford is a Formula Ford chassis, designed for use on tracks with a preponderance of slow and medium speed corners. The Aquila Formula Ford breaks the trend of Formula Ford chassis getting ever longer, taller and fatter. The Aquila engineers studied the technical regulations, with the assistance of Ford and the UK Formula Ford Chief Scrutineer.

==== FZ1 ====
Formula Ford with Zetec 1.8L

==== FD1 ====
Formula Ford with Duratec 1.6L

== History ==
- 2003 – Founding of Aquila.
- 2005– The idea of producing a Formula Ford begins.
- 2005 – 2006 – Development and build of the first two Aquila FZ1 Formula Fords.
- 2006 – The first public race at Jyllands-Ringen in Denmark.
- 2006 – Tommy Nygård 6th in the Danish Championship
- 2006 – Vibe Smed 16th in the Danish Championship
- 2007 – Aquila the company was officially incorporated in February.
- 2007 – Christian Markussen first in the Danish Championship
- 2007 – Vibe Smed 6th in the Danish Championship
- 2007 – First Danish produced race car to win an international race, Christian Marcussen in an Aquila FZ1 in the Noric Championship at Sturup raceway.
- 2008 – Kevin Magnussen 1st in the Danish championship
- 2008 – Martin L. Hansen 10th in the Danish championship
- 2008 – The first Aquila CR1 M60 rolls out in April.
- 2009 – First international appearances with the factory CR1 M60 in the Dutch Supercar Challenge at Spa and in Britcar at Brands Hatch.
- 2010 – Introduction of the LS series engines to the CR1.
- 2010 – First car privately ran in the UK by Wessex Vehicles.
- 2011 – First CR1 to win the Danish special Saloon series. Claus Christensen in an Aquila CR1 LS7.
- 2011 – CR1 LS7 become 24 hour approved with Wessex Vehicles in the Britcar 24 hour at Silverstone.
- 2012 – Aquila expand into Eastern Europe starting with a race in Lithuania, the Palanga 1,000 km.
- 2012 – Claus Christensen retains the Danish Special Saloon series in an Aquila CR1 LS7.
- 2013 – Aquila Launch the Adamo project.
- 2013 – Claus Christensen wins the Nordic Special Saloon Series in an Aquila CR1 sports GT
