= Spielberg Formula 2 round =

(Austria) Spielberg Formula 2 round

FIA Formula 2 Championship
- Venue: Red Bull Ring
- Location: Spielberg, Styria, Austria
- First race: 2017
- Most wins (driver): (Russia) Artem Markelov (Netherlands) Richard Verschoor (both 2)
- Most wins (team): (Italy) Prema Racing (Netherlands) MP Motorsport (both 3)
- Lap record: 1:15.854 ( (Japan) Nobuharu Matsushita, ART Grand Prix, GP2/11, 2017)

(Austria) Red Bull Ring GP2 Series round
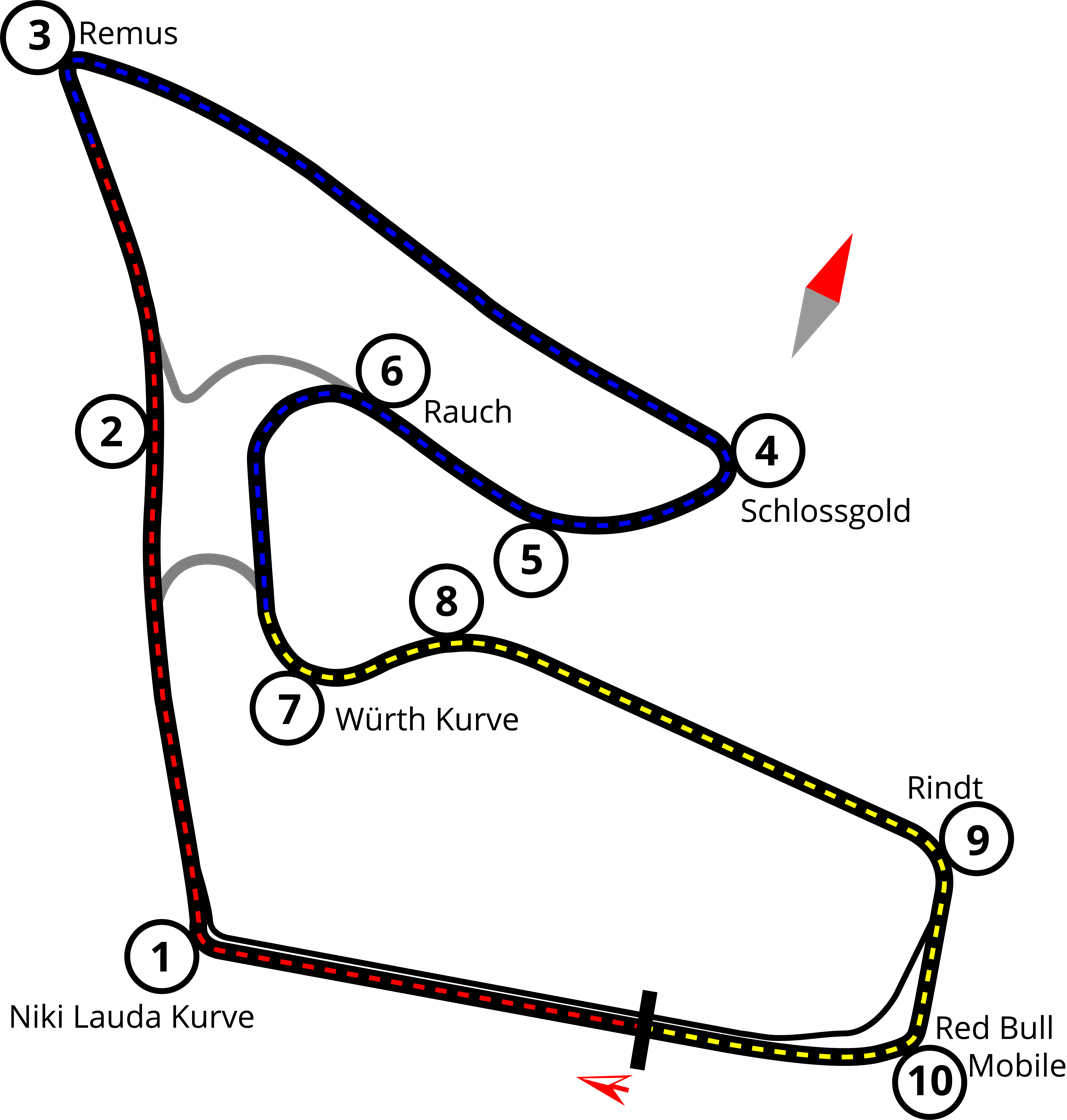

GP2 Series
- First race: 2014
- Last race: 2016
- Most wins (team): (Spain) Campos Racing (2)
- Lap record: 1:15.534 ( (New Zealand) Mitch Evans, Campos Racing, GP2/11, 2016)

The Spielberg Formula 2 round, formerly Red Bull Ring GP2 Series round, is a FIA Formula 2 Championship series race that is run on the Red Bull Ring in Spielberg, Styria, Austria.

== Winners ==
A green background indicates an event which was part of the GP2 Series event.

Year	Race	Driver	Team	Report
2014	Feature	(Brazil) Felipe Nasr	Carlin	Report
2014	Sprint	(Venezuela) Johnny Cecotto Jr.	Trident	Report
2015	Feature	(Belgium) Stoffel Vandoorne	ART Grand Prix	Report
2015	Sprint	(Indonesia) Rio Haryanto	Campos Racing	Report
2016	Feature	(New Zealand) Mitch Evans	Campos Racing	Report
2016	Sprint	(United Kingdom) Jordan King	Racing Engineering	Report
2017	Feature	(Monaco) Charles Leclerc	Prema Racing	Report
2017	Sprint	(Russia) Artem Markelov	Russian Time	Report
2018	Feature	(United Kingdom) George Russell	ART Grand Prix	Report
2018	Sprint	(Russia) Artem Markelov	Russian Time	Report
2019	Feature	(Japan) Nobuharu Matsushita	Carlin	Report
2019	Sprint	(Brazil) Sérgio Sette Câmara	DAMS	Report
2020	Feature	(United Kingdom) Callum Ilott	MP Motorsport	Report
2020	Sprint	(Brazil) Felipe Drugovich	MP Motorsport	Report
2020	Feature	(Russia) Robert Shwartzman	Prema Racing	Report
2020	Sprint	(Denmark) Christian Lundgaard	ART Grand Prix	Report
2022	Sprint	(New Zealand) Marcus Armstrong	Hitech Grand Prix	Report
2022	Feature	(United States) Logan Sargeant	Carlin	Report
2023	Sprint	(United States) Jak Crawford	Hitech Pulse-Eight	Report
2023	Feature	(Netherlands) Richard Verschoor	Van Amersfoort Racing	Report
2024	Sprint	(United Kingdom) Oliver Bearman	Prema Racing	Report
2024	Feature	(Brazil) Gabriel Bortoleto	Invicta Racing	Report
2025	Sprint	(Spain) Pepe Martí	Campos Racing	Report
2025	Feature	(Netherlands) Richard Verschoor	MP Motorsport	Report
2026	Sprint	(United Kingdom) John Bennett	Trident	Report
2026	Feature	(Bulgaria) Nikola Tsolov	Campos Racing	Report

== See also ==
- Austrian Grand Prix
- Styrian Grand Prix
