= Fornaroli =

Fornaroli is a surname. Notable people with the surname include:

- Bruno Fornaroli (born 1987), Uruguayan footballer
- Leonardo Fornaroli (born 2004), Italian racing driver
