= 2021 ADAC Formula 4 Championship =

Motorsport racing season

The 2021 ADAC Formula 4 Championship was the seventh season of the ADAC Formula 4, an open-wheel motor racing series. It was a multi-event motor racing championship that featured drivers competing in 1.4 litre Tatuus-Abarth single seat race cars that conformed to the technical regulations for the championship.

== Teams and drivers ==
| Team | No. | Driver | Class | Rounds |
|---|---|---|---|---|
| (Germany) BWR Motorsports | 3 | (Italy) Alfio Spina | R | 6 |
| (Germany) BWR Motorsports | 4 | (United Kingdom) Taylor Barnard | | 1–3, 6 |
| (Germany) BWR Motorsports | 11 | (Germany) Valentino Catalano | | 1–2 |
| (France) R-ace GP | 5 | (Hungary) Levente Révész | R G | 2, 5 |
| (France) R-ace GP | 17 | (France) Sami Meguetounif | | All |
| (France) R-ace GP | 26 | (France) Victor Bernier | | All |
| (France) R-ace GP | 47 | (Singapore) Nikhil Bohra (Note: Bohra is an American-Indian driver racing under a Singaporean licence.) | R | 6 |
| (France) R-ace GP | 52 | (France) Marcus Amand | R | All |
| (Italy) Prema Powerteam | 6 | (Colombia) Sebastián Montoya (Note: Montoya is a Colombian-American driver competing under an American licence.) | | 1–2 |
| (Italy) Prema Powerteam | 7 | (Russia) Kirill Smal | | 1–2 |
| (Italy) Prema Powerteam | 20 | (Denmark) Conrad Laursen | | 1–2 |
| (Italy) Prema Powerteam | 88 | (United Arab Emirates) Hamda Al Qubaisi | | 1–2 |
| (Germany) US Racing | 8 | (United Kingdom) Luke Browning | | All |
| (Germany) US Racing | 22 | (Republic of Ireland) Alex Dunne | R | 3, 5–6 |
| (Germany) US Racing | 69 | (Russia) Vladislav Lomko | | All |
| (Germany) US Racing | 77 | (Germany) Tim Tramnitz | | All |
| (Netherlands) Van Amersfoort Racing | 13 | (Switzerland) Joshua Dufek | | 1–3, 5–6 |
| (Netherlands) Van Amersfoort Racing | 15 | (Russia) Nikita Bedrin | R | All |
| (Netherlands) Van Amersfoort Racing | 18 | (China) Cenyu Han | | 1–2 |
| (Netherlands) Van Amersfoort Racing | 34 | (Australia) Marcos Flack | R | 6 |
| (Netherlands) Van Amersfoort Racing | 46 | (Netherlands) Robert de Haan | R | 6 |
| (Netherlands) Van Amersfoort Racing | 86 | (Hungary) Bence Válint | | 1–3 |
| (Netherlands) Van Amersfoort Racing | 87 | (United Kingdom) Oliver Bearman | | All |
| (Switzerland) Sauter Engineering + Design | 21 | (Switzerland) Michael Sauter | R | All |
| (Switzerland) Jenzer Motorsport | 65 | (Switzerland) Samir Ben | R G | 1 |
| (Switzerland) Jenzer Motorsport | 66 | (Mexico) Jorge Garcíarce | G | 1–2 |
| (Switzerland) Jenzer Motorsport | 67 | (Italy) Francesco Braschi | G | 1–2 |
| (Switzerland) Jenzer Motorsport | 68 | (Mexico) Santiago Ramos | G | 1 |
| (Italy) Iron Lynx | 72 | (Italy) Leonardo Fornaroli | G | 1–2 |
| (Italy) Iron Lynx | 73 | (Italy) Pietro Armanni | R G | 1 |
| (Italy) Iron Lynx | 83 | (Belgium) Maya Weug (Note: Weug is a Dutch-Belgian-Spanish driver who competed under a Belgian licence.) | R G | 1–2 |

| Icon | Legend |
|---|---|
| R | Rookie |
| G | Guest drivers ineligible to score points |

== Race calendar and results ==
The provisional calendar was released on 8 November 2020. Initially, all rounds were to support the 2021 ADAC GT Masters. The updated version was published on 6 December 2020. Other tweaks in the calendar in order to avoid clashes with the Italian counterpart, including moving forward the opening round to 24–25 April, were announced on 3 March 2021. Additionally, the first of two rounds in Hockenheim will be held separately from ADAC GT Masters. Due to the pandemic, the round at Motorsport Arena Oschersleben was postponed to 25–27 June and removed from the calendar eventually. The round at Nürburgring planned in early August was postponed after massive flooding in Germany. The new date was set to 5–7 November, making its the series finale.

| Round | | Circuit | Date | Pole position | Fastest lap | Winning driver | Winning team | Rookie winner |
|---|---|---|---|---|---|---|---|---|
| 1 | R1 | (Austria) Red Bull Ring, Spielberg | 12 June | (United Kingdom) Oliver Bearman | (Russia) Kirill Smal | (United Kingdom) Oliver Bearman | (Netherlands) Van Amersfoort Racing | (Russia) Nikita Bedrin |
| 1 | R2 | (Austria) Red Bull Ring, Spielberg | 12 June | (Germany) Tim Tramnitz | (United Kingdom) Oliver Bearman | (United Kingdom) Oliver Bearman | (Netherlands) Van Amersfoort Racing | (Russia) Nikita Bedrin |
| 1 | R3 | (Austria) Red Bull Ring, Spielberg | 13 June | | (Hungary) Bence Válint | (United Kingdom) Luke Browning | (Germany) US Racing | (Russia) Nikita Bedrin |
| 2 | R1 | (Netherlands) Circuit Zandvoort, Zandvoort | 10 July | (United Kingdom) Oliver Bearman | (United States) Sebastián Montoya | (United Kingdom) Oliver Bearman | (Netherlands) Van Amersfoort Racing | (Russia) Nikita Bedrin |
| 2 | R2 | (Netherlands) Circuit Zandvoort, Zandvoort | 11 July | (United Kingdom) Oliver Bearman | (United Kingdom) Oliver Bearman | (United Kingdom) Oliver Bearman | (Netherlands) Van Amersfoort Racing | (Russia) Nikita Bedrin |
| 2 | R3 | (Netherlands) Circuit Zandvoort, Zandvoort | 11 July | | (United States) Sebastián Montoya | (Russia) Kirill Smal | (Italy) Prema Powerteam | (Switzerland) Michael Sauter |
| 3 | R1 | (Germany) Hockenheimring, Hockenheim | 18 September | (United Kingdom) Oliver Bearman | (Germany) Tim Tramnitz | (United Kingdom) Oliver Bearman | (Netherlands) Van Amersfoort Racing | (Republic of Ireland) Alex Dunne |
| 3 | R2 | (Germany) Hockenheimring, Hockenheim | 19 September | (Germany) Tim Tramnitz | (Republic of Ireland) Alex Dunne | (Germany) Tim Tramnitz | (Germany) US Racing | (Republic of Ireland) Alex Dunne |
| 3 | R3 | (Germany) Hockenheimring, Hockenheim | 19 September | | (Russia) Vladislav Lomko | (Russia) Nikita Bedrin | (Netherlands) Van Amersfoort Racing | (Russia) Nikita Bedrin |
| 4 | R1 | (Germany) Sachsenring, Chemnitz | 2 October | (Germany) Tim Tramnitz | (United Kingdom) Luke Browning | (Germany) Tim Tramnitz | (Germany) US Racing | (Russia) Nikita Bedrin |
| 4 | R2 | (Germany) Sachsenring, Chemnitz | 3 October | (Germany) Tim Tramnitz | (France) Victor Bernier | (Germany) Tim Tramnitz | (Germany) US Racing | (Russia) Nikita Bedrin |
| 4 | R3 | (Germany) Sachsenring, Chemnitz | 3 October | | (United Kingdom) Oliver Bearman | (Russia) Vladislav Lomko | (Germany) US Racing | (Russia) Nikita Bedrin |
| 5 | R1 | (Germany) Hockenheimring, Hockenheim | 23 October | (Republic of Ireland) Alex Dunne | (France) Victor Bernier | (France) Victor Bernier (Note: Oliver Bearman originally won the race, but was given a five-second penalty after a collision with Tim Tramnitz, thus making Victor Bernier the winner) | (France) R-ace GP | (Russia) Nikita Bedrin |
| 5 | R2 | (Germany) Hockenheimring, Hockenheim | 24 October | (Republic of Ireland) Alex Dunne | (Germany) Tim Tramnitz | (Germany) Tim Tramnitz | (Germany) US Racing | (Republic of Ireland) Alex Dunne |
| 5 | R3 | (Germany) Hockenheimring, Hockenheim | 24 October | | (United Kingdom) Luke Browning | (United Kingdom) Luke Browning | (Germany) US Racing | (Republic of Ireland) Alex Dunne |
| 6 | R1 | (Germany) Nürburgring, Nürburg | 6 November | (Germany) Tim Tramnitz | (Republic of Ireland) Alex Dunne | (Germany) Tim Tramnitz | (Germany) US Racing | (Republic of Ireland) Alex Dunne |
| 6 | R2 | (Germany) Nürburgring, Nürburg | 7 November | (United Kingdom) Oliver Bearman | (United Kingdom) Oliver Bearman | (United Kingdom) Oliver Bearman | (Netherlands) Van Amersfoort Racing | (Netherlands) Robert de Haan |
| 6 | R3 | (Germany) Nürburgring, Nürburg | 7 November | | (Republic of Ireland) Alex Dunne | (Russia) Nikita Bedrin | (Netherlands) Van Amersfoort Racing | (Russia) Nikita Bedrin |

== Championship standings ==
Points were awarded to the top 10 classified finishers in each race. No points were awarded for pole position or fastest lap. The final classification for the Drivers' Championship was obtained by summing up the scores on the 16 best results obtained during the races held.

| Position | **1st** | **2nd** | **3rd** | **4th** | **5th** | **6th** | **7th** | **8th** | **9th** | **10th** |
| Points | 25 | 18 | 15 | 12 | 10 | 8 | 6 | 4 | 2 | 1 |

=== Drivers' Championship ===
| Pos | Driver | RBR (Austria) | | | ZAN (Netherlands) | | | HOC1 (Germany) | | | SAC (Germany) | | | HOC2 (Germany) | | | NÜR (Germany) | | | Pts |
| Pos | Driver | R1 | R2 | R3 | R1 | R2 | R3 | R1 | R2 | R3 | R1 | R2 | R3 | R1 | R2 | R3 | R1 | R2 | R3 | Pts |
|---|---|---|---|---|---|---|---|---|---|---|---|---|---|---|---|---|---|---|---|---|
| 1 | (United Kingdom) Oliver Bearman | **1** | 1 | Ret | **1** | **1** | 4 | **1** | 4 | 2 | 2 | 4 | 2 | 6 | 2 | 3 | 5 | **1** | 4 | 295 |
| 2 | (Germany) Tim Tramnitz | 4 | **2** | 15† | 3 | 6 | 3 | 4 | **1** | 4 | **1** | **1** | 4 | 2 | 1 | 5 | **1** | 4 | 11 | 269 |
| 3 | (United Kingdom) Luke Browning | 7 | 5 | 1 | 4 | 9 | 6 | 3 | 3 | 6 | 3 | 2 | 7 | 5 | 5 | 1 | Ret | 2 | 3 | 220 |
| 4 | (France) Victor Bernier | 6 | 8 | 13 | 6 | 4 | 5 | 6 | 9 | 5 | 4 | 3 | 9 | 1 | 3 | 9 | 6 | 7 | 2 | 167 |
| 5 | (Russia) Nikita Bedrin | 12 | 11 | 3 | 11 | 3 | Ret | 7 | 7 | 1 | 7 | 5 | 3 | 7 | Ret | 11 | 7 | 6 | 1 | 147 |
| 6 | (Russia) Vladislav Lomko | 9 | 12 | NC | 7 | 10 | Ret | 5 | 6 | 3 | 5 | 7 | 1 | 3 | 6 | 7 | 3 | 9 | 9 | 134 |
| 7 | (Switzerland) Joshua Dufek | 11 | 4 | Ret | 8 | 2 | 7 | Ret | 5 | 8 | | | | 4 | 7 | 2 | 2 | 3 | 12 | 127 |
| 8 | (Republic of Ireland) Alex Dunne | | | | | | | 2 | 2 | DNS | | | | **Ret** | **4** | 4 | 4 | 15† | 8 | 76 |
| 9 | (Colombia) Sebastián Montoya | 2 | 7 | 7 | 2 | 8 | 2 | | | | | | | | | | | | | 72 |
| 10 | (Russia) Kirill Smal | 3 | 6 | Ret | 5 | 5 | 1 | | | | | | | | | | | | | 70 |
| 11 | (France) Sami Meguetounif | 8 | 15 | 6 | 22† | 7 | 14 | Ret | 11 | Ret | 6 | 8 | 6 | Ret | 8 | 6 | 10 | 14 | 6 | 61 |
| 12 | (France) Marcus Amand | DSQ | Ret | Ret | 16 | Ret | 13 | 8 | 10 | 9 | Ret | 6 | 8 | Ret | 9 | 8 | 9 | 8 | 7 | 37 |
| 13 | (China) Cenyu Han | 10 | 9 | 2 | 19 | 16 | 11 | | | | | | | | | | | | | 25 |
| 14 | (Netherlands) Robert de Haan | | | | | | | | | | | | | | | | 8 | 5 | 5 | 24 |
| 15 | (Switzerland) Michael Sauter | 17 | 19 | Ret | 20 | 19 | 12 | 10 | 13 | 11 | DNS | 9 | 5 | 8 | 10 | 12 | 13 | 10 | 13 | 19 |
| 16 | (Hungary) Bence Válint | 21 | Ret | 8 | 9 | 11 | 17 | 9 | 8 | 7 | | | | | | | | | | 18 |
| 17 | (United Kingdom) Taylor Barnard | 14 | 13 | 4 | 14 | Ret | 9 | Ret | 12 | 10 | | | | | | | 11 | 11 | 14 | 17 |
| 18 | (Germany) Valentino Catalano | 18 | 14 | 5 | 13 | 14 | Ret | | | | | | | | | | | | | 10 |
| 19 | (Denmark) Conrad Laursen | 13 | 17 | Ret | 15 | 15 | 10 | | | | | | | | | | | | | 2 |
| 20 | (Australia) Marcos Flack | | | | | | | | | | | | | | | | 12 | 13 | 10 | 1 |
| 21 | (United Arab Emirates) Hamda Al Qubaisi | 22† | Ret | Ret | 12 | 12 | Ret | | | | | | | | | | | | | 0 |
| 22 | (Singapore) Nikhil Bohra | | | | | | | | | | | | | | | | 14 | 12 | Ret | 0 |
| – | (Italy) Alfio Spina | | | | | | | | | | | | | | | | WD | WD | WD | – |
Guest drivers ineligible to score points
| – | (Italy) Leonardo Fornaroli | 5 | 3 | 11 | Ret | 13 | 8 | | | | | | | | | | | | | – |
| – | (Hungary) Levente Révész | | | | 21 | 17 | 16 | | | | | | | 9 | Ret | 10 | | | | – |
| – | (Belgium) Maya Weug | 15 | 16 | 9 | 18 | Ret | 15 | | | | | | | | | | | | | – |
| – | (Italy) Francesco Braschi | 20 | 10 | 14 | 10 | Ret | Ret | | | | | | | | | | | | | – |
| – | (Mexico) Jorge Garcíarce | 19 | 18 | 10 | 17 | 18 | Ret | | | | | | | | | | | | | – |
| – | (Switzerland) Samir Ben | 16 | 21 | 12 | | | | | | | | | | | | | | | | – |
| – | (Italy) Pietro Armanni | Ret | 20 | Ret | | | | | | | | | | | | | | | | – |
| – | (Mexico) Santiago Ramos | WD | WD | WD | | | | | | | | | | | | | | | | – |
| Pos | Driver | R1 | R2 | R3 | R1 | R2 | R3 | R1 | R2 | R3 | R1 | R2 | R3 | R1 | R2 | R3 | R1 | R2 | R3 | Pts |
| Pos | Driver | RBR (Austria) | | | ZAN (Netherlands) | | | HOC1 (Germany) | | | SAC (Germany) | | | HOC2 (Germany) | | | NÜR (Germany) | | | Pts |

| Colour | Result |
|---|---|
| Gold | Winner |
| Silver | Second place |
| Bronze | Third place |
| Green | Points classification |
| Blue | Non-points classification |
| Blue | Non-classified finish (NC) |
| Purple | Retired, not classified (Ret) |
| Red | Did not qualify (DNQ) |
| Red | Did not pre-qualify (DNPQ) |
| Black | Disqualified (DSQ) |
| White | Did not start (DNS) |
| White | Withdrew (WD) |
| White | Race cancelled (C) |
| Blank | Did not practice (DNP) |
| Blank | Did not arrive (DNA) |
| Blank | Excluded (EX) |

**Bold** – Pole
Italics – Fastest Lap
† — Did not finish but classified

=== Rookies' Championship ===
| Pos | Driver | RBR (Austria) | | | ZAN (Netherlands) | | | HOC1 (Germany) | | | SAC (Germany) | | | HOC2 (Germany) | | | NÜR (Germany) | | | Pts |
| Pos | Driver | R1 | R2 | R3 | R1 | R2 | R3 | R1 | R2 | R3 | R1 | R2 | R3 | R1 | R2 | R3 | R1 | R2 | R3 | Pts |
|---|---|---|---|---|---|---|---|---|---|---|---|---|---|---|---|---|---|---|---|---|
| 1 | (Russia) Nikita Bedrin | 12 | 11 | 3 | 11 | 3 | Ret | 7 | 7 | 1 | 7 | 5 | 3 | 6 | Ret | 11 | 7 | 6 | 1 | 362 |
| 2 | (Switzerland) Michael Sauter | 17 | 19 | Ret | 20 | 19 | 12 | 10 | 13 | 11 | DNS | 9 | 5 | 8 | 10 | 12 | 13 | 10 | 13 | 239 |
| 3 | (France) Marcus Amand | DSQ | Ret | Ret | 16 | Ret | 13 | 8 | 10 | 9 | Ret | 6 | 8 | Ret | 9 | 8 | 9 | 8 | 7 | 195 |
| 4 | (Republic of Ireland) Alex Dunne | | | | | | | 2 | 2 | DNS | | | | Ret | 4 | 4 | 4 | 15† | 9 | 143 |
| 5 | (Netherlands) Robert de Haan | | | | | | | | | | | | | | | | 8 | 5 | 5 | 58 |
| 6 | (Australia) Marcos Flack | | | | | | | | | | | | | | | | 12 | 13 | 8 | 30 |
| 7 | (Singapore) Nikhil Bohra | | | | | | | | | | | | | | | | 14 | 12 | Ret | 16 |
| – | (Italy) Alfio Spina | | | | | | | | | | | | | | | | WD | WD | WD | – |
Guest drivers ineligible to score points
| – | (Belgium) Maya Weug | 15 | 16 | 9 | 18 | Ret | 15 | | | | | | | | | | | | | – |
| – | (Hungary) Levente Révész | | | | 21 | 17 | 16 | | | | | | | 9 | Ret | 10 | | | | – |
| – | (Switzerland) Samir Ben | 16 | 21 | 12 | | | | | | | | | | | | | | | | – |
| – | (Italy) Pietro Armanni | Ret | 20 | Ret | | | | | | | | | | | | | | | | – |
| Pos | Driver | R1 | R2 | R3 | R1 | R2 | R3 | R1 | R2 | R3 | R1 | R2 | R3 | R1 | R2 | R3 | R1 | R2 | R3 | Pts |
| Pos | Driver | RBR (Austria) | | | ZAN (Netherlands) | | | HOC1 (Germany) | | | SAC (Germany) | | | HOC2 (Germany) | | | NÜR (Germany) | | | Pts |

=== Teams' Cup ===
Only two best team's drivers in each race were eligible to score points. The other drivers were omitted during rewarding the points.

| Pos | Driver | RBR (Austria) | | | ZAN (Netherlands) | | | HOC1 (Germany) | | | SAC (Germany) | | | HOC2 (Germany) | | | NÜR (Germany) | | | Pts |
| Pos | Driver | R1 | R2 | R3 | R1 | R2 | R3 | R1 | R2 | R3 | R1 | R2 | R3 | R1 | R2 | R3 | R1 | R2 | R3 | Pts |
|---|---|---|---|---|---|---|---|---|---|---|---|---|---|---|---|---|---|---|---|---|
| 1 | (Netherlands) Van Amersfoort Racing | 1 | 1 | 2 | 1 | 1 | 4 | 1 | 4 | 1 | 2 | 4 | 2 | 4 | 2 | 2 | 2 | 1 | 1 | 570 |
| 1 | (Netherlands) Van Amersfoort Racing | 10 | 4 | 3 | 8 | 2 | 7 | 7 | 5 | 2 | 7 | 5 | 3 | 6 | 7 | 3 | 5 | 3 | 4 | 570 |
| 2 | (Germany) US Racing | 4 | 2 | 1 | 3 | 6 | 3 | 2 | 1 | 3 | 1 | 1 | 1 | 2 | 1 | 1 | 1 | 2 | 3 | 564 |
| 2 | (Germany) US Racing | 7 | 5 | 15 | 4 | 9 | 6 | 3 | 2 | 4 | 3 | 2 | 4 | 3 | 4 | 4 | 3 | 4 | 9 | 564 |
| 3 | (France) R-ace GP | 6 | 8 | 6 | 6 | 4 | 5 | 6 | 9 | 5 | 4 | 3 | 6 | 1 | 3 | 6 | 6 | 7 | 2 | 323 |
| 3 | (France) R-ace GP | 8 | 15 | 13 | 16 | 7 | 13 | 8 | 10 | 9 | 6 | 6 | 8 | Ret | 8 | 8 | 9 | 8 | 6 | 323 |
| 4 | (Italy) Prema Powerteam | 2 | 6 | 7 | 2 | 5 | 1 | | | | | | | | | | | | | 146 |
| 4 | (Italy) Prema Powerteam | 3 | 7 | Ret | 5 | 8 | 2 | | | | | | | | | | | | | 146 |
| 5 | (Switzerland) Sauter Engineering + Design | 17 | 19 | Ret | 20 | 19 | 12 | 10 | 13 | 11 | DNS | 9 | 5 | 8 | 10 | 12 | 13 | 10 | 13 | 70 |
| 6 | (Germany) BWR Motorsports | 14 | 13 | 4 | 13 | 14 | 9 | Ret | 12 | 10 | | | | | | | 11 | 11 | 14 | 68 |
| 6 | (Germany) BWR Motorsports | 18 | 14 | 5 | 14 | Ret | Ret | | | | | | | | | | | | | 68 |
| Pos | Driver | R1 | R2 | R3 | R1 | R2 | R3 | R1 | R2 | R3 | R1 | R2 | R3 | R1 | R2 | R3 | R1 | R2 | R3 | Pts |
| Pos | Driver | RBR (Austria) | | | ZAN (Netherlands) | | | HOC1 (Germany) | | | SAC (Germany) | | | HOC2 (Germany) | | | NÜR (Germany) | | | Pts |

| Colour | Result |
|---|---|
| Gold | Winner |
| Silver | Second place |
| Bronze | Third place |
| Green | Points classification |
| Blue | Non-points classification |
| Blue | Non-classified finish (NC) |
| Purple | Retired, not classified (Ret) |
| Red | Did not qualify (DNQ) |
| Red | Did not pre-qualify (DNPQ) |
| Black | Disqualified (DSQ) |
| White | Did not start (DNS) |
| White | Withdrew (WD) |
| White | Race cancelled (C) |
| Blank | Did not practice (DNP) |
| Blank | Did not arrive (DNA) |
| Blank | Excluded (EX) |

† — Did not finish but classified
