= Leonardo Fornaroli =

Italian racing driver (born 2004)

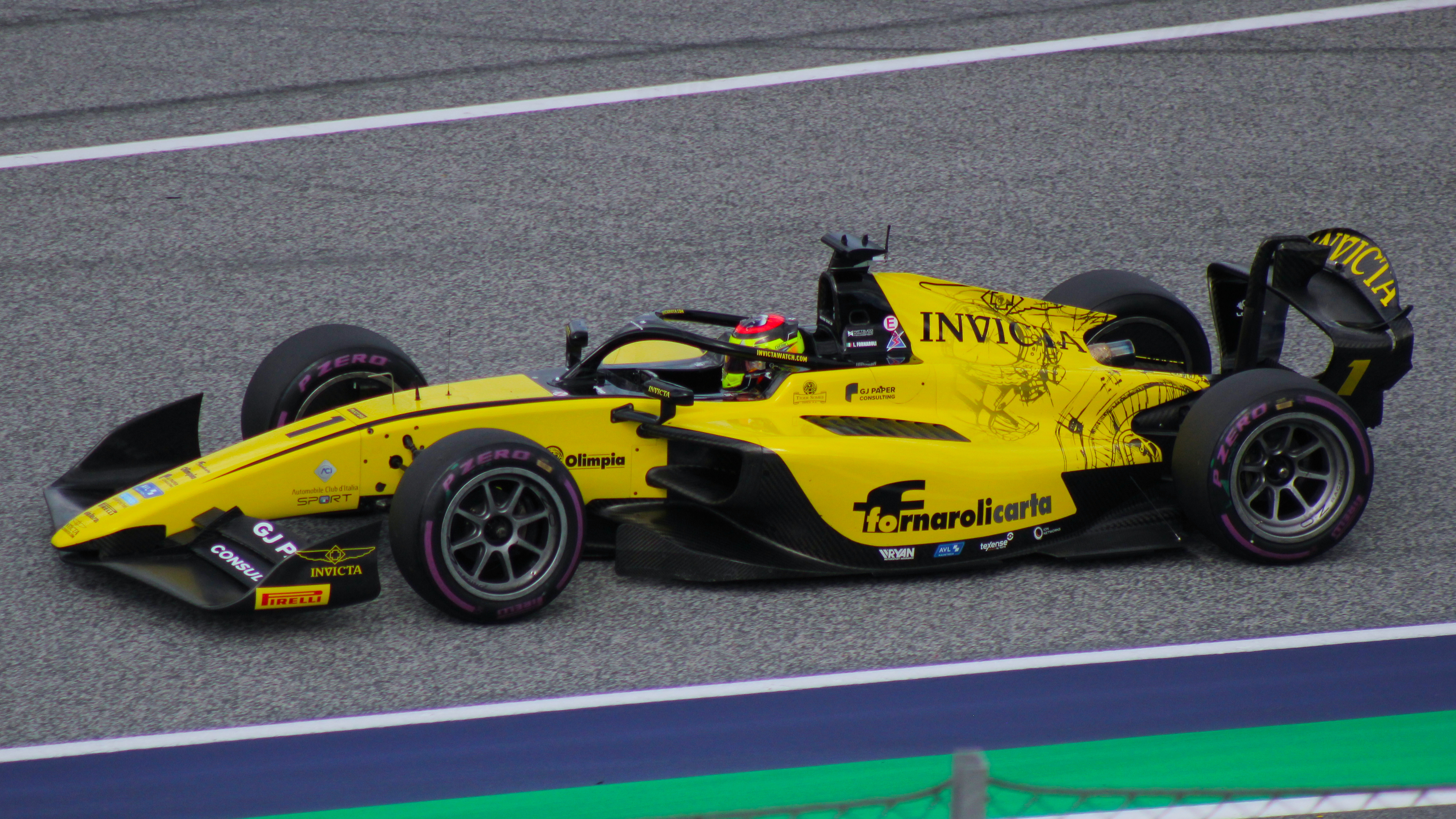
- Fornaroli driving the Dallara F2 2024 during the 2025 Spielberg Formula 2 round
- Nationality: (Italy) Italian
- Born: 3 December 2004 (age 21) Piacenza, Emilia-Romagna, Italy

FIA World Endurance Championship career
- Debut season: 2027
- Current team: McLaren Hypercar Team
- Starts: 0
- Wins: 0
- Podiums: 0
- Poles: 0
- Fastest laps: 0

Previous series
- 2024–2025; 2023–2024; 2022; 2022; 2020–2021; 2020–2021: FIA Formula 2; FIA Formula 3; FR European; FR Asian; Italian F4; ADAC F4

Championship titles
- 2025; 2024: FIA Formula 2; FIA Formula 3

Awards
- 2025: Anthoine Hubert Award

Leonardo Fornaroli (Italian pronunciation: [leoˈnardo foɾnaˈrɔːli]; born 3 December 2004) is an Italian racing driver who is set to compete in the FIA World Endurance Championship for McLaren. He also serves as a reserve driver in Formula One for McLaren. Fornaroli most recently competed in the FIA Formula 2 Championship for Invicta Racing.

Born in Piacenza, Fornaroli began competitive kart racing aged 10. He was the 2022 Formula Regional European rookie champion. Fornaroli won the 2024 FIA Formula 3 Championship in his second year with Trident, where he was the first champion to not win a single race in both his championship-winning campaign and his entire F3 career, and won the 2025 FIA Formula 2 Championship with Invicta to become the eighth driver in history to win the GP2/F2 title in their rookie season.

== Junior racing career ==
=== Karting (2014–2019) ===
Fornaroli began karting competitively in his native Italy around the age of ten, first winning the Mini Academy class of the Championkart championship in 2016 before moving up to X30 Junior the following year. He came runner-up in the 2017 X30 Challenge Italy, in a season that also included entry to international IAME events, but found more success in 2018, when he was third in the Italian Karting Championship and made his full-time European debut in the WSK Super Master Series. Fornaroli's final year in karting would prove to be his best, as he was a front-runner in the 2019 WSK Euro Series on his OK debut and finished third in the prestigious Andrea Margutti Trophy. At the end of the year, he was invited to participate in the 16th edition of the annual Supercorso Federale event at Vallelunga, as one of five young karting talents selected by ACI Sport and the Ferrari Driver Academy.

=== Formula 4 (2020–2021) ===
==== 2020 ====
Having tested a Formula 4 car for the first time at the Supercorso Federale, 2020 would see Fornaroli make his debut in the Italian F4 Championship, driving for sportscar racing team Iron Lynx, which extended its program to single-seaters. He repaid the faith straightaway, taking a solid fourth-place finish on debut at Misano. He would go on to score eight top-five finishes from 20 races, including a podium at Monza, and finished ninth in the overall standings on 108 points. At the end of the year, as an award for his performances, Fornaroli was again invited to ACI Sport's Supercorso Federale, together with F4 rivals Gabriele Minì, Francesco Pizzi, Andrea Rosso and four karting drivers.

==== 2021 ====
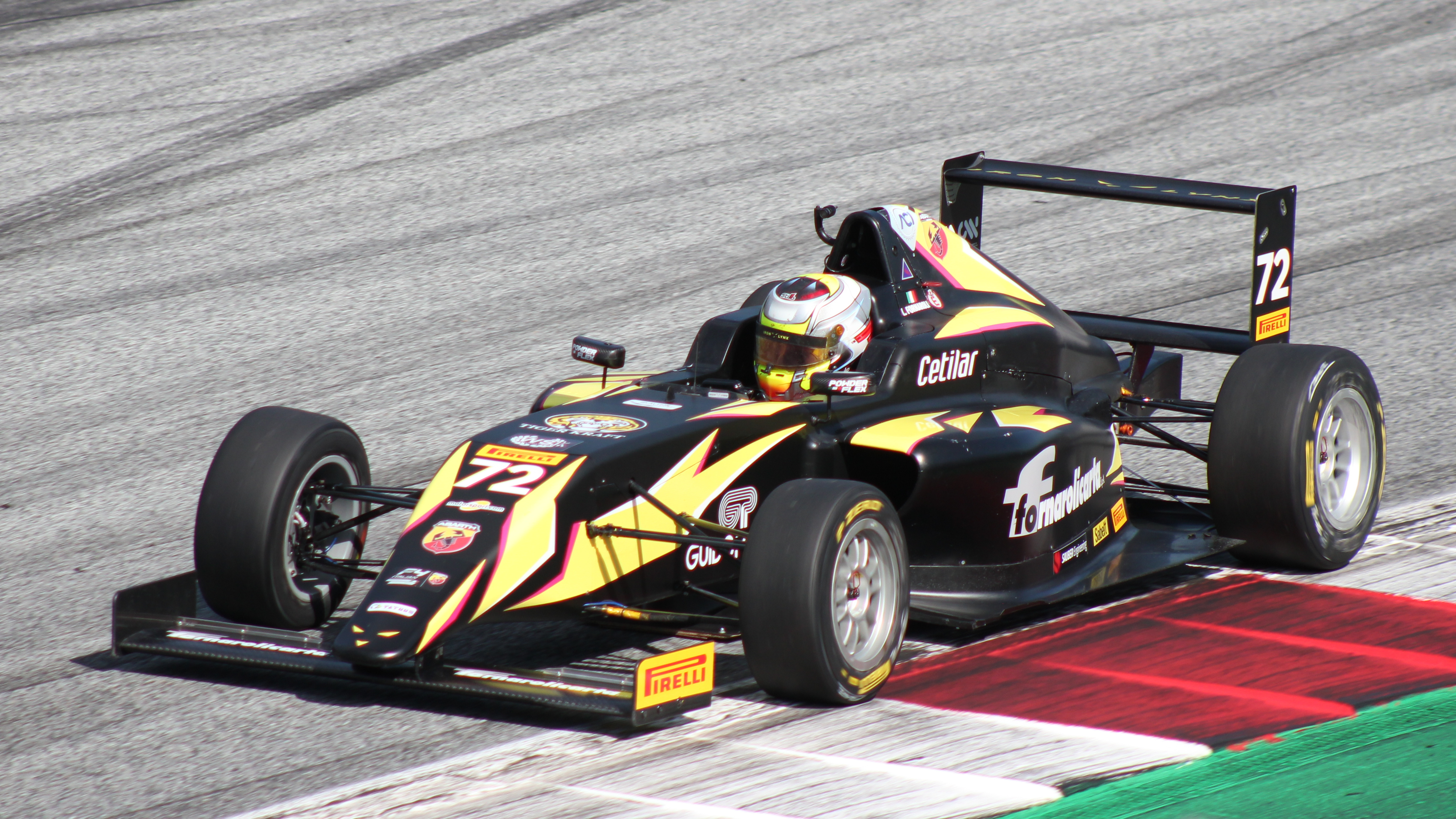
Fornaroli racing in the 2021 Italian F4 Championship.

In 2021, Fornaroli remained in the series with Iron Lynx, partnering new Ferrari Driver Academy recruit Maya Weug and Pietro Armanni. He was the highest-placed driver in the 2020 standings to return. Consistency would once again prove to be his biggest asset, as he was in the points in every race he finished. Two very strong weekends at Misano, where he clinched his first F4 victory from his first pole before scoring two further podiums, and Imola would initially see Fornaroli as the only real threat for eventual champion Oliver Bearman. He would however lose out shortly after, despite a second pole and more podiums at the Red Bull Ring and Mugello, and reached the season finale at Monza in third position, as part of a four-way fight for second. The weekend did not go to plan for him, as he faced a lowly ninth position, a retirement and a DNS that eventually dropped him to fifth in the standings, behind runner-up Tim Tramnitz and Prema's Kirill Smal and Sebastián Montoya. Fornaroli's closest teammate, Armanni, finished 23 places and 172 points behind him.

Fornaroli also took part in the ADAC Formula 4 with the team as a guest driver for the first two rounds. In those two rounds he competed in, he scored a high of third in the second race in Austria.

=== Formula Regional (2022) ===
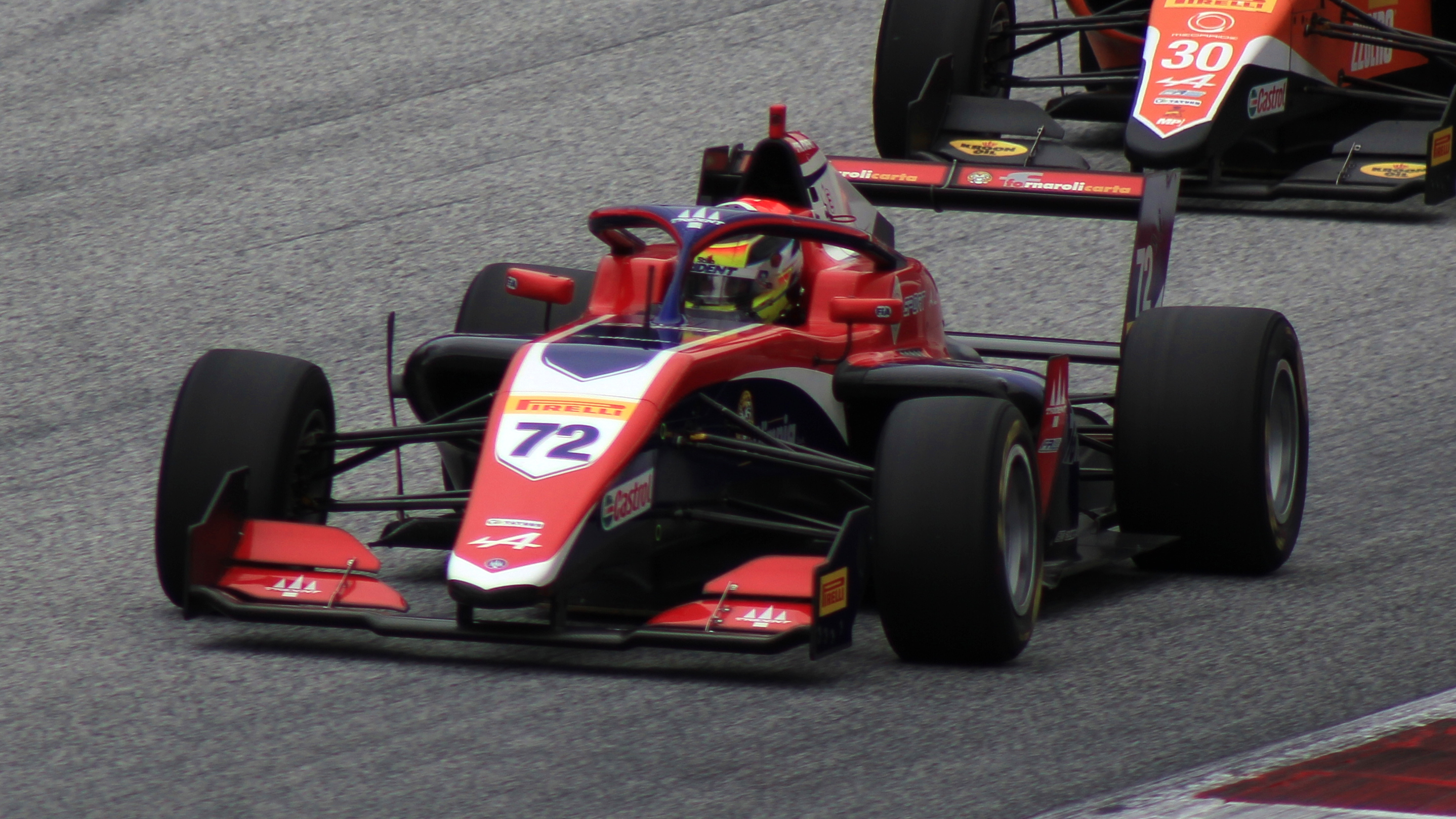
Fornaroli racing in the 2022 Formula Regional European Championship at the Red Bull Ring.

In 2022, Fornaroli made the step up to Formula Regional, first doing a partial campaign in the Asian Championship for Hitech Grand Prix, with a fourth-place qualifying result and a fifth-place finish as highlights, before returning to Europe for the main season with new team Trident, alongside F4 rival Tramnitz and Roman Bilinski. Consistency would prove to be the Italian's biggest trait, as he went on to score points in fifteen of the twenty races on his and his team's debut season. He finished 8th in the overall standings, as the best-placed rookie and well ahead of both of his teammates. His best finish was a fourth place in race one at the Hungaroring.

=== FIA Formula 3 (2023–2024) ===
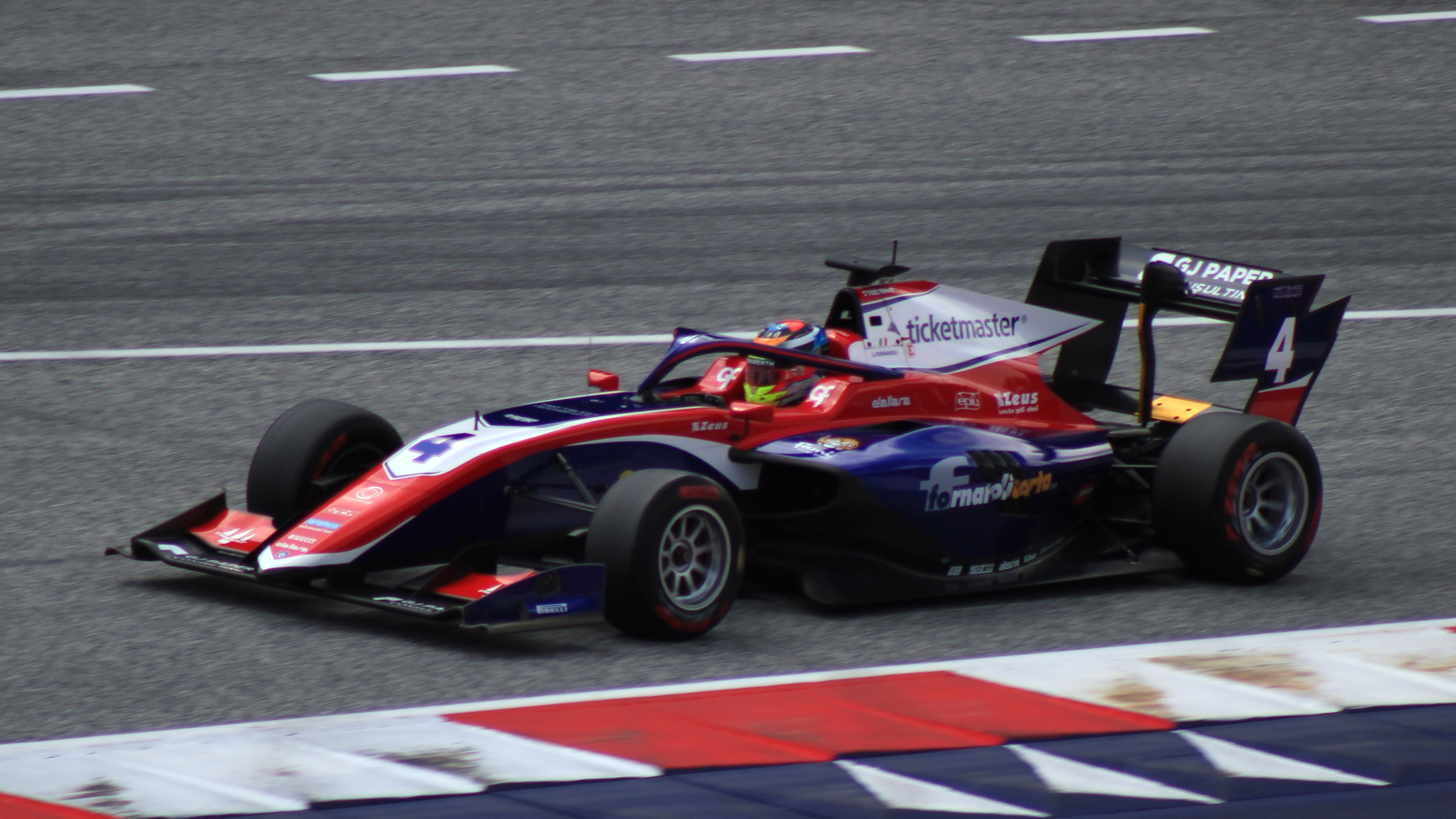
Fornaroli driving the Dallara F3 2019 during the 2023 Spielberg Formula 3 round.

==== 2023 ====
At the end of September 2022, Fornaroli partook in the FIA Formula 3 post-season test with Trident, partnering Oliver Goethe and FRECA rival Gabriel Bortoleto on all three days. On 3 December 2022, on his 18th birthday, it was announced that Fornaroli would be part of the team's 2023 line-up alongside Bortoleto and Goethe. He started his season with eighth in Bahrain, but was a victim of puncture in the feature race. He would prove his worth in Melbourne, where he qualified and finished fourth in the feature race. Fornaroli took his first podium with second in Monaco during the sprint race after holding off Grégoire Saucy. He followed it up with a third place during the Barcelona sprint race. He was on the hunt for more points in the feature race, but was pushed off-track by Luke Browning on the opening lap.

Fornaroli took his maiden pole position in Silverstone, forming a Trident 1-2 ahead of teammate Oliver Goethe. In the feature race, he would get bested by Goethe and fall to second place, but nevertheless grabbed a huge haul of points. He would qualify in the top-three in both Hungary and Spa-Francorchamps, but would only earn four points from the two rounds. After an eighth place during the sprint race in Monza, Fornaroli ranked 11th in the standings with 69 points, amassing three podiums and a pole position that year.

==== 2024: FIA Formula 3 Champion ====
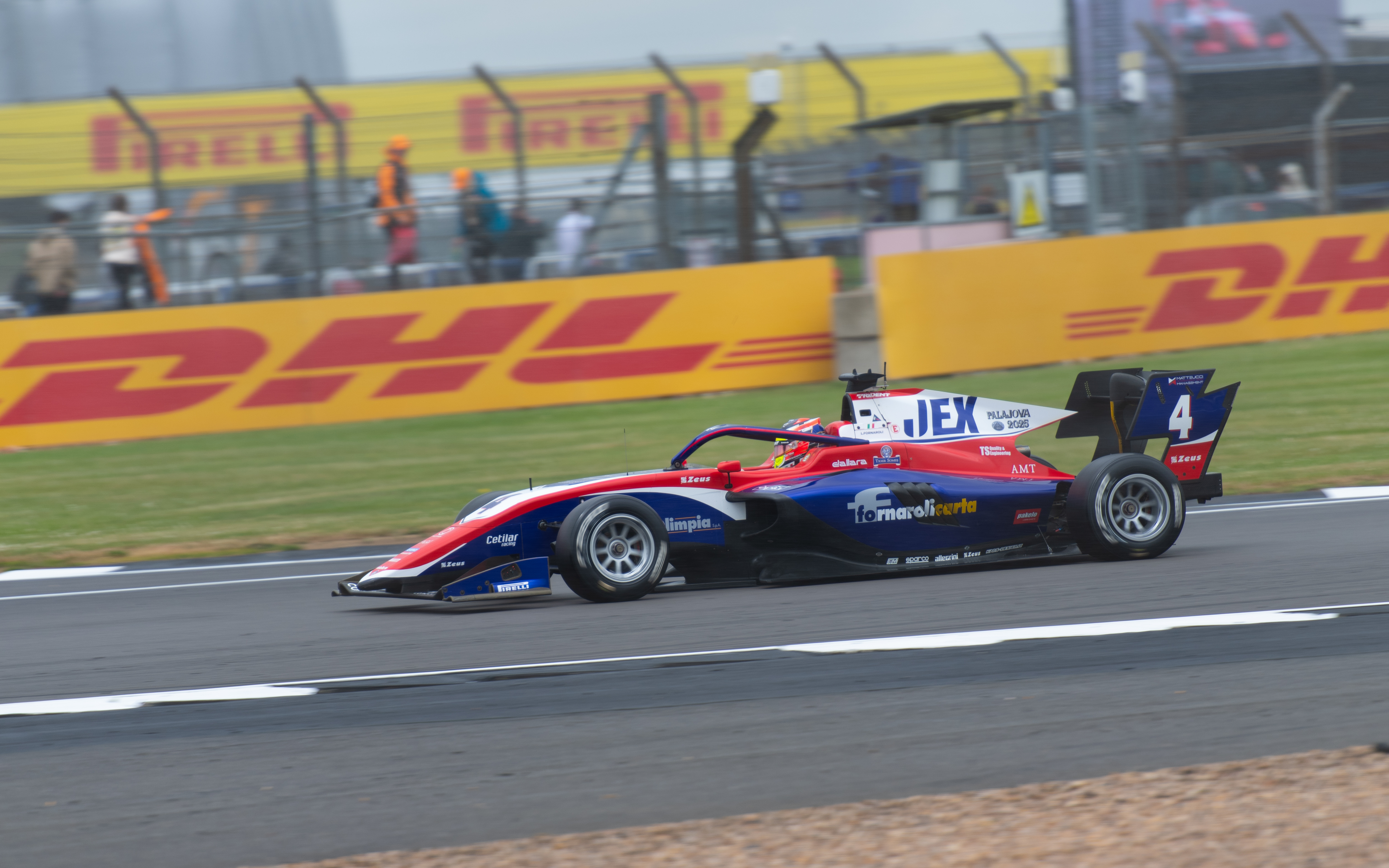
Fornaroli driving for Trident during the 2024 Silverstone Formula 3 round

Fornaroli and Trident continued their relationship together for the 2024 season. A podium in Bahrain came before a second place from pole at Melbourne, where Fornaroli lost the lead to Dino Beganovic at the midway point. The Imola feature race yielded another podium, though the Italian had to fight back to third from fifth after losing the race lead due to a sudden loss of power. More points came throughout the next four events, with a highlight being third place at Barcelona; Fornaroli was fourth overall going into the final three rounds of the season. Fornaroli remained consistent at Budapest and Spa, where he paired up respective points finishes in the sprint races with third-place finishes on both Sundays.

With these results, Fornaroli went into the season finale at Monza as the championship leader, sitting one point ahead of Gabriele Minì. His weekend started in perfect fashion, as he took his second pole position of the year, though the championship remained close following a scrappy race from both Fornaroli and Minì on Saturday. On the opening lap of the feature race Fornaroli lost the lead to Alex Dunne and would soon find himself fighting for the top five positions. Whilst Sami Meguetounif was able to clear his competitors for an eventual victory, Fornaroli would battle Minì and Christian Mansell until the penultimate lap, where his Italian title rival moved into second place; with Fornaroli in fourth and behind Mansell this would mean a title for Minì. In a last attempt on the final lap, Fornaroli threw his car down the inside of Mansell at the final corner, claiming third place without making contact and crossing the line to narrowly win the title. Minì was later disqualified for incorrect tyre pressures, meaning that Fornaroli inherited second. With this, Fornaroli became the first ever champion of FIA F3 or its predecessor GP3 to not win a race during the season, claiming the championship through his consistency and clean driving — he did not retire from any race during the season, only failing to score points in two races.

=== FIA Formula 2 (2024–2025) ===
==== 2024 ====
In November 2024, Fornaroli announced that he would make his Formula 2 debut early for the Yas Marina round with Rodin Motorsport in place of Zane Maloney, as the Barbadian had clashing Formula E commitments.

==== 2025 ====
Just days after clinching the 2024 FIA Formula 3 Championship, Fornaroli announced that he would step up to Formula 2 with Invicta Racing for 2025. Ahead of the season, he revealed that he would be balancing university studies alongside his rookie F2 campaign. Fornaroli began the season strongly in Melbourne, finishing second in the sprint race after starting on reverse pole losing the lead to Joshua Dürksen from reverse pole. He secured his maiden pole position in Bahrain, before finishing third in the feature race, after losing the lead early to Alex Dunne and successfully defending against a late challenge from Pepe Martí. He narrowly missed a third podium in as many rounds in Jeddah, finishing fourth in the feature race after failing to pass Victor Martins, having placed seventh in the sprint. Further points followed in Imola, although a slow stop in the feature race dropped him out of podium contention. In Monaco, Fornaroli avoided a mult-car collision on the opening lap from third on the grid, but finished second in the feature race after missing the pit window under a safety car, allowing Jak Crawford to pass him for the lead. The triple-header concluded on a frustrating note in Barcelona, where he scored only two points in the sprint race before receiving a stop-go penalty for a starting infringement in the feature and later retiring due to a loose wheel.

Fornaroli secured his second pole in Austria, but suffered a second consecutive retirement after being caught in a multi-car collision on the final lap of the sprint race. In the feature race, he led the opening stages before losing positions during the pit cycle, although he recovered to finish third following a prolonged battle with Martí; he was later promoted to second after Alex Dunne was disqualified. His breakthrough came in Silverstone, qualifying tenth which put him on reverse pole for the sprint. Despite pressure from Kush Maini at the start, Fornaroli held the lead throughout, proceeding to take his first single-seater win in four years. He finished sixth in the feature race, before claiming another sprint win in Spa-Francorchamps after a decisive start from third on the grid. A fifth place in a wet feature race moved him into the championship lead. He qualified second in Hungary behind teammate Roman Staněk. After finishing fifth in the sprint, Fornaroli managed to overcut teammate Staněk during the feature race pit cycle and went on to seal his first feature race victory, despite a five-second penalty for speeding in the pit lane. Team principal James Robinson remarked that it was "mind-blowing" that Fornaroli—who led by 17 points ahead of the summer break—was not affiliated with a Formula One team.

Fornaroli continued his strong form in Monza, where he won the sprint after a decisive pass on Dino Beganovic for the lead. He added a fifth place finish in the feature race. After qualifying second in Baku, he recorded a pair of fifth-place finishes across the weekend; he briefly led the feature race before dropping positions during the pit cycle and later received a penalty for contact with Dunne. He inherited pole position in Qatar following a penalty for Oliver Goethe. After finishing sixth in the sprint, a second-place in the feature race secured Fornaroli the championship with a round to spare, becoming the fifth champion in the FIA Formula 2 era to win the F3 and F2 titles in consecutive years. Despite qualifying third for the Yas Marina finale, he endured his only non-scoring weekend of the year after a safety car compromised his alternate strategy in the feature race.

Fornaroli concluded the season as champion with four wins from nine podiums, and three poles, also helping Invicta Racing secure back-to-back titles. Fornaroli additionally received the Anthoine Hubert Award as the top rookie, while Formula Scout ranked him as the best driver in junior formulae throughout 2025.

== Formula E ==
In 2025, Fornaroli made his Formula E debut during the Berlin rookie test at the Tempelhof Airport Street Circuit with Jaguar TCS Racing.

== Formula One ==
After winning the 2025 Formula 2 title, McLaren announced that Fornaroli would be signed to their driver development programme. A month later, he was announced to be McLaren's reserve driver for the 2026 season, alongside Pato O'Ward. In March, he completed his maiden test in a Formula One car at the Circuit de Barcelona-Catalunya, driving the McLaren MCL60. He made further appearances with the MCL60 in the next two months at Silverstone and in the Circuit of the Americas. Fornaroli made his first Friday free practice session debut with the team at the Barcelona-Catalunya Grand Prix, finishing an impressive fifth, just six tenths adrift of teammate Oscar Piastri. The following week, he drove the MCL60 again at Monza, before testing for the Haas F1 Team in the VF-25 at Circuito de Jerez over two days. Fornaroli made his second free practice outing with McLaren at the Hungarian Grand Prix, before driving the MCL60 a week later during a TPC test at the Algarve International Circuit. He made further free practice appearances at the Mexico City and São Paulo Grand Prix.

== Endurance racing career ==
=== FIA World Endurance Championship ===
In October of 2026, Fornaroli was signed by the McLaren Hypercar Team as one of its full-time drivers for its debut season in the 2027 FIA World Endurance Championship.

== Karting record ==
=== Karting career summary ===
Season	Series	Team	Position
2016	South Garda Winter Cup — Mini ROK		NC
2017	IAME International Open — X30 Junior		NC†
2017	IAME International Final — X30 Junior		5th
2018	South Garda Winter Cup — OKJ	Team Driver Racing Kart	NC
2018	WSK Super Master Series — OKJ	Team Driver Racing Kart	NC
2018	Italian Championship — X30 Junior	Team Driver Racing Kart	3rd
2018	CIK-FIA European Championship — OKJ	Team Driver Racing Kart	NC†
2018	WSK Open Cup — OKJ	Team Driver Racing Kart	NC
2018	IAME International Final — X30 Junior	Team Driver Racing Kart	3rd
2018	WSK Final Cup — OKJ	Team Driver Racing Kart	NC†
2019	Italian Championship — X30 Senior	Team Driver Racing Kart	5th
2019	Andrea Margutti Trophy — OK	Team Driver Racing Kart	3rd
2019	WSK Euro Series — OK	Team Driver Racing Kart	18th
2019	IAME Euro Series — X30 Senior	Team Driver Racing Kart	46th
2019	CIK-FIA European Championship — OK	Team Driver Racing Kart	NC
2019	IAME International Final — X30 Senior	Team Driver Racing Kart	NC

== Racing record ==
=== Racing career summary ===
Season	Series	Team	Races	Wins	Poles	F/Laps	Podiums	Points	Position
2020	Italian F4 Championship	Iron Lynx	20	0	0	1	2	108	9th
2020	ADAC Formula 4 Championship	Iron Lynx	3	0	0	0	0	0	NC†
2021	Italian F4 Championship	Iron Lynx	20	1	2	3	7	180	5th
2021	ADAC Formula 4 Championship	Iron Lynx	6	0	0	0	1	0	NC†
2022	Formula Regional Asian Championship	Hitech Grand Prix	9	0	0	0	0	22	17th
2022	Formula Regional European Championship	Trident	20	0	0	0	0	83	8th
2023	FIA Formula 3 Championship	Trident	18	0	1	0	3	69	11th
2024	FIA Formula 3 Championship	Trident	20	0	2	2	7	153	**1st**
2024	FIA Formula 2 Championship	Rodin Motorsport	2	0	0	0	0	0	29th
2025	FIA Formula 2 Championship	Invicta Racing	27	4	3	0	9	211	**1st**
2026	Formula One	McLaren Mastercard F1 Team	Reserve driver						
2027	FIA World Endurance Championship – Hypercar	McLaren Hypercar Team	0	0	0	0	0	0	TBD

* Season still in progress.

=== Complete Italian F4 Championship results ===
(key) (Races in bold indicate pole position) (Races in italics indicate fastest lap)

Year	Team	1	2	3	4	5	6	7	8	9	10	11	12	13	14	15	16	17	18	19	20	21	DC	Points
2020	Iron Lynx	MIS; 1; 4	MIS; 2; 15	MIS; 3; 9	IMO1; 1; 17	IMO1; 2; 17	IMO1; 3; 5	RBR; 1; 13	RBR; 2; 26	RBR; 3; 10	MUG; 1; 5	MUG; 2; 12	MUG; 3; 14	MNZ; 1; 4	MNZ; 2; 4	MNZ; 3; 3	IMO2; 1; 4	IMO2; 2; 5	IMO2; 3; 6	VLL; 1; 8	VLL; 2 C	VLL; 3; 16	9th	108
2021	Iron Lynx	LEC; 1; 7	LEC; 2; 8	LEC; 3; 4	**MIS**; **1**; 1	MIS; 2; 3	MIS; 3; 2	VLL; 1; 10	VLL; 2; 8	VLL; 3; 8	IMO; 1 Ret	IMO; 2; 2	IMO; 3; 2	RBR; 1; 6	**RBR**; **2**; 2	RBR; 3; 7	MUG; 1 Ret	MUG; 2; 8	MUG; 3; 2	MNZ; 1; 9	MNZ; 2 Ret	MNZ; 3 DNS	5th	180

=== Complete ADAC Formula 4 Championship results ===
(key) (Races in bold indicate pole position) (Races in italics indicate fastest lap)

Year	Team	1	2	3	4	5	6	7	8	9	10	11	12	13	14	15	16	17	18	19	20	21	Pos	Points
2020	Iron Lynx	LAU1; 1	LAU1; 2	LAU1; 3	NÜR1; 1	NÜR1; 2	NÜR1; 3	HOC; 1; 11	HOC; 2; 13	HOC; 3; 12	NÜR2; 1	NÜR2; 2	NÜR2; 3	RBR; 1	RBR; 2	RBR; 3	LAU2; 1	LAU2; 2	LAU2; 3	OSC; 1	OSC; 2	OSC; 3	NC†	0
2021	Iron Lynx	RBR; 1; 5	RBR; 2; 3	RBR; 3; 11	ZAN; 1 Ret	ZAN; 2; 13	ZAN; 3; 8	NÜR; 1	NÜR; 2	NÜR; 3	HOC1; 1	HOC1; 2	HOC1; 3	SAC; 1	SAC; 2	SAC; 3	HOC2; 1	HOC2; 2	HOC2; 3				NC†	0

^{†} As Fornaroli was a guest driver, he was ineligible for points.

=== Complete Formula Regional Asian Championship results ===
(key) (Races in bold indicate pole position) (Races in italics indicate the fastest lap of top ten finishers)

Year	Entrant	1	2	3	4	5	6	7	8	9	10	11	12	13	14	15	DC	Points
2022	Hitech Grand Prix	ABU; 1; 8	ABU; 2; 5	ABU; 3; 22†	DUB; 1; 11	DUB; 2; 8	DUB; 3; 11	DUB; 1; 9	DUB; 2; 26†	DUB; 3; 9	DUB; 1	DUB; 2	DUB; 3	ABU; 1	ABU; 2	ABU; 3	17th	22

=== Complete Formula Regional European Championship results ===
(key) (Races in bold indicate pole position) (Races in italics indicate fastest lap)

Year	Team	1	2	3	4	5	6	7	8	9	10	11	12	13	14	15	16	17	18	19	20	DC	Points
2022	Trident	MNZ; 1; 10	MNZ; 2; 15	IMO; 1; 8	IMO; 2; 8	MCO; 1; 9	MCO; 2; 12	LEC; 1; 20	LEC; 2; 23	ZAN; 1; 8	ZAN; 2; 5	HUN; 1; 4	HUN; 2; 5	SPA; 1; 6	SPA; 2; 8	RBR; 1; 19	RBR; 2; 10	CAT; 1; 9	CAT; 2; 8	MUG; 1; 5	MUG; 2; 8	8th	83

=== Complete FIA Formula 3 Championship results ===
(key) (Races in bold indicate pole position) (Races in italics indicate points for the fastest lap of the top ten finishers)

Year	Entrant	1	2	3	4	5	6	7	8	9	10	11	12	13	14	15	16	17	18	19	20	DC	Points
2023	Trident	BHR; SPR; 8	BHR; FEA; 27	MEL; SPR; 7	MEL; FEA; 4	MON; SPR; 2	MON; FEA; 24	CAT; SPR; 3	CAT; FEA; NC	RBR; SPR; 15	RBR; FEA; 10	SIL; SPR; 7	**SIL**; **FEA**; 2	HUN; SPR; 13	HUN; FEA; 9	SPA; SPR; 9	SPA; FEA; 14	MNZ; SPR; 8	MNZ; FEA; 15			11th	69
2024	Trident	BHR; SPR; 3	BHR; FEA; 7	MEL; SPR; 9	**MEL**; **FEA**; 2	IMO; SPR; 11	IMO; FEA; 3	MON; SPR; 9	MON; FEA; 5	CAT; SPR; 7	CAT; FEA; 3	RBR; SPR; 12	RBR; FEA; 9	SIL; SPR; 10	SIL; FEA; 7	HUN; SPR; 7	HUN; FEA; 3	SPA; SPR; 9	SPA; FEA; 3	MNZ; SPR; 8	**MNZ**; **FEA**; 2	1st	153

=== Complete FIA Formula 2 Championship results ===
(key) (Races in bold indicate pole position) (Races in italics indicate fastest lap)

Year	Entrant	1	2	3	4	5	6	7	8	9	10	11	12	13	14	15	16	17	18	19	20	21	22	23	24	25	26	27	28	DC	Points
2024	Rodin Motorsport	BHR; SPR	BHR; FEA	JED; SPR	JED; FEA	MEL; SPR	MEL; FEA	IMO; SPR	IMO; FEA	MON; SPR	MON; FEA	CAT; SPR	CAT; FEA	RBR; SPR	RBR; FEA	SIL; SPR	SIL; FEA	HUN; SPR	HUN; FEA	SPA; SPR	SPA; FEA	MNZ; SPR	MNZ; FEA	BAK; SPR	BAK; FEA	LSL; SPR	LSL; FEA	YMC; SPR; 10	YMC; FEA; 13	29th	0
2025	Invicta Racing	MEL; SPR; 2	MEL; FEA; C	BHR; SPR; 8	**BHR**; **FEA**; 3	JED; SPR; 7	JED; FEA; 4	IMO; SPR; 7	IMO; FEA; 5	MON; SPR; 7	MON; FEA; 2	CAT; SPR; 7	CAT; FEA; 21†	RBR; SPR; 16†	**RBR**; **FEA**; 2	SIL; SPR; 1	SIL; FEA; 6	SPA; SPR; 1	SPA; FEA; 5	HUN; SPR; 5	HUN; FEA; 1	MNZ; SPR; 1	MNZ; FEA; 5	BAK; SPR; 5	BAK; FEA; 5	LSL; SPR; 6	**LSL**; **FEA**; 2	YMC; SPR; 17	YMC; FEA; 11	1st	211

=== Complete Formula One participations ===
(key) (Races in bold indicate pole position) (Races in italics indicate fastest lap)

Year	Entrant	Chassis	Engine	1	2	3	4	5	6	7	8	9	10	11	12	13	14	15	16	17	18	19	20	21	22	23	WDC	Points
2026	McLaren Mastercard F1 Team	McLaren MCL40	Mercedes-AMG M17 E Performance 1.6 V6 t	AUS	CHN	JPN	MIA	CAN	MON	BCN; TD	AUT	GBR	BEL	HUN; TD	NED	ITA	ESP	AZE	BHR	SIN	USA	MXC; TD	SAP; TD	LVG	QAT	ABU	–	–

Sporting positions
Preceded by Isack Hadjar	Formula Regional European Championship; Rookie Champion; 2022	Succeeded by Martinius Stenshorne
Preceded by Gabriel Bortoleto	FIA Formula 3 Championship; Champion; 2024	Succeeded by Rafael Câmara
Preceded by Gabriel Bortoleto	FIA Formula 2 Championship; Champion; 2025	Incumbent
