= 2025 Spielberg Formula 2 round =

Motor racing event

(Austria) 2025 Spielberg Formula 2 round
Round details
- Round 7 of 14 in the 2025 FIA Formula 2 Championship.
- Layout of the Red Bull Ring
- Location: Red Bull Ring; Spielberg, Styria, Austria
- Course: Permanent racing facility 4.318 km (2.683 mi)

Sprint Race
- Date: 28 June 2025
- Laps: 28
Podium
First	(Spain) Pepe Martí	Campos Racing
Second	(Paraguay) Joshua Dürksen	AIX Racing
Third	(Czech Republic) Roman Staněk	Invicta Racing
Fastest lap
Driver	(India) Kush Maini	DAMS Lucas Oil
- Time: 1:18.589 (on lap 25)

Feature Race
- Date: 29 June 2025
- Laps: 40
Pole position
Driver	(Italy) Leonardo Fornaroli	Invicta Racing
Time	1:15.229	
Podium
First	(Netherlands) Richard Verschoor	MP Motorsport
Second	(Italy) Leonardo Fornaroli	Invicta Racing
Third	(United States) Jak Crawford	DAMS Lucas Oil
Fastest lap
Driver	(Colombia) Sebastián Montoya	Prema Racing
- Time: 1:18.160 (on lap 33)

The 2025 Spielberg FIA Formula 2 round was a motor racing event held between 27 and 29 June 2025 at the Red Bull Ring. It was the seventh round of the 2025 FIA Formula 2 Championship and was held in support of the 2025 Austrian Grand Prix.

== Report ==
=== Qualifying ===
Leonardo Fornaroli qualified on pole position for the feature race, making him the first driver to take multiple pole positions in 2025, with John Bennett taking reverse-grid pole for the sprint race.

=== Sprint race ===
Bennett lost the lead to Joshua Dürksen at the start. The race was red-flagged on lap 2 after Sami Meguetounif collided with Arvid Lindblad and Luke Browning, with his car landing upside-down on the track. Pepe Martí overtook Dürksen for the lead on lap 19, and held it until the end of the race, with Roman Staněk crossing the line in third. Amaury Cordeel looked set to finish fourth, but spun on the final lap, with Gabriele Minì, Bennett and Fornaroli all coming to a stop behind his stricken car.

=== Feature race ===
Fornaroli held the lead at the start of the feature race. Of the front-runner, Victor Martins was the first to change tyres, followed by Richard Verschoor and Fornaroli, who fell behind both. Alex Dunne, who started seventh, also overtook Fornaroli on lap 10. Verschoor was able to pass Martins for the lead on lap 15, where he remained for the rest of the race. Dunne and Fornaroli also passed Martins to complete the podium. However, Dunne was disqualified after the race for excessive plank wear, with Jak Crawford inheriting the final podium position after starting fourteenth. Verschoor left the round in the championship lead, 24 points ahead of Dunne and Crawford with a further two points adrift in third.

== Classification ==
=== Qualifying ===
Qualifying was held on 27 June 2025, at 15:55 local time (UTC+2).

Pos.	No.	Driver	Entrant	Time/Gap	Grid SR	Grid FR
1	1	(Italy) Leonardo Fornaroli	Invicta Racing	1:15.229	10	1
2	14	(France) Victor Martins	ART Grand Prix	+0.014	9	2
3	6	(Netherlands) Richard Verschoor	MP Motorsport	+0.024	8	3
4	10	(Italy) Gabriele Minì	Prema Racing	+0.171	7	4
5	16	(Belgium) Amaury Cordeel	Rodin Motorsport	+0.188	6	5
6	2	(Czech Republic) Roman Staněk	Invicta Racing	+0.202	4	6
7	17	(Republic of Ireland) Alex Dunne	Rodin Motorsport	+0.214	3	7
8	20	(Paraguay) Joshua Dürksen	AIX Racing	+0.251	2	8
9	3	(Spain) Pepe Martí	Campos Racing	+0.258	5^{1}	12^{1}
10	24	(United Kingdom) John Bennett	Van Amersfoort Racing	+0.296	1	9
11	9	(Colombia) Sebastián Montoya	Prema Racing	+0.298	11	10
12	4	(United Kingdom) Arvid Lindblad	Campos Racing	+0.317	15^{1}	15^{1}
13	15	(Japan) Ritomo Miyata	ART Grand Prix	+0.345	12	11
14	22	(France) Sami Meguetounif	Trident	+0.422	13	13
15	11	(United States) Jak Crawford	DAMS Lucas Oil	+0.528	DNS	14
16	5	(Germany) Oliver Goethe	MP Motorsport	+0.552	16	16
17	7	(United Kingdom) Luke Browning	Hitech TGR	+0.572	17	17
18	12	(India) Kush Maini	DAMS Lucas Oil	+0.649	18	18
19	23	(United States) Max Esterson	Trident	+0.783	19	19
20	25	(Mexico) Rafael Villagómez	Van Amersfoort Racing	+0.808	20	20
21	8	(Sweden) Dino Beganovic	Hitech TGR	+0.861	21	21
22	21	(United Kingdom) Cian Shields	AIX Racing	+1.326	22	22

Notes:

- ^1Pepe Martí and Arvid Lindblad both received three-place grid penalties for both races for impeding other drivers during qualifying.

=== Sprint race ===
The sprint race was held on 28 June 2025, at 14:15 local time (UTC+2).

Pos.	No.	Driver	Entrant	Laps	Time/Retired	Grid	Points
1	3	(Spain) Pepe Martí	Campos Racing	28	1:11:03.819	5	10
2	20	(Paraguay) Joshua Dürksen	AIX Racing	28	+2.983	2	8
3	2	(Czech Republic) Roman Staněk	Invicta Racing	28	+3.247	4	6+1
4	6	(Netherlands) Richard Verschoor	MP Motorsport	28	+7.265	8	5
5	9	(Colombia) Sebastián Montoya	Prema Racing	28	+8.392	11	4
6	17	(Republic of Ireland) Alex Dunne	Rodin Motorsport	28	+14.320^{1}	3	3
7	14	(France) Victor Martins	ART Grand Prix	28	+14.371	9	2
8	15	(Japan) Ritomo Miyata	ART Grand Prix	28	+14.579	12	1
9	25	(Mexico) Rafael Villagómez	Van Amersfoort Racing	28	+18.936	20	
10	23	(United States) Max Esterson	Trident	28	+19.964	19	
11	5	(Germany) Oliver Goethe	MP Motorsport	28	+21.445^{2}	16	
12	21	(United Kingdom) Cian Shields	AIX Racing	28	+23.930	22	
13†	16	(Belgium) Amaury Cordeel	Rodin Motorsport	27	Collision	6	
14†	10	(Italy) Gabriele Minì	Prema Racing	27	Collision	7	
15†	24	(United Kingdom) John Bennett	Van Amersfoort Racing	27	Collision	1	
16†	1	(Italy) Leonardo Fornaroli	Invicta Racing	27	Collision	10	
17	12	(India) Kush Maini	DAMS Lucas Oil	26	+2 laps	18	
DNF	8	(Sweden) Dino Beganovic	Hitech TGR	4	Collision	21	
DNF	7	(United Kingdom) Luke Browning	Hitech TGR	1	Collision	17	
DNF	4	(United Kingdom) Arvid Lindblad	Campos Racing	1	Collision	15	
DNF	22	(France) Sami Meguetounif	Trident	1	Collision	13	
DNS	11	(United States) Jak Crawford	DAMS Lucas Oil	0	Mechanical	DNS	
Fastest lap: (India) Kush Maini (1:18.589 on lap 25)

† Drivers did not finish the race but were classified in the standings.

Notes:

- ^1Alex Dunne received a five-second time penalty for a false start, which did not affect his finishing position.
- ^2Oliver Goethe received a ten-second time penalty for causing a collision, demoting him from 6th to 11th.
- Kush Maini set the fastest lap, but did not finish within the top ten so did not receive the bonus point. Roman Staněk set the fastest lap within the top ten and received the bonus point.

=== Feature race ===
The feature race was held on 29 June 2025, at 10:00 local time (UTC+2).

Pos.	No.	Driver	Entrant	Laps	Time/Retired	Grid	Points
1	6	(Netherlands) Richard Verschoor	MP Motorsport	40	53:36.455	3	25
2	1	(Italy) Leonardo Fornaroli	Invicta Racing	40	+9.743	1	18+2
3	11	(United States) Jak Crawford	DAMS Lucas Oil	40	+17.171	14	15
4	9	(Colombia) Sebastián Montoya	Prema Racing	40	+18.303	10	12+1
5	7	(United Kingdom) Luke Browning	Hitech TGR	40	+19.975	17	10
6	3	(Spain) Pepe Martí	Campos Racing	40	+20.696^{1}	12	8
7	14	(France) Victor Martins	ART Grand Prix	40	+20.744	2	6
8	2	(Czech Republic) Roman Staněk	Invicta Racing	40	+20.952	4	4
9	8	(Sweden) Dino Beganovic	Hitech TGR	40	+24.021	21	2
10	22	(France) Sami Meguetounif	Trident	40	+29.972	13	1
11	25	(Mexico) Rafael Villagómez	Van Amersfoort Racing	40	+36.808	20	
12	4	(United Kingdom) Arvid Lindblad	Campos Racing	40	+42.303^{1}	15	
13	20	(Paraguay) Joshua Dürksen	AIX Racing	40	+42.449	8	
14	24	(United Kingdom) John Bennett	Van Amersfoort Racing	40	+47.973^{1}	9	
15	23	(United States) Max Esterson	Trident	40	+49.109	19	
16	12	(India) Kush Maini	DAMS Lucas Oil	40	+1:18.706	18	
17	5	(Germany) Oliver Goethe	MP Motorsport	39	Accident	16	
DNF	21	(United Kingdom) Cian Shields	AIX Racing	25	Retired	22	
DNF	16	(Belgium) Amaury Cordeel	Rodin Motorsport	10	Engine	5	
DNF	10	(Italy) Gabriele Minì	Prema Racing	0	Engine	4	
DNF	15	(Japan) Ritomo Miyata	ART Grand Prix	0	Retired	11	
DSQ	17	(Republic of Ireland) Alex Dunne	Rodin Motorsport	DSQ	Plank wear^{2}	7	
Fastest lap: (Colombia) Sebastián Montoya (1:18.160 on lap 33)

Notes:

- ^1Pepe Martí, Arvid Lindblad and John Bennett all received ten-second penalties for causing collisions. Martí was demoted from 3rd to 6th, Lindblad was demoted from 11th to 12th, and Bennett was demoted from 12th to 14th.
- ^2Alex Dunne was disqualified from the race for excessive plank wear. He originally finished second.

== Standings after the event ==
Drivers' Championship standings

	Pos.	Driver	Points
1	1	(Netherlands) Richard Verschoor	114
1	2	(Republic of Ireland) Alex Dunne	90
1	3	(United States) Jak Crawford	88
2	4	(Italy) Leonardo Fornaroli	86
	5	(United Kingdom) Luke Browning	83

Teams' Championship standings

	Pos.	Team	Points
	1	(Spain) Campos Racing	146
1	2	(Netherlands) MP Motorsport	126
1	3	(United Kingdom) Hitech TGR	114
	4	(France) DAMS Lucas Oil	109
1	5	(United Kingdom) Invicta Racing	109

Note: Only the top five positions are included for both sets of standings.

== See also ==
- 2025 Austrian Grand Prix
- 2025 Spielberg Formula 3 round

Previous round: 2025 Barcelona Formula 2 round	FIA Formula 2 Championship; 2025 season	Next round: 2025 Silverstone Formula 2 round
Previous round: 2024 Spielberg Formula 2 round	Spielberg Formula 2 round	Next round: 2026 Spielberg Formula 2 round
