= 2025 Barcelona Formula 2 round =

Motor racing event

(Spain) 2025 Barcelona Formula 2 round
Round details
- Round 6 of 14 in the 2025 FIA Formula 2 Championship.
- Layout of the Circuit de Barcelona-Catalunya
- Location: Circuit de Barcelona-Catalunya; Montmeló, Catalonia, Spain
- Course: Permanent racing facility 4.657 km (2.894 mi)

Sprint Race
- Date: 31 May 2025
- Laps: 26
Podium
First	(Netherlands) Richard Verschoor	MP Motorsport
Second	(Republic of Ireland) Alex Dunne	Rodin Motorsport
Third	(Mexico) Rafael Villagómez	Van Amersfoort Racing
Fastest lap
Driver	(Republic of Ireland) Alex Dunne	Rodin Motorsport
- Time: 1:29.506 (on lap 25)

Feature Race
- Date: 1 June 2025
- Laps: 37
Pole position
Driver	(United Kingdom) Arvid Lindblad	Campos Racing
Time	1:25.180	
Podium
First	(United Kingdom) Arvid Lindblad	Campos Racing
Second	(Colombia) Sebastián Montoya	Prema Racing
Third	(Netherlands) Richard Verschoor	MP Motorsport
Fastest lap
Driver	(Republic of Ireland) Alex Dunne	Rodin Motorsport
- Time: 1:29.179 (on lap 27)

The 2025 Barcelona FIA Formula 2 round was a motor racing event held between 30 May and 1 June 2025 at the Circuit de Barcelona-Catalunya. It was the sixth round of the 2025 FIA Formula 2 Championship and was held in support of the 2025 Spanish Grand Prix.

Richard Verschoor won the sprint race after making a stop under safety car for fresh tyres. Alex Dunne recovered from 19th on the grid to second position after being given two grid penalties, and Rafael Villagómez claimed his maiden F2 podium in third. Arvid Lindblad won the feature race from pole position, followed by Sebastián Montoya and Verschoor. Jak Crawford finished fourth, with a late safety car preventing him and other alternate strategy runners from challenging the podium-sitters. Dunne left the round as the championship leader, three points ahead of Verschoor.

== Classification ==
=== Qualifying ===
Qualifying was held on 30 May 2025, at 15:55 local time (UTC+2).

Pos.	No.	Driver	Entrant	Time/Gap	Grid SR	Grid FR
1	4	(United Kingdom) Arvid Lindblad	Campos Racing	1:25.180	9	1
2	9	(Colombia) Sebastián Montoya	Prema Racing	+0.245	8	2
3	12	(India) Kush Maini	DAMS Lucas Oil	+0.330	7	3
4	2	(Czech Republic) Roman Staněk	Invicta Racing	+0.339	6	4
5	17	(Republic of Ireland) Alex Dunne	Rodin Motorsport	+0.432	19^{1}	8^{1}
6	6	(Netherlands) Richard Verschoor	MP Motorsport	+0.478	5	5
7	11	(United States) Jak Crawford	DAMS Lucas Oil	+0.548	4	6
8	7	(United Kingdom) Luke Browning	Hitech TGR	+0.562	3	7
9	20	(Paraguay) Joshua Dürksen	AIX Racing	+0.570	2	9
10	1	(Italy) Leonardo Fornaroli	Invicta Racing	+0.575	1	10
11	3	(Spain) Pepe Martí	Campos Racing	+0.590	10	11
12	8	(Sweden) Dino Beganovic	Hitech TGR	+0.605	11	12
13	5	(Germany) Oliver Goethe	MP Motorsport	+0.630	12	13
14	15	(Japan) Ritomo Miyata	ART Grand Prix	+0.636	13	14
15	14	(France) Victor Martins	ART Grand Prix	+0.680	14	15
16	23	(United States) Max Esterson	Trident	+0.702	15	16
17	16	(Belgium) Amaury Cordeel	Rodin Motorsport	+0.802	16	17
18	10	(Italy) Gabriele Minì	Prema Racing	+1.020	17	18
19	22	(France) Sami Meguetounif	Trident	+1.080	18	19
20	21	(United Kingdom) Cian Shields	AIX Racing	+1.146	20	20
21	24	(United Kingdom) John Bennett	Van Amersfoort Racing	+1.181	21	21
22	25	(Mexico) Rafael Villagómez	Van Amersfoort Racing	+1.716	22	22

Notes:

- ^1 Alex Dunne was given a ten-place grid penalty for the sprint race for causing a collision in the previous round. In addition, he received a three-place grid penalty for both races for causing a collision in practice.

=== Sprint race ===
The sprint race was held on 31 May 2025, at 14:15 local time (UTC+2).

Pos.	No.	Driver	Entrant	Laps	Time/Retired	Grid	Points
1	6	(Netherlands) Richard Verschoor	MP Motorsport	26	42:00.288	5	10
2	17	(Republic of Ireland) Alex Dunne	Rodin Motorsport	26	+0.380	19	8 (1)
3	25	(Mexico) Rafael Villagómez	Van Amersfoort Racing	26	+8.334	22	6
4	11	(United States) Jak Crawford	DAMS Lucas Oil	26	+11.473	4	5
5	14	(France) Victor Martins	ART Grand Prix	26	+12.504	14	4
6	7	(United Kingdom) Luke Browning	Hitech TGR	26	+13.365	3	3
7	1	(Italy) Leonardo Fornaroli	Invicta Racing	26	+14.071	1	2
8	4	(United Kingdom) Arvid Lindblad	Campos Racing	26	+14.325	9	1
9	22	(France) Sami Meguetounif	Trident	26	+16.494	18	
10	16	(Belgium) Amaury Cordeel	Rodin Motorsport	26	+16.610	16	
11	9	(Colombia) Sebastián Montoya	Prema Racing	26	+16.619^{1}	8	
12	21	(United Kingdom) Cian Shields	AIX Racing	26	+19.516	20	
13	15	(Japan) Ritomo Miyata	ART Grand Prix	26	+20.245	13	
14	3	(Spain) Pepe Martí	Campos Racing	26	+21.358	10	
15	8	(Sweden) Dino Beganovic	Hitech TGR	26	+23.006	11	
16	12	(India) Kush Maini	DAMS Lucas Oil	26	+23.818	7	
17	2	(Czech Republic) Roman Staněk	Invicta Racing	26	+24.161	6	
18	5	(Germany) Oliver Goethe	MP Motorsport	26	+24.763	12	
19	23	(United States) Max Esterson	Trident	25	+1 lap	15	
NC	20	(Paraguay) Joshua Dürksen	AIX Racing	22	+4 laps	2	
DNF	10	(Italy) Gabriele Minì	Prema Racing	17	Collision	17	
DNF	24	(United Kingdom) John Bennett	Van Amersfoort Racing	1	Retired	21	
Fastest lap: (Republic of Ireland) Alex Dunne (1:29.506 on lap 25)

Notes:

- ^1 Sebastián Montoya received a five-second penalty for causing a collision. This demoted him from 5th to 11th.

=== Feature race ===
The feature race was held on 1 June 2025, at 10:00 local time (UTC+2).

Pos.	No.	Driver	Entrant	Laps	Time/Retired	Grid	Points
1	4	(United Kingdom) Arvid Lindblad	Campos Racing	37	58:49.191	1	25 (2)
2	9	(Colombia) Sebastián Montoya	Prema Racing	37	+0.301	2	18
3	6	(Netherlands) Richard Verschoor	MP Motorsport	37	+0.602	5	15
4	11	(United States) Jak Crawford	DAMS Lucas Oil	37	+0.927	6	12
5	17	(Republic of Ireland) Alex Dunne	Rodin Motorsport	37	+1.155	8	10 (1)
6	3	(Spain) Pepe Martí	Campos Racing	37	+1.573	11	8
7	12	(India) Kush Maini	DAMS Lucas Oil	37	+2.344	3	6
8	14	(France) Victor Martins	ART Grand Prix	37	+2.605	15	4
9	15	(Japan) Ritomo Miyata	ART Grand Prix	37	+2.884	14	2
10	10	(Italy) Gabriele Minì	Prema Racing	37	+2.988	18	1
11	2	(Czech Republic) Roman Staněk	Invicta Racing	37	+3.629	4	
12	22	(France) Sami Meguetounif	Trident	37	+5.136	19	
13	16	(Belgium) Amaury Cordeel	Rodin Motorsport	37	+5.470	17	
14	23	(United States) Max Esterson	Trident	37	+11.754	16	
15	8	(Sweden) Dino Beganovic	Hitech TGR	37	+11.969	12	
16	5	(Germany) Oliver Goethe	MP Motorsport	37	+13.828^{1}	13	
17	20	(Paraguay) Joshua Dürksen	AIX Racing	37	+14.762^{2}	9	
18	24	(United Kingdom) John Bennett	Van Amersfoort Racing	37	+15.212	21	
19	21	(United Kingdom) Cian Shields	AIX Racing	37	+17.618	20	
20	7	(United Kingdom) Luke Browning	Hitech TGR	37	+48.779^{3}	7	
21	1	(Italy) Leonardo Fornaroli	Invicta Racing	33	Mechanical	10	
DNF	25	(Mexico) Rafael Villagómez	Van Amersfoort Racing	25	Retired	22	
Fastest lap: (Republic of Ireland) Alex Dunne (1:29.179 on lap 27)

Notes:

- ^1 Oliver Goethe received two five-second time penalties for track limits. This demoted him from 12th to 16th.
- ^2 Joshua Dürksen received a five-second time penalty for failing to follow the race director's instructions, and a further five-second time penalty for leaving the track and gaining an advantage. This demoted him from 13th to 17th.
- ^3 Luke Browning received a ten-second time penalty for causing a collision. This did not affect his finishing position.

== Standings after the event ==
Drivers' Championship standings

	Pos.	Driver	Points
1	1	(Republic of Ireland) Alex Dunne	87
2	2	(Netherlands) Richard Verschoor	84
3	3	(United Kingdom) Arvid Lindblad	79
1	4	(United States) Jak Crawford	73
4	5	(United Kingdom) Luke Browning	73

Teams' Championship standings

	Pos.	Team	Points
1	1	(Spain) Campos Racing	128
1	2	(United Kingdom) Hitech TGR	102
2	3	(Netherlands) MP Motorsport	96
	4	(France) DAMS Lucas Oil	94
1	5	(New Zealand) Rodin Motorsport	89

Note: Only the top five positions are included for both sets of standings.

== See also ==
- 2025 Spanish Grand Prix
- 2025 Barcelona Formula 3 round

Previous round: 2025 Monte Carlo Formula 2 round	FIA Formula 2 Championship; 2025 season	Next round: 2025 Spielberg Formula 2 round
Previous round: 2024 Barcelona Formula 2 round	Barcelona Formula 2 round	Next round: 2026 Barcelona Formula 2 round
