= Alex Dunne =

Irish racing driver (born 2005)

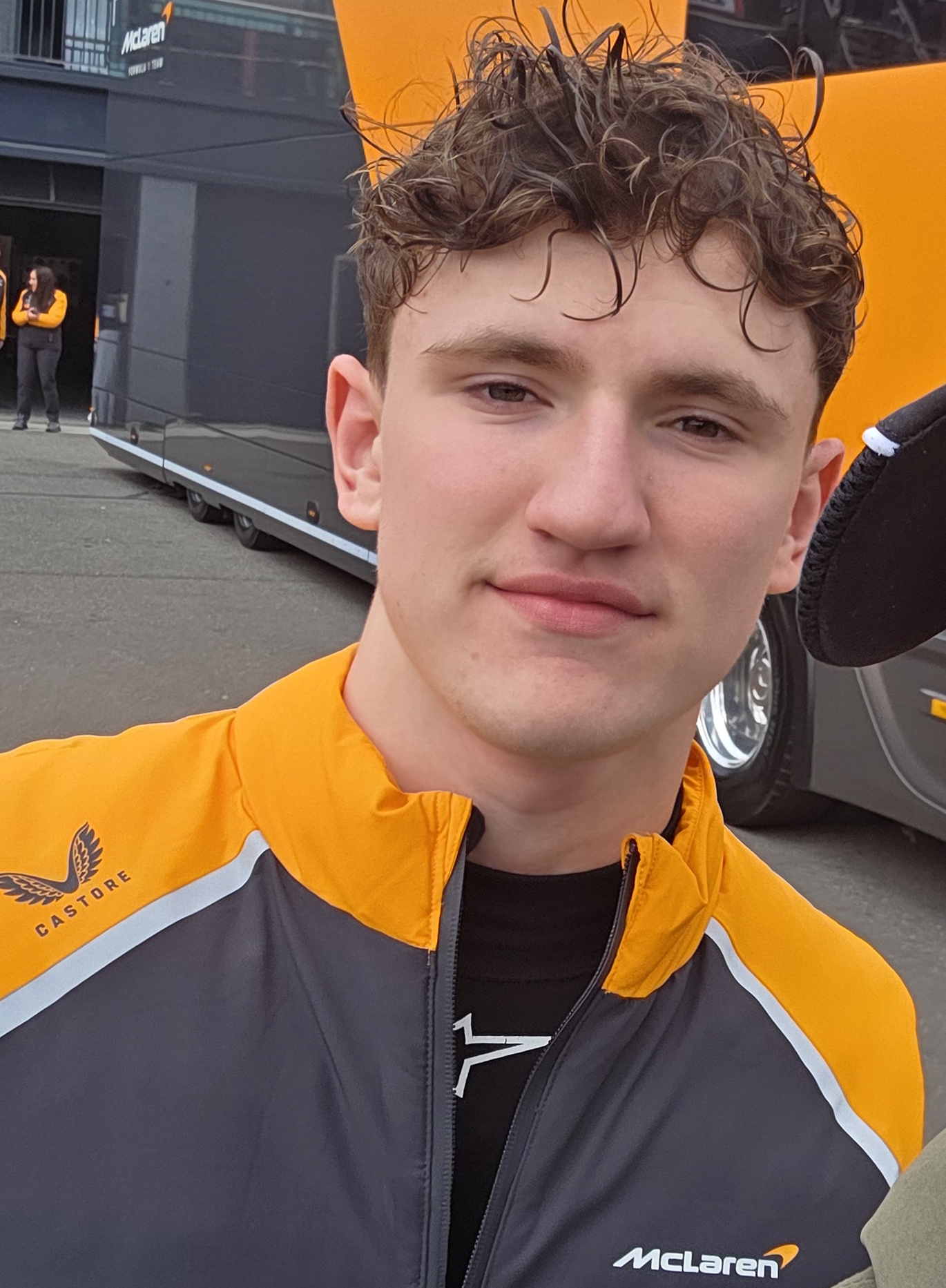
- Dunne in 2025
- Born: Alexander Dunne; 11 November 2005 (age 21); Clonbullogue, Co. Offaly, Ireland
- Nationality: (Republic of Ireland) Irish

FIA Formula 2 Championship career
- Debut season: 2025
- Current team: Rodin Motorsport
- Car number: 15
- Starts: 49
- Wins: 3
- Podiums: 15
- Poles: 3
- Fastest laps: 4
- Best finish: 5th in 2025

Previous series
- 2024; 2023; 2022; 2022; 2022; 2021; 2021: FIA Formula 3; GB3; F4 British; Italian F4; F4 UAE; ADAC F4; F4 Spanish

Championship titles
- 2022: F4 British
- Statistics up to date as of 25 August 2026.

Alexander Dunne (/ˈdʌn/; born 11 November 2005) is an Irish racing driver who competes in the FIA Formula 2 Championship for Rodin Motorsport as part of the Alpine Academy.

Born and raised in County Offaly, Dunne began competitive kart racing aged eight, winning several national titles before progressing to junior formulae in 2021. After debuting in Spanish and ADAC Formula 4, he won the 2022 F4 British Championship with Hitech and finished runner-up to Andrea Kimi Antonelli in Italian F4. He then progressed to GB3 with Hitech, finishing runner-up to Callum Voisin in his rookie season. After a year in FIA Formula 3, Dunne graduated to FIA Formula 2 in 2025 with Rodin, winning multiple races in his rookie campaign.

A McLaren junior from 2024 to 2025, Dunne made his free practice debut in Formula One at the 2025 Austrian Grand Prix with McLaren. He subsequently joined the Alpine Academy for 2026.

== Junior racing career ==
=== Karting ===
Dunne began karting at the age of eight, taking a number of victories in local competitions. He would then progress to national competitions in 2015, winning the Motorsport Ireland 'IRL' and '0' Plates and also taking home the Ironside Trophy. That year, he would also make his first competitive appearance outside of Ireland, racing in the Super 1 National Championship in the United Kingdom. Following two years of competing across Ireland and Great Britain, Dunne started racing in mainland Europe in 2018. He remained in European karting until 2020, with his highlight being winning the WSK Champions Cup in the OK-Junior class in 2019.

=== Formula 4 ===
==== 2021 ====
Dunne made his single-seater racing debut in 2021, racing for Pinnacle Motorsport in the F4 Spanish Championship. His season started out in positive fashion, as he scored a pole position on debut in Spa-Francorchamps. Despite having fallen back to fifth owing to a poor start, finished third in his first ever race. Following the round, Dunne would only score twice in the next two rounds that he competed in. Following the Portimão round, Dunne and the team parted ways, leaving the Irishman 16th in the overall standings with 30 points at the end of the season.

It was announced in September of the same year that Dunne would be joining US Racing as part of their ADAC F4 Championship line-up. At his first round at the Hockenheimring, the Irish driver had an impressive debut, picking up two second places. His next appearance at the track yielded a pair of pole positions, although that round brought a retirement and two fourth places. He finished eighth in the standings with 76 points, beating a number of full-time competitors.

==== 2022 ====
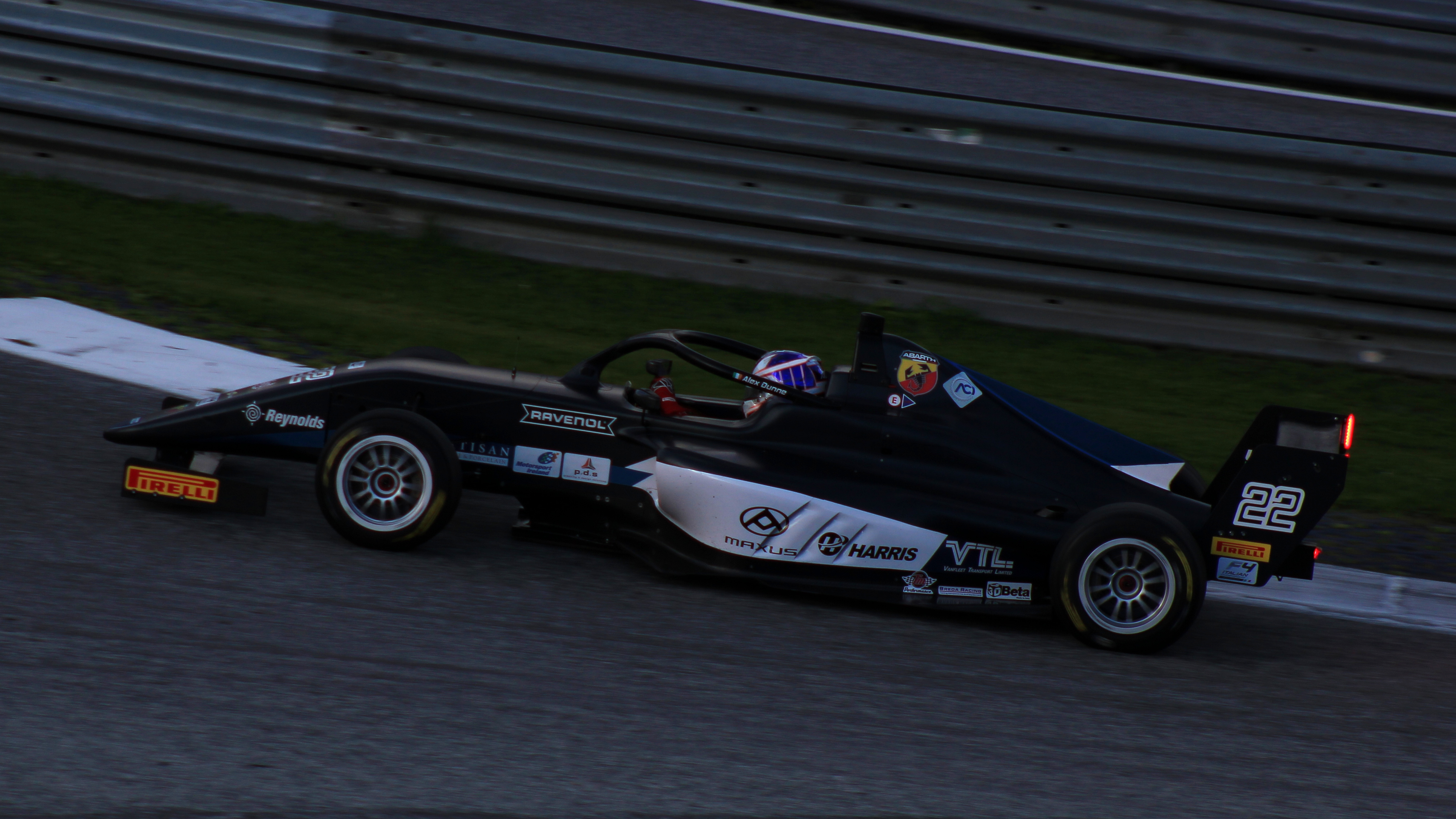
Dunne driving at the Red Bull Ring during the 2022 Italian F4 Championship.

At the beginning of 2022, Dunne competed in the F4 UAE Championship for Hitech GP in preparation for his European campaign. He would achieve his first ever win in car racing during the third at the Dubai Autodrome through unusual circumstances, as, during a red flag, all drivers bar Dunne parked up in the pitlane instead of the start/finish straight, giving them all a five-second penalty. Despite being overtaken by Andrea Kimi Antonelli at the restart, the Irishman remained closely behind the Italian to inherit the victory. After a third place rostrum during the third Dubai round, Dunne won another race during the third race of the final round at the Yas Marina Circuit, he would follow this up with a third place during the last race. Dunne finished sixth in the standings, having scored two wins, four podiums and 168 points.

For his European season, Dunne stayed with US Racing to compete in the Italian F4 Championship, partnering Kacper Sztuka, Marcus Amand, Pedro Perino and Nikhil Bohra. In the first round of the campaign at Imola, Dunne amassed a triple of podiums, having overtaken PHM Racing's Nikita Bedrin in the dying embers of Race 1 to pick up second place and having stormed to the front in Race 2, he held off a fast-charging Rafael Câmara until the checkered flag for the win. Despite losing control of the car in Race 3 after hitting a sausage kerb on lap one, the Irishman was able to recover to third. However, despite a podium at Misano and another one at Spa-Francorchamps, he would be shuffled out of the top two in the championship, being overtaken by Prema drivers Rafael Câmara and Andrea Kimi Antonelli. Dunne returned to winning ways at the Red Bull Ring, taking two victories and an additional podium, thus narrowing the gap to his two competitors. However, despite three second-placed finishes in the remaining two events, Dunne would have to settle for second in the standings, with Antonelli having attained an unassailable lead during the season finale.

During the same year, Dunne also raced in the British F4 series with Hitech. He started his season out in commanding fashion, winning the pair of main races at the season opener at Donington Park, whilst taking second in the reversed-grid race. The following round at Brands Hatch would provide mixed results, as despite a dominant win in Race 1, Dunne ended up finishing out of the points in both other races. Round 3 at the Thruxton Circuit would once again bring success, with the Irishman winning races 1 and 3 and extending his championship lead, having experienced a hard battle with Carlin driver Ugo Ugochukwu on Saturday. Dunne once again won the opening race at the next round held at Oulton Park, but he would only finish third in Race 3, having lost out to Louis Sharp and Oliver Gray at the start. The Irish driver experienced a difficult start to the event in Croft, finishing seventh in Race 1, although Dunne was able to take advantage from a stall by poleman Georgi Dimitrov in Race 2 to take victory. In Sunday's main race, which Dunne started from tenth, he clawed his way back to third place by the checkered flag, with his closest championship rival Gray closing the gap between the pair by winning the race. After a less successful round at Knockhill, Dunne bounced back with a pair of victories in the main races at Snetterton and Thruxton respectively, thus setting a new record for most victories in a single British F4 season. At the penultimate round in Silverstone, Dunne finished on the podium in Race 1 despite being involved in a collision with Gray, and took another third place in the final race of the event. Despite missing the final round, instead having chosen to complete his campaign in Italian F4, Dunne was crowned champion on the final weekend, with his points gap having been insurmountable. Throughout the season, Dunne secured eleven wins, eleven poles, seventeen podiums and 412 points.

At the end of the season, Dunne took part in the F4 UAE Trophy Round with Hitech, finishing second and tenth in the races.

=== Formula Regional ===
At the beginning of 2023, Dunne was set to compete in the for the final two rounds of the Formula Regional Middle East Championship with Hitech Grand Prix, but ultimately didn't partake in any of them.

=== GB3 ===
For the 2023 season, Dunne progressed to the GB3 Championship, returning to Hitech Grand Prix. Dunne began the season with solid points finishes in Oulton Park, and improved his pace in Silverstone with a fourth and sixth place. Dunne tasted success the next round in Spa-Francorchamps, where he clinched his first GB3 victories during Races 1 and 2. However, he only netted one podium in the following three rounds, in which he admitted that he had "difficult title hopes" after the Brands Hatch round. Dunne did bounce back during the penultimate round in Zandvoort where he claimed a double victory, closing the gap to leader Callum Voisin. Dunne notched up a third-place podium and another win in Donington Park, however he ultimately missed out on the title to Voisin by 18 points. Despite that, Dunne still finished runner-up in the standings with 466 points, having taken five wins all season.

=== Macau Grand Prix ===
==== 2023 ====
Dunne joined Hitech Pulse-Eight to make his debut at the 2023 Macau Grand Prix. Dunne impressed on his initial runs coming fifth in Q1, eventually leaving him in sixth for the qualifying race. He had a great start and moved to third early on in the qualification race, before overtaking Gabriele Minì on the safety car restart to finish second. However, misery would pile in the main race as he crashed out on the first lap, misjudging his braking point while trying to overtake Luke Browning for the lead.

==== 2024 ====
Dunne returned to the Macau Grand Prix in 2024, albeit in Formula Regional machinery, with SJM Theodore Prema Racing. He qualified 18th due to an unavoidable crash, but improved in the main race, taking advantage of rivals' mishaps to finish in a respectable sixth place.

=== Formula 3 ===
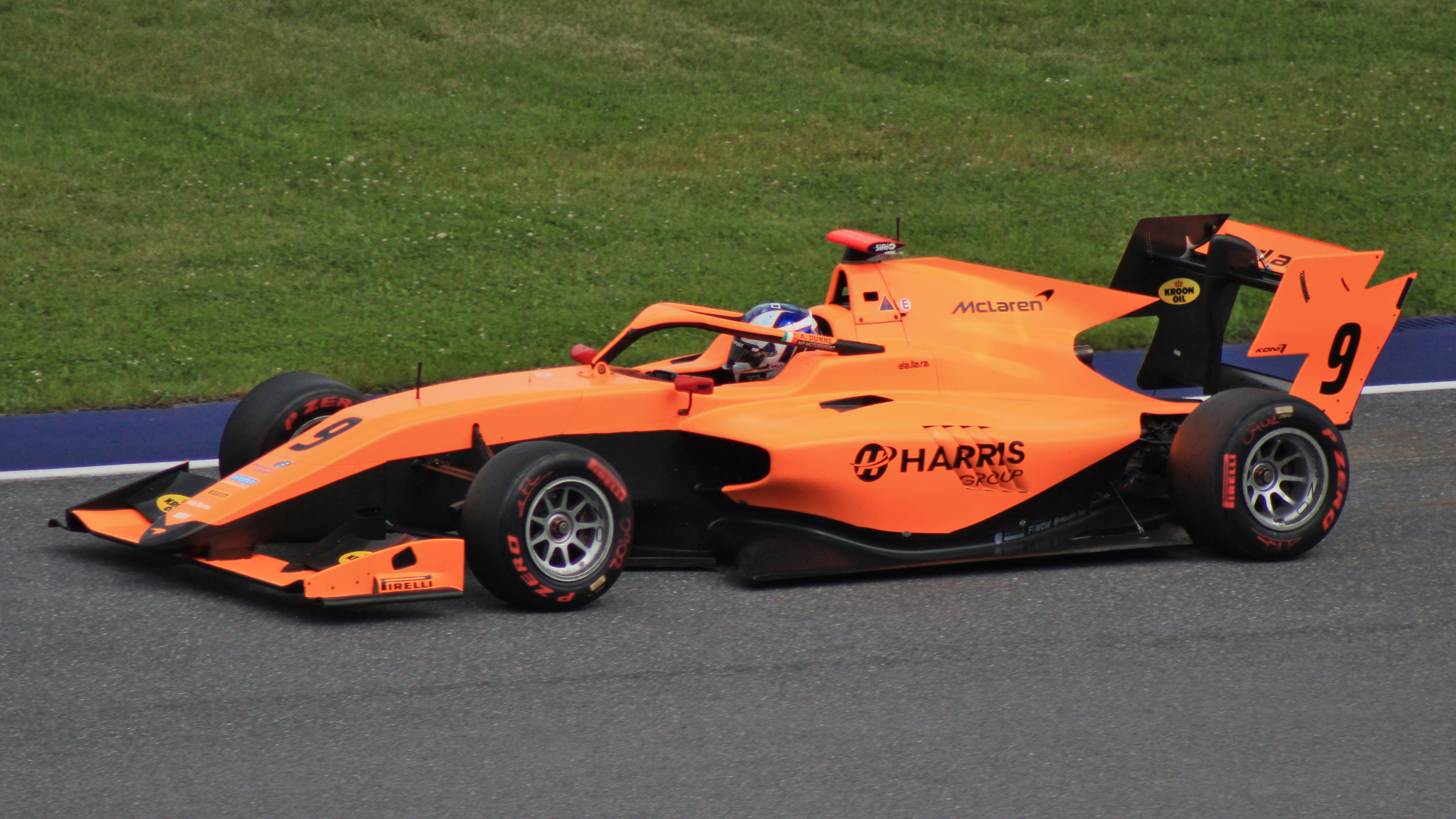
Dunne driving the Dallara F3 2019 during the 2024 Spielberg Formula 3 round

Dunne joined MP Motorsport for the 2024 FIA Formula 3 Championship, completing the team's lineup alongside Red Bull juniors Kacper Sztuka and Tim Tramnitz. He scored points during the Bahrain opener, as Dunne moved up the order from 14th to finish ninth in the feature race. He scored more points in Melbourne with seventh place during the sprint race. In Imola, Dunne was set to qualify fifth; his first top-12 in qualifying but was disqualified due to a non-conformity with the front anti-roll bar links. He recovered a total of thirty places in both races, but did not score points. Another disappointing weekend followed in Monaco followed, where Dunne was eliminated in a multi-car collision during lap 1 of the sprint race. However, his big break came in the Barcelona sprint race, where Dunne secured his first podium in F3 with second place, having fought for the lead with Mari Boya. He had a solid feature race, improving two places to finish in seventh.

In Austria, Dunne had another good weekend, finishing fourth in the sprint despite a slight collision with Sebastián Montoya, and tenth in the feature race. However, Dunne experienced a bruising weekend in Silverstone, as he was involved in a collision with Charlie Wurz during the sprint, while he was an innocent bystander in a collision with Montoya and Joshua Dufek. Dunne also received a ten-place grid drop for Hungary for re-joining onto the track in an unsafe manner. Dunne secured a front row start in Spa-Francorchamps. In the feature race, Dunne dropped two places at the start, and a mistake into the gravel on the safety car restart further lost him places and he fell to tenth at the flag. He qualified on the front row once again for the Monza finale. He had a strong sprint race, carefully overtaking his rivals to finish fourth on the road, but was promoted to the rostrum after a penalty for Montoya. Dunne momentarily led the feature race for the first few laps, but eventually slipped down the order and finished fourth. Dunne finished 14th in the drivers' standings with 50 points, ahead of Sztuka but behind Tramnitz.

=== Formula 2 ===
==== 2025 ====
Dunne took part in the post-season Formula 2 test in Abu Dhabi with Rodin Motorsport.

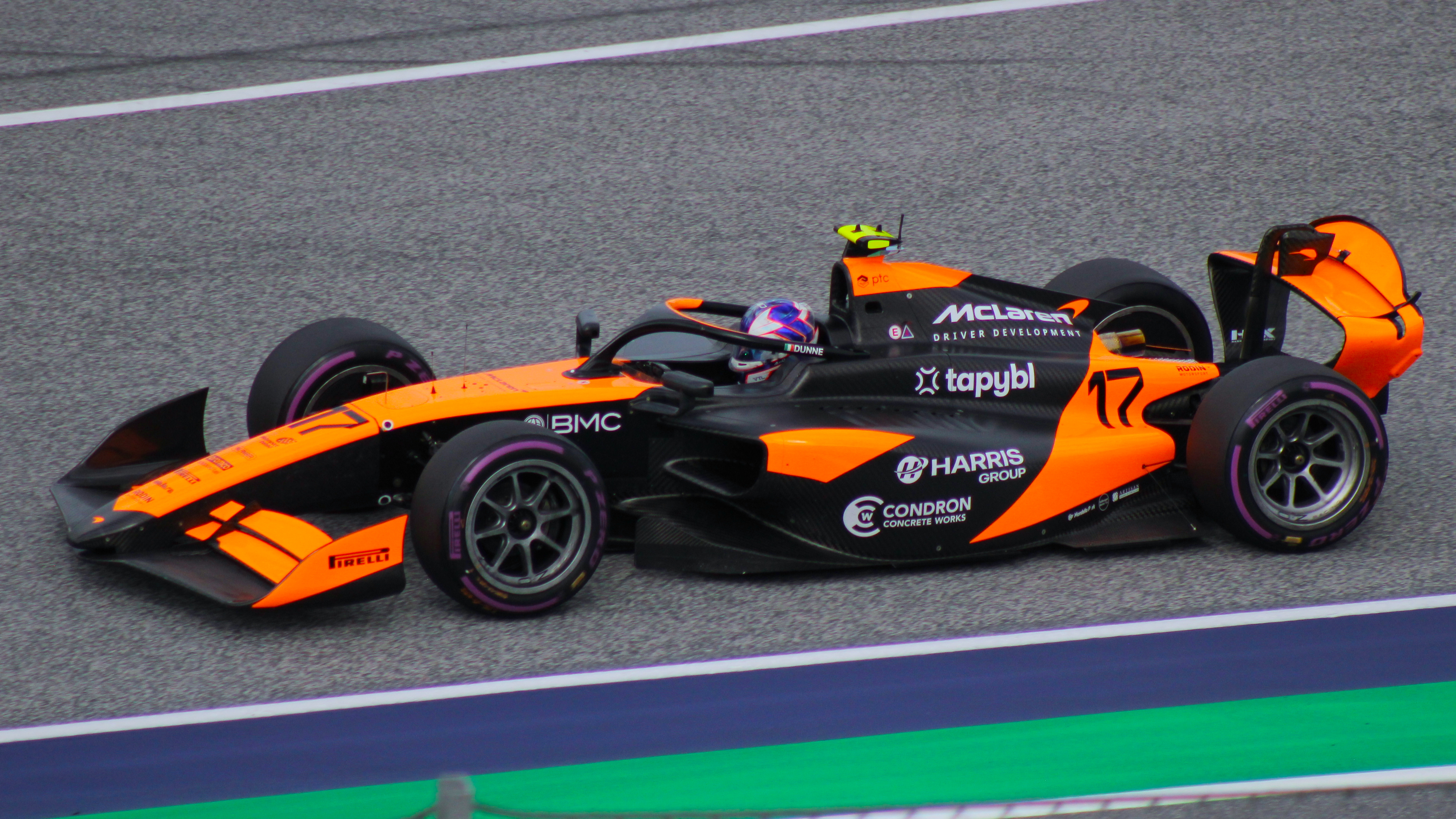
Dunne driving the Dallara F2 2024 during the 2025 Spielberg Formula 2 round

In February 2025, Dunne was confirmed to drive for Rodin Motorsport during the full 2025 Formula 2 season, partnering Amaury Cordeel. His first win of the season came in the Bahrain feature race, where he crossed the line more than eight seconds ahead of Luke Browning after starting from fourth. Two rounds later in Imola, he repeated the feat, this time winning from fifth on the grid. He left Imola in the championship lead, six points ahead of Browning. In Monaco, he took his first pole position in the series by 0.003 seconds over Victor Martins after colliding with Rafael Villagómez at Antony Noghès. In the feature race, he caused an 11-car pileup at Sainte Dévote after Martins overtook him off-the-line, for which he received a ten-place grid penalty. Dunne was disqualified from the Austrian Grand Prix for a breach of the FIA Formula 2 Technical Regulations, specifically excessive front plank wear, with a maximum thickness of 3.37mm and 3.27mm at the periphery of two of the designated holes, an error by Rodin. He then finished second at Silverstone. He then took pole position at Spa Francorchamps and went on to win the feature race, but was handed a post-race ten-second penalty for failing to engage the start set-up procedure behind the safety car. Dunne would score three more podium finishes to end the season in fifth place in the drivers' standings.

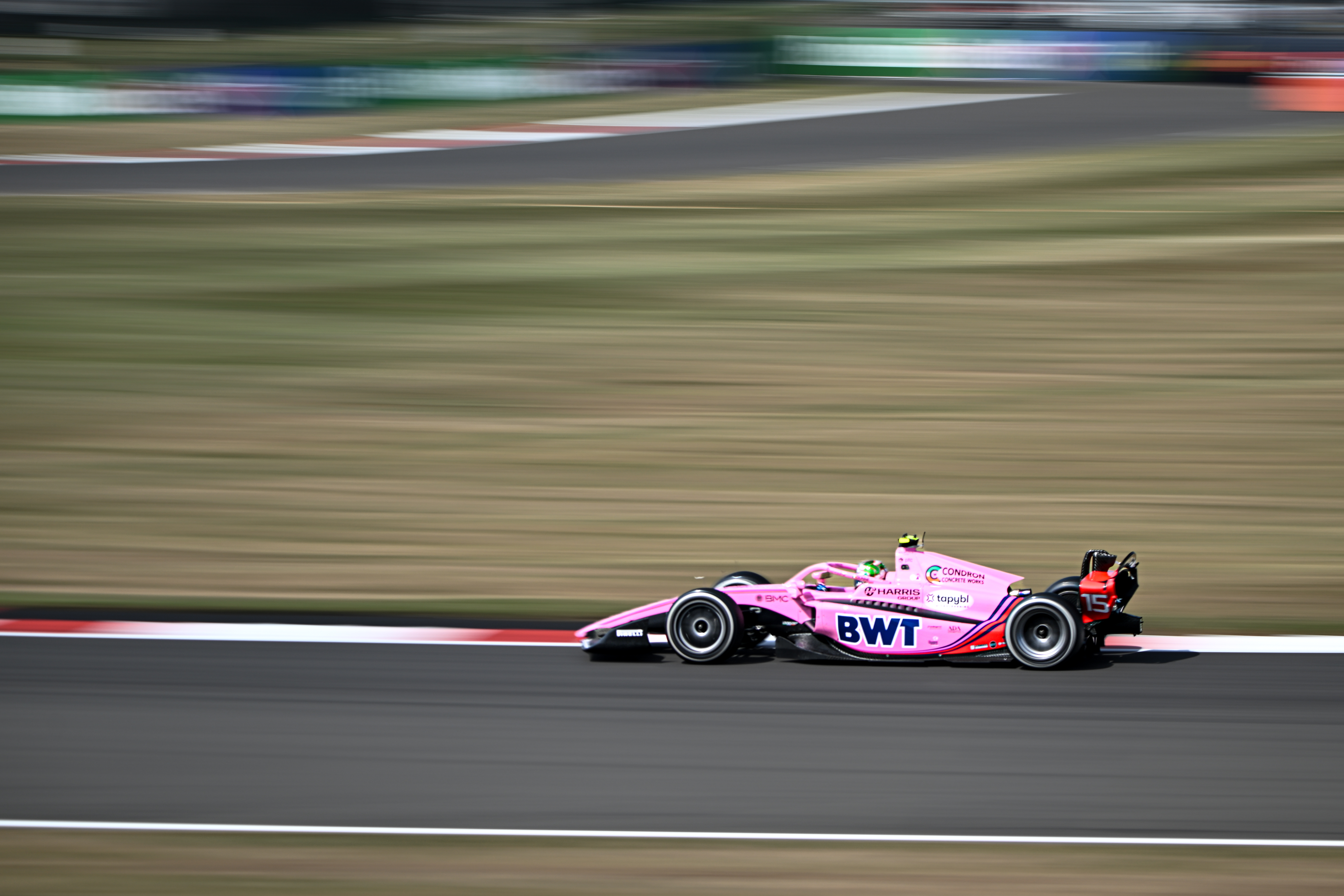
Dunne driving for Rodin Motorsport during the 2026 British Grand Prix weekend at Silverstone

==== 2026 ====
In December 2025, it was announced that Dunne had re-signed with Rodin Motorsport to compete in the 2026 season, partnering Martinius Stenshorne.

=== Formula E ===
In January 2025, Dunne was announced as the reserve and development driver for McLaren Formula E Team. He made his debut in Formula E machinery during the rookie practice session for the Jeddah ePrix.

Dunne took part in the Berlin rookie test at the Tempelhof Airport Street Circuit in July later that year alongside fellow McLaren development driver Ella Lloyd.

== Formula One ==
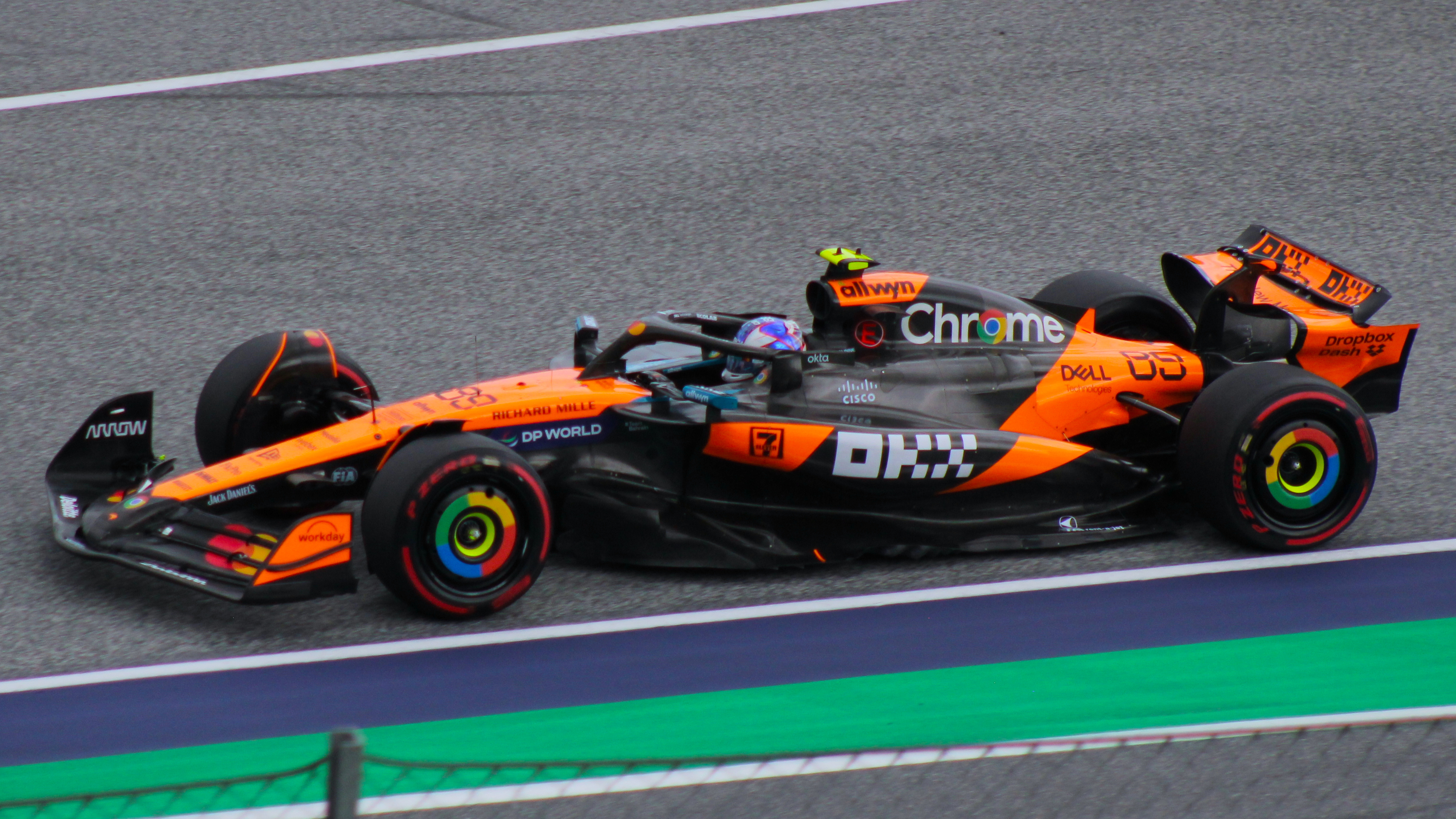
Dunne joined the McLaren Driver Development Programme in 2024, debuting in free practice at the 2025 Austrian Grand Prix.

In September 2022, Dunne took part in a scouting camp conducted by the Ferrari Driver Academy. Ahead of the 2024 Imola Formula 3 round in May, Dunne was announced to be joining the McLaren Driver Development Programme.

In May 2025, Dunne conducted his first test run in a McLaren Formula 1 car, driving the McLaren MCL60 at Circuit Zandvoort. He later drove the car once again a month later at the Circuit of the Americas.

In June 2025, during the Austrian Grand Prix, Dunne took part in his first practice session for the team, driving Lando Norris's McLaren MCL39, where he set the fourth-fastest lap, 0.224 seconds off the leading time. He took part in his second practice session, and his last for McLaren, in place of Oscar Piastri during the Italian Grand Prix.

Prior to the 2025 Singapore Grand Prix, McLaren announced Dunne had been released from the programme.

In February 2026, Dunne joined the Alpine Formula One team's Driver Academy. This was officially confirmed on 4 March 2026, ahead of the season opener in Melbourne, Australia.

== Other racing ==
=== IndyCar ===
In October 2026, Dunne completed his first IndyCar test at the Barber Motorsports Park, amidst speculation of a move to America.

== Personal life ==
Dunne is the son of Noel Dunne, a former racing driver who won the Irish Formula Ford F1600 series on two occasions.

== Karting record ==
=== Karting career summary ===
Season	Series	Team	Position
2015	Motorsport Ireland 'IRL' Plate		**1st**
2015	Motorsport Ireland '0' Plate		**1st**
2015	T. Rogers Memorial Cup		**1st**
2015	Ironside Trophy		**1st**
2015	Super 1 National Championships — IAME Cadet		42nd
2016	LGM Series — IAME Cadet		20th
2016	Motorsport Ireland '0' Plate		**1st**
2017	LGM Series — IAME Cadet		**2nd**
2017	ROK Cup International Final — Mini ROK		5th
2017	Super 1 National Championships — IAME Cadet		4th
2017	Kartmasters British Grand Prix — IAME Cadet	Primo Racing	**3rd**
2018	WSK Champions Cup — OK-J	Forza Racing	NC
2018	WSK Super Master Series — OK-J	Forza Racing	15th
2018	WSK Open Cup — OK-J	Forza Racing	26th
2018	CIK-FIA European Championship — OK-J	Forza Racing	37th
2018	CIK-FIA World Championship — OK-J	Forza Racing	11th
2018	IAME International Final — X30 Junior	Forza Racing	11th
2018	WSK Final Cup — OK-J	Forza Racing	29th
2019	WSK Champions Cup — OK-J	Forza Racing	**1st**
2019	South Garda Winter Cup — OK-J	Forza Racing	31st
2019	WSK Super Master Series — OK-J	Forza Racing	40th
2019	Coupe de France — OK-J		22nd
2019	Italian Championship — OK-J		10th
2019	CIK-FIA European Championship — OK-J	Tony Kart Racing Team	7th
2019	WSK Euro Series — OK-J	Tony Kart Racing Team	11th
2019	CIK-FIA World Championship — OK-J	Tony Kart Racing Team	NC
2020	WSK Euro Series — OK	DR	57th
2020	CIK-FIA European Championship — OK	Birel ART Racing	25th
2020	Champions of the Future — OK	Birel ART Racing	21st
2020	CIK-FIA World Championship — OK	Energy Corse	26th
2020	WSK Open Cup — OK	Energy Corse	17th

=== Complete CIK-FIA Karting European Championship results ===
(key) (Races in bold indicate pole position) (Races in italics indicate fastest lap)

Year	Team	Class	1	2	3	4	5	6	7	8	DC	Points
2018	Forza Racing	OK-J	SAR; QH; 40	SAR; R DNQ	PFI; QH; 18	PFI; R 24	AMP; QH; 23	AMP; R 19	LEM; QH; 9	LEM; R 28	37th	2
2019	Tony Kart Racing Team	OK-J	ANG; QH; 12	ANG; R 7	GEN; QH; 2	GEN; R 2	KRI; QH; 12	KRI; R 11	LEM; QH; 12	LEM; R 29	7th	43
2020	Birel ART Racing	OK	ZUE; QH; 8	ZUE; R 33	SAR; QH; 12	SAR; R 22	WAC; QH	WAC; R			25th	3

== Racing record ==
=== Racing career summary ===
Season	Series	Team	Races	Wins	Poles	F/Laps	Podiums	Points	Position
2021	F4 Spanish Championship	Pinnacle Motorsport	9	0	1	0	1	30	16th
2021	ADAC Formula 4 Championship	US Racing	8	0	2	3	2	76	8th
2022	F4 British Championship	Hitech Grand Prix	27	11	11	11	17	412	**1st**
2022	Formula 4 UAE Championship	Hitech Grand Prix	20	2	0	1	4	168	6th
2022	Italian F4 Championship	US Racing	20	3	1	3	11	258	**2nd**
2023	Formula 4 UAE Championship – Trophy Round	Hitech Grand Prix	2	0	1	0	1	—N/a	NC
2023	GB3 Championship	Hitech Grand Prix	23	5	1	8	7	466	**2nd**
2023	Macau Grand Prix	Hitech Pulse-Eight	1	0	0	0	0	—N/a	DNF
2024	FIA Formula 3 Championship	MP Motorsport	20	0	0	0	2	50	14th
2024	Macau Grand Prix	SJM Theodore Prema Racing	1	0	0	0	0	—N/a	6th
2024–25	Formula E	NEOM McLaren Formula E Team	Reserve driver						
2025	FIA Formula 2 Championship	Rodin Motorsport	27	2	2	2	8	150	5th
2025	Formula One	McLaren F1 Team	Test driver						
2026	FIA Formula 2 Championship	Rodin Motorsport	25	1	0	1	9	189	3rd*

* Season still in progress.

=== Complete F4 Spanish Championship results ===
(key) (Races in bold indicate pole position) (Races in italics indicate fastest lap)

Year	Team	1	2	3	4	5	6	7	8	9	10	11	12	13	14	15	16	17	18	19	20	21	Pos	Points
2021	Pinnacle Motorsport	**SPA**; **1**; 3	SPA; 2; 5	SPA; 3; 25	NAV; 1; 14	NAV; 2; 14	NAV; 3; 7	ALG; 1; 10	ALG; 2; 15	ALG; 3 Ret	ARA; 1	ARA; 2	ARA; 3	CRT; 1	CRT; 2	CRT; 3	JER; 1	JER; 2	JER; 3	CAT; 1	CAT; 2	CAT; 3	16th	30

=== Complete ADAC Formula 4 Championship results ===
(key) (Races in bold indicate pole position) (Races in italics indicate fastest lap)

Year	Team	1	2	3	4	5	6	7	8	9	10	11	12	13	14	15	16	17	18	Pos	Points
2021	US Racing	RBR; 1	RBR; 2	RBR; 3	ZAN; 1	ZAN; 2	ZAN; 3	HOC1; 1; 2	HOC1; 2; 2	HOC1; 3 DNS	SAC; 1	SAC; 2	SAC; 3	**HOC2**; **1** Ret	**HOC2**; **2**; 4	HOC2; 3; 4	NÜR; 1; 4	NÜR; 2; 15†	NÜR; 3; 8	8th	76

=== Complete Formula 4 UAE Championship results ===
(key) (Races in bold indicate pole position) (Races in italics indicate fastest lap)

Year	Team	1	2	3	4	5	6	7	8	9	10	11	12	13	14	15	16	17	18	19	20	Pos	Points
2022	Hitech Grand Prix	YMC1; 1; 4	YMC1; 2; 9	YMC1; 3; 23	YMC1; 4; 10	DUB1; 1; 9	DUB1; 2; 6	DUB1; 3; 6	DUB1; 4; 21	DUB2; 1; 8	DUB2; 2; 8	DUB2; 3; 8	DUB2; 4; 1	DUB3; 1; 4	DUB3; 2; 3	DUB3; 3; 7	DUB3; 4; 9	YMC2; 1; 4	YMC2; 2; 5	YMC2; 3; 1	YMC2; 4; 3	6th	168

=== Complete F4 British Championship results ===
(key) (Races in bold indicate pole position) (Races in italics indicate fastest lap)

Year	Team	1	2	3	4	5	6	7	8	9	10	11	12	13	14	15	16	17	18	19	20	21	22	23	24	25	26	27	28	29	30	DC	Points
2022	Hitech Grand Prix	DON; 1; 1	DON; 2; 2^{7}	**DON**; **3**; 1	**BHI**; **1**; 1	BHI; 2; 14	**BHI**; **3**; 14	**THR1**; **1**; 1	THR1; 2; 5^{5}	**THR1**; **3**; 1	**OUL**; **1**; 1	OUL; 2; 9^{1}	**OUL**; **3**; 3	CRO; 1; 7	CRO; 2; 1^{1}	CRO; 3; 3	KNO; 1; 2	KNO; 2; 4	KNO; 3; 14	**SNE**; **1**; 1	SNE; 2; 6^{4}	**SNE**; **3**; 1	**THR2**; **1**; 1	THR2; 2; 10	**THR2**; **3**; 1	SIL; 1; 3	SIL; 2; 11	SIL; 3; 3	BHGP; 1	BHGP; 2	BHGP; 3	1st	412

=== Complete Italian F4 Championship results ===
(key) (Races in bold indicate pole position) (Races in italics indicate fastest lap)

Year	Team	1	2	3	4	5	6	7	8	9	10	11	12	13	14	15	16	17	18	19	20	21	22	DC	Points
2022	US Racing	IMO; 1; 2	IMO; 2; 1	IMO; 3; 3	MIS; 1; 3	MIS; 2; 33†	MIS; 3; 7	SPA; 1; 10	SPA; 2; 2	SPA; 3; 5	VLL; 1; 4	VLL; 2; 4	VLL; 3 Ret	RBR; 1; 1	RBR; 2; 3	RBR; 3	**RBR**; **4**; 1	MNZ; 1; 2	MNZ; 2; 6	MNZ; 3 C	MUG; 1; 2	MUG; 2; 2	MUG; 3 Ret	2nd	258

=== Complete GB3 Championship results ===
(key) (Races in bold indicate pole position) (Races in italics indicate fastest lap)

Year	Team	1	2	3	4	5	6	7	8	9	10	11	12	13	14	15	16	17	18	19	20	21	22	23	24	DC	Points
2023	Hitech Grand Prix	OUL; 1; 6	OUL; 2; 13	OUL; 3; 10^{9}	SIL1; 1; 4	SIL1; 2 Ret	SIL1; 3; 6^{12}	SPA; 1; 1	SPA; 2; 1	SPA; 3; 6^{18}	SNE; 1; 4	SNE; 2; 2	SNE; 3; 12^{9}	SIL2; 1; 5	SIL2; 2; 6	SIL2; 3 C	BRH; 1 Ret	BRH; 2; 4	BRH; 3; 11^{8}	**ZAN**; **1**; 1	ZAN; 2; 1	ZAN; 3; 16^{8}	DON; 1; 3	DON; 2; 1	DON; 3; 9^{11}	2nd	466

=== Complete Macau Grand Prix results ===
Year	Team	Car	Qualifying	Quali Race	Main race
2023	(United Kingdom) Hitech Pulse-Eight	Dallara F3 2019	6th	**2nd**	DNF
2024	(Hong Kong) SJM Theodore Prema Racing	Tatuus F3 T-318	18th	12th	6th

=== Complete FIA Formula 3 Championship results ===
(key) (Races in bold indicate pole position) (Races in italics indicate fastest lap)

Year	Entrant	1	2	3	4	5	6	7	8	9	10	11	12	13	14	15	16	17	18	19	20	DC	Points
2024	MP Motorsport	BHR; SPR; 12	BHR; FEA; 9	MEL; SPR; 7	MEL; FEA; 16	IMO; SPR; 14	IMO; FEA; 16	MON; SPR; Ret	MON; FEA; 16	CAT; SPR; 2	CAT; FEA; 7	RBR; SPR; 4	RBR; FEA; 10	SIL; SPR; 22	SIL; FEA; Ret	HUN; SPR; 20	HUN; FEA; 16	SPA; SPR; 23	SPA; FEA; 10	MNZ; SPR; 3	MNZ; FEA; 4	14th	50

=== Complete FIA Formula 2 Championship results ===
(key) (Races in bold indicate pole position; races in italics indicate points for the fastest lap of the top-10 finishers)

Year	Entrant	1	2	3	4	5	6	7	8	9	10	11	12	13	14	15	16	17	18	19	20	21	22	23	24	25	26	27	28	29	Pos	Points
2025	Rodin Motorsport	MEL; SPR; 9	MEL; FEA; C	BHR; SPR; 19	BHR; FEA; 1	JED; SPR; 3	JED; FEA; 8	IMO; SPR; 5	IMO; FEA; 1	MON; SPR; 9	**MON**; **FEA**; Ret	CAT; SPR; 2	CAT; FEA; 5	RBR; SPR; 6	RBR; FEA; DSQ	SIL; SPR; Ret	SIL; FEA; 2	SPA; SPR; 7	**SPA**; **FEA**; 9	HUN; SPR; 2	HUN; FEA; 9	MNZ; SPR; 13	MNZ; FEA; Ret	BAK; SPR; 3	BAK; FEA; Ret	LSL; SPR; 5	LSL; FEA; 3	YMC; SPR; 8	YMC; FEA; Ret		5th	150
2026	Rodin Motorsport	MEL; SPR; 3	MEL; FEA; Ret	MIA; SPR; 3	MIA; FEA; Ret	MTL; SPR; 13	MTL; FEA; 2	MON; SPR; 9	MON; FEA; 2	CAT; SPR; 8	CAT; FEA; 2	RBR; SPR; 4	RBR; FEA; 6	SIL; SPR; 9	SIL; FEA; 4	SPA; SPR; 5	SPA; FEA; 4	HUN; SPR; 19	HUN; FEA; 11	MNZ; SPR; 7	MNZ; FEA; 6	MAD; SPR; 7	MAD; FEA; 2	BAK; SPR; 3	**BAK**; **FEA1**; 1	BAK; FEA2; 3	LSL; SPR	LSL; FEA	YMC; SPR	YMC; FEA	3rd*	189*

* Season still in progress.

=== Complete Formula One participations ===
(key) (Races in bold indicate pole position; races in italics indicate fastest lap; ^{superscript} indicates point-scoring sprint position)

Year	Entrant	Chassis	Engine	1	2	3	4	5	6	7	8	9	10	11	12	13	14	15	16	17	18	19	20	21	22	23	24	WDC	Points
2025	McLaren F1 Team	McLaren MCL39	Mercedes-AMG M16 E Performance 1.6 V6 t	AUS	CHN	JPN	BHR	SAU	MIA	EMI	MON	ESP	CAN	AUT; TD	GBR	BEL	HUN	NED	ITA; TD	AZE	SIN	USA	MXC	SAP	LVG	QAT	ABU	–	–

Sporting positions
Preceded by Matthew Rees	F4 British Championship; Champion; 2022	Succeeded by Louis Sharp
