= 2026 Spielberg Formula 2 round =

Motor racing event

(Austria) 2026 Spielberg Formula 2 round
Round details
- Round 6 of 14 in the 2026 FIA Formula 2 Championship.
- Location: Red Bull Ring; Spielberg, Austria
- Course: Permanent racing facility 4.326 km (2.688 mi)

Sprint Race
- Date: 27 June 2026
- Laps: 28
Podium
First	(United Kingdom) John Bennett	Trident
Second	(Colombia) Sebastián Montoya	Prema Racing
Third	(Mexico) Rafael Villagómez	Van Amersfoort Racing
Fastest lap
Driver	(Brazil) Rafael Câmara	Invicta Racing
- Time: 1:18.962 (on lap 7)

Feature Race
- Date: 28 June 2026
- Laps: 40
Pole position
Driver	(Mexico) Noel León	Campos Racing
Time	1:15.544	
Podium
First	(Bulgaria) Nikola Tsolov	Campos Racing
Second	(Italy) Gabriele Minì	MP Motorsport
Third	(Germany) Oliver Goethe	MP Motorsport
Fastest lap
Driver	(Germany) Oliver Goethe	MP Motorsport
- Time: 1:18.384 (on lap 31)

The 2026 Spielberg FIA Formula 2 round was a motor racing event held between 26 and 28 June 2026 at the Red Bull Ring. It was the sixth round of the 2026 FIA Formula 2 Championship and was held in support of the 2026 Austrian Grand Prix.

== Classification ==
=== Qualifying ===
Qualifying was held on 26 June 2026 at 15:55 local time (UTC+2).

Pos.	No.	Driver	Entrant	Time/Gap	Grid SR	Grid FR
1	5	(Mexico) Noel León	Campos Racing	1:15.544	10	1
2	15	(Republic of Ireland) Alex Dunne	Rodin Motorsport	+0.129	9	2
3	6	(Bulgaria) Nikola Tsolov	Campos Racing	+0.186	8	3
4	9	(Italy) Gabriele Minì	MP Motorsport	+0.225	7	4
5	1	(Brazil) Rafael Câmara	Invicta Racing	+0.240	6	5
6	17	(Thailand) Tasanapol Inthraphuvasak	ART Grand Prix	+0.255	5	6
7	10	(Germany) Oliver Goethe	MP Motorsport	+0.313	4	7
8	23	(Mexico) Rafael Villagómez	Van Amersfoort Racing	+0.319	3	8
9	25	(United Kingdom) John Bennett	Trident	+0.352	2	9
10	11	(Colombia) Sebastián Montoya	Prema Racing	+0.411	1	10
11	2	(Paraguay) Joshua Dürksen	Invicta Racing	+0.425	11	11
12	16	(India) Kush Maini	ART Grand Prix	+0.519	12	12
13	8	(Poland) Roman Bilinski	DAMS Lucas Oil	+0.582	13	13
14	7	(Sweden) Dino Beganovic	DAMS Lucas Oil	+0.653	14	14
15	12	(Spain) Mari Boya	Prema Racing	+0.717	15	15
16	24	(Netherlands) Laurens van Hoepen	Trident	+0.725	16	16
17	3	(Japan) Ritomo Miyata	Hitech	+0.733	17	17
18	20	(Brazil) Emerson Fittipaldi Jr.	AIX Racing	+0.869	18	18
19	21	(United Kingdom) Cian Shields	AIX Racing	+1.027	19	19
20	4	(United States) Colton Herta	Hitech	+1.036	20	20
21	14	(Norway) Martinius Stenshorne	Rodin Motorsport	+1.064	21	21
22	22	(Argentina) Nico Varrone	Van Amersfoort Racing	+1.218	22	22

=== Sprint race ===
The sprint race was held on 27 June 2026 at 14:15 local time (UTC+2).

Pos.	No.	Driver	Entrant	Laps	Time/Retired	Grid	Points
1	25	(United Kingdom) John Bennett	Trident	28	39:23.246	2	10
2	11	(Colombia) Sebastián Montoya	Prema Racing	28	+1.496	1	8
3	23	(Mexico) Rafael Villagómez	Van Amersfoort Racing	28	+1.634	3	6
4	15	(Republic of Ireland) Alex Dunne	Rodin Motorsport	28	+2.388	9	5
5	9	(Italy) Gabriele Minì	MP Motorsport	28	+2.579	7	4
6	8	(Poland) Roman Bilinski	DAMS Lucas Oil	28	+5.233	13	3
7	16	(India) Kush Maini	ART Grand Prix	28	+6.098	12	2
8	6	(Bulgaria) Nikola Tsolov	Campos Racing	28	+8.450	8	1
9	1	(Brazil) Rafael Câmara	Invicta Racing	28	+9.908^{1}	6	0+1
10	5	(Mexico) Noel León	Campos Racing	28	+12.830	10	
11	12	(Spain) Mari Boya	Prema Racing	28	+13.050	15	
12	22	(Argentina) Nico Varrone	Van Amersfoort Racing	28	+15.941	22	
13	7	(Sweden) Dino Beganovic	DAMS Lucas Oil	28	+17.324	14	
14	14	(Norway) Martinius Stenshorne	Rodin Motorsport	28	+18.028	21	
15	24	(Netherlands) Laurens van Hoepen	Trident	28	+25.027	16	
16	21	(United Kingdom) Cian Shields	AIX Racing	28	+25.611	19	
17	3	(Japan) Ritomo Miyata	Hitech	28	+31.287^{2}	17	
DNF	4	(United States) Colton Herta	Hitech	19		20	
DNF	2	(Paraguay) Joshua Dürksen	Invicta Racing	11	Collision damage	11	
DNF	10	(Germany) Oliver Goethe	MP Motorsport	0	Collision	4	
DNF	17	(Thailand) Tasanapol Inthraphuvasak	ART Grand Prix	0	Collision	5	
DNF	20	(Brazil) Emerson Fittipaldi Jr.	AIX Racing	0	Collision	18	
Fastest lap: (Brazil) Rafael Câmara (1:18.962 on lap 7)

Notes:

- ^1 – Rafael Câmara received a five-second time penalty for causing a collision with Tasanapol Inthraphuvasak. The penalty dropped Câmara from 6th to 9th in the final classification.
- ^2 – Ritomo Miyata received a five-second time penalty for exceeding the minimum delta time during a Virtual Safety Car.

=== Feature race ===
The feature race was held on 28 June 2026 at 10:10 local time (UTC+2).

Pos.	No.	Driver	Entrant	Laps	Time/Retired	Grid	Points
1	6	(Bulgaria) Nikola Tsolov	Campos Racing	40	56:10.538	3	25
2	9	(Italy) Gabriele Minì	MP Motorsport	40	+3.993	4	18
3	10	(Germany) Oliver Goethe	MP Motorsport	40	+12.198	7	15+1
4	1	(Brazil) Rafael Câmara	Invicta Racing	40	+14.903	5	12
5	17	(Thailand) Tasanapol Inthraphuvasak	ART Grand Prix	40	+15.514	6	10
6	15	(Republic of Ireland) Alex Dunne	Rodin Motorsport	40	+20.710	2	8
7	5	(Mexico) Noel León	Campos Racing	40	+21.367	1	6
8	24	(Netherlands) Laurens van Hoepen	Trident	40	+21.801	16	4
9	2	(Paraguay) Joshua Dürksen	Invicta Racing	40	+22.449	11	2
10	8	(Poland) Roman Bilinski	DAMS Lucas Oil	40	+22.772	13	1
11	25	(United Kingdom) John Bennett	Trident	40	+26.781	9	
12	16	(India) Kush Maini	ART Grand Prix	40	+28.330	12	
13	7	(Sweden) Dino Beganovic	DAMS Lucas Oil	40	+31.266	14	
14	20	(Brazil) Emerson Fittipaldi Jr.	AIX Racing	40	+31.300	18	
15	3	(Japan) Ritomo Miyata	Hitech	40	+32.990	17	
16	22	(Argentina) Nico Varrone	Van Amersfoort Racing	40	+33.059	22	
17	21	(United Kingdom) Cian Shields	AIX Racing	40	+34.626	19	
18	4	(United States) Colton Herta	Hitech	40	+35.623	20	
19	14	(Norway) Martinius Stenshorne	Rodin Motorsport	40	+49.667^{1}	21	
DNF	12	(Spain) Mari Boya	Prema Racing	25	Mechanical issue	15	
DNF	23	(Mexico) Rafael Villagómez	Van Amersfoort Racing	0	Collision	8	
DNF	11	(Colombia) Sebastián Montoya	Prema Racing	0	Collision	10	
Fastest lap: (Germany) Oliver Goethe (1:18.384 on lap 31)

Notes:

- ^1 – Martinius Stenshorne received a 30-second time penalty for failing to serve a mandatory pitstop. This dropped him from 6th to 19th in the final classification.

== Standings after the event ==
Drivers' Championship standings

Pos.	Driver	Points
1	(Italy) Gabriele Minì	108
2	(Bulgaria) Nikola Tsolov	106
3	(Brazil) Rafael Câmara	82
4	(Republic of Ireland) Alex Dunne	80
5	(Mexico) Noel León	62

Teams' Championship standings

	Pos.	Team	Points
	1	(Spain) Campos Racing	168
1	2	(Netherlands) MP Motorsport	136
1	3	(New Zealand) Rodin Motorsport	128
	4	(United Kingdom) Invicta Racing	105
	5	(France) DAMS Lucas Oil	69

Note: Only the top five positions are included for both sets of standings.

== See also ==
- 2026 Austrian Grand Prix
- 2026 Spielberg Formula 3 round

Previous round: 2026 Barcelona Formula 2 round	FIA Formula 2 Championship; 2026 season	Next round: 2026 Silverstone Formula 2 round
Previous round: 2025 Spielberg Formula 2 round	Spielberg Formula 2 round	Next round: 2027 Spielberg Formula 2 round
