= James Wharton (racing driver) =

Australian racing driver (born 2006)

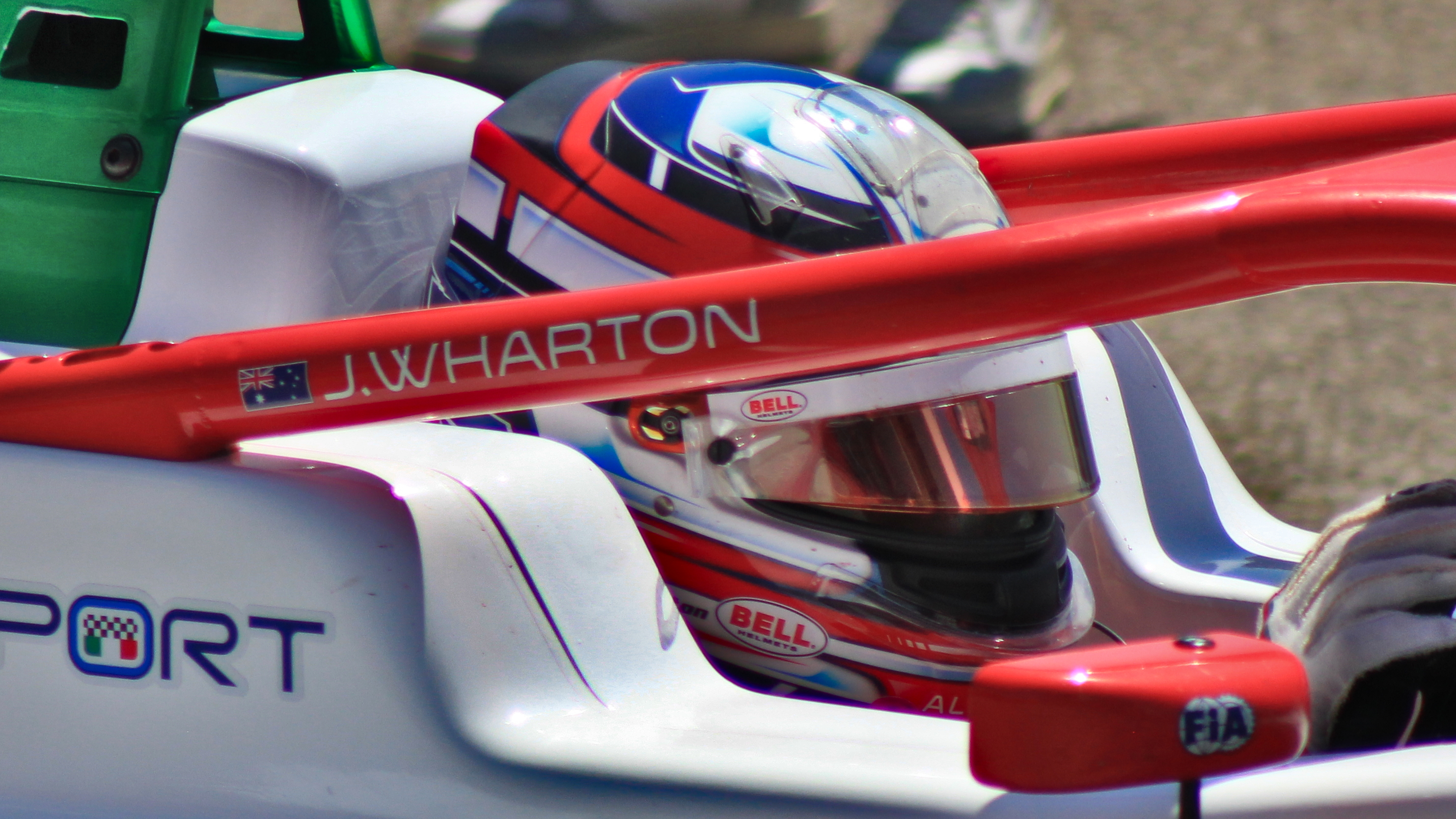
- Wharton in 2024
- Nationality: (Australia) Australian
- Born: James Anthony Wharton; 8 July 2006 (age 20) Bundoora, Victoria, Australia

FIA Formula 3 Championship career
- Debut season: 2024
- Categorisation: FIA Silver
- Car number: 21
- Former teams: Hitech TGR, ART Grand Prix, Prema Racing
- Starts: 39
- Wins: 2
- Podiums: 3
- Poles: 0
- Fastest laps: 3
- Best finish: 17th in 2026

Previous series
- 2025; 2024–2026; 2024; 2024 2024; 2023; 2022–2023; 2022; 2022–2023: FIA Formula 2; FIA Formula 3; FR European; GB3; FR Middle East; Euro 4; Italian F4; ADAC Formula 4; F4 UAE

Championship titles
- 2023: Formula 4 UAE Championship
- Statistics up to date as of 23 September 2026.

James Anthony Wharton (born 8 July 2006) is an Australian racing driver who is set to compete in the FIA Formula 2 Championship with Trident.

Wharton was the runner-up in the 2024 Formula Regional European Championship, and was the 2023 Formula 4 UAE champion. He was a race winner in Italian F4 and FIA Formula 3. He was a member of the Ferrari Driver Academy between 2021 and 2023.

== Career ==
=== Karting ===
Wharton began karting at the age of eight in his homeland of Australia. Following two years in Mini and Cadet karting, he won eight out of ten races in his 2017 season, winning the Australian Championship in the process. Following that, he and his father moved to Europe to progress his career, where he spent four years contracted to Parolin, competing in various continental championships. At the end of 2020, Wharton was added to the All Road Management stable managed by Nicolas Todt.

=== Formula 4 ===
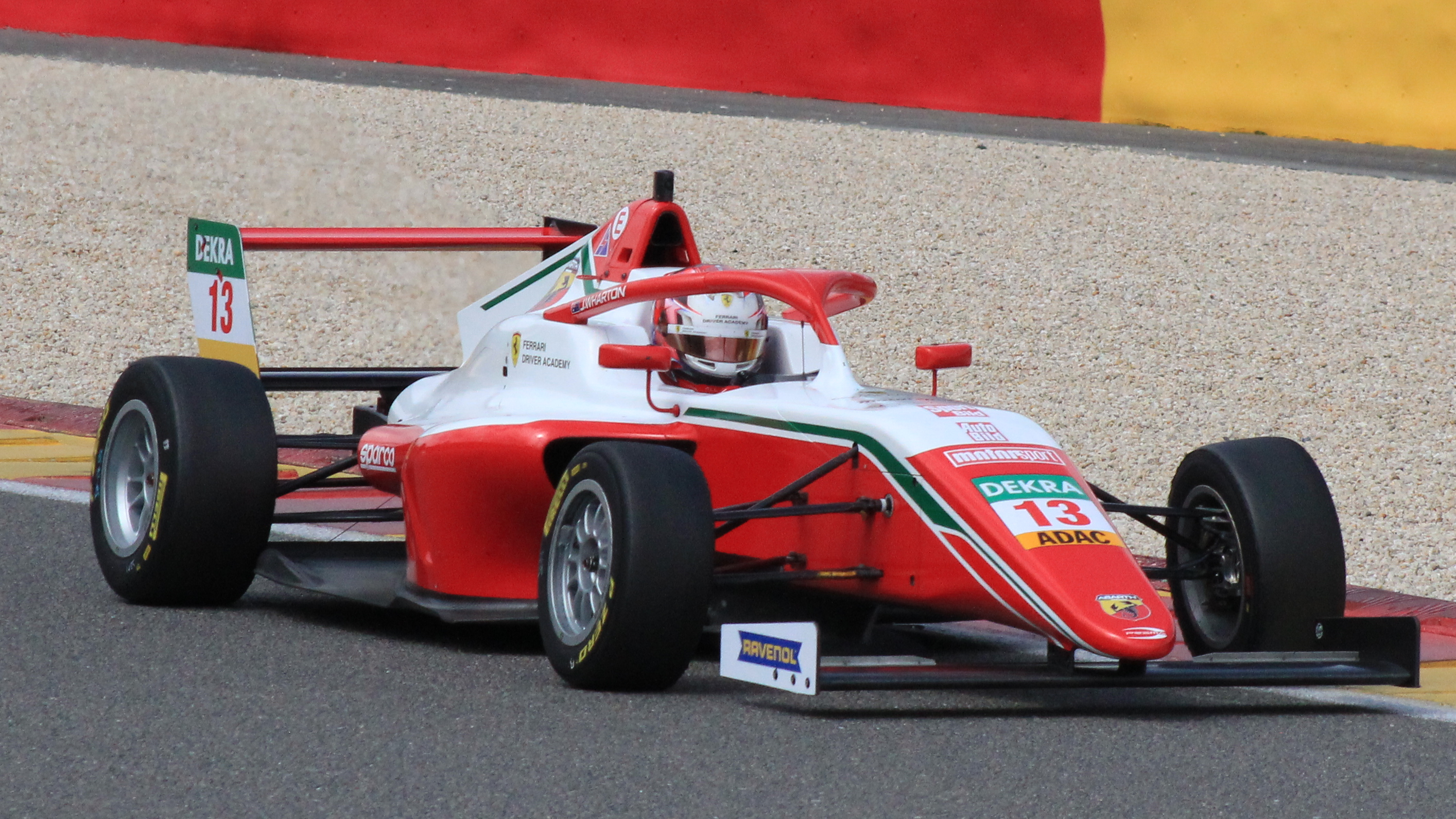
Wharton at Spa-Francorchamps during the 2022 ADAC Formula 4 Championship

==== 2022 ====
Starting his single-seater at the beginning of 2022, Wharton would compete in the Formula 4 UAE Championship with Abu Dhabi Racing, a team operated by Prema Racing. He took a third-place rostrum on his debut, during the opening round in Yas Marina. He proceeded to dominate the first Dubai event, scoring three victories out of the four races. He was only expected to compete in the opening two rounds, but returned for the final two rounds. He would end the season with one more win during the final race in Yas Marina, finishing fifth in the standings with 168 points.

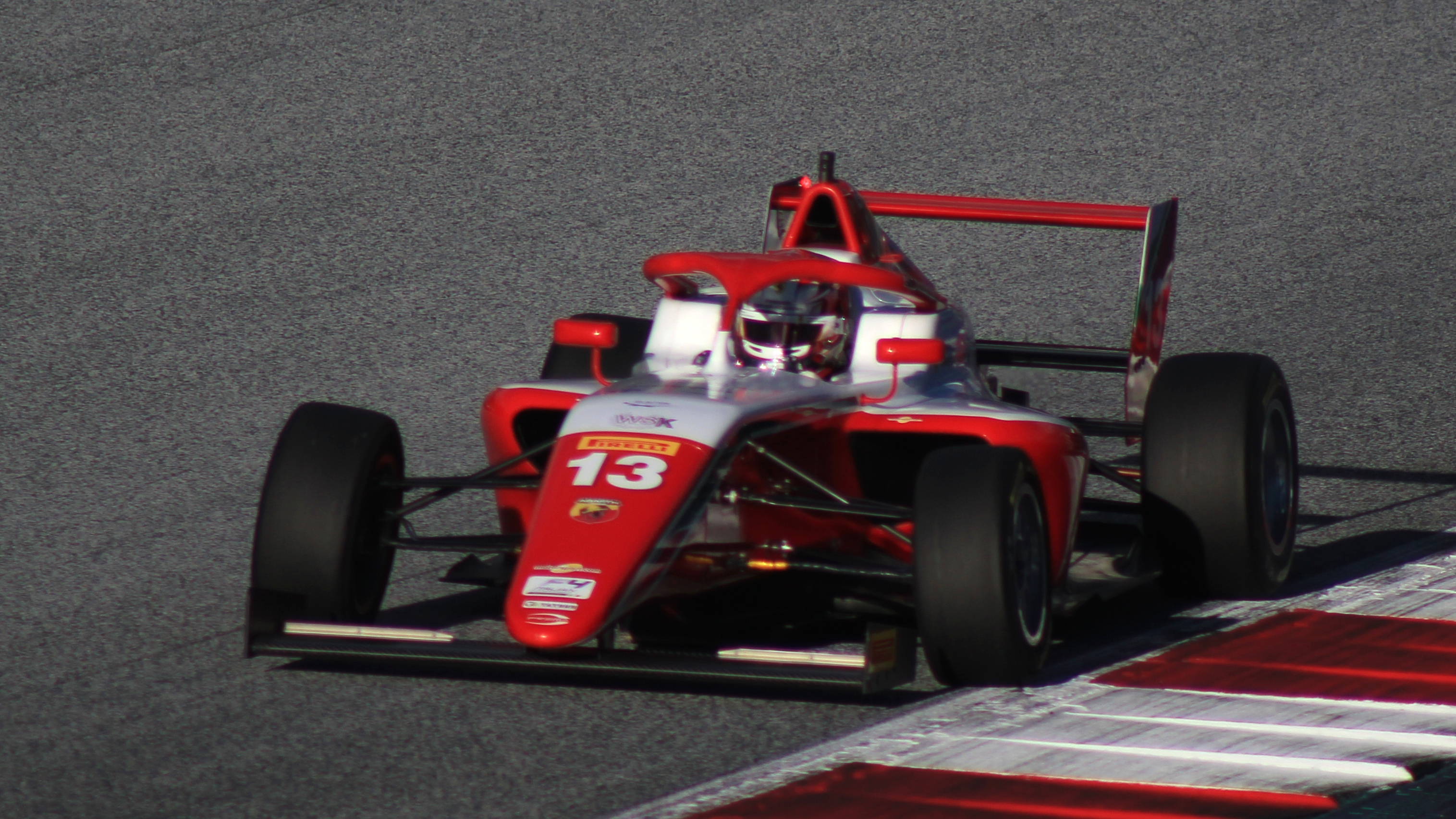
Wharton at the Red Bull Ring during the 2022 Italian F4 Championship

Wharton remained with Prema for the European racing season, driving in the Italian F4 and ADAC F4 championships. In ADAC F4, Wharton earned his first podium during the opening Spa-Francorchamps round, He then took a double podium during the second Nürburgring round, finishing fifth in the standings. but waited until the first Nürburgring round to stand on the rostrum again, this time being his only victory from both campaigns. In Italian F4, Wharton took a podium during each of the first five rounds, in a season dominated by teammate Andrea Kimi Antonelli; he also finished fifth in the standings.

==== 2023 ====
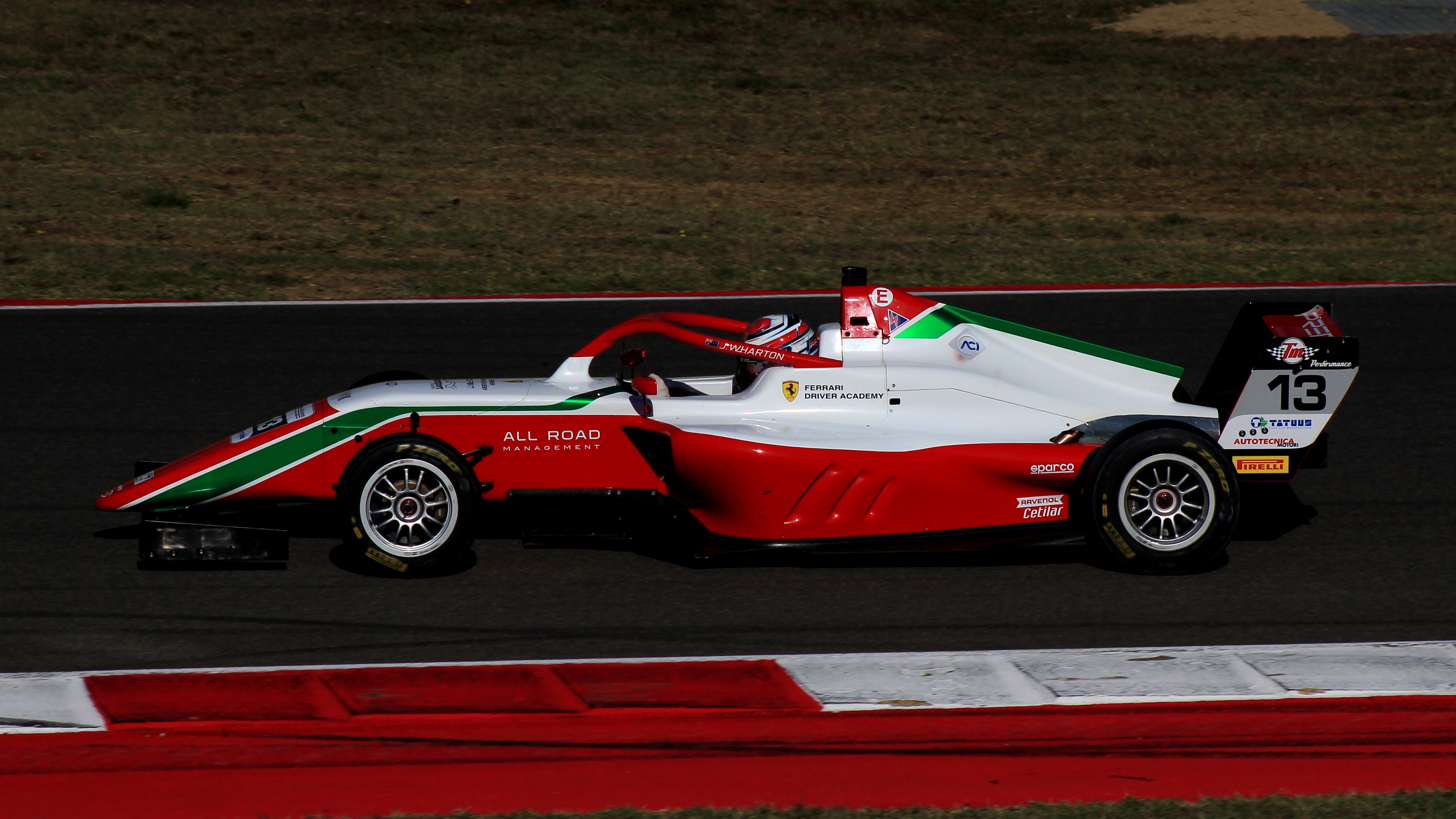
Wharton at the Mugello Circuit during the 2023 Italian F4 Championship.

Wharton once again partook in F4 UAE at the beginning of 2023, being part of the Mumbai Falcons. He opened the season with a podium in Dubai, before taking his first win of the year during the first race in Kuwait. He proceeded to lock out the podium during the second Kuwait round, which included winning the third race. He again repeated this feat in the second Dubai round despite not winning a race, but still gained the standings lead. Having taken triumphed the first two races during the Yas Marina finale, Wharton clinched the title as a result of a collision with title rival and teammate Tuukka Taponen during the final race; overall, he achieved four wins and eleven podiums throughout his campaign.

Wharton remained with Prema Racing for the Italian F4 Championship. He scored his first podiums of the campaign in round 2 at Misano, before following it up with a double victory in Spa-Francorchamps. He again took a double rostrum in Paul Ricard which included a pole position, but a fuel pump issue handed the win to Kacper Sztuka with a few corners to go. One more podium followed in Mugello followed, as Wharton would end the year fourth in the standings with two wins and eight podiums.

Wharton also competed in the newly-formed Euro 4 Championship with Prema. He placed on the podium during the first round in Mugello, which included a win from pole during the final race. After a third place in Monza, He ended the campaign with a further win in Barcelona, which placed him runner-up with two wins and three further podiums, missing out on the title to teammate Ugo Ugochukwu.

=== Formula Regional ===
==== 2024 ====
In the 2024 pre-season, Wharton partook in the Formula Regional Middle East Championship with Mumbai Falcons. He took his first Formula Regional podium in the fourth round at Yas Marina Circuit, finishing second behind Tuukka Taponen. With an additional podium in the penultimate race at Dubai Autodrome, he finished sixth overall in the standings.

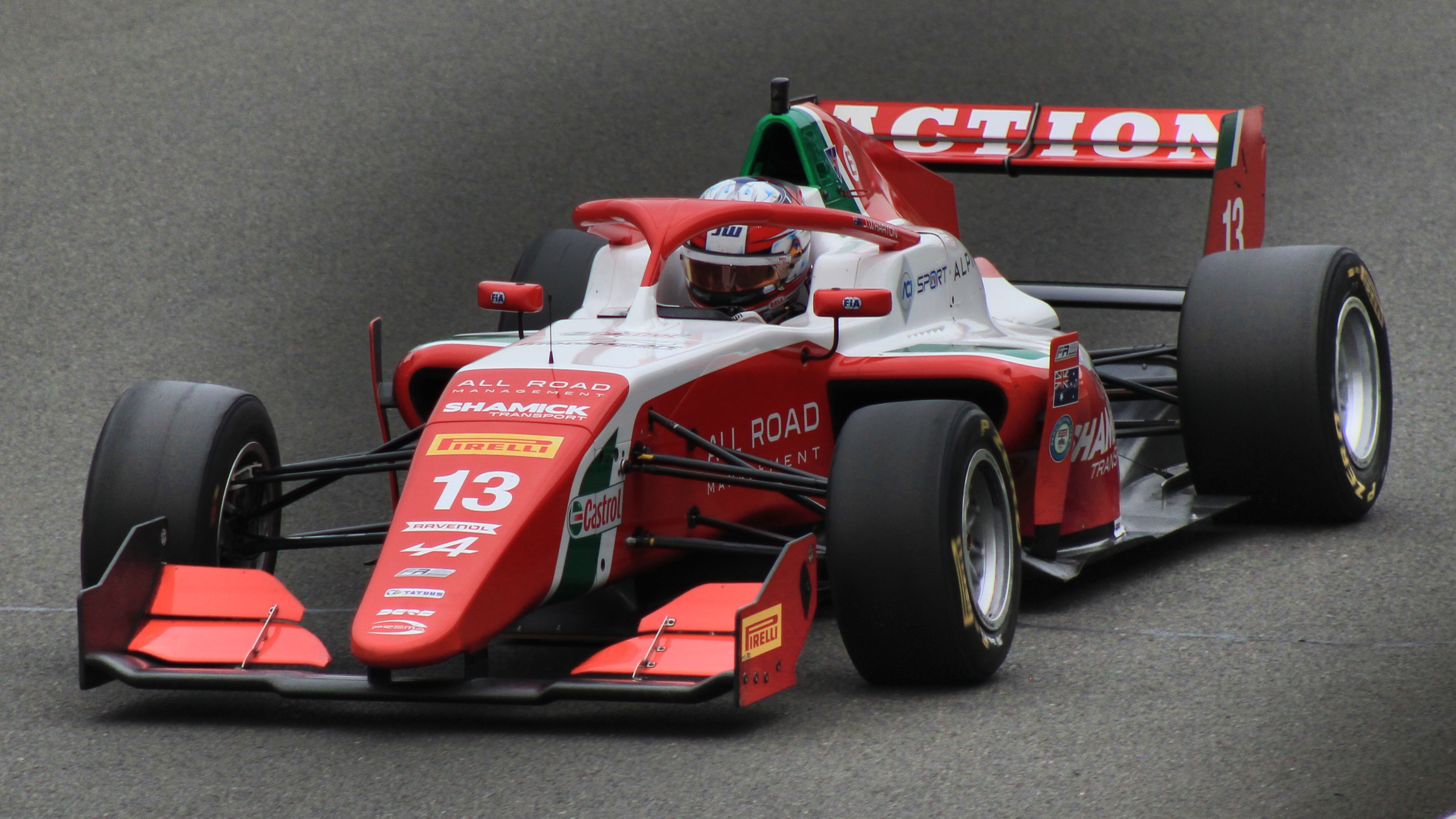
Wharton driving at the Hungaroring during the 2024 Formula Regional European Championship

For his main campaign, Wharton moved up to the Formula Regional European Championship, once again driving for Prema Racing, alongside former Italian F4 rivals Rafael Câmara and Ugo Ugochukwu. He finished on the podium in the opening race of the season at Hockenheim Before the season, he stated that he had "even more motivation to prove myself" after being dropped from the Ferrari Driver Academy. He started on pole position for the second race, but an incident with Pedro Clerot led to him retiring from the race. Similar misfortune would befall Wharton in Spa and Zandvoort, with a crash in qualifying at the former leading to a DNS in race one followed by another podium in race two, and a pole position at the latter leading to two non-points finishes.

However, Wharton's season began to turn around at Mugello, where he took his maiden Formula Regional win in race two. In Paul Ricard, he started 24th for race 2 following a puncture in qualifying, but made up fifteen positions to finish ninth. He followed it up with a pair of third places in Imola, and another win at Red Bull Ring, this time from pole position. A perfect weekend in Barcelona, where he won both races from pole position, propelled him to second overall in the standings. Another double third place in the Monza finale solidified himself as runner-up in the championship, having taken four wins, four poles, ten podiums and 234 points.

Wharton also participated in the 2024 Macau Grand Prix with ART Grand Prix. On lap 1 of the main race, Wharton crashed into the barriers at Lisboa, which caused a pileup that took him and several others out of the race.

==== 2026 ====
In preparation for his FIA Formula 3 campaign, Wharton would compete in the winter Formula Regional Oceania Trophy with HMD Motorsports.

=== GB3 Championship ===
Wharton was signed by Fortec Motorsports to participate in the two Silverstone rounds of the 2024 GB3 Championship. Across those rounds, Wharton recorded a best finish of eleventh twice.

=== FIA Formula 3 Championship ===
==== 2024 ====
After Martinius Stenshorne was banned from the Silverstone round, Wharton was drafted by Hitech Pulse-Eight to make a one-off appearance there in the 2024 FIA Formula 3 Championship. Despite the weekend being affected by wet weather, Wharton finished the races in a respectable 18th and 20th.

==== 2025 ====
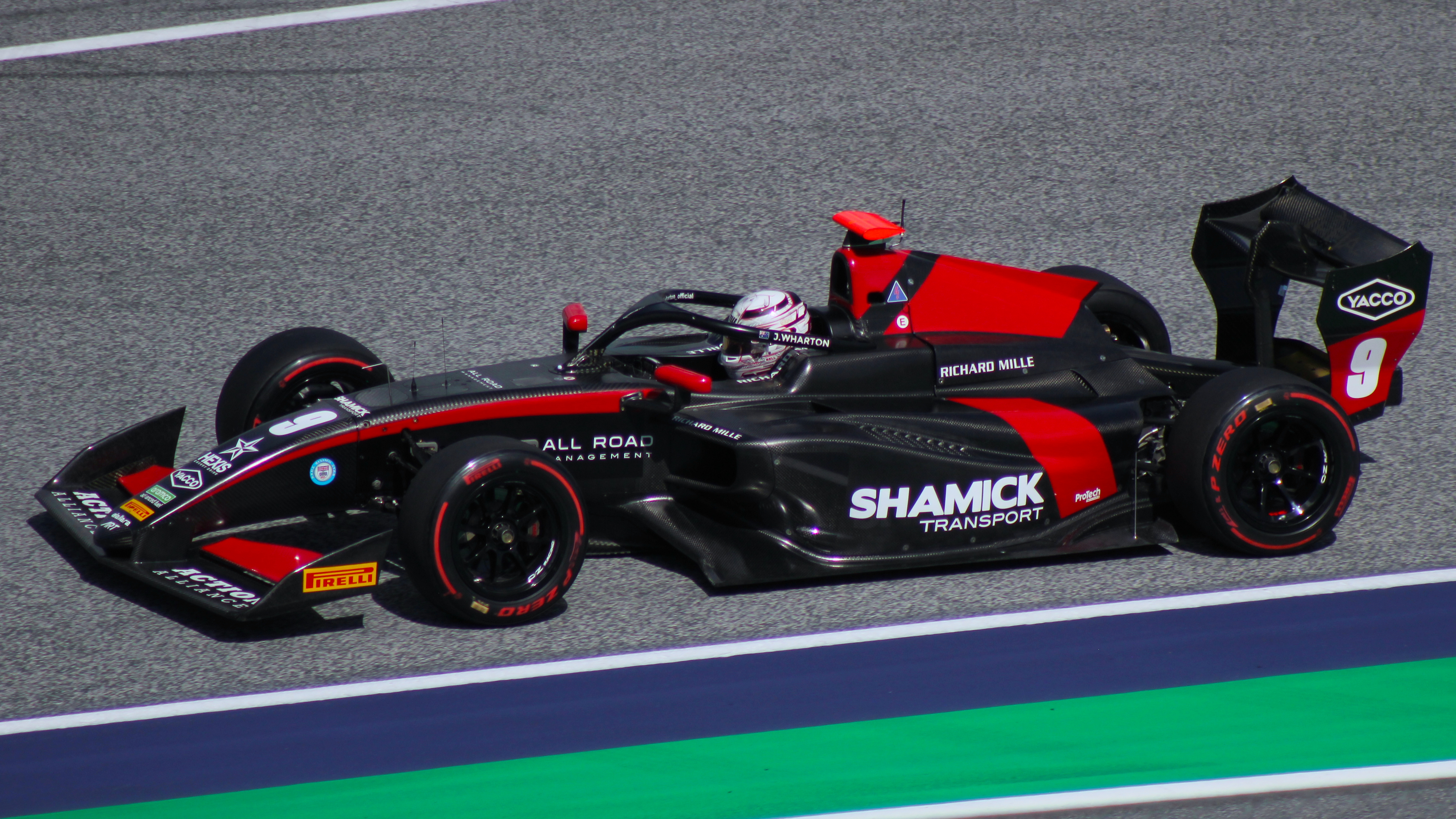
Wharton driving the Dallara F3 2025 during the 2025 Spielberg Formula 3 round

In October 2024, ART Grand Prix announced that Wharton would be racing for them in the 2025 FIA Formula 3 Championship, alongside Laurens van Hoepen and Ferrari Driver Academy member Tuukka Taponen. He had a tough start to the season as he failed to score points during the first four rounds, having taken a best finish of 11th during the Monaco feature race. He broke his duck and scored his first points next time out during the Barcelona sprint race, having capitalised on a first-lap incident. His momentum continued into Austria, where he secured his first victory of the year from reverse pole in the sprint race, having fended off Alessandro Giusti throughout the race. In the Silverstone feature race, Wharton gambled by starting on wet tyres on a progressively wetter track, which paid off as he finished in sixth. He qualified a season-best tenth and started third for the Budapest sprint race, converting this into a fifth place finish. This would be his final points finish of the season, as Wharton finished eighteenth in the standings with 25 points, notably behind teammates Taponen and Van Hoepen.

==== 2026 ====
Wharton reunited to Prema Racing to contest his second season of Formula 3 in 2026, partnering José Garfias and Louis Sharp.

=== FIA Formula 2 Championship ===
==== 2025 ====
At the end of 2025, Wharton joined Trident to make his Formula 2 debut in the Qatar round, partnering Laurens van Hoepen.

==== 2027 ====
Wharton will move up to Formula 2 in 2027, re-joining Trident for his first full season in the category.

=== Formula One ===
At the end of 2020, Wharton was chosen by Motorsport Australia to be one of its representatives for the FDA 2020 Scouting World Finals. He ended up winning the shootout, therefore gaining a place in the Ferrari Driver Academy.

In December 2023, it was announced that Wharton would be leaving the FDA going into the 2024 season.

== Karting record ==
=== Karting career summary ===
| Season | Series | Team | Position |
|---|---|---|---|
| 2015 | SKUSA SuperNationals — TaG Cadet | | 43rd |
| 2016 | Australian Kart Championship — Cadet 12 | | 4th |
| 2016 | SKUSA SuperNationals — Mini Swift | Kartsport North America | 26th |
| 2016 | Rotax Max Challenge Grand Finals — Mini MAX | International Karting Distribution | 15th |
| 2017 | Australian Kart Championship — Cadet 12 | | **1st** |
| 2017 | ROK Cup International Final — Mini ROK | Parolin Racing Team | 7th |
| 2017 | SKUSA SuperNationals — Mini Swift | KartSport North America | 14th |
| 2017 | Rotax Max Challenge Grand Finals — Mini MAX | Int Karting Distributors | **3rd** |
| 2018 | South Garda Winter Cup — OKJ | Parolin Racing Kart | 32nd |
| 2018 | Victorian Kart Championship — KA3 Junior | | **2nd** |
| 2018 | Rotax Max Challenge Euro Trophy — Junior | | **2nd** |
| 2018 | CIK-FIA European Championship — OKJ | Parolin Racing Kart | NC |
| 2018 | CIK-FIA World Championship — OKJ | Parolin Racing Kart | 13th |
| 2018 | WSK Final Cup — OKJ | Parolin Racing Kart | 7th |
| 2018 | SKUSA SuperNationals — KA100 Junior | KartSport North America | **1st** |
| 2018 | SKUSA SuperNationals — X30 Junior | KartSport North America | 18th |
| 2019 | WSK Champions Cup — OKJ | Ricky Flynn Motorsport | 5th |
| 2019 | South Garda Winter Cup — OKJ | Ricky Flynn Motorsport | **2nd** |
| 2019 | WSK Super Master Series — OKJ | Ricky Flynn Motorsport | 9th |
| 2019 | WSK Euro Series — OKJ | Ricky Flynn Motorsport | 9th |
| 2019 | IAME Euro Series — X30 Junior | Piers Sexton Racing | 49th |
| 2019 | Italian Championship — OKJ | | 4th |
| 2019 | Coupe de France — OKJ | | 11th |
| 2019 | German Karting Championship — Junior | Ricky Flynn Motorsport | 12th |
| 2019 | CIK-FIA European Championship — OKJ | Ricky Flynn Motorsport | 9th |
| 2019 | CIK-FIA World Championship — OKJ | Parolin Racing Kart | 31st |
| 2019 | Trofeo delle Industrie — OKJ | Parolin Racing Kart | 4th |
| 2019 | IAME International Final — X30 Junior | Parolin Racing Kart | 13th |
| 2019 | WSK Open Cup — OKJ | Parolin Racing Kart | 13th |
| 2019 | WSK Final Cup — OKJ | Parolin Racing Kart | 7th |
| 2019 | SKUSA SuperNationals — KA100 Junior | | **3rd** |
| 2019 | SKUSA SuperNationals — X30 Junior | | **1st** |
| 2020 | WSK Champions Cup — OK | Parolin Racing Kart | 31st |
| 2020 | South Garda Winter Cup — OK | Parolin Racing Kart | 11th |
| 2020 | WSK Super Master Series — OK | Parolin Racing Kart | 18th |
| 2020 | CIK-FIA European Championship — OK | Parolin Racing Kart | 20th |
| 2020 | WSK Euro Series — OK | Parolin Racing Kart | 7th |
| 2020 | Champions of the Future — OK | Parolin Racing Kart | 32nd |
| 2020 | CIK-FIA World Championship — OK | Parolin Racing Kart | 17th |
| 2021 | WSK Champions Cup — OK | Parolin Motorsport | 33rd |
| 2021 | WSK Super Master Series — KZ2 | Parolin Motorsport | 34th |
| 2021 | WSK Super Master Series — OK | Parolin Motorsport | 36th |
| 2021 | WSK Euro Series — OK | Parolin Motorsport | 25th |
| 2021 | Champions of the Future — OK | Parolin Motorsport | 29th |
| 2021 | CIK-FIA European Championship — OK | Parolin Motorsport | 23rd |
| 2021 | CIK-FIA European Championship — KZ2 | Parolin Motorsport | 15th |
| 2021 | CIK-FIA Karting International Super Cup — KZ2 | Parolin Motorsport | 5th |

=== Complete CIK-FIA Karting European Championship results ===
(key) (Races in bold indicate pole position) (Races in italics indicate fastest lap)

| Year | Team | Class | 1 | 2 | 3 | 4 | 5 | 6 | 7 | 8 | DC | Points |
|---|---|---|---|---|---|---|---|---|---|---|---|---|
| 2018 | Parolin Racing Kart | OKJ | SAR; QH | SAR; R | PFI; QH; 41 | PFI; R DNQ | AMP; QH | AMP; R | LEM; QH | LEM; R | NC | 0 |
| 2019 | Ricky Flynn Motorsport | OKJ | ANG; QH; 2 | ANG; R DNS | GEN; QH; 47 | GEN; R DNQ | KRI; QH; 14 | KRI; R 9 | LEM; QH; 4 | LEM; R 5 | 9th | 34 |
| 2020 | Parolin Racing Kart | OK | ZUE; QH; 39 | ZUE; R DNQ | SAR; QH; 27 | SAR; R 12 | WAC; QH; 33 | WAC; R 26 | | | 20th | 4 |
| 2021 | Parolin Motorsport | OK | GEN; QH; 14 | GEN; R 14 | AUB; QH; 38 | AUB; R DNQ | SAR; QH; 21 | SAR; R 12 | ZUE; QH; 34 | ZUE; R 20 | 23rd | 7 |
| 2021 | Parolin Motorsport | KZ2 | WAC; QH; 26 | WAC; R 8 | GEN; QH; 42 | GEN; R DNQ | | | | | 15th | 8 |

== Racing record ==
=== Racing career summary ===
| Season | Series | Team | Races | Wins | Poles | F/Laps | Podiums | Points | Position |
|---|---|---|---|---|---|---|---|---|---|
| 2022 | Formula 4 UAE Championship | Abu Dhabi Racing by Prema | 16 | 4 | 3 | 4 | 5 | 168 | 5th |
| 2022 | Italian F4 Championship | Prema Racing | 20 | 0 | 0 | 0 | 5 | 166 | 5th |
| 2022 | ADAC Formula 4 Championship | Prema Racing | 15 | 1 | 0 | 2 | 3 | 146 | 5th |
| 2023 | Formula 4 UAE Championship | Mumbai Falcons Racing Limited | 15 | 4 | 4 | 5 | 11 | 232 | **1st** |
| 2023 | Italian F4 Championship | Prema Racing | 21 | 2 | 3 | 2 | 8 | 205.5 | 4th |
| 2023 | Euro 4 Championship | Prema Racing | 9 | 2 | 1 | 1 | 5 | 169 | **2nd** |
| 2024 | Formula Regional Middle East Championship | Mumbai Falcons Racing Limited | 15 | 0 | 0 | 0 | 2 | 111 | 6th |
| 2024 | Formula Regional European Championship | Prema Racing | 19 | 4 | 5 | 2 | 10 | 236 | **2nd** |
| 2024 | GB3 Championship | Fortec Motorsports | 5 | 0 | 0 | 0 | 0 | 30 | 25th |
| 2024 | FIA Formula 3 Championship | Hitech Pulse-Eight | 2 | 0 | 0 | 0 | 0 | 0 | 33rd |
| 2024 | Macau Grand Prix | ART Grand Prix | 1 | 0 | 0 | 0 | 0 | N/A | DNF |
| 2025 | FIA Formula 3 Championship | ART Grand Prix | 19 | 1 | 0 | 0 | 1 | 25 | 18th |
| 2025 | FIA Formula 2 Championship | Trident | 2 | 0 | 0 | 0 | 0 | 0 | 27th |
| 2026 | Formula Regional Oceania Trophy | HMD Motorsports with TJ Speed | 11 | 1 | 0 | 1 | 2 | 167 | 8th |
| 2026 | FIA Formula 3 Championship | Prema Racing | 18 | 1 | 0 | 3 | 2 | 39 | 17th |
| 2027 | FIA Formula 2 Championship | Trident | 0 | 0 | 0 | 0 | 0 | 0 | TBD |

* Season still in progress.

=== Complete Formula 4 UAE Championship results ===
(key) (Races in bold indicate pole position) (Races in italics indicate fastest lap)

| Year | Team | 1 | 2 | 3 | 4 | 5 | 6 | 7 | 8 | 9 | 10 | 11 | 12 | 13 | 14 | 15 | 16 | 17 | 18 | 19 | 20 | Pos | Points |
|---|---|---|---|---|---|---|---|---|---|---|---|---|---|---|---|---|---|---|---|---|---|---|---|
| 2022 | Prema Racing | YMC1; 1; 3 | YMC1; 2; 5 | YMC1; 3; 24 | YMC1; 4; 9 | **DUB1**; **1**; 1 | **DUB1**; **2**; 1 | **DUB1**; **3**; 1 | DUB1; 4; 6 | DUB2; 1 | DUB2; 2 | DUB2; 3 | DUB2; 4 | DUB3; 1; 8 | DUB3; 2; 11 | DUB3; 3; 10 | DUB3; 4; 4 | YMC2; 1 Ret | YMC2; 2; 14 | YMC2; 3; 4 | YMC2; 4; 1 | 5th | 168 |
| 2023 | Mumbai Falcons | DUB1; 1; 3 | DUB1; 2; 17 | DUB1; 3; 4 | KMT1; 1; 1 | KMT1; 2; 2 | **KMT1**; **3**; 13 | KMT2; 1; 2 | KMT2; 2; 2 | **KMT2**; **3**; 1 | DUB2; 1; 2 | DUB2; 2; 2 | DUB2; 3; 3 | **YMC**; **1**; 1 | YMC; 2; 1 | **YMC**; **3** Ret | | | | | | 1st | 232 |

=== Complete ADAC Formula 4 Championship results ===
(key) (Races in bold indicate pole position) (Races in italics indicate fastest lap)

| Year | Team | 1 | 2 | 3 | 4 | 5 | 6 | 7 | 8 | 9 | 10 | 11 | 12 | 13 | 14 | 15 | 16 | 17 | 18 | DC | Points |
|---|---|---|---|---|---|---|---|---|---|---|---|---|---|---|---|---|---|---|---|---|---|
| 2022 | Prema Racing | SPA; 1 Ret | SPA; 2; 3 | SPA; 3; 9 | HOC; 1; 18 | HOC; 2; 6 | HOC; 3 Ret | ZAN; 1; 5 | ZAN; 2; 4 | ZAN; 3; 6 | NÜR1; 1; 4 | NÜR1; 2; 5 | NÜR1; 3; 1 | LAU; 1 | LAU; 2 | LAU; 3 | NÜR2; 1; 3 | NÜR2; 2; 5 | NÜR2; 3; 4 | 5th | 146 |

=== Complete Italian F4 Championship results ===
(key) (Races in bold indicate pole position) (Races in italics indicate fastest lap)

| Year | Team | 1 | 2 | 3 | 4 | 5 | 6 | 7 | 8 | 9 | 10 | 11 | 12 | 13 | 14 | 15 | 16 | 17 | 18 | 19 | 20 | 21 | 22 | DC | Points |
|---|---|---|---|---|---|---|---|---|---|---|---|---|---|---|---|---|---|---|---|---|---|---|---|---|---|
| 2022 | Prema Racing | IMO; 1; 4 | IMO; 2; 3 | IMO; 3; 9 | MIS; 1; 5 | MIS; 2; 3 | MIS; 3; 29† | SPA; 1; 3 | SPA; 2; 5 | SPA; 3 Ret | VLL; 1; 3 | VLL; 2; 7 | VLL; 3; 4 | RBR; 1; 2 | RBR; 2; 6 | RBR; 3 | RBR; 4; 4 | MNZ; 1; 30† | MNZ; 2; 15 | MNZ; 3 C | MUG; 1 Ret | MUG; 2; 7 | MUG; 3; 5 | 5th | 166 |
| 2023 | Prema Racing | IMO; 1; 23† | IMO; 2 | IMO; 3; 5 | IMO; 4; 12 | MIS; 1; 3 | MIS; 2; 2 | MIS; 3; 28 | **SPA**; **1**; 1 | **SPA**; **2**; 1 | SPA; 3; 3 | MNZ; 1; 6 | MNZ; 2; 5 | MNZ; 3; 5 | LEC; 1; 3 | LEC; 2 Ret | **LEC**; **3**; 2 | MUG; 1; 8 | MUG; 2; 9 | MUG; 3; 3 | VLL; 1; 5 | VLL; 2; 6 | VLL; 3; 4 | 4th | 205.5 |

=== Complete Euro 4 Championship results ===
(key) (Races in bold indicate pole position; races in italics indicate fastest lap)

| Year | Team | 1 | 2 | 3 | 4 | 5 | 6 | 7 | 8 | 9 | DC | Points |
|---|---|---|---|---|---|---|---|---|---|---|---|---|
| 2023 | Prema Racing | MUG; 1; 6 | MUG; 2; 3 | **MUG**; **3**; 1 | MNZ; 1; 3 | MNZ; 2; 8 | MNZ; 3 Ret | CAT; 1; 3 | CAT; 2; 1 | CAT; 3; 4 | 2nd | 169 |

=== Complete Formula Regional Middle East Championship results ===
(key) (Races in bold indicate pole position) (Races in italics indicate fastest lap)

| Year | Entrant | 1 | 2 | 3 | 4 | 5 | 6 | 7 | 8 | 9 | 10 | 11 | 12 | 13 | 14 | 15 | DC | Points |
|---|---|---|---|---|---|---|---|---|---|---|---|---|---|---|---|---|---|---|
| 2024 | Mumbai Falcons Racing Limited | YMC1; 1; 4 | YMC1; 2; 24 | YMC1; 3; 7 | YMC2; 1; 5 | YMC2; 2 Ret | YMC2; 3; 5 | DUB1; 1; 28† | DUB1; 2; 12 | DUB1; 3; 5 | YMC3; 1; 5 | YMC3; 2; 4 | YMC3; 3; 2 | DUB2; 1; 6 | DUB2; 2; 3 | DUB2; 3; 11 | 6th | 111 |

=== Complete Formula Regional European Championship results ===
(key) (Races in bold indicate pole position) (Races in italics indicate fastest lap)

| Year | Team | 1 | 2 | 3 | 4 | 5 | 6 | 7 | 8 | 9 | 10 | 11 | 12 | 13 | 14 | 15 | 16 | 17 | 18 | 19 | 20 | DC | Points |
|---|---|---|---|---|---|---|---|---|---|---|---|---|---|---|---|---|---|---|---|---|---|---|---|
| 2024 | Prema Racing | HOC; 1; 3 | **HOC**; **2** Ret | SPA; 1 DNS | SPA; 2; 3 | **ZAN**; **1**; 13 | ZAN; 2; 14 | HUN; 1; 6 | HUN; 2; 4 | MUG; 1; 7 | MUG; 2; 1 | LEC; 1; 6 | LEC; 2; 9 | IMO; 1; 3 | IMO; 2; 3 | **RBR**; **1**; 1 | RBR; 2; 5 | **CAT**; **1**; 1 | **CAT**; **2**; 1 | MNZ; 1; 3 | MNZ; 2; 3 | 2nd | 236 |

=== Complete GB3 Championship results ===
(key) (Races in bold indicate pole position) (Races in italics indicate fastest lap)

| Year | Team | 1 | 2 | 3 | 4 | 5 | 6 | 7 | 8 | 9 | 10 | 11 | 12 | 13 | 14 | 15 | 16 | 17 | 18 | 19 | 20 | 21 | 22 | 23 | 24 | DC | Points |
|---|---|---|---|---|---|---|---|---|---|---|---|---|---|---|---|---|---|---|---|---|---|---|---|---|---|---|---|
| 2024 | Fortec Motorsports | OUL; 1 | OUL; 2 | OUL; 3 | SIL1; 1; 20 | SIL1; 2; 11 | SIL1; 3 C | SPA; 1 | SPA; 2 | SPA; 3 | HUN; 1 | HUN; 2 | HUN; 3 | ZAN; 1 | ZAN; 2 | ZAN; 3 | SIL2; 1; 11 | SIL2; 2; 15 | SIL2; 3; 15 | DON; 1 | DON; 2 | DON; 3 | BRH; 1 | BRH; 2 | BRH; 3 | 25th | 30 |

=== Complete Macau Grand Prix results ===
| Year | Team | Car | Qualifying | Quali Race | Main race |
|---|---|---|---|---|---|
| 2024 | (France) ART Grand Prix | Tatuus F3 T-318 | 11th | 7th | DNF |

=== Complete FIA Formula 3 Championship results ===
(key) (Races in bold indicate pole position) (Races in italics indicate fastest lap)

| Year | Entrant | 1 | 2 | 3 | 4 | 5 | 6 | 7 | 8 | 9 | 10 | 11 | 12 | 13 | 14 | 15 | 16 | 17 | 18 | 19 | 20 | DC | Points |
|---|---|---|---|---|---|---|---|---|---|---|---|---|---|---|---|---|---|---|---|---|---|---|---|
| 2024 | Hitech Pulse-Eight | BHR; SPR | BHR; FEA | MEL; SPR | MEL; FEA | IMO; SPR | IMO; FEA | MON; SPR | MON; FEA | CAT; SPR | CAT; FEA | RBR; SPR | RBR; FEA | SIL; SPR; 18 | SIL; FEA; 21 | HUN; SPR | HUN; FEA | SPA; SPR | SPA; FEA | MNZ; SPR | MNZ; FEA | 33rd | 0 |
| 2025 | ART Grand Prix | MEL; SPR; Ret | MEL; FEA; 21 | BHR; SPR; 13 | BHR; FEA; 28 | IMO; SPR; 22 | IMO; FEA; 13 | MON; SPR; 21 | MON; FEA; 11 | CAT; SPR; 8 | CAT; FEA; 16 | RBR; SPR; 1 | RBR; FEA; 14 | SIL; SPR; 16 | SIL; FEA; 6 | SPA; SPR; 20 | SPA; FEA; C | HUN; SPR; 5 | HUN; FEA; 27† | MNZ; SPR; 16 | MNZ; FEA; 16 | 18th | 25 |
| 2026 | Prema Racing | MEL; SPR; 7 | MEL; FEA; WD | MON; SPR; 15 | MON; FEA; 18 | CAT; SPR; 1 | CAT; FEA; 12 | RBR; SPR; 4 | RBR; FEA; 11 | SIL; SPR; 10 | SIL; FEA; 11 | SPA; SPR; 27 | SPA; FEA; 17 | HUN; SPR; 8 | HUN; FEA; 7 | MNZ; SPR; 21 | MNZ; FEA; 10 | MAD; SPR; 2 | MAD; FEA1; 10 | MAD; FEA2; 16 | | 17th | 39 |

=== Complete FIA Formula 2 Championship results ===
(key) (Races in bold indicate pole position) (Races in italics indicate fastest lap)

| Year | Entrant | 1 | 2 | 3 | 4 | 5 | 6 | 7 | 8 | 9 | 10 | 11 | 12 | 13 | 14 | 15 | 16 | 17 | 18 | 19 | 20 | 21 | 22 | 23 | 24 | 25 | 26 | 27 | 28 | DC | Points |
|---|---|---|---|---|---|---|---|---|---|---|---|---|---|---|---|---|---|---|---|---|---|---|---|---|---|---|---|---|---|---|---|
| 2025 | Trident | MEL; SPR | MEL; FEA | BHR; SPR | BHR; FEA | JED; SPR | JED; FEA | IMO; SPR | IMO; FEA | MON; SPR | MON; FEA | CAT; SPR | CAT; FEA | RBR; SPR | RBR; FEA | SIL; SPR | SIL; FEA | SPA; SPR | SPA; FEA | HUN; SPR | HUN; FEA | MNZ; SPR | MNZ; FEA | BAK; SPR | BAK; FEA | LSL; SPR; Ret | LSL; FEA; 19 | YMC; SPR | YMC; FEA | 27th | 0 |
| 2027 | Trident | BHR; SPR | BHR; FEA | JED; SPR | JED; FEA | MEL; SPR | MEL; FEA | MTL; SPR | MTL; FEA | MON; SPR | MON; FEA | SIL; SPR | SIL; FEA | RBR; SPR | RBR; FEA | MNZ; SPR | MNZ; FEA | MAD; SPR | MAD; FEA | BAK; SPR | BAK; FEA | IST; SPR | IST; FEA | MXC; SPR | MXC; FEA | LSL; SPR | LSL; FEA | YMC; SPR | YMC; FEA | TBD | TBD |

=== Complete Formula Regional Oceania Trophy results ===
(key) (Races in bold indicate pole position) (Races in italics indicate fastest lap)

| Year | Team | 1 | 2 | 3 | 4 | 5 | 6 | 7 | 8 | 9 | 10 | 11 | 12 | 13 | 14 | 15 | 16 | DC | Points |
|---|---|---|---|---|---|---|---|---|---|---|---|---|---|---|---|---|---|---|---|
| 2026 | HMD Motorsports with TJ Speed | HMP; 1; 10 | HMP; 2; 17 | HMP; 3; 5 | HMP; 4; 10 | TAU; 1; 6 | TAU; 2; 1 | TAU; 3; 5 | TAU; 4; 16 | TER; 1 | TER; 2 | TER; 3 | TER; 4 | HIG; 1 | HIG; 2; 6 | HIG; 3; 2 | HIG; 2; 8 | 8th | 167 |

=== Complete New Zealand Grand Prix results ===
| Year | Team | Car | Qualifying | Main race |
|---|---|---|---|---|
| 2026 | (United States) HMD Motorsports with TJ Speed | Tatuus FT-60 - Toyota | 9th | 8th |
