= Gabriele Minì =

Italian racing driver (born 2005)

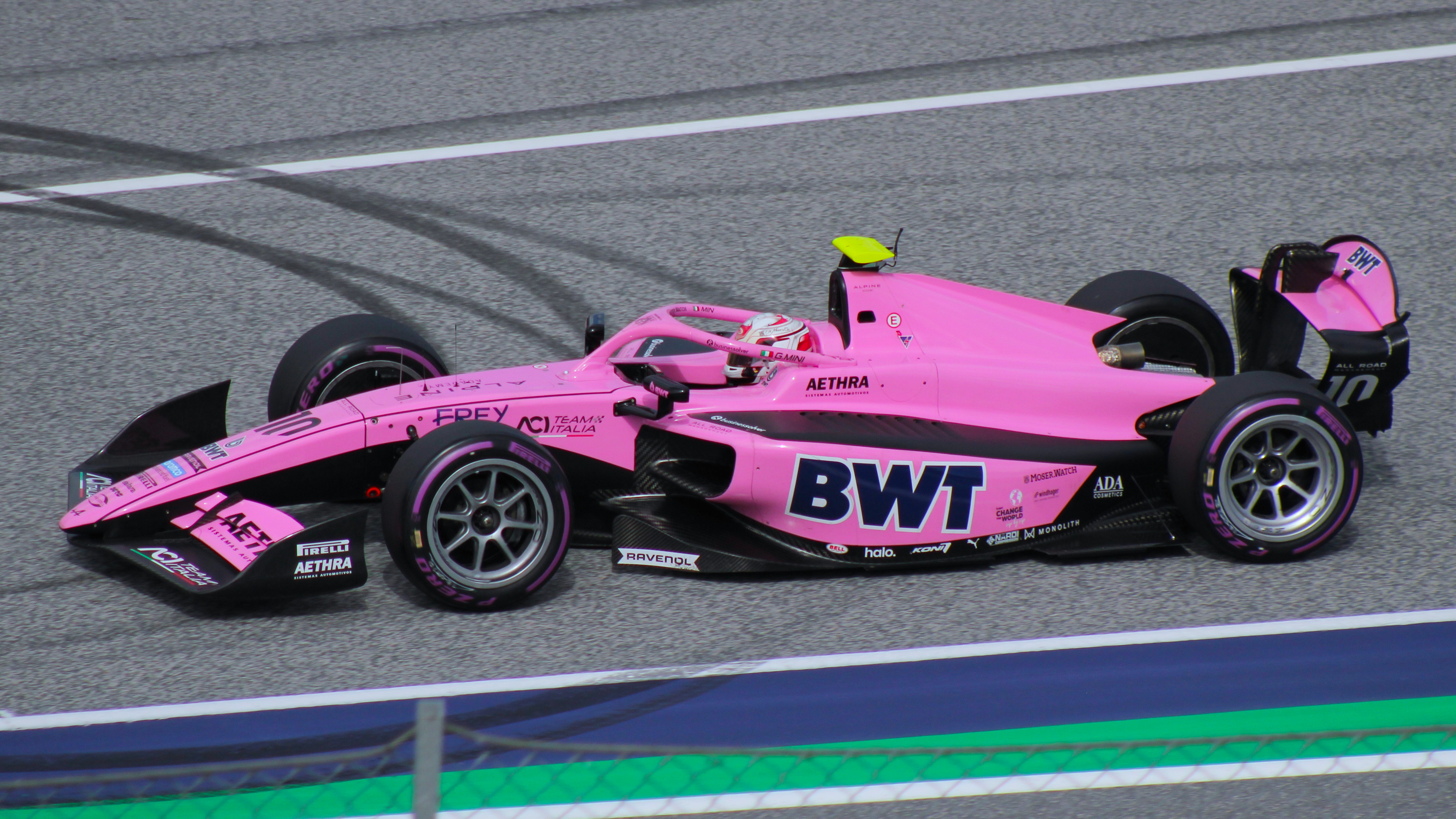
- Minì driving the Dallara F2 2024 during the 2025 Spielberg Formula 2 round
- Nationality: (Italy) Italian
- Born: 20 March 2005 (age 21) Palermo, Sicily, Italy

FIA Formula 2 Championship career
- Debut season: 2024
- Current team: MP Motorsport
- Car number: 9
- Former teams: Prema Racing, Hitech
- Starts: 47
- Wins: 2
- Podiums: 13
- Poles: 0
- Fastest laps: 3
- Best finish: 13th in 2025

Previous series
- 2023–2024; 2023; 2022; 2021–2022; 2020; 2020: FIA Formula 3; FR Middle East; FR Asian; FR European; ADAC F4; Italian F4

Championship titles
- 2020: Italian F4 Championship

Awards
- 2019: CIK-FIA Rookie of the Year
- Statistics up to date as of 25 August 2026.

Gabriele Minì (Italian pronunciation: [ɡabriˈɛːle miˈni]; born 20 March 2005) is an Italian racing driver who competes in the FIA Formula 2 Championship for MP Motorsport as part of the Alpine Academy after previously competing for Prema in 2025.

A member of the Alpine Academy since 2023, Minì is the 2020 Italian F4 Champion, and was runner-up during the 2022 Formula Regional European Championship and the 2024 FIA Formula 3 Championship.

== Personal life ==
Minì was born on 20 March 2005 and grew up in Marineo, a small city near Palermo in Sicily, Italy. His father is a mechanic who brought him up to the single-seater category.

== Career ==
=== Karting (2012–2019) ===
Minì started his karting career in 2012. His first karting title came in the Italian Championship in 2017 in the 60 Mini Class at the age of twelve. The year after, Minì mainly competed in international competitions, he became champion in the WSK Super Master Series, beating then Mercedes Academy driver Paul Aron among others, and finishing as runner-up in the CIK-FIA Karting World Championship. Following these achievements, Minì was signed to Nicolas Todt's All Road Management scheme. 2019 would be Minì's final year in karting; he finished second in the WSK Champions Cup and the FIA Karting European Championship respectively, and his achievements awarded him the FIA Karting Rookie of the Year.

=== Formula 4 (2020) ===
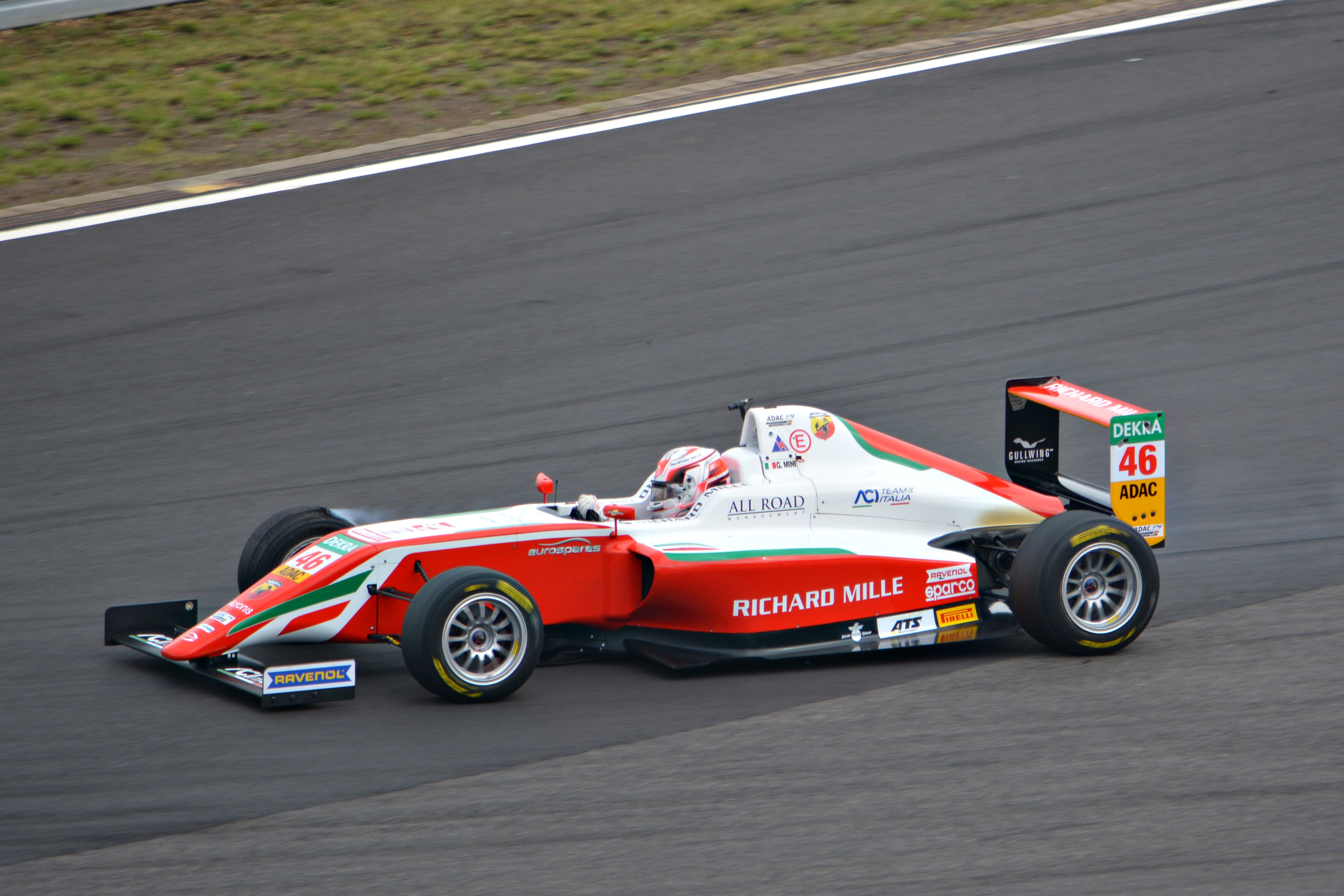
Minì racing in the 2020 ADAC Formula 4 Championship

In late January 2020, it was announced that Minì would make his car racing debut in the Italian F4 Championship and race in two rounds of the ADAC F4 Championship for Prema Powerteam alongside Sebastián Montoya, Gabriel Bortoleto and FDA-Member Dino Beganovic. Minì started his season off strongly by scoring all three pole positions at the first round in Misano, winning his first ever race in single-seaters. He would not score a podium during the first Imola round, although he finished each one of those races in the points. Minì bounced back with a hattrick of podiums at the Red Bull Ring, where he also won the third race of the weekend. A double podium followed the next round in Mugello, where he was also victorious in the final race. However in Monza, Minì only took one second place, as he was stripped from a win during the first race due to an illegal pass. In the second Imola round, a triple podium which included another win enlarged the points gap to his nearest rival Francesco Pizzi, such that a second-place finish in race two allowed Minì to be crowned champion of the series. He rounded out his season with a pole and a podium during the Vallelunga finale. Throughout his campaign, Minì took four wins, nine poles, twelve points and 284 points, becoming the youngest Italian F4 champion to date.

Minì also raced in two rounds of the ADAC F4 Championship, winning his first race in that series at the Nürburgring from pole position. After earning three more third-places in the next five races, Minì would finish tenth in the standings.

=== Formula Regional (2021–2023) ===
==== 2021 ====
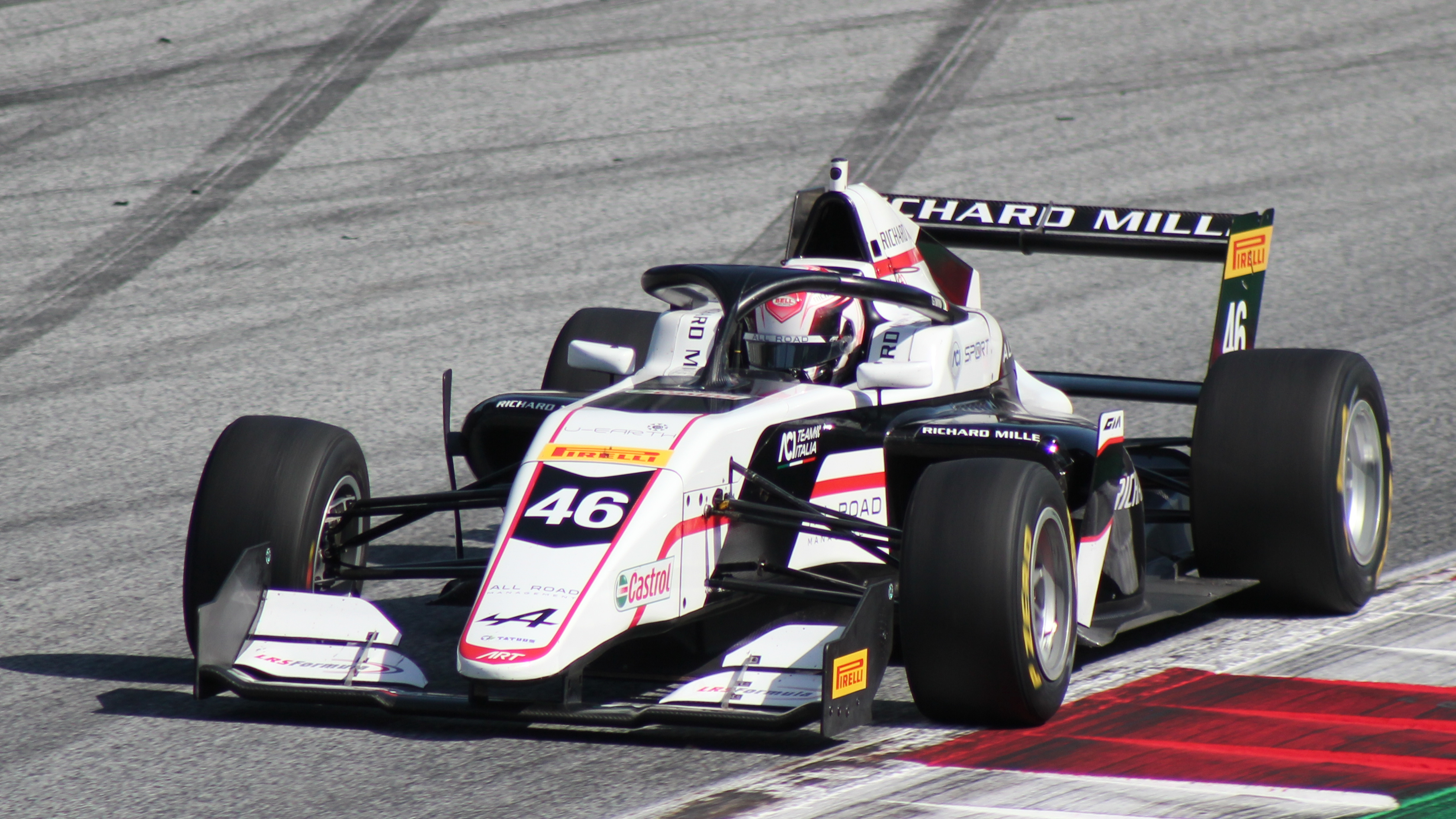
Minì racing in the 2021 Formula Regional European Championship at the Red Bull Ring

In December 2020, Minì took part in the post-season rookie test for the Formula Regional European Championship for ART Grand Prix alongside his F4 title rival Francesco Pizzi and Grégoire Saucy. Without prior experience in a car at that level Minì completed the second-fastest laptime of the day. After a second test later that month, the French outfit confirmed Minì would race with them in the 2021 season. He started his season off by scoring his first points in race 2 of the first round, with a sixth place also giving him the distinction of being the highest-placed rookie. In the second weekend in Barcelona, Minì achieved his first podium in the category in the first race, while he went on to score more points in the second race. After two tenth-placed finishes in Monaco, Minì returned to the podium in the first race at Paul Ricard. Minì had his best weekend of the season at Zandvoort, where he finished second and third, whilst also being the best rookie of the event. Minì did not score any podiums in the second half of the season, but did score consistently and finished the season seventh overall and second behind Isack Hadjar in the rookie standings.

==== 2022 ====
In the pre-season, Minì joined Hitech Grand Prix to partake in the Formula Regional Asian Championship. In the first round, Minì started strong with a podium in the first race, but not before taking his first pole and win in the series during the third race. A mixed second round in Dubai followed, as he was only able to salvage a fourth place in Race 3. After initially bein scheduled for only the first two rounds, Minì returned for the fourth round with points finishes. He ended his campaign strongly with another win and a podium finish in Yas Marina, lifting him to fourth in the standings with 130 points.

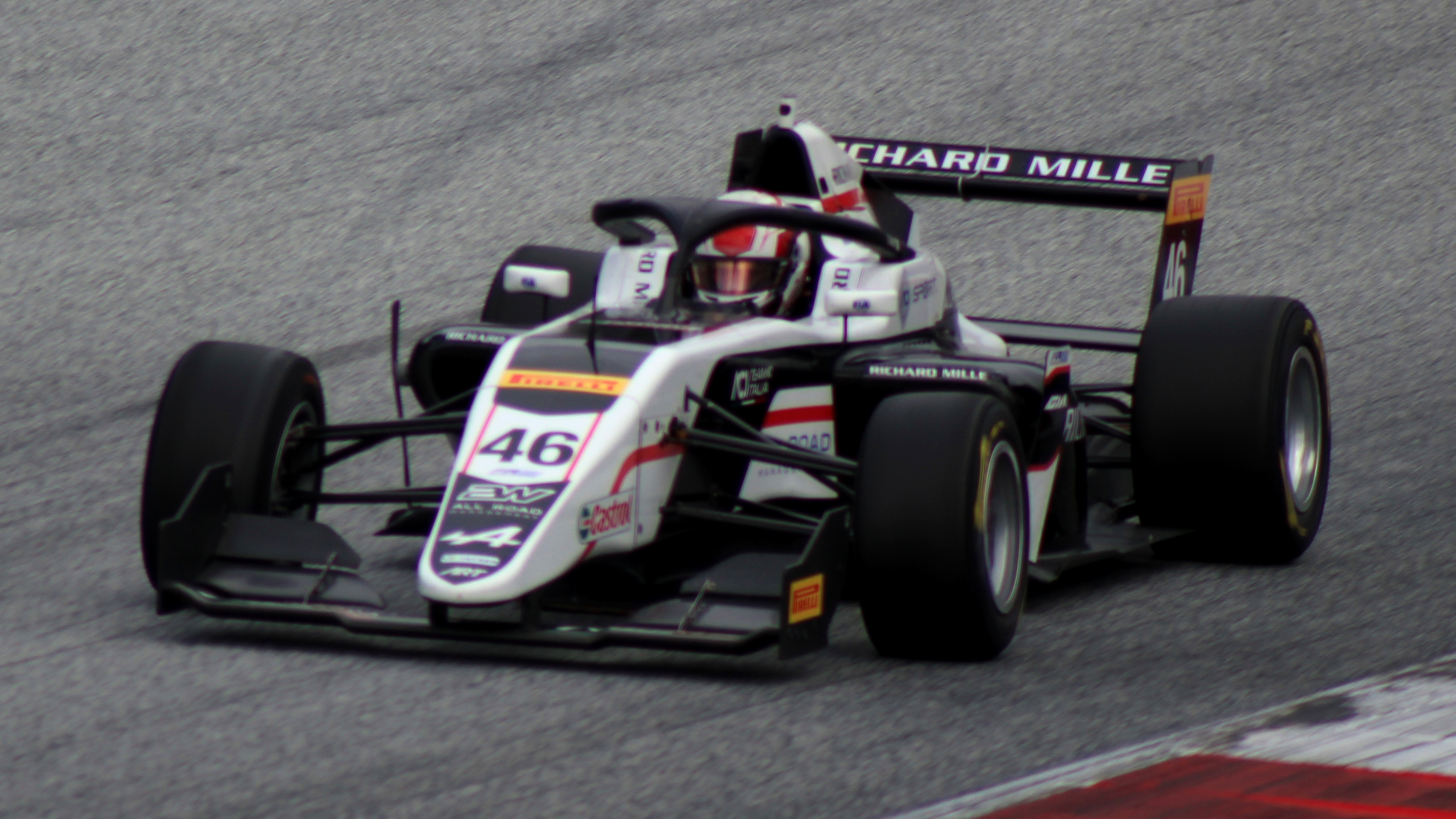
Minì racing in the 2022 Formula Regional European Championship at the Red Bull Ring

Minì remained with ART Grand Prix for the 2022 season. Minì started the season with a third place in the Monza opener, before taking a commanding double pole for Imola. He was stripped of his first win during the first race due to a false start, but secured redemption the next day in the wet with a first victory. Following a Monaco rostrum, Minì triumphed in Le Castellet, holding off championship leader Dino Beganovic for his second win. This was followed with a run of four consecutive podiums in Zandvoort and at the Hungaroring. However, Minì would be absent from the podium in the next three rounds, which included a disqualification from second place in the first Spa-Francorchamps race. Despite a total of nine podium finishes across the year, he was beaten to the title by Beganovic. However, Minì clinched second overall in the standings by winning the final race in Mugello by overcoming two rivals, allowing him to move ahead of Paul Aron in the standings by a single point.

==== 2023 ====
Minì joined Hitech Grand Prix for the 2023 Formula Regional Middle East Championship during the opening two rounds, to prepare for his main Formula 3 campaign. He took pole for the first race in Dubai, and despite leading most of the race, Minì celebrated one lap early thinking the race was over, which caused him to drop to sixth; a further time penalty for an aggressive maneuver with Dino Beganovic plummeted him outside the points. His only points of the campaign came during the third race, where he finished in fifth, resulting in Minì being confined to 22nd in the standings.

=== FIA Formula 3 (2023–2024) ===
==== 2023 ====
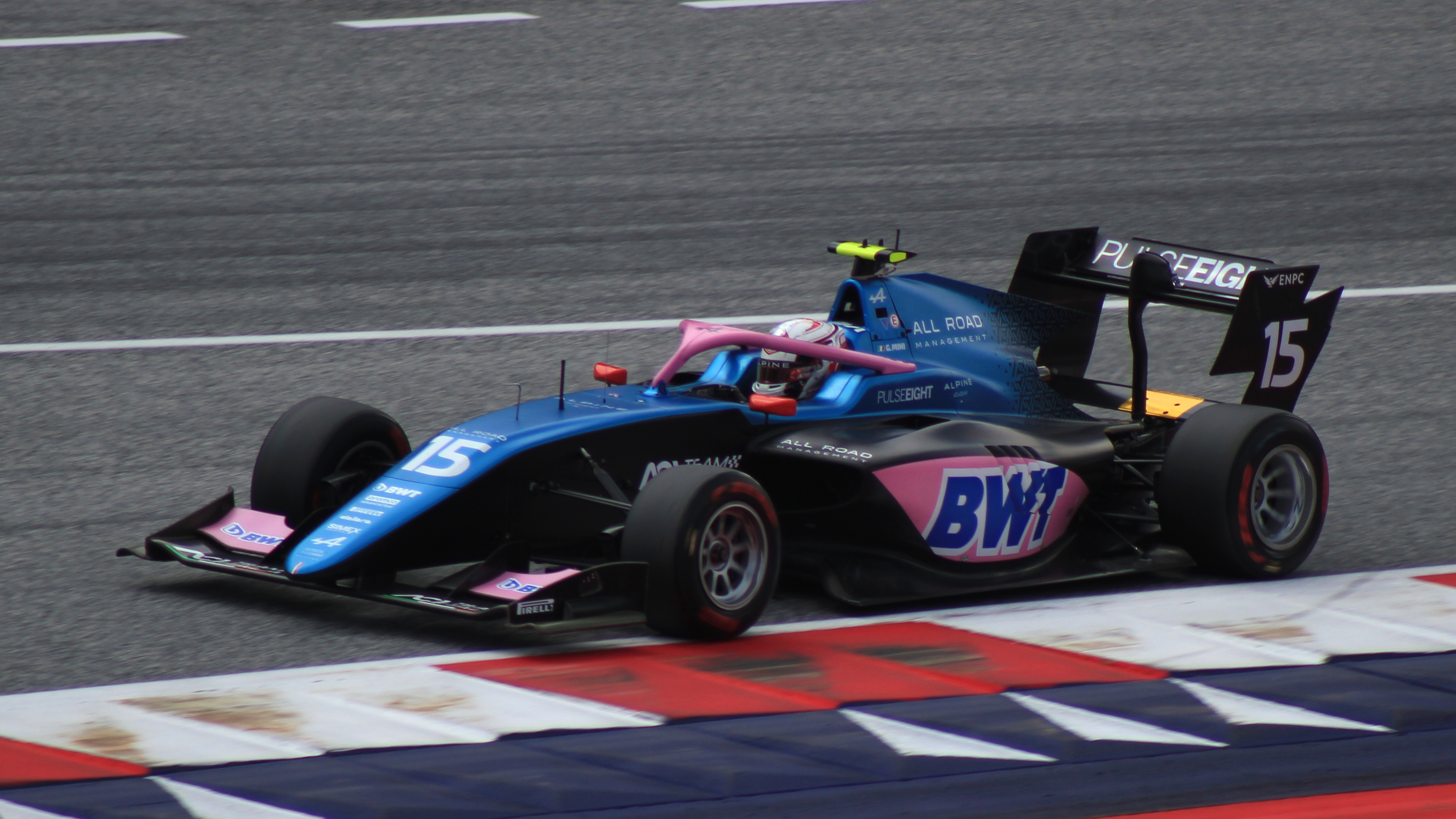
Minì driving the Dallara F3 2019 during the 2023 Spielberg Formula 3 round

In September 2022, Minì took part in the FIA Formula 3 post-season test at Jerez, driving for Hitech Grand Prix, setting the fastest lap during the first day. Minì ended up driving for the team during the 2023 FIA Formula 3 season, partnering Luke Browning and then Red Bull junior Sebastián Montoya. He began the campaign by claiming pole on debut at Sakhir. However, a five-second penalty for a starting grid infringement in the feature race meant that a commanding race which he ended first on track culminated in eighth place on the results sheet. Qualifying third in Melbourne, Minì made up six positions in the sprint race to finish fourth. In a relatively straightforward feature race, Minì defended third place against Leonardo Fornaroli during the closing laps to clinch his first Formula 3 podium. Minì took a second pole at Monaco, by an astonishing gap of six tenths. Having resisted race-long pressure from Dino Beganovic, Minì persevered as he took his maiden FIA F3 victory. A scoreless round at Barcelona followed; he collected a penalty for spinning Christian Mansell out in the sprint, while he lacked pace in the feature race. Minì qualified 11th and secured second place in a wet Spielberg sprint race, after battling for the lead. However, his fortunes took a reverse turn on Sunday as he retired on the opening lap due to contact with teammate Browning.

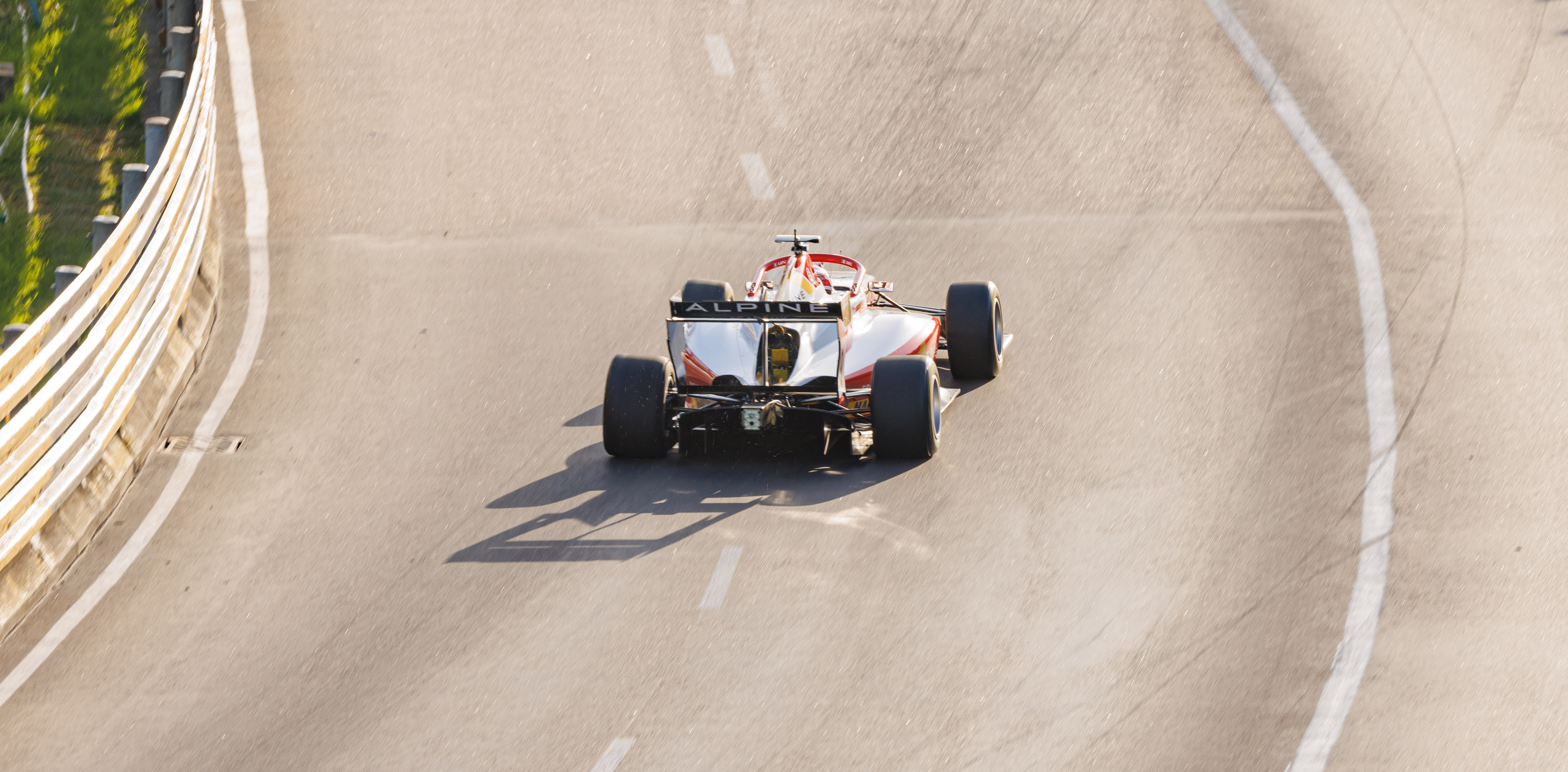
Minì during the 2023 Macau Grand Prix

Minì had a respectable weekend in Silverstone, scoring points in both races with fifth and seventh place. In a tyre wear-intensive sprint in Hungary, Minì overcame Nikita Bedrin, who had initially overtaken him at the start, to win the sprint race. He would drop to 16th place in the feature race. However, Minì failed to score at Spa despite qualifying third; he was involved a collision with Pepe Martí on Saturday for which the Italian received a five-place grid penalty, and not being able to start on Sunday after crashing on the sighting lap. Minì was disqualified from Monza qualifying prompting him to start both races from 26th, but starred in a recovery drive during the sprint race to finish in sixth place. He failed to score points on Sunday, as two time penalties demoted him to 19th. With two poles, two wins, four podiums and 92 points, Minì placed seventh in the standings. Minì also raced in the Macau Grand Prix with Prema. He missed out on pole by 0.006s, in which he stated that he was "a bit sad". He would proceed to finish third in both the qualification and main race.

==== 2024 ====
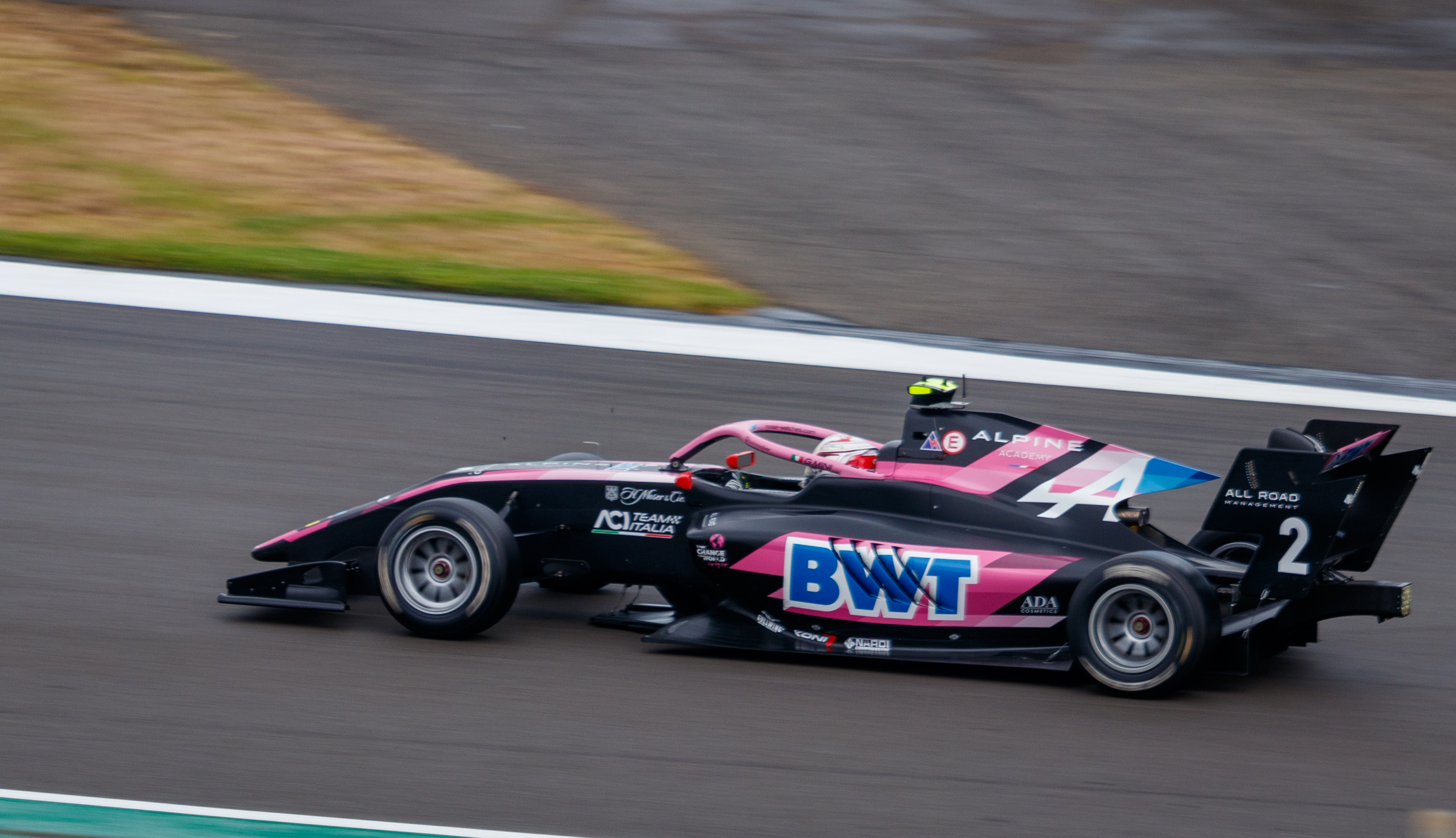
Minì driving for Prema Racing during the 2024 Silverstone Formula 3 round

Minì reunited with Prema Racing for the 2024 season, partnering Dino Beganovic and Arvid Lindblad. Qualifying third for the Bahrain opener, Minì made up positions in the sprint and narrowly missed out on sixth by 0.004 seconds. A slow feature race start dropped Minì to sixth at the chequered flag. Qualifying third again in Melbourne, Following a sixth place in the sprint race, Minì scored his first podium of the year by finishing third in the Australia feature race, with a penultimate lap pass on Luke Browning for the position. Two sixth places in Imola moved him into the championship lead. In Monaco, Minì claimed his first pole of the season. He proceeded to fend off Christian Mansell, helping him to get back-to-back feature race wins in Monaco; in doing so he took the championship lead. At the next round in Barcelona however Minì went pointless, as he retired from the sprint after contact with Sebastián Montoya and dropped positions during the feature. Qualifying fourth in Austria, Amidst many fights, he fought his way back to sixth place in the sprint race. He bounced back with a feature race podium in having come out on top in a bout for second with teammate Beganovic.

Another tough qualifying followed in Silverstone with 14th, After a super start in the sprint race, Minì battled with his fellow Alpine junior Nikola Tsolov, but came up short and finished sixth. A feature race greeted by mixed conditions saw Minì up and down the order, but a late dry spell on slick tyres allowed him to surge up the order and finish in second place. The next round in Hungary became a disappointment, as Minì failed to score points after qualifying 13th. He then finished second behind Beganovic in the Spa-Francorchamps sprint race despite overtaking him on the opening lap. Unfortunately, he missed out on points again on Sunday, having been spun around at the first corner on the opening lap, but still sat one point off championship leader Leonardo Fornaroli heading into the season finale.

Minì qualified third for the Monza finale. Despite earning a grid penalty for the sprint race for driving unnecessarily slowly during qualifying, he managed to finish ninth in the sprint race, meaning that he entered the final feature race three points behind compatriot and championship leader Fornaroli. Though Minì battled past Fornaroli for second in the feature race and the latter dropped to fourth by the final lap, a final-corner overtake by Fornaroli on Christian Mansell allowed him to snatch the title away from Minì by two points. To compound matters, Minì was later disqualified from the race due to his tyre pressures being below the minimum limit. Nevertheless, Minì finished second in the drivers' standings, taking one win, one pole and five podiums as well as 130 points during the season.

=== FIA Formula 2 (2024–) ===
==== 2024 ====
Two weeks following the Formula 3 season finale, Minì would make his Formula 2 debut in Baku for Prema Racing, in place of Oliver Bearman, as the Briton was called to stand in for Haas in Formula One. He finished third in the sprint race despite having led some part of the race early on after passing Christian Mansell. However, he crashed out of the feature race while running in the points with just a handful of laps to go.

==== 2025 ====
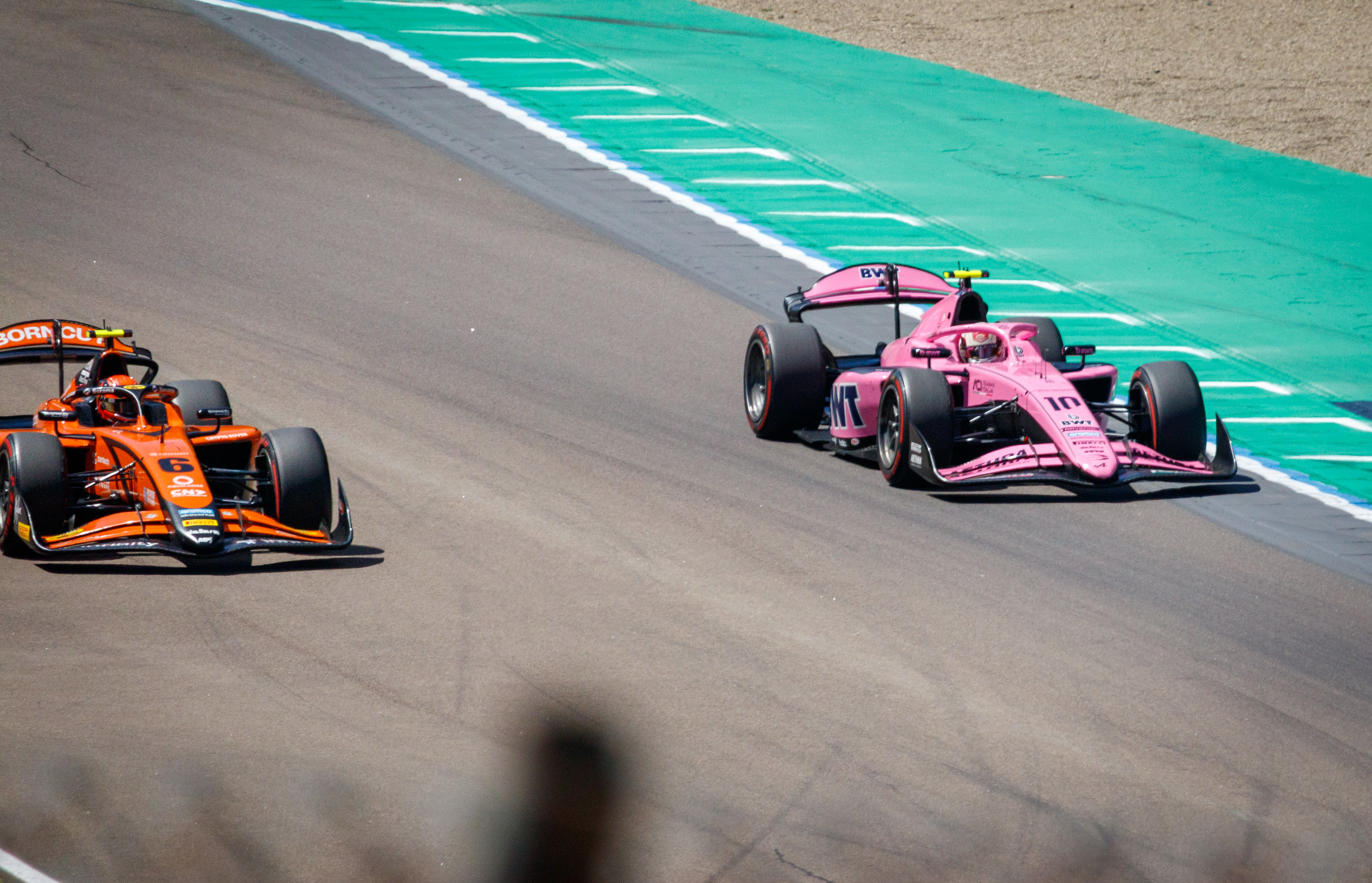
Minì (right) racing in Imola with Richard Verschoor.

Minì made a full step up to Formula 2 in 2025, remaining with Prema Racing where he partners his former Formula 3 teammate Sebastián Montoya. He began the season strongly Melbourne with a maiden pole position, but was demoted three places for both races for impeding. He recovered to seventh in the sprint, though he was unable to capitalise in the feature race, which was cancelled due to wet weather. Minì scored points in both Bahrain and Jeddah, peaking with a sixth place in the latter sprint race. He endured a difficult weekend in Imola, qualifying fifteenth and failing to score points across the round. Nevertheless, he redeemed himself in the Monaco sprint race with a second place, marking his first podium of the season. The next day, he was eliminated on the opening lap of the feature race due to a multi-car collision. In Barcelona, Minì was forced to retire from the sprint following contact with teammate Montoya, but mounted a strong recovery in the feature race, charging from eighteenth to finish tenth using an alternate strategy. He qualified fourth in Austria, though his weekend was compromised by misfortune; he collided with a spinning Amaury Cordeel on the final lap of the sprint, before an engine failure curtailed his feature race on the opening lap.

His challenging run of form continued in Silverstone, where contact with Alex Dunne and Oliver Goethe in the two races left him scoreless. Minì returned to the podium in Spa-Francorchamps with third place in the sprint race after a late overtake on Goethe, and followed this with a sixth-place finish in the feature. He failed to score points at the subsequent round in Hungary. In Monza, Minì secured a pair of seventh-place finishes despite starting fifteenth and sustaining front-end contact with Victor Martins in the feature race. He then achieved a personal-best qualifying result of third in Baku. In the sprint race, Minì ran as high as fourth before an overheating issue in the closing laps dropped him to seventh, while in the feature race he briefly inherited the lead during the pit stop cycle before ultimately finishing fourth. Minì concluded the season in Abu Dhabi with a third place in the feature race from thirteenth. Minì placed thirteenth in the standings with three podiums and 72 points, his worst ever placing in a full-time series.

==== 2026 ====
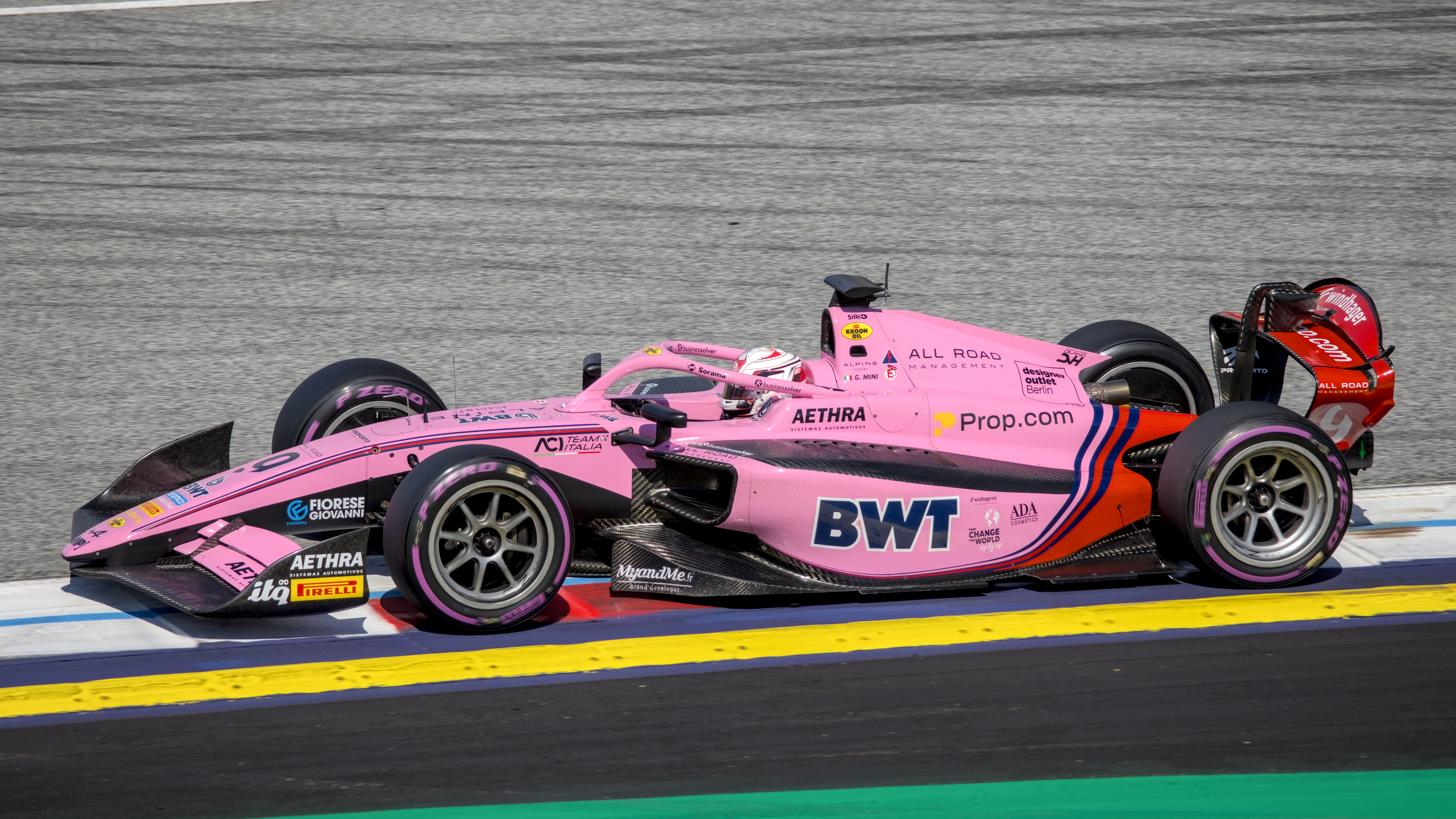
Minì driving the Dallara F2 2024 during the 2026 Spielberg Formula 2 round

Despite initially being tipped to leave the series after just one year, Minì ultimately remained in Formula 2 for 2026, this time moving to MP Motorsport alongside Oliver Goethe. At the feature race at Miami, he secured his maiden victory with a decisive penultimate-lap overtake on Dino Beganovic.

=== Formula One ===
At the start of 2023, Minì was announced to be joining the Alpine Academy.

After completing his maiden Formula One test in July 2026, Minì made his Friday free practice session (FP1) debut at the Mexico City Grand Prix. He had another free practice outing with the team at the São Paulo Grand Prix, placing an impressive seventh.

=== Formula E ===
In May 2024, Minì made his Formula E debut during the rookie test at the Tempelhof Airport Street Circuit, for the Nissan Formula E Team. He returned to Nissan once again in 2025 for the rookie practice sessions in Jeddah and Berlin, topping the timesheets in the latter test. In 2026, Minì made another rookie appearance during the Miami ePrix.

== Karting record ==
=== Karting career summary ===
Season	Series	Team	Position
2013	Trofeo Nazionale — 60 Baby	Minì, Fabrizio	**2nd**
2013	Italian Championship— Formula 60		11th
2013	Italian Regional Championship Sicilia Region — 60 Baby		**1st**
2013	World Cup Trophy — 60 Baby		**1st**
2013	Trofeo Leotta — 60 Baby		**3rd**
2014	Trofeo Nazionale — 60 Baby	Minì, Fabrizio	16th
2014	Italian Regional Championship Sicilia Region — 60 Baby		**1st**
2014	Italian Cup Central Zone — 60 Baby		12th
2014	Italian Cup South Zone — 60 Baby		**1st**
2014	Trofeo Leotta — 60 Mini		**1st**
2015	WSK Champions Cup — 60 Mini	Lenzokart Srl	12th
2015	WSK Super Master Series — 60 Mini	Lenzokart Srl	16th
2015	Trofeo Nazionale — 60 Mini	Giugliano Kart	6th
2015	Italian Championship — 60 Mini		6th
2015	WSK Final Cup — 60 Mini	Giugliano Kart	5th
2016	Italian Championship — 60 Mini		**1st**
2016	WSK Night Edition — 60 Mini		8th
2016	WSK Super Master Series — 60 Mini	Minì, Fabrizio	**3rd**
2016	ROK Cup Italy Area Nord — Mini ROK		51st
2016	ROK Cup International Final — Mini ROK		10th
2017	WSK Champions Cup — 60 Mini	Parolin Racing Kart	**2nd**
2017	Andrea Margutti Trophy — 60 Mini	Parolin Racing Kart	4th
2017	Italian Championship — 60 Mini	Parolin Racing Kart	**1st**
2017	Trofeo delle Industrie — OKJ	Parolin Racing Kart	12th
2017	WSK Super Master Series — 60 Mini	Parolin Racing Kart	**1st**
2017	WSK Final Cup — OKJ	Parolin Racing Kart	19th
2017	SKUSA SuperNationals — X30 Junior	Russell Karting Specialties	7th
2018	WSK Champions Cup — OKJ	Parolin Racing Kart	6th
2018	WSK Super Master Series — OKJ	Parolin Racing Kart	**1st**
2018	SKUSA SuperNationals — X30 Junior	Parolin Racing Kart	30th
2018	CIK-FIA European Championship — OKJ	Parolin Racing Kart	**2nd**
2018	CIK-FIA World Championship — OKJ	Parolin Racing Kart	**2nd**
2018	WSK Final Cup — OKJ	Parolin Racing Kart	**2nd**
2019	WSK Champions Cup — OK	Parolin Racing Kart	**2nd**
2019	South Garda Winter Cup — OK	Parolin Racing Kart	DNF
2019	WSK Euro Series — OK	Parolin Racing Kart	4th
2019	CIK-FIA European Championship — OK	Parolin Racing Kart	**2nd**
2019	CIK-FIA World Championship — OK	Parolin Racing Kart	8th
2019	WSK Super Master Series — OK	Parolin Racing Kart	5th

=== Complete CIK-FIA Karting European Championship results ===
(key) (Races in bold indicate pole position) (Races in italics indicate fastest lap)

Year	Team	Class	1	2	3	4	5	6	7	8	DC	Points
2018	Parolin Racing Kart Srl	OKJ	SAR; QH (9)	SAR; R 2	PFI; QH; 4	PFI; R 3	AMP; QH; 5	AMP; R (14)	AUB; QH; 5	AUB; R 1	2nd	80
2019	Parolin Racing Kart Srl	OK	ANG; QH; 3	ANG; R 3	GEN; QH; 13	GEN; R (5)	KRI; QH; 3	KRI; R 2	LEM; QH; 4	LEM; R 1	2nd	84

== Racing record ==
=== Racing career summary ===
Season	Series	Team	Races	Wins	Poles	F/Laps	Podiums	Points	Position
2020	Italian F4 Championship	Prema Powerteam	20	4	9	2	12	284	**1st**
2020	ADAC Formula 4 Championship	Prema Powerteam	6	1	2	2	4	82	10th
2021	Formula Regional European Championship	ART Grand Prix	20	0	0	0	4	122	7th
2022	Formula Regional Asian Championship	Hitech Grand Prix	12	2	1	1	4	130	4th
2022	Formula Regional European Championship	ART Grand Prix	20	3	3	5	9	242	**2nd**
2023	Formula Regional Middle East Championship	Hitech Grand Prix	6	0	1	0	0	10	22nd
2023	FIA Formula 3 Championship	Hitech Pulse-Eight	18	2	2	1	4	92	7th
2023	Macau Grand Prix	SJM Theodore Prema Racing	1	0	0	0	1	N/A	**3rd**
2024	FIA Formula 3 Championship	Prema Racing	20	1	1	1	5	130	**2nd**
2024	FIA Formula 2 Championship	Prema Racing	2	0	0	0	1	6	27th
2025	FIA Formula 2 Championship	Prema Racing	27	0	0	3	3	72	13th
2026	FIA Formula 2 Championship	MP Motorsport	25	2	0	0	9	163*	4th*
2026	Formula One	BWT Alpine F1 Team	Test driver						

* Season still in progress.

=== Complete Italian F4 Championship results ===
(key) (Races in bold indicate pole position) (Races in italics indicate fastest lap)

Year	Team	1	2	3	4	5	6	7	8	9	10	11	12	13	14	15	16	17	18	19	20	21	Pos	Points
2020	Prema Powerteam	**MIS**; **1**; 1	**MIS**; **2**; 4	**MIS**; **3**; 2	IMO1; 1; 7	IMO1; 2; 5	IMO1; 3; 4	RBR; 1; 2	**RBR**; **2**; 3	**RBR**; **3**; 1	MUG; 1; 4	MUG; 2; 2	MUG; 3; 1	MNZ; 1; 10	MNZ; 2; 2	**MNZ**; **3** Ret	**IMO2**; **1**; 1	IMO2; 2; 2	**IMO2**; **3**; 2	**VLL**; **1**; 7	VLL; 2 C	VLL; 3; 3	1st	284

=== Complete ADAC Formula 4 Championship results ===
(key) (Races in bold indicate pole position) (Races in italics indicate fastest lap)

Year	Team	1	2	3	4	5	6	7	8	9	10	11	12	13	14	15	16	17	18	19	20	21	Pos	Points
2020	Prema Powerteam	LAU1; 1	LAU1; 2	LAU1; 3	**NÜR1**; **1**; 1	NÜR1; 2; 3	NÜR1; 3; 3	HOC; 1 Ret	**HOC**; **2**; 3	HOC; 3; 4	NÜR2; 1	NÜR2; 2	NÜR2; 3	RBR; 1	RBR; 2	RBR; 3	LAU2; 1	LAU2; 2	LAU2; 3	OSC; 1	OSC; 2	OSC; 3	10th	82

=== Complete Formula Regional European Championship results ===
(key) (Races in bold indicate pole position) (Races in italics indicate fastest lap)

Year	Team	1	2	3	4	5	6	7	8	9	10	11	12	13	14	15	16	17	18	19	20	DC	Points
2021	ART Grand Prix	IMO; 1; 11	IMO; 2; 6	CAT; 1; 2	CAT; 2; 5	MCO; 1; 10	MCO; 2; 10	LEC; 1; 3	LEC; 2 Ret	ZAN; 1; 2	ZAN; 2; 3	SPA; 1; 6	SPA; 2; 4	RBR; 1; 11	RBR; 2; 12	VAL; 1; 14	VAL; 2; 10	MUG; 1; 9	MUG; 2 Ret	MNZ; 1 Ret	MNZ; 2; 5	7th	122
2022	ART Grand Prix	MNZ; 1; 15	MNZ; 2; 3	**IMO**; **1**; 28	**IMO**; **2**; 1	MCO; 1; 4	MCO; 2; 3	LEC; 1; 5	**LEC**; **2**; 1	ZAN; 1; 3	ZAN; 2; 2	HUN; 1; 2	HUN; 2; 2	SPA; 1 DSQ	SPA; 2; 6	RBR; 1; 7	RBR; 2; 4	CAT; 1; 5	CAT; 2; 7	MUG; 1 Ret	MUG; 2; 1	2nd	242

=== Complete Formula Regional Asian Championship results ===
(key) (Races in bold indicate pole position) (Races in italics indicate the fastest lap of top ten finishers)

Year	Entrant	1	2	3	4	5	6	7	8	9	10	11	12	13	14	15	DC	Points
2022	Hitech Grand Prix	ABU; 1; 2	ABU; 2 Ret	**ABU**; **3**; 1	DUB; 1 Ret	DUB; 2; 13	DUB; 3; 4	DUB; 1	DUB; 2	DUB; 3	DUB; 1; 5	DUB; 2; 7	DUB; 3; 4	ABU; 1; 8	ABU; 2; 1	ABU; 3; 2	4th	130

=== Complete Formula Regional Middle East Championship results ===
(key) (Races in bold indicate pole position) (Races in italics indicate fastest lap)

Year	Entrant	1	2	3	4	5	6	7	8	9	10	11	12	13	14	15	DC	Points
2023	Hitech Grand Prix	**DUB1**; **1**; 11	DUB1; 2; 21	DUB1; 3; 5	KUW1; 1 Ret	KUW1; 2 Ret	KUW1; 3; 19	KUW2; 1	KUW2; 2	KUW2; 3	DUB2; 1	DUB2; 2	DUB2; 3	ABU; 1	ABU; 2	ABU; 3	22nd	10

=== Complete Macau Grand Prix results ===
Year	Team	Car	Qualifying	Quali Race	Main race
2023	(Hong Kong) SJM Theodore Prema Racing	Dallara F3 2019	2nd	3rd	**3rd**

=== Complete FIA Formula 3 Championship results ===
(key) (Races in bold indicate pole position) (Races in italics indicate fastest lap)

Year	Entrant	1	2	3	4	5	6	7	8	9	10	11	12	13	14	15	16	17	18	19	20	DC	Points
2023	Hitech Pulse-Eight	BHR; SPR; 17	**BHR**; **FEA**; 8	MEL; SPR; 4	MEL; FEA; 3	MON; SPR; 11	**MON**; **FEA**; 1	CAT; SPR; 20	CAT; FEA; 14	RBR; SPR; 2	RBR; FEA; Ret	SIL; SPR; 5	SIL; FEA; 7	HUN; SPR; 1	HUN; FEA; 16	SPA; SPR; Ret	SPA; FEA; DNS	MNZ; SPR; 6	MNZ; FEA; 19			7th	92
2024	Prema Racing	BHR; SPR; 7	BHR; FEA; 6	MEL; SPR; 6	MEL; FEA; 3	IMO; SPR; 6	IMO; FEA; 6	MON; SPR; 11	**MON**; **FEA**; 1	CAT; SPR; Ret	CAT; FEA; 21	RBR; SPR; 6	RBR; FEA; 2	SIL; SPR; 6	SIL; FEA; 2	HUN; SPR; 14	HUN; FEA; 11	SPA; SPR; 2	SPA; FEA; 13	MNZ; SPR; 9	MNZ; FEA; DSQ	2nd	130

=== Complete FIA Formula 2 Championship results ===
(key) (Races in bold indicate pole position) (Races in italics indicate fastest lap)

Year	Entrant	1	2	3	4	5	6	7	8	9	10	11	12	13	14	15	16	17	18	19	20	21	22	23	24	25	26	27	28	29	DC	Points
2024	Prema Racing	BHR; SPR	BHR; FEA	JED; SPR	JED; FEA	MEL; SPR	MEL; FEA	IMO; SPR	IMO; FEA	MON; SPR	MON; FEA	CAT; SPR	CAT; FEA	RBR; SPR	RBR; FEA	SIL; SPR	SIL; FEA	HUN; SPR	HUN; FEA	SPA; SPR	SPA; FEA	MNZ; SPR	MNZ; FEA	BAK; SPR; 3	BAK; FEA; Ret	LSL; SPR	LSL; FEA	YMC; SPR	YMC; FEA		27th	6
2025	Prema Racing	MEL; SPR; 7	MEL; FEA; C	BHR; SPR; 7	BHR; FEA; 9	JED; SPR; 6	JED; FEA; 9	IMO; SPR; 15	IMO; FEA; 18	MON; SPR; 2	MON; FEA; Ret	CAT; SPR; Ret	CAT; FEA; 10	RBR; SPR; 14†	RBR; FEA; Ret	SIL; SPR; 14	SIL; FEA; Ret	SPA; SPR; 3	SPA; FEA; 6	HUN; SPR; 14	HUN; FEA; 17	MNZ; SPR; 7	MNZ; FEA; 7	BAK; SPR; 7	BAK; FEA; 4	LSL; SPR; 12	LSL; FEA; 13	YMC; SPR; 9	YMC; FEA; 3		13th	72
2026	MP Motorsport	MEL; SPR; 6	MEL; FEA; 8	MIA; SPR; 7	MIA; FEA; 1	MTL; SPR; 2	MTL; FEA; 3	MON; SPR; 3	MON; FEA; 11	CAT; SPR; 2	CAT; FEA; 3	RBR; SPR; 5	RBR; FEA; 2	SIL; SPR; 2	SIL; FEA; 6	SPA; SPR; Ret	SPA; FEA; 5	HUN; SPR; 1	HUN; FEA; 9	MNZ; SPR; 10	MNZ; FEA; 11	MAD; SPR; 9	MAD; FEA; 7	BAK; SPR; 14	BAK; FEA1; 6	BAK; FEA2; 9	LSL; SPR	LSL; FEA	YMC; SPR	YMC; FEA	4th*	163*

* Season still in progress.

=== Complete Formula One participations ===
(key) (Races in bold indicate pole position) (Races in italics indicate fastest lap)

Year	Entrant	Chassis	Engine	1	2	3	4	5	6	7	8	9	10	11	12	13	14	15	16	17	18	19	20	21	22	23	WDC	Points
2026	BWT Alpine F1 Team	Alpine A526	Mercedes-AMG M17 E Performance 1.6 V6 t	AUS	CHN	JPN	MIA	CAN	MON	BCN	AUT	GBR	BEL	HUN	NED	ITA	ESP	AZE	BHR	SIN	USA	MXC; TD	SAP; TD	LVG	QAT	ABU	–	–

Sporting positions
Preceded by Dennis Hauger	Italian F4 Championship; Champion; 2020	Succeeded by Oliver Bearman
Preceded by Paul Aron	Italian F4 Championship; Rookie Champion; 2020	Succeeded by Nikita Bedrin
Awards
Preceded by Harry Thompson	FIA Karting; Rookie of the Year; 2019	Succeeded by Andrea Kimi Antonelli
