= Nicolas Todt =

French sports agent (born 1977)

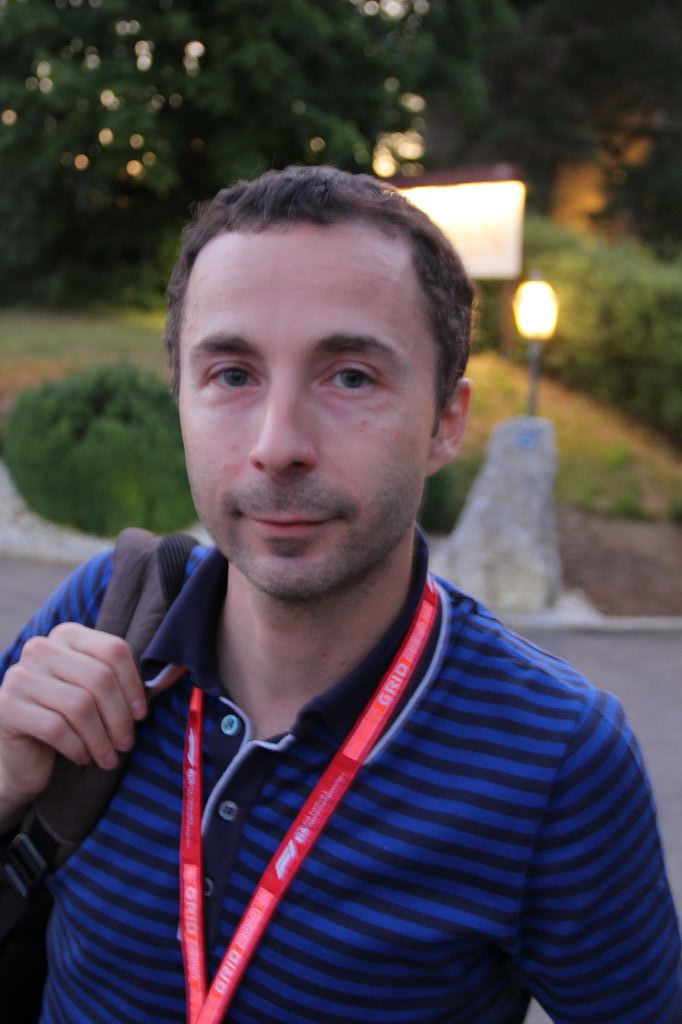
- Todt in 2019
- Born: Nicolas Emmanuel Todt; 17 November 1977 (age 48); Le Chesnay, Yvelines, France
- Education: Toulouse Business School (M.A.)
- Occupations: Motorsport team owner; racing driver manager
- Spouse: Darina Todt
- Children: 1
- Parent: Jean Todt (father)
- Relatives: Michelle Yeoh (stepmother)

Nicolas Emmanuel Todt (born 17 November 1977) is a French motorsport team owner.

== Personal life and education ==
Todt is the son of former Ferrari Formula One team principal and former FIA president Jean Todt. He is married to Darina and has a son, who was born on 1 January 2024.

Todt holds a Master's degree in Management from the Toulouse Business School.

== Career ==
Todt is the manager of major racing drivers, including Daniil Kvyat, Felipe Massa, Pastor Maldonado, James Calado, Charles Leclerc, José María López, Caio Collet, Marcus Armstrong, Gabriele Minì, James Wharton, Martinius Stenshorne, Noel León, Christian Ho and Christian Costoya. In 2003, Todt founded All Road Management to scout, manage and develop talents able to reach the top in motorsport from karting to F1, through the different single-seater formulas, GT, Endurance as well as new categories such as Formula E. Until the end of 2018, he was the co-owner of the motorsport team ART Grand Prix.

Todt is seen as being very influential in Massa's move from Sauber to Ferrari. There were rumours in mid-2007 that Todt could take over Scuderia Toro Rosso Formula One team, which Toro Rosso team owner Gerhard Berger dismissed.
