= 2024 Silverstone Formula 3 round =

Motor racing event

(United Kingdom) 2024 Silverstone Formula 3 round
Round details
- Round 7 of 10 in the 2024 FIA Formula 3 Championship.
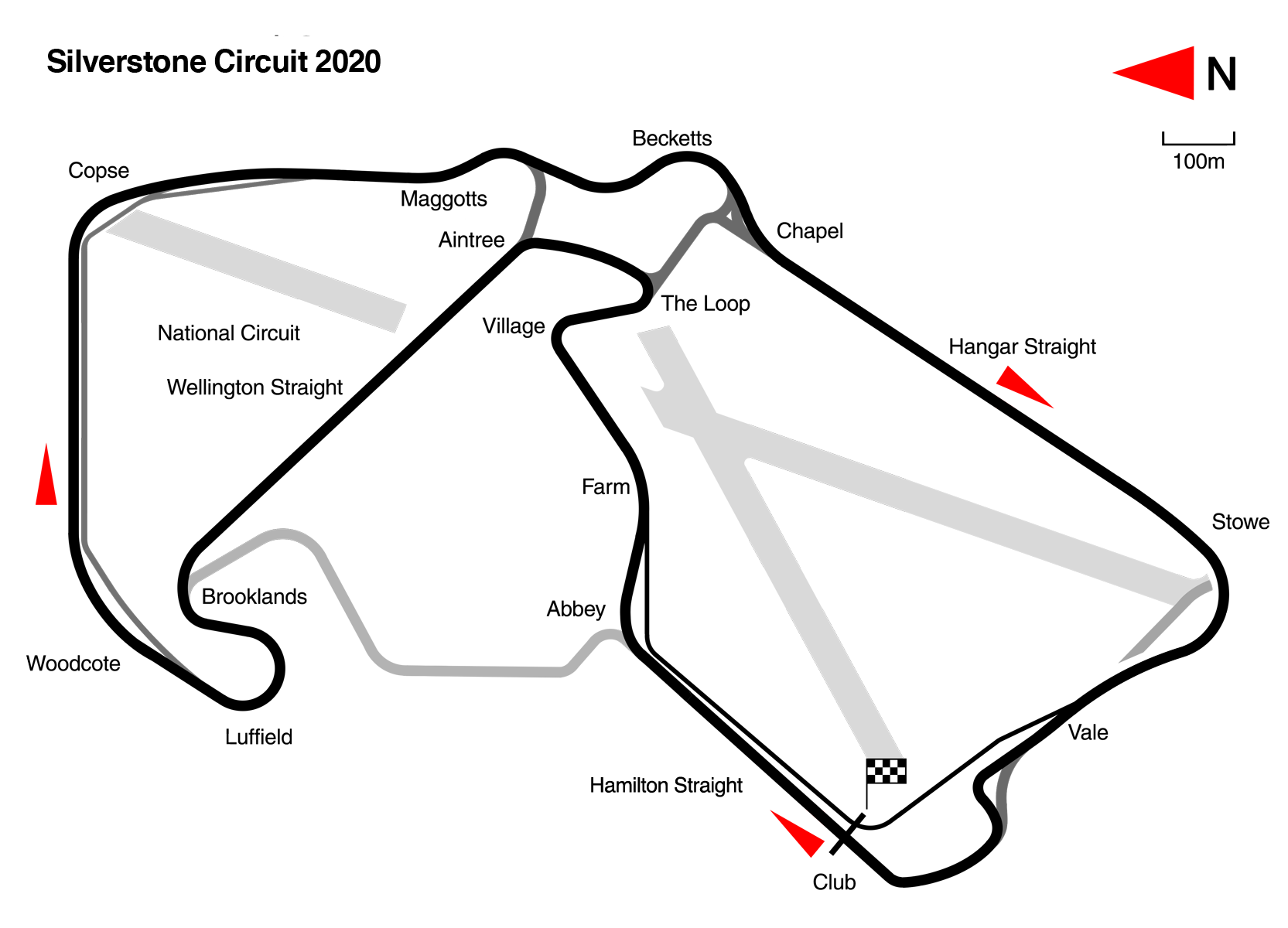
- Location: Silverstone Circuit, Silverstone, United Kingdom
- Course: Permanent racing facility 5.891 km (3.661 mi)

Sprint Race
- Date: 6 July 2024
- Laps: 18
Podium
| First | (United Kingdom) Arvid Lindblad | Prema Racing |
| Second | (Mexico) Noel León | Van Amersfoort Racing |
| Third | (Peru) Matías Zagazeta | Jenzer Motorsport |
Fastest lap
| Driver | (United Kingdom) Arvid Lindblad | Prema Racing |
- Time: 1:47.304 (on lap 8)

Feature Race
- Date: 7 July 2024
- Laps: 22
Pole position
| Driver | (United Kingdom) Luke Browning | Hitech Pulse-Eight |
| Time | 1:44.992 | |
Podium
| First | (United Kingdom) Arvid Lindblad | Prema Racing |
| Second | (Italy) Gabriele Minì | Prema Racing |
| Third | (United Kingdom) Callum Voisin | Rodin Motorsport |
Fastest lap
| Driver | (Italy) Gabriele Minì | Prema Racing |
- Time: 1:47.369 (on lap 18)

The 2024 Silverstone Formula 3 round was a motor racing event held between 5 and 7 July at the Silverstone Circuit, Silverstone, United Kingdom. It was the seventh round of the 2024 FIA Formula 3 Championship and was held in support of the 2024 British Grand Prix.

With Arvid Lindblad winning the Sprint and Feature Race, it was the first time since Jack Doohan's 2021 Spa-Francorchamps Formula 3 round that a driver was able to win two races in one weekend.

== Background ==
=== Driver changes ===
Hitech Pulse-Eight driver Martinius Stenshorne received a suspension from the seventh round at Silverstone Circuit. He had competed in the Silverstone round of the GB3 Championship in April without prior FIA approval and was judged to have gained an illegal sporting advantage. FRECA driver James Wharton replaced him for this round.

== Classification ==
=== Qualifying ===
Qualifying was held on 5 July 2024, at 14:05 local time (UTC+1).

| Pos. | No. | Driver | Team | Time/Gap | Grid SR | Grid FR |
|---|---|---|---|---|---|---|
| 1 | 14 | (United Kingdom) Luke Browning | Hitech Pulse-Eight | 1:44.992 | 12 | 1 |
| 2 | 18 | (United States) Max Esterson | Jenzer Motorsport | +0.045 | 11 | 2 |
| 3 | 5 | (France) Sami Meguetounif | Trident | +0.092 | 10 | 3 |
| 4 | 4 | (Italy) Leonardo Fornaroli | Trident | +0.273 | 9 | 4 |
| 5 | 24 | (Netherlands) Laurens van Hoepen | ART Grand Prix | +0.294 | 8 | 5 |
| 6 | 17 | (Austria) Charlie Wurz | Jenzer Motorsport | +0.320 | 7 | 6 |
| 7 | 23 | (Australia) Christian Mansell | ART Grand Prix | +0.382 | 6 | 7 |
| 8 | 25 | (Bulgaria) Nikola Tsolov | ART Grand Prix | +0.402 | 5 | 8 |
| 9 | 29 | (United Kingdom) Callum Voisin | Rodin Motorsport | +0.405 | 4 | 9 |
| 10 | 19 | (Peru) Matías Zagazeta | Jenzer Motorsport | +0.413 | 3 | 10 |
| 11 | 3 | (United Kingdom) Arvid Lindblad | Prema Racing | +0.434 | 2 | 11 |
| 12 | 20 | (Mexico) Noel León | Van Amersfoort Racing | +0.483 | 1 | 12 |
| 13 | 9 | (Republic of Ireland) Alex Dunne | MP Motorsport | +0.553 | 13 | 13 |
| 14 | 2 | (Italy) Gabriele Minì | Prema Racing | +0.570 | 14 | 14 |
| 15 | 10 | (Germany) Oliver Goethe | Campos Racing | +0.636 | 15 | 15 |
| 16 | 31 | (United Kingdom) Joseph Loake | Rodin Motorsport | +0.787 | 16 | 16 |
| 17 | 11 | (Colombia) Sebastián Montoya | Campos Racing | +0.792 | 17 | 17 |
| 18 | 6 | (Mexico) Santiago Ramos | Trident | +0.817 | 18 | 18 |
| 19 | 1 | (Sweden) Dino Beganovic | Prema Racing | +0.826 | 19 | 19 |
| 20 | 8 | (Poland) Kacper Sztuka | MP Motorsport | +1.040 | 20 | 20 |
| 21 | 7 | (Germany) Tim Tramnitz | MP Motorsport | +1.192 | 21 | 21 |
| 22 | 12 | (Spain) Mari Boya | Campos Racing | +1.437 | 22 | 22 |
| 23 | 16 | (United Kingdom) Cian Shields | Hitech Pulse-Eight | +1.485 | 23 | 23 |
| 24 | 4 | (Italy) Nikita Bedrin (Note: Bedrin is a Russian driver competing under an Italian licence.) | AIX Racing | +1.503 | 24 | 24 |
| 25 | 21 | (Germany) Sophia Flörsch | Van Amersfoort Racing | +1.592 | 25 | 25 |
| 26 | 22 | (Australia) Tommy Smith | Van Amersfoort Racing | +1.627 | 26 | 26 |
| 27 | 15 | (Australia) James Wharton | Hitech Pulse-Eight | +1.781 | 27 | 27 |
| 28 | 26 | (Thailand) Tasanapol Inthraphuvasak | AIX Racing | +1.872 | 28 | 28 |
| 29 | 28 | (Austria) Joshua Dufek | AIX Racing | +1.981 | 29 | 29 |
| 30 | 30 | (Poland) Piotr Wiśnicki | Rodin Motorsport | +2.878 | 30 | 30 |
107% time: 1:52.341 (+7.349)

=== Sprint race ===
The Sprint race was held on 6 July 2024. It was initially scheduled to be held at 09:20 local time (UTC+1), but was postponed after multiple delays due to weather conditions. It was then announced that the Sprint race will be rescheduled and held at 18:00 local time (UTC+1).

| Pos. | No. | Driver | Team | Laps | Time/Gap | Grid | Pts. |
|---|---|---|---|---|---|---|---|
| 1 | 3 | (United Kingdom) Arvid Lindblad | Prema Racing | 18 | 36:32.184 | 2 | 10 (1) |
| 2 | 20 | (Mexico) Noel León | Hitech Pulse-Eight | 18 | +6.550 | 1 | 9 |
| 3 | 19 | (Peru) Matías Zagazeta | Jenzer Motorsport | 18 | +8.447 | 3 | 8 |
| 4 | 29 | (United Kingdom) Callum Voisin | Rodin Motorsport | 18 | +9.409 | 4 | 7 |
| 5 | 25 | (Bulgaria) Nikola Tsolov | ART Grand Prix | 18 | +11.332 | 8^{1} | 6 |
| 6 | 2 | (Italy) Gabriele Minì | Prema Racing | 18 | +11.453 | 12 | 5 |
| 7 | 11 | (Colombia) Sebastián Montoya | Campos Racing | 18 | +11.715 | 17 | 4 |
| 8 | 5 | (France) Sami Meguetounif | Trident | 18 | +11.946 | 13^{1} | 3 |
| 9 | 24 | (Netherlands) Laurens van Hoepen | ART Grand Prix | 18 | +12.139 | 7 | 2 |
| 10 | 4 | (Italy) Leonardo Fornaroli | Trident | 18 | +12.646 | 9 | 1 |
| 11 | 23 | (Australia) Christian Mansell | ART Grand Prix | 18 | +15.885 | 5 | |
| 12 | 1 | (Sweden) Dino Beganovic | Prema Racing | 18 | +17.511 | 19 | |
| 13 | 27 | (Italy) Nikita Bedrin | AIX Racing | 18 | +21.697 | 23 | |
| 14 | 30 | (Poland) Piotr Wiśnicki | Rodin Motorsport | 18 | +22.048 | 30 | |
| 15 | 31 | (United Kingdom) Joseph Loake | Rodin Motorsport | 18 | +22.743 | 16 | |
| 16 | 12 | (Spain) Mari Boya | Campos Racing | 18 | +23.205 | 25^{1} | |
| 17 | 16 | (United Kingdom) Cian Shields | Hitech Pulse-Eight | 18 | +23.727 | 22 | |
| 18 | 15 | (Australia) James Wharton | Hitech Pulse-Eight | 18 | +30.851^{2} | 27 | |
| 19 | 6 | (Mexico) Santiago Ramos | Trident | 18 | +35.240 | 18 | |
| 20 | 26 | (Thailand) Tasanapol Inthraphuvasak | AIX Racing | 18 | +36.010 | 28 | |
| 21 | 22 | (Australia) Tommy Smith | Van Amersfoort Racing | 18 | +49.151 | 26 | |
| 22 | 9 | (Republic of Ireland) Alex Dunne | MP Motorsport | 18 | +1:14.050 | 11 | |
| 23 | 28 | (Austria) Joshua Dufek | AIX Racing | 18 | +1 lap | 29 | |
| 24 | 14 | (United Kingdom) Luke Browning | Hitech Pulse-Eight | 18 | +1 lap | 10 | |
| 25 | 7 | (Germany) Tim Tramnitz | MP Motorsport | 18 | +1 lap | 21 | |
| DNF | 17 | (Austria) Charlie Wurz | Jenzer Motorsport | 11 | Collision damage | 6 | |
| DNF | 8 | (Poland) Kacper Sztuka | MP Motorsport | 6 | Driveshaft | 20 | |
| DNF | 18 | (United States) Max Esterson | Jenzer Motorsport | 3 | Collision | 14^{1} | |
| DNF | 10 | (Germany) Oliver Goethe | Campos Racing | 3 | Collision | 15 | |
| DNF | 21 | (Germany) Sophia Flörsch | Van Amersfoort Racing | 2 | Collision damage | 24 | |
Fastest lap set by (United Kingdom) Arvid Lindblad: 1:47.304 (lap 8)

Notes:

- ^1 – Nikola Tsolov, Sami Meguetounif, Mari Boya and Max Esterson all received grid penalties post-qualifying for impeding several drivers.
- ^2 – James Wharton originally finished thirteenth, but was later given a ten-second time penalty for causing a collision with Tommy Smith, demoting him to P18 in the final classification.

=== Feature Race ===
The Feature race was held on 7 July 2024, at 08:20 local time (UTC+1).

| Pos. | No. | Driver | Team | Laps | Time/Gap | Grid | Pts. |
|---|---|---|---|---|---|---|---|
| 1 | 3 | (United Kingdom) Arvid Lindblad | Prema Racing | 20 | 47:12.061 | 10 | 25 |
| 2 | 2 | (Italy) Gabriele Minì | Prema Racing | 20 | +0.874 | 14 | 18 (1) |
| 3 | 29 | (United Kingdom) Callum Voisin | Rodin Motorsport | 20 | +9.213^{1} | 8 | 15 |
| 4 | 22 | (Australia) Tommy Smith | Van Amersfoort Racing | 20 | +19.567 | 26 | 12 |
| 5 | 30 | (Poland) Piotr Wiśnicki | Rodin Motorsport | 20 | +42.258 | 30 | 10 |
| 6 | 10 | (Germany) Oliver Goethe | Campos Racing | 20 | +46.081 | 20^{2} | 8 |
| 7 | 4 | (Italy) Leonardo Fornaroli | Trident | 20 | +1:00.404 | 4 | 6 |
| 8 | 14 | (United Kingdom) Luke Browning | Hitech Pulse-Eight | 20 | +1:03.259 | 1 | 4 (2) |
| 9 | 27 | (Italy) Nikita Bedrin | AIX Racing | 20 | +1:05.449 | 24 | 2 |
| 10 | 20 | (Mexico) Noel León | Van Amersfoort Racing | 20 | +1:08.179 | 12 | 1 |
| 11 | 24 | (Netherlands) Laurens van Hoepen | ART Grand Prix | 20 | +1:13.024 | 5 | |
| 12 | 5 | (France) Sami Meguetounif | Trident | 20 | +1:13.436 | 3 | |
| 13 | 23 | (Australia) Christian Mansell | ART Grand Prix | 20 | +1:13.644 | 6 | |
| 14 | 7 | (Germany) Tim Tramnitz | MP Motorsport | 20 | +1:16.560 | 21 | |
| 15 | 25 | (Bulgaria) Nikola Tsolov | ART Grand Prix | 20 | +1:16.840 | 7 | |
| 16 | 6 | (Mexico) Santiago Ramos | Trident | 20 | +1:20.201 | 17 | |
| 17 | 8 | (Poland) Kacper Sztuka | MP Motorsport | 20 | +1:21.468 | 19 | |
| 18 | 18 | (United States) Max Esterson | Jenzer Motorsport | 20 | +1:23.637 | 2 | |
| 19 | 1 | (Sweden) Dino Beganovic | Prema Racing | 20 | +1:26.013 | 18 | |
| 20 | 26 | (Thailand) Tasanapol Inthraphuvasak | AIX Raxing | 20 | +1:26.750 | 28 | |
| 21 | 15 | (Australia) James Wharton | Hitech Pulse-Eight | 20 | +1:29.767 | 27 | |
| 22 | 19 | (Peru) Matías Zagazeta | Jenzer Motorsport | 20 | +1:33.964 | 9 | |
| 23 | 12 | (Spain) Mari Boya | Campos Racing | 20 | +1:36.218 | 22 | |
| 24 | 31 | (United Kingdom) Joseph Loake | Rodin Motorsport | 19 | +1 lap | 15 | |
| DNF | 17 | (Austria) Charlie Wurz | Jenzer Motorsport | 15 | Retired | 11^{2} | |
| DNF | 28 | (Austria) Joshua Dufek | AIX Racing | 8 | Collision damage | 29 | |
| DNF | 11 | (Colombia) Sebastián Montoya | Campos Racing | 7 | Collision | 16 | |
| DNF | 9 | (Republic of Ireland) Alex Dunne | MP Motorsport | 7 | Collision | 13 | |
| DNF | 21 | (Germany) Sophia Flörsch | Van Amersfoort Racing | 3 | Collision | 25 | |
| DNF | 16 | (United Kingdom) Cian Shields | Hitech Pulse-Eight | 0 | Collision damage | 23 | |
Fastest lap set by (Italy) Gabriele Minì: 1:47.369 (lap 18)

Notes:

- ^1 – Callum Voisin originally won the race, but he received a ten-second time-penalty for overtaking off the track and gaining an advantage. As a result, Arvid Lindblad inherited the win.
- ^2 – Oliver Goethe and Charlie Wurz both received ten-second time penalties after the Sprint race, which were converted into a grid drop of five places for causing collisions.

== Standings after the event ==
Drivers' Championship standings

| | Pos. | Driver | Points |
|---|---|---|---|
| 1 | 1 | (Italy) Gabriele Minì | 119 |
| 4 | 2 | (United Kingdom) Arvid Lindblad | 113 |
| 2 | 3 | (United Kingdom) Luke Browning | 112 |
| 1 | 4 | (Italy) Leonardo Fornaroli | 93 |
| 2 | 5 | (Germany) Oliver Goethe | 85 |

Teams' Championship standings

| | Pos. | Team | Points |
|---|---|---|---|
| | 1 | (Italy) Prema Racing | 312 |
| | 2 | (France) ART Grand Prix | 177 |
| | 3 | (Italy) Trident | 153 |
| 1 | 4 | (Spain) Campos Racing | 141 |
| 1 | 5 | (United Kingdom) Hitech Pulse-Eight | 136 |

- Note: Only the top five positions are included for both sets of standings.

== See also ==
- 2024 British Grand Prix
- 2024 Silverstone Formula 2 round

== Notes ==
| Previous round: 2024 Spielberg Formula 3 round | FIA Formula 3 Championship; 2024 season | Next round: 2024 Budapest Formula 3 round |
| Previous round: 2023 Silverstone Formula 3 round | Silverstone Formula 3 round | Next round: 2025 Silverstone Formula 3 round |
