= 2024 Sakhir Formula 3 round =

First round of the 2024 FIA Formula 3 season

(Bahrain) 2024 Sakhir Formula 3 round
Round details
- Round 1 of 10 in the 2024 FIA Formula 3 Championship.
- Layout of the Bahrain International Circuit
- Location: Bahrain International Circuit; Sakhir, Bahrain
- Course: Permanent racing facility 5.412 km (3.363 mi)

Sprint Race
- Date: 1 March 2024
- Laps: 19
Podium
First	(United Kingdom) Arvid Lindblad	Prema Racing
Second	(Netherlands) Laurens van Hoepen	ART Grand Prix
Third	(Italy) Leonardo Fornaroli	Trident
Fastest lap
Driver	(Netherlands) Laurens van Hoepen	ART Grand Prix
- Time: 1:50.401 (on lap 2)

Feature Race
- Date: 2 March 2024
- Laps: 22
Pole position
Driver	(Sweden) Dino Beganovic	Prema Racing
Time	1:46.431	
Podium
First	(United Kingdom) Luke Browning	Hitech Pulse-Eight
Second	(Australia) Christian Mansell	ART Grand Prix
Third	(Germany) Tim Tramnitz	MP Motorsport
Fastest lap
Driver	(Sweden) Dino Beganovic	Prema Racing
- Time: 1:50.261 (on lap 2)

The 2024 Sakhir FIA Formula 3 round was a motor racing event held between 29 February and 2 March 2024 at the Bahrain International Circuit in Sakhir, Bahrain. It was the first race of the 2024 FIA Formula 3 Championship and was being held in support of the 2024 Bahrain Grand Prix.

== Background ==
=== Team changes ===
New Zealand automotive manufacturer Rodin Cars took over Carlin and renamed the team Rodin Motorsport, after previously becoming majority shareholder in 2023.

=== Driver changes ===
The previous season's top five drivers - reigning champion Gabriel Bortoleto, runner-up Zak O'Sullivan, Paul Aron, Franco Colapinto, and Pepe Martí - all left the series and graduated to the FIA Formula 2 Championship. Italian F4 Championship champion and Kacper Sztuka and third-placed Arvid Lindblad debuted in the series with MP Motorsport and Prema Racing, respectively, both as Red Bull Junior Team members, and Formula Regional European Championship runner-up Martinius Stenshorne joined Hitech Pulse-Eight. Thai Tasanapol Inthraphuvasak, Peruvian Matías Zagazeta, and Alex Dunne of Ireland became the first drivers to represent their respective nations in series history.

== Classification ==
=== Summary ===
Dino Beganovic set the fastest qualifying time for the opening round at Bahrain International Circuit to claim feature race pole position, followed by Luke Browning and Gabriele Minì. Laurens van Hoepen qualified twelfth and thus started the reverse-grid sprint race from first place. His ART Grand Prix teammate Nikola Tsolov took the lead at the first corner, and the two drivers continued competing for first position for much of the race. Arvid Lindblad, who started fourth, took advantage of the battle in front and overtook both drivers to claim the lead, and later the race win, on his FIA Formula 3 debut. He was joined on the podium by Van Hoepen, also on his debut race, and Leonardo Fornaroli, who had passed Tsolov in the closing laps.

Pole-sitter Beganovic encountered an issue off the start line in the feature race and was overtaken by the entire field before the first corner. The lead therefore passed to Browning, with Sami Meguetounif and Tim Tramnitz improving to the podium positions. Eighth-place starter Christian Mansell made overtakes at the start and had claimed second place by lap five. Mansell ran close behind Browning for most of the race but was unable to pass, and Browning took his first FIA Formula 3 victory, with Tramnitz completing the podium on his debut weekend. At the conclusion of the round, Browning led the Drivers' Championship by four points over Tramnitz.

=== Qualifying ===
Qualifying was held on 29 February 2024, at 16:00 local time (UTC+3).

Pos.	No.	Driver	Entrant	Time/Gap	Grid SR	Grid FR
1	1	(Sweden) Dino Beganovic	Prema Racing	1:46.431	12	1
2	14	(United Kingdom) Luke Browning	Hitech Pulse-Eight	+0.167	11	2
3	2	(Italy) Gabriele Minì	Prema Racing	+0.170	10	3
4	5	(France) Sami Meguetounif	Trident	+0.364	9	4
5	6	(Mexico) Santiago Ramos	Trident	+0.367	8	5
6	4	(Italy) Leonardo Fornaroli	Trident	+0.374	7	6
7	7	(Germany) Tim Tramnitz	MP Motorsport	+0.397	6	7
8	23	(Australia) Christian Mansell	ART Grand Prix	+0.412	5	8
9	3	(United Kingdom) Arvid Lindblad	Prema Racing	+0.442	4	9
10	18	(United States) Max Esterson	Jenzer Motorsport	+0.503	3	10
11	25	(Bulgaria) Nikola Tsolov	ART Grand Prix	+0.510	2	11
12	24	(Netherlands) Laurens van Hoepen	ART Grand Prix	+0.531	1	12
13	20	(Mexico) Noel León	Van Amersfoort Racing	+0.600	13	13
14	9	(Republic of Ireland) Alex Dunne	MP Motorsport	+0.702	14	14
15	12	(Spain) Mari Boya	Campos Racing	+0.739	15	15
16	17	(Austria) Charlie Wurz	Jenzer Motorsport	+0.760	16	16
17	10	(Germany) Oliver Goethe	Campos Racing	+0.767	17	17
18	27	(Italy) Nikita Bedrin (Note: Bedrin is a Russian driver competing under an Italian licence.)	PHM AIX Racing	+0.778	18	18
19	29	(United Kingdom) Callum Voisin	Rodin Motorsport	+0.785	19	19
20	19	(Peru) Matías Zagazeta	Jenzer Motorsport	+0.786	20	25^{1}
21	31	(United Kingdom) Joseph Loake	Rodin Motorsport	+0.788	21	20
22	15	(Norway) Martinius Stenshorne	Hitech Pulse-Eight	+1.040	22	21
23	26	(Thailand) Tasanapol Inthraphuvasak	PHM AIX Racing	+1.304	23	22
24	8	(Poland) Kacper Sztuka	MP Motorsport	+1.314	24	23
25	21	(Germany) Sophia Flörsch	Van Amersfoort Racing	+1.381	25	24
26	28	(Austria) Joshua Dufek	PHM AIX Racing	+1.447	26	26
27	22	(Australia) Tommy Smith	Van Amersfoort Racing	+1.498	27	27
28	30	(Poland) Piotr Wiśnicki	Rodin Motorsport	+1.540	28	28
29	11	(Colombia) Sebastián Montoya	Campos Racing	+1.927	29	29
30	16	(United Kingdom) Cian Shields	Hitech Pulse-Eight	+2.134	30	30
107% time: 1:53.881 (+7.450)

Notes:

- ^1 – Matías Zagazeta received a five-place grid penalty for the Feature Race for causing a collision with Tommy Smith in the Sprint Race.

=== Sprint race ===
The sprint race was held on 1 March 2024, at 13:15 local time (UTC+3).

Pos.	No.	Driver	Team	Laps	Time/Gap	Grid	Pts.
1	3	(United Kingdom) Arvid Lindblad	Prema Racing	19	35:35.482	4	10
2	24	(Netherlands) Laurens van Hoepen	ART Grand Prix	19	+5.478	1	9 (1)
3	4	(Italy) Leonardo Fornaroli	Trident	19	+5.514	7	8
4	25	(Bulgaria) Nikola Tsolov	ART Grand Prix	19	+6.717	2	7
5	7	(Germany) Tim Tramnitz	MP Motorsport	19	+6.927	6	6
6	18	(United States) Max Esterson	Jenzer Motorsport	19	+8.409	3	5
7	2	(Italy) Gabriele Minì	Prema Racing	19	+8.413	10	4
8	12	(Spain) Mari Boya	Campos Racing	19	+9.183	15	3
9	10	(Germany) Oliver Goethe	Campos Racing	19	+9.938	17	2
10	5	(France) Sami Meguetounif	Trident	19	+11.245	9	1
11	15	(Norway) Martinius Stenshorne	Hitech Pulse-Eight	19	+12.585	22	
12	9	(Republic of Ireland) Alex Dunne	MP Motorsport	19	+13.082	14	
13	27	(Italy) Nikita Bedrin	PHM AIX Racing	19	+14.987	18	
14	23	(Australia) Christian Mansell	ART Grand Prix	19	+19.282	5	
15	14	(United Kingdom) Luke Browning	Hitech Pulse-Eight	19	+19.513	11	
16	26	(Thailand) Tasanapol Inthraphuvasak	PHM AIX Racing	19	+19.756	23	
17	29	(United Kingdom) Callum Voisin	Rodin Motorsport	19	+21.166	19	
18	11	(Colombia) Sebastián Montoya	Campos Racing	19	+22.907	29	
19	17	(Austria) Charlie Wurz	Jenzer Motorsport	19	+24.629	16	
20	8	(Poland) Kacper Sztuka	MP Motorsport	19	+26.625	24	
21	6	(Mexico) Santiago Ramos	Trident	19	+27.349	8	
22	20	(Mexico) Noel León	Van Amersfoort Racing	19	+30.135	13	
23	21	(Germany) Sophia Flörsch	Van Amersfoort Racing	19	+33.128	25	
24	28	(Austria) Joshua Dufek	PHM AIX Racing	19	+37.819	26	
25	30	(Poland) Piotr Wiśnicki	Rodin Motorsport	19	+38.205	28	
26	16	(United Kingdom) Cian Shields	Hitech Pulse-Eight	19	+40.079	30	
27	31	(United Kingdom) Joseph Loake	Rodin Motorsport	19	+40.715	21	
28	22	(Australia) Tommy Smith	Van Amersfoort Racing	19	+1:00.473	27	
29	1	(Sweden) Dino Beganovic	Prema Racing	19	+1:30.029	12	
DNF	19	(Peru) Matías Zagazeta	Jenzer Motorsport	15	Collision damage	20	
Fastest lap set by (Netherlands) Laurens van Hoepen: 1:50.401 (lap 2)

=== Feature race ===
The feature race was held on 2 March 2024, at 12:00 local time (UTC+3).

Pos.	No.	Driver	Team	Laps	Time/Gap	Grid	Pts.
1	14	(United Kingdom) Luke Browning	Hitech Pulse-Eight	22	41:08.012	2	25
2	23	(Australia) Christian Mansell	ART Grand Prix	22	+1.264	8	18
3	7	(Germany) Tim Tramnitz	MP Motorsport	22	+2.432	7	15
4	5	(France) Sami Meguetounif	Trident	22	+5.654	4	12
5	6	(Mexico) Santiago Ramos	Trident	22	+6.930	5	10
6	2	(Italy) Gabriele Minì	Prema Racing	22	+8.200	3	8
7	4	(Italy) Leonardo Fornaroli	Trident	22	+8.888	6	6 (1)
8	3	(United Kingdom) Arvid Lindblad	Prema Racing	22	+9.542	9	4
9	9	(Republic of Ireland) Alex Dunne	MP Motorsport	22	+16.619	14	2
10	10	(Germany) Oliver Goethe	Campos Racing	22	+17.032	17	1
11	25	(Bulgaria) Nikola Tsolov	ART Grand Prix	22	+18.076	11	
12	20	(Mexico) Noel León	Van Amersfoort Racing	22	+19.451	13	
13	1	(Sweden) Dino Beganovic	Prema Racing	22	+20.021	1	(2)
14	15	(Norway) Martinius Stenshorne	Hitech Pulse-Eight	22	+21.734	22	
15	24	(Netherlands) Laurens van Hoepen	ART Grand Prix	22	+22.676	12	
16	17	(Austria) Charlie Wurz	Jenzer Motorsport	22	+23.108	16	
17	11	(Colombia) Sebastián Montoya	Campos Racing	22	+23.679	29	
18	19	(Peru) Matías Zagazeta	Jenzer Motorsport	22	+30.847	25	
19	26	(Thailand) Tasanapol Inthraphuvasak	PHM AIX Racing	22	+34.409	22	
20	27	(Italy) Nikita Bedrin	PHM AIX Racing	22	+34.902^{1}	18	
21	29	(United Kingdom) Callum Voisin	Rodin Motorsport	22	+35.839	19	
22	22	(Australia) Tommy Smith	Van Amersfoort Racing	22	+37.465	27	
23	31	(United Kingdom) Joseph Loake	Rodin Motorsport	22	+41.131	20	
24	18	(United States) Max Esterson	Jenzer Motorsport	22	+42.347	10	
25	30	(Poland) Piotr Wiśnicki	Rodin Motorsport	22	+52.341	28	
26	16	(United Kingdom) Cian Shields	Hitech Pulse-Eight	22	+53.921	30	
27	28	(Austria) Joshua Dufek	PHM AIX Racing	22	+59.979	26	
28	8	(Poland) Kacper Sztuka	MP Motorsport	22	+1:03.836	23	
29	12	(Spain) Mari Boya	Campos Racing	22	+1:28.231	15	
30^{2}	21	(Germany) Sophia Flörsch	Van Amersfoort Racing	21	+1 lap	24	
Fastest lap set by (Sweden) Dino Beganovic: 1:50.261 (lap 2)

Notes:

- ^1 – Nikita Bedrin originally finished eighteenth, but was later given a five-second time penalty for exceeding track limits multiple times, dropping him down to 20th place in the final classification.
- ^2 – Sophia Flörsch retired on the final lap, but was classified as she completed over 90% of the race distance.

== Standings after the event ==
Drivers' Championship standings

Pos.	Driver	Points
1	(United Kingdom) Luke Browning	25
2	(Germany) Tim Tramnitz	21
3	(Australia) Christian Mansell	18
4	(Italy) Leonardo Fornaroli	15
5	(United Kingdom) Arvid Lindblad	14

Teams' Championship standings

Pos.	Team	Points
1	(Italy) Trident	38
2	(France) ART Grand Prix	35
3	(Italy) Prema Racing	28
4	(United Kingdom) Hitech Pulse-Eight	25
5	(Netherlands) MP Motorsport	23

- Note: Only the top five positions are included for both sets of standings.

== See also ==
- 2024 Bahrain Grand Prix
- 2024 Sakhir Formula 2 round

== Notes ==
Previous round: 2023 Monza Formula 3 round	FIA Formula 3 Championship; 2024 season	Next round: 2024 Melbourne Formula 3 round
Previous round: 2023 Sakhir Formula 3 round	Bahrain Formula 3 round	Next round: 2025 Sakhir Formula 3 round
