= Van Amersfoort Racing =

Dutch auto racing team

(Netherlands) Van Amersfoort Racing
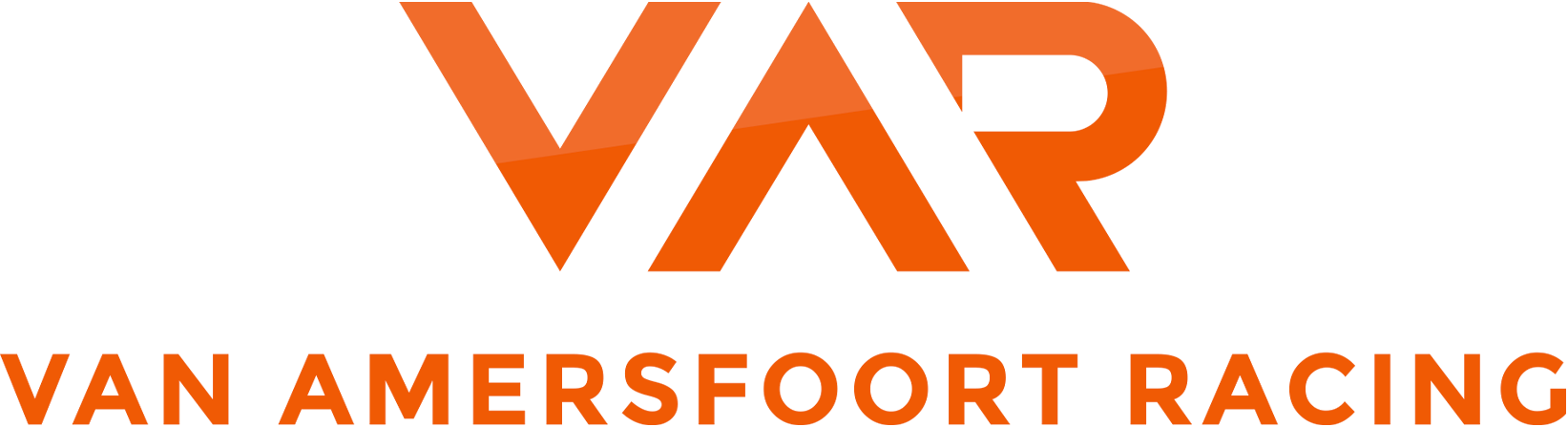
- Founded: 1975; 51 years ago
- Founder(s): Frits van Amersfoort
- Base: Zeewolde, Netherlands
- Team principal(s): Otmar Szafnauer (CEO); Brad Joyce (Team Principal)
- Current series: FIA Formula 2; FIA Formula 3; FR European; Italian F4; Spanish F4
- Former series: ADAC F4; Euroformula Open; FIA F3 European; F3 Euro Series; Formula Renault NEC; German F3; Dutch Formula Ford; Opel Lotus Euroseries; Formula Opel Lotus Benelux
- Current drivers: FIA Formula 2; 22. (Argentina) Nico Varrone; 23. (Mexico) Rafael Villagómez; FIA Formula 3; 14. (Japan) Hiyu Yamakoshi; 15. (France) Enzo Deligny; 16. (Spain) Bruno del Pino; FR European; 7. (France) Andrea Dupé; 11. (Portugal) Francisco Macedo; 55. (United Kingdom) Dion Gowda; Italian F4; 3. (Poland) Aleksander Ruta; 53. (Brazil) Pedro Lima; 87. (United Kingdom) Thomas Bearman
- Teams' Championships: Formula Renault 2.0 Netherlands; 2005; Italian F4; 2019, 2021; ADAC F4; 2020, 2021
- Drivers' Championships: Dutch Formula Ford; 1989: Marcel Albers; Formula Opel Lotus Benelux; 1992: Jos Verstappen; Opel Lotus Euroseries; 1996: Bas Leinders; German F3; 1998: Bas Leinders; 2007: Carlo van Dam; 2009: Laurens Vanthoor; 2011: Richie Stanaway; Formula Renault 2.0 Netherlands; 2005: Renger van der Zande; ADAC F4; 2016: Joey Mawson; 2020: Jonny Edgar; 2021: Oliver Bearman; Italian F4; 2019: Dennis Hauger; 2021: Oliver Bearman
- Website: www.vanamersfoortracing.nl

Van Amersfoort Racing (Dutch pronunciation: [vɑn ˈaːmərsfoːrt]; VAR) is an auto racing team based in the Netherlands. The team competes in FIA Formula 2, FIA Formula 3, Formula Regional European, and Italian F4.

Notable former drivers for the team include ten Formula One drivers: Jos Verstappen, Christijan Albers, Kevin Magnussen, Giedo van der Garde, Max Verstappen, Charles Leclerc, Mick Schumacher, Liam Lawson, Oliver Bearman, and Franco Colapinto.

== History ==
=== First steps (1975–1996) ===
The team was formed in 1975 by Frits van Amersfoort. They competed in such series as Formula Opel Lotus Benelux, Opel Lotus Euroseries and Dutch Formula Ford. In 1989 they reached their first major success, winning Formula Ford 1600 Netherlands championship with Marcel Albers. In 1992 they won Formula Opel Lotus Benelux with Jos Verstappen.

=== German Formula Three Championship (1997–2002) ===
In 1997, the team bought their first Formula Three car to compete in the 1997 German Formula Three Championship with Bas Leinders. The team collected three podiums and Leinders finished the season seventh. For the next year the team expanded to two cars, keeping Leinders and signing Christijan Albers Both drivers won nine from 20 races, with Leinders taking the first Formula 3 championship title for the team.

In 1999, the team raced with Thomas Mutsch, Etienne van der Linde, and Jacky van der Ende. Mutsch was the only driver who finished a race in the podium positions. For the next season the team once again completely changed their line-up, racing with Tom van Bavel and Jeroen Bleekemolen.

The team did not have a consistent line-up in 2001; it was the first season for the team when none of the drivers (Marc Caldonazzi, André Fibier, Allan Simonsen, and Marco du Pau) scored a podium position. The same situation repeated in 2002.

=== Formula Renault Netherlands (2003–2005) ===
After the merging of German and French Formula Three championships into the Formula 3 Euro Series, the team decided to switch to Formula Renault 2.0 Netherlands in 2003. Junior Strous and Giedo van der Garde finished the season as runner-up and fourth and had six and seven podiums respectively. For the next season the team signed Carlo van Dam and Renger van der Zande, who finished fifth and seventh respectively. For the last season of the series the team retain van der Zande and signed Récardo Bruins Choi with Dominick Muermans. It was the most successful season in the series with van der Zande claiming the drivers' title, and Bruins Choi taking the third place in the driver standings. While the team took the teams' title.

=== Return into the German Formula Three Championship (2006–2012) ===
In 2006 Van Amersfoort Racing returned to the German Formula Three Championship] continuing collaboration with Bruins Choi and Muermans. Bruins Choi took his first Formula Three podium in the series finale at Oschersleben. Following the merging of the Dutch Formula Renault championship to the Formula Renault 2.0 Northern European Cup, the team joined the new series with Dennis Swart and Gwendolyn Hertzberger, who had only episodic point-scoring finishes.

Bruins Choi was retained for the 2007, while Muermans was replaced by Carlo van Dam. The Dutch driver dominated the season, winning eleven races. He gave the team the first drivers' F3 title since Leinders. And with the two wins of Bruins Choi it mean that the drivers of the team won 13 from 18 races. In the NEC series the team retained Swart, who was joined by Stef Dusseldorp. Despite missing last three rounds of the season Dusseldorp outscored more experienced teammate.

For 2008 Rahel Frey and Laurens Vanthoor joined the team. Vanthoor had two wins with another six podiums. Also the team expanded to compete in 2008 ADAC Formel Masters with Emma Kimiläinen. She had one podium and finished the season in the top-ten of the driver standings. Dusseldorp continued to race for the team in the Northern European Cup, while Nigel Melker joined him in the team. Dusseldorp won the first race for the team in the series.

Vanthoor remained with the team in 2009, Dusseldorp was promoted from the NEC series and became Vanthoor's teammate. The team repeated the success of 2007, with eleven wins and a championship title for Vanthoor and two wins for Dusseldorp. In ADAC Formel Masters the team like in 2008 had only one driver Christian Wangard, who have competed in more than two thirds of the races. And like in 2008, Van Amersfoort's driver had one podium with the tenth place in the season standings. It was the last year of operation in the ADAC Formel Masters for the team, as the team decided to concentrate on the German F3 Championship. In the NEC series the team was presented by Mathijs Harkema, who finished just eighteenth.

In 2010 the team expanded to three cars in German F3, Dusseldorp remained with Daniel Abt and Willi Steindl were the new additions to the squad. Despite his Formula 3 debut Abt was more successful than Dusseldorp. With wins at Assen and Oschersleben he was a title contender till the last race when he was forced to retire due to a broken lambda sensor. Dusseldorp and Steindl were also the race winners but weren't consistent as Abt. Jeroen Mul and Liroy Stuart were the team drivers in the Northern European Cup. Mul won two races at Zandvoort and Oschersleben.

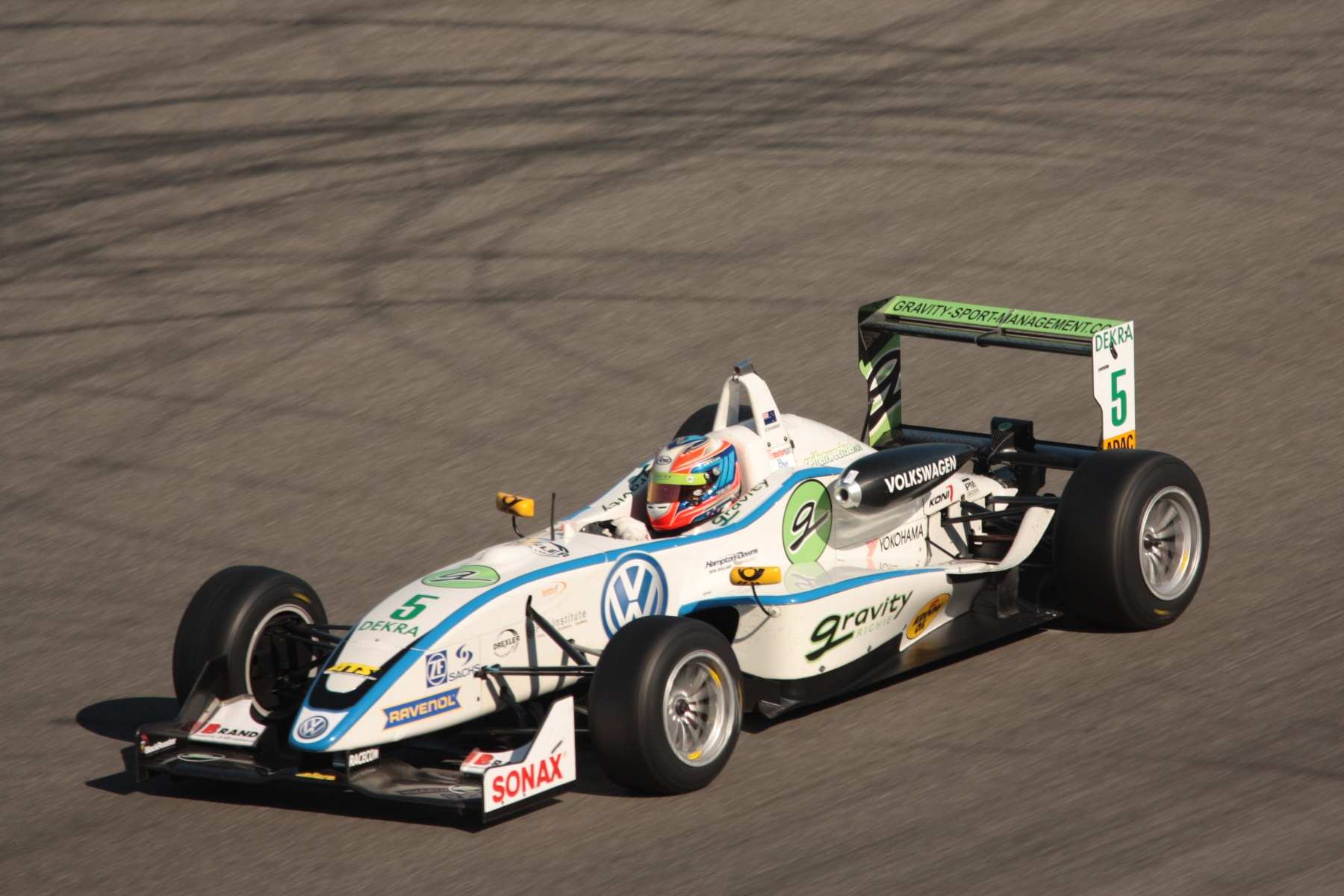
Richie Stanaway, driving for Van Amersfoort Racing during German Formula Three Championship race at Hockenheimn in 2011.

The team completely changed their driver line-up in 2011. Richie Stanaway, Jeroen Mul and Hannes van Asseldonk signed with the team. Stanaway had more wins during the season in the German F3 than any driver in the Van Amersfoort Racing history, taking 13 wins from 18 races and the championship title. The team participated in the NEC series with Dennis van de Laar and Meindert van Buuren. Van de Laar finished the season eighth with ten top-ten finishes, while van Buuren was only 21st with four top-ten finishes.

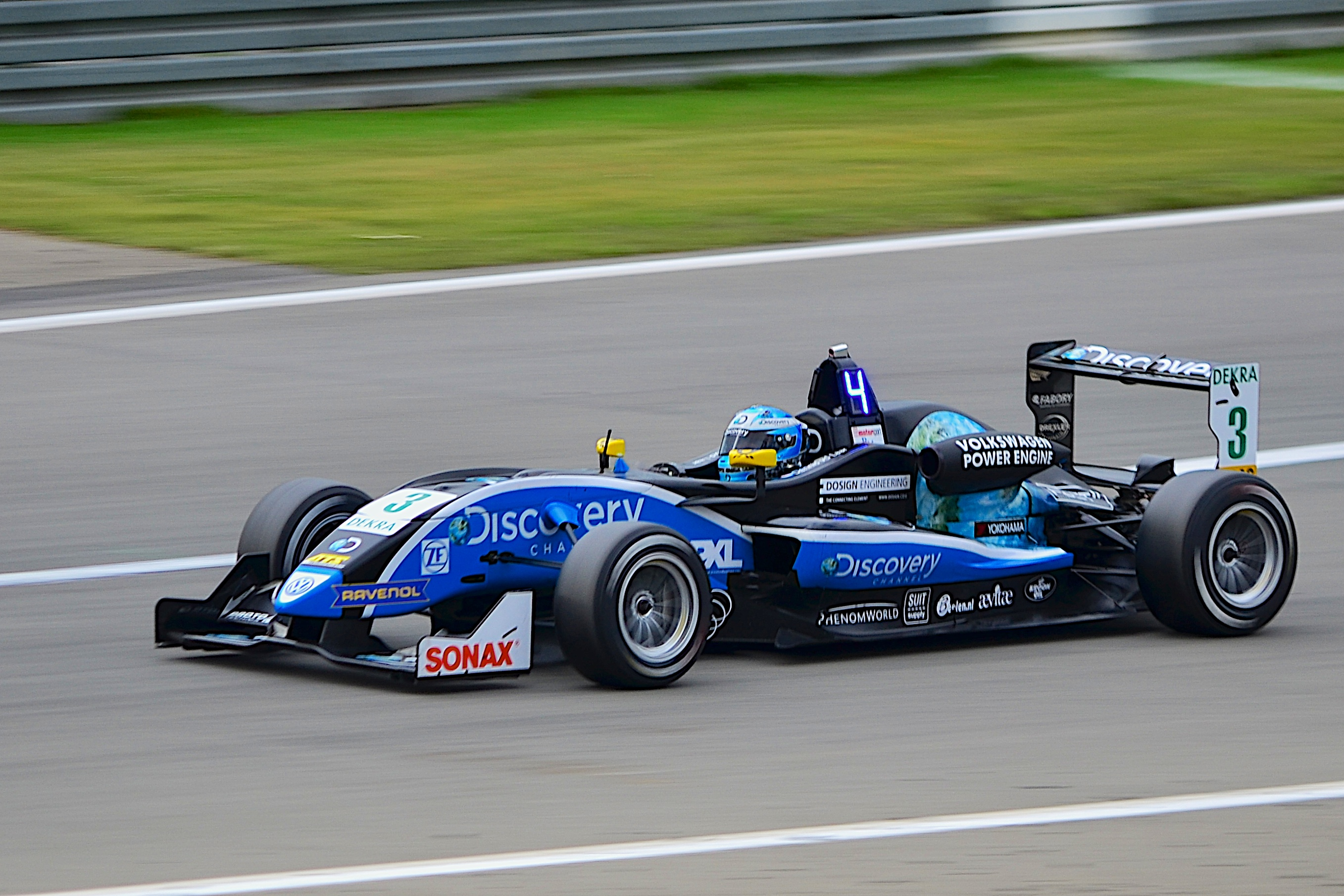
Dennis van de Laar, driving for Van Amersfoort Racing during German Formula Three Championship race at Nürburgring in 2012.

For 2012 the team again reshuffled their line-up. Lucas Auer, René Binder and Dennis van de Laar became the new drivers. Auer and Binder were the race winners, but they were beaten by Motopark driver Jimmy Eriksson. 2012 was the last season for the team in the Northern European Cup, where the team was presented by Jeroen Slaghekke and Roman Beregech. Slaghekke won the race and finished fourth in the series standings. Beregech wasn't consistent and competitive as Slaghekke, so finished only 29th.

=== FIA Formula 3 European Championship (2012–2018) ===
After two races in 2012 with Auer and van de Laar, the team moved to the FIA Formula 3 European Championship on the full-time basis in 2013. They kept van de Laar and signed Måns Grenhagen. The team had tough start, with just one podium finish of Sven Müller, who took Grenhagen's car for the last three rounds of the season. The team remained in the German F3 with Gustavo Menezes and Jordi Weckx as their drivers. Both of them wasn't able to give the fight to Lotus drivers, who occupied the top step of the podium in the races with the full-points distribution.

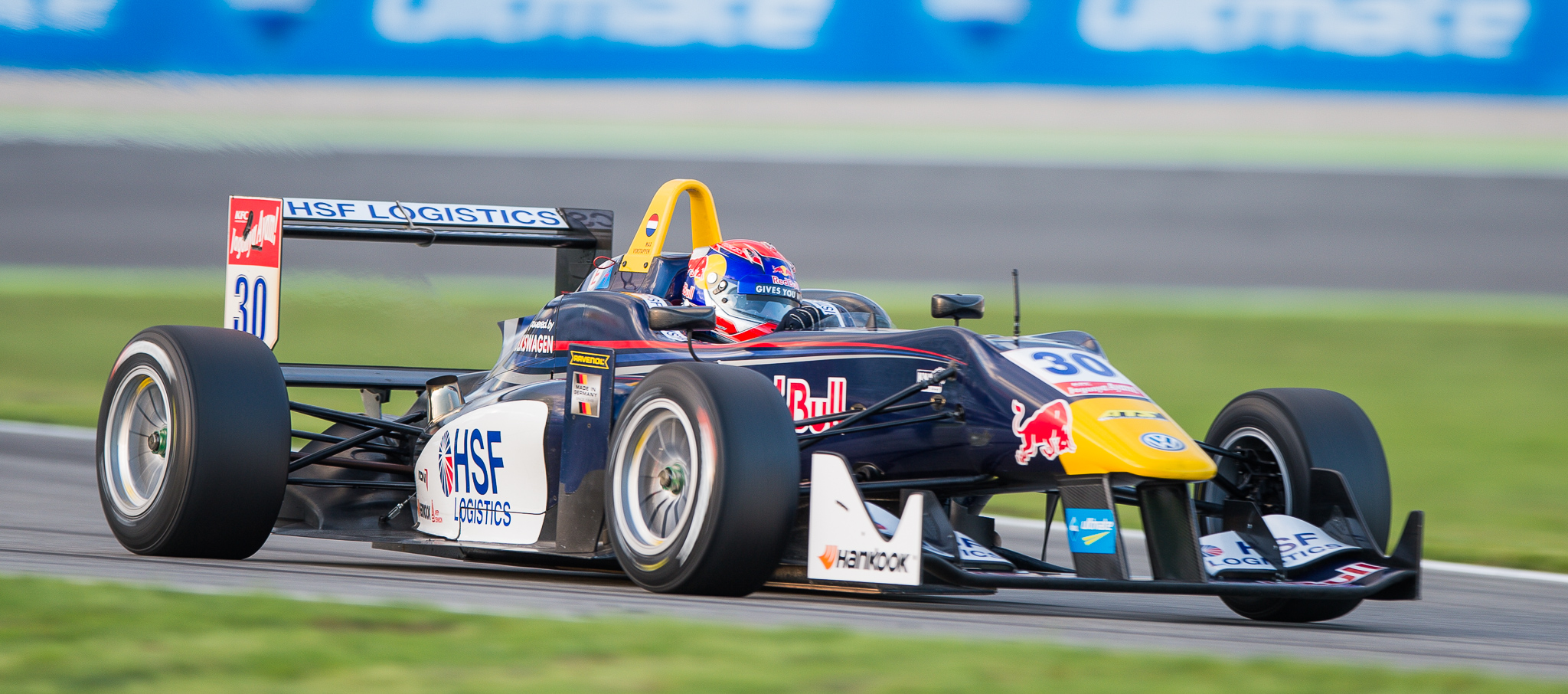
Max Verstappen, driving for Van Amersfoort Racing during FIA Formula 3 European Championship race at Hockenheim in 2014.

2014 was the last year of the German Formula Three Championship, Sam MacLeod and Weiron Tan were the teams' drivers. But once again they were overscored by Lotus drivers Markus Pommer and Nabil Jeffri. While in the European Championship the team signed with Gustavo Menezes, Jules Szymkowiak and Max Verstappen. Verstappen, who made his Single-seaters debut in the championship, had the longest winning streak in the championship with six consecutive wins, that he scored at Spa and Norisring. He finished the season in third place with 10 wins, one more than champion Esteban Ocon.

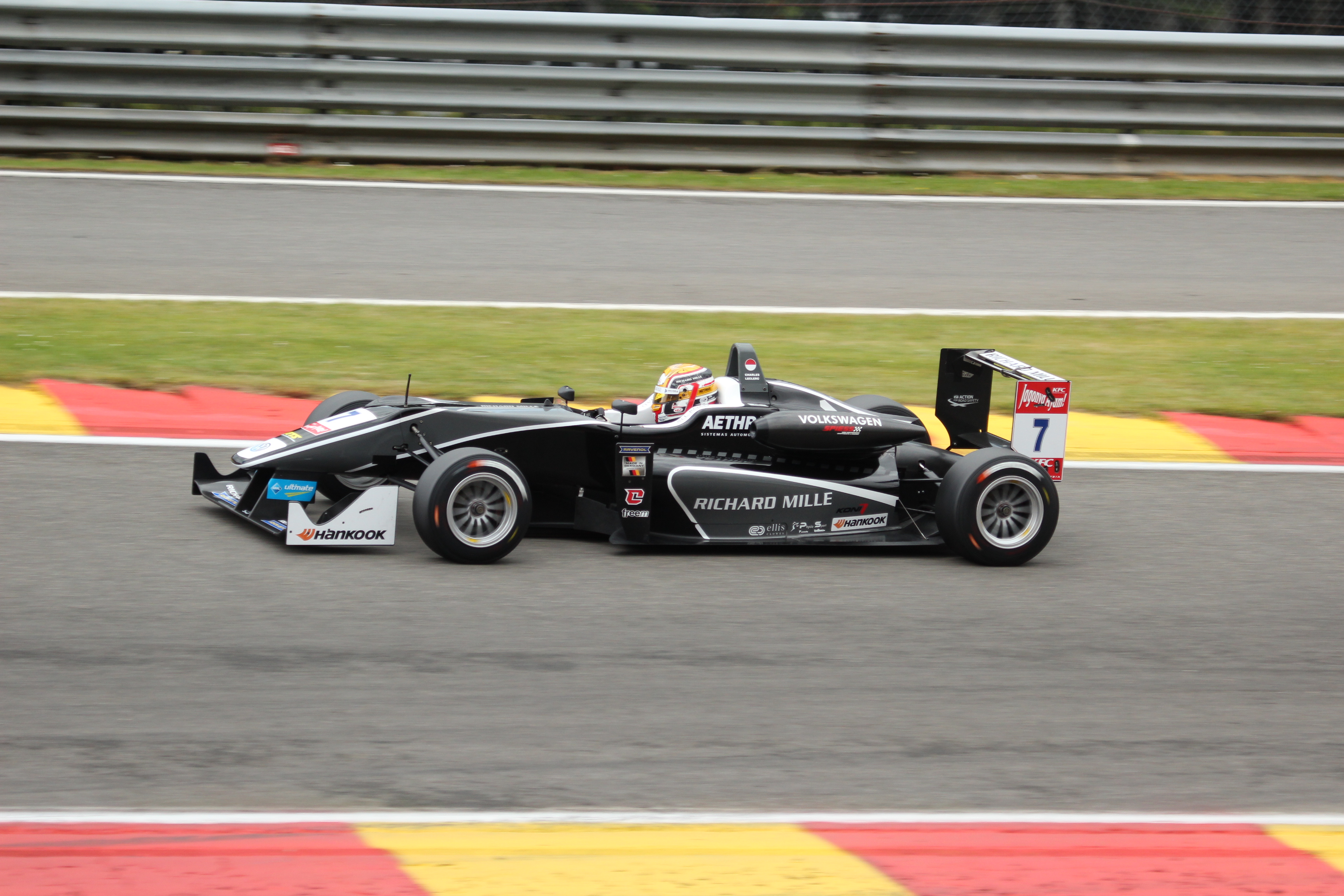
Charles Leclerc, driving for Van Amersfoort Racing during FIA Formula 3 European Championship race at Spa in 2015.

For 2015 the team signed Charles Leclerc, Alessio Lorandi and Arjun Maini. Leclerc was the only driver who had race wins and finished the season in top-five of the standings. The team also expanded to the new-for-2015 ADAC Formula 4. Harrison Newey, Joey Mawson and Mick Schumacher were the team drivers. Mawson had five race wins and finished the season third, while Schumacher had one race win and completed the top-ten in the standings.

The team completely changed their line-up in the 2016 FIA Formula 3 European Championship with signing of Anthoine Hubert, Callum Ilott, Harrison Newey and Pedro Piquet. Ilott and Hubert were the only race winners for the squad. The team retained Mawson in ADAC F4, while Schumacher moved to another team. They had a championship battle, which was won by Mawson. But in the teams' championship Van Amersfoort Racing lost just by 4.5 points to Prema Powerteam.

In 2017 the team remained in the European Championship with Newey and Piquet, adding to their squad David Beckmann and the ADAC F4 champion Mawson. It was the worst season in the championship for the team as none of drivers have visited the top step of the podium and they were last in the teams standings. Their drivers for the 2017 ADAC Formula 4 Championship were Felipe Drugovich, Kami Laliberté, Frederik Vesti and Louis Gachot. Drugovich was the title contender till the last race of the season, but lost the battle to Prema drivers Jüri Vips and Marcus Armstrong. The team title was again claimed by Prema, who outscored Van Amersfoort Racing by 71 points.

For the final 2018 FIA Formula 3 European Championship campaign, the Dutch team signed with Keyvan Andres and Artem Petrov, with Sophia Flörsch a later addition to the team. While in 2018 ADAC Formula 4 Championship the squad were represented by Joey Alders, Liam Lawson, Lucas Alecco Roy, Frederik Vesti and Charles Weerts, with Lawson finishing runner-up in the championship.

=== Formula European Masters and Formula 4 (2019–present) ===
In 2019, Van Amersfoort committed to the inaugural Formula European Masters championship, reuniting with Flörsch. For the ADAC Formula 4 championship, the team reunited with Roy and signed Ido Cohen, Niklas Krütten, Sebastian Estner and Red Bull Junior Dennis Hauger. Following the cancellation of the Formula European Masters championship, Van Amersfoort entered the inaugural Formula Regional European Championship with Flörsch. Hauger ended up winning the 2019 Italian F4 Championship, 136 points in front of the nearest competitor, thereby helping Van Amersfoort to win the team championship. The Norwegian driver also finished second in ADAC F4, only seven points behind Théo Pourchaire.

=== FIA Formula 2 and Formula 3 (2022–present) ===
In late 2021, it was announced VAR would replace HWA Racelab on the FIA Formula 2 and FIA Formula 3 grids from 2022 onwards.

== Current series results ==
=== FIA Formula 2 Championship ===
Year	Chassis	Engine	Tyres	Drivers	Races	Wins	Poles	F. Laps	Podiums	D.C.	Pts	T.C.	Pts
2022	Dallara; F2 2018	Mecachrome; V634T V6 t	P	(United Kingdom) Jake Hughes	16	0	0	0	0	16th	26	10th	73
2022	Dallara; F2 2018	Mecachrome; V634T V6 t	P	(Belgium) Amaury Cordeel	24	0	0	1	0	17th	26	10th	73
2022	Dallara; F2 2018	Mecachrome; V634T V6 t	P	(Germany) David Beckmann	12	0	0	1	0	18th	21 (Note: Points scored racing for Van Amersfoort Racing. Beckmann scored 4 points racing for other teams.)	10th	73
2022	Dallara; F2 2018	Mecachrome; V634T V6 t	P	(United States) Juan Manuel Correa	2	0	0	0	0	27th	0	10th	73
2023	Dallara; F2 2018	Mecachrome; V634T V6 t	P	(Netherlands) Richard Verschoor	26	1	0	1	3	9th	108	7th	121
2023	Dallara; F2 2018	Mecachrome; V634T V6 t	P	(United States) Juan Manuel Correa	26	0	0	0	0	19th	13	7th	121
2024	Dallara; F2 2024	Mecachrome; V634T V6 t	P	(Brazil) Enzo Fittipaldi	24	1	0	2	2	15th	61	11th	78
2024	Dallara; F2 2024	Mecachrome; V634T V6 t	P	(United Kingdom) John Bennett	4	0	0	0	0	28th	4	11th	78
2024	Dallara; F2 2024	Mecachrome; V634T V6 t	P	(Mexico) Rafael Villagómez	28	0	0	0	0	24th	13	11th	78
2025	Dallara; F2 2024	Mecachrome; V634T V6 t	P	(United Kingdom) John Bennett	27	0	0	0	0	22nd	1	10th	44
2025	Dallara; F2 2024	Mecachrome; V634T V6 t	P	(Mexico) Rafael Villagómez	27	0	0	0	2	14th	43	10th	44
2026	Dallara; F2 2024	Mecachrome; V634T V6 t	P	(Argentina) Nicolás Varrone	22	0	0	1	0	21st	15	9th	59*
2026	Dallara; F2 2024	Mecachrome; V634T V6 t	P	(Japan) Hiyu Yamakoshi	3	0	0	0	0	23rd	2	9th	59*
2026	Dallara; F2 2024	Mecachrome; V634T V6 t	P	(Mexico) Rafael Villagómez	25	0	0	0	3	13th	42	9th	59*

* Season still in progress.

==== In detail ====
(key)

Year	Drivers	1	2	3	4	5	6	7	8	9	10	11	12	13	14	15	16	17	18	19	20	21	22	23	24	25	26	27	28	29	T.C.	Points
2022		BHR; SPR	BHR; FEA	JED; SPR	JED; FEA	IMO; SPR	IMO; FEA	CAT; SPR	CAT; FEA	MCO; SPR	MCO; FEA	BAK; SPR	BAK; FEA	SIL; SPR	SIL; FEA	RBR; SPR	RBR; FEA	LEC; SPR	LEC; FEA	HUN; SPR	HUN; FEA	SPA; SPR	SPA; FEA	ZAN; SPR	ZAN; FEA	MNZ; SPR	MNZ; FEA	YAS; SPR	YAS; FEA		10th	73
2022	(United Kingdom) Jake Hughes	Ret	9	DSQ	4	18	12	20†	16	18	13	9	10	11	10	16	5														10th	73
2022	(Belgium) Amaury Cordeel	17^{F}	15	Ret	WD	DNS	17	19	15	17	Ret	13	Ret			18	18	Ret	15	13	17	18	17	12	6	15	7	5	6		10th	73
2022	(Germany) David Beckmann													16	19^{F}			10	14	12	14	8	6	14	13	7	5				10th	73
2022	(United States) Juan Manuel Correa																											18	17		10th	73
2023		BHR; SPR	BHR; FEA	JED; SPR	JED; FEA	ALB; SPR	ALB; FEA	BAK; SPR	BAK; FEA	MCO; SPR	MCO; FEA	CAT; SPR	CAT; FEA	RBR; SPR	RBR; FEA	SIL; SPR	SIL; FEA	HUN; SPR	HUN; FEA	SPA; SPR	SPA; FEA	ZAN; SPR	ZAN; FEA	MNZ; SPR	MNZ; FEA	YAS; SPR	YAS; FEA				7th	121
2023	(Netherlands) Richard Verschoor	22†	5^{F}	16	6	10	7	Ret	8	4	4	6	10	Ret	1	18	16	13	10	DSQ	6	12	4	3	13	3	Ret				7th	121
2023	(United States) Juan Manuel Correa	10	10	14	18	14	10	6	13	16	14	Ret	11	4	18	19	11	20	9	16	16	4	10	18	14	Ret	13				7th	121
2024		BHR; SPR	BHR; FEA	JED; SPR	JED; FEA	ALB; SPR	ALB; FEA	IMO; SPR	IMO; FEA	MCO; SPR	MCO; FEA	CAT; SPR	CAT; FEA	RBR; SPR	RBR; FEA	SIL; SPR	SIL; FEA	HUN; SPR	HUN; FEA	SPA; SPR	SPA; FEA	MNZ; SPR	MNZ; FEA	BAK; SPR	BAK; FEA	LUS; SPR	LUS; FEA	YAS; SPR	YAS; FEA		11th	78
2024	(Brazil) Enzo Fittipaldi	17^{F}	Ret	3	1^{F}	12	17	Ret	17	9	12	16	11	14	4	13	8	21	5	14	Ret	7	10	13	11						11th	78
2024	(United Kingdom) John Bennett																									12	8	15	14		11th	78
2024	(Mexico) Rafael Villagómez	19	12	14	9	15	7	11	16	15	Ret	17	16	19	16	14	16	11	10	21	Ret	16	8	16	Ret	17	Ret	12	Ret		11th	78
2025		ALB; SPR	ALB; FEA	BHR; SPR	BHR; FEA	JED; SPR	JED; FEA	IMO; SPR	IMO; FEA	MCO; SPR	MCO; FEA	CAT; SPR	CAT; FEA	RBR; SPR	RBR; FEA	SIL; SPR	SIL; FEA	SPA; SPR	SPA; FEA	HUN; SPR	HUN; FEA	MNZ; SPR	MNZ; FEA	BAK; SPR	BAK; FEA	LUS; SPR	LUS; FEA	YAS; SPR	YAS; FEA		10th	44
2025	(United Kingdom) John Bennett	18	C	17	20	20	20	19	20	Ret	11	Ret	18	15†	14	15	12	9	12	20	Ret	14	10	13	14	15	17	Ret	16		10th	44
2025	(Mexico) Rafael Villagómez	13	C	6	12	17	17	14	Ret	18	9	3	Ret	9	11	16	10	12	14	18	13	12	4	Ret	7	3	12	15	6		10th	44
2026		ALB; SPR	ALB; FEA	MIA; SPR	MIA; FEA	MTL; SPR	MTL; FEA	MCO; SPR	MCO; FEA	CAT; SPR	CAT; FEA	RBR; SPR	RBR; FEA	SIL; SPR	SIL; FEA	SPA; SPR	SPA; FEA	HUN; SPR	HUN; FEA	MNZ; SPR	MNZ; FEA	MAD; SPR	MAD; FEA	BAK; SPR	BAK; FE1	BAK; FE2	LUS; SPR	LUS; FEA	YAS; SPR	YAS; FEA	9th	59*
2026	(Argentina) Nicolás Varrone	21	17	4	13	16	6^{F}	12	20	12	13	12	16	18	13	NC	13	11	12	11	10	Ret	15								9th	59*
2026	(Japan) Hiyu Yamakoshi																							17	9	14					9th	59*
2026	(Mexico) Rafael Villagómez	13	11	Ret	Ret	Ret	Ret	16	21	17	11	3	Ret	3	2	16	6	15	Ret	17	19	13	14	13	8	Ret					9th	59*

* Season still in progress.

=== FIA Formula 3 Championship ===
Year	Chassis	Engine	Tyres	Drivers	Races	Wins	Poles	F. Laps	Podiums	D.C.	Pts	T.C.	Pts
2022	Dallara; F3 2019	Mecachrome; V634 V6	P	(Argentina) Franco Colapinto	18	2	1	0	5	9th	76	6th	91
2022	Dallara; F3 2019	Mecachrome; V634 V6	P	(Mexico) Rafael Villagómez	18	0	0	0	0	24th	2	6th	91
2022	Dallara; F3 2019	Mecachrome; V634 V6	P	(United Kingdom) Reece Ushijima	18	0	0	0	1	20th	13	6th	91
2023	Dallara; F3 2019	Mecachrome; V634 V6	P	(Brazil) Caio Collet	18	1	0	1	4	9th	73	7th	75
2023	Dallara; F3 2019	Mecachrome; V634 V6	P	(Mexico) Rafael Villagómez	18	0	0	0	0	25th	2	7th	75
2023	Dallara; F3 2019	Mecachrome; V634 V6	P	(Australia) Tommy Smith	18	0	0	0	0	27th	0	7th	75
2024	Dallara; F3 2019	Mecachrome; V634 V6	P	(Mexico) Noel León	20	0	0	1	4	10th	79	7th	91
2024	Dallara; F3 2019	Mecachrome; V634 V6	P	(Germany) Sophia Flörsch	20	0	0	0	0	29th	0	7th	91
2024	Dallara; F3 2019	Mecachrome; V634 V6	P	(Australia) Tommy Smith	20	0	0	0	0	20th	12	7th	91
2025	Dallara; F3 2025	Mecachrome; V634 V6	P	(France) Théophile Naël	19	0	0	1	3	8th	72	5th	138
2025	Dallara; F3 2025	Mecachrome; V634 V6	P	(Mexico) Santiago Ramos	17	2	0	0	3	15th	48	5th	138
2025	Dallara; F3 2025	Mecachrome; V634 V6	P	(United Kingdom) James Hedley	2	0	0	0	0	28th	0 (Note: Points scored racing for Van Amersfoort Racing. Hedley scored 7 points racing for other teams.)	5th	138
2025	Dallara; F3 2025	Mecachrome; V634 V6	P	(Portugal) Ivan Domingues	19	1	0	1	1	19th	18	5th	138
2026	Dallara; F3 2025	Mecachrome; V634 V6	P	(Japan) Hiyu Yamakoshi	19	0	1	1	3	9th	71	5th	168
2026	Dallara; F3 2025	Mecachrome; V634 V6	P	(France) Enzo Deligny	19	0	0	0	1	16th	40	5th	168
2026	Dallara; F3 2025	Mecachrome; V634 V6	P	(Spain) Bruno del Pino	19	1	0	2	2	11th	57	5th	168

==== In detail ====
(key)

Year	Drivers	1	2	3	4	5	6	7	8	9	10	11	12	13	14	15	16	17	18	19	20	T.C.	Points
2022		BHR; SPR	BHR; FEA	IMO; SPR	IMO; FEA	CAT; SPR	CAT; FEA	SIL; SPR	SIL; FEA	RBR; SPR	RBR; FEA	HUN; SPR	HUN; FEA	SPA; SPR	SPA; FEA	ZAN; SPR	ZAN; FEA	MNZ; SPR	MNZ; FEA			6th	91
2022	(Argentina) Franco Colapinto	25	5^{P}	1	22	Ret	8	13	Ret	3	6	2	15	15	12	13	3	1	15			6th	91
2022	(Mexico) Rafael Villagómez	17	12	9	20	14	Ret	26	Ret	Ret	15	17	21	23	19	28	Ret	26	Ret			6th	91
2022	(United Kingdom) Reece Ushijima	12	17	Ret	18	9	20	3	10	17	13	11	14	14	10	22	19	19	10			6th	91
2023		BHR; SPR	BHR; FEA	ALB; SPR	ALB; FEA	MCO; SPR	MCO; FEA	CAT; SPR	CAT; FEA	RBR; SPR	RBR; FEA	SIL; SPR	SIL; FEA	HUN; SPR	HUN; FEA	SPA; SPR	SPA; FEA	MNZ; SPR	MNZ; FEA			7th	75
2023	(Brazil) Caio Collet	3	14	21	16	9	Ret	17	12	3	3	4	15	23	19	1^{F}	5	19	4			7th	75
2023	(Mexico) Rafael Villagómez	Ret	19	14	19	16	16	27	25	Ret	15	20	16	17	17	23	21	10	10			7th	75
2023	(Australia) Tommy Smith	23	28†	Ret	12	21	15	18	23	21	18	26	25	24	29	24	18	Ret	20			7th	75
2024		BHR; SPR	BHR; FEA	ALB; SPR	ALB; FEA	IMO; SPR	IMO; FEA	MCO; SPR	MCO; FEA	CAT; SPR	CAT; FEA	RBR; SPR	RBR; FEA	SIL; SPR	SIL; FEA	HUN; SPR	HUN; FEA	SPA; SPR	SPA; FEA	MNZ; SPR	MNZ; FEA	7th	91
2024	(Mexico) Noel León	22	12	Ret	25	3	19	4	23	6	9	9	23	2	10	12	2	3^{F}	4	Ret	7	7th	91
2024	(Germany) Sophia Flörsch	23	30†	19	Ret	15	12	Ret	19	20	18	26	11	Ret	Ret	23	23	19	Ret	16	Ret	7th	91
2024	(Australia) Tommy Smith	28	22	27	Ret	24	28	13	12	18	25	21	22	21	4	25	24	25	16	23	15	7th	91
2025		ALB; SPR	ALB; FEA	BHR; SPR	BHR; FEA	IMO; SPR	IMO; FEA	MCO; SPR	MCO; FEA	CAT; SPR	CAT; FEA	RBR; SPR	RBR; FEA	SIL; SPR	SIL; FEA	SPA; SPR	SPA; FEA	HUN; SPR	HUN; FEA	MNZ; SPR	MNZ; FEA	5th	138
2025	(France) Théophile Naël	7	3	Ret	15	20	26	16	22†	5	2	11	10	19^{F}	2	22	C	9	5	10	18	5th	138
2025	(Mexico) Santiago Ramos	1	16	Ret	14	27†	1	Ret	16	2	Ret	13	27	15	8	21	C	12	19			5th	138
2025	(United Kingdom) James Hedley																			24	17	5th	138
2025	(Portugal) Ivan Domingues	21	19	Ret	19	25	Ret	Ret	20	1	6	Ret	21	17	11	29	C	24^{F}	24	Ret	Ret	5th	138
2026		ALB; SPR	ALB; FEA	MCO; SPR	MCO; FEA	CAT; SPR	CAT; FEA	RBR; SPR	RBR; FEA	SIL; SPR	SIL; FEA	SPA; SPR	SPA; FEA	HUN; SPR	HUN; FEA	MNZ; SPR	MNZ; FEA	MAD; SPR	MAD; FE1	MAD; FE2		5th	168*
2026	(Japan) Hiyu Yamakoshi	20	11	DSQ	13	7	2^{F}	8	8^{P}	12	8	26	2	26	10	3	6	17	15	Ret		5th	168*
2026	(France) Enzo Deligny	2	6	23	14	5	5	20	12	22	16	17	25	16	Ret	8	9	15	Ret	7		5th	168*
2026	(Spain) Bruno del Pino	1	4^{F}	2	6	6	6	10	17	21	18	15	11	18	14	10	12^{F}	4	Ret	17		5th	168*

=== Formula Regional European Championship ===
Year	Car	Drivers	Races	Wins	Poles	F. Laps	Podiums	D.C.	Pts	T.C.	Pts
2019	Tatuus F3 T-318- Alfa Romeo	(France) Alexandre Bardinon	18	0	0	0	0	20th	5	4th	264
2019	Tatuus F3 T-318- Alfa Romeo	(United Kingdom) Dan Ticktum	6	0	0	0	2	9th	64	4th	264
2019	Tatuus F3 T-318- Alfa Romeo	(Germany) Andreas Estner	3	0	0	0	0	17th	24	4th	264
2019	Tatuus F3 T-318- Alfa Romeo	(Australia) Joey Mawson	2	0	0	0	0	16th	24	4th	264
2019	Tatuus F3 T-318- Alfa Romeo	(Germany) Sophia Flörsch	24	0	0	1	0	7th	149	4th	264
2020	Tatuus F3 T-318- Alfa Romeo	(France) Pierre-Louis Chovet	23	1	1	3	7	5th	244	3rd	451
2020	Tatuus F3 T-318- Alfa Romeo	(Venezuela) Alessandro Famularo	9	0	0	0	0	11th	73	3rd	451
2020	Tatuus F3 T-318- Alfa Romeo	(Argentina) Facu Regalia†	3	0	0	0	0	NC	0	3rd	451
2020	Tatuus F3 T-318- Alfa Romeo	(Norway) Dennis Hauger	8	1	2	1	6	7th	134	3rd	451
2021	Tatuus F3 T-318- Alpine	(Italy) Francesco Pizzi	20	0	0	0	0	20th	12	7th	63
2021	Tatuus F3 T-318- Alpine	(Spain) Lorenzo Fluxá	19	0	0	0	0	25th	0	7th	63
2021	Tatuus F3 T-318- Alpine	(Spain) Mari Boya	20	0	0	0	1	14th	51	7th	63
2022	Tatuus F3 T-318- Alpine	(Hungary) Levente Révész	19	0	0	0	0	28th	0	4th	266
2022	Tatuus F3 T-318- Alpine	(Switzerland) Joshua Dufek	19	0	0	0	3	9th	79	4th	266
2022	Tatuus F3 T-318- Alpine	(Netherlands) Kas Haverkort	20	2	1	2	5	5th	184	4th	266
2023	Tatuus F3 T-318- Alpine	(Switzerland) Joshua Dufek	12	0	1	0	0	13th	52	3rd	226
2023	Tatuus F3 T-318- Alpine	(Mexico) Jesse Carrasquedo Jr.	4	0	0	0	0	42nd	0	3rd	226
2023	Tatuus F3 T-318- Alpine	(Portugal) Ivan Domingues†	4	0	0	0	0	NC	0	3rd	226
2023	Tatuus F3 T-318- Alpine	(Netherlands) Kas Haverkort	20	2	2	3	5	4th	174	3rd	226
2023	Tatuus F3 T-318- Alpine	(Netherlands) Niels Koolen	18	0	0	0	0	37th	0	3rd	226
2023	Tatuus F3 T-318- Alpine	(Italy) Nikita Bedrin†	2	0	0	0	0	NC	0	3rd	226
2024	Tatuus F3 T-318- Alpine	(Italy) Brando Badoer	20	0	1	2	7	5th	174	3rd	311
2024	Tatuus F3 T-318- Alpine	(Brazil) Pedro Clerot	20	0	0	0	2	8th	93	3rd	311
2024	Tatuus F3 T-318- Alpine	(Portugal) Ivan Domingues	20	0	0	0	2	10th	78	3rd	311
2025	Tatuus F3 T-318- Alpine	(Japan) Hiyu Yamakoshi	20	0	0	0	2	9th	86	3rd	351
2025	Tatuus F3 T-318- Alpine	(Brazil) Pedro Clerot	20	2	3	1	7	4th	235	3rd	351
2025	Tatuus F3 T-318- Alpine	(United Kingdom) Dion Gowda (Note: Gowda is an Indian driver who raced under the British flag in 2025 and the Indian flag in 2026.)	20	0	0	0	0	12th	38	3rd	351
2026	Tatuus T-326	(France) Andrea Dupé	19	0	0	0	1	26th	8	6th	90
2026	Tatuus T-326	(Portugal) Francisco Macedo	14	0	0	1	0	24th	10	6th	90
2026	Tatuus T-326	(Ukraine) Oleksandr Bondarev	5	1	1	0	2	15th	47	6th	90
2026	Tatuus T-326	(India) Dion Gowda	19	0	0	1	0	20th	25	6th	90

* Season still in progress.

† Guest drivers ineligible to score points.

==== In detail ====
(key) (Races in bold indicate pole position) (Races in italics indicate fastest lap)

Year	Drivers	1	2	3	4	5	6	7	8	9	10	11	12	13	14	15	16	17	18	19	20	21	22	23	24	25	T.C.	Points
2019		LEC; 1	LEC; 2	LEC; 3	VLL; 1	VLL; 2	VLL; 3	HUN; 1	HUN; 2	HUN; 3	RBR; 1	RBR; 2	RBR; 3	IMO; 1	IMO; 2	IMO; 3	IMO; 4	CAT; 1	CAT; 2	CAT; 3	MUG; 1	MUG; 2	MUG; 3	MNZ; 1	MNZ; 2	MNZ; 3	4th	264
2019	(France) Alexandre Bardinon							11	Ret	9	Ret	Ret	DNS	12	13	Ret	10	11	11	11	14	13	12	10	11	11	4th	264
2019	(United Kingdom) Dan Ticktum																	2	5	2	8	6	7				4th	264
2019	(Germany) Andreas Estner																							4	6	8	4th	264
2019	(Australia) Joey Mawson				4	4	C																				4th	264
2019	(Germany) Sophia Flörsch	9	8	5	9	5	C	7	4	6	6	6	5^{F}	7	8	4	7	9	8	5	6	8	9	6	10	9	4th	264
2020		MIS; 1	MIS; 2	MIS; 3	LEC; 1	LEC; 2	LEC; 3	RBR; 1	RBR; 2	RBR; 3	MUG; 1	MUG; 2	MUG; 3	MNZ; 1	MNZ; 2	MNZ; 3	CAT; 1	CAT; 2	CAT; 3	IMO; 1	IMO; 2	IMO; 3	VLL; 1	VLL; 2	VLL; 3		3rd	451
2020	(France) Pierre-Louis Chovet	5	5	7	3	4	7	5	4	7	5	2^{F}	7	11	3	5	7^{P F}	3	1^{F}	4	5	3	Ret	C	3		3rd	451
2020	(Venezuela) Alessandro Famularo							7	6	4	6	5	6	5	5	10											3rd	451
2020	(Argentina) Facu Regalia				7	7	8																				3rd	451
2020	(Norway) Dennis Hauger																3	2^{P}	2^{P}	2^{F}	4	5	1	C	2		3rd	451
2021		IMO; 1	IMO; 2	CAT; 1	CAT; 2	MCO; 1	MCO; 2	LEC; 1	LEC; 2	ZAN; 1	ZAN; 2	SPA; 1	SPA; 2	RBR; 1	RBR; 2	VAL; 1	VAL; 2	MUG; 1	MUG; 2	MNZ; 1	MNZ; 2						7th	63
2021	(Italy) Francesco Pizzi	18	17	21	15	15	12	20	32†	13	5	13	16	22	9	18	16	18	17	12	16						7th	63
2021	(Spain) Lorenzo Fluxá	19	13	14	20	DNS	Ret	Ret	19	20	15	12	20	19	16	19	23	19	24	23	19						7th	63
2021	(Spain) Mari Boya	10	8	5	19	9	8	Ret	31	7	9	11	13	10	14	3	7	Ret	12	Ret	12						7th	63
2022		MNZ; 1	MNZ; 2	IMO; 1	IMO; 2	MCO; 1	MCO; 2	LEC; 1	LEC; 2	ZAN; 1	ZAN; 2	HUN; 1	HUN; 2	SPA; 1	SPA; 2	RBR; 1	RBR; 2	CAT; 1	CAT; 2	MUG; 1	MUG; 2						4th	266
2022	(Hungary) Levente Révész	23	27	17	22	22	DNQ	25	Ret	21	24	22	19	28	20	21	18	14	30	25	Ret						4th	266
2022	(Switzerland) Joshua Dufek	18	13	12	10	DNQ	22	Ret	25	23	10	5	6	10	21	2	3	8	Ret	3	7						4th	266
2022	(Netherlands) Kas Haverkort	5	4	5	DSQ	3	4	9	2	2	15	1^{P F}	12	7	12	1^{F}	14	4	5	6	9						4th	266
2023		IMO; 1	IMO; 2	CAT; 1	CAT; 2	HUN; 1	HUN; 2	SPA; 1	SPA; 2	MUG; 1	MUG; 2	LEC; 1	LEC; 2	RBR; 1	RBR; 2	MNZ; 1	MNZ; 2	ZAN; 1	ZAN; 2	HOC; 1	HOC; 2						3rd	226
2023	(Switzerland) Joshua Dufek	8	Ret	6	5	6	4^{P}	14	21	5	25	23	20														3rd	226
2023	(Mexico) Jesse Carrasquedo Jr.													23	26	Ret	28										3rd	226
2023	(Portugal) Ivan Domingues																	22	20	Ret	16						3rd	226
2023	(Netherlands) Kas Haverkort	5	1^{F}	3	13	2	Ret	12	7	4	5	12	11	5	7	Ret	7	1^{P F}	14	5^{P}	3^{F}						3rd	226
2023	(Netherlands) Niels Koolen	29	19	26	29	28	Ret	29	30	24	Ret	Ret	26	27	25	19	24	25	23								3rd	226
2023	(Italy) Nikita Bedrin																			3	11						3rd	226
2024		HOC; 1	HOC; 2	SPA; 1	SPA; 2	ZAN; 1	ZAN; 2	HUN; 1	HUN; 2	MUG; 1	MUG; 2	LEC; 1	LEC; 2	IMO; 1	IMO; 2	RBR; 1	RBR; 2	CAT; 1	CAT; 2	MNZ; 1	MNZ; 2						3rd	311
2024	(Italy) Brando Badoer	4	5	8	10	10	2	2	2	2^{F}	2^{P F}	3	Ret	6	11	7	3	4	17	11	Ret						3rd	311
2024	(Brazil) Pedro Clerot	13	6	Ret	24	4	5	15	8	4	3	Ret	18	10	6	20	6	Ret	3	23†	Ret						3rd	311
2024	(Portugal) Ivan Domingues	5	3	17	27	7	7	10	17	3	7	4	8	Ret	16	18	10	10	10	13	15						3rd	311
2025		MIS; 1	MIS; 2	SPA; 1	SPA; 2	ZAN; 1	ZAN; 2	HUN; 1	HUN; 2	LEC; 1	LEC; 2	IMO; 1	IMO; 2	RBR; 1	RBR; 2	CAT; 1	CAT; 2	HOC; 1	HOC; 2	MNZ; 1	MNZ; 2						3rd	351
2025	(Japan) Hiyu Yamakoshi	8	9	5	2	7	2	6	8	6	12	Ret	11	6	11	Ret	15	14	24	Ret	Ret						3rd	351
2025	(Brazil) Pedro Clerot	4^{F}	5	25	16	2^{P}	1^{P}	2	10	5	4	4	5	4	1^{P}	3	2	6	7	3	7						3rd	351
2025	(United Kingdom) Dion Gowda	17	Ret	14	5	10	7	10	15	16	16	8	15	13	13	13	13	17	5	7	Ret						3rd	351
2026		RBR; 1	RBR; 2	RBR; 3	ZAN; 1	ZAN; 2	SPA; 1	SPA; 2	SPA; 3	MNZ; 1	MNZ; 2	MNZ; 3	HUN; 1	HUN; 2	LEC; 1	LEC; 2	IMO; 1	IMO; 2	IMO; 3	HOC; 1	HOC; 2						6th	90
2026	(France) Andrea Dupé	27	20	17	18	11	22	C	15	18	3	16	28	15	22	22	25†	24	19	25	19						6th	90
2026	(Portugal) Francisco Macedo	18	9	21	15	23	Ret	C	23	Ret	23	23	17	6	28^{F}	21											6th	90
2026	(Ukraine) Oleksandr Bondarev																10	2	1^{P}	8	7						6th	90
2026	(India) Dion Gowda	23	4^{F}	6	9	10	Ret	C	28†	15	17	13	21	27	19	18	16	16	7	Ret	24						6th	90

=== Italian F4 Championship ===
Year	Car	Drivers	Races	Wins	Poles	F/Laps	Podiums	Points	D.C.	T.C.
2017	Tatuus F4-T014	(Brazil) Felipe Drugovich	6	1	0	1	2	52	NC†	NC†
2017	Tatuus F4-T014	(United Kingdom) Louis Gachot	6	0	0	0	0	1	NC†	NC†
2017	Tatuus F4-T014	(Canada) Kami Laliberté	3	0	0	0	0	0	NC†	NC†
2018	Tatuus F4-T014	(Denmark) Frederik Vesti	3	2	1	1	3	68	10th	6th
2018	Tatuus F4-T014	(Belgium) Charles Weerts	3	0	0	0	0	15	18th	6th
2018	Tatuus F4-T014	(Germany) Lucas Alecco Roy	6	0	0	0	0	0	33rd	6th
2018	Tatuus F4-T014	(Germany) Andreas Estner	3	0	0	0	0	21	16th	6th
2018	Tatuus F4-T014	(Germany) Sebastian Estner	3	0	0	0	0	1	27th	6th
2018	Tatuus F4-T014	(Italy) Nicola Marinangeli	3	0	0	0	0	0	22nd	NC (Note: Entered as DR Formula/Curv Motorsport.)
2019	Tatuus F4-T014	(Germany) Niklas Krütten	12	0	1	0	4	78	11th	**1st**
2019	Tatuus F4-T014	(Israel) Ido Cohen	21	0	0	1	3	132	6th	**1st**
2019	Tatuus F4-T014	(Germany) Lucas Alecco Roy	21	0	1	0	1	35	14th	**1st**
2019	Tatuus F4-T014	(Germany) Sebastian Estner	3	0	0	0	0	2	24th	**1st**
2019	Tatuus F4-T014	(Norway) Dennis Hauger	21	12	7	9	16	369	**1st**	**1st**
2020	Tatuus F4-T014	(China) Cenyu Han	17	0	0	0	0	0	33rd	**2nd**
2020	Tatuus F4-T014	(United Kingdom) Jonny Edgar	14	2	1	3	6	169	4th	**2nd**
2020	Tatuus F4-T014	(Italy) Francesco Pizzi	20	3	1	2	7	208	**2nd**	**2nd**
2020	Tatuus F4-T014	(United States) Jak Crawford	14	2	1	0	7	150	6th	**2nd**
2020	Tatuus F4-T014	(Hungary) Bence Válint	17	0	0	0	0	8	21st	**2nd**
2021	Tatuus F4-T014	(United Kingdom) Oliver Bearman	21	11	8	2	15	343	**1st**	**1st**
2021	Tatuus F4-T014	(Austria) Joshua Dufek	21	1	3	2	5	154	7th	**1st**
2021	Tatuus F4-T014	(Russia) Nikita Bedrin	21	1	0	0	4	103	8th	**1st**
2021	Tatuus F4-T014	(Hungary) Bence Válint	21	0	0	0	0	20	21st	**1st**
2021	Tatuus F4-T014	(China) Cenyu Han	15	0	0	0	0	13	26th	**1st**
2021	Tatuus F4-T014	(Netherlands) Robert de Haan	3	0	0	0	0	0	39th	**1st**
2022	Tatuus F4-T421	(Norway) Martinius Stenshorne	20	0	0	0	2	122	7th	4th
2022	Tatuus F4-T421	(Italy) Brando Badoer	20	0	0	0	0	14	16th	4th
2022	Tatuus F4-T421	(United Kingdom) Arvid Lindblad	8	0	0	0	0	12	17th	4th
2022	Tatuus F4-T421	(Brazil) Emerson Fittipaldi Jr.	20	0	0	0	0	4	23rd	4th
2022	Tatuus F4-T421	(Belgium) Jules Castro	20	0	0	0	0	2	24th	4th
2022	Tatuus F4-T421	(United States) Arias Deukmedjian	9	0	0	0	0	1	27th	4th
2022	Tatuus F4-T421	(Belgium) Niels Koolen	5	0	0	0	0	0	42nd	14th (Note: Entered as Monlau Motorsport.)
2022	Tatuus F4-T421	(Mexico) Jesse Carrasquedo Jr.	3	0	0	0	0	0	51st	14th
2022	Tatuus F4-T421	(Belgium) Jef Machiels	5	0	0	0	0	0	52nd	14th
2023	Tatuus F4-T421	(Italy) Brando Badoer	21	0	1	3	5	165	6th	**3rd**
2023	Tatuus F4-T421	(Portugal) Ivan Domingues	17	0	0	0	1	56	11th	**3rd**
2023	Tatuus F4-T421	(United Kingdom) Freddie Slater	6	0	0	0	0	24	16th	**3rd**
2023	Tatuus F4-T421	(Brazil) Matheus Ferreira	21	0	0	0	0	15	18th	**3rd**
2023	Tatuus F4-T421	(Australia) Jack Beeton	20	0	0	0	0	2	23rd	**3rd**
2023	Tatuus F4-T421	(France) Pablo Sarrazin	3	0	0	0	0	0	28th	**3rd**
2023	Tatuus F4-T421	(Uzbekistan) Ismoilkhuja Akhmedkhodjaev	15	0	0	0	0	0	39th	**3rd**
2024	Tatuus F4-T421	(Japan) Hiyu Yamakoshi	21	2	3	3	7	220	**3rd**	**3rd**
2024	Tatuus F4-T421	(Sweden) Gustav Jonsson	21	0	0	0	2	108	8th	**3rd**
2024	Tatuus F4-T421	(Netherlands) Lin Hodenius	21	0	0	0	0	4	25th	**3rd**
2024	Tatuus F4-T421	(Italy) Alvise Rodella	15	0	0	0	0	0	28th	**3rd**
2024	Tatuus F4-T421	(Serbia) Andrija Kostić	18	0	0	0	0	0	35th	**3rd**
2024	Tatuus F4-T421	(United States) Hudson Schwartz	6	0	0	0	0	0	41st	**3rd**
2024	Tatuus F4-T421	(Australia) Dante Vinci	3	0	0	0	0	0	45th	**3rd**
2025	Tatuus F4-T421	(Italy) Maximilian Popov	20	0	0	1	5	143	6th	4th
2025	Tatuus F4-T421	(Norway) Marcus Sæter	20	0	0	0	0	35	15th	4th
2025	Tatuus F4-T421	(Australia) Dante Vinci	20	0	0	0	0	23	21st	4th
2025	Tatuus F4-T421	(Poland) Aleksander Ruta	20	0	0	0	0	17	23rd	4th
2025	Tatuus F4-T421	(United States) Payton Westcott	18	0	0	0	0	0	48th	4th
2026	Tatuus F4-T421	(Poland) Aleksander Ruta								
2026	Tatuus F4-T421	(Brazil) Pedro Lima								
2026	Tatuus F4-T421	(United Kingdom) Thomas Bearman								

D.C. = Drivers' Championship position, T.C. = Teams' Championship position. † Ineligible for the position in the championship ^{1} Italian F4 Trophy *Shared results with other team

=== Euro 4 Championship ===
Year	Car	Drivers	Races	Wins	Poles	F/Laps	Podiums	Points	D.C.	T.C.
2023	Tatuus F4-T421	(Italy) Brando Badoer	8	0	0	0	3	88.5	6th	**3rd**
2023	Tatuus F4-T421	(Portugal) Ivan Domingues	6	0	0	0	0	28	11th	**3rd**
2023	Tatuus F4-T421	(Australia) Jack Beeton	3	0	0	0	0	6	15th	**3rd**
2023	Tatuus F4-T421	(Denmark) Frederik Lund	9	0	0	0	0	4	17th	**3rd**
2023	Tatuus F4-T421	(France) Pablo Sarrazin	6	0	0	0	0	0	23rd	**3rd**
2023	Tatuus F4-T421	(Netherlands) Lin Hodenius	3	0	0	0	0	0	24th	**3rd**
2023	Tatuus F4-T421	(Italy) Giacomo Pedrini†	6	0	0	0	0	0	28th	**3rd**
2023	Tatuus F4-T421	(Peru) Rafael Modonese	3	0	0	0	0	0	31st	**3rd**
2023	Tatuus F4-T421	(Uzbekistan) Ismoilkhuja Akhmedkhodjaev	6	0	0	0	0	0	33rd	**3rd**
2024	Tatuus F4-T421	(Japan) Hiyu Yamakoshi	9	2	0	1	4	89	4th	**3rd**
2024	Tatuus F4-T421	(Sweden) Gustav Jonsson	9	0	0	0	3	56	7th	**3rd**
2024	Tatuus F4-T421	(Serbia) Andrija Kostić	9	0	0	0	0	8	15th	**3rd**
2024	Tatuus F4-T421	(Netherlands) Lin Hodenius	9	0	0	0	0	0	28th	**3rd**
2024	Tatuus F4-T421	(Italy) Alvise Rodella	6	0	0	0	0	0	31st	**3rd**
2024	Tatuus F4-T421	(United States) Hudson Schwartz	3	0	0	0	0	0	35th	**3rd**
2025	Tatuus F4-T421	(Italy) Maximilian Popov	9	0	0	0	1	45	8th	5th
2025	Tatuus F4-T421	(Australia) Dante Vinci	9	0	0	0	0	21	11th	5th
2025	Tatuus F4-T421	(Poland) Aleksander Ruta	9	0	0	0	0	11	13th	5th
2025	Tatuus F4-T421	(United States) Andre Rodriguez	9	0	0	0	0	0	34th	5th
2025	Tatuus F4-T421	(United States) Payton Westcott	9	0	0	0	0	0	35th	5th

† Pedrini drove for PHM Racing in round 2.

=== F4 Spanish Championship ===
Year	Car	Drivers	Races	Wins	Poles	F/Laps	Podiums	Points	D.C.	T.C.
2022	Tatuus F4-T421	(Netherlands) Robert de Haan	21	0	0	0	1	61	10th	6th (Note: Entered as Monlau Motorsport.)
2022	Tatuus F4-T421	(Norway) Martinius Stenshorne	3	0	0	0	0	22	17th	6th
2022	Tatuus F4-T421	(Belgium) Jef Machiels	21	0	0	0	0	0	26th	6th
2022	Tatuus F4-T421	(Germany) Jonas Ried	3	0	0	0	0	0	NC	6th
2022	Tatuus F4-T421	(Netherlands) Niels Koolen	3	0	0	0	0	0	NC	6th
2023	Tatuus F4-T421	(Brazil) Ricardo Gracia Filho	21	0	0	0	0	25	13th	7th (Note: Entered as Monlau Motorsport.)
2023	Tatuus F4-T421	(Brazil) Fernando Barrichello	21	0	0	0	0	6	17th	7th
2023	Tatuus F4-T421	(France) Pablo Sarrazin	21	0	0	0	0	3	23rd	7th
2023	Tatuus F4-T421	(Netherlands) Lin Hodenius	17	0	0	0	0	0	27th	7th
2024	Tatuus F4-T421	(Netherlands) Tim Gerhards	21	0	0	0	0	11	20th	11th (Note: Entered as Monlau Motorsport.)
2024	Tatuus F4-T421	(Germany) Lenny Ried	21	0	0	0	0	0	27th	11th
2024	Tatuus F4-T421	(India) Rehan Hakim	12	0	0	0	0	0	41st	11th
2024	Tatuus F4-T421	(Spain) Eloi González†	4	0	0	0	0	0	44th	11th
2024	Tatuus F4-T421	(Japan) Hiyu Yamakoshi	3	0	0	0	0	0	NC	11th
2024	Tatuus F4-T421	(United States) Hudson Schwartz	3	0	0	0	0	0	NC	11th
2025	Tatuus F4-T421	(Argentina) Francisco Monarca	12	0	0	0	0	6	19th	9th (Note: Entered as Monlau Motorsport.)
2025	Tatuus F4-T421	(Argentina) Santiago Baztarrica‡	15	0	0	0	0	1	23rd	9th
2025	Tatuus F4-T421	(Spain) Miquel Blascos	9	0	0	0	0	1	24th	9th
2025	Tatuus F4-T421	(Angola) Lorenzo Campos	18	0	0	0	0	0	27th	9th
2025	Tatuus F4-T421	(Brazil) Alexander Jacoby	21	0	0	0	0	0	30th	9th
2025	Tatuus F4-T421	(United States) Andre Rodriguez	3	0	0	0	0	0	NC	9th

† González drove for Drivex in round 2.

‡ Baztaricca drove for TC Racing until round 4.

=== Formula Winter Series ===
Year	Car	Drivers	Races	Wins	Poles	F/Laps	Podiums	Points	D.C.	T.C
2024	Tatuus F4-T421	(Netherlands) Lin Hodenius	3	0	0	0	0	6	24th	9th
2024	Tatuus F4-T421	(Netherlands) Tim Gerhards	6	0	0	0	0	0	33rd	9th
2024	Tatuus F4-T421	(Germany) Lenny Ried	11	0	0	0	0	0	38th	9th
2025	Tatuus F4-T421	(Italy) Maksimilian Popov	12	0	0	0	2	88	5th	4th
2025	Tatuus F4-T421	(Australia) Dante Vinci	12	0	0	0	0	26	14th	4th
2025	Tatuus F4-T421	(Poland) Aleksander Ruta†	12	0	0	1	0	2	22nd	4th
2025	Tatuus F4-T421	(Argentina) Gino Trappa	6	0	0	0	0	1	23rd	4th
2025	Tatuus F4-T421	(United States) Payton Westcott	12	0	0	0	0	0	28th	4th
2026	Tatuus F4-T421	(United Kingdom) Thomas Bearman	15	0	2	1	8	159	**2nd**	**3rd**
2026	Tatuus F4-T421	(Poland) Aleksander Ruta	10	1	0	0	3	93	6th	**3rd**
2026	Tatuus F4-T421	(Netherlands) Rocco Coronel	9	1	0	1	2	70	9th	**3rd**
2026	Tatuus F4-T421	(Brazil) Pedro Lima	15	0	0	0	0	62	10th	**3rd**
2026	Tatuus F4-T421	(Kyrgyzstan) Platon Kostin	6	0	0	0	0	4	24th	**3rd**

† Ruta drove for Cram Motorsport until round 3.

== Former series results ==
=== German Formula Three Championship ===
German Formula Three Championship results
Year	Car	Drivers	Races	Wins	Poles	F/Laps	Podiums	Points	D.C.	T.C.
1997	Dallara F397-Opel	(Belgium) Bas Leinders	18	0	2	1	4	100	7th	N/A
1998	Dallara F398-Opel	(Belgium) Bas Leinders	20	7	9	4	11	200	1st	N/A
1998	Dallara F398-Opel	(Netherlands) Christijan Albers	20	2	1	1	5	120	5th	N/A
1999	Dallara F399-Opel	(Germany) Thomas Mutsch	18	0	1	3	2	97	7th	N/A
1999	Dallara F399-Opel	(South Africa) Etienne van der Linde	10	0	0	0	0	25	12th	N/A
1999	Dallara F399-Opel	(Netherlands) Jacky van der Ende	8	0	0	0	0	22	13th	N/A
2000	Dallara F399-Opel	(Belgium) Tom van Bavel	18	0	0	0	2	52	11th	N/A
2000	Dallara F399-Opel	(Netherlands) Jeroen Bleekemolen	18	0	1	0	0	36	16th	N/A
2001	Dallara F300-Opel	(Italy) Marc Caldonazzi	10	0	0	0	0	2	28th	N/A
2001	Dallara F300-Opel	(Denmark) Allan Simonsen	8	0	0	0	0	0	34th	N/A
2001	Dallara F300-Opel	(Germany) André Fibier	2	0	0	0	0	0	42nd	N/A
2001	Dallara F399-Opel	(Netherlands) Marco du Pau	12	0	0	0	0	2	29th	N/A
2002	Dallara F302-Opel	(Japan) Kaichi Sato	6	0	0	0	0	1	18th	N/A
2002	Dallara F302-Opel	(Netherlands) Jaap van Lagen	8	0	0	0	0	0	34th	N/A
2002	Dallara F300-Opel	(Germany) Catharina Felser	16	0	0	0	0	2	28th†	N/A
2004	Dallara F302-Opel	(China) Ho-Pin Tung	18	0	0	1	4	111	7th	N/A
2005	Dallara F302-Opel	(Netherlands) Paul Meijer	2	0	0	0	0	5	15th	N/A
2006	Dallara F305-Opel	(South Korea) Récardo Bruins Choi	18	0	0	0	1	38	7th	N/A
2006	Dallara F306-Opel	(Netherlands) Dominick Muermans	18	0	0	0	0	3	23rd	N/A
2007	Dallara F305-Opel	(Netherlands) Carlo van Dam	18	9	10	7	16	159	1st	N/A
2007	Dallara F306-Opel	(South Korea) Récardo Bruins Choi	18	2	2	2	6	95	4th	N/A
2008	Dallara F306-Volkswagen	(Belgium) Laurens Vanthoor	18	2	3	2	9	85	4th	N/A
2008	Dallara F305-Volkswagen	(Switzerland) Rahel Frey	16	0	0	0	0	5	14th	N/A
2008	Dallara F305-Volkswagen	(Republic of Ireland) Niall Quinn	2	0	0	0	0	N/A	NC	N/A
2009	Dallara F306-Volkswagen	(Belgium) Laurens Vanthoor	18	11	11	10	15	163	1st	N/A
2009	Dallara F306-Volkswagen	(Netherlands) Stef Dusseldorp	18	2	1	4	11	106	2nd	N/A
2009	Dallara F305-Volkswagen	(India) Armaan Ebrahim	2	0	0	0	0	N/A	NC	N/A
2010	Dallara F306-Volkswagen	(Germany) Daniel Abt	18	2	6	5	10	112	2nd	N/A
2010	Dallara F306-Volkswagen	(Netherlands) Stef Dusseldorp	18	2	3	3	9	88	4th	N/A
2010	Dallara F305-Opel	(Austria) Willi Steindl	18	1	0	0	2	43	7th	N/A
2011	Dallara F306-Volkswagen	(New Zealand) Richie Stanaway	18	13	10	8	16	181	1st	N/A
2011	Dallara F306-Volkswagen	(Netherlands) Hannes van Asseldonk	18	0	2	1	5	61	5th	N/A
2011	Dallara F305-Volkswagen	(Netherlands) Jeroen Mul	18	0	0	0	0	18	10th	N/A
2012	Dallara F308-VW Power Engine	(Austria) Lucas Auer	27	2	2	4	11	298	2nd	N/A
2012	Dallara F308-VW Power Engine	(Austria) René Binder	27	3	0	1	7	191	6th	N/A
2012	Dallara F308-VW Power Engine	(Netherlands) Dennis van de Laar	24	0	0	0	1	110	9th	N/A
2012	Dallara F308-VW Power Engine	(Germany) Daniel Abt	3	0	0	0	1	18	14th	N/A
2013	Dallara F308-VW Power Engine	(United States) Gustavo Menezes	26	2	0	2	8	241	4th	2nd
2013	Dallara F308-VW Power Engine	(Belgium) Jordi Weckx	20	0	0	0	0	29	12th	2nd
2014	Dallara F311-VW Power Engine	(United Kingdom) Sam MacLeod	24	3	1	6	12	243	4th	2nd
2014	Dallara F308-VW Power Engine	(Malaysia) Weiron Tan	24	2	0	0	5	182	5th	2nd

†Shared results with the other team

=== Formula Renault 2.0 Northern European Cup ===
Formula Renault 2.0 Northern European Cup results
Year	Car	Drivers	Races	Wins	Poles	F/Laps	Podiums	Points	D.C.	T.C.
2006	Tatuus FR2000	(Netherlands) Dennis Swart	16	0	0	0	0	104	14th	N/A
2006	Tatuus FR2000	(Netherlands) Gwendolyn Hertzberger	16	0	0	0	0	74	20th	N/A
2007	Tatuus FR2000	(Netherlands) Stef Dusseldorp	10	0	0	0	0	77	13th	N/A
2007	Tatuus FR2000	(Netherlands) Dennis Swart	16	0	0	0	0	74	17th	N/A
2008	Tatuus FR2000	(Netherlands) Stef Dusseldorp	16	1	0	0	3	224	4th	N/A
2008	Tatuus FR2000	(Netherlands) Nigel Melker	16	0	0	0	0	120	12th	N/A
2009	Tatuus FR2000	(Netherlands) Mathijs Harkema	12	0	0	0	0	82	17th	N/A
2010	Barazi-Epsilon FR2.0-10	(Netherlands) Jeroen Mul	19	2	2	3	6	304	3rd	N/A
2010	Barazi-Epsilon FR2.0-10	(Netherlands) Liroy Stuart	19	0	0	0	4	267	4th	N/A
2011	Barazi-Epsilon FR2.0-10	(Netherlands) Dennis van de Laar	20	0	0	0	0	186	7th	6th
2011	Barazi-Epsilon FR2.0-10	(Netherlands) Meindert van Buuren	17	0	0	0	0	85	21st	6th
2011	Barazi-Epsilon FR2.0-10	(United Kingdom) Jack Hawksworth	3	0	0	0	0	26	32nd	6th
2012	Barazi-Epsilon FR2.0-10	(Netherlands) Jeroen Slaghekke	20	1	3	0	2	241	4th	3rd
2012	Barazi-Epsilon FR2.0-10	(Russia) Roman Beregech	20	0	0	0	0	48	29th	3rd

=== ADAC Formel Masters ===
ADAC Formel Masters results
Year	Car	Drivers	Races	Wins	Poles	F/Laps	Podiums	Points	D.C.	T.C.
2008	Dallara Formulino-Volkswagen	(Finland) Emma Kimiläinen	16	0	0	1	1	76	10th	7th
2008	Dallara Formulino-Volkswagen	(Denmark) Kevin Magnussen	6	0	0	1	2	30	12th	7th
2009	Dallara Formulino-Volkswagen	(Germany) Christian Wangard	12	0	0	0	1	32	10th	7th
2009	Dallara Formulino-Volkswagen	(Netherlands) Liroy Stuart	4	0	0	0	2	31	11th	7th
2009	Dallara Formulino-Volkswagen	(Germany) Ferdinand Stuck	8	0	0	0	0	18	15th	7th
2009	Dallara Formulino-Volkswagen	(India) Saran Vikram	2	0	0	0	0	0	24th	7th
2009	Dallara Formulino-Volkswagen	(Netherlands) Justin Ros	2	0	0	0	2	31	26th	7th

=== FIA European Formula 3 Championship ===
FIA Formula 3 European Championship results
Year	Car	Drivers	Races	Wins	Poles	F/Laps	Podiums	Points	D.C.	T.C.
2012	Dallara F312-Volkswagen	(Austria) Lucas Auer	2	0	0	0	0	0	NC	N/A
2012	Dallara F312-Volkswagen	(Netherlands) Dennis van de Laar	2	0	0	0	0	0	NC	N/A
2013	Dallara F312-Volkswagen	(Germany) Sven Müller	30	0	0	0	1	122	9th†	7th
2013	Dallara F312-Volkswagen	(Netherlands) Dennis van de Laar	30	0	0	0	0	22	20th	7th
2013	Dallara F312-Volkswagen	(Sweden) Måns Grenhagen	14	0	0	0	0	0	26th	7th
2014	Dallara F314-Volkswagen	(Netherlands) Max Verstappen	33	10	7	7	16	411	3rd	4th
2014	Dallara F312-Volkswagen	(United States) Gustavo Menezes	33	0	0	0	1	91	11th	4th
2014	Dallara F312-Volkswagen	(Netherlands) Jules Szymkowiak	33	0	0	0	0	17	20th	4th
2015	Dallara F316-Volkswagen	(Monaco) Charles Leclerc	33	4	3	5	13	363.5	4th	3rd
2015	Dallara F312-Volkswagen	(India) Arjun Maini	33	0	0	0	0	27	18th	3rd
2015	Dallara F312-Volkswagen	(Italy) Alessio Lorandi	33	0	0	0	0	26	20th	3rd
2016	Dallara F316-Mercedes	(United Kingdom) Callum Ilott	30	2	2	3	6	226	6th	4th
2016	Dallara F316-Mercedes	(France) Anthoine Hubert	30	1	1	1	3	160	8th	4th
2016	Dallara F316-Mercedes	(United Kingdom) Harrison Newey	30	0	0	0	0	22	18th	4th
2016	Dallara F316-Mercedes	(Brazil) Pedro Piquet	30	0	0	0	0	19	19th	4th
2017	Dallara F312-Mercedes	(United Kingdom) Harrison Newey	30	0	0	0	0	106	11th	5th
2017	Dallara F316-Mercedes	(Australia) Joey Mawson	30	0	0	0	1	83	13th	5th
2017	Dallara F316-Mercedes	(Brazil) Pedro Piquet	30	0	0	0	1	80	14th	5th
2017	Dallara F317-Mercedes	(Germany) David Beckmann	30	0	0	0	0	45	16th†	5th
2017	Dallara F317-Mercedes	(Belgium) Max Defourny	3	0	0	0	0	2	18th	5th
2017	Dallara F317-Mercedes	(Brazil) Felipe Drugovich	3	0	0	0	0	N/A	NC	5th
2018	Dallara F316-Mercedes	(Russia) Artem Petrov	30	0	0	0	0	7	20th	5th
2018	Dallara F316-Mercedes	(Germany) Sophia Flörsch	21	0	0	0	0	1	22nd	5th
2018	Dallara F316-Mercedes	(Denmark) Frederik Vesti	3	0	0	0	0	0	NC	5th
2018	Dallara F317-Mercedes	(Iran) Keyvan Andres	30	0	0	0	1	18	18th	5th

†Shared results with the other team

=== Euroformula Open Championship ===
Year	Car	Drivers	Races	Wins	Poles	F/laps	Podiums	Points	D.C.	T.C.
2020	Dallara 320-Mercedes-Benz	(Germany) Sebastian Estner	18	0	0	1	2	76	10th	3rd
2020	Dallara 320-Mercedes-Benz	(Germany) Andreas Estner	18	0	0	0	6	177	3rd	3rd
2020	Dallara 320-Mercedes-Benz	(France) Alexandre Bardinon	18	0	0	0	0	9	16th	3rd
2021	Dallara 320-Mercedes-Benz	(Turkey) Cem Bölükbaşı	15	2	1	1	8	217	5th	3rd
2021	Dallara 320-Mercedes-Benz	(United Kingdom) Casper Stevenson	24	2	0	0	4	217	6th	3rd
2021	Dallara 320-Mercedes-Benz	(Mexico) Rafael Villagómez	18	0	0	0	5	135	8th	3rd
2021	Dallara 320-Mercedes-Benz	(Germany) Andreas Estner	3	0	0	0	0	6	21st	3rd
2022	Dallara 320-Mercedes-Benz	(Denmark) Sebastian Øgaard	11	1	0	0	2	114	8th	4th
2022	Dallara 320-Mercedes-Benz	(Romania) Filip Ugran	11	0	0	1	1	92	9th	4th
2022	Dallara 320-Mercedes-Benz	(Italy) Nicola Marinangeli	8	0	0	0	0	36	12th	4th
2022	Dallara 320-Mercedes-Benz	(Poland) Filip Kaminiarz	3	0	0	0	0	3	17th	4th

=== ADAC Formula 4 ===
ADAC Formula 4 results
Year	Car	Drivers	Races	Wins	Poles	F/Laps	Podiums	Points	D.C.	T.C.
2015	Tatuus F4-T014	(Australia) Joey Mawson	24	5	1	3	11	297	3rd	N/A
2015	Tatuus F4-T014	(Germany) Mick Schumacher	24	1	0	0	0	92	10th	N/A
2015	Tatuus F4-T014	(United Kingdom) Harrison Newey	18	0	0	0	0	42	16th	N/A
2015	Tatuus F4-T014	(Canada) Kami Laliberté	9	0	0	0	0	5	25th	N/A
2016	Tatuus F4-T014	(Australia) Joey Mawson	24	10	7	6	16	374	1st	2nd
2016	Tatuus F4-T014	(Canada) Kami Laliberté	24	1	0	1	4	94.5	9th	2nd
2016	Tatuus F4-T014	(Netherlands) Leonard Hoogenboom	18	0	0	0	1	25	18th‡	2nd
2016	Tatuus F4-T014	(Switzerland) Moritz Müller-Crepon	9	0	0	0	0	5	22nd	2nd
2017	Tatuus F4-T014	(Brazil) Felipe Drugovich	21	7	3	6	9	236.5	3rd	2nd
2017	Tatuus F4-T014	(Denmark) Frederik Vesti	21	1	0	2	3	113	7th	2nd
2017	Tatuus F4-T014	(Canada) Kami Laliberté	15	1	1	1	1	76	12th	2nd
2017	Tatuus F4-T014	(Russia) Artem Petrov	12	1	0	0	2	56	15th‡	2nd
2017	Tatuus F4-T014	(United Kingdom) Louis Gachot	21	0	0	0	1	51	16th	2nd
2018	Tatuus F4-T014	(Denmark) Frederik Vesti	20	2	1	2	8	211	4th	2nd
2018	Tatuus F4-T014	(Belgium) Charles Weerts	20	1	0	1	4	195	5th	2nd
2018	Tatuus F4-T014	(Germany) Lucas Alecco Roy	20	0	0	0	0	0	18th	2nd
2018	Tatuus F4-T014	(Netherlands) Joey Alders	20	0	0	0	0	44	11th	2nd
2018	Tatuus F4-T014	(New Zealand) Liam Lawson	20	3	3	0	11	234	2nd	2nd
2019	Tatuus F4-T014	(Germany) Niklas Krütten	11	1	0	0	2	93	10th	2nd
2019	Tatuus F4-T014	(Israel) Ido Cohen	20	0	0	0	1	76	13th	2nd
2019	Tatuus F4-T014	(Germany) Lucas Alecco Roy	20	0	0	1	0	11	17th	2nd
2019	Tatuus F4-T014	(Germany) Sebastian Estner	20	1	0	0	1	55	14th	2nd
2019	Tatuus F4-T014	(Norway) Dennis Hauger	20	6	5	8	10	251	2nd	2nd
2020	Tatuus F4-T014	(China) Cenyu Han	6	0	0	0	0	0	18th	1st
2020	Tatuus F4-T014	(United Kingdom) Jonny Edgar	21	6	5	6	11	300	1st	1st
2020	Tatuus F4-T014	(Italy) Francesco Pizzi	9	0	0	0	0	54	11th	1st
2020	Tatuus F4-T014	(United States) Jak Crawford	21	5	4	5	12	298	2nd	1st
2021	Tatuus F4-T014	(United Kingdom) Oliver Bearman	18	6	5	4	11	295	1st	1st
2021	Tatuus F4-T014	(Russia) Nikita Bedrin	18	2	0	0	5	147	5th	1st
2021	Tatuus F4-T014	(Switzerland) Joshua Dufek	15	0	0	0	4	127	7th	1st
2021	Tatuus F4-T014	(China) Cenyu Han	6	0	0	0	1	25	13th	1st
2021	Tatuus F4-T014	(Netherlands) Robert de Haan	3	0	0	0	0	24	14th	1st
2021	Tatuus F4-T014	(Hungary) Bence Válint	9	0	0	1	0	18	16th	1st
2021	Tatuus F4-T014	(Australia) Marcos Flack	3	0	0	0	0	4	19th	1st
2022	Tatuus F4-T421	(United States) Arias Deukmedjian	6	0	0	0	0	0	NC†	NC†
2022	Tatuus F4-T421	(Brazil) Emerson Fittipaldi Jr.	6	0	0	0	0	0	NC†	NC†
2022	Tatuus F4-T421	(Italy) Brando Badoer	6	0	0	0	0	0	NC†	NC†
2022	Tatuus F4-T421	(Norway) Martinius Stenshorne	6	0	0	0	0	0	NC†	NC†
2022	Tatuus F4-T421	(Belgium) Jules Castro	6	0	0	0	0	0	NC†	NC†

‡Shared results with the other teams

† Ineligible for the position in the championship

=== Formula 4 UAE Championship ===
Year	Car	Drivers	Races	Wins	Poles	F.Laps	Podiums	Points	D.C.	T.C.
2023	Tatuus F4-T421	(Italy) Brando Badoer	9	0	0	1	1	69	6th	6th
2023	Tatuus F4-T421	(Philippines) Hiyu Yamakoshi	6	0	0	0	0	8	22nd	6th
2023	Tatuus F4-T421	(Australia) Jack Beeton	15	0	0	0	0	6	23rd	6th
2023	Tatuus F4-T421	(United Kingdom) Kai Daryanani	15	0	0	0	0	0	36th	6th

=== Formula Regional Middle East Championship ===
Year	Car	Drivers	Races	Wins	Poles	F.Laps	Podiums	Points	D.C.	T.C.
2023	Tatuus F.3 T-318	(Spain) Pepe Martí	12	2	0	0	2	79	7th	4th
2023	Tatuus F.3 T-318	(Mexico) Rafael Villagómez	12	0	0	0	1	44	13th	4th
2023	Tatuus F.3 T-318	(Thailand) Tasanapol Inthraphuvasak	14	0	0	0	1	19	19th	4th
2023	Tatuus F.3 T-318	(Netherlands) Niels Koolen	15	0	0	0	0	0	31st	4th
2023	Tatuus F.3 T-318	(Japan) Ayato Iwasaki	3	0	0	0	0	0	37th	4th

== Timeline ==
Current series
Italian Formula 4 Championship	2017–present
Formula Regional European Championship	2019–present
FIA Formula 2 Championship	2022–present
FIA Formula 3 Championship	2022–present
Euro 4 Championship	2023–present
Formula Regional Middle East Trophy	2023, 2026–present
Formula Winter Series	2024–present
Former series
Dutch and Benelux Formula Ford	1975–1996
German Formula Three Championship	1984, 1997–2002, 2004–2014
British Formula 3 International Series	1985, 1997, 2011
Formula Renault 2.0 Netherlands	2003–2005
Formula Renault Eurocup	2003, 2011
Formula Renault 2.0 Germany	2004–2005
Formula 3 Euro Series	2006, 2012
Formula Renault Northern European Cup	2006–2012
ADAC Formel Masters	2008–2009
FIA European Formula 3 Championship	2012–2018
Formula Renault 1.6 NEC	2013
ADAC Formula 4	2015–2022
Euroformula Open Championship	2020–2022
F4 Spanish Championship	2022–2025
Formula 4 UAE Championship	2023

== Notes ==
Achievements
Preceded by Prema Powerteam	Italian F4 Teams' Champion; 2021	Succeeded by Prema Powerteam
Preceded by US Racing-CHRS	ADAC Formula 4 Teams' Champion; 2020 - 2021	Succeeded by Prema Powerteam
