= Mari Boya =

Spanish racing driver (born 2004)

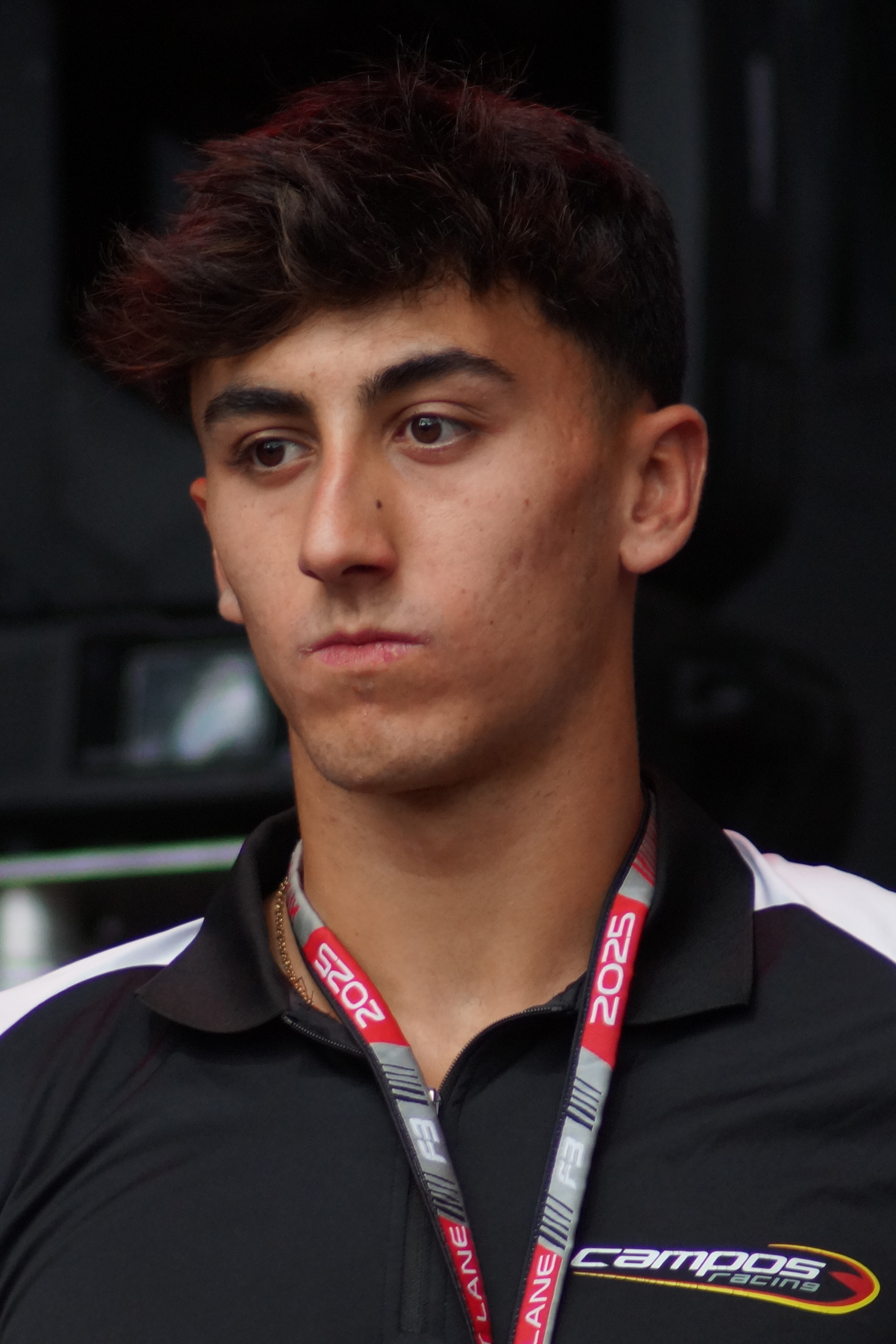
- Boya at the 2025 Barcelona Formula 3 round
- Nationality: (Spain) Spanish
- Born: José María Navalón Boya; 13 April 2004 (age 22) Les, Catalonia, Spain

FIA Formula 2 Championship career
- Debut season: 2026
- Current team: Prema Racing
- Categorisation: FIA Silver
- Car number: 12
- Starts: 18
- Wins: 0
- Podiums: 0
- Poles: 0
- Fastest laps: 0
- Best finish: TBD in 2026

Previous series
- 2023–2025; 2023–2024; 2023–2024; 2021-2022; 2020: FIA Formula 3; Eurocup-3; FR Middle East; FR European; F4 Spanish
- Statistics up to date as of 25 August 2026.

José María "Mari" Navalón Boya (Spanish pronunciation: [xoˌse maˈɾi.a naβaˈlom ˈboʝa]; born 13 April 2004) is a Spanish racing driver who competes in the FIA Formula 2 Championship for Prema Racing as part of the AMF1 Driver Development Programme.

Born in Les, Catalonia, Boya began single-seaters in 2020, finishing runner-up in Spanish F4 to Kas Haverkort. He moved up to the Formula Regional European Championship in 2021 and enjoyed sporadic success over two years. He then spent three seasons in the FIA Formula 3 Championship from 2023 to 2025, finishing third in the latter year with Campos. Boya also raced in the inaugural Eurocup-3 season in 2023, placing runner-up.

== Early and personal life ==
José María Navalón Boya was born on 13 April 2004 in Les, Catalonia. He is multilingual, fluent in Spanish, Catalan, Aranese, French, English and Italian. His racing hero is two-time Formula One world champion Fernando Alonso.

== Career ==
=== Karting career ===
Boya started competition karting in 2015, when he won the Spanish Karting Championship, and he repeated the same feat again in 2016. He won the championship again in 2018, this time in the Junior class, and came out victorious in the IAME Winter Cup that same year. The Spaniard stayed in karts until early 2020.

=== Formula 4 ===
Boya made his car racing debut in the 2020 F4 Spanish Championship with MP Motorsport. Boya had a strong opening two rounds on his debut, before taking his first win during the first Jerez race. He later took a double victory in Aragón. He won three races and scored fourteen podiums throughout the season, which meant Boya finished second in the drivers' standings behind fellow rookie and teammate Kas Haverkort.

=== Formula Regional ===
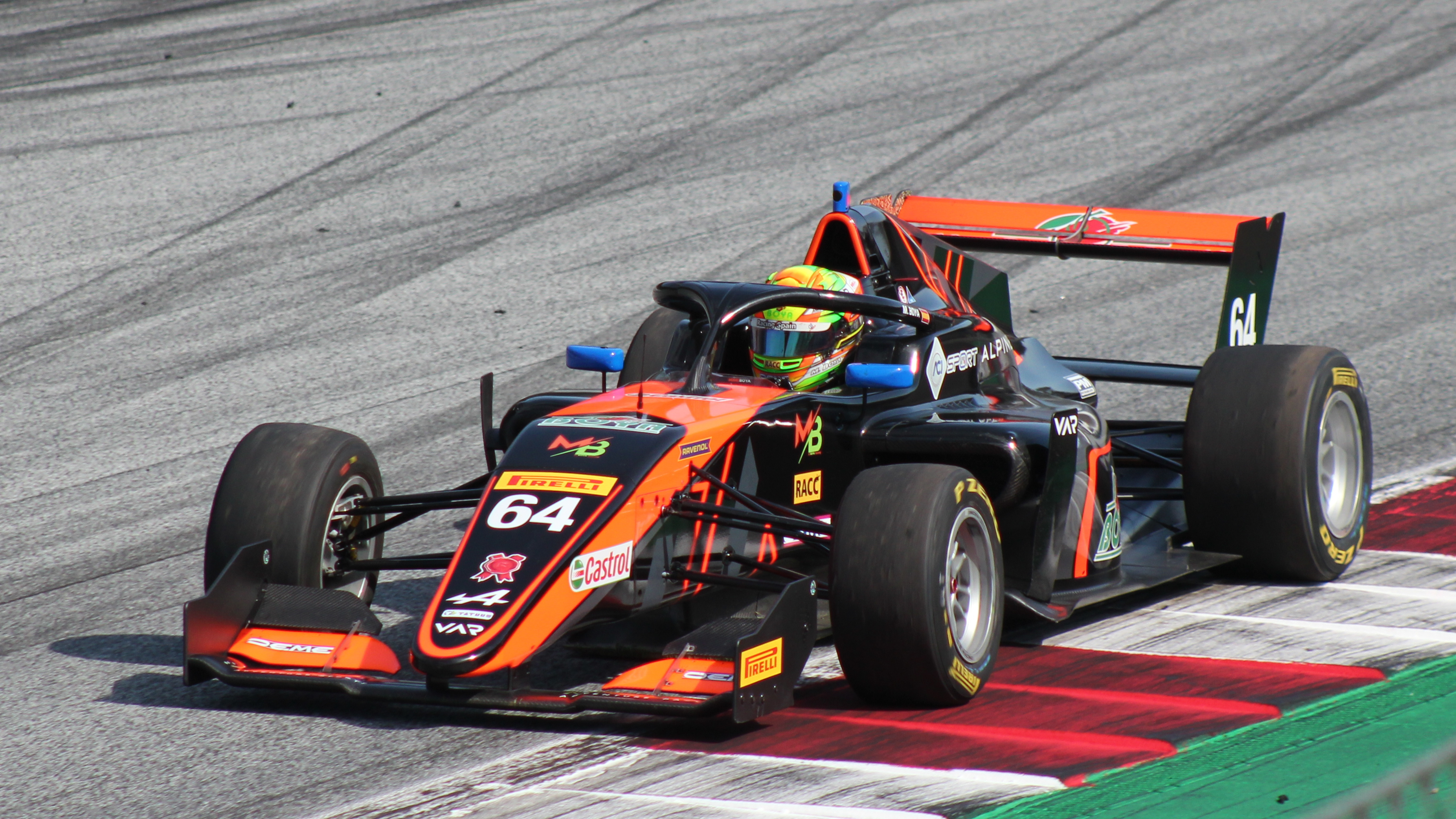
Boya racing in the 2021 Formula Regional European Championship at the Red Bull Ring.

==== 2021 ====
In April 2021, it was announced that Boya would be making his debut in the Formula Regional European Championship with Formula One World Champion Fernando Alonso's team, FA Racing. However at the last minute, he switched to Van Amersfoort Racing instead, partnering Francesco Pizzi and Lorenzo Fluxá. At the first round of the championship Boya scored five points, becoming the first driver to score points for the team that year. He score multiple points finishes in the first half of his campaign, but the main highlight of the season would be a third-placed podium in Valencia. This placed him 14th in the standings at the end of the season, with 51 points scored.

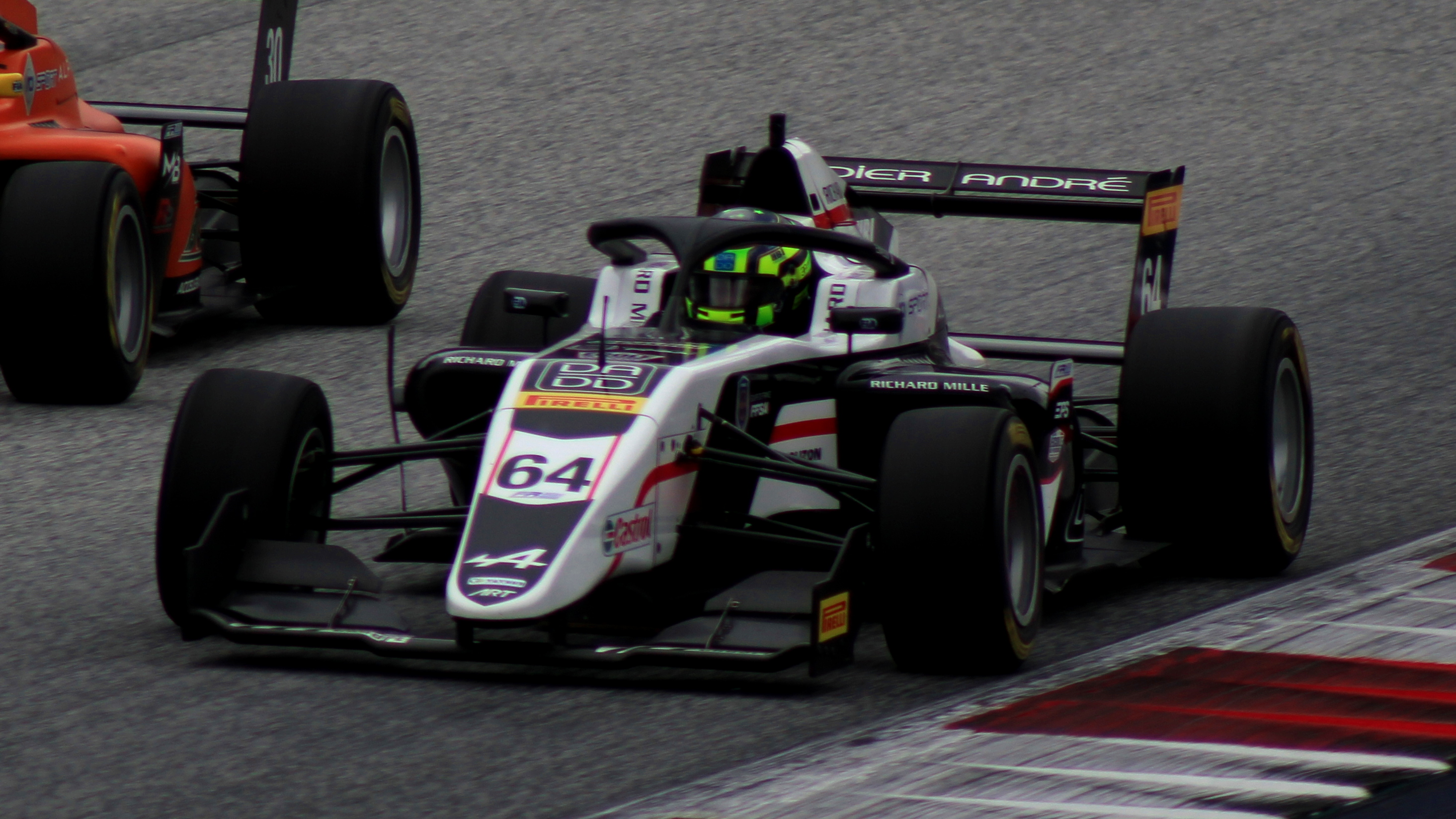
Boya racing in the 2022 Formula Regional European Championship at the Red Bull Ring.

==== 2022 ====
Boya joined ART Grand Prix for the 2022 Formula Regional European Championship alongside Laurens van Hoepen and Gabriele Minì. He scored a second place early on in Imola. However, after the sixth round at the Hungaroring, Boya was replaced by Esteban Masson at ART for unknown reasons. However, he was drafted to replace Michael Belov at MP Motorsport for the remainder of the season. This move would only bring two points in the remaining four rounds, as Boya limped to tenth in the standings.

==== 2023 ====
Boya raced the full season with MP Motorsport in the 2023 Formula Regional Middle East Championship. He took his first Formula Regional win during the third race of the Dubai opening round, and another win in the final round at Yas Marina boosted him to fifth in the standings.

==== 2024 ====
Boya returned to the Formula Regional Middle East Championship in 2024, driving for Pinnacle Motorsport. Boya did not win a race during the championship, but scored three podiums on his way to finishing fifth in the standings yet again.

In November, Boya competed in the Macau Grand Prix, again joining Pinnacle Motorsport. He qualified in fifth position; however, he stalled on the formation lap for the qualifying race and was required to start from the pitlane. During the race, he was shown the black disqualification flag for overtaking cars on the formation lap. Despite starting from the back of the grid, he avoided incidents to finish ninth in the final, and was promoted to seventh after the PHM Racing cars were disqualified.

=== Eurocup-3 ===
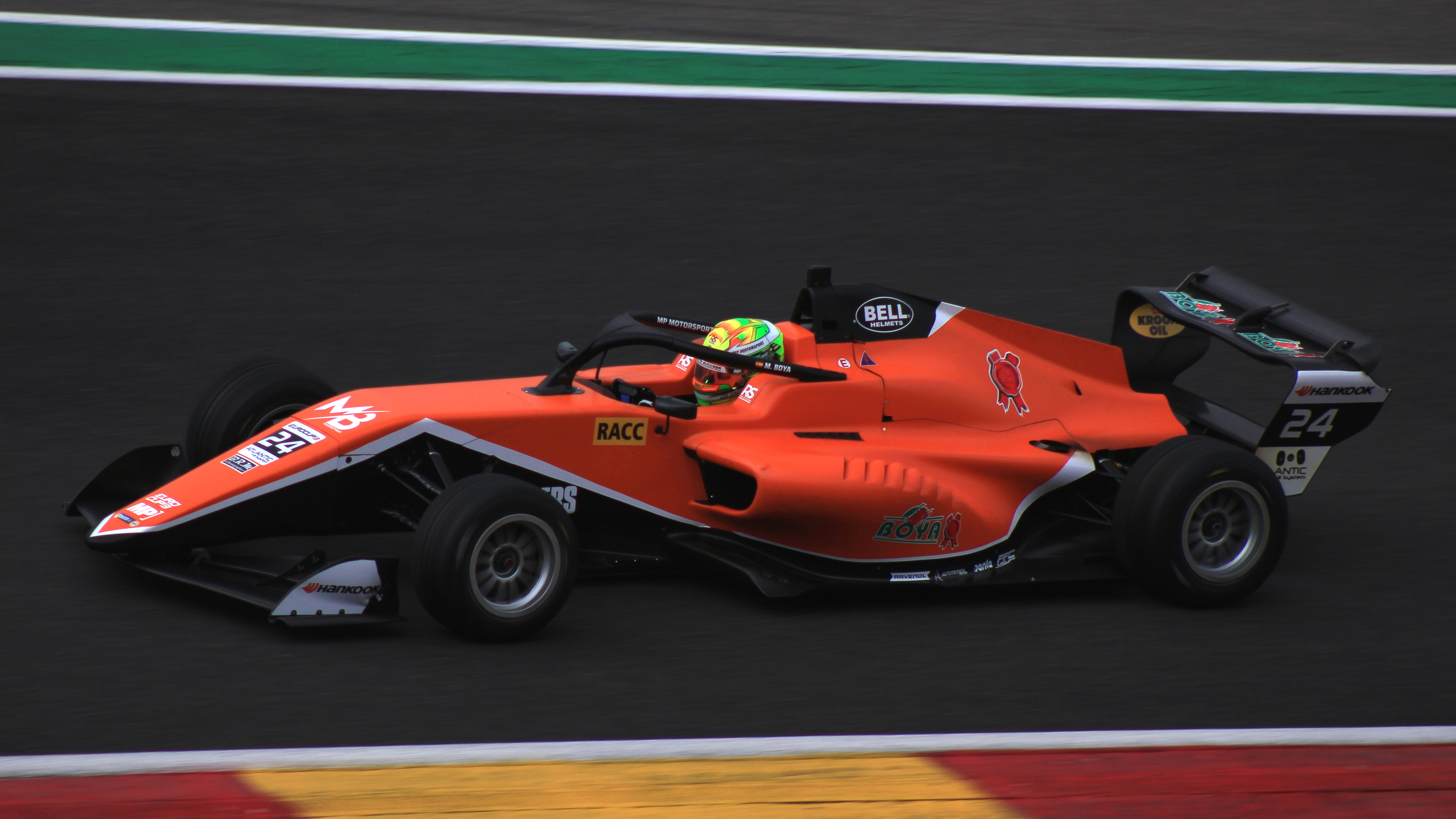
Boya racing in the 2023 Eurocup-3 season at the Spa-Francorchamps.

==== 2023 ====
In a last-minute signing, Boya announced that he would compete in the 2023 Eurocup-3 season with MP Motorsport, alongside his Formula 3 campaign. The Spaniard started with a double pole and a victory in Spa-Francorchamps, but was forced to miss the second round in Aragón due to clashing Formula 3 commitments. Despite that, he rebounded with a double win in Monza. However, Boya netted only one podium in the next two rounds, but managed to win again in Estoril. A win and a third-placed podium put Boya into the title fight with Esteban Masson heading into the Barcelona season finale. Being separated one point, Boya was unable to capitalise as he took a third and fourth place while Masson won both. This meant Boya finished runner-up, whilst earning five wins, nine podiums and 243 points.

==== 2024 ====
Boya returned to Eurocup-3 with GRS Team during the final round in Barcelona as a guest driver.

=== FIA Formula 3 Championship ===
==== 2023 ====
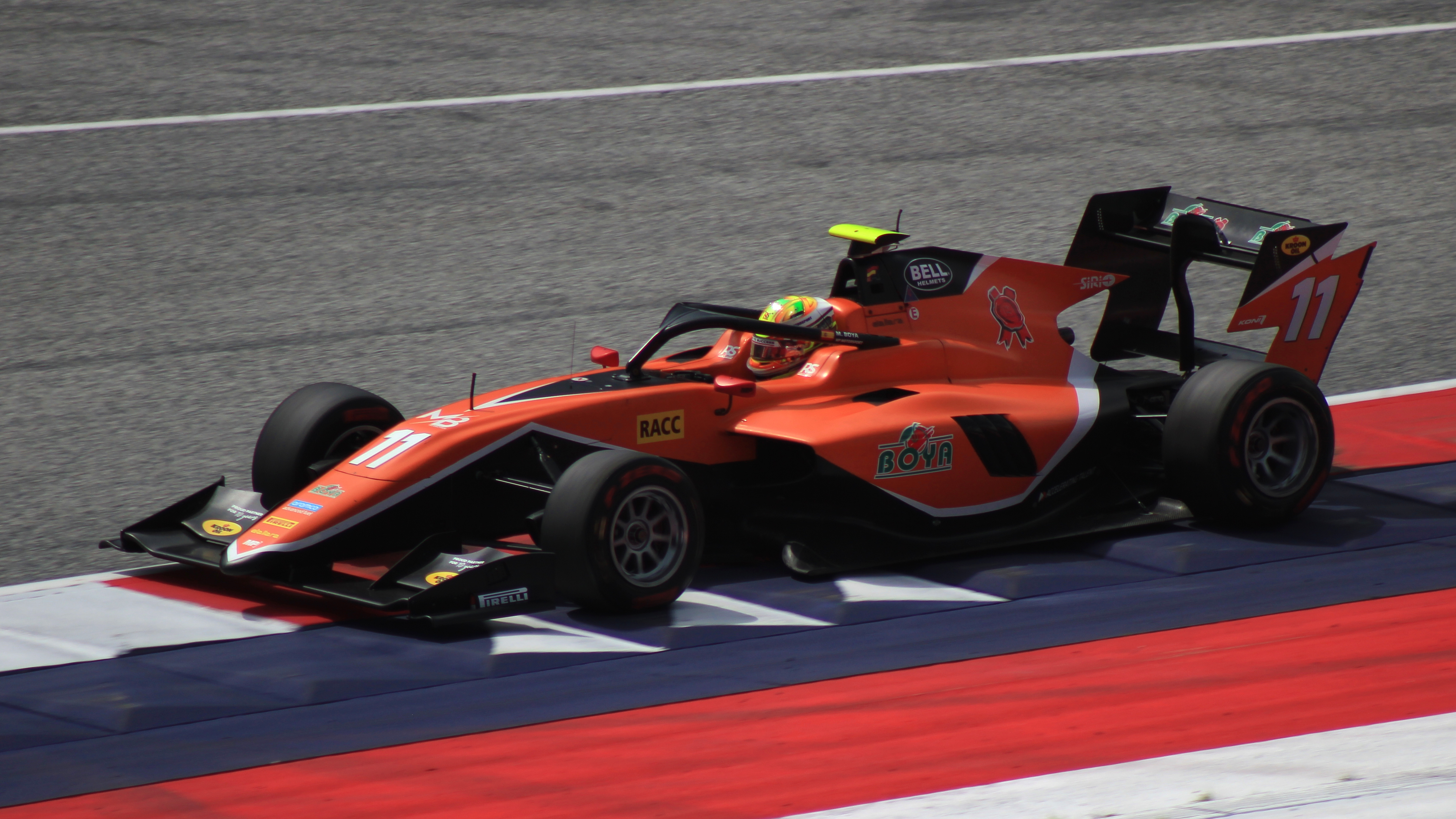
Boya driving the Dallara F3 2019 during the 2023 Spielberg Formula 3 round.

In September 2022, Boya drove for MP Motorsport during the FIA Formula 3 post-season test. Just two months later, the Dutch outfit confirmed Boya's signing for the 2023 FIA Formula 3 Championship. He later stated that his aim was to "quickly adapt and to take all the opportunities [I] have". Boya endured an atrocious start to his season, failing to score in the first three rounds, whilst retiring thrice. However, he banished his poor fortunes with a double points finish in sixth and seventh at Barcelona. He returned to the points in the Hungary feature race, having managed his tyres well. Boya's best weekend came at the Monza finale, having battled teammate Franco Colapinto for the lead, the Spaniard would lose second place to Gabriel Bortoleto on the last lap, but nevertheless scored his first podium. He followed this up with sixth in the feature, seeing him place 17th in the standings with 29 points.

Later in the year, Boya joined MP Motorsport again for the 2023 Macau Grand Prix. After qualifying in tenth, he rose to sixth in the qualifying race and then fourth in the final race.

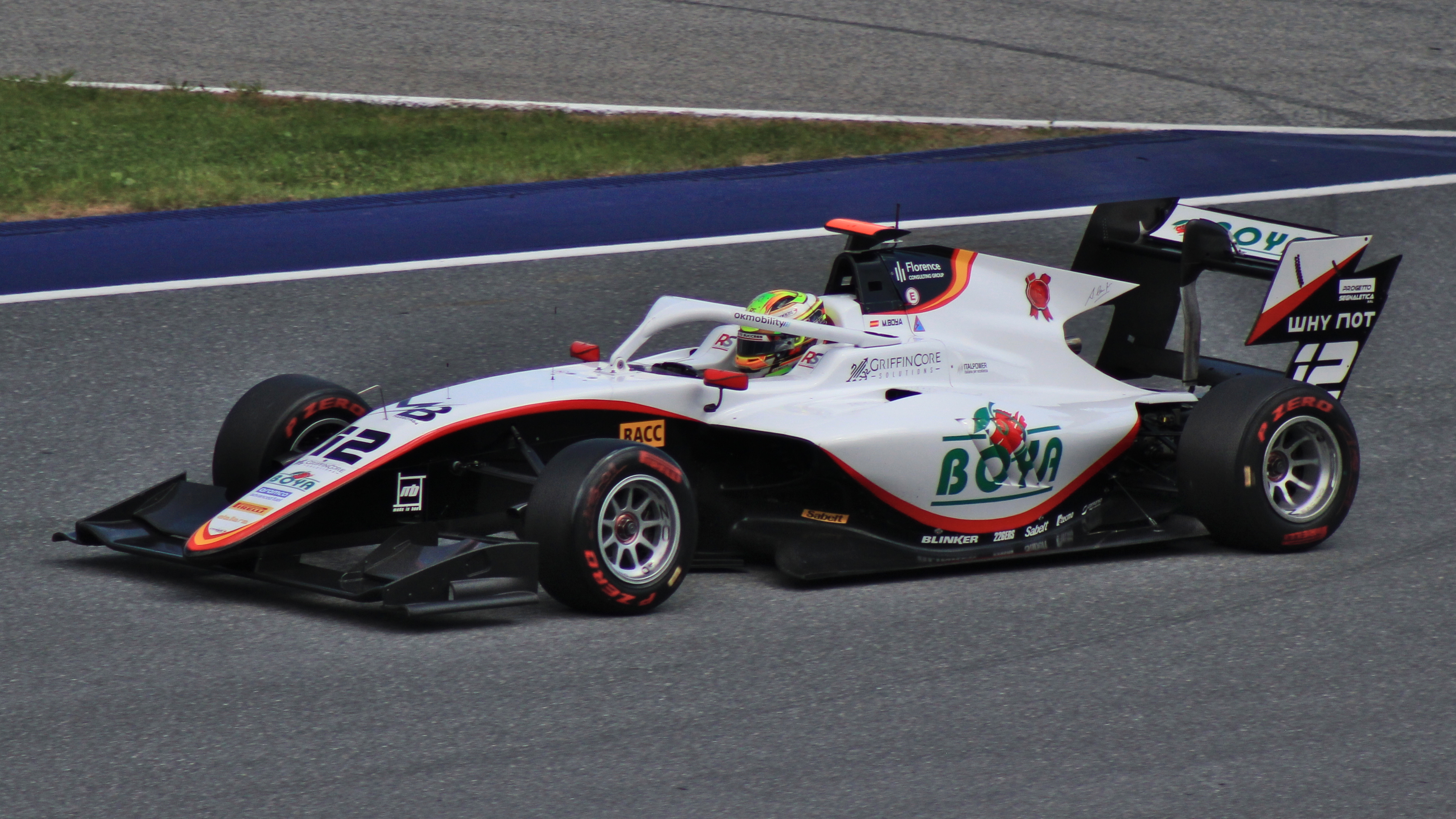
Boya driving for Campos Racing during the 2024 Spielberg Formula 3 round

==== 2024 ====
Boya switched to Campos Racing for his second season of Formula 3 in 2024, alongside Sebastián Montoya and Red Bull junior Oliver Goethe. He started the season with points in the sprint race with eighth, but sustained a puncture on the second lap during the feature race after contact with Laurens van Hoepen. Qualifying sixth in Melbourne, Boya made his way up the order and finished in an impressive fourth. He continued his good form in the feature with seventh. In Imola, Boya was taken out of the opening lap in the sprint race, but made up 18 positions in the feature race from 27th to finish ninth. A solid weekend in Monaco rewarded him with sixth and seventh place.

In the Barcelona sprint race, from third, Boya took advantage of a collision from the leading Trident cars. Despite a challenge from Alex Dunne, Boya persevered for his first F3 victory in his home race. He would finish eighth during the feature race, but was penalised due to track limits and dropped to 14th. However, this was followed by two rounds with no points owing to poor qualifying, until he scored a point again in the Budapest feature race. Boya survived a chaotic sprint race in Monza to take seventh place, his final points finish of the season, as he retired in the feature race after contact with teammate Montoya. The Spaniard finished his sophomore F3 campaign 15th in the standings with 45 points.

==== 2025 ====
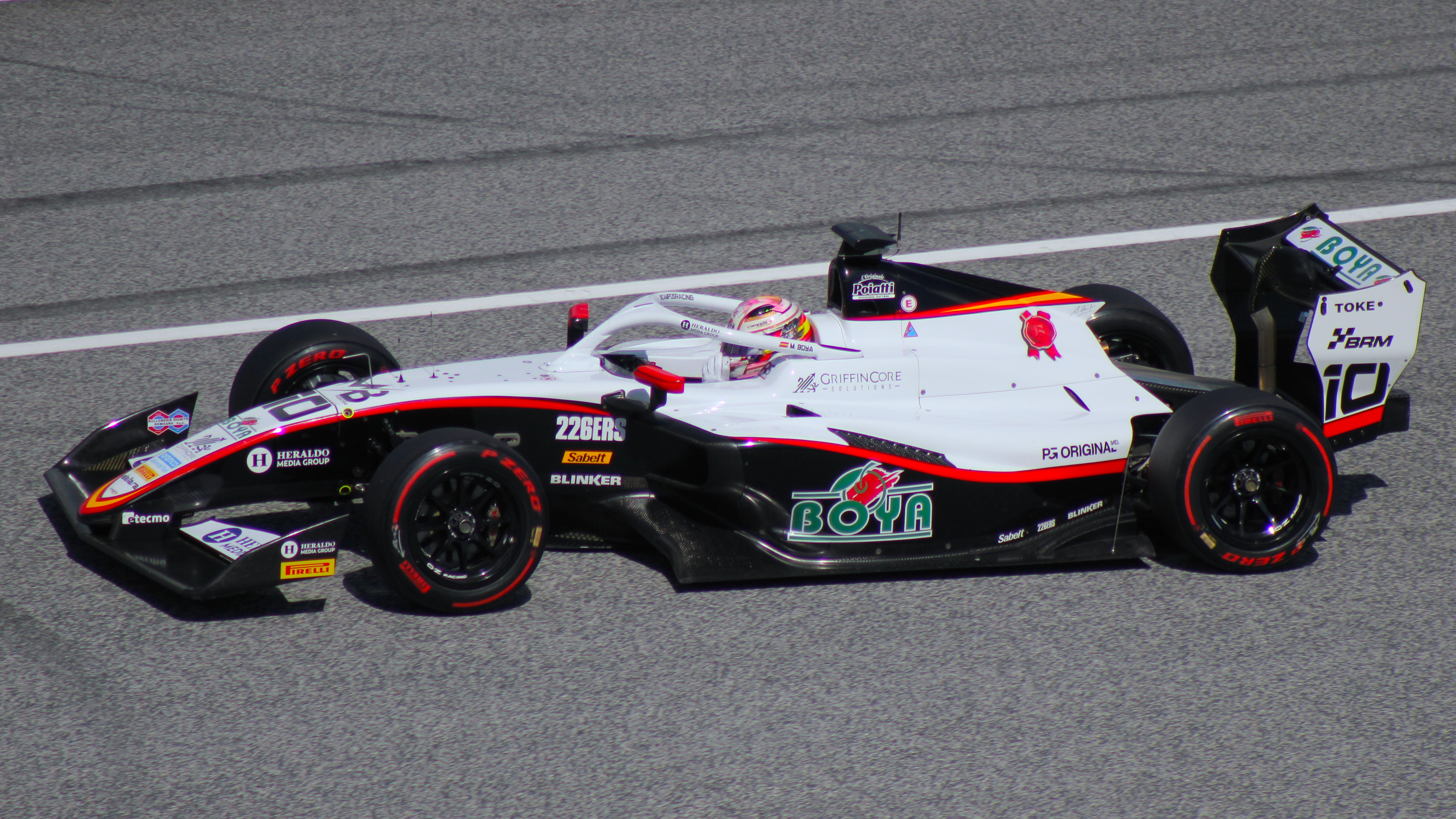
Boya driving the Dallara F3 2025 during the 2025 Spielberg Formula 3 round

Staying in the category for a third season, Boya continued with Campos Racing for the 2025 FIA Formula 3 season alongside Nikola Tsolov and Tasanapol Inthraphuvasak. The season began slowly; his first points of the season came in Bahrain where he finished eighth in the feature race from 20th, and he was on track for a podium in the Imola sprint race before retiring due to a mechanical issue. However, he proved his worth by making up positions the next day to finish in fifth. Things changed in Monaco, where a third place in qualifying led to his first feature race podium in F3. His home weekend in Barcelona was mixed; he made up positions from 15th to finish in seventh during the sprint, but a penalty stripped him of points on Sunday.

In Austria, Boya made comeback drives in both races having qualified 14th, he passed three drivers on the last lap to finish in sixth during the sprint; he finished fourth but was promoted the podium the next day after teammate Tsolov was disqualified. Silverstone proved to be a breakthrough for Boya, as a double pass on the penultimate lap earned Boya back-to-back podiums. Starting fourth in a damp feature race, Boya gambled on wets which proved to be the right choice, as he quickly made his way into the lead to take his first feature race win. He qualified second in Budapest. After a strong fightback rewarded him with seventh in the sprint, a second place finish in a wet feature moved him up to second in the standings. Despite starting down in 17th for the Monza finale, crucial points in both races secured Campos the title for the first time in history. Boya finished the season third in the standings, with one win and five podiums.

=== FIA Formula 2 Championship ===
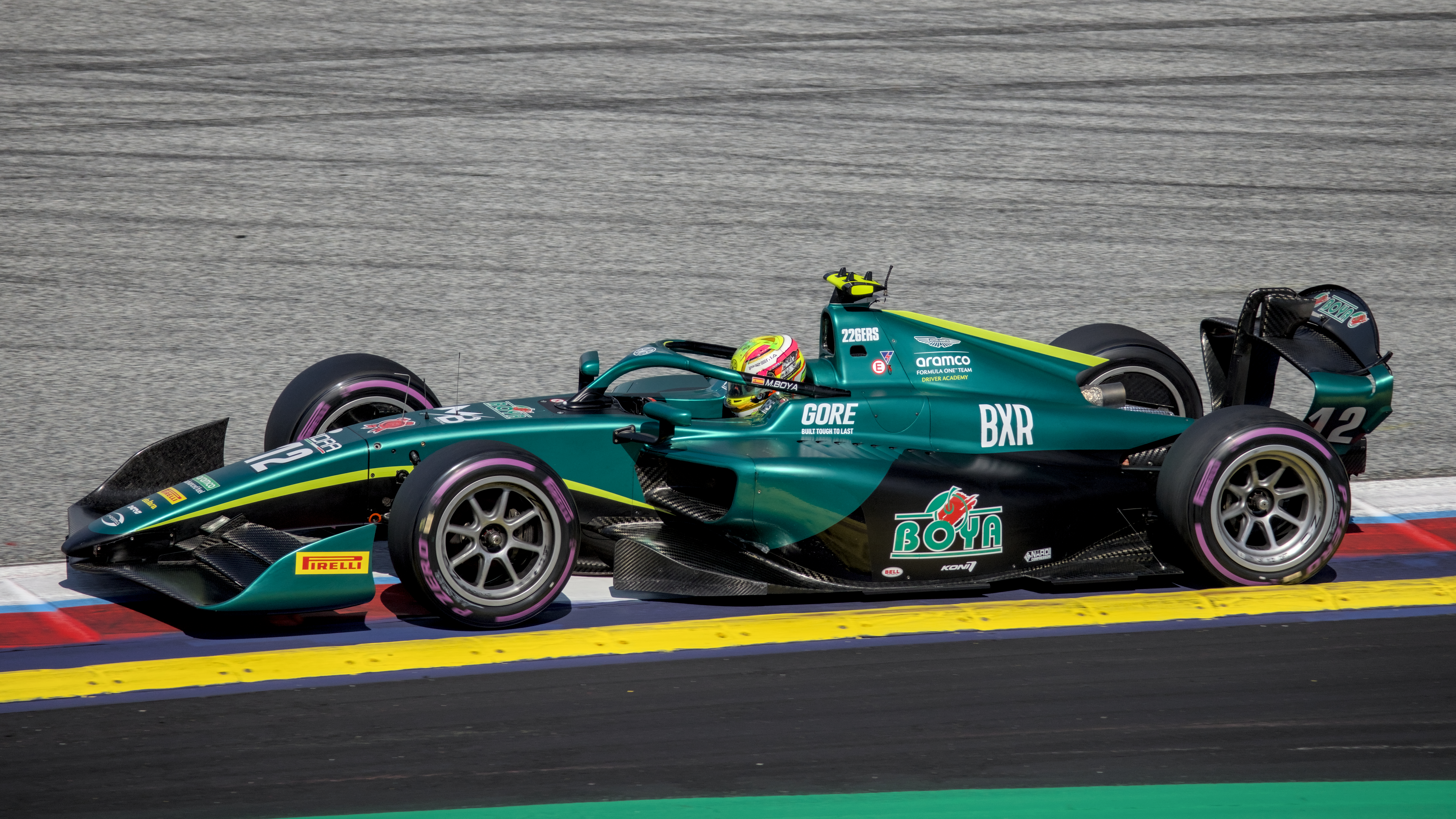
Boya driving the Dallara F2 2024 during the 2026 Spielberg Formula 2 round

Boya moved up to Formula 2 in 2026, joining Prema Racing.

=== Formula One ===
In 2025, Boya joined Aston Martin's driver academy.

=== Other racing ===
In April 2026, it was announced that Boya would be taking part in the first round of the 2026 GT World Challenge Europe Endurance Cup with Comtoyou Racing, alongside Roberto Merhi and Lance Stroll.

== Karting record ==
=== Karting career summary ===
| Season | Series | Team | Position |
|---|---|---|---|
| 2015 | Spanish Championship — Cadet | | 1st |
| 2015 | WSK Final Cup — 60 Mini | DPK Racing | 23rd |
| 2016 | Spanish Championship — Cadet | | 1st |
| 2016 | Rotax Max Challenge Grand Finals — Mini MAX | | 10th |
| 2017 | Spanish Championship — Junior | | 4th |
| 2017 | IAME International Final — X30 Junior | | 13th |
| 2017 | WSK Super Master Series — OKJ | VDK Racing | 34th |
| 2018 | IAME Euro Series — X30 Junior | | 5th |
| 2018 | Spanish Championship — Junior | | 1st |
| 2018 | WSK Super Master Series — OKJ | Baby Race Academy | 25th |
| 2018 | IAME Winter Cup — X30 Junior | Kids to Win | 1st |
| 2018 | WSK Champions Cup — OKJ | Kids to Win | 10th |
| 2019 | Spanish Championship — Senior | | 4th |
| 2019 | IAME International Final — X30 Senior | | DNF |
| 2019 | IAME Euro Series — X30 Senior | Monlau Competicion | 12th |
| 2019 | IAME Winter Cup — X30 Senior | Monlau Competicion | 6th |
| 2020 | IAME Winter Cup — X30 Senior | Monlau Competicion | 17th |
| 2021 | IAME Winter Cup — X30 Senior | Monlau Competicion | 7th |
| 2022 | IAME Winter Cup — X30 Senior | Monlau Competicion | 2nd |

== Racing record ==
=== Racing career summary ===
| Season | Series | Team | Races | Wins | Poles | F/Laps | Podiums | Points | Position |
|---|---|---|---|---|---|---|---|---|---|
| 2020 | F4 Spanish Championship | MP Motorsport | 21 | 3 | 3 | 4 | 14 | 272 | **2nd** |
| 2021 | Formula Regional European Championship | Van Amersfoort Racing | 20 | 0 | 0 | 0 | 1 | 51 | 14th |
| 2022 | Formula Regional European Championship | ART Grand Prix | 12 | 0 | 0 | 2 | 1 | 69 | 10th |
| 2022 | Formula Regional European Championship | MP Motorsport | 8 | 0 | 0 | 0 | 0 | 69 | 10th |
| 2023 | Formula Regional Middle East Championship | Hyderabad Blackbirds by MP | 15 | 2 | 0 | 2 | 3 | 107 | 5th |
| 2023 | FIA Formula 3 Championship | MP Motorsport | 18 | 0 | 0 | 0 | 1 | 29 | 17th |
| 2023 | Eurocup-3 | MP Motorsport | 16 | 5 | 5 | 4 | 9 | 243 | **2nd** |
| 2023 | Macau Grand Prix | MP Motorsport | 1 | 0 | 0 | 0 | 0 | —N/a | 4th |
| 2024 | Formula Regional Middle East Championship | Pinnacle Motorsport | 15 | 0 | 0 | 2 | 3 | 112 | 5th |
| 2024 | FIA Formula 3 Championship | Campos Racing | 20 | 1 | 0 | 0 | 1 | 45 | 15th |
| 2024 | Eurocup-3 | GRS Team | 2 | 0 | 0 | 0 | 0 | 0 | NC† |
| 2024 | Macau Grand Prix | KCMG IXO by Pinnacle Motorsport | 1 | 0 | 0 | 0 | 0 | —N/a | 7th |
| 2025 | FIA Formula 3 Championship | Campos Racing | 19 | 1 | 0 | 1 | 5 | 116 | **3rd** |
| 2025 | Macau Grand Prix | KCMG Enya Pinnacle Motorsport | 1 | 0 | 0 | 0 | 1 | —N/a | **2nd** |
| 2026 | FIA Formula 2 Championship | Prema Racing | 8 | 0 | 0 | 0 | 0 | 10 | 20th* |
| 2026 | GT World Challenge Europe Endurance Cup | Comtoyou Racing | | | | | | | |

* Season still in progress.

=== Complete F4 Spanish Championship results ===
(key) (Races in bold indicate pole position) (Races in italics indicate fastest lap)

| Year | Team | 1 | 2 | 3 | 4 | 5 | 6 | 7 | 8 | 9 | 10 | 11 | 12 | 13 | 14 | 15 | 16 | 17 | 18 | 19 | 20 | 21 | DC | Points |
|---|---|---|---|---|---|---|---|---|---|---|---|---|---|---|---|---|---|---|---|---|---|---|---|---|
| 2020 | MP Motorsport | NAV; 1; 2 | NAV; 2; 9 | NAV; 3; 4 | LEC; 1; 3 | LEC; 2; 2 | **LEC**; **3**; 3 | JER; 1; 1 | JER; 2; 18 | JER; 3; 2 | CRT; 1; 7 | CRT; 2; 4 | CRT; 3; 2 | **ARA**; **1**; 1 | **ARA**; **2**; 1 | ARA; 3; 3 | JAR; 1; 3 | JAR; 2; 11 | JAR; 3; 4 | CAT; 1; 3 | CAT; 2; 3 | CAT; 3; 3 | 2nd | 272 |

=== Complete Formula Regional European Championship results ===
(key) (Races in bold indicate pole position) (Races in italics indicate fastest lap)

| Year | Team | 1 | 2 | 3 | 4 | 5 | 6 | 7 | 8 | 9 | 10 | 11 | 12 | 13 | 14 | 15 | 16 | 17 | 18 | 19 | 20 | DC | Points |
|---|---|---|---|---|---|---|---|---|---|---|---|---|---|---|---|---|---|---|---|---|---|---|---|
| 2021 | Van Amersfoort Racing | IMO; 1; 10 | IMO; 2; 8 | CAT; 1; 5 | CAT; 2; 19 | MCO; 1; 9 | MCO; 2; 8 | LEC; 1 Ret | LEC; 2; 31 | ZAN; 1; 7 | ZAN; 2; 9 | SPA; 1; 11 | SPA; 2; 13 | RBR; 1; 10 | RBR; 2; 14 | VAL; 1; 3 | VAL; 2; 7 | MUG; 1 Ret | MUG; 2; 12 | MNZ; 1 Ret | MNZ; 2; 12 | 14th | 51 |
| 2022 | ART Grand Prix | MNZ; 1; 7 | MNZ; 2; 6 | IMO; 1; 2 | IMO; 2; 21 | MCO; 1; 7 | MCO; 2; 7 | LEC; 1; 7 | LEC; 2; 7 | ZAN; 1; 5 | ZAN; 2; 12 | HUN; 1; 12 | HUN; 2; 14 | | | | | | | | | 10th | 69 |
| 2022 | MP Motorsport | | | | | | | | | | | | | SPA; 1; 13 | SPA; 2; 10 | RBR; 1; 10 | RBR; 2 Ret | CAT; 1; 25 | CAT; 2; 29 | MUG; 1; 17 | MUG; 2; 12 | 10th | 69 |

=== Complete Formula Regional Middle East Championship results ===
(key) (Races in bold indicate pole position) (Races in italics indicate fastest lap)

| Year | Entrant | 1 | 2 | 3 | 4 | 5 | 6 | 7 | 8 | 9 | 10 | 11 | 12 | 13 | 14 | 15 | DC | Points |
|---|---|---|---|---|---|---|---|---|---|---|---|---|---|---|---|---|---|---|
| 2023 | Hyderabad Blackbirds by MP | DUB1; 1; 12 | DUB1; 2; 13 | DUB1; 3; 1 | KUW1; 1 Ret | KUW1; 2; 14 | KUW1; 3; 13 | KUW2; 1; 3 | KUW2; 2; 4 | KUW2; 3; 10 | DUB2; 1; 6 | DUB2; 2; 5 | DUB2; 3; 6 | ABU; 1; 1 | ABU; 2; 10 | ABU; 3; 18 | 5th | 107 |
| 2024 | Pinnacle Motorsport | YMC1; 1; 6 | YMC1; 2; 7 | YMC1; 3; 5 | YMC2; 1; 3 | YMC2; 2; 3 | YMC2; 3; 26† | DUB1; 1; 3 | DUB1; 2; 6 | DUB1; 3 Ret | YMC3; 1 NC | YMC3; 2; 10 | YMC3; 3; 4 | DUB2; 1; 7 | DUB2; 2; 7 | DUB2; 3; 5 | 5th | 112 |

=== Complete Macau Grand Prix results ===
| Year | Team | Car | Qualifying | Quali Race | Main race |
|---|---|---|---|---|---|
| 2023 | (Netherlands) MP Motorsport | Dallara F3 2019 | 10th | 6th | 4th |
| 2024 | (Republic of Ireland) KCMG IXO by Pinnacle Motorsport | Tatuus F3 T-318 | 5th | DSQ | 7th |
| 2025 | (Republic of Ireland) KCMG Enya Pinnacle Motorsport | Tatuus F3 T-318 | 6th | 2nd | **2nd** |

=== Complete FIA Formula 3 Championship results ===
(key) (Races in bold indicate pole position) (Races in italics indicate fastest lap)

| Year | Entrant | 1 | 2 | 3 | 4 | 5 | 6 | 7 | 8 | 9 | 10 | 11 | 12 | 13 | 14 | 15 | 16 | 17 | 18 | 19 | 20 | DC | Points |
|---|---|---|---|---|---|---|---|---|---|---|---|---|---|---|---|---|---|---|---|---|---|---|---|
| 2023 | MP Motorsport | BHR; SPR; 15 | BHR; FEA; Ret | MEL; SPR; DSQ | MEL; FEA; Ret | MON; SPR; Ret | MON; FEA; 18 | CAT; SPR; 7 | CAT; FEA; 6 | RBR; SPR; 12 | RBR; FEA; 24 | SIL; SPR; 29 | SIL; FEA; 12 | HUN; SPR; 21 | HUN; FEA; 10 | SPA; SPR; 16 | SPA; FEA; 13 | MNZ; SPR; 3 | MNZ; FEA; 6 | | | 17th | 29 |
| 2024 | Campos Racing | BHR; SPR; 8 | BHR; FEA; 29 | MEL; SPR; 4 | MEL; FEA; 7 | IMO; SPR; Ret | IMO; FEA; 9 | MON; SPR; 6 | MON; FEA; 7 | CAT; SPR; 1 | CAT; FEA; 14 | RBR; SPR; 22 | RBR; FEA; 18 | SIL; SPR; 16 | SIL; FEA; 23 | HUN; SPR; 18 | HUN; FEA; 10 | SPA; SPR; 28 | SPA; FEA; Ret | MNZ; SPR; 7 | MNZ; FEA; Ret | 15th | 45 |
| 2025 | Campos Racing | MEL; SPR; 13 | MEL; FEA; 17 | BHR; SPR; 15 | BHR; FEA; 8 | IMO; SPR; Ret | IMO; FEA; 5 | MON; SPR; 8 | MON; FEA; 3 | CAT; SPR; 7 | CAT; FEA; 22 | RBR; SPR; 5 | RBR; FEA; 3 | SIL; SPR; 3 | SIL; FEA; 1 | SPA; SPR; 14 | SPA; FEA; C | HUN; SPR; 7 | HUN; FEA; 2 | MNZ; SPR; 5 | MNZ; FEA; 9 | 3rd | 116 |

=== Complete Eurocup-3 results ===
(key) (Races in bold indicate pole position) (Races in italics indicate fastest lap)

| Year | Team | 1 | 2 | 3 | 4 | 5 | 6 | 7 | 8 | 9 | 10 | 11 | 12 | 13 | 14 | 15 | 16 | 17 | DC | Points |
|---|---|---|---|---|---|---|---|---|---|---|---|---|---|---|---|---|---|---|---|---|
| 2023 | MP Motorsport | **SPA**; **1**; 4 | **SPA**; **2**; 1 | ARA; 1 WD | ARA; 2 WD | **MNZ**; **1**; 1 | MNZ; 2; 1 | ZAN; 1; 10 | **ZAN**; **1**; 2 | JER; 1; 8 | JER; 2; 4 | EST; 1; 3 | EST; 2; 1 | CRT; 1; 3 | **CRT**; **2**; 1 | CAT; 1; 3 | CAT; 2; 4 | | 2nd | 243 |
| 2024 | GRS Team | SPA; 1 | SPA; 2 | RBR; 1 | RBR; 2 | POR; 1 | POR; 2 | POR; 3 | LEC; 1 | LEC; 2 | ZAN; 1 | ZAN; 2 | ARA; 1 | ARA; 2 | JER; 1 | JER; 2 | CAT; 1; 15 | CAT; 2; 5 | NC† | 0 |

^{†} As Boya was a guest driver, he was ineligible to score points.

=== Complete FIA Formula 2 Championship results ===
(key) (Races in bold indicate pole position) (Races in italics indicate fastest lap)

| Year | Entrant | 1 | 2 | 3 | 4 | 5 | 6 | 7 | 8 | 9 | 10 | 11 | 12 | 13 | 14 | 15 | 16 | 17 | 18 | 19 | 20 | 21 | 22 | 23 | 24 | 25 | 26 | 27 | 28 | 29 | DC | Points |
|---|---|---|---|---|---|---|---|---|---|---|---|---|---|---|---|---|---|---|---|---|---|---|---|---|---|---|---|---|---|---|---|---|
| 2026 | Prema Racing | MEL; SPR; Ret | MEL; FEA; 13 | MIA; SPR; 17 | MIA; FEA; 7 | MTL; SPR; 15 | MTL; FEA; 8 | MON; SPR; 14 | MON; FEA; 16 | CAT; SPR; 15 | CAT; FEA; 21 | RBR; SPR; 11 | RBR; FEA; Ret | SIL; SPR; 13 | SIL; FEA; 15 | SPA; SPR; 11 | SPA; FEA; 9 | HUN; SPR; 17 | HUN; FEA; 15 | MNZ; SPR; 13 | MNZ; FEA; 13 | MAD; SPR; 8 | MAD; FEA; 11 | BAK; SPR; Ret | BAK; FEA1; Ret | BAK; FEA2; 6 | LSL; SPR | LSL; FEA | YMC; SPR | YMC; FEA | 20th* | 21* |

* Season still in progress.

=== Complete GT World Challenge Europe results ===
==== GT World Challenge Europe Endurance Cup ====
| Year | Team | Car | Class | 1 | 2 | 3 | 4 | 5 | 6 | 7 | Pos. | Points |
|---|---|---|---|---|---|---|---|---|---|---|---|---|
| 2026 | Comtoyou Racing | Aston Martin Vantage AMR GT3 Evo | Pro | LEC; 48† | MNZ | SPA; 6H | SPA; 12H | SPA; 24H | NÜR | POR | NC* | 0* |
