= Etienne van der Linde =

South African racing driver (born 1978)

- Nationality: (South Africa) South African
- Born: 25 February 1978 (age 48) Johannesburg, South Africa
- Relatives: Kelvin van der Linde (nephew); Sheldon van der Linde (nephew)

Etienne van der Linde (born 25 February 1978 in Johannesburg) is a South African racing driver. He has competed in such series as Euro Formula 3000 and the German Formula Three Championship. Late in his career, he also competed with BMW in the South Africa-based Bridgestone Production Car Championship.

Van der Linde is the uncle of sports car drivers Kelvin and Sheldon.
