= Arvid Lindblad =

British and Swedish racing driver (born 2007)

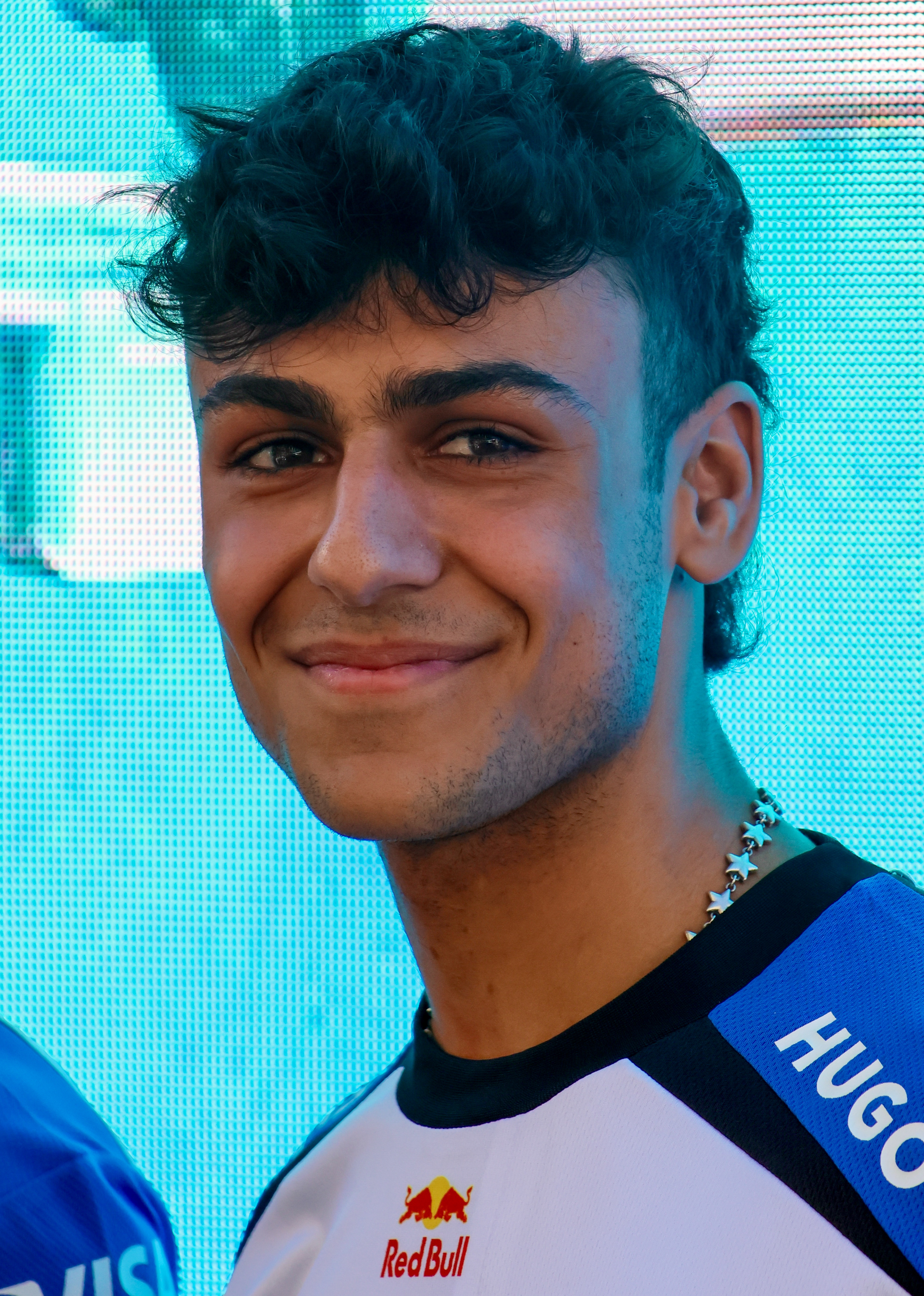
- Lindblad at the 2026 Australian Grand Prix
- Born: Arvid Anand Olof Lindblad; 8 August 2007 (age 19); Virginia Water, Surrey, England

Formula One World Championship career
- Nationality: (United Kingdom) British
- 2026 team: Racing Bulls-Red Bull Ford
- Car number: 41
- Entries: 20 (19 starts)
- Championships: 0
- Wins: 0
- Podiums: 0
- Career points: 38
- Pole positions: 0
- Fastest laps: 0
- First entry: 2026 Australian Grand Prix
- Last entry: 2026 São Paulo Grand Prix

Previous series
- 2025; 2025; 2024; 2024; 2023; 2023; 2022–2023: FIA Formula 2; FR Oceania; FIA Formula 3; FR Middle East; Euro 4; F4 UAE; Italian F4

Championship titles
- 2025; 2023: FR Oceania; Macau F4 Race

Arvid Anand Olof Lindblad (Swedish: [ˈǎrːvɪd anɑːnd ˈûːlɔf ˈlɪnːdˌblɑːd]; born 8 August 2007) is a British and Swedish racing driver who competes in Formula One for Racing Bulls under a British flag.

Born and raised in Virginia Water to a Swedish father and a British Indian mother, Lindblad began competitive kart racing aged seven, winning several continental titles before graduating to junior formulae in 2022. A protégé of 2024–25 Formula E World Champion Oliver Rowland, Lindblad contested Italian F4 until 2023, when he finished third overall with Prema. After winning the Macau F4 Race, Lindblad progressed to FIA Formula 3 in 2024, achieving several wins and placing fourth, before winning his maiden title in Formula Regional Oceania with M2. He advanced to FIA Formula 2 with Campos in 2025, becoming the youngest race-winner in Formula Two history.

A member of the Red Bull Junior Team since 2021, (Note: Lindblad joined the Red Bull Junior Team in 2021 as a Red Bull–supported driver before becoming a full member when he made his Formula 4 debut in 2022.) Lindblad debuted in Formula One with Racing Bulls at the Australian Grand Prix in 2026, aged 18. Lindblad is contracted to remain at Racing Bulls until at least the end of the 2027 season.

== Early life ==
Arvid Anand Olof Lindblad was born on 8 August 2007 in Virginia Water, Surrey, England. His father, Stefan Lindblad, is Swedish and grew up in a working-class family in Småland, while his mother, Anita (née Ahuja), is British Indian; his maternal grandparents were born in the Punjab region of India before its partition into Pakistan in 1947, fleeing to Delhi and later settling in England as doctors in the 1970s. He has stated that he is "very proud of [his] heritage", which "shaped who [he is]", and that he is additionally "very proud to be British". His parents both worked in finance in the City of London and later started their own businesses.

Lindblad was raised in Virginia Water, alongside his younger brother, and educated at the Royal Grammar School in Guildford until he moved into home-schooling aged 15. He was a straight-A student, completing A-levels in mathematics and chemistry, telling The Independent in 2026 that he prefers STEM subjects due to his dyslexia and he "tried to mix both [racing and education], which [helped him] become who [he is] today". He was diagnosed with coeliac disease when he was 13, which hindered his growth. His involvement in motorsport began when he was given a motocross bike aged three, a discipline his father contested at a young age. His weekends spent with grandparents in Bolton resulted in frequent visits to Hooton Park Circuit in Birkenhead. He used sim racing to account for missed track time.

== Junior racing career ==
=== Karting (2015–2022) ===
Lindblad first started karting aged five at Daytona Sandown Park in Esher. He progressed to competitive kart racing in 2015. Aged nine, Lindblad was taken under the wing of Oliver Rowland. In 2020 he won the WSK Super Master Series in the OKJ class. Signing to the Red Bull Junior Team in 2021, he won the WSK Euro Series and the WSK Final Cup for OK karts. He moved to shifter karting in 2022. A major accident occurred during the Champions of the Future Winter Series kart race where he crashed out during qualifying heat due to contact and suffered a broken thumb and extensive tissue damage.

=== Formula 4 (2022–2023) ===
==== 2022: Junior formulae debut ====
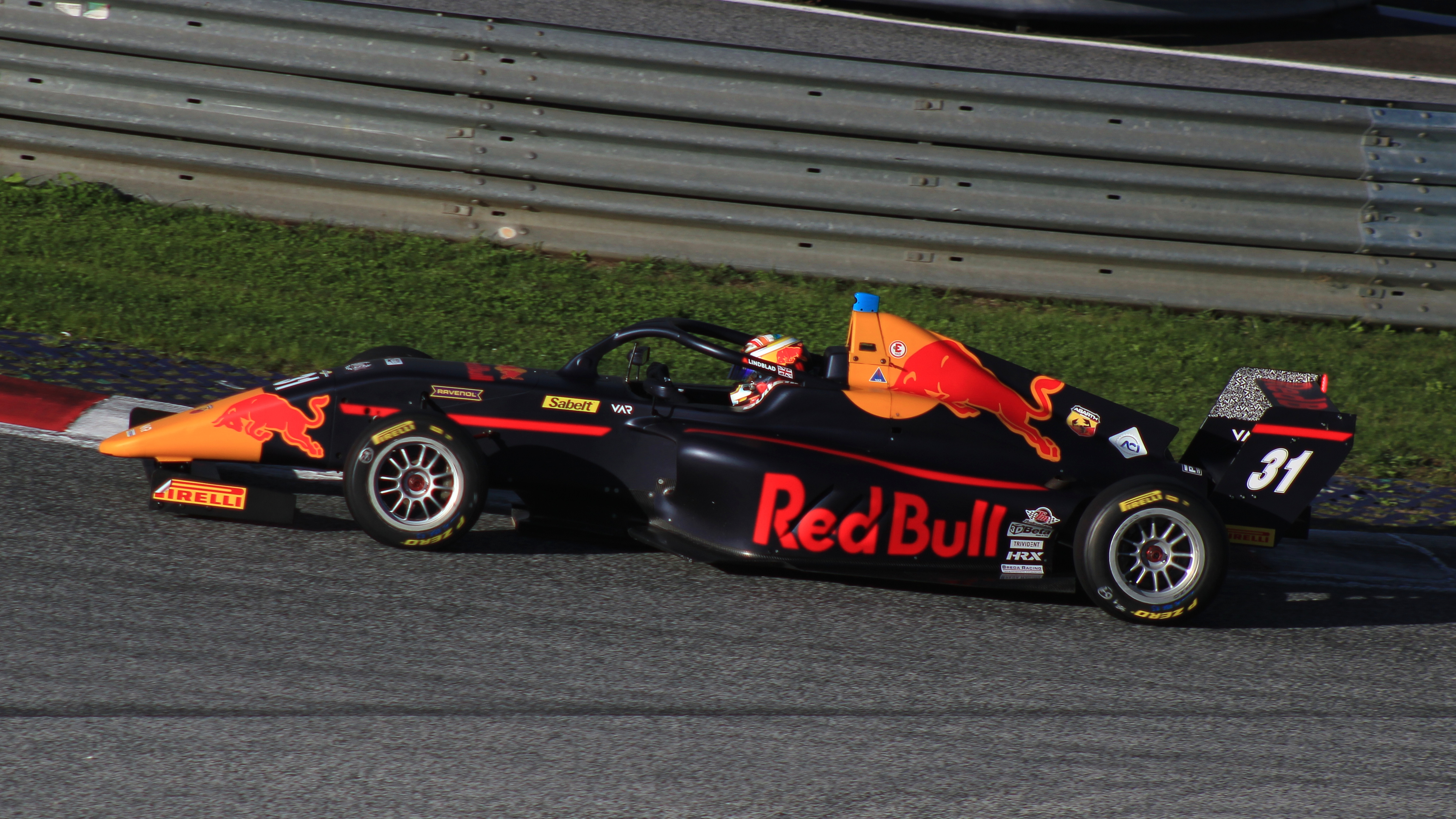
Lindblad driving in the 2022 Italian F4 Championship at the Red Bull Ring

In 2022, Lindblad made his debut single-seater racing by joining Van Amersfoort Racing ahead of the fifth round of the Italian F4 Championship after testing outside of race weekends throughout the year. He was able to amass three points finishes with his best finish being seventh place, putting him 17th in the standings with twelve points.

==== 2023: Maiden victories ====
Ahead of the season, Lindblad joined Hitech Grand Prix to compete in the Formula 4 UAE Championship. In race 3 of the opening round held at the Dubai Autodrome, Lindblad took his first Formula 4 win as he fended off Ferrari Driver Academy driver Tuukka Taponen from pole position. However, this proved a false dawn as Lindblad only scored 26 points in the following two rounds, which dropped him out of the hunt. Despite this, Lindblad notched up a podium during the season finale in Yas Marina, putting him fifth in the standings.

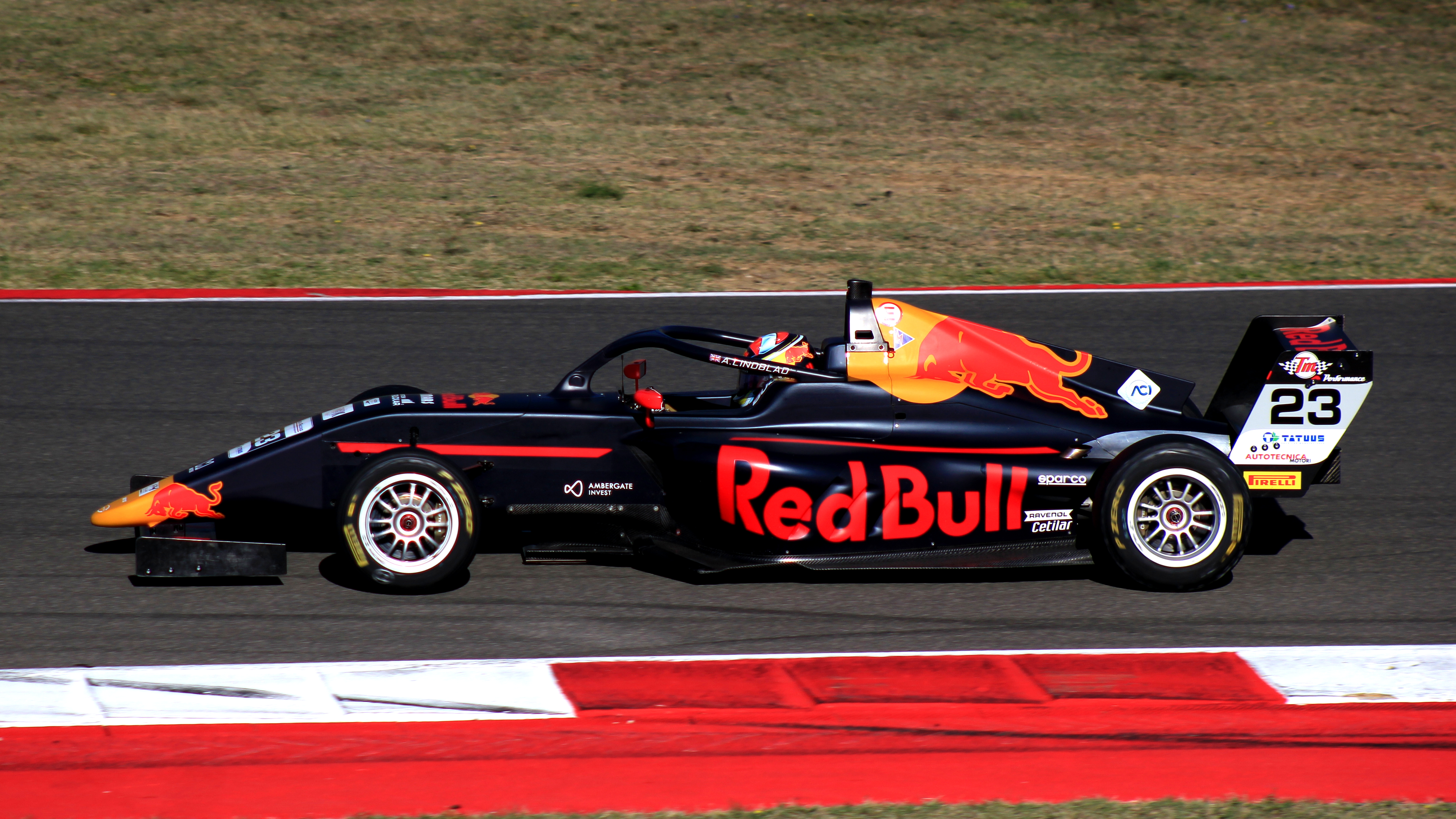
Lindblad driving in the 2023 Italian F4 Championship at Mugello Circuit

For his main campaign in Italian F4, Lindblad joined Prema Racing. He got off to a great start, taking his first win during the Imola opener inclusive of two other podiums. He then proceeded to secure a double win in Misano. An impressive feat followed after winning all three races at Monza Circuit he opened up his championship lead to over 80 points. However during the final three rounds, his Prema machinery began to struggle with a lack of pace, leading to Lindblad not even taking a podium finish. This allowed rivals Kacper Sztuka and teammate Ugo Ugochukwu to overhaul him in the standings, leading Lindblad to finish third in the standings.

In the Euro 4 Championship, Lindblad had a solid start as he secured pole for the opening Mugello round, where he went on to finish fourth. He then went on to take his only Euro 4 win during the last race in Monza, and another podium in Barcelona lifted him to fourth in the overall standings.

In November, Lindblad joined Prema to compete in the Formula 4 South East Asia Championship round at the Macau Grand Prix Circuit. In a chaotic qualifying, Lindblad was able to secure pole position, before following it up by winning the qualification race. His dominance continued the next day, where Lindblad was able to pull away and take home the victory in the main race. Lindblad's overall performances netted him as a finalist in the Aston Martin Autosport BRDC Award alongside Taylor Barnard, Callum Voisin and Joseph Loake.

=== Formula Three (2024–2025) ===
==== 2024: Rise to prominence in F3 ====
In the pre-season of 2024, Lindblad signed with Mumbai Falcons to participate in the first three rounds of the Formula Regional Middle East Championship. He impressed in the opening round in Yas Marina by winning the second race from reverse pole. Although he only scored three more points in the remaining two rounds, his performances placed him thirteenth overall in the standings.

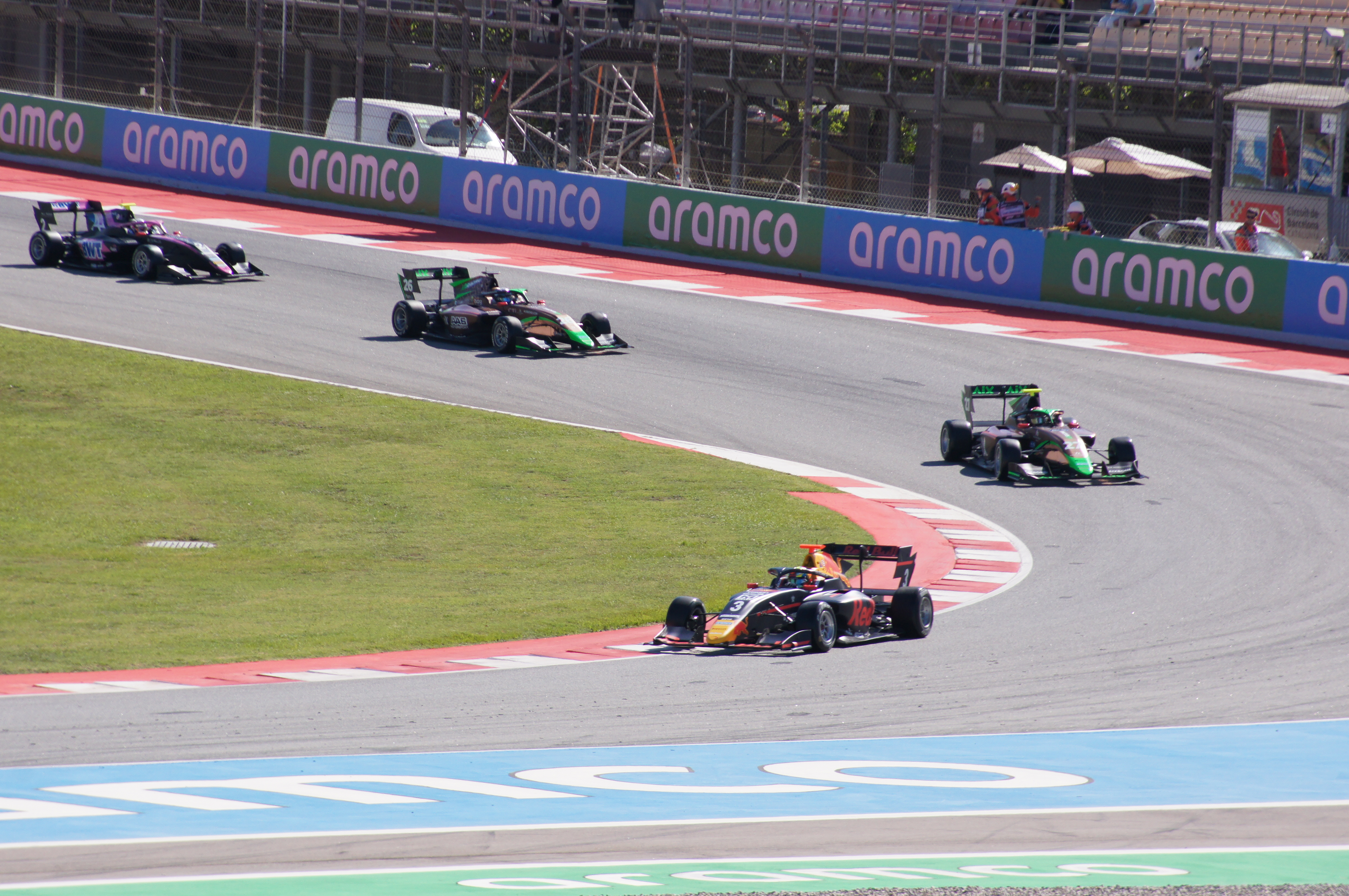
Lindblad (pictured at Barcelona) progressed to FIA Formula 3 in 2024 with Prema.

In October 2023, Lindblad signed to race with Prema Racing in the FIA Formula 3 Championship for 2024, partnering single-seater champions Gabriele Minì and Dino Beganovic. Qualifying ninth in Bahrain, Lindblad got off to a great start by winning the sprint race, where he managed his tyres early on before dispatching his rivals in the closing laps and crossing the line five seconds ahead. In the feature race, Lindblad finished in a solid eighth place. He qualified seventh in Melbourne, and put up another overtaking masterclass in the sprint race, enabling him to score a second place podium; he overtook Christian Mansell and Laurens van Hoepen but was held at bay by eventual winner Martinius Stenshorne following a safety car restart. Despite moving up to the top-five in the first half of the race, he struggled with tyres and slipped back to eleventh at the flag. Lindblad continued to pick up points in Imola where he finished the races in eighth and seventh having qualified fourth. Lindblad's first retirement came in the Monaco sprint race, after he was involved in a multi-car collision on the opening lap. The next day however, he secured his best feature race result up to that point with fourth place. Lindblad secured a best qualifying result in Barcelona with a front row start. After finishing ninth in the sprint race, Lindblad overtook polesitter Mansell on lap 4 of the feature race and dominated from there onwards, becoming the youngest feature race winner in FIA F3 history. His good qualifying continued into Austria where he secured another front row. He retired from the sprint race due to a puncture sustained in a battle with Sami Meguetounif whilst fighting just outside the points. Lindblad also suffered contact from Alex Dunne which caused him to drop to seventh place.

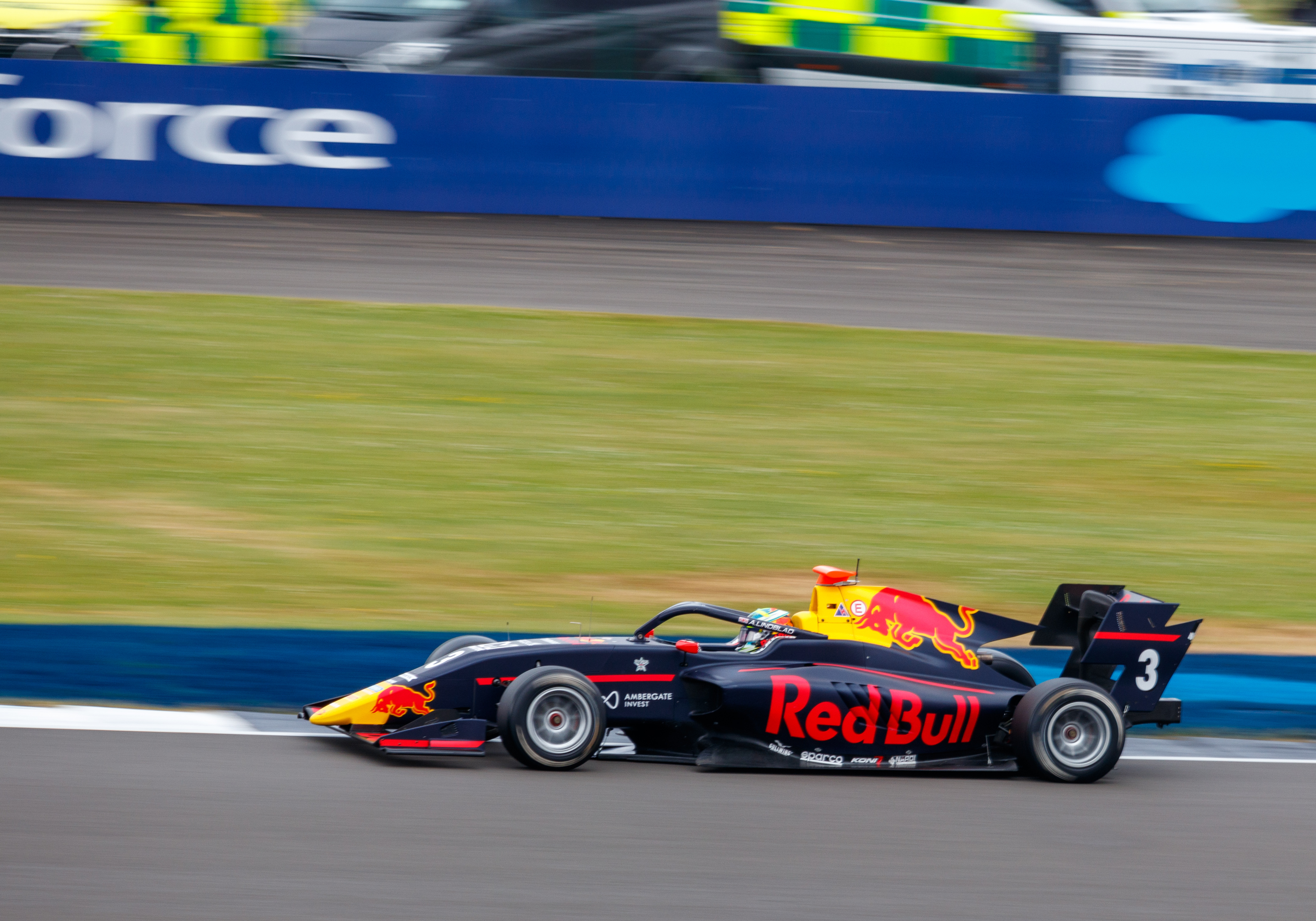
Lindblad completed his maiden double victory at Silverstone, on his way to fourth in the standings.

Silverstone became a standout for Lindblad, who first dominantly won the sprint race after taking the lead from Noel León at the start. The next day, Lindblad made the correct decision to pit for dry tyres during the formation lap on a wet but drying track; progressing to second from where he would inherit the feature race win following a penalty for Callum Voisin. In winning both races, Lindblad became the first driver in FIA F3 history to do the double — win both races of a two-race weekend — and put himself into second in the championship with three rounds remaining. However, this would be Lindblad's last points finish of the season as a string of poor qualifying results at Hungary, Spa, and Monza contributed to finishes outside the top ten. Race-ending incidents with Matías Zagazeta and Christian Mansell contributed to his non-scores in the former two feature races. Additionally, a collision with Voisin in the last-named round, led to a penalty that demoted Lindblad from ninth to 16th in the feature race. Despite dropping to fourth in the standings, Lindblad ended the season as the highest-scoring rookie and helped Prema to win the teams' championship for a third successive year. Lindblad was again selected as a finalist for the Aston Martin Autosport BRDC Award for 2024, alongside Freddie Slater, Louis Sharp and Deagen Fairclough.

==== 2025: Maiden title in Formula Regional Oceania ====
In preparation for his Formula 2 campaign in 2025, Lindblad competed in the Formula Regional Oceania Championship with M2 Competition. He started the year off with three podiums in all three races at the season opener at Taupo International Motorsport Park, which included a pole position and win in the third race. Lindblad continued his podium streak at Hampton Downs, this time scoring two poles and two victories in races 1 and 3 respectively, while he finished the second race in third.

Lindblad won the first race at Manfeild, but his seven-race podium streak came to an end during a wet second race, finishing in fourteenth place following a safety car restart. He bounced back in the third race to take his fifth pole and win of the year, expanding his gap to 40 points from nearest rival Nikita Johnson. During race 1 of the Teretonga Park round, Lindblad achieved pole position and the fastest lap, finishing in second place behind teammate Matías Zagazeta. Lindblad came in sixth during race 2 and claimed another victory in race 3, expanding his championship margin to 59 points ahead of Johnson.

Lindblad clinched the championship at Highlands Motorsport Park, finishing the race in second place, due to the fact that he finished ahead of rivals Johnson and Zack Scoular. Lindblad retired from race 2 after he was caught in an opening crash involving Zagazeta, Patrick Heuzenroeder, and Michael Shin. Lindblad bounced back during the season-ending New Zealand Grand Prix, finishing third. Overall, Lindblad finished the season with six wins and 370 points. Additionally, he was able to gain 18 points for his FIA Super Licence for winning the championship.

=== FIA Formula 2 (2025) ===
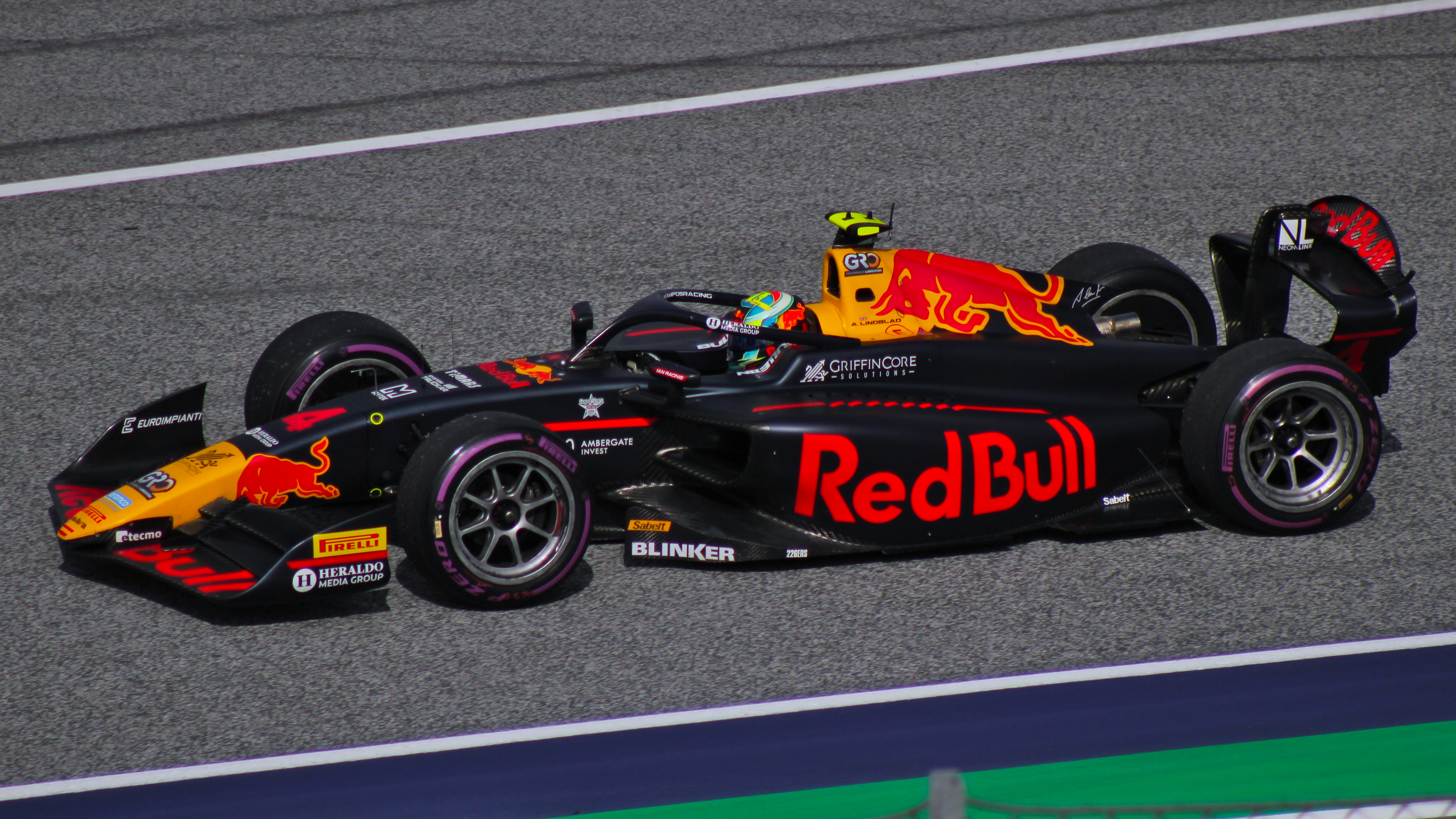
Lindblad contested FIA Formula 2 in 2025, becoming the youngest race winner in Formula Two history, aged 17.

In September 2024, Lindblad announced that he would be promoted to FIA Formula 2 with Campos Racing for 2025. Ahead of the season, Lindblad remarked that he was "filled with confidence" and anticipated a "really big challenge". After finishing just outside the points during the Melbourne sprint, he had an improved performance in Bahrain despite qualifying sixteenth, making up positions to finish fifth in the sprint race and eighth in the feature. In Jeddah, Lindblad qualified fifth. After benefitting from a mistake from Pepe Martí, Lindblad went on to finish second on the road, but was promoted to the win after Richard Verschoor was penalised. (Note: Lindblad's age was incorrectly stated as 17 years and 243 days in initial reports.) This made Lindblad the youngest Formula 2 winner in history at 17 years and 254 days. In the feature race, he finished seventh. He qualified sixth in Imola, and finished in second during the sprint following a strong start. A slow stop during the pit cycle dropped Lindblad out of podium contention in the feature race, which he placed fourth. In Monaco, Lindblad received a ten-second penalty for causing a collision with Jak Crawford, this dropped him off the podium to eighth. History repeated itself the next day as he was set to finish third during the feature race, but dropped to fifth after a penalty for speeding in the pit lane. Barcelona became a standout for Lindblad, as he claimed pole position became the second-youngest polesitter in F2 history behind Théo Pourchaire. After finishing eighth in the sprint despite a tangle with Richard Verschoor, he successfully converted his pole to feature race victory in his team's home race.

A challenging patch of form followed starting from Austria, where he scored no points after collisions with Luke Browning and Oliver Goethe in the sprint and feature race respectively, and finished eighth in a wet Silverstone feature race. He qualified fifth in Spa-Francorchamps, and made his way to second in a damp feature race, but was disqualified for illegal tyre pressures. In Budapest, Lindblad was embroiled in a contentious battle with teammate Martí, but struggled with tyres late on and finished fourth, but dropped to tenth after a penalty for leaving the track and gaining an advantage. He finished sixth in the feature race on the alternate strategy. Lindblad returned to the podium during the sprint race in Monza, finishing second, but was criticised for his collisions during the feature race with Alex Dunne and Roman Staněk, earning Lindblad a ten-place grid penalty for the Baku sprint race. He did not fare much better there, although he managed a sixth place finish in the feature race. Lindblad qualified seventeenth in Qatar, but he finished fourth in the feature race after a gamble to fit softs early on the alternate strategy despite a post-race investigation. Abu Dhabi provided one last hurrah for Lindblad in the sprint, as he held off Joshua Dürksen to take his third win of the campaign from reverse pole. An early safety car in the feature race compromised his alternate strategy, but he still salvaged a ninth place finish. Lindblad finished the season sixth in the standings on 134 points with three wins from five podiums.

== Formula One career ==
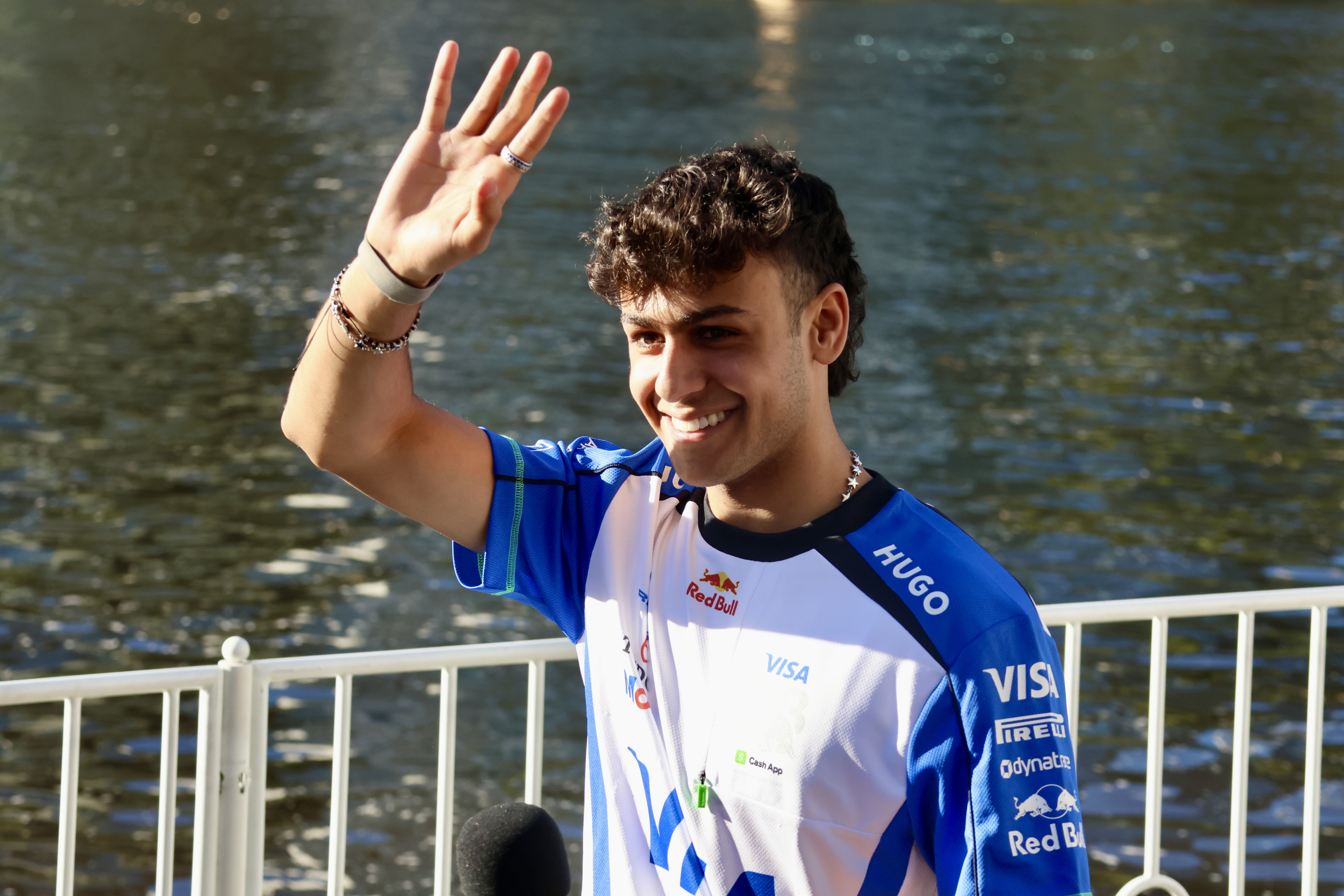
Lindblad (pictured in 2026) joined the Red Bull Junior Team in kart racing at the age of 13 and became a test driver for both Red Bull teams three years later.

For his 2021 campaign in kart racing, aged 13, Lindblad joined the Red Bull Junior Team as a Red Bull–supported driver, later becoming a full member ahead of his Formula 4 debut in 2022. He first drove a Formula One car in September 2024, completing a show-run in the Red Bull RB8 in Houston. Five months later, he conducted his maiden private test with Racing Bulls in the AT04 at Imola, which he repeated in June alongside Ayumu Iwasa. He raced against three on-foot Leeds United F.C. players—Willy Gnonto, Largie Ramazani, and Isaac Schmidt—at Elland Road that month in the RB7.

Upon request from Red Bull, Lindblad was granted an FIA Super License aged 17, similar to the request approved for Kimi Antonelli in 2024. He made his free practice debut for Red Bull at the British Grand Prix, where he set the fourteenth-fastest time in place of Yuki Tsunoda. He made a further practice appearance for Red Bull in Mexico City in place of Max Verstappen, where he placed sixth and impressed Red Bull with his pace and technical feedback. He again replaced Tsunoda during free practice of the season-ending Abu Dhabi Grand Prix, ending fifteenth overall. He joined Racing Bulls for the post-season test, where his running was cut short due to a mechanical issue.

=== Racing Bulls (2026) ===
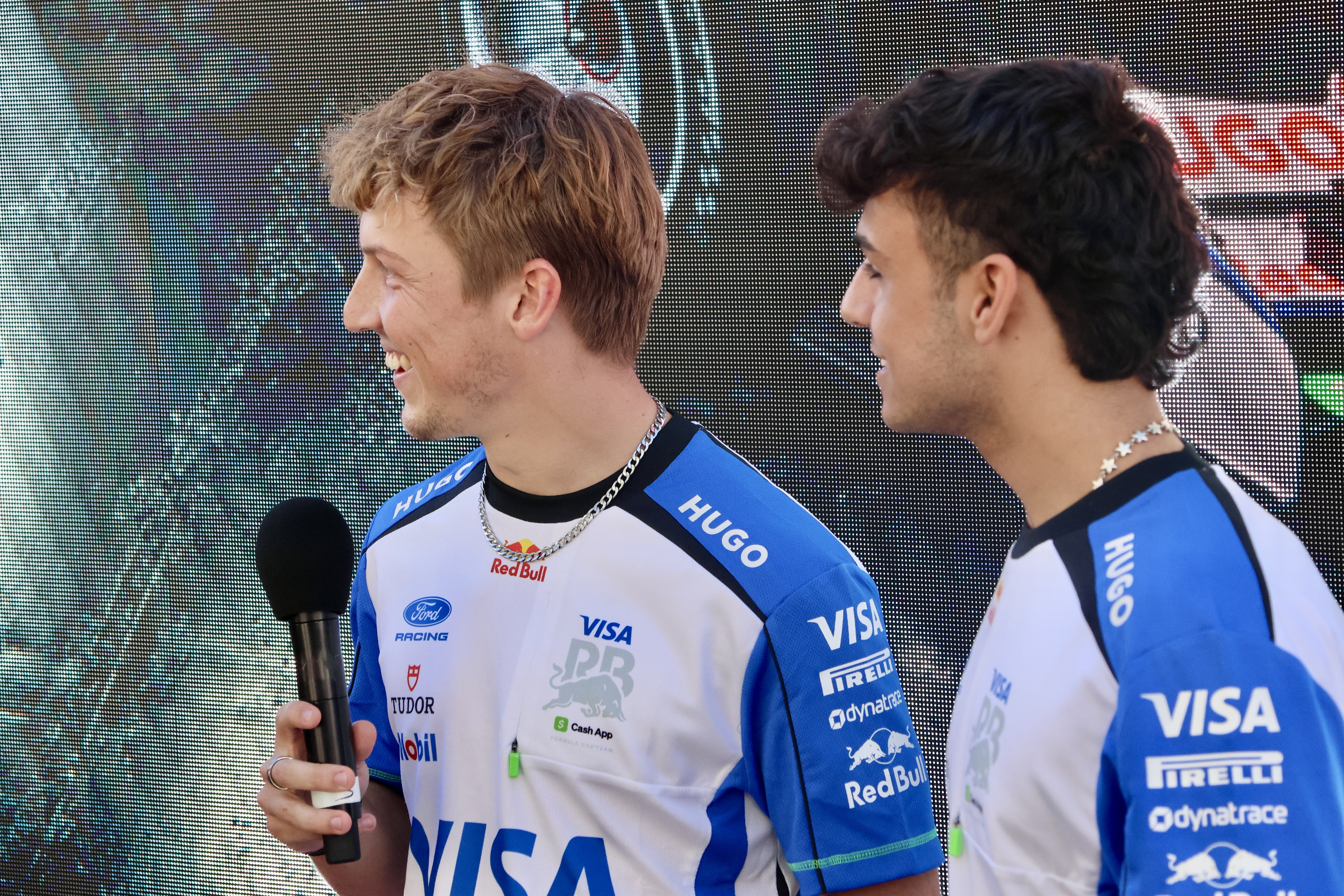
Lindblad (right) debuted in Formula One with Racing Bulls at the Australian Grand Prix in 2026, partnering Liam Lawson.

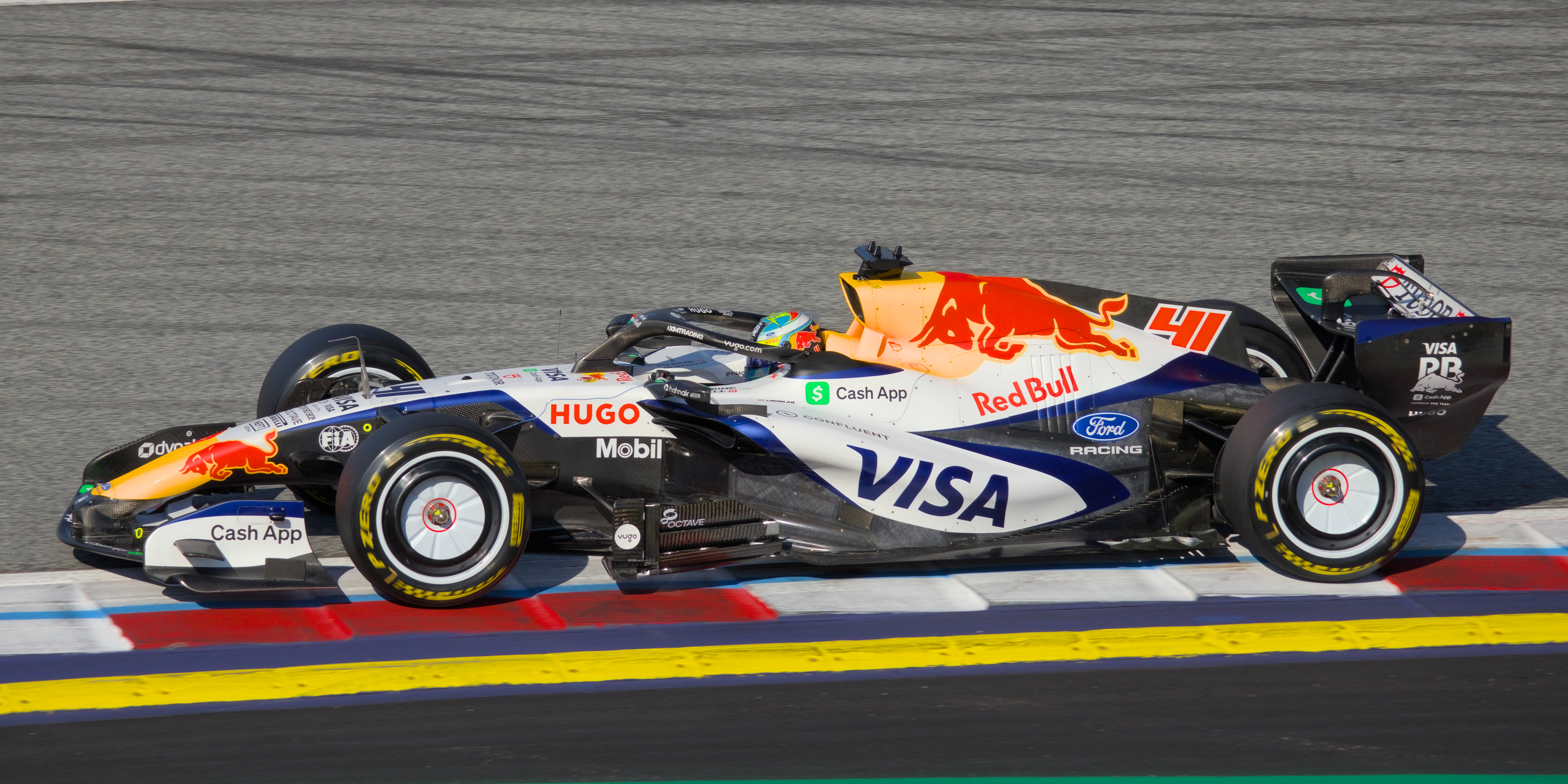
Lindblad driving the VCARB 03 at the 2026 Austrian Grand Prix

In December 2025, Lindblad signed for Racing Bulls—the sister team of Red Bull—to replace the promoted Isack Hadjar and compete alongside third-year Liam Lawson for new power unit and chassis regulations in 2026. Aged 18, he became the fourth-youngest driver in Formula One history and surpassed Oliver Bearman as the youngest-ever Briton; unsure whether he was "entirely ready" for Formula One, Lindblad insisted he was "used to being thrown in the deep end". Racing Bulls emerged as an upper-midfield team with the VCARB 03, with Lindblad qualifying ninth on debut in Australia, immediately passing the frontrunners to reach the podium positions before settling for eighth as Lawson dropped outside the points. Having retired from the sprint, he finished twelfth in China on an alternate strategy.

Lindblad placed fourteenth at both the Japanese Grand Prix and the Miami Grand Prix, before failing to start at the Canadian Grand Prix due to a gearbox issue. He scored points again with a seventh place finish in Monaco, a ninth place finish at Barcelona-Catalunya, and a tenth place finish in Austria. At his home race in Silverstone, Lindblad placed seventh, followed by a ninth place finish at the Belgian Grand Prix. He qualified ninth and finished tenth and the Hungarian Grand Prix. This was followed by a twelfth place finish in the Netherlands, an eighth place finish at Monza, and a ninth place finish at Madrid.

==== 2027 ====
On 12 November 2026, it was confirmed that Lindblad would continue to drive for Racing Bulls alongside Lawson in 2027.

== Personal life ==
Lindblad selected 41 as his personal driver number in Formula One, its resemblance to his initials, "AL", and lack of strong associations with other sports figures. His racing helmet uses shades of fluorescent yellow, teal, and red, featuring the Tiranga interposed between the flags of England and Sweden. He has been acclaimed by Indian fans as their sole representative in Formula One, where Indian drivers have been absent since Narain Karthikeyan in 2012, and has expressed his desire to see the return of the Indian Grand Prix.

Lindblad cites Lewis Hamilton—the only black driver in Formula One history—as his inspiration; he has further noted the "Big Three" of men's tennis, Michael Phelps, and Michael Jordan as his wider sporting idols. Beyond Formula One, he is interested in Grand Prix motorcycle racing, where his favourite rider is Marc Márquez; association football, where he supports the England national team; fashion design; and skateboarding. Since 2024, Lindblad has lived with his parents near Lisbon, Portugal. He holds both British and Swedish citizenship.

In an interview with Test Match Special on 16 July 2026, Lindblad revealed that he did not have his driving licence yet, but is working towards it.. He passed his theory test on 14 September 2026.

== Awards and honours ==
- Aramco Best Performance Award: 2025

== Karting record ==
=== Karting career summary ===
Season	Series	Team	Position
2015	LGM Series — IAME Cadet		48th
2016	LGM Series — IAME Cadet		21st
2016	Kartmasters British Grand Prix — Honda Cadet		8th
2016	Kartmasters British Grand Prix — IAME Cadet		16th
2016	Super 1 National Championships — IAME Cadet	Zip Team	12th
2017	LGM Series — IAME Cadet		3rd
2017	Kartmasters British Grand Prix — Honda Cadet	Oliver Rowland Motorsport	11th
2017	Kartmasters British Grand Prix — IAME Cadet	Oliver Rowland Motorsport	2nd
2017	Super 1 National Championships — IAME Cadet		2nd
2018	WSK Champions Cup — 60 Mini	Team Driver Racing Kart	33rd
2018	Andrea Margutti Trophy — 60 Mini	Team Driver Racing Kart	2nd
2018	LGM Series — IAME Cadet		1st
2018	Kartmasters British Grand Prix — Honda Cadet	Oliver Rowland Motorsport	5th
2018	Kartmasters British Grand Prix — IAME Cadet	Oliver Rowland Motorsport	7th
2018	Super 1 National Championships — IAME Cadet	Oliver Rowland Motorsport	1st
2019	WSK Champions Cup — OK-J	Forza Racing	2nd
2019	South Garda Winter Cup — OK-J	Forza Racing	14th
2019	WSK Super Master Series — OK-J	Forza Racing	8th
2019	WSK Euro Series — OK-J	Forza Racing	5th
2019	Italian Championship — OK-J	Forza Racing	6th
2019	Coupe de France — OK-J	Forza Racing	2nd
2019	CIK-FIA European Championship — OK-J	Forza Racing	14th
2019	CIK-FIA World Championship — OK-J	Forza Racing	34th
2019	IAME International Final — X30 Junior	Oliver Rowland Motorsport	NC
2019	WSK Open Cup — OK-J	KR Motorsport	9th
2019	WSK Final Cup — OK-J	KR Motorsport	10th
2020	WSK Champions Cup — OK-J	KR Motorsport	5th
2020	IAME Winter Cup — X30 Junior	Oliver Rowland Motorsport	14th
2020	South Garda Winter Cup — OK-J	KR Motorsport	3rd
2020	WSK Super Master Series — OK-J	KR Motorsport	1st
2020	CIK-FIA European Championship — OK-J	KR Motorsport	2nd
2020	WSK Euro Series — OK-J	KR Motorsport	4th
2020	Champions of the Future — OK-J	KR Motorsport	1st
2020	CIK-FIA World Championship — OK-J	KR Motorsport	5th
2020	WSK Open Cup — OK-J	KR Motorsport	2nd
2021	WSK Champions Cup — OK	KR Motorsport	3rd
2021	WSK Super Master Series — OK	KR Motorsport	3rd
2021	WSK Euro Series — OK	KR Motorsport	1st
2021	CIK-FIA European Championship — OK	KR Motorsport	3rd
2021	WSK Open Cup — OK	KR Motorsport	3rd
2021	Champions of the Future — OK	KR Motorsport	2nd
2021	CIK-FIA World Championship — OK	KR Motorsport	3rd
2021	WSK Final Cup — OK	KR Motorsport	1st
2022	WSK Super Master Series — KZ2	SP Motorsport	40th
2022	Champions of the Future Winter Series — OK	KR Motorsport	NC
2022	CIK-FIA European Championship — OK	KR Motorsport	16th
2022	CIK-FIA European Championship — KZ2	SP Motorsport	8th
2022	WSK Euro Series — OK	KR Motorsport	10th
2022	Deutsche Kart-Meisterschaft — KZ2	SP Motorsport	13th
2022	CIK-FIA World Cup — KZ2	SP Motorsport	3rd
2022	CIK-FIA World Championship — OK	KR Motorsport	32nd

=== Complete CIK-FIA results ===
==== Complete CIK-FIA Karting World Championship results ====
Year	Entrant	Class	Circuit	QH	SH	F
2019	Forza Racing	OK-J	(Finland) Alahärmä	28th	—N/a	Ret (Note: Did not finish, but was classified 34th.)
2020	KR Motorsport	OK-J	(Portugal) Portimão	6th	—N/a	5th
2021	KR Motorsport	OK	(Spain) Campillos	6th	—N/a	3rd
2022	KR Motorsport	OK	(Italy) Sarno	7th	6th	Ret (Note: Did not finish, but was classified 32nd.)
2022	SP Motorsport	KZ2†	(France) Le Mans	5th	6th	3rd

^{†} Class held as a Karting World Cup.

==== Complete CIK-FIA Karting European Championship results ====
(key) (Races in bold indicate pole position; races in italics indicate fastest lap)

Year	Entrant	Class	1	2	3	4	5	6	7	8	Pos	Points
2019	Forza Racing	OK-J	ANG; QH; 30	ANG; F 22	GEN; QH; 8	GEN; F 8	KRI; QH; 26	KRI; F 13	LEM; QH; 28	LEM; F 7	14th	23
2020	KR Motorsport	OK-J	ZUE; QH; 1	**ZUE**; **F** (5)	SAR; QH (4)	SAR; F 3	WAC; QH; 2	WAC; F 1			2nd	60
2021	KR Motorsport	OK	GEN; QH; 1	**GEN**; **F** 2	ESS; QH (8)	ESS; F (3)	SAR; QH; 5	SAR; F 3	ZUE; QH; 3	ZUE; F 2	3rd	80
2022	KR Motorsport	OK	POR; SH	POR; F	ZUE; SH; 10	ZUE; F 9	KRI; SH; 13	KRI; F 8	FRN; SH	FRN; F	16th	16
2022	SP Motorsport	KZ2	GEN; SH; 4	GEN; F 5	**CRE**; **QH**; 17	CRE; F 29					8th	18

== Racing record ==
=== Racing career summary ===
Season	Series	Team	Races	Wins	Poles	F/Laps	Podiums	Points	Position
2022	Italian F4 Championship	Van Amersfoort Racing	8	0	0	0	0	12	17th
2023	Formula 4 UAE Championship	Hitech Grand Prix	15	1	1	1	3	107	5th
2023	Italian F4 Championship	Prema Racing	21	6	4	3	10	263.5	3rd
2023	Euro 4 Championship	Prema Racing	9	1	1	2	4	124	4th
2023	Macau Formula 4 Race	SJM Theodore Prema Racing	1	1	1	1	1	—N/a	1st
2024	Formula Regional Middle East Championship	Mumbai Falcons Racing Limited	9	1	0	0	1	33	13th
2024	FIA Formula 3 Championship	Prema Racing	20	4	0	1	5	113	4th
2025	Formula Regional Oceania Championship	M2 Competition	15	6	6	6	12	370	1st
2025	FIA Formula 2 Championship	Campos Racing	27	3	1	2	5	134	6th
2025	Formula One	Oracle Red Bull Racing	Test driver						
2026	Formula One	Visa Cash App Racing Bulls F1 Team	20	0	0	0	0	38*	11th*

* Season still in progress.

=== Complete Italian F4 Championship results ===
(key) (Races in bold indicate pole position; races in italics indicate fastest lap)

Year	Entrant	1	2	3	4	5	6	7	8	9	10	11	12	13	14	15	16	17	18	19	20	21	22	Pos	Points
2022	Van Amersfoort Racing	IMO; 1	IMO; 2	IMO; 3	MIS; 1	MIS; 2	MIS; 3	SPA; 1	SPA; 2	SPA; 3	VLL; 1	VLL; 2	VLL; 3	RBR; 1; 15	RBR; 2; 15	RBR; 3	RBR; 4; 22	MNZ; 1; 7	MNZ; 2; 9	MNZ; 3 C	MUG; 1; 21	MUG; 2 Ret	MUG; 3; 8	17th	12
2023	Prema Racing	IMO; 1	IMO; 2; 2	IMO; 3; 2	IMO; 4; 1	MIS; 1; 2	**MIS**; **2**; 1	**MIS**; **3**; 1	SPA; 1; 5	SPA; 2; 3‡	SPA; 3 Ret	MNZ; 1; 1	**MNZ**; **2**; 1	**MNZ**; **3**; 1	LEC; 1; 8	LEC; 2; 4	LEC; 3; 6	MUG; 1; 5	MUG; 2; 31†	MUG; 3; 10	VLL; 1; 6	VLL; 2; 9	VLL; 3; 14	3rd	263.5

^{†} Did not finish, but was classified as he had completed more than 90% of the race distance.
^{‡} Half points awarded as less than 75% of race distance was completed.

=== Complete Formula 4 UAE Championship results ===
(key) (Races in bold indicate pole position; races in italics indicate fastest lap)

Year	Entrant	1	2	3	4	5	6	7	8	9	10	11	12	13	14	15	Pos	Points
2023	Hitech Grand Prix	DUB1; 1; 8	DUB1; 2; 3	**DUB1**; **3**; 1	KMT1; 1; 5	KMT1; 2; 33	KMT1; 3; 7	KMT2; 1 Ret	KMT2; 2; 16	KMT2; 3; 5	DUB2; 1 Ret	DUB2; 2; 19	DUB2; 3; 4	YMC; 1; 3	YMC; 2; 5	YMC; 3 Ret	5th	107

=== Complete Euro 4 Championship results ===
(key) (Races in bold indicate pole position; races in italics indicate fastest lap)

Year	Entrant	1	2	3	4	5	6	7	8	9	Pos	Points
2023	Prema Racing	MUG; 1; 4	**MUG**; **2**; 4	MUG; 3; 5	MNZ; 1; 2	MNZ; 2; 2	MNZ; 3; 1	CAT; 1; 2	CAT; 2; 10	CAT; 3; 11	4th	124

=== Complete Macau Formula 4 Race results ===
Year	Entrant	Car	Qualifying	Quali race	Main race
2023	(Hong Kong) SJM Theodore Prema Racing	Tatuus F4-T421	1st	1st	1st

=== Complete Formula Regional Middle East Championship results ===
(key) (Races in bold indicate pole position; races in italics indicate fastest lap)

Year	Entrant	1	2	3	4	5	6	7	8	9	10	11	12	13	14	15	Pos	Points
2024	Mumbai Falcons Racing Limited	YMC1; 1; 10	YMC1; 2; 1	YMC1; 3; 8	YMC2; 1; 15	YMC2; 2; 9	YMC2; 3; 27†	DUB1; 1; 15	DUB1; 2; 10	DUB1; 3; 24†	YMC3; 1	YMC3; 2	YMC3; 3	DUB2; 1	DUB2; 2	DUB2; 3	13th	33

^{†} Did not finish, but was classified as he had completed more than 90% of the race distance.

=== Complete FIA Formula 3 Championship results ===
(key) (Races in bold indicate pole position; races in italics indicate points for the fastest lap of the top-10 finishers)

Year	Entrant	1	2	3	4	5	6	7	8	9	10	11	12	13	14	15	16	17	18	19	20	Pos	Points
2024	Prema Racing	BHR; SPR; 1	BHR; FEA; 8	MEL; SPR; 2	MEL; FEA; 11	IMO; SPR; 8	IMO; FEA; 7	MON; SPR; Ret	MON; FEA; 4	CAT; SPR; 9	CAT; FEA; 1	RBR; SPR; Ret	RBR; FEA; 7	SIL; SPR; 1	SIL; FEA; 1	HUN; SPR; 15	HUN; FEA; 28†	SPA; SPR; 15	SPA; FEA; Ret	MNZ; SPR; 12	MNZ; FEA; 16	4th	113

^{†} Did not finish, but was classified as he had completed more than 90% of the race distance.

=== Complete Formula Regional Oceania Championship results ===
(key) (Races in bold indicate pole position; races in italics indicate fastest lap)

Year	Entrant	1	2	3	4	5	6	7	8	9	10	11	12	13	14	15	Pos	Points
2025	M2 Competition	TAU; 1; 3	TAU; 2; 3	**TAU**; **3**; 1	**HMP**; **1**; 1	HMP; 2; 3	**HMP**; **3**; 1	**MAN**; **1**; 1	MAN; 2; 14	**MAN**; **3**; 1	**TER**; **1**; 2	TER; 2; 6	TER; 3; 1	HIG; 1; 2	HIG; 2 Ret	HIG; 3; 3	1st	370

=== Complete New Zealand Grand Prix results ===
Year	Entrant	Car	Qualifying	Main race
2025	(New Zealand) M2 Competition	Tatuus FT-60	5th	3rd

=== Complete FIA Formula 2 Championship results ===
(key) (Races in bold indicate pole position; races in italics indicate points for the fastest lap of the top-10 finishers)

Year	Entrant	1	2	3	4	5	6	7	8	9	10	11	12	13	14	15	16	17	18	19	20	21	22	23	24	25	26	27	28	Pos	Points
2025	Campos Racing	MEL; SPR; 10	MEL; FEA; C	BHR; SPR; 5	BHR; FEA; 8	JED; SPR; 1	JED; FEA; 7	IMO; SPR; 2	IMO; FEA; 4	MON; SPR; 8	MON; FEA; 5‡	CAT; SPR; 8	**CAT**; **FEA**; 1	RBR; SPR; Ret	RBR; FEA; 12	SIL; SPR; 9	SIL; FEA; 8	SPA; SPR; 17	SPA; FEA; DSQ	HUN; SPR; 10	HUN; FEA; 6	MNZ; SPR; 2	MNZ; FEA; Ret	BAK; SPR; 10	BAK; FEA; 6	LSL; SPR; 18	LSL; FEA; 4	YMC; SPR; 1	YMC; FEA; 9	6th	134

^{‡} Reduced points awarded as between 25% and 50% of race distance was completed.

=== Complete Formula One results ===
(key) (Races in bold indicate pole position; races in italics indicate fastest lap; ^{superscript} indicates point-scoring sprint position)

Year	Entrant	Chassis	Engine	1	2	3	4	5	6	7	8	9	10	11	12	13	14	15	16	17	18	19	20	21	22	23	24	WDC	Points
2025	Oracle Red Bull Racing	Red Bull Racing RB21	Honda RBPTH003 1.6 V6 t	AUS	CHN	JPN	BHR	SAU	MIA	EMI	MON	ESP	CAN	AUT	GBR; TD	BEL	HUN	NED	ITA	AZE	SIN	USA	MXC; TD	SAP	LVG	QAT	ABU; TD	—	—
2026	Visa Cash App Racing Bulls F1 Team	Racing Bulls VCARB 03	Red Bull Ford DM01 1.6 V6 t	AUS; 8	CHN; 12	JPN; 14	MIA; 14	CAN; DNS^{8}	MON; 6	BCN; 9	AUT; 10	GBR; 7	BEL; 9	HUN; 10	NED; 12	ITA; 8	ESP; 9	AZE; 7	BHR; 10	SIN; 15	USA; 12	MXC; Ret	SAP; 11	LVG	QAT	ABU		11th*	38*

* Season still in progress.

== Notes ==
Sporting positions
Preceded by Andrea Kimi Antonelli	Italian F4 Championship; Rookies' Champion; 2023	Succeeded by Alex Powell
Preceded by Established	Macau Formula 4 Race; Winner; 2023	Succeeded by Jules Roussel (FIA F4 World Cup)
Preceded by Roman Biliński	Formula Regional Oceania Championship; Champion; 2025	Succeeded by Ugo Ugochukwu
