= 2022 FIA Motorsport Games Esports Cup =

Video game competition

Race details
Date	26–30 October
Official name	FIA Motorsport Games Digital Cup
Official name	Circuit Paul Ricard, France
Course	Permanent circuit 5.842 km (3.630 mi)
- Medalists
1st place, gold medalist(s)	(United Kingdom) James Baldwin	Team United Kingdom
2nd place, silver medalist(s)	(Netherlands) Chris Harteveld	Team Netherlands
3rd place, bronze medalist(s)	(Spain) Alberto García	Team Spain

The 2022 Fanatec FIA Motorsport Games Esports Cup was the second FIA Motorsport Games Digital Cup, to be held at Circuit Paul Ricard, France on 26 October to 30 October 2022. The race was contested with GT3-spec cars. The event is the part of the 2022 FIA Motorsport Games.

== Entry list ==
Team	Car	No.	Driver name
Team Australia	McLaren 720S GT3	1	Philippa Boquida
Team Italy	Lamborghini Huracán GT3 Evo	3	Luca Losio
Team Poland	Lamborghini Huracán GT3 Evo	4	Marcin Świderek
(Georgia (country)) Team Georgia	McLaren 720S GT3	5	Sandro Chanturia
Team Hong Kong	Aston Martin Vantage AMR GT3	6	Jonathan Wong
Team Latvia	Porsche 911 GT3 R	7	Andrejs Gubarevs
Team Lithuania	Ferrari 488 GT3 Evo 2020	8	Tauras Gudinavičius
Team Luxembourg	Mercedes-AMG GT3 Evo	9	Daniel Lahyr
Team Portugal	Ferrari 488 GT3 Evo 2020	10	João Cavaca
Team Chinese Taipei	BMW M4 GT3	11	Lin Kuei-Min
Team Norway	Porsche 911 GT3 R	12	Tommy Østgaard
Team United Kingdom	McLaren 720S GT3	13	James Baldwin
(The Bahamas) Team Bahamas	McLaren 720S GT3	14	Dominick Robinson
Team Guatemala	McLaren 720S GT3	15	Juanes Morales
Team Mozambique	Porsche 911 GT3 R	16	Dylan Jesus
Team Nigeria	Bentley Continental GT3	17	Segun Akin-Olugbade
Team Peru	Ferrari 488 GT3 Evo 2020	18	Ian Kishimoto
Team Switzerland	BMW M4 GT3	19	Thomas Schmid
Team Turkey	McLaren 720S GT3	20	Ulaş Özyıldırım
Team Brazil	McLaren 720S GT3	21	Igor Rodrigues
Team Estonia	McLaren 720S GT3	22	Juss Parek
Team Andorra	Porsche 911 GT3 R	23	Octavio Pisco
Team Bangladesh	Porsche 911 GT3 R	24	Arhaam Rahaman
Team Sweden	McLaren 720S GT3	25	Mikael Sundström
Team Austria	BMW M4 GT3	26	Felix Temper
Team Barbados	McLaren 720S GT3	27	Leon Sealy
Team Iceland	Audi R8 LMS Evo II	28	Hákon Jökulsson
Team South Africa	Mercedes-AMG GT3 Evo	29	Koketso Pilane
Team Netherlands	McLaren 720S GT3	30	Chris Harteveld
Team Greece	McLaren 720S GT3	31	Harris Mitropoulos
Team Malta	Audi R8 LMS Evo II	32	Dean Vella
Team Kosovo	McLaren 720S GT3	33	Visar Gjikolli
Team Kuwait	Ferrari 488 GT3 Evo 2020	34	Rashed Alrashdan
Team Denmark	McLaren 720S GT3	35	Mikkel Gade
Team Hungary	BMW M4 GT3	36	Kristóf Artzt
Team Uzbekistan	Ferrari 488 GT3 Evo 2020	37	Eldor Radjapov
Team Croatia	McLaren 720S GT3	38	Mihael Matika
Team Spain	Lamborghini Huracán GT3 Evo	39	Alberto García
Team Germany	Mercedes-AMG GT3 Evo	40	Constantin Tscharf
Team Japan	McLaren 720S GT3	41	Sota Muto
Team Slovakia	McLaren 720S GT3	42	Bence Bánki
Team Ukraine	Lamborghini Huracán GT3 Evo	43	Devid Pastukhov
Team United Arab Emirates	Porsche 911 GT3 R	44	Sultan Abdulrahman
Team Singapore	McLaren 720S GT3	45	Ar Muhammad Aleef
Team Belgium	McLaren 720S GT3	46	Mathias Kühn
Team Albania	McLaren 720S GT3	47	Andri Gjoka
Team Mexico	BMW M4 GT3	48	Michael Teichmann
Team Israel	Audi R8 LMS Evo II	49	Denis Gribov
Team South Korea	Honda NSX GT3 Evo22	50	Park Yun-ho
Team Sri Lanka	Mercedes-AMG GT3 Evo	51	Savi Rathnayake
Team Malaysia	Ferrari 488 GT3 Evo 2020	52	Naquib Azlan
Team Slovenia	BMW M4 GT3	53	Klemen Jug
Team United States	Porsche 911 GT3 R	54	Tyler Limsnukan
Team Indonesia	McLaren 720S GT3	55	Presley Martono
Team France	McLaren 720S GT3	56	Alexandre Lê
Team Czech Republic	McLaren 720S GT3	57	Martin Kadlečík
Team Chile	Porsche 911 GT3 R	77	Nicolás Rubilar

== Results ==
=== General Qualifying ===
Pos.	No.	Driver name	Car	Team	Time	Gap	Quarter-final Number	Grid Position
1	21	Igor Rodrigues	McLaren 720S GT3	Team Brazil	1:52.470	–	1	1
2	30	Chris Harteveld	McLaren 720S GT3	Team Netherlands	1:52.727	+ 0.257	2	1
3	13	James Baldwin	McLaren 720S GT3	Team United Kingdom	1:52.750	+ 0.280	3	1
4	20	Ulas Ozyildirim	McLaren 720S GT3	Team Turkey	1:52.900	+ 0.430	1	2
5	57	Martin Kadlečík	McLaren 720S GT3	Team Czech Republic	1:52.927	+ 0.457	2	2
6	41	Sota Muto	McLaren 720S GT3	Team Japan	1:52.942	+ 0.472	3	2
7	39	Alberto García	Lamborghini Huracán GT3 Evo	Team Spain	1:52.992	+ 0.522	1	3
8	1	Philippa Boquida	McLaren 720S GT3	Team Australia	1:53.085	+ 0.615	2	3
9	4	Marcin Świderek	Lamborghini Huracán GT3 Evo	Team Poland	1:53.090	+ 0.620	3	3
10	31	Harris Mitropoulos	McLaren 720S GT3	Team Greece	1:53.102	+ 0.632	1	4
11	22	Juss Parek	McLaren 720S GT3	Team Estonia	1:53.197	+ 0.727	2	4
12	3	Luca Losio	Lamborghini Huracán GT3 Evo	Team Italy	1:53.242	+ 0.772	3	4
13	42	Bence Bánki	McLaren 720S GT3	Team Slovakia	1:53.392	+ 0.922	1	5
14	46	Mathias Kühn	McLaren 720S GT3	Team Belgium	1:53.402	+ 0.932	2	5
15	8	Tauras Gudinavičius	Ferrari 488 GT3 Evo 2020	Team Lithuania	1:53.432	+ 0.962	3	5
16	45	Ar Muhammad Aleef	McLaren 720S GT3	Team Singapore	1:53.447	+ 0.977	1	6
17	40	Constantin Tscharf	Mercedes-AMG GT3 Evo	Team Germany	1:53.555	+ 1.085	2	6
18	6	Jonathan Wong	Aston Martin Vantage AMR GT3	Team Hong Kong	1:53.575	+ 1.105	3	6
19	35	Mikkel Gade	McLaren 720S GT3	Team Denmark	1:53.672	+ 1.202	1	7
20	56	Alexandre Lê	McLaren 720S GT3	Team France	1:53.692	+ 1.222	2	7
21	52	Naquib Azlan	Ferrari 488 GT3 Evo 2020	Team Malaysia	1:53.710	+ 1.240	3	7
22	55	Presley Martono	McLaren 720S GT3	Team Indonesia	1:53.715	+ 1.245	1	8
23	27	Leon Sealy	McLaren 720S GT3	Team Barbados	1:53.730	+ 1.260	2	8
24	25	Mikael Sundström	McLaren 720S GT3	Team Sweden	1:53.772	+ 1.302	3	8
25	11	Lin Kuei-Min	BMW M4 GT3	Team Chinese Taipei	1:53.787	+ 1.317	1	9
26	19	Thomas Schmid	BMW M4 GT3	Team Switzerland	1:53.817	+ 1.347	2	9
27	10	João Cavaca	Ferrari 488 GT3 Evo 2020	Team Portugal	1:53.850	+ 1.380	3	9
28	9	Daniel Lahyr	Mercedes-AMG GT3 Evo	Team Luxembourg	1:53.895	+ 1.425	1	10
29	77	Nicolás Rubilar	Porsche 911 GT3 R	Team Chile	1:53.952	+ 1.482	2	10
30	38	Mihael Matika	McLaren 720S GT3	Team Croatia	1:54.080	+ 1.610	3	10
31	32	Dean Vella	Audi R8 LMS Evo II	Team Malta	1:54.147	+ 1.677	1	11
32	54	Tyler Limsnukan	Porsche 911 GT3 R	Team United States	1:54.262	+ 1.792	2	11
33	48	Michael Teichmann	BMW M4 GT3	Team Mexico	1:54.290	+ 1.820	3	11
34	53	Klemen Jug	BMW M4 GT3	Team Slovenia	1:54.352	+ 1.882	1	12
35	29	Koketso Pilane	Mercedes-AMG GT3 Evo	Team South Africa	1:54.490	+ 2.020	2	12
36	12	Tommy Østgaard	Porsche 911 GT3 R	Team Norway	1:54.587	+ 2.117	3	12
37	7	Andrejs Gubarevs	Porsche 911 GT3 R	Team Latvia	1:54.587	+ 2.117	1	13
38	49	Denis Gribov	Audi R8 LMS Evo II	Team Israel	1:54.672	+ 2.202	2	13
39	36	Kristóf Artzt	BMW M4 GT3	Team Hungary	1:54.740	+ 2.270	3	13
40	15	Juanes Morales	McLaren 720S GT3	Team Guatemala	1:55.205	+ 2.735	1	14
41	28	Hákon Jökulsson	Audi R8 LMS Evo II	Team Iceland	1:55.220	+ 2.750	2	14
42	50	Park Yun-ho	Honda NSX GT3 Evo22	Team South Korea	1:55.575	+ 3.105	3	14
43	18	Ian Kishimoto	Ferrari 488 GT3 Evo 2020	Team Peru	1:55.785	+ 3.315	1	15
44	43	Devid Pastukhov	Lamborghini Huracán GT3 Evo	Team Ukraine	1:55.857	+ 3.387	2	15
45	47	Andri Gjoka	McLaren 720S GT3	Team Albania	1:56.015	+ 3.545	3	15
46	26	Felix Temper	BMW M4 GT3	Team Austria	1:56.612	+ 4.142	1	16
47	5	Sandro Chanturia	McLaren 720S GT3	(Georgia (country)) Team Georgia	1:56.762	+ 4.292	2	16
48	33	Visar Gjikolli	McLaren 720S GT3	Team Kosovo	1:57.057	+ 4.587	3	16
49	23	Octavio Pisco	Porsche 911 GT3 R	Team Andorra	1:57.375	+ 4.905	1	17
50	44	Sultan Abdulrahman	Porsche 911 GT3 R	Team United Arab Emirates	1:58.255	+ 5.785	2	17
51	37	Eldor Radjapov	Ferrari 488 GT3 Evo 2020	Team Uzbekistan	1:58.635	+ 6.165	3	17
52	34	Rashed Alrashdan	Ferrari 488 GT3 Evo 2020	Team Kuwait	1:58.945	+ 6.475	1	18
53	17	Segun Akin-Olugbade	Bentley Continental GT3	Team Nigeria	2:00.237	+ 7.767	2	18
54	14	Dominick Robinson	McLaren 720S GT3	(The Bahamas) Team Bahamas	2:07.157	+ 14.687	3	18
55	24	Arhaam Rahaman	Porsche 911 GT3 R	Team Bangladesh	–	–	1	19
56	51	Savi Rathnayake	Mercedes-AMG GT3 Evo	Team Sri Lanka	–	–	2	19
57	16	Dylan Jesus	Porsche 911 GT3 R	Team Mozambique	–	–	3	19

=== Quarter-finals ===
The competition consists of 3 Quarter-finals, the Top 10 of each Quarter-final proceed to the Semi-finals, while Places 11 to 19 get transferred to the "Last Chance" Qualifier stage.
Proceeds to the Semi-finals

==== Quarter-final 1 ====
Pos.	No.	Driver name	Car	Team	Gap	Best Lap
1	21	Igor Rodrigues	McLaren 720S GT3	Team Brazil	–	1:53.707
2	39	Alberto García	Lamborghini Huracán GT3 Evo	Team Spain	+ 12.677	1:54.195
3	31	Harris Mitropoulos	McLaren 720S GT3	Team Greece	+ 17.841	1:54.247
4	35	Mikkel Gade	McLaren 720S GT3	Team Denmark	+ 17.954	1:54.315
5	45	Ar Muhammad Aleef	McLaren 720S GT3	Team Singapore	+ 20.892	1:54.382
6	20	Ulas Ozyildirim	McLaren 720S GT3	Team Turkey	+ 31.778	1:54.255
7	42	Bence Bánki	McLaren 720S GT3	Team Slovakia	+ 32.437	1:54.427
8	55	Presley Martono	McLaren 720S GT3	Team Indonesia	+ 51.829	1:54.547
9	9	Daniel Lahyr	Mercedes-AMG GT3 Evo	Team Luxembourg	+ 1:22.039	1:54.277
10	32	Dean Vella	Audi R8 LMS Evo II	Team Malta	+ 1:25.825	1:55.925
11	18	Ian Kishimoto	Ferrari 488 GT3 Evo 2020	Team Peru	+ 1:27.843	1:56.057
12	53	Klemen Jug	BMW M4 GT3	Team Slovenia	+ 1:28.446	1:55.840
13	15	Juanes Morales	McLaren 720S GT3	Team Guatemala	+ 1:36.592	1:54.945
14	7	Andrejs Gubarevs	Porsche 911 GT3 R	Team Latvia	+ 1:52.286	1:55.610
15	26	Felix Temper	BMW M4 GT3	Team Austria	+ 2:05.746	1:55.917
16	23	Octavio Pisco	Porsche 911 GT3 R	Team Andorra	+ 2:22.955	1:55.605
17	24	Arhaam Rahaman	Porsche 911 GT3 R	Team Bangladesh	+ 5:03.789 ^{1}	1:58.000
18	34	Rashed Alrashdan	Ferrari 488 GT3 Evo 2020	Team Kuwait	DSQ	1:57.917
19	11	Lin Kuei-Min	BMW M4 GT3	Team Chinese Taipei	DSQ	1:55.770

Notes

- ^1 – Driver #24 had 5 seconds added to their race time for crossing the pit entry line

==== Quarter-final 2 ====
Pos.	No.	Driver name	Car	Team	Gap	Best Lap
1	57	Martin Kadlečík	McLaren 720S GT3	Team Czech Republic	–	1:53.602
2	30	Chris Harteveld	McLaren 720S GT3	Team Netherlands	+ 5.209	1:53.617
3	1	Philippa Boquida	McLaren 720S GT3	Team Australia	+ 16.814	1:53.772
4	46	Mathias Kühn	McLaren 720S GT3	Team Belgium	+ 28.509	1:54.200
5	56	Alexandre Lê	McLaren 720S GT3	Team France	+ 35.040	1:54.385
6	19	Thomas Schmid	BMW M4 GT3	Team Switzerland	+ 50.272	1:55.110
7	40	Constantin Tscharf	Mercedes-AMG GT3 Evo	Team Germany	+ 52.843	1:55.205
8	22	Juss Parek	McLaren 720S GT3	Team Estonia	+ 1:04.174	1:55.245
9	27	Leon Sealy	McLaren 720S GT3	Team Barbados	+ 1:11.460	1:55.337
10	54	Tyler Limsnukan	Porsche 911 GT3 R	Team United States	+ 1:15.313	1:54.922
11	49	Denis Gribov	Audi R8 LMS Evo II	Team Israel	+ 1:20.776	1:55.850
12	77	Nicolás Rubilar	Porsche 911 GT3 R	Team Chile	+ 1:21.081	1:54.710
13	28	Hákon Jökulsson	Audi R8 LMS Evo II	Team Iceland	+ 1:35.750	1:55.065
14	29	Koketso Pilane	Mercedes-AMG GT3 Evo	Team South Africa	+ 1:39.006	1:55.205
15	43	Devid Pastukhov	Lamborghini Huracán GT3 Evo	Team Ukraine	+ 2:03.759	1:56.092
16	5	Sandro Chanturia	McLaren 720S GT3	(Georgia (country)) Team Georgia	+ 2:10.033	1:55.812
17	44	Sultan Abdulrahman	Porsche 911 GT3 R	Team United Arab Emirates	+ 3:03.982	1:57.830
18	17	Segun Akin-Olugbade	Bentley Continental GT3	Team Nigeria	+ 7:35.407	1:59.020

==== Quarter-final 3 ====
Pos.	No.	Driver name	Car	Team	Gap	Best Lap
1	13	James Baldwin	McLaren 720S GT3	Team United Kingdom	–	1:53.745
2	8	Tauras Gudinavičius	Ferrari 488 GT3 Evo 2020	Team Lithuania	+ 33.579	1:54.245
3	52	Naquib Azlan	Ferrari 488 GT3 Evo 2020	Team Malaysia	+ 39.658	1:54.605
4	6	Jonathan Wong	Aston Martin Vantage AMR GT3	Team Hong Kong	+ 40.113	1:54.790
5	10	João Cavaca	Ferrari 488 GT3 Evo 2020	Team Portugal	+ 40.254	1:54.847
6	25	Mikael Sundström	McLaren 720S GT3	Team Sweden	+ 42.490	1:54.815
7	41	Sota Muto	McLaren 720S GT3	Team Japan	+ 51.306	1:54.067
8	4	Marcin Świderek	Lamborghini Huracán GT3 Evo	Team Poland	+ 53.223	1:54.295
9	12	Tommy Østgaard	Porsche 911 GT3 R	Team Norway	+ 55.447	1:54.702
10	38	Mihael Matika	McLaren 720S GT3	Team Croatia	+ 1:05.822	1:54.885
11	48	Michael Teichmann	BMW M4 GT3	Team Mexico	+ 1:07.515	1:55.645
12	50	Park Yun-ho	Honda NSX GT3 Evo22	Team South Korea	+ 1:29.970	1:55.750
13	36	Kristóf Artzt	BMW M4 GT3	Team Hungary	+ 2:09.627	1:55.417
14	33	Visar Gjikolli	McLaren 720S GT3	Team Kosovo	+ 2:33.232	1:57.127
15	37	Eldor Radjapov	Ferrari 488 GT3 Evo 2020	Team Uzbekistan	+ 3:27.326	1:57.507
16	47	Andri Gjoka	McLaren 720S GT3	Team Albania	+ 3:45.781	1:57.937
17	14	Dominick Robinson	McLaren 720S GT3	(The Bahamas) Team Bahamas	+ 8:10.702	2:05.502
18	3	Luca Losio	Lamborghini Huracán GT3 Evo	Team Italy	DSQ	1:54.647

=== Last Chance ===
After the completion of all the Quarter-finals positions 11 to 19 get another chance in two Last Chance races. The Top 5 of each race advance to the Semi-finals, the rest are eliminated.
Proceeds to the Semi-finals
Eliminated

==== Last Chance 1 ====
Pos.	No.	Driver name	Car	Team	Gap	Best Lap
1	77	Nicolás Rubilar	Porsche 911 GT3 R	Team Chile	–	1:54.270
2	29	Koketso Pilane	Mercedes-AMG GT3 Evo	Team South Africa	+ 18.190	1:55.150
3	18	Ian Kishimoto	Ferrari 488 GT3 Evo 2020	Team Peru	+ 20.654	1:55.695
4	48	Michael Teichmann	BMW M4 GT3	Team Mexico	+ 21.126	1:55.665
5	11	Lin Kuei-Min	BMW M4 GT3	Team Chinese Taipei	+ 29.413 ^{1}	1:55.465
6	36	Kristóf Artzt	BMW M4 GT3	Team Hungary	+ 52.976	1:55.820
7	26	Felix Temper	BMW M4 GT3	Team Austria	+ 1:21.436	1:56.235
8	5	Sandro Chanturia	McLaren 720S GT3	(Georgia (country)) Team Georgia	+ 1:30.780 ^{2}	1:56.977
9	15	Juanes Morales	McLaren 720S GT3	Team Guatemala	+ 1:44.116	1:56.170
10	17	Segun Akin-Olugbade	Bentley Continental GT3	Team Nigeria	+ 3:42.529	1:59.237
11	24	Arhaam Rahaman	Porsche 911 GT3 R	Team Bangladesh	+ 4:09.068 ^{4}	1:57.517
12	37	Eldor Radjapov	Ferrari 488 GT3 Evo 2020	Team Uzbekistan	+ 4:47.805 ^{3}	1:59.427
13	14	Dominick Robinson	McLaren 720S GT3	(The Bahamas) Team Bahamas	+ 5:04.272	2:01.697

Notes

- ^1 – The driver of car #11 has had 5 seconds added to their total race time
- ^2 – The driver of car #05 has had 10 seconds added to their total race time
- ^3 – The driver of car #37 has had 5 seconds added to their race time
- ^4 – The driver of car #24 has had 5 seconds added to their total race time

==== Last Chance 2 ====
Pos.	No.	Driver name	Car	Team	Gap	Best Lap
1	3	Luca Losio	Lamborghini Huracán GT3 Evo	Team Italy	–	1:54.530
2	49	Denis Gribov	Audi R8 LMS Evo II	Team Israel	+ 12.276	1:55.510
3	53	Klemen Jug	BMW M4 GT3	Team Slovenia	+ 15.258	1:55.257
4	7	Andrejs Gubarevs	Porsche 911 GT3 R	Team Latvia	+ 45.405	1:55.472
5	23	Octavio Pisco	Porsche 911 GT3 R	Team Andorra	+ 48.503	1:56.365
6	50	Park Yun-ho	Honda NSX GT3 Evo22	Team South Korea	+ 52.596	1:55.315
7	28	Hákon Jökulsson	Audi R8 LMS Evo II	Team Iceland	+ 1:09.370	1:55.407
8	43	Devid Pastukhov	Lamborghini Huracán GT3 Evo	Team Ukraine	+ 1:34.395	1:57.240
9	47	Andri Gjoka	McLaren 720S GT3	Team Albania	+ 1:58.503	1:56.800
10	34	Rashed Alrashdan	Ferrari 488 GT3 Evo 2020	Team Kuwait	+ 2:25.721	1:57.480
11	44	Sultan Abdulrahman	Porsche 911 GT3 R	Team United Arab Emirates	+ 2:35.219	1:58.042
12	33	Visar Gjikolli	McLaren 720S GT3	Team Kosovo	DSQ	1:56.352

=== Semi-final ===
The Top 10 of each Semi-final advance to the Final, the rest are eliminated.
Proceeds to the final
Eliminated

==== Semi-final 1 ====
Pos.	No.	Driver name	Car	Team	Gap	Best Lap
1	13	James Baldwin	McLaren 720S GT3	Team United Kingdom	–	1:53.572
2	30	Chris Harteveld	McLaren 720S GT3	Team Netherlands	+ 5.974	1:53.760
3	21	Igor Rodrigues	McLaren 720S GT3	Team Brazil	+ 7.743 ^{2}	1:53.752
4	31	Harris Mitropoulos	McLaren 720S GT3	Team Greece	+ 21.549	1:53.997
5	45	Ar Muhammad Aleef	McLaren 720S GT3	Team Singapore	+ 22.045	1:54.182
6	12	Tommy Østgaard	Porsche 911 GT3 R	Team Norway	+ 30.103	1:54.100
7	41	Sota Muto	McLaren 720S GT3	Team Japan	+ 36.997	1:54.282
8	52	Naquib Azlan	Ferrari 488 GT3 Evo 2020	Team Malaysia	+ 37.781 ^{3}	1:54.125
9	42	Bence Bánki	McLaren 720S GT3	Team Slovakia	+ 38.122	1:54.337
10	46	Mathias Kühn	McLaren 720S GT3	Team Belgium	+ 40.341	1:54.257
11	29	Koketso Pilane	Mercedes-AMG GT3 Evo	Team South Africa	+ 41.954	1:54.830
12	22	Juss Parek	McLaren 720S GT3	Team Estonia	+ 46.623 ^{1}	1:54.732
13	77	Nicolás Rubilar	Porsche 911 GT3 R	Team Chile	+ 46.863	1:54.585
14	10	João Cavaca	Ferrari 488 GT3 Evo 2020	Team Portugal	+ 46.905	1:54.797
15	19	Thomas Schmid	BMW M4 GT3	Team Switzerland	+ 49.605	1:54.880
16	54	Tyler Limsnukan	Porsche 911 GT3 R	Team United States	+ 1:02.687	1:54.940
17	48	Michael Teichmann	BMW M4 GT3	Team Mexico	+ 1:13.229	1:55.490
18	9	Daniel Lahyr	Mercedes-AMG GT3 Evo	Team Luxembourg	+ 1:21.434	1:54.695
19	18	Ian Kishimoto	Ferrari 488 GT3 Evo 2020	Team Peru	+ 31 Laps	–
20	11	Lin Kuei-Min	BMW M4 GT3	Team Chinese Taipei	DSQ ^{4}	1:55.012

Notes

- ^1 – The driver of car #22 has had 5 seconds added to their total race time
- ^2 – The driver of car #21 has had 5 seconds added to their total race time
- ^3 – The driver of car #52 has had 1 second added to their total race time
- ^4 – The driver of car #11 has been disqualified from the race

==== Semi-final 2 ====
Pos.	No.	Driver name	Car	Team	Gap	Best Lap
1	57	Martin Kadlečík	McLaren 720S GT3	Team Czech Republic	–	1:53.865
2	39	Alberto García	Lamborghini Huracán GT3 Evo	Team Spain	+ 6.771	1:53.915
3	1	Philippa Boquida	McLaren 720S GT3	Team Australia	+ 10.462	1:53.942
4	4	Marcin Świderek	Lamborghini Huracán GT3 Evo	Team Poland	+ 25.590	1:54.082
5	40	Constantin Tscharf	Mercedes-AMG GT3 Evo	Team Germany	+ 29.915	1:54.712
6	55	Presley Martono	McLaren 720S GT3	Team Indonesia	+ 30.178	1:54.552
7	6	Jonathan Wong	Aston Martin Vantage AMR GT3	Team Hong Kong	+ 32.386	1:54.680
8	20	Ulas Ozyildirim	McLaren 720S GT3	Team Turkey	+ 33.073	1:54.115
9	38	Mihael Matika	McLaren 720S GT3	Team Croatia	+ 46.159	1:54.942
10	56	Alexandre Lê	McLaren 720S GT3	Team France	+ 46.887	1:54.917
11	25	Mikael Sundström	McLaren 720S GT3	Team Sweden	+ 47.935	1:54.870
12	8	Tauras Gudinavičius	Ferrari 488 GT3 Evo 2020	Team Lithuania	+ 55.302	1:54.965
13	27	Leon Sealy	McLaren 720S GT3	Team Barbados	+ 1:07.337 ^{1}	1:55.207
14	53	Klemen Jug	BMW M4 GT3	Team Slovenia	+ 1:07.908	1:55.642
15	49	Denis Gribov	Audi R8 LMS Evo II	Team Israel	+ 1:10.125	1:55.457
16	7	Andrejs Gubarevs	Porsche 911 GT3 R	Team Latvia	+ 1:21.097	1:55.672
17	35	Mikkel Gade	McLaren 720S GT3	Team Denmark	+ 1:25.139	1:54.360
18	32	Dean Vella	Audi R8 LMS Evo II	Team Malta	+ 1:33.293	1:55.842
19	23	Octavio Pisco	Porsche 911 GT3 R	Team Andorra	+ 1:36.293 ^{2}	1:56.045
20	3	Luca Losio	Lamborghini Huracán GT3 Evo	Team Italy		–

Notes

- ^1 – The driver of car #27 has had 5 seconds added to their total race time
- ^2 – The driver of car #23 has had 5 seconds added to their total race time

=== Final ===
Pos.	No.	Driver name	Car	Team	Gap	Best Lap
1st place, gold medalist(s)	13	James Baldwin	McLaren 720S GT3	Team United Kingdom	–	1:53.610
2nd place, silver medalist(s)	30	Chris Harteveld	McLaren 720S GT3	Team Netherlands	+ 2.942	1:53.382
3rd place, bronze medalist(s)	39	Alberto García	Lamborghini Huracán GT3 Evo	Team Spain	+ 9.275	1:53.917
4	1	Philippa Boquida	McLaren 720S GT3	Team Australia	+ 17.967	1:53.960
5	57	Martin Kadlečík	McLaren 720S GT3	Team Czech Republic	+ 18.089	1:54.097
6	31	Harris Mitropoulos	McLaren 720S GT3	Team Greece	+ 23.958	1:53.907
7	45	Ar Muhammad Aleef	McLaren 720S GT3	Team Singapore	+ 24.544	1:54.127
8	41	Sota Muto	McLaren 720S GT3	Team Japan	+ 25.984	1:54.220
9	21	Igor Rodrigues	McLaren 720S GT3	Team Brazil	+ 33.542	1:54.127
10	55	Presley Martono	McLaren 720S GT3	Team Indonesia	+ 33.997	1:54.217
11	40	Constantin Tscharf	Mercedes-AMG GT3 Evo	Team Germany	+ 42.363	1:54.312
12	42	Bence Bánki	McLaren 720S GT3	Team Slovakia	+ 42.741	1:54.412
13	46	Mathias Kühn	McLaren 720S GT3	Team Belgium	+ 44.522	1:54.302
14	6	Jonathan Wong	Aston Martin Vantage AMR GT3	Team Hong Kong	+ 46.592	1:54.652
15	4	Marcin Świderek	Lamborghini Huracán GT3 Evo	Team Poland	+ 51.140	1:54.512
16	38	Mihael Matika	McLaren 720S GT3	Team Croatia	+ 1:00.659	1:54.587
17	20	Ulas Ozyildirim	McLaren 720S GT3	Team Turkey	+ 1:05.219	1:54.330
18	56	Alexandre Lê	McLaren 720S GT3	Team France	+ 1:16.742	1:54.715
19	52	Naquib Azlan	Ferrari 488 GT3 Evo 2020	Team Malaysia	+ 1:20.641	1:54.737
20	12	Tommy Østgaard	Porsche 911 GT3 R	Team Norway	DSQ ^{1}	1:54.240

Notes

- ^1 – The driver of car #12 has been disqualified from the race
