= 2019 Race of Champions =

Motor racing competition

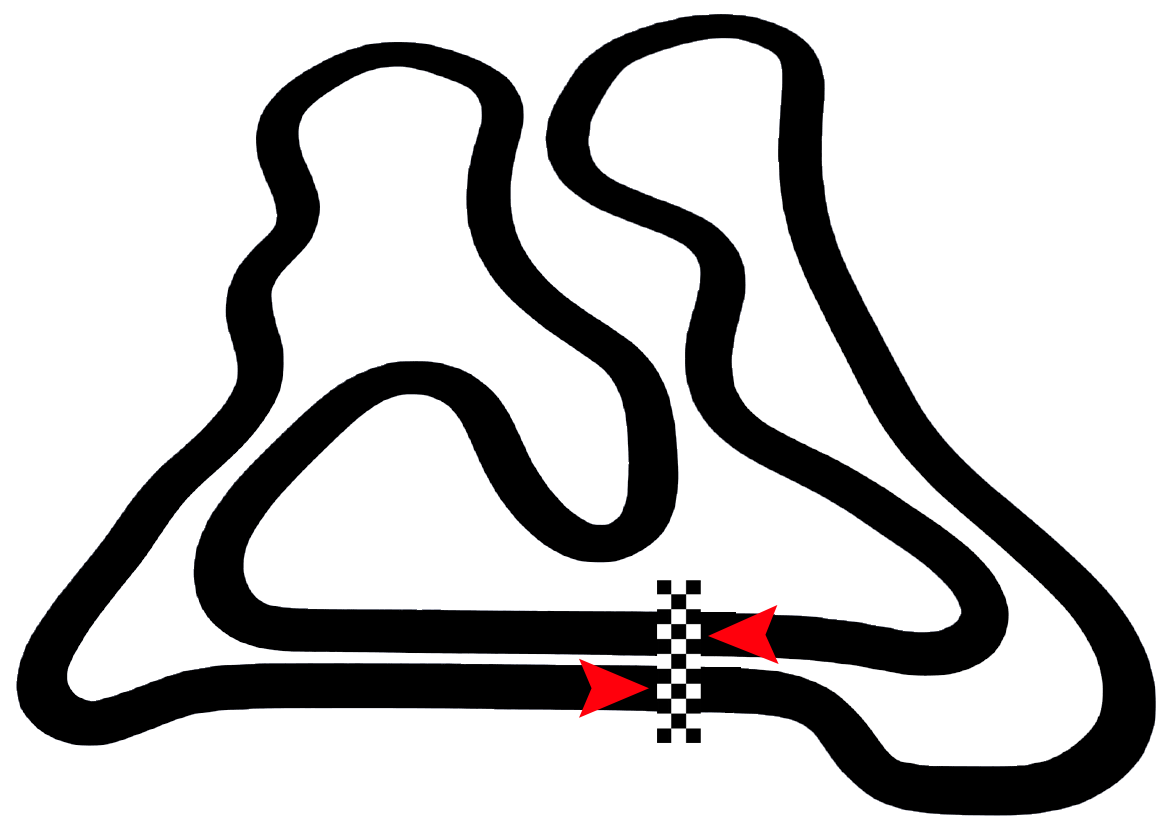
Layout of 2019 Race of Champions

The 2019 Race of Champions was the 30th running of the Race of Champions, and took place on 19–20 January 2019 at Foro Sol inside the Autódromo Hermanos Rodríguez in Mexico. The competition saw local rally driver, Benito Guerra Jr. take the top spot in the individual category beating Loïc Duval in the final.

The Stadium Super Trucks held their 2018 season finale at the event, racing as a standalone series and fielding trucks for ROC competitors. Like ROC, SST used a head-to-head knockout system in which two drivers competed against each other, with the winner advancing to the next round; should a driver lose in the first two rounds, they may proceed if they were the fastest of the defeated drivers as the "Fastest Loser". After three rounds, the final two drivers competed in the final round. Robby Gordon and Matthew Brabham won the weekend's two SST races, the latter also clinching the championship.

== Participants ==
Nations' Cup team	Drivers	2018 series
Germany	Sebastian Vettel	Formula One
Germany	Mick Schumacher	FIA Formula 3 European Championship
United Kingdom	David Coulthard	none
United Kingdom	Andy Priaulx	FIA World Endurance Championship
Mexico	Patricio O'Ward	Indy Lights
Mexico	Esteban Gutiérrez	none
Team Infinitum Mexico	Memo Rojas	European Le Mans Series
Team Infinitum Mexico	Benito Guerra Jr.	World Rally Championship
Team Telcel Mexico	Daniel Suárez	Monster Energy NASCAR Cup Series
Team Telcel Mexico	Rubén García Jr.	NASCAR K&N Pro Series East
Nordic	(Sweden) Johan Kristoffersson	World Rallycross Championship
Nordic	(Denmark) Tom Kristensen	none
Sim Racing All Star	(Italy) Enzo Bonito	2018 Formula One eSports Series
Sim Racing All Star	(United Kingdom) James Baldwin	none
Brazil	Helio Castroneves	WeatherTech SportsCar Championship
Brazil	Lucas di Grassi	Formula E
United States	Ryan Hunter-Reay	IndyCar Series
United States	Josef Newgarden	IndyCar Series
France	Pierre Gasly	Formula One
France	Loïc Duval	FIA World Endurance Championship

== Winners ==
Race of Champions		Nations' Cup winners		Other trophies
Winner	Runner-up	Nation	Drivers	Other trophies
(Mexico) Benito Guerra Jr.	(France) Loïc Duval	(Sweden) (Denmark) Nordic	Johan Kristoffersson; Tom Kristensen	(United Kingdom) James Baldwin (eROC) (Germany) Sebastian Vettel (ROC Skills Challenge); Rubén Garcia Jr. (ROC Mexico Race 1); Abraham Calderón (ROC Mexico Race 2) (United States) Robby Gordon (Stadium Super Trucks Race 1) (Australia) Matthew Brabham (Stadium Super Trucks Race 2)

=== Stadium Super Trucks results ===
**January 19**

Seed	Driver 1	Seed	Driver 2
Round 1
**1**	(United States) **Robby Gordon**	10	(Mexico) Apdaly Lopez
**2**	(United States) **Blade Hildebrand**	9	(United States) Jerett Brooks
**3**	(United States) **Jeff Hoffman**	8	(United States) Casey Mears
**4**	(Australia) **Matthew Brabham**	7	(United States) Cole Potts
5	(United States) Davey Hamilton Jr.	**6**	(United States) **Gavin Harlien**
Round 2
**1**	(United States) **Robby Gordon**	3	(United States) Jeff Hoffman
2	(United States) Blade Hildebrand	**4**	(Australia) **Matthew Brabham**
**6**	(United States) **Gavin Harlien**	7	(United States) Cole Potts
Round 3
**1**	(United States) **Robby Gordon**	6	(United States) Gavin Harlien
**4**	(Australia) **Matthew Brabham**	7	(United States) Cole Potts
Final
**1**	(United States) **Robby Gordon**	4	(Australia) Matthew Brabham

**January 20**

Seed	Driver 1	Seed	Driver 2
Round 1
**4**	(Australia) **Matthew Brabham**	5	(United States) Davey Hamilton Jr.
**2**	(United States) **Blade Hildebrand**	9	(United States) Jerett Brooks
**3**	(United States) **Jeff Hoffman**	8	(United States) Casey Mears
**1**	(United States) **Robby Gordon**	7	(United States) Cole Potts
**6**	(United States) **Gavin Harlien**	10	(Mexico) Apdaly Lopez
Round 2
**1**	(United States) **Robby Gordon**	7	(United States) Cole Potts
2	(United States) Blade Hildebrand	**3**	(United States) **Jeff Hoffman**
**4**	(Australia) **Matthew Brabham**	6	(United States) Gavin Harlien
Round 3
1	(United States) Robby Gordon	**4**	(Australia) **Matthew Brabham**
**3**	(United States) **Jeff Hoffman**	7	(United States) Cole Potts
Final
3	(United States) Jeff Hoffman	**4**	(Australia) **Matthew Brabham**

- **Bold** – Won round
- Italics – Fastest loser
- Seed set by qualifying times
