= James Baldwin (racing driver) =

British racing driver

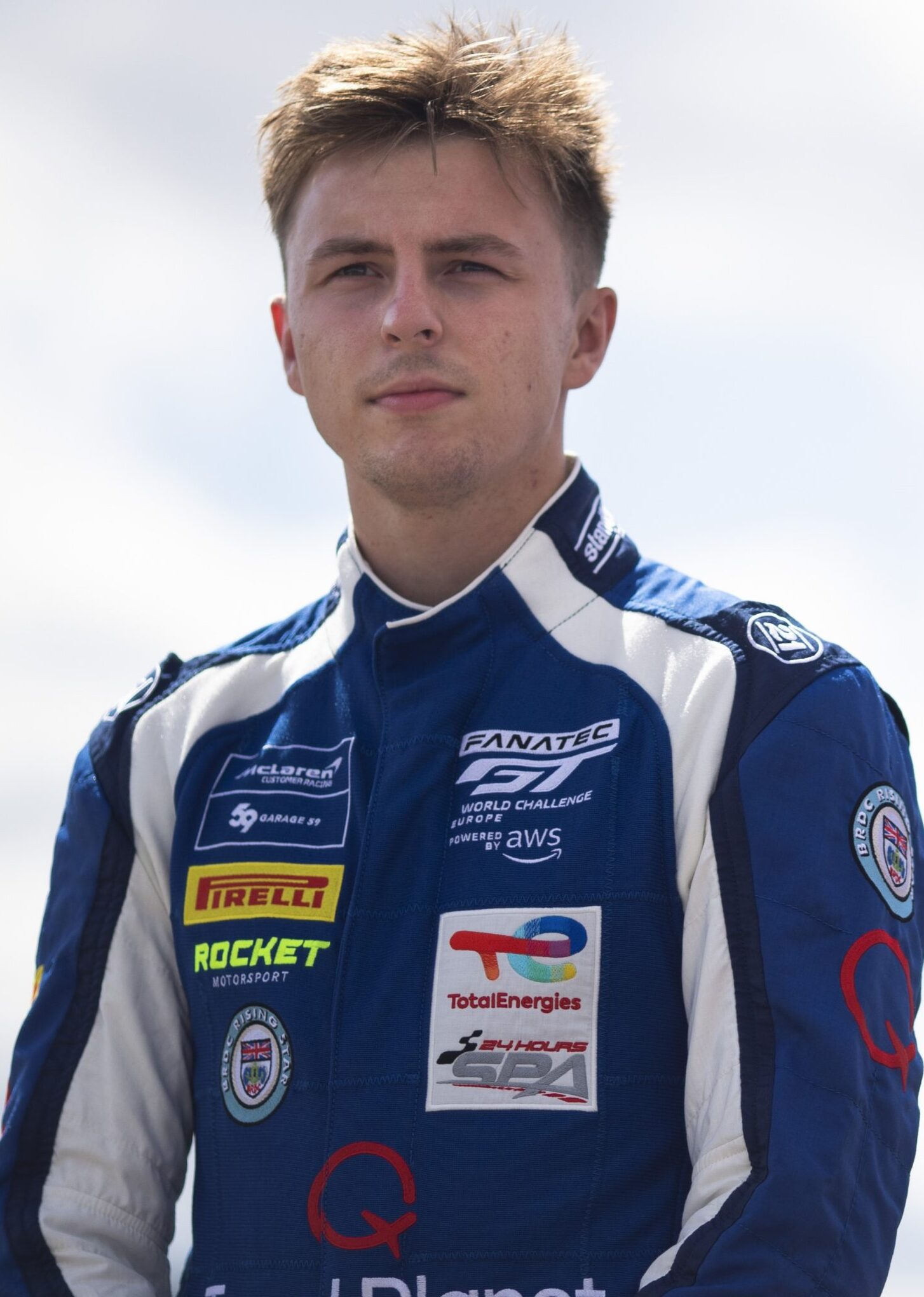
- Baldwin at the 2024 24 Hours of Spa
- Nationality: (United Kingdom) British
- Born: James Robert Baldwin; 28 September 1997 (age 29) Buckinghamshire, England

GT World Challenge Europe career
- Debut season: 2022
- Current team: Garage 59
- Categorisation: FIA Silver
- Car number: 188
- Starts: 6
- Wins: 0
- Podiums: 2
- Poles: 1

Awards
- 2022: Autosport Esports Driver of the Year
Medal record
Sim racing
Representing United Kingdom
Event	1st	2nd	3rd
FIA Motorsport Games	1	–	–
Race of Champions	3	–	–
Total	4	0	0
FIA Motorsport Games
Gold medal – first place	2022 Le Castellet	Esports Cup
Race of Champions
Winner	2019 Mexico City	eROC
Winner	2020 Virtual	Team
Winner	2020 Virtual	eROC

James Robert Baldwin (born 28 September 1997) is a British racing driver, sim racer and content creator. He currently serves as a simulator driver for Mercedes. He is also a member of Verstappen Sim Racing.

After pursuing motor racing early in his career, winning three national karting championships and securing a Formula Ford 1600 drive, Baldwin left the sport due to a lack of funding in 2015. He later switched to sim racing where he saw high levels of success in esports, including winning the second season of the World's Fastest Gamer competition in 2019. Baldwin was awarded a drive in the 2020 British GT Championship with Jenson Team Rocket RJN for his efforts, allowing him to relaunch his career. Since then, he has periodically participated in GT World Challenge Europe events, primarily in McLaren machinery with Garage 59.

== Racing career ==
=== Junior career ===
Baldwin began his racing career in karting aged eight, and won three DMAX National Championships at Daytona Motorsport between 2013 and 2014. He switched to Formula Ford in 2015 and competed in four races. He ran competitively despite having little track time and facing mechanical issues, but was unable to raise the funds to continue racing. He shifted his focus to sim racing and soon found himself invited to professional events with prize money available, offering a chance to reboot his career.

=== British GT Championship ===
On 5 March 2020, Baldwin was announced as a driver for Jenson Team Rocket RJN, partnering team co-owner Chris Buncombe in a McLaren 720S GT3 in the GT World Challenge Europe Endurance Cup. Due to travel difficulties brought about by the COVID-19 pandemic, this was later amended to a full-season entry in the 2020 British GT Championship alongside Michael O'Brien. Baldwin reached national headlines by winning on debut at Oulton Park. The pair went on to take three further podiums and three pole positions, finishing fourth in the overall championship and third in the Silver Cup.

On 29 April 2021, Baldwin was announced as a BRDC Rising Star.

In 2025, Baldwin joined the British GT Championship commentary team, working alongside David Addison and Andy McEwan.

=== GT World Challenge Europe ===
On 20 June 2022, Baldwin announced, via his Instagram account, that he would be racing in the 2022 24 Hours of Spa, with support from company Travel Planet. He joined racing team Garage 59 and drove a McLaren 720S GT3, competing alongside Nicolai Kjærgaard, Manuel Maldonado, and Ethan Simioni, racing in the Silver Cup class. After qualifying 26th overall and 5th in class, ahead of all other McLaren entries, as well as winning the Fanatec Esports GT Pro Series virtual support race, Baldwin failed to finish the race following a radiator problem on lap 227.

On 30 May 2024, via a post on X, Baldwin announced that he would be partaking in the 2024 24 Hours of Spa, reuniting with Garage 59 and driving the newly updated McLaren 720S GT3 Evo. He and his teammates finished 38th overall and 11th in the Bronze Cup class. Following his participation at Spa, Baldwin was called up again by Garage 59 to race in the 3 Hours of Monza, qualifying in 31st, but was forced to retire due to a gearbox failure. He returned for the 6 Hours of Jeddah, finishing 22nd overall and 3rd in the Bronze Cup category, claiming his first-ever GT World Challenge Europe Endurance Cup podium.

Prior to the 2025 Dubai 24 Hour, Baldwin tested a BMW M4 GT3 Evo in a private test session with Paradine Competition, his session plagued with a rear left damper failure. Baldwin tested the same car again at Silverstone Circuit on 5 March in the weeks leading up to the 2025 GT World Challenge Europe season. Baldwin was called up for two races by Garage 59 that year joining Tom Fleming and Guilherme Oliveira at Nürburgring and Circuit de Barcelona-Catalunya, the former of which the trio finished tenth overall and first in Silver Cup, however, their car received a ten-second penalty for a safety car infringement, demoting them to second in class and 18th overall.

== Esports career ==
Baldwin has collected multiple championships on the Assetto Corsa Competizione video game, including the 2021 British GT Esports Championship, 2022 Alpine Esports Series, 2022 Mobileye Intercontinental GT Challenge, and two SRO Esports titles in 2021 and 2022. He has also represented the United Kingdom internationally on the platform, winning a gold medal in the 2022 FIA Motorsport Games Esports Cup.

=== World's Fastest Gamer ===
After spending the last four years in sim racing following his departure from real-world motorsport in 2015 due to lack of funding, his successes resulted in an invitation to Season 2 of World's Fastest Gamer (WFG), a twelve-day intensive competition between sim racers from multiple platforms. Baldwin went on to win the event and was awarded a $1 million sponsorship for a full racing season. He was the first WFG graduate to receive backing for a real-world drive, joining Jenson Team Rocket RJN for the 2020 British GT Championship alongside Michael O'Brien. The competition was televised in a six-part documentary series on ESPN2 and Amazon Prime.

=== Race of Champions ===
Baldwin won the 2019 eROC Invitational Event, gaining entry to the 2019 Race of Champions. There, he won the eROC World Final. The prize was to represent Team Sim Racing All Stars in the Nations Cup, partnering future Formula One eSports Series rival Enzo Bonito. Baldwin returned to ROC for the 2020 edition, held this year as a virtual event. He teamed with Romain Grosjean to win the Nations Cup as Team All Stars, having earned his place by winning the eROC World Final for a second time. After not being held in 2021, Baldwin returned for the 2022 Race of Champions. Following two consecutive qualifications for the main event, he missed out on a slot in the Sim Racing All Stars team for the Nations Cup after losing out to Lucas Blakeley and Jarno Opmeer in the eROC World Final.

=== Formula One Esports ===
Baldwin signed for Alfa Romeo as a third driver for the 2019 Formula One Esports Series. He moved to McLaren for the 2020 Formula One Esports Series, ending the season 17th with a best result of 8th and two fastest laps.

=== Rennsport R1 ===
Baldwin competed in the inaugural season of Rennsport R1 with Mercedes-AMG Petronas Esports Team, paired alongside Graham Carroll, Bono Huis, and Marko Pejic.

YouTube Career

In June 2014, Baldwin created his YouTube channel, uploading his first video in March 2019 racing a 450HP BMW M3 around Silverstone Circuit. Then, 3 days later, he posted a video of, at the time, a world record laptime around Autódromo Hermanos Rodríguez in the Codemasters title F1 2018.

As of the 29th August 2026 , James has amounted 222,000 subscribers on YouTube

== Racing record ==
=== Career summary ===
Season	Series	Team	Races	Wins	Poles	F/Laps	Podiums	Points	Position
2015	Avon Tyres Formula Ford 1600 National - Post 89	?	4	0	0	0	0	5	41st
2020	British GT Championship - GT3	Jenson Team Rocket RJN	9	1	3	0	4	125	4th
2022	GT World Challenge Europe Endurance Cup	Garage 59	1	0	0	0	0	0	NC
2022	GT World Challenge Europe Endurance Cup - Silver	Garage 59	1	0	0	0	0	0	NC
2024	GT World Challenge Europe Endurance Cup	Garage 59	3	0	0	0	0	0	NC
2024	GT World Challenge Europe Endurance Cup - Bronze	Garage 59	3	0	0	0	1	19	23rd
2025	GT World Challenge Europe Endurance Cup	Garage 59	2	0	0	0	0	0	NC
2025	GT World Challenge Europe Endurance Cup - Silver	Garage 59	1	0	1	0	1	19	16th
2026	Formula One	Mercedes-AMG Petronas F1 Team	Simulator driver						

=== Complete British GT Championship results ===
(key) (Races in bold indicate pole position in class) (Races in italics indicate fastest lap in class)

Year	Team	Car	Class	1	2	3	4	5	6	7	8	9	DC	Points
2020	Jenson Team Rocket RJN	McLaren 720S GT3	GT3	OUL; 1; 1	OUL; 2; 6	**DON**; **1**; 8	DON; 2; 9	**BRH**; **1**; 2	**DON**; **1**; 3	SNE; 1; 8	SNE; 2; 6	SIL; 1; 3	4th	125

=== Complete GT World Challenge Europe results ===
==== GT World Challenge Europe Endurance Cup ====
Year	Team	Car	Class	1	2	3	4	5	6	7	Pos.	Points
2022	Garage 59	McLaren 720S GT3	Silver	IMO	LEC	SPA; 6H; 43	SPA; 12H; 50†	SPA; 24H; Ret	HOC	CAT	NC	0
2024	Garage 59	McLaren 720S GT3 Evo	Bronze	LEC	SPA; 6H; 56	SPA; 12H; 52	SPA; 24H; 38	NÜR	MNZ; Ret	JED; 22	23rd	19
2025	Garage 59	McLaren 720S GT3 Evo	Silver	LEC	MNZ	SPA; 6H	SPA; 12H	SPA; 24H	**NÜR**; 18	BAR; 36	16th*	19*

^{*} Season still in progress.

=== Complete Spa 24 Hour results ===
Year	Team	Co-Drivers	Car	Class	Laps	Pos.	Class Pos.
2022	(United Kingdom) Garage 59	(Denmark) Nicolai Kjærgaard (Venezuela) Manuel Maldonado (Canada) Ethan Simioni	McLaren 720S GT3	Silver	227	DNF	DNF
2024	(United Kingdom) Garage 59	(Denmark) Nicolai Kjærgaard (United Kingdom) Chris Salkeld (United Kingdom) Mark Sansom	McLaren 720S GT3 Evo	Bronze	454	38th	11th
