= Daytona Motorsport =

UK-based karting organisation

Daytona Motorsport Ltd is a motorsports company that owns and runs karting circuits in Milton Keynes, Sandown Park and Tamworth (with a location previously in Lydd). It caters for drivers aged 6–80 years old and holds monthly "Inkart" championships. Graduates from the individual circuits include Formula First champion Alex Kapadia, Ginetta Junior champion Will Tregurtha, Formula Renault race winner Ivan Taranov, as well as Robert Huff and Howard Fuller. British GT driver Jordan Albert also originated from this track, as well as several established Super One drivers (mostly in the Cadet classes).

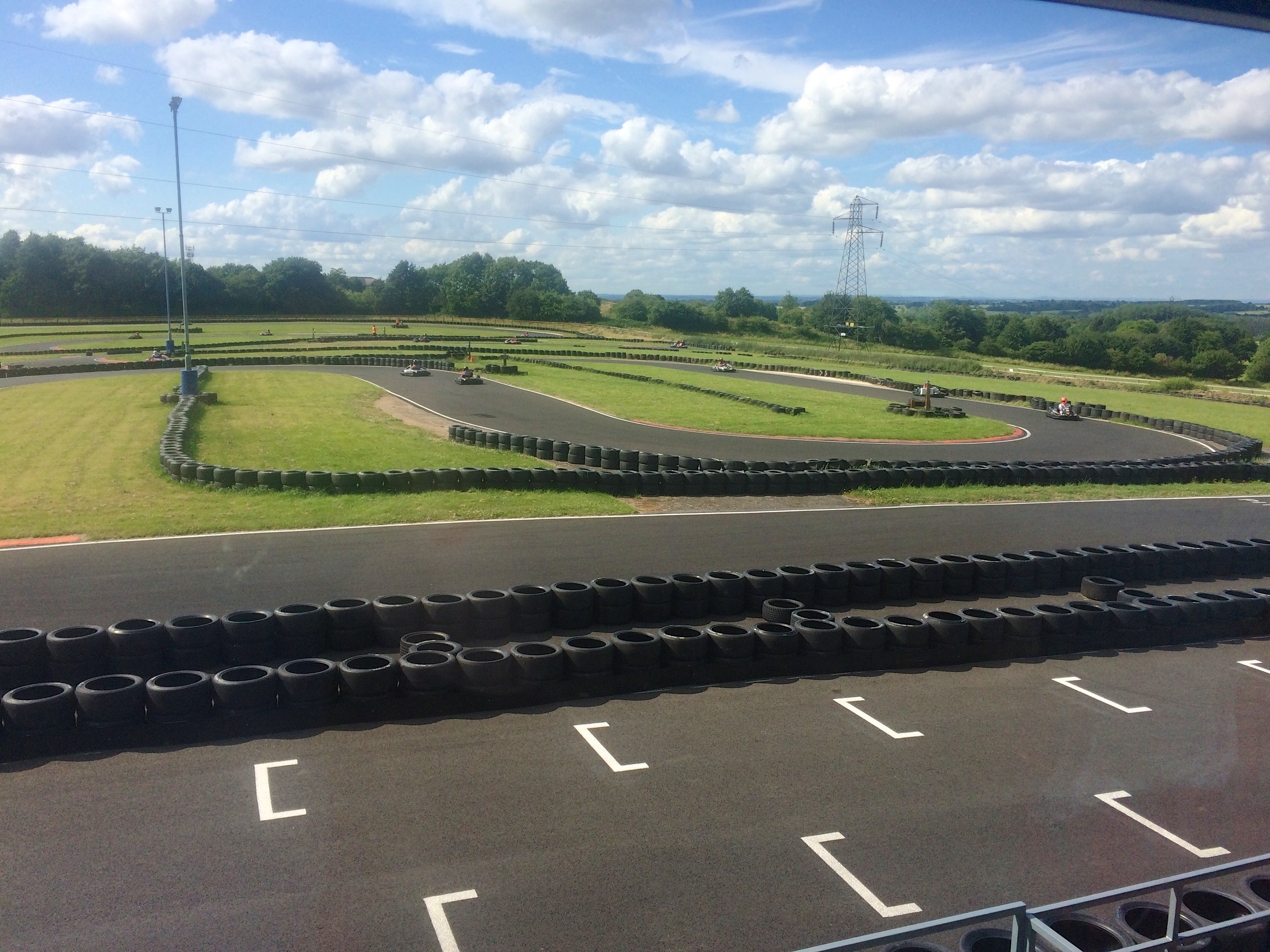
The track at Daytona Tamworth in July 2015

It holds other events, including Daytona's DMAX national championships, as well as corporate karting events.

Daytona Motorsport was founded in 1990 by Charles Graham, the CEO of the Daytona Group.

The organisation was purchased by Brands Hatch Leisure Group in 1998, which was in turn purchased by Octagon in 1999. In June 2003 the founders of Daytona bought back the organisation.

Notable people that have utilised the Daytona circuits include Sam Bird, Viktor Jensen and Duncan Tappy, as well as Formula 1 racers Lewis Hamilton, Martin Brundle, David Coulthard and Damon Hill.

== Venues ==
Daytona's first venue was an indoor circuit at Wood Lane, London, which opened in 1990. It was followed by a second indoor circuit in London in 1992. The two circuits were joined together to form a "GP Circuit" in 1994, which was visited by Tom Cruise, Brad Pitt and Sandra Bullock.

As of 2023, Daytona operates three venues in Milton Keynes, Surrey and Tamworth.

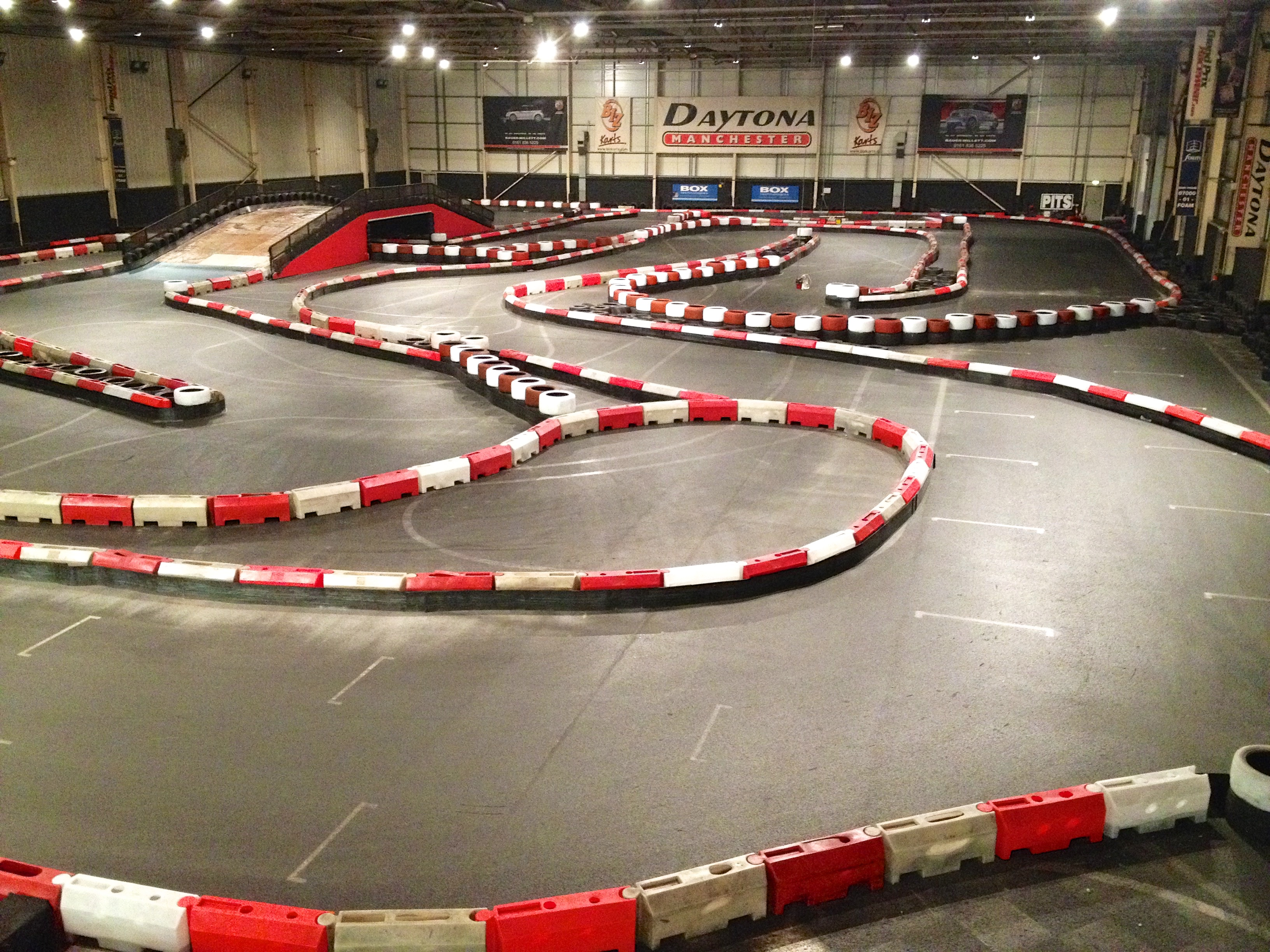
The circuit in Manchester in November 2014.

Daytona's Manchester venue is located near to Old Trafford. The indoor course is located in a purpose-built, heated 50,000 square feet (4,600 m^{2}) venue that opened in October 2000. This venue is no longer owned by Daytona.

The Milton Keynes venue opened in 1996 as "Daytona International". The venue has three outdoor circuits: an "international circuit" with a length of 1,360 metres (4,460 ft) with 11 corners; a "national circuit" with a length of 900 metres (3,000 ft); and the "north circuit" with a length of 375 metres (1,230 ft).

The venue at Sandown Park, Surrey, has two outdoor circuits. Its "GP Circuit" is 900 metres (3,000 ft) long with eight corners and several straights, while its "Indy Circuit" is 475 metres (1,558 ft) long with five corners and some short straights.

The Priory Park track in Tamworth was previously owned by Tamworth Karting, but closed in January 2014 due to a dispute between the company and the owner of the property. It was purchased by Daytona, and was subsequently extended, with opposition by local residents. Daytona also wanted to increase the number of karts on the track from 12 to 30.

At the Milton Keynes and Sandown Park venues, Daytona have a large fleet of Cadet (Honda Single 160cc), Junior (Biz Honda Single 200cc), Senior (Sodi Single 270cc), and DMAX (Birel 2-stroke 125cc) karts to cater for any driver. Their Tamworth venue consists of similar karts yet the Senior 4 strokes use a Birel-N35T chassis and the DMAX utilises a Sodi Sport chassis.

In October 2018, Daytona sold Daytona Manchester, their only indoor facility, to TeamSport Go Karting, to focus on providing racing at their three outdoor tracks. For 2019, Daytona dropped the travelling DMAX Championship to focus on providing racing at their own venues as opposed to travelling to other circuits, much akin to the Club100 brand.

== 2023 SuperChamps Champions ==
Track	Season	DMAX Lightweight	DMAX Heavyweight	4-Stroke Lightweight	4-Stroke Heavyweight
Sandown Park	1	Matthew Boulton	Alex Tucker	Oliver Armiger	Olly Cooper-Welton
Sandown Park	2	Karlis Elmanis	Simon Fuller	Luka Nik	Jamie Welsh
Sandown Park	3	Archie Bullard	Bobby Trundley	Jack Harrison	Kireth Kalirai
Milton Keynes	1	Philip Baboolal	Kuba Wozniak	Jamie Tiley-Gooden	Barry Morris
Milton Keynes	2	James Bettison	Kuba Wozniak	Matthew Glazebrook	Charlie Fenton
Milton Keynes	3	Jamie Tiley-Gooden	Carl Stephens	Harry Asher	Scott Woosey
Tamworth	1	Ben Sanders	Justin Elliott	Olivier Pikula	Hamish Easener
Tamworth	2	Bertie Bream	Mario Nacarlo	Charlie Edge	Baxter Rawlings
Tamworth	3	Dillon Davis	Iain Riley	Jude Beaven	William Emerson

== 2024 SuperChamps Champions ==
Track	Season	DMAX Lightweight	DMAX Heavyweight	4-Stroke Lightweight	4-Stroke Heavyweight
Sandown Park	1	Archie Bullard	William Tidnam	Jack Redfern	Reece Harris
Sandown Park	2	Archie Bullard	William Tidnam	Jules Larkin	Reece Harris
Sandown Park	3	Archie Bullard	William Willard	Ellis McKenzie	Reece Harris
Milton Keynes	1	James Bettison	Lee Witney	Harry Asher	Justin Elliott
Milton Keynes	2	Ethan Pritchard	Lee Witney	Jacob Csepreghi	Scott Woosey
Milton Keynes	3	James King	Ashley Mayston-King	Jacob Csepreghi	Barry Morris
Tamworth	1	Ben Smiles	Greg Chapman	Neil Hampson	Jacob Connellan
Tamworth	2	Alex Jackson	Kristine Kolodziejski	Nikodem Benonski	Kristine Kolodzejski
Tamworth	3	Alex Jackson	Matt Ellis	Benjamin Tomkinson-Gray	Jude Lillyman

== 2025 SuperChamps Champions ==
Track	Season	DMAX Lightweight	Dmax Heavyweight	4-Stroke Lightweight	4-Stroke Heavyweight
Sandown Park	1	Charlie Foster	Henry Lopes-Gracey	Jamie Riches	Sam Roy
Milton Keynes	1	James King	Scott Woosey	Charlie Csepreghi	Freddie Jenkins
Tamworth	1	Joseph Simcock	Antony Wypych	Harry Fitch	Ben Paines

== Race of Champions ==
Year	DMAX	Sodi	Junior	Cadets
2023	Kuba Wozniak	Charlie Fenton	Charlie Csepreghi	Caelen Keith
2024	Dom Balasatis	Andrew Strike	Tom Justice	Alexander Karadzhov

== Daytona Milton Keynes 24 Hour Winners ==
Year	DMAX	Sodi
2011	Red Hot Racing	RDI Pro 1
2012	Red Hot Racing	RDI Pro 1
2013	Red Hot Racing	Titan Motorsport
2014	Reem Team Racing	ANKC
2015	Reem Team Racing	Daytona F1 Superstars
2016	Sign Logic	F1 Superstars
2017	Titan Motorsport	KDS Racing
2017 (Intl)	Young Guns Racing	KDS Racing
2018	KDS Racing	JRG Racing
2018 (Intl)	Versive Racing	Rugby Kart Club
2019	Team Applewood	Brentwood Banta
2020	March Racing	Brentwood Banta
2021	Modernised Racing	BW Racing
2023	Cobra Racing	CI Group Sodi
2024	CI Group One	CSM Racing
2024 (Autumn)	KBR (King Brothers Racing)	CSM Racing
2025	KBR (King Brothers Racing)	DNH Miles-Shelby Squad
2026	KBR (King Brothers Racing)	DNH Miles-Shelby Squad

Reem Team Racing hold the distance record of 1,238 laps, set in May 2014.

2016’s event was held over 25 hours, celebrating 25 years of Daytona Motorsport.

== DMAX National Champions ==
Year	Heats Lightweight	Heats Inter	Heats Heavyweight	Endurance Lightweight	Endurance Inter	Endurance Heavyweight
2012	Chris Hackworth	James Pratt	Chris Carter	Chris Hackworth	James Pratt	Chris Carter
2013	James Baldwin	Joe Holmes	David Vincent	Chris Hackworth	Joe Holmes	David Vincent
2014	James Baldwin	Joe Holmes	Chris Carter	James Baldwin	Joe Holmes	Andrew Knapp
2015	Chris Hackworth	Joe Holmes	Chris Carter	Chris Hackworth	Joe Holmes	Chris Carter
2016	Tom Golding	Lee Hollywood	Chris Carter	Tom Golding	Bobby Trundley	Chris Carter
2017	Axel Slijepcevic	Bobby Trundley	Tomek Zaustowicz	Max O’Shaughnessy	Bobby Trundley	Tomek Zaustowicz
2018	Jack O'Neill	Bobby Trundley	Alex Pritchard	Max O’Shaughnessy	Bobby Trundley	Richard Allen
2025	Jamie Tiley-Gooden	Antony Wypych	Ashley Mayston-King	James King	Kuba Wozniak	Ashley Mayston-King

== Notable drivers ==
- Sam Bird British Racing Driver
- Viktor Jensen Icelandic-British racing driver
- Duncan Tappy English racing driver
- Lewis Hamilton British Racing Driver
- Martin Brundle British racing driver and broadcaster
- David Coulthard British racing driver
- Damon Hill. 1996 Formula 1 World Champion
- Lando Norris Formula 1 Driver
- Carlos Sainz Jr. Formula 1 Driver
