= 2025 Melbourne Formula 2 round =

Motor racing event

(Australia) 2025 Melbourne Formula 2 round
Round details
- Round 1 of 14 in the 2025 FIA Formula 2 Championship.
- Location: Albert Park Circuit; Melbourne, Australia
- Course: Temporary street circuit 5.278 km (3.280 mi)

Sprint Race
- Date: 15 March 2025
- Laps: 23
Podium
First	(Paraguay) Joshua Dürksen	AIX Racing
Second	(Italy) Leonardo Fornaroli	Invicta Racing
Third	(United Kingdom) Luke Browning	Hitech TGR
Fastest lap
Driver	(Italy) Gabriele Minì	Prema Racing
- Time: 1:32.767 (on lap 21)

Feature Race
- Date: 16 March 2025
- Laps: 33
Pole position
Driver	(Italy) Gabriele Minì	Prema Racing
Time	1:29.286	
Podium
First	Race cancelled	N/A
Second	Race cancelled	N/A
Third	Race cancelled	N/A
Fastest lap
Driver	Race cancelled	N/A
- Time: N/A

The 2025 Melbourne FIA Formula 2 round was a motor racing event held between 14 and 16 March 2025 at the Albert Park Circuit. It was the opening round of the 2025 FIA Formula 2 Championship and was held in support of the 2025 Australian Grand Prix.

Due to heavy rain, the feature race on 16 March was cancelled with no racing laps completed.

== Report ==
=== Practice ===
Three red flags were issued during free practice on Friday. Additionally, power cuts that randomly affected several cars resulted in a 15-minute shakedown session being planned for Saturday morning.

=== Qualifying ===
Gabriele Minì claimed pole position, but was demoted due to a grid penalty. As a result, Martins started in first for the feature race. Fornaroli took the sprint pole, after qualifying in eighth.

=== Feature race ===
The feature race was cancelled due to weather conditions. Because less than 2 laps of racing without the safety car occurred, no points were awarded except for two points awarded to Victor Martins for qualifying on pole position.

== Classification ==
=== Qualifying ===
Pos.	No.	Driver	Entrant	Time/Gap	Grid SR	Grid FR
1	10	(Italy) Gabriele Minì	Prema Racing	1:29.286	13^{1}	4^{1}
2	14	(France) Victor Martins	ART Grand Prix	+0.114	7	1
3	11	(United States) Jak Crawford	DAMS Lucas Oil	+0.301	18^{2}	13^{2}
4	6	(Netherlands) Richard Verschoor	MP Motorsport	+0.364	6	2
5	17	(Republic of Ireland) Alexander Dunne	Rodin Motorsport	+0.516	16^{2}	15^{2}
6	2	(Czech Republic) Roman Staněk	Invicta Racing	+0.549	5	3
7	8	(Sweden) Dino Beganovic	Hitech TGR	+0.565	4	5
8	7	(United Kingdom) Luke Browning	Hitech TGR	+0.581	3	6
9	20	(Paraguay) Joshua Dürksen	AIX Racing	+0.652	2	7
10	1	(Italy) Leonardo Fornaroli	Invicta Racing	+0.662	1	8
11	9	(Colombia) Sebastián Montoya	Prema Racing	+0.727	8	9
12	15	(Japan) Ritomo Miyata	ART Grand Prix	+0.731	9	10
13	12	(India) Kush Maini	DAMS Lucas Oil	+0.772	19^{2}	19^{2}
14	4	(United Kingdom) Arvid Lindblad	Campos Racing	+0.803	10	11
15	22	(France) Sami Meguetounif	Trident	+0.953	20^{2}	20^{2}
16	3	(Spain) Pepe Martí	Campos Racing	+0.985	11	12
17	16	(Belgium) Amaury Cordeel	Rodin Motorsport	+1.066	21^{2}	21^{2}
18	25	(Mexico) Rafael Villagómez	Van Amersfoort Racing	+1.370	12	14
19	5	(Germany) Oliver Goethe	MP Motorsport	+2.022	14	16
20	24	(United Kingdom) John Bennett	Van Amersfoort Racing	+2.120	15	17
21	21	(United Kingdom) Cian Shields	AIX Racing	+2.230	17	18
107% time: 1:35.536 (+6.250)
—	23	(United States) Max Esterson	Trident	No time	22^{3}	22^{3}

Notes:

- ^1 – Gabriele Minì set the fastest time in qualifying, but was found guilty of impeding Jak Crawford. He was handed a three-place grid penalty for both races of the weekend. Victor Martins was credited with pole position.
- ^2 – Alexander Dunne, Jak Crawford, Kush Maini, Sami Meguetounif and Amaury Cordeel each received a ten-place grid penalty for a breach of the sporting regulations during pre-season testing.
- ^3 – Max Esterson failed to set a time within the 107%-mark after crashing during qualifying but was given permission from the stewards to start both races from the back of the grid.

=== Sprint race ===
Pos.	No.	Driver	Entrant	Laps	Time/Retired	Grid	Points
1	20	(Paraguay) Joshua Dürksen	AIX Racing	23	41:30.202	2	10
2	1	(Italy) Leonardo Fornaroli	Invicta Racing	23	+2.198	1	8
3	7	(United Kingdom) Luke Browning	Hitech TGR	23	+2.879	3	6
4	6	(Netherlands) Richard Verschoor	MP Motorsport	23	+3.585	6	5
5	2	(Czech Republic) Roman Staněk	Invicta Racing	23	+4.153	5	4
6	9	(Colombia) Sebastián Montoya	Prema Racing	23	+4.611	8	3
7	10	(Italy) Gabriele Minì	Prema Racing	23	+4.877	13	2 (1)
8	3	(Spain) Pepe Martí	Campos Racing	23	+5.486	11	1
9	17	(Republic of Ireland) Alexander Dunne	Rodin Motorsport	23	+9.776	16	
10	4	(United Kingdom) Arvid Lindblad	Campos Racing	23	+10.775	10	
11	5	(Germany) Oliver Goethe	MP Motorsport	23	+11.021	14	
12	15	(Japan) Ritomo Miyata	ART Grand Prix	23	+12.245	9	
13	25	(Mexico) Rafael Villagómez	Van Amersfoort Racing	23	+13.403	12	
14	8	(Sweden) Dino Beganovic	Hitech TGR	23	+15.699	4	
15	16	(Belgium) Amaury Cordeel	Rodin Motorsport	23	+16.744	21	
16	12	(India) Kush Maini	DAMS Lucas Oil	23	+20.120	19	
17	21	(United Kingdom) Cian Shields	AIX Racing	23	+21.976	17	
18	24	(United Kingdom) John Bennett	Van Amersfoort Racing	23	+26.454	15	
DNF	22	(France) Sami Meguetounif	Trident	13	Spun off	20	
DNF	23	(United States) Max Esterson	Trident	5	Spun off	22	
DNF	11	(United States) Jak Crawford	DAMS Lucas Oil	2		18	
DNF	14	(France) Victor Martins	ART Grand Prix	1	Collision damage	7	
Fastest lap set by (Italy) Gabriele Minì: 1:32.767 (lap 21)

== Standings after the event ==
Drivers' Championship standings

Pos.	Driver	Points
1	(Paraguay) Joshua Dürksen	10
2	(Italy) Leonardo Fornaroli	8
3	(United Kingdom) Luke Browning	6
4	(Netherlands) Richard Verschoor	5
5	(Czech Republic) Roman Staněk	4

Teams' Championship standings

Pos.	Team	Points
1	(United Kingdom) Invicta Racing	12
2	(United Arab Emirates) AIX Racing	10
3	(United Kingdom) Hitech TGR	6
4	(Italy) Prema Racing	6
5	(Netherlands) MP Motorsport	5

- Note: Only the top five positions are included for both sets of standings.

== See also ==
- 2025 Australian Grand Prix
- 2025 Melbourne Formula 3 round

Previous round: 2024 Yas Island Formula 2 round	FIA Formula 2 Championship; 2025 season	Next round: 2025 Sakhir Formula 2 round
Previous round: 2024 Melbourne Formula 2 round	Melbourne Formula 2 round	Next round: 2026 Melbourne Formula 2 round
