= 2025 Jeddah Formula 2 round =

Motor racing event

(Saudi Arabia) 2025 Jeddah Formula 2 round
Round details
- Round 3 of 14 in the 2025 FIA Formula 2 Championship.
- Layout of the Jeddah Corniche Circuit
- Location: Jeddah Corniche Circuit; Jeddah, Saudi Arabia
- Course: Temporary street circuit 6.175 km (3.837 mi)

Sprint Race
- Date: 19 April 2025
- Laps: 20
Podium
First	(United Kingdom) Arvid Lindblad	Campos Racing
Second	(Spain) Pepe Martí	Campos Racing
Third	(Republic of Ireland) Alex Dunne	Rodin Motorsport
Fastest lap
Driver	(Netherlands) Richard Verschoor	MP Motorsport
- Time: 1:46.313 (on lap 19)

Feature Race
- Date: 20 April 2025
- Laps: 28
Pole position
Driver	(United States) Jak Crawford	DAMS Lucas Oil
Time	1:43.579	
Podium
First	(Netherlands) Richard Verschoor	MP Motorsport
Second	(United States) Jak Crawford	DAMS Lucas Oil
Third	(France) Victor Martins	ART Grand Prix
Fastest lap
Driver	(Netherlands) Richard Verschoor	MP Motorsport
- Time: 1:45.806 (on lap 27)

The 2025 Jeddah FIA Formula 2 round was a motor racing event held between 18 and 20 April 2025 at the Jeddah Corniche Circuit in Jeddah, Makkah Province, Saudi Arabia. It was the third round of the 2025 FIA Formula 2 Championship and was held in support of the 2025 Saudi Arabian Grand Prix.

== Report ==
=== Qualifying ===
Jak Crawford claimed pole position for the feature race, ahead of Victor Martins and Leonardo Fornaroli. Richard Verschoor achieved reverse-grid pole for the sprint race.

=== Sprint race ===
Richard Verschoor finished the race in first, but was demoted to fourth place after a penalty. As a result, Arvid Lindblad achieved his maiden win, making him the series' youngest winner. Behind him, Pepe Martí finished the race in second, and Alex Dunne finished in third.

=== Feature race ===
Richard Verschoor won the race, ahead of Jak Crawford and Victor Martins, who finished in second and third respectively.

== Classification ==
=== Qualifying ===
Pos.	No.	Driver	Entrant	Time/Gap	Grid SR	Grid FR
1	11	(United States) Jak Crawford	DAMS Lucas Oil	1:43.579	10	1
2	14	(France) Victor Martins	ART Grand Prix	+0.022	9	2
3	1	(Italy) Leonardo Fornaroli	Invicta Racing	+0.092	8	3
4	7	(United Kingdom) Luke Browning	Hitech TGR	+0.158	7	4
5	4	(United Kingdom) Arvid Lindblad	Campos Racing	+0.164	6	5
6	17	(Republic of Ireland) Alex Dunne	Rodin Motorsport	+0.222	5	6
7	3	(Spain) Pepe Martí	Campos Racing	+0.252	3	7
8	10	(Italy) Gabriele Minì	Prema Racing	+0.263	2	8
9	6	(Netherlands) Richard Verschoor	MP Motorsport	+0.337	1	9
10	2	(Czech Republic) Roman Staněk	Invicta Racing	+0.400	4^{1}	13^{1}
11	5	(Germany) Oliver Goethe	MP Motorsport	+0.507	11	10
12	12	(India) Kush Maini	DAMS	+0.574	12	11
13	8	(Sweden) Dino Beganovic	Hitech TGR	+0.582	13	12
14	16	(Belgium) Amaury Cordeel	Rodin Motorsport	+0.615	14	14
15	22	(France) Sami Meguetounif	Trident	+0.686	15	15
16	15	(Japan) Ritomo Miyata	ART Grand Prix	+0.881	16	16
17	9	(Colombia) Sebastián Montoya	Prema Racing	+0.952	17	17
18	20	(Paraguay) Joshua Dürksen	AIX Racing	+0.964	18	18
19	23	(United States) Max Esterson	Trident	+1.327	19	19
20	25	(Mexico) Rafael Villagómez	Van Amersfoort Racing	+1.386	20	20
21	21	(United Kingdom) Cian Shields	AIX Racing	+2.104	21	21
22	24	(United Kingdom) John Bennett	Van Amersfoort Racing	+2.429^{2}	22	22

Notes:

- ^1 – Roman Staněk was originally classified in 10th, but was handed a three-place grid penalty for impeding Alexander Dunne in qualifying.
- ^2 – John Bennett was originally classified in 21st, but had his fastest lap time stripped for causing a red flag. His next fastest time, 1:46.008, classified him in 22nd.

=== Sprint race ===
Pos.	No.	Driver	Entrant	Laps	Time/Retired	Grid	Points
1	4	(United Kingdom) Arvid Lindblad	Campos Racing	20	38:16.059	6	10
2	3	(Spain) Pepe Martí	Campos Racing	20	+0.578	3	8
3	17	(Republic of Ireland) Alex Dunne	Rodin Motorsport	20	+2.087	5	6
4	6	(Netherlands) Richard Verschoor	MP Motorsport	20	+3.492^{1}	1	5 (1)
5	2	(Czech Republic) Roman Staněk	Invicta Racing	20	+3.532	4	4
6	10	(Italy) Gabriele Minì	Prema Racing	20	+4.254	2	3
7	1	(Italy) Leonardo Fornaroli	Invicta Racing	20	+4.403	8	2
8	14	(France) Victor Martins	ART Grand Prix	20	+5.601	9	1
9	7	(United Kingdom) Luke Browning	Hitech TGR	20	+6.185	7	
10	12	(India) Kush Maini	DAMS Lucas Oil	20	+6.672	12	
11	5	(Germany) Oliver Goethe	MP Motorsport	20	+7.361	11	
12	20	(Paraguay) Joshua Dürksen	AIX Racing	20	+7.556	18	
13	9	(Colombia) Sebastián Montoya	Prema Racing	20	+8.244	17	
14	16	(Belgium) Amaury Cordeel	Rodin Motorsport	20	+9.203	14	
15	8	(Sweden) Dino Beganovic	Hitech TGR	20	+10.463	13	
16	22	(France) Sami Meguetounif	Trident	20	+11.113	15	
17	25	(Mexico) Rafael Villagómez	Van Amersfoort Racing	20	+12.226	20	
18	23	(United States) Max Esterson	Trident	20	+15.553	19	
19	15	(Japan) Ritomo Miyata	ART Grand Prix	20	+23.923^{2}	16	
20	24	(United Kingdom) John Bennett	Van Amersfoort Racing	20	+36.266^{3}	22	
DNF	11	(United States) Jak Crawford	DAMS Lucas Oil	15	Collision	10	
DNF	21	(United Kingdom) Cian Shields	AIX Racing	0	Accident	21	
Fastest lap set by (Netherlands) Richard Verschoor: 1:46.313 (lap 19)

Notes

- ^1 – Richard Verschoor finished first on the road, but was given an in-race five second time penalty for forcing another driver off the track. This demoted him to fourth.
- ^2 – Ritomo Miyata was given a ten second time penalty after the race for leaving the track and gaining an advantage. The penalty demoted Miyata, who finished 18th on track, to 19th.
- ^3 – John Bennett was given a ten second time penalty after the race for a safety car infringement. The penalty did not affect his finishing position.

=== Feature race ===
Pos.	No.	Driver	Entrant	Laps	Time/Retired	Grid	Points
1	6	(Netherlands) Richard Verschoor	MP Motorsport	28	51:33.929	9	25 (1)
2	11	(United States) Jak Crawford	DAMS Lucas Oil	28	+1.701	1	18 (2)
3	14	(France) Victor Martins	ART Grand Prix	28	+5.852	2	15
4	1	(Italy) Leonardo Fornaroli	Invicta Racing	28	+6.574	3	12
5	3	(Spain) Pepe Martí	Campos Racing	28	+9.992	7	10
6	7	(United Kingdom) Luke Browning	Hitech TGR	28	+10.607	4	8
7	4	(United Kingdom) Arvid Lindblad	Campos Racing	28	+15.420	5	6
8	17	(Republic of Ireland) Alex Dunne	Rodin Motorsport	28	+16.376^{1}	6	4
9	10	(Italy) Gabriele Minì	Prema Racing	28	+19.518	8	2
10	12	(India) Kush Maini	DAMS Lucas Oil	28	+19.604	11	1
11	20	(Paraguay) Joshua Dürksen	AIX Racing	28	+19.867	18	
12	2	(Czech Republic) Roman Staněk	Invicta Racing	28	+20.654	13	
13	8	(Sweden) Dino Beganovic	Hitech TGR	28	+25.492	12	
14	5	(Germany) Oliver Goethe	MP Motorsport	28	+26.399^{2}	10	
15	16	(Belgium) Amaury Cordeel	Rodin Motorsport	28	+27.313	14	
16	15	(Japan) Ritomo Miyata	ART Grand Prix	28	+27.947	16	
17	25	(Mexico) Rafael Villagómez	Van Amersfoort Racing	28	+33.771	20	
18	23	(United States) Max Esterson	Trident	28	+33.930	19	
19	21	(United Kingdom) Cian Shields	AIX Racing	28	+50.274	21	
20	24	(United Kingdom) John Bennett	Van Amersfoort Racing	27	+1 lap	22	
DNF	9	(Colombia) Sebastián Montoya	Prema Racing	23	Retired	17	
DNF	22	(France) Sami Meguetounif	Trident	7	Retired	15	
Fastest lap set by (Netherlands) Richard Verschoor: 1:45.806 (lap 27)

Notes

- ^1 – Alex Dunne was given a five-second time penalty forcing another driver off track, demoting him from 7th to 8th.
- ^2 – Oliver Goethe was given a five-second time penalty for a safety car infringement, demoting him from 13th to 14th.

== Standings after the event ==
Drivers' Championship standings

	Pos.	Driver	Points
4	1	(Netherlands) Richard Verschoor	53
2	2	(Spain) Pepe Martí	41
2	3	(Italy) Leonardo Fornaroli	40
2	4	(Republic of Ireland) Alex Dunne	35
2	5	(United Kingdom) Luke Browning	33

Teams' Championship standings

	Pos.	Team	Points
1	1	(Spain) Campos Racing	65
2	2	(Netherlands) MP Motorsport	59
	3	(United Kingdom) Invicta Racing	48
3	4	(United Kingdom) Hitech TGR	45
	5	(New Zealand) Rodin Motorsport	35

- Note: Only the top five positions are included for both sets of standings.

== See also ==
- 2025 Saudi Arabian Grand Prix

Previous round: 2025 Sakhir Formula 2 round	FIA Formula 2 Championship; 2025 season	Next round: 2025 Imola Formula 2 round
Previous round: 2024 Jeddah Formula 2 round	Jeddah Formula 2 round	Next round: TBA
