= AIX Racing =

Emirati-German auto racing team

(United Arab Emirates) (Germany) AIX Racing
- Founded: 2024
- Founder(s): AIX Investment Group
- Folded: 2026
- Base: Andernach, Germany
- Team principal(s): Morne Reinecke (CEO); Bob Vavřík (Team Manager); Kenny Kirwan (Team Manager)
- Current series: FIA Formula 2 Championship; FIA Formula 3 Championship
- Current drivers: FIA Formula 2 Championship (Brazil) 20. Emerson Fittipaldi Jr. (United Kingdom) 21. Cian Shields; FIA Formula 3 Championship (Mexico) 26. Ricardo Escotto (Sri Lanka) 27. Yevan David (Brazil) 28. Fernando Barrichello
- Noted drivers: (United Kingdom) Taylor Barnard (United Kingdom) Nikita Bedrin (United States) Brad Benavides (United Kingdom) Freddie Slater
- Website: https://aixracing.com/

AIX Racing is an auto racing team based in Germany. They currently compete in the FIA Formula 2 Championship and the FIA Formula 3 Championship. Owned by Dubai-based AIX Investment Group, it started racing in 2024 after acquiring PHM Racing's Formula 2 and Formula 3 teams. AIX will fold at the end of 2026 after selling selected assets to Lando Norris' new feeder series team, LN4 Fusion.

AIX raced under a German licence in 2024, before becoming an Emirati-flagged team for 2025.

== History ==
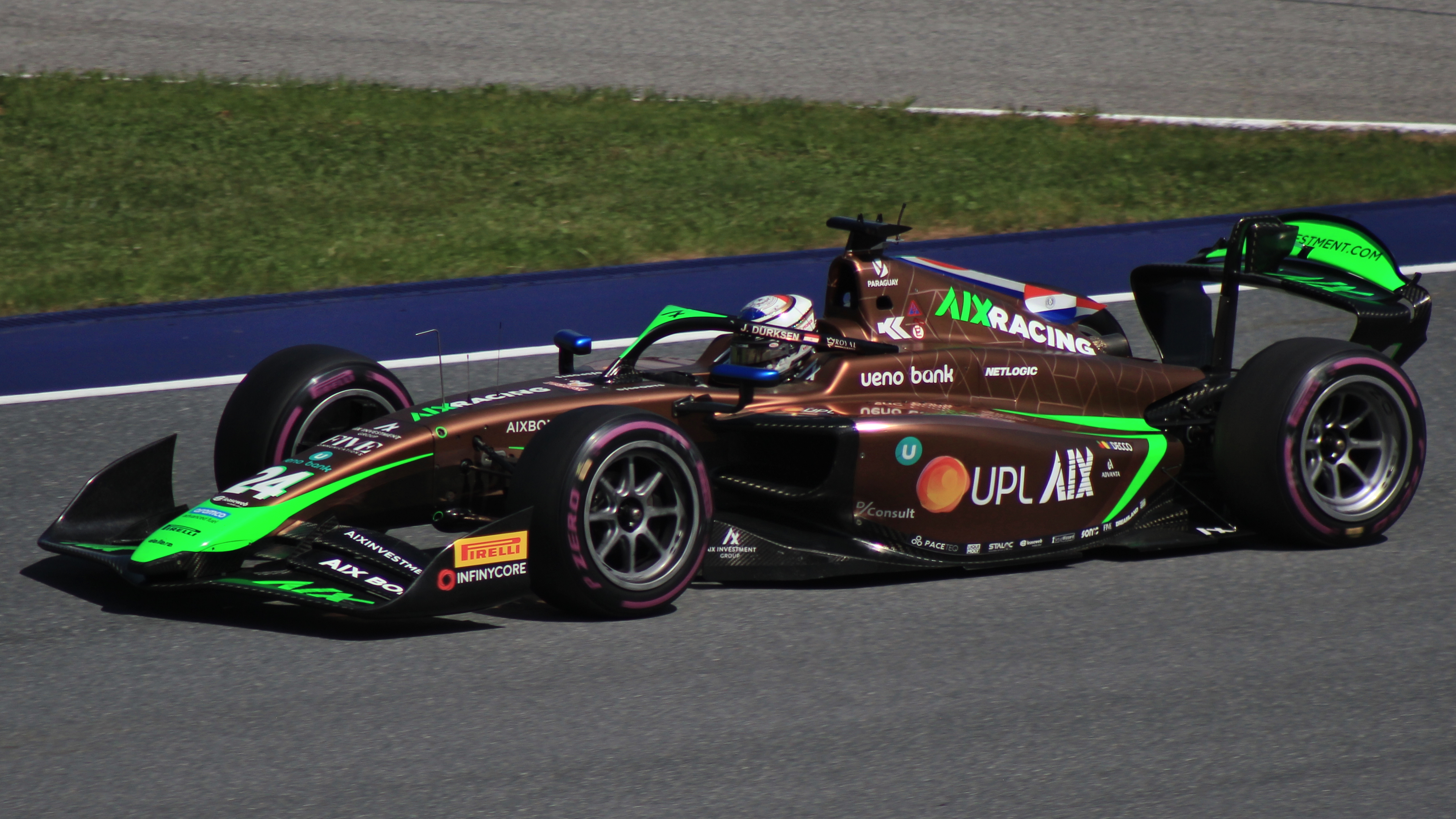
Joshua Dürksen driving an AIX Racing FIA Formula 2 car at the Red Bull Ring (2024)

AIX Racing was formed from PHM Racing's Formula 2 and Formula 3 teams. In 2023, PHM announced a new sponsorship deal with the Dubai-based AIX Investment Group that saw the team renamed PHM AIX Racing for 2024. AIX later completed acquisition of PHM in May 2024 and competed as AIX Racing from the Imola rounds of the F2 and F3 championships.

In round 4 of the 2024 FIA Formula 2 Championship at Imola, AIX got its first podium with Joshua Dürksen finishing third in the feature race. Taylor Barnard then won his and the team's maiden Formula 2 race victory in the sprint race at Monaco. In late August 2024, Barnard, who was the reserve and development driver for McLaren in Formula E, was promoted as a full-time driver for the 2024–25 season and subsequently ended his Formula 2 campaign. He was replaced by Niels Koolen and Cian Shields for two rounds each.

Dürksen won four Formula 2 races for AIX Racing across two years, coming tenth in the standings in 2024 and ninth in 2025 before moving to reigning champions Invicta Racing. Despite finishing 24th with 0 points, Shields was retained by AIX for the 2026 season, where he partnered rookie Emerson Fittipaldi Jr., son of two-time Formula One World Champion Emerson Fittipaldi.

In Formula 3, AIX Racing achieved its only victory in a 1–2 finish at the Hungaroring sprint race in 2024, courtesy of Nikita Bedrin and Tasanapol Inthraphuvasak. AIX then ran as many as eight drivers throughout the 2025 season, with a podium for debutant Freddie Slater in Bahrain and two pole positions for returnee Brad Benavides at Spa and Monza the standout results.

On 2 September 2026, it was announced that Lando Norris was purchasing selected assets of AIX Racing to form his own new feeder series team, LN4 Fusion, in 2027. The next day at Monza, AIX unveiled a new F2 and F3 livery featuring prominent sponsorship from Neutonic, a drinks brand owned by LN4 Fusion CEO Dan Richards.

== Current series results ==
=== FIA Formula 2 Championship ===
Year	Chassis	Engine	Tyres	Drivers	Races	Wins	Poles	F. Laps	Podiums	D.C.	Pts	T.C.	Pts
2024	Dallara; F2 2024	Mecachrome; V634T V6 t	P	(Paraguay) Joshua Dürksen	28	2	0	0	4	10th	87	9th	105
2024	Dallara; F2 2024	Mecachrome; V634T V6 t	P	(United Kingdom) Taylor Barnard	20	1	0	0	1	21st	18	9th	105
2024	Dallara; F2 2024	Mecachrome; V634T V6 t	P	(Netherlands) Niels Koolen	4	0	0	0	0	32nd	0	9th	105
2024	Dallara; F2 2024	Mecachrome; V634T V6 t	P	(United Kingdom) Cian Shields	4	0	0	0	0	30th	0	9th	105
2025	Dallara; F2 2024	Mecachrome; V634T V6 t	P	(Paraguay) Joshua Dürksen	27	2	0	1	8	9th	107	9th	107
2025	Dallara; F2 2024	Mecachrome; V634T V6 t	P	(United Kingdom) Cian Shields	27	0	0	0	0	24th	0	9th	107
2026	Dallara; F2 2024	Mecachrome; V634T V6 t	P	(Brazil) Emerson Fittipaldi Jr.	25	0	0	0	1	18th	28	11th	38*
2026	Dallara; F2 2024	Mecachrome; V634T V6 t	P	(United Kingdom) Cian Shields	25	0	0	2	0	22nd	10	11th	38*

* Season still in progress.

==== In detail ====
(key)

Year	Drivers	1	2	3	4	5	6	7	8	9	10	11	12	13	14	15	16	17	18	19	20	21	22	23	24	25	26	27	28	29	T.C.	Points
2024		BHR; SPR	BHR; FEA	JED; SPR	JED; FEA	ALB; SPR	ALB; FEA	IMO; SPR	IMO; FEA	MCO; SPR	MCO; FEA	CAT; SPR	CAT; FEA	RBR; SPR	RBR; FEA	SIL; SPR	SIL; FEA	HUN; SPR	HUN; FEA	SPA; SPR	SPA; FEA	MNZ; SPR	MNZ; FEA	BAK; SPR	BAK; FEA	LUS; SPR	LUS; FEA	YMC; SPR	YMC; FEA		9th	105
2024	(Paraguay) Joshua Dürksen	15	11	9	12	17	Ret	Ret	3	18	18†	10	Ret	8	6	16	Ret	18	19	19	10	3	5	1	5	8	13	Ret	1		9th	105
2024	(United Kingdom) Taylor Barnard	Ret	16	13	13	13	16	DSQ	20	1	11	19	Ret	12	8	9	14	7	9	16	13										9th	105
2024	(Netherlands) Niels Koolen																					19	19	20	Ret						9th	105
2024	(United Kingdom) Cian Shields																									18	11	18	18		9th	105
2025		ALB; SPR	ALB; FEA	BHR; SPR	BHR; FEA	JED; SPR	JED; FEA	IMO; SPR	IMO; FEA	MCO; SPR	MCO; FEA	CAT; SPR	CAT; FEA	RBR; SPR	RBR; FEA	SIL; SPR	SIL; FEA	SPA; SPR	SPA; FEA	HUN; SPR	HUN; FEA	MNZ; SPR	MNZ; FEA	BAK; SPR	BAK; FEA	LUS; SPR	LUS; FEA	YMC; SPR	YMC; FEA		9th	107
2025	(Paraguay) Joshua Dürksen	1	C	DSQ	10	12	11	11	13	Ret	Ret	NC	17	2	13	5	20†	11	11	11	12	3	2	9	2^{F}	2	14	2	1		9th	107
2025	(United Kingdom) Cian Shields	17	C	18	22	Ret	19	18	11	Ret	13	12	19	12	Ret	17	14	13	19	21	16	15	Ret	14	18	Ret	20	19	Ret		9th	107
2026		ALB; SPR	ALB; FEA	MIA; SPR	MIA; FEA	MTL; SPR	MTL; FEA	MCO; SPR	MCO; FEA	CAT; SPR	CAT; FEA	RBR; SPR	RBR; FEA	SIL; SPR	SIL; FEA	SPA; SPR	SPA; FEA	HUN; SPR	HUN; FEA	MNZ; SPR	MNZ; FEA	MAD; SPR	MAD; FEA	BAK; SPR	BAK; FE1	BAK; FE2	LUS; SPR	LUS; FEA	YAS; SPR	YAS; FEA	11th	38*
2026	(Brazil) Emerson Fittipaldi Jr.	14	15	Ret	12	5	Ret	17	7	16	19	Ret	14	17	20	14	Ret	20	17	16	20	2	5	18	12	16					11th	38*
2026	(United Kingdom) Cian Shields	19	19	18	Ret	Ret	5	18	17	22	20	16	17	19^{F}	19	Ret	12	16	20	18	16	16^{F}	17	12	Ret	18					11th	38*

* Season still in progress.

=== FIA Formula 3 Championship ===
Year	Chassis	Engine	Tyres	Drivers	Races	Wins	Poles	F. Laps	Podiums	D.C.	Pts	T.C.	Pts
2024	Dallara; F3 2019	Mecachrome; V634 V6	P	(Thailand) Tasanapol Inthraphuvasak	20	0	0	0	1	24th	9	9th	35
2024	Dallara; F3 2019	Mecachrome; V634 V6	P	(Italy) Nikita Bedrin	20	1	0	0	1	19th	25	9th	35
2024	Dallara; F3 2019	Mecachrome; V634 V6	P	(Austria) Joshua Dufek	20	0	0	0	0	28th	1	9th	35
2025	Dallara; F3 2025	Mecachrome; V634 V6	P	(Spain) Javier Sagrera	4	0	0	0	0	34th	0	9th	52
2025	Dallara; F3 2025	Mecachrome; V634 V6	P	(United Kingdom) James Hedley	10	0	0	0	0	28th	7	9th	52
2025	Dallara; F3 2025	Mecachrome; V634 V6	P	(Mexico) José Garfias	2	0	0	0	0	37th	0	9th	52
2025	Dallara; F3 2025	Mecachrome; V634 V6	P	(Brazil) Fernando Barrichello	2	0	0	0	0	35th	0	9th	52
2025	Dallara; F3 2025	Mecachrome; V634 V6	P	(Italy) Nicola Marinangeli	19	0	0	0	0	36th	0	9th	52
2025	Dallara; F3 2025	Mecachrome; V634 V6	P	(Italy) Nikita Bedrin	2	0	0	0	0	21st	17	9th	52
2025	Dallara; F3 2025	Mecachrome; V634 V6	P	(United Kingdom) Freddie Slater	2	0	0	1	1	27th	10	9th	52
2025	Dallara; F3 2025	Mecachrome; V634 V6	P	(United States) Brad Benavides	15	0	2	0	0	20th	18	9th	52
2026	Dallara; F3 2025	Mecachrome; V634 V6	P	(United States) Brad Benavides	3	0	0	0	0	25th	6	10th	43
2026	Dallara; F3 2025	Mecachrome; V634 V6	P	(Mexico) Ricardo Escotto	8	0	0	0	0	31st	0	10th	43
2026	Dallara; F3 2025	Mecachrome; V634 V6	P	(Colombia) Salim Hanna	4	0	0	0	0	35th	0	10th	43
2026	Dallara; F3 2025	Mecachrome; V634 V6	P	(Sri Lanka) Yevan David	19	0	0	0	1	18th	35	10th	43
2026	Dallara; F3 2025	Mecachrome; V634 V6	P	(Brazil) Fernando Barrichello	19	0	0	0	0	28th	2	10th	43

==== In detail ====
(key)

Year	Drivers	1	2	3	4	5	6	7	8	9	10	11	12	13	14	15	16	17	18	19	20	T.C.	Points
2024		BHR; SPR	BHR; FEA	ALB; SPR	ALB; FEA	IMO; SPR	IMO; FEA	MCO; SPR	MCO; FEA	CAT; SPR	CAT; FEA	RBR; SPR	RBR; FEA	SIL; SPR	SIL; FEA	HUN; SPR	HUN; FEA	SPA; SPR	SPA; FEA	MNZ; SPR	MNZ; FEA	9th	35
2024	(Thailand) Tasanapol Inthraphuvasak	16	19	Ret	Ret	Ret	27	17	18	25	26	27	26	20	20	2	14	29	15	21	11	9th	35
2024	(Italy) Nikita Bedrin	13	20	21	8	9	30	Ret	24	Ret	30†	13	Ret	13	9	1	7	13	20	Ret	13	9th	35
2024	(Austria) Joshua Dufek	24	27	22	22	16	22	Ret	20	17	17	25	Ret	23	Ret	22	22	24	14	Ret	10	9th	35
2025		ALB; SPR	ALB; FEA	BHR; SPR	BHR; FEA	IMO; SPR	IMO; FEA	MCO; SPR	MCO; FEA	CAT; SPR	CAT; FEA	RBR; SPR	RBR; FEA	SIL; SPR	SIL; FEA	SPA; SPR	SPA; FEA	HUN; SPR	HUN; FEA	MNZ; SPR	MNZ; FEA	9th	52
2025	(Spain) Javier Sagrera	Ret	15	23	24																	9th	52
2025	(United Kingdom) James Hedley					18	23	Ret	WD			DSQ	26	26	27	24	C	4	22			9th	52
2025	(Mexico) José Garfias									24†	Ret											9th	52
2025	(Brazil) Fernando Barrichello																			17	Ret	9th	52
2025	(Italy) Nicola Marinangeli	20	27	Ret	25	Ret	Ret	19	21	21	23	19	25	28	26	27	C	21	23	20	19	9th	52
2025	(Italy) Nikita Bedrin	6	4																			9th	52
2025	(United Kingdom) Freddie Slater			2^{F}	Ret																	9th	52
2025	(United States) Brad Benavides					12	24	12	Ret	15	24	Ret	9	14	Ret	19	C^{P}	Ret	Ret	26	4^{P}	9th	52
2026		ALB; SPR	ALB; FEA	MCO; SPR	MCO; FEA	CAT; SPR	CAT; FEA	RBR; SPR	RBR; FEA	SIL; SPR	SIL; FEA	SPA; SPR	SPA; FEA	HUN; SPR	HUN; FEA	MNZ; SPR	MNZ; FEA	MAD; SPR	MAD; FE1	MAD; FE2		10th	43
2026	(United States) Brad Benavides	17	7	Ret	WD																	10th	43
2026	(Mexico) Ricardo Escotto					22	23			28	Ret	22	26			22	15					10th	43
2026	(Colombia) Salim Hanna							26	19					24	Ret							10th	43
2026	(Sri Lanka) Yevan David	22	20	21	20	19	27	19	Ret	2	7	16	Ret	11	23	4	4	16	11	10		10th	43
2026	(Brazil) Fernando Barrichello	27	18	20	Ret	17	24	23	Ret	24	27†	20	Ret	9	Ret	Ret	Ret	25	Ret	23		10th	43

== Timeline ==
Current series
FIA Formula 2 Championship	2024–2026
FIA Formula 3 Championship	2024–2026
