= 2025 Monte Carlo Formula 2 round =

Motor racing event

(Monaco) 2025 Monte Carlo Formula 2 round
Round details
- Round 5 of 14 in the 2025 FIA Formula 2 Championship.
- Layout of the Circuit de Monaco
- Location: Circuit de Monaco; Monte Carlo, Monaco
- Course: Street circuit 3.337 km (2.074 mi)

Sprint Race
- Date: 24 May 2025
- Laps: 30
Podium
First	(India) Kush Maini	DAMS Lucas Oil
Second	(Italy) Gabriele Minì	Prema Racing
Third	(United Kingdom) Luke Browning	Hitech TGR
Fastest lap
Driver	(France) Victor Martins	ART Grand Prix
- Time: 1:22.433 (on lap 28)

Feature Race
- Date: 25 May 2025
- Laps: 16 (Note: 16 laps were completed of a scheduled 42.)
Pole position
Driver	(Republic of Ireland) Alex Dunne	Rodin Motorsport
Time	1:21.142	
Podium
First	(United States) Jak Crawford	DAMS Lucas Oil
Second	(Italy) Leonardo Fornaroli	Invicta Racing
Third	(Colombia) Sebastián Montoya	Prema Racing
Fastest lap
Driver	(Sweden) Dino Beganovic	Hitech TGR
- Time: 1:22.813 (on lap 12)

The 2025 Monte Carlo FIA Formula 2 round was a motor racing event held between 23 and 25 May 2025 at the Circuit de Monaco in Monte Carlo, Monaco. It was the fifth round of the 2025 FIA Formula 2 Championship and was held in support of the 2025 Monaco Grand Prix.

Alex Dunne took pole position in the group qualifying format ahead of Victor Martins despite an incident with Rafael Villagómez during the session. Kush Maini won the sprint race ahead of Gabriele Minì and Luke Browning. The feature race was shortened due to a lengthy red flag after Dunne and Martins collided in turn one, with five additional cars also retiring from the race. Jak Crawford took the win ahead of Leonardo Fornaroli and Sebastián Montoya. Browning took the championship lead, three points ahead of Dunne.

== Classification ==
=== Qualifying ===
==== Group A ====
Qualifying for Group A was held on 23 May 2025, at 15:10 local time (UTC+2).

Pos.	No.	Driver	Entrant	Time/Gap	Grid SR	Grid FR
1	14	(France) Victor Martins	ART Grand Prix	1:21.145	9	2
2	6	(Netherlands) Richard Verschoor	MP Motorsport	+0.375	7	4
3	4	(United Kingdom) Arvid Lindblad	Campos Racing	+0.398	5	6
4	10	(Italy) Gabriele Minì	Prema Racing	+0.436	3	8
5	12	(India) Kush Maini	DAMS Lucas Oil	+0.533	1	10
6	20	(Paraguay) Joshua Dürksen	AIX Racing	+0.645	12	12
7	2	(Czech Republic) Roman Staněk	Invicta Racing	+0.764	14	14
8	16	(Belgium) Amaury Cordeel	Rodin Motorsport	+1.076	16	16
9	8	(Sweden) Dino Beganovic	Hitech TGR	+1.154	18	18
10	22	(France) Sami Meguetounif	Trident	+1.185	20	20
11	24	(United Kingdom) John Bennett	Van Amersfoort Racing	+1.842	21	21

==== Group B ====
Qualifying for Group B was held on 23 May 2025, at 15:34 local time (UTC+2).

Pos.	No.	Driver	Entrant	Time/Gap	Grid SR	Grid FR
1	17	(Republic of Ireland) Alex Dunne	Rodin Motorsport	1:21.142	10	1
2	1	(Italy) Leonardo Fornaroli	Invicta Racing	+0.546	8	3
3	9	(Colombia) Sebastián Montoya	Prema Racing	+0.598	6	5
4	11	(United States) Jak Crawford	DAMS Lucas Oil	+0.617	4	7
5	7	(United Kingdom) Luke Browning	Hitech TGR	+0.675	2	9
6	15	(Japan) Ritomo Miyata	ART Grand Prix	+1.037	11	11
7	5	(Germany) Oliver Goethe	MP Motorsport	+1.203	13	13
8	3	(Spain) Pepe Martí	Campos Racing	+1.312	15	15
9	23	(United States) Max Esterson	Trident	+1.504	17	17
10	21	(United Kingdom) Cian Shields	AIX Racing	+3.300	19	19
107% time: 1:26.821 (+5.679)
—	25	(Mexico) Rafael Villagómez	Van Amersfoort Racing	No time^{1}	22	22

Notes:

- ^1Rafael Villagómez failed to set a lap time within 107% of the fastest driver. He was permitted to start both races from the back of the grid.

=== Sprint race ===
The sprint race was held on 24 May 2025, at 14:20 local time (UTC+2).

Pos.	No.	Driver	Entrant	Laps	Time/Retired	Grid	Points
1	12	(India) Kush Maini	DAMS Lucas Oil	30	44:57.639	1	10
2	10	(Italy) Gabriele Minì	Prema Racing	30	+3.705	3	8
3	7	(United Kingdom) Luke Browning	Hitech TGR	30	+7.299	2	6
4	11	(United States) Jak Crawford	DAMS Lucas Oil	30	+10.493	4	5
5	6	(Netherlands) Richard Verschoor	MP Motorsport	30	+11.257	7	4
6	9	(Colombia) Sebastián Montoya	Prema Racing	30	+11.937	6	3
7	1	(Italy) Leonardo Fornaroli	Invicta Racing	30	+13.234	8	2
8	4	(United Kingdom) Arvid Lindblad	Campos Racing	30	+13.766^{1}	5	1
9	17	(Republic of Ireland) Alex Dunne	Rodin Motorsport	30	+27.220	10	(1) (Note: Victor Martins set the fastest lap but did not finish in the top ten, so he was ineligible to score the point for it. Alex Dunne scored the point for setting the fastest lap among those finishing in the top ten.)
10	15	(Japan) Ritomo Miyata	ART Grand Prix	30	+28.677	11	
11	2	(Czech Republic) Roman Staněk	Invicta Racing	30	+31.687	14	
12	5	(Germany) Oliver Goethe	MP Motorsport	30	+31.981^{2}	13	
13	23	(United States) Max Esterson	Trident	30	+33.194	17	
14	16	(Belgium) Amaury Cordeel	Rodin Motorsport	30	+43.613	16	
15	8	(Sweden) Dino Beganovic	Hitech TGR	30	+47.785	18	
16	22	(France) Sami Meguetounif	Trident	30	+1:01.058	20	
17	14	(France) Victor Martins	ART Grand Prix	30	+1:03.597	9	
18	25	(Mexico) Rafael Villagómez	Van Amersfoort Racing	30	+1:11.319^{3}	22	
DNF	3	(Spain) Pepe Martí	Campos Racing	16	Retired	15	
DNF	20	(Paraguay) Joshua Dürksen	AIX Racing	10	Collision	12	
DNF	24	(United Kingdom) John Bennett	Van Amersfoort Racing	10	Accident damage	21	
DNF	21	(United Kingdom) Cian Shields	AIX Racing	2	Collision	19	
Fastest lap: (France) Victor Martins (1:22.433 on lap 28)

Notes:

- ^1Arvid Lindblad was given a ten-second penalty for causing a collision. This demoted him from 3rd to 8th.
- ^2Oliver Goethe was given a ten-second penalty for causing a collision. This demoted him from 9th to 12th.
- ^3Rafael Villagómez was given a ten-second penalty for causing a collision. This demoted him from 17th to 18th.

=== Feature race ===
The feature race was held on 25 May 2025, at 15:45 local time (UTC+2).

Pos.	No.	Driver	Entrant	Laps	Time/Retired	Grid	Points (Note: Partial points were awarded as more than 25% but less than 50% of the scheduled race distance was completed. No point was awarded for fastest lap.)
1	11	(United States) Jak Crawford	DAMS Lucas Oil	16	1:04:00.825	7	13
2	1	(Italy) Leonardo Fornaroli	Invicta Racing	16	+6.693	3	10
3	9	(Colombia) Sebastián Montoya	Prema Racing	16	+8.205	5	8
4	7	(United Kingdom) Luke Browning	Hitech TGR	16	+12.073	9	6
5	4	(United Kingdom) Arvid Lindblad	Campos Racing	16	+12.284^{1}	6	5
6	12	(India) Kush Maini	DAMS Lucas Oil	16	+17.227	10	4
7	2	(Czech Republic) Roman Staněk	Invicta Racing	16	+19.392	14	3
8	16	(Belgium) Amaury Cordeel	Rodin Motorsport	16	+20.121	16	2
9	25	(Mexico) Rafael Villagómez	Van Amersfoort Racing	16	+21.711	22	1
10	5	(Germany) Oliver Goethe	MP Motorsport	16	+37.965	13	
11	24	(United Kingdom) John Bennett	Van Amersfoort Racing	16	+55.541^{2}	21	
12	22	(France) Sami Meguetounif	Trident	16	+1:02.555^{3}	20	
13	21	(United Kingdom) Cian Shields	AIX Racing	16	+1:03.075	19	
DNF	8	(Sweden) Dino Beganovic	Hitech TGR	13	Accident	18	
DNF	20	(Paraguay) Joshua Dürksen	AIX Racing	3	Accident	12	
DNF	17	(Republic of Ireland) Alex Dunne	Rodin Motorsport	0	Collision	1	(2)
DNF	14	(France) Victor Martins	ART Grand Prix	0	Collision	2	
DNF	6	(Netherlands) Richard Verschoor	MP Motorsport	0	Collision	4	
DNF	10	(Italy) Gabriele Minì	Prema Racing	0	Collision	8	
DNF	15	(Japan) Ritomo Miyata	ART Grand Prix	0	Collision	11	
DNF	3	(Spain) Pepe Martí	Campos Racing	0	Collision	15	
DNF	23	(United States) Max Esterson	Trident	0	Collision	17	
Fastest lap: (Sweden) Dino Beganovic (1:22.813 on lap 12)

Notes:

- ^1Arvid Lindblad was given a five-second penalty for speeding in the pit lane. This demoted him from 3rd to 5th.
- ^2John Bennett was given a five-second penalty for being below the safety car delta time. This did not affect his finishing position.
- ^3Sami Meguetounif was given a five-second penalty for speeding in the pit lane, and a five-second penalty for being below the safety car delta time. This did not affect his finishing position.

== Standings after the event ==
Drivers' Championship standings

	Pos.	Driver	Points
1	1	(United Kingdom) Luke Browning	70
1	2	(Republic of Ireland) Alex Dunne	67
1	3	(Italy) Leonardo Fornaroli	64
1	4	(Netherlands) Richard Verschoor	59
2	5	(United States) Jak Crawford	56

Teams' Championship standings

	Pos.	Team	Points
	1	(United Kingdom) Hitech TGR	99
	2	(Spain) Campos Racing	92
2	3	(United Kingdom) Invicta Racing	76
2	4	(France) DAMS Lucas Oil	71
2	5	(Netherlands) MP Motorsport	71

Note: Only the top five positions are included for both sets of standings.

== See also ==
- 2025 Monaco Grand Prix
- 2025 Monte Carlo Formula 3 round

== Notes ==
Previous round: 2025 Imola Formula 2 round	FIA Formula 2 Championship; 2025 season	Next round: 2025 Barcelona Formula 2 round
Previous round: 2024 Monte Carlo Formula 2 round	Monte Carlo Formula 2 round	Next round: 2026 Monte Carlo Formula 2 round
