= 2025 Spa-Francorchamps Formula 2 round =

Motor racing event

(Belgium) 2025 Spa-Francorchamps Formula 2 round
Round details
- Round 9 of 14 in the 2025 FIA Formula 2 Championship.
- Layout of Circuit de Spa-Francorchamps
- Location: Circuit de Spa-Francorchamps; Stavelot, Belgium
- Course: Permanent racing facility 7.004 km (4.352 mi)

Sprint Race
- Date: 26 July 2025
- Laps: 18
Podium
| First | (Italy) Leonardo Fornaroli | Invicta Racing |
| Second | (France) Victor Martins | ART Grand Prix |
| Third | (Italy) Gabriele Minì | Prema Racing |
Fastest lap
| Driver | (United Kingdom) Arvid Lindblad | Campos Racing |
- Time: 2:00.679 (on lap 15)

Feature Race
- Date: 27 July 2025
- Laps: 19 (25 scheduled)
Pole position
| Driver | (Republic of Ireland) Alex Dunne | Rodin Motorsport |
| Time | 1:57.151 | |
Podium
| First | (Czech Republic) Roman Staněk | Invicta Racing |
| Second | (Japan) Ritomo Miyata | ART Grand Prix |
| Third | (United Kingdom) Luke Browning | Hitech TGR |
Fastest lap
| Driver | (Sweden) Dino Beganovic | Hitech TGR |
- Time: 2:17.910 (on lap 12)

The 2025 Spa-Francorchamps FIA Formula 2 round was a motor racing event held between 25 and 27 July 2025 at Circuit de Spa-Francorchamps. It was the ninth round of the 2025 FIA Formula 2 Championship and was held in support of the 2025 Belgian Grand Prix.

Alex Dunne claimed his second pole position of the year, with Oliver Goethe taking reverse-grid pole for the sprint race. Leonardo Fornaroli had the best start, reaching the first corner ahead of Amaury Cordeel and Goethe. Title contenders Richard Verschoor, Luke Browning and Jak Crawford collided on the opening lap, with Browning unable to continue and Verschoor retiring in the pits. Fornaroli kept the lead after a safety car restart. Victor Martins overtook Goethe on lap nine, and Cordeel on lap twelve, although contact between the pair led to Cordeel's retirement. Much of the field chose to box for soft tyres. Minì overtook Goethe for third on the restart, and the soft-tyre runners were unable to pass Goethe before a safety car to recover Sami Meguetounif's car, securing the podium for Fornaroli, Martins and Minì.

The feature race took place in wet conditions. Dunne led the field away, with Roman Staněk initially taking second from Ritomo Miyata, but Miyata reclaimed the position in Les Combes. Staněk jumped Miyata during the pitstops, while Browning spun at pit exit, falling from net fifth to ninth. Miyata and Arvid Lindblad passed Staněk on lap 14, but Miyata spun two laps later and dropped to fourth. A safety car was called when Sebastián Montoya spun on lap 18, and then red-flagged on lap 21 when Goethe suffered an engine failure, with Dunne taking first place ahead of Lindblad and Staněk. After the race, though, Dunne was given a ten-second penalty for not engaging the start set-up procedure at the start of the formation lap, while Lindblad was disqualified for a tyre pressure infringement. This gave Staněk the win, with Miyata and Browning joining him on the podium. Fornaroli took the lead of the championship, three points ahead of Richard Verschoor.

== Classification ==
=== Qualifying ===
Qualifying was held on 25 July 2025, at 15:00 local time (UTC+2).

| Pos. | No. | Driver | Entrant | Time/Gap | Grid SR | Grid FR |
|---|---|---|---|---|---|---|
| 1 | 17 | (Republic of Ireland) Alex Dunne | Rodin Motorsport | 1:57.151 | 10 | 1 |
| 2 | 15 | (Japan) Ritomo Miyata | ART Grand Prix | +0.419 | 9 | 2 |
| 3 | 2 | (Czech Republic) Roman Staněk | Invicta Racing | +0.425 | 7 | 3 |
| 4 | 14 | (France) Victor Martins | ART Grand Prix | +0.437 | 6 | 4 |
| 5 | 4 | (United Kingdom) Arvid Lindblad | Campos Racing | +0.523 | 5 | 5 |
| 6 | 3 | (Spain) Pepe Martí | Campos Racing | +0.548 | 4 | 6 |
| 7 | 1 | (Italy) Leonardo Fornaroli | Invicta Racing | +0.561 | 3 | 7 |
| 8 | 10 | (Italy) Gabriele Minì | Prema Racing | +0.634 | 8^{1} | 8 |
| 9 | 16 | (Belgium) Amaury Cordeel | Rodin Motorsport | +0.716 | 2 | 9 |
| 10 | 5 | (Germany) Oliver Goethe | MP Motorsport | +0.742 | 1 | 10 |
| 11 | 6 | (Netherlands) Richard Verschoor | MP Motorsport | +0.845 | 11 | 11 |
| 12 | 7 | (United Kingdom) Luke Browning | Hitech TGR | +0.891 | 12 | 12 |
| 13 | 8 | (Sweden) Dino Beganovic | Hitech TGR | +1.017 | 13 | 13 |
| 14 | 11 | (United States) Jak Crawford | DAMS Lucas Oil | +1.051 | 14 | 14 |
| 15 | 24 | (United Kingdom) John Bennett | Van Amersfoort Racing | +1.195 | 15 | 15 |
| 16 | 9 | (Colombia) Sebastián Montoya | Prema Racing | +1.203 | 16 | 16 |
| 17 | 23 | (United States) Max Esterson | Trident | +1.319 | 17 | 17 |
| 18 | 25 | (Mexico) Rafael Villagómez | Van Amersfoort Racing | +1.376 | 18 | 18 |
| 19 | 22 | (France) Sami Meguetounif | Trident | +1.416 | 19 | 19 |
| 20 | 12 | (India) Kush Maini | DAMS Lucas Oil | +1.452 | 20 | 20 |
| 21 | 20 | (Paraguay) Joshua Dürksen | AIX Racing | +1.524 | 21 | 21 |
| 22 | 21 | (United Kingdom) Cian Shields | AIX Racing | +2.362 | 22 | 22 |

Notes:

- ^1 Gabriele Minì was given a five-place grid penalty for the sprint race for causing a collision in the previous round.

=== Sprint race ===
The sprint race was held on 26 July 2025, at 13:45 local time (UTC+2).

| Pos. | No. | Driver | Entrant | Laps | Time/Retired | Grid | Points |
|---|---|---|---|---|---|---|---|
| 1 | 1 | (Italy) Leonardo Fornaroli | Invicta Racing | 18 | 41:49.222 | 3 | 10+1 |
| 2 | 14 | (France) Victor Martins | ART Grand Prix | 18 | +0.601 | 6 | 8 |
| 3 | 10 | (Italy) Gabriele Minì | Prema Racing | 18 | +1.271 | 8 | 6 |
| 4 | 5 | (Germany) Oliver Goethe | MP Motorsport | 18 | +2.408 | 1 | 5 |
| 5 | 3 | (Spain) Pepe Martí | Campos Racing | 18 | +2.804 | 4 | 4 |
| 6 | 2 | (Czech Republic) Roman Staněk | Invicta Racing | 18 | +4.405 | 7 | 3 |
| 7 | 17 | (Republic of Ireland) Alex Dunne | Rodin Motorsport | 18 | +4.883 | 10 | 2 |
| 8 | 15 | (Japan) Ritomo Miyata | ART Grand Prix | 18 | +5.647 | 9 | 1 |
| 9 | 24 | (United Kingdom) John Bennett | Van Amersfoort Racing | 18 | +6.734 | 15 | |
| 10 | 11 | (United States) Jak Crawford | DAMS Lucas Oil | 18 | +7.663 | 14 | |
| 11 | 20 | (Paraguay) Joshua Dürksen | AIX Racing | 18 | +8.053 | 21 | |
| 12 | 25 | (Mexico) Rafael Villagómez | Van Amersfoort Racing | 18 | +8.423 | 18 | |
| 13 | 21 | (United Kingdom) Cian Shields | AIX Racing | 18 | +8.933 | 22 | |
| 14 | 23 | (United States) Max Esterson | Trident | 18 | +9.387 | 17 | |
| 15 | 9 | (Colombia) Sebastián Montoya | Prema Racing | 18 | +9.939 | 16 | |
| 16 | 8 | (Sweden) Dino Beganovic | Hitech TGR | 18 | +11.052^{1} | 13 | |
| 17 | 4 | (United Kingdom) Arvid Lindblad | Campos Racing | 18 | +11.477^{2} | 5 | |
| 18 | 22 | (France) Sami Meguetounif | Trident | 16 | Mechanical | 19 | |
| NC | 12 | (India) Kush Maini | DAMS Lucas Oil | 15 | +3 laps | 20 | |
| DNF | 16 | (Belgium) Amaury Cordeel | Rodin Motorsport | 11 | Collision | 2 | |
| DNF | 6 | (Netherlands) Richard Verschoor | MP Motorsport | 1 | Collision damage | 11 | |
| DNF | 7 | (United Kingdom) Luke Browning | Hitech TGR | 0 | Collision | 12 | |
Fastest lap: (United Kingdom) Arvid Lindblad (2:00.679 on lap 15)

Notes:

- Arvid Lindblad set the fastest lap, but did not finish the race in the top ten, so was ineligible to score the bonus point. Leonardo Fornaroli set the fastest lap within the top ten and received the point instead.
- ^1 Dino Beganovic received a five-second time penalty for track limits, demoting him from 9th to 16th.
- ^2 Arvid Lindblad received a five-second time penalty for causing a collision, demoting him from 10th to 17th.

=== Feature race ===
The feature race was held on 27 July 2025, at 10:00 local time (UTC+2).

| Pos. | No. | Driver | Entrant | Laps | Time/Retired | Grid | Points |
|---|---|---|---|---|---|---|---|
| 1 | 2 | (Czech Republic) Roman Staněk | Invicta Racing | 19 | 46:15.274 | 3 | 25 |
| 2 | 15 | (Japan) Ritomo Miyata | ART Grand Prix | 19 | +1.790 | 2 | 18 |
| 3 | 7 | (United Kingdom) Luke Browning | Hitech TGR | 19 | +2.413 | 12 | 15 |
| 4 | 3 | (Spain) Pepe Martí | Campos Racing | 19 | +3.058 | 6 | 12 |
| 5 | 1 | (Italy) Leonardo Fornaroli | Invicta Racing | 19 | +3.651 | 7 | 10 |
| 6 | 10 | (Italy) Gabriele Minì | Prema Racing | 19 | +4.352 | 8 | 8 |
| 7 | 8 | (Sweden) Dino Beganovic | Hitech TGR | 19 | +5.198 | 13 | 6+1 |
| 8 | 14 | (France) Victor Martins | ART Grand Prix | 19 | +7.717 | 4 | 4 |
| 9 | 17 | (Republic of Ireland) Alex Dunne | Rodin Motorsport | 19 | +8.547^{1} | 1 | 2+2 |
| 10 | 16 | (Belgium) Amaury Cordeel | Rodin Motorsport | 19 | +8.717 | 9 | 1 |
| 11 | 20 | (Paraguay) Joshua Dürksen | AIX Racing | 19 | +9.457 | 21 | |
| 12 | 24 | (United Kingdom) John Bennett | Van Amersfoort Racing | 19 | +10.513 | 15 | |
| 13 | 5 | (Germany) Oliver Goethe | MP Motorsport | 19 | +11.546 | 10 | |
| 14 | 25 | (Mexico) Rafael Villagómez | Van Amersfoort Racing | 19 | +12.143 | 18 | |
| 15 | 22 | (France) Sami Meguetounif | Trident | 19 | +16.720 | 19 | |
| 16 | 23 | (United States) Max Esterson | Trident | 19 | +33.906 | 17 | |
| 17 | 11 | (United States) Jak Crawford | DAMS Lucas Oil | 19 | +36.900 | 14 | |
| 18 | 6 | (Netherlands) Richard Verschoor | MP Motorsport | 19 | +38.901 | 11 | |
| 19 | 21 | (United Kingdom) Cian Shields | AIX Racing | 19 | +1:06.338 | 22 | |
| 20 | 12 | (India) Kush Maini | DAMS Lucas Oil | 19 | +1:13.228 | 20 | |
| 21 | 9 | (Colombia) Sebastián Montoya | Prema Racing | 17 | Spun | 16 | |
| DSQ | 4 | (United Kingdom) Arvid Lindblad | Campos Racing | DSQ | Disqualified^{2} | 5 | |
Fastest lap: (Sweden) Dino Beganovic (2:17.910 on lap 12)

Notes:

- ^1 Alex Dunne was given a ten-second time penalty for failing to engage the start set-up procedure at the start of the formation lap. This demoted him from first to ninth.
- ^2 Arvid Lindblad was disqualified for not respecting the minimum tyre pressures. He originally finished second.

== Standings after the event ==
Drivers' Championship standings

| | Pos. | Driver | Points |
|---|---|---|---|
| 3 | 1 | (Italy) Leonardo Fornaroli | 125 |
| 1 | 2 | (Netherlands) Richard Verschoor | 122 |
| 1 | 3 | (United States) Jak Crawford | 116 |
| 1 | 4 | (Republic of Ireland) Alex Dunne | 114 |
| | 5 | (United Kingdom) Luke Browning | 113 |

Teams' Championship standings

| | Pos. | Team | Points |
|---|---|---|---|
| 4 | 1 | (United Kingdom) Invicta Racing | 182 |
| 1 | 2 | (Spain) Campos Racing | 169 |
| | 3 | (United Kingdom) Hitech TGR | 163 |
| 2 | 4 | (France) DAMS Lucas Oil | 142 |
| 1 | 5 | (Netherlands) MP Motorsport | 139 |

Note: Only the top five positions are included for both sets of standings.

== See also ==
- 2025 Belgian Grand Prix
- 2025 Spa-Francorchamps Formula 3 round

| Previous round: 2025 Silverstone Formula 2 round | FIA Formula 2 Championship; 2025 season | Next round: 2025 Budapest Formula 2 round |
| Previous round: 2024 Spa-Francorchamps Formula 2 round | Spa-Francorchamps Formula 2 round | Next round: 2026 Spa-Francorchamps Formula 2 round |
