= 2025 Budapest Formula 2 round =

Motor racing event

(Hungary) 2025 Budapest Formula 2 round
Round details
- Round 10 of 14 in the 2025 FIA Formula 2 Championship.
- Layout of Hungaroring
- Location: Hungaroring; Mogyoród, Hungary
- Course: Permanent racing facility 4.381 km (2.722 mi)

Sprint race
- Date: 2 August 2025
- Laps: 28
Podium
| First | (Spain) Pepe Martí | Campos Racing |
| Second | (Republic of Ireland) Alex Dunne | Rodin Motorsport |
| Third | (United States) Jak Crawford | DAMS Lucas Oil |
Fastest lap
| Driver | (Italy) Gabriele Minì | Prema Racing |
- Time: 1:31.876 (on lap 21)

Feature race
- Date: 3 August 2025
- Laps: 37
Pole position
| Driver | (Czech Republic) Roman Staněk | Invicta Racing |
| Time | 1:28.779 | |
Podium
| First | (Italy) Leonardo Fornaroli | Invicta Racing |
| Second | (Czech Republic) Roman Staněk | Invicta Racing |
| Third | (United States) Jak Crawford | DAMS Lucas Oil |
Fastest lap
| Driver | (Sweden) Dino Beganovic | Hitech TGR |
- Time: 1:31.178 (on lap 30)

The 2025 Budapest Formula 2 round was a motor racing event held between 1 and 3 August 2025 at the Hungaroring, Mogyoród, Hungary. It was tenth race of the 2025 Formula 2 Championship and was held in support of the 2025 Hungarian Grand Prix.

== Report ==
=== Qualifying ===
Roman Staněk took his first Formula 2 pole position for Invicta Racing, followed by teammate Leonardo Fornaroli and DAMS Lucas Oil driver Jak Crawford.

=== Sprint race ===
Pepe Martí lined up on pole for the sprint race as he qualified tenth for the feature race. Alex Dunne started second, with Martí's teammate Arvid Lindblad third. Lindblad overtook Dunne on lap 1, but was unable to overtake Martí. Further behind, feature race polesitter Staněk was spun around by Gabriele Minì, but was able to recover. Minì was given a ten-second time penalty for the incident. Lindblad attempted a pass for the lead on lap 8, but was unsuccessful, and the British driver was overtaken by Dunne on lap 19. Sebastián Montoya's retirement brought out the safety car on lap 22. Martí held off a late attack from Dunne to win the race, with the podium completed by Jak Crawford, who overtook Lindblad on the final lap.

=== Feature race ===
The race began with a rolling start due to rain earlier in the day. Staněk held on to his lead, followed by Fornaroli and Crawford. A virtual safety car was called on lap 6 after Amaury Cordeel suffered an engine failure. Staněk pitted at the end of lap 15. His teammate came in one lap later, and performed a successful overcut to take the effective race lead. Originally, the lead driver on the alternate strategy was Lindblad, who pitted on lap 23, but could only climb to sixth in his soft tyre stint, behind the MP Motorsport car of Richard Verschoor, also on the alternate strategy. Crawford attempted to overtake Staněk several times, but was unsuccessful, and Fornaroli held on to take his first feature race win despite receiving a five-second time penalty for speeding in the pit lane.

== Classification ==
=== Qualifying ===
Qualifying was held on 1 August 2025, at 15:55 local time (UTC+2).

| Pos. | No. | Driver | Entrant | Time/Gap | Grid SR | Grid FR |
|---|---|---|---|---|---|---|
| 1 | 2 | (Czech Republic) Roman Staněk | Invicta Racing | 1:28.779 | 10 | 1 |
| 2 | 1 | (Italy) Leonardo Fornaroli | Invicta Racing | +0.146 | 9 | 2 |
| 3 | 11 | (United States) Jak Crawford | DAMS Lucas Oil | +0.173 | 8 | 3 |
| 4 | 7 | (United Kingdom) Luke Browning | Hitech TGR | +0.250 | 7 | 4 |
| 5 | 20 | (Paraguay) Joshua Dürksen | AIX Racing | +0.313 | 6 | 5 |
| 6 | 5 | (Germany) Oliver Goethe | MP Motorsport | +0.358 | 5 | 6 |
| 7 | 14 | (France) Victor Martins | ART Grand Prix | +0.374 | 4 | 7 |
| 8 | 4 | (United Kingdom) Arvid Lindblad | Campos Racing | +0.434 | 3 | 8 |
| 9 | 17 | (Republic of Ireland) Alex Dunne | Rodin Motorsport | +0.467 | 2 | 9 |
| 10 | 3 | (Spain) Pepe Martí | Campos Racing | +0.522 | 1 | 10 |
| 11 | 6 | (Netherlands) Richard Verschoor | MP Motorsport | +0.578 | 11 | 11 |
| 12 | 10 | (Italy) Gabriele Minì | Prema Racing | +0.625 | 12 | 12 |
| 13 | 16 | (Belgium) Amaury Cordeel | Rodin Motorsport | +0.640 | 13 | 13 |
| 14 | 8 | (Sweden) Dino Beganovic | Hitech TGR | +0.729 | 14 | 14 |
| 15 | 24 | (United Kingdom) John Bennett | Van Amersfoort Racing | +0.824 | 15 | 15 |
| 16 | 25 | (Mexico) Rafael Villagómez | Van Amersfoort Racing | +0.827 | 16 | 16 |
| 17 | 15 | (Japan) Ritomo Miyata | ART Grand Prix | +0.916 | 17 | 17 |
| 18 | 9 | (Colombia) Sebastián Montoya | Prema Racing | +0.987 | 21^{1} | 21^{1} |
| 19 | 22 | (France) Sami Meguetounif | Trident | +1.023 | 18 | 18 |
| 20 | 12 | (India) Kush Maini | DAMS Lucas Oil | +1.147 | 19 | 19 |
| 21 | 23 | (United States) Max Esterson | Trident | +1.192 | 20 | 20 |
| 22 | 21 | (United Kingdom) Cian Shields | AIX Racing | +1.955 | 22 | 22 |

Notes:

- ^1 Sebastián Montoya was given a three-place grid penalty for both races for impeding another driver during qualifying.

=== Sprint race ===
The sprint race was held on 2 August 2025, at 14:15 local time (UTC+2).

| Pos. | No. | Driver | Entrant | Laps | Time/Retired | Grid | Points |
|---|---|---|---|---|---|---|---|
| 1 | 3 | (Spain) Pepe Martí | Campos Racing | 28 | 46:29.807 | 1 | 10+1 |
| 2 | 17 | (Republic of Ireland) Alex Dunne | Rodin Motorsport | 28 | +0.225 | 2 | 8 |
| 3 | 11 | (United States) Jak Crawford | DAMS Lucas Oil | 28 | +1.964 | 8 | 6 |
| 4 | 14 | (France) Victor Martins | ART Grand Prix | 28 | +4.503 | 4 | 5 |
| 5 | 1 | (Italy) Leonardo Fornaroli | Invicta Racing | 28 | +5.116 | 9 | 4 |
| 6 | 6 | (Netherlands) Richard Verschoor | MP Motorsport | 28 | +5.271 | 11 | 3 |
| 7 | 5 | (Germany) Oliver Goethe | MP Motorsport | 28 | +5.565 | 5 | 2 |
| 8 | 8 | (Sweden) Dino Beganovic | Hitech TGR | 28 | +5.969 | 14 | 1 |
| 9 | 12 | (India) Kush Maini | DAMS Lucas Oil | 28 | +7.039 | 19 | |
| 10 | 4 | (United Kingdom) Arvid Lindblad | Campos Racing | 28 | +8.193^{1} | 3 | |
| 11 | 20 | (Paraguay) Joshua Dürksen | AIX Racing | 28 | +8.264 | 6 | |
| 12 | 7 | (United Kingdom) Luke Browning | Hitech TGR | 28 | +8.997^{1} | 7 | |
| 13 | 2 | (Czech Republic) Roman Staněk | Invicta Racing | 28 | +9.109 | 10 | |
| 14 | 10 | (Italy) Gabriele Minì | Prema Racing | 28 | +10.564 | 12 | |
| 15 | 15 | (Japan) Ritomo Miyata | ART Grand Prix | 28 | +11.465 | 17 | |
| 16 | 16 | (Belgium) Amaury Cordeel | Rodin Motorsport | 28 | +11.813 | 13 | |
| 17 | 22 | (France) Sami Meguetounif | Trident | 28 | +12.524 | 20 | |
| 18 | 25 | (Mexico) Rafael Villagómez | Van Amersfoort Racing | 28 | +13.374 | 16 | |
| 19 | 23 | (United States) Max Esterson | Trident | 28 | +13.820 | 18 | |
| 20 | 24 | (United Kingdom) John Bennett | Van Amersfoort Racing | 28 | +13.973^{2} | 15 | |
| 21 | 21 | (United Kingdom) Cian Shields | AIX Racing | 28 | +20.879^{3} | 22 | |
| DNF | 9 | (Colombia) Sebastián Montoya | Prema Racing | 21 | Retired | 21 | |
Fastest lap: (Italy) Gabriele Minì (1:31.876 on lap 21)

Notes:

- Gabriele Minì set the fastest lap of the race, but did not finish within the top ten, so was ineligible to score the bonus point. Pepe Martí set the fastest lap within the top ten and therefore received the bonus point.
- ^1 Arvid Lindblad and Luke Browning both received a five-second time penalty for leaving the track and gaining a lasting advantage. Lindblad was demoted from 4th to 10th, and Browning was demoted from 5th to 12th.
- ^2 John Bennett received a five-second time penalty for forcing another driver off the track. This demoted him from 12th to 20th.
- ^3 Cian Shields received a five-second time penalty for a safety car infringement. This did not affect his final classification.

=== Feature race ===
The feature race was held on 3 August 2025, at 10:00 local time (UTC+2).

| Pos. | No. | Driver | Entrant | Laps | Time/Retired | Grid | Points |
|---|---|---|---|---|---|---|---|
| 1 | 1 | (Italy) Leonardo Fornaroli | Invicta Racing | 37 | 1:00:13.630^{1} | 2 | 25 |
| 2 | 2 | (Czech Republic) Roman Staněk | Invicta Racing | 37 | +2.152 | 1 | 18+2 |
| 3 | 11 | (United States) Jak Crawford | DAMS Lucas Oil | 37 | +4.716 | 3 | 15 |
| 4 | 7 | (United Kingdom) Luke Browning | Hitech TGR | 37 | +6.052 | 4 | 12 |
| 5 | 6 | (Netherlands) Richard Verschoor | MP Motorsport | 37 | +11.505 | 11 | 10 |
| 6 | 4 | (United Kingdom) Arvid Lindblad | Campos Racing | 37 | +22.099 | 8 | 8 |
| 7 | 8 | (Sweden) Dino Beganovic | Hitech TGR | 37 | +22.572 | 14 | 6+1 |
| 8 | 5 | (Germany) Oliver Goethe | MP Motorsport | 37 | +23.080 | 6 | 4 |
| 9 | 17 | (Republic of Ireland) Alex Dunne | Rodin Motorsport | 37 | +23.627 | 9 | 2 |
| 10 | 3 | (Spain) Pepe Martí | Campos Racing | 37 | +24.279 | 10 | 1 |
| 11 | 12 | (India) Kush Maini | DAMS Lucas Oil | 37 | +26.401 | 19 | |
| 12 | 20 | (Paraguay) Joshua Dürksen | AIX Racing | 37 | +31.075 | 5 | |
| 13 | 25 | (Mexico) Rafael Villagómez | Van Amersfoort Racing | 37 | +31.951 | 16 | |
| 14 | 22 | (France) Sami Meguetounif | Trident | 37 | +33.752 | 18 | |
| 15 | 9 | (Colombia) Sebastián Montoya | Prema Racing | 37 | +34.260 | 21 | |
| 16 | 21 | (United Kingdom) Cian Shields | AIX Racing | 37 | +38.558 | 22 | |
| 17 | 10 | (Italy) Gabriele Minì | Prema Racing | 37 | +39.860 | 12 | |
| 18 | 15 | (Japan) Ritomo Miyata | ART Grand Prix | 37 | +42.525 | 17 | |
| 19 | 23 | (United States) Max Esterson | Trident | 37 | +46.194 | 20 | |
| DNF | 24 | (United Kingdom) John Bennett | Van Amersfoort Racing | 16 | Retired | 15 | |
| DNF | 14 | (France) Victor Martins | ART Grand Prix | 8 | Retired | 7 | |
| DNF | 16 | (Belgium) Amaury Cordeel | Rodin Motorsport | 5 | Retired | 13 | |
Fastest lap: (Sweden) Dino Beganovic (1:31.178 on lap 30)

Notes:

- ^1 Leonardo Fornaroli was given a five-second time penalty for speeding in the pit lane. This did not affect his final classification.

== Standings after the event ==
Drivers' Championship standings

| | Pos. | Driver | Points |
|---|---|---|---|
| | 1 | (Italy) Leonardo Fornaroli | 154 |
| 1 | 2 | (United States) Jak Crawford | 137 |
| 1 | 3 | (Netherlands) Richard Verschoor | 135 |
| 1 | 4 | (United Kingdom) Luke Browning | 125 |
| 1 | 5 | (Republic of Ireland) Alex Dunne | 124 |

Teams' Championship standings

| Pos. | Team | Points |
|---|---|---|
| 1 | (United Kingdom) Invicta Racing | 231 |
| 2 | (Spain) Campos Racing | 189 |
| 3 | (United Kingdom) Hitech TGR | 183 |
| 4 | (France) DAMS Lucas Oil | 163 |
| 5 | (Netherlands) MP Motorsport | 158 |

Note: Only the top five positions are included for both sets of standings.

== See also ==
- 2025 Hungarian Grand Prix
- 2025 Budapest Formula 3 round

| Previous round: 2025 Spa-Francorchamps Formula 2 round | FIA Formula 2 Championship; 2025 season | Next round: 2025 Monza Formula 2 round |
| Previous round: 2024 Budapest Formula 2 round | Budapest Formula 2 round | Next round: 2026 Budapest Formula 2 round |
