= 2025 Formula 2 Championship =

Motor racing championship

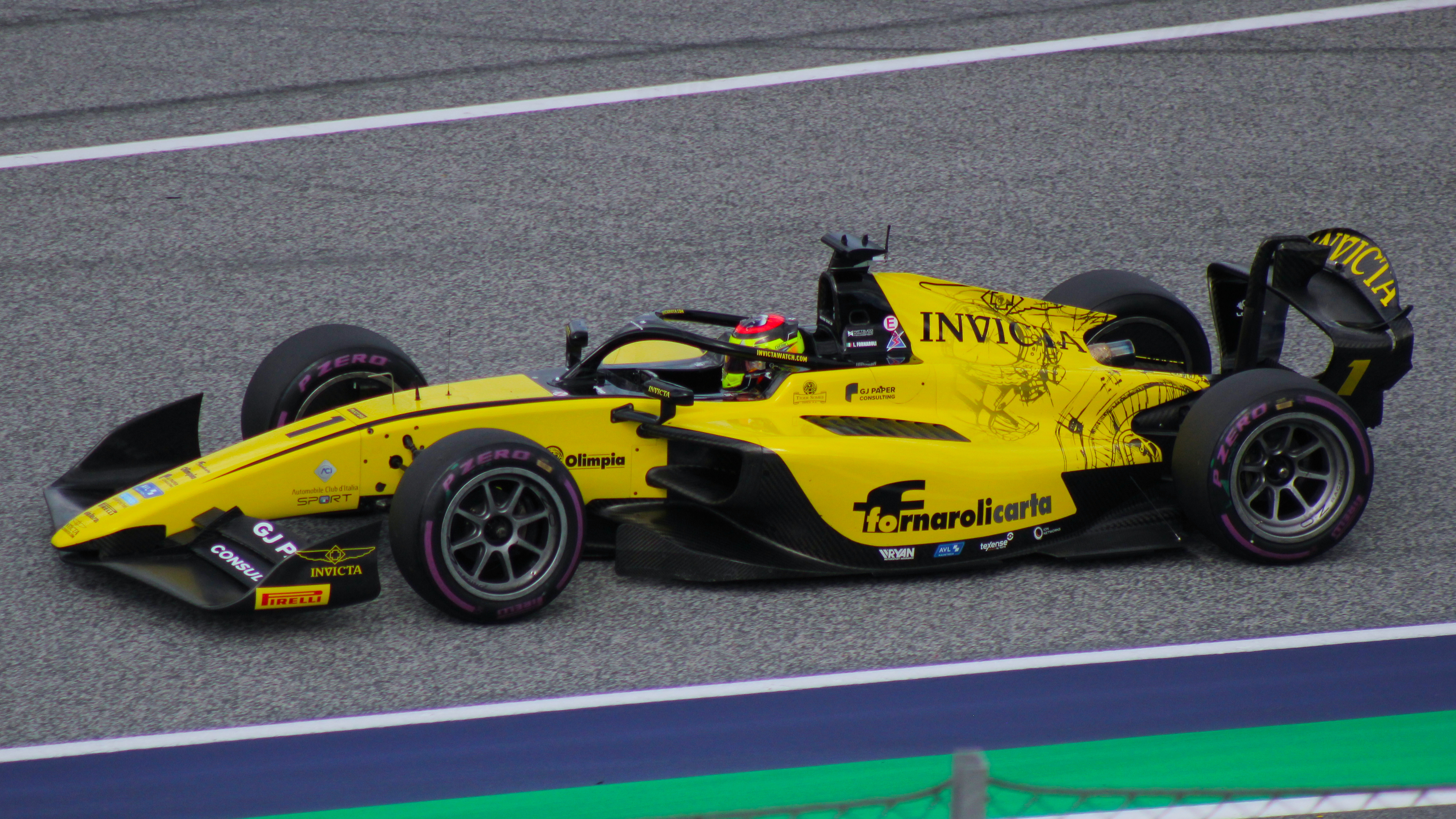
Leonardo Fornaroli became the 2025 Formula 2 Champion, while his team, Invicta Racing, defended their Teams' Championship title.

The 2025 FIA Formula 2 Championship was a motor racing championship for Formula 2 cars sanctioned by the Fédération Internationale de l'Automobile (FIA). The championship was the fifty-ninth season of Formula 2 racing and the ninth season run under the FIA Formula 2 Championship moniker. Formula 2 is an open-wheel racing category serving as the second tier of formula racing in the FIA Global Pathway. The category was run in support of selected rounds of the 2025 Formula One World Championship. As the championship is a spec series, all teams and drivers who competed in the championship ran the same car, the Dallara F2 2024.

Reigning Teams' Champions Invicta Racing defended their title, securing it at the final race of the season in Abu Dhabi. Leonardo Fornaroli became the 2025 Drivers' Champion in the penultimate round of the season in Qatar. By winning the title, Fornaroli became the fifth rookie driver to be crowned Formula 2 Drivers' Champion. Furthermore, he is the fifth driver after Charles Leclerc, George Russell, Oscar Piastri and Gabriel Bortoleto to win both the Formula 2 and FIA Formula 3 Championship titles in consecutive seasons as well as the first Italian Formula 2 champion since the series' introduction in 2017. This is the second year in succession that Invicta Racing provided the Drivers' Champion and won the Teams' Championship, becoming the first team after Prema Racing to repeat this feat.

== Entries ==
The following teams and drivers competed in the 2025 Formula 2 Championship. As the championship is a spec series, all teams competed with an identical Dallara F2 2024 chassis using a V6 turbo engine developed by Mecachrome. All teams competed with tyres supplied by Pirelli.

Team	No.	Driver	Rounds
(United Kingdom) Invicta Racing	1	(Italy) Leonardo Fornaroli	All
(United Kingdom) Invicta Racing	2	(Czech Republic) Roman Staněk	All
(Spain) Campos Racing	3	(Spain) Pepe Martí	1–12
(Spain) Campos Racing	3	(Bulgaria) Nikola Tsolov	13–14
(Spain) Campos Racing	4	(United Kingdom) Arvid Lindblad	All
(Netherlands) MP Motorsport	5	(Germany) Oliver Goethe	All
(Netherlands) MP Motorsport	6	(Netherlands) Richard Verschoor	All
(United Kingdom) Hitech TGR	7	(United Kingdom) Luke Browning	All
(United Kingdom) Hitech TGR	8	(Sweden) Dino Beganovic	All
(Italy) Prema Racing	9	(Colombia) Sebastián Montoya	All
(Italy) Prema Racing	10	(Italy) Gabriele Minì	All
(France) DAMS Lucas Oil	11	(United States) Jak Crawford	All
(France) DAMS Lucas Oil	12	(India) Kush Maini	All
(France) ART Grand Prix	14	(France) Victor Martins	All
(France) ART Grand Prix	15	(Japan) Ritomo Miyata	All
(New Zealand) Rodin Motorsport	16	(Belgium) Amaury Cordeel	1–12
(New Zealand) Rodin Motorsport	16	(Norway) Martinius Stenshorne	13–14
(New Zealand) Rodin Motorsport	17	(Republic of Ireland) Alex Dunne	All
(United Arab Emirates) AIX Racing	20	(Paraguay) Joshua Dürksen	All
(United Arab Emirates) AIX Racing	21	(United Kingdom) Cian Shields	All
(Italy) Trident	22	(France) Sami Meguetounif	1–11
(Italy) Trident	22	(Netherlands) Laurens van Hoepen	12–14
(Italy) Trident	23	(United States) Max Esterson	1–11
(Italy) Trident	23	(Norway) Martinius Stenshorne	12
(Italy) Trident	23	(Australia) James Wharton	13
(Italy) Trident	23	(Thailand) Tasanapol Inthraphuvasak	14
(Netherlands) Van Amersfoort Racing	24	(United Kingdom) John Bennett	All
(Netherlands) Van Amersfoort Racing	25	(Mexico) Rafael Villagómez	All

=== Team changes ===
Hitech Grand Prix and Toyota Gazoo Racing's TGR-DC junior programme formed a new collaboration in 2025, with the team entering under the Hitech TGR guise.

The Invicta Watch Group took full control over Invicta Racing, which split from Virtuosi Racing and underwent management changes.

AIX Racing now competed under an Emirati racing licence for the 2025 season following the use of a German racing licence in 2024. This marked the first time in the championship's history that a Middle Eastern team competed on the grid.

=== Driver changes ===
Reigning Teams' Champions Invicta Racing had an all-new driver lineup as reigning Drivers' Champion Gabriel Bortoleto graduated to Formula One with Sauber, and Kush Maini moved to DAMS. Invicta recruited 2024 FIA Formula 3 Champion Leonardo Fornaroli, who made the full-time step up to Formula 2 after having already raced in the 2024 finale with Rodin Motorsport, and Roman Staněk, who joined the team for his third season in the championship after ending his 2024 campaign with Trident early.

Campos Racing replaced one Red Bull junior with another as Arvid Lindblad, fourth in FIA F3 with Prema Racing in 2024, graduated to F2 to replace 2024 runner-up Isack Hadjar, who graduated to Formula One with Racing Bulls.

MP Motorsport saw both Franco Colapinto and Dennis Hauger depart the team during the 2024 season, with Colapinto leaving ahead of the Monza round to compete in Formula One with Williams Racing for the rest of the 2024 season, and Hauger leaving the team after the Baku round to move to Indy NXT with Andretti Global. The team resigned the two drivers that substituted for Colapinto and Hauger in 2024 for the full 2025 season: Red Bull junior Oliver Goethe, who came seventh in FIA F3 with Campos Racing, and Richard Verschoor, who returned to the team he competed with in 2021 to embark on his fifth season in the championship.

Hitech TGR also entered 2025 with an all-new driver lineup, with Paul Aron joining Alpine F1 Team as a reserve driver and Amaury Cordeel moving to Rodin Motorsport. The team's lineup consisted of two FIA F3 graduates who were already able to collect F2 experience through part-time outings in 2024: Williams Driver Academy member Luke Browning, who finished the FIA F3 season in third also driving for Hitech before a three-round F2 stint for ART Grand Prix, and Ferrari junior Dino Beganovic, who came sixth in FIA F3 with Prema Racing and entered two F2 rounds in 2024 with DAMS Lucas Oil.

Prema Racing were another team with an all-new driver lineup after both Oliver Bearman and Kimi Antonelli graduated to Formula One with Haas and Mercedes, respectively. The team promoted FIA F3 runner-up Gabriele Minì to its F2 outfit, where the Italian already deputised for Bearman for one round in 2024, and Sebastián Montoya, who finished seventeenth in FIA F3 with Campos Racing and returned to the team he raced for in FRECA in 2022.

DAMS Lucas Oil signed Kush Maini, who left Invicta Racing after coming 13th in his second F2 season, to replace Juan Manuel Correa, who had already left the team ahead of the final two rounds of the 2024 season.

ART Grand Prix saw Zak O'Sullivan, who already left the team after the eleventh round of the 2024 season, move to Super Formula with Kondo Racing. The team signed 2023 Super Formula Champion Ritomo Miyata, who finished his rookie F2 season 19th in the standings with Rodin Motorsport, to replace him.

Rodin Motorsport also fully renewed their lineup as Zane Maloney graduated to Formula E with Lola Yamaha ABT, and Ritomo Miyata moved to ART Grand Prix. The team originally signed two FIA F3 graduates in Christian Mansell, who finished fifth in FIA F3 in 2024 with ART Grand Prix and debuted in F2 with Trident during the final three rounds of 2024, and McLaren junior driver Alex Dunne, who made his F2 debut after finishing fourteenth in his FIA F3 campaign with MP Motorsport, becoming the first Irish national to compete in Formula 2. However, Mansell vacated his seat indefinitely for personal reasons ahead of the start of the season, and was replaced by Amaury Cordeel, who finished 17th with Hitech in 2024.

AIX Racing driver Taylor Barnard left the championship after ten rounds of the 2024 season and moved to Formula E to race with NEOM McLaren Formula E Team. 2023 Euroformula Open runner-up Cian Shields, who had already filled Barnard's cockpit during the last two rounds of the 2024 season, replaced him for his full-season debut in 2025.

Trident saw both Verschoor and Staněk leave the team during the 2024 season, with Verschoor joining MP Motorsport ahead of his full-time switch in 2025 and Staněk sitting out the rest of the season before joining Invicta Racing in 2025. The team signed two FIA F3 graduates in Max Esterson, who came 21st with Jenzer Motorsport and already deputised for Verschoor during the final two rounds of 2024, and Sami Meguetounif, who made his F2 debut after finishing eighth with Trident's FIA F3 outfit.

Enzo Fittipaldi left Van Amersfoort Racing and the championship ahead of the final two rounds of the 2024 season to move to the European Le Mans Series with LMP2 team CLX Motorsport. 2024 GB3 runner-up John Bennett, who replaced Fittipaldi for the final two rounds of 2024, remained at the team for his full-time debut.

==== In-season changes ====
Trident fielded a new driver lineup from round twelve onwards as both Sami Meguetounif and Max Esterson parted ways with the team. FIA Formula 3 driver Laurens van Hoepen joined the team for the rest of the season and McLaren junior driver Martinius Stenshorne competed in the Baku round, making their debuts in the championship.

Ahead of the penultimate round in Qatar, Pepe Martí departed Campos Racing in preparation for his step up to Formula E with Cupra Kiro. He was replaced by 2025 FIA F3 runner-up Nikola Tsolov, who joined Campos' F2 outfit ahead of his full-season graduation in 2026. Amaury Cordeel also left the series, and was replaced by 2026 Rodin Motorsport driver Martinius Stenshorne. FIA F3 driver James Wharton made his Formula 2 debut as he replaced Stenshorne at Trident.

FIA F3 race winner Tasanapol Inthraphuvasak made his Formula 2 debut at the final round in Abu Dhabi, replacing Wharton at Trident ahead of a full-time step up with ART Grand Prix in 2026.

== Race calendar ==
Round	Circuit	Sprint race	Feature race
1	(Australia) Albert Park Circuit, Melbourne	15 March	16 March
2	Bahrain International Circuit, Sakhir	12 April	13 April
3	(Saudi Arabia) Jeddah Corniche Circuit, Jeddah	19 April	20 April
4	(Italy) Imola Circuit, Imola	17 May	18 May
5	Circuit de Monaco, Monaco	24 May	25 May
6	(Spain) Circuit de Barcelona-Catalunya, Montmeló	31 May	1 June
7	(Austria) Red Bull Ring, Spielberg	28 June	29 June
8	(United Kingdom) Silverstone Circuit, Silverstone	5 July	6 July
9	(Belgium) Circuit de Spa-Francorchamps, Stavelot	26 July	27 July
10	(Hungary) Hungaroring, Mogyoród	2 August	3 August
11	(Italy) Monza Circuit, Monza	6 September	7 September
12	(Azerbaijan) Baku City Circuit, Baku	20 September	21 September
13	(Qatar) Lusail International Circuit, Lusail	29 November	30 November
14	(United Arab Emirates) Yas Marina Circuit, Abu Dhabi	6 December	7 December

=== Calendar changes ===
- The Albert Park Circuit was the season opener for the first time in Formula 2 history, a consequence of Formula One's Australian Grand Prix holding the opening round of the championship for the first time since 2019.

== Season report ==
A pre-season test was held over three days from 24–26 February at the Circuit de Barcelona-Catalunya. During the test, DAMS, Rodin Motorsport and Trident were found to have illegally modified their cars by drilling into the diffusers to attach sensors. As a result, all six drivers driving for the three teams received ten-place grid penalties for both races of the opening round in Australia.

=== Round 1: Australia ===
The season began at Albert Park Circuit, where Gabriele Minì set the fastest qualifying time. However, he was later penalised for impeding during the session, promoting Victor Martins to feature race pole position. Jak Crawford and Alex Dunne were demoted from their top-five qualifying positions by their penalties from testing, meaning Martins would be followed by Richard Verschoor and Roman Staněk on the feature race grid. Leonardo Fornaroli qualified tenth, therefore starting the reverse-grid sprint race from first place, but was overtaken by Joshua Dürksen at the race start. Martins crashed on the opening lap, and the race was later interrupted by two safety car periods when Trident drivers Max Esterson and Sami Meguetounif spun into the gravel in separate incidents. Dürksen maintained his lead at the restarts to claim victory, his third in the category, followed by Formula 2 debutant Fornaroli in second place and Luke Browning in third.

The feature race was cancelled due to heavy rain. Two attempts were made to start the race, with drivers following the safety car over a number of formation laps, however the session was ultimately red-flagged and not resumed. At the end of the round, Dürksen's sprint race victory left him with a two-point advantage over Fornaroli in the Drivers' Championship.

=== Round 2: Bahrain ===
Leonardo Fornaroli was fastest in qualifying at Bahrain International Circuit, taking feature race pole position, followed by Victor Martins in second and Luke Browning in third. Joshua Dürksen started the sprint race from first place and maintained his lead through the start and through the first safety car interruption to recover Sebastián Montoya's spun car. Dürksen was overtaken by Dino Beganovic on lap 11 but reclaimed the lead at the second safety car restart on lap 19. Battling between the two drivers allowed Richard Verschoor and Pepe Martí to enter the fight for the lead, with Martí passing Verschoor and Beganovic on the penultimate lap and taking first place from Dürksen on the final lap. Martí, who started the race 11th, achieved his second Formula 2 victory, followed over the line by Dürksen and Verschoor. Dürksen was later disqualified from the race for a technical infringement, promoting Beganovic to the podium and Verschoor to the lead of the championship.

Pole-sitter Fornaroli kept his place at the start of the feature race, but was later overtaken on lap seven by Alex Dunne, who started fourth. Luke Browning had qualified third but lost places at the start to drivers who had started on the soft tyre compound. After making his pit stop and changing to the soft compound, he recovered places and overtook Fornaroli and Martins for second place. Fornaroli had lost a position to Martins during the pit stops but later passed him in the closing laps, then held off a challenge by Martí on the final lap, to claim third place. Dunne crossed the line to take victory, his first podium finish in Formula 2. The round ended with Fornaroli leading the championship by one point over Dunne.

=== Round 3: Saudi Arabia ===
Qualifying at Jeddah Corniche Circuit saw Jak Crawford take his first feature race pole position since 2023, with Victor Martins and Leonardo Fornaroli qualifying second and third respectively. Roman Staněk qualified tenth but was demoted by a penalty for impeding, putting Richard Verschoor on sprint race pole position. Gabriele Minì, who started second, dropped out of the podium positions in the opening laps of the sprint race. Pepe Martí briefly took the lead but was soon overtaken by Verschoor and later fell behind Arvid Lindblad, who had gained places from sixth on the grid. During his battle for the lead with Martí, Verschoor was judged to have forced Martí off the track and was issued a five-second time penalty. The safety car was briefly deployed in the closing laps to recover Crawford's spun car, and the leading drivers maintained their positions when racing resumed. Verschoor crossed the finish line first, but was demoted to fourth place by his penalty. Thus, Lindblad claimed his first Formula 2 victory and became the youngest race winner in the championship's history. Martí and Alex Dunne completed the podium.

Pole-sitter Crawford maintained his lead at the start of the feature race. He lost a position to Martins during the pit stops, but soon recovered the place. Verschoor, who started in ninth place, elected for the alternate tyre strategy by starting on the harder compound. He inherited the lead when the front-runners pitted and gained enough time to emerge ahead of Martins when he made his pit stop in the closing laps. Verschoor overtook Crawford on the final lap to claim his fifth victory in Formula 2. This result promoted him to the lead of the championship, 12 points ahead of second-placed Martí.

=== Round 4: Italy (Imola) ===
Dino Beganovic took feature race pole position with the fastest qualifying time at Imola Circuit, followed by Sebastián Montoya and Victor Martins, whilst championship leader Verschoor qualified 19th. Ritomo Miyata started the sprint race from first place, but was overtaken by Jak Crawford off the line and later fell to sixth. Crawford led the rest of the race distance to achieve his third victory in Formula 2. Arvid Lindblad improved from fifth on the grid to finish second, followed by Luke Browning in third.

Beganovic was unchallenged at the start of the feature race as Montoya and Martins both stalled their cars – Montoya on the formation lap and Martins off the start line – which promoted Leonardo Fornaroli to second place. The front-runners made their pit stops in the early laps, during which Alex Dunne took advantage of a delay for Fornaroli to gain a position from him. Luke Browning, who started seventh, pitted a lap later and emerged as the lead runner on that strategy, ahead of Beganovic. Beganovic's failed attempt to overtake Browning allowed Dunne through, after which Dunne overtook Browning as well. Dunne took the victory, his second of the year, with Browning and Beganovic completing the podium. Dunne ended the round as championship leader, six points ahead of Browning.

=== Round 5: Monaco ===
Qualifying at the Circuit de Monaco uses a split group system, where drivers are arranged into Groups A and B with each group of eleven cars conducting their qualifying separately. Championship leader Dunne, in Group B, set the fastest overall time to claim his first Formula 2 pole position. Victor Martins set the fastest time in Group A to qualify second, and Leonardo Fornaroli was third. Kush Maini started the sprint race from pole position. Luke Browning started second, but a slow start dropped him behind Gabriele Minì, Arvid Lindblad and Jak Crawford. Crawford and Lindblad then collided; Lindblad was found at fault and issued a time penalty. Minì followed closely behind Maini for most of the race but was unable to pass, and Maini crossed the finish line to take his second race win in Formula 2. Lindblad slowed down to back up the cars behind him, before speeding up in the closing laps in an attempt to build a gap behind and mitigate the effects of his penalty. The penalty ultimately demoted him to eighth place and promoted Browning to the podium.

Feature race front-row starters Dunne and Martins collided at the first corner, causing a pile-up that eliminated five other drivers and caused the race to be red-flagged. The race later restarted behind the safety car with Fornaroli, Sebastián Montoya and Lindblad as the top three. A crash for Joshua Dürksen on lap seven briefly caused a virtual safety car to be deployed. Dino Beganovic crashed out on lap 14, causing another virtual safety car. The top three drivers had passed the pit lane entry when this was upgraded to a full safety car, allowing fourth-placed Crawford to make his pit stop and emerge ahead of the top three when they pitted one lap later. The race was then red-flagged for a second time on lap 18 due to barrier damage from Beganovic's accident, but was not restarted; reduced points were awarded due to less than 50% of the scheduled race distance being completed. Crawford achieved his fourth win in the category, followed by Fornaroli in second place. Lindblad crossed the line in third, but received a penalty for speeding in the pit lane, promoting Montoya to his first Formula 2 podium finish. Browning, who finished fourth, became the new championship leader at the round's conclusion, three points ahead of Dunne.

=== Round 6: Spain ===
Arvid Lindblad took pole position at Circuit de Barcelona-Catalunya, his first in the category, with Sebastián Montoya and Kush Maini qualifying second and third respectively. Leonardo Fornaroli started the reverse-grid sprint race from the front, but was overtaken by Luke Browning and Jak Crawford at the start, with Crawford going on to take the lead. Teammates Montoya and Gabriele Minì later collided, causing Minì's retirement from the race and prompting a safety car period. A number of drivers including Richard Verschoor, Alex Dunne (who started 19th) and Rafael Villagómez (who started 22nd) opted to pit for fresh soft-compound tyres. These drivers quickly overtook the frontrunners during the final six laps of the race, allowing Verschoor to take his second victory of the season, followed by Dunne in second and Villagómez with his first Formula 2 podium in third.

Lindblad and Montoya held their top two places at the start of the feature race, whilst a poor start from Maini allowed Verschoor to take third place. The top three stayed in the same positions through the pit stops despite an undercut attempt by Montoya. Late in the race, Fornaroli encountered a mechanical issue and retired in the gravel, prompting a safety car, behind which the race finished. Lindblad achieved his second victory of the year with the podium completed by Montoya and Verschoor. Dunne, who finished the race fifth, reclaimed the lead of the championship, three points ahead of Verschoor.

=== Round 7: Austria ===
Leonardo Fornaroli claimed pole position at the Red Bull Ring, the first driver to do so more than once in 2025. Victor Martins and Richard Verschoor qualified second and third respectively. John Bennett started the sprint race from first place, but was overtaken by Joshua Dürksen off the start line. The race was red-flagged on lap four after a collision between Sami Meguetounif, Arvid Lindblad and Luke Browning that resulted in Meguetounif's car rolling over the top of the other two. The drivers were uninjured and the race continued after a 40-minute stoppage. At the restart, a collision between Oliver Goethe and Dino Beganovic caused Beganovic's retirement and the deployment of the safety car. When racing was resumed, Pepe Martí, who had started fifth, caught up to Dürksen and soon passed him for the lead. On the final lap, fourth-placed Amaury Cordeel spun, causing the three cars behind him (Gabriele Minì, Fornaroli and Bennett) to crash into his stationary car. Martí achieved his second race win of the season, followed by Dürksen in second and Roman Staněk in third.

The top three positions in the feature race went unchanged at the start until the pit stops, when pole-sitter Fornaroli lost positions to Martins and Verschoor having pitted later. Verschoor then overtook Martins for the net race lead. Seventh-place starter Alex Dunne had gained positions at the start and later also passed Martins, but was unable to challenge Verschoor. Martins was later overtaken by Martí, but contact during the pass resulted in Martí receiving a time penalty and allowed Fornaroli to pass both drivers for third place. Verschoor took his third victory of the year, followed over the line by Dunne and Fornaroli. However, Dunne was later disqualified for excess plank wear, promoting Jak Crawford, who started the race 14th, to the podium. Verschoor's victory promoted him to the championship lead, 24 points ahead of second-placed Dunne.

=== Round 8: United Kingdom ===
Feature race pole position at Silverstone Circuit was taken by Victor Martins, with Alex Dunne qualifying second and Jak Crawford third. Leonardo Fornaroli started the sprint race on pole position and battled with Kush Maini for first place. Fornaroli reclaimed the lead and then built a gap ahead of second place. Maini dropped back in the closing laps, losing positions to Sebastián Montoya and Roman Staněk. Fornaroli went on to take his first race victory in over four years, having not won a race during his championship-winning FIA Formula 3 campaign the previous year, with Montoya and Staněk completing the podium.

The feature race began in wet conditions. Pole-sitter Martins had a slow start and dropped behind Dunne and Crawford, with Crawford taking the lead. Luke Browning, who started 12th, quickly gained places and overtook Martins for third before the pit stops. The track then dried out enough for the drivers to start changing to slick tyres. Crawford and Browning made their stops and began to gain time relative to Dunne. However, the safety car was then deployed to recover Staněk's car, which had spun and stalled. This allowed Dunne to pit and keep his position between Crawford and Browning. Joshua Dürksen then spun and stalled when racing resumed, triggering another safety car and causing the race to finish behind it. Crawford took his third victory of the year, followed by Dunne and Browning on the podium. Crawford's victory promoted him to second in the championship, six points behind Richard Verschoor, who finished seventh in both Silverstone races.

=== Round 9: Belgium ===
Alex Dunne took his second pole position of the season in qualifying at Circuit de Spa-Francorchamps, followed by Ritomo Miyata in second and Roman Staněk third. At the start of the sprint race, third-place starter Leonardo Fornaroli immediately claimed the lead at the first corner from Oliver Goethe and Amaury Cordeel. A collision at turn 1 eliminated both Luke Browning and Richard Verschoor from the race and caused the safety car to be deployed. After the restart, Victor Martins caught and passed Goethe and then overtook Cordeel, but contact between the two caused Cordeel's retirement and another safety car period. Most drivers outside the top five then elected to pit for new soft-compound tyres, but none were able to break into the podium positions. Fornaroli claimed his second successive sprint race victory, with Martins and Gabriele Minì, who had overtaken Goethe in the closing laps, completing the top three.

Rain caused the feature race to begin with a rolling start from behind the safety car. The top three of Dunne, Miyata and Staněk remained close together in the opening laps, with Miyata and Staněk battling over second place. Staněk took the position during the pit stops, but later fell behind Miyata and Arvid Lindblad. A spin for Miyata then demoted him to fourth place. Race leader Dunne had built a gap behind until the safety car was deployed to recover Sebastián Montoya's car, which had spun and stalled. During the safety car period, Goethe stopped on track with an engine fire, resulting in the race being red-flagged and not resumed with 19 of 23 scheduled laps completed. Dunne finished first, followed by Lindblad and Staněk. However, Dunne was issued a time penalty post-race for not engaging the set-up procedure at the race start, and Lindblad was disqualified for running below the minimum tyre pressure. This promoted Staněk to his first Formula 2 feature race victory, with Miyata and Browning completing the podium. Fornaroli, who was promoted to fifth place in the race, took the lead of the championship by three points over Verschoor, who failed to score at Spa-Francorchamps.

=== Round 10: Hungary ===
Pole position at the Hungaroring was set by Roman Staněk, his first in Formula 2, with Leonardo Fornaroli and Jak Crawford qualifying second and third respectively. Pepe Martí started from the front in the sprint race and was closely followed by Arvid Lindblad for most of the race, with Lindblad briefly taking the lead on lap eight. Lindblad then began to drop back; he was overtaken by Alex Dunne and then by Crawford in the closing laps. Lindblad was later penalised for leaving the track and gaining an advantage, and was demoted to outside of the points positions. Dunne challenged Martí for position on the final lap but was unable to pass, allowing Martí to achieve his third sprint race victory of the season. Dunne and Crawford completed the podium.

The feature race began with a rolling start due to damp track conditions, albeit with all drivers running slick tyres. Staněk maintained his lead from pole until the pit stop phase. Fornaroli stayed out longer and was able to overcut Staněk, emerging ahead once both had pitted, however a lock-up at the pit entry resulted in Fornaroli receiving a five-second penalty for speeding in the pit lane. Crawford caught Staněk in the closing laps but remained third after an unsuccessful overtake attempt. Fornaroli was able to make a gap behind to Staněk such that his penalty did not affect his position, and thus claimed his third race win in three rounds. His victory extended his championship lead to 17 points ahead of Crawford in second place.

=== Round 11: Italy (Monza) ===
Luke Browning took his first Formula 2 pole position in qualifying at Monza Circuit. Richard Verschoor had qualified second but his time was deleted for causing a red flag, meaning second and third went to Kush Maini and Roman Staněk, respectively. Dino Beganovic and Sami Meguetounif started the sprint race on the front row, but both were overtaken by Leonardo Fornaroli and Arvid Lindblad. Max Esterson's car stopping on track brought out the virtual safety car, during which Beganovic received a penalty for a safety car infringement that demoted him from the podium at the finish line. Fornaroli took his fourth win in seven races and was joined on the podium by Lindblad and Joshua Dürksen.

Browning was overtaken by Oliver Goethe in the early laps of the feature race, but Goethe soon made his pit stop. Shortly afterwards, Lindblad collided with Alex Dunne, eliminating Dunne from the race and causing a safety car. The rest of the front-runners then made their pit stops under safety car conditions, which demoted Goethe to eighth place and allowed Browning back into the lead. Upon the restart, front wing damage for Lindblad caused him to go straight on at the first corner, colliding with second-placed Staněk and causing both cars to retire. Dürksen, who had started seventh, overtook Browning for the lead when racing resumed, but Browning regained the position in the closing laps. Browning thus achieved his first victory in Formula 2. Pepe Martí and Rafael Villagómez finished third and fourth having started 13th and 16th, respectively. Browning's victory promoted him to second place in the standings, 21 points behind Fornaroli, who finished the feature race fifth.

=== Round 12: Azerbaijan ===
Pole position at Baku City Circuit was taken by Jak Crawford; championship leader Fornaroli qualified second and Gabriele Minì was third. Rafael Villagómez started from the front in the sprint race but was overtaken by Dino Beganovic and Sebastián Montoya off the start line. Villagómez and Pepe Martí were then eliminated in a collision at the first corner. When racing resumed, Montoya was overtaken for second place by series debutant Martinius Stenshorne, but Stenshorne soon retired with a mechanical issue. Luke Browning then passed Montoya, who then slowed with an apparent car issue, handing third place to Alex Dunne. Beganovic crossed the finish line to take his first Formula 2 victory, followed by Browning and Dunne on the podium.

Fornaroli overtook pole-sitter Crawford at the start of the feature race. A crash by fourth-placed Stenshorne then brought out the safety car, during which every driver stopped to change tyres. Pit lane traffic dropped Fornaroli to fourth place, whilst Minì emerged in the lead ahead of Crawford and Martí. Crawford was soon able to retake the lead. Fornaroli then lost a place to Dunne before colliding with the rear of his car, dropping Dunne down the order and resulting in Fornaroli receiving a time penalty. Joshua Dürksen, who started 15th, made his way up to second place but was unable to pass Crawford, finishing 0.216 seconds behind him at the finish line. Crawford's win was his fourth of the season. Fornaroli recovered to third place but was demoted to fifth by his penalty, promoting Beganovic, who had passed Martí and Minì, to the podium. Crawford's victory put him second in the championship standings, with Fornaroli maintaining his lead by 19 points.

=== Round 13: Qatar ===
With the chance to secure the championship one race early, Fornaroli clinched his third pole position of the season at Lusail International Circuit. Richard Verschoor took reverse grid pole for the sprint, and despite initially being overtaken by Joshua Dürksen at the start, he swiftly regained the lead and maintained it until the end for his fourth win of the season. The race saw two safety car periods: one where rookie James Wharton crashed out on lap 14 after colliding with teammate Laurens van Hoepen, and another on lap 20 when Dürksen's AIX Racing teammate, Cian Shields, spun out on gravel and stalled his car.

Come the feature race, Victor Martins got a better start than Fornaroli and took the lead at the first turn. As the race progressed, Beganovic would inherit the net race lead through his differing strategy. But when the safety car was deployed on lap 15 for Oliver Goethe suffering a mechanical issue, it put him and everyone on his strategy on the same foot, as they were yet to make a pit stop. This allowed Martins' initial lead to be preserved, and he would remain uninterrupted to take what would be his final victory in Formula 2. Behind him, Leonardo Fornaroli finished second to become the 2025 FIA Formula 2 Champion, the first Italian to do so, and the fifth driver to win the Formula 2 title directly after winning the FIA Formula 3 Championship the previous year.

== Results and standings ==
=== Season summary ===
Round		Circuit	Pole position	Fastest lap	Winning driver	Winning team	Report
1	SR	(Australia) Albert Park Circuit		(Italy) Gabriele Minì	(Paraguay) Joshua Dürksen	(United Arab Emirates) AIX Racing	Report
1	FR	(Australia) Albert Park Circuit	(France) Victor Martins (Note: Gabriele Minì set the fastest time in qualifying, but later received a three-place grid penalty for impeding another driver. Victor Martins was promoted to pole position in his place.)	Race cancelled (Note: The race was cancelled due to adverse weather conditions.)			Report
2	SR	Bahrain International Circuit		(India) Kush Maini (Note: Kush Maini set the fastest lap but did not finish in the top ten, so he was ineligible to score the point for it. Oliver Goethe scored the point for setting the fastest lap among those finishing in the top ten.)	(Spain) Pepe Martí	(Spain) Campos Racing	Report
2	FR	Bahrain International Circuit	(Italy) Leonardo Fornaroli	(United Kingdom) Luke Browning	(Republic of Ireland) Alex Dunne	(New Zealand) Rodin Motorsport	Report
3	SR	(Saudi Arabia) Jeddah Corniche Circuit		(Netherlands) Richard Verschoor	(United Kingdom) Arvid Lindblad	(Spain) Campos Racing	Report
3	FR	(Saudi Arabia) Jeddah Corniche Circuit	(United States) Jak Crawford	(Netherlands) Richard Verschoor	(Netherlands) Richard Verschoor	(Netherlands) MP Motorsport	Report
4	SR	(Italy) Imola Circuit		(United Kingdom) Luke Browning	(United States) Jak Crawford	(France) DAMS Lucas Oil	Report
4	FR	(Italy) Imola Circuit	(Sweden) Dino Beganovic	(Italy) Gabriele Minì (Note: Gabriele Minì set the fastest lap but did not finish in the top ten, so he was ineligible to score the point for it. Arvid Lindblad scored the point for setting the fastest lap among those finishing in the top ten.)	(Republic of Ireland) Alex Dunne	(New Zealand) Rodin Motorsport	Report
5	SR	Circuit de Monaco		(France) Victor Martins (Note: Victor Martins set the fastest lap but did not finish in the top ten, so he was ineligible to score the point for it. Alex Dunne scored the point for setting the fastest lap among those finishing in the top ten.)	(India) Kush Maini	(France) DAMS Lucas Oil	Report
5	FR	Circuit de Monaco	(Republic of Ireland) Alex Dunne	(Sweden) Dino Beganovic (Note: Dino Beganovic set the fastest lap but did not finish in the top ten, so he was ineligible to score the point for it. Oliver Goethe would have scored the point for setting the fastest lap among those finishing in the top ten, but as less than 50% of the scheduled race distance was completed, he was not awarded the point for it.)	(United States) Jak Crawford	(France) DAMS Lucas Oil	Report
6	SR	(Spain) Circuit de Barcelona-Catalunya		(Republic of Ireland) Alex Dunne	(Netherlands) Richard Verschoor	(Netherlands) MP Motorsport	Report
6	FR	(Spain) Circuit de Barcelona-Catalunya	(United Kingdom) Arvid Lindblad	(Republic of Ireland) Alex Dunne	(United Kingdom) Arvid Lindblad	(Spain) Campos Racing	Report
7	SR	(Austria) Red Bull Ring		(India) Kush Maini (Note: Kush Maini set the fastest lap but did not finish in the top ten, so he was ineligible to score the point for it. Roman Staněk scored the point for setting the fastest lap among those finishing in the top ten.)	(Spain) Pepe Martí	(Spain) Campos Racing	Report
7	FR	(Austria) Red Bull Ring	(Italy) Leonardo Fornaroli	(Colombia) Sebastián Montoya	(Netherlands) Richard Verschoor	(Netherlands) MP Motorsport	Report
8	SR	(United Kingdom) Silverstone Circuit		(Colombia) Sebastián Montoya	(Italy) Leonardo Fornaroli	(United Kingdom) Invicta Racing	Report
8	FR	(United Kingdom) Silverstone Circuit	(France) Victor Martins	(United Kingdom) Arvid Lindblad	(United States) Jak Crawford	(France) DAMS Lucas Oil	Report
9	SR	(Belgium) Circuit de Spa-Francorchamps		(United Kingdom) Arvid Lindblad (Note: Arvid Lindblad set the fastest lap and originally scored the point for it, but later received a five-second time penalty for making contact with another driver at a safety car restart. This dropped him out of the top ten, making him ineligible to score the point. As a result, Leonardo Fornaroli scored the point for setting the fastest lap among those finishing in the top ten.)	(Italy) Leonardo Fornaroli	(United Kingdom) Invicta Racing	Report
9	FR	(Belgium) Circuit de Spa-Francorchamps	(Republic of Ireland) Alex Dunne	(Sweden) Dino Beganovic	(Czech Republic) Roman Staněk (Note: Alex Dunne originally won the race, but later received a ten-second time penalty for a breach in relation to the start-up procedure. Arvid Lindblad, initially classified second, would have inherited the win, but was later disqualified as the tyre pressures of his car were below the limit required. As a result, Roman Staněk, initially classified third, inherited the win.)	(United Kingdom) Invicta Racing	Report
10	SR	(Hungary) Hungaroring		(Italy) Gabriele Minì (Note: Gabriele Minì set the fastest lap but did not finish in the top ten, so he was ineligible to score the point for it. Pepe Martí scored the point for setting the fastest lap among those finishing in the top ten.)	(Spain) Pepe Martí	(Spain) Campos Racing	Report
10	FR	(Hungary) Hungaroring	(Czech Republic) Roman Staněk	(Sweden) Dino Beganovic	(Italy) Leonardo Fornaroli	(United Kingdom) Invicta Racing	Report
11	SR	(Italy) Monza Circuit		(Germany) Oliver Goethe (Note: Oliver Goethe set the fastest lap but did not finish in the top ten, so he was ineligible to score the point for it. Arvid Lindblad scored the point for setting the fastest lap among those finishing in the top ten.)	(Italy) Leonardo Fornaroli	(United Kingdom) Invicta Racing	Report
11	FR	(Italy) Monza Circuit	(United Kingdom) Luke Browning	(Germany) Oliver Goethe (Note: Oliver Goethe set the fastest lap but did not finish in the top ten, so he was ineligible to score the point for it. Dino Beganovic scored the point for setting the fastest lap among those finishing in the top ten.)	(United Kingdom) Luke Browning	(United Kingdom) Hitech TGR	Report
12	SR	(Azerbaijan) Baku City Circuit		(Sweden) Dino Beganovic	(Sweden) Dino Beganovic	(United Kingdom) Hitech TGR	Report
12	FR	(Azerbaijan) Baku City Circuit	(United States) Jak Crawford	(Paraguay) Joshua Dürksen	(United States) Jak Crawford	(France) DAMS Lucas Oil	Report
13	SR	(Qatar) Lusail International Circuit		(Netherlands) Richard Verschoor	(Netherlands) Richard Verschoor	(Netherlands) MP Motorsport	Report
13	FR	(Qatar) Lusail International Circuit	(Italy) Leonardo Fornaroli (Note: Oliver Goethe set the fastest time in qualifying, but later received a three-place grid penalty for impeding another driver. Leonardo Fornaroli was promoted to pole position in his place.)	(Sweden) Dino Beganovic	(France) Victor Martins	(France) ART Grand Prix	Report
14	SR	(United Arab Emirates) Yas Marina Circuit		(United Kingdom) Luke Browning (Note: Luke Browning set the fastest lap but did not finish in the top ten, so he was ineligible to score the point for it. Arvid Lindblad scored the point for setting the fastest lap among those finishing in the top ten.)	(United Kingdom) Arvid Lindblad	(Spain) Campos Racing	Report
14	FR	(United Arab Emirates) Yas Marina Circuit	(Czech Republic) Roman Staněk	(United States) Jak Crawford	(Paraguay) Joshua Dürksen	(United Arab Emirates) AIX Racing	Report

=== Scoring system ===
Points were awarded to the top eight classified finishers in the sprint race, and to the top ten classified finishers in the feature race. (Note: In the event of a race ending prematurely, the number of points paying positions could be reduced, depending on how much of the race has been completed.) The pole-sitter in the feature race also received two points, and one point was given to the driver who set the fastest lap in both the feature and sprint races, provided that driver finished inside the top ten. If the driver who set the fastest lap was classified outside the top ten, the point was given to the driver who set the fastest lap of those inside the top ten. No extra points were awarded to the pole-sitter in the sprint race as the grid for it was set by reversing the top ten qualifiers.

Sprint race points

Points were awarded to the top eight classified finishers, excluding the fastest lap point which was given to the top ten classified finishers.

Position	1st	2nd	3rd	4th	5th	6th	7th	8th	FL
Points	10	8	6	5	4	3	2	1	1

Feature race points

Points were awarded to the top ten classified finishers. Bonus points were awarded to the pole-sitter and to the driver who set the fastest lap and finished in the top ten.

Position	1st	2nd	3rd	4th	5th	6th	7th	8th	9th	10th	Pole	FL
Points	25	18	15	12	10	8	6	4	2	1	2	1

=== Drivers' Championship standings ===
Pos.	Driver	ALB (Australia)		BHR (Bahrain)		JED (Saudi Arabia)		IMO (Italy)		MON (Monaco)		CAT (Spain)		RBR (Austria)		SIL (United Kingdom)		SPA (Belgium)		HUN (Hungary)		MNZ (Italy)		BAK (Azerbaijan)		LUS (Qatar)		YAS (United Arab Emirates)		Points
Pos.	Driver	SR	FR (Note: The race was cancelled due to adverse weather conditions. Only points for pole position were awarded.)	SR	FR	SR	FR	SR	FR	SR	FR (Note: As more than 25% but less than 50% of the scheduled race distance was completed, reduced points were awarded on a 13–10–8–6–5–4–3–2–1 basis to the top nine finishers. Additionally, as less than 50% of the scheduled race distance was completed, no points were awarded for the fastest lap of the race.)	SR	FR	SR	FR	SR	FR	SR	FR	SR	FR	SR	FR	SR	FR	SR	FR	SR	FR	Points
1	(Italy) Leonardo Fornaroli	2	C	8	3^{P}	7	4	7	5	7	2	7	21†	16†	2^{P}	1	6	1^{F}	5	5	1	1	5	5	5	6	2^{P}	17	11	211
2	(United States) Jak Crawford	Ret	C	12	16	Ret	2^{P}	1	6	4	1	4	4	DNS	3	6	1	10	17	3	3	16	11	4	1^{P}	8	11	6	10^{F}	175
3	(Netherlands) Richard Verschoor	4	C	2	6	4^{F}	1^{F}	22†	9	5	Ret	1	3	4	1	7	7	Ret	18	6	5	4	8	6	8	1^{F}	6	11	13	170
4	(United Kingdom) Luke Browning	3	C	10	2^{F}	9	6	3^{F}	2	3	4	6	20	Ret	5	12	3	Ret	3	12	4	8	1^{P}	2	19	17	10	20	14	162
5	(Republic of Ireland) Alex Dunne	9	C	19	1	3	8	5	1	9^{F}	Ret^{P}	2^{F}	5^{F}	6	DSQ	Ret	2	7	9^{P}	2	9	13	Ret	3	Ret	5	3	8	Ret	150
6	(United Kingdom) Arvid Lindblad	10	C	5	8	1	7	2	4^{F}	8	5	8	1^{P}	Ret	12	9	8^{F}	17	DSQ	10	6	2^{F}	Ret	10	6	18	4	1^{F}	9	134
7	(Sweden) Dino Beganovic	14	C	3	7	15	13	12	3^{P}	15	Ret^{F}	15	15	Ret	9	18	4	16	7^{F}	8	7^{F}	6	6^{F}	1^{F}	3	9	9^{F}	4	4	116
8	(Spain) Pepe Martí	8	C	1	4	2	5	16	14	Ret	Ret	14	6	1	6	10	9	5	4	1^{F}	10	9	3	Ret	11					112
9	(Paraguay) Joshua Dürksen	1	C	DSQ	10	12	11	11	13	Ret	Ret	NC	17	2	13	5	20†	11	11	11	12	3	2	9	2^{F}	2	14	2	1	107
10	(Czech Republic) Roman Staněk	5	C	15	17	5	12	8	17	11	7	17	11	3^{F}	8	3	Ret	6	1	13	2^{P}	5	Ret	11	13	13	8	10	2^{P}	105
11	(France) Victor Martins	Ret	C^{P}	14	5	8	3	4	12	17	Ret	5	8	7	7	8	19†^{P}	2	8	4	Ret	19	Ret	8	15	11	1	7	Ret	97
12	(Colombia) Sebastián Montoya	6	C	Ret	19	13	Ret	9	8	6	3	11	2	5	4^{F}	2^{F}	5	15	21†	Ret	15	10	9	15	9	4	5	12	Ret	91
13	(Italy) Gabriele Minì	7^{F}	C	7	9	6	9	15	18	2	Ret	Ret	10	14†	Ret	14	Ret	3	6	14	17	7	7	7	4	12	13	9	3	72
14	(Mexico) Rafael Villagómez	13	C	6	12	17	17	14	Ret	18	9	3	Ret	9	11	16	10	12	14	18	13	12	4	Ret	7	3	12	15	6	43
15	(Germany) Oliver Goethe	11	C	4^{F}	11	11	14	10	7	12	10	18	16	11	17†	11	11	4	13	7	8	18	16	Ret	12	14	Ret	5	5	37
16	(India) Kush Maini	16	C	16	18	10	10	13	21	1	6	16	7	17	16	4	16	NC	20	9	11	Ret	12	Ret	20†	Ret	16	16	7	32
17	(Japan) Ritomo Miyata	12	C	9	14	19	16	6	16	10	Ret	13	9	8	Ret	20	15	8	2	15	18	11	14	12	10	16	Ret	13	8	30
18	(Bulgaria) Nikola Tsolov																									10	7	3	12	12
19	(Belgium) Amaury Cordeel	15	C	11	13	14	15	20	15	14	8	10	13	13†	Ret	19	17	Ret	10	16	Ret	17	13	16	16					3
20	(Norway) Martinius Stenshorne																							Ret	Ret	7	15	21†	15	2
21	(France) Sami Meguetounif	Ret	C	13	15	16	Ret	21	10	16	12	9	12	Ret	10	13	18	18†	15	17	14	Ret	Ret							2
22	(United Kingdom) John Bennett	18	C	17	20	20	20	19	20	Ret	11	Ret	18	15†	14	15	12	9	12	20	Ret	14	10	13	14	15	17	Ret	16	1
23	(United States) Max Esterson	Ret	C	Ret	21	18	18	17	19	13	Ret	19	14	10	15	21	13	14	16	19	19	Ret	15							0
24	(United Kingdom) Cian Shields	17	C	18	22	Ret	19	18	11	Ret	13	12	19	12	Ret	17	14	13	19	21	16	15	Ret	14	18	Ret	20	19	Ret	0
25	(Netherlands) Laurens van Hoepen																							17	17	19	18	14	DNS	0
26	(Thailand) Tasanapol Inthraphuvasak																											18	17	0
27	(Australia) James Wharton																									Ret	19			0
Pos.	Driver	SR	FR	SR	FR	SR	FR	SR	FR	SR	FR	SR	FR	SR	FR	SR	FR	SR	FR	SR	FR	SR	FR	SR	FR	SR	FR	SR	FR	Points
Pos.	Driver	ALB (Australia)		BHR (Bahrain)		JED (Saudi Arabia)		IMO (Italy)		MON (Monaco)		CAT (Spain)		RBR (Austria)		SIL (United Kingdom)		SPA (Belgium)		HUN (Hungary)		MNZ (Italy)		BAK (Azerbaijan)		LUS (Qatar)		YAS (United Arab Emirates)		Points

Key
Colour	Result
Gold	Winner
Silver	Second place
Bronze	Third place
Green	Other points position
Blue	Other classified position
Blue	Not classified, finished (NC)
Purple	Not classified, retired (Ret)
Red	Did not qualify (DNQ)
Black	Disqualified (DSQ)
White	Did not start (DNS)
White	Race cancelled (C)
Blank	Did not practice (DNP)
Blank	Excluded (EX)
Blank	Did not arrive (DNA)
Blank	Withdrawn (WD)
Blank	Did not enter (empty cell)
Annotation	Meaning
P	Pole position
F	Fastest lap

† – Driver did not finish the race, but was classified as he completed more than 90% of the race distance.

=== Teams' Championship standings ===
Pos.	Team	ALB (Australia)		BHR (Bahrain)		JED (Saudi Arabia)		IMO (Italy)		MON (Monaco)		CAT (Spain)		RBR (Austria)		SIL (United Kingdom)		SPA (Belgium)		HUN (Hungary)		MNZ (Italy)		BAK (Azerbaijan)		LUS (Qatar)		YAS (United Arab Emirates)		Points
Pos.	Team	SR	FR	SR	FR	SR	FR	SR	FR	SR	FR	SR	FR	SR	FR	SR	FR	SR	FR	SR	FR	SR	FR	SR	FR	SR	FR	SR	FR	Points
1	(United Kingdom) Invicta Racing	2	C	8	3^{P}	5	4	7	5	7	2	7	11	3^{F}	2^{P}	1	6	1^{F}	1	5	1	1	5	5	5	6	2^{P}	10	2^{P}	316
1	(United Kingdom) Invicta Racing	5	C	15	17	7	12	8	17	11	7	17	21†	16†	8	3	Ret	6	5	13	2^{P}	5	Ret	11	13	13	8	17	11	316
2	(United Kingdom) Hitech TGR	3	C	3	2^{F}	9	6	3^{F}	2	3	4	6	15	Ret	5	12	3	16	3	8	4	6	1^{P}	1^{F}	3	9	9^{F}	4	4	278
2	(United Kingdom) Hitech TGR	14	C	10	7	15	13	12	3^{P}	15	Ret^{F}	15	20	Ret	9	18	4	Ret	7^{F}	12	7^{F}	8	6^{F}	2	19	17	10	20	14	278
3	(Spain) Campos Racing	8	C	1	4	1	5	2	4^{F}	8	5	8	1^{P}	1	6	9	8^{F}	5	4	1^{F}	6	2^{F}	3	10	6	10	4	1^{F}	9	258
3	(Spain) Campos Racing	10	C	5	8	2	7	16	14	Ret	Ret	14	6	Ret	12	10	9	17	DSQ	10	10	9	Ret	Ret	11	18	7	3	12	258
4	(France) DAMS Lucas Oil	16	C	12	16	10	2^{P}	1	6	1	1	4	4	17	3	4	1	10	17	3	3	16	11	4	1^{P}	8	11	6	7	207
4	(France) DAMS Lucas Oil	Ret	C	16	18	Ret	10	13	21	4	6	16	7	DNS	16	6	16	NC	20	9	11	Ret	12	Ret	20†	Ret	16	16	10^{F}	207
5	(Netherlands) MP Motorsport	4	C	2	6	4^{F}	1^{F}	10	7	5	10	1	3	4	1	7	7	4	13	6	5	4	8	6	8	1^{F}	6	5	5	207
5	(Netherlands) MP Motorsport	11	C	4^{F}	11	11	14	22†	9	12	Ret	18	16	11	17†	11	11	Ret	18	7	8	18	16	Ret	12	14	Ret	11	13	207
6	(Italy) Prema Racing	6	C	7	9	6	9	9	8	2	3	11	2	5	4^{F}	2^{F}	5	3	6	14	15	7	7	7	4	4	5	9	3	163
6	(Italy) Prema Racing	7^{F}	C	Ret	19	13	Ret	15	18	6	Ret	Ret	10	14†	Ret	14	Ret	15	21†	Ret	17	10	9	15	9	12	13	12	Ret	163
7	(New Zealand) Rodin Motorsport	9	C	11	1	3	8	5	1	9^{F}	8	2^{F}	5^{F}	6	Ret	19	2	7	9^{P}	2	9	13	13	3	16	5	3	8	15	155
7	(New Zealand) Rodin Motorsport	15	C	19	13	14	15	20	15	14	Ret^{P}	10	13	13†	DSQ	Ret	17	Ret	10	16	Ret	17	Ret	16	Ret	7	15	21†	Ret	155
8	(France) ART Grand Prix	12	C^{P}	9	5	8	3	4	12	10	Ret	5	8	7	7	8	15	2	2	4	18	11	14	8	10	11	1	7	8	127
8	(France) ART Grand Prix	Ret	C	14	14	19	16	6	16	17	Ret	13	9	8	Ret	20	19†^{P}	8	8	15	Ret	19	Ret	12	15	16	Ret	13	Ret	127
9	(United Arab Emirates) AIX Racing	1	C	18	10	12	11	11	11	Ret	13	12	17	2	13	5	14	11	11	11	12	3	2	9	2^{F}	2	14	2	1	107
9	(United Arab Emirates) AIX Racing	17	C	DSQ	22	Ret	19	18	13	Ret	Ret	NC	19	12	Ret	17	20†	13	19	21	16	15	Ret	14	18	Ret	20	19	Ret	107
10	(Netherlands) Van Amersfoort Racing	13	C	6	12	17	17	14	20	18	9	3	18	9	11	15	10	9	12	18	13	12	4	13	7	3	12	15	6	44
10	(Netherlands) Van Amersfoort Racing	18	C	17	20	20	20	19	Ret	Ret	11	Ret	Ret	15†	14	16	12	12	14	20	Ret	14	10	Ret	14	15	17	Ret	16	44
11	(Italy) Trident	Ret	C	13	15	16	18	17	10	13	12	9	12	10	10	13	13	14	15	17	14	Ret	15	17	17	19	18	14	17	2
11	(Italy) Trident	Ret	C	Ret	21	18	Ret	21	19	16	Ret	19	14	Ret	15	21	18	18†	16	19	19	Ret	Ret	Ret	Ret	Ret	19	18	DNS	2
Pos.	Team	SR	FR	SR	FR	SR	FR	SR	FR	SR	FR	SR	FR	SR	FR	SR	FR	SR	FR	SR	FR	SR	FR	SR	FR	SR	FR	SR	FR	Points
Pos.	Team	ALB (Australia)		BHR (Bahrain)		JED (Saudi Arabia)		IMO (Italy)		MON (Monaco)		CAT (Spain)		RBR (Austria)		SIL (United Kingdom)		SPA (Belgium)		HUN (Hungary)		MNZ (Italy)		BAK (Azerbaijan)		LUS (Qatar)		YAS (United Arab Emirates)		Points

Key
Colour	Result
Gold	Winner
Silver	Second place
Bronze	Third place
Green	Other points position
Blue	Other classified position
Blue	Not classified, finished (NC)
Purple	Not classified, retired (Ret)
Red	Did not qualify (DNQ)
Black	Disqualified (DSQ)
White	Did not start (DNS)
White	Race cancelled (C)
Blank	Did not practice (DNP)
Blank	Excluded (EX)
Blank	Did not arrive (DNA)
Blank	Withdrawn (WD)
Blank	Did not enter (empty cell)
Annotation	Meaning
P	Pole position
F	Fastest lap

† – Driver did not finish the race, but was classified as he completed more than 90% of the race distance.

Rows are not related to the drivers: within each team, individual race standings are sorted purely based on the final classification in the race (not by total points scored in the event, which includes points awarded for fastest lap and pole position).
