= 2025 Imola Formula 2 round =

Motor racing event

(Italy) 2025 Imola Formula 2 round
Round details
- Round 4 of 14 in the 2025 FIA Formula 2 Championship.
- Layout of the Autodromo Internazionale Enzo e Dino Ferrari
- Location: Autodromo Internazionale Enzo e Dino Ferrari; Imola, Emilia-Romagna, Italy
- Course: Permanent racing facility 4.909 km (3.050 mi)

Sprint Race
- Date: 17 May 2025
- Laps: 25
Podium
First	(United States) Jak Crawford	DAMS Lucas Oil
Second	(United Kingdom) Arvid Lindblad	Campos Racing
Third	(United Kingdom) Luke Browning	Hitech TGR
Fastest lap
Driver	(United Kingdom) Luke Browning	Hitech TGR
- Time: 1:30.244 (on lap 7)

Feature Race
- Date: 18 May 2025
- Laps: 35
Pole position
Driver	(Sweden) Dino Beganovic	Hitech TGR
Time	1:27.418	
Podium
First	(Republic of Ireland) Alex Dunne	Rodin Motorsport
Second	(United Kingdom) Luke Browning	Hitech TGR
Third	(Sweden) Dino Beganovic	Hitech TGR
Fastest lap
Driver	(Italy) Gabriele Minì	Prema Racing
- Time: 1:29.084 (on lap 32)

The 2025 Imola FIA Formula 2 round was a motor racing event held between 16 and 18 May 2025 at the Autodromo Internazionale Enzo e Dino Ferrari in Imola, Emilia-Romagna, Italy. It was the fourth round of the 2025 FIA Formula 2 Championship and was held in support of the 2025 Emilia Romagna Grand Prix.

Dino Beganovic took his maiden F2 pole position in qualifying. In the sprint race, Jak Crawford won from the front row of the grid ahead of Arvid Lindblad and Luke Browning, with championship leader Richard Verschoor retiring from the race. Alex Dunne won the feature race ahead of Browning and Beganovic, with Sebastián Montoya and Victor Martins both stalling on the grid. Dunne left the weekend as the championship leader, six points ahead of Browning.

== Classification ==
=== Qualifying ===
Pos.	No.	Driver	Entrant	Time/Gap	Grid SR	Grid FR
1	8	(Sweden) Dino Beganovic	Hitech TGR	1:27.418	10	1
2	9	(Colombia) Sebastián Montoya	Prema Racing	+0.003	9	2
3	14	(France) Victor Martins	ART Grand Prix	+0.006	8	3
4	1	(Italy) Leonardo Fornaroli	Invicta Racing	+0.284	7	4
5	17	(Republic of Ireland) Alex Dunne	Rodin Motorsport	+0.388	6	5
6	4	(United Kingdom) Arvid Lindblad	Campos Racing	+0.397	5	6
7	7	(United Kingdom) Luke Browning	Hitech TGR	+0.409	4	7
8	5	(Germany) Oliver Goethe	MP Motorsport	+0.532	3	8
9	11	(United States) Jak Crawford	DAMS Lucas Oil	+0.625	2	9
10	15	(Japan) Ritomo Miyata	ART Grand Prix	+0.690	1	10
11	3	(Spain) Pepe Martí	Campos Racing	+0.802	11	11
12	2	(Czech Republic) Roman Staněk	Invicta Racing	+0.819	12	12
13	12	(India) Kush Maini	DAMS Lucas Oil	+0.827^{1}	13	13
14	20	(Paraguay) Joshua Dürksen	AIX Racing	+0.842	14	14
15	10	(Italy) Gabriele Minì	Prema Racing	+0.886	15	15
16	22	(France) Sami Meguetounif	Trident	+1.125	16	16
17	25	(Mexico) Rafael Villagómez	Van Amersfoort Racing	+1.200	17	17
18	23	(United States) Max Esterson	Trident	+1.254	18	18
19	6	(Netherlands) Richard Verschoor	MP Motorsport	+1.262	19	19
20	16	(Belgium) Amaury Cordeel	Rodin Motorsport	+1.412	20	20
21	24	(United Kingdom) John Bennett	Van Amersfoort Racing	+1.458	21	21
22	21	(United Kingdom) Cian Shields	AIX Racing	+2.116	22	22

Notes:

- Kush Maini had his fastest lap time deleted for causing a red flag, demoting him from 9th to 13th.

=== Sprint race ===
Pos.	No.	Driver	Entrant	Laps	Time/Retired	Grid	Points
1	11	(United States) Jak Crawford	DAMS Lucas Oil	25	38:06.814	2	10
2	4	(United Kingdom) Arvid Lindblad	Campos Racing	25	+1.101	5	8
3	7	(United Kingdom) Luke Browning	Hitech TGR	25	+7.594	4	6 (1)
4	14	(France) Victor Martins	ART Grand Prix	25	+8.700	8	5
5	17	(Republic of Ireland) Alex Dunne	Rodin Motorsport	25	+8.936	6	4
6	15	(Japan) Ritomo Miyata	ART Grand Prix	25	+16.353	1	3
7	1	(Italy) Leonardo Fornaroli	Invicta Racing	25	+16.980	7	2
8	2	(Czech Republic) Roman Staněk	Invicta Racing	25	+17.349	12	1
9	9	(Colombia) Sebastián Montoya	Prema Racing	25	+24.195	9	
10	5	(Germany) Oliver Goethe	MP Motorsport	25	+26.506	3	
11	20	(Paraguay) Joshua Dürksen	AIX Racing	25	+27.354	14	
12	8	(Sweden) Dino Beganovic	Hitech TGR	25	+27.517	10	
13	12	(India) Kush Maini	DAMS Lucas Oil	25	+28.043	13	
14	25	(Mexico) Rafael Villagómez	Van Amersfoort Racing	25	+28.930	17	
15	10	(Italy) Gabriele Minì	Prema Racing	25	+29.240	15	
16	3	(Spain) Pepe Martí	Campos Racing	25	+33.214^{1}	11	
17	23	(United States) Max Esterson	Trident	25	+35.832	18	
18	21	(United Kingdom) Cian Shields	AIX Racing	25	+46.459	22	
19	24	(United Kingdom) John Bennett	Van Amersfoort Racing	25	+46.766	21	
20	16	(Belgium) Amaury Cordeel	Rodin Motorsport	25	+53.219	20	
21	22	(France) Sami Meguetounif	Trident	25	+1:15.704	16	
22	6	(Netherlands) Richard Verschoor	MP Motorsport	22	DNF	19	
Fastest lap set by (United Kingdom) Luke Browning: 1:30.244 (lap 7)

Notes:

- ^1 Pepe Martí was given a 5-second penalty for causing a collision with Gabriele Minì, demoting him from 14th to 16th.

=== Feature race ===
Pos.	No.	Driver	Entrant	Laps	Time/Retired	Grid	Points
1	17	(Republic of Ireland) Alex Dunne	Rodin Motorsport	35	55:50.708	5	25
2	7	(United Kingdom) Luke Browning	Hitech TGR	35	+6.592	7	18
3	8	(Sweden) Dino Beganovic	Hitech TGR	35	+7.599	1	15 (2)
4	4	(United Kingdom) Arvid Lindblad	Campos Racing	35	+8.808	6	12 (1)
5	1	(Italy) Leonardo Fornaroli	Invicta Racing	35	+12.125	4	10
6	11	(United States) Jak Crawford	DAMS Lucas Oil	35	+13.178	9	8
7	5	(Germany) Oliver Goethe	MP Motorsport	35	+14.481	8	6
8	9	(Colombia) Sebastián Montoya	Prema Racing	35	+15.499	2	4
9	6	(Netherlands) Richard Verschoor	MP Motorsport	35	+16.197	19	2
10	22	(France) Sami Meguetounif	Trident	35	+26.193	16	1
11	21	(United Kingdom) Cian Shields	AIX Racing	35	+33.959^{1}	22	
12	14	(France) Victor Martins	ART Grand Prix	35	+37.167	3	
13	20	(Paraguay) Joshua Dürksen	AIX Racing	35	+43.179	14	
14	3	(Spain) Pepe Martí	Campos Racing	35	+43.955	11	
15	16	(Belgium) Amaury Cordeel	Rodin Motorsport	35	+47.345	20	
16	15	(Japan) Ritomo Miyata	ART Grand Prix	35	+49.311	10	
17	2	(Czech Republic) Roman Staněk	Invicta Racing	35	+53.347	12	
18	10	(Italy) Gabriele Minì	Prema Racing	35	+55.656	15	
19	23	(United States) Max Esterson	Trident	35	+59.555	18	
20	24	(United Kingdom) John Bennett	Van Amersfoort Racing	35	+1:04.312	22	
21	12	(India) Kush Maini	DAMS Lucas Oil	35	+1:24.943	13	
DNF	25	(Mexico) Rafael Villagómez	Van Amersfoort Racing	13	Collision damage	17	
Fastest lap set by (Italy) Gabriele Minì: 1:29.084 (lap 32)^{2}

Notes

- ^1 Cian Shields was given a 5-second penalty for speeding in the pit lane. The penalty did not affect his finishing position.
- ^2 Gabriele Minì set the fastest lap but did not finish in the top ten, so he was ineligible to score the point for it. Arvid Lindblad scored the point for setting the fastest lap among those finishing in the top ten.

== Standings after the event ==
Drivers' Championship standings

	Pos.	Driver	Points
3	1	(Republic of Ireland) Alex Dunne	64
3	2	(United Kingdom) Luke Browning	58
2	3	(Netherlands) Richard Verschoor	55
1	4	(Italy) Leonardo Fornaroli	52
2	5	(United Kingdom) Arvid Lindblad	45

Teams' Championship standings

	Pos.	Team	Points
3	1	(United Kingdom) Hitech TGR	87
1	2	(Spain) Campos Racing	86
1	3	(Netherlands) MP Motorsport	67
1	4	(New Zealand) Rodin Motorsport	64
2	3	(United Kingdom) Invicta Racing	61

Note: Only the top five positions are included for both sets of standings.

== See also ==
- 2025 Emilia Romagna Grand Prix
- 2025 Imola Formula 3 round

Previous round: 2025 Jeddah Formula 2 round	FIA Formula 2 Championship; 2025 season	Next round: 2025 Monte Carlo Formula 2 round
Previous round: 2024 Imola Formula 2 round	Imola Formula 2 round	Next round: None
