= 2025 Sakhir Formula 2 round =

Motor racing event

(Bahrain) 2025 Sakhir Formula 2 round
Round details
- Round 2 of 14 in the 2025 FIA Formula 2 Championship.
- Location: Bahrain International Circuit; Sakhir, Bahrain
- Course: Permanent racing facility 5.412 km (3.363 mi)

Sprint Race
- Date: 12 April 2025
- Laps: 23
Podium
First	(Spain) Pepe Martí	Campos Racing
Second	(Netherlands) Richard Verschoor	MP Motorsport
Third	(Sweden) Dino Beganovic	Hitech TGR
Fastest lap
Driver	(India) Kush Maini	DAMS
- Time: 1:48.090 (on lap 21)

Feature Race
- Date: 13 April 2025
- Laps: 32
Pole position
Driver	(Italy) Leonardo Fornaroli	Invicta Racing
Time	1:44.008	
Podium
First	(Republic of Ireland) Alexander Dunne	Rodin Motorsport
Second	(United Kingdom) Luke Browning	Hitech TGR
Third	(Italy) Leonardo Fornaroli	Invicta Racing
Fastest lap
Driver	(United Kingdom) Luke Browning	Hitech TGR
- Time: 1:49.987 (on lap 15)

The 2025 Sakhir FIA Formula 2 round was a motor racing event held between 11 and 13 April 2025 at the Bahrain International Circuit. It was the second round of the 2025 FIA Formula 2 Championship and was held in support of the 2025 Bahrain Grand Prix.

== Report ==
=== Qualifying ===
Leonardo Fornaroli claimed pole position for the weekend, ahead of Victor Martins in second and Luke Browning in third. Joshua Dürksen started on reverse-grid pole for the sprint race.

=== Sprint race ===
After starting in eleventh place, Pepe Martí won the sprint race ahead of Richard Verschoor and Joshua Dürksen, who finished in second and third, respectively. However, due to Dürksen's disqualification from the race, Dino Beganovic moved up into third.

=== Feature race ===
The feature race was won by Alex Dunne, who started fourth. He finished ahead of Luke Browning and Leonardo Fornaroli in second and third respectively.

== Classification ==
=== Qualifying ===
Pos.	No.	Driver	Entrant	Time/Gap	Grid SR	Grid FR
1	1	(Italy) Leonardo Fornaroli	Invicta Racing	1:44.008	10	1
2	14	(France) Victor Martins	ART Grand Prix	+0.155	9	2
3	7	(United Kingdom) Luke Browning	Hitech TGR	+0.284	8	3
4	17	(Republic of Ireland) Alexander Dunne	Rodin Motorsport	+0.316	7	4
5	2	(Czech Republic) Roman Staněk	Invicta Racing	+0.547	6	5
6	6	(Netherlands) Richard Verschoor	MP Motorsport	+0.603	5	6
7	22	(France) Sami Meguetounif	Trident	+0.701	4	7
8	25	(Mexico) Rafael Villagómez	Van Amersfoort Racing	+0.738	3	8
9	8	(Sweden) Dino Beganovic	Hitech TGR	+0.757	2	9
10	20	(Paraguay) Joshua Dürksen	AIX Racing	+0.794	1	10
11	3	(Spain) Pepe Martí	Campos Racing	+0.823	11	11
12	10	(Italy) Gabriele Minì	Prema Racing	+0.831	12	12
13	24	(United Kingdom) John Bennett	Van Amersfoort Racing	+0.858	13	13
14	11	(United States) Jak Crawford	DAMS	+0.929	14	14
15	5	(Germany) Oliver Goethe	MP Motorsport	+0.955	15	15
16	4	(United Kingdom) Arvid Lindblad	Campos Racing	+0.967	16	16
17	23	(United States) Max Esterson	Trident	+0.978	17	17
18	9	(Colombia) Sebastián Montoya	Prema Racing	+1.043	18	18
19	15	(Japan) Ritomo Miyata	ART Grand Prix	+1.144	19	19
20	12	(India) Kush Maini	DAMS	+1.255	20	20
21	16	(Belgium) Amaury Cordeel	Rodin Motorsport	+1.952	21	21
22	21	(United Kingdom) Cian Shields	AIX Racing	+2.048	22	22

=== Sprint race ===
Pos.	No.	Driver	Entrant	Laps	Time/Retired	Grid	Points
1	3	(Spain) Pepe Martí	Campos Racing	23	46:24.663	11	10
2	6	(Netherlands) Richard Verschoor	MP Motorsport	23	+0.922	5	8
3	8	(Sweden) Dino Beganovic	Hitech TGR	23	+1.870	2	6
4	5	(Germany) Oliver Goethe	MP Motorsport	23	+1.984	15	5 (1)
5	4	(United Kingdom) Arvid Lindblad	Campos Racing	23	+3.028	16	4
6	25	(Mexico) Rafael Villagómez	Van Amersfoort Racing	23	+3.134	3	3
7	10	(Italy) Gabriele Minì	Prema Racing	23	+3.321	12	2
8	1	(Italy) Leonardo Fornaroli	Invicta Racing	23	+3.972	10	1
9	15	(Japan) Ritomo Miyata	ART Grand Prix	23	+4.205	19	
10	7	(United Kingdom) Luke Browning	Hitech TGR	23	+4.498	8	
11	16	(Belgium) Amaury Cordeel	Rodin Motorsport	23	+4.657	21	
12	11	(United States) Jak Crawford	DAMS Lucas Oil	23	+7.131	14	
13	22	(France) Sami Meguetounif	Trident	23	+7.956	4	
14	14	(France) Victor Martins	ART Grand Prix	23	+9.176	9	
15	2	(Czech Republic) Roman Staněk	Invicta Racing	23	+9.330	6	
16	12	(India) Kush Maini	DAMS Lucas Oil	23	+9.439	20	
17	24	(United Kingdom) John Bennett	Van Amersfoort Racing	23	+10.633	13	
18	21	(United Kingdom) Cian Shields	AIX Racing	23	+12.442	22	
19	17	(Republic of Ireland) Alexander Dunne	Rodin Motorsport	13	+12.270^{1}	7	
DNF	23	(United States) Max Esterson	Trident	14	Engine	17	
DNF	9	(Colombia) Sebastián Montoya	Prema Racing	0	Spun off	18	
DSQ^{2}	20	(Paraguay) Joshua Dürksen	AIX Racing	23	Disqualified^{2}	1	
Fastest lap set by (India) Kush Maini: 1:48.090 (lap 21)

Notes:

- ^1 – Alexander Dunne originally finished 18th on the road, but was demoted to 19th place after he received two separate five-second penalties: one for a safety car infringement, and another for causing a collision with Ritomo Miyata.
- ^2 – Joshua Dürksen finished third, but was disqualified after his car's diffuser was found to be lower than the minimum height.

=== Feature race ===
Pos.	No.	Driver	Entrant	Laps	Time/Retired	Grid	Points
1	17	(Republic of Ireland) Alexander Dunne	Rodin Motorsport	32	59:40.123	4	25
2	7	(United Kingdom) Luke Browning	Hitech TGR	32	+8.244	3	18 (1)
3	1	(Italy) Leonardo Fornaroli	Invicta Racing	32	+19.433	1	15 (2)
4	3	(Spain) Pepe Martí	Campos Racing	32	+19.867	11	12
5	14	(France) Victor Martins	ART Grand Prix	32	+23.119	2	10
6	6	(Netherlands) Richard Verschoor	MP Motorsport	32	+23.573	6	8
7	8	(Sweden) Dino Beganovic	Hitech TGR	32	+24.137	9	6
8	4	(United Kingdom) Arvid Lindblad	Campos Racing	32	+26.725	16	4
9	10	(Italy) Gabriele Minì	Prema Racing	32	+34.945	12	2
10	20	(Paraguay) Joshua Dürksen	AIX Racing	32	+37.860	10	1
11	5	(Germany) Oliver Goethe	MP Motorsport	32	+41.095	15	
12	25	(Mexico) Rafael Villagómez	Van Amersfoort Racing	32	+43.201	8	
13	16	(Belgium) Amaury Cordeel	Rodin Motorsport	32	+44.469	21	
14	15	(Japan) Ritomo Miyata	ART Grand Prix	32	+46.571	19	
15	22	(France) Sami Meguetounif	Trident	32	+47.403	7	
16	11	(United States) Jak Crawford	DAMS Lucas Oil	32	+47.705	14	
17	2	(Czech Republic) Roman Staněk	Invicta Racing	32	+48.633	5	
18	12	(India) Kush Maini	DAMS Lucas Oil	32	+52.956	20	
19	9	(Colombia) Sebastián Montoya	Prema Racing	32	+55.667^{1}	19	
20	24	(United Kingdom) John Bennett	Van Amersfoort Racing	32	+55.911	13	
21	23	(United States) Max Esterson	Trident	32	+58.288	17	
22	21	(United Kingdom) Cian Shields	AIX Racing	32	+69.975	22	
Fastest lap set by (United Kingdom) Luke Browning: 1:48.726 (lap 15)

Notes:

- ^1 – Sebastián Montoya was given a five-second time penalty for speeding in the pit lane.

== Standings after the event ==
Drivers' Championship standings

	Pos.	Driver	Points
1	1	(Italy) Leonardo Fornaroli	26
7	2	(Republic of Ireland) Alex Dunne	25
	3	(United Kingdom) Luke Browning	25
4	4	(Spain) Pepe Martí	23
1	5	(Netherlands) Richard Verschoor	21

Teams' Championship standings

	Pos.	Team	Points
2	1	(United Kingdom) Hitech TGR	37
4	2	(Spain) Campos Racing	31
2	3	(United Kingdom) Invicta Racing	30
1	4	(Netherlands) MP Motorsport	27
2	5	(New Zealand) Rodin Motorsport	25

- Note: Only the top five positions are included for both sets of standings.

== See also ==
- 2025 Bahrain Grand Prix
- 2025 Sakhir Formula 3 round

Previous round: 2025 Melbourne Formula 2 round	FIA Formula 2 Championship; 2025 season	Next round: 2025 Jeddah Formula 2 round
Previous round: 2024 Sakhir Formula 2 round	Sakhir Formula 2 round	Next round: TBA
