= Hiyu Yamakoshi =

Japanese racing driver (born 2006)

- 山越 陽悠
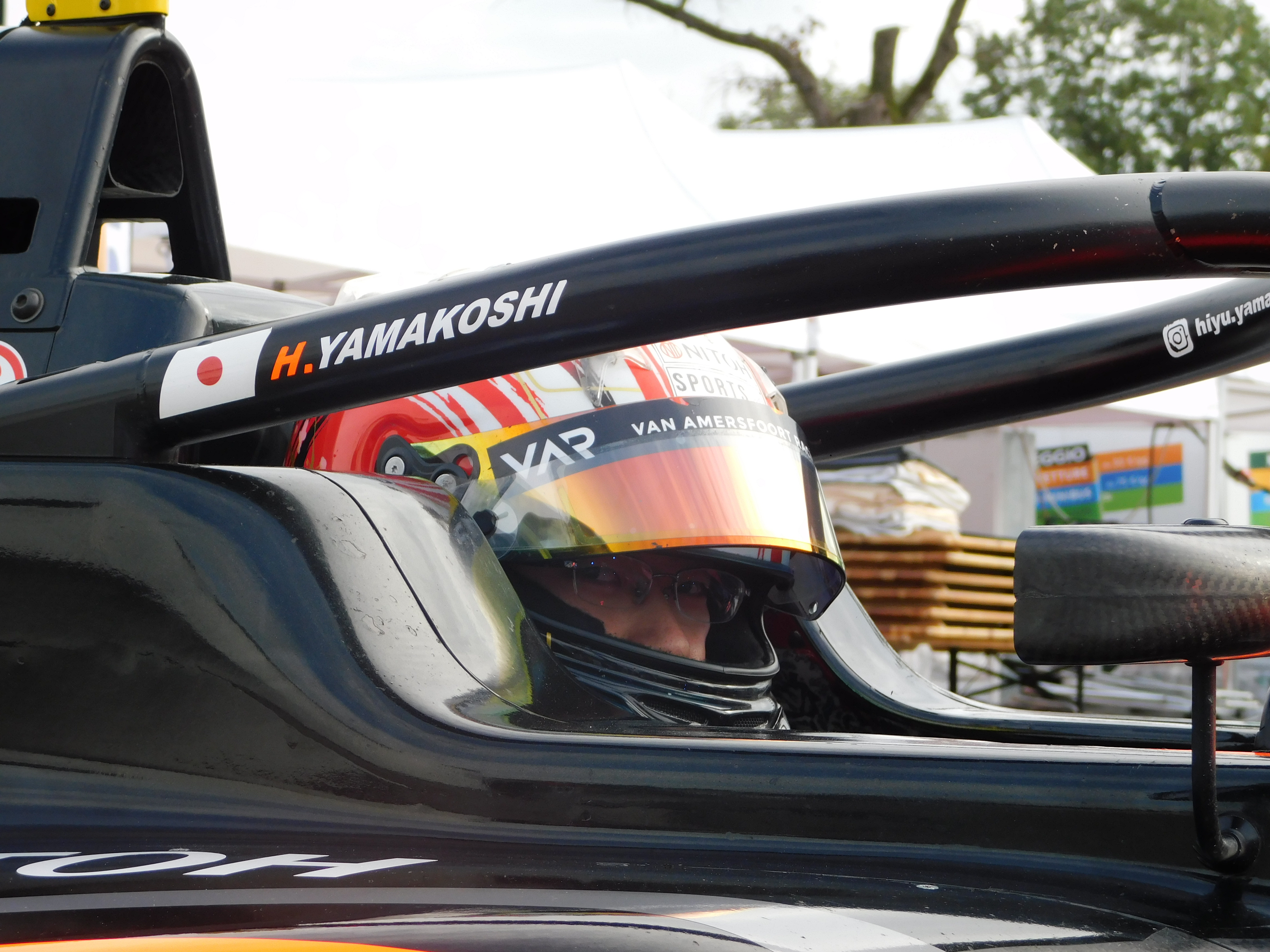
- Yamakoshi in 2024
- Born: 13 October 2006 (age 20); Itabashi, Tokyo, Japan
- Nationality: (Japan) Japanese

FIA Formula 2 Championship career
- Debut season: 2026
- Current team: Van Amersfoort Racing
- Car number: 22
- Starts: 2
- Wins: 0
- Podiums: 0
- Poles: 0
- Fastest laps: 0
- Best finish: TBD in 2026

Previous series
- 2026; 2025; 2025; 2025; 2025; 2024; 2024; 2023–2024; 2023; 2023–2024: FIA Formula 3; GB3; FR Europe; Super Formula Lights; FR Middle East; Euro 4; Italian F4; F4 Spanish; French F4; F4 UAE
- Statistics up to date as of 25 September 2026.

Hiyu Yamakoshi (Japanese: 山越 陽悠, Hepburn: Yamakoshi Hiyū; born 13 October 2006) is a Japanese racing driver who competes in the FIA Formula 2 Championship for Van Amersfoort Racing.

Yamakoshi previously competed in the 2024 Italian F4 Championship with Van Amersfoort Racing, finishing third. He progressed to the Formula Regional European Championship in 2025 and later to FIA Formula 3 in 2026 with the team, finishing ninth in both seasons.

== Career ==
=== Karting ===
Yamakoshi entered in two notable karting championships, the 2020 IAME Japan Series in the X30 Junior class where he finished in third, and the 2022 CIK-FIA European Championship in the OK category for IPK Official Racing Team, where he finished in 30th.

=== Formula 4 (2023–2024) ===
==== 2023 ====
Yamakoshi made his single-seater debut in the 2023 Formula 4 UAE Championship for Pinnacle VAR, he drove in two of the five rounds in the championship at the Kuwait Motor Town, under the Filipino license. After a pointless first round, Yamakoshi acclimated eight points in his second round, and finished 22nd in the championship.

Yamakoshi would compete in the 2023 French F4 Championship for his full-time campaign, where he scored a chain of points in his first two rounds, including a maiden podium at last race of the second round at Magny-Cours and another podium at the first race of the third round at Pau, the next race was a retirement and the final race of the round was points scoring with a maiden fastest lap. The fourth round at the Spa-Francorchamps was also consistent points-wise. Yamakoshi got second fastest lap of his campaign in the second race, and then in the third race he achieved the best result of his campaign so far, a second place. The fifth round at Misano was forgettable, as he failed to enter the top ten in all three races, with a 17th place, 12th place and a retirement in the final race. The penultimate round of the championship at Lédenon started poorly with a retirement in the first race, but Yamakoshi would claim another podium in a second race, and would end the round with a fourth place. In the championship finale at Le Castellet, he retired from the first two races but ended his maiden Formula 4 full-time season with a third place finish. Yamakoshi finished the championship in fifth place overall with 146 points.

Alongside his French F4 Championship campaign, Yamakoshi would add a second Formula 4 campaign to his schedule, driving for Tecnicar - Fórmula de Campeones in the 2023 F4 Spanish Championship. Yamakoshi scored points in his debut round at the Aragón, with a ninth place in his first race. His second round at Navarro saw him retire from two races and come 14th in the only race of the round he finished.

The rest of Yamakoshi's partial campaign saw him score various points finishes in inferior machinery, as he finished the season in 14th with 19 points.

==== 2024 ====
Yamakoshi planned to drive in the final two rounds of the 2024 Formula 4 UAE Championship for Pinnacle Motorsport, but pulled out of the final round due to an injury. He finished the championship in 32nd position.

Yamakoshi's main campaign lied in the Italian F4 Championship with Van Amersfoort Racing, where he scored points in all three races in his debut at Misano, with a sixth place and two fourth places. At Imola Circuit, Yamakoshi claimed pole positions in all three races, he got his first race win in the series at race one, after original race winner Freddie Slater was disqualified due to a technical infringement. Yamakoshi would also win the second race, but came 27th in the third race. Imola would be the highest point in the series for him, as Slater would dominate the championship, leaving Yamakoshi to settle for podiums instead of fighting for wins. At the third round in Vallelunga Circuit, he came third in all three races, and enjoyed consistent success throughout his campaign, but would become less consistent in the latter half of the season, and scored no points at the final round at Monza, getting narrowly beaten by teammate Jack Beeton for series runner-up by two points. Yamakoshi finished the championship in 3rd place with two wins, three pole positions, three fastest laps, seven podiums and 220 points.

Yamakoshi also contested the 2024 Euro 4 Championship with Van Amersfoort Racing, where in the first race at Misano, he got a second place and then a win in the second race. He also picked up a second win in the second round at the Red Bull Ring, and would finish the championship in fourth overall, with 89 points.

Yamakoshi partnered up with Monlau Motorsport for the fourth round of the 2024 F4 Spanish Championship at Aragón as a guest driver. Coming eighth in the first race, retiring in the second race and coming 14th in the third race. Since he was a guest driver he was eligible to score points, but was also the highest finishing guest driver by the end of the season.

=== Formula Regional (2025–2026) ===
==== 2025 ====
Yamakoshi competed in the Formula Regional Middle East Championship at the beginning of 2025, racing with Pinnacle Motorsport.

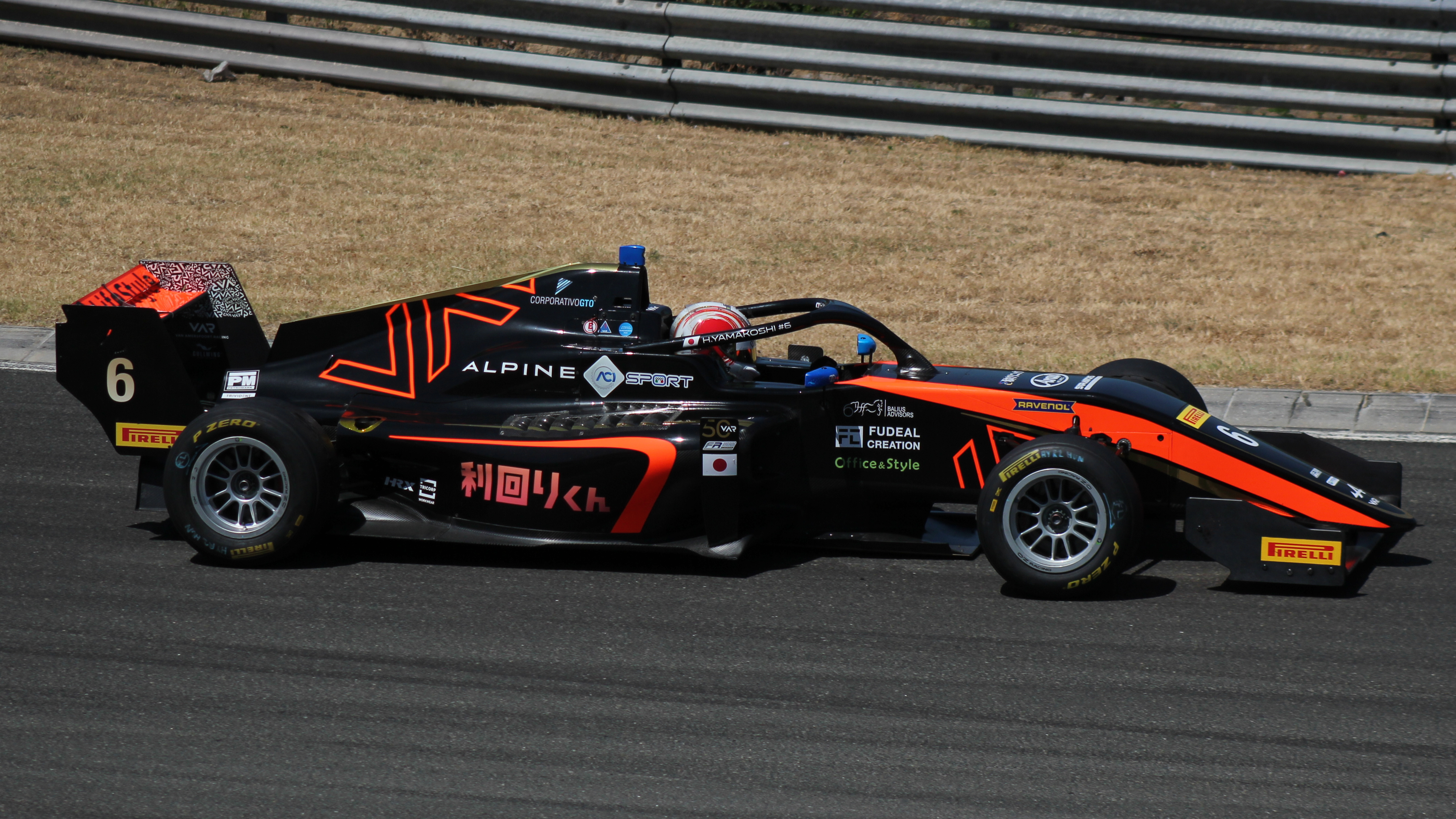
Yamakoshi driving at the Hungaroring during the 2025 Formula Regional European Championship

Yamakoshi moved up to the Formula Regional European Championship, continuing with Van Amersfoort Racing.

In April 2025, Yamakoshi signed with Hillspeed in a last-minute entry to GB3, where he partook in selected rounds of the championship.

==== 2026 ====
At the end of November, Yamakoshi will compete in the Macau Grand Prix with Pinnacle Motorsport.

=== FIA Formula 3 (2026) ===
Yamakoshi moved up to Formula 3 in 2026, extending his relationship with Van Amersfoort Racing. Yamakoshi took his maiden win in the sprint race of the second round at the Circuit de Monaco but was disqualified from the race. He earned his first legal podium a week later in the following round at the Circuit de Barcelona-Catalunya feature race, and achieved his maiden pole position a round later at the Red Bull Ring, becoming the first Japanese pole sitter in the FIA Formula 3 Championship. His second podium was achieved in the feature race of the sixth round at Circuit de Spa-Francorchamps.. Yamakoshi scored a final podium in the sprint race of the penultimate round at Monza Circuit and ended his campaign ninth in the standings.

=== FIA Formula 2 (2026) ===
==== 2026 ====
Two weeks after the Formula 3 Madrid finale, Yamakoshi was announced to drive in Formula 2 with Van Amersfoort Racing in Baku, replacing Nico Varrone. He scored his first points in the first feature race with a ninth place.

== Personal life ==
In September 2025, Yamakoshi was added to the All Road Management stable run by Nicolas Todt.

== Karting record ==
=== Karting career summary ===
Season	Series	Team	Position
2017	JAF Junior Karting Championship - FP-Jr Cadets	Garage C	6th
2017	SL Akigase Series - YAMAHA Cadets	Garage C	7th
2018	JAF Junior Karting Championship - FP-Jr	Garage C	6th
2018	Motegi Kart Race - SSJ Open	Garage C	2nd
2019	SL Akigase Series - YAMAHA SS	Garage C	6th
2019	SL National Championship - YAMAHA SS	Garage C	1st
2020	All-Japan Karting Championship - FS-125	Formula Blue Garage C	2nd
2020	SL National Championship - YAMAHA SS	Garage C	2nd
2020	IAME Series Japan - X30 Series	Garage C	3rd
2021	All-Japan Karting Championship - OK	Formula Blue Garage C	15th
2022	CIK-FIA European Championship - OK	IPK Official Racing Team	30th
2022	All-Japan Karting Championship - OK	Garage C	NC

== Racing record ==
=== Racing career summary ===
Season	Series	Team	Races	Wins	Poles	F/Laps	Podiums	Points	Position
2023	French F4 Championship	FFSA Academy	21	0	0	2	5	146	5th
2023	F4 Spanish Championship	Tecnicar - Fórmula de Campeones	15	0	0	0	0	19	14th
2023	Formula 4 UAE Championship	Pinnacle VAR	6	0	0	0	0	8	22nd
2024	Italian F4 Championship	Van Amersfoort Racing	21	2	3	3	7	220	**3rd**
2024	Euro 4 Championship	Van Amersfoort Racing	9	2	0	1	4	89	4th
2024	Formula 4 UAE Championship	Pinnacle Motorsport	3	0	0	0	0	0	32nd
2024	F4 Spanish Championship	Monlau Motorsport	3	0	0	0	0	0	NC†
2025	Formula Regional European Championship	Van Amersfoort Racing	20	0	0	0	2	86	9th
2025	Super Formula Lights	Delightworks Racing	3	0	0	0	0	7	9th
2025	Formula Regional Middle East Championship	Pinnacle Motorsport	9	0	0	0	0	29	16th
2025	GB3 Championship	Hillspeed	9	0	0	0	0	121	19th
2025	Macau Grand Prix	Evans GP	1	0	0	0	0	—N/a	12th
2026	FIA Formula 3 Championship	Van Amersfoort Racing	19	0	1	1	3	71	9th
2026	FIA Formula 2 Championship	Van Amersfoort Racing	0	0	0	0	0	0	TBD*
2026	Macau Grand Prix	Pinnacle Motorsport						—N/a	

^{*} Season still in progress.

=== Complete Formula 4 UAE Championship results ===
(key) (Races in bold indicate pole position) (Races in italics indicate fastest lap)

Year	Team	1	2	3	4	5	6	7	8	9	10	11	12	13	14	15	Pos	Points
2023	Pinnacle VAR	DUB1; 1	DUB1; 2	DUB1; 3	KMT1; 1; 17	KMT1; 2 Ret	KMT1; 3; 34	KMT2; 1; 9	KMT2; 2 Ret	KMT2; 3; 7	DUB2; 1	DUB2; 2	DUB2; 3	YMC; 1	YMC; 2	YMC; 3	22nd	8
2024	Pinnacle Motorsport	YMC1; 1	YMC1; 2	YMC1; 3	YMC2; 1	YMC2; 2	YMC2; 3	DUB1; 1	DUB1; 2	DUB1; 3	YMC3; 1; 29†	YMC3; 2; 17	YMC3; 3 Ret	DUB2; 1	DUB2; 2	DUB2; 3	32nd	0

=== Complete French F4 Championship results ===
(key) (Races in bold indicate pole position; races in italics indicate fastest lap)

Year	1	2	3	4	5	6	7	8	9	10	11	12	13	14	15	16	17	18	19	20	21	DC	Points
2023	NOG; 1; 7	NOG; 2; 7	NOG; 3; 6	MAG; 1; 5	MAG; 2; 8	MAG; 3; 3	PAU; 1; 3	PAU; 2 Ret	PAU; 3; 4	SPA; 1; 4	SPA; 2; 5	SPA; 3; 2	MIS; 1; 17	MIS; 2; 12	MIS; 3 Ret	LÉD; 1 Ret	LÉD; 2; 2	LÉD; 3; 4	LEC; 1 Ret	LEC; 2 Ret	LEC; 3; 3	5th	146

=== Complete F4 Spanish Championship results ===
(key) (Races in bold indicate pole position) (Races in italics indicate fastest lap)

Year	Team	1	2	3	4	5	6	7	8	9	10	11	12	13	14	15	16	17	18	19	20	21	DC	Points
2023	Tecnicar - Fórmula de Campeones	SPA; 1	SPA; 2	SPA; 3	ARA; 1; 9	ARA; 2 DNS	ARA; 3 Ret	NAV; 1 Ret	NAV; 2; 14	NAV; 3 Ret	JER; 1	JER; 2	JER; 3	EST; 1; 8	EST; 2; 19	EST; 3; 10	CRT; 1; 14	CRT; 2; 12	CRT; 3; 9	CAT; 1; 8	CAT; 2; 17	CAT; 3; 7	14th	19
2024	Monlau Motorsport	JAR; 1	JAR; 2	JAR; 3	POR; 1	POR; 2	POR; 3	LEC; 1	LEC; 2	LEC; 3	ARA; 1; 8	ARA; 2 Ret	ARA; 3; 12	CRT; 1	CRT; 2	CRT; 3	JER; 1	JER; 2	JER; 3	CAT; 1	CAT; 2	CAT; 3	NC†	0

† As Yamakoshi was a guest driver, he was ineligible for points

=== Complete Italian F4 Championship results ===
(key) (Races in bold indicate pole position; races in italics indicate fastest lap)

Year	Team	1	2	3	4	5	6	7	8	9	10	11	12	13	14	15	16	17	18	19	20	21	DC	Points
2024	Van Amersfoort Racing	MIS; 1; 6	MIS; 2; 4	MIS; 3; 4	**IMO**; **1**; 1	**IMO**; **2**; 1	**IMO**; **3**; 27	VLL; 1; 3	VLL; 2; 3	VLL; 3; 3	MUG; 1; 4	MUG; 2; 5	MUG; 3; 4	LEC; 1; 6	LEC; 2; 5	LEC; 3; 22	CAT; 1; 3	CAT; 2; 2	CAT; 3; 6	MNZ; 1; 12	MNZ; 2; 18	MNZ; 3; 15	3rd	220

=== Complete Euro 4 Championship results ===
(key) (Races in bold indicate pole position; races in italics indicate fastest lap)

Year	Team	1	2	3	4	5	6	7	8	9	DC	Points
2024	Van Amersfoort Racing	MUG; 1; 2	MUG; 2; 1	MUG; 3; 11	RBR; 1; 25†	RBR; 2; 3	RBR; 3; 1	MNZ; 1; 11	MNZ; 2; 7	MNZ; 3; 15	4th	89

=== Complete Formula Regional Middle East Championship results ===
(key) (Races in bold indicate pole position) (Races in italics indicate fastest lap)

Year	Entrant	1	2	3	4	5	6	7	8	9	10	11	12	13	14	15	DC	Points
2025	Pinnacle Motorsport	YMC1; 1	YMC1; 2	YMC1; 3	YMC2; 1	YMC2; 2	YMC2; 3	DUB; 1; 26†	DUB; 2; 19	DUB; 3; 8	YMC3; 1; 17	YMC3; 2; 9	YMC3; 3; 5	LUS; 1; 10	LUS; 2; 22†	LUS; 3; 9	16th	29

=== Complete GB3 Championship results ===
(key) (Races in bold indicate pole position) (Races in italics indicate fastest lap)

Year	Team	1	2	3	4	5	6	7	8	9	10	11	12	13	14	15	16	17	18	19	20	21	22	23	24	DC	Points
2025	Hillspeed	SIL1; 1; 12	SIL1; 2; 10	SIL1; 3; 4^{8}	ZAN; 1	ZAN; 2	ZAN; 3	SPA; 1; 10	SPA; 2; 5	SPA; 3; 19	HUN; 1	HUN; 2	HUN; 3	SIL2; 1	SIL2; 2	SIL2; 3	BRH; 1; 6	BRH; 2; 6	BRH; 3; 4^{3}	DON; 1	DON; 2	DON; 3	MNZ; 1	MNZ; 2	MNZ; 3	19th	121

=== Complete Formula Regional European Championship results ===
(key) (Races in bold indicate pole position) (Races in italics indicate fastest lap)

Year	Team	1	2	3	4	5	6	7	8	9	10	11	12	13	14	15	16	17	18	19	20	DC	Points
2025	Van Amersfoort Racing	MIS; 1; 8	MIS; 2; 9	SPA; 1; 5	SPA; 2; 2	ZAN; 1; 7	ZAN; 2; 2	HUN; 1; 6	HUN; 2; 8	LEC; 1; 6	LEC; 2; 12	IMO; 1 Ret	IMO; 2; 11	RBR; 1; 6	RBR; 2; 11	CAT; 1 Ret	CAT; 2; 15	HOC; 1; 14	HOC; 2; 24	MNZ; 1 Ret	MNZ; 2 Ret	9th	86

=== Complete Macau Grand Prix results ===
Year	Team	Car	Qualifying	Quali Race	Main Race
2025	(Australia) Evans GP	Tatuus F3 T-318	16th	16th	12th
2026	(Republic of Ireland) Pinnacle Motorsport	Tatuus T-326	TBD	TBD	TBD

=== Complete Super Formula Lights results ===
(key) (Races in bold indicate pole position) (Races in italics indicate fastest lap)

Year	Entrant	1	2	3	4	5	6	7	8	9	10	11	12	13	14	15	16	17	18	Pos	Points
2025	Delightworks Racing	SUZ; 1	SUZ; 2	SUZ; 3	AUT; 1	AUT; 2	AUT; 3	OKA; 1	OKA; 2	OKA; 3	SUG; 1	SUG; 2	SUG; 3	FUJ; 1	FUJ; 2	FUJ; 3	MOT; 1; 5	MOT; 2; 5	MOT; 3; 4	9th	7

=== Complete FIA Formula 3 Championship results ===
(key) (Races in bold indicate pole position) (Races in italics indicate fastest lap)

Year	Entrant	1	2	3	4	5	6	7	8	9	10	11	12	13	14	15	16	17	18	19	DC	Points
2026	Van Amersfoort Racing	MEL; SPR; 20	MEL; FEA; 11	MON; SPR; DSQ	MON; FEA; 13	CAT; SPR; 7	CAT; FEA; 2	RBR; SPR; 8	**RBR**; **FEA**; 8	SIL; SPR; 12	SIL; FEA; 8	SPA; SPR; 26	SPA; FEA; 2	HUN; SPR; 26	HUN; FEA; 10	MNZ; SPR; 3	MNZ; FEA; 6	MAD; SPR; 17	MAD; FEA1; 15	MAD; FEA2; Ret	9th	71

=== Complete FIA Formula 2 Championship results ===
(key) (Races in bold indicate pole position) (Races in italics indicate fastest lap)

Year	Entrant	1	2	3	4	5	6	7	8	9	10	11	12	13	14	15	16	17	18	19	20	21	22	23	24	25	26	27	28	29	DC	Points
2026	Van Amersfoort Racing	MEL; SPR	MEL; FEA	MIA; SPR	MIA; FEA	MTL; SPR	MTL; FEA	MON; SPR	MON; FEA	CAT; SPR	CAT; FEA	RBR; SPR	RBR; FEA	SIL; SPR	SIL; FEA	SPA; SPR	SPA; FEA	HUN; SPR	HUN; FEA	MNZ; SPR	MNZ; FEA	MAD; SPR	MAD; FEA	BAK; SPR; 17	BAK; FEA1; 9	BAK; FEA2; 14	LSL; SPR	LSL; FEA	YMC; SPR	YMC; FEA	23rd*	2*

* Season still in progress.
