= 2026 Formula 2 Championship =

Motor racing championship

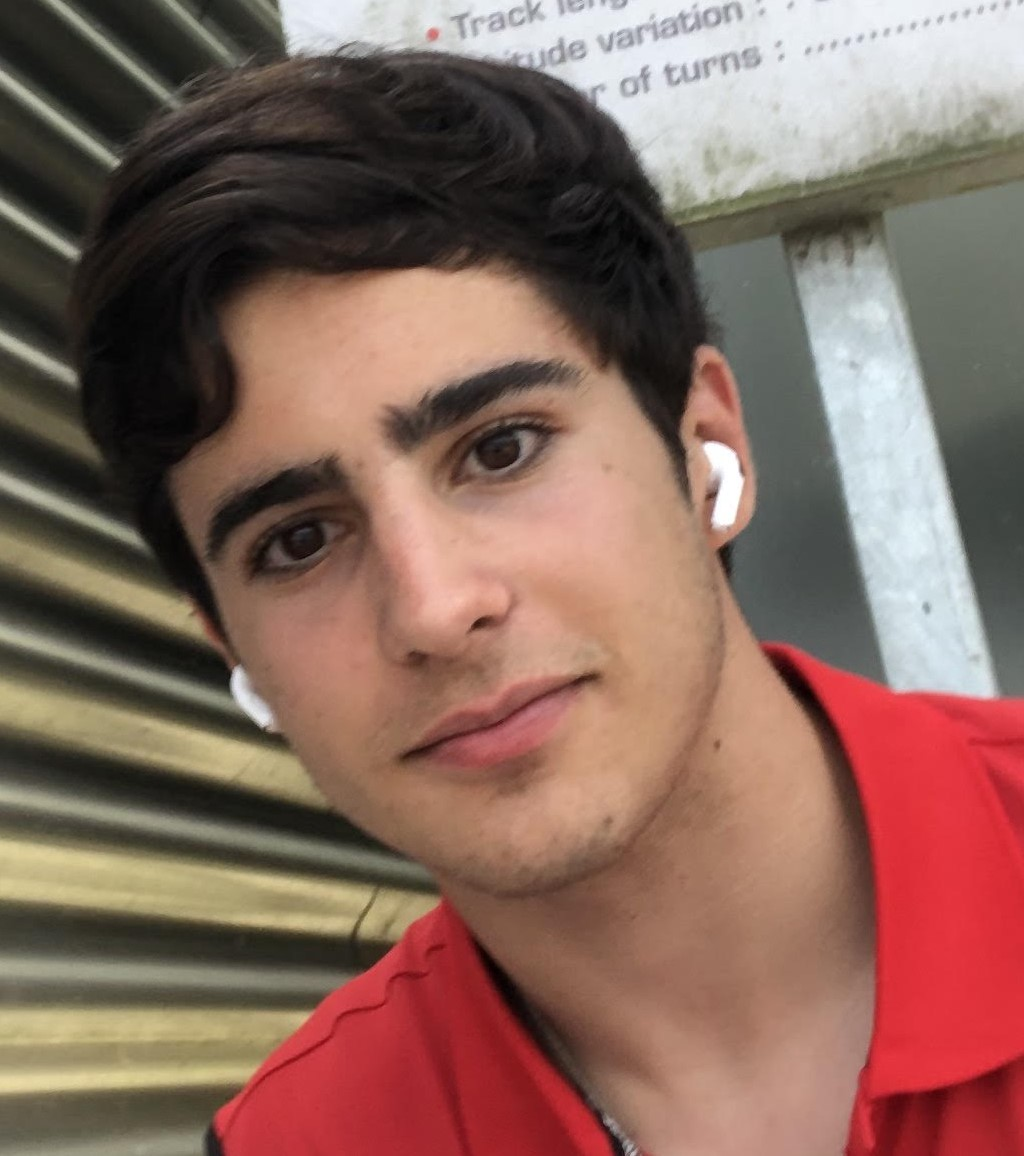
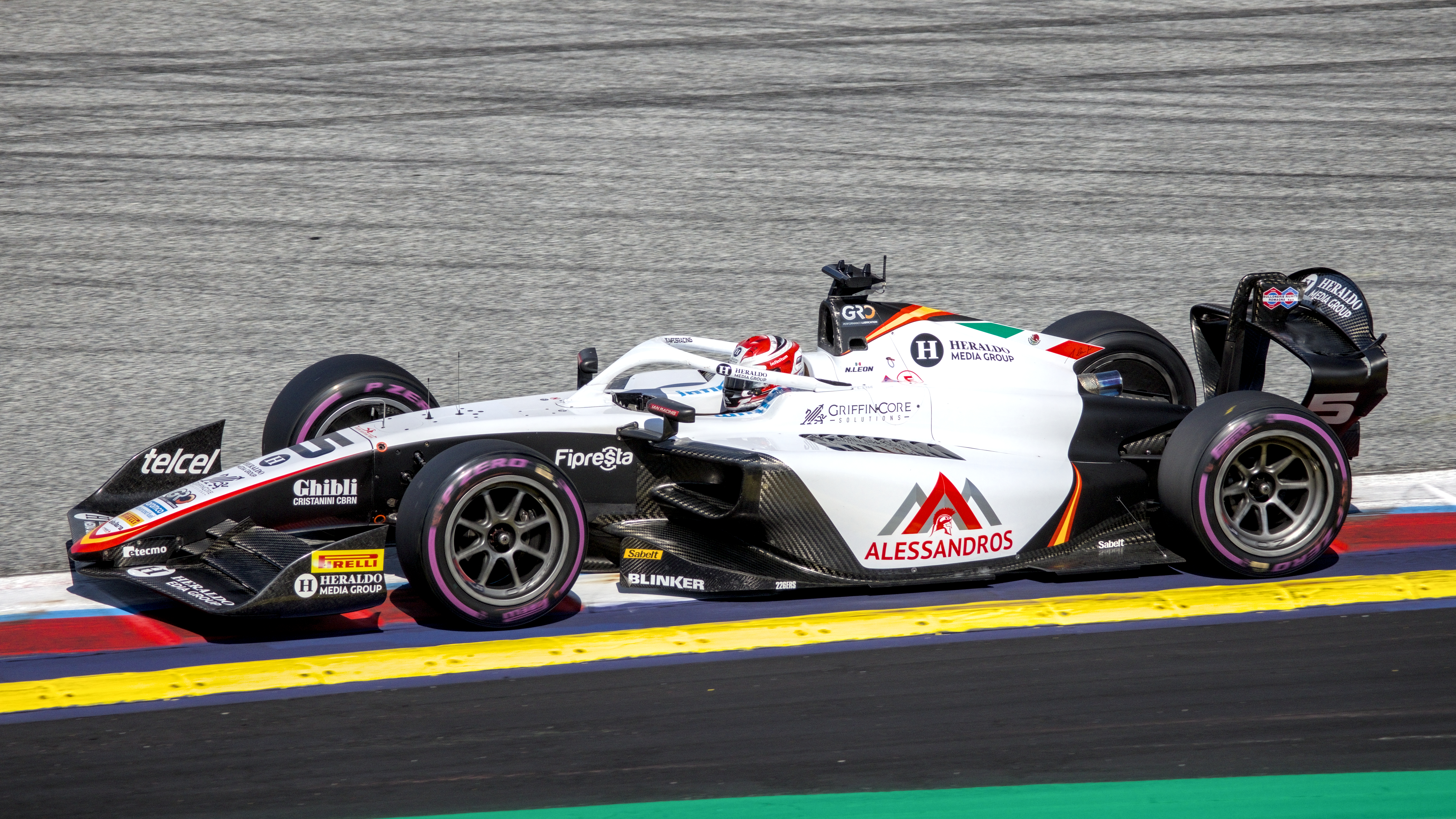
Rafael Câmara, driving for Invicta Racing, leads the Drivers' Championship, while Campos Racing lead the Teams' Championship.

The 2026 FIA Formula 2 Championship is a motor racing championship for Formula 2 cars sanctioned by the Fédération Internationale de l'Automobile (FIA). The championship is the sixtieth season of Formula 2 racing and the tenth season run under the FIA Formula 2 Championship moniker. Formula 2 is an open-wheel racing category serving as the second tier of formula racing in the FIA Global Pathway. The category is run in support of selected rounds of the 2026 Formula One World Championship. As the championship is a spec series, all teams and drivers competing in the championship run the same car, the Dallara F2 2024.

Invicta Racing entered the championship as the reigning Teams' Champions, having secured their title at the final race of the previous season in Abu Dhabi.

== Entries ==
The following teams and drivers are contracted to compete in the 2026 Formula 2 Championship. As the championship is a spec series, all teams compete with an identical Dallara F2 2024 chassis using a V6 turbo engine developed by Mecachrome. All teams compete with tyres supplied by Pirelli.

Team	No.	Driver	Rounds
(United Kingdom) Invicta Racing	1	(Brazil) Rafael Câmara	1–12
(United Kingdom) Invicta Racing	2	(Paraguay) Joshua Dürksen	1–12
(United Kingdom) Hitech	3	(Japan) Ritomo Miyata	1–12
(United Kingdom) Hitech	4	(United States) Colton Herta	1–12 (Note: Colton Herta was entered into the Madrid round, but later withdrew after feeling unwell.)
(Spain) Campos Racing	5	(Mexico) Noel León	1–12
(Spain) Campos Racing	6	(Bulgaria) Nikola Tsolov	1–12
(France) DAMS Lucas Oil	7	(Sweden) Dino Beganovic	1–12
(France) DAMS Lucas Oil	8	(Poland) Roman Bilinski	1–12
(Netherlands) MP Motorsport	9	(Italy) Gabriele Minì	1–12
(Netherlands) MP Motorsport	10	(Germany) Oliver Goethe	1–12
(Italy) Prema Racing	11	(Colombia) Sebastián Montoya	1–12
(Italy) Prema Racing	12	(Spain) Mari Boya	1–12
(New Zealand) Rodin Motorsport	14	(Norway) Martinius Stenshorne	1–12
(New Zealand) Rodin Motorsport	15	(Republic of Ireland) Alex Dunne	1–12
(France) ART Grand Prix	16	(India) Kush Maini	1–12
(France) ART Grand Prix	17	(Thailand) Tasanapol Inthraphuvasak	1–12 (Note: Tasanapol Inthraphuvasak was entered into the Montreal round, but later withdrew following a crash in qualifying.)
(United Arab Emirates) AIX Racing	20	(Brazil) Emerson Fittipaldi Jr.	1–12
(United Arab Emirates) AIX Racing	21	(United Kingdom) Cian Shields	1–12
(Netherlands) Van Amersfoort Racing	22	(Argentina) Nico Varrone	1–11
(Netherlands) Van Amersfoort Racing	22	(Japan) Hiyu Yamakoshi	12
(Netherlands) Van Amersfoort Racing	23	(Mexico) Rafael Villagómez	1–12
(Italy) Trident	24	(Netherlands) Laurens van Hoepen	1–12
(Italy) Trident	25	(United Kingdom) John Bennett	1–12

=== Team changes ===
Hitech ended their partnership with Toyota Gazoo Racing after one season, dropping the 'TGR' moniker from its name.

=== Driver changes ===
Reigning teams' champions Invicta Racing have an all-new driver lineup as reigning drivers' champion Leonardo Fornaroli joined the McLaren F1 Team as a reserve driver and Roman Staněk left Formula 2 to join Kondo Racing's Buzz MK Racing offshoot in Super Formula. Invicta signed 2025 FIA Formula 3 Champion and Ferrari Driver Academy driver Rafael Câmara from Trident, and Joshua Dürksen, who left AIX Racing after finishing the 2025 campaign ninth to join the team for his third season in the championship.

Hitech saw Dino Beganovic move to DAMS Lucas Oil and Luke Browning leave the series to compete in Super Formula with Kondo Racing. They signed Cadillac F1 test driver Colton Herta for his Formula 2 debut. He moved over from the IndyCar Series, where he won nine races over eight years and ended the 2025 season in seventh driving for Andretti Global. The team also signed former Super Formula champion Ritomo Miyata, who embarks on his third F2 campaign after coming 17th with ART Grand Prix in 2025.

Campos Racing saw Pepe Martí graduate to Formula E with Cupra Kiro ahead of the penultimate round of the 2025 season, and Arvid Lindblad graduate to Formula One with Racing Bulls. 2025 FIA F3 runner-up and Red Bull Junior Team driver Nikola Tsolov, who already replaced Martí for the final two rounds of the 2025 season, stayed with Campos for his full-season graduation. He was joined by Noel León, who also stepped up from FIA F3 after finishing the 2025 season in 17th driving for Prema Racing.

DAMS Lucas Oil have a new lineup as Kush Maini moved to ART Grand Prix and Jak Crawford left the series to join the Aston Martin F1 Team as their third driver. Ferrari Driver Academy member Dino Beganovic returned to the team where he made his F2 debut in 2024 as he departed Hitech, with whom he finished seventh in 2025, and Roman Bilinski made his series debut after finishing eleventh in FIA F3 with Rodin Motorsport.

Richard Verschoor left MP Motorsport after spending five seasons in the category to join Duqueine Team in the European Le Mans Series' LMP2 class. His replacement was Gabriele Minì, who finished his first full season in F2 in 13th driving for Prema Racing.

Prema Racing replaced MP-bound Minì with Aston Martin junior driver Mari Boya, who graduated from FIA F3 after finishing the 2025 season in third with Campos Racing.

Rodin Motorsport driver Amaury Cordeel left Formula 2 ahead of the final two rounds of the 2025 season to join Team WRT in the GT World Challenge Europe. To replace him, the team signed Martinius Stenshorne for his full-season debut after he had already entered the Baku round of the 2025 season with Trident before deputising for Cordeel during the final two rounds of 2025. He stepped up from FIA F3, where he came fifth in 2025 with Hitech.

ART Grand Prix saw Ritomo Miyata move to Hitech, while Victor Martins left Formula 2 after three seasons to join Alpine for their WEC Hypercar programme and the Williams F1 Team as a test and development driver. The team signed Thai driver Tasanapol Inthraphuvasak, who finished seventh with Campos Racing in the 2025 FIA F3 season and already made his F2 debut in the 2025 season finale driving for Trident, and Kush Maini, who joined ART for his fourth F2 season after finishing 16th in 2025 with DAMS.

Joshua Dürksen left AIX Racing after two seasons of driving for the team, to join Invicta Racing. To replace him, AIX signed Emerson Fittipaldi Jr., who stepped up from Eurocup-3, where he drove for MP Motorsport.

Van Amersfoort Racing saw John Bennett move to Trident. 2023 FIA WEC LMGTE Am Champion and 24 Hours of Le Mans winner Nico Varrone, who last competed in single-seaters in the 2020 BRDC British Formula 3 Championship, replaced him.

Trident have an all-new lineup as Max Esterson and Sami Meguetounif, who raced for the majority of 2025, did not return to the series, with Esterson joining RLL Team McLaren in IMSA's GTD class, and Meguetounif joining TDS Racing in the European Le Mans Series' LMP2 class. The team signed John Bennett, who finished his debut F2 season 22nd with Van Amersfoort Racing, and FIA F3 driver Laurens van Hoepen, who came 12th with ART Grand Prix and already raced with Trident for the last three rounds of 2025.

==== In-season changes ====
Ahead of the round at Baku City Circuit, Nico Varrone announced he had parted ways with Van Amersfoort Racing. He was replaced by Hiyu Yamakoshi, who steps up from FIA Formula 3, where he finished ninth after claiming three podiums for the team.

Rafael Câmara was promoted to the Haas F1 Team ahead of the São Paulo Grand Prix to replace Esteban Ocon for the rest of the season, ending his rookie Formula 2 campaign with two rounds to go.

== Calendar ==
Round	Circuit	Sprint race	Feature race(s)
1	(Australia) Albert Park Circuit, Melbourne	7 March	8 March
2	(United States) Miami International Autodrome, Miami Gardens, Florida	2 May	3 May
3	(Canada) Circuit Gilles Villeneuve, Montreal	23 May	24 May
4	Circuit de Monaco, Monaco	6 June	7 June
5	(Spain) Circuit de Barcelona-Catalunya, Montmeló	13 June	14 June
6	(Austria) Red Bull Ring, Spielberg	27 June	28 June
7	(United Kingdom) Silverstone Circuit, Silverstone	4 July	5 July
8	(Belgium) Circuit de Spa-Francorchamps, Stavelot	18 July	19 July
9	(Hungary) Hungaroring, Mogyoród	25 July	26 July
10	(Italy) Monza Circuit, Monza	5 September	6 September
11	(Spain) Madring, Madrid	12 September	13 September
12	(Azerbaijan) Baku City Circuit, Baku	25 September (Note: The races of the Baku round were originally scheduled for 26–27 September but were moved forward by one day to accommodate Remembrance Day, following a request from the promoter and relevant government stakeholders.)	25–26 September
13	(Qatar) Lusail International Circuit, Lusail	28 November	29 November
14	(United Arab Emirates) Yas Marina Circuit, Abu Dhabi	5 December	6 December

=== Calendar changes ===
- Formula 2 and FIA Formula 3 followed Formula One in replacing the round at Imola Circuit with a second round in Spain held at the newly-built Madring.
- The round at Baku City Circuit was held a day earlier in the week than usual, with the sprint race held on Friday and the feature race held on Saturday, to accommodate the country's national day. On 14 September, Formula 2 announced that the Baku round would be "supersized", featuring an additional qualifying session and a second feature race.
- Two rounds were set to be held at Bahrain International Circuit and Jeddah Corniche Circuit, but were cancelled due to the Iran war. They were replaced by rounds at Miami International Autodrome and Circuit Gilles Villeneuve, marking the first time the championship raced in North America.

== Regulation changes ==
2025 saw the championship use Aramco-supplied fuel containing 70% sustainable components, and a further increase in sustainability is planned for 2026 ahead of the series' goal of adopting fully synthetic fuels in 2027.

== Season report ==
=== Round 1: Australia ===
The season-opener at Albert Park Circuit began with Dino Beganovic qualifying on pole position followed by Martinius Stenshorne in second and Alex Dunne in third. Tasanapol Inthraphuvasak started the reverse-grid sprint race from pole position by virtue of having qualified tenth. Third-place starter Oliver Goethe gained a position from Joshua Dürksen at the start, but later lost the place and then spun out. Dürksen then overtook Inthraphuvasak for the lead on lap two. On lap fifteen, Mari Boya crashed and brought out the safety car. Noel León, who started seventh but had improved to third place, overtook Inthraphuvasak for second shortly after racing resumed. Inthraphuvasak was then passed by Stenshorne and Dunne in the closing laps, however Stenshorne was demoted from the podium with a penalty for leaving the track and gaining an advantage, promoting Dunne to third. Dürksen claimed his fifth Formula 2 race win and León achieved a podium in his debut Formula 2 race.

In the feature race, a slow start from pole-sitter Beganovic dropped him to fifth place at the first corner. A collision between teammates Stenshorne and Dunne on lap three eliminated both drivers from the race and allowed Nikola Tsolov into the lead. Most drivers were running the softest tyre compound and thus made pit stops in the early laps. After the pit stops, Tsolov maintained his position with Rafael Câmara behind. Beganovic had recovered from his poor start and overtook Câmara on lap fifteen, but soon stopped on-track with a mechanical failure, causing a safety car deployment. Race leader Nico Varrone, who was yet to pit, made his tyre change under the safety car conditions and emerged in first place. Varrone was unable to hold the lead for long and soon received a penalty for speeding in the pit lane, dropping him outside the points. Tsolov crossed the finish line to take his first Formula 2 victory, followed by Câmara and 11th-place starter Laurens van Hoepen, who both achieved their first Formula 2 podium finishes. Tsolov's victory put him in the lead of the championship after the first round, seven points ahead of Câmara in second.

=== Round 2: United States ===
The championship's debut appearance at the Miami International Autodrome began with Kush Maini on pole position and Rafael Câmara and Martinius Stenshorne qualifying second and third respectively. Nikola Tsolov started the sprint race from first place ahead of Laurens van Hoepen. Joshua Dürksen improved from fourth to second in the early laps but later dropped positions. Van Hoepen and Tsolov then fought for the lead during the second half of the race; van Hoepen took the position on the final lap but Tsolov reclaimed the place in the final few corners. Tsolov achieved his second consecutive victory and van Hoepen a second consecutive podium finish. Alex Dunne, who started seventh, completed the podium.

The feature race took place in wet conditions. Stenshorne overtook Câmara for second place at the start, although Stenshorne was soon required to serve a stop-go penalty for a procedural infringement by his team, promoting Dürksen to third place. Tsolov and Tasanapol Inthraphuvasak collided at the first corner, eliminating Tsolov from the race and bringing out the safety car. A crash for Dunne on lap 10 caused another safety car deployment, eliminating the lead built by polesitter Maini. Most drivers now made pit stops and Câmara was able to exit the pit lane ahead of Maini. Dürksen now led the race as one of the few drivers not to pit, but dropped out of the podium positions when he stopped later. Maini soon lost further positions to Dino Beganovic (who had started 11th but gained a number of positions on the first lap), Noel León and Gabriele Minì. On the penultimate lap, Beganovic challenged Câmara for the lead but their battle allowed Minì to close in. Minì soon passed both drivers to take his first Formula 2 race win, with Beganovic second and Câmara third. Minì's victory promoted him to second in the Drivers' Championship, one point behind Tsolov.

=== Round 3: Canada ===
The championship made its first appearance at Circuit Gilles Villeneuve. Qualifying saw Laurens van Hoepen qualify his Trident car on pole, with the reverse-grid sprint placing Noel León on pole. In the sprint race, León controlled a chaotic 28-lap contest that featured multiple Safety Car periods and a late Virtual Safety Car. He resisted early pressure and managed the restarts cleanly to take his maiden Formula 2 victory by 3.7 seconds. Gabriele Minì finished second, with Martinius Stenshorne third for Rodin Motorsport. Several drivers received penalties for incidents or track limits, shuffling the midfield order. The feature race produced a 1-2 result for Rodin Motorsport. Stenshorne converted a solid strategy into victory ahead of teammate Alex Dunne, with Minì third. Nikola Tsolov recovered to fourth after contact with Kush Maini but was penalised, while pole-sitter Van Hoepen crashed at the Wall of Champions. The weekend left the Drivers' Championship tightly contested, with Minì, Câmara and Tsolov all within a handful of points of one another and Campos Racing beginning to assert itself at the top of the Teams’ Championship.

=== Round 4: Monaco ===
Qualifying through the narrow streets of the Circuit de Monaco saw Rafael Câmara take his first pole position of the season for Invicta Racing. In the reverse-grid sprint race, Noel León capitalized on his front-row start to take the lead into Sainte Dévote. León maintained a disciplined pace, controlling multiple safety car restarts across the tight layout to take his second consecutive sprint victory for Campos Racing, while teammate Nikola Tsolov set the fastest lap en route to a podium finish. The feature race was headlined by pit strategy around the mandatory tyre stop. Polesitter Câmara led the opening stint under heavy pressure from Tsolov. Campos Racing opted for an aggressive overcut, allowing Tsolov to pump in fast sector times and take the fastest lap in clean air. When Tsolov emerged from his pit stop, he narrowly rejoined ahead of Câmara at Massenet. Tsolov held off Câmara's advances through the closing laps to claim his second feature race victory of the year, sealing a double win on the weekend for Campos Racing.

=== Round 5: Spain (Barcelona) ===
At the Circuit de Barcelona-Catalunya, Rafael Câmara took his second consecutive feature race pole position, narrowly beating Kush Maini in qualifying. In the sprint race, Maini produced an untouchable drive for ART Grand Prix, converting a strong grid position into the race win while also setting the fastest lap. The feature race saw Câmara convert his pole into an immediate lead, fending off an early attack into Turn 1. While John Bennett set the fastest lap for Trident during a charging alternate-strategy stint, Câmara managed his high tyre degradation flawlessly across the stint. The Brazilian crossed the line to score his first Formula 2 victory and a maiden win for Invicta Racing, tightening the fight at the top of the Drivers' Championship with Tsolov.

=== Round 6: Austria ===
Qualifying at the Red Bull Ring saw Noel León capture his maiden Formula 2 pole position for Campos Racing. In the sprint race, Trident's John Bennett took advantage of reverse-grid positioning and early-lap scuffles to assume the lead. Despite late pressure and a fastest-lap charge from Rafael Câmara, Bennett held his nerve to score his first Formula 2 victory. The feature race began with León leading away from pole, but high tyre wear and safety car interventions shuffled the order. Nikola Tsolov carved his way through the podium places and executed a decisive overtake on León into Turn 3 following the pit window. Despite Oliver Goethe snatching the fastest lap on fresh rubber late in the race, Tsolov controlled the remaining laps to take his third victory of the season, consolidating Campos Racing's lead in the Teams' Championship.

=== Round 7: United Kingdom ===
Championship protagonist Rafael Câmara claimed pole position in a closely contested qualifying session at Silverstone Circuit. In the sprint race, mixed conditions challenged the field. Nikola Tsolov delivered a masterclass in car placement and tyre warming, advancing through the top ten to take victory for Campos Racing, while Cian Shields claimed the fastest lap of the race. The feature race saw Câmara lead early from pole, but alternate pit strategies once again played a pivotal role around the abrasive circuit. Tsolov undercut the leaders during the pit cycle and emerged with superior tyre life. León set the fastest lap of the race during his recovery drive, but Tsolov could not be caught out front. Tsolov crossed the line to complete a rare weekend sweep, taking both sprint and feature race wins to extend his advantage in the title race.

=== Round 8: Belgium ===
At the high-speed Circuit de Spa-Francorchamps, Rafael Câmara continued his qualifying dominance by securing another pole position. The sprint race saw Joshua Dürksen scythe through from the top ten, displaying exceptional straight-line speed along the Kemmel Straight to take his second sprint win of the campaign for Invicta Racing, with Martinius Stenshorne setting the fastest lap. The feature race was completely dominated by Câmara. Starting from pole, he maintained the lead through La Source, dictated the safety car restarts, and set the fastest lap on his way to an emphatic lights-to-flag victory. With Dürksen finishing strongly behind him, Invicta Racing achieved maximum points across the weekend, closing the gap to Campos in the standings.

=== Round 9: Hungary ===
The technical Hungaroring saw Kush Maini take his second pole position of the season for ART Grand Prix. In the sprint race, Gabriele Minì delivered a measured defensive drive for MP Motorsport around the tight layout, keeping the pack behind him to secure his second win of the season, while Roman Bilinski posted the fastest lap. The feature race was decided by strategic execution in high track temperatures. Maini led from pole, but an overcut strategy by Campos Racing allowed Noel León to jump into net race lead following the pit stops. Despite Martinius Stenshorne setting the fastest lap during a late charge, León absorbed heavy pressure in the final laps to claim his second victory of the year and his maiden feature race win.

=== Round 10: Italy ===
The series arrived at the Monza Circuit with Rafael Câmara securing pole position at the "Temple of Speed". The weekend belonged entirely to Joshua Dürksen and Invicta Racing. In the sprint race, Dürksen navigated high-speed slipstreaming battles and repeated chicanes, claiming victory alongside the fastest lap of the race. Dürksen repeated his heroics in the feature race. Starting from the second row, he passed Câmara into the Variante del Rettifilo after the pit-stop phase and defended vigorously to complete a clean sweep of both races at Monza. Despite Câmara picking up the fastest lap, Dürksen's double victory catapulted him up the Drivers' Championship standings and gave Invicta Racing a home-soil triumph.

=== Round 11: Spain (Madrid) ===
The championship visited the new Madring circuit for the first time. Qualifying saw Dino Beganovic return to the top of the timesheets with pole position for DAMS Lucas Oil. The sprint race produced drama as Ritomo Miyata claimed a breakthrough maiden victory for Hitech, managing degradation through the technical sectors while Cian Shields logged the fastest lap. The feature race was a redemptive performance for Beganovic. After an early-season plagued by mechanical retirements and poor starts, the Swede executed a faultless lights-to-flag drive from pole position. Although Alex Dunne claimed the fastest lap with a late-stop charge, Beganovic crossed the line to take his first win of the 2026 season for DAMS, leaving the championship wide open as the paddock prepared for the flyaway rounds.

=== Round 12: Azerbaijan ===
Qualifying at Baku City Circuit saw Rodin Motorsport take both poles for the weekend, with Alex Dunne taking pole for Race 1, and Martinius Stenshorne taking pole for Race 2.

Rodin Motorsport finished 1-2 in Feature Race 1, with Alex Dunne taking the victory, followed by teammate Martinius Stenshorne, in a race that saw 8 drivers retire, including Dunne's championship rival Nikola Tsolov

Alex Dunne won Feature Race 2 on the road, but was classified 3rd due to a 5-second time penalty for crossing the line at pit entry. Rafael Câmara inherited first place, while Nikola Tsolov inherited 2nd. This put Câmara 7 points ahead of Tsolov in the championship, but it would turn out to be his final race, as he abruptly left the series to race in Formula One with Haas for the last two months of the season.

== Results and standings ==
=== Season summary ===
Round		Circuit	Pole position	Fastest lap	Winning driver	Winning team	Report
1	SR	(Australia) Albert Park Circuit		(Norway) Martinius Stenshorne	(Paraguay) Joshua Dürksen	(United Kingdom) Invicta Racing	Report
1	FR	(Australia) Albert Park Circuit	(Sweden) Dino Beganovic	(Sweden) Dino Beganovic (Note: Dino Beganovic set the fastest lap but did not finish in the top ten, so he was ineligible to score the point for it. Laurens van Hoepen scored the point for setting the fastest lap among those finishing in the top ten.)	(Bulgaria) Nikola Tsolov	(Spain) Campos Racing	Report
2	SR	(United States) Miami International Autodrome		(Mexico) Noel León	(Bulgaria) Nikola Tsolov	(Spain) Campos Racing	Report
2	FR	(United States) Miami International Autodrome	(India) Kush Maini	(Brazil) Rafael Câmara	(Italy) Gabriele Minì	(Netherlands) MP Motorsport	Report
3	SR	(Canada) Circuit Gilles Villeneuve		(Republic of Ireland) Alex Dunne (Note: Alex Dunne set the fastest lap but did not finish in the top ten, so he was ineligible to score the point for it. Noel León scored the point for setting the fastest lap among those finishing in the top ten.)	(Mexico) Noel León	(Spain) Campos Racing	Report
3	FR	(Canada) Circuit Gilles Villeneuve	(Netherlands) Laurens van Hoepen	(Argentina) Nico Varrone	(Norway) Martinius Stenshorne	(New Zealand) Rodin Motorsport	Report
4	SR	Circuit de Monaco		(Bulgaria) Nikola Tsolov	(Mexico) Noel León	(Spain) Campos Racing	Report
4	FR	Circuit de Monaco	(Brazil) Rafael Câmara	(Bulgaria) Nikola Tsolov	(Bulgaria) Nikola Tsolov	(Spain) Campos Racing	Report
5	SR	(Spain) Circuit de Barcelona-Catalunya		(India) Kush Maini	(India) Kush Maini	(France) ART Grand Prix	Report
5	FR	(Spain) Circuit de Barcelona-Catalunya	(Brazil) Rafael Câmara	(United Kingdom) John Bennett	(Brazil) Rafael Câmara	(United Kingdom) Invicta Racing	Report
6	SR	(Austria) Red Bull Ring		(Brazil) Rafael Câmara	(United Kingdom) John Bennett	(Italy) Trident	Report
6	FR	(Austria) Red Bull Ring	(Mexico) Noel León	(Germany) Oliver Goethe	(Bulgaria) Nikola Tsolov	(Spain) Campos Racing	Report
7	SR	(United Kingdom) Silverstone Circuit		(United Kingdom) Cian Shields (Note: Cian Shields set the fastest lap but did not finish in the top ten, so he was ineligible to score the point for it. Dino Beganovic scored the point for setting the fastest lap among those finishing in the top ten.)	(Bulgaria) Nikola Tsolov	(Spain) Campos Racing	Report
7	FR	(United Kingdom) Silverstone Circuit	(Brazil) Rafael Câmara	(Mexico) Noel León	(Bulgaria) Nikola Tsolov	(Spain) Campos Racing	Report
8	SR	(Belgium) Circuit de Spa-Francorchamps		(Norway) Martinius Stenshorne	(Paraguay) Joshua Dürksen	(United Kingdom) Invicta Racing	Report
8	FR	(Belgium) Circuit de Spa-Francorchamps	(Brazil) Rafael Câmara	(Brazil) Rafael Câmara	(Brazil) Rafael Câmara	(United Kingdom) Invicta Racing	Report
9	SR	(Hungary) Hungaroring		(Poland) Roman Bilinski (Note: Roman Bilinski set the fastest lap but did not finish in the top ten, so he was ineligible to score the point for it. Gabriele Minì scored the point for setting the fastest lap among those finishing in the top ten.)	(Italy) Gabriele Minì	(Netherlands) MP Motorsport	Report
9	FR	(Hungary) Hungaroring	(India) Kush Maini	(Norway) Martinius Stenshorne (Note: Martinius Stenshorne set the fastest lap but did not finish in the top ten, so he was ineligible to score the point for it. Kush Maini scored the point for setting the fastest lap among those finishing in the top ten.)	(Mexico) Noel León	(Spain) Campos Racing	Report
10	SR	(Italy) Monza Circuit		(Paraguay) Joshua Dürksen	(Paraguay) Joshua Dürksen	(United Kingdom) Invicta Racing	Report
10	FR	(Italy) Monza Circuit	(Brazil) Rafael Câmara	(Brazil) Rafael Câmara	(Paraguay) Joshua Dürksen	(United Kingdom) Invicta Racing	Report
11	SR	(Spain) Madring		(United Kingdom) Cian Shields (Note: Cian Shields set the fastest lap but did not finish in the top ten, so he was ineligible to score the point for it. Ritomo Miyata scored the point for setting the fastest lap among those finishing in the top ten.)	(Japan) Ritomo Miyata	(United Kingdom) Hitech	Report
11	FR	(Spain) Madring	(Sweden) Dino Beganovic	(Republic of Ireland) Alex Dunne	(Sweden) Dino Beganovic	(France) DAMS Lucas Oil	Report
12	SR	(Azerbaijan) Baku City Circuit		(Brazil) Rafael Câmara (Note: Rafael Câmara set the fastest lap but did not finish in the top ten, so he was ineligible to score the point for it. Alex Dunne scored the point for setting the fastest lap among those finishing in the top ten.)	(Sweden) Dino Beganovic	(France) DAMS Lucas Oil	Report
12	FR1	(Azerbaijan) Baku City Circuit	(Republic of Ireland) Alex Dunne	(Republic of Ireland) Alex Dunne	(Republic of Ireland) Alex Dunne	(New Zealand) Rodin Motorsport	Report
12	FR2	(Azerbaijan) Baku City Circuit	(Norway) Martinius Stenshorne	(Colombia) Sebastián Montoya (Note: Sebastián Montoya set the fastest lap but did not finish in the top ten, so he was ineligible to score the point for it. Nikola Tsolov scored the point for setting the fastest lap among those finishing in the top ten.)	(Brazil) Rafael Câmara	(United Kingdom) Invicta Racing	Report
13	SR	(Qatar) Lusail International Circuit					Report
13	FR	(Qatar) Lusail International Circuit					Report
14	SR	(United Arab Emirates) Yas Marina Circuit					Report
14	FR	(United Arab Emirates) Yas Marina Circuit					Report

=== Scoring system ===
Points are awarded to the top eight classified finishers in the sprint race, and to the top ten classified finishers in the feature race. (Note: In the event of a race ending prematurely, the number of points-paying positions may be reduced, depending on how much of the race has been completed.) The pole-sitter in the feature race also receives two points, and one point is given to the driver within the top ten who set the fastest lap in both the feature and sprint races. No extra points are awarded to the pole-sitter in the sprint race as the grid for it is set by reversing the top ten qualifiers.

Sprint race points

Points are awarded to the top eight classified finishers. A bonus points is awarded to the driver who set the fastest lap within the top ten finishers.

Position	1st	2nd	3rd	4th	5th	6th	7th	8th	FL
Points	10	8	6	5	4	3	2	1	1

Feature race points

Points are awarded to the top ten classified finishers. Bonus points are awarded to the pole-sitter and to the driver who set the fastest lap within the top ten finishers.

Position	1st	2nd	3rd	4th	5th	6th	7th	8th	9th	10th	Pole	FL
Points	25	18	15	12	10	8	6	4	2	1	2	1

=== Drivers' Championship standings ===
Pos.	Driver	ALB (Australia)		MIA (United States)		MTL (Canada)		MON (Monaco)		CAT (Spain)		RBR (Austria)		SIL (United Kingdom)		SPA (Belgium)		HUN (Hungary)		MNZ (Italy)		MAD (Spain)		BAK (Azerbaijan)			LUS (Qatar)		YAS (United Arab Emirates)		Points
Pos.	Driver	SR	FR	SR	FR	SR	FR	SR	FR	SR	FR	SR	FR	SR	FR	SR	FR	SR	FR	SR	FR	SR	FR	SR	FR1	FR2	SR	FR	SR	FR	Points
1	(Brazil) Rafael Câmara	11	2	10	3^{F}	7	14	8	Ret^{P}	6	1^{P}	9^{F}	4	10	5^{P}	6	1^{P F}	4	3	Ret	2^{P F}	6	10	15	4	1					207
2	(Bulgaria) Nikola Tsolov	17	1	1	Ret	14	12	10^{F}	1^{F}	3	4	8	1	1	1	4	3	Ret	7	5	7	Ret	18	5	Ret	2^{F}					200
3	(Republic of Ireland) Alex Dunne	3	Ret	3	Ret	13	2	9	2	8	2	4	6	9	4	5	4	19	11	7	6	7	2^{F}	3^{F}	1^{P F}	3					189
4	(Italy) Gabriele Minì	6	8	7	1	2	3	3	11	2	3	5	2	2	6	Ret	5	1^{F}	9	10	11	9	7	14	6	9					163
5	(Sweden) Dino Beganovic	20	Ret^{P}	8	2	6	Ret	5	3	7	6	13	13	6^{F}	12	3	Ret	2	6	12	14	10	1^{P}	1	3	7					137
6	(Mexico) Noel León	2	14	9^{F}	4	1^{F}	10	1	9	4	8	10	7^{P}	12	7^{F}	Ret	DSQ	9	1	4	3	4	16	20†	5	8					133
7	(Norway) Martinius Stenshorne	10^{F}	Ret	6	Ret	3	1	6	5	18	17	14	19	20	DNS	2^{F}	10	8	21	6	15	5	8	4	2	4^{P}					107
8	(Paraguay) Joshua Dürksen	1	10	5	10	Ret	11	4	15	20	14	Ret	9	8	9	1	14	7	8	1^{F}	1	14	4	Ret	Ret	13					90
9	(India) Kush Maini	12	16	Ret	5^{P}	12	9	7	4	1^{F}	9	7	12	4	3	15	16	5	2^{P F}	20	17	Ret	Ret	8	10	12					90
10	(Netherlands) Laurens van Hoepen	7	3^{F}	2	11	4	Ret^{P}	19	12	19	5	15	8	14	17	10	Ret	3	4	8	12	3	12	2	Ret	5					90
11	(Thailand) Tasanapol Inthraphuvasak	4	6	Ret	15	WD	WD	NC	13	9	12	Ret	5	5	10	12	2	6	5	19	8	15	6	11	11	Ret					71
12	(Japan) Ritomo Miyata	5	5	12	6	11	16†	11	6	14	18	17	15	11	14	17	8	13	13	9	5	1^{F}	3	19†	Ret	Ret					70
13	(Mexico) Rafael Villagómez	13	11	Ret	Ret	Ret	Ret	16	21	17	11	3	Ret	3	2	16	6	15	Ret	17	19	13	14	13	8	Ret					42
14	(United Kingdom) John Bennett	15	18	13	14	Ret	Ret	20	18	13	7^{F}	1	11	Ret	11	Ret	15	10	10	2	4	Ret	Ret	10	Ret	Ret					38
15	(Germany) Oliver Goethe	18	4	11	Ret	10	15†	Ret	14	11	Ret	Ret	3^{F}	16	18	8	Ret	12	18	3	9	12	Ret	16	14	11					37
16	(Poland) Roman Bilinski	8	12	14	DNS	8	13	2	10	21	10	6	10	7	8	7	Ret	18	14	Ret	21	11	9	6	7	10					36
17	(Colombia) Sebastián Montoya	9	9	16	9	17†	4	13	8	10	16	2	Ret	Ret	Ret	9	11	Ret	16	14	18	17	13	7	DNS	17					30
18	(Brazil) Emerson Fittipaldi Jr.	14	15	Ret	12	5	Ret	17	7	16	19	Ret	14	17	20	14	Ret	20	17	16	20	2	5	18	12	16					28
19	(United States) Colton Herta	16	7	15	8	9	7	15	19	5	15	Ret	18	15	16	13	7	14	19	15	Ret	WD	WD	9	13	15					26
20	(Spain) Mari Boya	Ret	13	17	7	15	8	14	16	15	21	11	Ret	13	15	11	9	17	15	13	13	8	11	Ret	Ret	6					21
21	(Argentina) Nico Varrone	21	17	4	13	16	6^{F}	12	20	12	13	12	16	18	13	NC	13	11	12	11	10	Ret	15								15
22	(United Kingdom) Cian Shields	19	19	18	Ret	Ret	5	18	17	22	20	16	17	19	19	Ret	12	16	20	18	16	16	17	12	Ret	18					10
23	(Japan) Hiyu Yamakoshi																							17	9	14					2
Pos.	Driver	SR	FR	SR	FR	SR	FR	SR	FR	SR	FR	SR	FR	SR	FR	SR	FR	SR	FR	SR	FR	SR	FR	SR	FR1	FR2	SR	FR	SR	FR	Points
Pos.	Driver	ALB (Australia)		MIA (United States)		MTL (Canada)		MON (Monaco)		CAT (Spain)		RBR (Austria)		SIL (United Kingdom)		SPA (Belgium)		HUN (Hungary)		MNZ (Italy)		MAD (Spain)		BAK (Azerbaijan)			LUS (Qatar)		YAS (United Arab Emirates)		Points

Key
Colour	Result
Gold	Winner
Silver	Second place
Bronze	Third place
Green	Other points position
Blue	Other classified position
Blue	Not classified, finished (NC)
Purple	Not classified, retired (Ret)
Red	Did not qualify (DNQ)
Black	Disqualified (DSQ)
White	Did not start (DNS)
White	Race cancelled (C)
Blank	Did not practice (DNP)
Blank	Excluded (EX)
Blank	Did not arrive (DNA)
Blank	Withdrawn (WD)
Blank	Did not enter (empty cell)
Annotation	Meaning
P	Pole position
F	Fastest lap

† – Driver did not finish the race, but was classified as he completed more than 90% of the race distance.

=== Teams' Championship standings ===
Pos.	Team	ALB (Australia)		MIA (United States)		MTL (Canada)		MON (Monaco)		CAT (Spain)		RBR (Austria)		SIL (United Kingdom)		SPA (Belgium)		HUN (Hungary)		MNZ (Italy)		MAD (Spain)		BAK (Azerbaijan)			LUS (Qatar)		YAS (United Arab Emirates)		Points
Pos.	Team	SR	FR	SR	FR	SR	FR	SR	FR	SR	FR	SR	FR	SR	FR	SR	FR	SR	FR	SR	FR	SR	FR	SR	FR1	FR2	SR	FR	SR	FR	Points
1	(Spain) Campos Racing	2	1	1	4	1^{F}	10	1	1^{F}	3	4	8	1	1	1	4	3	9	1	4	3	4	16	5	5	2^{F}					333
1	(Spain) Campos Racing	17	14	9^{F}	Ret	14	12	10^{F}	9	4	8	10	7^{P}	12	7^{F}	Ret	DSQ	Ret	7	5	7	Ret	18	20†	Ret	8					333
2	(United Kingdom) Invicta Racing	1	2	5	3^{F}	7	11	4	15	6	1^{P}	9^{F}	4	8	5^{P}	1	1^{P F}	4	3	1^{F}	1	6	4	15	4	1					297
2	(United Kingdom) Invicta Racing	11	10	10	10	Ret	14	8	Ret^{P}	20	14	Ret	9	10	9	6	14	7	8	Ret	2^{P F}	14	10	Ret	Ret	13					297
3	(New Zealand) Rodin Motorsport	3	Ret	3	Ret	3	1	6	2	8	2	4	6	9	4	2^{F}	4	8	11	6	6	5	2^{F}	3^{F}	1^{P F}	3					296
3	(New Zealand) Rodin Motorsport	10^{F}	Ret	6	Ret	13	2	9	5	18	17	14	19	20	DNS	5	10	19	21	7	15	7	8	4	2	4^{P}					296
4	(Netherlands) MP Motorsport	6	4	7	1	2	3	3	11	2	3	5	2	2	6	8	5	1^{F}	9	3	9	9	7	14	6	9					200
4	(Netherlands) MP Motorsport	18	8	11	Ret	10	15†	Ret	14	11	Ret	Ret	3^{F}	16	18	Ret	Ret	12	18	10	11	12	Ret	16	14	11					200
5	(France) DAMS Lucas Oil	8	12	8	2	6	13	2	3	7	6	6	10	6^{F}	8	3	Ret	2	6	12	14	10	1^{P}	1	3	7					173
5	(France) DAMS Lucas Oil	20	Ret^{P}	14	DNS	8	Ret	5	10	21	10	13	13	7	12	7	Ret	18	14	Ret	21	11	9	6	7	10					173
6	(France) ART Grand Prix	4	6	Ret	5^{P}	12	9	7	4	1^{F}	9	7	5	4	3	12	2	5	2^{P F}	19	8	15	6	8	10	12					161
6	(France) ART Grand Prix	12	16	Ret	15	WD	WD	NC	13	9	12	Ret	12	5	10	15	16	6	5	20	17	Ret	Ret	11	11	Ret					161
7	(Italy) Trident	7	3^{F}	2	11	4	Ret^{P}	19	12	13	5	1	8	14	11	10	15	3	4	2	4	3	12	2	Ret	5					128
7	(Italy) Trident	15	18	13	14	Ret	Ret	20	18	19	7^{F}	15	11	Ret	17	Ret	Ret	10	10	8	12	Ret	Ret	10	Ret	Ret					128
8	(United Kingdom) Hitech	5	5	12	6	9	7	11	6	5	15	17	15	11	14	13	7	13	13	9	5	1^{F}	3	9	13	15					96
8	(United Kingdom) Hitech	16	7	15	8	11	16†	15	19	14	18	Ret	18	15	16	17	8	14	19	15	Ret	WD	WD	19†	Ret	Ret					96
9	(Netherlands) Van Amersfoort Racing	13	11	4	13	16	6^{F}	12	20	12	11	3	16	3	2	16	6	11	12	11	10	13	14	13	8	14					59
9	(Netherlands) Van Amersfoort Racing	21	17	Ret	Ret	Ret	Ret	16	21	17	13	12	Ret	18	13	NC	13	15	Ret	17	19	Ret	15	17	9	Ret					59
10	(Italy) Prema Racing	9	9	16	7	15	4	13	8	10	16	2	Ret	13	15	9	9	17	15	13	13	8	11	7	Ret	6					51
10	(Italy) Prema Racing	Ret	13	17	9	17†	8	14	16	15	21	11	Ret	Ret	Ret	11	11	Ret	16	14	18	17	13	Ret	DNS	17					51
11	(United Arab Emirates) AIX Racing	14	15	18	12	5	5	17	7	16	19	16	14	17	19	14	12	16	17	16	16	2	5	12	12	16					38
11	(United Arab Emirates) AIX Racing	19	19	Ret	Ret	Ret	Ret	18	17	22	20	Ret	17	19	20	Ret	Ret	20	20	18	20	16	17	18	Ret	18					38
Pos.	Team	SR	FR	SR	FR	SR	FR	SR	FR	SR	FR	SR	FR	SR	FR	SR	FR	SR	FR	SR	FR	SR	FR	SR	FR1	FR2	SR	FR	SR	FR	Points
Pos.	Team	ALB (Australia)		MIA (United States)		MTL (Canada)		MON (Monaco)		CAT (Spain)		RBR (Austria)		SIL (United Kingdom)		SPA (Belgium)		HUN (Hungary)		MNZ (Italy)		MAD (Spain)		BAK (Azerbaijan)			LUS (Qatar)		YAS (United Arab Emirates)		Points

Key
Colour	Result
Gold	Winner
Silver	Second place
Bronze	Third place
Green	Other points position
Blue	Other classified position
Blue	Not classified, finished (NC)
Purple	Not classified, retired (Ret)
Red	Did not qualify (DNQ)
Black	Disqualified (DSQ)
White	Did not start (DNS)
White	Race cancelled (C)
Blank	Did not practice (DNP)
Blank	Excluded (EX)
Blank	Did not arrive (DNA)
Blank	Withdrawn (WD)
Blank	Did not enter (empty cell)
Annotation	Meaning
P	Pole position
F	Fastest lap

† – Driver did not finish the race, but was classified as he completed more than 90% of the race distance.

The standings are sorted by best result; the rows are not related to the drivers. In case of a tie on points, the best positions achieved determined the outcome.
