= John Bennett (racing driver) =

British-Irish racing driver (born 2003)

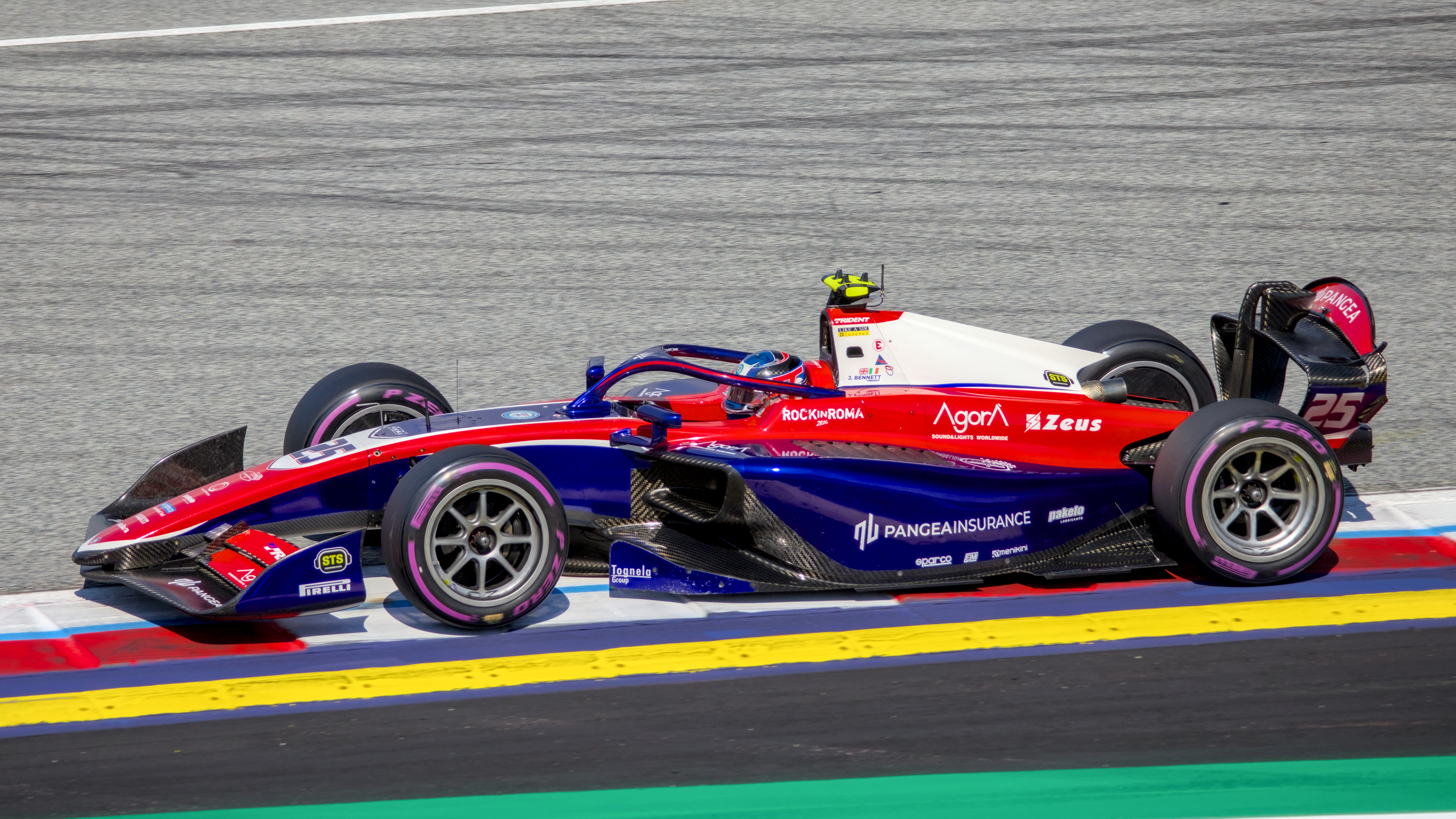
- Bennett driving the Dallara F2 2024 during the 2026 Spielberg Formula 2 round
- Nationality: (United Kingdom) British (Republic of Ireland) Irish via dual nationality
- Born: John Andrew Bennett; 15 September 2003 (age 23) Salisbury, Wiltshire, England

FIA Formula 2 Championship career
- Debut season: 2024
- Current team: Trident
- Car number: 25
- Former teams: Van Amersfoort Racing
- Starts: 49
- Wins: 1
- Podiums: 2
- Poles: 0
- Fastest laps: 1
- Best finish: 22nd in 2025

Previous series
- 2024; 2024; 2022–2024; 2020–2021: FR European; FR Middle East; GB3; Ginetta GT5 Challenge
- Statistics up to date as of 25 August 2026.

John Andrew Bennett (born 15 September 2003) is a British-Irish racing driver who currently competes in the FIA Formula 2 Championship for Trident, having last raced for Van Amersfoort Racing.

Bennett is the runner-up of the 2021 Ginetta GT5 Challenge and the 2024 GB3 Championship for JHR Developments, and is a Formula 2 race winner.

== Career ==
=== Ginetta GT5 ===
Bennett made his racing debut for Elite Motorsport in the 2020 Ginetta GT5 Challenge where he collected three podiums and a fastest lap in his maiden campaign. In 2021, he came runner-up in the championship with five wins, two pole positions and ten podiums.

=== GB3 Championship ===
==== 2022 ====
Bennett made his debut in single-seater machinery in the 2022 GB3 Championship driving for Elite Motorsport. His maiden season went well as he remained consistent throughout the season, including getting his first single-seater podium at the final round in Donington Park. He finished eighth in the championship standings with 262.5 points.

==== 2023 ====
Bennett signed up with multi-championship winning team Rodin Carlin for 2023, where he stated that his goal was to "fight for the championship." He had a difficult campaign, only mustering two pole positions and one podium at the second round at Silverstone Circuit. Bennett ended the season tenth in the championship standings with 217 points to his name.

==== 2024 ====
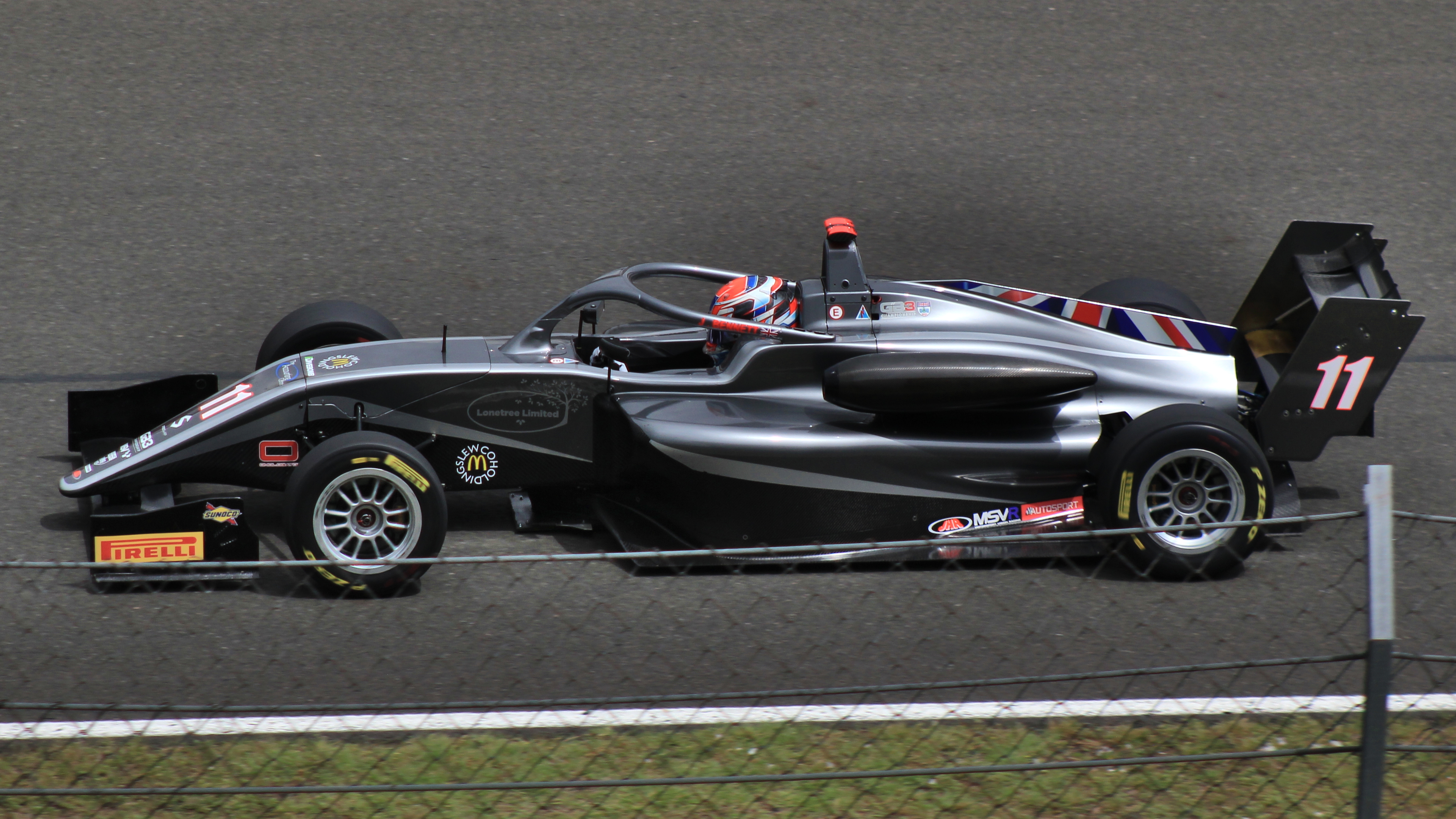
Bennett driving at the Hungaroring during the 2024 GB3 Championship

For his third season in the GB3 Championship, Bennett drove for JHR Developments. He scored his maiden GB3 race win on the opening weekend at Oulton Park, before adding further victories at Zandvoort and Silverstone. He took the title fight down to the final weekend, finishing as overall vice-champion with 11 podium finishes to his name.

=== Formula Regional ===
==== Formula Regional Middle East Championship ====
Bennett made his Formula Regional debut in the 2024 Formula Regional Middle East Championship for Evans GP, partnering Australian Costa Toparis and Frenchman Edgar Pierre. He scored a lone point in the final race of the series at the Dubai Autodrome and finished 23rd in the championship standings.

==== Formula Regional European Championship ====
Bennett made his Formula Regional European Championship debut for Finnish outfit KIC Motorsport at the third round of the 2024 Formula Regional European Championship at Circuit Zandvoort, replacing his Formula Regional Middle East teammate, Costa Toparis. He came 16th in his debut race, but retired from the second race after he came to a halt on track after lap two.

=== FIA Formula 3 Championship ===
In October 2024, Bennett partook in the FIA Formula 3 post-season tests with Van Amersfoort Racing.

=== FIA Formula 2 Championship ===
==== 2024 ====
Bennett stepped up to Formula 2 for the final two rounds of the 2024 season with Van Amersfoort Racing, replacing Enzo Fittipaldi.

At the start of the Lusail feature race, Bennett stalled his car, leading him falling a lap behind the rest of the field. Bennett was able to unlap himself during a safety car intervention, and began retaking places. He was then able to take eighth in the race, scoring points on his feature race debut.

==== 2025 ====
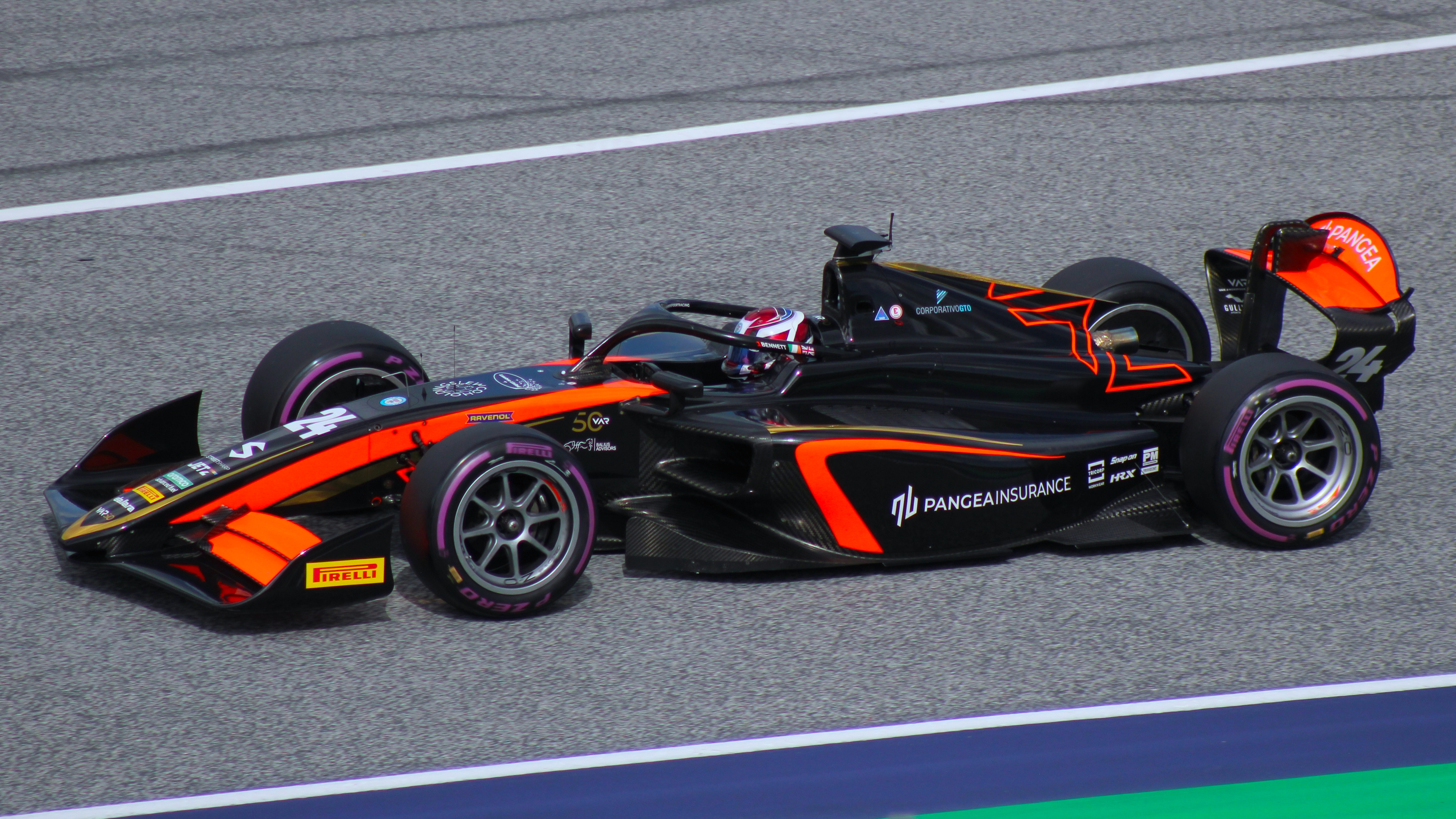
Bennett driving for Van Amersfoort Racing during the 2025 Spielberg Formula 2 round

In 2025, Bennett remained with Van Amersfoort Racing for the full 2025 season, becoming the first driver to directly step up to F2 from GB3. He secured his second points finish in the championship in the Monza feature race and finished 22nd in the final standings.

==== 2026 ====
Bennett switched to Trident for the 2026 season, partnering Laurens van Hoepen. He claimed his maiden FIA Formula 2 win in the sprint race at Austria.

== Racing record ==
=== Racing career summary ===
Season	Series	Team	Races	Wins	Poles	F/Laps	Podiums	Points	Position
2020	Ginetta GT5 Challenge	Elite Motorsport	14	0	0	1	3	191	7th
2021	Ginetta GT5 Challenge	Elite Motorsport	18	5	2	4	10	411	**2nd**
2022	GB3 Championship	Elite Motorsport	24	0	0	0	1	262.5	8th
2023	GB3 Championship	Rodin Carlin	23	0	2	0	1	217	10th
2024	Formula Regional Middle East Championship	Evans GP	14	0	0	0	0	1	23rd
2024	GB3 Championship	JHR Developments	23	3	3	5	11	456	**2nd**
2024	Formula Regional European Championship	KIC Motorsport	2	0	0	0	0	0	30th
2024	FIA Formula 2 Championship	Van Amersfoort Racing	4	0	0	0	0	4	28th
2025	FIA Formula 2 Championship	Van Amersfoort Racing	27	0	0	0	0	1	22nd
2026	FIA Formula 2 Championship	Trident	11	1	0	1	1	17	14th*

* Season still in progress.

=== Complete GB3 Championship results ===
(key) (Races in bold indicate pole position) (Races in italics indicate fastest lap)

Year	Team	1	2	3	4	5	6	7	8	9	10	11	12	13	14	15	16	17	18	19	20	21	22	23	24	DC	Points
2022	Elite Motorsport	OUL; 1; 5	OUL; 2; 5	OUL; 3; 9^{2}	SIL1; 1; 6	SIL1; 2; 9	SIL1; 3; 11^{2}	DON1; 1; 17	DON1; 2; 13	DON1; 3; 4^{3}	SNE; 1; 6	SNE; 2; 11	SNE; 3; 16	SPA; 1; 17	SPA; 2; 5	SPA; 3; 11	SIL2; 1; 5	SIL2; 2; 8	SIL2; 3 Ret	BRH; 1; 4	BRH; 2; 6	BRH; 3; 14	DON2; 1; 3	DON2; 2 Ret	DON2; 3; 16^{1}	8th	262.5
2023	Rodin Carlin	OUL; 1; 19	OUL; 2; 9	OUL; 3 Ret	**SIL1**; **1**; 2	**SIL1**; **2**; 4	SIL1; 3; 11^{8}	SPA; 1; 15	SPA; 2; 12	SPA; 3; 9^{5}	SNE; 1; 10	SNE; 2; 11	SNE; 3; 20	SIL2; 1; 18	SIL2; 2; 14	SIL2; 3 C	BRH; 1; 7	BRH; 2; 16	BRH; 3; 10^{8}	ZAN; 1; 10	ZAN; 2; 14	ZAN; 3; 7^{5}	DON; 1; 11	DON; 2; 15	DON; 3; 18	10th	217
2024	JHR Developments	OUL; 1; 2	OUL; 2; 1	OUL; 3; 14	SIL1; 1; 10	SIL1; 2; 8	SIL1; 3 C	SPA; 1; 2	**SPA**; **2**; 2	SPA; 3 Ret	HUN; 1; 3	HUN; 2; 6	HUN; 3; 7^{3}	**ZAN**; **1**; 1	**ZAN**; **2**; 15	ZAN; 3; 10^{7}	SIL2; 1; 1	SIL2; 2; 3	SIL2; 3; 4^{5}	DON; 1; 3	DON; 2; 7	DON; 3; 4^{5}	BRH; 1; 2	BRH; 2; 2	BRH; 3; 9^{2}	2nd	456

=== Complete Formula Regional Middle East Championship results ===
(key) (Races in bold indicate pole position) (Races in italics indicate fastest lap)

Year	Entrant	1	2	3	4	5	6	7	8	9	10	11	12	13	14	15	DC	Points
2024	Evans GP	YMC1; 1; 12	YMC1; 2; 13	YMC1; 3; 19	YMC2; 1 DNS	YMC2; 2; 13	YMC2; 3; 22	DUB1; 1; 18	DUB1; 2; 24†	DUB1; 3; 19	YMC3; 1; 20	YMC3; 2; 16	YMC3; 3 Ret	DUB2; 1; 18	DUB2; 2; 15	DUB2; 3; 10	23rd	1

=== Complete Formula Regional European Championship results ===
(key) (Races in bold indicate pole position) (Races in italics indicate fastest lap)

Year	Team	1	2	3	4	5	6	7	8	9	10	11	12	13	14	15	16	17	18	19	20	DC	Points
2024	KIC Motorsport	HOC; 1	HOC; 2	SPA; 1	SPA; 2	ZAN; 1; 16	ZAN; 2 Ret	HUN; 1	HUN; 2	MUG; 1	MUG; 2	LEC; 1	LEC; 2	IMO; 1	IMO; 2	RBR; 1	RBR; 2	CAT; 1	CAT; 2	MNZ; 1	MNZ; 2	30th	0

=== Complete FIA Formula 2 Championship results ===
(key) (Races in bold indicate pole position) (Races in italics indicate fastest lap)

Year	Entrant	1	2	3	4	5	6	7	8	9	10	11	12	13	14	15	16	17	18	19	20	21	22	23	24	25	26	27	28	29	DC	Points
2024	Van Amersfoort Racing	BHR; SPR	BHR; FEA	JED; SPR	JED; FEA	MEL; SPR	MEL; FEA	IMO; SPR	IMO; FEA	MON; SPR	MON; FEA	CAT; SPR	CAT; FEA	RBR; SPR	RBR; FEA	SIL; SPR	SIL; FEA	HUN; SPR	HUN; FEA	SPA; SPR	SPA; FEA	MNZ; SPR	MNZ; FEA	BAK; SPR	BAK; FEA	LSL; SPR; 12	LSL; FEA; 8	YMC; SPR; 15	YMC; FEA; 14		28th	4
2025	Van Amersfoort Racing	MEL; SPR; 18	MEL; FEA; C	BHR; SPR; 17	BHR; FEA; 20	JED; SPR; 20	JED; FEA; 20	IMO; SPR; 19	IMO; FEA; 20	MON; SPR; Ret	MON; FEA; 11	CAT; SPR; Ret	CAT; FEA; 18	RBR; SPR; 15†	RBR; FEA; 14	SIL; SPR; 15	SIL; FEA; 12	SPA; SPR; 9	SPA; FEA; 12	HUN; SPR; 20	HUN; FEA; Ret	MNZ; SPR; 14	MNZ; FEA; 10	BAK; SPR; 13	BAK; FEA; 14	LSL; SPR; 15	LSL; FEA; 17	YMC; SPR; Ret	YMC; FEA; 16		22nd	1
2026	Trident	MEL; SPR; 15	MEL; FEA; 18	MIA; SPR; 13	MIA; FEA; 14	MTL; SPR; Ret	MTL; FEA; Ret	MON; SPR; 20	MON; FEA; 18	CAT; SPR; 13	CAT; FEA; 7	RBR; SPR; 1	RBR; FEA; 11	SIL; SPR; Ret	SIL; FEA; 11	SPA; SPR; Ret	SPA; FEA; 15	HUN; SPR; 10	HUN; FEA; 10	MNZ; SPR; 2	MNZ; FEA; 4	MAD; SPR; Ret	MAD; FEA; Ret	BAK; SPR; 10	BAK; FEA1; Ret	BAK; FEA2; Ret	LSL; SPR	LSL; FEA	YMC; SPR	YMC; FEA	14th*	38*

* Season still in progress.
