= 2026 Melbourne Formula 2 round =

Motor racing event

(Australia) 2026 Melbourne Formula 2 round
Round details
- Round 1 of 14 in the 2026 FIA Formula 2 Championship.
- Location: Albert Park Circuit; Melbourne, Victoria, Australia
- Course: Temporary street circuit 5.278 km (3.280 mi)

Sprint Race
- Date: 7 March 2026
- Laps: 23
Podium
First	(Paraguay) Joshua Dürksen	Invicta Racing
Second	(Mexico) Noel León	Campos Racing
Third	(Republic of Ireland) Alex Dunne	Rodin Motorsport
Fastest lap
Driver	(Norway) Martinius Stenshorne	Rodin Motorsport
- Time: 1:32.045 (on lap 23)

Feature Race
- Date: 8 March 2026
- Laps: 33
Pole position
Driver	(Sweden) Dino Beganovic	DAMS Lucas Oil
Time	1:28.695	
Podium
First	(Bulgaria) Nikola Tsolov	Campos Racing
Second	(Brazil) Rafael Câmara	Invicta Racing
Third	(Netherlands) Laurens van Hoepen	Trident
Fastest lap
Driver	(Sweden) Dino Beganovic (Note: Dino Beganovic set the fastest lap but did not finish in the top ten, so he was ineligible to score the point for it. Laurens van Hoepen scored the point for setting the fastest lap among those finishing in the top ten.)	DAMS Lucas Oil
- Time: 1:31.730 (on lap 13)

The 2026 Melbourne FIA Formula 2 round was a motor racing event held between 6 and 8 March 2026 at the Albert Park Circuit. It served as the opening round of the 2026 FIA Formula 2 Championship and was held in support of the 2026 Australian Grand Prix.

== Report ==
=== Practice ===
Gabriele Minì of MP Motorsport set the fastest lap of the free practice session on Friday. Two red flags were issued during practice; Hitech's Colton Herta crashed midway through his first session at a Formula One Grand Prix weekend, and an off-track excursion by Formula 2 debutant Tasanapol Inthraphuvasak eventually ended the session prematurely.

== Classification ==
=== Qualifying ===
Qualifying was held on 6 March 2026, at 14:55 local time (UTC+11).

Pos.	No.	Driver	Entrant	Time/Gap	Grid SR	Grid FR
1	7	(Sweden) Dino Beganovic	DAMS Lucas Oil	1:28.695	10	1
2	14	(Norway) Martinius Stenshorne	Rodin Motorsport	+0.216	9	2
3	15	(Republic of Ireland) Alex Dunne	Rodin Motorsport	+0.344	8	3
4	5	(Mexico) Noel León	Campos Racing	+0.381	7	4
5	6	(Bulgaria) Nikola Tsolov	Campos Racing	+0.428	6	5
6	1	(Brazil) Rafael Câmara	Invicta Racing	+0.448	5	6
7	16	(India) Kush Maini	ART Grand Prix	+0.464	4	7
8	10	(Germany) Oliver Goethe	MP Motorsport	+0.559	3	8
9	2	(Paraguay) Joshua Dürksen	Invicta Racing	+0.789	2	9
10	17	(Thailand) Tasanapol Inthraphuvasak	ART Grand Prix	+0.846	1	10
11	24	(Netherlands) Laurens van Hoepen	Trident	+0.869	11	11
12	8	(Poland) Roman Bilinski	DAMS Lucas Oil	+0.910	12	12
13	3	(Japan) Ritomo Miyata	Hitech TGR	+0.945	13	13
14	4	(United States) Colton Herta	Hitech TGR	+1.070	14	14
15	11	(Colombia) Sebastián Montoya	Prema Racing	+1.129	15	15
16	23	(Mexico) Rafael Villagómez	Van Amersfoort Racing	+1.367	16	16
17	25	(United Kingdom) John Bennett	Trident	+1.544	17	17
18	20	(Brazil) Emerson Fittipaldi Jr.	AIX Racing	+1.795	18	18
19	22	(Argentina) Nicolás Varrone	Van Amersfoort Racing	+1.827	19	19
20	21	(United Kingdom) Cian Shields	AIX Racing	+2.048	20	20
21	9	(Italy) Gabriele Minì	MP Motorsport	+2.438	21	21
107% time: 1:34.903 (+6.208)
—	12	(Spain) Mari Boya	Prema Racing	+34.198	22^{1}	22^{1}

Notes:

- ^1 – Mari Boya failed to set a time within the 107%-mark after crashing during qualifying. He was given permission from the stewards to start both races at the back of the grid.

=== Sprint race ===
The sprint race was held on 7 March 2026, at 14:10 local time (UTC+11).

Pos.	No.	Driver	Entrant	Laps	Time/Retired	Grid	Points
1	2	(Paraguay) Joshua Dürksen	Invicta Racing	23	39:09.726	2	10
2	5	(Mexico) Noel León	Campos Racing	23	+2.139	7	8
3	15	(Republic of Ireland) Alex Dunne	Rodin Motorsport	23	+5.746	8	6
4	17	(Thailand) Tasanapol Inthraphuvasak	ART Grand Prix	23	+7.156	1	5
5	3	(Japan) Ritomo Miyata	Hitech	23	+7.266	13	4
6	9	(Italy) Gabriele Minì	MP Motorsport	23	+7.734	21	3
7	24	(Netherlands) Laurens van Hoepen	Trident	23	+8.477	11	2
8	8	(Poland) Roman Bilinski	DAMS Lucas Oil	23	+8.559	12	1
9	11	(Colombia) Sebastián Montoya	Prema Racing	23	+8.982	15	
10	14	(Norway) Martinius Stenshorne	Rodin Motorsport	23	+9.519^{1}	9	1
11	1	(Brazil) Rafael Câmara	Invicta Racing	23	+9.548	5	
12	16	(India) Kush Maini	ART Grand Prix	23	+9.938	4	
13	23	(Mexico) Rafael Villagómez	Van Amersfoort Racing	23	+10.331	16	
14	20	(Brazil) Emerson Fittipaldi Jr.	AIX Racing	23	+12.078	18	
15	25	(United Kingdom) John Bennett	Trident	23	+12.569	17	
16	4	(United States) Colton Herta	Hitech	23	+13.201	14	
17	6	(Bulgaria) Nikola Tsolov	Campos Racing	23	+13.904	6	
18	10	(Germany) Oliver Goethe	MP Motorsport	23	+14.489	3	
19	21	(United Kingdom) Cian Shields	AIX Racing	23	+15.438	20	
20	7	(Sweden) Dino Beganovic	DAMS Lucas Oil	23	+15.965	10	
21	22	(Argentina) Nico Varrone	Van Amersfoort Racing	23	+18.230	19	
DNF	12	(Spain) Mari Boya	Prema Racing	13	Accident	22	
Fastest lap: (Norway) Martinius Stenshorne (1:32.045 on lap 23)

Notes:

- ^1 – Martinius Stenshorne received a five-second time penalty for leaving the track and gaining an advantage over Nikola Tsolov.

=== Feature race ===
The feature race was held on 8 March 2026, at 11:25 local time (UTC+11), and was contested over 33 laps.

Pos.	No.	Driver	Entrant	Laps	Time/Retired	Grid	Points
1	6	(Bulgaria) Nikola Tsolov	Campos Racing	33	56:05.248	5	25
2	1	(Brazil) Rafael Câmara	Invicta Racing	33	+1.669	6	18
3	24	(Netherlands) Laurens van Hoepen	Trident	33	+3.517	11	15+1
4	10	(Germany) Oliver Goethe	MP Motorsport	33	+4.816	8	12
5	3	(Japan) Ritomo Miyata	Hitech	33	+5.684	13	10
6	17	(Thailand) Tasanapol Inthraphuvasak	ART Grand Prix	33	+12.179	10	8
7	4	(United States) Colton Herta	Hitech	33	+17.411	14	6
8	9	(Italy) Gabriele Minì	MP Motorsport	33	+18.707	21	4
9	11	(Colombia) Sebastián Montoya	Prema Racing	33	+19.443^{1}	15	2
10	2	(Paraguay) Joshua Dürksen	Invicta Racing	33	+21.800^{2}	9	1
11	23	(Mexico) Rafael Villagómez	Van Amersfoort Racing	33	+22.231	16	
12	8	(Poland) Roman Bilinski	DAMS Lucas Oil	33	+22.316	12	
13	12	(Spain) Mari Boya	Prema Racing	33	+23.813	22	
14	5	(Mexico) Noel León	Campos Racing	33	+24.002	4	
15	20	(Brazil) Emerson Fittipaldi Jr.	AIX Racing	33	+24.384	18	
16	16	(India) Kush Maini	ART Grand Prix	33	+25.079	7	
17	22	(Argentina) Nico Varrone	Van Amersfoort Racing	33	+27.063^{1}	19	
18	25	(United Kingdom) John Bennett	Trident	33	+28.397	17	
19	21	(United Kingdom) Cian Shields	AIX Racing	33	+48.999^{3}	20	
DNF	7	(Sweden) Dino Beganovic	DAMS Lucas Oil	15	Mechanical	1	2
DNF	14	(Norway) Martinius Stenshorne	Rodin Motorsport	2	Collision	2	
DNF	15	(Republic of Ireland) Alex Dunne	Rodin Motorsport	2	Collision	3	
Fastest lap: (Sweden) Dino Beganovic (1:31.730 on lap 13)^{4}

Notes:

- ^1 – Sebastián Montoya and Nico Varrone both received a five-second time penalty for speeding in the pit lane.
- ^2 – Joshua Dürksen was handed a five-second time penalty for a false start.
- ^3 – Cian Shields was given a five-second time penalty for exceeding track limits.
- ^4 – Dino Beganovic set the fastest lap but did not finish in the top ten, so he was ineligible to score the point for it. Laurens van Hoepen scored the point for setting the fastest lap among those finishing in the top ten.

== Standings after the event ==
Drivers' Championship standings

Pos.	Driver	Points
1	(Bulgaria) Nikola Tsolov	25
2	(Brazil) Rafael Câmara	18
3	(Netherlands) Laurens van Hoepen	18
4	(Japan) Ritomo Miyata	14
5	(Thailand) Tasanapol Inthraphuvasak	13

Teams' Championship standings

Pos.	Team	Points
1	(Spain) Campos Racing	33
2	(United Kingdom) Invicta Racing	29
3	(United Kingdom) Hitech	20
4	(Netherlands) MP Motorsport	19
5	(Italy) Trident	18

Note: Only the top five positions are included for both sets of standings.

== See also ==
- 2026 Australian Grand Prix
- 2026 Melbourne Formula 3 round

== Notes ==
Previous round: 2025 Yas Island Formula 2 round	FIA Formula 2 Championship; 2026 season	Next round: 2026 Miami Formula 2 round
Previous round: 2025 Melbourne Formula 2 round	Melbourne Formula 2 round	Next round: 2027 Melbourne Formula 2 round
