= 2026 Miami Formula 2 round =

Motor racing event

(United States) 2026 Miami Formula 2 round
Round details
- Round 2 of 14 in the 2026 FIA Formula 2 Championship.
- Location: Miami International Autodrome; Miami Gardens, Florida, US
- Course: Purpose-built temporary circuit 5.412 km (3.363 mi)

Sprint Race
- Date: 2 May 2026
- Laps: 23
Podium
First	(Bulgaria) Nikola Tsolov	Campos Racing
Second	(Netherlands) Laurens van Hoepen	Trident
Third	(Republic of Ireland) Alex Dunne	Rodin Motorsport
Fastest lap
Driver	(Mexico) Noel León	Campos Racing
- Time: 1:41.932 (on lap 11)

Feature Race
- Date: 3 May 2026
- Laps: 25
Pole position
Driver	(India) Kush Maini	ART Grand Prix
Time	1:39.888	
Podium
First	(Italy) Gabriele Minì	MP Motorsport
Second	(Sweden) Dino Beganovic	DAMS Lucas Oil
Third	(Brazil) Rafael Câmara	Invicta Racing
Fastest lap
Driver	(Brazil) Rafael Câmara	Invicta Racing
- Time: 1:55.796 (on lap 22)

The 2026 Miami FIA Formula 2 round was a motor racing event held between 1 and 3 May 2026 at the Miami International Autodrome. It was the second round of the 2026 FIA Formula 2 Championship and was held in support of the 2026 Miami Grand Prix. It was the first time the championship raced in North America following the cancellations of both the Bahrain and Saudi Arabian rounds as a result of the 2026 Iran war.

== Classification ==
=== Qualifying ===
Qualifying was held on 1 May 2026, at 14:30 local time (UTC−4).

Pos.	No.	Driver	Entrant	Time/Gap	Grid SR	Grid FR
1	16	(India) Kush Maini	ART Grand Prix	1:39.888	10	1
2	1	(Brazil) Rafael Câmara	Invicta Racing	+0.033	9	2
3	14	(Norway) Martinius Stenshorne	Rodin Motorsport	+0.050	8	3
4	15	(Republic of Ireland) Alex Dunne	Rodin Motorsport	+0.169	7	9^{1}
5	9	(Italy) Gabriele Minì	MP Motorsport	+0.223	6	4
6	22	(Argentina) Nico Varrone	Van Amersfoort Racing	+0.316	5	5
7	2	(Paraguay) Joshua Dürksen	Invicta Racing	+0.320	4	6
8	10	(Germany) Oliver Goethe	MP Motorsport	+0.328	3	7
9	24	(Netherlands) Laurens van Hoepen	Trident	+0.335	2	8
10	6	(Bulgaria) Nikola Tsolov	Campos Racing	+0.377	1	10
11	7	(Sweden) Dino Beganovic	DAMS Lucas Oil	+0.519	11	11
12	17	(Thailand) Tasanapol Inthraphuvasak	ART Grand Prix	+0.568	12	12
13	5	(Mexico) Noel León	Campos Racing	+0.573	13	13
14	4	(United States) Colton Herta	Hitech	+0.585	14	14
15	25	(United Kingdom) John Bennett	Trident	+0.664	15	15
16	12	(Spain) Mari Boya	Prema Racing	+0.666	16	16
17	3	(Japan) Ritomo Miyata	Hitech	+0.724	17	17
18	20	(Brazil) Emerson Fittipaldi Jr.	AIX Racing	+0.746	18	18
19	23	(Mexico) Rafael Villagómez	Van Amersfoort Racing	+0.786	22^{2}	22^{2}
20	11	(Colombia) Sebastián Montoya	Prema Racing	+0.790	19	19
21	8	(Poland) Roman Bilinski	DAMS Lucas Oil	+0.910	20	20
22	21	(United Kingdom) Cian Shields	AIX Racing	+1.269	21	21

Notes:

- ^1 – Alex Dunne received a five-place grid penalty after causing a collision with Martinius Stenshorne during the Melbourne feature race. The penalty relegated Dunne from 4th to 9th on the feature race grid.
- ^2 – Rafael Villagómez received a ten-place grid penalty for failing to reduce speed under single and double yellow flags. The penalty dropped Villagómez from 19th to 22nd on the grid for both races.

=== Sprint race ===
The sprint race was held on 2 May 2026, at 10:00 local time (UTC−4).

Pos.	No.	Driver	Entrant	Laps	Time/Retired	Grid	Points
1	6	(Bulgaria) Nikola Tsolov	Campos Racing	23	39:26.273	1	10
2	24	(Netherlands) Laurens van Hoepen	Trident	23	+0.170	2	8
3	15	(Republic of Ireland) Alex Dunne	Rodin Motorsport	23	+1.281	7	6
4	22	(Argentina) Nico Varrone	Van Amersfoort Racing	23	+4.538	5	5
5	2	(Paraguay) Joshua Dürksen	Invicta Racing	23	+5.212	4	4
6	14	(Norway) Martinius Stenshorne	Rodin Motorsport	23	+5.627	8	3
7	9	(Italy) Gabriele Minì	MP Motorsport	23	+5.770	6	2
8	7	(Sweden) Dino Beganovic	DAMS Lucas Oil	23	+6.754	11	1
9	5	(Mexico) Noel León	Campos Racing	23	+8.522	13	0+1
10	1	(Brazil) Rafael Câmara	Invicta Racing	23	+8.813	9	
11	10	(Germany) Oliver Goethe	MP Motorsport	23	+13.184	3	
12	3	(Japan) Ritomo Miyata	Hitech	23	+19.125	17	
13	25	(United Kingdom) John Bennett	Trident	23	+19.686	15	
14	8	(Poland) Roman Bilinski	DAMS Lucas Oil	23	+22.919	20	
15	4	(United States) Colton Herta	Hitech	23	+27.172	14	
16	11	(Colombia) Sebastián Montoya	Prema Racing	23	+28.637	19	
17	12	(Spain) Mari Boya	Prema Racing	23	+30.644	16	
18	21	(United Kingdom) Cian Shields	AIX Racing	23	+48.439	21	
DNF	20	(Brazil) Emerson Fittipaldi Jr.	AIX Racing	16		18	
DNF	16	(India) Kush Maini	ART Grand Prix	13	Retired	10	
DNF	23	(Mexico) Rafael Villagómez	Van Amersfoort Racing	9		22	
DNF	17	(Thailand) Tasanapol Inthraphuvasak	ART Grand Prix	9		12	
Fastest lap: (Mexico) Noel León (1:41.932 on lap 11)

=== Feature race ===
The feature race was held on 3 May 2026, at 09:25 local time (UTC−4).

Pos.	No.	Driver	Entrant	Laps	Time/Retired	Grid	Points
1	9	(Italy) Gabriele Minì	MP Motorsport	25	56:22.029	4	25
2	7	(Sweden) Dino Beganovic	DAMS Lucas Oil	25	+0.980	11	18
3	1	(Brazil) Rafael Câmara	Invicta Racing	25	+2.040	2	15+1
4	5	(Mexico) Noel León	Campos Racing	25	+2.400	13	12
5	16	(India) Kush Maini	ART Grand Prix	25	+3.855	1	10
6	3	(Japan) Ritomo Miyata	Hitech	25	+4.447	17	8
7	12	(Spain) Mari Boya	Prema Racing	25	+7.923	16	6
8	4	(United States) Colton Herta	Hitech	25	+10.969	14	4
9	11	(Colombia) Sebastián Montoya	Prema Racing	25	+11.381	19	2
10	2	(Paraguay) Joshua Dürksen	Invicta Racing	25	+12.335	6	1
11	24	(Netherlands) Laurens van Hoepen	Trident	25	+12.606	8	
12	20	(Brazil) Emerson Fittipaldi Jr.	AIX Racing	25	+14.300	18	
13	22	(Argentina) Nico Varrone	Van Amersfoort Racing	25	+24.800^{1}	5	
14	25	(United Kingdom) John Bennett	Trident	25	+27.888	15	
15	17	(Thailand) Tasanapol Inthraphuvasak	ART Grand Prix	25	+42.736^{1}	12	
DNF	21	(United Kingdom) Cian Shields	AIX Racing	17	Accident	21	
DNF	14	(Norway) Martinius Stenshorne	Rodin Motorsport	13	Collision	3	
DNF	23	(Mexico) Rafael Villagómez	Van Amersfoort Racing	9	Retired	22	
DNF	15	(Republic of Ireland) Alex Dunne	Rodin Motorsport	8	Accident	9	
DNF	10	(Germany) Oliver Goethe	MP Motorsport	3	Accident	7	
DNF	6	(Bulgaria) Nikola Tsolov	Campos Racing	0	Collision	10	
DNS	8	(Poland) Roman Bilinski	DAMS Lucas Oil	0		20	
Fastest lap: (Brazil) Rafael Câmara (1:55.796 on lap 22)

Notes:

- ^1 – Nico Varrone and Tasanapol Inthraphuvasak both received a ten-second time penalty for causing a collision.

== Standings after the event ==
Drivers' Championship standings

	Pos.	Driver	Points
	1	(Bulgaria) Nikola Tsolov	35
7	2	(Italy) Gabriele Minì	34
1	3	(Brazil) Rafael Câmara	34
1	4	(Netherlands) Laurens van Hoepen	26
1	5	(Japan) Ritomo Miyata	22

Teams' Championship standings

	Pos.	Team	Points
	1	(Spain) Campos Racing	56
	2	(United Kingdom) Invicta Racing	50
1	3	(Netherlands) MP Motorsport	46
1	4	(United Kingdom) Hitech	32
	5	(Italy) Trident	26

Note: Only the top five positions are included for both sets of standings.

== See also ==
- 2026 Miami Grand Prix

Previous round: 2026 Melbourne Formula 2 round	FIA Formula 2 Championship; 2026 season	Next round: 2026 Montreal Formula 2 round
Previous round: None	Miami Formula 2 round	Next round: TBD
