= 2026 Montreal Formula 2 round =

Motor racing event

(Canada) 2026 Montreal Formula 2 round
Round details
- Round 3 of 14 in the 2026 FIA Formula 2 Championship.
- Location: Circuit Gilles Villeneuve; Montreal, Quebec, Canada
- Course: Semi-permanent racing facility 4.361 km (2.710 mi)

Sprint Race
- Date: 23 May 2026
- Laps: 28
Podium
First	(Mexico) Noel León	Campos Racing
Second	(Italy) Gabriele Minì	MP Motorsport
Third	(Norway) Martinius Stenshorne	Rodin Motorsport
Fastest lap
Driver	(Republic of Ireland) Alex Dunne	Rodin Motorsport
- Time: 1:23.535 (on lap 23)

Feature Race
- Date: 24 May 2026
- Laps: 37
Pole position
Driver	(Netherlands) Laurens van Hoepen	Trident
Time	1:21.422	
Podium
First	(Norway) Martinius Stenshorne	Rodin Motorsport
Second	(Republic of Ireland) Alex Dunne	Rodin Motorsport
Third	(Italy) Gabriele Minì	MP Motorsport
Fastest lap
Driver	(Argentina) Nico Varrone	Van Amersfoort Racing
- Time: 1:24.394 (on lap 19)

The 2026 Montreal FIA Formula 2 round was a motor racing event held between 22 and 24 May 2026 at the Circuit Gilles Villeneuve. It was the third round of the 2026 FIA Formula 2 Championship and was held in support of the 2026 Canadian Grand Prix. It was the first time the championship raced in Canada.

== Classification ==
=== Qualifying ===
Qualifying was held on 22 May 2026, at 14:00 local time (UTC−4).

Pos.	No.	Driver	Entrant	Time/Gap	Grid SR	Grid FR
1	24	(Netherlands) Laurens van Hoepen	Trident	1:21.422	8	1
2	1	(Brazil) Rafael Câmara	Invicta Racing	+0.267	12^{1}	5^{1}
3	15	(Republic of Ireland) Alex Dunne	Rodin Motorsport	+0.287	11^{2}	6^{2}
4	6	(Bulgaria) Nikola Tsolov	Campos Racing	+0.312	7	2
5	14	(Norway) Martinius Stenshorne	Rodin Motorsport	+0.322	6	3
6	2	(Paraguay) Joshua Dürksen	Invicta Racing	+0.358	5	9^{3}
7	25	(United Kingdom) John Bennett	Trident	+0.399	4	4
8	5	(Mexico) Noel León	Campos Racing	+0.459	3	7
9	23	(Mexico) Rafael Villagómez	Van Amersfoort Racing	+0.480	2	8
10	9	(Italy) Gabriele Minì	MP Motorsport	+0.549	1	10
11	20	(Brazil) Emerson Fittipaldi Jr.	AIX Racing	+0.579	9	11
12	22	(Argentina) Nico Varrone	Van Amersfoort Racing	+0.656	10	12
13	16	(India) Kush Maini	ART Grand Prix	+0.663	13	13
14	7	(Sweden) Dino Beganovic	DAMS Lucas Oil	+0.785	14	14
15	8	(Poland) Roman Bilinski	DAMS Lucas Oil	+0.854	15	15
16	3	(Japan) Ritomo Miyata	Hitech	+0.934	16	16
17	21	(United Kingdom) Cian Shields	AIX Racing	+1.023	17	17
18	11	(Colombia) Sebastián Montoya	Prema Racing	+1.387	18	18
19	4	(United States) Colton Herta	Hitech	+1.435	19	19
20	17	(Thailand) Tasanapol Inthraphuvasak	ART Grand Prix	+1.449^{4}	—^{5}	—^{5}
21	10	(Germany) Oliver Goethe	MP Motorsport	+1.613^{4}	20	20
22	12	(Spain) Mari Boya	Prema Racing	+1.641	21	21

Notes:

- ^1 – Rafael Câmara received a three-place grid penalty for impeding Alex Dunne during qualifying. The penalty relegated Câmara from 9th to 12th on the sprint race grid, and from 2nd to 5th on the feature race grid.
- ^2 – Alex Dunne was handed a three-place grid penalty for impeding Rafael Villagómez during qualifying. The penalty relegated Dunne from 8th to 11th on the sprint race grid, and from 3rd to 6th on the feature race grid.
- ^3 – Joshua Dürksen received a five-second time penalty in the sprint race for causing a collision. However, due to Dürksen retiring from the sprint, it was converted to a three-place grid penalty for the feature race, dropping him from 6th to 9th on the grid.
- ^4 – Both Tasanapol Inthraphuvasak and Oliver Goethe had their fastest lap time deleted for being the sole cause of a red flag during qualifying. The penalty relegated Inthraphuvasak from 15th to 20th and Goethe from 19th to 21st in the classification.
- ^5 – Tasanapol Inthraphuvasak withdrew from both races following a medical decision, leaving his position on the grid vacant.

=== Sprint race ===
The sprint race was held on 23 May 2026, at 14:10 local time (UTC−4).

Pos.	No.	Driver	Entrant	Laps	Time/Retired	Grid	Points
1	5	(Mexico) Noel León	Campos Racing	28	43:36.869	3	10+1
2	9	(Italy) Gabriele Minì	MP Motorsport	28	+3.726	1	8
3	14	(Norway) Martinius Stenshorne	Rodin Motorsport	28	+5.540	6	6
4	24	(Netherlands) Laurens van Hoepen	Trident	28	+6.987	8	5
5	20	(Brazil) Emerson Fittipaldi Jr.	AIX Racing	28	+7.619	9	4
6	7	(Sweden) Dino Beganovic	DAMS Lucas Oil	28	+8.217	14	3
7	1	(Brazil) Rafael Câmara	Invicta Racing	28	+9.718	12	2
8	8	(Poland) Roman Bilinski	DAMS Lucas Oil	28	+9.949	15	1
9	4	(United States) Colton Herta	Hitech	28	+10.294	19	
10	10	(Germany) Oliver Goethe	MP Motorsport	28	+10.714	20	
11	3	(Japan) Ritomo Miyata	Hitech	28	+11.051	16	
12	16	(India) Kush Maini	ART Grand Prix	28	+11.857	13	
13	15	(Republic of Ireland) Alex Dunne	Rodin Motorsport	28	+13.199	11	
14	6	(Bulgaria) Nikola Tsolov	Campos Racing	28	+15.772	7	
15	12	(Spain) Mari Boya	Prema Racing	28	+17.657	21	
16	22	(Argentina) Nico Varrone	Van Amersfoort Racing	28	+38.563	10	
DNF	11	(Colombia) Sebastián Montoya	Prema Racing	26		18	
DNF	23	(Mexico) Rafael Villagómez	Van Amersfoort Racing	24	Accident	2	
DNF	21	(United Kingdom) Cian Shields	AIX Racing	24	Collision	17	
DNF	2	(Paraguay) Joshua Dürksen	Invicta Racing	17	Collision	5	
DNF	25	(United Kingdom) John Bennett	Trident	9	Collision	4	
DNS	17	(Thailand) Tasanapol Inthraphuvasak	ART Grand Prix	—	Withdrawn	—	
Fastest lap: (Republic of Ireland) Alex Dunne (1:23.535 on lap 23)

=== Feature race ===
The feature race was held on 24 May 2026, at 12:05 local time (UTC−4).

Pos.	No.	Driver	Entrant	Laps	Time/Retired	Grid	Points
1	14	(Norway) Martinius Stenshorne	Rodin Motorsport	37	1:03:08.023	3	25
2	15	(Republic of Ireland) Alex Dunne	Rodin Motorsport	37	+1.077	6	18
3	9	(Italy) Gabriele Minì	MP Motorsport	37	+1.313	10	15
4	11	(Colombia) Sebastián Montoya	Prema Racing	37	+2.061	18	12
5	21	(United Kingdom) Cian Shields	AIX Racing	37	+2.442	17	10
6	22	(Argentina) Nico Varrone	Van Amersfoort Racing	37	+2.666	12	8+1
7	4	(United States) Colton Herta	Hitech	37	+5.346	19	6
8	12	(Spain) Mari Boya	Prema Racing	37	+5.694	21	4
9	16	(India) Kush Maini	ART Grand Prix	37	+7.377	13	2
10	5	(Mexico) Noel León	Campos Racing	37	+8.560	7	1
11	2	(Paraguay) Joshua Dürksen	Invicta Racing	37	+11.590	9	
12	6	(Bulgaria) Nikola Tsolov	Campos Racing	37	+11.859	2	
13	8	(Poland) Roman Bilinski	DAMS Lucas Oil	37	+13.339	15	
14	1	(Brazil) Rafael Câmara	Invicta Racing	34	+3 laps	5	
DNF	10	(Germany) Oliver Goethe	MP Motorsport	33	Collision	20	
DNF	3	(Japan) Ritomo Miyata	Hitech	33	Collision	16	
DNF	7	(Sweden) Dino Beganovic	DAMS Lucas Oil	26	Engine	14	
DNF	23	(Mexico) Rafael Villagómez	Van Amersfoort Racing	16	Collision	8	
DNF	25	(United Kingdom) John Bennett	Trident	8	Collision	4	
DNF	20	(Brazil) Emerson Fittipaldi Jr.	AIX Racing	7	Accident	11	
DNF	24	(Netherlands) Laurens van Hoepen	Trident	3	Accident	1	2
DNS	17	(Thailand) Tasanapol Inthraphuvasak	ART Grand Prix	—	Withdrawn	—	
Fastest lap: (Argentina) Nico Varrone (1:24.394 on lap 19)

== Standings after the event ==
Drivers' Championship standings

	Pos.	Driver	Points
1	1	(Italy) Gabriele Minì	57
1	2	(Brazil) Rafael Câmara	36
2	3	(Bulgaria) Nikola Tsolov	35
12	4	(Norway) Martinius Stenshorne	35
1	5	(Mexico) Noel León	33

Teams' Championship standings

	Pos.	Team	Points
2	1	(Netherlands) MP Motorsport	69
1	2	(Spain) Campos Racing	68
5	3	(New Zealand) Rodin Motorsport	65
2	4	(United Kingdom) Invicta Racing	52
1	5	(United Kingdom) Hitech	38

Note: Only the top five positions are included for both sets of standings.

== See also ==
- 2026 Canadian Grand Prix

Previous round: 2026 Miami Formula 2 round	FIA Formula 2 Championship; 2026 season	Next round: 2026 Monte Carlo Formula 2 round
Previous round: None	Montreal Formula 2 round	Next round: TBD
