= 2026 Barcelona Formula 2 round =

Motor racing event

(Spain) 2026 Barcelona Formula 2 round
Round details
- Round 5 of 14 in the 2026 FIA Formula 2 Championship.
- Location: Circuit de Barcelona-Catalunya; Montmeló, Spain
- Course: Permanent racing facility 4.657 km (2.894 mi)

Sprint Race
- Date: 13 June 2026
- Laps: 26
Podium
First	(India) Kush Maini	ART Grand Prix
Second	(Italy) Gabriele Minì	MP Motorsport
Third	(Bulgaria) Nikola Tsolov	Campos Racing
Fastest lap
Driver	(India) Kush Maini	ART Grand Prix
- Time: 1:30.376 (on lap 4)

Feature Race
- Date: 14 June 2026
- Laps: 37
Pole position
Driver	(Brazil) Rafael Câmara	Invicta Racing
Time	1:24.810	
Podium
First	(Brazil) Rafael Câmara	Invicta Racing
Second	(Republic of Ireland) Alex Dunne	Rodin Motorsport
Third	(Italy) Gabriele Minì	MP Motorsport
Fastest lap
Driver	(United Kingdom) John Bennett	Trident
- Time: 1:29.478 (on lap 26)

The 2026 Barcelona FIA Formula 2 round was a motor racing event held between 12 and 14 June 2026 at the Circuit de Barcelona-Catalunya. It was the fifth round of the 2026 FIA Formula 2 Championship and was held in support of the 2026 Barcelona-Catalunya Grand Prix.

== Classification ==
=== Qualifying ===
Qualifying was held on 12 June 2026 at 15:55 local time (UTC+2).

Pos.	No.	Driver	Entrant	Time/Gap	Grid SR	Grid FR
1	1	(Brazil) Rafael Câmara	Invicta Racing	1:24.810	9	1
2	2	(Paraguay) Joshua Dürksen	Invicta Racing	+0.135	14^{1}	7^{1}
3	15	(Republic of Ireland) Alex Dunne	Rodin Motorsport	+0.225	8	2
4	9	(Italy) Gabriele Minì	MP Motorsport	+0.334	7	3
5	23	(Mexico) Rafael Villagómez	Van Amersfoort Racing	+0.373	6	4
6	6	(Bulgaria) Nikola Tsolov	Campos Racing	+0.412	5	5
7	22	(Argentina) Nico Varrone	Van Amersfoort Racing	+0.427	4	6
8	4	(United States) Colton Herta	Hitech	+0.430	3	8
9	16	(India) Kush Maini	ART Grand Prix	+0.454	2	9
10	5	(Mexico) Noel León	Campos Racing	+0.455	1	10
11	17	(Thailand) Tasanapol Inthraphuvasak	ART Grand Prix	+0.598	10	11
12	7	(Sweden) Dino Beganovic	DAMS Lucas Oil	+0.608	11	12
13	24	(Netherlands) Laurens van Hoepen	Trident	+0.711	12	13
14	10	(Germany) Oliver Goethe	MP Motorsport	+0.725	13	14
15	14	(Norway) Martinius Stenshorne	Rodin Motorsport	+0.764	15	15
16	8	(Poland) Roman Bilinski	DAMS Lucas Oil	+0.766	16	16
17	20	(Brazil) Emerson Fittipaldi Jr.	AIX Racing	+0.854	17	17
18	25	(United Kingdom) John Bennett	Trident	+0.926	18	18
19	11	(Colombia) Sebastián Montoya	Prema Racing	+1.069	19	19
20	12	(Spain) Mari Boya	Prema Racing	+1.209	20	20
21	21	(United Kingdom) Cian Shields	AIX Racing	+1.438	21	21
107% time: 1:30.746 (+5.936)
—	3	(Japan) Ritomo Miyata	Hitech	+7.810	22^{2}	22^{2}

Notes:

- ^1 – Joshua Dürksen received a five-place grid penalty for both races after ignoring waved yellow flags in qualifying. This dropped him from 9th to 14th on the sprint race grid and from 2nd to 7th on the feature race grid.
- ^2 – Ritomo Miyata had his fastest lap time cancelled due to being the sole cause of a red flag in qualifying and failed to set a time within 107% of the fastest driver. The stewards permitted Miyata to start both races from the back of the grid.

=== Sprint race ===
The sprint race was held on 13 June 2026 at 14:15 local time (UTC+2).

Pos.	No.	Driver	Entrant	Laps	Time/Retired	Grid	Points
1	16	(India) Kush Maini	ART Grand Prix	26	39:55.725	2	10+1
2	9	(Italy) Gabriele Minì	MP Motorsport	26	+7.269	7	8
3	6	(Bulgaria) Nikola Tsolov	Campos Racing	26	+12.164	5	6
4	5	(Mexico) Noel León	Campos Racing	26	+12.784	1	5
5	4	(United States) Colton Herta	Hitech	26	+13.453	3	4
6	1	(Brazil) Rafael Câmara	Invicta Racing	26	+13.828	9	3
7	7	(Sweden) Dino Beganovic	DAMS Lucas Oil	26	+16.841	11	2
8	15	(Republic of Ireland) Alex Dunne	Rodin Motorsport	26	+17.723	8	1
9	17	(Thailand) Tasanapol Inthraphuvasak	ART Grand Prix	26	+26.573	10	
10	11	(Colombia) Sebastián Montoya	Prema Racing	26	+31.007	19	
11	10	(Germany) Oliver Goethe	MP Motorsport	26	+31.893	13	
12	22	(Argentina) Nico Varrone	Van Amersfoort Racing	26	+34.918^{1}	4	
13	25	(United Kingdom) John Bennett	Trident	26	+35.514	18	
14	3	(Japan) Ritomo Miyata	Hitech	26	+35.814	22	
15	12	(Spain) Mari Boya	Prema Racing	26	+37.837	20	
16	20	(Brazil) Emerson Fittipaldi Jr.	AIX Racing	26	+38.367	17	
17	23	(Mexico) Rafael Villagómez	Van Amersfoort Racing	26	+38.460^{2}	6	
18	14	(Norway) Martinius Stenshorne	Rodin Motorsport	26	+40.402^{3}	15	
19	24	(Netherlands) Laurens van Hoepen	Trident	26	+41.087	12	
20	2	(Paraguay) Joshua Dürksen	Invicta Racing	26	+41.775	14	
21	8	(Poland) Roman Bilinski	DAMS Lucas Oil	26	+49.523^{2}	16	
22	21	(United Kingdom) Cian Shields	AIX Racing	26	+54.885	21	
Fastest lap: (India) Kush Maini (1:30.376 on lap 4)

Notes:

- ^1 – Nico Varrone received a five-second time penalty for leaving the track and gaining an advantage over Sebastián Montoya. This dropped Varrone from 10th to 12th in the final classification.
- ^2 – Rafael Villagómez and Roman Bilinski both received a ten-second time penalty for exceeding track limits five times.
- ^3 – Martinius Stenshorne received a ten-second time penalty for causing a collision with Joshua Dürksen.

=== Feature race ===
The feature race was held on 14 June 2026 at 11:25 local time (UTC+2).

Pos.	No.	Driver	Entrant	Laps	Time/Retired	Grid	Points
1	1	(Brazil) Rafael Câmara	Invicta Racing	37	58:35.839	1	25
2	15	(Republic of Ireland) Alex Dunne	Rodin Motorsport	37	+12.406	2	18
3	9	(Italy) Gabriele Minì	MP Motorsport	37	+13.468	3	15
4	6	(Bulgaria) Nikola Tsolov	Campos Racing	37	+14.851^{1}	5	12
5	24	(Netherlands) Laurens van Hoepen	Trident	37	+16.973	13	10
6	7	(Sweden) Dino Beganovic	DAMS Lucas Oil	37	+22.187	12	8
7	25	(United Kingdom) John Bennett	Trident	37	+23.713	18	6+1
8	5	(Mexico) Noel León	Campos Racing	37	+27.186	10	4
9	16	(India) Kush Maini	ART Grand Prix	37	+27.804	9	2
10	8	(Poland) Roman Bilinski	DAMS Lucas Oil	37	+29.126	16	1
11	23	(Mexico) Rafael Villagómez	Van Amersfoort Racing	37	+32.407	4	
12	17	(Thailand) Tasanapol Inthraphuvasak	ART Grand Prix	37	+33.166	11	
13	22	(Argentina) Nico Varrone	Van Amersfoort Racing	37	+36.335	6	
14	2	(Paraguay) Joshua Dürksen	Invicta Racing	37	+40.474	7	
15	4	(United States) Colton Herta	Hitech	37	+41.309	8	
16	11	(Colombia) Sebastián Montoya	Prema Racing	37	+48.471	19	
17	14	(Norway) Martinius Stenshorne	Rodin Motorsport	37	+49.767	15	
18	3	(Japan) Ritomo Miyata	Hitech	37	+50.749	22	
19	20	(Brazil) Emerson Fittipaldi Jr.	AIX Racing	37	+53.624	17	
20	21	(United Kingdom) Cian Shields	AIX Racing	37	+1:33.632^{2}	21	
21	12	(Spain) Mari Boya	Prema Racing	36	+1 lap	20	
DNF	10	(Germany) Oliver Goethe	MP Motorsport	0		14	
Fastest lap: (United Kingdom) John Bennett (1:29.478 on lap 26)

Notes:

- ^1 – Nikola Tsolov received a five-second time penalty for leaving the track and gaining an advantage over Gabriele Minì. This dropped Tsolov from 2nd to 4th in the final classification.
- ^2 – Cian Shields received a ten-second time penalty for exceeding track limits five times.

== Standings after the event ==
Drivers' Championship standings

	Pos.	Driver	Points
	1	(Italy) Gabriele Minì	86
	2	(Bulgaria) Nikola Tsolov	80
4	3	(Brazil) Rafael Câmara	69
	4	(Republic of Ireland) Alex Dunne	67
	5	(Mexico) Noel León	54

Teams' Championship standings

Pos.	Team	Points
1	(Spain) Campos Racing	134
2	(New Zealand) Rodin Motorsport	115
3	(Netherlands) MP Motorsport	98
4	(United Kingdom) Invicta Racing	90
5	(France) DAMS Lucas Oil	65

Note: Only the top five positions are included for both sets of standings.

== See also ==
- 2026 Barcelona-Catalunya Grand Prix
- 2026 Barcelona Formula 3 round

Previous round: 2026 Monte Carlo Formula 2 round	FIA Formula 2 Championship; 2026 season	Next round: 2026 Spielberg Formula 2 round
Previous round: 2025 Barcelona Formula 2 round	Barcelona Formula 2 round	Next round: TBD
