= 2026 Monte Carlo Formula 2 round =

Motor racing event

2026 Monaco Formula 2 round
Round details
- Round 4 of 14 in the 2026 FIA Formula 2 Championship.
- Location: Circuit de Monaco; La Condamine and Monte Carlo, Monaco
- Course: Street circuit 3.337 km (2.074 mi)

Sprint Race
- Date: 6 June 2026
- Laps: 30
Podium
First	(Mexico) Noel León	Campos Racing
Second	(Poland) Roman Bilinski	DAMS Lucas Oil
Third	(Italy) Gabriele Minì	MP Motorsport
Fastest lap
Driver	(Bulgaria) Nikola Tsolov	Campos Racing
- Time: 1:22.100 (on lap 23)

Feature Race
- Date: 7 June 2026
- Laps: 42
Pole position
Driver	(Brazil) Rafael Câmara	Invicta Racing
Time	1:20.923	
Podium
First	(Bulgaria) Nikola Tsolov	Campos Racing
Second	(Republic of Ireland) Alex Dunne	Rodin Motorsport
Third	(Sweden) Dino Beganovic	DAMS Lucas Oil
Fastest lap
Driver	(Bulgaria) Nikola Tsolov	Campos Racing
- Time: 1:22.244 (on lap 37)

The 2026 Monaco FIA Formula 2 round was a motor racing event held between 5 and 7 June 2026 at the Circuit de Monaco. It was the fourth round of the 2026 FIA Formula 2 Championship and was held in support of the 2026 Monaco Grand Prix.

== Classification ==
=== Qualifying ===
==== Group A ====
Qualifying for Group A was held on 5 June 2026 at 15:10 local time (UTC+2).

Pos.	No.	Driver	Entrant	Time/Gap	Grid SR	Grid FR
1	1	(Brazil) Rafael Câmara	Invicta Racing	1:20.923	10	1
2	15	(Republic of Ireland) Alex Dunne	Rodin Motorsport	+0.110	7	3
3	7	(Sweden) Dino Beganovic	DAMS Lucas Oil	+0.176	5	5
4	9	(Italy) Gabriele Minì	MP Motorsport	+0.257	3	6
5	5	(Mexico) Noel León	Campos Racing	+0.672	1	8
6	3	(Japan) Ritomo Miyata	Hitech	+0.881	11	10
7	17	(Thailand) Tasanapol Inthraphuvasak	ART Grand Prix	+0.922	13	12
8	11	(Colombia) Sebastián Montoya	Prema Racing	+0.947	15	14
9	23	(Mexico) Rafael Villagómez	Van Amersfoort Racing	+1.927	18	17
10	21	(United Kingdom) Cian Shields	AIX Racing	+2.154	20	20
107% time: 1:26.587 (+5.664)
—	25	(United Kingdom) John Bennett	Trident	+15.832	22^{1}	22^{1}

Notes:

- ^1 – John Bennett failed to set a time within 107% of the fastest driver after having his fastest lap time deleted due to being the sole cause of a red flag. He was permitted by the stewards to start at the back of the grid for both races.

==== Group B ====
Qualifying for Group B was held on 5 June 2026 at 15:10 local time (UTC+2).

Pos.	No.	Driver	Entrant	Time/Gap	Grid SR	Grid FR
1	6	(Bulgaria) Nikola Tsolov	Campos Racing	1:21.053	9	2
2	14	(Norway) Martinius Stenshorne	Rodin Motorsport	+0.221	6	4
3	16	(India) Kush Maini	ART Grand Prix	+0.285	8^{1}	9^{1}
4	8	(Poland) Roman Bilinski	DAMS Lucas Oil	+0.309	2	7
5	2	(Paraguay) Joshua Dürksen	Invicta Racing	+0.504	4^{2}	18^{2}
6	10	(Germany) Oliver Goethe	MP Motorsport	+0.620	12	11
7	4	(United States) Colton Herta	Hitech	+0.719	14	13
8	22	(Argentina) Nico Varrone	Van Amersfoort Racing	+0.766	16	15
9	12	(Spain) Mari Boya	Prema Racing	+1.317	17	16
10	20	(Brazil) Emerson Fittipaldi Jr.	AIX Racing	+1.355	19	19
107% time: 1:26.726 (+5.673)
—	24	(Netherlands) Laurens van Hoepen	Trident	No time^{3}	21	21

Notes:

- ^1 – Kush Maini received a three-place grid penalty for both races due to causing a collision with Laurens van Hoepen during qualifying.
- ^2 – Joshua Dürksen was handed a three-place grid penalty for both races due to impeding Kush Maini during qualifying. Dürksen also received a five-place grid penalty on the feature race grid for failing to have the correct number of tyres during qualifying.
- ^3 – Laurens van Hoepen failed to set a time within 107% of the fastest driver. He was given permission from the stewards to start both races.

=== Sprint race ===
The sprint race was held on 6 June 2026 at 14:15 local time (UTC+2).

Pos.	No.	Driver	Entrant	Laps	Time/Retired	Grid	Points
1	5	(Mexico) Noel León	Campos Racing	30	43:06.407	1	10
2	8	(Poland) Roman Bilinski	DAMS Lucas Oil	30	+3.406	2	8
3	9	(Italy) Gabriele Minì	MP Motorsport	30	+4.002	3	6
4	2	(Paraguay) Joshua Dürksen	Invicta Racing	30	+4.376	4	5
5	7	(Sweden) Dino Beganovic	DAMS Lucas Oil	30	+4.954	5	4
6	14	(Norway) Martinius Stenshorne	Rodin Motorsport	30	+6.373	6	3
7	16	(India) Kush Maini	ART Grand Prix	30	+7.633	8	2
8	1	(Brazil) Rafael Câmara	Invicta Racing	30	+24.194	10	1
9	15	(Republic of Ireland) Alex Dunne	Rodin Motorsport	30	+29.031	7	
10	6	(Bulgaria) Nikola Tsolov	Campos Racing	30	+51.581	9	0+1
11	3	(Japan) Ritomo Miyata	Hitech	30	+1:09.160^{1}	11	
12	22	(Argentina) Nico Varrone	Van Amersfoort Racing	30	+1:11.794	16	
13	11	(Colombia) Sebastián Montoya	Prema Racing	30	+1:14.508	15	
14	12	(Spain) Mari Boya	Prema Racing	30	+1:14.939	17	
15	4	(United States) Colton Herta	Hitech	30	+1:17.399	14	
16	23	(Mexico) Rafael Villagómez	Van Amersfoort Racing	30	+1:20.117	18	
17	20	(Brazil) Emerson Fittipaldi Jr.	AIX Racing	30	+1:21.380	19	
18	21	(United Kingdom) Cian Shields	AIX Racing	30	+1:23.108	20	
19	24	(Netherlands) Laurens van Hoepen	Trident	30	+1:25.644^{2}	21	
20	25	(United Kingdom) John Bennett	Trident	29	+1 lap	22	
DNF	17	(Thailand) Tasanapol Inthraphuvasak	ART Grand Prix	26	+4 laps	13	
DNF	10	(Germany) Oliver Goethe	MP Motorsport	20	Collision damage	12	
Fastest lap: (Bulgaria) Nikola Tsolov (1:22.100 on lap 23)

Notes:

- ^1 – Ritomo Miyata received a ten-second time penalty for causing a collision with Oliver Goethe. Miyata's final classification was unaffected by the penalty.
- ^2 – Laurens van Hoepen was given a ten-second time penalty for leaving the track and gaining an advantage.

=== Feature race ===
The feature race was held on 7 June 2026 at 09:25 local time (UTC+2).

Pos.	No.	Driver	Entrant	Laps	Time/Retired	Grid	Points
1	6	(Bulgaria) Nikola Tsolov	Campos Racing	42	1:00:19.442	2	25+1
2	15	(Republic of Ireland) Alex Dunne	Rodin Motorsport	42	+9.013	3	18
3	7	(Sweden) Dino Beganovic	DAMS Lucas Oil	42	+26.471	5	15
4	16	(India) Kush Maini	ART Grand Prix	42	+30.203	9	12
5	14	(Norway) Martinius Stenshorne	Rodin Motorsport	42	+30.294	4	10
6	3	(Japan) Ritomo Miyata	Hitech	42	+30.859	10	8
7	20	(Brazil) Emerson Fittipaldi Jr.	AIX Racing	42	+40.542	19	6
8	11	(Colombia) Sebastián Montoya	Prema Racing	42	+42.157	14	4
9	5	(Mexico) Noel León	Campos Racing	42	+42.506	8	2
10	8	(Poland) Roman Bilinski	DAMS Lucas Oil	42	+43.015	7	1
11	9	(Italy) Gabriele Minì	MP Motorsport	42	+43.573	6	
12	24	(Netherlands) Laurens van Hoepen	Trident	42	+47.323	21	
13	17	(Thailand) Tasanapol Inthraphuvasak	ART Grand Prix	42	+48.010	12	
14	10	(Germany) Oliver Goethe	MP Motorsport	42	+55.610	11	
15	2	(Paraguay) Joshua Dürksen	Invicta Racing	42	+1:05.734	18	
16	12	(Spain) Mari Boya	Prema Racing	42	+1:10.603	16	
17	21	(United Kingdom) Cian Shields	AIX Racing	42	+1:10.691	20	
18	25	(United Kingdom) John Bennett	Trident	42	+1:13.229	22	
19	4	(United States) Colton Herta	Hitech	42	+1:15.197^{1}	13	
20	22	(Argentina) Nico Varrone	Van Amersfoort Racing	42	+1:17.159	15	
21	23	(Mexico) Rafael Villagómez	Van Amersfoort Racing	42	+1:21.546	17	
DNF	1	(Brazil) Rafael Câmara	Invicta Racing	34	Accident	1	
Fastest lap: (Bulgaria) Nikola Tsolov (1:22.244 on lap 37)

Notes:

- ^1 – Colton Herta received a ten-second time penalty for overtaking Ritomo Miyata during a Virtual Safety Car.

== Standings after the event ==
Drivers' Championship standings

	Pos.	Driver	Points
	1	(Italy) Gabriele Minì	63
1	2	(Bulgaria) Nikola Tsolov	62
1	3	(Norway) Martinius Stenshorne	48
3	4	(Republic of Ireland) Alex Dunne	48
	5	(Mexico) Noel León	45

Teams' Championship standings

	Pos.	Team	Points
1	1	(Spain) Campos Racing	107
1	2	(New Zealand) Rodin Motorsport	96
2	3	(Netherlands) MP Motorsport	75
	4	(United Kingdom) Invicta Racing	60
3	5	(France) DAMS Lucas Oil	54

Note: Only the top five positions are included for both sets of standings.

== See also ==
- 2026 Monaco Grand Prix
- 2026 Monte Carlo Formula 3 round

Previous round: 2026 Montreal Formula 2 round	FIA Formula 2 Championship; 2026 season	Next round: 2026 Barcelona Formula 2 round
Previous round: 2025 Monte Carlo Formula 2 round	Monte Carlo Formula 2 round	Next round: 2027 Monte Carlo Formula 2 round
