= Nikita Bedrin =

Russian racing driver (born 2006)

- Никита Бедрин
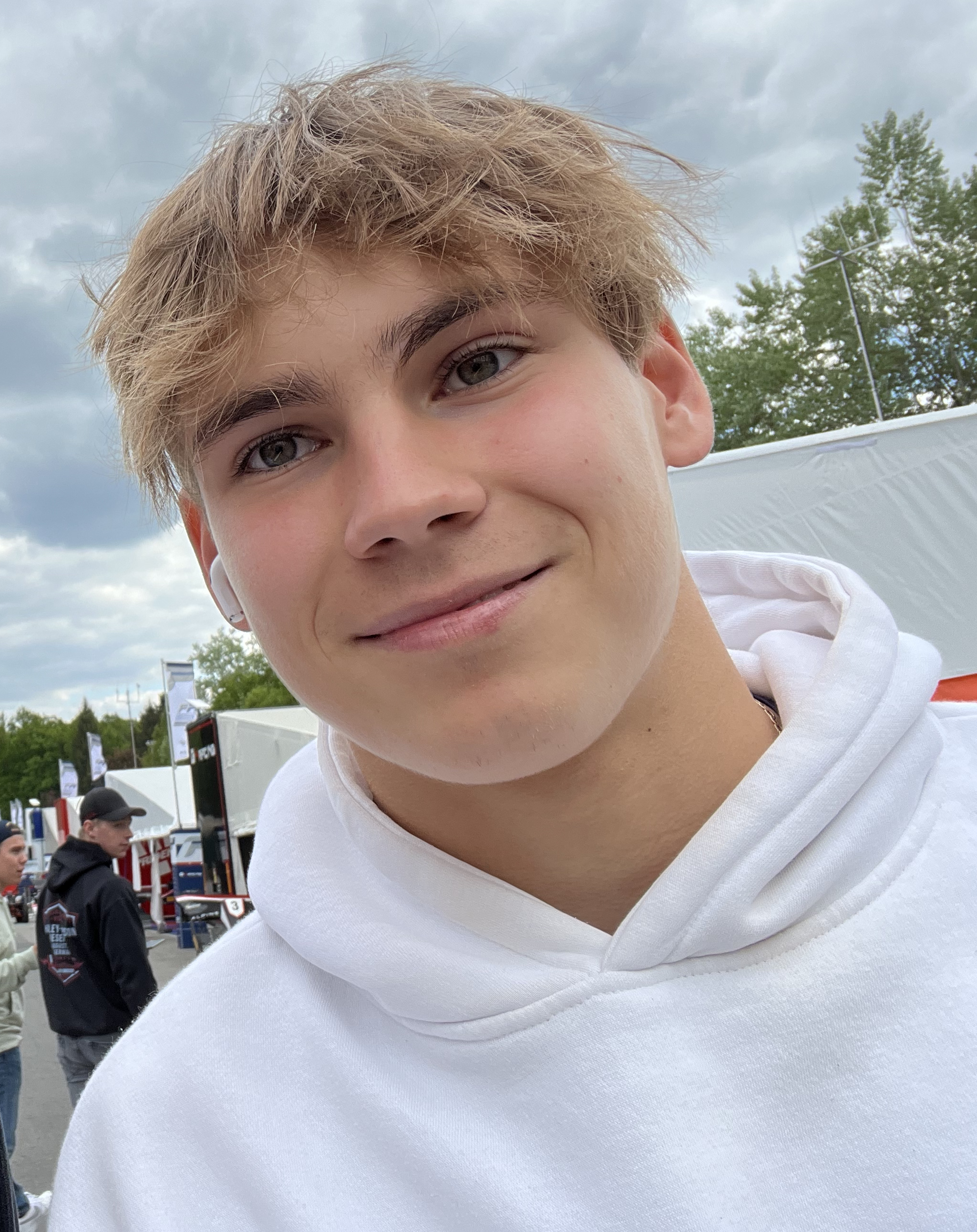
- Bedrin in 2025
- Born: Nikita Vyacheslavovich Bedrin; 6 January 2006 (age 20); Belgorod, Russia
- Nationality: (Russia) Russian; (Italy) Italian (Note: Following the Russian invasion of Ukraine in 2022, the FIA banned competitors from racing under the Russian and Belarusian flags; Bedrin opted to compete under an Italian licence, rather than compete neutrally.)

GB3 Championship career
- Debut season: 2026
- Current team: VRD Racing
- Car number: 20
- Starts: 23
- Wins: 8
- Podiums: 15
- Poles: 7
- Fastest laps: 10
- Best finish: 1st in 2026

Previous series
- 2024–2025; 2024; 2023–2025; 2023, 2025; 2021–2022; 2021–2022; 2021–2022, 2024: FR European; Eurocup-3; FIA Formula 3; FR Middle East; Italian F4; ADAC F4; F4 UAE

Championship titles
- 2026: GB3 Championship

Nikita Vyacheslavovich Bedrin (Russian: Никита Вячеславович Бедрин; born 6 January 2006) is a Russian-Italian racing driver who currently competes in the GB3 Championship for VRD Racing.

Bedrin finished fourth in the 2022 ADAC Formula 4 Championship and is a race winner in Italian F4. He is a member of the DS Penske Driver Development Program in Formula E. He previously competed in the FIA Formula 3 Championship from 2023 to 2025 for Jenzer Motorsport and AIX Racing.

== Early and personal life ==
Nikita Vyacheslavovich Bedrin was born on 6 January 2006, in Belgorod, Russia.

== Career ==
=== Karting ===
Having started out his karting career in his homeland, Bedrin won the Russian Karting Championship twice before moving to Italy to compete on the more competitive European stage. His karting career proved to be a success, with him winning the Italian Championship in 2019 and the WSK Super Master Series in his final year of karting in 2020, as well as finishing fourth in the European Championship during the same year.

=== Formula 4 ===
==== 2021 ====
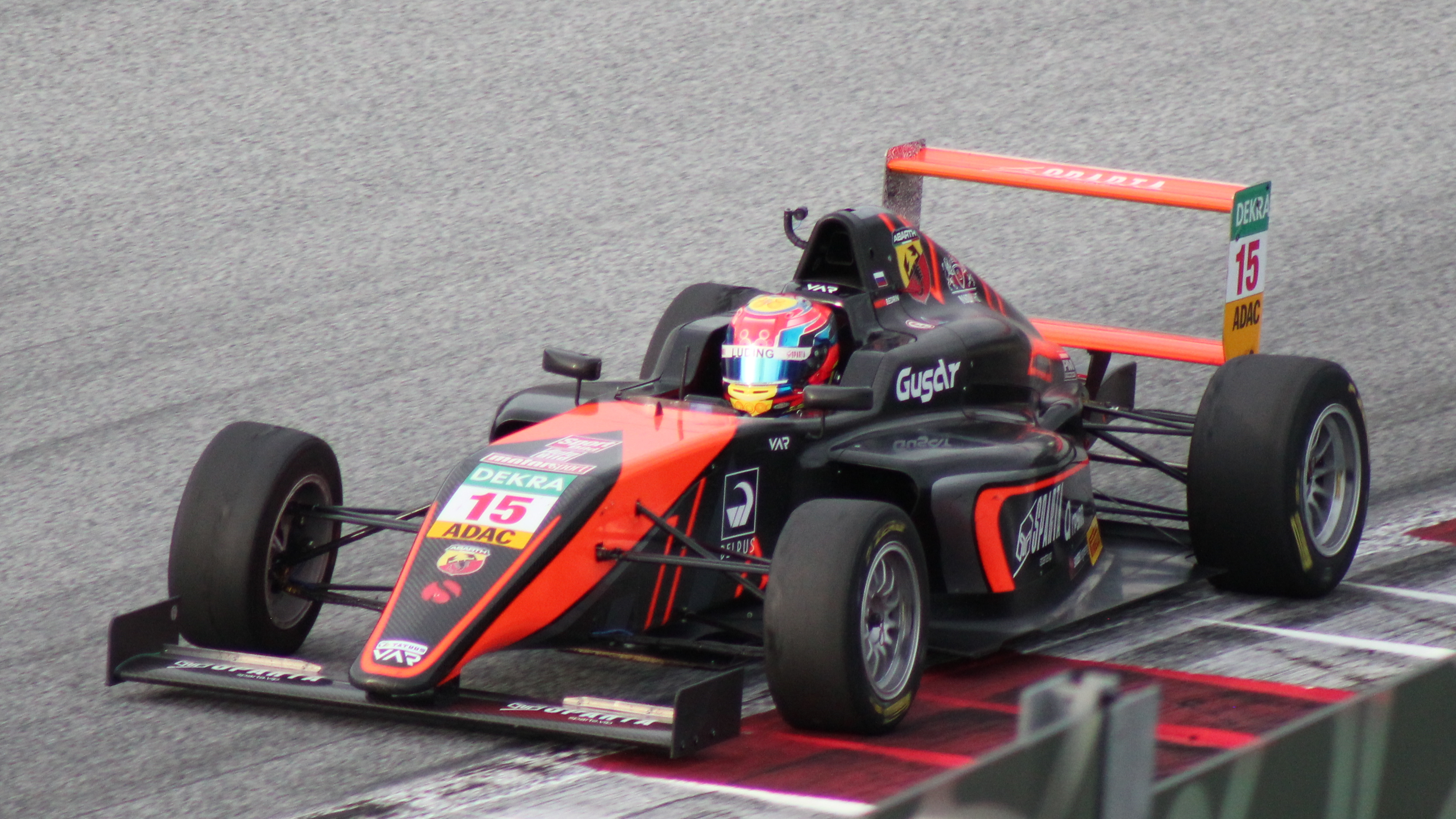
Bedrin racing in the 2021 ADAC Formula 4 Championship at the Red Bull Ring

Bedrin graduated to cars in 2021, racing in the Formula 4 UAE Championship with Xcel Motorsport. He scored his first podium in the second round, taking third in race three, but would sustain a hand injury during the following round which would end his campaign prematurely.

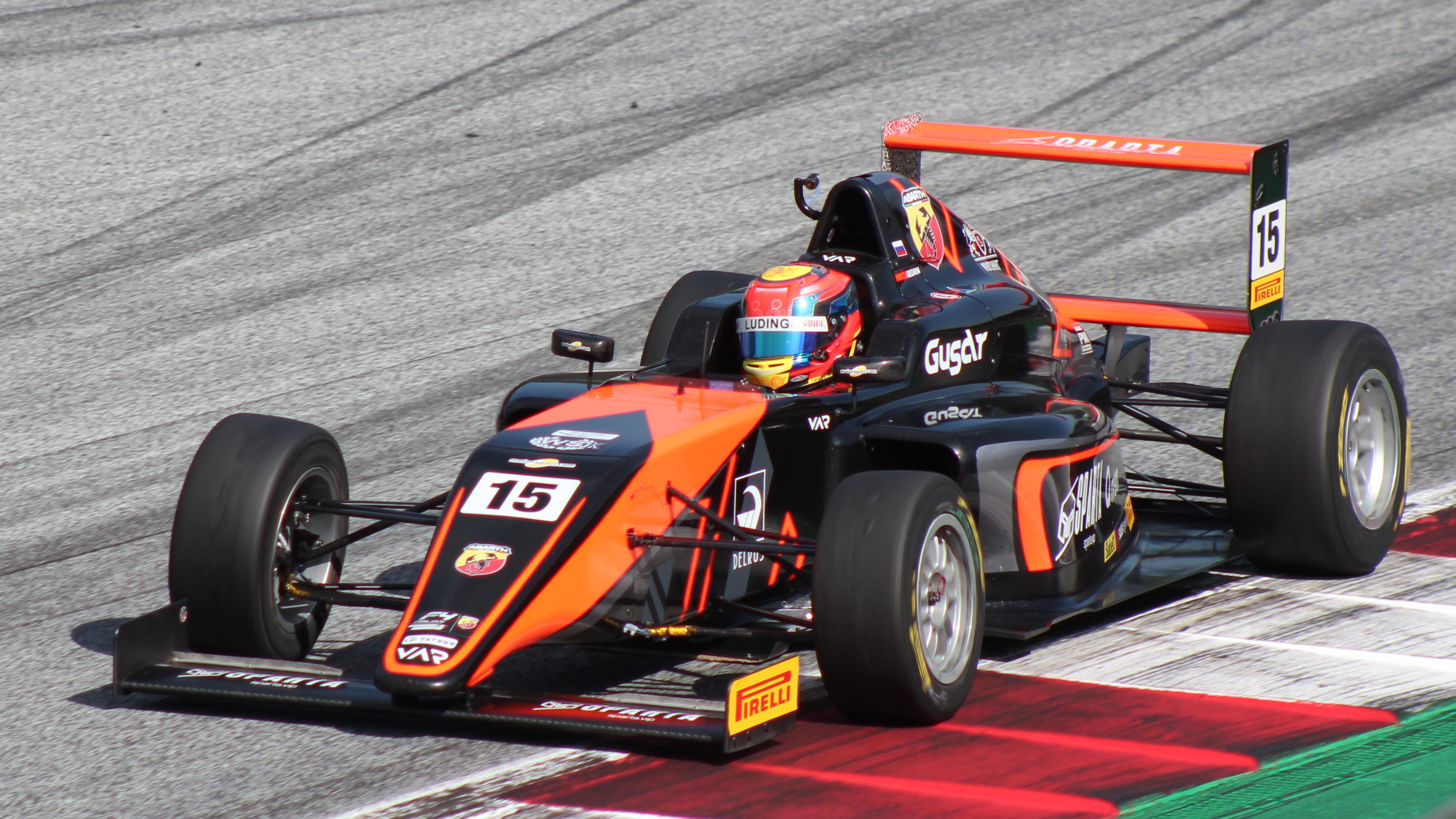
Bedrin racing in the 2021 Italian F4 Championship at the Red Bull Ring.

Bedrin's main campaign would be in the Italian and ADAC F4 series, partnering Ollie Bearman, Joshua Dufek, Bence Válint and Han Cenyu at Van Amersfoort Racing. He would score points regularly in Italy, with the season highlight being a triple of podiums at Imola Circuit, where Bedrin was awarded the Race 3 victory after a disqualification for Bearman due to a technical infringement. A further third-placed rostrum in Mugello meant Bedrin finished eighth in the overall standings.

Over in Germany, Bedrin started the season with two podiums in the opening two rounds, before taking his first win in the campaign in Hockenheim. A second win during the final race during the Nürburgring season finale elevated him up to fifth overall. His frequent points finishes and flurry of podiums also brought him the rookie title in both championships.

==== 2022 ====
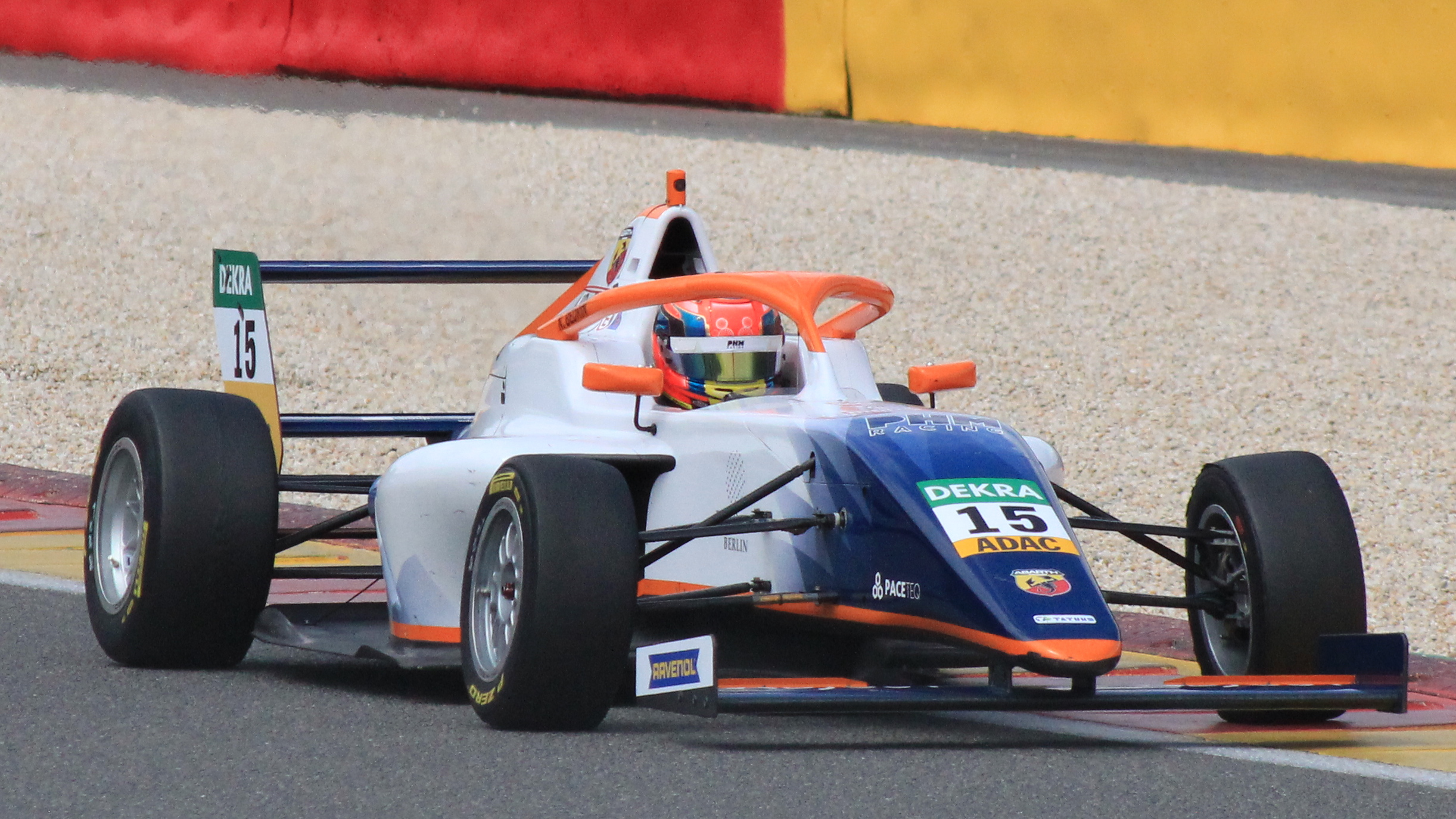
Bedrin racing in the 2022 ADAC Formula 4 Championship at Spa-Francorchamps.

The following year, Bedrin returned to the category, starting his season in the F4 UAE Championship, where he drove alongside Taylor Barnard and Jonas Ried for new team PHM Racing. His campaign proved to be a success, as he took two wins, one a piece in Dubai and Abu Dhabi, which led Bedrin on to finish fourth in the standings.

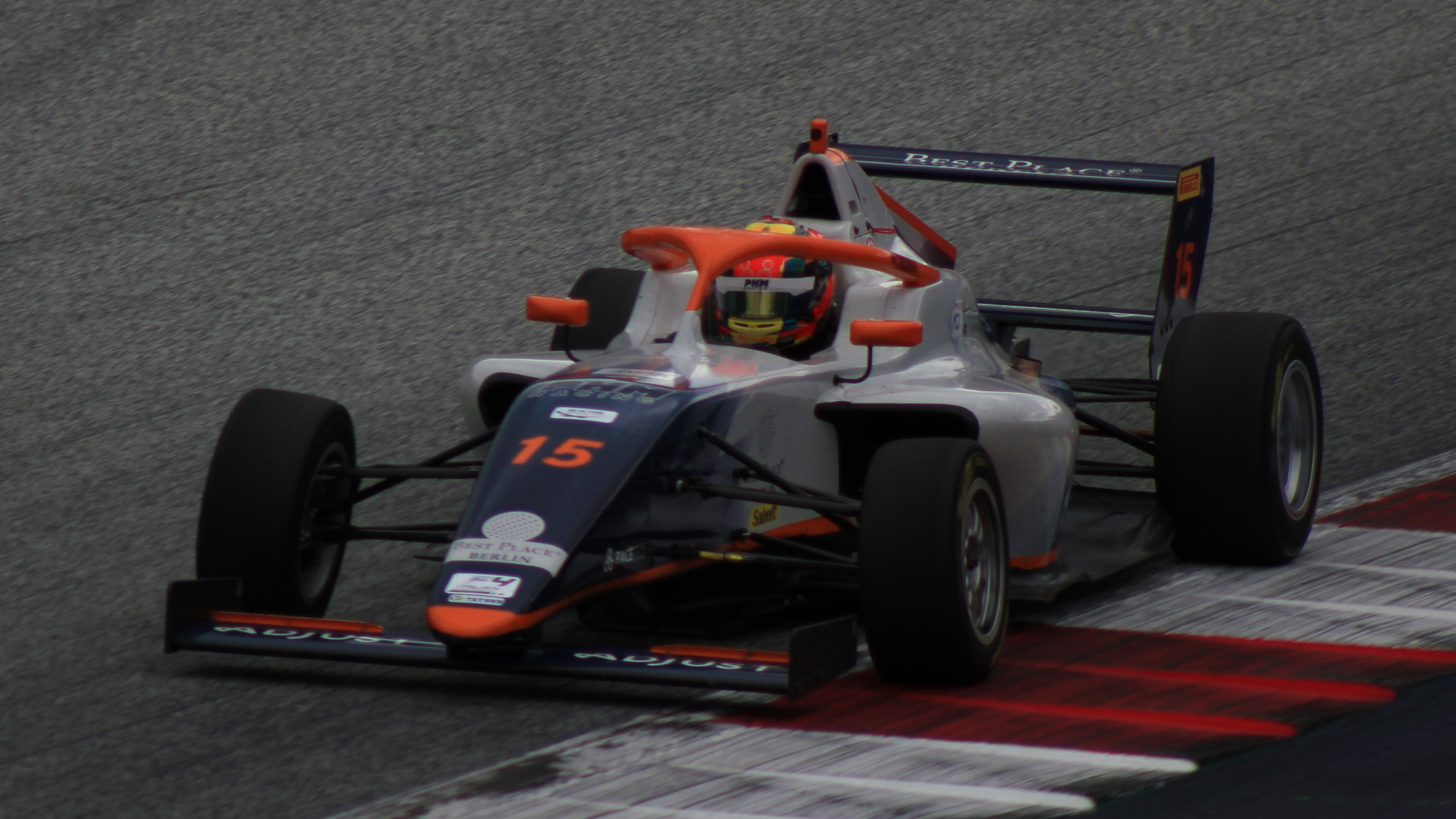
Bedrin racing in the 2022 Italian F4 Championship at the Red Bull Ring.

Bedrin would follow that up by returning to the Italian F4 and ADAC F4 series, once again driving for PHM. In the former, Bedrin took a pair of podiums but was hampered by an inconsistent end to the season, leaving him twelfth in the championship. Meanwhile, his season in ADAC Formula 4 would bear more fruit, as he finished fourth overall, with six podiums, including a lone win at a rainy Lausitzring, under his belt.

==== 2024 ====
Bedrin would return to Formula 4 for 2024, participating in the 2024 Formula 4 UAE Championship for PHM Racing. A successful opening round in Yas Marina followed as he took the win in the second race following a late pass on Jack Beeton. Despite only one podium in the second Yas Marina round, Bedrin closed his three-round campaign in the championship with a double victory in Dubai Autodrome. Despite missing the remaining two rounds of the championship, Bedrin placed fifth in the standings with three wins, four podiums and 124 points.

=== FIA Formula 3 ===
==== 2023 ====
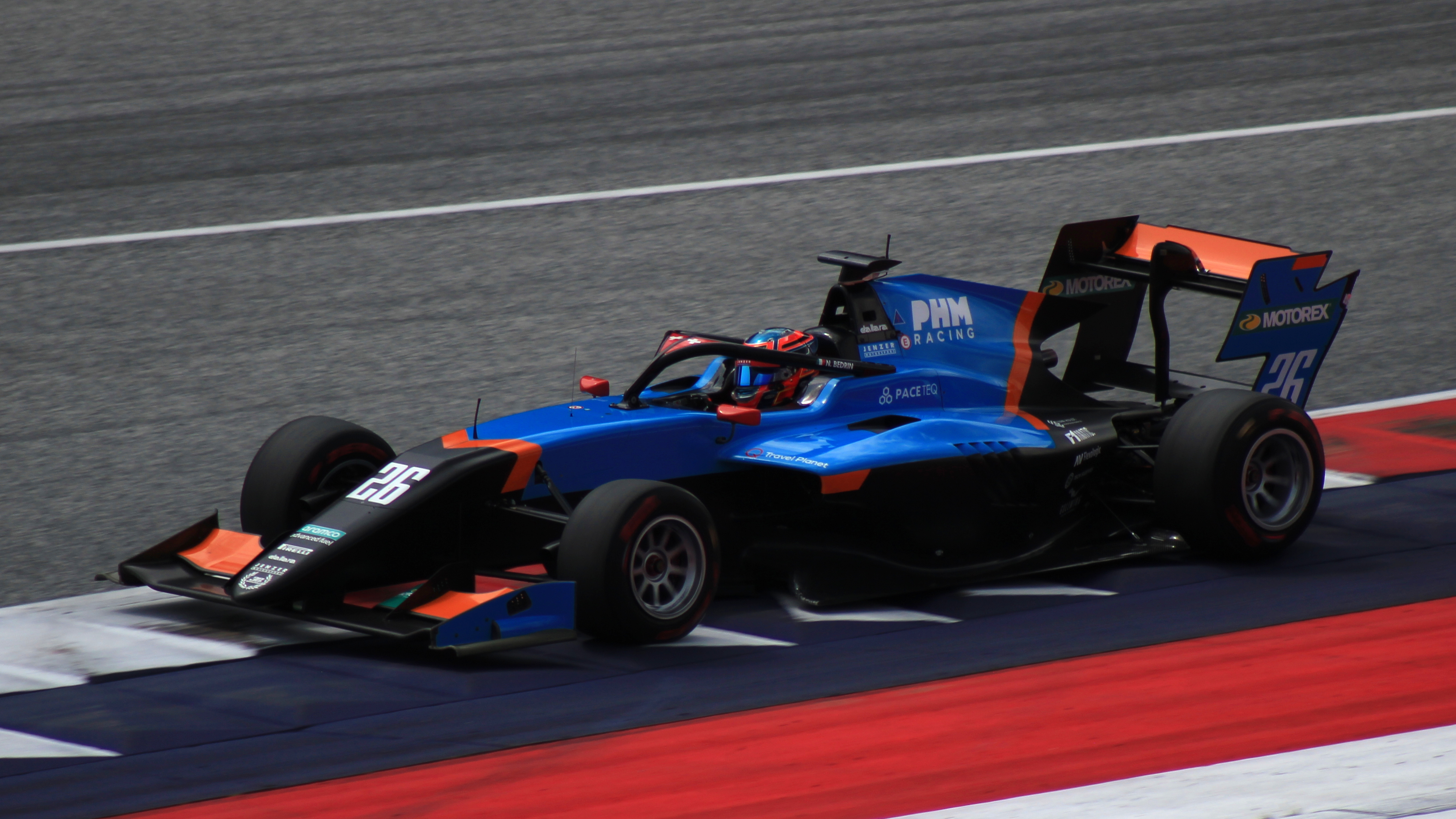
Bedrin driving the Dallara F3 2019 during the 2023 Spielberg Formula 3 round.

In September 2022, Bedrin took part in the FIA Formula 3 post-season test for Jenzer Motorsport together with his PHM teammate Taylor Barnard and Euroformula Open driver Alex García. He would subsequently be signed up for the 2023 F3 season, driving for Jenzer Motorsport. After failing to score in the opening three rounds, Bedrin opened his account by scoring his first point in sprint race at Barcelona by finishing tenth in sprint and then 11th in the feature race. He secured his first ever FIA Formula 3 podium on Hungaroring by finishing third in the sprint race. He even led for seven laps, but lost the lead to Gabriele Minì and then on the last lap to championship leader Gabriel Bortoleto for second. In Belgium, Bedrin ambled in the feature race by starting on wet tyres as his teammates and a few other drivers, which would see him up to third place by the chequered flag and getting another podium. It would be his final points finish of the season and he ended in 18th overall, with 24 points.

==== 2024 ====
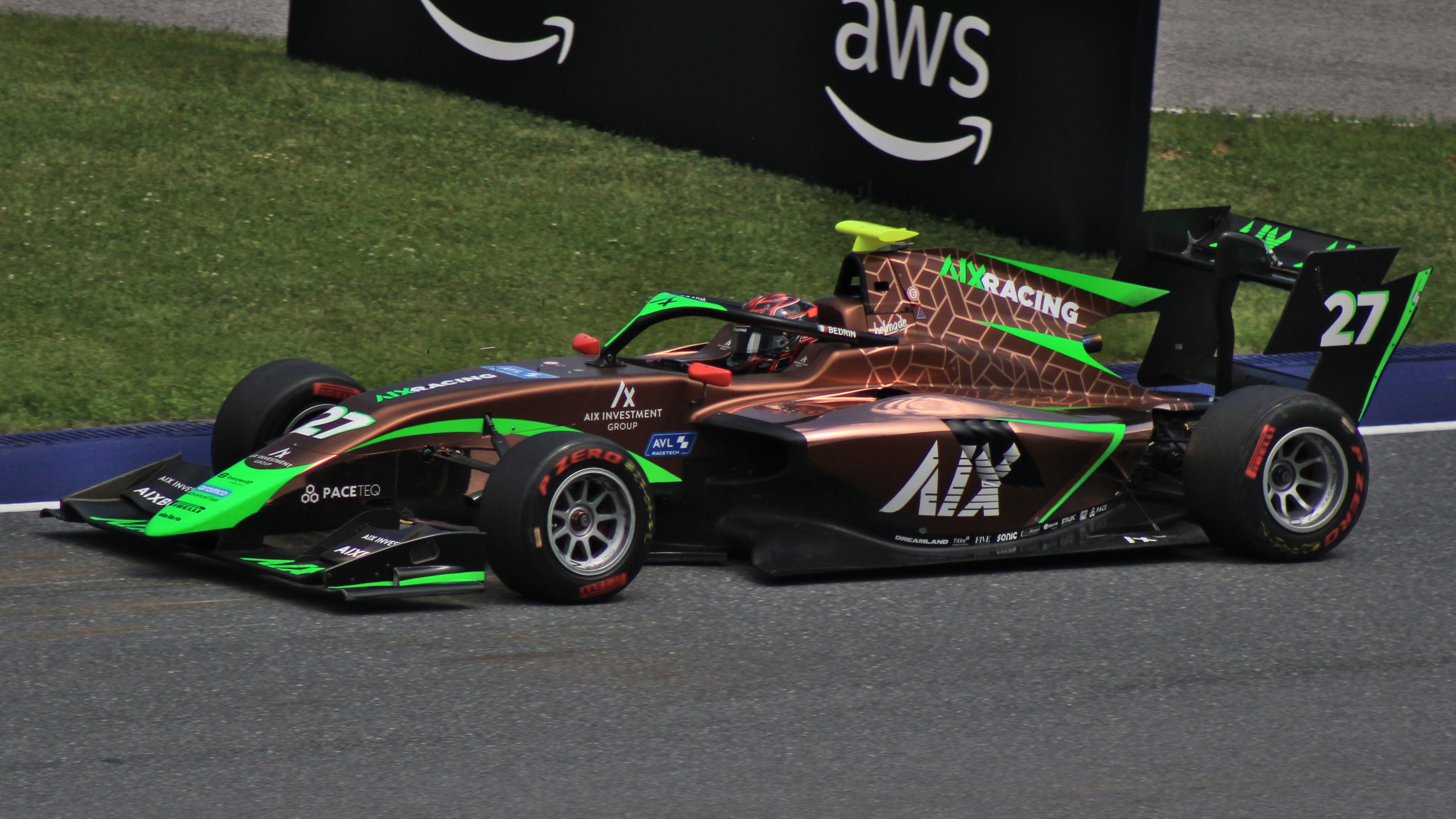
Bedrin driving for PHM AIX Racing during the 2024 Spielberg Formula 3 round

Despite uncertainty if he would remain on the grid for 2024, Bedrin would return to PHM Racing for his second season, partnering Tasanapol Inthraphuvasak and Joshua Dufek. After a shaky start in Bahrain, He impressed in Melbourne qualifying, securing his best result of fourth on the grid. He was set for his first points of the season with eighth in the sprint race, but was dropped to 21st for gaining an advantage off-track. Despite that, he would finish eighth in the feature race. He scored back-to-back in the Imola sprint race, but went on a barren streak without points until the Silverstone feature race, where he finished ninth. Qualifying 11th for Hungary, Bedrin took the lead from Dino Beganovic on the opening lap of the sprint race. From there, he would take his first Formula 3 win, claiming AIX Racing's first win as well. He concluded his successful weekend with seventh in the feature race, which proved to be his final points finish of the season. Bedrin ended the season 19th in the championship, with 25 points, ahead of teammates Inthraphuvasak and Dufek.

==== 2025 ====
Amidst uncertainty on his future for the second year in a row, AIX Racing retained Bedrin to compete in the opening race of the 2025 season in Melbourne, alongside teammates Javier Sagrera and Nicola Marinangeli.

=== Formula Regional ===
==== 2023 ====
At the start of 2023, Bedrin competed in the 2023 Formula Regional Middle East Championship with PHM Racing. After a mediocre first half of the campaign, Bedrin made his mark during the fourth round of the championship as he took his first Formula Regional victory from pole position. He was able to replicate this feat during the final race of the season in Yas Marina, elevating himself to eighth in the standings with 78 points.

Following his F3 season, Bedrin moved down to the Formula Regional European Championship later that year, joining Monolite Racing for Zandvoort. He would later move to Van Amersfoort Racing for the final race in Hockenheim. Throughout his short two-round stint, Bedrin was able to clinch a third place during the first race in Hockenheim.

==== 2024 ====
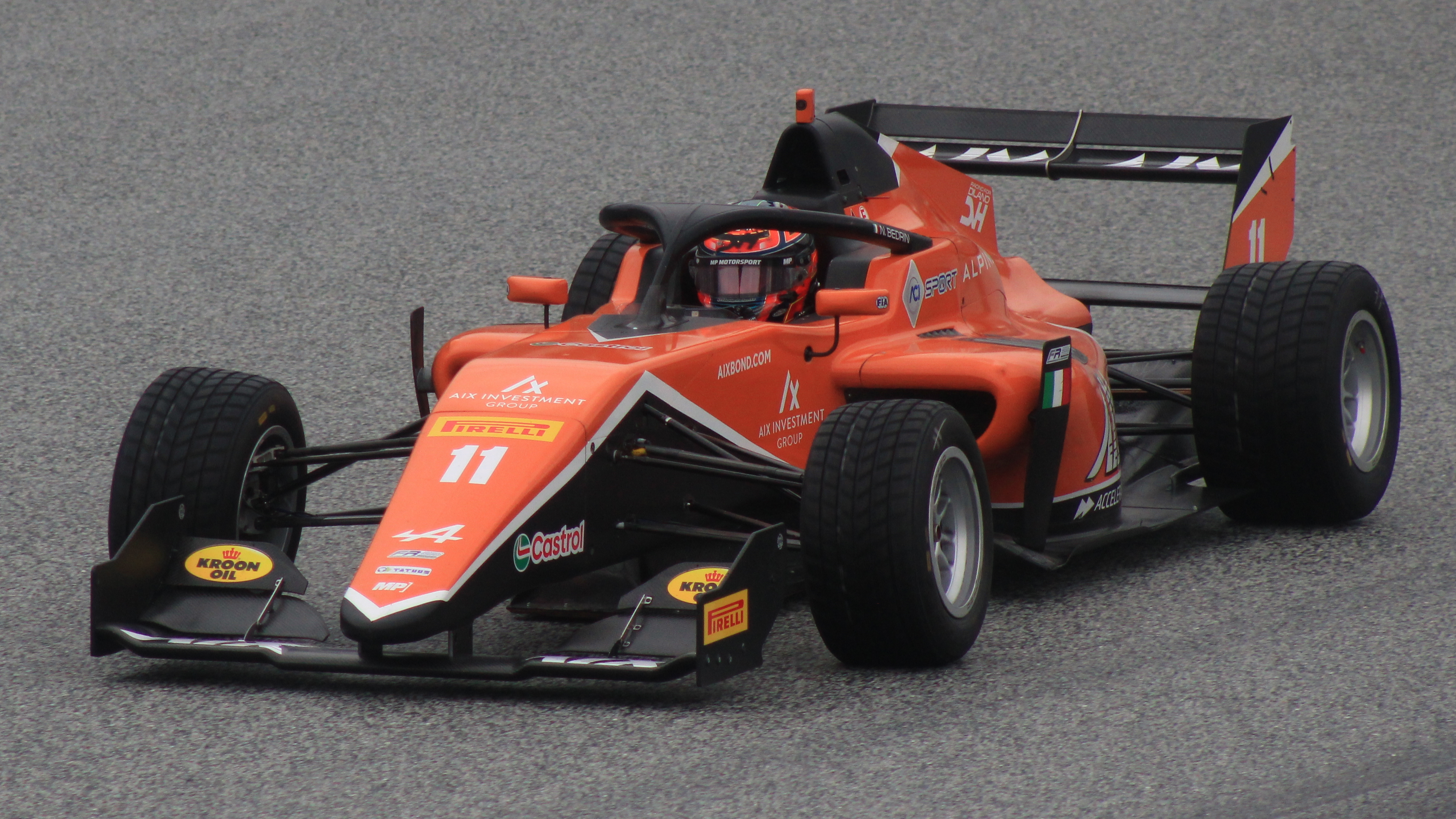
Bedrin driving at the Red Bull Ring during the 2024 Formula Regional European Championship

Alongside his FIA Formula 3 campaign, Bedrin would race full-time in the 2024 Formula Regional European Championship with MP Motorsport, although he would prioritise the former over the latter in clashing events. He missed three rounds due to his aforementioned commitments; his highest finish being a sixth during the Hockenheim opener and the Monza season finale saw him place 16th in the standings with 33 points.

In November 2024, Bedrin made his Eurocup-3 debut with Drivex, during the final round in Circuit de Barcelona-Catalunya.

==== 2025 ====
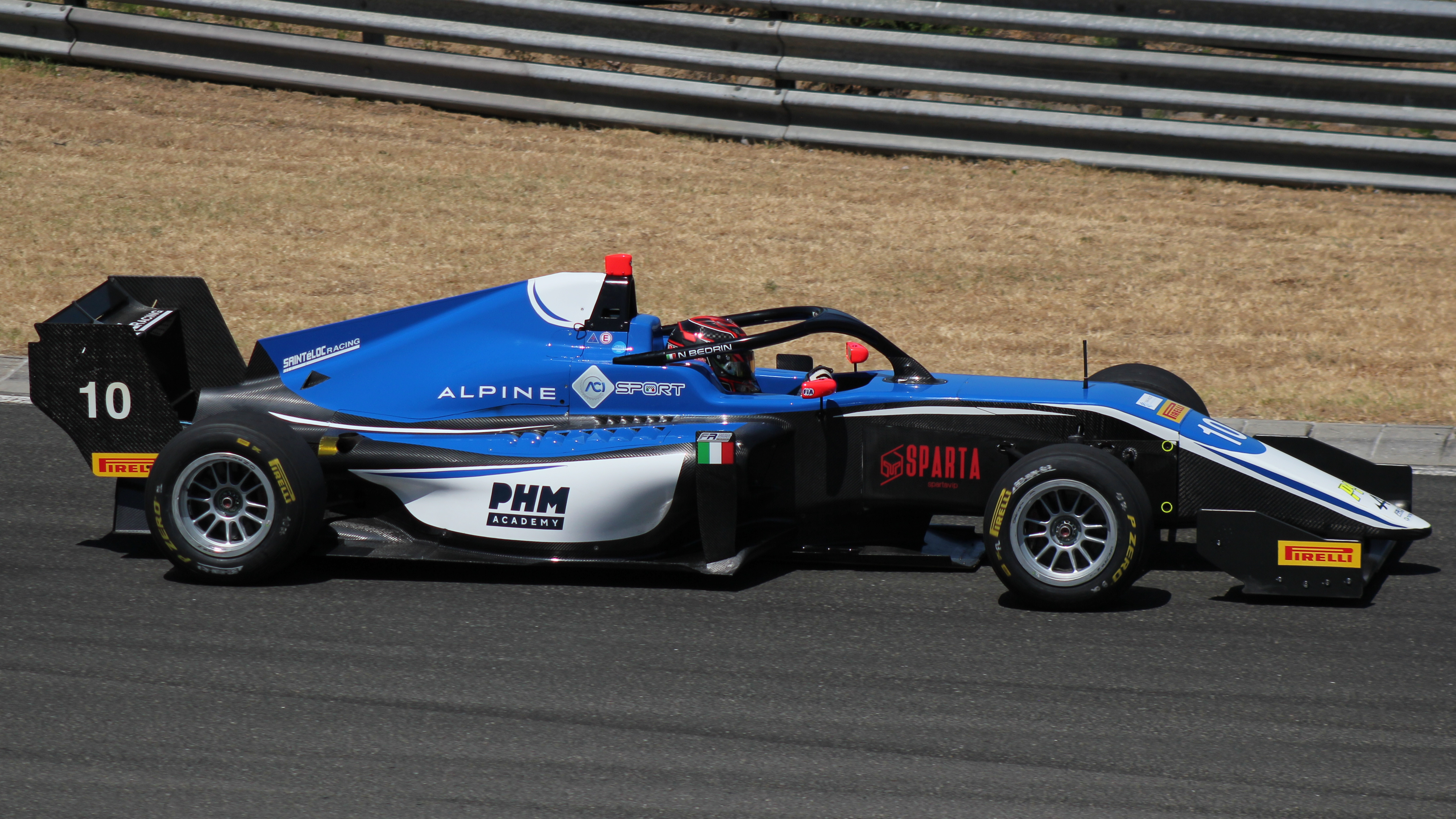
Bedrin driving at the Hungaroring during the 2025 Formula Regional European Championship

Bedrin returned to the Formula Regional Middle East Championship at the start of 2025, racing the final two rounds with Saintéloc Racing. He was on form immediately, returning to the podium in only the second race in Yas Marina. An outstanding weekend in Qatar followed as he took the win in the first race before sweeping the podium in the other two, lifting himself to eleventh in the standings.

After prematurely failing to secure an F3 seat for 2025, Bedrin continued in the Formula Regional European Championship for the year, racing with Saintéloc Racing.

==== 2026 ====
Bedrin moved to GB3 in 2026, joining VRD Racing while still being part of the PHM Racing Academy.

=== Formula E ===
In June 2025, Bedrin was announced to be one of the rookie drivers for DS Penske during the Berlin rookie test, as well as becoming part its Driver Development Program. In 2026, he participated in the rookie free practice session during the Miami ePrix, and the Madrid ePrix rookie test.

== Karting record ==
=== Karting career summary ===
Season	Series	Team	Position
2016	Russian Championship — Super Mini		**1st**
2016	Andrea Margutti Trophy — 60 Mini		14th
2016	WSK Champions Cup — 60 Mini		28th
2016	WSK Super Master Series — 60 Mini		31st
2016	Trofeo Industrie — 60 Mini		**1st**
2016	WSK Night Edition — 60 Mini		**1st**
2016	ROK Cup International Final — Mini ROK		30th
2016	WSK Final Cup — 60 Mini		26th
2017	South Garda Winter Cup — Mini ROK	Baby Race Academy	**2nd**
2017	WSK Champions Cup — 60 Mini	Baby Race Academy	**3rd**
2017	Andrea Margutti Trophy — 60 Mini	Baby Race Academy	**2nd**
2017	ROK Cup International Final — Mini ROK	Baby Race Academy	**2nd**
2017	Trofeo Industrie — 60 Mini	Baby Race Academy	**1st**
2017	WSK Super Master Series — 60 Mini	Baby Race Academy	**2nd**
2017	WSK Final Cup — 60 Mini	Baby Race Academy	6th
2017	Asian Open Championship — Mini ROK	Mars Racing Team	1st
2018	WSK Champions Cup — OKJ	Baby Race Academy	8th
2018	South Garda Winter Cup — OKJ	Baby Race Academy	12th
2018	CIK-FIA European Championship — OKJ	Tony Kart Racing Team	15th
2018	CIK-FIA World Championship — OKJ	Tony Kart Racing Team	32nd
2018	WSK Final Cup — OKJ	Tony Kart Racing Team	6th
2019	Italian Championship — OKJ		**1st**
2019	South Garda Winter Cup — OKJ	Tony Kart Racing Team	7th
2019	WSK Open Cup — OKJ	Tony Kart Racing Team	5th
2019	WSK Euro Series — OKJ	Tony Kart Racing Team	**3rd**
2019	WSK Super Master Series — OKJ	Tony Kart Racing Team	7th
2019	CIK-FIA European Championship — OKJ	Tony Kart Racing Team	5th
2019	CIK-FIA World Championship — OKJ	Tony Kart Racing Team	10th
2019	WSK Final Cup — OKJ	Tony Kart Racing Team	**2nd**
2020	WSK Champions Cup — OK	Ward Racing	4th
2020	South Garda Winter Cup — OK	Ward Racing	5th
2020	Champions of the Future — OK	Ward Racing	**1st**
2020	WSK Super Master Series — OK	Ward Racing	**1st**
2020	WSK Euro Series — OK	Ward Racing	4th
2020	CIK-FIA European Championship — OK	Ward Racing	4th
2020	CIK-FIA World Championship — OK	Ward Racing	29th

=== Complete CIK-FIA results ===
==== Complete CIK-FIA Karting World Championship results ====
Year	Entrant	Class	Circuit	QH	F
2018	Tony Kart Racing Team	OK-J	(Sweden) Kristianstad	29th	Ret (Note: Did not finish, but was classified 32nd.)
2019	Tony Kart Racing Team	OK-J	(Finland) Alahärmä	19th	10th
2020	Ward Racing	OK	(Portugal) Portimão	13th	Ret (Note: Did not finish, but was classified 29th.)

==== Complete CIK-FIA Karting European Championship results ====
(key) (Races in bold indicate pole position; races in italics indicate fastest lap)

Year	Entrant	Class	1	2	3	4	5	6	7	8	Pos	Points
2018	Tony Kart Racing Team	OK-J	SAR; QH; 7	SAR; F 26	PFI; QH; 54	PFI; F DNQ	AMP; QH; 9	AMP; F 20	**ESS**; **QH**; 1	**ESS**; **F** Ret	15th	16
2019	Tony Kart Racing Team	OK-J	ANG; QH; 18	ANG; F (14)	GEN; QH; 1	**GEN**; **F** 5	KRI; QH; 2	KRI; F 4	LEM; QH; 13	LEM; F 8	5th	51
2020	Ward Racing	OK	ZUE; QH; 3	ZUE; F 3	SAR; QH; 8	SAR; F 4	WAC; QH; 20	WAC; F (12)			4th	40

== Racing record ==
=== Racing career summary ===
Season	Series	Team	Races	Wins	Poles	F/Laps	Podiums	Points	Position
2021	Formula 4 UAE Championship	Xcel Motorsport	9	0	0	0	1	71	11th
2021	Italian F4 Championship	Van Amersfoort Racing	21	1	0	0	4	103	8th
2021	ADAC Formula 4 Championship	Van Amersfoort Racing	18	1	0	0	5	147	5th
2022	Formula 4 UAE Championship	PHM Racing	19	2	1	1	6	198	4th
2022	Italian F4 Championship	PHM Racing	20	0	0	0	2	77	12th
2022	ADAC Formula 4 Championship	PHM Racing	18	1	0	1	6	175	4th
2023	Formula Regional Middle East Championship	PHM Racing	15	2	2	0	2	78	8th
2023	FIA Formula 3 Championship	Jenzer Motorsport	18	0	0	0	2	24	18th
2023	Formula Regional European Championship	Monolite Racing	2	0	0	0	0	0	NC†
2023	Formula Regional European Championship	Van Amersfoort Racing	2	0	0	0	1	0	NC†
2024	Formula 4 UAE Championship	PHM AIX Racing	9	3	2	0	4	124	5th
2024	FIA Formula 3 Championship	AIX Racing	20	1	0	1	1	25	19th
2024	Formula Regional European Championship	MP Motorsport	14	0	0	0	0	33	16th
2024	Eurocup-3	Drivex	2	0	0	0	1	0	NC†
2024–25	Formula E	DS Penske	Development driver						
2025	Formula Regional Middle East Championship	Saintéloc Racing	6	1	0	2	4	92	11th
2025	Formula Regional European Championship	Saintéloc Racing	20	0	0	0	2	72	11th
2025	FIA Formula 3 Championship	AIX Racing	2	0	0	0	0	17	21st
2025–26	Formula E	DS Penske	Development driver						
2026	GB3 Championship	VRD Racing	23	8	7	10	15	534	1st

^{†} As Bedrin was a guest driver, he was ineligible to score points.
* Season still in progress.

=== Complete Formula 4 UAE Championship results ===
(key) (Races in bold indicate pole position) (Races in italics indicate fastest lap)

Year	Team	1	2	3	4	5	6	7	8	9	10	11	12	13	14	15	16	17	18	19	20	Pos	Points
2021	Xcel Motorsport	DUB1; 1; 8	DUB1; 2; 7	DUB1; 3; 7	DUB1; 4; 5	YMC1; 1; 8	YMC1; 2; 6	YMC1; 3; 3	YMC1; 4; 6	DUB2; 1; 5	DUB2; 2 WD	DUB2; 3 WD	DUB2; 4 WD	YMC2; 1	YMC2; 2	YMC2; 3	YMC2; 4	DUB3; 1	DUB3; 2	DUB3; 3	DUB3; 4	11th	71
2022	PHM Racing	YMC1; 1; 6	YMC1; 2; 6	YMC1; 3 Ret	YMC1; 4 DNS	DUB1; 1; 8	DUB1; 2; 11	DUB1; 3; 7	DUB1; 4; 1	DUB2; 1; 2	DUB2; 2; 2	DUB2; 3; 7	DUB2; 4; 6	DUB3; 1; 3	DUB3; 2; 6	DUB3; 3; 4	DUB3; 4; 5	YMC2; 1; 2	**YMC2**; **2**; 1	YMC2; 3 Ret	YMC2; 4; 6	4th	198
2024	PHM AIX Racing	YMC1; 1; 9	YMC1; 2; 1	YMC1; 3; 7	YMC2; 1; 3	YMC2; 2; 5	YMC2; 3; 7	DUB1; 1; 1	DUB1; 2; 5	DUB1; 3; 1	YMC3; 1	YMC3; 2	YMC3; 3	DUB2; 1	DUB2; 2	DUB2; 3						5th	124

=== Complete Italian F4 Championship results ===
(key) (Races in bold indicate pole position) (Races in italics indicate fastest lap)

Year	Team	1	2	3	4	5	6	7	8	9	10	11	12	13	14	15	16	17	18	19	20	21	22	DC	Points
2021	Van Amersfoort Racing	LEC; 1; 13	LEC; 2; 21	LEC; 3 Ret	MIS; 1; 5	MIS; 2; 10	MIS; 3 Ret	VLL; 1; 16	VLL; 2 Ret	VLL; 3; 15	IMO; 1; 2	IMO; 2; 3	IMO; 3; 1	RBR; 1 Ret	RBR; 2 Ret	RBR; 3; 17	MUG; 1; 5	MUG; 2; 6	MUG; 3; 3	MNZ; 1; 16	MNZ; 2; 10	MNZ; 3; 20		8th	103
2022	PHM Racing	IMO; 1; 3	IMO; 2; 9	IMO; 3; 6	MIS; 1; 9	MIS; 2; 9	MIS; 3; 28†	SPA; 1; 6	SPA; 2; 3	SPA; 3; 17	VLL; 1; 11	VLL; 2; 9	VLL; 3; 19	RBR; 1; 7	RBR; 2	RBR; 3; 5	RBR; 4; 7	MNZ; 1; 31†	MNZ; 2; 11	MNZ; 3 C	MUG; 1; 12	MUG; 2; 15	MUG; 3; 10	12th	77

=== Complete ADAC Formula 4 Championship results ===
(key) (Races in bold indicate pole position) (Races in italics indicate fastest lap)

Year	Team	1	2	3	4	5	6	7	8	9	10	11	12	13	14	15	16	17	18	DC	Points
2021	Van Amersfoort Racing	RBR; 1; 12	RBR; 2; 11	RBR; 3; 3	ZAN; 1; 11	ZAN; 2; 3	ZAN; 3 Ret	HOC1; 1; 7	HOC1; 2; 7	HOC1; 3; 1	SAC; 1; 7	SAC; 2; 5	SAC; 3; 3	HOC2; 1; 7	HOC2; 2 Ret	HOC2; 3; 11	NÜR; 1; 7	NÜR; 2; 6	NÜR; 3; 1	5th	147
2022	PHM Racing	SPA; 1; 8	SPA; 2; 5	SPA; 3; 8	HOC; 1 Ret	HOC; 2; 3	HOC; 3 Ret	ZAN; 1; 4	ZAN; 2; 5	ZAN; 3; 7	NÜR1; 1; 3	NÜR1; 2; 3	NÜR1; 3; 8	LAU; 1; 1	LAU; 2; 3	LAU; 3; 2	NÜR2; 1; 9	NÜR2; 2; 9	NÜR2; 3; 5	4th	175

=== Complete Formula Regional Middle East Championship results ===
(key) (Races in bold indicate pole position) (Races in italics indicate fastest lap)

Year	Entrant	1	2	3	4	5	6	7	8	9	10	11	12	13	14	15	DC	Points
2023	PHM Racing	DUB1; 1 Ret	DUB1; 2; 14	DUB1; 3; 7	KUW1; 1 Ret	KUW1; 2; 19	KUW1; 3; 8	KUW2; 1; 7	KUW2; 2 Ret	KUW2; 3; 15	DUB2; 1; 5	DUB2; 2; 19	**DUB2**; **3**; 1	ABU; 1 Ret	ABU; 2; 9	**ABU**; **3**; 1	7th	78
2025	Saintéloc Racing	YMC1; 1	YMC1; 2	YMC1; 3	YMC2; 1	YMC2; 2	YMC2; 3	DUB; 1	DUB; 2	DUB; 3	YMC3; 1; 9	YMC3; 2; 2	YMC3; 3 Ret	LUS; 1; 1	LUS; 2; 3	LUS; 3; 3	11th	92

=== Complete FIA Formula 3 Championship results ===
(key) (Races in bold indicate pole position) (Races in italics indicate fastest lap)

Year	Entrant	1	2	3	4	5	6	7	8	9	10	11	12	13	14	15	16	17	18	19	20	DC	Points
2023	Jenzer Motorsport	BHR; SPR; 16	BHR; FEA; 17	MEL; SPR; 15	MEL; FEA; 23†	MON; SPR; 15	MON; FEA; 12	CAT; SPR; 10	CAT; FEA; 11	RBR; SPR; 25	RBR; FEA; 13	SIL; SPR; 18	SIL; FEA; 17	HUN; SPR; 3	HUN; FEA; 23	SPA; SPR; 11	SPA; FEA; 3	MNZ; SPR; 15	MNZ; FEA; Ret			18th	24
2024	AIX Racing	BHR; SPR; 13	BHR; FEA; 20	MEL; SPR; 21	MEL; FEA; 8	IMO; SPR; 9	IMO; FEA; 30†	MON; SPR; Ret	MON; FEA; 24	CAT; SPR; Ret	CAT; FEA; 30	RBR; SPR; 13	RBR; FEA; Ret	SIL; SPR; 13	SIL; FEA; 9	HUN; SPR; 1	HUN; FEA; 7	SPA; SPR; 13	SPA; FEA; 20	MNZ; SPR; Ret	MNZ; FEA; 13	19th	25
2025	AIX Racing	MEL; SPR; 6	MEL; FEA; 4	BHR; SPR	BHR; FEA	IMO; SPR	IMO; FEA	MON; SPR	MON; FEA	CAT; SPR	CAT; FEA	RBR; SPR	RBR; FEA	SIL; SPR	SIL; FEA	SPA; SPR	SPA; FEA	HUN; SPR	HUN; FEA	MNZ; SPR	MNZ; FEA	21st	17

=== Complete Formula Regional European Championship results ===
(key) (Races in bold indicate pole position) (Races in italics indicate fastest lap)

Year	Team	1	2	3	4	5	6	7	8	9	10	11	12	13	14	15	16	17	18	19	20	DC	Points
2023	Monolite Racing	IMO; 1	IMO; 2	CAT; 1	CAT; 2	HUN; 1	HUN; 2	SPA; 1	SPA; 2	MUG; 1	MUG; 2	LEC; 1	LEC; 2	RBR; 1	RBR; 2	MNZ; 1	MNZ; 2	ZAN; 1; 9	ZAN; 2; 5			NC†	0
2023	Van Amersfoort Racing																			HOC; 1; 3	HOC; 2; 11	NC†	0
2024	MP Motorsport	HOC; 1; 6	HOC; 2; 8	SPA; 1	SPA; 2	ZAN; 1; 11	ZAN; 2; 9	HUN; 1	HUN; 2	MUG; 1; 8	MUG; 2; 16	LEC; 1	LEC; 2	IMO; 1 Ret	IMO; 2; 10	RBR; 1; 15	RBR; 2; 7	CAT; 1; 20	CAT; 2; 21	MNZ; 1; 17	MNZ; 2; 6	16th	33
2025	Saintéloc Racing	MIS; 1; 7	MIS; 2; 6	SPA; 1; 15	SPA; 2; 9	ZAN; 1 Ret	ZAN; 2; 10	HUN; 1 DSQ	HUN; 2 Ret	LEC; 1; 14	LEC; 2; 8	IMO; 1; 7	IMO; 2; 3	RBR; 1; 2	RBR; 2; 8	CAT; 1; 11	CAT; 2; 14	HOC; 1; 27	HOC; 2 Ret	MNZ; 1; 6	MNZ; 2 Ret	11th	72

^{†} As Bedrin was a guest driver, he was ineligible to score points.

=== Complete Eurocup-3 results ===
(key) (Races in bold indicate pole position) (Races in italics indicate fastest lap)

Year	bTeam	1	2	3	4	5	6	7	8	9	10	11	12	13	14	15	16	17	DC	Points
2024	Drivex	SPA; 1	SPA; 2	RBR; 1	RBR; 2	POR; 1	POR; 2	POR; 3	LEC; 1	LEC; 2	ZAN; 1	ZAN; 2	ARA; 1	ARA; 2	JER; 1	JER; 2	CAT; 1; 5	CAT; 2; 3	NC†	0

^{†} As Bedrin was a guest driver, he was ineligible to score points.

=== Complete GB3 Championship results ===
(key) (Races in bold indicate pole position) (Races in italics indicate fastest lap)

Year	Team	1	2	3	4	5	6	7	8	9	10	11	12	13	14	15	16	17	18	19	20	21	22	23	24	DC	Points
2026	VRD Racing	**SIL1**; **1**; 1	**SIL1**; **2**; 1	SIL1; 3; 11^{1}	SPA; 1; 2	**SPA**; **2**; 1	SPA; 3 C	HUN; 1; 2	**HUN**; **2**; 1	HUN; 3; 5^{7}	RBR; 1; 1	**RBR**; **2**; 1	RBR; 3; 2^{10}	SIL2; 1; 8	SIL2; 2; 5	SIL2; 3; 5^{1}	**DON**; **1**; 2	DON; 2 Ret	DON; 3; 16	BRH; 1; 3	BRH; 2; 3	BRH; 3; 11	**CAT**; **1**; 1	CAT; 2; 1	CAT; 3; 3^{4}	1st	534
