= Daniel Mavlyutov =

Turkish-Russian racing driver

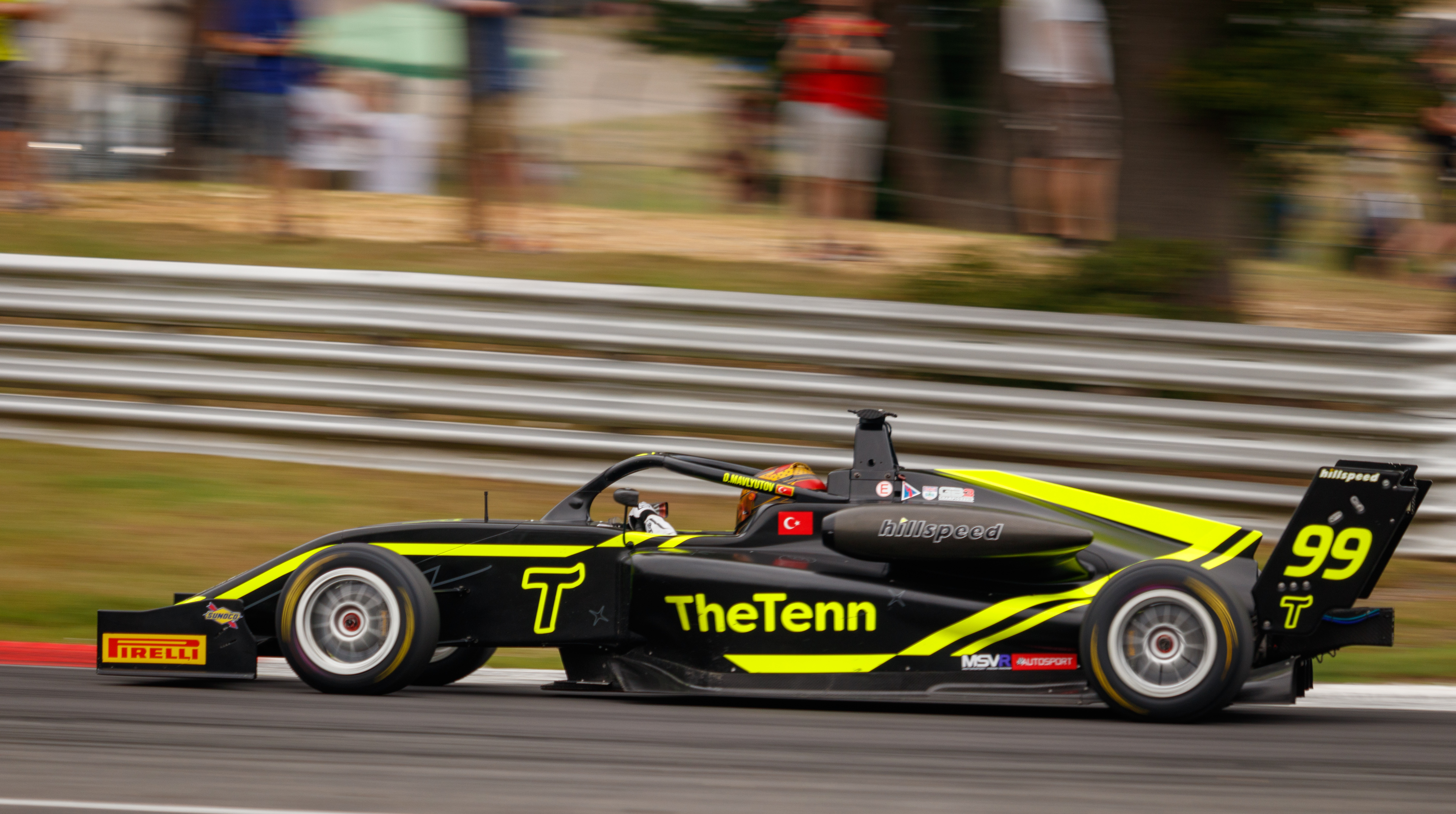
- Mavlyutov driving at Brands Hatch in 2023.
- Nationality: (Turkey) Turkish (Russia) Russian (United States) American via triple nationality
- Born: 23 February 2004 (age 22) United States

GB3 Championship career
- Debut season: 2023
- Current team: Hillspeed
- Car number: 99
- Starts: 24 (24 entries)
- Wins: 4
- Podiums: 4
- Poles: 0
- Fastest laps: 0
- Best finish: 22nd in 2023

Previous series
- 2023 2023 2022 2022 2021: GB3; FR Middle East; F4 Spanish; F4 British; Formula Ford

Daniel Mavlyutov (Russian: Мавлютов) is a Turkish-Russian racing driver who most recently competed in the 2023 GB3 Championship, driving for Hillspeed.

== Career ==
=== Formula Ford ===
Absent from karting, Mavlyutov made his racing debut at the 2021 Formula Ford Festival at Brands Hatch, before contesting the Walter Hayes Trophy, and the Champion of Brands, all with PWR1 Racing.

=== Formula 4 ===
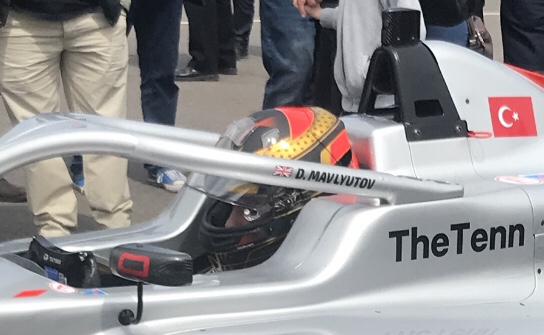
Mavlyutov at Thruxton Circuit in 2022.

On 2 February 2022, it was announced that Mavlyutov would race for Hitech Grand Prix in the 2022 F4 British Championship. He finished 15th in the overall standings with 32 points, and sixth in the rookie standings.

On 30 August 2022, it was announced that Mavlyutov would join GRS Team for the final three rounds of the 2022 F4 Spanish Championship season.

=== Formula Regional ===
==== Formula Regional Middle East Championship ====
Mavlyutov continued with Hitech Grand Prix for the 2023 Formula Regional Middle East Championship. He finished 32nd in the overall standings with a best finish of 12th place at the Yas Marina Circuit round, and came 14th in the rookie standings.

=== GB3 Championship ===
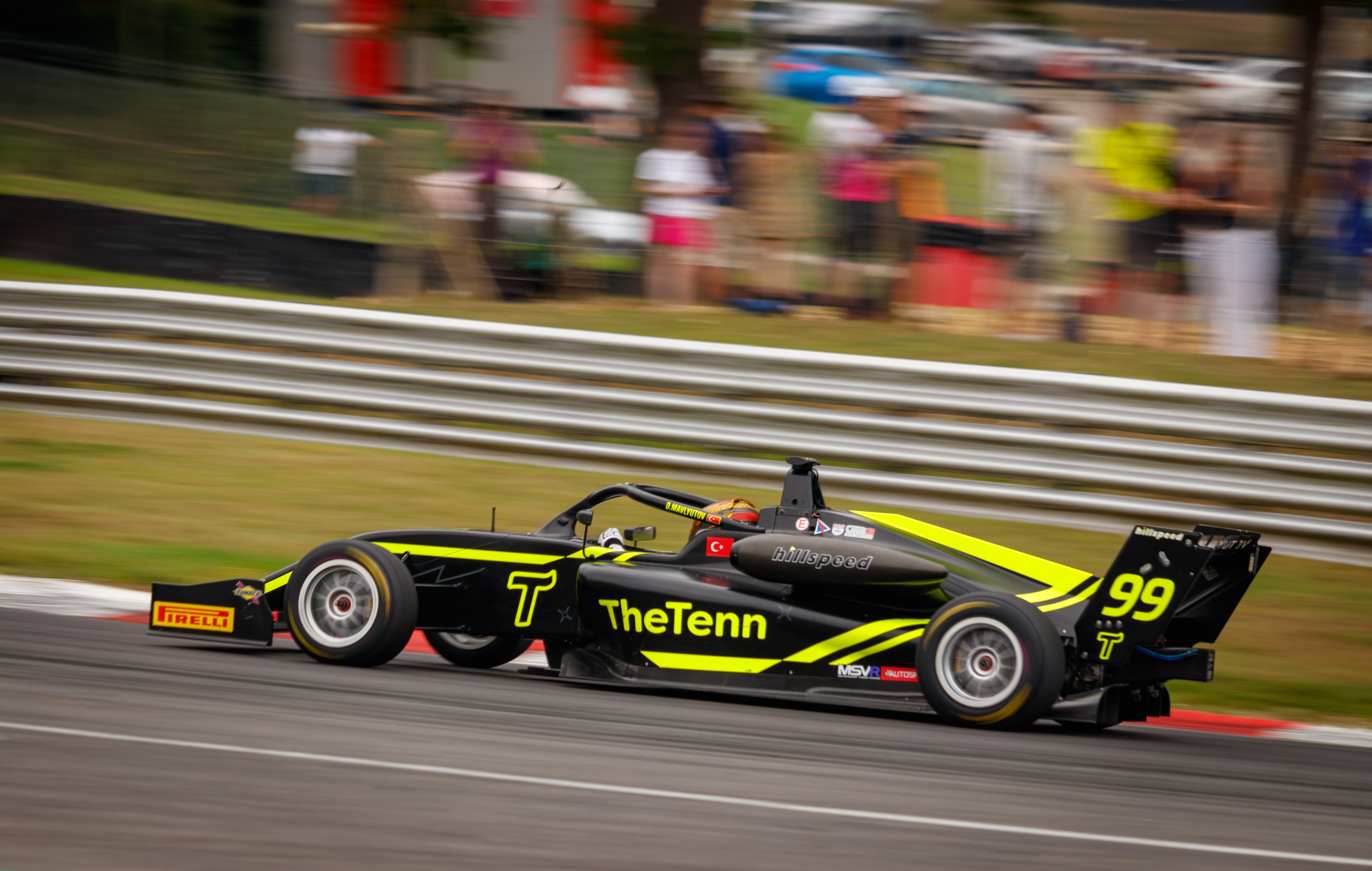
Mavlyutov driving at Brands Hatch in 2023.

On 13 February 2023, it was announced that Mavlyutov would drive alongside Gerrard Xie at Hillspeed in the 2023 GB3 Championship, both drivers supported by the new Hitech GP Academy. He achieved his debut car-racing win in the reverse-grid race during the first round at Oulton Park, where he converted pole into a race win in a mixed-conditions race mostly spent under safety car conditions. In the fourth round of the season, Mavlyutov again won the reverse-grid race from pole position, leading the race from start to finish.

== Personal life ==
Mavlyutov was born in the United States, and was raised in Turkey and the United Kingdom.

== Racing record ==
=== Racing career summary ===
Season	Series	Team	Races	Wins	Poles	F/Laps	Podiums	Points	Position
2021	50th Formula Ford Festival	PWR1 Racing	2	0	0	0	0	N/A	?
2021	Formula Ford – Walter Hayes Trophy	PWR1 Racing	2	0	0	0	0	N/A	?
2021	Formula Ford – Champion of Brands	PWR1 Racing	2	0	0	0	0	N/A	?
2022	F4 British Championship	Hitech Grand Prix	30	0	0	0	0	32	15th
2022	F4 Spanish Championship	GRS Team	9	0	0	0	0	0	36th
2023	Formula Regional Middle East Championship	Hitech Grand Prix	15	0	0	0	0	0	32nd
2023	GB3 Championship	Hillspeed	23	4	0	0	4	116	22nd
2023	Eurocup-3	GRS Team	6	0	0	0	0	0	26th

^{*}Season still in progress.

=== Complete F4 British Championship results ===
(key) (Races in bold indicate pole position) (Races in italics indicate fastest lap)

Year	Team	1	2	3	4	5	6	7	8	9	10	11	12	13	14	15	16	17	18	19	20	21	22	23	24	25	26	27	28	29	30	DC	Points
2022	Hitech Grand Prix	DON; 1; 15	DON; 2; 13^{2}	DON; 3; 14	BHI; 1; 15	BHI; 2; 13^{2}	BHI; 3; 15	THR1; 1; 16	THR1; 2; 12^{4}	THR1; 3; 13	OUL; 1; 15	OUL; 2; 13^{3}	OUL; 3; 13	CRO; 1; 16	CRO; 2; 12^{4}	CRO; 3; 12†	KNO; 1; 14	KNO; 2; 15	KNO; 3; 13	SNE; 1; 16	SNE; 2; 15^{1}	SNE; 3; 15	THR2; 1; 15	THR2; 2; 14^{3}	THR2; 3; 14	SIL; 1; 15	SIL; 2; 9^{10}	SIL; 3; 17†	BHGP; 1; 16	BHGP; 2; 15^{3}	BHGP; 3; 18	15th	32

=== Complete F4 Spanish Championship results ===
(key) (Races in bold indicate pole position) (Races in italics indicate fastest lap)

Year	Team	1	2	3	4	5	6	7	8	9	10	11	12	13	14	15	16	17	18	19	20	21	DC	Points
2022	GRS Team	ALG; 1	ALG; 2	ALG; 3	JER; 1	JER; 2	JER; 3	CRT; 1	CRT; 2	CRT; 3	SPA; 1	SPA; 2	SPA; 3	ARA; 1 Ret	ARA; 2; 22	ARA; 3 Ret	NAV; 1; 27	NAV; 2; 26	NAV; 3; 17	CAT; 1; 27	CAT; 2; 27	CAT; 3; 26	36th	0

=== Complete Formula Regional Middle East Championship results ===
(key) (Races in bold indicate pole position) (Races in italics indicate fastest lap)

Year	Entrant	1	2	3	4	5	6	7	8	9	10	11	12	13	14	15	DC	Points
2023	Hitech Grand Prix	DUB1; 1; 23	DUB1; 2; 23	DUB1; 3; 22	KUW1; 1; 16	KUW1; 2; 22	KUW1; 3; 22	KUW2; 1; 22	KUW2; 2; 19	KUW2; 3 DSQ	DUB2; 1; 21	DUB2; 2; 22	DUB2; 3 Ret	ABU; 1; 22	ABU; 2; 22	ABU; 3; 12	32nd	0

=== Complete GB3 Championship results ===
(key) (Races in bold indicate pole position) (Races in italics indicate fastest lap)

Year	Team	1	2	3	4	5	6	7	8	9	10	11	12	13	14	15	16	17	18	19	20	21	22	23	24	DC	Points
2023	Hillspeed	OUL; 1 Ret	OUL; 2; 16	OUL; 3; 1	SIL1; 1; 20	SIL1; 2; 14	SIL1; 3; 18^{3}	SPA; 1 Ret	SPA; 2; 22	SPA; 3; 17	SNE; 1; 24	SNE; 2; 18	SNE; 3; 1	SIL2; 1; 21	SIL2; 2; 21	SIL2; 3 C	BRH; 1; 20	BRH; 2; 19	BRH; 3; 1	ZAN; 1; 19	ZAN; 2; 21	ZAN; 3; 1^{1}	DON; 1; 20	DON; 2; 14	DON; 3; 19	22nd	116

* Season still in progress.

=== Complete Eurocup-3 results ===
(key) (Races in bold indicate pole position) (Races in italics indicate fastest lap)

Year	Team	1	2	3	4	5	6	7	8	9	10	11	12	13	14	15	16	DC	Points
2023	GRS Team	SPA; 1	SPA; 2	ARA; 1	ARA; 2	MNZ; 1	MNZ; 2	ZAN; 1; 13	ZAN; 2; 14	JER; 1	JER; 2	EST; 1; 15	EST; 2; 15	CRT; 1	CRT; 2	CAT; 1 Ret	CAT; 2; 15	26th	0
