= 2023 Formula Regional Middle East Championship =

Motor racing championship

The 2023 Formula Regional Middle East Championship was a multi-event, Formula Regional open-wheel single seater motor racing championship. The championship featured a mix of professional and amateur drivers, competing in Formula Regional cars. It was the inaugural season of the championship, using the venues and dates for what was originally planned to be the Formula Regional Asian Championship, with the Asian Championship then being relaunched in October of the same year.

The season was held in January and February of 2023. Andrea Kimi Antonelli won the drivers' championship in the penultimate race, and in doing so also became rookie cup winner. His team, Mumbai Falcons Racing Limited, won the teams' title.

== Teams and drivers ==
All drivers competed using identical Tatuus-built Formula Regional cars powered by a 270HP turbocharged Alfa Romeo engine. The participating teams were announced on 15 November 2022.

Team	No.	Driver	Status	Rounds
(China) / R&B Racing (Note: Cars No. 2, No. 18, No. 22 entered as R&B Racing, car No. 33 entered as R&B Racing by GRS.); (China) / R&B Racing by GRS	2	(Italy) Giovanni Maschio	R	All
(China) / R&B Racing; (China) / R&B Racing by GRS	18	(China) Cenyu Han		All
(China) / R&B Racing; (China) / R&B Racing by GRS	22	(China) Wang Zhongwei		1–3
(China) / R&B Racing; (China) / R&B Racing by GRS	22	(China) Tang Ruobin	R	5
(China) / R&B Racing; (China) / R&B Racing by GRS	33	(Bulgaria) Nikola Tsolov	R	5
(Germany) PHM Racing	5	(United Kingdom) Taylor Barnard	R	All
(Germany) PHM Racing	13	(Switzerland) Joshua Dufek		All
(Germany) PHM Racing	15	(Italy) Nikita Bedrin (Note: Smal is Russian, but he competes as a neutral competitor as Russian national emblems were banned by the FIA due to the Russian invasion of Ukraine. Bedrin, also a Russian, competes under an Italian licence for the same reason.)	R	All
(India) Mumbai Falcons Racing Limited	7	(Spain) Lorenzo Fluxá		All
(India) Mumbai Falcons Racing Limited	8	(Brazil) Rafael Câmara	R	All
(India) Mumbai Falcons Racing Limited	10	(Sweden) Dino Beganovic		1–2
(India) Mumbai Falcons Racing Limited	12	(Italy) Andrea Kimi Antonelli	R	All
(India) Mumbai Falcons Racing Limited	28	Kirill Smal	R	3–5
(France) R-ace GP	11	(Hungary) Levente Révész		All
(France) R-ace GP	34	(Italy) Francesco Braschi		1–2
(France) R-ace GP	34	(Norway) Martinius Stenshorne	R	3–5
(France) R-ace GP	47	(Singapore) Nikhil Bohra (Note: Bohra is an American-Indian driver competing under a Singaporean licence.)	R	All
(France) R-ace GP	77	(Germany) Tim Tramnitz		4–5
(France) R-ace GP	88	(Peru) Matías Zagazeta		1–3
(Netherlands) Pinnacle VAR	14	(Thailand) Tasanapol Inthraphuvasak	R	All
(Netherlands) Pinnacle VAR	23	(Spain) Pepe Martí		1–2, 4–5
(Netherlands) Pinnacle VAR	38	(Mexico) Rafael Villagómez		1–4
(Netherlands) Pinnacle VAR	50	(Japan) Ayato Iwasaki		3
(Netherlands) Pinnacle VAR	68	(Netherlands) Niels Koolen		All
(Italy) Prema Racing	24	(South Korea) Michael Shin	R	All
(Italy) Prema Racing	57	(United Kingdom) Aiden Neate	R	All
(United Kingdom) Hitech Grand Prix	52	(United States) Jak Crawford		1
(United Kingdom) Hitech Grand Prix	52	(United Kingdom) Luke Browning		2–3
(United Kingdom) Hitech Grand Prix	53	(Italy) Gabriele Minì		1–2
(United Kingdom) Hitech Grand Prix	54	(United Kingdom) Daniel Mavlyutov (Note: Mavlyutov is a Russian-Turkish driver competing under a British licence.)	R	All
(United Kingdom) Hitech Grand Prix	55	(Colombia) Sebastián Montoya		All
(Netherlands) Hyderabad Blackbirds by MP Motorsport	60	(Spain) Mari Boya		All
(Netherlands) Hyderabad Blackbirds by MP Motorsport	61	(France) Sami Meguetounif		All
(Netherlands) Hyderabad Blackbirds by MP Motorsport	62	(United States) Brad Benavides		All
(Netherlands) Hyderabad Blackbirds by MP Motorsport	63	(Denmark) Sebastian Øgaard	R	1, 4
(Netherlands) Hyderabad Blackbirds by MP Motorsport	63	(Paraguay) Joshua Dürksen		2–3
(Netherlands) Hyderabad Blackbirds by MP Motorsport	63	(France) Owen Tangavelou		5

Icon	Status
R	Rookie

- BlackArts Racing Team and BSR were among the teams announced to participate, but both withdrew their entry.
- Alex Dunne was scheduled to do a part-time campaign driving for Hitech Grand Prix, but did not enter any rounds.

== Race calendar ==
The 2023 calendar was first announced on 4 August 2022, back when the season still was to be the second season of the Formula Regional Asian Championship. With the creation of the new Middle Eastern championship, an updated calendar was also announced, replacing the first round in Abu Dhabi with another round at Kuwait Motor Town.

Round		Circuit	Date	Support bill	Map of circuit locations
1	R1	(United Arab Emirates) Dubai Autodrome, Dubai Motor City	13 January	24H GT Series (Middle East Trophy); 24H TCE Series (Middle East Trophy); Formula 4 UAE Championship; Renault Clio Cup Middle East	2023 Formula Regional Middle East Championship is located in Persian Gulf
1	R2	(United Arab Emirates) Dubai Autodrome, Dubai Motor City	14 January	24H GT Series (Middle East Trophy); 24H TCE Series (Middle East Trophy); Formula 4 UAE Championship; Renault Clio Cup Middle East	2023 Formula Regional Middle East Championship is located in Persian Gulf
1	R3	(United Arab Emirates) Dubai Autodrome, Dubai Motor City	14 January	24H GT Series (Middle East Trophy); 24H TCE Series (Middle East Trophy); Formula 4 UAE Championship; Renault Clio Cup Middle East	2023 Formula Regional Middle East Championship is located in Persian Gulf
2	R4	Kuwait Motor Town, Ali Sabah Al Salem	27 January	Formula 4 UAE Championship	2023 Formula Regional Middle East Championship is located in Persian Gulf
2	R5	Kuwait Motor Town, Ali Sabah Al Salem	28 January	Formula 4 UAE Championship	2023 Formula Regional Middle East Championship is located in Persian Gulf
2	R6	Kuwait Motor Town, Ali Sabah Al Salem	28 January	Formula 4 UAE Championship	2023 Formula Regional Middle East Championship is located in Persian Gulf
3	R7	Kuwait Motor Town, Ali Sabah Al Salem	31 January	Formula 4 UAE Championship	2023 Formula Regional Middle East Championship is located in Persian Gulf
3	R8	Kuwait Motor Town, Ali Sabah Al Salem	1 February	Formula 4 UAE Championship	2023 Formula Regional Middle East Championship is located in Persian Gulf
3	R9	Kuwait Motor Town, Ali Sabah Al Salem	1 February	Formula 4 UAE Championship	2023 Formula Regional Middle East Championship is located in Persian Gulf
4	R10	(United Arab Emirates) Dubai Autodrome, Dubai Motor City	11 February	Asian Le Mans Series; Formula 4 UAE Championship	2023 Formula Regional Middle East Championship is located in Persian Gulf
4	R11	(United Arab Emirates) Dubai Autodrome, Dubai Motor City	12 February	Asian Le Mans Series; Formula 4 UAE Championship	2023 Formula Regional Middle East Championship is located in Persian Gulf
4	R12	(United Arab Emirates) Dubai Autodrome, Dubai Motor City	12 February	Asian Le Mans Series; Formula 4 UAE Championship	2023 Formula Regional Middle East Championship is located in Persian Gulf
5	R13	(United Arab Emirates) Yas Marina Circuit, Yas Island	18 February	Asian Le Mans Series; Formula 4 UAE Championship	2023 Formula Regional Middle East Championship is located in Persian Gulf
5	R14	(United Arab Emirates) Yas Marina Circuit, Yas Island	19 February	Asian Le Mans Series; Formula 4 UAE Championship	2023 Formula Regional Middle East Championship is located in Persian Gulf
5	R15	(United Arab Emirates) Yas Marina Circuit, Yas Island	19 February	Asian Le Mans Series; Formula 4 UAE Championship	2023 Formula Regional Middle East Championship is located in Persian Gulf

== Results ==
Round		Circuit	Pole position	Fastest lap	Winning driver	Winning team	Rookie winner
1	R1	(United Arab Emirates) Dubai Autodrome	(Italy) Gabriele Minì	(Sweden) Dino Beganovic	(Sweden) Dino Beganovic	(India) Mumbai Falcons Racing Limited	(United Kingdom) Taylor Barnard
1	R2	(United Arab Emirates) Dubai Autodrome		(Italy) Andrea Kimi Antonelli	(Singapore) Nikhil Bohra	(France) R-ace GP	(Singapore) Nikhil Bohra
1	R3	(United Arab Emirates) Dubai Autodrome	(Italy) Andrea Kimi Antonelli	(Spain) Mari Boya	(Spain) Mari Boya	(Netherlands) Hyderabad Blackbirds by MP Motorsport	(Italy) Andrea Kimi Antonelli
2	R4	Kuwait Motor Town	(Paraguay) Joshua Dürksen	(Italy) Andrea Kimi Antonelli	(Sweden) Dino Beganovic	(India) Mumbai Falcons Racing Limited	(Italy) Andrea Kimi Antonelli
2	R5	Kuwait Motor Town		(Switzerland) Joshua Dufek	(United Kingdom) Taylor Barnard (Note: Joshua Dufek originally won the race, but was subsequently disqualified after his car was found not to conform with homologation requirements.)	(Germany) PHM Racing	(United Kingdom) Taylor Barnard
2	R6	Kuwait Motor Town	(France) Sami Meguetounif	(Switzerland) Joshua Dufek	(France) Sami Meguetounif	(Netherlands) Hyderabad Blackbirds by MP Motorsport	(Italy) Andrea Kimi Antonelli
3	R7	Kuwait Motor Town	(Paraguay) Joshua Dürksen	(United Kingdom) Taylor Barnard	(Italy) Andrea Kimi Antonelli	(India) Mumbai Falcons Racing Limited	(Italy) Andrea Kimi Antonelli
3	R8	Kuwait Motor Town		(Singapore) Nikhil Bohra	(Italy) Andrea Kimi Antonelli	(India) Mumbai Falcons Racing Limited	(Italy) Andrea Kimi Antonelli
3	R9	Kuwait Motor Town	(France) Sami Meguetounif	(United Kingdom) Taylor Barnard	(United Kingdom) Taylor Barnard	(Germany) PHM Racing	(United Kingdom) Taylor Barnard
4	R10	(United Arab Emirates) Dubai Autodrome	(Italy) Andrea Kimi Antonelli	(Italy) Andrea Kimi Antonelli	(Italy) Andrea Kimi Antonelli	(India) Mumbai Falcons Racing Limited	(Italy) Andrea Kimi Antonelli
4	R11	(United Arab Emirates) Dubai Autodrome		(United Kingdom) Taylor Barnard	(Spain) Pepe Martí	(Netherlands) Pinnacle VAR	(United Kingdom) Taylor Barnard
4	R12	(United Arab Emirates) Dubai Autodrome	(Italy) Nikita Bedrin	(Switzerland) Joshua Dufek	(Italy) Nikita Bedrin	(Germany) PHM Racing	(Italy) Nikita Bedrin
5	R13	(United Arab Emirates) Yas Marina Circuit	(Italy) Andrea Kimi Antonelli	(Spain) Mari Boya	(Spain) Mari Boya (Note: Andrea Kimi Antonelli originally won the race, but was given a 10 second penalty due to a collision with Taylor Barnard.)	(Netherlands) Hyderabad Blackbirds by MP Motorsport	(Brazil) Rafael Câmara
5	R14	(United Arab Emirates) Yas Marina Circuit		(Italy) Andrea Kimi Antonelli	(Spain) Pepe Martí	(Netherlands) Pinnacle VAR	(South Korea) Michael Shin
5	R15	(United Arab Emirates) Yas Marina Circuit	(Italy) Nikita Bedrin	(Italy) Andrea Kimi Antonelli	(Italy) Nikita Bedrin	(Germany) PHM Racing	(Italy) Nikita Bedrin

== Season report ==
=== First half ===
The first ever Formula Regional Middle East Championship began in the middle of January at Dubai Autodrome with Gabriele Minì and Andrea Kimi Antonelli sharing poles in qualifying. Minì kept his lead at the start of race one as Antonelli in second was overtaken by Dino Beganovic. The top pair fought for the lead all throughout the race, unbothered by two safety car interventions. A timing glitch meant the "last lap" message was shown one lap too early, and Minì's team relayed that wrong information to him. He kept Beganovic behind as the pair crossed the line, but then slowed in anticipation of the race being over. This dropped him out of contention, promoting Matías Zagazeta to second. Third was Taylor Barnard, who had a remarkable race after starting in 27th. Race two was a much calmer affair, as Nikhil Bohra took a lights-to-flag victory starting from reverse-grid pole. Aiden Neate also finished where he started, in second, and Barnard was once again third, though this time he only had to climb five spots to do so. Antonelli was unable to hold on to his race three pole position, as Mari Boya went right past him on lap one. From then on, he built a gap to Antonelli and controlled the race. The race went ahead without interruptions, and Tasanapol Inthraphuvasak completed the podium. Antonelli's consistency allowed him to take the points lead by six points over Rafael Câmara.

Up next was the first FR-level race at Kuwait Motor Town, and new arrival Joshua Dürksen started it on pole. The first corner ended with multiple crashes, Brad Benavides getting flipped on his head and riding atop Boya's car, eight retirements with the poleman among them, and a red flag. Beganovic was able to profit off of the chaos, leading the restart in first place and continuing to lead Antonelli home. Behind the pair, Barnard got past Sebastián Montoya to complete the podium. Levente Révész started race two at the front, but was unable to keep his position and soon dropped back. What followed were multiple lead changes, with Rafael Villagómez, Bohra and eventually Joshua Dufek all in the lead for some time. Dufek was able to hold on in the end, but got disqualified for a technical infringement. This promoted Barnard to the win, ahead of Bohra and Câmara. The final race had Sami Meguetounif on pole, who held off a fast-starting Dürksen at the start. Two safety car periods later, Antonelli overtook Dürksen and set off after Meguetounif, but ran out of laps to catch him. While Antonelli still had not won a race, he grew his championship lead anyway, now twelve points ahead of double-winner Beganovic.

Just three days later, racing was back on in Kuwait, and qualifying was topped by the same two drivers. Race one began with the top three drivers, all Hyderabad Blackbirds, tripping over each other into the first braking zone. This meant Dürksen lost his second pole and also allowed Antonelli through into second place, before he eventually got past Boya for the lead. He kept him behind until the Spaniard got overtaken by Câmara, and took his first win in the category. Debutant Kirill Smal started race two at the front and had to content with Dufek and Barnard, before the latter then got into the lead and built a gap. This was not to last, however, as his car then started breaking down and he fell down the order. Smal was back in the lead, but Antonelli, who had started tenth and steadily climbed up the order, made short work of his lead, overtook him and claimed another win. Smal then received a penalty, allowing Villagómez and Lorenzo Fluxá to pick up podiums. At the start of race three, Antonelli again picked up the lead, but the move was made off track, so he sped off to build a gap in anticipation of a penalty. That used up too much of his tires too soon, however, and by the end of the race he fell back into the clutches of Barnard, who overtook him to claim the win. The penalty still came for Antonelli, dropping him back behind Câmara and Fluxá. However, his double win meant he now had a 44-point lead over his nearest challenger Barnard.

=== Second half ===
The penultimate round of the season was held back in Dubai, where Antonelli and Nikita Bedrin shared poles. The former dropped down to third at the start of the first race, but was able to fight back past Barnard and Dufek into the lead through a safety car restart. His teammate Câmara followed him through, before another safety car ended the racing early. Pepe Martí was on reverse grid pole and held onto the lead as Fluxá got past Neate for second. Barnard and Antonelli, starting eighth and tenth, were soon climbing up the order. They ended up inside the top five, before Bedrin in fourth rear-ended Neate in third and both tumbled down the order. This promoted the championship protagonists to third and fourth, before Antonelli was handed a penalty for an unsafe move that dropped him to tenth. Bedrin bounced back from this incident by defending his pole position at the start of race three, while behind him his two teammates Barnard and Dufek battled with Antonelli. Three safety car periods interrupted proceedings, with the third running until the end, guaranteeing Barnard's maiden win in a PHM Racing 1-2-3. Still, Antonelli's advantage grew, albeit only by a single point to 45, with 75 points still to play for.

The final round of the championship brought the series to the Yas Marina Circuit, but the polesitters were the same as in Dubai. The two title contenders started alongside each other and had a battle that ended in tears when Antonelli rear-ended Barnard, spun him around and earned himself a ten-second penalty. This promoted Boya into the virtual lead, ahead of Meguetounif and Câmara. A late safety car meant Antonelli's penalty had the maximum effect, and both him and Barnard remained pointless. Barnard needed to score points in race two to keep his title hopes alive, but had a horrible start that dropped him out of the top 20. While he worked to get back up the order, it was Michael Shin on pole that had to contend with Smal and Martí. Eventually, the latter took the lead from Shin and led the trio home. Barnard could only manage 18th place, so Antonelli took the championship despite receiving another penalty and not scoring again. Bedrin put a close to the season by winning the third race lights-to-flag, undeterred by a red-flag disruption. Behind him, multiple fights for the podium places ended in collisions, before Antonelli moved into the lead on the final lap, but had to give the place back as the move was made off track.

== Championship standings ==
=== Scoring system ===
Points were awarded to the top ten classified drivers.

Position	**1st**	**2nd**	**3rd**	**4th**	**5th**	**6th**	**7th**	**8th**	**9th**	**10th**
Points	25	18	15	12	10	8	6	4	2	1

=== Drivers' Championship ===
Pos	Driver	DUB1 (United Arab Emirates)			KUW1 (Kuwait)			KUW2 (Kuwait)			DUB2 (United Arab Emirates)			ABU (United Arab Emirates)			Pts
Pos	Driver	R1	R2	R3	R1	R2	R3	R1	R2	R3	R1	R2	R3	R1	R2	R3	Pts
1	(Italy) Andrea Kimi Antonelli	4	6	**2**	2	Ret	2	1	1	4	**1**	10	4	**15**	13	2	192
2	(United Kingdom) Taylor Barnard	3	3	Ret	14	1	Ret	4	24†	1	3	3	2	14	18	4	152
3	(Brazil) Rafael Câmara	5	5	4	18†	3	Ret	2	Ret	2	2	23	16	3	11	3	131
4	(Spain) Lorenzo Fluxá	8	4	11	Ret	12	4	5	3	3	8	2	5	4	5	11	122
5	(Spain) Mari Boya	12	13	1	Ret	14	13	3	4	10	6	4	6	1	10	18	107
6	(Switzerland) Joshua Dufek	6	15	13	3	DSQ	10	9	7	7	4	6	3	5	4	5	105
7	(Spain) Pepe Martí	14	9	6	Ret	10	6				10	1	11	6	1	10	79
8	(Italy) Nikita Bedrin	Ret	14	7	Ret	19	8	7	Ret	15	5	19	**1**	Ret	9	**1**	78
9	(Singapore) Nikhil Bohra	10	1	10	8	2	11	19	5	11	18	13	8	7	8	Ret	73
10	(France) Sami Meguetounif	Ret	Ret	Ret	17	4	**1**	25†	12	**5**	13	18	Ret	2	Ret	Ret	65
11	(Sweden) Dino Beganovic	1	Ret	9	1	20	5										62
12	(United Kingdom) Aiden Neate	9	2	12	4	8	9	8	16	16	9	5	15	Ret	12	8	58
13	(Mexico) Rafael Villagómez	17	11	20	6	5	Ret	6	2	14	Ret	20	13				44
14	(South Korea) Michael Shin	18	18	19	5	11	Ret	18	8	17	17	16	14	10	2	9	35
15	Kirill Smal							10	20	24	12	15	7	8	3	7	32
16	(Paraguay) Joshua Dürksen				**Ret**	7	3	**26**†	15	6							29
17	(Peru) Matías Zagazeta	2	12	Ret	9	13	7	23	Ret	9							28
18	(Norway) Martinius Stenshorne							13	11	8	15	9	21†	11	7	6	20
19	(Thailand) Tasanapol Inthraphuvasak	16	10	3	DNS	16	12	11	9	21	23	14	10	16	14	20†	19
20	(Germany) Tim Tramnitz										7	7	9	21	24	Ret	14
21	(Colombia) Sebastián Montoya	15	17	18	Ret	Ret	16	12	6	13	14	8	12	12	16	21†	12
22	(Italy) Gabriele Minì	**11**	21	5	Ret	Ret	19										10
23	(Bulgaria) Nikola Tsolov													9	6	15	10
24	(Denmark) Sebastian Øgaard	7	8	17							19	17	17				10
25	(Hungary) Levente Révész	Ret	25†	14	10	6	17	14	13	12	16	12	20	17	20	Ret	9
26	(United Kingdom) Luke Browning				7	9	20	15	14	Ret							8
27	(Italy) Francesco Braschi	13	7	16	Ret	15	18										6
28	(United States) Jak Crawford	19	16	8													4
29	(United States) Brad Benavides	24	20	15	Ret	DNS	DNS	16	10	Ret	11	11	22†	18	15	13	1
30	(Italy) Giovanni Maschio	20	19	24	11	18	15	17	17	18	24†	Ret	19	24†	Ret	19†	0
31	(Netherlands) Niels Koolen	22	22	21	12	21	21	20	21	22	22	Ret	18	20	21	14	0
32	(United Kingdom) Daniel Mavlyutov	23	23	22	16	22	22	22	19	DSQ	21	22	Ret	22	22	12	0
33	(France) Owen Tangavelou													13	17	Ret	0
34	(China) Wang Zhongwei	DNS	DNS	DNS	13	23	23	24	22	23							0
35	(China) Cenyu Han	21	24	23	15	17	14	21	23	19	20	21	Ret	19	19	17	0
36	(China) Tang Ruobin													23	23	16	0
37	(Japan) Ayato Iwasaki							Ret	18	20							0
Pos	Driver	R1	R2	R3	R1	R2	R3	R1	R2	R3	R1	R2	R3	R1	R2	R3	Pts
Pos	Driver	DUB1 (United Arab Emirates)			KUW1 (Kuwait)			KUW2 (Kuwait)			DUB2 (United Arab Emirates)			ABU (United Arab Emirates)			Pts

Colour	Result
Gold	Winner
Silver	Second place
Bronze	Third place
Green	Points classification
Blue	Non-points classification
Blue	Non-classified finish (NC)
Purple	Retired, not classified (Ret)
Red	Did not qualify (DNQ)
Red	Did not pre-qualify (DNPQ)
Black	Disqualified (DSQ)
White	Did not start (DNS)
White	Withdrew (WD)
White	Race cancelled (C)
Blank	Did not practice (DNP)
Blank	Did not arrive (DNA)
Blank	Excluded (EX)

**Bold** – Pole

Italics – Fastest Lap

† – Drivers did not finish the race, but were classified as they completed more than 75% of the race distance.

=== Rookie Cup ===
Pos	Driver	DUB1 (United Arab Emirates)			KUW1 (Kuwait)			KUW2 (Kuwait)			DUB2 (United Arab Emirates)			ABU (United Arab Emirates)			Pts
Pos	Driver	R1	R2	R3	R1	R2	R3	R1	R2	R3	R1	R2	R3	R1	R2	R3	Pts
1	(Italy) Andrea Kimi Antonelli	4	6	2	2	Ret	2	1	1	4	1	10	4	15	13	2	244
2	(United Kingdom) Taylor Barnard	3	3	Ret	14	1	Ret	4	24	1	3	3	2	14	18	4	190
3	(Brazil) Rafael Câmara	5	5	4	18†	3	Ret	2	Ret	2	2	23	16	3	11	3	163
4	(Singapore) Nikhil Bohra	10	1	10	8	2	11	19	5	11	18	13	8	7	8	Ret	163
5	(United Kingdom) Aiden Neate	9	2	12	4	8	10	8	16	16	9	5	15	Ret	12	8	147
6	(Italy) Nikita Bedrin	Ret	15	7	Ret	19	9	7	Ret	15	5	19	1	Ret	9	1	133
7	(South Korea) Michael Shin	18	19	19	5	11	Ret	18	8	17	17	16	14	10	2	9	108
8	(Thailand) Tasanapol Inthraphuvasak	16	10	3	DNS	16	12	11	9	21	23	14	10	16	14	20†	84
9	Kirill Smal							10	20	24	12	15	7	8	3	7	77
10	(Norway) Martinius Stenshorne							13	11	8	15	9	21†	11	7	6	77
11	(Italy) Giovanni Maschio	20	20	24	11	18	15	17	17	18	24†	Ret	19	24†	Ret	19†	36
12	(Denmark) Sebastian Øgaard	7	8	17							19	17	17				30
13	(Bulgaria) Nikola Tsolov													9	6	15	28
14	(United Kingdom) Daniel Mavlyutov	23	23	22	16	23	22	22	19	DSQ	21	22	Ret	22	22	12	24
15	(China) Tang Ruobin													23	23	16	0
Pos	Driver	R1	R2	R3	R1	R2	R3	R1	R2	R3	R1	R2	R3	R1	R2	R3	Pts
Pos	Driver	DUB1 (United Arab Emirates)			KUW1 (Kuwait)			KUW2 (Kuwait)			DUB2 (United Arab Emirates)			ABU (United Arab Emirates)			Pts

=== Teams' Championship ===
Ahead of each event, the teams nominated two drivers that accumulated teams' points.

Pos	Team	Pts
1	(India) Mumbai Falcons Racing Limited	338
2	(Germany) PHM Racing	247
3	(Netherlands) Hyderabad Blackbirds by MP Motorsport	136
4	(Netherlands) Pinnacle VAR	124
5	(France) R-ace GP	97
6	(Italy) Prema Racing	93
7	(United Kingdom) Hitech Grand Prix	34
8	(China) R&B Racing	10
