= Tasanapol Inthraphuvasak =

Thai racing driver (born 2005)

- ทัศนพล อินทรภูวศักดิ์
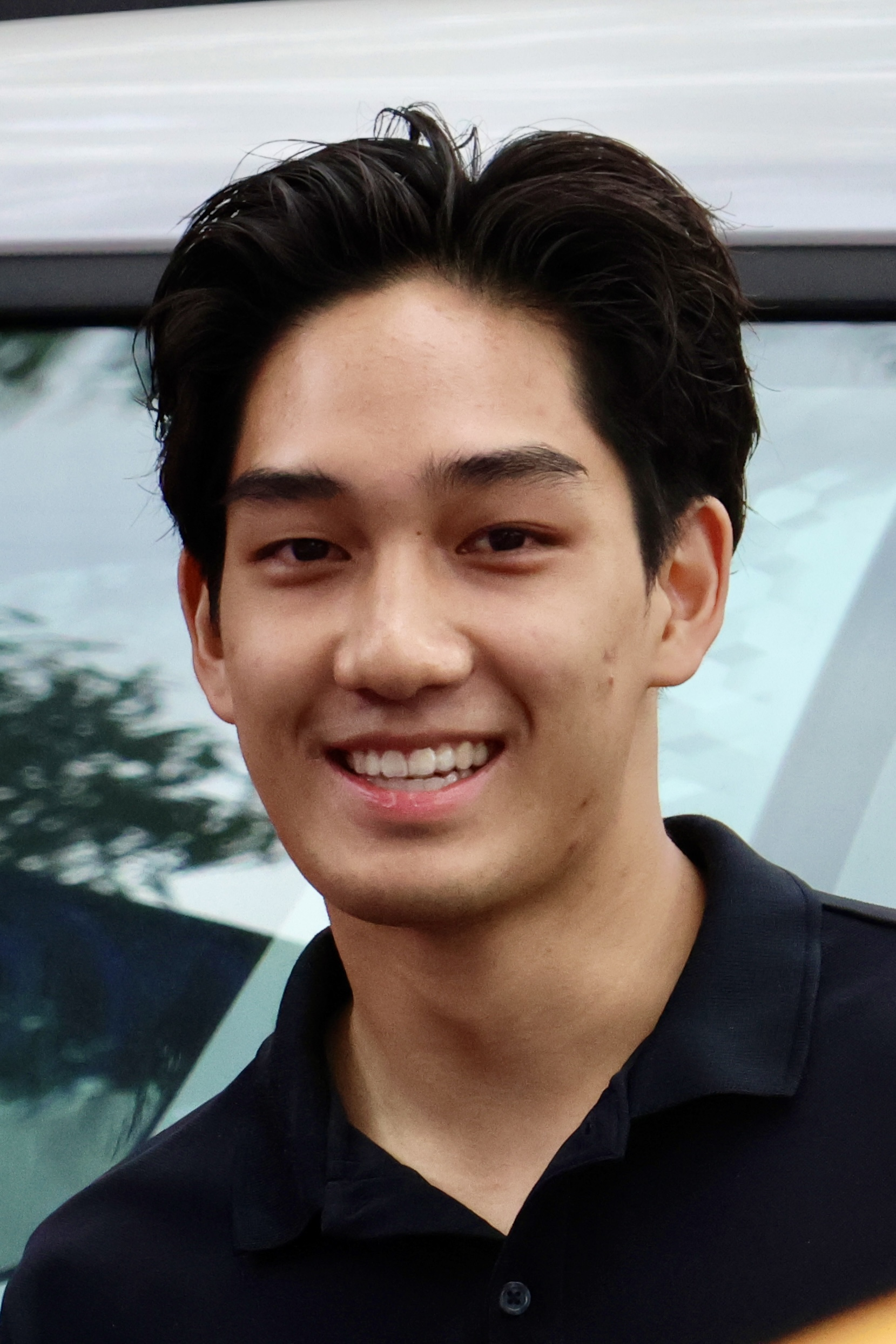
- Inthraphuvasak at the 2026 Melbourne Formula 2 round
- Born: 14 November 2005 (age 20); Bangkok, Thailand
- Parent: Vutthikorn Inthraphuvasak (father)
- Nationality: (Thailand) Thai

FIA Formula 2 Championship career
- Debut season: 2025
- Current team: ART Grand Prix
- Car number: 17
- Former teams: Trident
- Starts: 18 (20 entries)
- Wins: 0
- Podiums: 1
- Poles: 0
- Fastest laps: 0
- Best finish: 26th in 2025

Previous series
- 2024–2025; 2023; 2023–2024; 2022; 2021–2022; 2021; 2021: FIA Formula 3; Eurocup-3; FR Middle East; F4 Spanish; F4 UAE; F4 British; French F4
- Statistics up to date as of 25 August 2026.

Tasanapol "Tas" Inthraphuvasak (Thai: เติ้น ทัศนพล อินทรภูวศักดิ์ (Note: RTGS: Thatsanaphon Inthraphuwasak, pronounced [tʰát.sa.ná.pʰōn īn.tʰráʔpʰūː.wá.sàk].), born 14 November 2005) is a Thai racing driver who is currently competing in the FIA Formula 2 Championship for ART Grand Prix.

Inthraphuvasak made his car racing debut in the 2021 Formula 4 UAE Championship, and has competed in various other Formula 4 championships such as French F4, British F4 and Spanish F4, with wins in the latter two. He competed in the 2023 Formula Regional Middle East Championship with Pinnacle VAR. He progressed to FIA Formula 3 in 2024 with AIX before switching to Campos in 2025, where he took multiple wins to become the first Thai driver to win a race in the category.

== Early and personal life ==
Inthraphuvasak was born in Bangkok on 14 November 2005. His father, Vutthikorn Inthraphuvasak (b. 1974) is a GT racing driver notably known for competing in the Thailand Super Series, and is also the executive of AAS Group.

Inthraphuvasak lived in Bangkok until the age of 14, attending an international school before moving to England to pursue his racing career. He labels fellow Thai Formula One driver Alexander Albon as his racing hero.

== Career ==
=== Karting ===
Inthraphuvasak began karting in 2013, and competed in karting championships across Asia and his native Thailand until 2017, when he began karting in the United States and Europe as well. He was vice champion of the 2017 Asian Kart Open Championship and the 2018 IAME Asia Series. He competed in the OK Junior class of the 2019 FIA Karting European Championship with KR Motorsport.

=== Formula 4 ===
==== 2021 ====
Inthraphuvasak made his car racing debut in January 2021, competing in the 2021 Formula 4 UAE Championship with Xcel Motorsport. He started his single-seater career well, taking two third places in the opening two rounds. Inthraphuvasak earned another podium with second place in the second Yas Marina round; he finished fifth in the standings, having scored in every race bar one.

For his main campaign, Inthraphuvasak would drive for Carlin in the F4 British Championship. He was disqualified from race 3 at the opening round at Thruxton Circuit after failing to comply to a black and orange flag. He took his first podium during the second race in Oulton Park, and repeated this feat in Croft. Inthraphuvasak managed to take a win during the reverse-grid race at the final round at Brands Hatch. He finished tenth in the overall standings, with 123 points.

Inthraphuvasak also appeared as a guest driver at the third round of the 2021 French F4 Championship at the Hungaroring. He took two podium finishes over the weekend.

==== 2022 ====
Inthraphuvasak returned for the 2022 Formula 4 UAE Championship with MP Motorsport, for his second campaign in the series. He took pole position for race 1 in the opening Yas Marina round, and inherited the race 3 win after post-race penalties were given. He backed this by taking two podiums during the next round in Dubai. Following that, Inthraphuvasak did not stand on the podium again, but scored in six of the remaining nine races, meaning he finished seventh in the standings.

Inthraphuvasak switched to the F4 Spanish Championship, sticking with MP Motorsport. He began the season with a second place during the first race at the Algarve International Circuit. He took pole position for race 3, and converted it into a race win, his only of the season. This proved to be a false dawn for Inthraphuvasak, as he only placed in the points five more times, eventually finishing tenth in the standings with 63 points.

=== Formula Regional ===
==== 2022 ====
In late 2022, in preparation for a full Formula Regional campaign the following year, Inthraphuvasak paired up with Graff to take part in two rounds of the Ultimate Cup Series' single-seater category. The Thai starred on debut, taking pole and winning lights to flag in his first race at the Hockenheimring. He went on to win five of his six races in the championship, in a field that included Formula E race winner and former Formula One test driver Nico Prost.

==== 2023 ====
Inthraphuvasak was revealed as one of the drivers for Pinnacle VAR in the 2023 Formula Regional Middle East Championship. He finished on the podium once throughout the season, finishing in 3rd place in the third race of the first round at Dubai Autodrome. With three other points finishes during the season, he came 19th in the overall standings with 19 points, and eighth in the rookie standings.

==== 2024 ====
In 2024, Inthraphuvasak was announced to be returning to the Formula Regional Middle East Championship for the 2024 season, driving for PHM AIX Racing. He began the season with two points finishes, before taking second place during round 2 in Yas Marina. Inthraphuvasak repeated these results during the first and second Dubai Autodrome rounds, and eventually placed ninth in the standings with 86 points.

==== 2026 ====
Inthraphuvasak raced in the final round of the Formula Regional Middle East Trophy with ART Grand Prix.

=== Eurocup-3 ===
==== 2023 ====
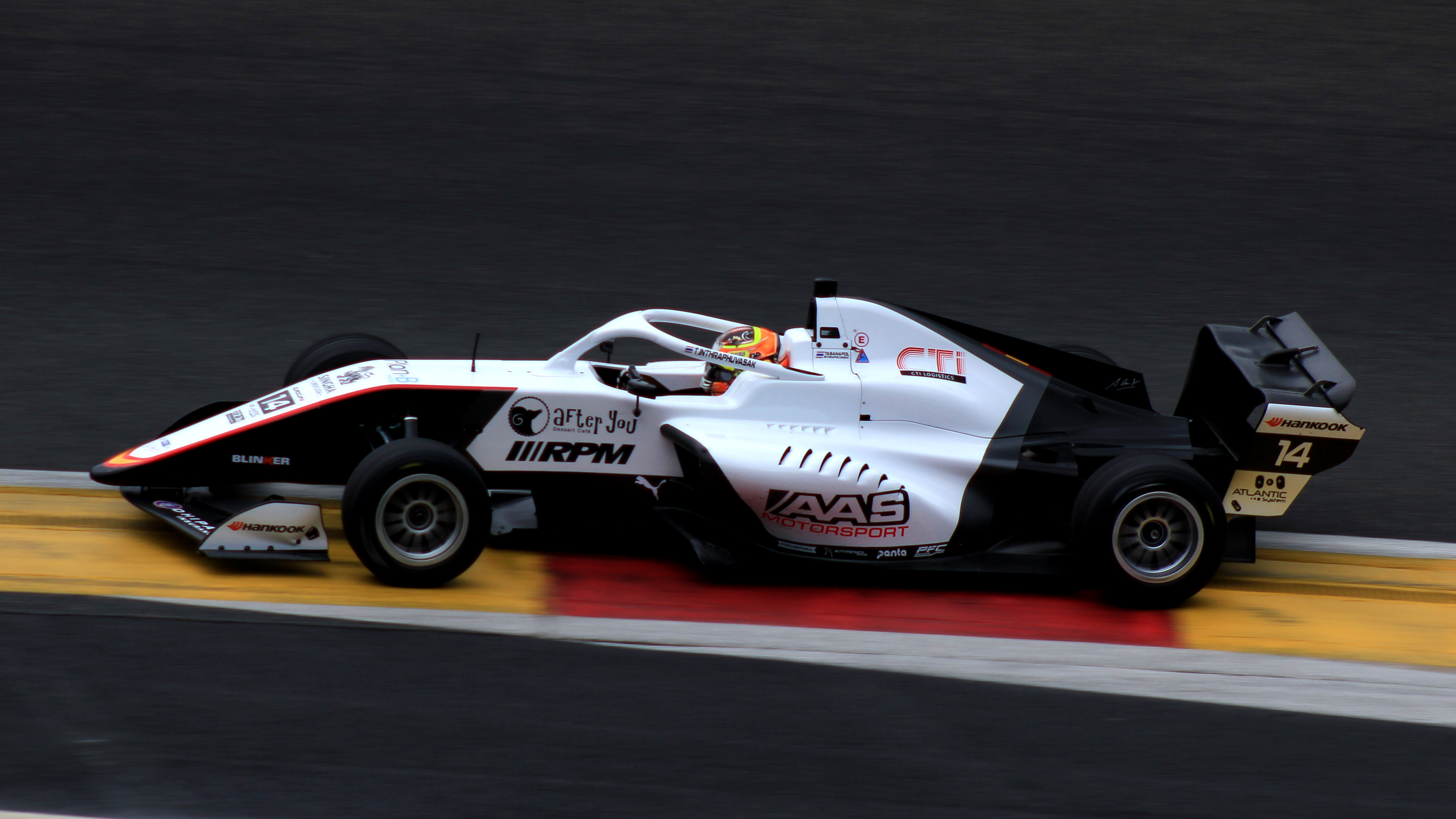
Inthraphuvasak during the 2023 Eurocup-3 race at the Circuit de Spa-Francorchamps

For his main 2023 campaign, Inthraphuvasak signed with Campos Racing to compete in the newly formed Eurocup-3 series. He picked up his first pole position not long after at the first race of the second round in MotorLand Aragón, but he retired from the race with a mechanical issue and was unable to start race two. In Circuit Zandvoort, he picked up his first podium in the first race, and picked up his second podium at the following round in Circuito de Jerez in race two. Inthraphuvasak bagged a second pole position at Circuito do Estoril, and got two second place positions in the final round in Circuit de Barcelona-Catalunya. Inthraphuvasak finished the championship sixth with 142 points.

==== 2025 ====
Inthraphuvasak competed in the first round of the 2025 Eurocup-3 Spanish Winter Championship with Campos Racing. He finished 16th in the standings with 12 points, his best finish being fourth in the third race.

=== FIA Formula 3 Championship ===
==== 2024 ====
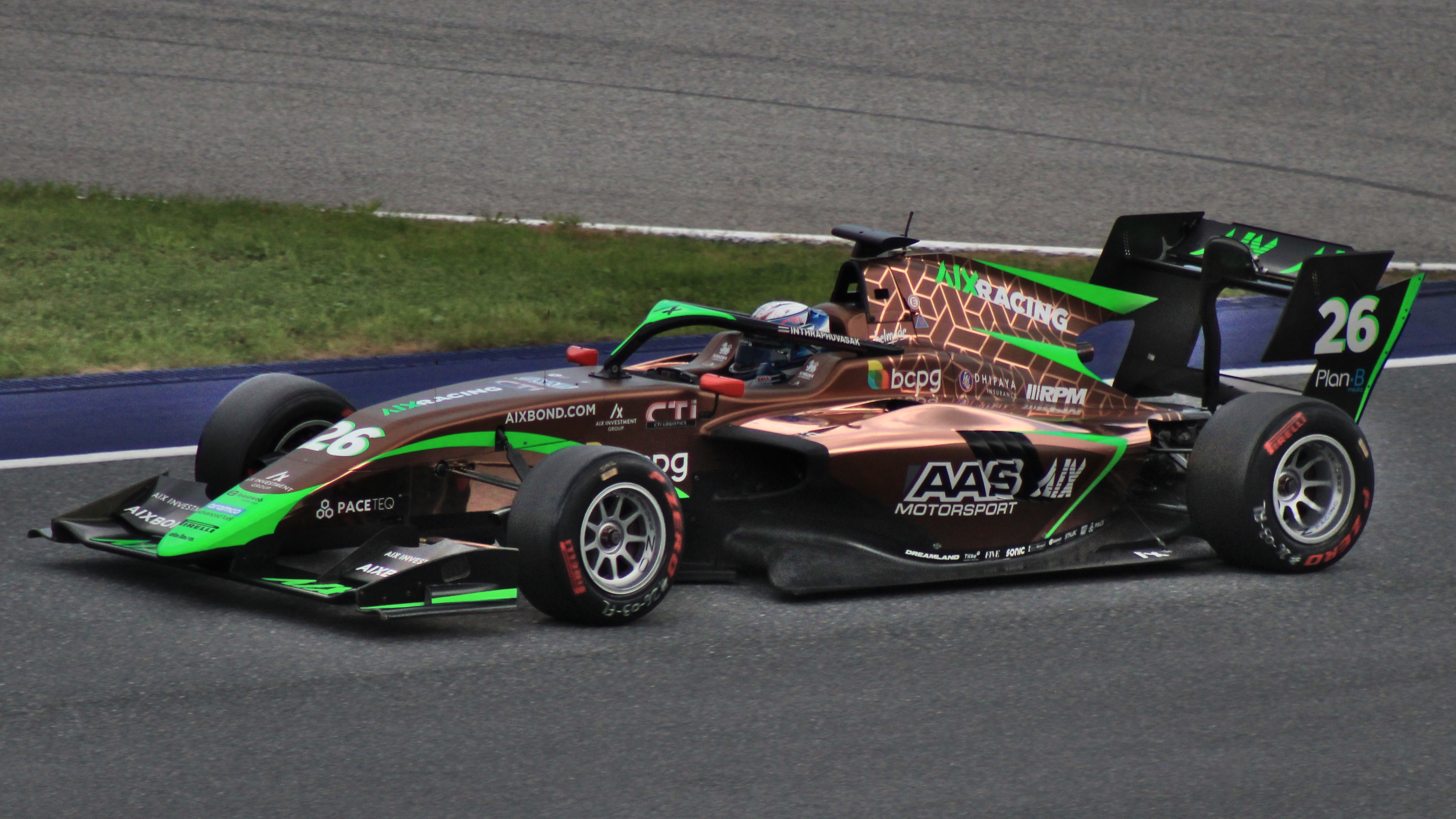
Inthraphuvasak driving the Dallara F3 2019 during the 2024 Spielberg Formula 3 round

Inthraphuvasak was promoted to FIA Formula 3 for 2024, joining AIX Racing. He had a difficult season in general as he often languished outside the points, but a breakthrough came in Hungary, qualifying tenth. Inthraphuvasak converted his third place start in the sprint to a podium in behind his winning teammate Nikita Bedrin, scoring AIX Racing's first 1-2 in Formula 3. This was Inthraphuvasak's only points finish of the season, as he finished the season 24th overall.

==== 2025 ====
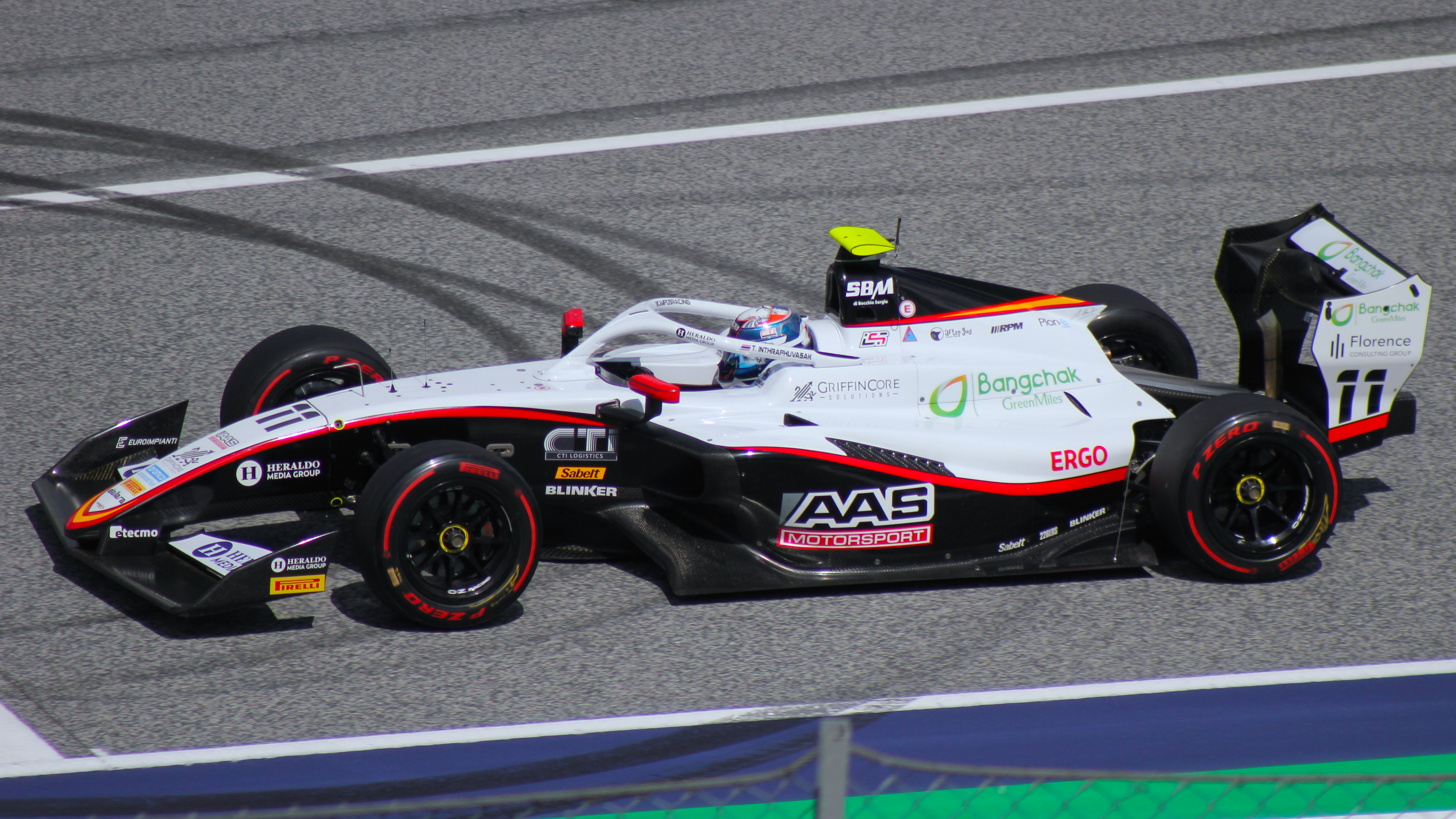
Inthraphuvasak driving the Dallara F3 2025 during the 2025 Spielberg Formula 3 round

Inthraphuvasak moved to Campos Racing for the 2025 FIA Formula 3 Championship, his sophomore season in the category. He started his season strong in Melbourne, qualifying seventh which allowed him to take a double points finish. This was followed by three scoreless events, being stopped only with a ninth place finish during the Barcelona sprint race. He then made up positions in the Austrian sprint race and finished fourth, but a slow getaway in the feature race eliminated his chances of points. Inthraphuvasak took his first Formula 3 win during the sprint race in Silverstone, having battled Théophile Naël for the lead mid-race. He looked set for more points on Sunday, but he struggled in the wet and dropped out of the points from fourth. After finishing sixth in the Spa-Francorchamps sprint race, Inthraphuvasak secured his second victory during the Budapest sprint race, leading from lights-to-flag. He finished tenth in the feature race. In Monza, Inthraphuvasak qualified a career best fourth, but was unable to score points in the sprint following an off-track excursion on the first lap. Nevertheless, he scored his first feature race win the next day, following a double pass at Rettifilo on Brad Benavides and teammate Nikola Tsolov. His late run of form leaped Inthraphuvasak to seventh in the standings with 74 points, helping Campos to clinch the teams' title for the first time in F3 history.

In November 2025, Inthraphuvasak competed in the Macau Grand Prix with Trident, finishing 16th at the end of the main race.

=== FIA Formula 2 Championship ===
==== 2025 ====
Inthraphuvasak raced in the 2025 Yas Island Formula 2 with Trident replacing one-off driver James Wharton.

==== 2026 ====
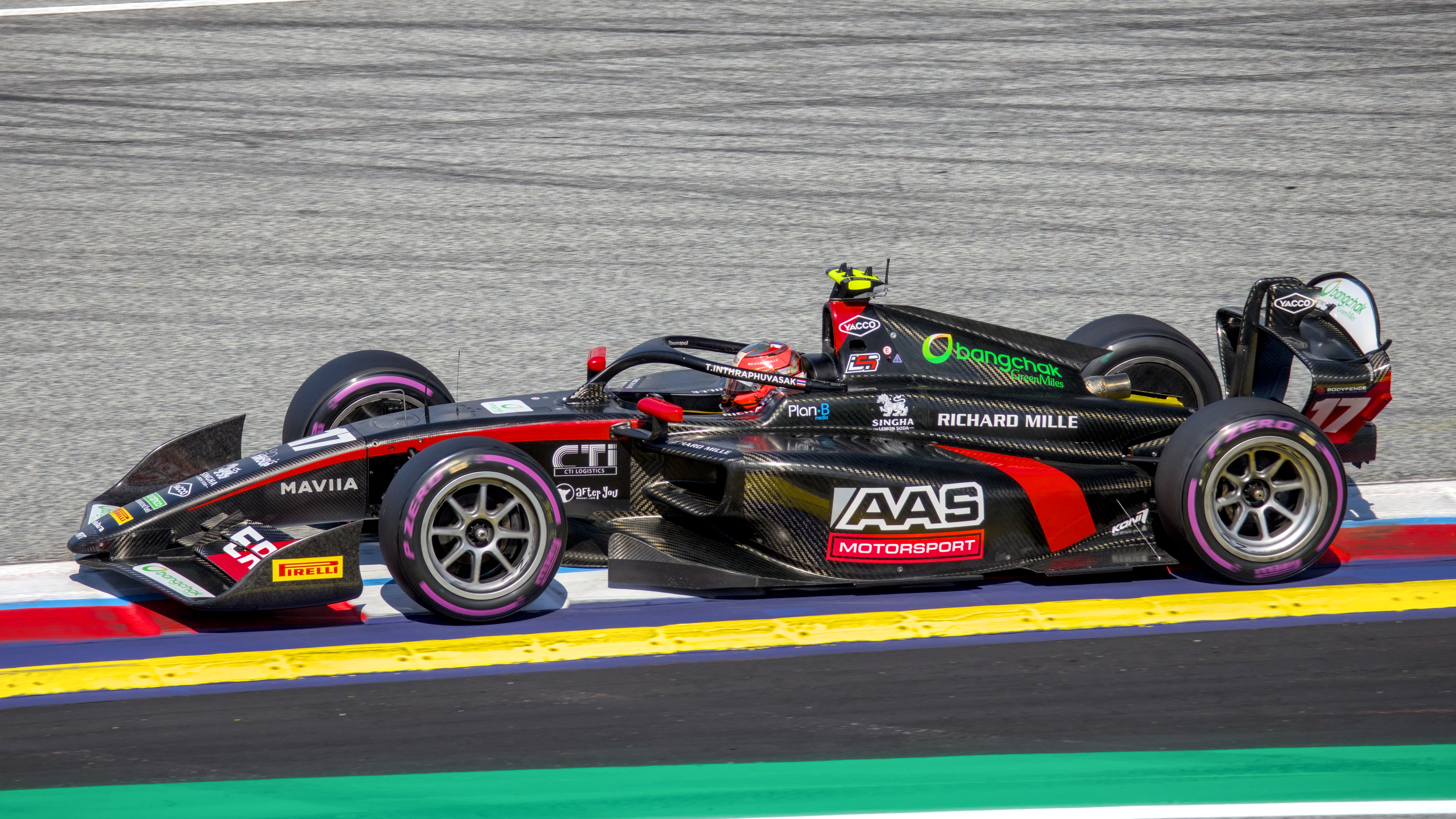
Inthraphuvasak driving the Dallara F2 2024 during the 2026 Spielberg Formula 2 round

Inthraphuvasak made his full time debut in Formula 2 in 2026 with ART Grand Prix.

== Karting record ==
=== Karting career summary ===
Season	Series	Team	Position
2015	Asian Kart Open Championship - Mini ROK		
2016	Thailand Karting Championship - Mini Kart		
2017	SKUSA SuperNationals XXI - Mini Swift		24th
2017	Trofeo Delle Industrie - 60 Mini	Gamoto ASD	11th
2017	Asian Kart Open Championship		2nd
2018	IAME Asia Series - Junior		2nd
2019	WSK Open Cup - OK Junior	KR Motorsport	73rd
2019	German Junior Kart Championship	KR Motorsport	
2019	CIK-FIA Karting European Championship - OK Junior	KR Motorsport	
2019	WSK Euro Series - OK Junior	KR Motorsport	25th
2019	WSK Super Master Series - OK Junior	KR Motorsport	
2019	South Garda Winter Cup - OK Junior	KR Motorsport	12th
2019	IAME International Final - X30 Junior		33rd
2019	IAME Euro Series - X30 Junior	Piers Sexton Racing	28th
2019	DKM German Championship		3rd
2019	IAME Asia Cup - Junior	I.S. Racing	3rd
2019	IAME Asia Final - Junior	I.S. Racing	5th
2020	South Garda Winter Cup - OK	KR Motorsport	30th
2020	WSK Super Master Series - OK	KR Motorsport	54th
2020	WSK Champions Cup - OK	KR Motorsport	26th
2020	IAME Asia Final - Senior	I.S. Racing	4th

== Racing record ==
=== Esports career summary ===
Season	Series	Team	Races	Wins	Poles	F/Laps	Podiums	Points	Position
2020	Porsche Carrera Cup Asia Virtual Edition - Pro	AAS Motorsport	6	0	0	0	1	52	10th

=== Racing career summary ===
Season	Series	Team	Races	Wins	Poles	F/Laps	Podiums	Points	Position
2021	Formula 4 UAE Championship	Xcel Motorsport	20	0	0	0	3	154	5th
2021	F4 British Championship	Carlin	30	1	0	0	3	123	10th
2021	French F4 Championship	FFSA Academy	3	0	0	0	2	0	NC†
2022	Formula 4 UAE Championship	MP Motorsport	20	1	2	1	3	163	7th
2022	F4 Spanish Championship	MP Motorsport	21	1	1	0	2	63	9th
2022	Ultimate Cup Series Challenge Monoplace - F3R	Graff	6	5	3	6	6	164	12th
2022	Thailand Super Series - GTC	AAS Motorsport	2	1	0	1	2	35	8th
2022	Thailand Super Series - GTM	AAS Motorsport	2	0	0	0	0	16	11th
2023	Formula Regional Middle East Championship	Pinnacle VAR	14	0	0	0	1	19	19th
2023	Eurocup-3	Campos Racing	15	0	2	0	4	142	6th
2023	Thailand Super Series - GT3	AAS Motorsport	2	0	0	0	1	0	NC†
2024	Formula Regional Middle East Championship	PHM AIX Racing	15	0	0	2	3	86	9th
2024	FIA Formula 3 Championship	AIX Racing	20	0	0	0	1	9	24th
2025	Eurocup-3 Spanish Winter Championship	Griffin Core by Campos	3	0	0	0	0	12	16th
2025	FIA Formula 3 Championship	Campos Racing	19	3	0	1	3	74	7th
2025	Macau Grand Prix	Trident Motorsport	1	0	0	0	0	—N/a	16th
2025	FIA Formula 2 Championship	Trident	2	0	0	0	0	0	26th
2026	Formula Regional Middle East Trophy	ART Grand Prix	2	0	0	0	0	0	28th
2026	FIA Formula 2 Championship	ART Grand Prix	14	0	0	0	1	46	10th*

* Season still in progress.
^{†} As Inthraphuvasak was a guest driver, he was ineligible to score points.

=== Complete Formula 4 UAE Championship results ===
(key) (Races in bold indicate pole position) (Races in italics indicate fastest lap)

Year	Team	1	2	3	4	5	6	7	8	9	10	11	12	13	14	15	16	17	18	19	20	Pos	Points
2021	Xcel Motorsport	DUB1; 1; 7	DUB1; 2; 8	DUB1; 3; 6	DUB1; 4; 3	YMC1; 1; 6	YMC1; 2; 7	YMC1; 3; 7	YMC1; 4; 3	DUB2; 1; 4	DUB2; 2; 7	DUB2; 3; 9	DUB2; 4; 6	YMC2; 1; 6	YMC2; 2 Ret	YMC2; 3; 10	YMC2; 4; 2	DUB3; 1; 4	DUB3; 2; 6	DUB3; 3; 10	DUB3; 4; 5	5th	154
2022	MP Motorsport	**YMC1**; **1**; 14	**YMC1**; **2**; 4	YMC1; 3; 1	YMC1; 4; 4	DUB1; 1; 2	DUB1; 2; 3	DUB1; 3; 4	DUB1; 4; 17	DUB2; 1; 6	DUB2; 2; 6	DUB2; 3; 6	DUB2; 4; 8	DUB3; 1; 5	DUB3; 2; 5	DUB3; 3 Ret	DUB3; 4; 12	YMC2; 1; 7	YMC2; 2; 8	YMC2; 3; 6	YMC2; 4; 9	7th	163

=== Complete F4 British Championship results ===
(key) (Races in bold indicate pole position) (Races in italics indicate fastest lap)

Year	Team	1	2	3	4	5	6	7	8	9	10	11	12	13	14	15	16	17	18	19	20	21	22	23	24	25	26	27	28	29	30	DC	Points
2021	Carlin	THR1; 1; 14	THR1; 2; 4	THR1; 3 DSQ	SNE; 1; 12	SNE; 2; 8	SNE; 3; 7	BHI; 1; 13	BHI; 2; 10	BHI; 3; 14	OUL; 1; 17	OUL; 2; 2^{1}	OUL; 3; 13	KNO; 1; 6	KNO; 2; 4^{4}	KNO; 3; 10	THR2; 1; 6	THR2; 2 Ret	THR2; 3; 9	CRO; 1; 10	CRO; 2; 2^{5}	CRO; 3; 6	SIL; 1; 8	SIL; 2; 5^{2}	SIL; 3; 6	DON; 1; 11	DON; 2 Ret	DON; 3; 11	BHGP; 1; 13	BHGP; 2; 1	BHGP; 3; 9	10th	123

=== Complete French F4 Championship results ===
(key) (Races in bold indicate pole position) (Races in italics indicate fastest lap)

Year	1	2	3	4	5	6	7	8	9	10	11	12	13	14	15	16	17	18	19	20	21	Pos	Points
2021	NOG; 1	NOG; 2	NOG; 3	MAG1; 1	MAG1; 2	MAG1; 3	HUN; 1; 3	HUN; 2; 4	HUN; 3; 3	LÉD; 1	LÉD; 2	LÉD; 3	MNZ; 1	MNZ; 2	MNZ; 3	LEC; 1	LEC; 2	LEC; 3	MAG2; 1	MAG2; 2	MAG2; 3	NC†	0

^{†} As Inthraphuvasak was a guest driver, he was ineligible to score points.

=== Complete F4 Spanish Championship results ===
(key) (Races in bold indicate pole position) (Races in italics indicate fastest lap)

Year	Team	1	2	3	4	5	6	7	8	9	10	11	12	13	14	15	16	17	18	19	20	21	DC	Points
2022	MP Motorsport	ALG; 1; 2	ALG; 2; 5	**ALG**; **3**; 1	JER; 1; 12	JER; 2; 8	JER; 3; 12	CRT; 1; 8	CRT; 2; 11	CRT; 3; 11	SPA; 1; 12	SPA; 2; 8	SPA; 3; 23	ARA; 1 Ret	ARA; 2; 15	ARA; 3; 17	NAV; 1 Ret	NAV; 2; 16	NAV; 3; 21	CAT; 1; 9	CAT; 2; 8	CAT; 3; 15	9th	63

=== Complete Formula Regional Middle East Championship/Trophy results ===
(key) (Races in bold indicate pole position) (Races in italics indicate fastest lap)

Year	Entrant	1	2	3	4	5	6	7	8	9	10	11	12	13	14	15	DC	Points
2023	Pinnacle VAR	DUB1; 1; 16	DUB1; 2; 10	DUB1; 3; 3	KUW1; 1 DNS	KUW1; 2; 16	KUW1; 3; 12	KUW2; 1; 11	KUW2; 2; 9	KUW2; 3; 21	DUB2; 1; 23	DUB2; 2; 14	DUB2; 3; 10	ABU; 1; 16	ABU; 2; 14	ABU; 3; 20†	19th	19
2024	PHM AIX Racing	YMC1; 1; 7	YMC1; 2; 5	YMC1; 3 Ret	YMC2; 1; 9	YMC2; 2; 2	YMC2; 3; 14	DUB1; 1; 8	DUB1; 2; 2	DUB1; 3; 8	YMC3; 1; 15	YMC3; 2; 13	YMC3; 3; 8	DUB2; 1; 9	DUB2; 2; 2	DUB2; 3 Ret	9th	86
2026	ART Grand Prix	YMC1; 1	YMC1; 2	YMC1; 3	YMC2; 1	YMC2; 2	YMC2; 3	DUB; 1	DUB; 2	DUB; 3	LUS; 1; 28	LUS; 2 C	LUS; 3; 12				28th	0

=== Complete Eurocup-3 results ===
(key) (Races in bold indicate pole position) (Races in italics indicate fastest lap)

Year	Team	1	2	3	4	5	6	7	8	9	10	11	12	13	14	15	16	DC	Points
2023	Campos Racing	SPA; 1; 10	SPA; 2; 5	**ARA**; **1** Ret	ARA; 2 DNS	MNZ; 1; 5	MNZ; 2; 7	ZAN; 1; 3	ZAN; 2; 4	JER; 1 Ret	JER; 2; 3	EST; 1; 10	**EST**; **2**; 4	CRT; 1; 4	CRT; 2; 6	CAT; 1; 2	CAT; 2; 2	6th	142

=== Complete FIA Formula 3 Championship results ===
(key) (Races in bold indicate pole position) (Races in italics indicate fastest lap)

Year	Entrant	1	2	3	4	5	6	7	8	9	10	11	12	13	14	15	16	17	18	19	20	DC	Points
2024	PHM AIX Racing AIX Racing	BHR; SPR; 16	BHR; FEA; 19	MEL; SPR; Ret	MEL; FEA; Ret	IMO; SPR; Ret	IMO; FEA; 28	MON; SPR; 17	MON; FEA; 18	CAT; SPR; 25	CAT; FEA; 26	RBR; SPR; 27	RBR; FEA; 26	SIL; SPR; 20	SIL; FEA; 20	HUN; SPR; 2	HUN; FEA; 14	SPA; SPR; 29	SPA; FEA; 15	MNZ; SPR; 21	MNZ; FEA; 11	24th	9
2025	Campos Racing	MEL; SPR; 4	MEL; FEA; 7	BHR; SPR; 18	BHR; FEA; 16	IMO; SPR; 19	IMO; FEA; 17	MON; SPR; 23	MON; FEA; 12	CAT; SPR; 9	CAT; FEA; 11	RBR; SPR; 4	RBR; FEA; 15	SIL; SPR; 1	SIL; FEA; 13	SPA; SPR; 6	SPA; FEA; C	HUN; SPR; 1	HUN; FEA; 10	MNZ; SPR; 12	MNZ; FEA; 1	7th	74

=== Complete Eurocup-3 Spanish Winter Championship results ===
(key) (Races in bold indicate pole position) (Races in italics indicate fastest lap)

Year	Team	1	2	3	4	5	6	7	8	DC	Points
2025	Campos Racing	JER; 1; 11	JER; 2; 12	JER; 3; 4	POR; 1	POR; 2	POR; 3	ARA; 1	ARA; 2	16th	12

=== Complete Macau Grand Prix results ===
Year	Team	Car	Qualifying	Quali Race	Main race
2025	(Italy) Trident	Tatuus F3 T-318	12th	13th	16th

=== Complete FIA Formula 2 Championship results ===
(key) (Races in bold indicate pole position) (Races in italics indicate fastest lap)

Year	Entrant	1	2	3	4	5	6	7	8	9	10	11	12	13	14	15	16	17	18	19	20	21	22	23	24	25	26	27	28	29	DC	Points
2025	Trident	MEL; SPR	MEL; FEA	BHR; SPR	BHR; FEA	JED; SPR	JED; FEA	IMO; SPR	IMO; FEA	MON; SPR	MON; FEA	CAT; SPR	CAT; FEA	RBR; SPR	RBR; FEA	SIL; SPR	SIL; FEA	SPA; SPR	SPA; FEA	HUN; SPR	HUN; FEA	MNZ; SPR	MNZ; FEA	BAK; SPR	BAK; FEA	LSL; SPR	LSL; FEA	YMC; SPR; 18	YMC; FEA; 17		26th	0
2026	ART Grand Prix	MEL; SPR; 4	MEL; FEA; 6	MIA; SPR; Ret	MIA; FEA; 15	MTL; SPR; WD	MTL; FEA; WD	MON; SPR; NC	MON; FEA; 13	CAT; SPR; 9	CAT; FEA; 12	RBR; SPR; Ret	RBR; FEA; 5	SIL; SPR; 5	SIL; FEA; 10	SPA; SPR; 12	SPA; FEA; 2	HUN; SPR; 6	HUN; FEA; 5	MNZ; SPR; 19	MNZ; FEA; 8	MAD; SPR; 15	MAD; FEA; 6	BAK; SPR; 11	BAK; FEA1; 11	BAK; FEA2; Ret	LSL; SPR	LSL; FEA	YMC; SPR	YMC; FEA	11th*	71*

* Season still in progress.
