= 2026 Spa-Francorchamps Formula 2 round =

Motor racing event

(Belgium) 2026 Spa-Francorchamps Formula 2 round
Round details
- Round 8 of 14 in the 2026 FIA Formula 2 Championship.
- Location: Circuit de Spa-Francorchamps; Stavelot, Belgium
- Course: Permanent racing facility 7.004 km (4.352 mi)

Sprint Race
- Date: 18 July 2026
- Laps: 18
Podium
First	(Paraguay) Joshua Dürksen	Invicta Racing
Second	(Norway) Martinius Stenshorne	Rodin Motorsport
Third	(Sweden) Dino Beganovic	DAMS Lucas Oil
Fastest lap
Driver	(Norway) Martinius Stenshorne	Rodin Motorsport
- Time: 1:59.985 (on lap 4)

Feature Race
- Date: 19 July 2026
- Laps: 25
Pole position
Driver	(Brazil) Rafael Câmara	Invicta Racing
Time	1:56.306	
Podium
First	(Brazil) Rafael Câmara	Invicta Racing
Second	(Thailand) Tasanapol Inthraphuvasak	ART Grand Prix
Third	(Bulgaria) Nikola Tsolov	Campos Racing
Fastest lap
Driver	(Brazil) Rafael Câmara	Invicta Racing
- Time: 1:59.308 (on lap 16)

The 2026 Spa-Francorchamps FIA Formula 2 round was a motor racing event held between 17 and 19 July 2026 at the Circuit de Spa-Francorchamps. It was the eighth round of the 2026 FIA Formula 2 Championship and was held in support of the 2026 Belgian Grand Prix.

== Classification ==
=== Qualifying ===
Qualifying was held on 17 July 2026 at 16:00 local time (UTC+2).

Pos.	No.	Driver	Entrant	Time/Gap	Grid SR	Grid FR
1	1	(Brazil) Rafael Câmara	Invicta Racing	1:56.306	10	1
2	17	(Thailand) Tasanapol Inthraphuvasak	ART Grand Prix	+0.039	9	2
3	15	(Republic of Ireland) Alex Dunne	Rodin Motorsport	+0.186	8	3
4	6	(Bulgaria) Nikola Tsolov	Campos Racing	+0.393	7	4
5	25	(United Kingdom) John Bennett	Trident	+0.453	6	5
6	7	(Sweden) Dino Beganovic	DAMS Lucas Oil	+0.501	5	6
7	2	(Paraguay) Joshua Dürksen	Invicta Racing	+0.516	4	7
8	8	(Poland) Roman Bilinski	DAMS Lucas Oil	+0.553	3	8
9	14	(Norway) Martinius Stenshorne	Rodin Motorsport	+0.566	2	9
10	11	(Colombia) Sebastián Montoya	Prema Racing	+0.612	1	10
11	22	(Argentina) Nico Varrone	Van Amersfoort Racing	+0.712	11	11
12	16	(India) Kush Maini	ART Grand Prix	+0.779	12	12
13	10	(Germany) Oliver Goethe	MP Motorsport	+0.788	13	13
14	20	(Brazil) Emerson Fittipaldi Jr.	AIX Racing	+0.964	20^{1}	20^{1}
15	23	(Mexico) Rafael Villagómez	Van Amersfoort Racing	+1.030	19^{2}	19^{2}
16	9	(Italy) Gabriele Minì	MP Motorsport	+1.089	14	14
17	4	(United States) Colton Herta	Hitech	+1.203	15	15
18	24	(Netherlands) Laurens van Hoepen	Trident	+1.535	16	16
19	21	(United Kingdom) Cian Shields	AIX Racing	+1.767	21^{1}	21^{1}
20	12	(Spain) Mari Boya	Prema Racing	+2.222	17	17
21	3	(Japan) Ritomo Miyata	Hitech	+2.989	18	18
107% time: 2:04.447 (+8.141)
—	5	(Mexico) Noel León	Campos Racing	No time^{3}	22	22

Notes:

- ^1 – Both Emerson Fittipaldi Jr. and Cian Shields received a ten-place grid penalty for both races due to failing to reduce speed under double yellow flags. The penalty dropped Fittipaldi Jr. from 14th to 20th and Shields from 19th to 21st on both grids.
- ^2 – Rafael Villagómez received a five-place grid penalty for both races due to failing to reduce speed under a yellow flag. This dropped him from 15th to 19th on both grids.
- ^3 – Noel León had all his qualifying lap times deleted due to being the sole cause of a red flag. Having failed to set a time within 107% of the fastest driver, he was permitted by the stewards to start both races from the back of the grid.

=== Sprint race ===
The sprint race was held on 18 July 2026 at 14:15 local time (UTC+2).

Pos.	No.	Driver	Entrant	Laps	Time/Retired	Grid	Points
1	2	(Paraguay) Joshua Dürksen	Invicta Racing	18	41:53.482	4	10
2	14	(Norway) Martinius Stenshorne	Rodin Motorsport	18	+0.606	2	8+1
3	7	(Sweden) Dino Beganovic	DAMS Lucas Oil	18	+1.273	5	6
4	6	(Bulgaria) Nikola Tsolov	Campos Racing	18	+1.798	7	5
5	15	(Republic of Ireland) Alex Dunne	Rodin Motorsport	18	+3.357	8	4
6	1	(Brazil) Rafael Câmara	Invicta Racing	18	+4.054	10	3
7	8	(Poland) Roman Bilinski	DAMS Lucas Oil	18	+4.607	3	2
8	10	(Germany) Oliver Goethe	MP Motorsport	18	+5.173	13	1
9	11	(Colombia) Sebastián Montoya	Prema Racing	18	+5.867	1	
10	24	(Netherlands) Laurens van Hoepen	Trident	18	+6.236	16	
11	12	(Spain) Mari Boya	Prema Racing	18	+6.688	17	
12	17	(Thailand) Tasanapol Inthraphuvasak	ART Grand Prix	18	+7.141	9	
13	4	(United States) Colton Herta	Hitech	18	+7.524	15	
14	20	(Brazil) Emerson Fittipaldi Jr.	AIX Racing	18	+8.057	20	
15	16	(India) Kush Maini	ART Grand Prix	18	+8.222	12	
16	23	(Mexico) Rafael Villagómez	Van Amersfoort Racing	18	+8.812	19	
17	3	(Japan) Ritomo Miyata	Hitech	18	+19.066^{1}	18	
NC	22	(Argentina) Nico Varrone	Van Amersfoort Racing	14	+4 laps	11	
DNF	25	(United Kingdom) John Bennett	Trident	12	Spun out	6	
DNF	9	(Italy) Gabriele Minì	MP Motorsport	11	Mechanical issue	14	
DNF	5	(Mexico) Noel León	Campos Racing	6	Mechanical	22	
DNF	21	(United Kingdom) Cian Shields	AIX Racing	5	Accident	21	
Fastest lap: (Norway) Martinius Stenshorne (1:59.985 on lap 4)

Notes:

- ^1 – Ritomo Miyata received a ten-second time penalty for exceeding track limits on five occasions.

=== Feature race ===
The feature race was held on 19 July 2026 at 10:00 local time (UTC+2).

Pos.	No.	Driver	Entrant	Laps	Time/Retired	Grid	Points
1	1	(Brazil) Rafael Câmara	Invicta Racing	21	1:11:20.230	1	25+1+2
2	17	(Thailand) Tasanapol Inthraphuvasak	ART Grand Prix	21	+5.458	2	18
3	6	(Bulgaria) Nikola Tsolov	Campos Racing	21	+7.463	4	15
4	15	(Republic of Ireland) Alex Dunne	Rodin Motorsport	21	+7.882^{1}	3	12
5	9	(Italy) Gabriele Minì	MP Motorsport	21	+8.179	14	10
6	23	(Mexico) Rafael Villagómez	Van Amersfoort Racing	21	+10.972	19	8
7	4	(United States) Colton Herta	Hitech	21	+20.377^{1}	15	6
8	3	(Japan) Ritomo Miyata	Hitech	21	+21.887	18	4
9	12	(Spain) Mari Boya	Prema Racing	21	+23.657	17	2
10	14	(Norway) Martinius Stenshorne	Rodin Motorsport	21	+24.622	9	1
11	11	(Colombia) Sebastián Montoya	Prema Racing	21	+25.335	10	
12	21	(United Kingdom) Cian Shields	AIX Racing	21	+31.803^{1}	21	
13	22	(Argentina) Nico Varrone	Van Amersfoort Racing	21	+35.631	11	
14	2	(Paraguay) Joshua Dürksen	Invicta Racing	21	+42.458	7	
15	25	(United Kingdom) John Bennett	Trident	21	+50.247	5	
16	16	(India) Kush Maini	ART Grand Prix	21	+58.970^{1}	12	
DNF	8	(Poland) Roman Bilinski	DAMS Lucas Oil	16	Collision Damage	8	
DNF	20	(Brazil) Emerson Fittipaldi Jr.	AIX Racing	12	Accident	20	
DNF	24	(Netherlands) Laurens van Hoepen	Trident	7	Accident	16	
DNF	7	(Sweden) Dino Beganovic	DAMS Lucas Oil	0	Retired	6	
DNF	10	(Germany) Oliver Goethe	MP Motorsport	0	Collision	13	
DSQ	5	(Mexico) Noel León	Campos Racing	DSQ	Disqualified^{2}	22	
Fastest lap: (Brazil) Rafael Câmara (1:59.308 on lap 16)

Notes:

- ^1 – Alex Dunne, Colton Herta, Cian Shields, and Kush Maini all received a five-second time penalty for exceeding track limits.
- ^2 – Noel León originally finished seventh but was disqualified due to a breach of non-operational personnel regulations, as a non-operational person had used a headset with a microphone in the pitlane during a red flag.

== Standings after the event ==
Drivers' Championship standings

Pos.	Driver	Points
1	(Bulgaria) Nikola Tsolov	161
2	(Italy) Gabriele Minì	134
3	(Brazil) Rafael Câmara	125
4	(Republic of Ireland) Alex Dunne	108
5	(Mexico) Noel León	69

Teams' Championship standings

	Pos.	Team	Points
	1	(Spain) Campos Racing	230
1	2	(New Zealand) Rodin Motorsport	166
1	3	(Netherlands) MP Motorsport	163
	4	(United Kingdom) Invicta Racing	161
	5	(France) ART Grand Prix	109

Note: Only the top five positions are included for both sets of standings.

== See also ==
- 2026 Belgian Grand Prix
- 2026 Spa-Francorchamps Formula 3 round

Previous round: 2026 Silverstone Formula 2 round	FIA Formula 2 Championship; 2026 season	Next round: 2026 Budapest Formula 2 round
Previous round: 2025 Spa-Francorchamps Formula 2 round	Spa-Francorchamps Formula 2 round	Next round: 2027 Spa-Francorchamps Formula 2 round
