= 2025 Baku Formula 2 round =

Motor racing event

(Azerbaijan) 2025 Baku Formula 2 round
Round details
- Round 12 of 14 in the 2025 FIA Formula 2 Championship.
- Layout of Baku City Circuit
- Location: Baku City Circuit; Baku, Azerbaijan
- Course: Street Circuit; 6.003 km (3.730 mi)

Sprint Race
- Date: 20 September 2025
- Laps: 21
Podium
First	(Sweden) Dino Beganovic	Hitech TGR
Second	(United Kingdom) Luke Browning	Hitech TGR
Third	(Republic of Ireland) Alex Dunne	Rodin Motorsport
Fastest lap
Driver	(Sweden) Dino Beganovic	Hitech TGR
- Time: 1:56.561 (on lap 15)

Feature Race
- Date: 21 September 2025
- Laps: 29
Pole position
Driver	(United States) Jak Crawford	DAMS Lucas Oil
Time	1:54.791	
Podium
First	(United States) Jak Crawford	DAMS Lucas Oil
Second	(Paraguay) Joshua Dürksen	AIX Racing
Third	(Sweden) Dino Beganovic	Hitech TGR
Fastest lap
Driver	(Paraguay) Joshua Dürksen	AIX Racing
- Time: 1:56.794 (on lap 11)

The 2025 Baku Formula 2 round was a motor racing event held between 19 and 21 September 2025 at the Baku City Circuit in Baku, Azerbaijan. It was the twelfth round of the 2025 Formula 2 Championship and was held in support of the 2025 Azerbaijan Grand Prix.

== Classification ==
=== Qualifying ===
Qualifying was held on 19 September 2025 at 14:00 local time (UTC+4).

Pos.	No.	Driver	Entrant	Time/Gap	Grid SR	Grid FR
1	11	(United States) Jak Crawford	DAMS Lucas Oil	1:54.791	10	1
2	1	(Italy) Leonardo Fornaroli	Invicta Racing	+0.019	9	2
3	10	(Italy) Gabriele Minì	Prema Racing	+0.399	8	3
4	17	(Republic of Ireland) Alex Dunne	Rodin Motorsport	+0.778	7	4
5	7	(United Kingdom) Luke Browning	Hitech TGR	+0.778	6	5
6	3	(Spain) Pepe Martí	Campos Racing	+0.785	5	6
7	23	(Norway) Martinius Stenshorne	Trident	+0.847	4	7
8	9	(Colombia) Sebastián Montoya	Prema Racing	+1.018	3	8
9	8	(Sweden) Dino Beganovic	Hitech TGR	+1.128	2	9
10	25	(Mexico) Rafael Villagómez	Van Amersfoort Racing	+1.141	1	10
11	6	(Netherlands) Richard Verschoor	MP Motorsport	+1.192	11	11
12	2	(Czech Republic) Roman Staněk	Invicta Racing	+1.194^{1}	17^{1}	17^{1}
13	14	(France) Victor Martins	ART Grand Prix	+1.387^{2}	12	12
14	20	(Paraguay) Joshua Dürksen	AIX Racing	+1.400	15^{3}	15^{3}
15	24	(United Kingdom) John Bennett	Van Amersfoort Racing	+1.563	13	13
16	12	(India) Kush Maini	DAMS Lucas Oil	+1.699	14	19^{4}
17	4	(United Kingdom) Arvid Lindblad	Campos Racing	+1.836	21^{5}	14
18	5	(Germany) Oliver Goethe	MP Motorsport	+1.895	16	16
19	15	(Japan) Ritomo Miyata	ART Grand Prix	+2.375	18	18
20	22	(Netherlands) Laurens van Hoepen	Trident	+2.513	19	20
21	21	(United Kingdom) Cian Shields	AIX Racing	+2.859	20	21
107% time: 2:02.826
—	16	(Belgium) Amaury Cordeel	Rodin Motorsport	No time^{6}	22	22

Notes:

- ^1 Roman Staněk had his fastest time deleted for being the sole cause of a red flag after he collided with John Bennett when returning to the track. This demoted him from 9th to 12th. Additionally, Staněk received a five-place grid penalty in both races for causing a collision with Bennett. This demoted him from 12th to 17th on the grid.
- ^2 Victor Martins had his fastest lap time deleted for being the sole cause of a red flag after losing control and crashing at turn 3. This demoted him from 4th to 13th.
- ^3 Joshua Dürksen was handed a one-place grid penalty for rejoining the track in an unsafe manner and impeding Laurens van Hoepen. This demoted him from 14th to 15th on the grid for both races.
- ^4 Kush Maini was given a five-second time penalty in the sprint race for causing a collision with Amaury Cordeel. Because Maini did not classify in the sprint, this converted into a three-place grid penalty for the feature race, dropping him from 16th to 19th.
- ^5 Arvid Lindblad received two ten-second time penalties during the Monza feature race, both for causing a collision. Because Lindblad failed to classify at Monza, the penalties converted into two five-place grid penalties for the Baku sprint race. This dropped him from 17th to 21st on the grid.
- ^6 Amaury Cordeel had his fastest lap time deleted for being the sole cause of a red flag after he crashed at turn 13. Cordeel failed to set a lap time within 107% of the fastest driver. He was permitted to start both races from the back of the grid.

=== Sprint race ===
The sprint race was held on 20 September 2025 at 14:15 local time (UTC+4).

Pos.	No.	Driver	Entrant	Laps	Time/Retired	Grid	Points
1	8	(Sweden) Dino Beganovic	Hitech TGR	21	48:46.810	2	10+1
2	7	(United Kingdom) Luke Browning	Hitech TGR	21	+6.281	6	8
3	17	(Republic of Ireland) Alex Dunne	Rodin Motorsport	21	+7.309	7	6
4	11	(United States) Jak Crawford	DAMS Lucas Oil	21	+7.702	10	5
5	1	(Italy) Leonardo Fornaroli	Invicta Racing	21	+11.513	9	4
6	6	(Netherlands) Richard Verschoor	MP Motorsport	21	+12.390	11	3
7	10	(Italy) Gabriele Minì	Prema Racing	21	+12.468	8	2
8	14	(France) Victor Martins	ART Grand Prix	21	+12.704	12	1
9	20	(Paraguay) Joshua Dürksen	AIX Racing	21	+13.339	15	
10	4	(United Kingdom) Arvid Lindblad	Campos Racing	21	+13.818	21	
11	2	(Czech Republic) Roman Staněk	Invicta Racing	21	+14.334	17	
12	15	(Japan) Ritomo Miyata	ART Grand Prix	21	+15.362	18	
13	24	(United Kingdom) John Bennett	Van Amersfoort Racing	21	+17.979	13	
14	21	(United Kingdom) Cian Shields	AIX Racing	21	+32.174	20	
15	9	(Colombia) Sebastián Montoya	Prema Racing	21	+40.505	3	
16	16	(Belgium) Amaury Cordeel	Rodin Motorsport	21	+1:01.111	22	
17	22	(Netherlands) Laurens van Hoepen	Trident	21	+1:29.844^{1}	19	
DNF	23	(Norway) Martinius Stenshorne	Trident	7	Technical issue	4	
DNF	12	(India) Kush Maini	DAMS Lucas Oil	5	Damage	14	
DNF	3	(Spain) Pepe Martí	Campos Racing	1	Collision damage	5	
DNF	25	(Mexico) Rafael Villagómez	Van Amersfoort Racing	0	Collision	1	
DNF	5	(Germany) Oliver Goethe	MP Motorsport	0	Accident	16	
Fastest lap: (Sweden) Dino Beganovic (1:56.561 on lap 15)

Notes:

- ^1 Laurens van Hoepen received a ten-second time penalty for causing a collision with Arvid Lindblad and Ritomo Miyata. This did not affect Van Hoepen's classification.

=== Feature race ===
The feature race was held on 21 September 2025 at 11:00 local time (UTC+4).

Pos.	No.	Driver	Entrant	Laps	Time/Retired	Grid	Points
1	11	(United States) Jak Crawford	DAMS Lucas Oil	29	1:00:40.563	1	25
2	20	(Paraguay) Joshua Dürksen	AIX Racing	29	+0.216	15	18+1
3	8	(Sweden) Dino Beganovic	Hitech TGR	29	+5.371	9	15
4	10	(Italy) Gabriele Minì	Prema Racing	29	+10.811	3	12
5	1	(Italy) Leonardo Fornaroli	Invicta Racing	29	+11.703^{1}	2	10
6	4	(United Kingdom) Arvid Lindblad	Campos Racing	29	+13.970	14	8
7	25	(Mexico) Rafael Villagómez	Van Amersfoort Racing	29	+17.175	10	6
8	6	(Netherlands) Richard Verschoor	MP Motorsport	29	+20.014	11	4
9	9	(Colombia) Sebastián Montoya	Prema Racing	29	+20.950	8	2
10	15	(Japan) Ritomo Miyata	ART Grand Prix	29	+21.351	18	1
11	3	(Spain) Pepe Martí	Campos Racing	29	+23.145^{2}	6	
12	5	(Germany) Oliver Goethe	MP Motorsport	29	+23.165	16	
13	2	(Czech Republic) Roman Staněk	Invicta Racing	29	+26.015	17	
14	24	(United Kingdom) John Bennett	Van Amersfoort Racing	29	+28.637	13	
15	14	(France) Victor Martins	ART Grand Prix	29	+32.951	12	
16	16	(Belgium) Amaury Cordeel	Rodin Motorsport	29	+52.403	22	
17	22	(Netherlands) Laurens van Hoepen	Trident	29	+1:04.205	20	
18	21	(United Kingdom) Cian Shields	AIX Racing	29	+1:34.378^{3}	21	
19	7	(United Kingdom) Luke Browning	Hitech TGR	28	+1 lap	5	
20†	12	(India) Kush Maini	DAMS Lucas Oil	27	+2 laps^{4}	19	
DNF	17	(Republic of Ireland) Alex Dunne	Rodin Motorsport	24	Accident	4	
DNF	23	(Norway) Martinius Stenshorne	Trident	4	Collision	7	
Fastest lap: (Paraguay) Joshua Dürksen (1:56.794 on lap 11)

Notes:

- ^1 Leonardo Fornaroli received a ten-second time penalty for causing a collision with Alex Dunne. This demoted him from 3rd to 5th.
- ^2 Pepe Martí was handed a ten-second time penalty for causing a collision with Martinius Stenshorne. This demoted him from 6th to 11th.
- ^3 Cian Shields was given a ten-second time penalty for failing to slow down sufficiently under yellow flags. This did not affect his classification.
- ^4 Kush Maini retired from the race, but was classified as he completed over 90% of the race distance.

== Standings after the event ==
Drivers' Championship standings

	Pos.	Driver	Points
	1	(Italy) Leonardo Fornaroli	188
2	2	(United States) Jak Crawford	169
1	3	(United Kingdom) Luke Browning	161
1	4	(Netherlands) Richard Verschoor	151
	5	(Republic of Ireland) Alex Dunne	130

Teams' Championship standings

	Pos.	Team	Points
	1	(United Kingdom) Invicta Racing	269
	2	(United Kingdom) Hitech TGR	257
	3	(Spain) Campos Racing	221
1	4	(France) DAMS Lucas Oil	195
1	5	(Netherlands) MP Motorsport	174

Note: Only the top five positions are included for both sets of standings.

== See also ==
- 2025 Azerbaijan Grand Prix

Previous round: 2025 Monza Formula 2 round	FIA Formula 2 Championship; 2025 season	Next round: 2025 Lusail Formula 2 round
Previous round: 2024 Baku Formula 2 round	Baku Formula 2 round	Next round: 2026 Baku Formula 2 round
