= 2026 Madrid Formula 2 round =

Motor racing event in Madrid, Spain

(Spain) 2026 Madrid Formula 2 round
Round details
- Round 11 of 14 in the 2026 FIA Formula 2 Championship.
- Location: Madring; Madrid, Spain
- Course: Street circuit 5.414 km (3.364 mi)

Sprint Race
- Date: 12 September 2026
- Laps: 23
Podium
First	(Japan) Ritomo Miyata	Hitech
Second	(Brazil) Emerson Fittipaldi Jr.	AIX Racing
Third	(Netherlands) Laurens van Hoepen	Trident
Fastest lap
Driver	(United Kingdom) Cian Shields	AIX Racing
- Time: 1:49.161 (on lap 21)

Feature Race
- Date: 13 September 2026
- Laps: 31
Pole position
Driver	(Sweden) Dino Beganovic	DAMS Lucas Oil
Time	1:44.331	
Podium
First	(Sweden) Dino Beganovic	DAMS Lucas Oil
Second	(Republic of Ireland) Alex Dunne	Rodin Motorsport
Third	(Japan) Ritomo Miyata	Hitech
Fastest lap
Driver	(Republic of Ireland) Alex Dunne	Rodin Motorsport
- Time: 1:46.257 (on lap 29)

The 2026 Madrid FIA Formula 2 round was a motor racing event held between 11 and 13 September 2026 at the Madring. It was the eleventh round of the 2026 FIA Formula 2 Championship and was held in support of the 2026 Spanish Grand Prix.

== Classification ==
=== Qualifying ===
Qualifying was held on 11 September 2026 at 15:00 local time (UTC+2).

Pos.	No.	Driver	Entrant	Time/Gap	Grid SR	Grid FR
1	7	(Sweden) Dino Beganovic	DAMS Lucas Oil	1:44.331	10	1
2	15	(Republic of Ireland) Alex Dunne	Rodin Motorsport	+0.230	9	2
3	1	(Brazil) Rafael Câmara	Invicta Racing	+0.522	8	3
4	14	(Norway) Martinius Stenshorne	Rodin Motorsport	+0.607	7	4
5	6	(Bulgaria) Nikola Tsolov	Campos Racing	+0.607	6	5
6	8	(Poland) Roman Bilinski	DAMS Lucas Oil	+0.665	5	6
7	24	(Netherlands) Laurens van Hoepen	Trident	+0.687	4	7
8	5	(Mexico) Noel León	Campos Racing	+0.824	3	8
9	3	(Japan) Ritomo Miyata	Hitech	+0.936	2	9
10	20	(Brazil) Emerson Fittipaldi Jr.	AIX Racing	+1.061	1	10
11	23	(Mexico) Rafael Villagómez	Van Amersfoort Racing	+1.239	11	11
12	4	(United States) Colton Herta	Hitech	+1.328	—^{1}	—^{1}
13	12	(Spain) Mari Boya	Prema Racing	+1.366	12	12
14	9	(Italy) Gabriele Minì	MP Motorsport	+1.375	13	13
15	10	(Germany) Oliver Goethe	MP Motorsport	+1.620	14	14
16	2	(Paraguay) Joshua Dürksen	Invicta Racing	+2.152	15	15
17	25	(United Kingdom) John Bennett	Trident	+2.677^{2}	16	16
18	21	(United Kingdom) Cian Shields	AIX Racing	+2.891	17	17
107% time: 1:51.634 (+7.303)
—	11	(Colombia) Sebastián Montoya	Prema Racing	+29.879	20^{3}	19^{3}
—	22	(Argentina) Nico Varrone	Van Amersfoort Racing	No time	18^{3}	18^{3}
—	16	(India) Kush Maini	ART Grand Prix	No time	19^{3}	21^{4}
—	17	(Thailand) Tasanapol Inthraphuvasak	ART Grand Prix	No time	21^{3}	20^{3}

Notes:

- ^1 – Colton Herta withdrew from both races due to illness.
- ^2 – John Bennett had his fastest lap time deleted due to being the sole cause of a red flag after making contact with the concrete wall.
- ^3 – Sebastián Montoya, Nico Varrone, Kush Maini, and Tasanapol Inthraphuvasak all failed to set a lap time within 107% of the fastest driver. All were given permission by the stewards to start both races from the back of the grid.
- ^4 – Kush Maini received a ten-second time penalty during the sprint race for causing a collision with Nico Varrone. After failing to be classified in the sprint race, Maini's time penalty was converted into a five-place grid penalty for the feature race, dropping him from 19th to 21st on the grid.

=== Sprint race ===
The sprint race was held on 12 September 2026 at 14:15 local time (UTC+2).

Pos.	No.	Driver	Entrant	Laps	Time/Retired	Grid	Points
1	3	(Japan) Ritomo Miyata	Hitech	23	47:21.330	2	10+1
2	20	(Brazil) Emerson Fittipaldi Jr.	AIX Racing	23	+2.678	1	8
3	24	(Netherlands) Laurens van Hoepen	Trident	23	+3.227	4	6
4	5	(Mexico) Noel León	Campos Racing	23	+5.242	3	5
5	14	(Norway) Martinius Stenshorne	Rodin Motorsport	23	+5.776	7	4
6	1	(Brazil) Rafael Câmara	Invicta Racing	23	+6.551	8	3
7	15	(Republic of Ireland) Alex Dunne	Rodin Motorsport	23	+7.099	9	2
8	12	(Spain) Mari Boya	Prema Racing	23	+8.333	12	1
9	9	(Italy) Gabriele Minì	MP Motorsport	23	+9.419	13	
10	7	(Sweden) Dino Beganovic	DAMS Lucas Oil	23	+9.614	10	
11	8	(Poland) Roman Bilinski	DAMS Lucas Oil	23	+10.207	5	
12	10	(Germany) Oliver Goethe	MP Motorsport	23	+11.514	14	
13	23	(Mexico) Rafael Villagómez	Van Amersfoort Racing	23	+13.579	11	
14	2	(Paraguay) Joshua Dürksen	Invicta Racing	23	+14.495	15	
15	17	(Thailand) Tasanapol Inthraphuvasak	ART Grand Prix	23	+14.970	21	
16	21	(United Kingdom) Cian Shields	AIX Racing	23	+17.801	17	
17	11	(Colombia) Sebastián Montoya	Prema Racing	20	+3 laps	20	
DNF	6	(Bulgaria) Nikola Tsolov	Campos Racing	13	Accident	6	
DNF	25	(United Kingdom) John Bennett	Trident	2	Collision damage	16	
DNF	16	(India) Kush Maini	ART Grand Prix	1	Collision damage	19	
DNF	22	(Argentina) Nico Varrone	Van Amersfoort Racing	0	Collision	18	
DNS	4	(United States) Colton Herta	Hitech	—	Withdrawn	—	
Fastest lap: (United Kingdom) Cian Shields (1:49.161 on lap 21)^{1}

- ^1 – Cian Shields set the fastest lap but did not finish in the top ten, so was ineligible to score the point for it. Ritomo Miyata scored the point for setting the fastest lap among those finishing in the top ten.

=== Feature race ===
The feature race was held on 13 September 2026 at 11:25 local time (UTC+2).

Pos.	No.	Driver	Entrant	Laps	Time/Retired	Grid	Points
1	7	(Sweden) Dino Beganovic	DAMS Lucas Oil	31	1:03:29.190	1	25+2
2	15	(Republic of Ireland) Alex Dunne	Rodin Motorsport	31	+7.320	2	18+1
3	3	(Japan) Ritomo Miyata	Hitech	31	+14.015	9	15
4	2	(Paraguay) Joshua Dürksen	Invicta Racing	31	+16.691	15	12
5	20	(Brazil) Emerson Fittipaldi Jr.	AIX Racing	31	+19.630	10	10
6	17	(Thailand) Tasanapol Inthraphuvasak	ART Grand Prix	31	+20.458	20	8
7	9	(Italy) Gabriele Minì	MP Motorsport	31	+21.268	13	6
8	14	(Norway) Martinius Stenshorne	Rodin Motorsport	31	+21.497	4	4
9	8	(Poland) Roman Bilinski	DAMS Lucas Oil	31	+28.311	6	2
10	1	(Brazil) Rafael Câmara	Invicta Racing	31	+35.386^{1}	3	1
11	12	(Spain) Mari Boya	Prema Racing	31	+36.234	12	
12	24	(Netherlands) Laurens van Hoepen	Trident	31	+37.403	7	
13	11	(Colombia) Sebastián Montoya	Prema Racing	31	+37.629	19	
14	23	(Mexico) Rafael Villagómez	Van Amersfoort Racing	31	+40.781	11	
15	22	(Argentina) Nico Varrone	Van Amersfoort Racing	31	+41.215	18	
16	5	(Mexico) Noel León	Campos Racing	31	+42.032^{2}	8	
17	21	(United Kingdom) Cian Shields	AIX Racing	31	+43.311	17	
18	6	(Bulgaria) Nikola Tsolov	Campos Racing	31	+47.888	5	
DNF	10	(Germany) Oliver Goethe	MP Motorsport	17	Collision	14	
DNF	25	(United Kingdom) John Bennett	Trident	17	Accident	16	
DNF	16	(India) Kush Maini	ART Grand Prix	1	Collision	21	
DNS	4	(United States) Colton Herta	Hitech	—	Withdrawn	—	
Fastest lap: (Republic of Ireland) Alex Dunne (1:46.257 on lap 29)

Notes:

- ^1 – Rafael Câmara received a ten-second time penalty for causing a collision with Oliver Goethe.
- ^2 – Noel León received a five-second time penalty for exceeding track limits on four separate occasions.

== Standings after the event ==
Drivers' Championship standings

Pos.	Driver	Points
1	(Bulgaria) Nikola Tsolov	177
2	(Brazil) Rafael Câmara	170
3	(Italy) Gabriele Minì	153
4	(Republic of Ireland) Alex Dunne	139
5	(Mexico) Noel León	119

Teams' Championship standings

	Pos.	Team	Points
	1	(Spain) Campos Racing	296
	2	(United Kingdom) Invicta Racing	260
1	3	(New Zealand) Rodin Motorsport	209
1	4	(Netherlands) MP Motorsport	190
	5	(France) ART Grand Prix	159

Note: Only the top five positions are included for both sets of standings.

== See also ==
- 2026 Spanish Grand Prix
- 2026 Madrid Formula 3 round

Previous round: 2026 Monza Formula 2 round	FIA Formula 2 Championship; 2026 season	Next round: 2026 Baku Formula 2 round
Previous round: None	Madrid Formula 2 round	Next round: 2027 Madrid Formula 2 round
