= 2025 Silverstone Formula 2 round =

Motor racing event

(United Kingdom) 2025 Silverstone Formula 2 round
Round details
- Round 8 of 14 in the 2025 FIA Formula 2 Championship.
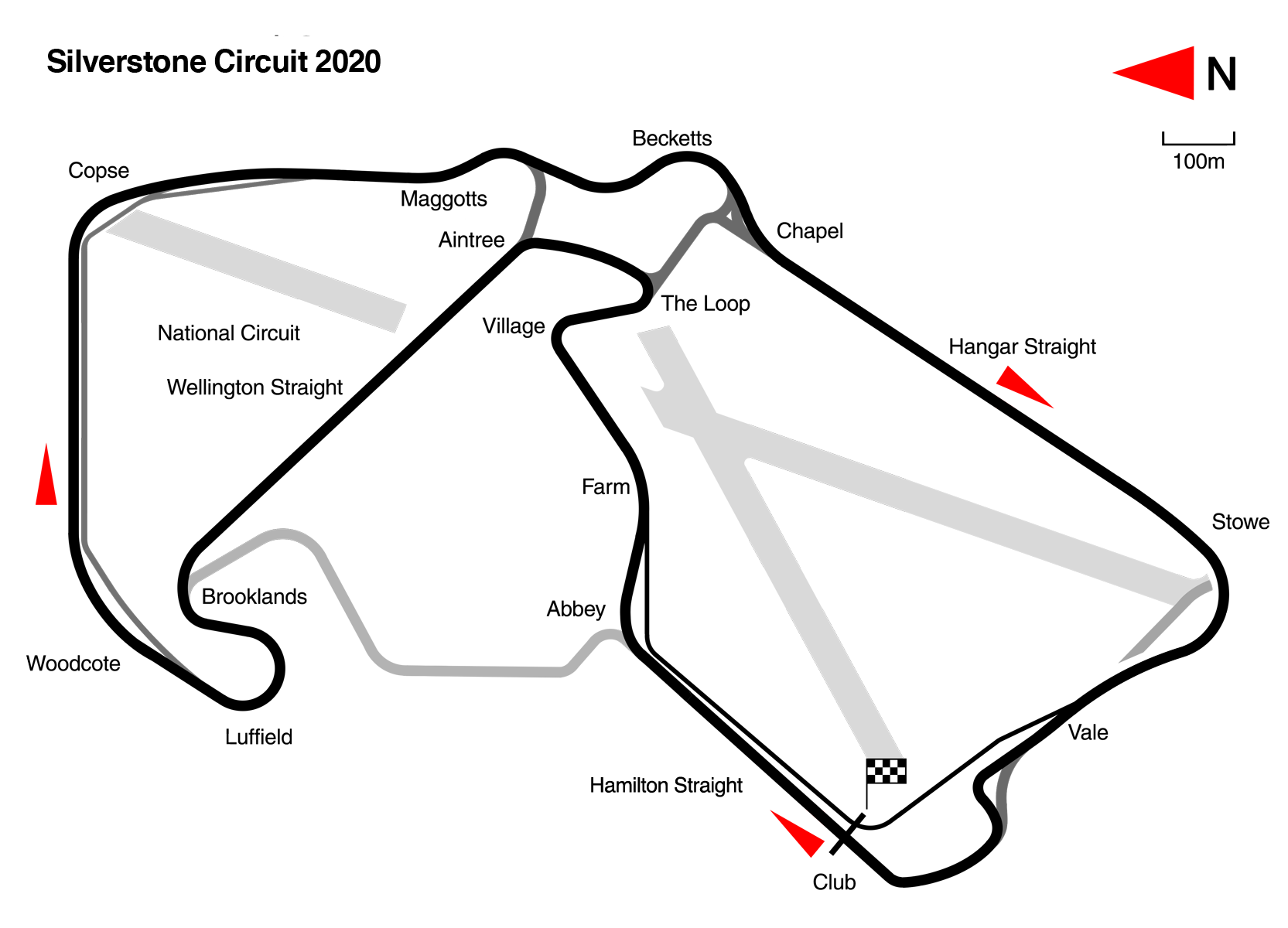
- Layout of Silverstone Circuit
- Location: Silverstone Circuit; Silverstone, United Kingdom
- Course: Permanent racing facility 5.891 km (3.660 mi)

Sprint Race
- Date: 5 July 2025
- Laps: 21
Podium
First	(Italy) Leonardo Fornaroli	Invicta Racing
Second	(Colombia) Sebastián Montoya	Prema Racing
Third	(Czech Republic) Roman Staněk	Invicta Racing
Fastest lap
Driver	(Colombia) Sebastián Montoya	Prema Racing
- Time: 1:44.198 (on lap 20)

Feature Race
- Date: 6 July 2025
- Laps: 29
Pole position
Driver	(France) Victor Martins	ART Grand Prix
Time	1:39.731	
Podium
First	(United States) Jak Crawford	DAMS Lucas Oil
Second	(Republic of Ireland) Alex Dunne	Rodin Motorsport
Third	(United Kingdom) Luke Browning	Hitech TGR
Fastest lap
Driver	(United Kingdom) Arvid Lindblad	Campos Racing
- Time: 2:00.087 (on lap 22)

The 2025 Silverstone FIA Formula 2 round was a motor racing event held between 4 and 6 July 2025 at Silverstone Circuit. It was the eighth round of the 2025 FIA Formula 2 Championship and was held in support of the 2025 British Grand Prix.

Victor Martins took his second pole position of the season in qualifying, with Leonardo Fornaroli on reverse-grid sprint pole. Fornaroli was overtaken at the start by Kush Maini, but reclaimed the position into Copse. He steadily pulled a gap to Maini, and on lap 15 Sebastián Montoya passed him for second place. On the penultimate lap, Roman Staněk passed Maini off-track for third, a move which was permitted as Staněk was forced off the track. The race was Fornaroli's first single-seater victory since 2021.

The feature race took place in wet conditions. Martins had a poor start, with Jak Crawford going from third to first on the opening lap, ahead of Alex Dunne. Luke Browning, who started twelfth, made his way through the field and passed Martins for third on lap 18. Gabriele Minì pitted for slick tyres on lap 21, but collided with Oliver Goethe after leaving the pits and stopped on track. Crawford entered the pits seconds before the virtual safety car was announced, preventing the other frontrunners from following him. He retook the lead of the race when the full safety car was brought out, allowing to rest of the field to change tyres. The race ended under safety car as Joshua Dürksen spun on the restart, with Crawford winning ahead of Dunne and Browning. Richard Verschoor retained the championship lead, with Crawford six points behind.

== Classification ==
=== Qualifying ===
Qualifying was held on 4 July 2025, at 14:55 local time (UTC+1).

Pos.	No.	Driver	Entrant	Time/Gap	Grid SR	Grid FR
1	14	(France) Victor Martins	ART Grand Prix	1:39.731	10	1
2	17	(Republic of Ireland) Alex Dunne	Rodin Motorsport	+0.065	9	2
3	11	(United States) Jak Crawford	DAMS Lucas Oil	+0.240	8	3
4	2	(Czech Republic) Roman Staněk	Invicta Racing	+0.334	7	4
5	9	(Colombia) Sebastián Montoya	Prema Racing	+0.407	6	5
6	20	(Paraguay) Joshua Dürksen	AIX Racing	+0.438	5	6
7	6	(Netherlands) Richard Verschoor	MP Motorsport	+0.595	4	7
8	8	(Sweden) Dino Beganovic	Hitech TGR	+0.606	3	8
9	12	(India) Kush Maini	DAMS Lucas Oil	+0.649	2	9
10	1	(Italy) Leonardo Fornaroli	Invicta Racing	+0.697	1	10
11	4	(United Kingdom) Arvid Lindblad	Campos Racing	+0.769	11	11
12	7	(United Kingdom) Luke Browning	Hitech TGR	+1.004	12	12
13	22	(France) Sami Meguetounif	Trident	+1.104	13	13
14	23	(United States) Max Esterson	Trident	+1.211	14	14
15	25	(Mexico) Rafael Villagómez	Van Amersfoort Racing	+1.265	15	15
16	10	(Italy) Gabriele Minì	Prema Racing	+1.337	16	16
17	24	(United Kingdom) John Bennett	Van Amersfoort Racing	+1.449	17	17
18	5	(Germany) Oliver Goethe	MP Motorsport	+1.480	18	18
19	3	(Spain) Pepe Martí	Campos Racing	+1.602	19	19
20	21	(United Kingdom) Cian Shields	AIX Racing	+2.256	20	20
107% time: 1:46.712
—	16	(Belgium) Amaury Cordeel	Rodin Motorsport	+39.097^{1}	22	22
—	15	(Japan) Ritomo Miyata	ART Grand Prix	No time^{1}	21	21

Notes:

- ^1 Amaury Cordeel's fastest lap was deleted as he caused a red flag during qualifying. Both he and Ritomo Miyata, who suffered from mechanical issues during qualifying, were permitted to start the races from the back of the grid.

=== Sprint race ===
The sprint race was held on 5 July 2025, at 13:15 local time (UTC+1).

Pos.	No.	Driver	Entrant	Laps	Time/Retired	Grid	Points
1	1	(Italy) Leonardo Fornaroli	Invicta Racing	21	36:53.118	1	10
2	9	(Colombia) Sebastián Montoya	Prema Racing	21	+1.404	6	8+1
3	2	(Czech Republic) Roman Staněk	Invicta Racing	21	+9.395	7	6
4	12	(India) Kush Maini	DAMS Lucas Oil	21	+11.188	2	5
5	20	(Paraguay) Joshua Dürksen	AIX Racing	21	+11.866	5	4
6	11	(United States) Jak Crawford	DAMS Lucas Oil	21	+11.867	8	3
7	6	(Netherlands) Richard Verschoor	MP Motorsport	21	+13.534	4	2
8	14	(France) Victor Martins	ART Grand Prix	21	+14.826	10	1
9	4	(United Kingdom) Arvid Lindblad	Campos Racing	21	+14.962	11	
10	3	(Spain) Pepe Martí	Campos Racing	21	+15.872	19	
11	5	(Germany) Oliver Goethe	MP Motorsport	21	+21.745	18	
12	7	(United Kingdom) Luke Browning	Hitech TGR	21	+22.810^{1}	12	
13	22	(France) Sami Meguetounif	Trident	21	+23.770	13	
14	10	(Italy) Gabriele Minì	Prema Racing	21	+25.408^{1}	16	
15	24	(United Kingdom) John Bennett	Van Amersfoort Racing	21	+26.366	17	
16	25	(Mexico) Rafael Villagómez	Van Amersfoort Racing	21	+29.842	15	
17	21	(United Kingdom) Cian Shields	AIX Racing	21	+31.988	20	
18	8	(Sweden) Dino Beganovic	Hitech TGR	21	+33.483	3	
19	16	(Belgium) Amaury Cordeel	Rodin Motorsport	21	+34.259	22	
20	15	(Japan) Ritomo Miyata	ART Grand Prix	21	+40.218^{2}	21	
21	23	(United States) Max Esterson	Trident	21	+46.845	14	
DNF	17	(Republic of Ireland) Alex Dunne	Rodin Motorsport	15	Accident damage	9	
Fastest lap: (Colombia) Sebastián Montoya (1:44.198 on lap 20)

Notes:

- ^1 Luke Browning and Gabriele Minì both received ten-second time penalties for causing collisions. Browning was demoted from 7th to 12th and Minì was demoted from 10th to 14th.
- ^2 Ritomo Miyata was given a ten-second time penalty for leaving the track and gaining an advantage. This demoted him from 17th to 20th.

=== Feature race ===
The feature race was held on 6 July 2025, at 11:05 local time (UTC+1).

Pos.	No.	Driver	Entrant	Laps	Time/Retired	Grid	Points
1	11	(United States) Jak Crawford	DAMS Lucas Oil	29	1:03:05.304	3	25
2	17	(Republic of Ireland) Alex Dunne	Rodin Motorsport	29	+0.227	2	18
3	7	(United Kingdom) Luke Browning	Hitech TGR	29	+0.838	12	15
4	8	(Sweden) Dino Beganovic	Hitech TGR	29	+1.369	8	12
5	9	(Colombia) Sebastián Montoya	Prema Racing	29	+1.753	5	10
6	1	(Italy) Leonardo Fornaroli	Invicta Racing	29	+2.215	10	8
7	6	(Netherlands) Richard Verschoor	MP Motorsport	29	+3.035	7	6
8	4	(United Kingdom) Arvid Lindblad	Campos Racing	29	+3.779	11	4+1
9	3	(Spain) Pepe Martí	Campos Racing	29	+4.186	19	2
10	25	(Mexico) Rafael Villagómez	Van Amersfoort Racing	29	+4.467	15	1
11	5	(Germany) Oliver Goethe	MP Motorsport	29	+4.905	18	
12	24	(United Kingdom) John Bennett	Van Amersfoort Racing	29	+5.333	17	
13	23	(United States) Max Esterson	Trident	29	+6.284	14	
14	21	(United Kingdom) Cian Shields	AIX Racing	29	+6.502	20	
15	15	(Japan) Ritomo Miyata	ART Grand Prix	29	+8.929	21	
16	12	(India) Kush Maini	DAMS Lucas Oil	29	+20.277	9	
17	16	(Belgium) Amaury Cordeel	Rodin Motorsport	29	+24.874	22	
18	22	(France) Sami Meguetounif	Trident	29	+1:15.614	13	
19†	14	(France) Victor Martins	ART Grand Prix	28	Accident damage	1	2
20†	20	(Paraguay) Joshua Dürksen	AIX Racing	27	Accident	6	
DNF	2	(Czech Republic) Roman Staněk	Invicta Racing	22	Accident	4	
DNF	10	(Italy) Gabriele Minì	Prema Racing	21	Collision	16	
Fastest lap: (United Kingdom) Arvid Lindblad (2:00.087 on lap 22)

== Standings after the event ==
Drivers' Championship standings

	Pos.	Driver	Points
	1	(Netherlands) Richard Verschoor	122
1	2	(United States) Jak Crawford	116
1	3	(Republic of Ireland) Alex Dunne	108
	4	(Italy) Leonardo Fornaroli	104
	5	(United Kingdom) Luke Browning	98

Teams' Championship standings

	Pos.	Team	Points
	1	(Spain) Campos Racing	153
2	2	(France) DAMS Lucas Oil	142
	3	(United Kingdom) Hitech TGR	141
2	4	(Netherlands) MP Motorsport	134
	5	(United Kingdom) Invicta Racing	133

Note: Only the top five positions are included for both sets of standings.

== See also ==
- 2025 British Grand Prix
- 2025 Silverstone Formula 3 round

Previous round: 2025 Spielberg Formula 2 round	FIA Formula 2 Championship; 2025 season	Next round: 2025 Spa-Francorchamps Formula 2 round
Previous round: 2024 Silverstone Formula 2 round	Silverstone Formula 2 round	Next round: 2026 Silverstone Formula 2 round
