= 2024 Baku Formula 2 round =

Motor racing event in Baku, Azerbaijan

(Azerbaijan) 2024 Baku Formula 2 round
Round details
- Round 12 of 14 in the 2024 FIA Formula 2 Championship.
- Location: Baku City Circuit, Baku, Azerbaijan
- Course: Street Circuit; 6.003 km (3.730 mi)

Sprint Race
- Date: 14 September 2024
- Laps: 21
Podium
First	(Paraguay) Joshua Dürksen	AIX Racing
Second	(United States) Jak Crawford	DAMS Lucas Oil
Third	(Italy) Gabriele Minì	Prema Racing
Fastest lap
Driver	(Netherlands) Richard Verschoor	Trident
- Time: 1:56.629 (on lap 13)

Feature Race
- Date: 15 September 2024
- Laps: 17
Pole position
Driver	(Netherlands) Richard Verschoor	Trident
Time	1:54.857	
Podium
First	(Netherlands) Richard Verschoor	Trident
Second	(France) Victor Martins	ART Grand Prix
Third	(Italy) Andrea Kimi Antonelli	Prema Racing
Fastest lap
Driver	(Brazil) Gabriel Bortoleto	Invicta Racing
- Time: 1:56.417 (on lap 15)

The 2024 Baku FIA Formula 2 round was a motor racing event held between 13 and 15 September 2024 at the Baku City Circuit, Baku, Azerbaijan. It was the twelfth round of the 2024 FIA Formula 2 Championship and was held in support of the 2024 Azerbaijan Grand Prix.

== Driver Changes ==
Oliver Bearman was entered into the 2024 Azerbaijan Grand Prix in place of Kevin Magnussen, who received a one-race ban. 2024 Formula 3 runner-up Gabriele Minì was chosen by Prema to replace Bearman.

Australian driver Christian Mansell, who finished fifth in Formula 3, was announced to replace Roman Staněk at Trident for the rest of the season after the latter's departure from the team due to unsatisfactory equipment and lack of budget.

Similarly, ART Grand Prix driver Zak O'Sullivan left the team due to funding issues. Fellow British and Williams Academy driver Luke Browning was confirmed to replace O'Sullivan for the remainder of the year.

== Classification ==
=== Qualifying ===
Pos.	No.	Driver	Entrant	Time/Gap	Grid SR	Grid FR
1	22	(Netherlands) Richard Verschoor	Trident	1:54.857	10	1
2	4	(Italy) Andrea Kimi Antonelli	Prema Racing	+0.017	9	2
3	1	(France) Victor Martins	ART Grand Prix	+0.245	8	3
4	5	(Barbados) Zane Maloney	Rodin Motorsport	+0.271	7	4
5	9	(India) Kush Maini	Invicta Racing	+0.317	6	5
6	10	(Brazil) Gabriel Bortoleto	Invicta Racing	+0.473	5	6
7	24	(Paraguay) Joshua Dürksen	AIX Racing	+0.474	4	7
8	3	(Italy) Gabriele Minì	Prema Racing	+0.585	3	8
9	7	(United States) Jak Crawford	DAMS Lucas Oil	+0.777	2	9
10	23	(Australia) Christian Mansell	Trident	+0.788	1	10
11	2	(United Kingdom) Luke Browning	ART Grand Prix	+0.867	11	11
12	17	(Estonia) Paul Aron	Hitech Pulse-Eight	+1.081	12	12
13	11	(Norway) Dennis Hauger	MP Motorsport	+1.279	13	13
14	8	(United States) Juan Manuel Correa	DAMS Lucas Oil	+1.396	14	14
15	14	(Brazil) Enzo Fittipaldi	Van Amersfoort Racing	+1.829	15	15
16	6	(Japan) Ritomo Miyata	Rodin Motorsport	+1.839	16	16
17	12	(Germany) Oliver Goethe	MP Motorsport	+1.851	17	17
18	16	(Belgium) Amaury Cordeel	Hitech Pulse-Eight	+1.854	18	18
19	15	(Mexico) Rafael Villagómez	Van Amersfoort Racing	+2.030	19	19
20	20	(France) Isack Hadjar	Campos Racing	+2.036^{1}	20	20
21	21	(Spain) Pepe Martí	Campos Racing	+2.361	21	21
22	25	(Netherlands) Niels Koolen	AIX Racing	+6.787	22	22

Notes

- ^1 – Isack Hadjar originally qualified 15th, but his fastest lap was deleted after he was found the sole responsible of causing a red flag during qualifying.

=== Sprint race ===
Pos.	No.	Driver	Entrant	Laps	Time/Retired	Grid	Points
1	24	(Paraguay) Joshua Dürksen	AIX Racing	21	44:00.116	4	10 (1)
2	7	(United States) Jak Crawford	DAMS Lucas Oil	21	+3.444	2	8
3	3	(Italy) Gabriele Minì	Prema Racing	21	+4.579	3	6
4	1	(France) Victor Martins	ART Grand Prix	21	+4.599	8	5
5	10	(Brazil) Gabriel Bortoleto	Invicta Racing	21	+7.807	5	4
6	17	(Estonia) Paul Aron	Hitech Pulse-Eight	21	+8.793	12	3
7	4	(Italy) Andrea Kimi Antonelli	Prema Racing	21	+9.293	9	2
8	23	(Australia) Christian Mansell	Trident	21	+13.436	1	1
9	9	(India) Kush Maini	Invicta Racing	21	+15.013	6	
10	5	(Barbados) Zane Maloney	Rodin Motorsport	21	+15.515	7	
11	2	(United Kingdom) Luke Browning	ART Grand Prix	21	+15.740	11	
12	20	(France) Isack Hadjar	Campos Racing	21	+16.208	20	
13	14	(Brazil) Enzo Fittipaldi	Van Amersfoort Racing	21	+17.065	15	
14	11	(Norway) Dennis Hauger	MP Motorsport	21	+17.094	13	
15	8	(United States) Juan Manuel Correa	DAMS Lucas Oil	21	+18.039	14	
16	15	(Mexico) Rafael Villagómez	Van Amersfoort Racing	21	+20.637	19	
17	22	(Netherlands) Richard Verschoor	Trident	21	+22.828	10	
18	16	(Belgium) Amaury Cordeel	Hitech Pulse-Eight	21	+47.405	18	
19	21	(Spain) Pepe Martí	Campos Racing	21	+52.191	21	
20	25	(Netherlands) Niels Koolen	AIX Racing	21	+56.243	22	
21	12	(Germany) Oliver Goethe	MP Motorsport	21	+1:42.954^{1}	17	
DNF	6	(Japan) Ritomo Miyata	Rodin Motorsport	14	Accident	16	
Fastest lap set by (Netherlands) Richard Verschoor: 1:56.629 (lap 13)

Notes

- ^1 – Oliver Goethe received a 5 second time penalty for causing a collision with Amaury Cordeel.

=== Feature race ===
The feature race was red flagged shortly after the start, as Kush Maini stalled and Oliver Goethe and Pepe Martí crashed into the stationary Invicta car. Damage from this accident saw all three drivers retire, as well as Rafael Villagómez and Niels Koolen. All drivers were able to walk out of their cars unscathed.

The debris cleaning after the collision resulted in the race being condensed into a timed finish. Only 17 laps of the 29 scheduled were completed and reduced points were awarded. The last two laps of the race happened under safety car conditions due to a late crash by debutant Gabriele Minì.

Pos.	No.	Driver	Entrant	Laps	Time/Retired	Grid	Points^{1}
1	22	(Netherlands) Richard Verschoor	Trident	17	1:10:08.415	1	19 (2)
2	1	(France) Victor Martins	ART Grand Prix	17	+0.333	3	14
3	4	(Italy) Andrea Kimi Antonelli	Prema Racing	17	+0.567	2	12
4	10	(Brazil) Gabriel Bortoleto	Invicta Racing	17	+0.567	6	10 (1)
5	24	(Paraguay) Joshua Dürksen	AIX Racing	17	+1.002	7	8
6	17	(Estonia) Paul Aron	Hitech Pulse-Eight	17	+1.212	12	6
7	2	(United Kingdom) Luke Browning	ART Grand Prix	17	+1.351	11	4
8	7	(United States) Jak Crawford	DAMS Lucas Oil	17	+1.468	9	3
9	11	(Norway) Dennis Hauger	MP Motorsport	17	+1.910	13	2
10	23	(Australia) Christian Mansell	Trident	17	+2.163	10	1
11	14	(Brazil) Enzo Fittipaldi	Van Amersfoort Racing	17	+2.653	15	
12	16	(Belgium) Amaury Cordeel	Hitech Pulse-Eight	17	+3.348	18	
13	6	(Japan) Ritomo Miyata	Rodin Motorsport	17	+3.391	16	
14	20	(France) Isack Hadjar	Campos Racing	17	+4.127	20	
15	5	(Barbados) Zane Maloney	Rodin Motorsport	17	+42.182	6	
DNF	3	(Italy) Gabriele Minì	Prema Racing	14	Accident	8	
DNF	8	(United States) Juan Manuel Correa	DAMS Lucas Oil	5	Engine	14	
DNF	12	(Germany) Oliver Goethe	MP Motorsport	0	Collision damage	17	
DNF	15	(Mexico) Rafael Villagómez	Van Amersfoort Racing	0	Collision damage	19	
DNF	21	(Spain) Pepe Martí	Campos Racing	0	Collision	21	
DNF	25	(Netherlands) Niels Koolen	AIX Racing	0	Collision damage	22	
DNF	9	(India) Kush Maini	Invicta Racing	0	Collision damage	5	
Fastest lap set by (Brazil) Gabriel Bortoleto: 1:56.417 (lap 15)

Notes

- ^1 - As more than 50% but less than 75% of the scheduled race distance was completed, reduced points were awarded on a 19–14–12–10–8–6–4–3–2–1 basis to the top ten finishers.

== Standings after the event ==
Drivers' Championship standings

	Pos.	Driver	Points
1	1	(Brazil) Gabriel Bortoleto	169.5
1	2	(France) Isack Hadjar	165
	3	(Barbados) Zane Maloney	135
	4	(Estonia) Paul Aron	133
	5	(United States) Jak Crawford	116

Teams' Championship standings

	Pos.	Team	Points
	1	(United Kingdom) Invicta Racing	243.5
	2	(Spain) Campos Racing	208
	3	(Netherlands) MP Motorsport	181.5
2	4	(Italy) Prema Racing	169
1	5	(New Zealand) Rodin Motorsport	164

- Note: Only the top five positions are included for both sets of standings.

== See also ==
- 2024 Azerbaijan Grand Prix

Previous round: 2024 Monza Formula 2 round	FIA Formula 2 Championship; 2024 season	Next round: 2024 Lusail Formula 2 round
Previous round: 2023 Baku Formula 2 round	Baku Formula 2 round	Next round: 2025 Baku Formula 2 round
