= 2026 Budapest Formula 2 round =

Motor racing event in Mogyoród, Hungary

(Hungary) 2026 Budapest Formula 2 round
Round details
- Round 9 of 14 in the 2026 FIA Formula 2 Championship.
- Location: Hungaroring; Mogyoród, Hungary
- Course: Permanent racing facility 4.381 km (2.722 mi)

Sprint Race
- Date: 25 July 2026
- Laps: 28
Podium
First	(Italy) Gabriele Minì	MP Motorsport
Second	(Sweden) Dino Beganovic	DAMS Lucas Oil
Third	(Netherlands) Laurens van Hoepen	Trident
Fastest lap
Driver	(Poland) Roman Bilinski	DAMS Lucas Oil
- Time: 1:30.989 (on lap 24)

Feature Race
- Date: 26 July 2026
- Laps: 37
Pole position
Driver	(India) Kush Maini	ART Grand Prix
Time	1:28.896	
Podium
First	(Mexico) Noel León	Campos Racing
Second	(India) Kush Maini	ART Grand Prix
Third	(Brazil) Rafael Câmara	Invicta Racing
Fastest lap
Driver	(Norway) Martinius Stenshorne	Rodin Motorsport
- Time: 1:31.415 (on lap 26)

The 2026 Budapest FIA Formula 2 round was a motor racing event held between 24 and 26 July 2026 at the Hungaroring. It was the ninth round of the 2026 FIA Formula 2 Championship and was held in support of the 2026 Hungarian Grand Prix.

== Classification ==
=== Qualifying ===
Qualifying was held on 24 July 2026 at 16:05 local time (UTC+2).

Pos.	No.	Driver	Entrant	Time/Gap	Grid SR	Grid FR
1	1	(India) Kush Maini	ART Grand Prix	1:28.896	10	1
2	1	(Brazil) Rafael Câmara	Invicta Racing	+0.117	9	2
3	5	(Mexico) Noel León	Campos Racing	+0.195	8	3
4	2	(Paraguay) Joshua Dürksen	Invicta Racing	+0.210	7	4
5	17	(Thailand) Tasanapol Inthraphuvasak	ART Grand Prix	+0.311	6	5
6	24	(Netherlands) Laurens van Hoepen	Trident	+0.374	5	6
7	6	(Bulgaria) Nikola Tsolov	Campos Racing	+0.417	4	12^{1}
8	7	(Sweden) Dino Beganovic	DAMS Lucas Oil	+0.423	3	7
9	9	(Italy) Gabriele Minì	MP Motorsport	+0.445	2	8
10	11	(Colombia) Sebastián Montoya	Prema Racing	+0.567	1	9
11	14	(Norway) Martinius Stenshorne	Rodin Motorsport	+0.570	11	10
12	23	(Mexico) Rafael Villagómez	Van Amersfoort Racing	+0.615	12	11
13	10	(Germany) Oliver Goethe	MP Motorsport	+0.689	13	13
14	25	(United Kingdom) John Bennett	Trident	+0.895	14	14
15	20	(Brazil) Emerson Fittipaldi Jr.	AIX Racing	+0.908	15	15
16	22	(Argentina) Nico Varrone	Van Amersfoort Racing	+0.933	16	16
17	15	(Republic of Ireland) Alex Dunne	Rodin Motorsport	+0.939	17	17
18	4	(United States) Colton Herta	Hitech	+1.028	18	18
19	21	(United Kingdom) Cian Shields	AIX Racing	+1.135	19	19
20	8	(Poland) Roman Bilinski	DAMS Lucas Oil	+1.178	20	20
21	3	(Japan) Ritomo Miyata	Hitech	+1.212	21	21
22	12	(Spain) Mari Boya	Prema Racing	+1.513	22	22

Notes:

- ^1 – Nikola Tsolov received a ten-second time penalty following the sprint race for causing a collision with Sebastián Montoya. However, due to Tsolov not being classified in the sprint race, the penalty was converted to a five-place grid penalty for the feature race. The penalty dropped Tsolov from 7th to 12th on the starting grid.

=== Sprint race ===
The sprint race was held on 25 July 2026 at 14:15 local time (UTC+2).

Pos.	No.	Driver	Entrant	Laps	Time/Retired	Grid	Points
1	9	(Italy) Gabriele Minì	MP Motorsport	28	44:19.172	2	10+1
2	7	(Sweden) Dino Beganovic	DAMS Lucas Oil	28	+3.787	3	8
3	24	(Netherlands) Laurens van Hoepen	Trident	28	+4.876	5	6
4	1	(Brazil) Rafael Câmara	Invicta Racing	28	+7.021	9	5
5	16	(India) Kush Maini	ART Grand Prix	28	+12.836	10	4
6	17	(Thailand) Tasanapol Inthraphuvasak	ART Grand Prix	28	+15.646	6	3
7	2	(Paraguay) Joshua Dürksen	Invicta Racing	28	+20.215	7	2
8	14	(Norway) Martinius Stenshorne	Rodin Motorsport	28	+20.830	11	1
9	5	(Mexico) Noel León	Campos Racing	28	+21.113^{1}	8	
10	25	(United Kingdom) John Bennett	Trident	28	+21.271	14	
11	22	(Argentina) Nico Varrone	Van Amersfoort Racing	28	+23.003	16	
12	10	(Germany) Oliver Goethe	MP Motorsport	28	+24.410	13	
13	3	(Japan) Ritomo Miyata	Hitech	28	+24.907	21	
14	4	(United States) Colton Herta	Hitech	28	+25.786	18	
15	23	(Mexico) Rafael Villagómez	Van Amersfoort Racing	28	+31.436	12	
16	21	(United Kingdom) Cian Shields	AIX Racing	28	+33.756	19	
17	12	(Spain) Mari Boya	Prema Racing	28	+34.633	22	
18	8	(Poland) Roman Bilinski	DAMS Lucas Oil	28	+38.808	20	
19	15	(Republic of Ireland) Alex Dunne	Rodin Motorsport	28	+39.139	17	
20	20	(Brazil) Emerson Fittipaldi Jr.	AIX Racing	28	+1:03.775	15	
DNF	6	(Bulgaria) Nikola Tsolov	Campos Racing	21	Collision damage	4	
DNF	11	(Colombia) Sebastián Montoya	Prema Racing	20	Collision	1	
Fastest lap: (Poland) Roman Bilinski (1:30.989 on lap 24)^{2}

Notes:

- ^1 – Noel León received a five-second time penalty for exceeding the minimum delta time during a Virtual Safety Car.
- ^2 – Roman Bilinski set the fastest lap but did not finish in the top ten, so was ineligible to score the point for it. Gabriele Minì scored the point for setting the fastest lap among those finishing in the top ten.

=== Feature race ===
The feature race was held on 26 July 2026 at 11:25 local time (UTC+2).

Pos.	No.	Driver	Entrant	Laps	Time/Retired	Grid	Points
1	5	(Mexico) Noel León	Campos Racing	37	58:35.987	3	25
2	16	(India) Kush Maini	ART Grand Prix	37	+0.887	1	18+1
3	1	(Brazil) Rafael Câmara	Invicta Racing	37	+1.376	2	15
4	24	(Netherlands) Laurens van Hoepen	Trident	37	+4.994	6	12
5	17	(Thailand) Tasanapol Inthraphuvasak	ART Grand Prix	37	+9.416	5	10
6	7	(Sweden) Dino Beganovic	DAMS Lucas Oil	37	+12.589	7	8
7	6	(Bulgaria) Nikola Tsolov	Campos Racing	37	+13.342	12	6
8	2	(Paraguay) Joshua Dürksen	Invicta Racing	37	+17.393	4	4
9	9	(Italy) Gabriele Minì	MP Motorsport	37	+19.098	8	2
10	25	(United Kingdom) John Bennett	Trident	37	+23.927	14	1
11	15	(Republic of Ireland) Alex Dunne	Rodin Motorsport	37	+24.394	17	
12	22	(Argentina) Nico Varrone	Van Amersfoort Racing	37	+38.671	16	
13	3	(Japan) Ritomo Miyata	Hitech	37	+39.253	21	
14	8	(Poland) Roman Bilinski	DAMS Lucas Oil	37	+39.449	20	
15	12	(Spain) Mari Boya	Prema Racing	37	+48.918	22	
16	11	(Colombia) Sebastián Montoya	Prema Racing	37	+49.214	9	
17	20	(Brazil) Emerson Fittipaldi Jr.	AIX Racing	37	+50.327	15	
18	10	(Germany) Oliver Goethe	MP Motorsport	37	+50.876	13	
19	4	(United States) Colton Herta	Hitech	37	+55.476^{1}	18	
20	21	(United Kingdom) Cian Shields	AIX Racing	37	+59.976	19	
21	14	(Norway) Martinius Stenshorne	Rodin Motorsport	35	+2 laps	10	
DNF	23	(Mexico) Rafael Villagómez	Van Amersfoort Racing	15	Retired	11	
Fastest lap: (Norway) Martinius Stenshorne (1:31.415 on lap 26)^{2}

Notes:

- ^1 – Colton Herta received a ten-second time penalty for leaving the track and gaining an advantage over Alex Dunne.
- ^2 – Martinius Stenshorne set the fastest lap but did not finish in the top ten, so was ineligible to score the point for it. Kush Maini scored the point for setting the fastest lap among those finishing in the top ten.

== Standings after the event ==
Drivers' Championship standings
Pos.	Driver	Points
1	(Bulgaria) Nikola Tsolov	167
2	(Italy) Gabriele Minì	147
3	(Brazil) Rafael Câmara	145
4	(Republic of Ireland) Alex Dunne	108
5	(Mexico) Noel León	94

Teams' Championship standings
	Pos.	Team	Points
	1	(Spain) Campos Racing	261
2	2	(United Kingdom) Invicta Racing	187
	3	(Netherlands) MP Motorsport	176
2	4	(New Zealand) Rodin Motorsport	167
	5	(France) ART Grand Prix	147

Note: Only the top five positions are included for both sets of standings.

== See also ==
- 2026 Hungarian Grand Prix
- 2026 Budapest Formula 3 round

Previous round: 2026 Spa-Francorchamps Formula 2 round	FIA Formula 2 Championship; 2026 season	Next round: 2026 Monza Formula 2 round
Previous round: 2025 Budapest Formula 2 round	Budapest Formula 2 round	Next round: 2027 Budapest Formula 2 round
