= 2026 Monza Formula 2 round =

Motor racing event in Monza, Italy

(Italy) 2026 Monza Formula 2 round
Round details
- Round 10 of 14 in the 2026 FIA Formula 2 Championship.
- Location: Monza Circuit; Monza, Italy
- Course: Permanent racing facility 5.793 km (3.600 mi)

Sprint Race
- Date: 5 September 2026
- Laps: 21
Podium
First	(Paraguay) Joshua Dürksen	Invicta Racing
Second	(United Kingdom) John Bennett	Trident
Third	(Germany) Oliver Goethe	MP Motorsport
Fastest lap
Driver	(Paraguay) Joshua Dürksen	Invicta Racing
- Time: 1:33.616 (on lap 13)

Feature Race
- Date: 6 September 2026
- Laps: 30
Pole position
Driver	(Brazil) Rafael Câmara	Invicta Racing
Time	1:31.326	
Podium
First	(Paraguay) Joshua Dürksen	Invicta Racing
Second	(Brazil) Rafael Câmara	Invicta Racing
Third	(Mexico) Noel León	Campos Racing
Fastest lap
Driver	(Brazil) Rafael Câmara	Invicta Racing
- Time: 1:32.884 (on lap 22)

The 2026 Monza FIA Formula 2 round was a motor racing event held between 4 and 6 September 2026 at the Monza Circuit. It was the tenth round of the 2026 FIA Formula 2 Championship and was held in support of the 2026 Italian Grand Prix.

== Classification ==
=== Qualifying ===
Qualifying was held on 4 September 2026 at 14:55 local time (UTC+2).

Pos.	No.	Driver	Entrant	Time/Gap	Grid SR	Grid FR
1	1	(Brazil) Rafael Câmara	Invicta Racing	1:31.326	9	1
2	2	(Paraguay) Joshua Dürksen	Invicta Racing	+0.057	7	2
3	15	(Republic of Ireland) Alex Dunne	Rodin Motorsport	+0.146	6	3
4	5	(Mexico) Noel León	Campos Racing	+0.255	10^{1}	7^{1}
5	14	(Norway) Martinius Stenshorne	Rodin Motorsport	+0.349	5	4
6	6	(Bulgaria) Nikola Tsolov	Campos Racing	+0.410	8^{2}	9^{2}
7	17	(Thailand) Tasanapol Inthraphuvasak	ART Grand Prix	+0.522	4	5
8	3	(Japan) Ritomo Miyata	Hitech	+0.550	3	6
9	10	(Germany) Oliver Goethe	MP Motorsport	+0.677	2	8
10	25	(United Kingdom) John Bennett	Trident	+0.712	1	10
11	9	(Italy) Gabriele Minì	MP Motorsport	+0.745	14^{3}	14^{3}
12	8	(Poland) Roman Bilinski	DAMS Lucas Oil	+0.773	11	11
13	12	(Spain) Mari Boya	Prema Racing	+0.773	16^{4}	16^{4}
14	11	(Colombia) Sebastián Montoya	Prema Racing	+0.781	17^{1}	17^{1}
15	23	(Mexico) Rafael Villagómez	Van Amersfoort Racing	+0.904	12	12
16	7	(Sweden) Dino Beganovic	DAMS Lucas Oil	+0.910	19^{1}	19^{1}
17	22	(Argentina) Nico Varrone	Van Amersfoort Racing	+0.977	13	13
18	24	(Netherlands) Laurens van Hoepen	Trident	+1.065	15	15
19	20	(Brazil) Emerson Fittipaldi Jr.	AIX Racing	+1.078	18	18
20	4	(United States) Colton Herta	Hitech	+1.083	20	20
21	16	(India) Kush Maini	ART Grand Prix	+1.087	22^{1}	22^{1}
22	21	(United Kingdom) Cian Shields	AIX Racing	+1.509	21	21

Notes:

- ^1 – Noel León, Dino Beganovic, Sebastián Montoya, and Kush Maini all received a three-place grid penalty for both races due to not following the Race Director Competition Notes.
- ^2 – Nikola Tsolov received a three-place grid penalty for weaving in an erratic manner. This dropped him from 5th to 8th on the sprint race grid, and from 6th to 9th on the feature race grid.
- ^3 – Gabriele Minì received a three-place grid penalty for impeding Cian Shields. This dropped Minì from 11th to 14th on the grid for both races.
- ^4 – Mari Boya received a three-place grid penalty for driving unnecessarily slowly. This dropped Boya from 13th to 16th on the grid for both races.

=== Sprint race ===
The sprint race was held on 5 September 2026 at 14:15 local time (UTC+2).

Pos.	No.	Driver	Entrant	Laps	Time/Retired	Grid	Points
1	2	(Paraguay) Joshua Dürksen	Invicta Racing	21	36:38.663	7	10+1
2	25	(United Kingdom) John Bennett	Trident	21	+1.263	1	8
3	10	(Germany) Oliver Goethe	MP Motorsport	21	+1.818	2	6
4	5	(Mexico) Noel León	Campos Racing	21	+2.284	10	5
5	6	(Bulgaria) Nikola Tsolov	Campos Racing	21	+3.708	8	4
6	14	(Norway) Martinius Stenshorne	Rodin Motorsport	21	+4.160	5	3
7	15	(Republic of Ireland) Alex Dunne	Rodin Motorsport	21	+4.306	6	2
8	24	(Netherlands) Laurens van Hoepen	Trident	21	+4.754	15	1
9	3	(Japan) Ritomo Miyata	Hitech	21	+5.241	3	
10	9	(Italy) Gabriele Minì	MP Motorsport	21	+5.492	14	
11	22	(Argentina) Nico Varrone	Van Amersfoort Racing	21	+5.695	13	
12	7	(Sweden) Dino Beganovic	DAMS Lucas Oil	21	+6.584	19	
13	12	(Spain) Mari Boya	Prema Racing	21	+7.235	16	
14	11	(Colombia) Sebastián Montoya	Prema Racing	21	+7.555	17	
15	4	(United States) Colton Herta	Hitech	21	+8.042	20	
16	20	(Brazil) Emerson Fittipaldi Jr.	AIX Racing	21	+8.574	18	
17	23	(Mexico) Rafael Villagómez	Van Amersfoort Racing	21	+8.861	12	
18	21	(United Kingdom) Cian Shields	AIX Racing	21	+9.104	21	
19	17	(Thailand) Tasanapol Inthraphuvasak	ART Grand Prix	21	+10.556	4	
20	16	(India) Kush Maini	ART Grand Prix	21	+12.176	22	
DNF	8	(Poland) Roman Bilinski	DAMS Lucas Oil	15	Accident	11	
DNF	1	(Brazil) Rafael Câmara	Invicta Racing	4	Accident	9	
Fastest lap: (Paraguay) Joshua Dürksen (1:33.616 on lap 13)

=== Feature race ===
The feature race was held on 6 September 2026 at 09:45 local time (UTC+2).

Pos.	No.	Driver	Entrant	Laps	Time/Retired	Grid	Points
1	2	(Paraguay) Joshua Dürksen	Invicta Racing	30	51:05.855	2	25
2	1	(Brazil) Rafael Câmara	Invicta Racing	30	+0.424	1	18+1+2
3	5	(Mexico) Noel León	Campos Racing	30	+4.647	7	15
4	25	(United Kingdom) John Bennett	Trident	30	+8.039	10	12
5	3	(Japan) Ritomo Miyata	Hitech	30	+8.375	6	10
6	15	(Republic of Ireland) Alex Dunne	Rodin Motorsport	30	+9.361	3	8
7	6	(Bulgaria) Nikola Tsolov	Campos Racing	30	+9.638	9	6
8	17	(Thailand) Tasanapol Inthraphuvasak	ART Grand Prix	30	+10.409	5	4
9	10	(Germany) Oliver Goethe	MP Motorsport	30	+14.265	8	2
10	22	(Argentina) Nico Varrone	Van Amersfoort Racing	30	+15.167	13	1
11	9	(Italy) Gabriele Minì	MP Motorsport	30	+15.954	14	
12	24	(Netherlands) Laurens van Hoepen	Trident	30	+16.598	15	
13	12	(Spain) Mari Boya	Prema Racing	30	+17.674	16	
14	7	(Sweden) Dino Beganovic	DAMS Lucas Oil	30	+20.612	19	
15	14	(Norway) Martinius Stenshorne	Rodin Motorsport	30	+21.060^{1}	4	
16	21	(United Kingdom) Cian Shields	AIX Racing	30	+24.534	21	
17	16	(India) Kush Maini	ART Grand Prix	30	+26.833	22	
18	11	(Colombia) Sebastián Montoya	Prema Racing	30	+27.946^{2}	17	
19	23	(Mexico) Rafael Villagómez	Van Amersfoort Racing	30	+30.029	12	
20	20	(Brazil) Emerson Fittipaldi Jr.	AIX Racing	30	+31.549	18	
21	8	(Poland) Roman Bilinski	DAMS Lucas Oil	30	+1:02.580	11	
DNF	4	(United States) Colton Herta	Hitech	10	Collision	20	
Fastest lap: (Brazil) Rafael Câmara (1:32.884 on lap 22)

Notes:

- ^1 – Martinius Stenshorne received a ten-second time penalty for forcing Nico Varrone off the track.
- ^2 – Sebastián Montoya received a ten-second time penalty for causing a collision with Colton Herta. The penalty dropped Montoya from 14th to 18th in the final classification.

== Standings after the event ==
Drivers' Championship standings

	Pos.	Driver	Points
	1	(Bulgaria) Nikola Tsolov	177
1	2	(Brazil) Rafael Câmara	166
1	3	(Italy) Gabriele Minì	147
	4	(Republic of Ireland) Alex Dunne	118
	5	(Mexico) Noel León	114

Teams' Championship standings

Pos.	Team	Points
1	(Spain) Campos Racing	291
2	(United Kingdom) Invicta Racing	244
3	(Netherlands) MP Motorsport	184
4	(New Zealand) Rodin Motorsport	180
5	(France) ART Grand Prix	151

Note: Only the top five positions are included for both sets of standings.

== See also ==
- 2026 Italian Grand Prix
- 2026 Monza Formula 3 round

Previous round: 2026 Budapest Formula 2 round	FIA Formula 2 Championship; 2026 season	Next round: 2026 Madrid Formula 2 round
Previous round: 2025 Monza Formula 2 round	Monza Formula 2 round	Next round: 2027 Monza Formula 2 round
