= 2025 Lusail Formula 2 round =

Motor racing event in Lusail, Qatar

(Qatar) 2025 Lusail Formula 2 round
Round details
- Round 13 of 14 in the 2025 FIA Formula 2 Championship.
- Location: Lusail International Circuit, Lusail, Qatar
- Course: Permanent racing facility 5.419 km (3.367 mi)

Sprint Race
- Date: 29 November 2025
- Laps: 23
Podium
First	(Netherlands) Richard Verschoor	MP Motorsport
Second	(Paraguay) Joshua Dürksen	AIX Racing
Third	(Mexico) Rafael Villagómez	Van Amersfoort Racing
Fastest lap
Driver	(Netherlands) Richard Verschoor	MP Motorsport
- Time: 1:39.603 (on lap 19)

Feature Race
- Date: 30 November 2025
- Laps: 32
Pole position
Driver	(Italy) Leonardo Fornaroli (Note: Oliver Goethe set the fastest time in qualifying, but later received a three-place grid penalty for impeding another driver. Leonardo Fornaroli was promoted to pole position in his place.)	Invicta Racing
Time	1:36.155	
Podium
First	(France) Victor Martins	ART Grand Prix
Second	(Italy) Leonardo Fornaroli	Invicta Racing
Third	(Republic of Ireland) Alex Dunne	Rodin Motorsport
Fastest lap
Driver	(Sweden) Dino Beganovic	Hitech TGR
- Time: 1:38.516 (on lap 29)

The 2025 Lusail FIA Formula 2 round was a motor racing event held between 28 and 30 November 2025 at the Lusail International Circuit, Lusail, Qatar. It was the penultimate race of the 2025 FIA Formula 2 Championship and was held in support of the 2025 Qatar Grand Prix.

Leonardo Fornaroli clinched the Drivers' Championship after finishing second in the feature race, winning back-to-back Formula 3 and Formula 2 titles.

== Classification ==
=== Qualifying ===
Qualifying was held on 28 November 2025 at 19:10 local time (UTC+3).

Pos.	No.	Driver	Entrant	Time/Gap	Grid SR	Grid FR
1	5	(Germany) Oliver Goethe	MP Motorsport	1:36.115	13^{1}	4^{1}
2	1	(Italy) Leonardo Fornaroli	Invicta Racing	+0.040	9	1
3	14	(France) Victor Martins	ART Grand Prix	+0.170	8	2
4	2	(Czech Republic) Roman Staněk	Invicta Racing	+0.230	7	3
5	17	(Republic of Ireland) Alex Dunne	Rodin Motorsport	+0.327	6	5
6	9	(Colombia) Sebastián Montoya	Prema Racing	+0.626	5	6
7	3	(Bulgaria) Nikola Tsolov	Campos Racing	+0.649	4	7
8	25	(Mexico) Rafael Villagómez	Van Amersfoort Racing	+0.651	3	8
9	20	(Paraguay) Joshua Dürksen	AIX Racing	+0.658	2	9
10	6	(Netherlands) Richard Verschoor	MP Motorsport	+0.678	1	10
11	8	(Sweden) Dino Beganovic	Hitech TGR	+0.711	10	11
12	16	(Norway) Martinius Stenshorne	Rodin Motorsport	+0.772	11	12
13	24	(United Kingdom) John Bennett	Van Amersfoort Racing	+0.919	12	13
14	10	(Italy) Gabriele Minì	Prema Racing	+0.924	14	14
15	11	(United States) Jak Crawford	DAMS Lucas Oil	+1.057	15	15
16	15	(Japan) Ritomo Miyata	ART Grand Prix	+1.079	16	16
17	4	(United Kingdom) Arvid Lindblad	Campos Racing	+1.202	17	17
18	7	(United Kingdom) Luke Browning	Hitech TGR	+1.219	18	18
19	21	(United Kingdom) Cian Shields	AIX Racing	+1.983	19	19
20	12	(India) Kush Maini	DAMS Lucas Oil	+2.088	20	20
21	23	(Australia) James Wharton	Trident	+2.782	21	21
22	22	(Netherlands) Laurens van Hoepen	Trident	+2.918	22	22

Notes:

- ^1Oliver Goethe received a three-place grid penalty for both races as he impeded Martinius Stenshorne. Due to the penalty, Leonardo Fornaroli was promoted to pole position for the feature race.

=== Sprint race ===
The sprint race was held on 29 November 2025 at 19:20 local time (UTC+3).

Pos.	No.	Driver	Entrant	Laps	Time/Retired	Grid	Points
1	6	(Netherlands) Richard Verschoor	MP Motorsport	23	42:36.481	1	10+1
2	20	(Paraguay) Joshua Dürksen	AIX Racing	23	+0.970	2	8
3	25	(Mexico) Rafael Villagómez	Van Amersfoort Racing	23	+1.607	3	6
4	9	(Colombia) Sebastián Montoya	Prema Racing	23	+2.120	5	5
5	17	(Republic of Ireland) Alex Dunne	Rodin Motorsport	23	+2.347	6	4
6	1	(Italy) Leonardo Fornaroli	Invicta Racing	23	+2.880	9	3
7	16	(Norway) Martinius Stenshorne	Rodin Motorsport	23	+3.933	11	2
8	11	(United States) Jak Crawford	DAMS Lucas Oil	23	+4.265	15	1
9	8	(Sweden) Dino Beganovic	Hitech TGR	23	+4.548	10	
10	3	(Bulgaria) Nikola Tsolov	Campos Racing	23	+6.490	4	
11	14	(France) Victor Martins	ART Grand Prix	23	+6.737	8	
12	10	(Italy) Gabriele Minì	Prema Racing	23	+7.030	14	
13	2	(Czech Republic) Roman Staněk	Invicta Racing	23	+7.399	7	
14	5	(Germany) Oliver Goethe	MP Motorsport	23	+7.728	13	
15	24	(United Kingdom) John Bennett	Van Amersfoort Racing	23	+8.312	12	
16	15	(Japan) Ritomo Miyata	ART Grand Prix	23	+8.948	16	
17	7	(United Kingdom) Luke Browning	Hitech TGR	23	+9.959	18	
18	4	(United Kingdom) Arvid Lindblad	Campos Racing	23	+10.068	17	
19	22	(Netherlands) Laurens van Hoepen	Trident	23	+20.164^{1}	22	
DNF	21	(United Kingdom) Cian Shields	AIX Racing	19	Accident	19	
DNF	12	(India) Kush Maini	DAMS Lucas Oil	14	Technical issue	20	
DNF	23	(Australia) James Wharton	Trident	13	Collision	21	
Fastest lap: (Netherlands) Richard Verschoor (1:39.603 on lap 19)

Notes:

- ^1Laurens van Hoepen was handed a ten-second time penalty for causing a collision with James Wharton. This did not affect van Hoepen's classification.

=== Feature race ===
The feature race was held on 30 November 2025 at 15:10 local time (UTC+3).

Pos.	No.	Driver	Entrant	Laps	Time/Retired	Grid	Points
1	14	(France) Victor Martins	ART Grand Prix	32	55:18.455	2	25
2	1	(Italy) Leonardo Fornaroli	Invicta Racing	32	+1.265	1	18+2
3	17	(Republic of Ireland) Alex Dunne	Rodin Motorsport	32	+7.439^{1}	5	15
4	4	(United Kingdom) Arvid Lindblad	Campos Racing	32	+8.703	17	12
5	9	(Colombia) Sebastián Montoya	Prema Racing	32	+10.105	6	10
6	6	(Netherlands) Richard Verschoor	MP Motorsport	32	+12.362	10	8
7	3	(Bulgaria) Nikola Tsolov	Campos Racing	32	+15.959^{1}	7	6
8	2	(Czech Republic) Roman Staněk	Invicta Racing	32	+17.979	3	4
9	8	(Sweden) Dino Beganovic	Hitech TGR	32	+18.487	11	2+1
10	7	(United Kingdom) Luke Browning	Hitech TGR	32	+23.535	18	1
11	11	(United States) Jak Crawford	DAMS Lucas Oil	32	+28.151	15	
12	25	(Mexico) Rafael Villagómez	Van Amersfoort Racing	32	+32.691	8	
13	10	(Italy) Gabriele Minì	Prema Racing	32	+33.196	14	
14	20	(Paraguay) Joshua Dürksen	AIX Racing	32	+35.889	9	
15	16	(Norway) Martinius Stenshorne	Rodin Motorsport	32	+37.092^{2}	12	
16	12	(India) Kush Maini	DAMS Lucas Oil	32	+37.748	20	
17	24	(United Kingdom) John Bennett	Van Amersfoort Racing	32	+41.585	13	
18	22	(Netherlands) Laurens van Hoepen	Trident	32	+42.714	22	
19	23	(Australia) James Wharton	Trident	32	+54.320^{3}	21	
20	21	(United Kingdom) Cian Shields	AIX Racing	32	+97.336	19	
DNF	5	(Germany) Oliver Goethe	MP Motorsport	13	Retired	4	
DNF	15	(Japan) Ritomo Miyata	ART Grand Prix	6	Retired	16	
Fastest lap: (Sweden) Dino Beganovic (1:38.516 on lap 29)

Notes:

- ^1Both Alex Dunne and Nikola Tsolov received a five-second time penalty for an unsafe release in the pit lane. This did not affect Dunne's classification. Tsolov was demoted from 6th to 7th.
- ^2Martinius Stenshorne was handed a ten-second time penalty for forcing Rafael Villagómez off track. This demoted Stenshorne from 11th to 15th.
- ^3James Wharton was given a ten-second time penalty for leaving the track and gaining an advantage over Luke Browning.

== Standings after the event ==
Drivers' Championship standings

	Pos.	Driver	Points
	1	(Italy) Leonardo Fornaroli	211
	2	(United States) Jak Crawford	170
1	3	(Netherlands) Richard Verschoor	170
1	4	(United Kingdom) Luke Browning	162
	5	(Republic of Ireland) Alex Dunne	149

Teams' Championship standings

Pos.	Team	Points
1	(United Kingdom) Invicta Racing	296
2	(United Kingdom) Hitech TGR	261
3	(Spain) Campos Racing	239
4	(France) DAMS Lucas Oil	196
5	(Netherlands) MP Motorsport	193

- Note: Only the top five positions are included for both sets of standings.
- Note: Bold names include the 2025 Drivers' Champion.

== See also ==
- 2025 Qatar Grand Prix

== Notes ==
Previous round: 2025 Baku Formula 2 round	FIA Formula 2 Championship; 2025 season	Next round: 2025 Yas Island Formula 2 round
Previous round: 2024 Lusail Formula 2 round	Lusail Formula 2 round	Next round: 2026 Lusail Formula 2 round
