= Invicta Racing =

British auto racing team

(United Kingdom) Invicta Racing
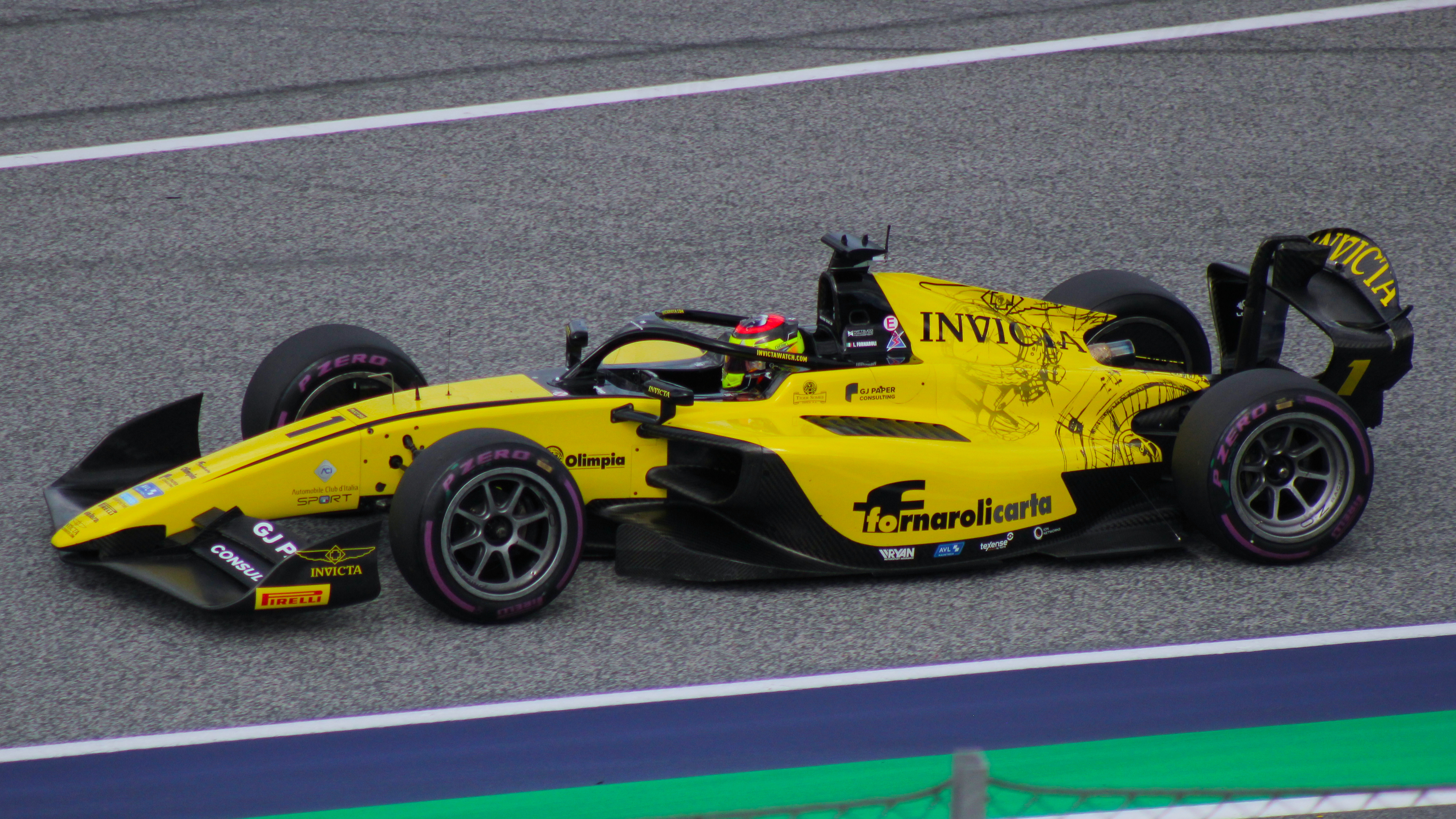
- Founded: 2024
- Founder(s): Invicta Watch Group; Eyal Lalo (Owner and Chairman)
- Base: Attleborough, Norfolk, England
- Team principal(s): James Robinson (CEO); Geoff Spear (Team Manager)
- Current series: FIA Formula 2 Championship; Formula Regional European Championship
- Current drivers: FIA Formula 2 Championship (Brazil) 1. Rafael Câmara (Paraguay) 2. Joshua Dürksen
- Teams' Championships: FIA Formula 2 Championship: 2024; 2025
- Drivers' Championships: FIA Formula 2 Championship: 2024: Gabriel Bortoleto; 2025: Leonardo Fornaroli
- Website: https://invictaracing.com/

Invicta Racing is a British auto racing team competing in the FIA Formula 2 Championship. Owned by the Invicta Watch Group, it started racing in 2024 by gradually absorbing Virtuosi Racing's Formula 2 team, a process it completed in 2025.

== History ==
Invicta Racing traces its origins back to a title sponsorship deal inked by FIA Formula 2 Championship team Virtuosi Racing and watch company Invicta in 2023. Initially competing as Invicta Virtuosi Racing, the partnership yielded three victories for Jack Doohan in the 2023 Formula 2 season.

In December 2023, Invicta announced that it had purchased an ownership stake in the team, marking the birth of Invicta Racing while Virtuosi still controlled the outfit's operations. With Jack Doohan graduating to a test and reserve driver role with the Alpine F1 Team and Amaury Cordeel switching to Hitech, the team had a brand new driver lineup for 2024 in Indian Alpine junior Kush Maini and reigning FIA Formula 3 champion Gabriel Bortoleto. It proved to be a breakthrough season for both parties, as Bortoleto collected two wins and narrowly beat Campos Racing's Isack Hadjar to the title in his rookie year, earning a promotion to Formula One with Sauber. Maini's points in turn helped Invicta clinch the teams' championship.

In March 2025, Invicta completed acquisition of the Formula 2 squad and fully split from Virtuosi. The outfit subsequently underwent management changes, with James Robinson appointed as CEO and team principal in place of Andy Roche, who remained a consultant, while senior engineer Geoff Spear became team manager. For its first independent season, Invicta Racing signed 2024 FIA Formula 3 champion Leonardo Fornaroli along with F2 veteran Roman Staněk. Leonardo Fornaroli won the 2025 FIA Formula 2 Championship

== Current series results ==
=== FIA Formula 2 Championship ===
Year	Chassis	Engine	Tyres	Drivers	Races	Wins	Poles	F. Laps	Podiums	D.C.	Pts	T.C.	Pts
2024	Dallara; F2 2024	Mecachrome; V634T V6 t	P	(India) Kush Maini	28	1	1	1	5	13th	74	1st	288.5
2024	Dallara; F2 2024	Mecachrome; V634T V6 t	P	(Brazil) Gabriel Bortoleto	28	2	2	2	8	1st	214.5	1st	288.5
2025	Dallara; F2 2024	Mecachrome; V634T V6 t	P	(Italy) Leonardo Fornaroli	27	4	3	0	9	1st	211	1st	316
2025	Dallara; F2 2024	Mecachrome; V634T V6 t	P	(Czech Republic) Roman Staněk	27	1	2	0	5	10th	105	1st	316
2026	Dallara; F2 2024	Mecachrome; V634T V6 t	P	(Brazil) Rafael Câmara	25	3	5	5	7	1st	207	2nd	297*
2026	Dallara; F2 2024	Mecachrome; V634T V6 t	P	(Paraguay) Joshua Dürksen	25	4	0	1	4	8th	90	2nd	297*

* Season still in progress.

==== In detail ====
(key)

Year	Drivers	1	2	3	4	5	6	7	8	9	10	11	12	13	14	15	16	17	18	19	20	21	22	23	24	25	26	27	28	29	T.C.	Points
2024		BHR; SPR	BHR; FEA	JED; SPR	JED; FEA	ALB; SPR	ALB; FEA	IMO; SPR	IMO; FEA	MCO; SPR	MCO; FEA	CAT; SPR	CAT; FEA	RBR; SPR	RBR; FEA	SIL; SPR	SIL; FEA	HUN; SPR	HUN; FEA	SPA; SPR	SPA; FEA	MNZ; SPR	MNZ; FEA	BAK; SPR	BAK; FEA	LUS; SPR	LUS; FEA	YAS; SPR	YAS; FEA		1st	288.5
2024	(India) Kush Maini	13	7	8	2^{P}	3	12	8	14	Ret	17	2	6	7	17	3	19	1	7	13	15	11	15^{F}	9	DSQ	20†	14	17	12		1st	288.5
2024	(Brazil) Gabriel Bortoleto	6	5^{P}	10	Ret	Ret	Ret	6	2^{P}	2	8	5	10	4	1	4	6	16^{F}	4	10	2	8	1	5	4^{F}	5	3	2	2		1st	288.5
2025		ALB; SPR	ALB; FEA	BHR; SPR	BHR; FEA	JED; SPR	JED; FEA	IMO; SPR	IMO; FEA	MCO; SPR	MCO; FEA	CAT; SPR	CAT; FEA	RBR; SPR	RBR; FEA	SIL; SPR	SIL; FEA	SPA; SPR	SPA; FEA	HUN; SPR	HUN; FEA	MNZ; SPR	MNZ; FEA	BAK; SPR	BAK; FEA	LUS; SPR	LUS; FEA	YAS; SPR	YAS; FEA		1st	316
2025	(Italy) Leonardo Fornaroli	2	C	8	3^{P}	7	4	7	5	7	2	7	21†	16†	2^{P}	1	6	1	5	5	1	1	5	5	5	6	2^{P}	17	11		1st	316
2025	(Czech Republic) Roman Staněk	5	C	15	17	5	12	8	17	11	7	17	11	3	8	3	Ret	6	1	13	2^{P}	5	Ret	11	13	13	8	10	2^{P}		1st	316
2026		ALB; SPR	ALB; FEA	MIA; SPR	MIA; FEA	MTL; SPR	MTL; FEA	MCO; SPR	MCO; FEA	CAT; SPR	CAT; FEA	RBR; SPR	RBR; FEA	SIL; SPR	SIL; FEA	SPA; SPR	SPA; FEA	HUN; SPR	HUN; FEA	MNZ; SPR	MNZ; FEA	MAD; SPR	MAD; FEA	BAK; SPR	BAK; FE1	BAK; FE2	LUS; SPR	LUS; FEA	YAS; SPR	YAS; FEA	2nd	297*
2026	(Brazil) Rafael Câmara	11	2	10	3^{F}	7	14	8	Ret^{P}	6	1^{P}	9^{F}	4	10	5^{P}	6	1^{P F}	4	3	Ret	2^{P F}	6	10	15^{F}	4	1					2nd	297*
2026	(Paraguay) Joshua Dürksen	1	10	5	10	Ret	11	4	15	20	14	Ret	9	8	9	1	14	7	8	1^{F}	1	14	4	Ret	Ret	13					2nd	297*

* Season still in progress.

== Timeline ==
Current series
FIA Formula 2 Championship	2024–present
Formula Regional European Championship	2027–present
