= 2025 Monza Formula 2 round =

Motor racing event

(Italy) 2025 Monza Formula 2 round
Round details
- Round 11 of 14 in the 2025 FIA Formula 2 Championship.
- Layout of Monza Circuit
- Location: Monza Circuit; Monza, Italy
- Course: Permanent racing facility 5.793 km (3.599 mi)

Sprint Race
- Date: 6 September 2025
- Laps: 21
Podium
First	(Italy) Leonardo Fornaroli	Invicta Racing
Second	(United Kingdom) Arvid Lindblad	Campos Racing
Third	(Paraguay) Joshua Dürksen	AIX Racing
Fastest lap
Driver	(Germany) Oliver Goethe	MP Motorsport
- Time: 1:33.658 (on lap 21)

Feature Race
- Date: 7 September 2025
- Laps: 30
Pole position
Driver	(United Kingdom) Luke Browning	Hitech TGR
Time	1:32.390	
Podium
First	(United Kingdom) Luke Browning	Hitech TGR
Second	(Paraguay) Joshua Dürksen	AIX Racing
Third	(Spain) Pepe Martí	Campos Racing
Fastest lap
Driver	(Germany) Oliver Goethe	MP Motorsport
- Time: 1:33.259 (on lap 30)

The 2025 Monza Formula 2 round was a motor racing event held between 5 September and 7 September 2025 at the Monza Circuit. It was the eleventh round of the 2025 Formula 2 Championship and was held in support of the 2025 Italian Grand Prix.

== Classification ==
=== Qualifying ===
Qualifying was held on 5 September 2025, at 15:55 local time (UTC+2).

Pos.	No.	Driver	Entrant	Time/Gap	Grid SR	Grid FR
1	7	(United Kingdom) Luke Browning	Hitech TGR	1:32.390	10	1
2	12	(India) Kush Maini	DAMS Lucas Oil	+0.318	9	2
3	2	(Czech Republic) Roman Staněk	Invicta Racing	+0.364	8	3
4	5	(Germany) Oliver Goethe	MP Motorsport	+0.427	7	4
5	17	(Republic of Ireland) Alex Dunne	Rodin Motorsport	+0.461	6	5
6	4	(United Kingdom) Arvid Lindblad	Campos Racing	+0.491	5	6
7	20	(Paraguay) Joshua Dürksen	AIX Racing	+0.573	4	7
8	1	(Italy) Leonardo Fornaroli	Invicta Racing	+0.603	3	8
9	22	(France) Sami Meguetounif	Trident	+0.607	2	9
10	8	(Sweden) Dino Beganovic	Hitech TGR	+0.629	1	10
11	11	(United States) Jak Crawford	DAMS Lucas Oil	+0.674	11	11
12	14	(France) Victor Martins	ART Grand Prix	+0.679	12	12
13	3	(Spain) Pepe Martí	Campos Racing	+0.758	13	13
14	6	(Netherlands) Richard Verschoor	MP Motorsport	+0.785^{1}	14	14
15	10	(Italy) Gabriele Minì	Prema Racing	+0.805	15	15
16	25	(Mexico) Rafael Villagómez	Van Amersfoort Racing	+0.856	16	16
17	24	(United Kingdom) John Bennett	Van Amersfoort Racing	+1.168	17	17
18	15	(Japan) Ritomo Miyata	ART Grand Prix	+1.182	18	18
19	21	(United Kingdom) Cian Shields	AIX Racing	+1.203	19	19
20	16	(Belgium) Amaury Cordeel	Rodin Motorsport	+1.277	20	20
107% time: 1:38.857
—	23	(United States) Max Esterson	Trident	+7.562^{2}	22	22
—	9	(Colombia) Sebastián Montoya	Prema Racing	+13.083^{2}	21	21

Notes:

- ^1 Richard Verschoor's fastest lap time was deleted as he was the sole cause of a red flag during qualifying.
- ^2 Max Esterson and Sebastián Montoya both failed to set a lap time within 107% of the fastest driver. The two drivers were permitted to start both races from the back of the grid.

=== Sprint race ===
The sprint race was held on 6 September 2025, at 14:15 local time (UTC+2).

Pos.	No.	Driver	Entrant	Laps	Time/Retired	Grid	Points
1	1	(Italy) Leonardo Fornaroli	Invicta Racing	21	35:26.925	3	10
2	4	(United Kingdom) Arvid Lindblad	Campos Racing	21	+1.662	5	8+1
3	20	(Paraguay) Joshua Dürksen	AIX Racing	21	+11.067	4	6
4	6	(Netherlands) Richard Verschoor	MP Motorsport	21	+12.524	14	5
5	2	(Czech Republic) Roman Staněk	Invicta Racing	21	+13.088	8	4
6	8	(Sweden) Dino Beganovic	Hitech TGR	21	+13.700^{1}	1	3
7	10	(Italy) Gabriele Minì	Prema Racing	21	+17.535	15	2
8	7	(United Kingdom) Luke Browning	Hitech TGR	21	+17.951	10	1
9	3	(Spain) Pepe Martí	Campos Racing	21	+18.233	13	
10	9	(Colombia) Sebastián Montoya	Prema Racing	21	+19.801	21	
11	15	(Japan) Ritomo Miyata	ART Grand Prix	21	+21.337	18	
12	25	(Mexico) Rafael Villagómez	Van Amersfoort Racing	21	+28.836	16	
13	17	(Republic of Ireland) Alex Dunne	Rodin Motorsport	21	+30.678^{2}	6	
14	24	(United Kingdom) John Bennett	Van Amersfoort Racing	21	+31.825	17	
15	21	(United Kingdom) Cian Shields	AIX Racing	21	+32.381	19	
16	11	(United States) Jak Crawford	DAMS Lucas Oil	21	+34.531	11	
17	16	(Belgium) Amaury Cordeel	Rodin Motorsport	21	+35.049	20	
18	5	(Germany) Oliver Goethe	MP Motorsport	21	+1:09.303	7	
19	14	(France) Victor Martins	ART Grand Prix	21	+1:11.886	12	
DNF	23	(United States) Max Esterson	Trident	16	Retired	22	
DNF	22	(France) Sami Meguetounif	Trident	9	Accident damage	2	
DNF	12	(India) Kush Maini	DAMS Lucas Oil	1	Accident	9	
Fastest lap: (Germany) Oliver Goethe (1:33.658 on lap 21)^{3}

Notes:

- ^1 Dino Beganovic received a five-second time penalty for a virtual safety car infringement. This demoted him from 3rd to 6th.
- ^2 Alex Dunne received a ten-second time penalty for forcing Kush Maini off the track. This demoted him from 11th to 13th.
- ^3 Oliver Goethe set the fastest lap of the race, but did not finish within the top ten, so was ineligible to score the bonus point. Arvid Lindblad set the fastest lap within the top ten and therefore received the bonus point.

=== Feature race ===
The feature race was held on 7 September 2025, at 09:45 local time (UTC+2).

Pos.	No.	Driver	Entrant	Laps	Time/Retired	Grid	Points
1	7	(United Kingdom) Luke Browning	Hitech TGR	30	53:52.454	1	25
2	20	(Paraguay) Joshua Dürksen	AIX Racing	30	+3.560	7	18
3	3	(Spain) Pepe Martí	Campos Racing	30	+3.913	13	15
4	25	(Mexico) Rafael Villagómez	Van Amersfoort Racing	30	+4.091	16	12
5	1	(Italy) Leonardo Fornaroli	Invicta Racing	30	+4.767	8	10
6	8	(Sweden) Dino Beganovic	Hitech TGR	30	+4.844	9	8+1
7	10	(Italy) Gabriele Minì	Prema Racing	30	+10.784	15	6
8	6	(Netherlands) Richard Verschoor	MP Motorsport	30	+11.590	14	4
9	9	(Colombia) Sebastián Montoya	Prema Racing	30	+12.100	21	2
10	24	(United Kingdom) John Bennett	Van Amersfoort Racing	30	+14.883	17	1
11	11	(United States) Jak Crawford	DAMS Lucas Oil	30	+15.592	10	
12	12	(India) Kush Maini	DAMS Lucas Oil	30	+16.280	2	
13	16	(Belgium) Amaury Cordeel	Rodin Motorsport	30	+17.057	20	
14	15	(Japan) Ritomo Miyata	ART Grand Prix	30	+17.687	18	
15	23	(United States) Max Esterson	Trident	30	+30.836	22	
16	5	(Germany) Oliver Goethe	MP Motorsport	30	+59.214	4	
DNF	22	(France) Sami Meguetounif	Trident	13	Accident	12^{1}	
DNF	14	(France) Victor Martins	ART Grand Prix	11	Retired	11	
DNF	4	(United Kingdom) Arvid Lindblad	Campos Racing	11	Collision damage	6	
DNF	2	(Czech Republic) Roman Staněk	Invicta Racing	10	Collision	3	
DNF	21	(United Kingdom) Cian Shields	AIX Racing	10	Accident	19	
DNF	17	(Republic of Ireland) Alex Dunne	Rodin Motorsport	7	Collision	5	
Fastest lap: (Germany) Oliver Goethe (1:33.259 on lap 30)^{2}

Notes:

- ^1 Sami Meguetounif received a five-second time penalty in the sprint race for forcing Alex Dunne off the track. Because Meguetounif did not classify in the sprint race, his penalty was converted into a three-place grid penalty for the feature race. This demoted him from 9th to 12th on the grid.
- ^2 Oliver Goethe set the fastest lap of the race, but did not finish within the top ten, so was ineligible to score the bonus point. Dino Beganovic set the fastest lap within the top ten and therefore received the bonus point.

== Standings after the event ==
Drivers' Championship standings

	Pos.	Driver	Points
	1	(Italy) Leonardo Fornaroli	174
2	2	(United Kingdom) Luke Browning	153
	3	(Netherlands) Richard Verschoor	144
2	4	(United States) Jak Crawford	137
	5	(Republic of Ireland) Alex Dunne	124

Teams' Championship standings

	Pos.	Team	Points
	1	(United Kingdom) Invicta Racing	255
1	2	(United Kingdom) Hitech TGR	223
1	3	(Spain) Campos Racing	213
1	4	(Netherlands) MP Motorsport	167
1	5	(France) DAMS Lucas Oil	163

Note: Only the top five positions are included for both sets of standings.

== See also ==
- 2025 Italian Grand Prix
- 2025 Monza Formula 3 round

Previous round: 2025 Budapest Formula 2 round	FIA Formula 2 Championship; 2025 season	Next round: 2025 Baku Formula 2 round
Previous round: 2024 Monza Formula 2 round	Monza Formula 2 round	Next round: 2026 Monza Formula 2 round
