= 2026 Silverstone Formula 2 round =

Motor racing event

(United Kingdom) 2026 Silverstone Formula 2 round
Round details
- Round 7 of 14 in the 2026 FIA Formula 2 Championship.
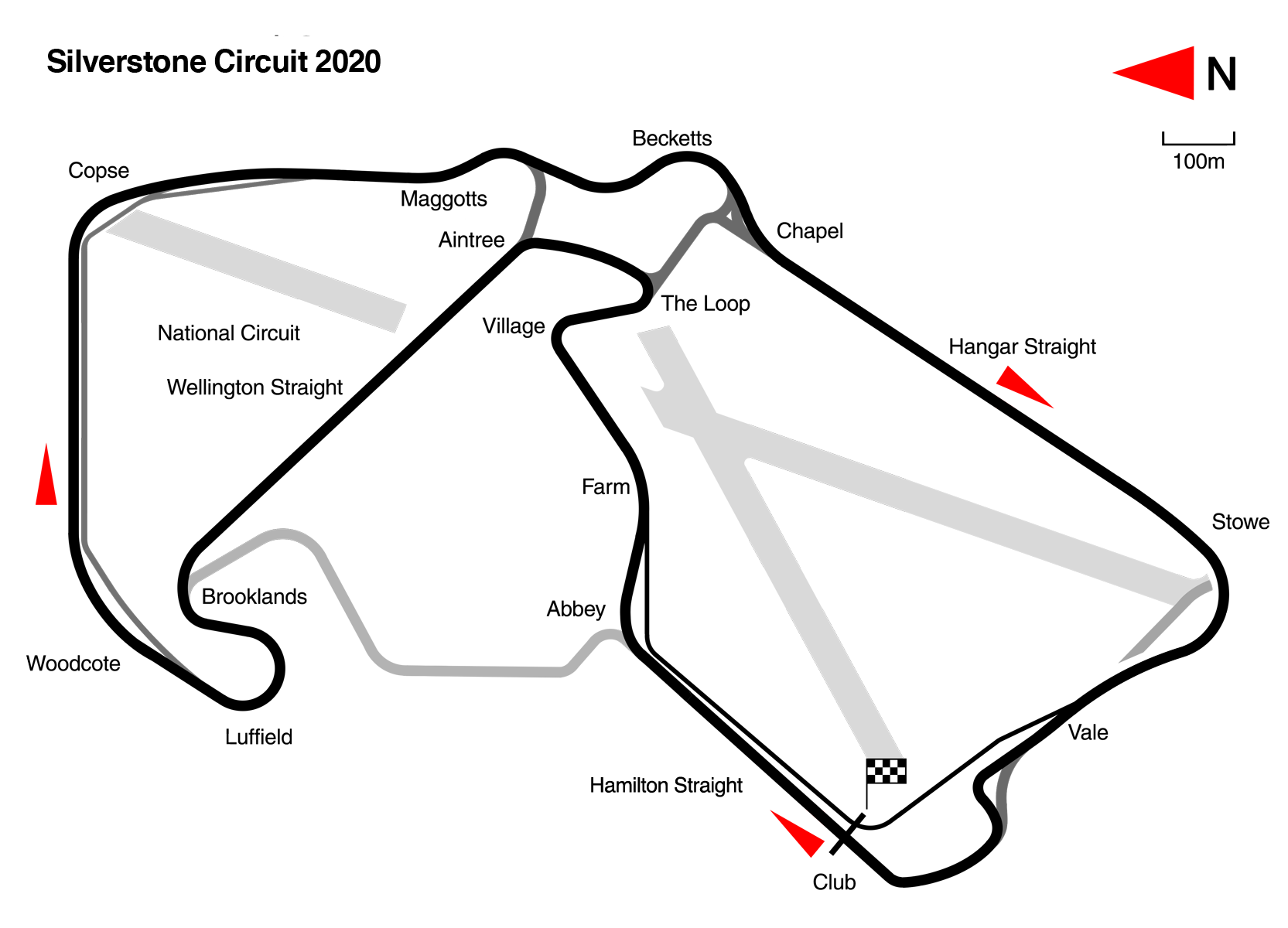
- Location: Silverstone Circuit; Silverstone, United Kingdom
- Course: Permanent racing facility 5.891 km (3.660 mi)

Sprint Race
- Date: 4 July 2026
- Laps: 21
Podium
First	(Bulgaria) Nikola Tsolov	Campos Racing
Second	(Italy) Gabriele Minì	MP Motorsport
Third	(Mexico) Rafael Villagómez	Van Amersfoort Racing
Fastest lap
Driver	(United Kingdom) Cian Shields	AIX Racing
- Time: 1:44.533 (on lap 9)

Feature Race
- Date: 5 July 2026
- Laps: 29
Pole position
Driver	(Brazil) Rafael Câmara	Invicta Racing
Time	1:39.690	
Podium
First	(Bulgaria) Nikola Tsolov	Campos Racing
Second	(Mexico) Rafael Villagómez	Van Amersfoort Racing
Third	(India) Kush Maini	ART Grand Prix
Fastest lap
Driver	(Mexico) Noel León	Campos Racing
- Time: 1:43.021 (on lap 27)

The 2026 Silverstone FIA Formula 2 round was a motor racing event held between 3 and 5 July 2026 at the Silverstone Circuit. It was the seventh round of the 2026 FIA Formula 2 Championship and was held in support of the 2026 British Grand Prix.

== Classification ==
=== Qualifying ===
Qualifying was held on 3 July 2026 at 14:55 local time (UTC+1).

Pos.	No.	Driver	Entrant	Time/Gap	Grid SR	Grid FR
1	1	(Brazil) Rafael Câmara	Invicta Racing	1:39.690	10	1
2	15	(Republic of Ireland) Alex Dunne	Rodin Motorsport	+0.201	9	2
3	16	(India) Kush Maini	ART Grand Prix	+0.202	8	3
4	8	(Poland) Roman Bilinski	DAMS Lucas Oil	+0.277	7	4
5	6	(Bulgaria) Nikola Tsolov	Campos Racing	+0.282	6	5
6	17	(Thailand) Tasanapol Inthraphuvasak	ART Grand Prix	+0.553	5	6
7	2	(Paraguay) Joshua Dürksen	Invicta Racing	+0.619	4	7
8	23	(Mexico) Rafael Villagómez	Van Amersfoort Racing	+0.638	3	8
9	3	(Japan) Ritomo Miyata	Hitech	+0.672	2	9
10	9	(Italy) Gabriele Minì	MP Motorsport	+0.692	1	10
11	7	(Sweden) Dino Beganovic	DAMS Lucas Oil	+0.771	11	11
12	12	(Spain) Mari Boya	Prema Racing	+0.780	12	12
13	10	(Germany) Oliver Goethe	MP Motorsport	+0.796	13	13
14	11	(Colombia) Sebastián Montoya	Prema Racing	+0.839	14	14
15	4	(United States) Colton Herta	Hitech	+0.849	15	15
16	5	(Mexico) Noel León	Campos Racing	+0.857	16	16
17	14	(Norway) Martinius Stenshorne	Rodin Motorsport	+0.858	17	17
18	25	(United Kingdom) John Bennett	Trident	+0.862	18	18
19	22	(Argentina) Nico Varrone	Van Amersfoort Racing	+0.891	19	19
20	24	(Netherlands) Laurens van Hoepen	Trident	+0.945	20	20
21	20	(Brazil) Emerson Fittipaldi Jr.	AIX Racing	+1.092	21	21
22	21	(United Kingdom) Cian Shields	AIX Racing	+1.282	22	22

=== Sprint race ===
The sprint race was held on 4 July 2026 at 13:45 local time (UTC+1).

Pos.	No.	Driver	Entrant	Laps	Time/Retired	Grid	Points
1	6	(Bulgaria) Nikola Tsolov	Campos Racing	21	41:04.635	6	10
2	9	(Italy) Gabriele Minì	MP Motorsport	21	+1.291	1	8
3	23	(Mexico) Rafael Villagómez	Van Amersfoort Racing	21	+1.698	3	6
4	16	(India) Kush Maini	ART Grand Prix	21	+3.012	8	5
5	17	(Thailand) Tasanapol Inthraphuvasak	ART Grand Prix	21	+6.693	5	4
6	7	(Sweden) Dino Beganovic	DAMS Lucas Oil	21	+8.830	11	3+1
7	8	(Poland) Roman Bilinski	DAMS Lucas Oil	21	+9.904	7	2
8	2	(Paraguay) Joshua Dürksen	Invicta Racing	21	+10.799	4	1
9	15	(Republic of Ireland) Alex Dunne	Rodin Motorsport	21	+11.627	9	
10	1	(Brazil) Rafael Câmara	Invicta Racing	21	+12.559	10	
11	3	(Japan) Ritomo Miyata	Hitech	21	+18.746	2	
12	5	(Mexico) Noel León	Campos Racing	21	+19.641	16	
13	12	(Spain) Mari Boya	Prema Racing	21	+23.405	12	
14	24	(Netherlands) Laurens van Hoepen	Trident	21	+23.645	20	
15	4	(United States) Colton Herta	Hitech	21	+23.924	15	
16	10	(Germany) Oliver Goethe	MP Motorsport	21	+25.882	13	
17	20	(Brazil) Emerson Fittipaldi Jr.	AIX Racing	21	+27.873	21	
18	22	(Argentina) Nico Varrone	Van Amersfoort Racing	21	+28.559^{1}	19	
19	21	(United Kingdom) Cian Shields	AIX Racing	21	+1:09.675	22	
20	14	(Norway) Martinius Stenshorne	Rodin Motorsport	21	+2:25.512^{2}	17	
DNF	11	(Colombia) Sebastián Montoya	Prema Racing	1	Collision	14	
DNF	25	(United Kingdom) John Bennett	Trident	1	Collision	18	
Fastest lap: (United Kingdom) Cian Shields (1:44.533 on lap 9)^{3}

Notes:

- ^1 – Nico Varrone received a five-second time penalty for causing a collision with Martinius Stenshorne.
- ^2 – Martinius Stenshorne received a ten-second time penalty for forcing Rafael Câmara off track.
- ^3 – Cian Shields set the fastest lap but did not finish in the top ten, so was ineligible to score the point for it. Dino Beganovic scored the point for setting the fastest lap among those finishing in the top ten.

=== Feature race ===
The feature race was held on 5 July 2026 at 11:15 local time (UTC+1).

Pos.	No.	Driver	Entrant	Laps	Time/Retired	Grid	Points
1	6	(Bulgaria) Nikola Tsolov	Campos Racing	29	51:22.101	5	25
2	23	(Mexico) Rafael Villagómez	Van Amersfoort Racing	29	+3.233	8	18
3	16	(India) Kush Maini	ART Grand Prix	29	+7.881	3	15
4	15	(Republic of Ireland) Alex Dunne	Rodin Motorsport	29	+8.501	2	12
5	1	(Brazil) Rafael Câmara	Invicta Racing	29	+9.032	1	10
6	9	(Italy) Gabriele Minì	MP Motorsport	29	+15.300	10	8
7	5	(Mexico) Noel León	Campos Racing	29	+15.658	16	6+1
8	8	(Poland) Roman Bilinski	DAMS Lucas Oil	29	+17.220	4	4
9	2	(Paraguay) Joshua Dürksen	Invicta Racing	29	+17.432	7	2
10	17	(Thailand) Tasanapol Inthraphuvasak	ART Grand Prix	29	+27.053	6	1
11	25	(United Kingdom) John Bennett	Trident	29	+29.138	18	
12	7	(Sweden) Dino Beganovic	DAMS Lucas Oil	29	+31.286	11	
13	22	(Argentina) Nico Varrone	Van Amersfoort Racing	29	+32.733	19	
14	3	(Japan) Ritomo Miyata	Hitech	29	+33.343	9	
15	12	(Spain) Mari Boya	Prema Racing	29	+33.467^{1}	12	
16	4	(United States) Colton Herta	Hitech	29	+33.754	15	
17	24	(Netherlands) Laurens van Hoepen	Trident	29	+35.269	20	
18	10	(Germany) Oliver Goethe	MP Motorsport	29	+35.431	13	
19	21	(United Kingdom) Cian Shields	AIX Racing	29	+43.121	22	
20	20	(Brazil) Emerson Fittipaldi Jr.	AIX Racing	29	+44.545	21	
DNF	11	(Colombia) Sebastián Montoya	Prema Racing	16	Collision damage	14	
DNS	14	(Norway) Martinius Stenshorne	Rodin Motorsport	0		17	
Fastest lap: (Mexico) Noel León (1:43.021 on lap 27)

Notes:

- ^1 – Mari Boya received a five-second time penalty for speeding in the pit lane.

== Standings after the event ==
Drivers' Championship standings

	Pos.	Driver	Points
1	1	(Bulgaria) Nikola Tsolov	141
1	2	(Italy) Gabriele Minì	124
	3	(Brazil) Rafael Câmara	94
	4	(Republic of Ireland) Alex Dunne	92
	5	(Mexico) Noel León	69

Teams' Championship standings

	Pos.	Team	Points
	1	(Spain) Campos Racing	210
	2	(Netherlands) MP Motorsport	152
	3	(New Zealand) Rodin Motorsport	140
	4	(United Kingdom) Invicta Racing	120
1	5	(France) ART Grand Prix	91

Note: Only the top five positions are included for both sets of standings.

== See also ==
- 2026 British Grand Prix
- 2026 Silverstone Formula 3 round

Previous round: 2026 Spielberg Formula 2 round	FIA Formula 2 Championship; 2026 season	Next round: 2026 Spa-Francorchamps Formula 2 round
Previous round: 2025 Silverstone Formula 2 round	Silverstone Formula 2 round	Next round: 2027 Silverstone Formula 2 round
