= 2025 Yas Island Formula 2 round =

Motor racing event in Abu Dhabi

(United Arab Emirates) 2025 Yas Island Formula 2 round
Round details
- Round 14 of 14 in the 2025 FIA Formula 2 Championship.
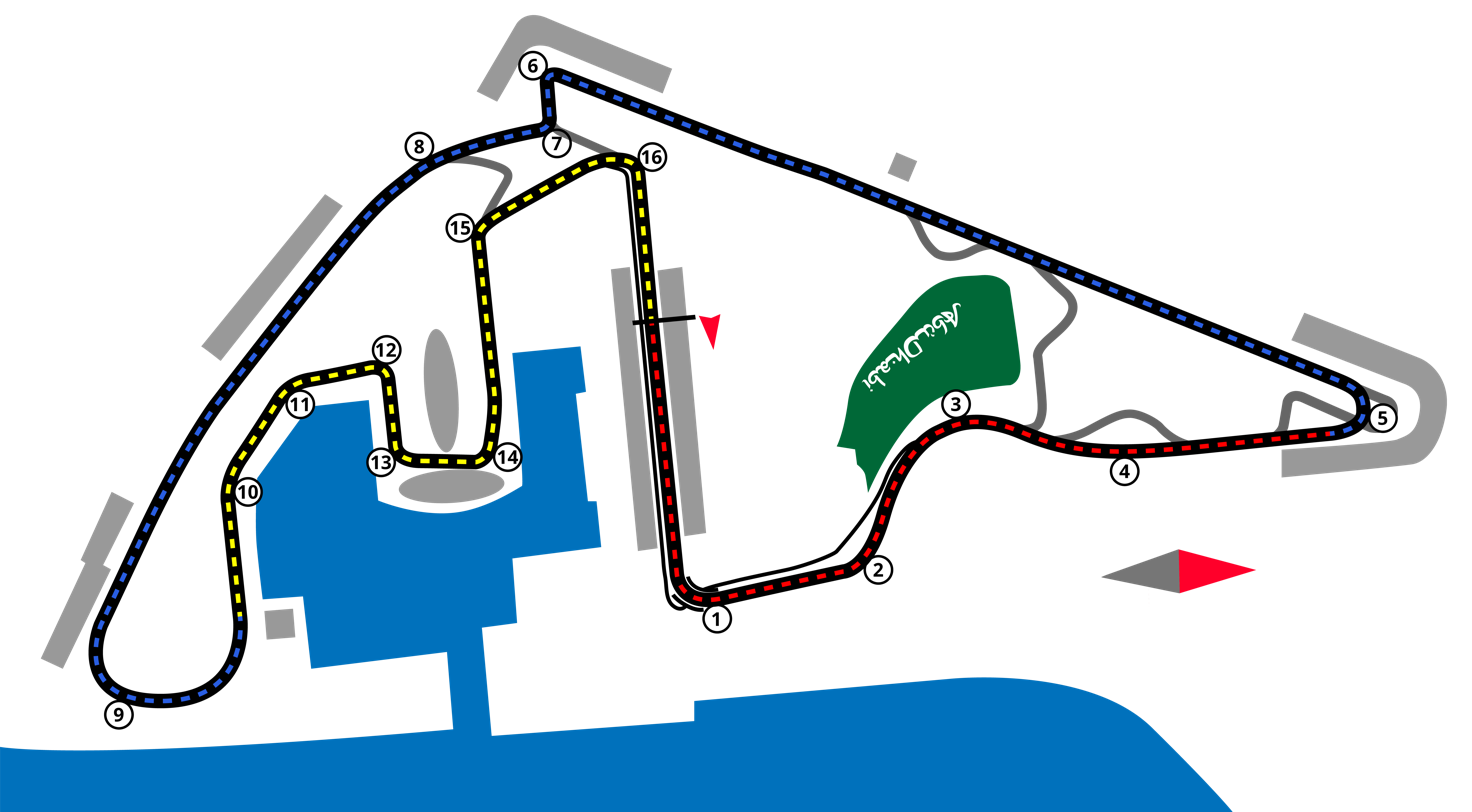
- Location: Yas Marina Circuit, Abu Dhabi, United Arab Emirates
- Course: Permanent Circuit; 5.281 km (3.281 mi)

Sprint race
- Date: 6 December 2025
- Laps: 23
Podium
First	(United Kingdom) Arvid Lindblad	Campos Racing
Second	(Paraguay) Joshua Dürksen	AIX Racing
Third	(Bulgaria) Nikola Tsolov	Campos Racing
Fastest lap
Driver	(United Kingdom) Luke Browning	Hitech TGR
- Time: 1:39.563 (on lap 22)

Feature race
- Date: 7 December 2025
- Laps: 33
Pole position
Driver	(Czech Republic) Roman Staněk	Invicta Racing
Time	1:36.836	
Podium
First	(Paraguay) Joshua Dürksen	AIX Racing
Second	(Czech Republic) Roman Staněk	Invicta Racing
Third	(Italy) Gabriele Minì	Prema Racing
Fastest lap
Driver	(United States) Jak Crawford	DAMS Lucas Oil
- Time: 1:38.818 (on 33)

The 2025 Yas Island Formula 2 round was a motor racing event that held between 5 and 7 December 2025 at the Yas Marina Circuit, Abu Dhabi, United Arab Emirates. It was the final race of the 2025 Formula 2 Championship and was held in support of the 2025 Abu Dhabi Grand Prix.

Invicta Racing won the Teams' Championship after Roman Staněk finished second in the feature race. As a result, Invicta became the second team to win both the Drivers' and Teams' Championship in back-to-back seasons.

== Classification ==
=== Qualifying ===
Qualifying was held on 5 December 2025 at 15:00 local time (UTC+4).

Pos.	No.	Driver	Entrant	Time/Gap	Grid SR	Grid FR
1	2	(Czech Republic) Roman Staněk	Invicta Racing	1:36.836	10	1
2	11	(United States) Jak Crawford	DAMS Lucas Oil	+0.087	9	2
3	1	(Italy) Leonardo Fornaroli	Invicta Racing	+0.134	8	3
4	8	(Sweden) Dino Beganovic	Hitech TGR	+0.188	7	4
5	9	(Colombia) Sebastián Montoya	Prema Racing	+0.204	6	5
6	5	(Germany) Oliver Goethe	MP Motorsport	+0.260	4	6
7	14	(France) Victor Martins	ART Grand Prix	+0.293	3	7
8	20	(Paraguay) Joshua Dürksen	AIX Racing	+0.316	2	8
9	3	(Bulgaria) Nikola Tsolov	Campos Racing	+0.395	5^{1}	12^{1}
10	4	(United Kingdom) Arvid Lindblad	Campos Racing	+0.411	1	9
11	17	(Republic of Ireland) Alex Dunne	Rodin Motorsport	+0.493	11	10
12	6	(Netherlands) Richard Verschoor	MP Motorsport	+0.604	12	11
13	10	(Italy) Gabriele Minì	Prema Racing	+0.649	13	13
14	15	(Japan) Ritomo Miyata	ART Grand Prix	+0.732	14	14
15	24	(United Kingdom) John Bennett	Van Amersfoort Racing	+0.775	15	15
16	25	(Mexico) Rafael Villagómez	Van Amersfoort Racing	+0.777	16	16
17	7	(United Kingdom) Luke Browning	Hitech TGR	+0.784	17	17
18	16	(Norway) Martinius Stenshorne	Rodin Motorsport	+0.855	18	18
19	22	(Netherlands) Laurens van Hoepen	Trident	+0.904	19	DNS
20	12	(India) Kush Maini	DAMS Lucas Oil	+1.240^{2}	20	20
21	21	(United Kingdom) Cian Shields	AIX Racing	+1.472	21	21
22	23	(Thailand) Tasanapol Inthraphuvasak	Trident	+2.865	22	22

Notes:

- ^1 Nikola Tsolov received a three-place grid penalty for both races as he impeded Luke Browning. The penalty dropped Tsolov from 2nd to 5th on the sprint race grid and from 9th to 12th on the feature race grid.
- ^2 Kush Maini had his times for laps 8 through 12 deleted due to having rear tyres that had been fitted to the incorrect side of the car. This did not affect Maini's classification.

=== Sprint race ===
The sprint race was held on 6 December 2025 at 16:15 local time (UTC+4).

Pos.	No.	Driver	Entrant	Laps	Time/Retired	Grid	Points
1	4	(United Kingdom) Arvid Lindblad	Campos Racing	23	39:15.648	1	10+1
2	20	(Paraguay) Joshua Dürksen	AIX Racing	23	+0.982	2	8
3	3	(Bulgaria) Nikola Tsolov	Campos Racing	23	+9.605	5	6
4	8	(Sweden) Dino Beganovic	Hitech TGR	23	+12.764	7	5
5	5	(Germany) Oliver Goethe	MP Motorsport	23	+15.637	4	4
6	11	(United States) Jak Crawford	DAMS Lucas Oil	23	+16.860	9	3
7	14	(France) Victor Martins	ART Grand Prix	23	+18.892	3	2
8	17	(Republic of Ireland) Alex Dunne	Rodin Motorsport	23	+20.887	11	1
9	10	(Italy) Gabriele Minì	Prema Racing	23	+23.525	13	
10	2	(Czech Republic) Roman Staněk	Invicta Racing	23	+24.322	10	
11	6	(Netherlands) Richard Verschoor	MP Motorsport	23	+26.315	12	
12	9	(Colombia) Sebastián Montoya	Prema Racing	23	+28.212	6	
13	15	(Japan) Ritomo Miyata	ART Grand Prix	23	+29.420	14	
14	22	(Netherlands) Laurens van Hoepen	Trident	23	+29.811	19	
15	25	(Mexico) Rafael Villagómez	Van Amersfoort Racing	23	+32.376	16	
16	12	(India) Kush Maini	DAMS Lucas Oil	23	+33.800	20	
17	1	(Italy) Leonardo Fornaroli	Invicta Racing	23	+35.506^{1}	8	
18	23	(Thailand) Tasanapol Inthraphuvasak	Trident	23	+36.726	22	
19	21	(United Kingdom) Cian Shields	AIX Racing	23	+51.412	21	
20	7	(United Kingdom) Luke Browning	Hitech TGR	23	+1:11.646	17	
21†	16	(Norway) Martinius Stenshorne	Rodin Motorsport	22	+1 lap^{2}	18	
DNF	24	(United Kingdom) John Bennett	Van Amersfoort Racing	7	Engine failure	15	
Fastest lap: (United Kingdom) Luke Browning (1:39.563 on lap 22)^{3}

Notes:

- ^1 Leonardo Fornaroli received a ten-second time penalty for leaving the track and gaining an advantage over Richard Verschoor. This dropped Fornaroli from 11th to 17th in the classification.
- ^2 Martinius Stenshorne retired from the race, but was classified as he completed over 90% of the race distance.
- ^3 Luke Browning set the fastest lap of the race, but did not finish within the top ten, so was ineligible to score the bonus point. Arvid Lindblad set the fastest lap within the top ten and therefore received the bonus point.

=== Feature race ===
The feature race was held on 7 December 2025 at 13:15 local time (UTC+4).

Pos.	No.	Driver	Entrant	Laps	Time/Retired	Grid	Points
1	20	(Paraguay) Joshua Dürksen	AIX Racing	33	1:01:24.429	8	25
2	2	(Czech Republic) Roman Staněk	Invicta Racing	33	+5.505	1	18+2
3	10	(Italy) Gabriele Minì	Prema Racing	33	+6.057	13	15
4	8	(Sweden) Dino Beganovic	Hitech TGR	33	+6.339^{1}	4	12
5	5	(Germany) Oliver Goethe	MP Motorsport	33	+12.349	6	10
6	25	(Mexico) Rafael Villagómez	Van Amersfoort Racing	33	+16.168	16	8
7	12	(India) Kush Maini	DAMS Lucas Oil	33	+16.898	20	6
8	15	(Japan) Ritomo Miyata	ART Grand Prix	33	+17.413	14	4
9	4	(United Kingdom) Arvid Lindblad	Campos Racing	33	+24.448	9	2
10	11	(United States) Jak Crawford	DAMS Lucas Oil	33	+25.789	2	1+1
11	1	(Italy) Leonardo Fornaroli	Invicta Racing	33	+26.625	3	
12	3	(Bulgaria) Nikola Tsolov	Campos Racing	33	+30.710	12	
13	6	(Netherlands) Richard Verschoor	MP Motorsport	33	+33.738	11	
14	7	(United Kingdom) Luke Browning	Hitech TGR	33	+37.380^{1}	17	
15	16	(Norway) Martinius Stenshorne	Rodin Motorsport	33	+38.432	18	
16	24	(United Kingdom) John Bennett	Van Amersfoort Racing	33	+42.986	15	
17	23	(Thailand) Tasanapol Inthraphuvasak	Trident	33	+52.498	22	
DNF	9	(Colombia) Sebastián Montoya	Prema Racing	8	Spun out	5	
DNF	17	(Republic of Ireland) Alex Dunne	Rodin Motorsport	1	Collision^{2}	10	
DNF	14	(France) Victor Martins	ART Grand Prix	1	Collision	7	
DNF	21	(United Kingdom) Cian Shields	AIX Racing	1	Collision	21	
DNS	22	(Netherlands) Laurens van Hoepen	Trident	0	Did not start	19	
Fastest lap: (United States) Jak Crawford (1:38.818 on lap 33)

Notes:

- ^1 Dino Beganovic and Luke Browning both received a five-second time penalty for speeding in the pit lane. This dropped Beganovic from 2nd to 4th in the classification, while Browning dropped from 13th to 14th.
- ^2 Alex Dunne was given a ten-second time penalty for causing a collision with Victor Martins. However, as Dunne was not classified and it was the final race of the season, the penalty could not be applied.

== Standings after the event ==
Drivers' Championship standings

Pos.	Driver	Points
1	(Italy) **Leonardo Fornaroli***	211
2	(United States) Jak Crawford	175
3	(Netherlands) Richard Verschoor	170
4	(United Kingdom) Luke Browning	162
5	(Republic of Ireland) Alex Dunne	150

Teams' Championship standings

Pos.	Team	Points
1	(United Kingdom) **Invicta Racing***	316
2	(United Kingdom) Hitech TGR	278
3	(Spain) Campos Racing	258
4	(France) DAMS Lucas Oil	207
5	(Netherlands) MP Motorsport	207

- Note: Only the top five positions are included for both sets of standings.
- Competitors marked in bold and with an asterisk are the 2025 Formula 2 Champions.

== See also ==
- 2025 Abu Dhabi Grand Prix

Previous round: 2025 Lusail Formula 2 round	FIA Formula 2 Championship; 2025 season	Next round: 2026 Melbourne Formula 2 round
Previous round: 2024 Yas Island Formula 2 round	Yas Island Formula 2 round	Next round: 2026 Yas Island Formula 2 round
