= 2024 Imola Formula 3 round =

Third round of the 2024 FIA Formula 3 season

(Italy) 2024 Imola Formula 3 round
Round details
- Round 3 of 10 in the 2024 FIA Formula 3 Championship.
- Layout of the Autodromo Internazionale Enzo e Dino Ferrari
- Location: Autodromo Internazionale Enzo e Dino Ferrari; Imola, Emilia-Romagna, Italy
- Course: Permanent racing facility 4.909 km (3.050 mi)

Sprint Race
- Date: 18 May 2024
- Laps: 18
Podium
First	(Germany) Oliver Goethe	Campos Racing
Second	(Germany) Tim Tramnitz	MP Motorsport
Third	(Mexico) Noel León	Van Amersfoort Racing
Fastest lap
Driver	(Germany) Oliver Goethe	Campos Racing
- Time: 1:33.596 (on lap 17)

Feature Race
- Date: 19 May 2024
- Laps: 22
Pole position
Driver	(Mexico) Santiago Ramos	Trident
Time	1:31.767	
Podium
First	(France) Sami Meguetounif	Trident
Second	(Germany) Oliver Goethe	Campos Racing
Third	(Italy) Leonardo Fornaroli	Trident
Fastest lap
Driver	(Germany) Oliver Goethe	Campos Racing
- Time: 1:33.817 (on lap 6)

The 2024 Imola FIA Formula 3 round was a motor racing event held between 17 and 19 May 2024 at the Autodromo Enzo e Dino Ferrari in Imola, Italy. It was the third round of the 2024 FIA Formula 3 Championship and was held in support of the 2024 Emilia Romagna Grand Prix.

== Classification ==
=== Summary ===
Trident achieved a 1-2-3 classification in qualifying at Imola Circuit, with Santiago Ramos on feature race pole position ahead of teammates Leonardo Fornaroli and Sami Meguetounif. Kacper Sztuka started the sprint race from first place, but was overtaken by Noel León at the first corner. León held the position ahead of Oliver Goethe and Tim Tramnitz through four safety car restarts. A virtual safety car was deployed on the penultimate lap after sixth-place Browning collided with Sztuka and retired in the gravel. Racing resumed on the final lap, and a faster reaction from Goethe allowed him to gain the lead from León and cross the finish line first. Goethe was initially penalised for a safety car procedure infringement, but the penalty was later reversed and his position reinstated.

Pole-sitter Ramos held the lead at the start of the feature race, but was overtaken by Fornaroli on lap three and would ultimately drop to eighth place by the end. Goethe, who started seventh, made his way up to second place and then gained the lead when Fornaroli slowed with a mechanical issue. This allowed Meguetounif into second place, who then caught and passed Goethe with four laps remaining. Meguetounif achieved his first win and podium in the category and was joined on the podium by Goethe and Fornaroli, who was able to recover positions and now led the Drivers' Championship by three points over Browning.

=== Qualifying ===
Qualifying was held on 17 May 2024, at 15:05 local time (UTC+2).

Pos.	No.	Driver	Entrant	Time/Gap	Grid SR	Grid FR
1	6	(Mexico) Santiago Ramos	Trident	1:31.767	12	1
2	4	(Italy) Leonardo Fornaroli	Trident	+0.053	11	2
3	5	(France) Sami Meguetounif	Trident	+0.252	10	3
4	3	(United Kingdom) Arvid Lindblad	Prema Racing	+0.342	9	4
5	1	(Sweden) Dino Beganovic	Prema Racing	+0.389	8	5
6	2	(Italy) Gabriele Minì	Prema Racing	+0.411	7	6
7	10	(Germany) Oliver Goethe	Campos Racing	+0.513	6	7
8	24	(Netherlands) Laurens van Hoepen	ART Grand Prix	+0.655	5	8
9	14	(United Kingdom) Luke Browning	Hitech Pulse-Eight	+0.662	4	9
10	7	(Germany) Tim Tramnitz	MP Motorsport	+0.732	3	10
11	20	(Mexico) Noel León	Van Amersfoort Racing	+0.746	2	11
12	8	(Poland) Kacper Sztuka	MP Motorsport	+0.748	1	12
13	27	(Italy) Nikita Bedrin (Note: Bedrin is a Russian driver competing under an Italian licence.)	AIX Racing	+0.910	13	13
14	25	(Bulgaria) Nikola Tsolov	ART Grand Prix	+0.942	17^{1}	14
15	23	(Australia) Christian Mansell	ART Grand Prix	+1.020	14	15
16	19	(Peru) Matías Zagazeta	Jenzer Motorsport	+1.071	15	16
17	15	(Norway) Martinius Stenshorne	Hitech Pulse-Eight	+1.102	16	17
18	17	(Austria) Charlie Wurz	Jenzer Motorsport	+1.184	18	18
19	29	(United Kingdom) Callum Voisin	Rodin Motorsport	+1.238	22^{1}	19
20	21	(Germany) Sophia Flörsch	Van Amersfoort Racing	+1.279	19	20
21	31	(United Kingdom) Joseph Loake	Rodin Motorsport	+1.302	20	21
22	18	(United States) Max Esterson	Jenzer Motorsport	+1.318	21	22
23	11	(Colombia) Sebastián Montoya	Campos Racing	+1.368	23	23
24	16	(United Kingdom) Cian Shields	Hitech Pulse-Eight	+1.368	24	24
25	22	(Australia) Tommy Smith	Van Amersfoort Racing	+1.369	25	25
26	30	(Poland) Piotr Wiśnicki	Rodin Motorsport	+1.450	26	26
27	12	(Spain) Mari Boya	Campos Racing	+1.470	27	27
28	28	(Austria) Joshua Dufek	AIX Racing	+1.669	28	28
29	26	(Thailand) Tasanapol Inthraphuvasak	AIX Racing	+1.784	29	29
107% time: 1:38.190 (+6.423)
DSQ	9	(Republic of Ireland) Alex Dunne	MP Motorsport	Disqualified^{2}	30	30

Notes:

- ^1 – Nikola Tsolov and Callum Voisin both received a three-place grid penalty after failing to respect minimum ECU times during red flag conditions in practice, breaching Article 31.9 of the FIA Sporting Regulations.
- ^2 – Alex Dunne originally qualified fifth, but was later disqualified from the results after it was found that his car had a non-conformity with the anti-roll bar links, a breach of Article 1.4 of the FIA Technical Regulations.

=== Sprint Race ===
The sprint race was held on 18 May 2024, at 10:05 local time (UTC+2).

Pos.	No.	Driver	Team	Laps	Time/Gap	Grid	Pts.
1	10	(Germany) Oliver Goethe	Campos Racing	18	34:19.754	6	10 (1)
2	7	(Germany) Tim Tramnitz	MP Motorsport	18	+2.158	3	9
3	20	(Mexico) Noel León	Van Amersfoort Racing	18	+2.975	2	8
4	1	(Sweden) Dino Beganovic	Prema Racing	18	+7.926	8	7
5	8	(Poland) Kacper Sztuka	MP Motorsport	18	+8.472	1	6
6	2	(Italy) Gabriele Minì	Prema Racing	18	+9.064	7	5
7	24	(Netherlands) Laurens van Hoepen	ART Grand Prix	18	+9.455	5	4
8	3	(United Kingdom) Arvid Lindblad	Prema Racing	18	+9.928	9	3
9	27	(Italy) Nikita Bedrin	AIX Racing	18	+10.489	13	2
10	6	(Mexico) Santiago Ramos	Trident	18	+10.847	12	1
11	4	(Italy) Leonardo Fornaroli	Trident	18	+11.336	11	
12	23	(Australia) Christian Mansell	ART Grand Prix	18	+12.012	14	
13	25	(Bulgaria) Nikola Tsolov	ART Grand Prix	18	+12.610	17	
14	9	(Republic of Ireland) Alex Dunne	MP Motorsport	18	+13.639	30	
15	21	(Germany) Sophia Flörsch	Van Amersfoort Racing	18	+14.118	19	
16	28	(Austria) Joshua Dufek	AIX Racing	18	+15.160	28	
17	19	(Peru) Matías Zagazeta	Jenzer Motorsport	18	+18.278	15	
18	18	(United States) Max Esterson	Jenzer Motorsport	18	+18.523	21	
19	16	(United Kingdom) Cian Shields	Hitech Pulse-Eight	18	+18.885	24	
20	30	(Poland) Piotr Wiśnicki	Rodin Motorsport	18	+19.201	26	
21	31	(United Kingdom) Joseph Loake	Rodin Motorsport	18	+19.700	20	
22	15	(Norway) Martinius Stenshorne	Hitech Pulse-Eight	18	+20.340	16	
23	17	(Austria) Charlie Wurz	Jenzer Motorsport	18	+24.683	18	
24	22	(Australia) Tommy Smith	Van Amersfoort Racing	18	+30.520	25	
25	11	(Colombia) Sebastián Montoya	Campos Racing	18	+33.475	23	
26^{1}	14	(United Kingdom) Luke Browning	Hitech Pulse-Eight	16	+2 laps	4	
DNF	26	(Thailand) Tasanapol Inthraphuvasak	AIX Racing	13	Driveshaft	29	
DNF	5	(France) Sami Meguetounif	Trident	7	Collision/Spun off	10	
DNF	29	(United Kingdom) Callum Voisin	Rodin Motorsport	4	Accident	22	
DNF	12	(Spain) Mari Boya	Campos Racing	0	Collision	27	
Fastest lap set by (Germany) Oliver Goethe: 1:33.596 (lap 17)

Notes:

- ^1 – Luke Browning retired from the race, but was classified as he completed over 90% of the race distance.

=== Feature Race ===
The sprint race was held on 19 May 2024, at 08:35 local time (UTC+2).

Pos.	No.	Driver	Team	Laps	Time/Gap	Grid	Pts.
1	5	(France) Sami Meguetounif	Trident	22	35:12.897	3	25
2	10	(Germany) Oliver Goethe	Campos Racing	22	+2.791	7	18 (1)
3	4	(Italy) Leonardo Fornaroli	Trident	22	+3.368	2	15
4	14	(United Kingdom) Luke Browning	Hitech Pulse-Eight	22	+3.686	9	12
5	1	(Sweden) Dino Beganovic	Prema Racing	22	+5.724	5	10
6	2	(Italy) Gabriele Minì	Prema Racing	22	+6.972	6	8
7	3	(United Kingdom) Arvid Lindblad	Prema Racing	22	+11.575	4	6
8	6	(Mexico) Santiago Ramos	Trident	22	+12.736	1	4 (2)
9	12	(Spain) Mari Boya	Campos Racing	22	+13.098	27	2
10	11	(Colombia) Sebastián Montoya	Campos Racing	22	+14.769	23	1
11	7	(Germany) Tim Tramnitz	MP Motorsport	22	+18.634	10	
12	21	(Germany) Sophia Flörsch	Van Amersfoort Racing	22	+21.658	20	
13	24	(Netherlands) Laurens van Hoepen	ART Grand Prix	22	+22.654	8	
14	15	(Norway) Martinius Stenshorne	Hitech Pulse-Eight	22	+23.516	17	
15	8	(Poland) Kacper Sztuka	MP Motorsport	22	+23.554	12	
16	9	(Republic of Ireland) Alex Dunne	MP Motorsport	22	+24.295	30	
17	19	(Peru) Matías Zagazeta	Jenzer Motorsport	22	+25.720	16	
18	16	(United Kingdom) Cian Shields	Hitech Pulse-Eight	22	+29.529	24	
19	20	(Mexico) Noel León	Van Amersfoort Racing	22	+30.045	11	
20	23	(Australia) Christian Mansell	ART Grand Prix	22	+31.500	15	
21	18	(United States) Max Esterson	Jenzer Motorsport	22	+32.271	22	
22	28	(Austria) Joshua Dufek	AIX Racing	22	+35.023	28	
23	30	(Poland) Piotr Wiśnicki	Rodin Motorsport	22	+37.573	26	
24	17	(Austria) Charlie Wurz	Jenzer Motorsport	22	+40.316	18	
25	31	(United Kingdom) Joseph Loake	Rodin Motorsport	22	+40.585	21	
26	25	(Bulgaria) Nikola Tsolov	ART Grand Prix	22	+42.360	14	
27	22	(Australia) Tommy Smith	Van Amersfoort Racing	22	+59.188	25	
28	26	(Thailand) Tasanapol Inthraphuvasak	AIX Racing	22	+1:11.428^{1}	29	
29	29	(United Kingdom) Callum Voisin	Rodin Motorsport	22	+1:26.623^{2}	19	
30	27	(Italy) Nikita Bedrin	AIX Racing	21	+1 lap	13	
Fastest lap set by (Germany) Oliver Goethe: 1:33.817 (lap 6)

Notes:

- ^1 – Tasanapol Inthraphuvasak originally finished 27th, but was later given a drive-through penalty post-race, which was converted into a 20-second time penalty after he was found to have stopped his car and restarted his car's engine after receiving a push from the track marshals, a breach of Article 22.4 of the Formula 3 Sporting Regulations.
- ^2 – Callum Voisin received a ten-second time-penalty for causing a collision with Nikita Bedrin. However, his final position was not affected by the penalty.

== Standings after the event ==
Drivers' Championship standings

	Pos.	Driver	Points
1	1	(Italy) Leonardo Fornaroli	52
1	2	(United Kingdom) Luke Browning	49
1	3	(Sweden) Dino Beganovic	45
1	4	(Italy) Gabriele Minì	45
6	5	(Germany) Oliver Goethe	41

Teams' Championship standings

	Pos.	Team	Points
	1	(Italy) Prema Racing	122
	2	(Italy) Trident	107
2	3	(Spain) Campos Racing	72
1	4	(United Kingdom) Hitech Pulse-Eight	59
1	5	(France) ART Grand Prix	49

- Note: Only the top five positions are included for both sets of standings.

== See also ==
- 2024 Emilia Romagna Grand Prix
- 2024 Imola Formula 2 round

== Notes ==
Previous round: 2024 Melbourne Formula 3 round	FIA Formula 3 Championship; 2024 season	Next round: 2024 Monte Carlo Formula 3 round
Previous round: 2022 Imola Formula 3 round (2023 Imola Formula 3 round cancelled)	Imola Formula 3 round	Next round: 2025 Imola Formula 3 round
