= 2024 Melbourne Formula 3 round =

Second round of the 2024 FIA Formula 3 season

(Australia) 2024 Melbourne Formula 3 round
Round details
- Round 2 of 10 in the 2024 FIA Formula 3 Championship.
- Layout of the Albert Park Circuit
- Location: Albert Park Circuit; Melbourne, Victoria, Australia
- Course: Temporary street circuit 5.278 km (3.280 mi)

Sprint Race
- Date: 23 March 2024
- Laps: 20
Podium
| First | (Norway) Martinius Stenshorne | Hitech Pulse-Eight |
| Second | (United Kingdom) Arvid Lindblad | Prema Racing |
| Third | (Netherlands) Laurens van Hoepen | ART Grand Prix |
Fastest lap
| Driver | (United Kingdom) Luke Browning | Hitech Pulse-Eight |
- Time: 1:36.186 (on lap 2)

Feature Race
- Date: 24 March 2024
- Laps: 23
Pole position
| Driver | (Italy) Leonardo Fornaroli | Trident |
| Time | 1:33.044 | |
Podium
| First | (Sweden) Dino Beganovic | Prema Racing |
| Second | (Italy) Leonardo Fornaroli | Trident |
| Third | (Italy) Gabriele Minì | Prema Racing |
Fastest lap
| Driver | (Sweden) Dino Beganovic | Prema Racing |
- Time: 1:35.588 (on lap 7)

The 2024 Melbourne FIA Formula 3 round was a motor racing event held from 21 to 24 March 2024 at the Albert Park Circuit in Melbourne, Australia. It was the second round of the 2024 FIA Formula 3 Championship and was held in support of the 2024 Australian Grand Prix.

== Classification ==
=== Summary ===
Leonardo Fornaroli qualified in first place at Albert Park Circuit ahead of Gabriele Minì and Dino Beganovic. Laurens van Hoepen started the sprint race from the front, and he and Martinius Stenshorne exchanged the lead multiple times in the early laps. Stenshorne ultimately held the position and then kept Arvid Lindblad behind, who had progressed to second place from fifth at the start. Stenshorne's victory was his first FIA Formula 3 podium finish.

Feature race pole-sitter Fornaroli led at the start and through the first restart after the safety car was deployed to recover Tommy Smith and Joseph Loake's collided cars. Beganovic overtook Fornaroli for the lead on lap 14. Minì had lost third place to Luke Browning but recovered the podium place on the penultimate lap. Beganovic's victory was his first in the category, and promoted him to fourth place in the Drivers' Championship. At the end of the round, Browning and Fornaroli were tied on points at the top of the championship – with Browning ahead by virtue of having won a race – both five points ahead of Minì.

=== Qualifying ===
Qualifying was held on 22 March 2024, at 14:00 local time (UTC+11).

| Pos. | No. | Driver | Entrant | Time/Gap | Grid SR | Grid FR |
|---|---|---|---|---|---|---|
| 1 | 4 | (Italy) Leonardo Fornaroli | Trident | 1:33.044 | 12 | 1 |
| 2 | 2 | (Italy) Gabriele Minì | Prema Racing | +0.019 | 11 | 2 |
| 3 | 1 | (Sweden) Dino Beganovic | Prema Racing | +0.300 | 10 | 3 |
| 4 | 27 | (Italy) Nikita Bedrin (Note: Bedrin is a Russian driver competing under an Italian licence.) | PHM AIX Racing | +0.345 | 8 | 4 |
| 5 | 14 | (United Kingdom) Luke Browning | Hitech Pulse-Eight | +0.391 | 7 | 5 |
| 6 | 12 | (Spain) Mari Boya | Campos Racing | +0.527 | 6 | 6 |
| 7 | 25 | (Bulgaria) Nikola Tsolov | ART Grand Prix | +0.540 | 9^{1} | 7 |
| 8 | 3 | (United Kingdom) Arvid Lindblad | Prema Racing | +0.672 | 5 | 8 |
| 9 | 10 | (Germany) Oliver Goethe | Campos Racing | +0.723 | 4 | 9 |
| 10 | 23 | (Australia) Christian Mansell | ART Grand Prix | +0.925 | 3 | 10 |
| 11 | 15 | (Norway) Martinius Stenshorne | Hitech Pulse-Eight | +1.051 | 2 | 11 |
| 12 | 24 | (Netherlands) Laurens van Hoepen | ART Grand Prix | +1.064 | 1 | 12 |
| 13 | 28 | (Austria) Joshua Dufek | PHM AIX Racing | +1.243 | 13 | 13 |
| 14 | 17 | (Austria) Charlie Wurz | Jenzer Motorsport | +1.268 | 14 | 14 |
| 15 | 11 | (Colombia) Sebastián Montoya | Campos Racing | +1.279 | 15 | 15 |
| 16 | 20 | (Mexico) Noel León | Van Amersfoort Racing | +1.314 | 16 | 16 |
| 17 | 9 | (Republic of Ireland) Alex Dunne | MP Motorsport | +1.377 | 17 | 17 |
| 18 | 6 | (Mexico) Santiago Ramos | Trident | +1.420 | 18 | 18 |
| 19 | 8 | (Poland) Kacper Sztuka | MP Motorsport | +1.441 | 19 | 19 |
| 20 | 18 | (United States) Max Esterson | Jenzer Motorsport | +1.443 | 20 | 20 |
| 21 | 19 | (Peru) Matías Zagazeta | Jenzer Motorsport | +1.473 | 21 | 21 |
| 22 | 7 | (Germany) Tim Tramnitz | MP Motorsport | +1.483 | 22 | 22 |
| 23 | 29 | (United Kingdom) Callum Voisin | Rodin Motorsport | +1.729 | 23 | 23 |
| 24 | 26 | (Thailand) Tasanapol Inthraphuvasak | PHM AIX Racing | +1.821 | 24 | 24 |
| 25 | 21 | (Germany) Sophia Flörsch | Van Amersfoort Racing | +1.858 | 25 | 25 |
| 26 | 5 | (France) Sami Meguetounif | Trident | +2.018 | 26 | 26 |
| 27 | 30 | (Poland) Piotr Wiśnicki | Rodin Motorsport | +2.369 | 27 | 27 |
| 28 | 16 | (United Kingdom) Cian Shields | Hitech Pulse-Eight | +2.475 | 28 | 28 |
| 29 | 31 | (United Kingdom) Joseph Loake | Rodin Motorsport | +2.656 | 29 | 29 |
| 30 | 22 | (Australia) Tommy Smith | Van Amersfoort Racing | +3.755 | 30 | 30 |
107% time: 1:39.557 (+6.513)

Notes

- ^1 – Nikola Tsolov received a three-place grid penalty for causing a collision with Alex Dunne during the weekend's free practice session.

=== Sprint race ===
The sprint race was held on 23 March 2024, at 11:15 local time (UTC+11).

| Pos. | No. | Driver | Team | Laps | Time/Gap | Grid | Pts. |
|---|---|---|---|---|---|---|---|
| 1 | 15 | (Norway) Martinius Stenshorne | Hitech Pulse-Eight | 20 | 35:32.870 | 2 | 10 |
| 2 | 3 | (United Kingdom) Arvid Lindblad | Prema Racing | 20 | +1.673 | 5 | 9 |
| 3 | 24 | (Netherlands) Laurens van Hoepen | ART Grand Prix | 20 | +1.958 | 1 | 8 |
| 4 | 12 | (Spain) Mari Boya | Campos Racing | 20 | +3.165 | 6 | 7 |
| 5 | 10 | (Germany) Oliver Goethe | Campos Racing | 20 | +4.152 | 4 | 6 |
| 6 | 2 | (Italy) Gabriele Minì | Prema Racing | 20 | +5.158 | 11 | 5 |
| 7 | 9 | (Republic of Ireland) Alex Dunne | MP Motorsport | 20 | +6.485 | 17 | 4 |
| 8 | 11 | (Colombia) Sebastián Montoya | Campos Racing | 20 | +7.122 | 15 | 3 |
| 9 | 4 | (Italy) Leonardo Fornaroli | Trident | 20 | +7.311 | 12 | 2 |
| 10 | 23 | (Australia) Christian Mansell | ART Grand Prix | 20 | +7.747 | 3 | 1 |
| 11 | 17 | (Austria) Charlie Wurz | Jenzer Motorsport | 20 | +8.234 | 14 | |
| 12 | 7 | (Germany) Tim Tramnitz | MP Motorsport | 20 | +8.628 | 22 | |
| 13 | 1 | (Sweden) Dino Beganovic | Prema Racing | 20 | +9.735^{1} | 10 | |
| 14 | 31 | (United Kingdom) Joseph Loake | Rodin Motorsport | 20 | +10.834 | 29 | |
| 15 | 19 | (Peru) Matías Zagazeta | Jenzer Motorsport | 20 | +11.288 | 21 | |
| 16 | 8 | (Poland) Kacper Sztuka | MP Motorsport | 20 | +11.967 | 19 | |
| 17 | 5 | (France) Sami Meguetounif | Trident | 20 | +13.233 | 26 | |
| 18 | 29 | (United Kingdom) Callum Voisin | Rodin Motorsport | 20 | +13.744 | 23 | |
| 19 | 21 | (Germany) Sophia Flörsch | Van Amersfoort Racing | 20 | +14.623 | 25 | |
| 20 | 25 | (Bulgaria) Nikola Tsolov | ART Grand Prix | 20 | +15.214 | 9 | |
| 21 | 27 | (Italy) Nikita Bedrin | PHM AIX Racing | 20 | +15.474^{2} | 8 | |
| 22 | 28 | (Austria) Joshua Dufek | PHM AIX Racing | 20 | +15.640 | 13 | |
| 23 | 30 | (Poland) Piotr Wiśnicki | Rodin Motorsport | 20 | +16.893 | 27 | |
| 24 | 6 | (Mexico) Santiago Ramos | Trident | 20 | +17.443 | 18 | |
| 25 | 16 | (United Kingdom) Cian Shields | Hitech Pulse-Eight | 20 | +18.250 | 28 | |
| 26 | 18 | (United States) Max Esterson | Jenzer Motorsport | 20 | +19.095^{3} | 20 | |
| 27 | 22 | (Australia) Tommy Smith | Van Amersfoort Racing | 20 | +27.347^{4} | 30 | |
| 28 | 14 | (United Kingdom) Luke Browning | Hitech Pulse-Eight | 19 | +1 lap | 7 | |
| DNF | 26 | (Thailand) Tasanapol Inthraphuvasak | PHM AIX Racing | 13 | Collision | 24 | |
| DNF | 20 | (Mexico) Noel León | Van Amersfoort Racing | 12 | Driveshaft | 16 | |
Fastest lap set by (United Kingdom) Luke Browning: 1:36.186 (lap 2)

Notes:

- ^1 – Dino Beganovic originally finished sixth, but was later given a five-second time penalty for forcing Sebastián Montoya off the track, subsequently dropping him down to thirteenth.
- ^2 – Nikita Bedrin originally finished eighth, but later received a ten-second time penalty for leaving the track and gaining an advantage, dropping him down to P21 in the final classification.
- ^3 – Max Esterson was given a five-second time penalty for exceeding track limits multiple times, dropping him down from P19 to P26.
- ^4 – Tommy Smith was given a ten-second time penalty for causing an avoidable collision with Tasanapol Inthraphuvasak, dropping him down from P25 to P27.

=== Feature race ===
The feature race was held on 24 March 2024, at 9:05 local time (UTC+11).

| Pos. | No. | Driver | Team | Laps | Time/Gap | Grid | Pts. |
|---|---|---|---|---|---|---|---|
| 1 | 1 | (Sweden) Dino Beganovic | Prema Racing | 23 | 41:23.816 | 2 | 25 (1) |
| 2 | 4 | (Italy) Leonardo Fornaroli | Trident | 23 | +1.682 | 1 | 18 (2) |
| 3 | 2 | (Italy) Gabriele Minì | Prema Racing | 23 | +3.221 | 3 | 15 |
| 4 | 14 | (United Kingdom) Luke Browning | Hitech Pulse-Eight | 23 | +4.050 | 5 | 12 |
| 5 | 17 | (Austria) Charlie Wurz | Jenzer Motorsport | 23 | +16.958 | 14 | 10 |
| 6 | 11 | (Colombia) Sebastián Montoya | Campos Racing | 23 | +21.230 | 15 | 8 |
| 7 | 12 | (Spain) Mari Boya | Campos Racing | 23 | +21.492 | 6 | 6 |
| 8 | 27 | (Italy) Nikita Bedrin | PHM AIX Racing | 23 | +25.610 | 4 | 4 |
| 9 | 10 | (Germany) Oliver Goethe | Campos Racing | 23 | +26.530 | 9 | 2 |
| 10 | 23 | (Australia) Christian Mansell | ART Grand Prix | 23 | +26.785 | 10 | 1 |
| 11 | 3 | (United Kingdom) Arvid Lindblad | Prema Racing | 23 | +27.009 | 8 | |
| 12 | 5 | (France) Sami Meguetounif | Trident | 23 | +29.437 | 26 | |
| 13 | 24 | (Netherlands) Laurens van Hoepen | ART Grand Prix | 23 | +29.512 | 12 | |
| 14 | 18 | (United States) Max Esterson | Jenzer Motorsport | 23 | +30.441 | 20 | |
| 15 | 7 | (Germany) Tim Tramnitz | MP Motorsport | 23 | +33.023 | 22 | |
| 16 | 9 | (Republic of Ireland) Alex Dunne | MP Motorsport | 23 | +33.577 | 17 | |
| 17 | 19 | (Peru) Matías Zagazeta | Jenzer Motorsport | 23 | +34.067 | 21 | |
| 18 | 8 | (Poland) Kacper Sztuka | MP Motorsport | 23 | +37.812 | 19 | |
| 19 | 25 | (Bulgaria) Nikola Tsolov | ART Grand Prix | 23 | +38.222 | 7 | |
| 20 | 16 | (United Kingdom) Cian Shields | Hitech Pulse-Eight | 23 | +42.693 | 28 | |
| 21 | 29 | (United Kingdom) Callum Voisin | Rodin Motorsport | 23 | +44.080 | 23 | |
| 22 | 28 | (Austria) Joshua Dufek | PHM AIX Racing | 23 | +52.748 | 13 | |
| 23 | 30 | (Poland) Piotr Wiśnicki | Rodin Motorsport | 23 | +1:01.595 | 27 | |
| 24 | 6 | (Mexico) Santiago Ramos | Trident | 23 | +1:09.926 | 18 | |
| 25 | 20 | (Mexico) Noel León | Van Amersfoort Racing | 23 | +1:10.635 | 16 | |
| 26 | 15 | (Norway) Martinius Stenshorne | Hitech Pulse-Eight | 23 | +1:14.235 | 11 | |
| DNF | 21 | (Germany) Sophia Flörsch | Van Amersfoort Racing | 1 | Collision damage | 25 | |
| DNF | 22 | (Australia) Tommy Smith | Van Amersfoort Racing | 0 | Collision | 30 | |
| DNF | 31 | (United Kingdom) Joseph Loake | Rodin Motorsport | 0 | Collision | 29 | |
| DNF | 26 | (Thailand) Tasanapol Inthraphuvasak | PHM AIX Racing | 0 | Collision damage | 24 | |
Fastest lap set by (Sweden) Dino Beganovic: 1:35.588 (lap 7)

== Standings after the event ==
Drivers' Championship standings

| | Pos. | Driver | Points |
|---|---|---|---|
| | 1 | (United Kingdom) Luke Browning | 37 |
| 2 | 2 | (Italy) Leonardo Fornaroli | 37 |
| 4 | 3 | (Italy) Gabriele Minì | 32 |
| 11 | 4 | (Sweden) Dino Beganovic | 28 |
| | 5 | (United Kingdom) Arvid Lindblad | 23 |

Teams' Championship standings

| | Pos. | Team | Points |
|---|---|---|---|
| 2 | 1 | (Italy) Prema Racing | 83 |
| 1 | 2 | (Italy) Trident | 60 |
| 1 | 3 | (United Kingdom) Hitech Pulse-Eight | 47 |
| 2 | 4 | (France) ART Grand Prix | 46 |
| 1 | 5 | (Spain) Campos Racing | 39 |

- Note: Only the top five positions are included for both sets of standings.

== See also ==
- 2024 Australian Grand Prix
- 2024 Melbourne Formula 2 round

== Notes ==
| Previous round: 2024 Sakhir Formula 3 round | FIA Formula 3 Championship; 2024 season | Next round: 2024 Imola Formula 3 round |
| Previous round: 2023 Melbourne Formula 3 round | Melbourne Formula 3 round | Next round: 2025 Melbourne Formula 3 round |
