= Piotr Wiśnicki =

Polish racing driver (born 2003)

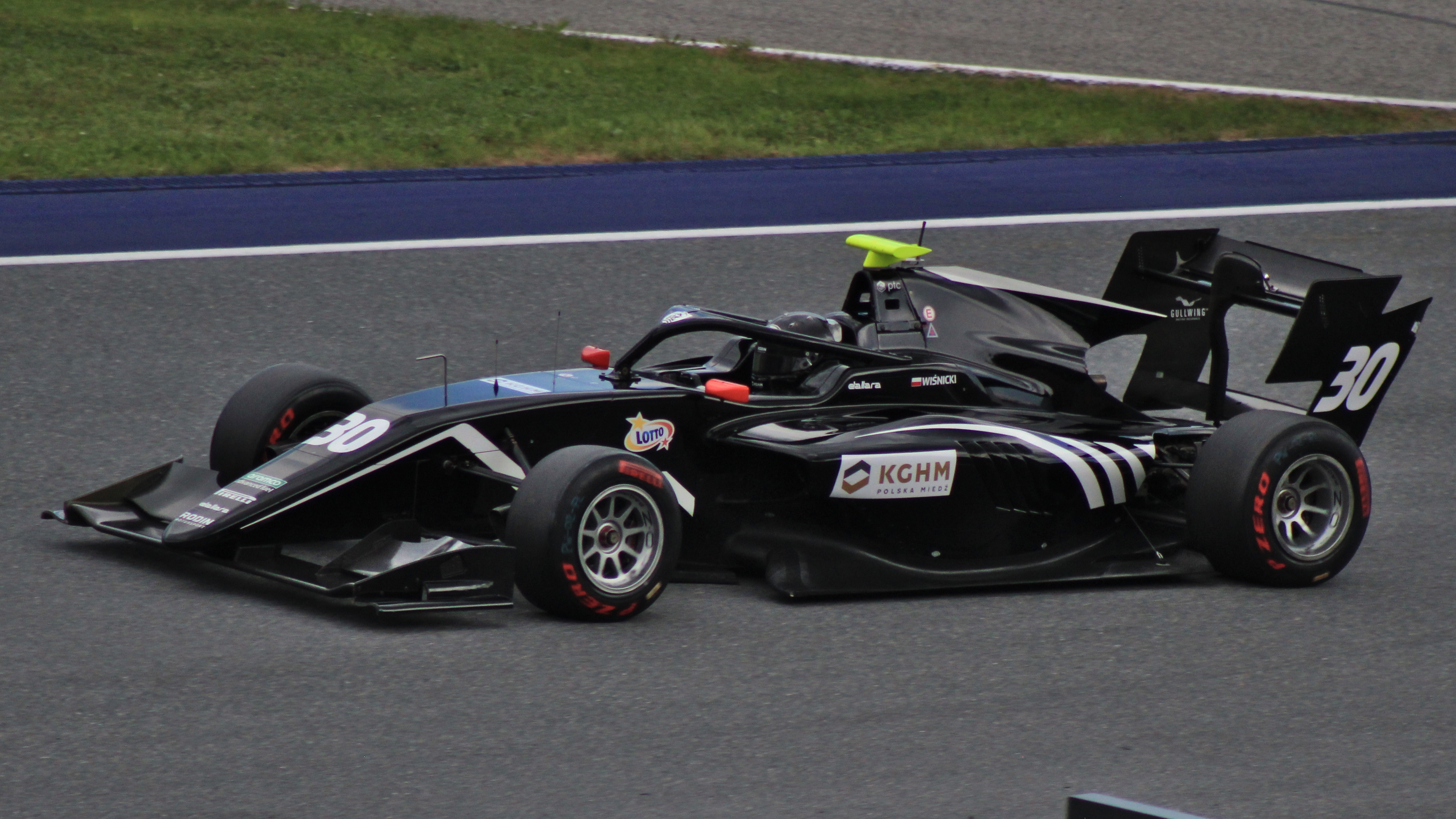
- Wiśnicki driving the Dallara F3 2019 during the 2024 Spielberg Formula 3 round
- Nationality: (Poland) Polish
- Born: 20 August 2003 (age 23) Warsaw, Poland

FIA Formula 3 Championship career
- Debut season: 2023
- Current team: Rodin Motorsport
- Car number: 30
- Former teams: PHM Racing by Charouz
- Starts: 28
- Wins: 0
- Podiums: 0
- Poles: 0
- Fastest laps: 1
- Best finish: 23rd in 2024

Previous series
- 2022 2020–21: FR European Championship; Italian F4 Championship

Piotr "Piotrek" Wiśnicki (Polish pronunciation: [pjɔtr viɕˈnit͡s.ki]; born 20 August 2003) is a Polish racing driver who most recently competed in the 2024 FIA Formula 3 Championship for Rodin Motorsport, having previously competed in the series in 2023 for PHM Racing by Charouz. He has previously competed in Italian F4 and the Formula Regional European Championship.

== Career ==
=== Karting career ===
Wiśnicki started professional karting racing in 2014, at eleven years old. During that time, he came in second in the Rotax Max Challenge Central-Eastern Europe in the Mini Max category. He came in 21st during the 2016 CIK-FIA Karting Academy Trophy. Wiśnicki competed in more Rotax Max Challenges from 2015 to 2019 but did not win any titles.

=== Formula 4 ===
==== 2020 ====
Wiśnicki made his single-seater debut during the 2020 Italian F4 Championship with Jenzer Motorsport. Wiśnicki was unable to score points throughout most of his campaign, until the round at Monza where he finished ninth on the road during the first race, before being promoted to eighth as Gabriele Minì was penalised. Wiśnicki added another points finish with sixth place in the second race, but was ultimately unable to complete the season. He finished the championship in 19th with twelve points.

==== 2021 ====
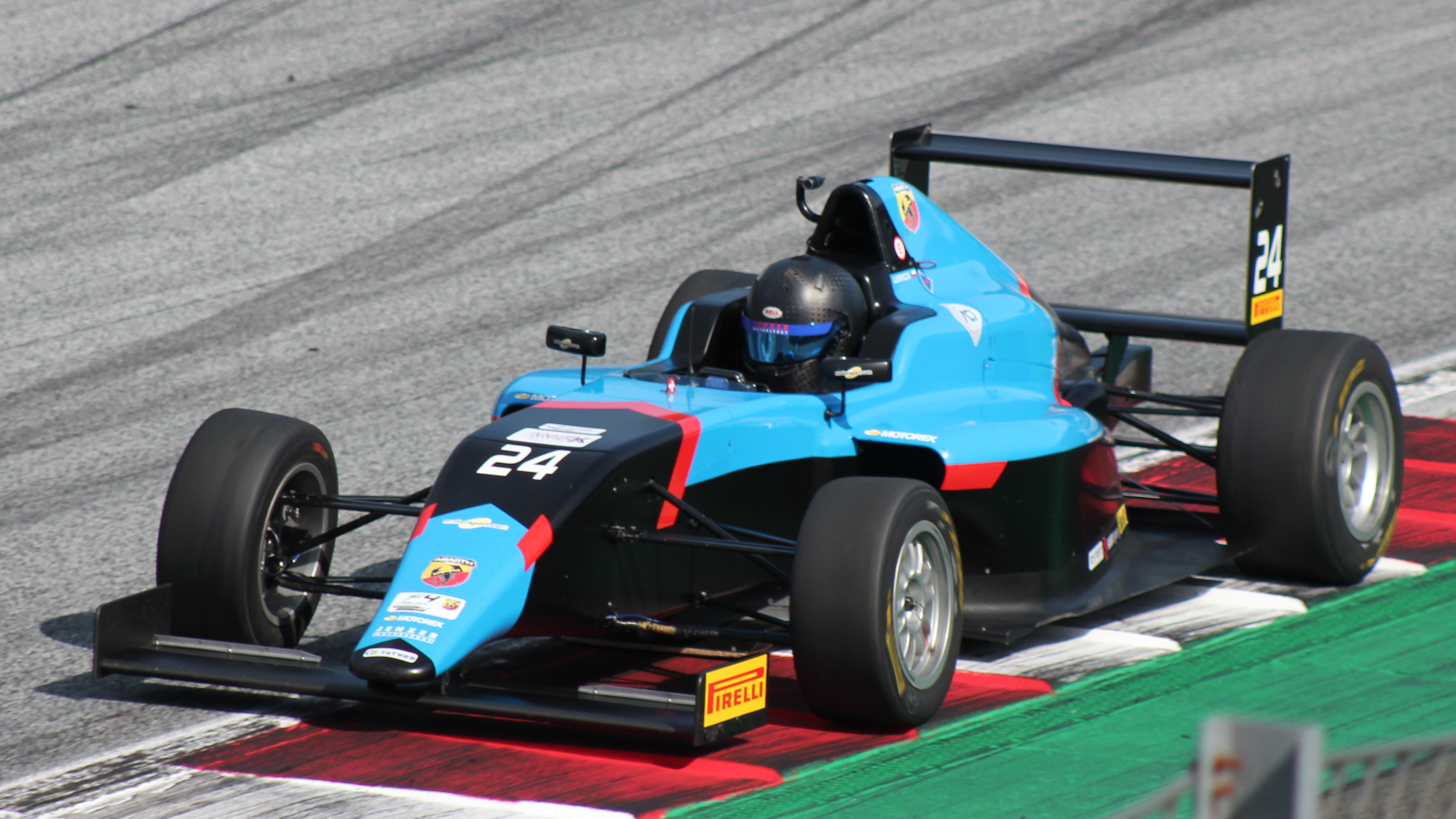
Wiśnicki racing in the 2021 Italian F4 Championship at the Red Bull Ring.

Wiśnicki remained with Jenzer Motorsport for the 2021 Italian F4 Championship. His first point came at the second race in Vallelunga, before adding three more points finishes which including a high of seventh. Wiśnicki ended the campaign 23rd in the championship, scoring fifteen points.

=== Formula Regional ===
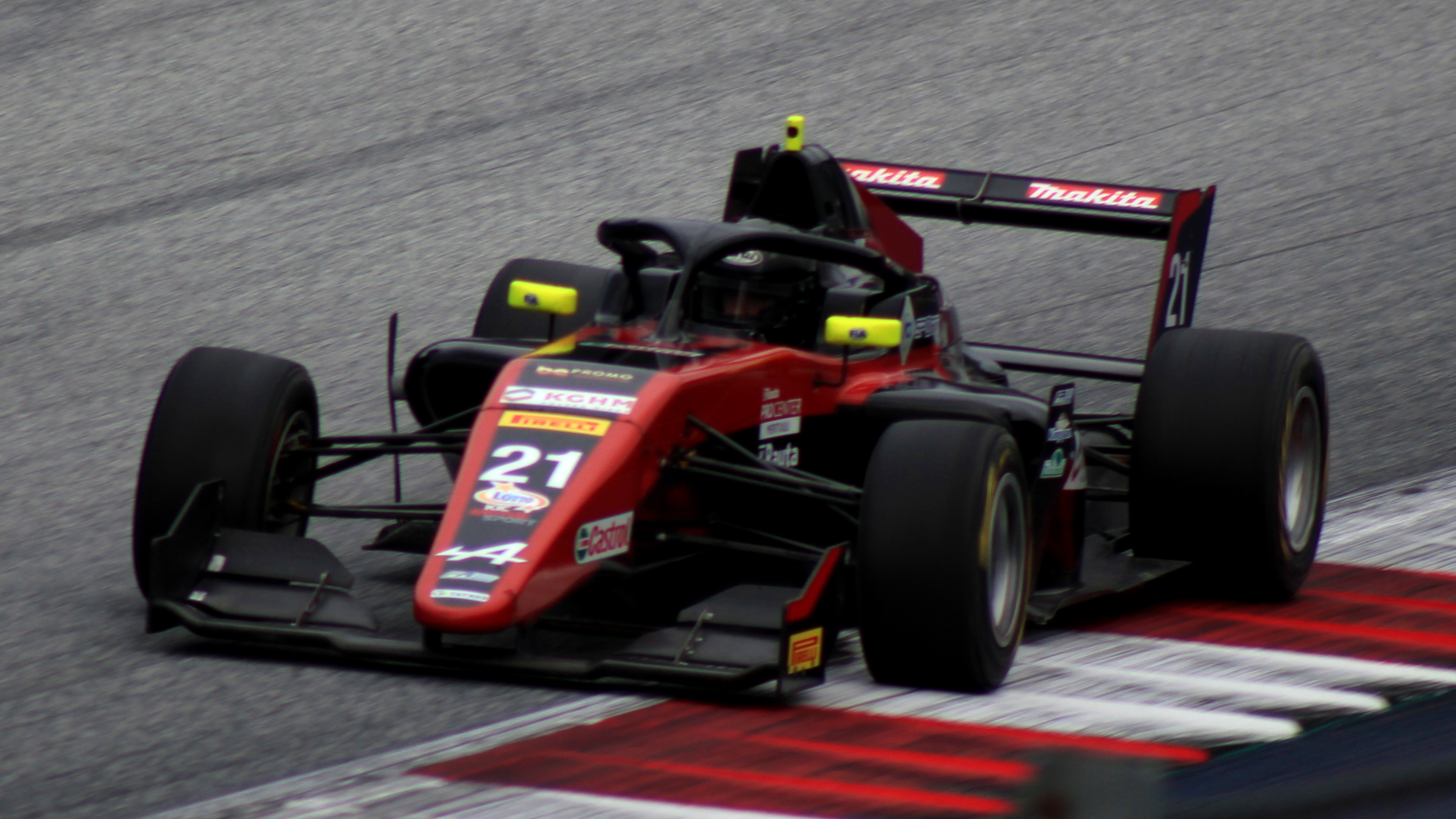
Wiśnicki racing in the 2022 Formula Regional European Championship at the Red Bull Ring.

For 2022, Wiśnicki made the step up to the 2022 Formula Regional European Championship with KIC Motorsport, partnering Francesco Braschi and Santiago Ramos. In his first weekend at Monza, he finished 24th and 21st, the latter result his best finish in the championship. For the second round in Imola, Patrik Pasma stood in for Wiśnicki as he was to attend his school commitments. However, he returned to the next round in Monaco. Wiśnicki failed to score any points throughout the season and ended 35th in the standings.

=== FIA Formula 3 Championship ===
==== 2023 ====
For 2023, Wiśnicki was announced to be moving up to the FIA Formula 3 Championship with PHM Racing by Charouz, partnering Sophia Flörsch and Roberto Faria. During the first four rounds, Wiśnicki achieved a best finish of 18th place at Melbourne. However, he would be replaced by GB3 racer McKenzy Cresswell starting from the and Spielberg. In a Facebook post on 1 July, Wiśnicki stated he decided to "suspend" his involvement with PHM Racing, citing negligence by the team, such as lack of cooperation with the drivers regarding car setups and the firing of an engineer who was "the only one knowing how to and willing to work". By the end of the season, Wiśnicki was ranked 34th in the overall standings.

==== 2024 ====
In January 2024, it was announced that Wiśnicki would be returning to FIA Formula 3 for the 2024 season, partnering Callum Voisin and Joseph Loake at the newly rebranded Rodin Motorsport team. It would prove to be a difficult year for Wiśnicki, being notably outpaced by teammates Joseph Loake and Callum Voisin and frequently languishing at the back of the grid. However, his big break came during a damp Silverstone feature race, where a bold decision to stay out on dry tyres proved right, as he vaulted up the leaderboard in the closing laps to finish in fifth place – his only points finish of the season. His result eventually placed him 23rd in the standings with ten points, ahead of Loake but considerably behind teammate Voisin.

== Karting record ==
=== Karting career summary ===
Season	Series	Team	Position
2011	Rotax Max Challenge Poland – Micro Max		9th
2012	Rotax Max Challenge Poland – Micro Max	Wyrzykowski Motorsport	2nd
2013	Rotax Max Challenge Poland – Mini MAX		7th
2014	Rotax Max Challenge Central-Eastern Europe – Mini Max		2nd
2014	Rotax Max Challenge Poland – Mini MAX	Wyrzykowski Motorsport	1st
2015	Rotax Max Challenge Grand Finals – Mini MAX		4th
2015	International Poland Championship – Rotax Max Junior	Wyrzykowski-Motorsport	5th
2015	Rotax Max Challenge Poland – Junior MAX	Wyrzykowski-Motorsport	3rd
2016	CIK-FIA Karting Academy Trophy		21st
2016	Rotax Max Wintercup – Rotax Max Junior	Wyrzykowski Motorsport	28th
2016	International Poland Championship – Rotax Max Junior	Wyrzykowski Motorsport	2nd
2016	Rotax Max Challenge Poland – Junior MAX	Wyrzykowski Motorsport	2nd
2017	Rotax Max Challenge Grand Finals – Junior	Wyrzykowski Motorsport	47th
2017	Rotax Max Wintercup – Rotax Max Junior		12th
2018	FIA Central European Zone – R DD2	Wyrzykowski Motorsport	7th
2018	Rotax Max Challenge Grand Finals – DD2	Wyrzykowski Motorsport	17th
2018	Rotax Max Challenge Euro Trophy – DD2		6th
2018	Gold Trophy - DD2 Max		2nd
2018	Rotax Max Challenge – DD2 Max		2nd
2019	Rotax Max Challenge Euro Trophy – DD2	Wyrzykowski Motorsport	13th

== Racing record ==
=== Racing career summary ===
Season	Series	Team	Races	Wins	Poles	F/Laps	Podiums	Points	Position
2020	Italian F4 Championship	Jenzer Motorsport	15	0	0	0	0	12	19th
2021	Italian F4 Championship	Jenzer Motorsport	21	0	0	0	0	15	23rd
2022	Formula Regional European Championship	KIC Motorsport	17	0	0	0	0	0	35th
2023	FIA Formula 3 Championship	PHM Racing by Charouz	8	0	0	0	0	0	34th
2024	FIA Formula 3 Championship	Rodin Motorsport	20	0	0	1	0	10	23rd

^{*} Season still in progress.

=== Complete Italian F4 Championship results ===
(key) (Races in bold indicate pole position) (Races in italics indicate fastest lap)

Year	Team	1	2	3	4	5	6	7	8	9	10	11	12	13	14	15	16	17	18	19	20	21	Pos	Points
2020	Jenzer Motorsport	MIS; 1 Ret	MIS; 2; 16	MIS; 3; 19	IMO1; 1; 19	IMO1; 2; 15	IMO1; 3; 17	RBR; 1 Ret	RBR; 2; 12	RBR; 3; 23†	MUG; 1; 20	MUG; 2; 16	MUG; 3; 19	MNZ; 1; 8	MNZ; 2; 6	MNZ; 3; 22†	IMO2; 1	IMO2; 2	IMO2; 3	VLL; 1	VLL; 2	VLL; 3	19th	12
2021	Jenzer Motorsport	LEC; 1; 27	LEC; 2; 11	LEC; 3; 21	MIS; 1; 22	MIS; 2; 18	MIS; 3; 16	VLL; 1; 17	VLL; 2; 10	VLL; 3; 17	IMO; 1; 8	IMO; 2; 20	IMO; 3; 11	RBR; 1; 12	RBR; 2; 16	RBR; 3; 23	MUG; 1; 12	MUG; 2; 14	MUG; 3; 7	MNZ; 1; 8	MNZ; 2; 30†	MNZ; 3; 22	23rd	15

=== Complete Formula Regional European Championship results ===
(key) (Races in bold indicate pole position) (Races in italics indicate fastest lap)

Year	Team	1	2	3	4	5	6	7	8	9	10	11	12	13	14	15	16	17	18	19	20	DC	Points
2022	KIC Motorsport	MNZ; 1; 24	MNZ; 2; 21	IMO; 1	IMO; 2	MCO; 1 DNQ	MCO; 2; 23	LEC; 1; 30	LEC; 2; 27	ZAN; 1; 29	ZAN; 2; 25	HUN; 1; 28	HUN; 2; 24	SPA; 1; 29	SPA; 2 Ret	RBR; 1; 28	RBR; 2; 23	CAT; 1; 28	CAT; 2; 25	MUG; 1; 27	MUG; 2 Ret	35th	0

^{*} Season still in progress.

=== Complete FIA Formula 3 Championship results ===
(key) (Races in bold indicate pole position) (Races in italics indicate fastest lap)

Year	Entrant	1	2	3	4	5	6	7	8	9	10	11	12	13	14	15	16	17	18	19	20	DC	Points
2023	PHM Racing by Charouz	BHR; SPR; 25	BHR; FEA; 24	MEL; SPR; 23	MEL; FEA; Ret	MON; SPR; 18	MON; FEA; 22	CAT; SPR; 24	CAT; FEA; 21	RBR; SPR	RBR; FEA	SIL; SPR	SIL; FEA	HUN; SPR	HUN; FEA	SPA; SPR	SPA; FEA	MNZ; SPR	MNZ; FEA			34th	0
2024	Rodin Motorsport	BHR; SPR; 25	BHR; FEA; 25	MEL; SPR; 23	MEL; FEA; 23	IMO; SPR; 20	IMO; FEA; 23	MON; SPR; 21	MON; FEA; 25	CAT; SPR; 24	CAT; FEA; 24	RBR; SPR; 23	RBR; FEA; 19	SIL; SPR; 14	SIL; FEA; 5	HUN; SPR; 24	HUN; FEA; 21	SPA; SPR; 21	SPA; FEA; 24	MNZ; SPR; Ret	MNZ; FEA; Ret	23rd	10

^{*} Season still in progress.
