= 2024 Budapest Formula 3 round =

Motor racing event

(Hungary) 2024 Hungaroring Formula 3 round
Round details
- Round 8 of 10 in the 2024 FIA Formula 3 Championship.
- Location: Hungaroring; Mogyoród, Hungary
- Course: Permanent racing facility 4.381 km (2.722 mi)

Sprint Race
- Date: 20 July 2024
- Laps: 18 (Note: The race was scheduled to be run for 19 laps, but an incident involving Joseph Loake caused a start abortion, which consequently led to an extra formation lap. Thus, the race distance has been shortened to 18 laps.)
Podium
First	(Italy) Nikita Bedrin	AIX Racing
Second	(Thailand) Tasanapol Inthraphuvasak	AIX Racing
Third	(Sweden) Dino Beganovic	Prema Racing
Fastest lap
Driver	(United Kingdom) Joseph Loake	Rodin Motorsport
- Time: 1:35.669 (on lap 16)

Feature Race
- Date: 21 July 2024
- Laps: 23 (Note: The race was scheduled to be run for 24 laps, but the first start attempt was aborted, which consequently led to an extra formation lap. Thus, the race distance has been shortened to 23 laps.)
Pole position
Driver	(Netherlands) Laurens van Hoepen	ART Grand Prix
Time	1:33.935	
Podium
First	(Bulgaria) Nikola Tsolov	ART Grand Prix
Second	(Mexico) Noel León	Van Amersfoort Racing
Third	(Italy) Leonardo Fornaroli	Trident
Fastest lap
Driver	(France) Sami Meguetounif	Trident
- Time: 1:35.293 (on lap 18)

The 2024 Budapest Formula 3 round was a motor racing event held between 19 and 21 July at the Hungaroring, Mogyoród, Hungary. It was the eighth round of the 2024 FIA Formula 3 Championship and was held in support of the 2024 Hungarian Grand Prix.

== Classification ==
=== Qualifying ===
Qualifying was held on 19 July 2024, at 15:05 local time (UTC+2).

Pos.	No.	Driver	Team	Time/Gap	Grid SR	Grid FR
1	24	(Netherlands) Laurens van Hoepen	ART Grand Prix	1:33.935	12	1
2	25	(Bulgaria) Nikola Tsolov	ART Grand Prix	+0.233	11	2
3	4	(Italy) Leonardo Fornaroli	Trident	+0.238	10	3
4	20	(Mexico) Noel León	Van Amersfoort Racing	+0.239	9	4
5	6	(Mexico) Santiago Ramos	Trident	+0.247	8	5
6	5	(France) Sami Meguetounif	Trident	+0.589	7	6
7	7	(Germany) Tim Tramnitz	MP Motorsport	+0.596	6	7
8	23	(Australia) Christian Mansell	ART Grand Prix	+0.647	5	8
9	29	(United Kingdom) Callum Voisin	Rodin Motorsport	+0.672	4	9
10	26	(Thailand) Tasanapol Inthraphuvasak	AIX Racing	+0.750	3	10
11	27	(Italy) Nikita Bedrin (Note: Bedrin is a Russian driver competing under an Italian licence.)	AIX Racing	+0.762	2	11
12	1	(Sweden) Dino Beganovic	Prema Racing	+0.870	1	12
13	2	(Italy) Gabriele Minì	Prema Racing	+0.937	13	13
14	10	(Germany) Oliver Goethe	Campos Racing	+1.003	14	14
15	14	(United Kingdom) Luke Browning	Hitech Pulse-Eight	+1.016^{1}	15	15
16	18	(United States) Max Esterson	Jenzer Motorsport	+1.107	16	16
17	31	(United Kingdom) Joseph Loake	Rodin Motorsport	+1.126	17	17
18	17	(Austria) Charlie Wurz	Jenzer Motorsport	+1.152	18	18
19	12	(Spain) Mari Boya	Campos Racing	+1.170	19	19
20	19	(Peru) Matías Zagazeta	Jenzer Motorsport	+1.175	20	20
21	3	(United Kingdom) Arvid Lindblad	Prema Racing	+1.290	21	21
22	15	(Norway) Martinius Stenshorne	Hitech Pulse-Eight	+1.451	22	22
23	30	(Poland) Piotr Wiśnicki	Rodin Motorsport	+1.453	23	23
24	16	(United Kingdom) Cian Shields	Hitech Pulse-Eight	+1.582	24	24
25	9	(Republic of Ireland) Alex Dunne	MP Motorsport	+1.723	25	25
26	8	(Poland) Kacper Sztuka	MP Motorsport	+1.815	26	26
27	21	(Germany) Sophia Flörsch	Van Amersfoort Racing	+1.916	27	27
28	22	(Australia) Tommy Smith	Van Amersfoort Racing	+2.558	28	28
107% time: 1:40:510 (+6.575)
—	11	(Colombia) Sebastián Montoya	Campos Racing	+16.220	29^{2}	29
DSQ	28	(Austria) Joshua Dufek	AIX Racing	Disqualified^{3}	30	30

Notes:

- ^1 – Luke Browning originally qualified in seventh place, but his best lap time was deleted after causing a red flag. With his laptime removed from the results, Browning drops from seventh in the original Qualifying order down to P15, moving each driver behind him up one position each.
- ^2 – Sebastián Montoya failed to set a time within the 107%-rule, but was later given permission by the stewards to start both races from the back of the grid.
- ^3 – Joshua Dufek originally qualified in sixth place, but was later disqualified from the results as it was found that his car had been below the minimum weight required, contravening Art. 5.1 of the FIA Formula 3 Championship Technical Regulations.

=== Sprint Race ===
The Sprint race was held on 20 July 2024, at 09:50 local time (UTC+2).

Pos.	No.	Driver	Team	Laps	Time/Gap	Grid	Pts.
1	27	(Italy) Nikita Bedrin	AIX Racing	18	29:41.355	2	10
2	26	(Thailand) Tasanapol Inthraphuvasak	AIX Racing	18	+1.560	3	9
3	1	(Sweden) Dino Beganovic	Prema Racing	18	+2.189	1	8
4	7	(Germany) Tim Tramnitz	MP Motorsport	18	+2.629	6	7
5	23	(Australia) Christian Mansell	ART Grand Prix	18	+3.483	5	6
6	29	(United Kingdom) Callum Voisin	Rodin Motorsport	18	+3.980	4	5
7	4	(Italy) Leonardo Fornaroli	Trident	18	+4.398	10	4
8	14	(United Kingdom) Luke Browning	Hitech Pulse-Eight	18	+4.909	15	3
9	24	(Netherlands) Laurens van Hoepen	ART Grand Prix	18	+5.488	12	2
10	5	(France) Sami Meguetounif	Trident	18	+5.814	7	1
11	10	(Germany) Oliver Goethe	Campos Racing	18	+6.511	14	
12	20	(Mexico) Noel León	Van Amersfoort Racing	18	+7.183	9	
13	15	(Norway) Martinius Stenshorne	Hitech Pulse-Eight	18	+8.174	22	
14	2	(Italy) Gabriele Mini	Prema Racing	18	+8.905	13	
15	3	(United Kingdom) Arvid Lindblad	Prema Racing	18	+9.367	21	
16	18	(United States) Max Esterson	Jenzer Motorsport	18	+11.259	16	
17	17	(Austria) Charlie Wurz	Jenzer Motorsport	18	+11.890	18	
18	12	(Spain) Mari Boya	Campos Racing	18	+12.434	19	
19	11	(Colombia) Sebastián Montoya	Campos Racing	18	+12.888	29	
20	9	(Republic of Ireland) Alex Dunne	MP Motorsport	18	+13.440	28^{1}	
21	16	(United Kingdom) Cian Shields	Hitech Pulse-Eight	18	+13.885	23	
22	28	(Austria) Joshua Dufek	AIX Racing	18	+17.716	30	
23	21	(Germany) Sophia Flörsch	Van Amersfoort Racing	18	+18.100	24	
24	30	(Poland) Piotr Wiśnicki	Rodin Motorsport	18	+19.032	25^{2}	
25	22	(Australia) Tommy Smith	Van Amersfoort Racing	18	+19.562	26	
26	31	(United Kingdom) Joseph Loake	Rodin Motorsport	18	+32.830	17	
27	8	(Poland) Kacper Sztuka	MP Motorsport	18	+59.688	27^{2}	
28	6	(Mexico) Santiago Ramos	Trident	18	+1:00.617	8	
29	25	(Bulgaria) Nikola Tsolov	ART Grand Prix	18	+1:10.224	11	
DNF	19	(Peru) Matías Zagazeta	Jenzer Motorsport	0	Collision damage	20	
Fastest lap set by (United Kingdom) Joseph Loake: 1:35.669 (lap 16)

Notes:

- ^1 – Alex Dunne was handed a ten-place grid-penalty after the Silverstone round for re-joining the track in an unsafe manner.
- ^2 – Piotr Wiśnicki and Kacper Sztuka both received a three-place grid penalty after qualifying for impeding Dino Beganovic and Sebastián Montoya. As a consequence, both started the Sprint race from P25 and P27 respectively.

=== Feature Race ===
The Feature race was held on 21 July 2024, at 08:25 local time (UTC+2).

Pos.	No.	Driver	Team	Laps	Time/Gap	Grid	Pts.
1	25	(Bulgaria) Nikola Tsolov	ART Grand Prix	23	38:54.231	2	25
2	20	(Mexico) Noel León	Van Amersfoort Racing	23	+1.114	4	18
3	4	(Italy) Leonardo Fornaroli	Trident	23	+1.439	3	15
4	23	(Australia) Christian Mansell	ART Grand Prix	23	+1.781	8	12 (1)
5	6	(Mexico) Santiago Ramos	Trident	23	+2.091	5	10
6	29	(United Kingdom) Callum Voisin	Rodin Motorsport	23	+2.497	9	8
7	27	(Italy) Nikita Bedrin	AIX Racing	23	+2.751	11	6
8	10	(Germany) Oliver Goethe	Campos Racing	23	+3.304	14	4
9	1	(Sweden) Dino Beganovic	Prema Racing	23	+4.008	12	2
10	12	(Spain) Mari Boya	Campos Racing	23	+4.443	19	1
11	2	(Italy) Gabriele Minì	Prema Racing	23	+5.040	13	
12	14	(United Kingdom) Luke Browning	Hitech Pulse-Eight	23	+5.139	15	
13	15	(Norway) Martinius Stenshorne	Hitech Pulse-Eight	23	+5.786	22	
14	26	(Thailand) Tasanapol Inthraphuvasak	AIX Racing	23	+6.785	10	
15	18	(United States) Max Esterson	Jenzer Motorsport	23	+7.190	16	
16	9	(Republic of Ireland) Alex Dunne	MP Motorsport	23	+7.748	18	
17	16	(United Kingdom) Cian Shields	Hitech Pulse-Eight	23	+8.206	24	
18	8	(Poland) Kacper Sztuka	MP Motorsport	23	+9.211	26	
19	11	(Colombia) Sebastián Montoya	Campos Racing	23	+9.453	29	
20	7	(Germany) Tim Tramnitz	MP Motorsport	23	+9.850	7	
21	30	(Poland) Piotr Wiśnicki	Rodin Motorsport	23	+10.377	23	
22	28	(Austria) Joshua Dufek	AIX Racing	23	+11.456	30	
23	21	(Germany) Sophia Flörsch	Van Amersfoort Racing	23	+11.792	27	
24	22	(Australia) Tommy Smith	Van Amersfoort Racing	23	+16.104	28	
25	5	(France) Sami Meguetounif	Trident	23	+38.783	6	
26	31	(United Kingdom) Joseph Loake	Rodin Motorsport	22	+1 lap	17	
27^{1}	19	(Peru) Matías Zagazeta	Jenzer Motorsport	20	Collision	20	
28^{1}	3	(United Kingdom) Arvid Lindblad	Prema Racing	20	Collision	21	
DNF	17	(Austria) Charlie Wurz	Jenzer Motorsport	1	Collision damage	18	
DSQ	24	(Netherlands) Laurens van Hoepen	ART Grand Prix	23	Disqualified^{2}	1	(2)
Fastest lap set by (France) Sami Meguetounif: 1:35.293 (lap 18)

Notes:

- ^1 – Matías Zagazeta and Arvid Lindblad collided with each other and retired, but they were classified as they completed over 90% of the race distance.
- ^2 – Laurens van Hoepen originally finished second, but was later disqualified as it was found that his car had not met the minimum weight requirement, a breach of Article 5.1 of the 2024 FIA Formula 3 Technical Regulations. Thus, all drivers behind him have been moved up one position each, with Leonardo Fornaroli taking over the final spot on the podium in third.

== Standings after the event ==
Drivers' Championship standings

	Pos.	Driver	Points
	1	(Italy) Gabriele Minì	119
1	2	(United Kingdom) Luke Browning	115
1	3	(United Kingdom) Arvid Lindblad	113
	4	(Italy) Leonardo Fornaroli	112
2	5	(Australia) Christian Mansell	97

Teams' Championship standings

Pos.	Team	Points
1	(Italy) Prema Racing	322
2	(France) ART Grand Prix	225
3	(Italy) Trident	183
4	(Spain) Campos Racing	146
5	(United Kingdom) Hitech Pulse-Eight	141

- Note: Only the top five positions are included for both sets of standings.

== See also ==
- 2024 Hungarian Grand Prix
- 2024 Budapest Formula 2 round

== Notes ==
Previous round: 2024 Silverstone Formula 3 round	FIA Formula 3 Championship; 2024 season	Next round: 2024 Spa-Francorchamps Formula 3 round
Previous round: 2023 Budapest Formula 3 round	Budapest Formula 3 round	Next round: 2025 Budapest Formula 3 round
