= 2024 FIA Formula 3 Championship =

Motor racing championship held in 2024

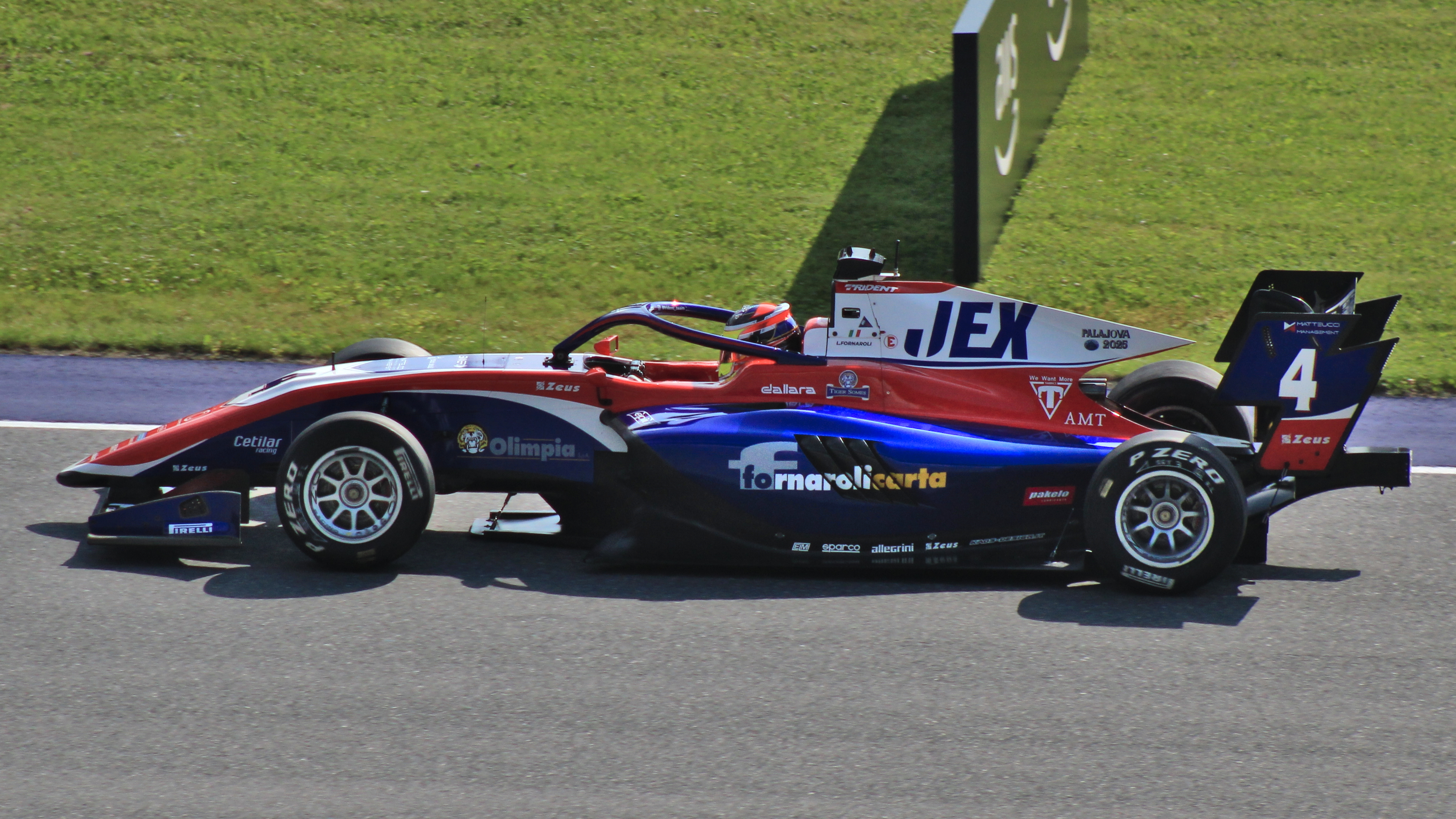
Leonardo Fornaroli became the 2024 FIA Formula 3 Champion, and was the first to do so without any race wins.

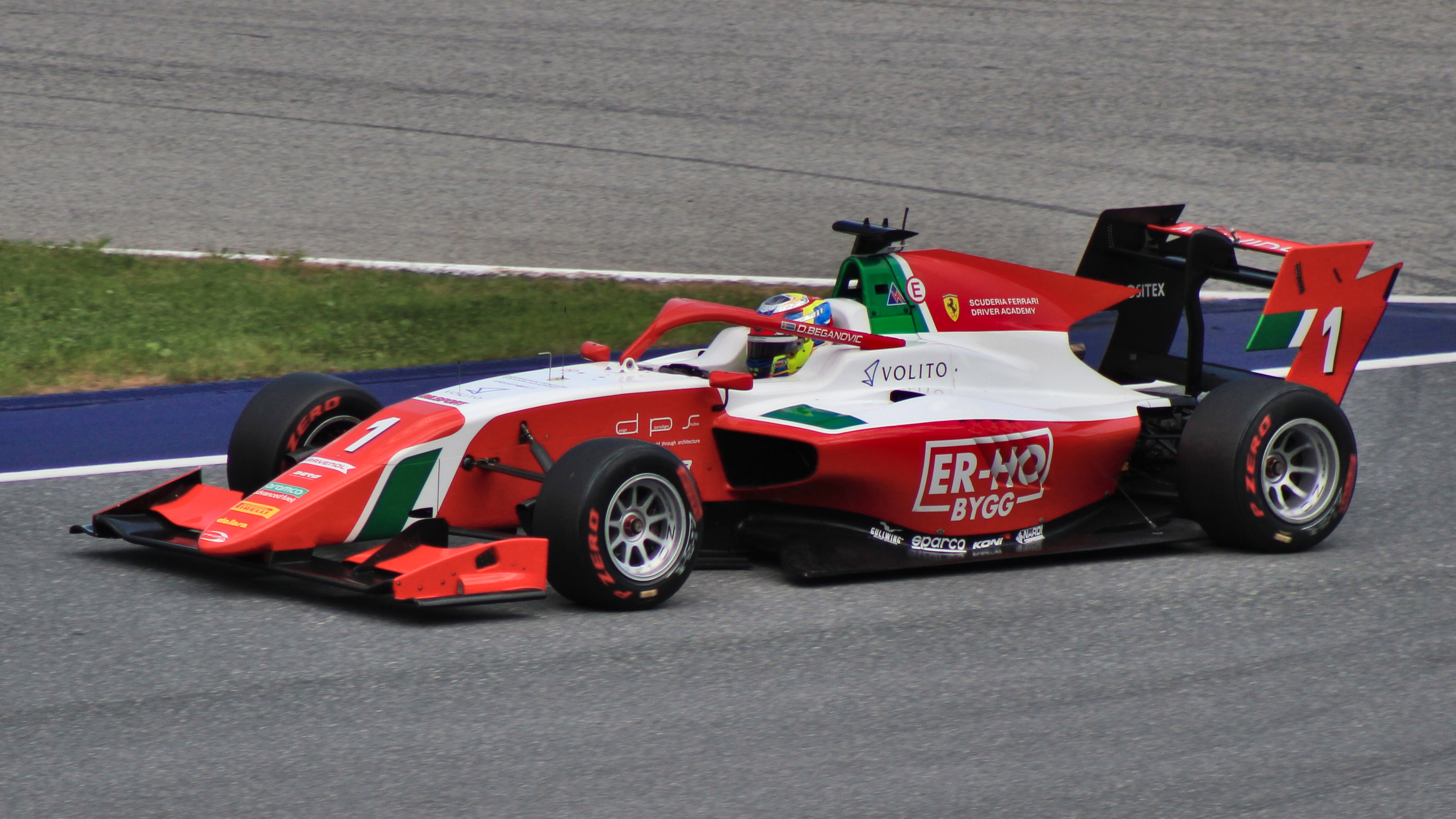
Prema Racing successfully defended their Teams' Championship title.

The 2024 FIA Formula 3 Championship was a motor racing championship for Formula 3 cars sanctioned by the Fédération Internationale de l'Automobile (FIA). The championship was the fifteenth season of Formula 3 racing and the sixth season run under the FIA Formula 3 Championship moniker. It was an open-wheel racing category serving as the third tier of formula racing in the FIA Global Pathway. The category was run in support of selected rounds of the 2024 FIA Formula One World Championship. As the championship was a spec series, all teams and drivers competing in the championship ran the same car, the Dallara F3 2019.

Leonardo Fornaroli won the championship in his second year with Trident, yet did not take a single race victory throughout the season, becoming the first winless champion in FIA Formula 3 history. Prema Racing entered the championship as the reigning Teams' Champions, having secured their title at the final race of the 2023 season in Monza. They also secured the Teams' Championship title in 2024.

2024 was the final year using the Dallara F3 2019 chassis, which debuted in the inaugural 2019 season. Starting in 2025, a new chassis was introduced, the Dallara F3 2025.

== Entries ==
The following teams and drivers were competing in the 2024 FIA Formula 3 Championship. As the championship was a spec series, all teams competed with an identical Dallara F3 2019 chassis with a 3.4 L (207 cu in) naturally-aspirated V6 engine developed by Mecachrome. All teams competed with tyres supplied by Pirelli.

Entrant	No.	Driver name	Rounds
(Italy) Prema Racing	1	(Sweden) Dino Beganovic	All
(Italy) Prema Racing	2	(Italy) Gabriele Minì	All
(Italy) Prema Racing	3	(United Kingdom) Arvid Lindblad	All
(Italy) Trident	4	(Italy) Leonardo Fornaroli	All
(Italy) Trident	5	(France) Sami Meguetounif	All
(Italy) Trident	6	(Mexico) Santiago Ramos	All
(Netherlands) MP Motorsport	7	(Germany) Tim Tramnitz	All
(Netherlands) MP Motorsport	8	(Poland) Kacper Sztuka	All
(Netherlands) MP Motorsport	9	(Republic of Ireland) Alex Dunne	All
(Spain) Campos Racing	10	(Germany) Oliver Goethe	1–9
(Spain) Campos Racing	10	(Denmark) Noah Strømsted	10
(Spain) Campos Racing	11	(Colombia) Sebastián Montoya	All
(Spain) Campos Racing	12	(Spain) Mari Boya	All
(United Kingdom) Hitech Pulse-Eight	14	(United Kingdom) Luke Browning	All
(United Kingdom) Hitech Pulse-Eight	15	(Norway) Martinius Stenshorne	1–6, 8–10
(United Kingdom) Hitech Pulse-Eight	15	(Australia) James Wharton	7
(United Kingdom) Hitech Pulse-Eight	16	(United Kingdom) Cian Shields	All
(Switzerland) Jenzer Motorsport	17	(Austria) Charlie Wurz	All
(Switzerland) Jenzer Motorsport	18	(United States) Max Esterson	All
(Switzerland) Jenzer Motorsport	19	(Peru) Matías Zagazeta	1–3, 5–10
(Switzerland) Jenzer Motorsport	19	(United Kingdom) James Hedley	4
(Netherlands) Van Amersfoort Racing	20	(Mexico) Noel León	All
(Netherlands) Van Amersfoort Racing	21	(Germany) Sophia Flörsch	All
(Netherlands) Van Amersfoort Racing	22	(Australia) Tommy Smith	All
(France) ART Grand Prix	23	(Australia) Christian Mansell	All
(France) ART Grand Prix	24	(Netherlands) Laurens van Hoepen	All
(France) ART Grand Prix	25	(Bulgaria) Nikola Tsolov	1–8, 10
(France) ART Grand Prix	25	(Finland) Tuukka Taponen	9
(Germany) PHM AIX Racing (1–2) (Germany) AIX Racing (3–10)	26	(Thailand) Tasanapol Inthraphuvasak	All
(Germany) PHM AIX Racing (1–2) (Germany) AIX Racing (3–10)	27	(Italy) Nikita Bedrin (Note: Bedrin is Russian, but competed under an Italian licence as Russian national emblems were banned by the FIA due to the Russian invasion of Ukraine.)	All
(Germany) PHM AIX Racing (1–2) (Germany) AIX Racing (3–10)	28	(Austria) Joshua Dufek	All
(New Zealand) Rodin Motorsport	29	(United Kingdom) Callum Voisin	All
(New Zealand) Rodin Motorsport	30	(Poland) Piotr Wiśnicki	All
(New Zealand) Rodin Motorsport	31	(United Kingdom) Joseph Loake	All

=== Team changes ===
PHM Racing now operated independently of Charouz Racing System, after the latter co-ran the team during the 2023 season. Ahead of the season, PHM also announced the AIX Investment Group as a new title sponsor, changing the team's name to PHM AIX Racing.

After Rodin Cars became Carlin's majority shareholder in 2023 and rebranded it as Rodin Carlin, the Carlin family departed the team, with Rodin taking full ownership and renaming the team Rodin Motorsport.

==== Mid-season changes ====
The AIX Investment Group completed its acquisition of PHM Racing ahead of the third round of the season and rebranded the team to AIX Racing.

=== Driver changes ===
Reigning Teams' Champions Prema Racing saw two of their drivers graduate to Formula 2, with Zak O'Sullivan joining ART Grand Prix and Paul Aron signing with Hitech Pulse-Eight. Their replacements were Gabriele Minì, leaving Hitech Pulse-Eight after finishing seventh in his debut season, and Red Bull junior Arvid Lindblad, graduated from the team's Italian F4 outfit after coming third in 2023.

Trident also recruited two new drivers, as their reigning champion Gabriel Bortoleto left the series to graduate to Formula 2 with Invicta Racing, and Oliver Goethe moved to Campos Racing. The team signed two drivers graduating after two seasons of FRECA: Sami Meguetounif, who drove for MP Motorsport and came ninth in the standings in 2023, and Santiago Ramos, who finished the 2023 season in eleventh with RPM.

MP Motorsport promoted Franco Colapinto to their Formula 2 outfit after already fielding him in the 2023 season finale. The team signed Red Bull junior Tim Tramnitz, who graduated from FRECA after coming third in the 2023 campaign with R-ace GP, to replace him. Jonny Edgar also left the team and the series to race in the European Le Mans Series with Orlen Team AO by TF. His replacement was Kacper Sztuka, the reigning champion of the Formula Winter Series and Italian F4 Championship. With Mari Boya departing MP Motorsport to join Campos Racing the team signed GB3 runner-up Alex Dunne to replace the Spaniard.

Campos Racing signed three new drivers, all of them contesting their sophomore seasons in the championship, as Pepe Martí graduated to the team's Formula 2 outfit and Christian Mansell moved over to ART Grand Prix. Oliver Goethe moved over from Trident after coming eighth in 2023, Mari Boya departed MP Motorsport after ending his 2023 campaign in 17th place and Sebastián Montoya departed Hitech Pulse-Eight, with whom he came 16th.

Hitech Pulse-Eight saw two of their drivers move to different teams, with Gabriele Minì joining Prema Racing and Sebastián Montoya joining Campos Racing. Filling these seats were Martinius Stenshorne and Cian Shields, runners-up in FRECA and Euroformula Open, respectively.

Jenzer Motorsport driver Alex García left the championship and was to join Isotta Fraschini in the Hypercar division of the World Endurance Championship before being replaced by Carl Bennett. Matías Zagazeta replaced him, graduating to FIA Formula 3 after spending two years in FRECA culminating in a 22nd place with R-ace GP in 2023. Charlie Wurz, son of former F1 driver Alexander Wurz, also joined him, stepping up from Formula Regional competition after winning the 2023 FROC. Formula Ford Festival winner Max Esterson completed the team's lineup after debuting during the 2023 season, where he entered two rounds for Rodin Carlin.

Van Amersfoort Racing signed reigning Euroformula Open Champion Noel León, replacing Caio Collet. Rafael Villagómez also departed the team and was replaced by Sophia Flörsch, the first woman to score points in Formula 3's modern era, who left PHM AIX Racing after she came 23rd with the team in 2023.

ART Grand Prix recruited Christian Mansell, who left Campos Racing after concluding the 2023 campaign with 12th place in the standings, to replace Grégoire Saucy, who left the series to join United Autosports in the World Endurance Championship's new LMGT3 class. The team also promoted Laurens van Hoepen from the outfit's FRECA team after he came tenth with them in the 2023 championship.

PHM AIX Racing saw their driver Sophia Flörsch move to Van Amersfoort Racing. Joshua Dufek replaced her, graduating from FRECA and Euroformula Open after already debuting in the final round of the 2023 season with Campos Racing. Tasanapol Inthraphuvasak joined him, graduating from the Eurocup-3 championship where he came sixth with Campos Racing. Nikita Bedrin filled the final seat, switching over from Jenzer Motorsport for his second season in FIA Formula 3.

Rodin driver Oliver Gray left the series and single-seater racing to move to the European Le Mans Series with Inter Europol Competition. He was replaced by reigning GB3 Champion Callum Voisin. Another GB3 graduate in Joseph Loake, who finished the 2023 season in third with JHR Developments, joined him. Piotr Wiśnicki completed Rodin's lineup, returning to FIA Formula 3 after a part-time campaign with PHM Racing by Charouz in 2023.

==== Mid-season changes ====
Jenzer Motorsport driver Matías Zagazeta was forced to miss the round at Monaco due to a case of appendicitis. He was replaced by GB3 race-winner James Hedley.

Hitech Pulse-Eight driver Martinius Stenshorne received a suspension from the seventh round at Silverstone Circuit. He had competed in the Silverstone round of the GB3 Championship in April without prior FIA approval and was judged to have gained an illegal sporting advantage. Formula Regional European Championship driver James Wharton replaced him for this round.

Similarly to Stenshorne, ART Grand Prix driver Nikola Tsolov received a suspension from the ninth round at Spa-Francorchamps. He had competed in the Eurocup-3 round at the same circuit in April without prior FIA approval. Formula Regional Middle East Champion and Ferrari junior Tuukka Taponen took his place.

Ahead of the final round at Monza, title contender Oliver Goethe vacated his seat at Campos Racing and moved up to Formula 2 with MP Motorsport to replace the Formula One-bound Franco Colapinto. The Campos seat was filled by Formula Regional European Championship driver Noah Strømsted.

== Race calendar ==
Round	Circuit	Sprint race	Feature race
1	Bahrain International Circuit, Sakhir	1 March	2 March
2	(Australia) Albert Park Circuit, Melbourne	23 March	24 March
3	(Italy) Imola Circuit, Imola	18 May	19 May
4	Circuit de Monaco, Monaco	25 May	26 May
5	(Spain) Circuit de Barcelona-Catalunya, Montmeló	22 June	23 June
6	(Austria) Red Bull Ring, Spielberg	29 June	30 June
7	(United Kingdom) Silverstone Circuit, Silverstone	6 July	7 July
8	(Hungary) Hungaroring, Mogyoród	20 July	21 July
9	(Belgium) Circuit de Spa-Francorchamps, Stavelot	27 July	28 July
10	(Italy) Monza Circuit, Monza	31 August	1 September

=== Calendar changes ===
- The FIA Formula 3 Championship returned to Imola after the round in 2023 was cancelled as a result of mass flooding, which affected the region.

== Regulation changes ==
=== Technical regulations ===
- FIA Formula 3 ran with 55% sustainable fuel supplied by Aramco in 2023. An increase in sustainability was implemented for 2024 to continue working towards the usage of 100% sustainable fuel by 2027.
- After multiple races in 2023 had to be shortened because of concerns regarding the durability of Pirelli's medium tyre, a new specification of tyres was introduced.

=== Sporting regulations ===
From this season, a new rule in order to try and prevent drivers benefitting from causing red flags during qualifying sessions was brought in for both the Formula 2 and FIA Formula 3 championships. Thus, if the stewards deemed a driver to be the sole cause for the issuing of a red flag, the driver responsible had their fastest lap time of that session deleted and was prevented from taking any further part in that session.

== Season report ==
=== Round 1: Bahrain ===
Laurens van Hoepen qualified twelfth and thus started the reverse-grid sprint race from first place. His ART teammate Nikola Tsolov took the lead at the first corner and the two drivers continued competing for first position for much of the race. Arvid Lindblad, who started fourth, took advantage of the battle in front and overtook both drivers to claim the race win on his FIA Formula 3 debut. He was joined on the podium by Van Hoepen, also on his debut race, and Leonardo Fornaroli, who had passed Tsolov in the closing laps.

Dino Beganovic had set the fastest qualifying time on Friday to claim feature race pole position, followed by Luke Browning and Gabriele Minì. Beganovic encountered an issue off the start line and was overtaken by the entire field before the first corner. The lead therefore passed to Browning, with Sami Meguetounif and Tim Tramnitz improving to the podium positions. However, eighth-place starter Christian Mansell had a good start and had claimed second place by lap five. He ran close behind Browning for most of the race but was unable to pass, so the Hitech driver took his first FIA Formula 3 victory, with Tramnitz completing the podium on his debut weekend.

At the conclusion of the round, Browning led the Drivers' Championship by four points over Tramnitz.

=== Round 2: Australia ===
Van Hoepen started the sprint race from the front, again. Martinius Stenshorne and he exchanged the lead multiple times in the early laps. Stenshorne ultimately held the position, ahead of Lindblad, who had relegated Van Hoepen to third. Stenshorne's victory was his first FIA Formula 3 podium finish.

Fornaroli qualified in first place for the feature race, ahead of Minì and Beganovic. Fornaroli led away at the start and through the first safety car restart, but lost the lead to Beganovic on lap 14. Minì had lost third place to Luke Browning but recovered it on the penultimate lap. Beganovic's victory was his first in the category, making it four new winners in four races.

At the end of the round, Browning and Fornaroli were tied on points at the top of the championship – with Browning ahead by virtue of having won a race – five points ahead of Minì.

=== Round 3: Italy (Imola) ===
Kacper Sztuka started the sprint race from first place, but was overtaken by Noel León at the first corner. León held the position ahead of Oliver Goethe and Tim Tramnitz through four safety car restarts. A virtual safety car was deployed on the penultimate lap after sixth-place Browning collided with Sztuka and retired in the gravel. Racing resumed on the final lap, and a faster reaction from Goethe allowed him to gain the lead from León and cross the finish line first. Goethe was initially penalised for a safety car procedure infringement, but the penalty was later reversed and his position reinstated.

Trident achieved a 1-2-3 classification in qualifying, with Santiago Ramos on feature race pole position, ahead of teammates Fornaroli and Meguetounif. Ramos held the lead at the start of the feature race, but was overtaken by Fornaroli on lap three and would ultimately drop to eighth place by the end. Goethe, who started seventh, made his way up to second place and then gained the lead when Fornaroli slowed with a mechanical issue. This allowed Meguetounif into second place, who then caught and passed Goethe with four laps remaining. Meguetounif achieved his first win and podium in the category and was joined on the podium by Goethe and Fornaroli.

The latter now led the Drivers' Championship by three points over Browning.

=== Round 4: Monaco ===
Tsolov started the sprint race in first and maintained the place, whilst Tramnitz claimed second place from Van Hoepen at the first corner. Mansell and Lindblad collided at Casino Square, leading to their own and three other drivers' retirements. The race was red-flagged to clear the track. Tsolov held his position at the restart and through a later safety car restart to claim his first victory in the category.

Minì led the start of the feature race ahead of Mansell and Browning. Racing was interrupted by three safety cars, but the top three drivers maintained their places through each restart and Minì took his first win of the season.

His victory promoted him to the lead of the Drivers' Championship, four points ahead of Browning.

=== Round 5: Spain ===
Ramos started the sprint race from first place. Second-placed Meguetounif tried to overtake but collided with him, bringing out the safety car and allowing Mari Boya into the lead. Boya stayed in front until the end of the race, which finished under safety car conditions because of a clash between Sebastián Montoya and Gabriele Minì, taking his first victory in the series, ahead of Alex Dunne, claiming his first podium, and Oliver Goethe.

Mansell achieved his first FIA Formula 3 pole position in Friday qualifying and led at the start, but he was overtaken by Lindblad on lap five. Browning passed Tsolov for third place early in the race but later lost the position to Fornaroli. Lindblad claimed his second victory of the season, with Mansell and Fornaroli completing the top three.

Championship leader Minì failed to score in Barcelona and dropped to third in the standings, whilst Fornaroli's podium promoted him to the lead, five points ahead of Browning.

=== Round 6: Austria ===
Stenshorne started the reverse-grid sprint race in first, but he was down in third by the end of the first lap. Mansell and Tsolov fought for the lead until the closing stages of the race, passing each other multiple times. A high-speed collision between Montoya and Dunne in a battle for fourth place brought out the safety car, under which the race ended. Tsolov and Stenshorne both passed Mansell shortly before racing was paused, allowing Tsolov to take his second win of the season.

Browning had qualified first for the feature race, whilst championship leader Fornaroli started down in 24th. The Briton held the lead from start to finish, ahead of Minì and Beganovic completing the podium.

Browning's win promoted him to first place in the Drivers' Championship, 11 points ahead of Minì.

=== Round 7: United Kingdom ===
Heavy rain forced the sprint race to be rescheduled from its morning slot to the evening, which Noel León was allowed to start in first. However, he was passed by Lindblad at the first corner. The race was interrupted by a safety car on lap four after an accident involving Esterson and Goethe. Lindblad led the rest of the race and claimed his third win of the season, followed by León and Matías Zagazeta, who took his first podium in the category.

Browning scored his second consecutive pole position for the feature race, ahead of Max Esterson and Sami Meguetounif, but on Sunday, the weather played a central part. Rain had fallen before the start of the race, so most drivers started on wet-weather tyres. But a dry forecast prompted some to switch to slicks at the end of the formation lap. Callum Voisin was one of the few drivers to originally choose slicks; he started in eighth but was first after three laps. An incident between three drivers brought out the safety car on lap five, during which rain fell and Browning utilised his wet-weather tyres to regain the lead. During another safety car intervention on lap eight, the track began to dry, giving back the advantage to the slick runners and allowing Voisin into the lead once again. The Briton initially won the race but was penalised for having made an off-track overtake earlier in the race, demoting him to third place and handing the win to Lindblad.

Minì started fourteenth but finished second to gain the lead of the Drivers' Championship. Lindblad's double victory promoted him to second in the standings, six points behind.

=== Round 8: Hungary ===
Beganovic started the sprint race in first, but he was passed by Nikita Bedrin. He held on to the lead and scored his first FIA Formula 3 victory. Teammate Tasanapol Inthraphuvasak also overtook Beganovic to finish second, marking his first points finish in the series.

Van Hoepen scored his first pole position for the feature race, with Tsolov second and Fornaroli third. The Dutch driver ran wide coming out of the first corner and lost the lead to teammate Tsolov, but he managed to fend off León and Fornaroli for second place. The main title contenders had qualified outside the top 12 and two laps from the end, Lindblad collided with Zagazeta, leading to their retirements and a race finish under safety car conditions. Tsolov scored his third win of the season, while Van Hoepen was disqualified for his car being underweight. Minì and Browning finished outside of the points.

Minì was still in the lead of the Drivers' Championship, but only a couple of points ahead of Browning, Lindblad and Fornaroli.

=== Round 9: Belgium ===
Dino Beganovic started the sprint race in first but immediately lost the lead to teammate and championship leader Minì. Esterson lost control of his car at Raidillon and crashed as a result. While all drivers managed to avoid him, the safety car was brought out to remove the stricken Jenzer car. At the restart, Beganovic retook the lead and stayed there until the end. Minì got under pressure from several drivers behind, but he held on to his position and finished ahead of León.

Callum Voisin had scored his first pole position on Friday and started ahead of Dunne and Fornaroli. Dunne fell back, making room for Montoya into second place. Minì was tagged from the back, spun his car and fell down to last place. The race was neutralised twice due to an accident, in one of which Mansell wiped out Lindblad. Voisin took his first win in the series, ahead of Montoya and Fornaroli.

Fornaroli took over the lead of the championship, one point ahead of Minì and six ahead of Browning.

=== Round 10: Italy ===
Tramnitz began the sprint race in first place and fought off Montoya and Beganovic. The safety car was brought on the second lap, when both León and Bedrin were taken out by other drivers in the first chicane. In the laps after the restart, Santiago Ramos passed Beganovic and Montoya, but the Colombian later regained the place. Another safety car intervention left only one lap of racing, in which Browning, Fornaroli and Minì heavily fought over eighth place. Tramnitz won, ahead of Ramos and Dunne, because Montoya was handed a post-race penalty.

Going into the last race of the season, Fornaroli led the championship by five points over Minì and seven over Browning. Fornaroli started on pole position, while Minì started third and Browning fourteenth. Second-starting Alex Dunne took over the lead at the end of the first lap, before multiple incidents on lap three led to a safety car intervention. Browning was involved and, while he could continue the race, he was out of the championship fight. Minì fell back to fifth on the restart, but when Fornaroli went off track, he was up to third. He looked set to tie his rival on points until, on lap eight, he too went off track. Minì later re-overtook Fornaroli, with Mansell following suit, putting Minì in a championship-winning position. But Fornaroli fought back to overtake Mansell going into the final corner of the final lap, to clinch third place behind Meguetounif and Minì and won the championship by two points, becoming the first FIA Formula 3 champion to not score a race win all season.

After the race, Minì was disqualified because his car did not meet the minimum requirements in tyre pressures, so Fornaroli ended up winning the championship with 153 points over Minì and Browning on 130 and 128 points, respectively.

== Results and standings ==
=== Season summary ===
Round		Circuit	Pole position	Fastest lap	Winning driver	Winning team	Report
1	SR	Bahrain International Circuit		(Netherlands) Laurens van Hoepen	(United Kingdom) Arvid Lindblad	(Italy) Prema Racing	Report
1	FR	Bahrain International Circuit	(Sweden) Dino Beganovic	(Sweden) Dino Beganovic (Note: Dino Beganovic set the fastest lap but did not finish in the top ten, so he was ineligible to score the point for it. Leonardo Fornaroli scored the point for setting the fastest lap among those finishing in the top ten.)	(United Kingdom) Luke Browning	(United Kingdom) Hitech Pulse-Eight	Report
2	SR	(Australia) Albert Park Circuit		(United Kingdom) Luke Browning (Note: Luke Browning set the fastest lap but did not finish in the top ten, so he was ineligible to score the point for it. Mari Boya scored the point for setting the fastest lap among those finishing in the top ten.)	(Norway) Martinius Stenshorne	(United Kingdom) Hitech Pulse-Eight	Report
2	FR	(Australia) Albert Park Circuit	(Italy) Leonardo Fornaroli	(Sweden) Dino Beganovic	(Sweden) Dino Beganovic	(Italy) Prema Racing	Report
3	SR	(Italy) Imola Circuit		(Germany) Oliver Goethe	(Germany) Oliver Goethe (Note: Noel León originally won the race after Oliver Goethe was demoted from first place due to a five-second time penalty for a safety car infringement. After the race, however, Goethe's penalty was overturned and León himself received one for weaving. As a result, Goethe inherited the win.)	(Spain) Campos Racing	Report
3	FR	(Italy) Imola Circuit	(Mexico) Santiago Ramos	(Germany) Oliver Goethe	(France) Sami Meguetounif	(Italy) Trident	Report
4	SR	Circuit de Monaco		(Sweden) Dino Beganovic	(Bulgaria) Nikola Tsolov	(France) ART Grand Prix	Report
4	FR	Circuit de Monaco	(Italy) Gabriele Minì	(Norway) Martinius Stenshorne (Note: Martinius Stenshorne set the fastest lap but did not finish in the top ten, so he was ineligible to score the point for it. Luke Browning scored the point for setting the fastest lap among those finishing in the top ten.)	(Italy) Gabriele Minì	(Italy) Prema Racing	Report
5	SR	(Spain) Circuit de Barcelona-Catalunya		(Italy) Leonardo Fornaroli	(Spain) Mari Boya	(Spain) Campos Racing	Report
5	FR	(Spain) Circuit de Barcelona-Catalunya	(Australia) Christian Mansell	(United Kingdom) Luke Browning	(United Kingdom) Arvid Lindblad	(Italy) Prema Racing	Report
6	SR	(Austria) Red Bull Ring		(Bulgaria) Nikola Tsolov	(Bulgaria) Nikola Tsolov	(France) ART Grand Prix	Report
6	FR	(Austria) Red Bull Ring	(United Kingdom) Luke Browning	(Poland) Piotr Wiśnicki (Note: Piotr Wiśnicki set the fastest lap but did not finish in the top ten, so he was ineligible to score the point for it. Laurens van Hoepen scored the point for setting the fastest lap among those finishing in the top ten.)	(United Kingdom) Luke Browning	(United Kingdom) Hitech Pulse-Eight	Report
7	SR	(United Kingdom) Silverstone Circuit		(United Kingdom) Arvid Lindblad	(United Kingdom) Arvid Lindblad	(Italy) Prema Racing	Report
7	FR	(United Kingdom) Silverstone Circuit	(United Kingdom) Luke Browning	(Italy) Gabriele Minì	(United Kingdom) Arvid Lindblad	(Italy) Prema Racing	Report
8	SR	(Hungary) Hungaroring		(United Kingdom) Joseph Loake (Note: Joseph Loake set the fastest lap but did not finish in the top ten, so he was ineligible to score the point for it. Nikita Bedrin scored the point for setting the fastest lap among those finishing in the top ten.)	(Italy) Nikita Bedrin	(Germany) AIX Racing	Report
8	FR	(Hungary) Hungaroring	(Netherlands) Laurens van Hoepen	(France) Sami Meguetounif (Note: Sami Meguetounif set the fastest lap but did not finish in the top ten, so he was ineligible to score the point for it. Christian Mansell scored the point for setting the fastest lap among those finishing in the top ten.)	(Bulgaria) Nikola Tsolov	(France) ART Grand Prix	Report
9	SR	(Belgium) Circuit de Spa-Francorchamps		(Mexico) Noel León	(Sweden) Dino Beganovic	(Italy) Prema Racing	Report
9	FR	(Belgium) Circuit de Spa-Francorchamps	(United Kingdom) Callum Voisin	(United Kingdom) Callum Voisin	(United Kingdom) Callum Voisin	(New Zealand) Rodin Motorsport	Report
10	SR	(Italy) Monza Circuit		(Italy) Leonardo Fornaroli	(Germany) Tim Tramnitz	(Netherlands) MP Motorsport	Report
10	FR	(Italy) Monza Circuit	(Italy) Leonardo Fornaroli	(Norway) Martinius Stenshorne	(France) Sami Meguetounif	(Italy) Trident	Report

=== Scoring system ===
Points were awarded to the top ten classified finishers in both races. The pole-sitter in the feature race also received two points, and one point was given to the driver who set the fastest lap in both the feature and sprint races, provided that driver finished inside the top ten. If the driver who set the fastest lap was classified outside the top ten, the point was given to the driver who set the fastest lap of those inside the top ten. No extra points were awarded to the pole-sitter in the sprint race as the grid for it was set by reversing the top twelve qualifiers.

Sprint race points

Points were awarded to the top ten classified finishers. A bonus point was awarded to the driver who set the fastest lap and finished in the top ten.

Position	1st	2nd	3rd	4th	5th	6th	7th	8th	9th	10th	FL
Points	10	9	8	7	6	5	4	3	2	1	1

Feature race points

Points were awarded to the top ten classified finishers. Bonus points were awarded to the pole-sitter and to the driver who set the fastest lap and finished in the top ten.

Position	1st	2nd	3rd	4th	5th	6th	7th	8th	9th	10th	Pole	FL
Points	25	18	15	12	10	8	6	4	2	1	2	1

=== Drivers' Championship standings ===
Pos.	Driver	BHR (Bahrain)		ALB (Australia)		IMO (Italy)		MON (Monaco)		CAT (Spain)		RBR (Austria)		SIL (United Kingdom)		HUN (Hungary)		SPA (Belgium)		MNZ (Italy)		Points
Pos.	Driver	SR	FR	SR	FR	SR	FR	SR	FR	SR	FR	SR	FR	SR	FR	SR	FR	SR	FR	SR	FR	Points
1	(Italy) Leonardo Fornaroli	3	7^{F}	9	2^{P}	11	3	9	5	7^{F}	3	12	9	10	7	7	3	9	3	8^{F}	2^{P}	153
2	(Italy) Gabriele Minì	7	6	6	3	6	6	11	1^{P}	Ret	21	6	2	6	2^{F}	14	11	2	13	9	DSQ	130
3	(United Kingdom) Luke Browning	15	1	28	4	26†	4	8	3^{F}	12	5^{F}	11	1^{P}	24	8^{P}	8	12	12	6	6	20	128
4	(United Kingdom) Arvid Lindblad	1	8	2	11	8	7	Ret	4	9	1	Ret	7	1^{F}	1	15	28†	15	Ret	12	16	113
5	(Australia) Christian Mansell	14	2	10	10	12	20	Ret	2	11	2^{P}	3	4	12	13	5	4^{F}	16	21	22	3	112
6	(Sweden) Dino Beganovic	29	13^{P}	13	1^{F}	4	5	7^{F}	6	8	8	15	3	11	19	3	9	1	11	4	9	109
7	(Germany) Oliver Goethe	9	10	5	9	1^{F}	2^{F}	10	10	3	4	7	5	Ret	6	11	8	6	19			94
8	(France) Sami Meguetounif	10	4	17	12	Ret	1	22†	Ret	Ret	15	10	20	8	12	10	25	27	5	5	1	84
9	(Germany) Tim Tramnitz	5	3	12	15	2	11	2	8	10	11	8	15	25	14	4	20	4	9	1	6	81
10	(Mexico) Noel León	22	12	Ret	25	3	19	4	23	6	9	9	23	2	10	12	2	3^{F}	4	Ret	7	79
11	(Bulgaria) Nikola Tsolov	4	11	20	19	13	26	1	27	13	6	1^{F}	6	5	15	29	1			19	17	75
12	(United Kingdom) Callum Voisin	17	21	18	21	Ret	29	12	13	Ret	16	14	25	4	3	6	6	7	1^{P F}	25	22†	67
13	(Netherlands) Laurens van Hoepen	2^{F}	15	3	13	7	13	3	Ret	5	29†	5	8^{F}	9	11	9	DSQ^{P}	10	12	13	8	58
14	(Republic of Ireland) Alex Dunne	12	9	7	16	14	16	Ret	16	2	7	4	10	22	Ret	20	16	23	10	3	4	50
15	(Spain) Mari Boya	8	29	4^{F}	7	Ret	9	6	7	1	14	22	18	16	23	18	10	28	Ret	7	Ret	45
16	(Mexico) Santiago Ramos	21	5	24	24	10	8^{P}	15	14	21	10	24	13	19	16	28	5	8	8	2	18	44
17	(Colombia) Sebastián Montoya	18	17	8	6	25	10	18	15	Ret	12	Ret	Ret	7	Ret	19	19	5	2	11	21	40
18	(Norway) Martinius Stenshorne	11	14	1	26	22	14	16	26	4	27	2	12			13	13	18	Ret	10	5^{F}	38
19	(Italy) Nikita Bedrin	13	20	21	8	9	30	Ret	24	Ret	30†	13	Ret	13	9	1^{F}	7	13	20	Ret	13	25
20	(Australia) Tommy Smith	28	22	27	Ret	24	27	13	12	18	25	21	22	21	4	25	24	25	16	23	15	12
21	(United States) Max Esterson	6	24	26	14	18	21	14	17	22	23	18	17	Ret	18	16	15	Ret	7	Ret	Ret	11
22	(Austria) Charlie Wurz	19	16	11	5	23	24	19	Ret	16	13	20	27	Ret	Ret	17	Ret	26	23	24†	14	10
23	(Poland) Piotr Wiśnicki	25	25	23	23	20	23	21	25	24	24	23	19	14	5	24	21	21	24	Ret	Ret	10
24	(Thailand) Tasanapol Inthraphuvasak	16	19	Ret	Ret	Ret	28	17	18	25	26	27	26	20	20	2	14	29	15	21	11	9
25	(Peru) Matías Zagazeta	Ret	18	15	17	17	17			19	19	17	14	3	22	Ret	27†	17	17	14	Ret	8
26	(United Kingdom) Joseph Loake	27	23	14	Ret	21	25	5	9	15	22	19	24	15	24	26	26	11	25	15	19	8
27	(Poland) Kacper Sztuka	20	28	16	18	5	15	Ret	11	23	28	Ret	16	Ret	17	27	18	20	18	18	12	6
28	(Austria) Joshua Dufek	24	27	22	22	16	22	Ret	20	17	17	25	Ret	23	Ret	22	22	24	14	Ret	10	1
29	(Germany) Sophia Flörsch	23	30†	19	Ret	15	12	Ret	19	20	18	26	11	Ret	Ret	23	23	19	Ret	16	Ret	0
30	(United Kingdom) Cian Shields	26	26	25	20	19	18	Ret	21	14	20	16	21	17	Ret	21	17	22	22	20	Ret	0
31	(Finland) Tuukka Taponen																	14	Ret			0
32	(Denmark) Noah Strømsted																			17	23†	0
33	(Australia) James Wharton													18	21							0
34	(United Kingdom) James Hedley							20	22													0
Pos.	Driver	SR	FR	SR	FR	SR	FR	SR	FR	SR	FR	SR	FR	SR	FR	SR	FR	SR	FR	SR	FR	Points
Pos.	Driver	BHR (Bahrain)		ALB (Australia)		IMO (Italy)		MON (Monaco)		CAT (Spain)		RBR (Austria)		SIL (United Kingdom)		HUN (Hungary)		SPA (Belgium)		MNZ (Italy)		Points

Key
Colour	Result
Gold	Winner
Silver	Second place
Bronze	Third place
Green	Other points position
Blue	Other classified position
Blue	Not classified, finished (NC)
Purple	Not classified, retired (Ret)
Red	Did not qualify (DNQ)
Black	Disqualified (DSQ)
White	Did not start (DNS)
White	Race cancelled (C)
Blank	Did not practice (DNP)
Blank	Excluded (EX)
Blank	Did not arrive (DNA)
Blank	Withdrawn (WD)
Blank	Did not enter (empty cell)
Annotation	Meaning
P	Pole position
F	Fastest lap

Notes:

- † – Driver did not finish the race, but was classified as they completed more than 90% of the race distance.

=== Teams' Championship standings ===
Pos.	Team	BHR (Bahrain)		ALB (Australia)		IMO (Italy)		MON (Monaco)		CAT (Spain)		RBR (Austria)		SIL (United Kingdom)		HUN (Hungary)		SPA (Belgium)		MNZ (Italy)		Points
Pos.	Team	SR	FR	SR	FR	SR	FR	SR	FR	SR	FR	SR	FR	SR	FR	SR	FR	SR	FR	SR	FR	Points
1	(Italy) Prema Racing	1	6	2	1^{F}	4	5	7^{F}	1^{P}	8	1	6	2	1^{F}	1	3	9	1	11	4	9	352
1	(Italy) Prema Racing	7	8	6	3	6	6	11	4	9	8	15	3	6	2^{F}	14	11	2	13	9	16	352
1	(Italy) Prema Racing	29	13^{P}	13	11	8	7	Ret	6	Ret	21	Ret	7	11	19	15	28†	15	Ret	12	DSQ	352
2	(Italy) Trident	3	4	9	2^{P}	10	1	9	5	7^{F}	3	10	9	8	7	7	3	8	3	2	1	281
2	(Italy) Trident	10	5	17	12	11	3	15	14	21	10	12	13	10	12	10	5	9	5	5	2^{P}	281
2	(Italy) Trident	21	7^{F}	24	24	Ret	8^{P}	22†	Ret	Ret	15	24	20	19	16	28	25	27	8	8^{F}	18	281
3	(France) ART Grand Prix	2^{F}	2	3	10	7	13	1	2	5	2^{P}	1^{F}	4	5	11	5	1	10	12	13	3	245
3	(France) ART Grand Prix	4	11	10	13	12	20	3	27	11	6	3	6	9	13	9	4^{F}	14	21	19	8	245
3	(France) ART Grand Prix	14	15	20	19	13	26	Ret	Ret	13	29†	5	8^{F}	12	15	29	DSQ^{P}	16	Ret	22	17	245
4	(Spain) Campos Racing	8	10	4^{F}	6	1^{F}	2^{F}	6	7	1	4	7	5	7	6	11	8	5	2	7	21	179
4	(Spain) Campos Racing	9	17	5	7	25	9	10	10	3	12	22	18	16	23	18	10	6	19	11	23†	179
4	(Spain) Campos Racing	18	29	8	9	Ret	10	18	15	Ret	14	Ret	Ret	Ret	Ret	19	19	28	Ret	17	Ret	179
5	(United Kingdom) Hitech Pulse-Eight	11	1	1	4	19	4	8	3^{F}	4	5^{F}	2	1^{P}	17	8^{P}	8	12	12	6	6	5^{F}	166
5	(United Kingdom) Hitech Pulse-Eight	15	14	25	20	22	14	16	21	12	20	11	12	18	21	13	13	18	22	10	20	166
5	(United Kingdom) Hitech Pulse-Eight	26	26	28	26	26†	18	Ret	26	14	27	16	21	24	Ret	21	17	22	Ret	20	Ret	166
6	(Netherlands) MP Motorsport	5	3	7	15	2	11	2	8	2	7	4	10	22	14	4	16	4	9	1	4	137
6	(Netherlands) MP Motorsport	12	9	12	16	5	15	Ret	11	10	11	8	15	25	17	20	18	20	10	3	6	137
6	(Netherlands) MP Motorsport	20	28	16	18	14	16	Ret	16	23	28	Ret	16	Ret	Ret	27	20	23	18	18	12	137
7	(Netherlands) Van Amersfoort Racing	22	12	19	25	3	12	4	12	6	9	9	11	2	4	12	2	3^{F}	4	16	7	91
7	(Netherlands) Van Amersfoort Racing	23	22	27	Ret	15	19	13	19	18	18	21	22	21	10	23	23	19	16	23	15	91
7	(Netherlands) Van Amersfoort Racing	28	30†	Ret	Ret	24	27	Ret	23	20	25	26	23	Ret	Ret	25	24	25	Ret	Ret	Ret	91
8	(New Zealand) Rodin Motorsport	17	21	14	21	20	23	5	9	15	16	14	19	4	3	6	6	7	1^{P F}	15	19	85
8	(New Zealand) Rodin Motorsport	25	23	18	23	21	25	12	13	24	22	19	24	14	5	24	21	11	24	25	22†	85
8	(New Zealand) Rodin Motorsport	27	25	23	Ret	Ret	29	21	25	Ret	24	23	25	15	24	26	26	21	25	Ret	Ret	85
9	(Germany) PHM AIX Racing (1–2) (Germany) AIX Racing (3–10)	13	19	21	8	9	22	17	18	17	17	13	26	13	9	1^{F}	7	13	14	21	10	35
9	(Germany) PHM AIX Racing (1–2) (Germany) AIX Racing (3–10)	16	20	22	22	16	28	Ret	20	25	26	25	Ret	20	20	2	14	24	15	Ret	11	35
9	(Germany) PHM AIX Racing (1–2) (Germany) AIX Racing (3–10)	24	27	Ret	Ret	Ret	30	Ret	24	Ret	30†	27	Ret	23	Ret	22	22	29	20	Ret	13	35
10	(Switzerland) Jenzer Motorsport	6	16	11	5	17	17	14	17	16	13	17	14	3	18	16	15	17	7	14	14	29
10	(Switzerland) Jenzer Motorsport	19	18	15	14	18	21	19	22	19	19	18	17	Ret	22	17	27†	26	17	24†	Ret	29
10	(Switzerland) Jenzer Motorsport	Ret	24	26	17	23	24	20	Ret	22	23	20	27	Ret	Ret	Ret	Ret	Ret	23	Ret	Ret	29
Pos.	Team	SR	FR	SR	FR	SR	FR	SR	FR	SR	FR	SR	FR	SR	FR	SR	FR	SR	FR	SR	FR	Points
Pos.	Team	BHR (Bahrain)		ALB (Australia)		IMO (Italy)		MON (Monaco)		CAT (Spain)		RBR (Austria)		SIL (United Kingdom)		HUN (Hungary)		SPA (Belgium)		MNZ (Italy)		Points

Key
Colour	Result
Gold	Winner
Silver	Second place
Bronze	Third place
Green	Other points position
Blue	Other classified position
Blue	Not classified, finished (NC)
Purple	Not classified, retired (Ret)
Red	Did not qualify (DNQ)
Black	Disqualified (DSQ)
White	Did not start (DNS)
White	Race cancelled (C)
Blank	Did not practice (DNP)
Blank	Excluded (EX)
Blank	Did not arrive (DNA)
Blank	Withdrawn (WD)
Blank	Did not enter (empty cell)
Annotation	Meaning
P	Pole position
F	Fastest lap

Notes:

- † – Driver did not finish the race, but was classified as they completed more than 90% of the race distance.
- Rows are not related to the drivers: within each team, individual race standings are sorted purely based on the final classification in the race (not by total points scored in the event, which includes points awarded for fastest lap and pole position).
