= 2024 Spielberg Formula 3 round =

Motor racing event

(Austria) 2024 Spielberg Formula 3 round
Round details
- Round 6 of 10 in the 2024 FIA Formula 3 Championship.
- Location: Red Bull Ring, Spielberg, Styria, Austria
- Course: Permanent racing facility 4.318 km (2.683 mi)

Sprint Race
- Date: 29 June 2024
- Laps: 21
Podium
First	(Bulgaria) Nikola Tsolov	ART Grand Prix
Second	(Norway) Martinius Stenshorne	Hitech Pulse-Eight
Third	(Australia) Christian Mansell	ART Grand Prix
Fastest lap
Driver	(Bulgaria) Nikola Tsolov	ART Grand Prix
- Time: 1:23.420 (on lap 7)

Feature Race
- Date: 30 June 2024
- Laps: 26
Pole position
Driver	(United Kingdom) Luke Browning	Hitech Pulse-Eight
Time	1:20.222	
Podium
First	(United Kingdom) Luke Browning	Hitech Pulse-Eight
Second	(Italy) Gabriele Minì	Prema Racing
Third	(Sweden) Dino Beganovic	Prema Racing
Fastest lap
Driver	(Poland) Piotr Wiśnicki	Rodin Motorsport
- Time: 1:23.359 (on lap 3)

The 2024 Spielberg Formula 3 round was a motor racing event held between 28 and 30 June at the Red Bull Ring. It was the sixth round of the 2024 FIA Formula 3 Championship and was held in support of the 2024 Austrian Grand Prix.

== Classification ==
=== Qualifying ===
Qualifying was held on 28 June 2024, at 14:00 local time (UTC+2).

Pos.	No.	Driver	Team	Time/Gap	Grid SR	Grid FR
1	14	(United Kingdom) Luke Browning	Hitech Pulse-Eight	1:20.222	12	1
2	3	(United Kingdom) Arvid Lindblad	Prema Racing	+0.084	11	2
3	7	(Germany) Tim Tramnitz	MP Motorsport	+0.189	10	3
4	2	(Italy) Gabriele Minì	Prema Racing	+0.195	9	4
5	1	(Sweden) Dino Beganovic	Prema Racing	+0.202	8	5
6	10	(Germany) Oliver Goethe	Campos Racing	+0.245	7	6
7	24	(Netherlands) Laurens van Hoepen	ART Grand Prix	+0.295	6	7
8	11	(Colombia) Sebastián Montoya	Campos Racing	+0.326	5	8
9	9	(Republic of Ireland) Alex Dunne	MP Motorsport	+0.341	4	9
10	25	(Bulgaria) Nikola Tsolov	ART Grand Prix	+0.387	3	10
11	23	(Australia) Christian Mansell	ART Grand Prix	+0.387	2	11
12	15	(Norway) Martinius Stenshorne	Hitech Pulse-Eight	+0.443	1	12
13	20	(Mexico) Noel León	Van Amersfoort Racing	+0.458	13	13
14	27	(Italy) Nikita Bedrin (Note: Bedrin is a Russian driver competing under an Italian licence.)	AIX Racing	+0.643	14	14
15	6	(Mexico) Santiago Ramos	Trident	+0.764	15	15
16	5	(France) Sami Meguetounif	Trident	+0.767	16	16
17	16	(United Kingdom) Cian Shields	Hitech Pulse-Eight	+0.776	17	17
18	18	(United States) Max Esterson	Jenzer Motorsport	+0.812	18	18
19	21	(Germany) Sophia Flörsch	Van Amersfoort Racing	+0.834	19	19
20	28	(Austria) Joshua Dufek	AIX Racing	+0.849	20	20
21	22	(Australia) Tommy Smith	Van Amersfoort Racing	+0.854	21	21
22	12	(Spain) Mari Boya	Campos Racing	+0.856	22	22
23	19	(Peru) Matías Zagazeta	Jenzer Motorsport	+0.909	23	23
24	4	(Italy) Leonardo Fornaroli	Trident	+0.938	24	24
25	8	(Poland) Kacper Sztuka	MP Motorsport	+1.077	25	25
26	17	(Austria) Charlie Wurz	Jenzer Motorsport	+1.181	26	26
27	26	(Thailand) Tasanapol Inthraphuvasak	AIX Racing	+1.264	27	27
28	31	(United Kingdom) Joseph Loake	Rodin Motorsport	+1.453	28	28
29	29	(United Kingdom) Callum Voisin	Rodin Motorsport	+1.766	29	29
30	30	(Poland) Piotr Wiśnicki	Rodin Motorsport	+1.836	30	30
107% time: 1:25.837 (+5.615)

=== Sprint Race ===
The Sprint race was held on 29 June 2024, at 09:30 local time (UTC+2).

Pos.	No.	Driver	Team	Laps	Time/Gap	Grid	Pts.
1	25	(Bulgaria) Nikola Tsolov	ART Grand Prix	21	34:24.710	3	10 (1)
2	15	(Norway) Martinius Stenshorne	Hitech Pulse-Eight	21	+0.673	1	9
3	23	(Australia) Christian Mansell	ART Grand Prix	21	+1.244	2	8
4	9	(Republic of Ireland) Alex Dunne	MP Motorsport	21	+1.647	4	7
5	24	(Netherlands) Laurens van Hoepen	ART Grand Prix	21	+3.168	6	6
6	2	(Italy) Gabriele Minì	Prema Racing	21	+3.496	9	5
7	10	(Germany) Oliver Goethe	Campos Racing	21	+3.751	7	4
8	7	(Germany) Tim Tramnitz	MP Motorsport	21	+4.053	10	3
9	20	(Mexico) Noel León	Van Amersfoort Racing	21	+4.498	12	2
10	5	(France) Sami Meguetounif	Trident	21	+4.886	16	1
11	14	(United Kingdom) Luke Browning	Hitech Pulse-Eight	21	+5.258	15^{1}	
12	4	(Italy) Leonardo Fornaroli	Trident	21	+6.118	24	
13	27	(Italy) Nikita Bedrin	AIX Racing	21	+7.077	13	
14	29	(United Kingdom) Callum Voisin	Rodin Motorsport	21	+7.634	29	
15	1	(Sweden) Dino Beganovic	Prema Racing	21	+7.690	8	
16	16	(United Kingdom) Cian Shields	Hitech Pulse-Eight	21	+8.318	17	
17	19	(Peru) Matías Zagazeta	Jenzer Motorsport	21	+8.617	23	
18	18	(United States) Max Esterson	Jenzer Motorsport	21	+8.726	18	
19	31	(United Kingdom) Joseph Loake	Rodin Motorsport	21	+9.162	28	
20	17	(Austria) Charlie Wurz	Jenzer Motorsport	21	+9.519	26	
21	22	(Australia) Tommy Smith	Van Amersfoort Racing	21	+9.811	21	
22	12	(Spain) Mari Boya	Campos Racing	21	+10.759	22	
23	30	(Poland) Piotr Wiśnicki	Rodin Motorsport	21	+10.976	30	
24	6	(Mexico) Santiago Ramos	Trident	21	+11.094	14	
25	28	(Austria) Joshua Dufek	AIX Racing	21	+11.350	20	
26	21	(Germany) Sophia Flörsch	Van Amersfoort Racing	21	+11.767	19	
27	26	(Thailand) Tasanapol Inthraphuvasak	AIX Racing	21	+20.645	27	
DNF	3	(United Kingdom) Arvid Lindblad	Prema Racing	17	Retired	11	
DNF	11	(Colombia) Sebastián Montoya	Campos Racing	16	Collision	5	
DNF	8	(Poland) Kacper Sztuka	MP Motorsport	0	Collision/Suspension failure	25	
Fastest lap set by (Bulgaria) Nikola Tsolov: 1:23.420 (lap 7)

Notes:

- ^1 – Luke Browning was given a three-place grid-penalty after qualifying for impeding Dino Beganovic. As a consequence, Browning started the sprint race from fifteenth place.

=== Feature Race ===
The Feature race was held on 30 June 2024, at 08:30 local time (UTC+2).

Pos.	No.	Driver	Team	Laps	Time/Gap	Grid	Pts.
1	14	(United Kingdom) Luke Browning	Hitech Pulse-Eight	26	37:22.286	1	25 (2)
2	2	(Italy) Gabriele Minì	Prema Racing	26	+1.685	4	18
3	1	(Sweden) Dino Beganovic	Prema Racing	26	+2.154	5	15
4	23	(Australia) Christian Mansell	ART Grand Prix	26	+2.568	11	12
5	10	(Germany) Oliver Goethe	Campos Racing	26	+3.172	6	10
6	25	(Bulgaria) Nikola Tsolov	ART Grand Prix	26	+7.103	10	8
7	3	(United Kingdom) Arvid Lindblad	Prema Racing	26	+7.803	2	6
8	24	(Netherlands) Laurens van Hoepen	ART Grand Prix	26	+9.912	7	4 (1)
9	4	(Italy) Leonardo Fornaroli	Trident	26	+10.280	24	2
10	9	(Republic of Ireland) Alex Dunne	MP Motorsport	26	+13.453	9	1
11	21	(Germany) Sophia Flörsch	Van Amersfoort Racing	26	+13.877	19	
12	15	(Norway) Martinius Stenshorne	Hitech Pulse-Eight	26	+14.097	12	
13	6	(Mexico) Santiago Ramos	Trident	26	+14.568	15	
14	19	(Peru) Matías Zagazeta	Jenzer Motorsport	26	+17.918	23	
15	7	(Germany) Tim Tramnitz	MP Motorsport	26	+18.356	3	
16	8	(Poland) Kacper Sztuka	MP Motorsport	26	+21.323	25	
17	18	(United States) Max Esterson	Jenzer Motorsport	26	+22.259	18	
18	12	(Spain) Mari Boya	Campos Racing	26	+28.984	22	
19	30	(Poland) Piotr Wiśnicki	Rodin Motorsport	26	+30.171	30	
20	5	(France) Sami Meguetounif	Trident	26	+33.932	16	
21	16	(United Kingdom) Cian Shields	Hitech Pulse-Eight	26	+38.975	17	
22	22	(Australia) Tommy Smith	Van Amersfoort Racing	26	+41.837	21	
23	20	(Mexico) Noel León	Van Amersfoort Racing	26	+47.633	13	
24	31	(Austria) Joseph Loake	Rodin Motorsport	26	+1:00.601	28	
25	29	(United Kingdom) Callum Voisin	Rodin Motorsport	26	+1:16.678	29	
26	26	(Thailand) Tasanapol Inthraphuvasak	AIX Racing	26	+1:22.062	27	
27	17	(Austria) Charlie Wurz	Jenzer Motorsport	26	+1 lap	26	
DNF	27	(Italy) Nikita Bedrin	AIX Racing	11	Collision	14	
DNF	28	(Austria) Joshua Dufek	AIX Racing	5	Retired	20	
DNF	11	(Colombia) Sebastián Montoya	Campos Racing	5	Retired	8	
Fastest lap set by (Poland) Piotr Wiśnicki: 1:23.359 (lap 3)

== Standings after the event ==
Drivers' Championship standings

	Pos.	Driver	Points
1	1	(United Kingdom) Luke Browning	106
1	2	(Italy) Gabriele Minì	95
2	3	(Italy) Leonardo Fornaroli	86
1	4	(Sweden) Dino Beganovic	80
2	5	(Australia) Christian Mansell	78

Teams' Championship standings

	Pos.	Team	Points
	1	(Italy) Prema Racing	252
1	2	(France) ART Grand Prix	169
1	3	(Italy) Trident	143
1	4	(United Kingdom) Hitech Pulse-Eight	132
1	5	(Spain) Campos Racing	129

- Note: Only the top five positions are included for both sets of standings.

== See also ==
- 2024 Austrian Grand Prix
- 2024 Spielberg Formula 2 round

== Notes ==
Previous round: 2024 Barcelona Formula 3 round	FIA Formula 3 Championship; 2024 season	Next round: 2024 Silverstone Formula 3 round
Previous round: 2023 Spielberg Formula 3 round	Spielberg Formula 3 round	Next round: 2025 Spielberg Formula 3 round
