= 2023 Barcelona Formula 3 round =

Motor racing event

(Spain) 2023 Barcelona Formula 3 round
Round details
- Round 4 of 9 in the 2023 FIA Formula 3 Championship.
- Location: Circuit de Barcelona-Catalunya, Montmeló, Catalonia, Spain
- Course: Permanent racing facility 4.657 km (2.894 mi)

Sprint Race
- Date: 3 June 2023
- Laps: 21
Podium
First	(United Kingdom) Zak O'Sullivan	Prema Racing
Second	(United Kingdom) Luke Browning	Hitech Pulse-Eight
Third	(Italy) Leonardo Fornaroli	Trident
Fastest lap
Driver	(United Kingdom) Zak O'Sullivan	Prema Racing
- Time: 1:32.054 (on lap 5)

Feature Race
- Date: 4 June 2023
- Laps: 25
Pole position
Driver	(Spain) Pepe Martí	Campos Racing
Time	1:27.587	
Podium
First	(Spain) Pepe Martí	Campos Racing
Second	(Argentina) Franco Colapinto	MP Motorsport
Third	(Sweden) Dino Beganovic	Prema Racing
Fastest lap
Driver	(Spain) Pepe Martí	Campos Racing
- Time: 1:31.964 (on 8)

The 2023 Barcelona Formula 3 round was a motor racing event held between 2 and 4 June 2023 at the Circuit de Barcelona-Catalunya. It was the fourth round of the 2023 FIA Formula 3 Championship and was held in support of the 2023 Spanish Grand Prix.

== Classification ==
=== Qualifying ===
Pos.	No.	Driver	Team	Time/Gap	Grid SR	Grid FR
1	23	(Spain) Pepe Martí	Campos Racing	1:27.587	12	1
2	27	(United Kingdom) Taylor Barnard	Jenzer Motorsport	+0.250	11	2
3	10	(Argentina) Franco Colapinto	MP Motorsport	+0.277	10	3
4	2	(Sweden) Dino Beganovic	Prema Racing	+0.343	9	4
5	1	(Estonia) Paul Aron	Prema Racing	+0.347	8	5
6	5	(Brazil) Gabriel Bortoleto	Trident	+0.418	7	6
7	14	(Colombia) Sebastián Montoya	Hitech Pulse-Eight	+0.485	6	7
8	11	(Spain) Mari Boya	MP Motorsport	+0.495	5	8
9	4	(Italy) Leonardo Fornaroli	Trident	+0.500	4	9
10	8	(Switzerland) Grégoire Saucy	ART Grand Prix	+0.518	3	10
11	16	(United Kingdom) Luke Browning	Hitech Pulse-Eight	+0.554	2	11
12	3	(United Kingdom) Zak O'Sullivan	Prema Racing	+0.602	1	12
13	6	(Germany) Oliver Goethe	Trident	+0.611	13	13
14	26	(Italy) Nikita Bedrin (Note: Bedrin is a Russian driver competing under an Italian licence.)	Jenzer Motorsport	+0.669	14	14
15	25	(Australia) Hugh Barter	Campos Racing	+0.737^{1}	15	15
16	24	(United Kingdom) Christian Mansell (Note: Mansell is an Australian driver competing under a British licence.)	Campos Racing	+0.737^{1}	16	16
17	12	(United Kingdom) Jonny Edgar	MP Motorsport	+0.899	17	17
18	15	(Italy) Gabriele Minì	Hitech Pulse-Eight	+0.937	18	18
19	9	(Bulgaria) Nikola Tsolov	ART Grand Prix	+1.025	19	19
20	17	(Brazil) Caio Collet	Van Amersfoort Racing	+1.037	20	20
21	7	(United States) Kaylen Frederick	ART Grand Prix	+1.260	21	21
22	19	(Australia) Tommy Smith	Van Amersfoort Racing	+1.287	22	22
23	20	(United Kingdom) Oliver Gray	Rodin Carlin	+1.322	23	23
24	18	(Mexico) Rafael Villagómez	Van Amersfoort Racing	+1.431	24	24
25	28	(Mexico) Alex García	Jenzer Motorsport	+1.643	25	25
26	31	(Poland) Piotr Wiśnicki	PHM Racing by Charouz	+1.778	26	26
27	29	(Germany) Sophia Flörsch	PHM Racing by Charouz	+1.901	27	27
28	30	(Brazil) Roberto Faria	PHM Racing by Charouz	+2.014	28	28
29	22	(Israel) Ido Cohen	Rodin Carlin	+2.030	29	29
30	21	(United States) Hunter Yeany	Rodin Carlin	+2.129	30	30
107% time: 1:33.718 (+6.131)

Notes

- ^1 – Both Campos drivers Hugh Barter and Christian Mansell set the identical lap time of 1:28.124, but Barter qualified ahead of Mansell as he set the lap time first.

=== Sprint race ===
Pos.	No.	Driver	Team	Laps	Time/Gap	Grid	Pts.
1	3	(United Kingdom) Zak O'Sullivan	Prema Racing	21	36:53.410	1	10 (1)
2	16	(United Kingdom) Luke Browning	Hitech Pulse-Eight	21	+1.676	2	9
3	4	(Italy) Leonardo Fornaroli	Trident	21	+2.360	4	8
4	5	(Brazil) Gabriel Bortoleto	Trident	21	+3.177	7	7
5	1	(Estonia) Paul Aron	Prema Racing	21	+3.659	8	6
6	10	(Argentina) Franco Colapinto	MP Motorsport	21	+4.164	10	5
7	11	(Spain) Mari Boya	MP Motorsport	21	+5.002	5	4
8	23	(Spain) Pepe Martí	Campos Racing	21	+6.233	12	3
9	27	(United Kingdom) Taylor Barnard	Jenzer Motorsport	21	+7.826	11	2
10	26	(Italy) Nikita Bedrin	Jenzer Motorsport	21	+8.419	14	1
11	6	(Germany) Oliver Goethe	Trident	21	+8.886	13	
12	12	(United Kingdom) Jonny Edgar	MP Motorsport	21	+9.586	17	
13	9	(Bulgaria) Nikola Tsolov	ART Grand Prix	21	+11.982	19	
14	7	(United States) Kaylen Frederick	ART Grand Prix	21	+12.865	21	
15	20	(United Kingdom) Oliver Gray	Rodin Carlin	21	+13.576	23	
16	21	(United States) Hunter Yeany	Rodin Carlin	21	+14.150	30	
17	17	(Brazil) Caio Collet	Van Amersfoort Racing	21	+15.132	20	
18	19	(Australia) Tommy Smith	Van Amersfoort Racing	21	+15.233	22	
19	25	(Australia) Hugh Barter	Campos Racing	21	+15.716	15	
20	15	(Italy) Gabriele Minì	Hitech Pulse-Eight	21	+15.863	18	
21	29	(Germany) Sophia Flörsch	PHM Racing by Charouz	21	+16.509	27	
22	28	(Mexico) Alex García	Jenzer Motorsport	21	+16.882	25	
23	8	(Switzerland) Grégoire Saucy	ART Grand Prix	21	+17.114^{1}	3	
24	31	(Poland) Piotr Wiśnicki	PHM Racing by Charouz	21	+18.006	26	
25	30	(Brazil) Roberto Faria	PHM Racing by Charouz	21	+18.346	28	
26	14	(Colombia) Sebastián Montoya	Hitech Pulse-Eight	21	+20.907^{2}	6	
27	18	(Mexico) Rafael Villagómez	Van Amersfoort Racing	21	+27.218^{1}	24	
DNF	24	(United Kingdom) Christian Mansell	Campos Racing	15	Collision damage	16	
DNF	2	(Sweden) Dino Beganovic	Prema Racing	14	Puncture damage	9	
DNF	22	(Israel) Ido Cohen	Rodin Carlin	0	Collision	29	
Fastest lap set by (United Kingdom) Zak O'Sullivan: 1:32.054 (lap 5)

Notes

- ^1 – Grégoire Saucy and Rafael Villagómez both received a ten-second time-penalty for causing separate collisions with Dino Beganovic and Ido Cohen respectively.
- ^2 – Sebastián Montoya received a five-second time-penalty for failing to follow race director instructions.

=== Feature race ===
Pos.	No.	Driver	Team	Laps	Time/Gap	Grid	Pts.
1	23	(Spain) Pepe Martí	Campos Racing	25	41:21.348	1	25 (3)
2	10	(Argentina) Franco Colapinto	MP Motorsport	25	+4.463	3	18
3	2	(Sweden) Dino Beganovic	Prema Racing	25	+10.445	4	15
4	5	(Brazil) Gabriel Bortoleto	Trident	25	+13.488	6	12
5	1	(Estonia) Paul Aron	Prema Racing	25	+14.156	5	10
6	11	(Spain) Mari Boya	MP Motorsport	25	+19.500	8	8
7	14	(Colombia) Sebastián Montoya	Hitech Pulse-Eight	25	+19.874	7	6
8	3	(United Kingdom) Zak O'Sullivan	Prema Racing	25	+23.707	12	4
9	27	(United Kingdom) Taylor Barnard	Jenzer Motorsport	25	+25.072	2	2
10	24	(United Kingdom) Christian Mansell	Campos Racing	25	+26.155	16	1
11	26	(Italy) Nikita Bedrin	Jenzer Motorsport	25	+27.901	14	
12	17	(Brazil) Caio Collet	Van Amersfoort Racing	25	+28.340	20	
13	25	(Australia) Hugh Barter	Campos Racing	25	+31.930^{1}	15	
14	15	(Italy) Gabriele Minì	Hitech Pulse-Eight	25	+32.354^{1}	18	
15	12	(United Kingdom) Jonny Edgar	MP Motorsport	25	+34.282	17	
16	6	(Germany) Oliver Goethe	Trident	25	+35.843^{2}	13	
17	7	(United States) Kaylen Frederick	ART Grand Prix	25	+37.857	21	
18	20	(United Kingdom) Oliver Gray	Rodin Carlin	25	+39.270	23	
19	9	(Bulgaria) Nikola Tsolov	ART Grand Prix	25	+39.750	19	
20	29	(Germany) Sophia Flörsch	PHM Racing by Charouz	25	+40.313	27	
21	31	(Poland) Piotr Wiśnicki	PHM Racing by Charouz	25	+41.037	26	
22	28	(Mexico) Alex García	Jenzer Motorsport	25	+44.416	25	
23	19	(Australia) Tommy Smith	Van Amersfoort Racing	25	+47.605	22	
24	30	(Brazil) Roberto Faria	PHM Racing by Charouz	25	+52.398	28	
25	18	(Mexico) Rafael Villagómez	Van Amersfoort Racing	25	+58.061	24	
26	22	(Israel) Ido Cohen	Rodin Carlin	25	+59.023	29	
27	8	(Switzerland) Grégoire Saucy	ART Grand Prix	25	+1 lap	10	
DNF	4	(Italy) Leonardo Fornaroli	Trident	21	Retired	9	
DNF	21	(United States) Hunter Yeany	Rodin Carlin	10	Collision damage	30	
DNF	16	(United Kingdom) Luke Browning	Hitech Pulse-Eight	0	Collision damage	11	
Fastest lap set by (Spain) Pepe Martí: 1:31.964 (lap 8)

Notes

- ^1 – Hugh Barter and Gabriele Minì both received a five-second time penalty for exceeding track limits.
- ^2 – Oliver Goethe was given a ten-second time-penalty during the race for causing a collision with Grégoire Saucy.

== Standings after the event ==
Drivers' Championship standings

	Pos.	Driver	Points
	1	(Brazil) Gabriel Bortoleto	92
4	2	(Spain) Pepe Martí	68
1	3	(Sweden) Dino Beganovic	61
2	4	(Italy) Gabriele Minì	56
	5	(Estonia) Paul Aron	54

Teams' Championship standings

	Pos.	Team	Points
1	1	(Italy) Prema Racing	156
1	2	(Italy) Trident	151
	3	(United Kingdom) Hitech Pulse-Eight	117
1	4	(Spain) Campos Racing	73
1	5	(Netherlands) MP Motorsport	62

- Note: Only the top five positions are included for both sets of standings.

== See also ==
- 2023 Spanish Grand Prix
- 2023 Barcelona Formula 2 round

== Notes ==
Previous round: 2023 Monte Carlo Formula 3 round	FIA Formula 3 Championship; 2023 season	Next round: 2023 Spielberg Formula 3 round
Previous round: 2022 Barcelona Formula 3 round	Barcelona Formula 3 round	Next round: 2024 Barcelona Formula 3 round
