= 2024 Barcelona Formula 3 round =

Motor racing event

(Spain) 2024 Barcelona Formula 3 round
Round details
- Round 5 of 10 in the 2024 FIA Formula 3 Championship.
- Location: Circuit de Barcelona-Catalunya, Montmeló, Catalonia, Spain
- Course: Permanent racing facility 4.657 km (2.894 mi)

Sprint Race
- Date: 22 June 2024
- Laps: 21
Podium
First	(Spain) Mari Boya	Campos Racing
Second	(Republic of Ireland) Alex Dunne	MP Motorsport
Third	(Germany) Oliver Goethe	Campos Racing
Fastest lap
Driver	(Italy) Leonardo Fornaroli	Trident
- Time: 1:32.402 (on lap 9)

Feature Race
- Date: 23 June 2024
- Laps: 25
Pole position
Driver	(Australia) Christian Mansell	ART Grand Prix
Time	1:28.463	
Podium
First	(United Kingdom) Arvid Lindblad	Prema Racing
Second	(Australia) Christian Mansell	ART Grand Prix
Third	(Italy) Leonardo Fornaroli	Trident
Fastest lap
Driver	(United Kingdom) Luke Browning	Hitech Pulse-Eight
- Time: 1:31.970 (on lap 9)

The 2024 Barcelona Formula 3 round was a motor racing event held between 21 and 23 June 2024 at the Circuit de Barcelona-Catalunya. It was the fifth round of the 2024 FIA Formula 3 Championship and was held in support of the 2024 Spanish Grand Prix.

== Classification ==
=== Summary ===
Christian Mansell achieved his first FIA Formula 3 pole position in qualifying at the Circuit de Barcelona-Catalunya, followed by Arvid Lindblad and Nikola Tsolov. Santiago Ramos started the sprint race from first place. In the opening laps of the sprint race, second-placed Sami Meguetounif collided with Ramos in an attempt to overtake, bringing out the safety car and allowing Mari Boya into the lead. Boya maintained his lead until the end of the race, which finished under safety car conditions after Sebastián Montoya and Gabriele Minì collided earlier. Boya took his first victory in the category, followed by Alex Dunne with his maiden podium finish, and Oliver Goethe.

Feature race pole-sitter Mansell led at the start but was overtaken by Lindblad on lap five. Luke Browning passed Tsolov for third place early in the race but lost the podium position to Leonardo Fornaroli in the closing laps. In a race which was also the 100th race in the modern Formula 3 era, Lindblad claimed his second victory of the season, with Mansell and Fornaroli completing the top three. Championship leader Minì failed to score in Barcelona and dropped to third in the standings, whilst Fornaroli's podium promoted him to the lead, five points ahead of Browning.

=== Qualifying ===
Qualifying was held on 21 June 2024, at 15:00 local time (UTC+2).

Pos.	No.	Driver	Team	Time/Gap	Grid SR	Grid FR
1	23	(Australia) Christian Mansell	ART Grand Prix	1:28.463	12	1
2	3	(United Kingdom) Arvid Lindblad	Prema Racing	+0.036	11	2
3	25	(Bulgaria) Nikola Tsolov	ART Grand Prix	+0.039	10	3
4	14	(United Kingdom) Luke Browning	Hitech Pulse-Eight	+0.056	9	4
5	10	(Germany) Oliver Goethe	Campos Racing	+0.107	8	5
6	4	(Italy) Leonardo Fornaroli	Trident	+0.209	7	6
7	15	(Norway) Martinius Stenshorne	Hitech Pulse-Eight	+0.224	6	7
8	24	(Netherlands) Laurens van Hoepen	ART Grand Prix	+0.244	5	8
9	9	(Republic of Ireland) Alex Dunne	MP Motorsport	+0.248	4	9
10	12	(Spain) Mari Boya	Campos Racing	+0.321	3	10
11	5	(France) Sami Meguetounif	Trident	+0.345	2	16^{1}
12	6	(Mexico) Santiago Ramos	Trident	+0.410	1	11
13	20	(Mexico) Noel León	Van Amersfoort Racing	+0.454	13	12
14	1	(Sweden) Dino Beganovic	Prema Racing	+0.502	14	13
15	2	(Italy) Gabriele Minì	Prema Racing	+0.523	15	14
16	7	(Germany) Tim Tramnitz	MP Motorsport	+0.550	16	15
17	29	(United Kingdom) Callum Voisin	Rodin Motorsport	+0.569	17	17
18	31	(United Kingdom) Joseph Loake	Rodin Motorsport	+0.632	18	18
19	16	(United Kingdom) Cian Shields	Hitech Pulse-Eight	+0.637	19	19
20	27	(Italy) Nikita Bedrin (Note: Bedrin is a Russian driver competing under an Italian licence.)	AIX Racing	+0.639	20	23^{2}
21	19	(Peru) Matías Zagazeta	Jenzer Motorsport	+0.721	21	20
22	17	(Austria) Charlie Wurz	Jenzer Motorsport	+0.836	22	21
23	26	(Thailand) Tasanapol Inthraphuvasak	AIX Racing	+0.854	23	22
24	21	(Germany) Sophia Flörsch	Van Amersfoort Racing	+0.882	24	24
25	18	(United States) Max Esterson	Jenzer Motorsport	+0.897	25	25
26	8	(Poland) Kacper Sztuka	MP Motorsport	+0.903	26	26
27	11	(Colombia) Sebastián Montoya	Campos Racing	+0.924	27	27
28	28	(Austria) Joshua Dufek	AIX Racing	+0.930	28	28
29	22	(Australia) Tommy Smith	Van Amersfoort Racing	+1.046	29	29
30	30	(Poland) Piotr Wiśnicki	Rodin Motorsport	+1.338	30	30
107% time: 1:34.655 (+6.192)

Notes:

- ^1 – Sami Meguetounif received a five-place grid-penalty for causing a collision with Santiago Ramos at the sprint race.
- ^2 – Nikita Bedrin received a three-place grid-penalty for causing a collision with Callum Voisin at the sprint race.

=== Sprint Race ===
The Sprint race was held on 22 June 2024, at 10:40 local time (UTC+2).

Pos.	No.	Driver	Team	Laps	Time/Gap	Grid	Pts.
1	12	(Spain) Mari Boya	Campos Racing	21	38:11.211	3	10
2	9	(Republic of Ireland) Alex Dunne	MP Motorsport	21	+0.453	4	9
3	10	(Germany) Oliver Goethe	Campos Racing	21	+0.828	8	8
4	15	(Norway) Martinius Stenshorne	Hitech Pulse-Eight	21	+1.068	6	7
5	24	(Netherlands) Laurens van Hoepen	ART Grand Prix	21	+1.263	5	6
6	20	(Mexico) Noel León	Van Amersfoort Racing	21	+1.735	13	5
7	4	(Italy) Leonardo Fornaroli	Trident	21	+1.893	7	4 (1)
8	1	(Sweden) Dino Beganovic	Prema Racing	21	+2.197	14	3
9	3	(United Kingdom) Arvid Lindblad	Prema Racing	21	+2.698	11	2
10	7	(Germany) Tim Tramnitz	MP Motorsport	21	+2.964	16	1
11	23	(Australia) Christian Mansell	ART Grand Prix	21	+3.111	12	
12	14	(United Kingdom) Luke Browning	Hitech Pulse-Eight	21	+3.375	9	
13	25	(Bulgaria) Nikola Tsolov	ART Grand Prix	21	+3.936	10	
14	16	(United Kingdom) Cian Shields	Hitech Pulse-Eight	21	+4.213	19	
15	31	(United Kingdom) Joseph Loake	Rodin Motorsport	21	+4.652	18	
16	17	(Austria) Charlie Wurz	Jenzer Motorsport	21	+4.982	22	
17	28	(Austria) Joshua Dufek	AIX Racing	21	+5.287	28	
18	22	(Australia) Tommy Smith	Van Amersfoort Racing	21	+5.787	29	
19	19	(Peru) Matías Zagazeta	Jenzer Motorsport	21	+6.938	21	
20	21	(Germany) Sophia Flörsch	Van Amersfoort Racing	21	+7.117	24	
21	6	(Mexico) Santiago Ramos	Trident	21	+7.370	1	
22	18	(United States) Max Esterson	Jenzer Motorsport	21	+7.849	25	
23	8	(Poland) Kacper Sztuka	MP Motorsport	21	+8.566	26	
24	30	(Poland) Piotr Wiśnicki	Rodin Motorsport	21	+8.760	30	
25	26	(Thailand) Tasanapol Inthraphuvasak	AIX Racing	21	+16.556	23	
DNF	2	(Italy) Gabriele Minì	Prema Racing	17	Collision	15	
DNF	11	(Colombia) Sebastián Montoya	Campos Racing	17	Collision	27	
DNF	5	(France) Sami Meguetounif	Trident	2	Collision damage	2	
DNF	29	(United Kingdom) Callum Voisin	Rodin Motorsport	2	Collision	17	
DNF	27	(Italy) Nikita Bedrin	AIX Racing	2	Collision	20	
Fastest lap set by (Italy) Leonardo Fornaroli: 1:32.402 (lap 9)

=== Feature Race ===
The Feature race was held on 23 June 2024, at 10:05 local time (UTC+2).

Pos.	No.	Driver	Team	Laps	Time/Gap	Grid	Pts.
1	3	(United Kingdom) Arvid Lindblad	Prema Racing	25	39:09.719	2	25
2	23	(Australia) Christian Mansell	ART Grand Prix	25	+4.447	1	18 (2)
3	4	(Italy) Leonardo Fornaroli	Trident	25	+5.627	6	15
4	10	(Germany) Oliver Goethe	Campos Racing	25	+6.498	5	12
5	14	(United Kingdom) Luke Browning	Hitech Pulse-Eight	25	+7.388	4	10 (1)
6	25	(Bulgaria) Nikola Tsolov	ART Grand Prix	25	+10.671	3	8
7	9	(Republic of Ireland) Alex Dunne	MP Motorsport	25	+10.933	9	6
8	1	(Sweden) Dino Beganovic	Prema Racing	25	+13.419	13	4
9	20	(Mexico) Noel León	Van Amersfoort Racing	25	+14.159	12	2
10	6	(Mexico) Santiago Ramos	Trident	25	+14.635	11	1
11	7	(Germany) Tim Tramnitz	MP Motorsport	25	+15.962	15	
12	11	(Colombia) Sebastián Montoya	Campos Racing	25	+20.416	27	
13	17	(Austria) Charlie Wurz	Jenzer Motorsport	25	+21.193	21	
14	12	(Spain) Mari Boya	Campos Racing	25	+21.883	10	
15	5	(France) Sami Meguetounif	Trident	25	+22.442	16^{1}	
16	29	(United Kingdom) Callum Voisin	Rodin Motorsport	25	+23.130	17	
17	28	(Austria) Joshua Dufek	AIX Racing	25	+24.231	28	
18	21	(Germany) Sophia Flörsch	Van Amersfoort Racing	25	+25.842	24	
19	19	(Peru) Matías Zagazeta	Jenzer Motorsport	25	+27.488	20	
20	16	(United Kingdom) Cian Shields	Hitech Pulse-Eight	25	+33.433	19	
21	2	(Italy) Gabriele Minì	Prema Racing	25	+34.379	14	
22	31	(United Kingdom) Joseph Loake	Rodin Motorsport	25	+37.395	18	
23	18	(United States) Max Esterson	Jenzer Motorsport	25	+38.305	25	
24	30	(Poland) Piotr Wiśnicki	Rodin Motorsport	25	+38.901	30	
25	22	(Australia) Tommy Smith	Van Amersfoort Racing	25	+39.534	29	
26	26	(Thailand) Tasanapol Inthraphuvasak	AIX Racing	25	+40.613	22	
27	15	(Norway) Martinius Stenshorne	Hitech Pulse-Eight	25	+41.328	7	
28	8	(Poland) Kacper Sztuka	MP Motorsport	25	+47.566	26	
29^{2}	24	(Netherlands) Laurens van Hoepen	ART Grand Prix	24	+1 lap	8	
DNF	27	(Italy) Nikita Bedrin	AIX Racing	22	Retired	23^{3}	
Fastest lap set by (United Kingdom) Luke Browning: 1:31.970 (lap 3)

Notes:

- ^1 – Sami Meguetounif received a five-place grid-penalty for causing a collision with Santiago Ramos at the sprint race.
- ^2 – Laurens van Hoepen retired, but was classified as he completed over 90% of the race distance.
- ^3 – Nikita Bedrin received a three-place grid-penalty for causing a collision with Callum Voisin at the sprint race.

== Standings after the event ==
Drivers' Championship standings

	Pos.	Driver	Points
2	1	(Italy) Leonardo Fornaroli	84
	2	(United Kingdom) Luke Browning	79
2	3	(Italy) Gabriele Minì	72
1	4	(United Kingdom) Arvid Lindblad	71
1	5	(Sweden) Dino Beganovic	65

Teams' Championship standings

Pos.	Team	Points
1	(Italy) Prema Racing	208
2	(Italy) Trident	140
3	(France) ART Grand Prix	117
4	(Spain) Campos Racing	115
5	(United Kingdom) Hitech Pulse-Eight	96

- Note: Only the top five positions are included for both sets of standings.

== See also ==
- 2024 Spanish Grand Prix
- 2024 Barcelona Formula 2 round

== Notes ==
Previous round: 2024 Monte Carlo Formula 3 round	FIA Formula 3 Championship; 2024 season	Next round: 2024 Spielberg Formula 3 round
Previous round: 2023 Barcelona Formula 3 round	Barcelona Formula 3 round	Next round: 2025 Barcelona Formula 3 round
