= 2024 Spa-Francorchamps Formula 3 round =

Motor racing event

(Belgium) 2024 Spa-Francorchamps Formula 3 round
Round details
- Round 9 of 10 in the 2024 FIA Formula 3 Championship.
- Layout of the Circuit de Spa-Francorchamps
- Location: Circuit de Spa-Francorchamps, Stavelot, Belgium
- Course: Permanent racing facility 7.004 km (4.352 mi)

Sprint Race
- Date: 27 July 2024
- Laps: 12
Podium
First	(Sweden) Dino Beganovic	Prema Racing
Second	(Italy) Gabriele Minì	Prema Racing
Third	(Mexico) Noel León	Van Amersfoort Racing
Fastest lap
Driver	(Mexico) Noel León	Van Amersfoort Racing
- Time: 2:08.683 (on lap 12)

Feature Race
- Date: 28 July 2024
- Laps: 15
Pole position
Driver	(United Kingdom) Callum Voisin	Rodin Motorsport
Time	2:04.321	
Podium
First	(United Kingdom) Callum Voisin	Rodin Motorsport
Second	(Colombia) Sebastián Montoya	Campos Racing
Third	(Italy) Leonardo Fornaroli	Trident
Fastest lap
Driver	(United Kingdom) Callum Voisin	Rodin Motorsport
- Time: 2:05.770 (on lap 15)

The 2024 Spa-Francorchamps Formula 3 round was a motor racing event held between 26 and 28 July at the Circuit de Spa-Francorchamps, Stavelot, Belgium. It was the penultimate race of the 2024 FIA Formula 3 Championship, and was held in support of the 2024 Belgian Grand Prix.

Despite not scoring any points in the Feature race, Prema Racing secured the teams championship for the fifth time in six seasons as their main rival ART Grand Prix failed to score the sufficient amount of points in order to retain in mathematical contention for the Teams' Championship, going into the final round in Monza. It is Prema's fifth Teams' title in six seasons.

== Driver changes ==
ART Grand Prix driver Nikola Tsolov received a suspension from the ninth round at Spa-Francorchamps. He had competed in the Eurocup-3 round at the same circuit in April without prior FIA approval. Formula Regional Middle East champion and Ferrari junior Tuukka Taponen took his place.

== Classification ==
=== Qualifying ===
Qualifying was held on 26 July 2024, at 15:05 local time (UTC+2).

Pos.	No.	Driver	Team	Time/Gap	Grid SR	Grid FR
1	29	(United Kingdom) Callum Voisin	Rodin Motorsport	2:04.321	12	1
2	9	(Republic of Ireland) Alex Dunne	MP Motorsport	+0.123	11	2
3	4	(Italy) Leonardo Fornaroli	Trident	+0.132	10	3
4	11	(Colombia) Sebastián Montoya	Campos Racing	+0.200	9	4
5	20	(Mexico) Noel León	Van Amersfoort Racing	+0.224	5	5
6	18	(United States) Max Esterson	Jenzer Motorsport	+0.224	6	6
7	14	(United Kingdom) Luke Browning	Hitech Pulse-Eight	+0.252	7	7
8	5	(France) Sami Meguetounif	Trident	+0.296	8^{1}	8
9	7	(Germany) Tim Tramnitz	MP Motorsport	+0.299	4	9
10	6	(Mexico) Santiago Ramos	Trident	+0.308	3	10
11	2	(Italy) Gabriele Minì	Prema Racing	+0.339	2	11
12	1	(Sweden) Dino Beganovic	Prema Racing	+0.415	1	12
13	25	(Finland) Tuukka Taponen	ART Grand Prix	+0.437	16^{2}	13
14	10	(Germany) Oliver Goethe	Campos Racing	+0.439	13	14
15	24	(Netherlands) Laurens van Hoepen	ART Grand Prix	+0.579	14	15
16	27	(Italy) Nikita Bedrin (Note: Bedrin is a Russian driver competing under an Italian licence.)	AIX Racing	+0.579	15	16
17	19	(Peru) Matías Zagazeta	Jenzer Motorsport	+0.696	22^{3}	17
18	31	(United Kingdom) Joseph Loake	Rodin Motorsport	+0.911	17	18
19	21	(Germany) Sophia Flörsch	Van Amersfoort Racing	+1.023	23^{1}	19
20	23	(Australia) Christian Mansell	ART Grand Prix	+1.027	18	20
21	15	(Norway) Martinius Stenshorne	Hitech Pulse-Eight	+1.057	19	21
22	12	(Spain) Mari Boya	Campos Racing	+1.181	25^{1}	22
23	30	(Poland) Piotr Wiśnicki	Rodin Motorsport	+1.190	20	23
24	28	(Austria) Joshua Dufek	AIX Racing	+1.311	21	24
25	22	(Australia) Tommy Smith	Van Amersfoort Racing	+1.458	24	25
26	16	(United Kingdom) Cian Shields	Hitech Pulse-Eight	+1.669	26	26
27	3	(United Kingdom) Arvid Lindblad	Prema Racing	+1.813	27	27
28	17	(Austria) Charlie Wurz	Jenzer Motorsport	+1.927	29^{1}	28
29	26	(Thailand) Tasanapol Inthraphuvasak	AIX Racing	+1.976	30^{1}	29
30	8	(Poland) Kacper Sztuka	MP Motorsport	+1.987	28	30
107% time: 2:13.023 (+8.702)

Notes:

- ^1 – Sami Meguetounif, Sophia Flörsch, Mari Boya, Charlie Wurz and Tasanapol Inthraphuvasak all received a three-place grid-penalty for leaving the track and gaining an advantage during qualifying. All drivers had to take the penalty for the next race they entered.
- ^2 – Tuukka Taponen received a three-place grid-penalty for the Sprint Race for impeding Alex Dunne.
- ^3 – Matías Zagazeta received a five-place grid-penalty for causing a collision with Arvid Lindblad during the Feature Race of the previous round in Hungary.

=== Sprint Race ===
The Sprint race was held on 27 July 2024, at 09:50 local time (UTC+2).

Pos.	No.	Driver	Team	Laps	Time/Gap	Grid	Pts.
1	1	(Sweden) Dino Beganovic	Prema Racing	12	29:03.659	1	10
2	2	(Italy) Gabriele Minì	Prema Racing	12	+1.131	2	9
3	20	(Mexico) Noel León	Van Amersfoort Racing	12	+2.872	5	8 (1)
4	7	(Germany) Tim Tramnitz	MP Motorsport	12	+5.800	4	7
5	11	(Colombia) Sebastián Montoya	Campos Racing	12	+6.815	9	6
6	10	(Germany) Oliver Goethe	Campos Racing	12	+7.237	13	5
7	29	(United Kingdom) Callum Voisin	Rodin Motorsport	12	+7.894	12	4
8	6	(United Kingdom) Santiago Ramos	Trident	12	+11.049	3	3
9	4	(Italy) Leonardo Fornaroli	Trident	12	+11.937	10	2
10	24	(Netherlands) Laurens van Hoepen	ART Grand Prix	12	+14.837	14	1
11	31	(United Kingdom) Joseph Loake	Rodin Motorsport	12	+15.976	17	
12	14	(United Kingdom) Luke Browning	Hitech Pulse-Eight	12	+16.812	7	
13	27	(Italy) Nikita Bedrin	AIX Racing	12	+16.943	15	
14	25	(Finland) Tuukka Taponen	ART Grand Prix	12	+18.384	16	
15	3	(United Kingdom) Arvid Lindblad	Prema Racing	12	+20.370	27	
16	23	(Australia) Christian Mansell	ART Grand Prix	12	+22.066	18	
17	19	(Peru) Matías Zagazeta	Jenzer Motorsport	12	+22.454	22	
18	15	(Norway) Martinius Stenshorne	Hitech Pulse-Eight	12	+22.870	19	
19	21	(Germany) Sophia Flörsch	Van Amersfoort Racing	12	+24.773	23	
20	8	(Poland) Kacper Sztuka	MP Motorsport	12	+25.416	28	
21	30	(Poland) Piotr Wiśnicki	Rodin Motorsport	12	+25.974	20	
22	16	(United Kingdom) Cian Shields	Hitech Pulse-Eight	12	+26.347	26	
23	9	(Republic of Ireland) Alex Dunne	MP Motorsport	12	+27.700	11	
24	28	(Austria) Joshua Dufek	AIX Racing	12	+28.283	21	
25	22	(Australia) Tommy Smith	Van Amersfoort Racing	12	+30.721	24	
26	17	(Austria) Charlie Wurz	Jenzer Motorsport	12	+32.293	29	
27	5	(France) Sami Meguetounif	Trident	12	+36.669	8	
28	12	(Spain) Mari Boya	Campos Racing	12	+49.234	25	
29	26	(Thailand) Tasanapol Inthraphuvasak	AIX Racing	12	+52.996	30	
DNF	18	(United States) Max Esterson	Jenzer Motorsport	0	Accident	6	
Fastest lap set by (Mexico) Noel León: 2:08.683 (lap 12)

=== Feature Race ===
The Feature race was held on 28 July 2024, at 08:30 local time (UTC+2).

Pos.	No.	Driver	Team	Laps	Time/Gap	Grid	Pts.
1	1	(United Kingdom) Callum Voisin	Rodin Motorsport	15	41:33.717	1	25 (3)
2	11	(Colombia) Sebastián Montoya	Campos Racing	15	+0.915	9	18
3	4	(Italy) Leonardo Fornaroli	Trident	15	+1.662	3	15
4	20	(Mexico) Noel León	Van Amersfoort Racing	15	+2.191	5	12
5	5	(France) Sami Meguetounif	Trident	15	+2.871	8	10
6	14	(United Kingdom) Luke Browning	Hitech Pulse-Eight	15	+3.229	7	5
7	18	(United States) Max Esterson	Jenzer Motorsport	15	+3.604	6	6
8	6	(Mexico) Santiago Ramos	Trident	15	+4.088	10	4
9	7	(Germany) Tim Tramnitz	MP Motorsport	15	+4.852	9	2
10	9	(Republic of Ireland) Alex Dunne	MP Motorsport	15	+5.345	2	1
11	1	(Sweden) Dino Beganovic	Prema Racing	15	+6.600	12	
12	24	(Netherlands) Laurens van Hoepen	ART Grand Prix	15	+7.271	15	
13	2	(Italy) Gabriele Minì	Prema Racing	15	+8.133	11	
14	28	(Austria) Joshua Dufek	AIX Racing	15	+9.522	24	
15	26	(Thailand) Tasanapol Inthraphuvasak	AIX Racing	15	+10.686	29	
16	22	(Australia) Tommy Smith	Van Amersfoort Racing	15	+11.129	25	
17	19	(Peru) Matías Zagazeta	Jenzer Motorsport	15	+12.148	17	
18	8	(Poland) Kacper Sztuka	MP Motorsport	15	+12.796	30	
19	10	(Germany) Oliver Goethe	Campos Racing	15	+13.274	14	
20	27	(Italy) Nikita Bedrin	AIX Racing	15	+17.763	28	
21	23	(Australia) Christian Mansell	ART Grand Prix	15	+18.380	20	
22	16	(United Kingdom) Cian Shields	Hitech Pulse-Eight	15	+19.997	26	
23	17	(Austria) Charlie Wurz	Jenzer Motorsport	15	+20.236	28	
24	30	(Poland) Piotr Wiśnicki	Rodin Motorsport	15	+20.339	23	
25	31	(United Kingdom) Joseph Loake	Rodin Motorsport	15	+24.758	18	
DNF	3	(United Kingdom) Arvid Lindblad	Prema Racing	9	Collision/Spun off	27	
DNF	12	(Spain) Mari Boya	Campos Racing	9	Accident	22	
DNF	21	(Germany) Sophia Flörsch	Van Amersfoort Racing	6	Collision/Spun off	19	
DNF	15	(Norway) Martinius Stenshorne	Hitech Pulse-Eight	1	Collision	21	
DNF	25	(Finland) Tuukka Taponen	ART Grand Prix	1	Collision	13	
Fastest lap set by (United Kingdom) Callum Voisin: 2:05.770 (lap 15)

== Standings after the event ==
Drivers' Championship standings

	Pos.	Driver	Points
1	1	(Italy) Leonardo Fornaroli	129
1	2	(Italy) Gabriele Minì	128
1	3	(United Kingdom) Luke Browning	123
1	4	(United Kingdom) Arvid Lindblad	113
1	5	(Sweden) Dino Beganovic	100

Teams' Championship standings

Pos.	Team	Points
1	(Italy) Prema Racing	341
2	(France) ART Grand Prix	226
3	(Italy) Trident	217
4	(Spain) Campos Racing	175
5	(United Kingdom) Hitech Pulse-Eight	149

- Note: Only the top five positions are included for both sets of standings.
- Note: Bold name includes the Teams' Champion.

== See also ==
- 2024 Belgian Grand Prix
- 2024 Spa-Francorchamps Formula 2 round

== Notes ==
Previous round: 2024 Budapest Formula 3 round	FIA Formula 3 Championship; 2024 season	Next round: 2024 Monza Formula 3 round
Previous round: 2023 Spa-Francorchamps Formula 3 round	Spa-Francorchamps Formula 3 round	Next round: 2025 Spa-Francorchamps Formula 3 round
