= Tim Tramnitz =

German racing driver (born 2004)

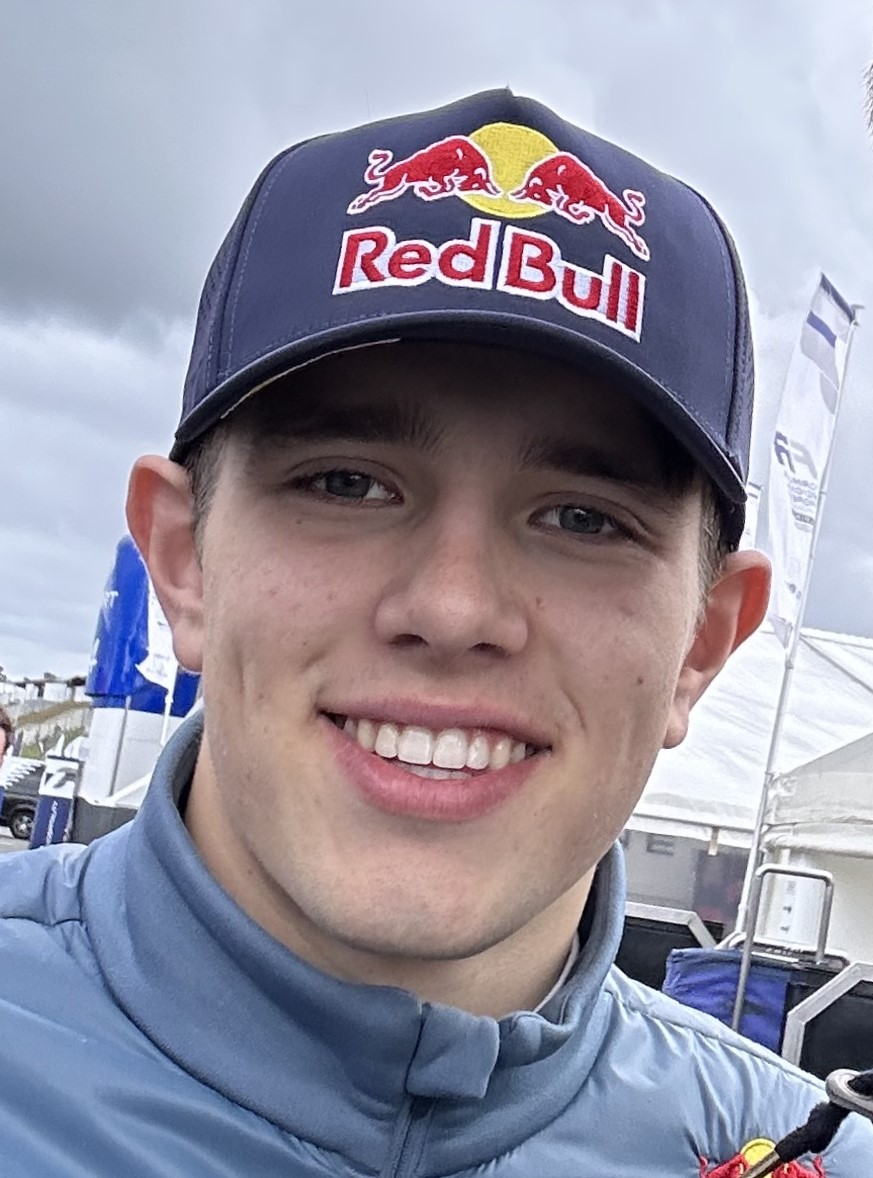
- Tramnitz in 2023
- Nationality: (Germany) German
- Born: 16 November 2004 (age 21) Hamburg, Germany

FIA Formula 3 Championship career
- Debut season: 2024
- Current team: MP Motorsport
- Categorisation: FIA Silver
- Car number: 17
- Starts: 39
- Wins: 2
- Podiums: 7
- Poles: 0
- Fastest laps: 0
- Best finish: 4th in 2025

Previous series
- 2023 2023 2022–2023 2020–2021 2020–2021: Euroformula Open; FR Middle East Championship; FR European Championship; ADAC Formula 4 Italian F4 Championship
- Statistics up to date as of 12 September 2025.

Tim Tramnitz (German pronunciation: [tɪm ˈtʁam.nɪt͡s]; born 16 November 2004) is a German racing driver who is set to compete in the GT World Challenge Europe Endurance Cup for ROWE Racing as a BMW M works driver.

Tramnitz is the 2021 Italian F4 and ADAC F4 runner-up, and later finished third in the 2023 Formula Regional European Championship and fourth in the 2025 FIA Formula 3 Championship. He is a former member of the Red Bull Junior Team.

== Career ==
=== Karting ===
Tramnitz started racing in 2011, competing in local karting championships. After winning the regional Hamburg-based series and the Northern German Kart-Challenge in 2013 and 2014 respectively, he moved into national competitions, where he scored his first and only title in the ADAC Kart Academy series in 2017. He became an ADAC Stiftung Sport protégé in late 2017 and remained in karts until 2019.

=== Formula 4 ===
==== 2020 ====
Having tested a Formula 4 car for the first time in 2019, Tramnitz was announced to be making his single-seater debut in the ADAC Formula 4 Championship in 2020, driving with US Racing. Tramnitz had a solid season, starting the season with a podium during the opening round in Lausitzring. Two rounds later in Hockenheim, Tramnitz returned to the podium in second place. Throughout the season, Tramnitz scored points in all but one race and stood on the podium on six occasions, one capped off with a win in the final race of the campaign at Oschersleben. He finished fourth in the standings with 226 points, beating all but one of his teammates and winning the trophy for the best rookie.

==== 2021 ====
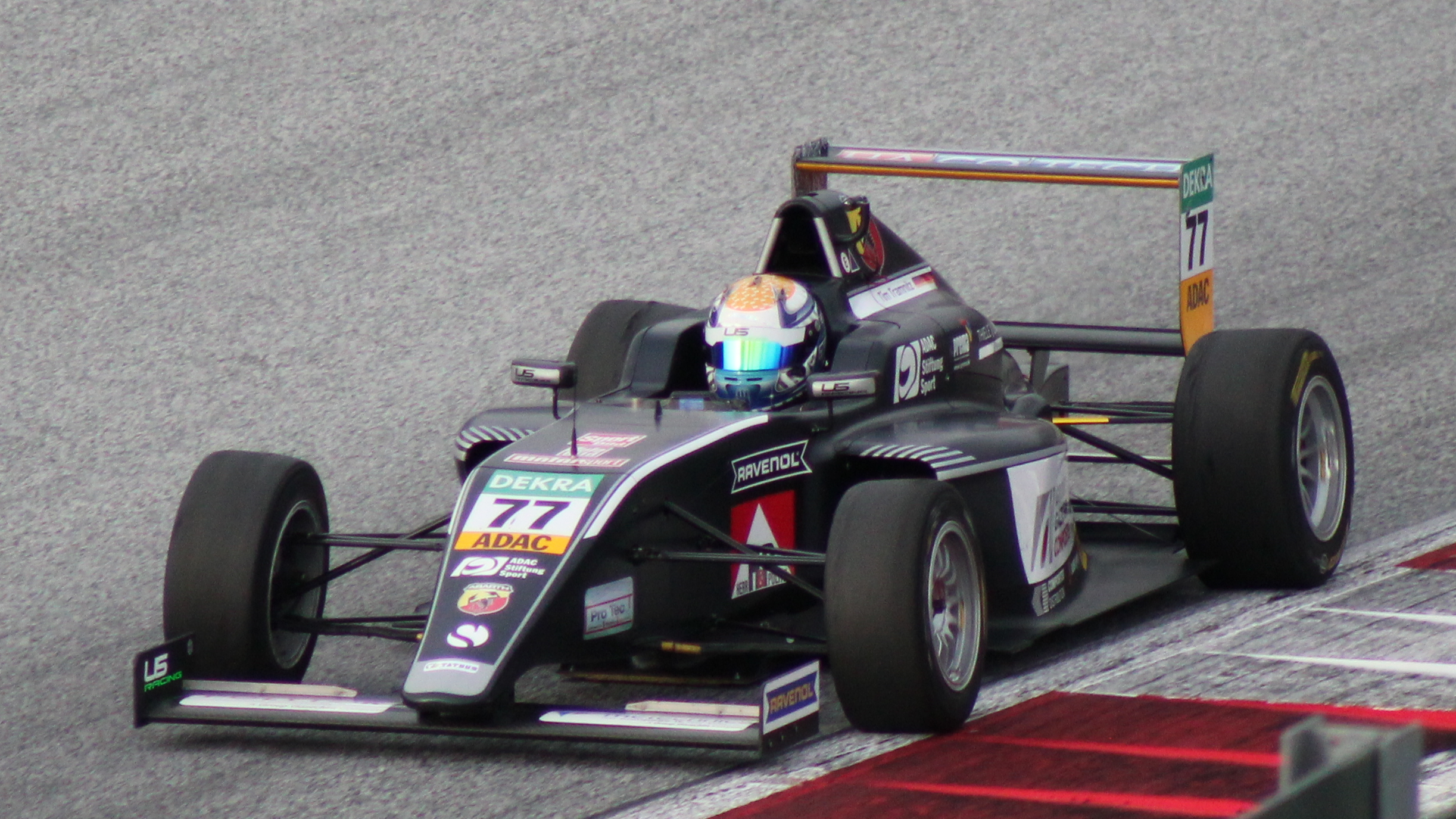
Tramnitz racing in the 2021 ADAC Formula 4 Championship at the Red Bull Ring.

In 2021, Tramnitz returned to ADAC F4 and Italian F4, once again competing with US Racing. He started his ADAC F4 season with a pole and a second place at the Red Bull Ring. After a double third place in Zandvoort, he took his first ADAC F4 win of the season in Hockenheim after a battle with title rival Oliver Bearman. Tramnitz gained form over Bearman during the next two rounds, notching up a double win in the Sachsenring and following it up with a further win in the second Hockenheim round. Sitting 23 points behind Bearman heading into the season finale at the Nürburgring, he was able to win the first race despite a clash with the Briton, but his title chances ended on the opening lap after he was tipped into a spin by Joshua Dufek. Despite that, Tramnitz finished runner-up in the championship with five wins, five poles and nine podiums.

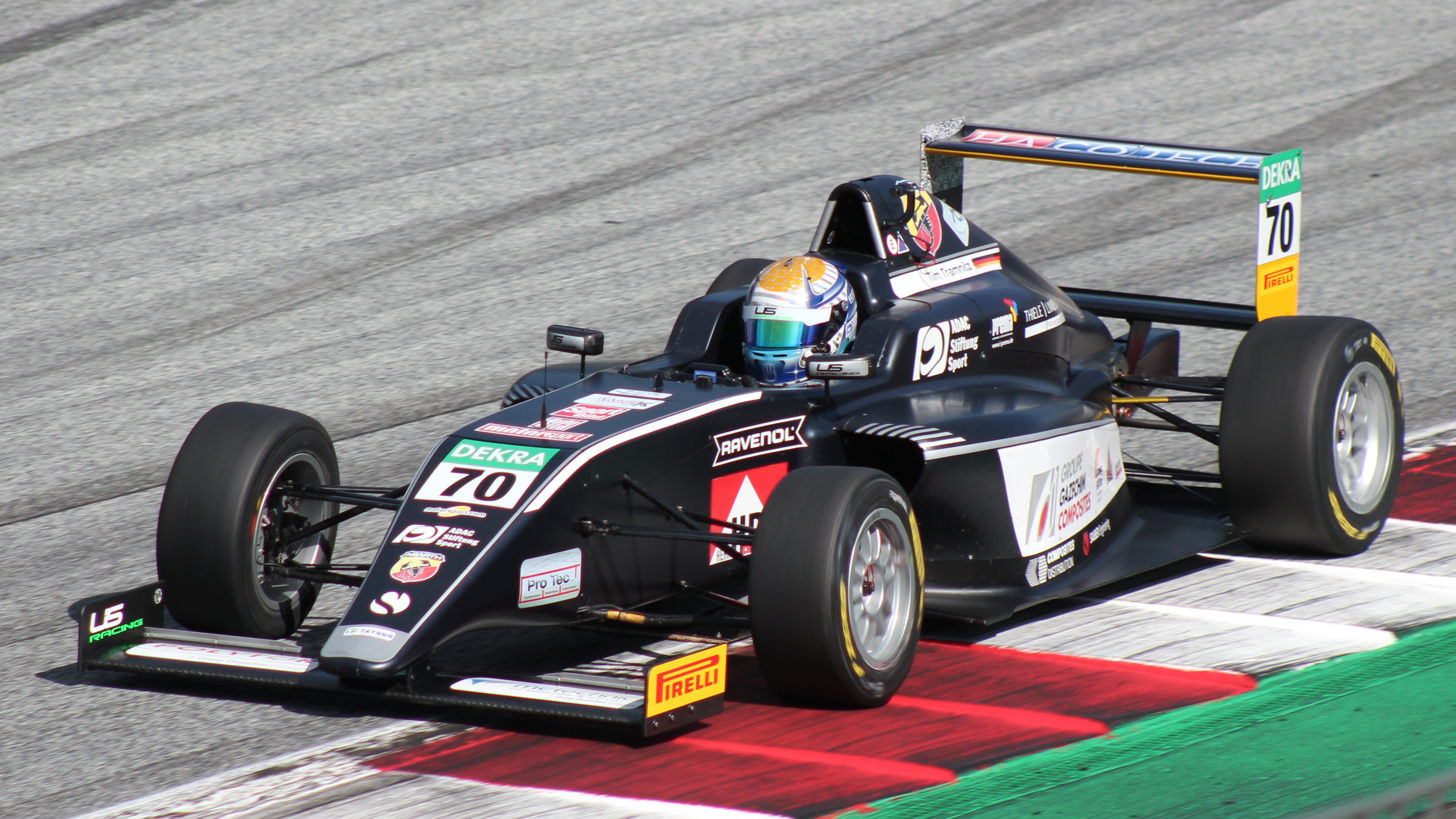
Tramnitz racing in the 2021 Italian F4 Championship at the Red Bull Ring.

In the Italian series, competing in a partial campaign, Tramnitz started strongly with a double win in Paul Ricard. After a triple podium in Vallelunga, he returned to dominant ways in Austria with another double win. Despite scoring points in the remaining two rounds, he did not score a podium. However, with four wins and nine podiums, he again finished runner-up in the standings.

=== Formula Regional European Championship ===
==== 2022 ====
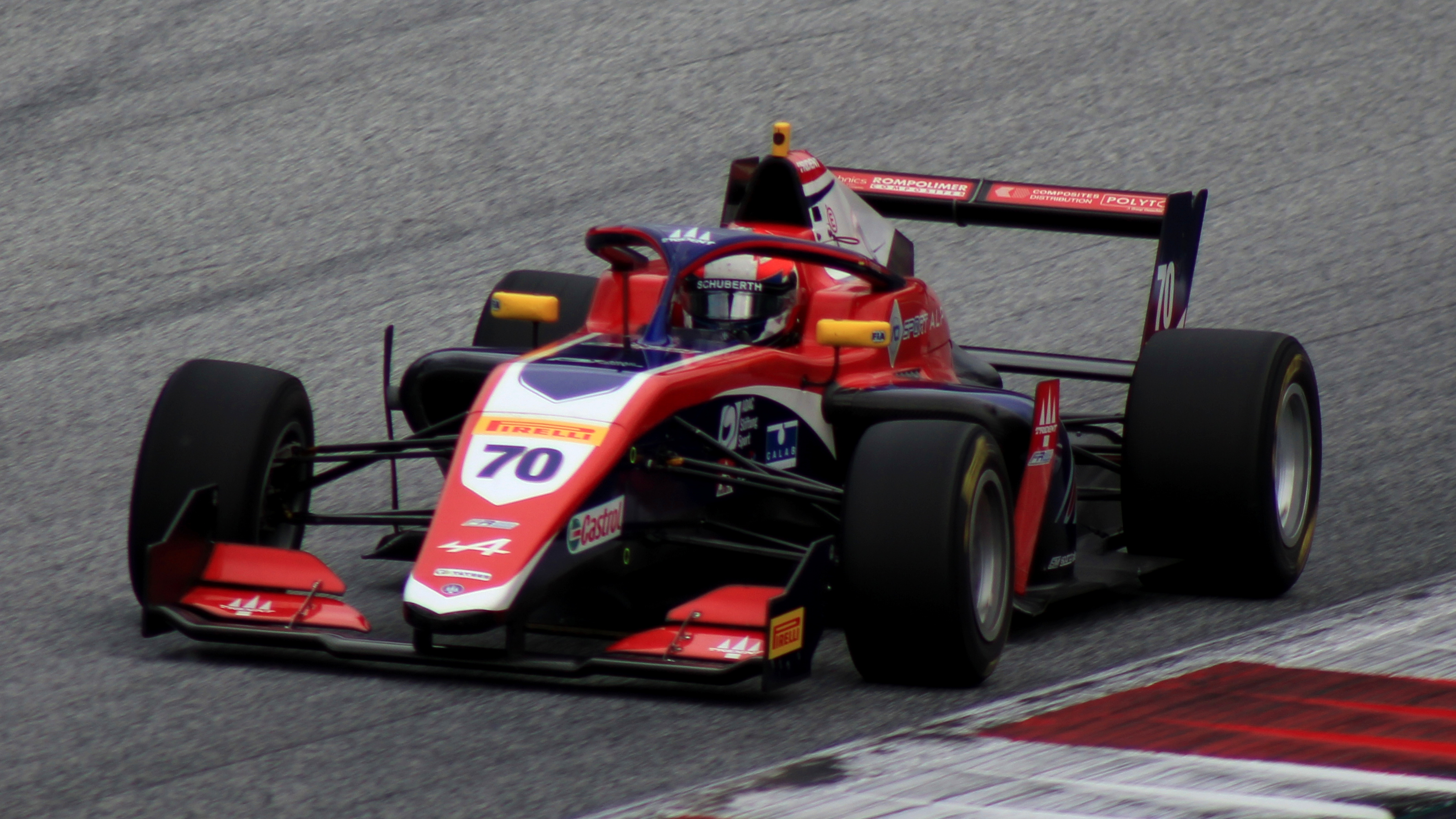
Tramnitz racing in the 2022 Formula Regional European Championship at the Red Bull Ring.

For 2022, Tramnitz progressed to the Formula Regional European Championship, competing for Trident. Pre-season, Tramnitz's preparations were hampered as he suffered a broken veterbrae during a crash in a Formula 4 test at Estoril. He scored his first points in Imola, with a ninth and seventh place finish. However, a string of retirements contributed to a points drought then only ended during the second race in Budapest, where he secured his best finish of the season with fourth place. Having finished in the points three more times, Tramnitz placed 15th in the standings with 35 points, ahead of teammate Roman Biliński but considerably behind Leonardo Fornaroli.

==== 2023 ====
During the pre-season, Tramnitz competed in the final two rounds of Formula Regional Middle East Championship with R-ace GP. He scored 14 points and finished 20th overall.

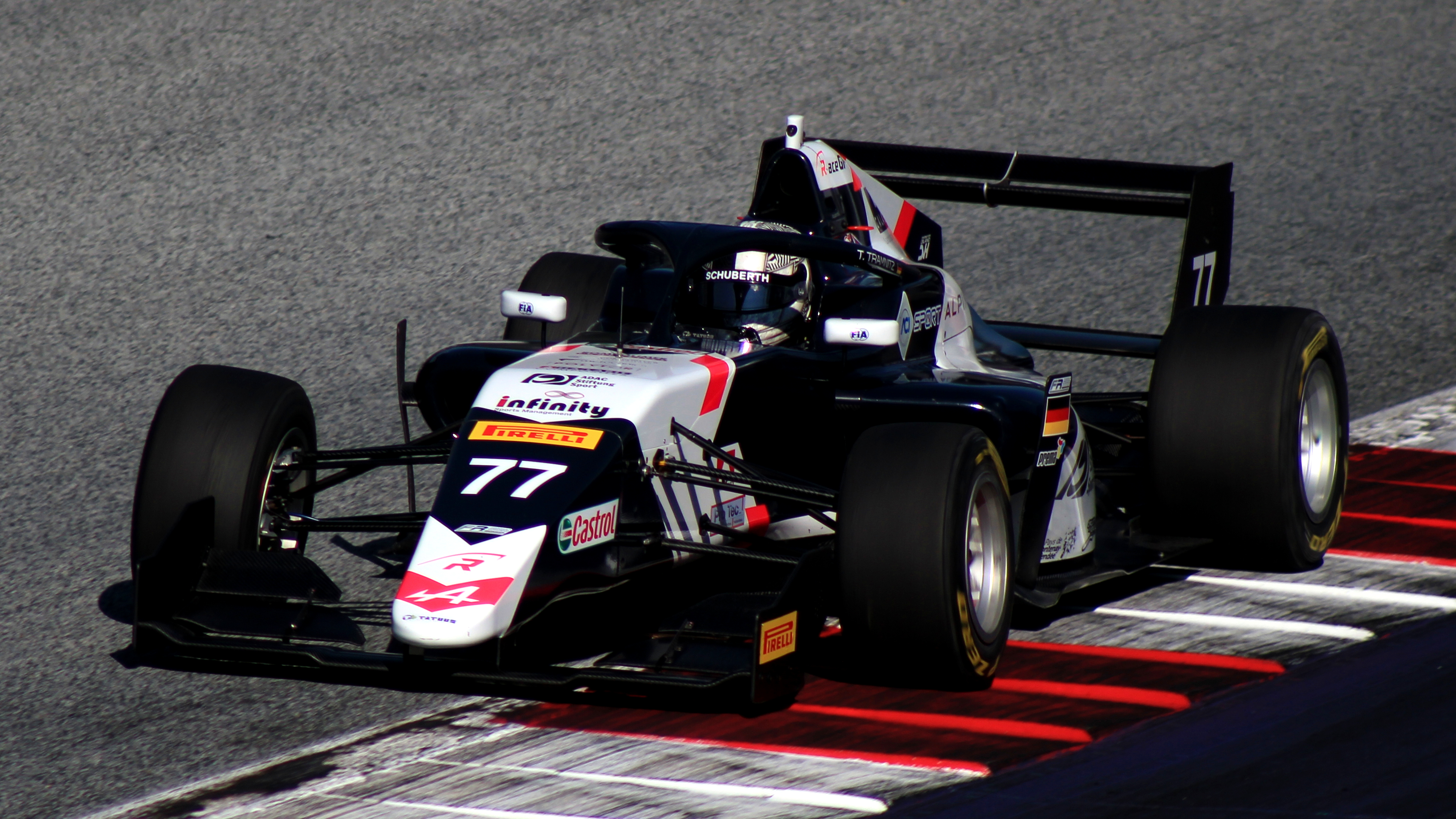
Tramnitz racing in the 2023 Formula Regional European Championship at the Red Bull Ring.

For his main campaign, Tramnitz moved over to R-ace GP in the Formula Regional European Championship. He scored his first pole in the series in the opening Imola round, but retired after a collision with teammate Martinius Stenshorne. A clean sweep followed in Barcelona where he took his first wins in the category. In Spa-Francorchamps, Tramnitz lost control at Kemmel-Radillon and crashed, causing a chain reaction multi-car collision of several following cars. One of the drivers involved, Dilano van 't Hoff, was killed in the incident. A string of podiums followed in the next four rounds where he took a third place from each of the rounds he raced in. He rounded out the season with his third win in the first race of the Hockenheim round, and followed it up with second place the next day. With three wins and ten podiums, Tramnitz finished third in the championship with 239 points.

=== Euroformula Open ===
Tramnitz joined the CryptoTower Racing Team for the opening round of the 2023 Euroformula Open Championship in Portimão. He stood on the podiums in all three races, taking two second places and one third place finish.

=== FIA Formula 3 Championship ===
==== 2024 ====
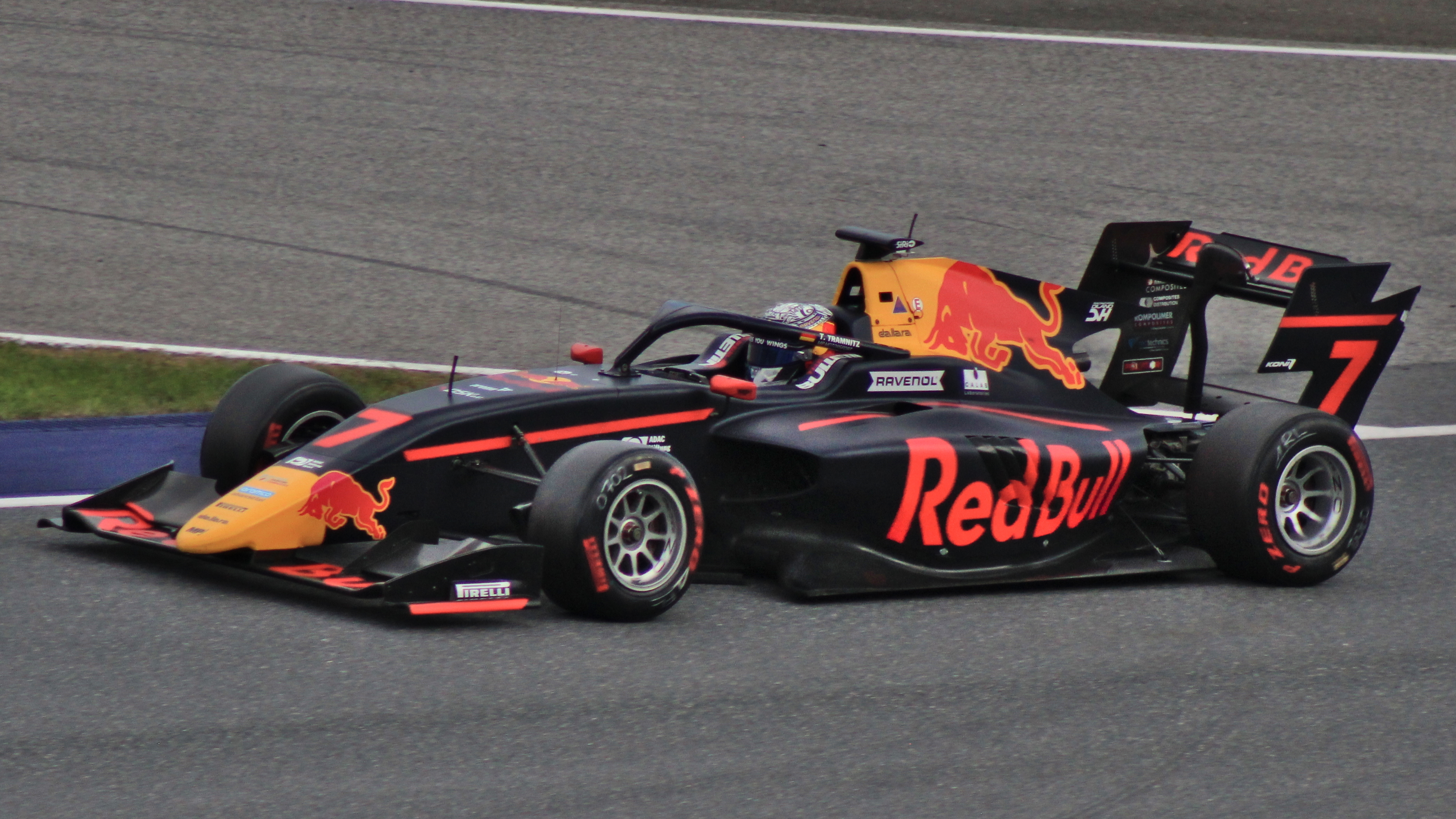
Tramnitz driving the Dallara F3 2019 during the 2024 Spielberg Formula 3 round

Tramnitz partook in the 2023 Formula 3 post-testing sessions with MP Motorsport. In January 2024, he was confirmed to join the Dutch outfit for the 2024 FIA Formula 3 season. He began his season positively in Bahrain, as following a fifth place finish in the sprint race, Tramnitz made up positions in the feature race from sixth to take third place — his first podium in the category. However, he had a disappointing round in Melbourne, as he qualified down in 22nd, which limited opportunities to progress up the field. In Imola, Tramnitz qualified tenth, and secured another podium in the sprint race having been in podium contention throughout the race. In the feature race, he narrowly missed out on points as he finished in 11th place. His positive momentum continued in the Monaco sprint race, as he finished in second place once again after gaining a position on Laurens van Hoepen at the first corner. In the feature race, he improved two positions to finish in eighth place. A difficult weekend followed in Barcelona, as Tramnitz could only rescue a point during the sprint race.

Tramnitz achieved his best qualifying in Austria, securing third on the grid. After taking eighth place in the sprint race, Tramnitz had a messy feature race compounded by a slow start, before a ten-second penalty for contact dropped him out of the points. A scoreless weekend followed in Silverstone, where he collided with Luke Browning in the sprint race while he was left on the wrong strategy during mixed conditions in the feature race. He returned to the points during the Hungarian sprint race after multiple attacks from Christian Mansell, but a clutch issue during the formation lap destroyed any chances of a double points finish that weekend. Tramnitz was set to return to the rostrum during the Spa-Francorchamps sprint race, but he was passed by Noel León on the final lap having held third for much of the race. In the feature race, he finished in ninth, where he started. Qualifying on reverse pole in Monza, Tramnitz would proceed to take his first F3 win in the sprint race, as he led every lap from start to finish amidst chaos behind. He concluded the season with sixth place in the feature race. Tramnitz finished the season ninth in the drivers' standings, scoring 81 points, one win and four podiums.

==== 2025 ====
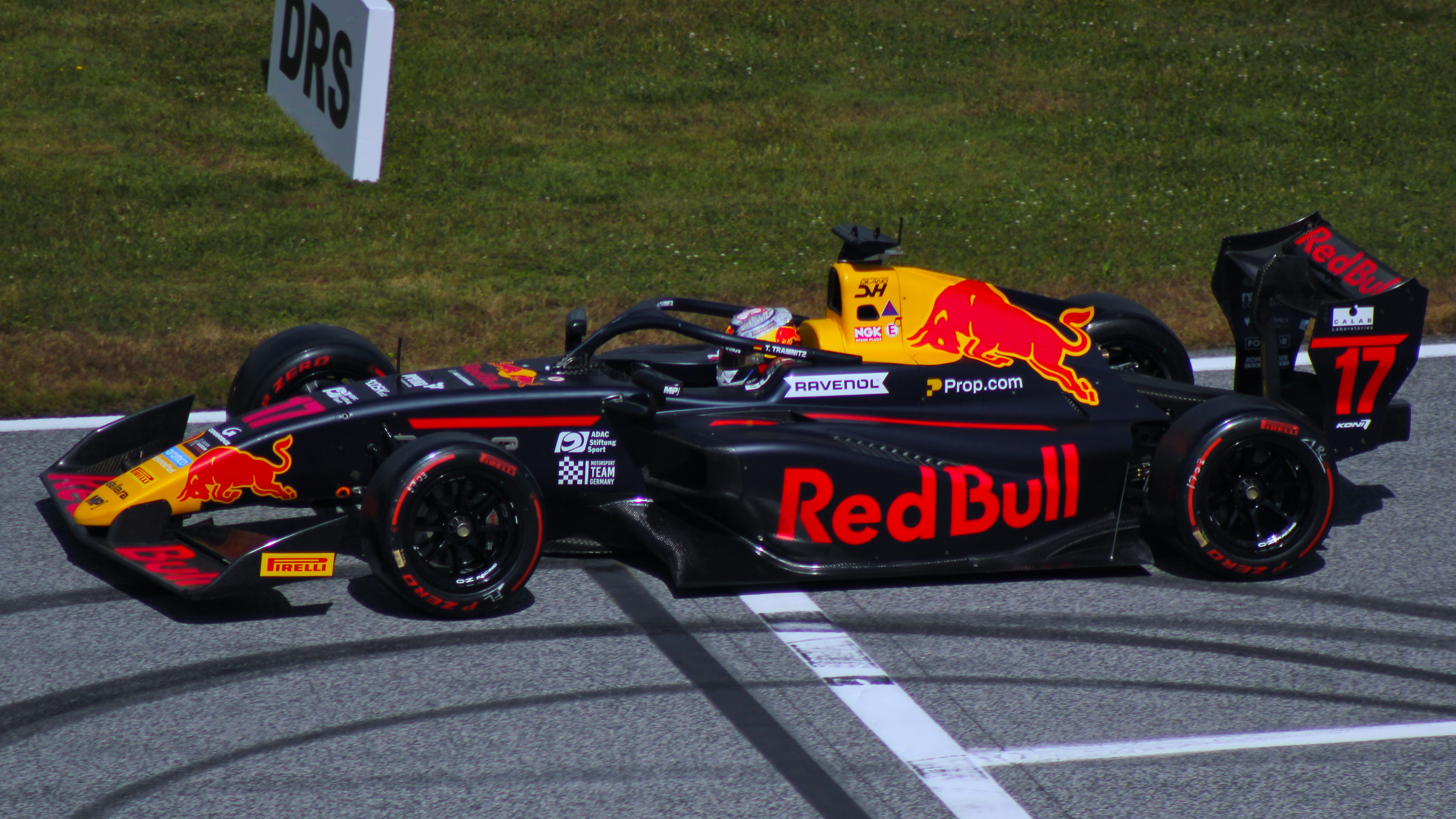
Tramnitz driving the Dallara F3 2025 during the 2025 Spielberg Formula 3 round

Tramnitz would remain with MP Motorsport for the 2025 FIA Formula 3 season. Tramnitz's season begain slowly in Melbourne where an electric issue in the sprint race left him a few laps down, but redeemed himself in the feature race by taking fifth place. After qualifying just outside the top-twelve in Bahrain, Tramnitz set on recovery drives during the races, improving to sixth in the sprint before nabbing a third-place podium during the feature race. Tramnitz followed it up with his first win of the season during the Imola sprint race, where he outduelled his teammate Bruno del Pino to take MP Motorsport's first 1-2 finish in the series. He made a strong recovery drive in the feature race, improving five places to finish in sixth place. His points streak continued in Monaco with a double fifth place in the Principality, but this was interrupted during the Barcelona sprint race following a lap 1 collision with Martinius Stenshorne and Roman Biliński which broke his suspension. Despite a three-place grid penalty for being at fault of the collision, he charged forward, eventually finishing the feature race in seventh.

Tramnitz qualified down in 17th for Austria, but made an excellent late charge in the sprint race, moving forward to finish in sixth place. He improved even further in the feature race, making up fifteen positions to finish on the podium in second place. However, this was followed by a run of three consecutive non-scoring rounds, compounded by a wrong tyre choice during the Silverstone feature race and another difficult qualifying in Budapest. In the Monza sprint race, Tramnitz tussled with his rivals for the lead and eventually emerged victorious for his second triumph of the season, but was stripped of it after failing to engage the start setup procedure. He concluded the season with tenth in the feature race, meaning he finished fourth in the standings with 93 points, one win and three podiums.

==== 2026 ====
During pre-season testing in Barcelona, Tramnitz deputised for an injured Michael Shin at Hitech TGR.

=== FIA Formula 2 Championship ===
Tramnitz was due to step up to Formula 2 in 2026 with MP Motorsport, however, financial reasons prevent the move up, and Gabriele Minì was selected instead to partner Oliver Goethe.

=== Formula E ===
In April 2023, Tramnitz was invited to the Formula E Berlin young drivers' test with ABT Cupra. The following year, Tramnitz would again drive for ABT Cupra during the Misano rookie free practice session and the Berlin rookie test.

=== Formula One ===
In October 2023, Tramnitz announced he had joined the Red Bull Junior Team. After failing to secure a seat in Formula 2 for 2026, he was dropped by Red Bull at the end of 2025.

=== Sportscar racing ===
In February 2026, Tramnitz was announced as a factory driver for BMW M Motorsport, following a successful test in the BMW M4 GT3 Evo.

== Personal life ==
Tramnitz was born and grew up in Hamburg, Germany. Growing up, he labels four-time Formula One World Champion Sebastian Vettel as his racing hero.

== Karting record ==
=== Karting career summary ===
| Season | Series | Team | Position |
|---|---|---|---|
| 2012 | ADAC Hansa-Jugend-Kart-Slalom Pokal | | 2nd |
| 2013 | Hamburger Kart-Slalom Landesmeisterschaft | | 1st |
| 2013 | Deutsche Kart-Meisterschaft — DMSJ | | 4th |
| 2013 | ADAC Hansa-Jugend-Kart-Slalom Pokal | | 1st |
| 2014 | Rotax Max Challenge Germany — Mini Max | | 7th |
| 2014 | Norddeutsche Kart-Challenge — Rotax Mini Max | | 1st |
| 2015 | Rotax Max Challenge Germany — Mini Max | | 2nd |
| 2015 | Europafinale — Rotax Mini Max | | 4th |
| 2015 | Rhein-Main-Kart-Cup — Rotax Mini Max | | 1st |
| 2016 | Rotax Max Challenge Germany — Junior | | 15th |
| 2016 | ADAC Kart Masters — X30 Junior | | 6th |
| 2017 | South Garda Winter Cup — OKJ | | 22nd |
| 2017 | ADAC Kart Masters — OKJ | | 9th |
| 2017 | ADAC Kart Academy — OKJ | | 1st |
| 2017 | German Karting Championship — Junior | | 21st |
| 2018 | German Karting Championship — Senior | Schumacher Racing Team | 8th |
| 2018 | WSK Final Cup — OK | Schumacher Racing Team | NC |
| 2019 | WSK Super Master Series — OK | Kartshop Ampfing | 58th |
| 2019 | German Karting Championship — Senior | Solgat Motorsport | 27th |

== Racing record ==
=== Racing career summary ===
| Season | Series | Team | Races | Wins | Poles | F/Laps | Podiums | Points | Position |
|---|---|---|---|---|---|---|---|---|---|
| 2020 | ADAC Formula 4 Championship | US Racing | 21 | 1 | 0 | 0 | 6 | 226 | 4th |
| 2020 | Italian F4 Championship | US Racing | 2 | 0 | 0 | 0 | 0 | 4 | 24th |
| 2021 | ADAC Formula 4 Championship | US Racing | 18 | 5 | 5 | 2 | 9 | 269 | **2nd** |
| 2021 | Italian F4 Championship | US Racing | 15 | 4 | 2 | 2 | 9 | 232 | **2nd** |
| 2022 | Formula Regional European Championship | Trident | 20 | 0 | 0 | 0 | 0 | 34 | 15th |
| 2022–23 | Formula E | ABT CUPRA Formula E Team | Test driver | | | | | | |
| 2023 | Formula Regional Middle East Championship | R-ace GP | 6 | 0 | 0 | 0 | 0 | 14 | 20th |
| 2023 | Formula Regional European Championship | R-ace GP | 20 | 3 | 4 | 1 | 10 | 239 | **3rd** |
| 2023 | Euroformula Open Championship | CryptoTower Racing Team | 3 | 0 | 0 | 2 | 3 | 55 | 12th |
| 2023 | TTE Endurance Proto - CN | Revolution Race Cars | 1 | 0 | 0 | 0 | 0 | 90 | 11th |
| 2023–24 | Formula E | ABT CUPRA Formula E Team | Test driver | | | | | | |
| 2024 | FIA Formula 3 Championship | MP Motorsport | 20 | 1 | 0 | 0 | 4 | 81 | 9th |
| 2025 | FIA Formula 3 Championship | MP Motorsport | 19 | 1 | 0 | 0 | 3 | 94 | 4th |
| 2026 | GT World Challenge Europe Endurance Cup | ROWE Racing | 5 | 0 | 0 | 0 | 0 | 3 | 25th |
| 2026 | GT World Challenge Europe Endurance Cup - Gold Cup | ROWE Racing | 5 | 1 | 0 | 0 | 4 | 107 | **1st** |
| 2026 | Nürburgring Langstrecken-Serie - BMW M240i | Adrenalin Motorsport Team Mainhattan Wheels | | | | | | | |
| 2026 | Nürburgring Langstrecken-Serie - SP9 | Schubert Motorsport | | | | | | | |
| 2026 | GT World Challenge Asia | Team KRC | 2 | 0 | 0 | 0 | 0 | 16 | 28th |

* Season still in progress.

=== Complete Italian F4 Championship results ===
(key) (Races in bold indicate pole position) (Races in italics indicate fastest lap)

| Year | Team | 1 | 2 | 3 | 4 | 5 | 6 | 7 | 8 | 9 | 10 | 11 | 12 | 13 | 14 | 15 | 16 | 17 | 18 | 19 | 20 | 21 | DC | Points |
|---|---|---|---|---|---|---|---|---|---|---|---|---|---|---|---|---|---|---|---|---|---|---|---|---|
| 2020 | US Racing | MIS; 1 | MIS; 2 | MIS; 3 | IMO1; 1 | IMO1; 2 | IMO1; 3 | RBR; 1 | RBR; 2 | RBR; 3 | MUG; 1 | MUG; 2 | MUG; 3 | MNZ; 1 | MNZ; 2 | MNZ; 3 | IMO2; 1 | IMO2; 2 | IMO2; 3 | VLL; 1; 12 | VLL; 2 C | VLL; 3; 8 | 24th | 4 |
| 2021 | US Racing | LEC; 1; 2 | LEC; 2; 1 | **LEC**; **3**; 1 | MIS; 1 | MIS; 2 | MIS; 3 | VLL; 1; 3 | VLL; 2; 2 | VLL; 3; 3 | IMO; 1 | IMO; 2 | IMO; 3 | RBR; 1; 2 | RBR; 2; 1 | **RBR**; **3**; 1 | MUG; 1; 7 | MUG; 2; 5 | MUG; 3; 9 | MNZ; 1; 4 | MNZ; 2; 6 | MNZ; 3; 5 | 2nd | 232 |

=== Complete ADAC Formula 4 Championship results ===
(key) (Races in bold indicate pole position) (Races in italics indicate fastest lap)

| Year | Team | 1 | 2 | 3 | 4 | 5 | 6 | 7 | 8 | 9 | 10 | 11 | 12 | 13 | 14 | 15 | 16 | 17 | 18 | 19 | 20 | 21 | DC | Points |
|---|---|---|---|---|---|---|---|---|---|---|---|---|---|---|---|---|---|---|---|---|---|---|---|---|
| 2020 | US Racing | LAU1; 1; 5 | LAU1; 2; 3 | LAU1; 3; 5 | NÜR1; 1; 7 | NÜR1; 2; 5 | NÜR1; 3; 6 | HOC; 1; 6 | HOC; 2; 2 | HOC; 3; 7 | NÜR2; 1; 4 | NÜR2; 2; 5 | NÜR2; 3; 2 | RBR; 1; 5 | RBR; 2; 11 | RBR; 3; 5 | LAU2; 1 (9) | LAU2; 2; 2 | LAU2; 3; 2 | OSC; 1; 5 | OSC; 2; 8 | OSC; 3; 1 | 4th | 226 |
| 2021 | US Racing | RBR; 1; 4 | **RBR**; **2**; 2 | RBR; 3 (15†) | ZAN; 1; 3 | ZAN; 2; 6 | ZAN; 3; 3 | HOC1; 1; 4 | **HOC1**; **2**; 1 | HOC1; 3; 4 | **SAC**; **1**; 1 | **SAC**; **2**; 1 | SAC; 3; 4 | HOC2; 1; 2 | HOC2; 2; 1 | HOC2; 3; 5 | **NÜR**; **1**; 1 | NÜR; 2; 4 | NÜR; 3; 11 | | | | 2nd | 269 |

=== Complete Formula Regional European Championship results ===
(key) (Races in bold indicate pole position) (Races in italics indicate fastest lap)

| Year | Team | 1 | 2 | 3 | 4 | 5 | 6 | 7 | 8 | 9 | 10 | 11 | 12 | 13 | 14 | 15 | 16 | 17 | 18 | 19 | 20 | DC | Points |
|---|---|---|---|---|---|---|---|---|---|---|---|---|---|---|---|---|---|---|---|---|---|---|---|
| 2022 | Trident | MNZ; 1; 11 | MNZ; 2; 12 | IMO; 1; 9 | IMO; 2; 7 | MCO; 1; 16 | MCO; 2 Ret | LEC; 1; 10 | LEC; 2; 10 | ZAN; 1 Ret | ZAN; 2 Ret | HUN; 1 Ret | HUN; 2; 4 | SPA; 1; 8 | SPA; 2; 7 | RBR; 1; 33† | RBR; 2; 9 | CAT; 1; 22 | CAT; 2; 13 | MUG; 1; 11 | MUG; 2; 14 | 15th | 34 |
| 2023 | R-ace GP | IMO; 1; 6 | **IMO**; **2** Ret | CAT; 1; 1 | **CAT**; **2**; 1 | HUN; 1; 8 | HUN; 2; 16 | SPA; 1; 2 | **SPA**; **2**; 2 | MUG; 1; 3 | MUG; 2; 7 | LEC; 1; 4 | LEC; 2; 3 | RBR; 1; 3 | RBR; 2; 12 | MNZ; 1 Ret | MNZ; 2; 3 | ZAN; 1; 6 | ZAN; 2; 4 | HOC; 1; 1 | **HOC**; **2**; 2 | 3rd | 239 |

=== Complete Formula Regional Middle East Championship results ===
(key) (Races in bold indicate pole position) (Races in italics indicate fastest lap)

| Year | Team | 1 | 2 | 3 | 4 | 5 | 6 | 7 | 8 | 9 | 10 | 11 | 12 | 13 | 14 | 15 | DC | Points |
|---|---|---|---|---|---|---|---|---|---|---|---|---|---|---|---|---|---|---|
| 2023 | R-ace GP | DUB1; 1 | DUB1; 2 | DUB1; 3 | KUW1; 1 | KUW1; 2 | KUW1; 3 | KUW2; 1 | KUW2; 2 | KUW2; 3 | DUB2; 1; 7 | DUB2; 2; 7 | DUB2; 3; 9 | ABU; 1; 21 | ABU; 2; 24 | ABU; 3 Ret | 20th | 14 |

=== Complete Euroformula Open Championship results ===
(key) (Races in bold indicate pole position) (Races in italics indicate fastest lap)

| Year | Team | 1 | 2 | 3 | 4 | 5 | 6 | 7 | 8 | 9 | 10 | 11 | 12 | 13 | 14 | 15 | 16 | 17 | 18 | 19 | 20 | 21 | DC | Points |
|---|---|---|---|---|---|---|---|---|---|---|---|---|---|---|---|---|---|---|---|---|---|---|---|---|
| 2023 | CryptoTower Racing Team | EST; 1; 2 | EST; 2; 3 | EST; 3; 2 | SPA; 1 | SPA; 2 | SPA; 3 | HUN; 1 | HUN; 2 | HUN; 3 | LEC; 1 | LEC; 2 | LEC; 3 | RBR; 1 | RBR; 2 | RBR; 3 | MNZ; 1 | MNZ; 2 | MNZ; 3 | CAT; 1 | CAT; 2 | CAT; 3 | 12th | 55 |

=== Complete FIA Formula 3 Championship results ===
(key) (Races in bold indicate pole position) (Races in italics indicate fastest lap)

| Year | Entrant | 1 | 2 | 3 | 4 | 5 | 6 | 7 | 8 | 9 | 10 | 11 | 12 | 13 | 14 | 15 | 16 | 17 | 18 | 19 | 20 | DC | Points |
|---|---|---|---|---|---|---|---|---|---|---|---|---|---|---|---|---|---|---|---|---|---|---|---|
| 2024 | MP Motorsport | BHR; SPR; 5 | BHR; FEA; 3 | MEL; SPR; 12 | MEL; FEA; 15 | IMO; SPR; 2 | IMO; FEA; 11 | MON; SPR; 2 | MON; FEA; 8 | CAT; SPR; 10 | CAT; FEA; 11 | RBR; SPR; 8 | RBR; FEA; 15 | SIL; SPR; 25 | SIL; FEA; 14 | HUN; SPR; 4 | HUN; FEA; 20 | SPA; SPR; 4 | SPA; FEA; 9 | MNZ; SPR; 1 | MNZ; FEA; 6 | 9th | 81 |
| 2025 | MP Motorsport | MEL; SPR; NC | MEL; FEA; 5 | BHR; SPR; 6 | BHR; FEA; 3 | IMO; SPR; 1 | IMO; FEA; 6 | MON; SPR; 5 | MON; FEA; 5 | CAT; SPR; Ret | CAT; FEA; 7 | RBR; SPR; 6 | RBR; FEA; 2 | SIL; SPR; 11 | SIL; FEA; 18 | SPA; SPR; 12 | SPA; FEA; C | HUN; SPR; 13 | HUN; FEA; 13 | MNZ; SPR; 18 | MNZ; FEA; 10 | 4th | 94 |

=== Complete GT World Challenge Europe results ===
==== GT World Challenge Europe Endurance Cup ====
(key) (Races in bold indicate pole position) (Races in italics indicate fastest lap)

| Year | Team | Car | Class | 1 | 2 | 3 | 4 | 5 | 6 | 7 | Pos. | Points |
|---|---|---|---|---|---|---|---|---|---|---|---|---|
| 2026 | ROWE Racing | BMW M4 GT3 Evo | Gold | LEC; 10 | MNZ; 23 | SPA; 6H; 8 | SPA; 12H; 10 | SPA; 24H; 11 | NÜR; 17 | ALG; 7 | 1st | 107 |
