= Max Esterson =

American racing driver (born 2002)

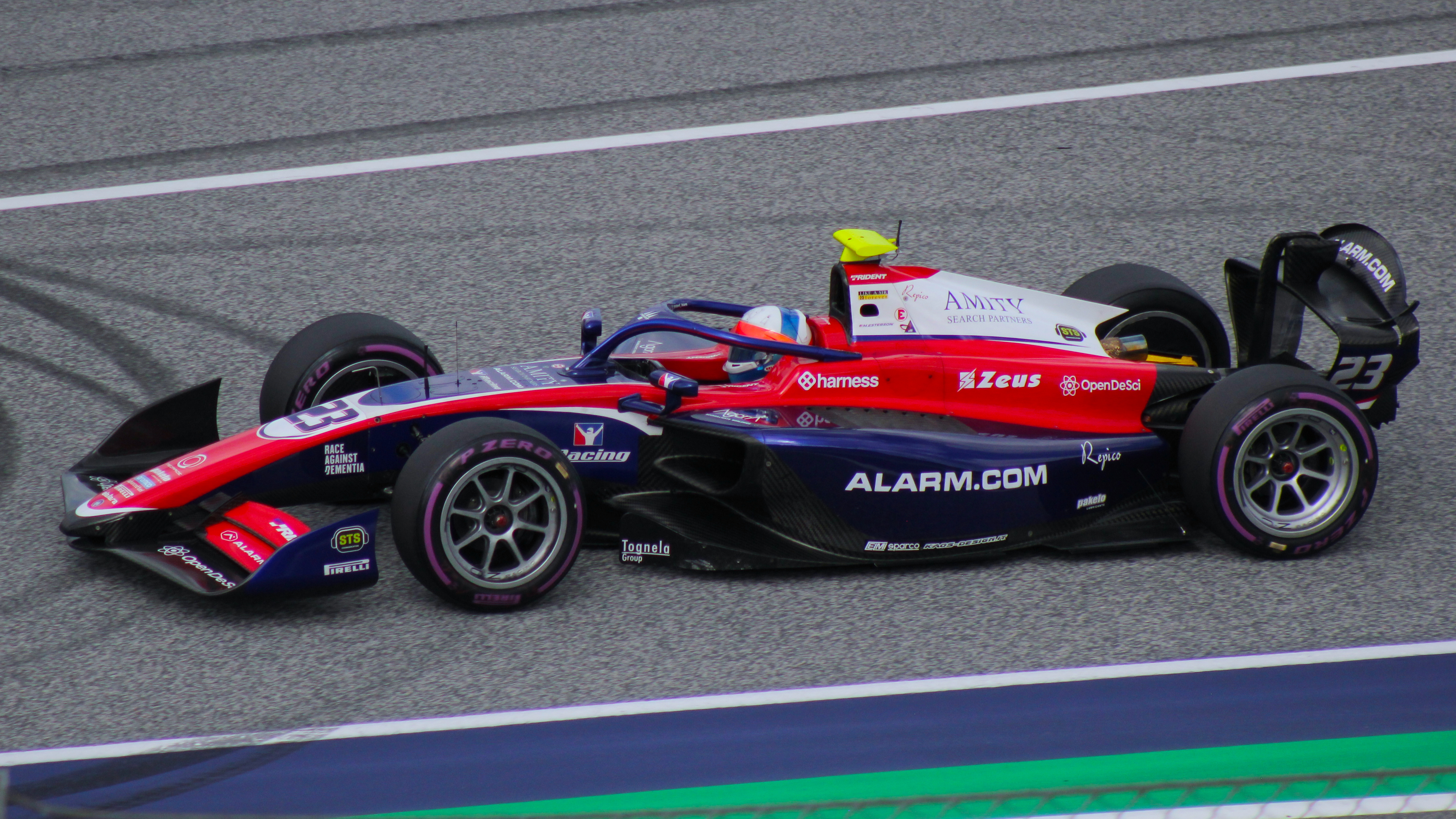
- Esterson driving the Dallara F2 2024 during the 2025 Spielberg Formula 2 round
- Nationality: American
- Born: Maxwell Esterson; October 9, 2002 (age 24) New York City, U.S.

IMSA SportsCar Championship career
- Debut season: 2026
- Current team: RLL Team McLaren
- Categorisation: FIA Silver
- Car number: 59
- Former teams: JDC–Miller MotorSports
- Starts: 11
- Wins: 0
- Podiums: 0
- Poles: 0
- Fastest laps: 0
- Best finish: 9th in 2026

Previous series
- 2024–2025 2023–2024 2022–2023 2021 2020 2020: FIA Formula 2 FIA Formula 3 GB3; National Formula Ford; F2000 Championship Series; F1600 Championship Series

Maxwell Esterson (born October 9, 2002) is an American racing driver and esports driver who competes in the IMSA SportsCar Championship for RLL Team McLaren. He previously competed in the FIA Formula 2 Championship for Trident and in the FIA Formula 3 Championship with Jenzer Motorsport.

== Single-seater career ==
=== Sim racing ===
Esterson started his sim racing career on iRacing at the age of eleven. He then went on to become one of the top sim-racers in the world, including finishing in seventh place in the 2019 VRS Pro GT Championship. This string of results quickly showed as he was ranked within the top-35 road course drivers in the world and top-four in the US on the iRacing program. In 2020, he became champion of the Formula Race Promotions iRacing Challenge. He followed this by winning the 2021 Road to Indy TireRack.com eSeries. During the COVID-19 pandemic, Esterson tutored multiple drivers on iRacing, including Scott Dixon and Richard Westbrook.

=== Karting ===
Esterson started karting when he was almost 16. In 2019, he contested his first partial season in karting at Oakland Valley Race Park, competing with McAleer Racing.

=== Formula Ford ===
==== 2020 ====
Esterson made his single-seater racing debut in 2020, competing in the F1600 Championship Series with Team Pelfrey. He took one victory and finished the season in fifth. He also contested a single race in the F2000 Championship Series at Pittsburgh International Race Complex, which he won, setting at the time the track-record. At the end of the year, Esterson made his debut at two of the world's biggest races, the Formula Ford Festival and the Walter Hayes Trophy. Running with Low-Dempsey Racing, Esterson qualified second in his heat at the Formula Ford Festival, and finished sixth in the Grand Final.

==== 2021 ====
In 2021, Esterson competed in the BRSCC Avon Tyres National Formula Ford Championship for Low Dempsey Racing, where he scored two wins and finished third in the Championship. He then went on to finish second in the 50th Anniversary BRSCC Formula Ford Festival and won the 2021 Walter Hayes Trophy as part of the Team USA Scholarship.

==== 2022 ====
Esterson returned to the Formula Ford Festival and Walter Hayes Trophy with Ammonite Motorsport in 2022. At the Formula Ford Festival, he took pole by 0.8sec, won his heat, won his semifinal and was on pole for the final. Esterson led every lap of the Final and was then awarded victory as the race was shortened due to torrential weather conditions. In the Walter Hayes Trophy, Esterson again qualified on pole, won his heat race, won his semifinal and led every lap of the Grand Final for the second year in a row, finishing first but he was then dropped to fifth after a controversial ruling handed him a 4.5-second penalty for a collision with another driver.

=== GB3 Championship ===
==== 2022 ====
In 2022, Esterson progressed to the GB3 Championship, partnering Tommy Smith and Marcos Flack at Douglas Motorsport. He started out by taking his first top ten finish in Race 3 at the season opener in Oulton Park, before scoring a pair of fourth places at Silverstone. The third round of the season at Donington Park would prove to be his most successful one, as Esterson achieved his maiden podium in the first race, before winning Race 2 from pole position, thus securing his first win in slicks-and-wings machinery. He finished the season in seventh.

==== 2023 ====
In 2023, Esterson joined Fortec Motorsports in the GB3 Championship. The season started with a series of misfortune, with a multitude of mechanical failures and difficult conditions leading to disappointing finishes in regard to his pace. His qualifying was hampered by a red flag at Spa, followed by a technical failure in race two after a strong drive to fourth. He would again make a strong drive in the reverse grid race, setting the fastest lap of the race and making up twelve places in six laps, only to be taken out at Les Combes. An electrical failure at Snetterton during qualifying meant that he started at the back of the grid for all three races. His woes were exacerbated in the second Silverstone round, where he had two engine failures during free practice, and an underpowered engine for qualifying, despite this, he was able to recover well across the weekend, recovering to tenth and ninth in the first and second races respectively, from 18th on the grid. At the last race in Donington Park, Esterson would score his only podium with a third place in race two. Esterson finished the season in 11th, four places lower than the previous year.

=== FIA Formula 3 ===
At the end of 2022, Esterson took part in the post-season test of the FIA Formula 3 Championship with Van Amersfoort Racing.

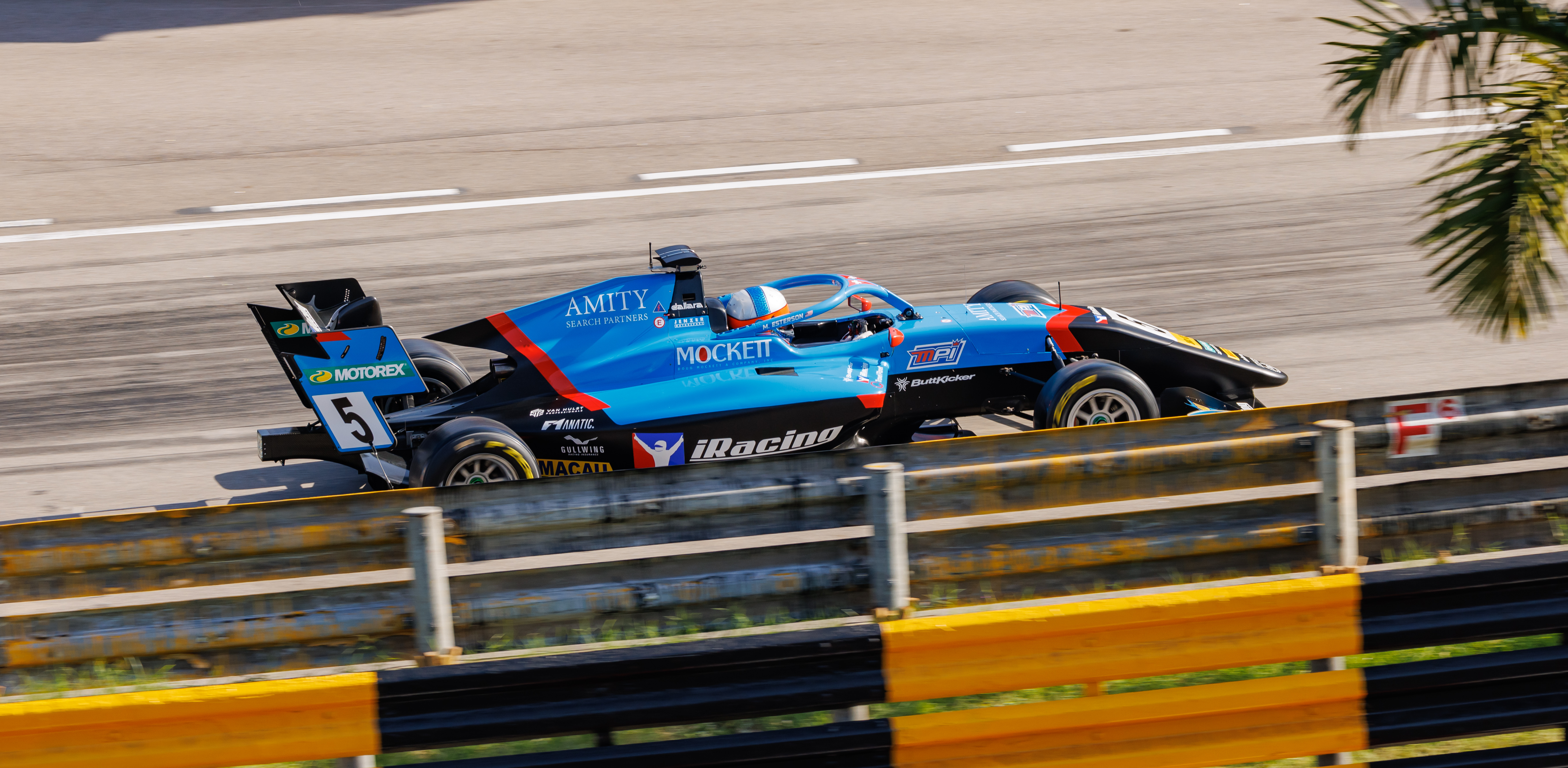
Esterson driving the Dallara F3 2019 during the 2023 Macau Grand Prix

==== 2023 ====
In 2023, Esterson joined Rodin Carlin in the FIA Formula 3 Championship ahead of the round at Silverstone, replacing Hunter Yeany for both that round and Budapest. Esterson finished a highest finish of 18th place in Budapest. He returned to his GB3 duties following that, and was replaced in his seat by Euroformula Open racer Francesco Simonazzi for the final two rounds. He was classified 35th, albeit last in the standings. For the post-season tests, Esterson was fielded in by Jenzer Motorsport. Esterson also partook in the Macau Grand Prix with Jenzer.

==== 2024 ====
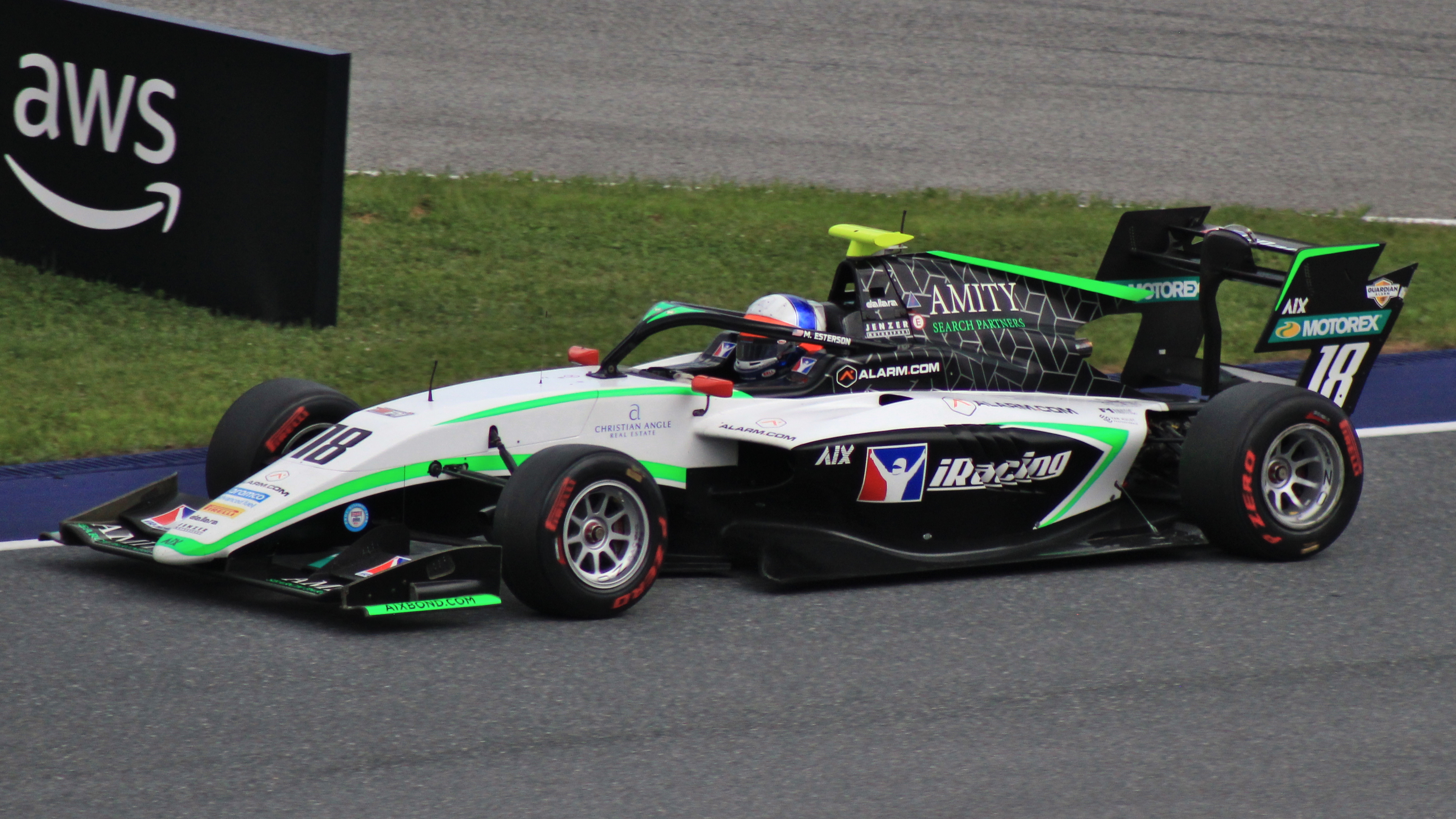
Esterson driving the Dallara F3 2019 during the 2024 Spielberg Formula 3 round

In 2024, Esterson joined FIA Formula 3 on a full-time basis, teaming up with Jenzer Motorsport. During the Sakhir Formula 3 Sprint Race, he qualified an impressive tenth, and was able to stay in the top-ten throughout the whole race, holding off Gabriele Minì for sixth place. Esterson would only claim one more points finish in 2024, taking seventh in the Spa-Francorchamps feature race, but impressed at Silverstone by qualifying second during a wet-weather session. He finished 21st in the standings, highest of all Jenzer drivers.

=== FIA Formula 2 Championship ===
==== 2024 ====
At the end of 2024, Esterson was announced to make his Formula 2 debut with Trident for the final two rounds of the season, replacing Richard Verschoor who himself replaced the outgoing Dennis Hauger at MP Motorsport.

==== 2025 ====
Esterson continued with Trident for the 2025 Formula 2 season, alongside Sami Meguetounif. Having failed to score points throughout the campaign, Trident and Esterson, along with Meguetounif decided to part ways prior to the Baku round; being replaced by Formula 3 graduates Martinius Stenshorne and Laurens van Hoepen.

== Sportscar career ==
Following his Formula 2 exit, it was announced that Esterson would make his sportscar racing debut in the uppermost category of the IMSA SportsCar Championship, driving a Porsche 963 for JDC–Miller MotorSports at Petit Le Mans. Esterson stated that he considered this race a "test" owing to his lack of experience. He was later confirmed to make his debut in the GTD Pro class with RLL Team McLaren at the 2026 24 Hours of Daytona.

== Personal life ==
Esterson grew up in New York City going to the Allen-Stevenson School and attended Regis High School, graduating in 2021. His older brother, Hugh, is also a racing driver.

== Racing record ==
=== Career summary ===
Season	Series	Team	Races	Wins	Poles	F/Laps	Podiums	Points	Position
2020	F1600 Championship Series	Team Pelfrey	15	1	3	3	4	423	5th
2020	F2000 Championship Series	Ubs Financial Services	1	1	0	1	1	52	16th
2020	National FF1600 Championship	Low Dempsey Racing	3	0	0	0	0	0	NC
2020	Formula Ford Festival	Low Dempsey Racing	1	0	0	0	0	N/A	6th
2020	Walter Hayes Trophy	Low Dempsey Racing	1	0	0	0	0	N/A	14th
2021	National Formula Ford Championship	Low Dempsey Racing	20	2	1	4	13	414	**3rd**
2021	Formula Ford Festival	Low Dempsey Racing	1	0	0	0	1	N/A	**2nd**
2021	Walter Hayes Trophy	Low Dempsey Racing	1	1	1	0	1	N/A	**1st**
2022	GB3 Championship	Douglas Motorsport	24	1	1	2	3	292.5	7th
2022	Formula Ford Festival	Ammonite Motorsport	1	1	1	0	1	N/A	**1st**
2022	Walter Hayes Trophy	Ammonite Motorsport	1	0	0	0	0	N/A	5th
2023	GB3 Championship	Fortec Motorsports	23	0	0	1	1	215	11th
2023	FIA Formula 3 Championship	Rodin Carlin	4	0	0	0	0	0	35th
2023	Macau Grand Prix	Jenzer Motorsport	1	0	0	0	0	N/A	20th
2024	FIA Formula 3 Championship	Jenzer Motorsport	20	0	0	0	0	11	21st
2024	FIA Formula 2 Championship	Trident	4	0	0	0	0	0	31st
2025	FIA Formula 2 Championship	Trident	21	0	0	0	0	0	23rd
2025	IMSA SportsCar Championship - GTP	JDC–Miller MotorSports	1	0	0	0	0	209	41st
2026	IMSA SportsCar Championship - GTD Pro	RLL Team McLaren	10	0	0	1	0	2392	9th
2026	Nürburgring Langstrecken-Serie - BMW M2 Racing	SRS Team Sorg Rennsport	1	0	0	0	0	0	NC

* Season still in progress.

=== Complete GB3 Championship results ===
(key) (Races in bold indicate pole position) (Races in italics indicate fastest lap)

Year	Team	1	2	3	4	5	6	7	8	9	10	11	12	13	14	15	16	17	18	19	20	21	22	23	24	DC	Points
2022	Douglas Motorsport	OUL; 1; 19	OUL; 2; 11	OUL; 3; 8^{1}	SIL1; 1; 4	SIL1; 2; 4	SIL1; 3; 10^{5}	DON1; 1; 3	**DON1**; **2**; 1	DON1; 3; 11^{7}	SNE; 1; 10	SNE; 2; 10	SNE; 3; 7^{5}	SPA; 1; 4	SPA; 2; 3	SPA; 3; 17^{3}	SIL2; 1; 9	SIL2; 2; 10	SIL2; 3 Ret	BRH; 1; 10	BRH; 2; 18	BRH; 3 Ret	DON2; 1; 11	DON2; 2; 8	DON2; 3; 18	7th	292.5
2023	Fortec Motorsports	OUL; 1; 7	OUL; 2; 4	OUL; 3 Ret	SIL1; 1; 13	SIL1; 2; 8	SIL1; 3; 22	SPA; 1; 6	SPA; 2 Ret	SPA; 3; 21	SNE; 1; 20	SNE; 2; 16	SNE; 3; 16^{9}	SIL2; 1; 10	SIL2; 2; 9	SIL2; 3 C	BRH; 1; 11	BRH; 2; 11	BRH; 3 Ret	ZAN; 1; 13	ZAN; 2; 13	ZAN; 3; 9^{2}	DON; 1; 6	DON; 2; 3	DON; 3; 8^{9}	11th	215

=== Complete Macau Grand Prix results ===
Year	Team	Car	Qualifying	Quali Race	Main race
2023	(Switzerland) Jenzer Motorsport	Dallara F3 2019	21st	16th	20th

=== Complete FIA Formula 3 Championship results ===
(key) (Races in bold indicate pole position) (Races in italics indicate fastest lap)

Year	Entrant	1	2	3	4	5	6	7	8	9	10	11	12	13	14	15	16	17	18	19	20	DC	Points
2023	Rodin Carlin	BHR; SPR	BHR; FEA	MEL; SPR	MEL; FEA	MON; SPR	MON; FEA	CAT; SPR	CAT; FEA	RBR; SPR	RBR; FEA	SIL; SPR; 24	SIL; FEA; Ret	HUN; SPR; 18	HUN; FEA; 21	SPA; SPR	SPA; FEA	MNZ; SPR	MNZ; FEA			35th	0
2024	Jenzer Motorsport	BHR; SPR; 6	BHR; FEA; 24	MEL; SPR; 26	MEL; FEA; 14	IMO; SPR; 18	IMO; FEA; 21	MON; SPR; 14	MON; FEA; 17	CAT; SPR; 22	CAT; FEA; 23	RBR; SPR; 18	RBR; FEA; 17	SIL; SPR; Ret	SIL; FEA; 18	HUN; SPR; 16	HUN; FEA; 15	SPA; SPR; Ret	SPA; FEA; 7	MNZ; SPR; Ret	MNZ; FEA; Ret	21st	11

=== Complete FIA Formula 2 Championship results ===
(key) (Races in bold indicate pole position) (Races in italics indicate fastest lap)

Year	Entrant	1	2	3	4	5	6	7	8	9	10	11	12	13	14	15	16	17	18	19	20	21	22	23	24	25	26	27	28	DC	Points
2024	Trident	BHR; SPR	BHR; FEA	JED; SPR	JED; FEA	MEL; SPR	MEL; FEA	IMO; SPR	IMO; FEA	MON; SPR	MON; FEA	CAT; SPR	CAT; FEA	RBR; SPR	RBR; FEA	SIL; SPR	SIL; FEA	HUN; SPR	HUN; FEA	SPA; SPR	SPA; FEA	MNZ; SPR	MNZ; FEA	BAK; SPR	BAK; FEA	LSL; SPR; 14	LSL; FEA; 18	YMC; SPR; 14	YMC; FEA; 17	31st	0
2025	Trident	MEL; SPR; Ret	MEL; FEA; C	BHR; SPR; Ret	BHR; FEA; 21	JED; SPR; 18	JED; FEA; 18	IMO; SPR; 17	IMO; FEA; 19	MON; SPR; 13	MON; FEA; Ret	CAT; SPR; 19	CAT; FEA; 14	RBR; SPR; 10	RBR; FEA; 15	SIL; SPR; 21	SIL; FEA; 13	SPA; SPR; 14	SPA; FEA; 16	HUN; SPR; 19	HUN; FEA; 19	MNZ; SPR; Ret	MNZ; FEA; 15	BAK; SPR	BAK; FEA	LSL; SPR	LSL; FEA	YMC; SPR	YMC; FEA	23rd	0

=== Complete IMSA SportsCar Championship results ===
(key) (Races in bold indicate pole position; races in italics indicate fastest lap)

Year	Entrant	Class	Chassis	Engine	1	2	3	4	5	6	7	8	9	10	Rank	Points
2025	JDC–Miller MotorSports	GTP	Porsche 963	Porsche 9RD 4.6 L Turbo V8	DAY	SEB	LBH	LGA	DET	WGL	ELK	IMS	PET; 12		41st	209
2026	RLL Team McLaren	GTD Pro	McLaren 720S GT3 Evo	McLaren M840T 4.0 L Turbo V8	DAY; 12	SEB; 9	LGA; 7	DET; 8	WGL; 11	MOS; 6	ELK; 12	VIR; 8	IMS; 8	PET; 14	9th	2392
