= Sami Meguetounif =

French racing driver (born 2004)

- Meguetounif at Silverstone Circuit in 2026
- Nationality: French
- Born: 24 May 2004 (age 22) Marseille, Bouches-du-Rhône, France

European Le Mans Series career
- Debut season: 2026
- Current team: TDS Racing
- Categorisation: FIA Silver
- Car number: 14
- Starts: 6
- Wins: 1
- Podiums: 2
- Poles: 0
- Fastest laps: 1
- Best finish: 2nd in 2026 (LMP2 Pro-Am)

Previous series
- 2026; 2025–26; 2025; 2024; 2023; 2022; 2021–2023; 2021; 2021; 2019–2020; 2019: European Le Mans Series; Asian Le Mans Series; FIA Formula 2; FIA Formula 3; FR Middle East; FR Asian; FR European; ADAC F4; Italian F4; French F4; F4 South East Asia

Sami Meguetounif (French pronunciation: [sa.mi mɛ.ɡɥɛ.tu.nif]; born 24 May 2004) is a French racing driver who is set to compete in the LMP2 class of the IMSA SportsCar Championship with TDS Racing. He previously competed in the European Le Mans Series with TDS Racing. Meguetounif competed in the FIA Formula 2 Championship and the FIA Formula 3 Championship with Trident.

== Early racing career ==
=== Karting ===
Meguetounif started karting in his native France in 2013, racing in the Regional PACAC championship, which he would go on to finish second in. He won the same championship in the Minime class two years later, and soon made his debut in various national championships. Meguetounif moved into international competition in 2017, finishing fifth in the Karting Academy Trophy and getting second place in the Rotax Max Challenge Grand Finals, only losing out to Tijmen van der Helm. That year, Meguetounif also won two trophies in his homeland, one of them being the National Championship, beating future flatmate and Formula 4 rival Victor Bernier. In 2018, Meguetounif went on to improve to fourth in the Academy Trophy, and also made his first appearance in the European Championship. He finished his karting career in 2019, with 14th place at the World Championships.

=== Lower formulae ===
==== 2019 ====
Meguetounif made his car racing debut in the 2019 French F4 Championship, competing at the Circuit Paul Ricard, ending up in the top-ten in two out of three races. He also made a solitary appearance as a guest driver in the final round of the Formula 4 South East Asia Championship, where he finished second in all but one of his races.

==== 2020 ====
For 2020, Meguetounif decided to race in the French F4 Championship for a full season. He started the season out with only ten points from the first round, but would go on to improve rapidly, getting his first podium with a second-place finish in race 1 at Magny-Cours. After a disappointing round in Zandvoort, Meguetounif returned to the rostrum with third place in race 1 of round four. He followed that success up with his most successful round of the season, scoring both pole positions, two seconds and one third place at the Circuit de Spa-Francorchamps. He finished his season off strongly, achieving his only win of the season at Le Castellet, and scoring two further podiums in the final two rounds. In total, Meguetounif finished on the podium eight times and ended up fourth in the standings.

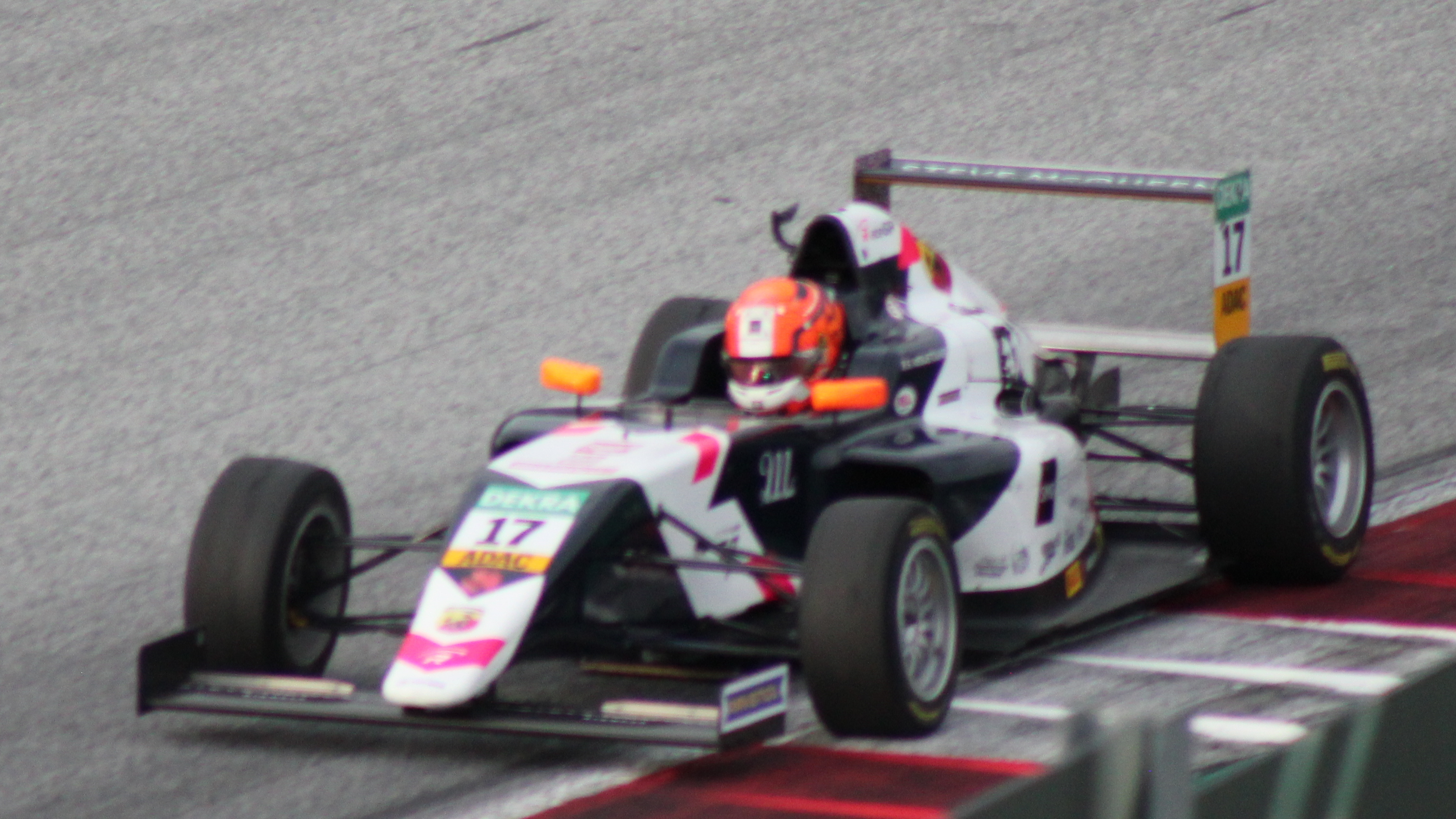
Meguetounif racing in the 2021 ADAC Formula 4 Championship at the Red Bull Ring.

==== 2021 ====
In 2021, Meguetounif joined R-ace GP to compete in the ADAC Formula 4 Championship on a full-time basis, whilst also racing in certain rounds of the Italian Championship.

=== Formula Regional Championship ===
==== 2021 ====
On 4 October 2021, it was announced that Meguetounif would start the final four races of the Formula Regional European Championship, remaining with R-ace. He finished his first two races at the Regional F3 level in 22nd and 20th at the Mugello Circuit. Meguetounif improved significantly in the final round, finishing close to the top-ten in both races.

==== 2022 ====
In February of the following year, Meguetounif took part in the final round of the Formula Regional Asian Championship with Evans GP, in preparation for his main campaign. Having finished 13th in his debut race, Meguetounif scored points in an incident-packed race 2. He ended up 20th in the standings.

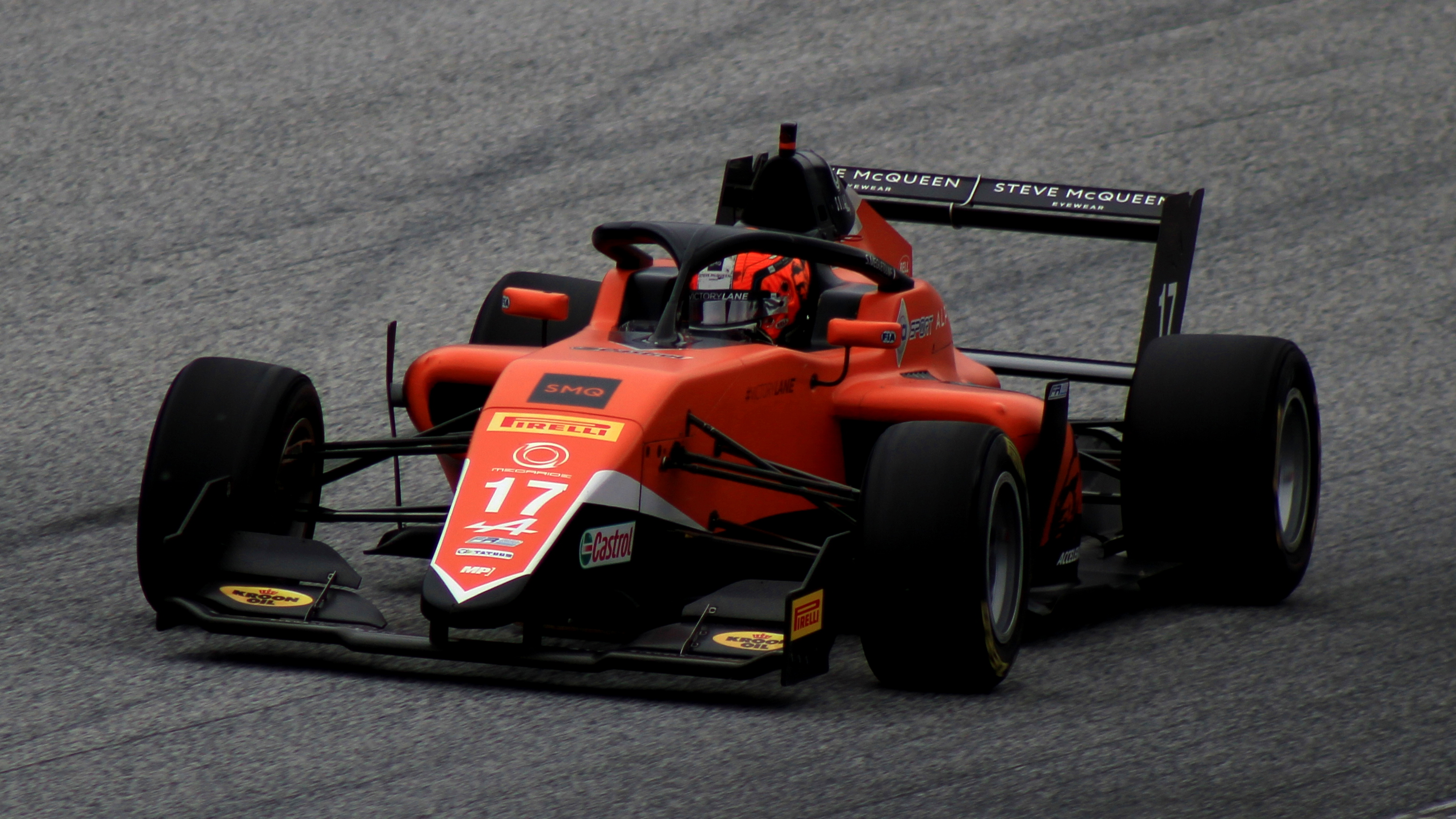
Meguetounif racing in the 2022 Formula Regional European Championship at the Red Bull Ring.

Meguetounif joined MP Motorsport for that year's Formula Regional European Championship, partnering Michael Belov and Dilano van 't Hoff. He scored his first points in the first race with a ninth-place finish, missing out on the rookie win to Sebastián Montoya by three tenths. At the second round of the season in Imola, Meguetounif experienced a hard crash after being pushed off the track. He recounts losing consciousness after colliding with the wall but was found to have no serious issues during subsequent check-ups. He took part in qualifying the day after, but withdrew from the race.

Meguetounif would score two more points finishes during the campaign, which included a second place in Belgium, leading him to end up 16th in the drivers' championship.

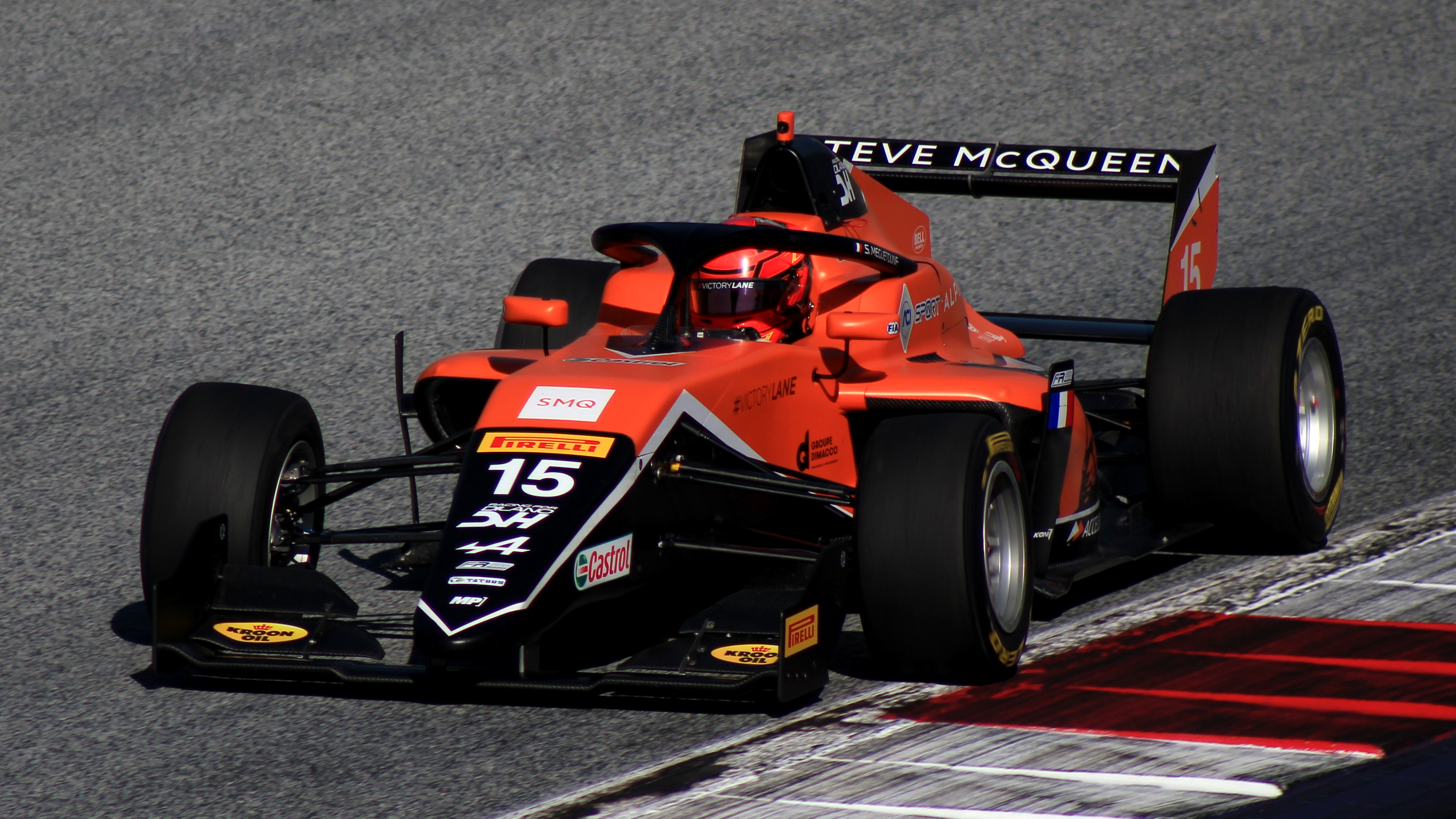
Meguetounif racing in the 2023 Formula Regional European Championship at the Red Bull Ring.

==== 2023 ====
Meguetounif competed the full season in the 2023 Formula Regional Middle East Championship with MP Motorsport.

For his main campaign, Meguetounif would remain with MP in FRECA, partnering Victor Bernier and Dilano van 't Hoff. A first podium of the year came soon, with Meguetounif finishing third in Barcelona. After a pair of points-scoring rounds, Meguetounif and the team would miss the round in Mugello out of respect for van 't Hoff, who had died in an accident at Spa. At the subsequent round in France, Meguetounif would finish second, and he would repeat that result during the next event at the Red Bull Ring, dedicating his result to van 't Hoff. However, this would end up being his final podium finish of the year, one he ended ninth overall, six places ahead of teammate Bernier.

=== FIA Formula 3 ===
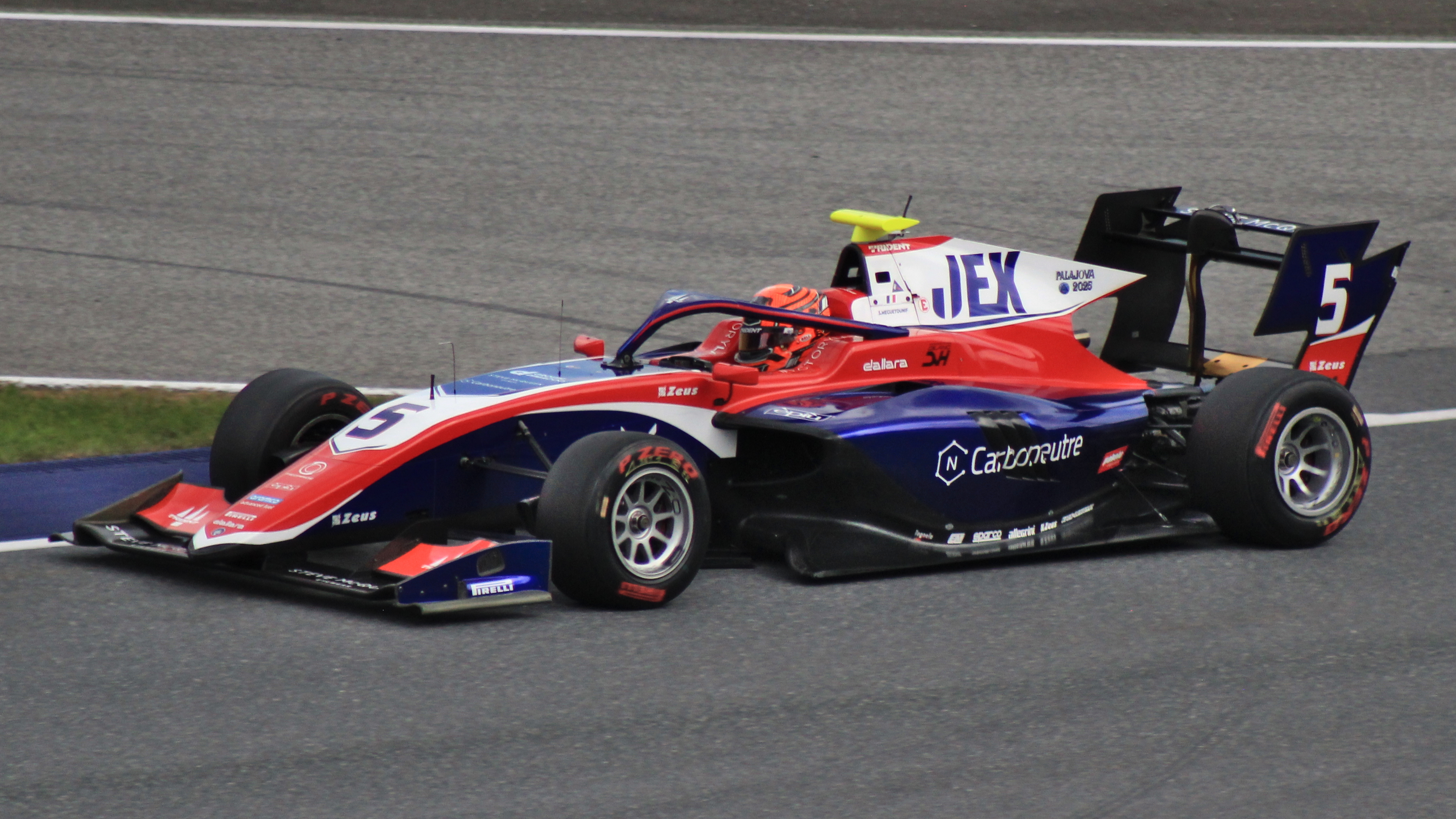
Meguetounif driving the Dallara F3 2019 during the 2024 Spielberg Formula 3 round

Having completed the post-season tests with Trident, Meguetounif would sign for the Italian team to compete in the 2024 season of the FIA Formula 3 Championship. Meguetounif took two wins and two podium finishes, ending the championship in eighth place.

=== FIA Formula 2 ===
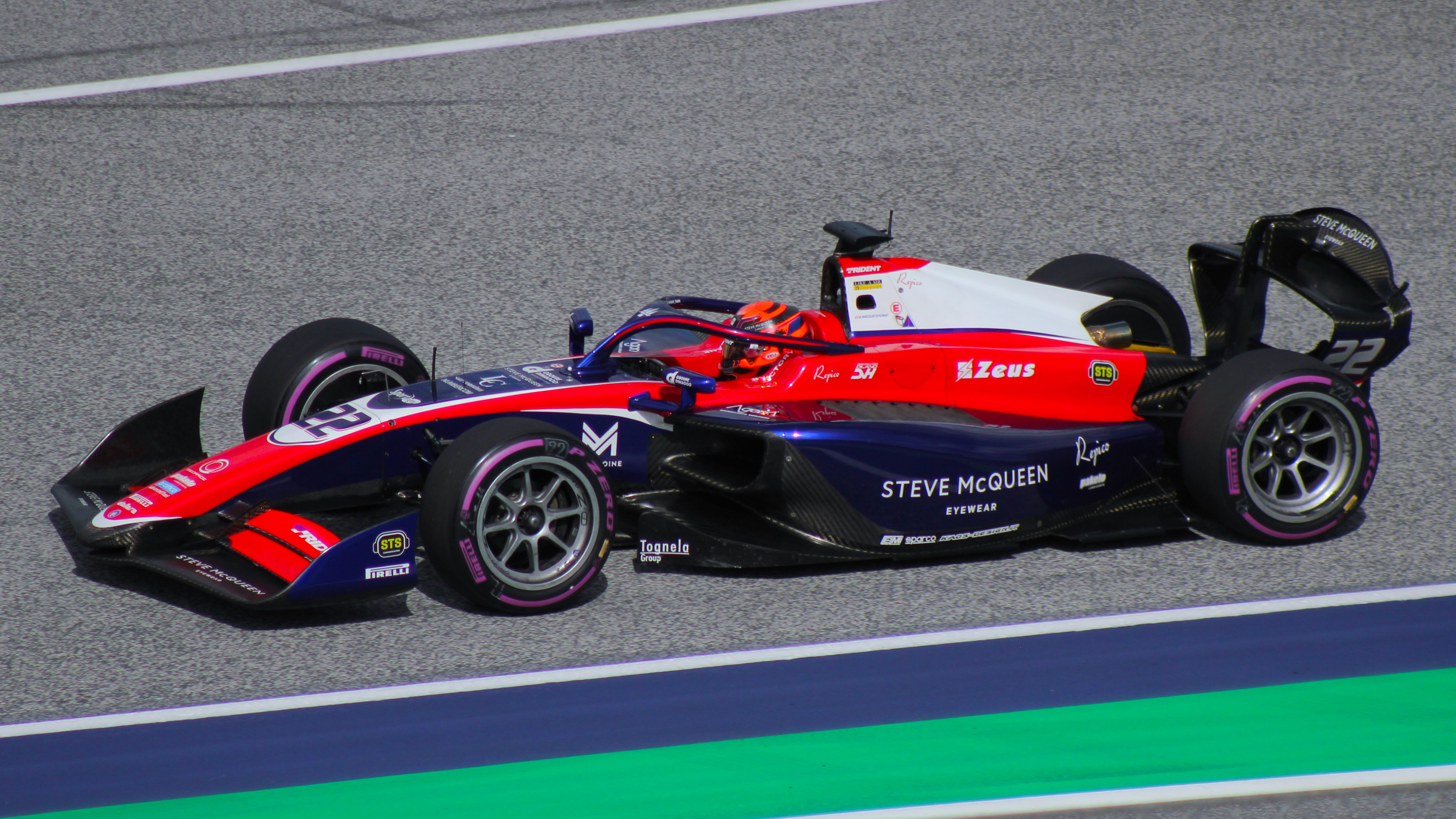
Meguetounif driving the Dallara F2 2024 during the 2025 Spielberg Formula 2 round

Meguetounif stepped up to FIA Formula 2 for the 2025 season, continuing with Trident where he partnered with Max Esterson.

However, in a difficult campaign that saw Meguetounif score only two points; being two tenth-placed finishes, he and Trident parted ways prior to the Baku round.

=== Indy NXT ===
After leaving Formula 2, Meguetounif partook in a private Indy NXT test at an undisclosed location in September 2025.

== Sportscar racing career ==
=== Asian Le Mans Series ===
At the end of 2025, Meguetounif made his sportscar debut during the 2025-26 Asian Le Mans Series with Algarve Pro Racing.

=== European Le Mans Series ===
In 2026, Megeutounif signed with TDS Racing to drive in LMP2 Pro-Am class of the 2026 European Le Mans Series.

== Personal life ==
Meguetounif was born in Marseille and raised in Marrakesh, Morocco. He is the son of Pierre Meguetounif, owner of Steve McQueen Eyewear. Meguetounif completed the Lycée in France. During this time, he lived and studied together with his FRECA teammate Victor Bernier.

== Karting record ==
=== Karting career summary ===
| Season | Series | Team | Position |
|---|---|---|---|
| 2013 | Championnat Regional PACAC — Mini | | **2nd** |
| 2013 | Coupe de France — Mini | | 10th |
| 2013 | Challenge Rotax Max France — Mini | | 4th |
| 2014 | Coupe de France — Mini | | 26th |
| 2014 | Challenge Rotax Max France — Mini | | 5th |
| 2015 | Championnat Regional PACAC — Minime | | **1st** |
| 2015 | National Series Karting — Minime | | **2nd** |
| 2015 | Coupe de France — Minime | | 11th |
| 2015 | Challenge Rotax Max France — Minime | | **2nd** |
| 2015 | Championnat de France — Minime | | 6th |
| 2016 | Championnat de France — Cadet | | 9th |
| 2016 | Coupe de France — Cadet | | 4th |
| 2016 | National Series Karting — Cadet | | 8th |
| 2016 | Challenge Rotax Max France — Cadet | | 8th |
| 2017 | Coupe de France — OKJ | | 19th |
| 2017 | Finale Nationale X30 — X30 Junior | | **1st** |
| 2017 | CIK-FIA Academy Trophy | Meguetounif, Pierre | 5th |
| 2017 | Championnat de France — Nationale | | **1st** |
| 2017 | CIK-FIA World Championship — OKJ | Goudant, Cedric | 30th |
| 2017 | IAME International Final — X30 Junior | | 32nd |
| 2017 | Rotax Max Challenge Grand Finals — Rotax Junior | Meguetounif, Pierre | **2nd** |
| 2018 | WSK Champions Cup — OKJ | Formula K Racing Team | 32nd |
| 2018 | South Garda Winter Cup — OKJ | Formula K Racing Team | **2nd** |
| 2018 | WSK Super Master Series — OKJ | Formula K Racing Team | 16th |
| 2018 | WSK Open Cup — OKJ | Formula K Racing Team | 13th |
| 2018 | Championnat de France — Nationale | | **1st** |
| 2018 | CIK-FIA European Championship — OKJ | Formula K Racing Team | 36th |
| 2018 | CIK-FIA Academy Trophy | Meguetounif, Pierre | 4th |
| 2018 | CIK-FIA World Championship — OKJ | Team Oakes | 27th |
| 2018 | WSK Final Cup — OK | Team Oakes | 15th |
| 2019 | South Garda Winter Cup — OK | Tony Kart Racing Team | 12th |
| 2019 | WSK Super Master Series — OK | Tony Kart Racing Team | 16th |
| 2019 | WSK Euro Series — OK | Tony Kart Racing Team | 28th |
| 2019 | Championnat de France — OK | | **3rd** |
| 2019 | CIK-FIA European Championship — OK | VDK Racing | 50th |
| 2019 | CIK-FIA World Championship — OK | VDK Racing | 14th |

=== Complete CIK-FIA Karting European Championship results ===
(key) (Races in bold indicate pole position) (Races in italics indicate fastest lap)

| Year | Team | Class | 1 | 2 | 3 | 4 | 5 | 6 | 7 | 8 | DC | Points |
|---|---|---|---|---|---|---|---|---|---|---|---|---|
| 2018 | Formula K Racing Team | OKJ | SAR; QH; 32 | SAR; R 30 | PFI; QH; 14 | PFI; R 15 | AMP; QH; 55 | AMP; R DNQ | AUB; QH; 43 | AUB; R DNQ | 36th | 2 |
| 2019 | VDK Racing | OK | ANG; QH; 39 | ANG; R DNQ | GEN; QH; 19 | GEN; R 33 | KRI; QH; 40 | KRI; R DNQ | LEM; QH; 41 | LEM; R DNQ | 50th | 0 |

== Racing record ==
=== Racing career summary ===
| Season | Series | Team | Races | Wins | Poles | F/Laps | Podiums | Points | Position |
|---|---|---|---|---|---|---|---|---|---|
| 2019 | French F4 Championship | FFSA Academy | 3 | 0 | 0 | 0 | 0 | 0 | NC† |
| 2019 | Formula 4 SEA Championship | Meritus.GP | 4 | 0 | 0 | 1 | 3 | 0 | NC† |
| 2020 | French F4 Championship | FFSA Academy | 21 | 1 | 2 | 1 | 8 | 183 | 4th |
| 2021 | ADAC Formula 4 Championship | R-ace GP | 18 | 0 | 0 | 0 | 0 | 61 | 11th |
| 2021 | Italian F4 Championship | R-ace GP | 6 | 0 | 0 | 0 | 0 | 22 | 19th |
| 2021 | Formula Regional European Championship | R-ace GP | 4 | 0 | 0 | 0 | 0 | 0 | NC† |
| 2022 | Formula Regional Asian Championship | Evans GP | 3 | 0 | 0 | 0 | 0 | 6 | 20th |
| 2022 | Formula Regional European Championship | MP Motorsport | 19 | 0 | 0 | 0 | 1 | 21 | 16th |
| 2023 | Formula Regional Middle East Championship | Hyderabad Blackbirds by MP | 15 | 1 | 2 | 0 | 2 | 65 | 10th |
| 2023 | Formula Regional European Championship | MP Motorsport | 18 | 0 | 0 | 2 | 3 | 75 | 9th |
| 2024 | FIA Formula 3 Championship | Trident | 20 | 2 | 0 | 0 | 2 | 84 | 8th |
| 2025 | FIA Formula 2 Championship | Trident | 21 | 0 | 0 | 0 | 0 | 2 | 21st |
| 2025-26 | Asian Le Mans Series – LMP2 | Algarve Pro Racing | 6 | 0 | 0 | 0 | 2 | 45 | 6th |
| 2026 | European Le Mans Series – LMP2 Pro-Am | TDS Racing | 6 | 1 | 0 | 1 | 2 | 77 | **2nd** |
| 2026 | 24 Hours of Le Mans – LMP2 Pro-Am | TDS Racing | Reserve driver | | | | | | |
| 2026 | 24 Hours of Le Mans – LMP2 | Forestier Racing by Panis | Reserve driver | | | | | | |
| 2026 | European Endurance Prototype Cup | DB Autosport by MB Performance | 1 | 0 | 0 | 0 | 0 | 10* | 24th* |
| 2027 | IMSA SportsCar Championship – LMP2 | TDS Racing | 0 | 0 | 0 | 0 | 0 | – | TBD |

^{†} As Meguetounif was a guest driver, he was ineligible to score points.
* Season still in progress.

=== Complete French F4 Championship results ===
(key) (Races in bold indicate pole position) (Races in italics indicate fastest lap)

| Year | 1 | 2 | 3 | 4 | 5 | 6 | 7 | 8 | 9 | 10 | 11 | 12 | 13 | 14 | 15 | 16 | 17 | 18 | 19 | 20 | 21 | Pos | Points |
|---|---|---|---|---|---|---|---|---|---|---|---|---|---|---|---|---|---|---|---|---|---|---|---|
| 2019 | NOG; 1 | NOG; 2 | NOG; 3 | PAU; 1 | PAU; 2 | PAU; 3 | SPA; 1 | SPA; 2 | SPA; 3 | LÉD; 1 | LÉD; 2 | LÉD; 3 | HUN; 1 | HUN; 2 | HUN; 3 | MAG; 1 | MAG; 2 | MAG; 3 | LEC; 1; 5 | LEC; 2 Ret | LEC; 3; 7 | NC† | 0 |
| 2020 | NOG; 1; 5 | NOG; 2; 9 | NOG; 3; 11† | MAG; 1; 2 | MAG; 2; 4 | MAG; 3; 4 | ZAN; 1; 8 | ZAN; 2; 10 | ZAN; 3 Ret | LEC1; 1; 3 | LEC1; 2; 12† | LEC1; 3; 5 | **SPA**; **1**; 2 | SPA; 2; 3 | **SPA**; **3**; 2 | LEC2; 1; 8 | LEC2; 2; 1 | LEC2; 3; 3 | LEC3; 1; 3 | LEC3; 2 Ret | LEC3; 3; 4 | 4th | 183 |

^{†} As Meguetounif was a guest driver, he was ineligible to score points.

=== Complete ADAC Formula 4 Championship results ===
(key) (Races in bold indicate pole position) (Races in italics indicate fastest lap)

| Year | Team | 1 | 2 | 3 | 4 | 5 | 6 | 7 | 8 | 9 | 10 | 11 | 12 | 13 | 14 | 15 | 16 | 17 | 18 | Pos | Points |
|---|---|---|---|---|---|---|---|---|---|---|---|---|---|---|---|---|---|---|---|---|---|
| 2021 | R-ace GP | RBR; 1; 8 | RBR; 2; 15 | RBR; 3; 6 | ZAN; 1; 22† | ZAN; 2; 7 | ZAN; 3; 14 | HOC1; 1 Ret | HOC1; 2; 11 | HOC1; 3 Ret | SAC; 1; 6 | SAC; 2; 8 | SAC; 3; 6 | HOC2; 1 Ret | HOC2; 2; 8 | HOC2; 3; 6 | NÜR; 1; 10 | NÜR; 2; 14 | NÜR; 3; 6 | 11th | 61 |

=== Complete Italian F4 Championship results ===
(key) (Races in bold indicate pole position) (Races in italics indicate fastest lap)

| Year | Team | 1 | 2 | 3 | 4 | 5 | 6 | 7 | 8 | 9 | 10 | 11 | 12 | 13 | 14 | 15 | 16 | 17 | 18 | 19 | 20 | 21 | DC | Points |
|---|---|---|---|---|---|---|---|---|---|---|---|---|---|---|---|---|---|---|---|---|---|---|---|---|
| 2021 | R-ace GP | LEC; 1; 11 | LEC; 2 Ret | LEC; 3; 14 | MIS; 1; 8 | MIS; 2; 6 | MIS; 3; 5 | VLL; 1 | VLL; 2 | VLL; 3 | IMO; 1 | IMO; 2 | IMO; 3 | RBR; 1 | RBR; 2 | RBR; 3 | MUG; 1 | MUG; 2 | MUG; 3 | MNZ; 1 | MNZ; 2 | MNZ; 3 | 19th | 22 |

=== Complete Formula Regional European Championship results ===
(key) (Races in bold indicate pole position) (Races in italics indicate fastest lap)

| Year | Team | 1 | 2 | 3 | 4 | 5 | 6 | 7 | 8 | 9 | 10 | 11 | 12 | 13 | 14 | 15 | 16 | 17 | 18 | 19 | 20 | DC | Points |
|---|---|---|---|---|---|---|---|---|---|---|---|---|---|---|---|---|---|---|---|---|---|---|---|
| 2021 | R-ace GP | IMO; 1 | IMO; 2 | CAT; 1 | CAT; 2 | MCO; 1 | MCO; 2 | LEC; 1 | LEC; 2 | ZAN; 1 | ZAN; 2 | SPA; 1 | SPA; 2 | RBR; 1 | RBR; 2 | VAL; 1 | VAL; 2 | MUG; 1; 22 | MUG; 2; 20 | MNZ; 1; 15 | MNZ; 2; 13 | NC† | 0 |
| 2022 | MP Motorsport | MNZ; 1; 9 | MNZ; 2; 11 | IMO; 1 Ret | IMO; 2 DNS | MCO; 1; 15 | MCO; 2; 11 | LEC; 1; 15 | LEC; 2; 19 | ZAN; 1; 13 | ZAN; 2; 16 | HUN; 1; 17 | HUN; 2 Ret | SPA; 1; 2 | SPA; 2; 11 | RBR; 1; 11 | RBR; 2; 15 | CAT; 1; 20 | CAT; 2; 21 | MUG; 1; 16 | MUG; 2; 28 | 16th | 21 |
| 2023 | MP Motorsport | IMO; 1; 17 | IMO; 2; 22 | CAT; 1 Ret | CAT; 2; 3 | HUN; 1; 11 | HUN; 2; 7 | SPA; 1 Ret | SPA; 2; 9 | MUG; 1 | MUG; 2 | LEC; 1; 2 | LEC; 2; 14 | RBR; 1; 6 | RBR; 2; 2 | MNZ; 1 Ret | MNZ; 2; 10 | ZAN; 1; 12 | ZAN; 2; 9 | HOC; 1; 13 | HOC; 2 Ret | 9th | 75 |

^{†} As Meguetounif was a guest driver, he was ineligible to score points.

=== Complete Formula Regional Asian Championship results ===
(key) (Races in bold indicate pole position) (Races in italics indicate the fastest lap of top ten finishers)

| Year | Entrant | 1 | 2 | 3 | 4 | 5 | 6 | 7 | 8 | 9 | 10 | 11 | 12 | 13 | 14 | 15 | DC | Points |
|---|---|---|---|---|---|---|---|---|---|---|---|---|---|---|---|---|---|---|
| 2022 | Evans GP | ABU; 1 | ABU; 2 | ABU; 3 | DUB; 1 | DUB; 2 | DUB; 3 | DUB; 1 | DUB; 2 | DUB; 3 | DUB; 1 | DUB; 2 | DUB; 3 | ABU; 1; 13 | ABU; 2; 7 | ABU; 3; 22 | 20th | 6 |

=== Complete Formula Regional Middle East Championship results ===
(key) (Races in bold indicate pole position) (Races in italics indicate fastest lap)

| Year | Entrant | 1 | 2 | 3 | 4 | 5 | 6 | 7 | 8 | 9 | 10 | 11 | 12 | 13 | 14 | 15 | DC | Points |
|---|---|---|---|---|---|---|---|---|---|---|---|---|---|---|---|---|---|---|
| 2023 | Hyderabad Blackbirds by MP | DUB1; 1 Ret | DUB1; 2 Ret | DUB1; 3 Ret | KUW1; 1; 17 | KUW1; 2; 4 | **KUW1**; **3**; 1 | KUW2; 1; 25† | KUW2; 2; 12 | **KUW2**; **3**; 5 | DUB2; 1; 13 | DUB2; 2; 18 | DUB2; 3 Ret | ABU; 1; 2 | ABU; 2 Ret | ABU; 3 Ret | 10th | 65 |

† – Driver did not finish the race but was classified, as he completed more than 90% of the race distance.

=== Complete FIA Formula 3 Championship results ===
(key) (Races in bold indicate pole position) (Races in italics indicate fastest lap)

| Year | Entrant | 1 | 2 | 3 | 4 | 5 | 6 | 7 | 8 | 9 | 10 | 11 | 12 | 13 | 14 | 15 | 16 | 17 | 18 | 19 | 20 | DC | Points |
|---|---|---|---|---|---|---|---|---|---|---|---|---|---|---|---|---|---|---|---|---|---|---|---|
| 2024 | Trident | BHR; SPR; 10 | BHR; FEA; 4 | MEL; SPR; 17 | MEL; FEA; 12 | IMO; SPR; Ret | IMO; FEA; 1 | MON; SPR; 22† | MON; FEA; Ret | CAT; SPR; Ret | CAT; FEA; 15 | RBR; SPR; 10 | RBR; FEA; 20 | SIL; SPR; 8 | SIL; FEA; 12 | HUN; SPR; 10 | HUN; FEA; 25 | SPA; SPR; 27 | SPA; FEA; 5 | MNZ; SPR; 5 | MNZ; FEA; 1 | 8th | 84 |

=== Complete FIA Formula 2 Championship results ===
(key) (Races in bold indicate pole position) (Races in italics indicate fastest lap)

| Year | Entrant | 1 | 2 | 3 | 4 | 5 | 6 | 7 | 8 | 9 | 10 | 11 | 12 | 13 | 14 | 15 | 16 | 17 | 18 | 19 | 20 | 21 | 22 | 23 | 24 | 25 | 26 | 27 | 28 | DC | Points |
|---|---|---|---|---|---|---|---|---|---|---|---|---|---|---|---|---|---|---|---|---|---|---|---|---|---|---|---|---|---|---|---|
| 2025 | Trident | MEL; SPR; Ret | MEL; FEA; C | BHR; SPR; 13 | BHR; FEA; 15 | JED; SPR; 16 | JED; FEA; Ret | IMO; SPR; 21 | IMO; FEA; 10 | MON; SPR; 16 | MON; FEA; 12 | CAT; SPR; 9 | CAT; FEA; 12 | RBR; SPR; Ret | RBR; FEA; 10 | SIL; SPR; 13 | SIL; FEA; 18 | SPA; SPR; 18† | SPA; FEA; 15 | HUN; SPR; 17 | HUN; FEA; 14 | MNZ; SPR; Ret | MNZ; FEA; Ret | BAK; SPR | BAK; FEA | LSL; SPR | LSL; FEA | YMC; SPR | YMC; FEA | 21st | 2 |

* Season still in progress.

=== Complete Asian Le Mans Series results ===
(key) (Races in bold indicate pole position) (Races in italics indicate fastest lap)

| Year | Team | Class | Car | Engine | 1 | 2 | 3 | 4 | 5 | 6 | Pos. | Points |
|---|---|---|---|---|---|---|---|---|---|---|---|---|
| 2025–26 | Algarve Pro Racing | LMP2 | Oreca 07 | Gibson GK428 4.2 L V8 | SEP; 1; 13 | SEP; 2; 13 | DUB; 1; 13 | DUB; 2; 3 | ABU; 1; 2 | ABU; 2; 4 | 6th | 45 |

=== Complete European Le Mans Series results ===
(key) (Races in bold indicate pole position; results in italics indicate fastest lap)

| Year | Entrant | Class | Chassis | Engine | 1 | 2 | 3 | 4 | 5 | 6 | Rank | Points |
|---|---|---|---|---|---|---|---|---|---|---|---|---|
| 2026 | TDS Racing | LMP2 Pro-Am | Oreca 07 | Gibson GK428 4.2 L V8 | CAT; 4 | LEC; 4 | IMO; Ret | SPA; 4 | **SIL**; 1 | ALG; 3 | 2nd | 77 |
