= 2024 Monza Formula 3 round =

Motor racing event

(Italy) 2024 Monza Formula 3 round
Round details
- Round 10 of 10 in the 2024 FIA Formula 3 Championship.
- Location: Monza Circuit; Monza, Italy
- Course: Permanent racing facility 5.793 km (3.599 mi)

Sprint Race
- Date: 31 August 2024
- Laps: 17
Podium
First	(Germany) Tim Tramnitz	MP Motorsport
Second	(Mexico) Santiago Ramos	Trident
Third	(Republic of Ireland) Alex Dunne	MP Motorsport
Fastest lap
Driver	(Italy) Leonardo Fornaroli	Trident
- Time: 1:38.802 (on lap 9)

Feature Race
- Date: 1 September 2024
- Laps: 22
Pole position
Driver	(Italy) Leonardo Fornaroli	Trident
Time	1:38.287	
Podium
First	(France) Sami Meguetounif	Trident
Second	(Italy) Leonardo Fornaroli	Trident
Third	(Australia) Christian Mansell	ART Grand Prix
Fastest lap
Driver	(Norway) Martinius Stenshorne	Hitech Pulse-Eight
- Time: 1:39.435 (on lap 11)

The 2024 Monza Formula 3 round was a motor racing event held between 30 August and 1 September at the Monza Circuit. It was the final race of the 2024 FIA Formula 3 Championship and was held in support of the 2024 Italian Grand Prix.

Leonardo Fornaroli was crowned 2024 Formula 3 Drivers' Champion after a last-lap-overtake on the final corner over Christian Mansell in the Feature Race. He became the first Italian driver to win the Formula 3 championship as well as the first champion to take the title without winning any race across the entire season.

This weekend also marked the final one using the Dallara F3 2019 chassis, which debuted in the inaugural 2019 season. Starting in 2025, a new chassis will be introduced.

== Background ==
=== Driver changes ===
Oliver Goethe vacated his seat at Campos Racing and moved up to Formula 2 with MP Motorsport to replace the Formula One-bound Franco Colapinto. The Campos seat was filled by Formula Regional European Championship driver Noah Strømsted.

=== Championship standings before this round ===
Going into the final race of the season, six drivers still had chances of winning the title, with Leonardo Fornaroli leading the championship with 129 points, being only one point ahead of second-placed Gabriele Minì. Further back, the two Brits Luke Browning and Arvid Lindblad were placed in third and fourth with 123 and 112 points, respectively. Dino Beganovic entered the final round in fifth position, having scored 100 points, three points clear from sixth-placed Christian Mansell (97). Even though Oliver Goethe (94 points) who was seventh in the standings, mathematically still had slim chances of winning the championship, he was ruled out of contention prior to the weekend following his promotion to Formula 2.

However, the Teams' Championship was already wrapped up at the previous round in Belgium in favour of Prema Racing, who secured its fifth Teams' Championship in six seasons with an unassailable 115-point-lead over ART Grand Prix, with 89 points still on the line.

== Classification ==
=== Qualifying ===
==== Group A ====
Qualifying for Group A was held on 30 August 2024, at 15:00 local time (UTC+2).

Pos.	No.	Driver	Team	Time	Gap	Grid SR	Grid FR
1	4	(Italy) Leonardo Fornaroli	Trident	1:38.287	–	16^{1}	1
2	2	(Italy) Gabriele Minì	Prema Racing	1:38.543	+0.256	14^{1}	3
3	6	(Mexico) Santiago Ramos	Trident	1:38.704	+0.417	4	5
4	28	(Austria) Joshua Dufek	AIX Racing	1:38.832	+0.545	10^{1}	7
5	12	(Spain) Mari Boya	Campos Racing	1:38.872	+0.585	8^{1}	9
6	26	(Thailand) Tasanapol Inthraphuvasak	AIX Racing	1:39.115	+0.828	6^{1}	11
7	14	(United Kingdom) Luke Browning	Hitech Pulse-Eight	1:39.124	+0.837	17^{1}	13
8	30	(Poland) Piotr Wiśnicki	Rodin Motorsport	1:39.273	+0.986	20^{1}	15
9	20	(Mexico) Noel León	Van Amersfoort Racing	1:39.350	+1.063	21^{1}	17
10	18	(United States) Max Esterson	Jenzer Motorsport	1:39.494	+1.207	22^{1}	19
11	16	(United Kingdom) Cian Shields	Hitech Pulse-Eight	1:39.717	+1.430	15	21
12	10	(Denmark) Noah Strømsted	Campos Racing	1:25.995	+1.590	26^{1}	23
13	22	(Australia) Tommy Smith	Van Amersfoort Racing	1:40.216	+1.929	27^{1}	25
107% time: 1:45.167 (+6.880)
—	24	(Netherlands) Laurens van Hoepen	ART Grand Prix	No time set	—	29^{2}	29^{2}
—	8	(Poland) Kacper Sztuka	MP Motorsport	No time set	—	PL^{2}	PL^{2}

Notes:

- ^1 – Leonardo Fornaroli, Gabriele Minì, Joshua Dufek, Mari Boya, Tasanapol Inthraphuvasak, Luke Browning, Piotr Wiśnicki, Noel León, Max Esterson, Noah Strømsted and Tommy Smith all received four-place grid-penalties for driving unnecessarily slowly.
- ^2 – Kacper Sztuka and Laurens van Hoepen both did not set a valid lap time during qualifying, but were later given permission by the stewards to start both races from the back of the grid and from the pit lane, respectively.

==== Group B ====
Qualifying for Group B was held on 30 August 2024, at 15:20 local time (UTC+2).

Pos.	No.	Driver	Team	Time	Gap	Grid SR	Grid FR
1	9	(Republic of Ireland) Alex Dunne	MP Motorsport	1:38.818	–	7	2
2	5	(France) Sami Meguetounif	Trident	1:38.860	+0.042	5	4
3	11	(Colombia) Sebastián Montoya	Campos Racing	1:38.899	+0.081	3	6
4	23	(Australia) Christian Mansell	ART Grand Prix	1:38.905	+0.087	9^{1}	8
5	1	(Sweden) Dino Beganovic	Prema Racing	1:38.956	+0.138	2	10
6	7	(Germany) Tim Tramnitz	MP Motorsport	1:38.959	+0.141	1	12
7	31	(United Kingdom) Joseph Loake	Rodin Motorsport	1:39.020	+0.202	11	14
8	25	(Bulgaria) Nikola Tsolov	ART Grand Prix	1:39.129	+0.311	19^{1}	16
9	3	(United Kingdom) Arvid Lindblad	Prema Racing	1:39.219	+0.401	12	18
10	15	(Norway) Martinius Stenshorne	Hitech Pulse-Eight	1:39.273	+0.455	13	20
11	29	(United Kingdom) Callum Voisin	Rodin Motorsport	1:39.294	+0.476	18	22
12	27	(Italy) Nikita Bedrin (Note: Bedrin is a Russian driver competing under an Italian licence.)	AIX Racing	1:39.321	+0.503	23	24
13	17	(Austria) Charlie Wurz	Jenzer Motorsport	1:39.409	+0.591	24	26
14	21	(Germany) Sophia Flörsch	Van Amersfoort Racing	1:39.550	+0.732	25	27
107% time: 1:45.735 (+6.917)
—	19	(Peru) Matías Zagazeta	Jenzer Motorsport	2:45.165	+1:06.347	28^{2}	28^{2}

Notes:

- ^1 – Christian Mansell and Nikola Tsolov both received a three-place grid penalty for impeding other drivers during qualifying. In the Sprint race, both will start from ninth and nineteenth place, respectively.
- ^2 – Matías Zagazeta failed to set a time within the 107%-rule, but was later given permission by the stewards to start both races from the back of the grid.

=== Sprint Race ===
The Sprint race was held on 31 August 2024, at 09:30 local time (UTC+2).

Pos.	No.	Driver	Team	Laps	Time/Gap	Grid	Pts.
1	7	(Germany) Tim Tramnitz	MP Motorsport	17	33:52.339	1	10
2	6	(Mexico) Santiago Ramos	Trident	17	+0.911	4	9
3	9	(Republic of Ireland) Alex Dunne	MP Motorsport	17	+1.375	7	8
4	1	(Sweden) Dino Beganovic	Prema Racing	17	+1.937	2	7
5	5	(France) Sami Meguetounif	Trident	17	+4.050	5	6
6	14	(United Kingdom) Luke Browning	Hitech Pulse-Eight	17	+4.126	17	5
7	12	(Spain) Mari Boya	Campos Racing	17	+4.360	8	4
8	4	(Italy) Leonardo Fornaroli	Trident	17	+4.843	16	3 (1)
9	2	(Italy) Gabriele Minì	Prema Racing	17	+5.108	14	2
10	15	(Norway) Martinius Stenshorne	Hitech Pulse-Eight	17	+5.593	13	1
11	11	(Colombia) Sebastián Montoya	Campos Racing	17	+5.779^{1}	3	
12	3	(United Kingdom) Arvid Lindblad	Prema Racing	17	+5.927	12	
13	24	(Netherlands) Laurens van Hoepen	ART Grand Prix	17	+6.595	29	
14	19	(Peru) Matías Zagazeta	Jenzer Motorsport	17	+6.773	28	
15	31	(United Kingdom) Joseph Loake	Rodin Motorsport	17	+6.812	11	
16	21	(Germany) Sophia Flörsch	Van Amersfoort Racing	17	+6.852	25	
17	10	(Denmark) Noah Strømsted	Campos Racing	17	+6.995	26	
18	8	(Poland) Kacper Sztuka	MP Motorsport	17	+8.668	PL	
19	25	(Bulgaria) Nikola Tsolov	ART Grand Prix	17	+11.030	19	
20	16	(United Kingdom) Cian Shields	Hitech Pulse-Eight	17	+12.389^{2}	15	
21	26	(Thailand) Tasanapol Inthraphuvasak	AIX Racing	17	+17.500^{3}	6	
22	23	(Australia) Christian Mansell	ART Grand Prix	17	+18.075^{4}	9	
23	22	(Australia) Tommy Smith	Van Amersfoort Racing	17	+18.511^{5}	27	
24	17	(Austria) Charlie Wurz	Jenzer Motorsport	16	+1 lap	24	
25	29	(United Kingdom) Callum Voisin	Rodin Motorsport	16	+1 lap	18	
DNF	28	(Austria) Joshua Dufek	AIX Racing	13	Retired	10	
DNF	18	(United States) Max Esterson	Jenzer Motorsport	12	Collision	22	
DNF	30	(Poland) Piotr Wiśnicki	Rodin Motorsport	12	Collision	20	
DNF	27	(Italy) Nikita Bedrin	AIX Racing	1	Collision/Spun off	22	
DNF	20	(Mexico) Noel León	Van Amersfoort Racing	1	Collision/Spun off	21	
Fastest lap set by (Italy) Leonardo Fornaroli: 1:38.802 (lap 9)

Notes:

- ^1 – Sebastián Montoya originally finished second, but received a five-second time penalty for forcing another driver off track.
- ^2 – Cian Shields received a five-second time penalty for causing a collision.
- ^3 – Tasanapol Inthraphuvasak received a ten-second time penalty for overtaking under Safety Car conditions.
- ^4 – Christian Mansell received a five-second time penalty for speeding in the pit lane.
- ^5 – Tommy Smith received a ten-second time penalty for causing a collision on lap 2, which forced Noel León and Nikita Bedrin to retire from the Sprint race.

=== Feature Race ===
The Feature race was held on 1 September 2024, at 08:30 local time (UTC+2).

Pos.	No.	Driver	Team	Laps	Time/Gap	Grid	Pts.
1	5	(France) Sami Meguetounif	Trident	22	39:58.179	4	25
2	4	(Italy) Leonardo Fornaroli	Trident	22	+4.587	1	18 (2)
3	23	(Australia) Christian Mansell	ART Grand Prix	22	+5.522	8	15
4	9	(Republic of Ireland) Alex Dunne	MP Motorsport	22	+6.862	2	12
5	15	(Norway) Martinius Stenshorne	Hitech Pulse-Eight	22	+10.650	19	10 (1)
6	7	(Germany) Tim Tramnitz	MP Motorsport	22	+12.889	12	8
7	20	(Mexico) Noel León	Van Amersfoort Racing	22	+14.664	22^{1}	6
8	24	(Netherlands) Laurens van Hoepen	ART Grand Prix	22	+15.429	29	4
9	1	(Sweden) Dino Beganovic	Prema Racing	22	+17.071	10	2
10	28	(Austria) Joshua Dufek	AIX Racing	22	+18.796	7	1
11	26	(Thailand) Tasanapol Inthraphuvasak	AIX Racing	22	+21.060^{2}	11	
12	8	(Poland) Kacper Sztuka	MP Motorsport	22	+22.874	30	
13	27	(Italy) Nikita Bedrin	AIX Racing	22	+23.472	24	
14	17	(Austria) Charlie Wurz	Jenzer Motorsport	22	+23.591	26	
15	22	(Australia) Tommy Smith	Van Amersfoort Racing	22	+23.657	25	
16	3	(United Kingdom) Arvid Lindblad	Prema Racing	22	+25.794^{2}	17	
17	25	(Bulgaria) Nikola Tsolov	ART Grand Prix	22	+26.469	16	
18	6	(Mexico) Santiago Ramos	Trident	22	+26.913	5	
19	31	(United Kingdom) Joseph Loake	Rodin Motorsport	22	+27.597	14	
20	14	(United Kingdom) Luke Browning	Hitech Pulse-Eight	22	+31.505^{3} ^{4}	13	
21	11	(Colombia) Sebastián Montoya	Campos Racing	22	+1:38.106^{5}	6	
22	29	(United Kingdom) Callum Voisin	Rodin Motorsport	21	+1 lap	21	
23	10	(Denmark) Noah Strømsted	Campos Racing	21	+1 lap^{3}	27	
DNF	18	(United States) Max Esterson	Jenzer Motorsport	14	Retired^{3} ^{5}	18	
DNF	12	(Spain) Mari Boya	Campos Racing	9	Retired	9	
DNF	30	(Poland) Piotr Wiśnicki	Rodin Motorsport	3	Collision damage	15	
DNF	16	(United Kingdom) Cian Shields	Hitech Pulse-Eight	2	Collision	20	
DNF	21	(Germany) Sophia Flörsch	Van Amersfoort Racing	2	Collision	27	
DNF	19	(Peru) Matías Zagazeta	Jenzer Motorsport	2	Collision	28	
DSQ	2	(Italy) Gabriele Minì	Prema Racing	22	Disqualified^{6}	3	
Fastest lap set by (Norway) Martinius Stenshorne: 1:39.435 (lap 11)

Notes:

- ^1 – Noel León received a five-place grid drop for causing a collision with Nikola Tsolov at the Sprint race.
- ^2 – Tasanapol Inthraphuvasak originally finished seventh, but he received a ten-second time penalty for failing to follow Race Director's instructions.
- ^3 – Arvid Lindblad, Luke Browning, Noah Strømsted and Max Esterson all received ten-second time penalties for causing collisions. However, the penalty did not affect Esterson's final position as he retired from the race.
- ^4 – Luke Browning received a further five-second time penalty for a Safety Car infringement.
- ^5 – Sebastián Montoya and Max Esterson both received five-second time penalties for a Safety Car infringement. However, the penalty did not affect the final positions of both drivers.
- ^6 – Gabriele Minì originally finished second, but has been disqualified from the race after his car was found to be in breach of Article 12.9 of the 2024 FIA Formula 3 Technical Regulations. A post-race report from FIA Technical Delegate indicated that Car 2 had not met the minimum requirement with regards to its tyre pressures.

== Final championship standings ==
Drivers' Championship standings

	Pos.	Driver	Points
	1	(Italy) Leonardo Fornaroli	153
	2	(Italy) Gabriele Minì	130
	3	(United Kingdom) Luke Browning	128
	4	(United Kingdom) Arvid Lindblad	113
1	5	(Australia) Christian Mansell	112

Teams' Championship standings

	Pos.	Team	Points
	1	(Italy) Prema Racing	352
1	2	(Italy) Trident	281
1	3	(France) ART Grand Prix	245
	4	(Spain) Campos Racing	179
	5	(United Kingdom) Hitech Pulse-Eight	166

- Note: Only the top five positions are included for both sets of standings.
- Note: Bold names include the 2024 Drivers' and Teams' Champion respectively.

== See also ==
- 2024 Italian Grand Prix
- 2024 Monza Formula 2 round

== Notes ==
Previous round: 2024 Spa-Francorchamps Formula 3 round	FIA Formula 3 Championship; 2024 season	Next round: 2025 Melbourne Formula 3 round
Previous round: 2023 Monza Formula 3 round	Monza Formula 3 round	Next round: 2025 Monza Formula 3 round
