= Ayato Iwasaki =

Japanese racing driver (born 2004)

- Nationality: (Japan) Japanese
- Born: 9 June 2004 (age 22) Osaka, Japan

F4 Japanese Championship career
- Debut season: 2022
- Current team: B-Max Racing Team
- Former teams: Buzz Racing
- Starts: 20
- Wins: 0
- Podiums: 0
- Poles: 0
- Fastest laps: 0
- Best finish: 14th in 2025

Previous series
- 2022–2023 2023 2022: GB3 Championship; Formula Regional Middle East Championship; Formula Regional Asian Championship

Ayato Iwasaki (岩崎 有矢斗, Iwasaki Ayato; born 9 June 2004 in Osaka) is a Japanese racing driver who last competed for B-Max Racing Team in the F4 Japanese Championship.

== Early career ==
=== Formula Regional ===
==== 2022 ====
In early 2022, Iwasaki made his car racing debut, racing in the 2022 Formula Regional Asian Championship for Pinnacle Motorsport. Iwasaki scored a best result of eleventh, in his second ever race, and finished 27th in the standings.

==== 2023 ====
Iwasaki returned to the rebranded Formula Regional Middle East Championship, replacing Pepe Martí at Pinnacle VAR for the second Kuwait round. On his return, Iwasaki scored a best result of eighteenth in race two.

=== Formula 4 ===
==== 2022 ====
At the fourth round of that year's F4 Japanese season, Iwasaki made his Formula 4 debut, replacing Katsunori Keihara at Buzz Racing. Returning to Buzz Racing for the final two rounds of the season, Iwasaki scored points in all but one of the final four races.

==== 2025 ====
Following a year spent in various karting competitions, Iwasaki returned to single-seaters, joining B-Max Racing Team ahead of the 2025 F4 Japanese Championship. Starting off the season with fourth- and fifth-place finishes in races one and three at Fuji, Iwasaki then only scored one more points finish, a tenth in race two of the following Fuji round, as he ended the year 14th in points.

=== GB3 Championship ===
==== 2022 ====
In late 2022, it was announced that Iwasaki would make his GB3 debut in the final round of that year's final round of the season at Donington Park for Elite Motorsport. On his maiden round in the championship, Iwasaki scored a best result of sixth in race three after starting from the front row.

==== 2023 ====
Iwasaki stayed with Elite Motorsport to compete full-time in the 2023 GB3 Championship. At the opening round at Oulton Park, Iwasaki went from eighth to second in race three to score his only podium in GB3. However, that would be the highest point of the season, as Iwasaki could only muster a best result of sixth in Snetterton's race three before leaving the championship with four rounds left.

== Karting record ==
=== Karting career summary ===
Season	Series	Team	Position
2019	IAME Asia Cup – X30 Senior	Stratos G51	18th
2019	IAME Series Asia – Senior	Stratos G51	10th
2019	IAME Asia Final – X30 Senior	Stratos G51	11th
2019	Asian Karting Open Championship – Formula 125 Senior Open		1st
2019	All-Japan Karting Championship – FS-125		21st
2019	All-Japan Karting Championship East Region – FS-125		12th
2019	IAME International Final – X30 Senior		NC
2020	IAME Asia Cup – X30 Senior	Stratos Motorsports	2nd
2020	All-Japan Karting Championship – OK		22nd
2021	ROK Cup Superfinal – Shifter ROK	Sovla	14th
2021	Rotax Challenge Grand Finals – Rotax Senior	Sovla	37th
2021	Rotax Max Challenge Mizunami Series – Senior Max	AP SPEED with SOVLA	1st
2021	Rotax Max Challenge Mizunami Series – KZ	AP SPEED with SOVLA	1st
2021	Suzuka Kart Race – Rok Shifter	AP SPEED with SOVLA	2nd
2021	All-Japan Karting Championship – OK		21st
2022	Suzuka Kart Race – Rok Shifter	AP Speed with Sovla	4th
2023	GPR Karting Series – Rok Shifter	Tony Kart Racing Team Japan	9th
2024	GPR Karting Series – Rok Shifter	Tony Kart Racing Team Japan	9th
2024	Hyper Kart Race – X30	FLAX Motor Sports	29th

== Racing record ==
=== Racing career summary ===
Season	Series	Team	Races	Wins	Poles	F/Laps	Podiums	Points	Position
2022	Formula Regional Asian Championship	Pinnacle Motorsport	15	0	0	0	0	0	27th
2022	F4 Japanese Championship	Buzz Racing	6	0	0	0	0	10	16th
2022	GB3 Championship	Elite Motorsport	3	0	0	0	0	24	23rd
2023	Formula Regional Middle East Championship	Pinnacle VAR	3	0	0	0	0	0	37th
2023	GB3 Championship	Elite Motorsport	12	0	0	0	1	85	24th
2025	F4 Japanese Championship	B-Max Racing Team	14	0	0	0	0	23	14th

=== Complete Formula Regional Asian/Middle East Championship results ===
(key) (Races in bold indicate pole position) (Races in italics indicate fastest lap)

Year	Entrant	1	2	3	4	5	6	7	8	9	10	11	12	13	14	15	DC	Points
2022	Pinnacle Motorsport	ABU; 1; 15	ABU; 2; 11	ABU; 3; 15	DUB; 1; 21	DUB; 2; 18	DUB; 3; 18	DUB; 1; 19	DUB; 2; 25	DUB; 3; 17	DUB; 1; 22	DUB; 2; 16	DUB; 3; 23	ABU; 1; 19	ABU; 2; 16	ABU; 3; 20	27th	0
2023	Pinnacle VAR	DUB1; 1	DUB1; 2	DUB1; 3	KUW1; 1	KUW1; 2	KUW1; 3	KUW2; 1 Ret	KUW2; 2; 18	KUW2; 3; 20	DUB2; 1	DUB2; 2	DUB2; 3	ABU; 1	ABU; 2	ABU; 3	37th	0

=== Complete F4 Japanese Championship results ===
(key) (Races in bold indicate pole position) (Races in italics indicate fastest lap)

Year	Team	1	2	3	4	5	6	7	8	9	10	11	12	13	14	DC	Points
2022	Buzz Racing	FUJ1; 1	FUJ1; 2	SUZ1; 1	SUZ1; 2	FUJ2; 1	FUJ2; 2	SUZ2; 1; 20	SUZ2; 2; 31	SUG; 1	SUG; 2	AUT; 1; 8	AUT; 2; 8	MOT; 1 Ret	MOT; 2; 9	16th	10
2025	B-Max Racing Team	FUJ1; 1; 4	FUJ1; 2; 19	FUJ1; 3; 5	FUJ2; 1; 24	FUJ2; 2; 10	SUZ; 1; 13	SUZ; 2; 15	SUG; 1; 23	SUG; 2; 15	SUG; 3; 17	AUT; 1; 13	AUT; 2; 13	MOT; 1; 17	MOT; 2; 20	14th	23

=== Complete GB3 Championship results ===
(key) (Races in bold indicate pole position) (Races in italics indicate fastest lap)

Year	Team	1	2	3	4	5	6	7	8	9	10	11	12	13	14	15	16	17	18	19	20	21	22	23	24	DC	Points
2022	Elite Motorsport	OUL; 1	OUL; 2	OUL; 3	SIL; 1	SIL; 2	SIL; 3	DON; 1	DON; 2	DON; 3	SNE; 1	SNE; 2	SNE; 3	SPA; 1	SPA; 2	SPA; 3	SIL; 1	SIL; 2	SIL; 3	BHGP; 1	BHGP; 2	BHGP; 3	DON; 1; 16	DON; 2; 12	DON; 3; 6	23rd	24
2023	Elite Motorsport	OUL; 1; 13	OUL; 2; 14	OUL; 3; 2^{6}	SIL1; 1; 22	SIL1; 2; 17	SIL1; 3; 9	SPA; 1; 17	SPA; 2; 18	SPA; 3; 8	SNE; 1; 19	SNE; 2; 14	SNE; 3; 6^{2}	SIL2; 1 WD	SIL2; 2 WD	SIL2; 3 C	BRH; 1 WD	BRH; 2 WD	BRH; 3 WD	ZAN; 1	ZAN; 2	ZAN; 3	DON; 1	DON; 2	DON; 3	24th	85
