= Sebastián Montoya =

Colombian and American racing driver (born 2005)

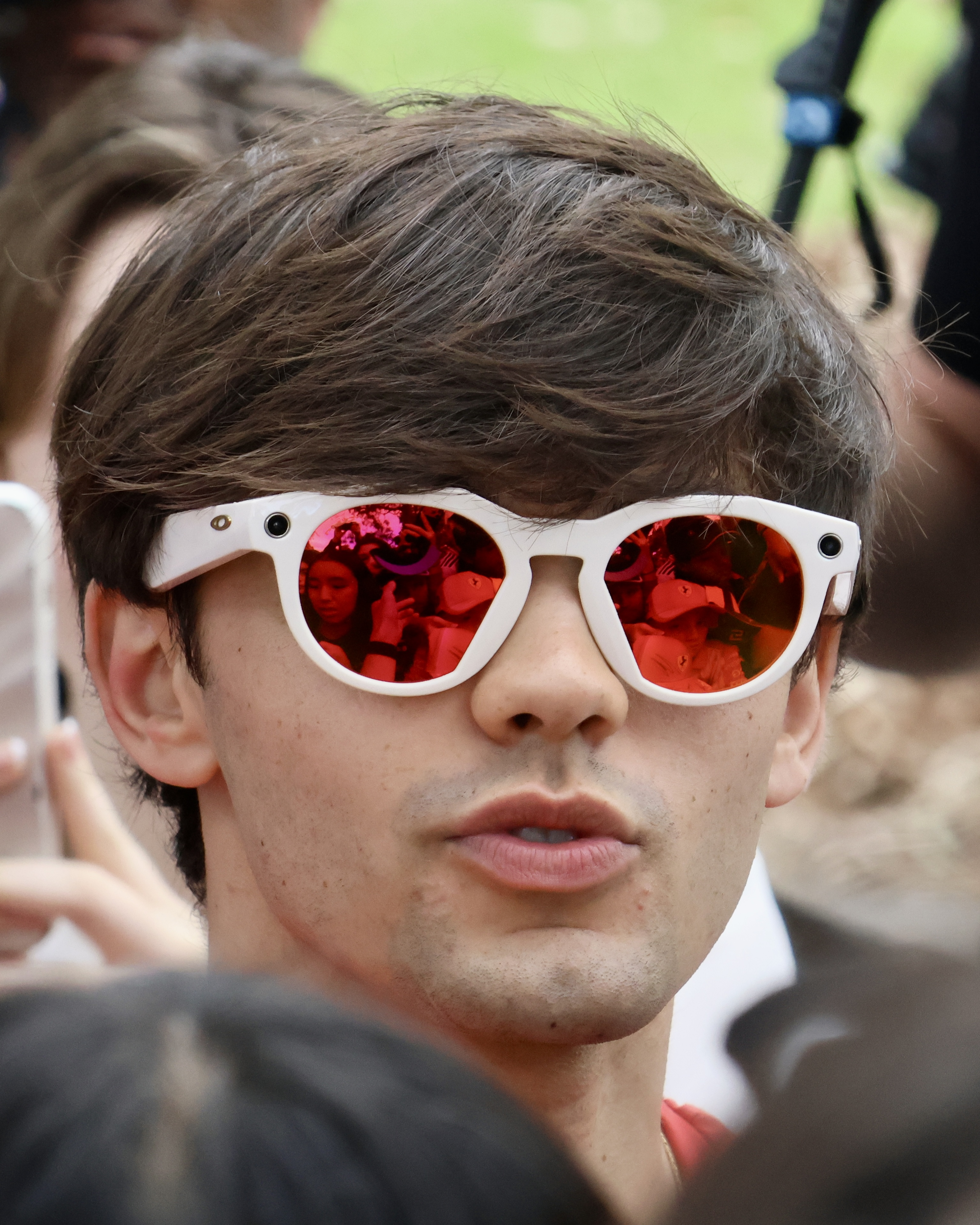
- Montoya at the Melbourne Walk during the 2026 Australian Grand Prix
- Nationality: (Colombia) Colombian (United States) American
- Born: Sebastián Montoya Freydell; 11 April 2005 (age 21) Miami, Florida, U.S.
- Relatives: Juan Pablo Montoya (father)

FIA Formula 2 Championship career
- Debut season: 2025
- Current team: Prema Racing
- Categorisation: FIA Silver
- Car number: 11
- Starts: 45
- Wins: 0
- Podiums: 4
- Poles: 0
- Fastest laps: 2
- Best finish: 12th in 2025

Previous series
- 2023; 2022–2024; 2022; 2022; 2022; 2020–2021; 2020–2021: FR Middle East; FIA Formula 3; FR European; IMSA; FR Asian; Italian F4; ADAC F4
- Statistics up to date as of 25 August 2026.

Sebastián "Sebas" Montoya Freydell (born 11 April 2005) is a Colombian and American racing driver who competes in the FIA Formula 2 Championship for Prema Racing.

The son of the former Formula One driver Juan Pablo Montoya, he is a former member of the Red Bull Junior Team. He previously competed in the FIA Formula 3 Championship in 2023 and 2024 for Hitech Pulse-Eight and Campos Racing respectively.

== Career ==
=== Karting career ===
Montoya started his competitive karting career in 2013, racing in the Rotax Micro Max class of the Florida Winter Tour when he was just eight years old. He proceeded to race in that series for the following four years, where he achieved a best result of fifth in 2016. Montoya then moved to Europe to compete in the CIK-FIA Karting European Championship in 2017. Montoya spent a total of three years in the European Karting scene, twice driving in the Karting World Championship and three times in the European Championship. In his time in karts, Montoya only won one championship at an international level; this being the Rok the Rio competition in 2018.

=== Formula 4 ===
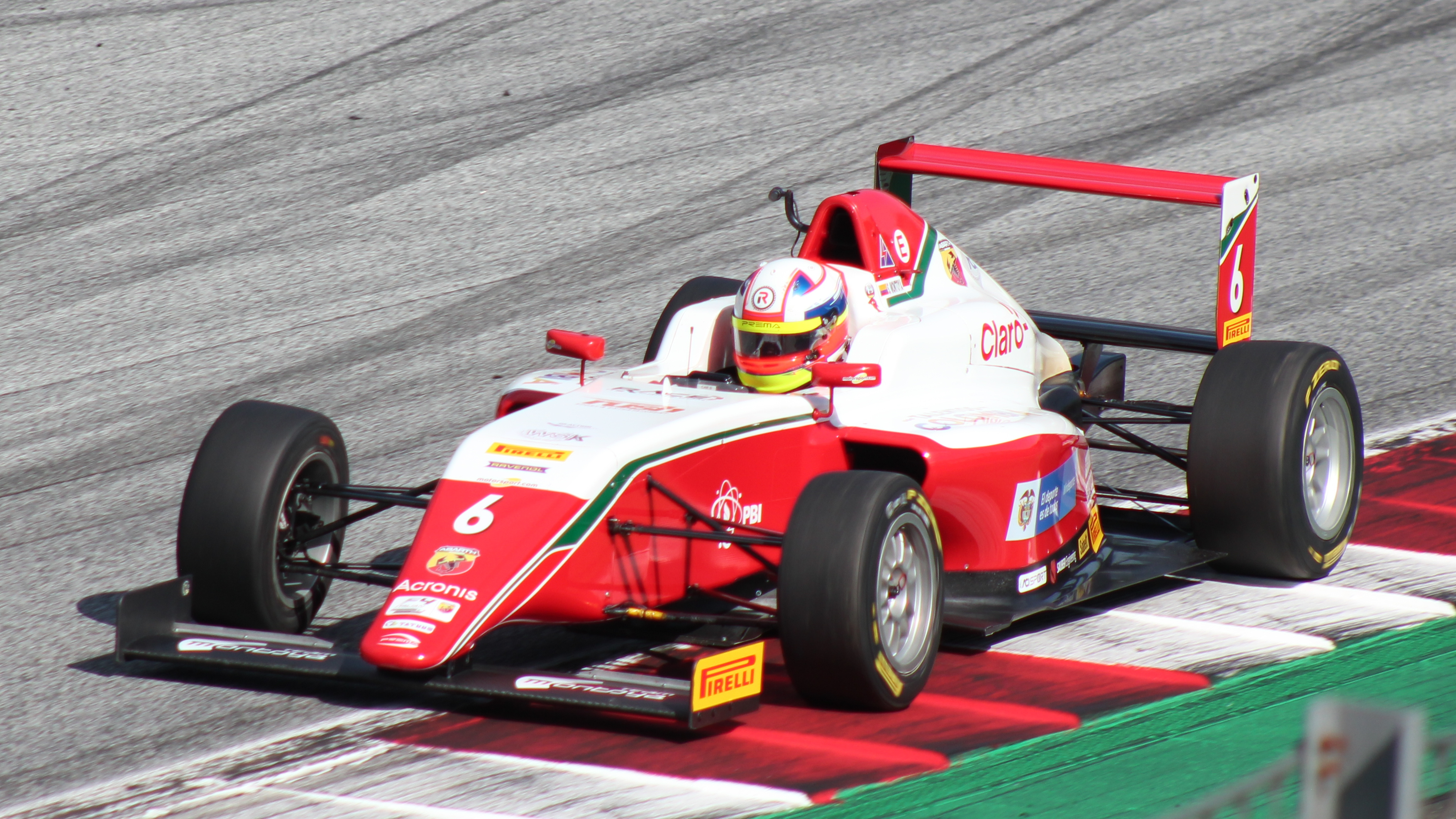
Montoya racing in the 2021 Italian F4 Championship at the Red Bull Ring

==== 2020 ====
In 2020, Montoya made his single-seater debut with Prema Powerteam, racing full-time in the Italian F4 Championship and competing in two rounds of the ADAC F4 Championship. Unfortunately for Montoya, he was unable to score any podiums throughout the year, and finished eleventh in his main campaign, behind his three teammates Gabriele Minì, Dino Beganovic and Gabriel Bortoleto.

==== 2021 ====
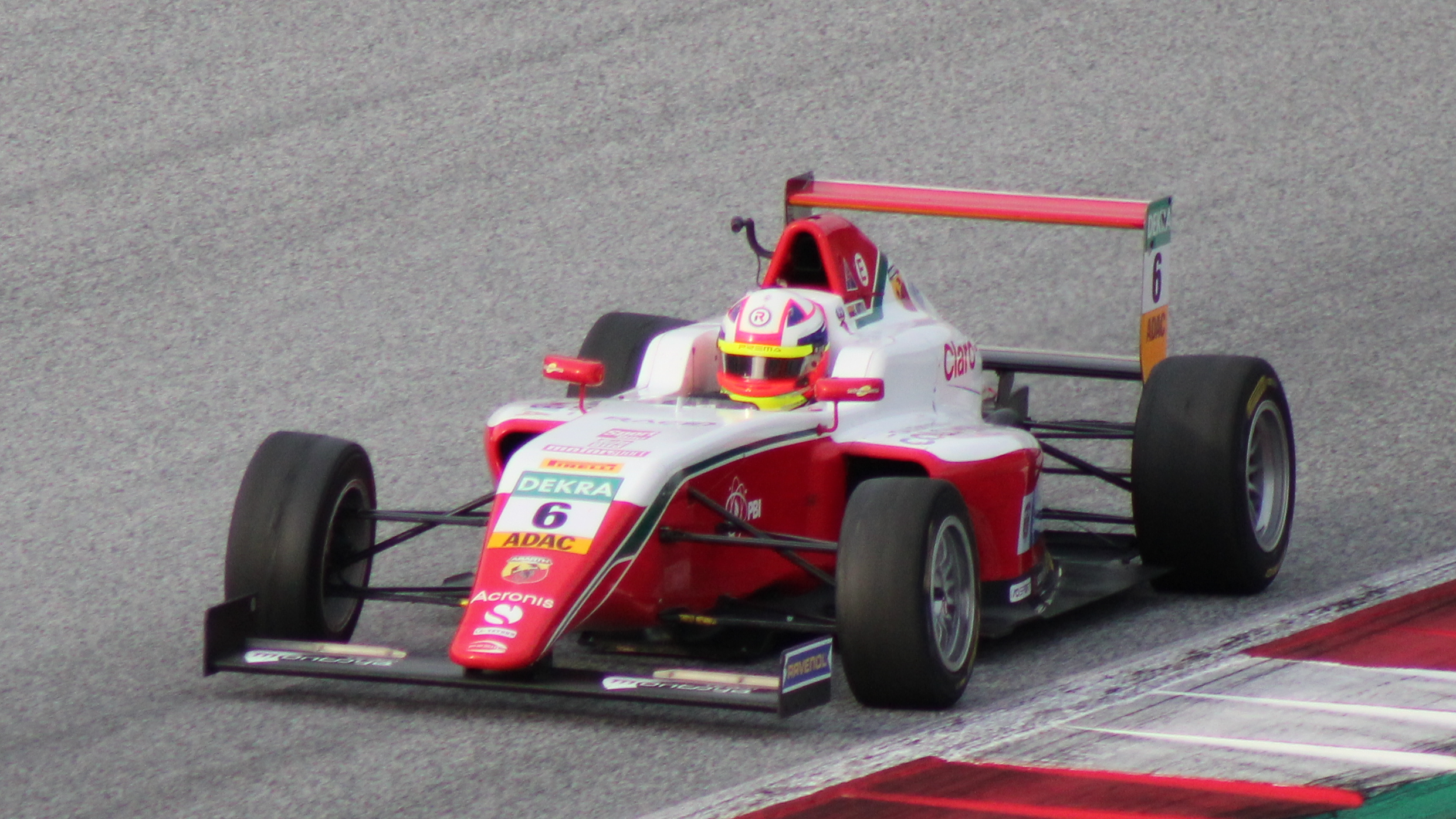
Montoya racing in the 2021 ADAC Formula 4 Championship

Montoya re-signed with Prema for the 2021 season, returning to the Italian and German F4 series. He would run a part-time campaign in the latter, finishing second thrice in the six races he competed in, putting him ninth in the standings, ahead of three full-time competitors. Montoya's Italian campaign would be just as fruitful: netting nine podiums but no wins, Montoya finished fourth at the end of the year, being narrowly beaten by teammate Kirill Smal due to a spin in safety car conditions at the final race of the season in Monza.

=== Formula Regional ===
==== 2022 ====
At the start of 2022 Montoya made his debut in the Formula Regional Asian Championship with Mumbai Falcons India Racing. After scoring pole position for the first race, Montoya scored his first car racing win of his career in a lights-to-flag victory. Montoya took his second win during the third round at the Dubai Autodrome, also from pole position. He was ultimately unable to finish the season, but ended the championship in seventh place with 92 points.

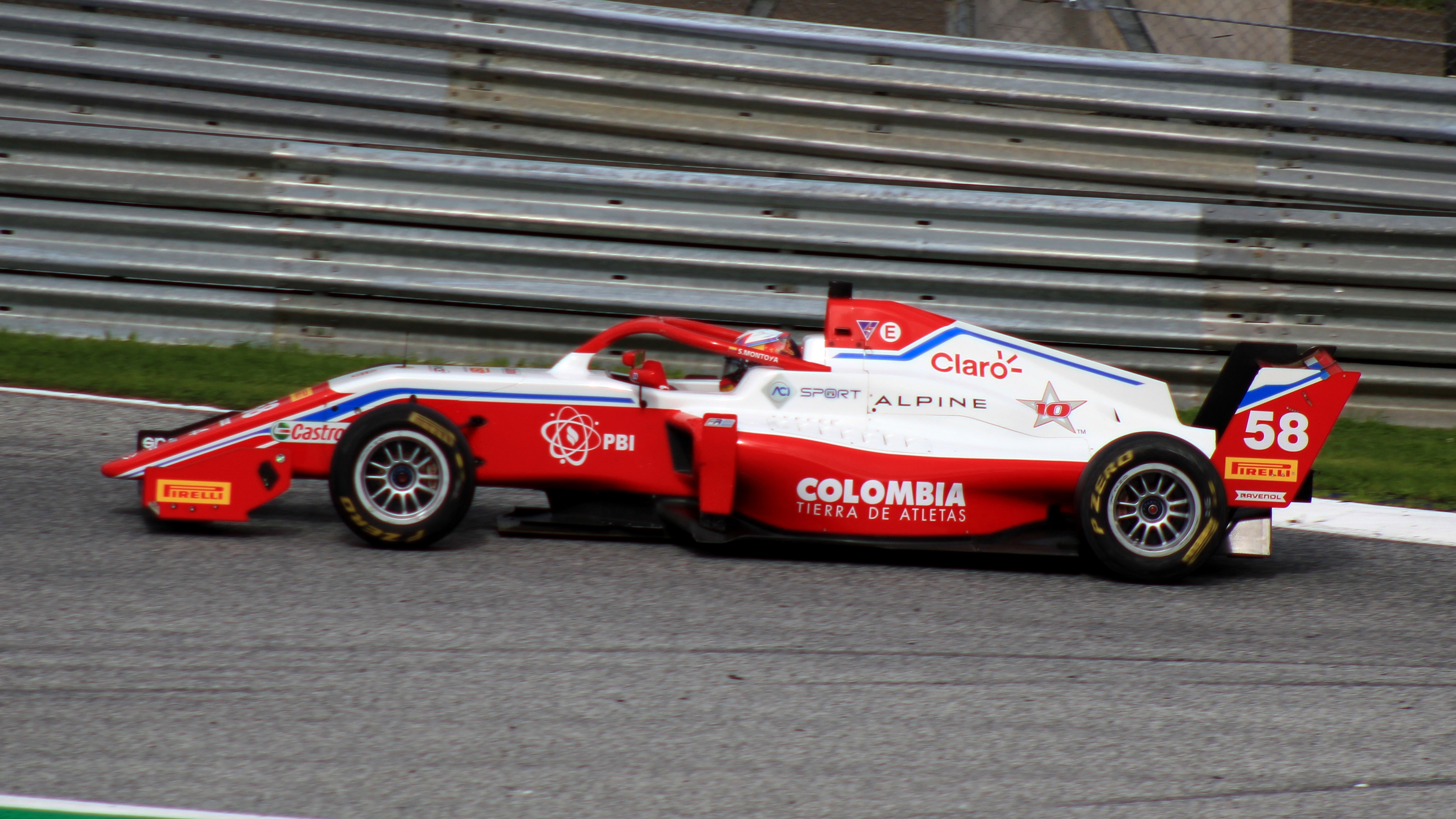
Montoya racing in the 2022 Formula Regional European Championship at the Red Bull Ring.

Montoya moved up to the 2022 Formula Regional European Championship with Prema Racing. Montoya started his season strongly, taking two eighth places and a fourth place in the opening three races. Just before his weekend at Spa-Francorchamps, Montoya announced that he had started receiving backing and sponsorship from Red Bull, marking him as a Red Bull athlete. However, he failed to score a single point during the final eight races and finished 13th in the standings with 44 points.

==== 2023 ====
At the start of 2023, Montoya competed the full season in the 2023 Formula Regional Middle East Championship with Hitech Grand Prix. Montoya finished the season 21st in the standings, scoring only two points finishes.

=== FIA Formula 3 Championship ===
==== 2022 ====
Due to Oliver Goethe's Euroformula Open commitments, Montoya replaced him and made his first F3 appearance in Zandvoort, driving for Campos Racing whilst Hunter Yeany recovered from a wrist injury. Following free practice in which he ended 17th, Montoya stated that "the car is a massive step" and "it's been quite good though." He qualified seventh as a red flag thwarted his rivals attempts to improve their lap times. Montoya finished both races in eighth place, being the only one in the Campos team to score points during the weekend. Montoya was ranked 21st in the final standings classification.

In late September, Montoya partook in the post-season test that year with Hitech Grand Prix at Jerez.

==== 2023 ====
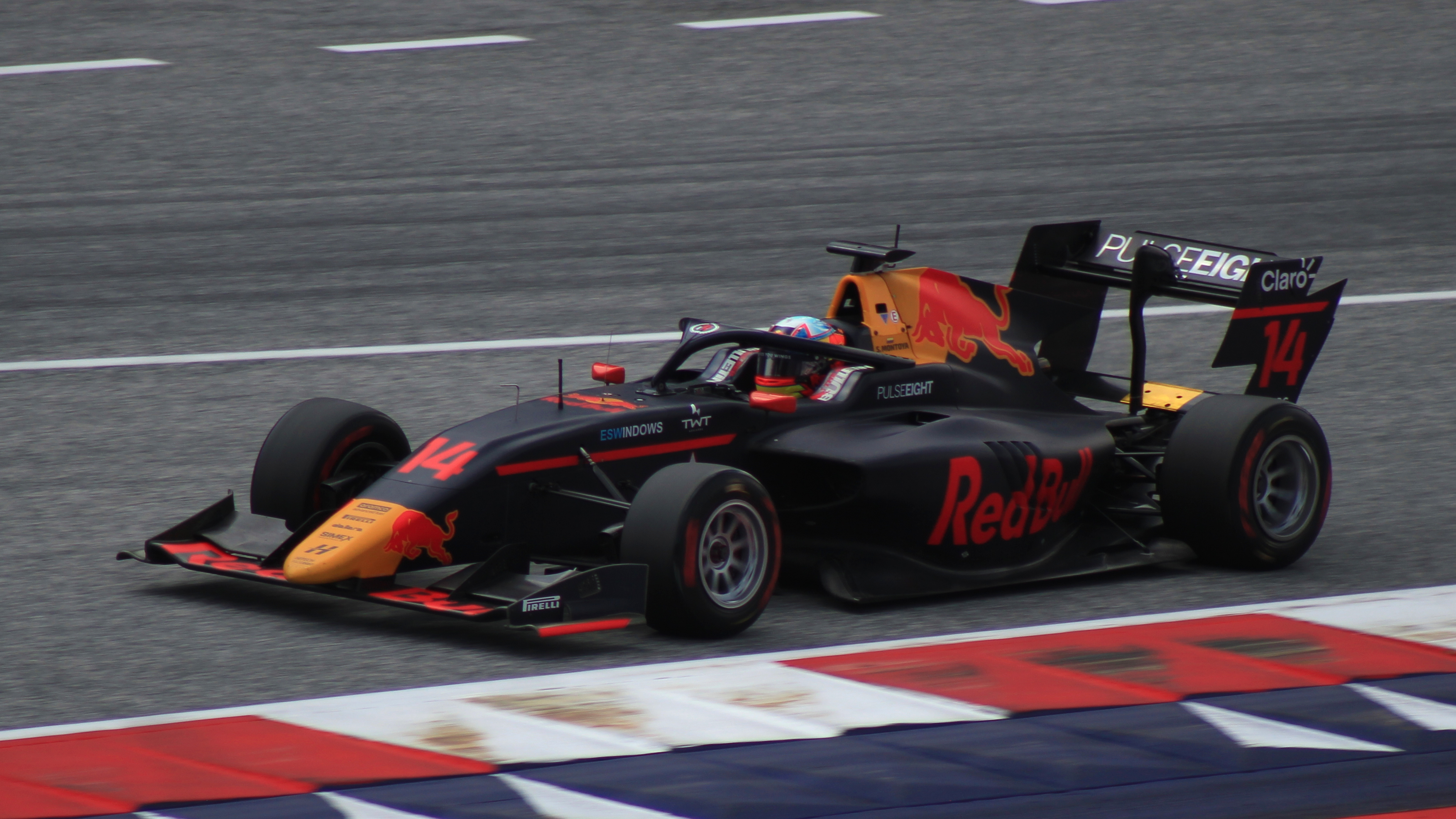
Montoya driving the Dallara F3 2019 during the 2023 Spielberg Formula 3 round.

In January 2023, Montoya was announced as a Hitech Pulse-Eight driver for the 2023 FIA Formula 3 Championship. The season opener in Bahrain proved successful, advancing to tenth in the sprint race from 14th. He continued to score points in the feature race, securing ninth place. In Melbourne, Montoya qualified on reverse pole in 12th. He would finish in third after losing the lead to Franco Colapinto and Zak O'Sullivan, but it was his maiden podium in F3. However, race winner Colapinto was disqualified post-race, promoted Montoya to second place. In the feature race, he was involved in a race-ending collision with Nikola Tsolov, where the Colombian's suspension broke upon contact. In Monaco, Montoya showed promising pace, qualifying sixth and ending seventh in the sprint race. The feature race looked set for another good result, when fighting over fifth place with Caio Collet, he made contact and damaged his front wing. Montoya would be penalised for the incident and was later disqualified post-race after a left tyre was found to have been used on the wrong side during his pit stop.

In Barcelona, Montoya fought with Paul Aron for fourth until they made contact, the former coming out with a puncture and dropping to the back of the field, and was later given a penalty for failing to follow race director's instructions, which was to go on the left of the bollards. He made up for lost points during the feature race, by finishing seventh. In Austria, after finishing ninth in the sprint, Montoya charged up from 15th to contend for a podium position. On the final lap, Montoya tried to snatch third place from Colapinto, but collided with him instead and fell to tenth before being further penalised for that incident. In Silverstone, Montoya led the race early on from reverse pole for the first 13 laps, and was hit from behind by Taylor Barnard following the safety car restart, which dropped him out of the top-ten. He eventually crossed the line in eighth place. He finished to eleventh place in the feature race, before benefitting two positions from Collet and Tommy Smith's penalties to move into tenth place.

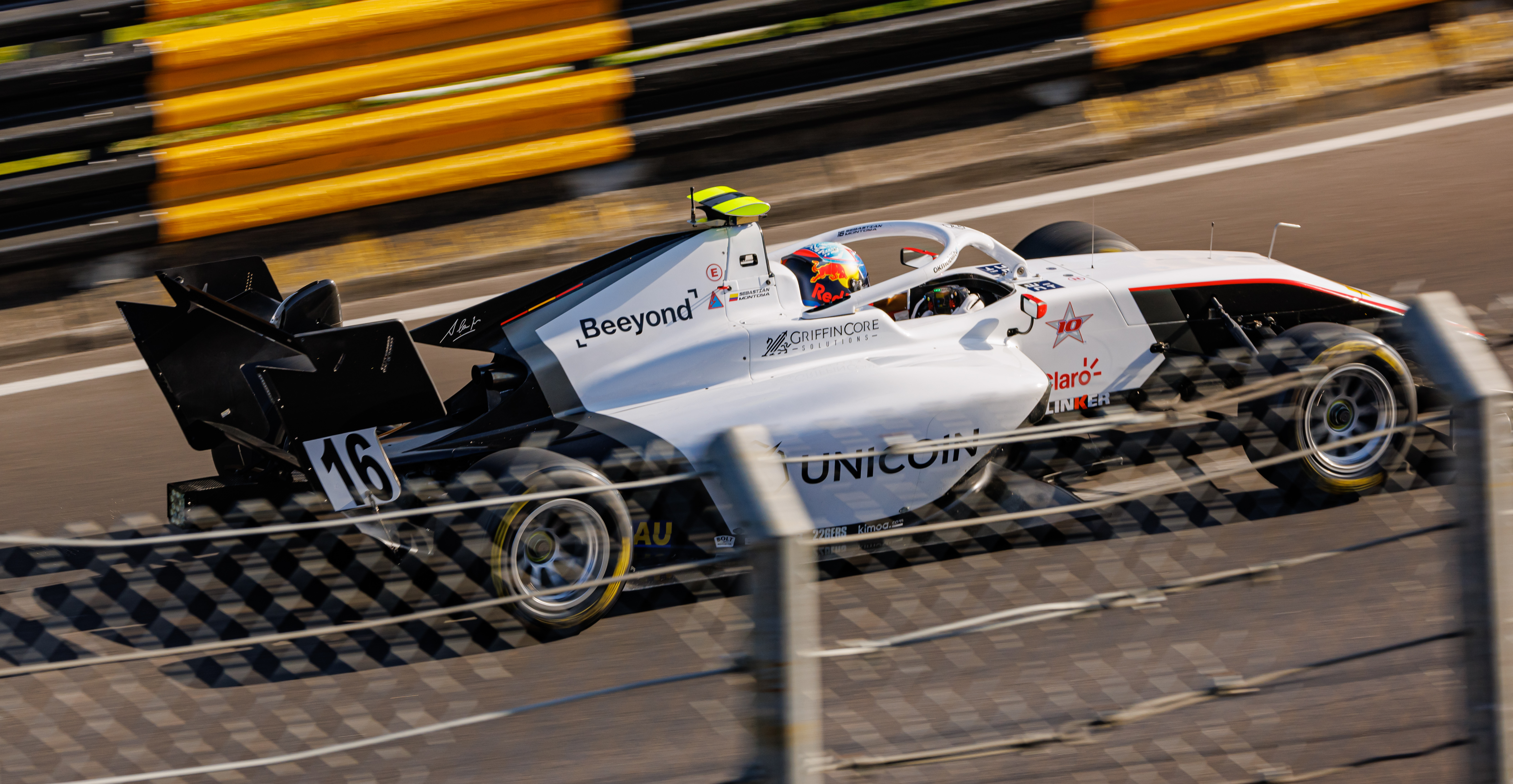
Montoya racing at the 2023 Macau Grand Prix with Campos Racing

Hungary was the first weekend where he failed to score points, but rebounded in Spa-Francorchamps with sixth place in the feature race, having started on the correct wet tyres on a damp track. In Monza, he ended his season in disappointment after being punted into the gravel and was out. Overall, Montoya ended the season in a disappointing 16th place in the standings, with 37 points. During the post-season test, he tested for Campos Racing for the Jerez. He then took part in the Macau Grand Prix for the team, but was unable to make the start and finished the race a few laps down.

==== 2024 ====
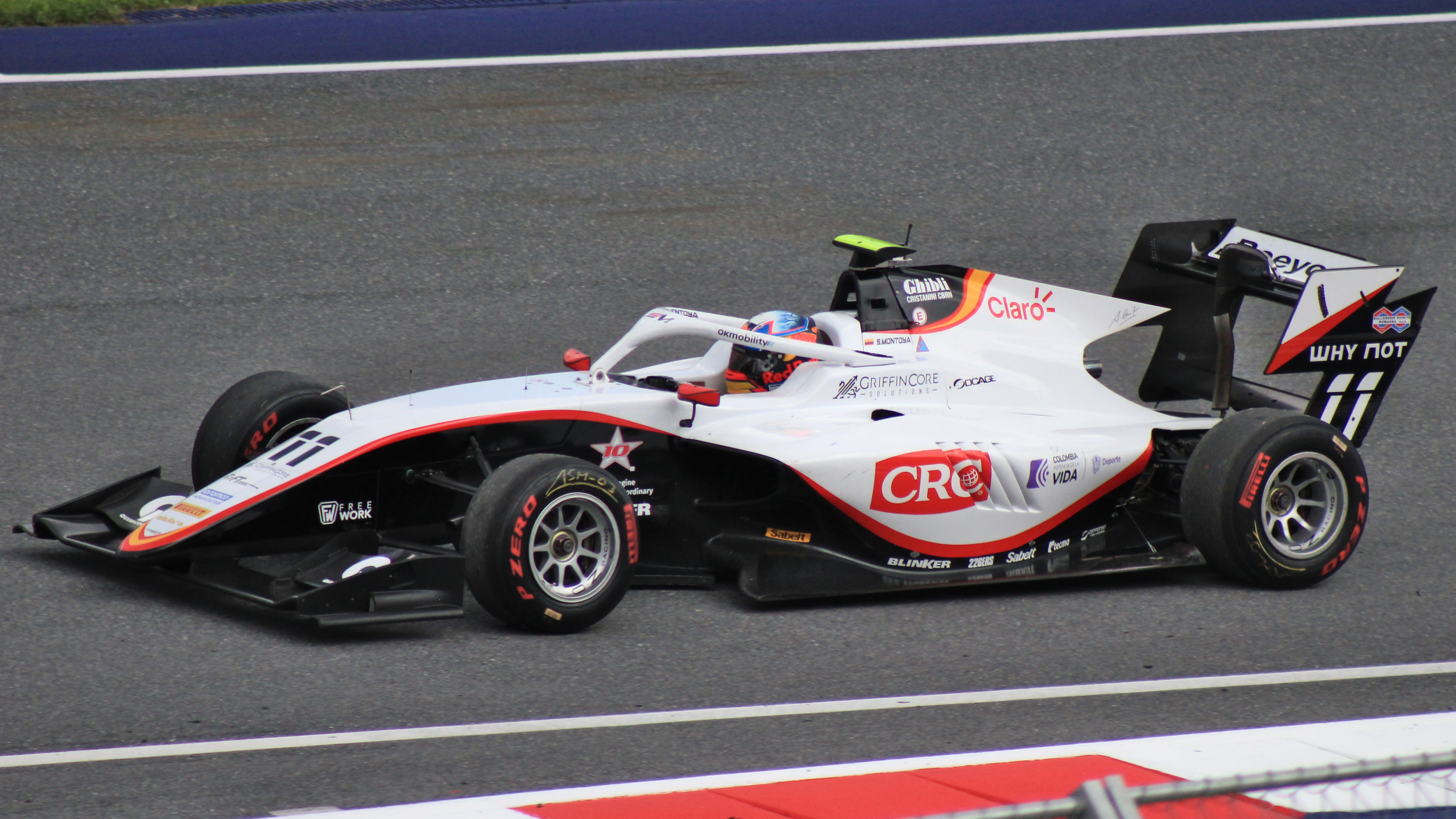
Montoya driving for Campos Racing during the 2024 Spielberg Formula 3 round

Montoya reunited with Campos Racing for the 2024 season, where he partners Mari Boya and fellow Red Bull junior Oliver Goethe. Failing to score points in Bahrain after qualifying 29th due to ill health, but earned his first points of the season with a charge to eighth from 15th in the sprint race. He made an even bigger comeback on Sunday, finishing in sixth place. Another comeback came in the Imola feature race, where Montoya charged from 23rd all the way to tenth. Montoya qualified in the top-ten for the first time in Barcelona, but had his lap time deleted and was relegated to 27th. He made comebacks in both races, finishing 12th in the feature but collided with Gabriele Minì in the earlier sprint which took both out. A strong qualifying followed with eighth in Austria, but had a heavy crash during the sprint race after making contact with Alex Dunne. His miserable weekend continued as Tim Tramnitz hit him from behind early on, causing Montoya to retire.

In Silverstone, Montoya qualified 17th, but again made one of his customary comebacks to finish seventh. In the feature race, Montoya was unlucky to be a victim of a collision from a spinning Joshua Dufek. He earned his best F3 qualifying result in Spa-Francorchamps securing fourth. In the sprint race, Montoya fought multiple battles and finished eighth, but was promoted to fifth following post-race penalties. A strong start in the feature race moved him to second, but was ultimately to challenge leader Callum Voisin and ultimately settled on taking his first podium of the year. Qualifying sixth for the Monza finale, Montoya fought hard with Santiago Ramos in the sprint to finish in second again. However, Montoya was penalised and demoted to 11th due to forcing Ramos off-track. Contact with teammate Boya deprived Montoya of points in the feature race. The Colombian finished the year 17th in the standings, scoring 40 points.

=== FIA Formula 2 Championship ===
==== 2025 ====
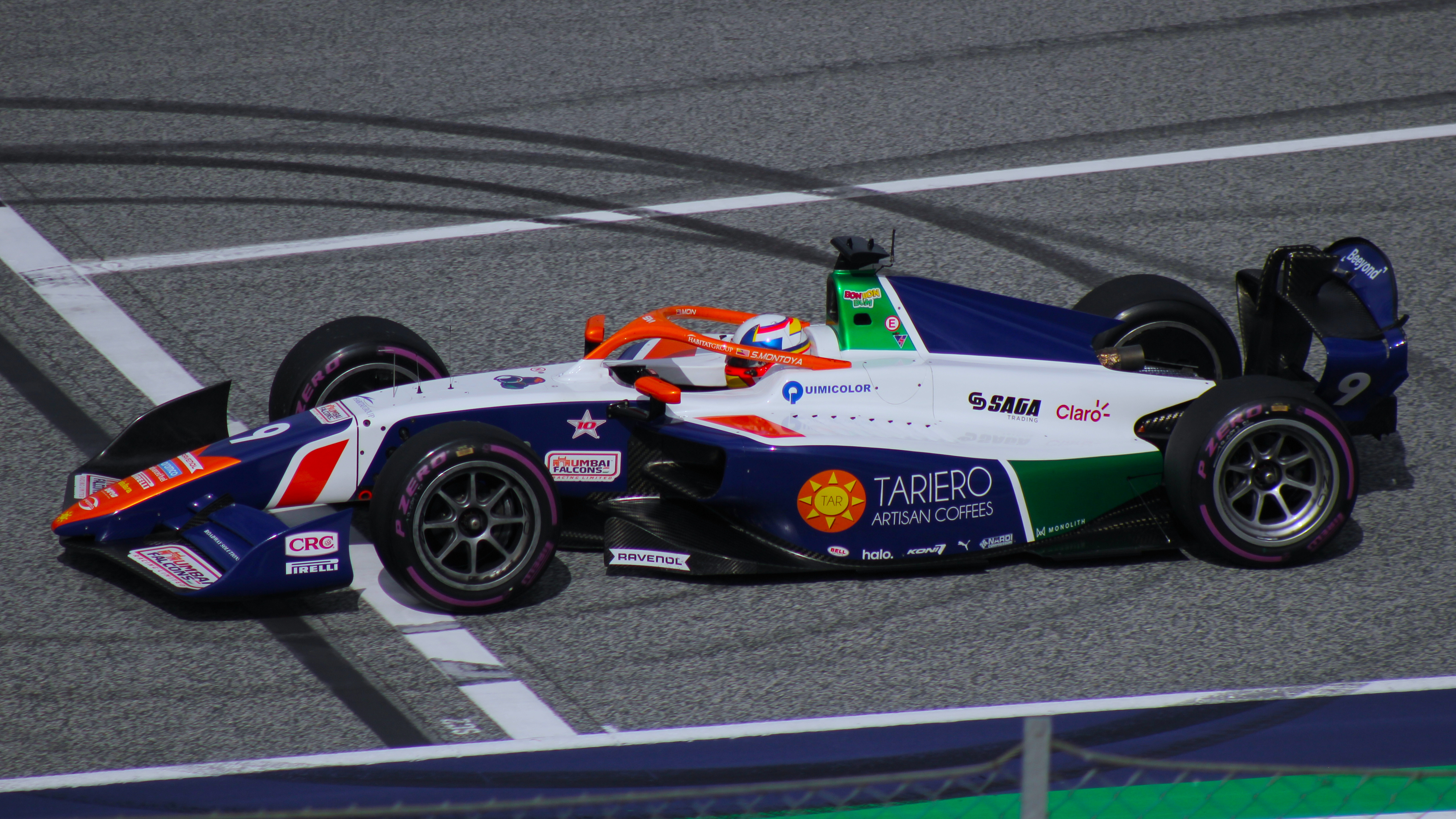
Montoya driving the Dallara F2 2024 during the 2025 Spielberg Formula 2 round

In December 2024, it was announced that Montoya would be promoted to Formula 2 with Prema Racing, partnering his former Formula 3 teammate Gabriele Minì. He began the season with points, making up places to finish in sixth place during the Melbourne sprint race. This was followed by two rounds with points owing to issues of his control, but surprised in Imola with a front row start. Unfortunately for Montoya, he stalled during the formation lap and was made to start from the pits, he was still able to recover and finish in eighth. Montoya finished sixth in the Monaco sprint and was set to start fifth on Sunday, but once again stalled during the formation lap. He took this setback to his advantage however, as he avoided a first lap carnage and eventually made his way to third, scoring his first F2 podium. He continued his momentum with another front row start during qualifying in Barcelona. He collided with teammate Minì in a tight battle and fell to the back, but utilised his new tyres after a pit stop to improve to fifth, only to penalised and dropped to eleventh due to the aforementioned collision. In the feature race, he maintained his position to secure his second successive podium.

Montoya qualified just outside the top-ten in Austria, but took advantage of a last lap collision ahead in the sprint, finishing in fifth. In the feature race, he fell back at the start following contact with a rival, but impressively charged forward to fourth place despite a bent steering wheel. He earned his third podium of the season during the Silverstone sprint race, having to pass Kush Maini mid-race for second. His positive weekend continued the next day, maintaining his position of fifth place in the feature race. Speaking about his good momentum, Montoya stated that a change in mentality made him "enjoy driving a lot more". However, his form dipped over the next few rounds, failing to score until the Monza feature race, coming back to ninth from 21st on the grid despite floor damage. In the Baku sprint race, Montoya was set for a return to the rostrum after a strong start saw him up to second, but car overheating from debris slowed him with three laps to go and he dropped out of the points. He finished tenth the next day after being compromised by a double stack in the pits.

In Qatar, Montoya secured fourth in the sprint after Nikola Tsolov ahead was pushed wide on the last lap, and followed it up with fifth in the feature race. Despite qualifying in the top-five in Abu Dhabi, he concluded the season on a disappointing note as a stall dropped him to the back during the sprint, while retired from the feature race due to a technical issue. Montoya finished twelfth in the drivers' standings with three podiums and 91 points, ahead of teammate Minì.

==== 2026 ====
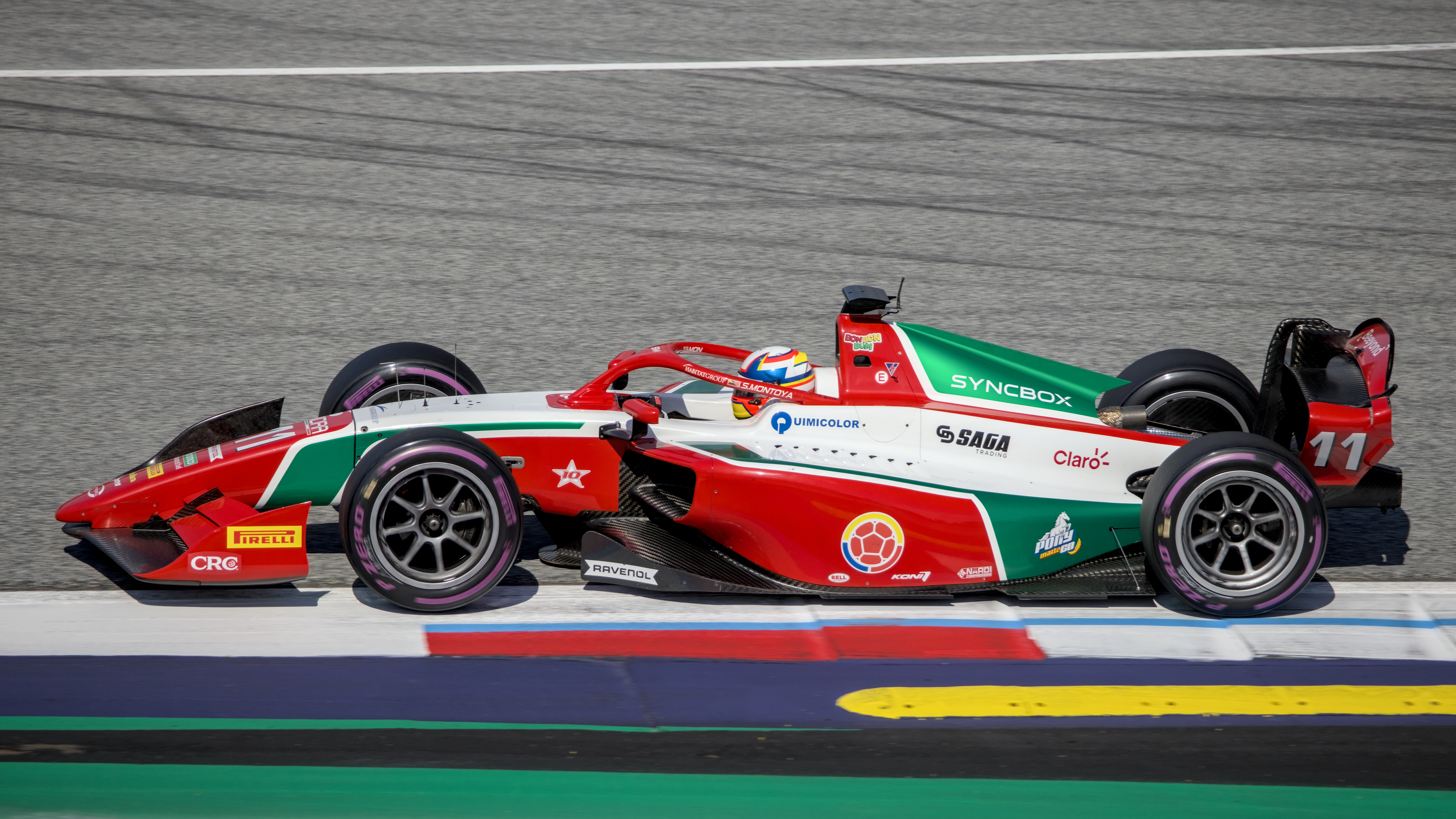
Montoya driving for Prema during the 2026 Spielberg Formula 2 round

Montoya continued with Prema for a second season in 2026, partnering Aston Martin junior Mari Boya.

==== 2027 ====
After two seasons at Prema, Montoya will switch to DAMS Lucas Oil for the 2027 season.

=== Formula One ===
Montoya was a member of the Red Bull Junior Team for the 2023 season.

In May 2025, Montoya was announced to join two-time Formula One champion Fernando Alonso's management team, A14 Management.

=== Endurance racing ===
==== 2022 ====
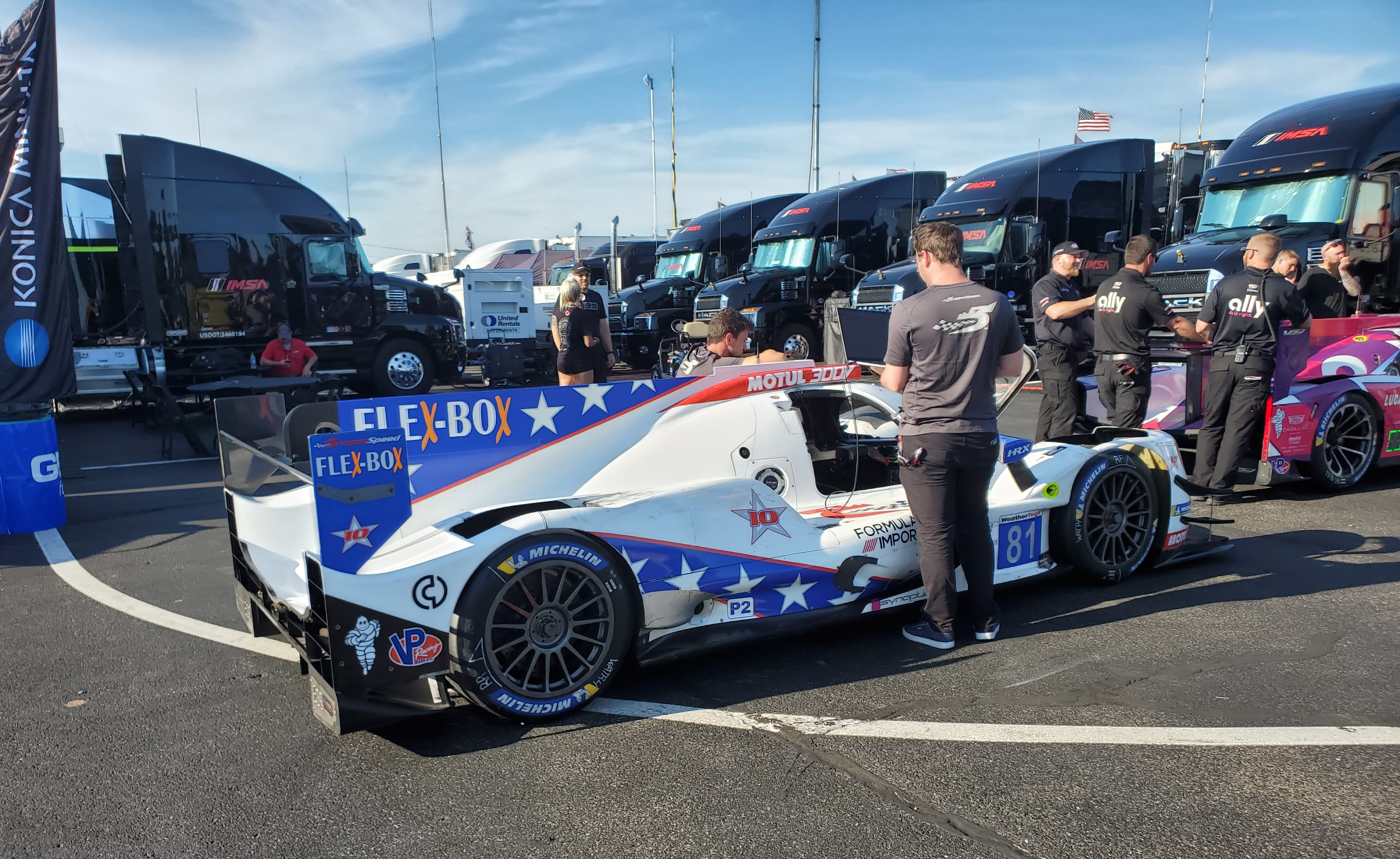
Montoya's car in the 2022 IMSA SportsCar Championship at Watkins Glen

Montoya tested an endurance racing car for the first time during the 2021 FIA World Endurance Championship rookie test.

Montoya made his endurance debut during the 2022 IMSA SportsCar Championship, partaking in selected rounds for DragonSpeed Racing alongside his father. He was initially supposed to partake in the 2022 24 Hours of Daytona during late January, but was scrapped due to his clashing commitments in the Formula Regional Asian Championship.

==== 2023 ====
Montoya competed in the 2023 European Le Mans Series, driving for DragonSpeed USA in the LMP2 category alongside his father again. He finished seventh in the standings.

== Personal life ==
Montoya's father is Juan Pablo Montoya, a seven-time Formula One Grand Prix winner, former NASCAR driver, IndyCar series champion and two time winner of the Indianapolis 500.

== Karting record ==
=== Karting career summary ===
Season	Series	Team	Position
2013	Florida Winter Tour — Rotax Micro Max		24th
2014	Florida Winter Tour — AM Racing Kart Formula TaG Cadet		18th
2014	Florida Winter Tour — Rotax Micro Max	AM	7th
2015	Florida Winter Tour — Rotax Micro Max		5th
2015	Florida Winter Tour — Mini ROK		9th
2016	Florida Winter Tour — Rotax Mini Max		5th
2016	Florida Winter Tour — Mini ROK		8th
2016	Rotax Max Challenge Colombia — Mini Max		13th
2016	SKUSA SuperNationals XX — Mini Swift	Team Montoya	14th
2016	ROK Cup International Final — Mini ROK	Birel Art Racing	28th
2017	SKUSA SuperNationals XXI — X30 Junior class	Team Montoya	5th
2017	Florida Winter Tour — Junior ROK		9th
2017	CIK-FIA European Championship — OKJ		55th
2018	AMR Motorplex Karting Challenge — TaG Junior		9th
2018	Florida Winter Tour — Junior ROK		30th
2018	WSK Super Master Series — OKJ		20th
2018	ROK the Rio — Junior ROK	Team Montoya	1st
2018	SKUSA SuperNationals XXII — X30 Junior class	Team Montoya	11th
2018	CIK-FIA European Junior Championship — OKJ	Tony Kart Racing Team	43rd
2018	CIK-FIA Karting World Championship — Junior	Tony Kart Racing Team	30th
2018	23° South Garda Winter Cup — OKJ	Tony Kart Racing Team	28th
2019	ROK the Rio — Senior ROK	Team Montoya	32nd
2019	Florida Winter Tour — Senior ROK	Team Montoya	33rd
2019	CIK-FIA Karting European Championship — OK	Tony Kart Racing Team	24th
2019	FIA Karting World Championship — OK	Tony Kart Racing Team	28th
2019	WSK Euro Series — OK	Tony Kart Racing Team	31st
2019	WSK Super Master Series — OK	Tony Kart Racing Team	18th
2019	24° South Garda Winter Cup — OK	Tony Kart Racing Team	31st
2020	Florida Winter Tour — Shifter ROK	Team Montoya	20th
2020	SKUSA Winter Series — X30 Senior		—

== Racing record ==
=== Racing career summary ===
Season	Series	Team	Races	Wins	Poles	F/Laps	Podiums	Points	Position
2020	ADAC Formula 4 Championship	Prema Powerteam	6	0	0	0	0	10	17th
2020	Italian F4 Championship	Prema Powerteam	20	0	0	0	0	81	11th
2021	ADAC Formula 4 Championship	Prema Powerteam	6	0	0	2	3	72	9th
2021	Italian F4 Championship	Prema Powerteam	21	0	2	4	9	194	4th
2022	Formula Regional Asian Championship	Mumbai Falcons India Racing	9	2	3	2	3	92	7th
2022	Formula Regional European Championship	Prema Racing	20	0	0	0	0	44	13th
2022	IMSA SportsCar Championship - LMP2	DragonSpeed - 10 Star	3	0	0	0	1	893	13th
2022	FIA Formula 3 Championship	Campos Racing	2	0	0	0	0	7	21st
2023	FIA Formula 3 Championship	Hitech Pulse-Eight	18	0	0	0	1	37	16th
2023	Formula Regional Middle East Championship	Hitech Grand Prix	15	0	0	0	0	12	21st
2023	European Le Mans Series - LMP2 Pro-Am	DragonSpeed USA	6	0	0	1	0	44	7th
2023	Macau Grand Prix	Campos Racing	1	0	0	0	0	N/A	NC
2024	FIA Formula 3 Championship	Campos Racing	20	0	0	0	1	40	17th
2025	FIA Formula 2 Championship	Prema Racing	27	0	0	2	3	91	12th
2026	FIA Formula 2 Championship	Prema Racing	25	0	0	0	0	30	17th*
2027	FIA Formula 2 Championship	DAMS Lucas Oil	0	0	0	0	0	0	TBD

* Season still in progress.

=== Complete ADAC Formula 4 Championship results ===
(key) (Races in bold indicate pole position) (Races in italics indicate fastest lap)

Year	Entrant	1	2	3	4	5	6	7	8	9	10	11	12	13	14	15	16	17	18	19	20	21	Pos	Points
2020	Prema Powerteam	LAU1; 1	LAU1; 2	LAU1; 3	NÜR1; 1; 8	NÜR1; 2; 8	NÜR1; 3; 11	HOC; 1; 13	HOC; 2 Ret	HOC; 3; 9	NÜR2; 1	NÜR2; 2	NÜR2; 3	RBR; 1	RBR; 2	RBR; 3	LAU2; 1	LAU2; 2	LAU2; 3	OSC; 1	OSC; 2	OSC; 3	17th	10
2021	Prema Powerteam	RBR; 1; 2	RBR; 2; 7	RBR; 3; 7	ZAN; 1; 2	ZAN; 2; 8	ZAN; 3; 2	NÜR; 1	NÜR; 2	NÜR; 3	HOC1; 1	HOC1; 2	HOC1; 3	SAC; 1	SAC; 2	SAC; 3	HOC2; 1	HOC2; 2	HOC2; 3				9th	72

=== Complete Italian F4 Championship results ===
(key) (Races in bold indicate pole position) (Races in italics indicate fastest lap)

Year	Entrant	1	2	3	4	5	6	7	8	9	10	11	12	13	14	15	16	17	18	19	20	21	Pos	Points
2020	Prema Powerteam	MIS; 1; 8	MIS; 2; 5	MIS; 3; 5	IMO1; 1 Ret	IMO1; 2; 14	IMO1; 3; 7	RBR; 1; 9	RBR; 2; 28	RBR; 3; 7	MUG; 1 Ret	MUG; 2; 10	MUG; 3; 7	MNZ; 1; 5	MNZ; 2; 8	MNZ; 3; 6	IMO2; 1; 6	IMO2; 2; 26†	IMO2; 3; 7	VLL; 1; 25	VLL; 2 C	VLL; 3; 13	11th	81
2021	Prema Powerteam	LEC; 1; 35†	LEC; 2; 4	LEC; 3; 5	MIS; 1; 6	MIS; 2; 2	MIS; 3; 3	VLL; 1; 2	**VLL**; **2** Ret	VLL; 3; 2	IMO; 1 Ret	IMO; 2; 8	IMO; 3; 3	**RBR**; **1**; 3	RBR; 2 Ret	RBR; 3 Ret	MUG; 1; 3	MUG; 2; 2	MUG; 3; 28	MNZ; 1; 5	MNZ; 2; 2	MNZ; 3 Ret	4th	194

=== Complete Formula Regional Asian Championship results ===
(key) (Races in bold indicate pole position) (Races in italics indicate fastest lap)

Year	Entrant	1	2	3	4	5	6	7	8	9	10	11	12	13	14	15	Pos	Points
2022	Mumbai Falcons India Racing	**ABU**; **1**; 1	ABU; 2; 4	ABU; 3; 10	**DUB**; **1**; 3	DUB; 2 Ret	DUB; 3; 19	**DUB**; **1**; 1	DUB; 2; 9	DUB; 3; 4	DUB; 1	DUB; 2	DUB; 3	ABU; 1	ABU; 2	ABU; 3	7th	92

=== Complete IMSA SportsCar Championship results ===
(key) (Races in bold indicate pole position; results in italics indicate fastest lap)

Year	Entrant	Class	Make	Engine	1	2	3	4	5	6	7	Pos	Points
2022	DragonSpeed - 10 Star	LMP2	Oreca 07	Gibson GK428 V8	DAY	SEB; 8	LGA	MDO	WGL; 5	ELK	PET; 2	13th	893

=== Complete Formula Regional European Championship results ===
(key) (Races in bold indicate pole position) (Races in italics indicate fastest lap)

Year	Entrant	1	2	3	4	5	6	7	8	9	10	11	12	13	14	15	16	17	18	19	20	Pos	Points
2022	Prema Racing	MNZ; 1; 8	MNZ; 2; 8	IMO; 1; 4	IMO; 2 Ret	MCO; 1; 17	MCO; 2; 14	LEC; 1; 11	LEC; 2; 11	ZAN; 1; 6	ZAN; 2; 4	HUN; 1; 16	HUN; 2; 8	SPA; 1; 16	SPA; 2; 13	RBR; 1; 32	RBR; 2; 17	CAT; 1; 13	CAT; 2; 15	MUG; 1; 12	MUG; 2; 20	13th	44

=== Complete FIA Formula 3 Championship results ===
(key) (Races in bold indicate pole position; races in italics indicate points for the fastest lap of the top-10 finishers)

Year	Entrant	1	2	3	4	5	6	7	8	9	10	11	12	13	14	15	16	17	18	19	20	Pos	Points
2022	Campos Racing	BHR; SPR	BHR; FEA	IMO; SPR	IMO; FEA	CAT; SPR	CAT; FEA	SIL; SPR	SIL; FEA	RBR; SPR	RBR; FEA	HUN; SPR	HUN; FEA	SPA; SPR	SPA; FEA	ZAN; SPR; 8	ZAN; FEA; 8	MNZ; SPR	MNZ; FEA			21st	7
2023	Hitech Pulse-Eight	BHR; SPR; 10	BHR; FEA; 9	MEL; SPR; 2	MEL; FEA; Ret	MON; SPR; 7	MON; FEA; DSQ	CAT; SPR; 26	CAT; FEA; 7	RBR; SPR; 9	RBR; FEA; 20	SIL; SPR; 8	SIL; FEA; 10	HUN; SPR; Ret	HUN; FEA; 24	SPA; SPR; Ret	SPA; FEA; 6	MNZ; SPR; 12	MNZ; FEA; Ret			16th	37
2024	Campos Racing	BHR; SPR; 18	BHR; FEA; 17	MEL; SPR; 8	MEL; FEA; 6	IMO; SPR; 25	IMO; FEA; 10	MON; SPR; 18	MON; FEA; 15	CAT; SPR; Ret	CAT; FEA; 12	RBR; SPR; Ret	RBR; FEA; Ret	SIL; SPR; 7	SIL; FEA; Ret	HUN; SPR; 19	HUN; FEA; 19	SPA; SPR; 5	SPA; FEA; 2	MNZ; SPR; 11	MNZ; FEA; 21	17th	40

=== Complete Formula Regional Middle East Championship results ===
(key) (Races in bold indicate pole position) (Races in italics indicate fastest lap)

Year	Entrant	1	2	3	4	5	6	7	8	9	10	11	12	13	14	15	Pos	Points
2023	Hitech Grand Prix	DUB1; 1; 15	DUB1; 2; 17	DUB1; 3; 18	KUW1; 1 Ret	KUW1; 2 Ret	KUW1; 3; 16	KUW2; 1; 12	KUW2; 2; 6	KUW2; 3; 13	DUB2; 1; 14	DUB2; 2; 8	DUB2; 3; 12	ABU; 1; 12	ABU; 2; 16	ABU; 3; 21†	21st	12

=== Complete European Le Mans Series results ===
(key) (Races in bold indicate pole position; results in italics indicate fastest lap)

Year	Entrant	Class	Chassis	Engine	1	2	3	4	5	6	Rank	Points
2023	DragonSpeed USA	LMP2 Pro-Am	Oreca 07	Gibson GK428 4.2 L V8	CAT; 7	LEC; 7	ARA; 7	SPA; 7	ALG; 5	ALG; 5	7th	44

=== Complete Macau Grand Prix results ===
Year	Team	Car	Qualifying	Quali Race	Main race
2023	(Spain) Campos Racing	Dallara F3 2019	23rd	18th	NC†

=== Complete FIA Formula 2 Championship results ===
(key) (Races in bold indicate pole position; races in italics indicate points for the fastest lap of the top-10 finishers))

Year	Entrant	1	2	3	4	5	6	7	8	9	10	11	12	13	14	15	16	17	18	19	20	21	22	23	24	25	26	27	28	29	DC	Points
2025	Prema Racing	MEL; SPR; 6	MEL; FEA; C	BHR; SPR; Ret	BHR; FEA; 19	JED; SPR; 13	JED; FEA; Ret	IMO; SPR; 9	IMO; FEA; 8	MON; SPR; 6	MON; FEA; 3	CAT; SPR; 11	CAT; FEA; 2	RBR; SPR; 5	RBR; FEA; 4	SIL; SPR; 2	SIL; FEA; 5	SPA; SPR; 15	SPA; FEA; 21†	HUN; SPR; Ret	HUN; FEA; 15	MNZ; SPR; 10	MNZ; FEA; 9	BAK; SPR; 15	BAK; FEA; 9	LSL; SPR; 4	LSL; FEA; 5	YMC; SPR; 12	YMC; FEA; Ret		12th	91
2026	Prema Racing	MEL; SPR; 9	MEL; FEA; 9	MIA; SPR; 16	MIA; FEA; 9	MTL; SPR; 17†	MTL; FEA; 4	MON; SPR; 13	MON; FEA; 8	CAT; SPR; 10	CAT; FEA; 16	RBR; SPR; 2	RBR; FEA; Ret	SIL; SPR; Ret	SIL; FEA; Ret	SPA; SPR; 9	SPA; FEA; 11	HUN; SPR; Ret	HUN; FEA; 16	MNZ; SPR; 14	MNZ; FEA; 18	MAD; SPR; 17	MAD; FEA; 13	BAK; SPR; 7	BAK; FEA1; DNS	BAK; FEA2; 17	LSL; SPR	LSL; FEA	YMC; SPR	YMC; FEA	17th*	30*
2027	DAMS Lucas Oil	BHR; SPR	BHR; FEA	JED; SPR	JED; FEA	MEL; SPR	MEL; FEA	MTL; SPR	MTL; FEA	MON; SPR	MON; FEA	SIL; SPR	SIL; FEA	RBR; SPR	RBR; FEA	MNZ; SPR	MNZ; FEA	MAD; SPR	MAD; FEA	BAK; SPR	BAK; FEA	IST; SPR	IST; FEA	MXC; SPR	MXC; FEA	LSL; SPR	LSL; FEA	YMC; SPR	YMC; FEA		TBD	TBD

* Season still in progress.
