= 2022 Formula Regional Asian Championship =

Motor racing competition

The 2022 Formula Regional Asian Championship was a multi-event, Formula Regional open-wheel single seater motor racing championship. The championship featured a mix of professional and amateur drivers, competing in Formula Regional cars. It was the fifth season of the championship, and the first season under the Formula Regional moniker, after a rebrand happened due to the FIA ending the F3 category name.

The season was held over five consecutive weekends in January and February 2022.

For the first time, the second race of a weekend was a reversed-grid race, reversing the top 10 finishers of race one.

Arthur Leclerc won the drivers' championship with two races to spare, while his team, Mumbai Falcons India Racing, won the teams' championship. Pepe Martí, second overall, won the Rookie Cup, and Khaled Al Qubaisi earned Masters Cup honors.

== Teams and drivers ==
Team	No.	Driver	Status	Rounds
(Australia) Evans GP	2	(Finland) Patrik Pasma		3–5
(Australia) Evans GP	12	(France) Sami Meguetounif	R	5
(Australia) Evans GP	14	(Italy) Nicola Marinangeli		All
(Australia) Evans GP	30	(Russia) Michael Belov		3–5
(Australia) Evans GP	74	(Turkey) Cem Bölükbaşı		1
(Australia) Evans GP	78	(United Kingdom) Frederick Lubin	R	1–3
(United Arab Emirates) Abu Dhabi Racing by Prema	3	(Estonia) Paul Aron		All
(United Arab Emirates) Abu Dhabi Racing by Prema	52	(United States) Jak Crawford		All
(United Arab Emirates) Abu Dhabi Racing by Prema	66	(United Arab Emirates) Khaled Al Qubaisi	M	All
(United Arab Emirates) Abu Dhabi Racing by Prema	88	(United Arab Emirates) Hamda Al Qubaisi	R	All
(United Arab Emirates) Abu Dhabi Racing by Prema	99	(United Arab Emirates) Amna Al Qubaisi		All
(United Kingdom) Hitech Grand Prix	4	(Italy) Gabriele Minì		1–2, 4–5
(United Kingdom) Hitech Grand Prix	5	(Italy) Leonardo Fornaroli	R	1–3
(United Kingdom) Hitech Grand Prix	6	(France) Isack Hadjar		All
(United Kingdom) Hitech Grand Prix	7	(Switzerland) Joshua Dufek	R	1–3
(United Kingdom) Hitech Grand Prix	7	(France) Vladislav Lomko (Note: Lomko is a Russian driver racing under a French licence.)	R	5
(United Kingdom) Hitech Grand Prix	92	(France) Owen Tangavelou	R	3–5
(Hong Kong) BlackArts Racing	9	(Hong Kong) Thomas Luedi (Note: Luedi is a Swiss-Chinese driver racing under a Hong Kong licence.)	M	All
(Hong Kong) BlackArts Racing	21	(Luxembourg) Brice Morabito	R	1
(Hong Kong) BlackArts Racing	26	(Israel) Ido Cohen		1
(Hong Kong) BlackArts Racing	26	(France) Pierre-Louis Chovet		2–5
(Hong Kong) BlackArts Racing	36	(Israel) Ido Cohen		4–5
Mumbai Falcons India Racing	10	(Sweden) Dino Beganovic		All
Mumbai Falcons India Racing	28	(Monaco) Arthur Leclerc		All
Mumbai Falcons India Racing	37	(United Kingdom) Oliver Bearman	R	4–5
Mumbai Falcons India Racing	46	(Colombia) Sebastián Montoya	R	1–3
(Australia) Evans GP Academy	11	(Hungary) Levente Révész	R	All
(Australia) Evans GP Academy	77	(United States) David Morales	R	All
(United Arab Emirates) 3Y by R-ace GP	15	(Monaco) Oliver Goethe (Note: Goethe is a Danish-German driver racing under a Monégasque licence.)		All
(United Arab Emirates) 3Y by R-ace GP	16	(Spain) Lorenzo Fluxá		All
(United Arab Emirates) 3Y by R-ace GP	17	(France) Hadrien David		1–2
(United Arab Emirates) 3Y by R-ace GP	17	(Switzerland) Léna Bühler		4–5
(United Arab Emirates) 3Y by R-ace GP	18	(Brazil) Gabriel Bortoleto		1–2
(United Arab Emirates) 3Y by R-ace GP	18	(Italy) Francesco Braschi	R	3–5
(Republic of Ireland) Pinnacle Motorsport	23	(Spain) Pepe Martí	R	All
(Republic of Ireland) Pinnacle Motorsport	27	(Netherlands) Dilano van 't Hoff	R	All
(Republic of Ireland) Pinnacle Motorsport	34	(Turkey) Salih Yoluç	M	All
(Republic of Ireland) Pinnacle Motorsport	55	(Philippines) Ayato Iwasaki (Note: Iwasaki is a Japanese driver racing under a Philippine licence.)	R	All

Icon	Status
R	Rookie
M	Master
G	Guest drivers ineligible for points

- Esteban Masson was scheduled to compete for BlackArts Racing, but did not appear in any rounds.

== Race calendar ==
The first proposal for the race calendar was announced on 21 September 2021. As the COVID-19 pandemic meant that most parts of Asia still were under heavy restrictions, the calendar only consisted of races in the United Arab Emirates for the second year in a row.

Round		Circuit	Date	Supporting	Map of circuit locations
1	R1	Yas Marina Circuit (Grand Prix Circuit)	22 January	6 Hours of Abu Dhabi; Gulf Radical Cup	2022 Formula Regional Asian Championship is located in United Arab Emirates
1	R2	Yas Marina Circuit (Grand Prix Circuit)	23 January	6 Hours of Abu Dhabi; Gulf Radical Cup	2022 Formula Regional Asian Championship is located in United Arab Emirates
1	R3	Yas Marina Circuit (Grand Prix Circuit)	23 January	6 Hours of Abu Dhabi; Gulf Radical Cup	2022 Formula Regional Asian Championship is located in United Arab Emirates
2	R1	Dubai Autodrome (International Circuit)	29 January	UAE Touring Car Championship	2022 Formula Regional Asian Championship is located in United Arab Emirates
2	R2	Dubai Autodrome (International Circuit)	30 January	UAE Touring Car Championship	2022 Formula Regional Asian Championship is located in United Arab Emirates
2	R3	Dubai Autodrome (International Circuit)	30 January	UAE Touring Car Championship	2022 Formula Regional Asian Championship is located in United Arab Emirates
3	R1	Dubai Autodrome (Grand Prix Circuit)	5 February	Gulf Radical Cup; UAE Touring Car Championship	2022 Formula Regional Asian Championship is located in United Arab Emirates
3	R2	Dubai Autodrome (Grand Prix Circuit)	6 February	Gulf Radical Cup; UAE Touring Car Championship	2022 Formula Regional Asian Championship is located in United Arab Emirates
3	R3	Dubai Autodrome (Grand Prix Circuit)	6 February	Gulf Radical Cup; UAE Touring Car Championship	2022 Formula Regional Asian Championship is located in United Arab Emirates
4	R1	Dubai Autodrome (Grand Prix Circuit)	12 February	Asian Le Mans Series	2022 Formula Regional Asian Championship is located in United Arab Emirates
4	R2	Dubai Autodrome (Grand Prix Circuit)	13 February	Asian Le Mans Series	2022 Formula Regional Asian Championship is located in United Arab Emirates
4	R3	Dubai Autodrome (Grand Prix Circuit)	13 February	Asian Le Mans Series	2022 Formula Regional Asian Championship is located in United Arab Emirates
5	R1	Yas Marina Circuit (Grand Prix Circuit)	19 February	Asian Le Mans Series	2022 Formula Regional Asian Championship is located in United Arab Emirates
5	R2	Yas Marina Circuit (Grand Prix Circuit)	19 February	Asian Le Mans Series	2022 Formula Regional Asian Championship is located in United Arab Emirates
5	R3	Yas Marina Circuit (Grand Prix Circuit)	20 February	Asian Le Mans Series	2022 Formula Regional Asian Championship is located in United Arab Emirates

== Race results ==
Round		Circuit	Pole position	Fastest lap	Winning driver	Winning team	Rookie Winner
1	R1	Yas Marina Circuit (Grand Prix Circuit)	(Colombia) Sebastián Montoya	(France) Hadrien David	(Colombia) Sebastián Montoya	Mumbai Falcons India Racing	(Colombia) Sebastián Montoya
1	R2	Yas Marina Circuit (Grand Prix Circuit)		(France) Isack Hadjar	(Brazil) Gabriel Bortoleto	(United Arab Emirates) 3Y by R-ace GP	(Colombia) Sebastián Montoya
1	R3	Yas Marina Circuit (Grand Prix Circuit)	(Italy) Gabriele Minì	(Spain) Pepe Martí	(Italy) Gabriele Minì	(United Kingdom) Hitech Grand Prix	(Spain) Pepe Martí
2	R1	Dubai Autodrome (International Circuit)	(Colombia) Sebastián Montoya	(France) Hadrien David	(France) Hadrien David	(United Arab Emirates) 3Y by R-ace GP	(Spain) Pepe Martí
2	R2	Dubai Autodrome (International Circuit)		(France) Hadrien David	(Monaco) Arthur Leclerc	Mumbai Falcons India Racing	(Spain) Pepe Martí
2	R3	Dubai Autodrome (International Circuit)	(France) Hadrien David	(Spain) Pepe Martí	(France) Hadrien David	(United Arab Emirates) 3Y by R-ace GP	(Spain) Pepe Martí
3	R1	Dubai Autodrome (Grand Prix Circuit)	(Colombia) Sebastián Montoya	(Colombia) Sebastián Montoya	(Colombia) Sebastián Montoya	Mumbai Falcons India Racing	(Colombia) Sebastián Montoya
3	R2	Dubai Autodrome (Grand Prix Circuit)		(Sweden) Dino Beganovic	(Sweden) Dino Beganovic	Mumbai Falcons India Racing	(Spain) Pepe Martí
3	R3	Dubai Autodrome (Grand Prix Circuit)	(Netherlands) Dilano van 't Hoff	(Colombia) Sebastián Montoya	(Monaco) Arthur Leclerc	Mumbai Falcons India Racing	(Spain) Pepe Martí
4	R1	Dubai Autodrome (Grand Prix Circuit)	(Estonia) Paul Aron	(Estonia) Paul Aron	(France) Isack Hadjar	(United Kingdom) Hitech Grand Prix	(Spain) Pepe Martí
4	R2	Dubai Autodrome (Grand Prix Circuit)		(United States) Jak Crawford	(Finland) Patrik Pasma	(Australia) Evans GP	(United Kingdom) Oliver Bearman
4	R3	Dubai Autodrome (Grand Prix Circuit)	(Estonia) Paul Aron	(Sweden) Dino Beganovic	(Monaco) Arthur Leclerc	Mumbai Falcons India Racing	(Spain) Pepe Martí
5	R1	Yas Marina Circuit (Grand Prix Circuit)	(Monaco) Arthur Leclerc	(Monaco) Arthur Leclerc	(Monaco) Arthur Leclerc	Mumbai Falcons India Racing	(United Kingdom) Oliver Bearman
5	R2	Yas Marina Circuit (Grand Prix Circuit)		(France) Isack Hadjar	(Italy) Gabriele Minì	(United Kingdom) Hitech Grand Prix	(Spain) Pepe Martí
5	R3	Yas Marina Circuit (Grand Prix Circuit)	(France) Isack Hadjar	(Italy) Gabriele Minì	(France) Isack Hadjar	(United Kingdom) Hitech Grand Prix	(Spain) Pepe Martí

== Season report ==
The season started off at Yas Marina Circuit in Abu Dhabi, with Sebastian Montoya and Gabriele Mini sharing poles in qualifying. Montoya won the opening race, while multiple collisions behind him forced the race to end under the safety car. The second race was won by Gabriel Bortoleto, his maiden win in the FR category, remaining largely unchallenged as his biggest on-track rival, Isack Hadjar, retired halfway through the race. Race three saw a big crash at the start as Cem Bölükbaşı stalled on the grid and was hit by two other drivers, a collision heavy enough that the lengthy subsequent repairs on his car saw him withdraw from the championship. Gabriele Mini won the race, followed home by Jak Crawford and Hadjar. At the end of the first round, Mini led the standings by three points over Arthur Leclerc, with Montoya in third.

As the championship headed into its three-round Dubai leg, Montoya took pole again, this time sharing the achievement with Hadrien David. The latter overtook the former on lap three of the first race and then led home in a race where championship leader Mini had to retire late on due to a mechanical failure. The reverse-grid race two not only gave Leclerc his first win of the season as he passed polesitter Pierre-Louis Chovet, he also took the points lead to which he held on until the very end. Hadrien David won again in the third race of the weekend, his last race of the season as the Frenchman left the championship following round two. Poor results meant Mini dropped out of the championship top three, while leader Leclerc was nine and twelve points clear respectively of French duo David and Hadjar.

The circuit configuration was changed for the fourth round, but Montoya still prevailed in qualifying, accompanied by Dilano van 't Hoff. Montoya converted his race one pole into a win once again, heading a Mumbai Falcons 1-2-3 in a red-flagged race due to Francesco Braschi's engine blowing up halfway through. In race two, Dino Beganovic overtook four cars at the start and three more later to win from eighth place on the grid. Van 't Hoff wasn't able to hold on to his pole position, relinquishing the lead of the race to Pepe Martí, who was then overtaken for the win by Leclerc. The Monegasque now had a 35-point advantage over second-placed Martí, with Montoya in third, a further four points behind.

The fourth round of the championship saw multiple changes in the driver lineup, as many drivers elected to only take part in three rounds to keep their rookie status for championships in the same category later in the year. Estonian driver Paul Aron took double pole for the third and last Dubai event, but it was Hadjar who took the first race win, after the pair battled all race long. Braschi started from reverse grid pole in race two, but was passed at the start by Patrik Pasma. Jak Crawford overtook Oliver Bearman, who made his debut in round 4, in the last corner of the last lap, finishing in second place by a tenth of a second. Leclerc once again extended his championship lead after taking race three victory from Aron, he was 40 points ahead of Martí and Hadjar heading into the last round.

The championship returned to Abu Dhabi for its season finale, with Leclerc converting his race one pole into a dominant victory, claiming the drivers' championship in the process as Martí, the only other driver still in contention, had a horrible race and finished in 12th after dropping back to 23rd at one point. The penultimate race of the season was a chaotic one, with Mini taking a closely-fought win over Beganovic. Hadjar and Mini ended the championship with a Hitech 1-2 in the final race.

== Championship standings ==
=== Scoring system ===
Points were awarded to the top ten drivers.

Position	**1st**	**2nd**	**3rd**	**4th**	**5th**	**6th**	**7th**	**8th**	**9th**	**10th**
Points	25	18	15	12	10	8	6	4	2	1

=== Drivers' Championship ===
Pos	Driver	ABU1 (United Arab Emirates)			DUB1 (United Arab Emirates)			DUB2 (United Arab Emirates)			DUB3 (United Arab Emirates)			ABU2 (United Arab Emirates)			Pts
Pos	Driver	R1	R2	R3	R1	R2	R3	R1	R2	R3	R1	R2	R3	R1	R2	R3	Pts
1	(Monaco) Arthur Leclerc	3	3	5	9	1	7	2	3	1	4	5	1	**1**	3	12	218
2	(Spain) Pepe Martí	Ret	Ret	4	2	7	2	4	4	2	3	4	3	12	4	6	158
3	(France) Isack Hadjar	4	16†	3	8	3	3	5	11	Ret	1	11	10	4	25	**1**	134
4	(Italy) Gabriele Minì	2	Ret	**1**	Ret	13	4				5	7	4	8	1	2	130
5	(Sweden) Dino Beganovic	5	Ret	11	5	2	5	3	1	15	Ret	14	27†	2	2	7	130
6	(United States) Jak Crawford	11	7	2	4	9	6	12	7	12	6	2	6	3	Ret	4	113
7	(Colombia) Sebastián Montoya	**1**	4	10	**3**	Ret	19	**1**	9	4							92
8	(Estonia) Paul Aron	Ret	15	7	15	10	23	6	14	Ret	**2**	8	**2**	5	Ret	3	80
9	(France) Hadrien David	Ret	Ret	9	1	4	**1**										64
10	(Spain) Lorenzo Fluxá	6	2	8	13	5	9	11	5	8	11	9	16	16	9	8	64
11	(Finland) Patrik Pasma							13	8	5	9	1	7	7	Ret	5	63
12	(Russia) Michael Belov							10	2	6	15	6	5	14	6	9	55
13	(Netherlands) Dilano van 't Hoff	DNS	DNS	DNS	7	Ret	24†	7	6	**3**	8	13	12	9	5	11	51
14	(Brazil) Gabriel Bortoleto	10	1	6	6	Ret	8										46
15	(United Kingdom) Oliver Bearman										7	3	24	6	Ret	23	29
16	(France) Pierre-Louis Chovet				10	6	12	8	12	7	12	10	11	10	8	10	26
17	(Italy) Leonardo Fornaroli	8	5	22†	11	8	11	9	26†	9							22
18	(Switzerland) Joshua Dufek	9	6	16	12	16	10	16	27†	10							12
19	(United Kingdom) Frederick Lubin	7	8	21	16	12	14	17	19	18							10
20	(France) Sami Meguetounif													13	7	22	6
21	(Israel) Ido Cohen	WD	WD	WD							25†	26†	8	27	11	15	4
22	(Italy) Francesco Braschi							Ret	15	14	10	19	9	11	23	19	3
23	(Hungary) Levente Révész	13	9	12	18	14	13	15	13	Ret	18	21	17	20	14	14	2
24	(Italy) Nicola Marinangeli	Ret	Ret	13	14	11	15	14	10	11	14	17	13	Ret	13	16	1
25	(Germany) Oliver Goethe	Ret	14	18	19	DNS	DNS	23	18	13	13	12	14	17	10	17	1
26	(United Arab Emirates) Amna Al Qubaisi	14	10	Ret	Ret	19	17	21	21	DNS	20	20	20	Ret	18	Ret	1
27	(Philippines) Ayato Iwasaki	15	11	15	21	18	18	19	25	17	22	16	23	19	16	20	0
28	(United Arab Emirates) Hamda Al Qubaisi	12	Ret	14	20	17	16	18	16	16	17	Ret	18	18	17	21	0
29	(Switzerland) Léna Bühler										26†	18	15	15	12	Ret	0
30	(Luxembourg) Brice Morabito	18	12	17													0
31	(France) Owen Tangavelou							20	17	20	16	15	25	23	20	13	0
32	(Hong Kong) Thomas Lüdi	19	13	20	24†	22	22	26†	24	22	24	22	22	26	24	25	0
33	(United States) David Morales	20†	17†	Ret	17	15	Ret	24	20	19	19	25	19	22	19	18	0
34	(France) Vladislav Lomko													21	15	26	0
35	(United Arab Emirates) Khaled Al Qubaisi	16	Ret	19	22	20	20	22	23	23	23	23	21	24	22	Ret	0
36	(Turkey) Salih Yoluç	17	Ret	Ret	23	21	21	25	22	21	21	24	26†	25	21	24	0
—	(Turkey) Cem Bölükbaşı	Ret	Ret	Ret													—
Pos	Driver	R1	R2	R3	R1	R2	R3	R1	R2	R3	R1	R2	R3	R1	R2	R3	Pts
Pos	Driver	ABU1 (United Arab Emirates)			DUB1 (United Arab Emirates)			DUB2 (United Arab Emirates)			DUB3 (United Arab Emirates)			ABU2 (United Arab Emirates)			Pts

Colour	Result
Gold	Winner
Silver	Second place
Bronze	Third place
Green	Points classification
Blue	Non-points classification
Blue	Non-classified finish (NC)
Purple	Retired, not classified (Ret)
Red	Did not qualify (DNQ)
Red	Did not pre-qualify (DNPQ)
Black	Disqualified (DSQ)
White	Did not start (DNS)
White	Withdrew (WD)
White	Race cancelled (C)
Blank	Did not practice (DNP)
Blank	Did not arrive (DNA)
Blank	Excluded (EX)

**Bold** – Pole

Italics – Fastest Lap

=== Rookie Cup ===
Pos	Driver	ABU1 (United Arab Emirates)			DUB1 (United Arab Emirates)			DUB2 (United Arab Emirates)			DUB3 (United Arab Emirates)			ABU2 (United Arab Emirates)			Pts
Pos	Driver	R1	R2	R3	R1	R2	R3	R1	R2	R3	R1	R2	R3	R1	R2	R3	Pts
1	(Spain) Pepe Martí	Ret	Ret	4	2	7	2	4	4	2	3	4	3	12	4	6	298
2	(Netherlands) Dilano van 't Hoff	DNS	DNS	DNS	7	Ret	24†	7	6	3	8	13	12	9	5	11	167
3	(Colombia) Sebastián Montoya	1	4	10	3	Ret	19	1	9	4							145
4	(Hungary) Levente Révész	13	9	12	18	14	13	15	13	Ret	18	21	17	20	14	14	135
5	(Italy) Leonardo Fornaroli	8	5	22†	11	8	11	9	26†	9							104
6	(United Arab Emirates) Hamda Al Qubaisi	12	Ret	14	20	17	16	18	16	16	17	Ret	18	18	17	21	92
7	(Switzerland) Joshua Dufek	9	6	16	12	16	10	16	27†	10							89
8	(Italy) Francesco Braschi							Ret	15	14	10	19	9	11	23	19	80
9	(Philippines) Ayato Iwasaki	15	11	15	21	18	18	19	25	17	22	16	23	19	16	20	80
10	(United Kingdom) Frederick Lubin	7	8	21	16	12	14	17	19	18							79
11	(United Kingdom) Oliver Bearman										7	3	24	6	Ret	23	73
12	(United States) David Morales	20†	17†	Ret	17	15	Ret	24	20	19	19	25	19	22	19	18	56
13	(France) Owen Tangavelou							20	17	20	16	15	25	23	20	13	48
14	(France) Sami Meguetounif													13	7	22	27
15	(Luxembourg) Brice Morabito	18	12	17													16
16	(France) Vladislav Lomko													21	15	26	12
Pos	Driver	R1	R2	R3	R1	R2	R3	R1	R2	R3	R1	R2	R3	R1	R2	R3	Pts
Pos	Driver	ABU1 (United Arab Emirates)			DUB1 (United Arab Emirates)			DUB2 (United Arab Emirates)			DUB3 (United Arab Emirates)			ABU2 (United Arab Emirates)			Pts

=== Masters Cup ===
Pos	Driver	ABU1 (United Arab Emirates)			DUB1 (United Arab Emirates)			DUB2 (United Arab Emirates)			DUB3 (United Arab Emirates)			ABU2 (United Arab Emirates)			Pts
Pos	Driver	R1	R2	R3	R1	R2	R3	R1	R2	R3	R1	R2	R3	R1	R2	R3	Pts
1	(United Arab Emirates) Khaled Al Qubaisi	16	Ret	19	22	20	20	22	23	23	23	23	21	24	22	Ret	287
2	(Turkey) Salih Yoluç	17	Ret	Ret	23	21	21	25	22	21	21	24	26†	25	21	24	263
3	(Hong Kong) Thomas Lüdi	19	13	20	24†	22	22	26†	24	22	24	22	22	26	24	25	257
Pos	Driver	R1	R2	R3	R1	R2	R3	R1	R2	R3	R1	R2	R3	R1	R2	R3	Pts
Pos	Driver	ABU1 (United Arab Emirates)			DUB1 (United Arab Emirates)			DUB2 (United Arab Emirates)			DUB3 (United Arab Emirates)			ABU2 (United Arab Emirates)			Pts

=== Teams' Championship ===
Ahead of each event, the teams nominated two drivers that accumulate teams' points.

Pos	Team	Pts
1	Mumbai Falcons India Racing	348
2	(United Kingdom) Hitech Grand Prix	264
3	(Republic of Ireland) Pinnacle Motorsport	209
4	(United Arab Emirates) Abu Dhabi Racing by Prema	193
5	(United Arab Emirates) 3Y by R-ace GP	128
6	(Australia) Evans GP	118
7	(Hong Kong) BlackArts Racing	30
8	(Australia) Evans GP Academy	8
