= Pepe Martí =

Spanish racing driver (born 2005)

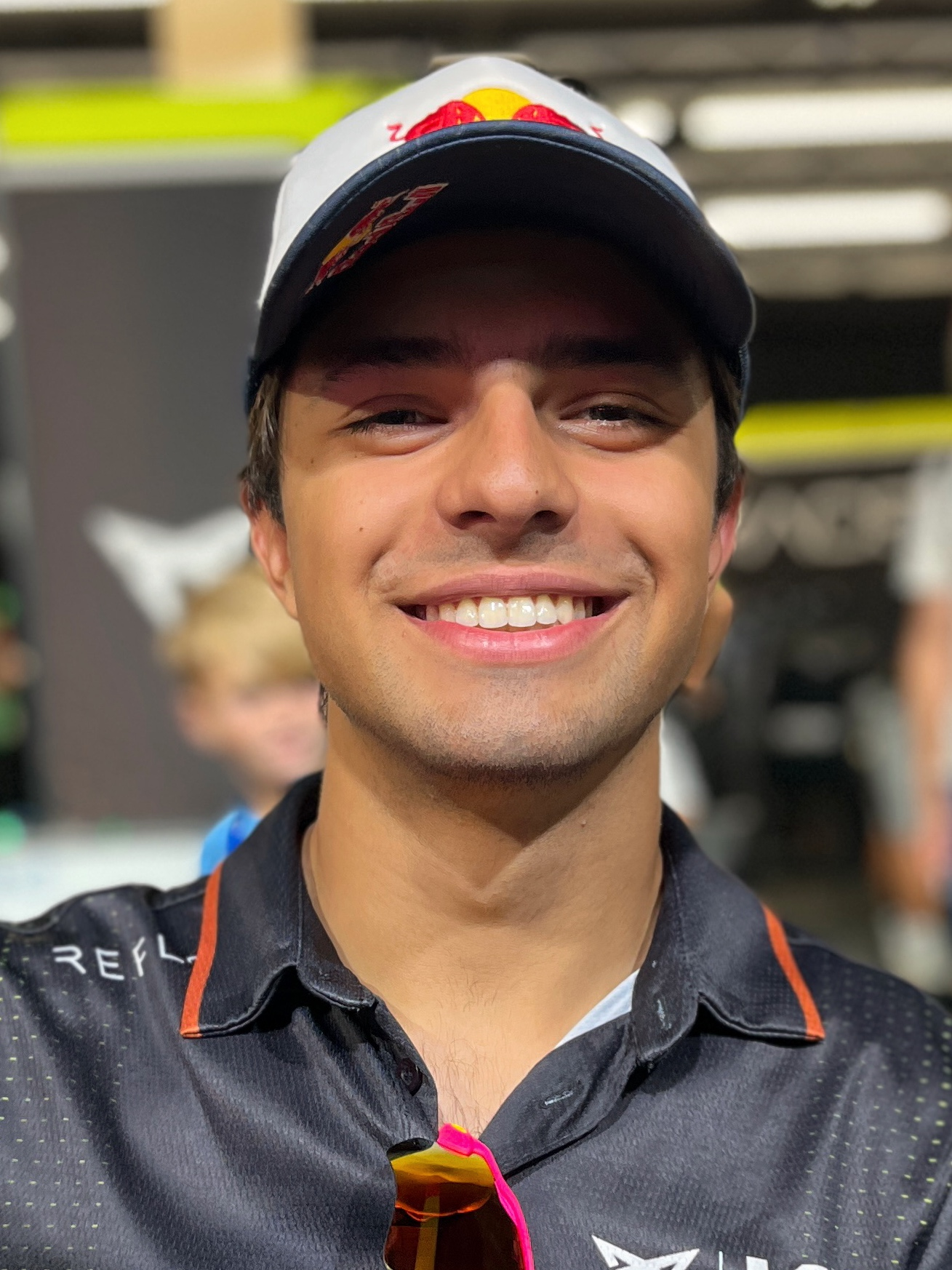
- Martí at the 2026 London ePrix
- Born: Josep Maria Martí Sobrepera; 13 June 2005 (age 21); Sabadell, Catalonia, Spain
- Nationality: (Spain) Spanish

Formula E career
- Debut season: 2025–26
- Current team: Cupra Kiro
- Car number: 3
- Starts: 17
- Wins: 0
- Podiums: 2
- Poles: 0
- Fastest laps: 1
- Best finish: 13th in 2025–26

Previous series
- 2024–2025; 2023; 2022–2023; 2022; 2021; 2021: FIA Formula 2; FR Middle East; FIA Formula 3; FR Asian; F4 Spanish; F4 UAE

Josep Maria "Pepe" Martí Sobrepera (Catalan: [ˈpepə məɾˈti], Spanish: [ˈpepe maɾˈti]; born 13 June 2005) is a Spanish racing driver who competes in Formula E for Cupra Kiro.

A member of the Red Bull Junior Team from 2023 to 2025, Martí competed in the FIA Formula 3 Championship for Campos, finishing fifth in the standings with three wins. He is a race winner in the UAE and Spanish Formula 4 championships, having placed third in the latter, as well as the 2022 Formula Regional Asian Championship runner-up. He moved to FIA Formula 2 in 2024 with Campos and earnt 4 wins over two years in the series before departing midway through the 2025 season to compete in Formula E.

== Junior racing career ==
=== Karting (2016–2020) ===
Martí started karting competitively in late 2016 at the age of eleven. In 2018 he was signed by Tony Kart, and the following year he won the Spanish Karting Championship in the Junior category, driving for Fernando Alonso's team. He then went on to finish seventh in the OK class of the CIK-FIA Karting World Championship in 2020, his last year of karting, with Kart Republic.

=== Formula 4 (2021) ===
Martí made his single-seater debut in January 2021, driving for Xcel Motorsport in the Formula 4 UAE Championship. He experienced a difficult debut, but was able to take his first podium during the second race in Yas Marina. After a second place in Dubai, he would then take his first single-seater victory during the second Yas Marina round. With one win and four podiums, Martí came seventh in the standings, 184 points behind champion Enzo Trulli.

For the main season, Martí competed in Spanish F4 with Campos Racing, as the Valencian team made its debut in the championship. Martí began with a podium during the opening Spa-Francorchamps round. However, he had to wait until the fourth round at the MotorLand Aragón to taste his first wins, in which he secured a double victory. Despite not winning any more races, Martí attained four more podiums in the remaining three rounds whilst being in a fight for runner-up spot with teammate Sebastian Øgaard; as he ultimately finished third in the standings with two wins and nine podiums.

=== Formula Regional (2022–2023) ===
==== 2022 ====
Martí started 2022 racing in the rebranded Formula Regional Asian Championship for Irish-Filipino team Pinnacle Motorsport, alongside Formula 4 rival Dilano van 't Hoff. Martí had a challenging start to the season with two retirements, but following that, he manage to notch five podiums and score consistently. Due to this, he finished the season with 158 points to claim second place in the overall standings, while also winning the rookie cup.

==== 2023 ====
During 2023 pre-season, Martí returned to the 2023 Formula Regional Middle East Championship with Pinnacle Van Amersfoort Racing. He had a decent start to the season with consistent points, before not partaking in the third round in Kuwait Motor Town. He then ended the season with two wins, placing him seventh in the standings with 79 points and was the highest driver to have missed one round.

=== FIA Formula 3 (2022–2023) ===
==== 2022 ====
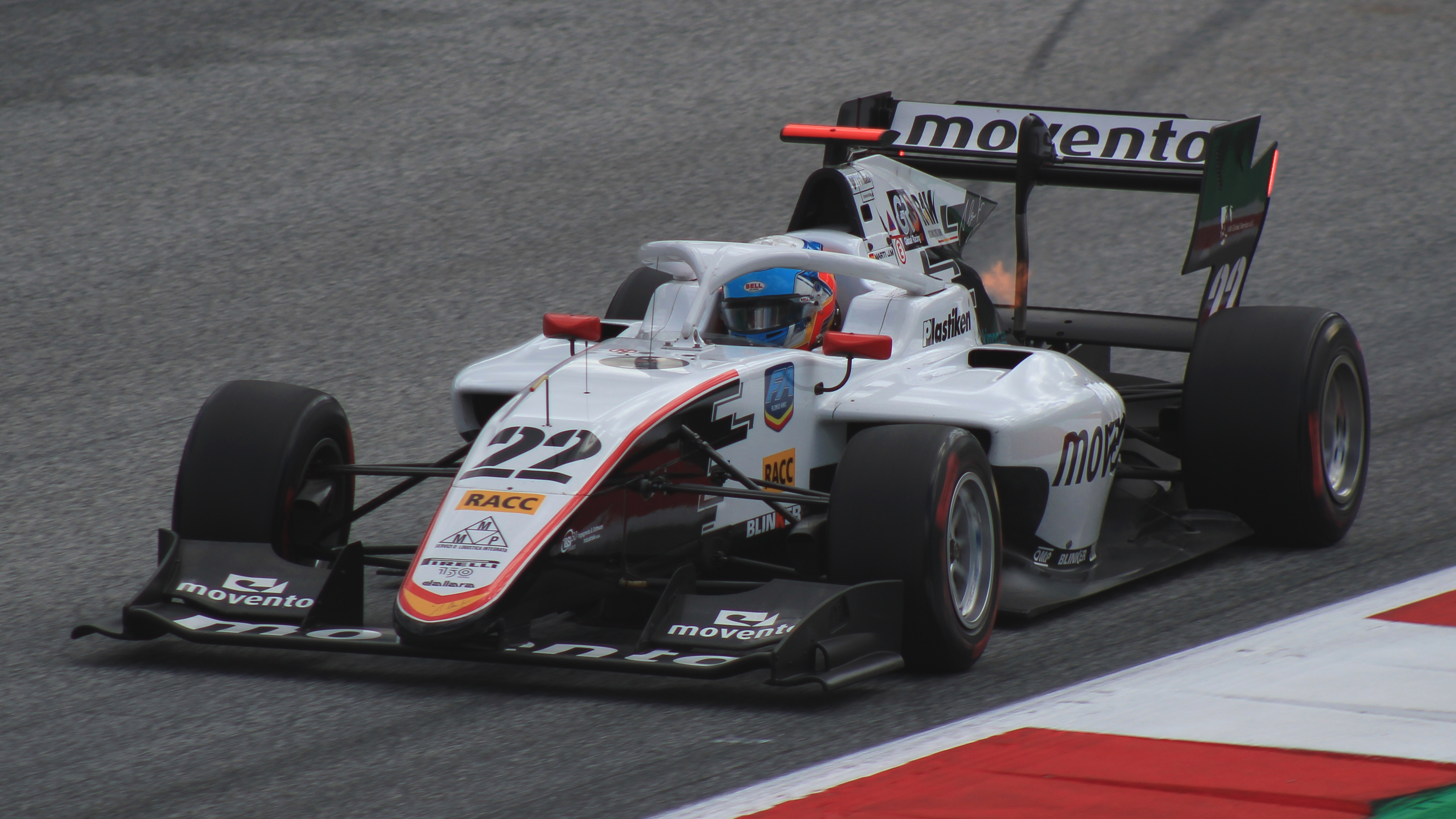
Martí driving the Dallara F3 2019 during the 2022 Spielberg Formula 3 round

After testing for the team in 2021 post-season, Martí made the step up to the FIA Formula 3 Championship in 2022 with Campos Racing. Martí had a disappointing season, but had a promising debut with a drive from 20th to 13th in the feature race. In the Imola feature race, he made a strategy gamble to stay on the wets on a drying track, and led the race for a number of laps before pitting for slicks. He finished the race in 15th. He scored his first points finish in the final round at Monza in the sprint race, where he finished ninth after starting third. He ended the season 26th in the standings with two points, ahead of teammate Hunter Yeany but far from other teammate and fellow countryman David Vidales. At the end of the season, Martí took part in the post-season test, remaining with Campos.

==== 2023 ====
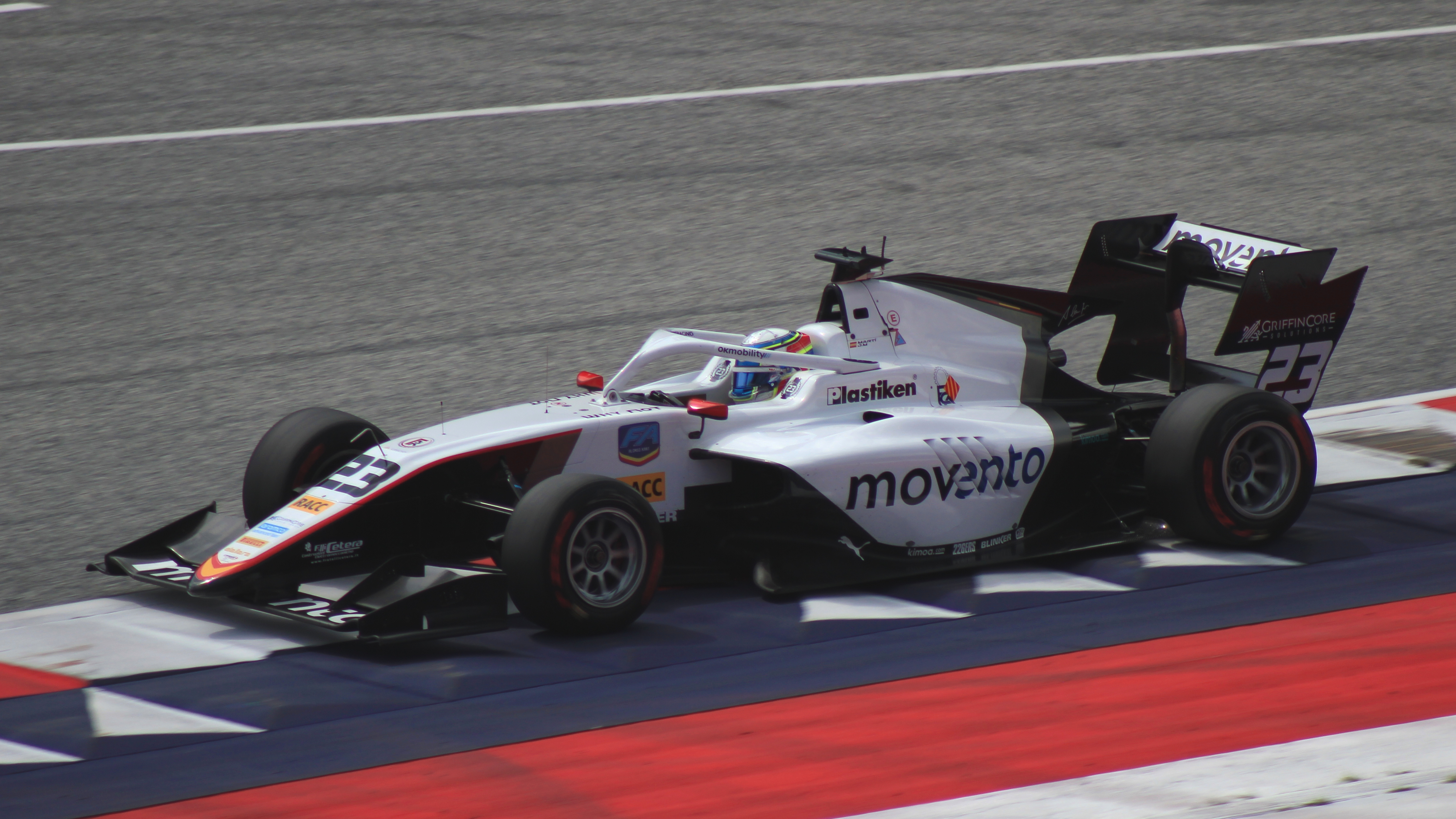
Martí driving for Campos Racing during the 2023 Spielberg Formula 3 round

Martí continued with Campos Racing for the 2023 Formula 3 season alongside Christian Mansell and Hugh Barter. He started the season in the best fashion during the sprint race as from second, he overcame Franco Colapinto for the lead before proceeding to take his first F3 victory. In the feature race, he moved up to sixth place in an impressive showing. In Melbourne, a crash in qualifying hampered his hopes for the races, but he managed to make impressive recoveries during the races, finishing 13th in the sprint and securing points in the feature with seventh place. Qualifying on reverse pole in Monaco, Martí handled things perfectly in the sprint race, as he secured a lights-to-flag victory by eight seconds; his second of the year. He finished ninth in the feature race.

Martí then sailed to his first pole in his home Barcelona round. After a solid eighth in the sprint race, Martí proceeded to dominate the feature race and claim a home victory by four seconds, moving him to second in the standings. Starting on reverse pole for Austria, Martí controlled the majority of the sprint race, but a late safety car led to him struggling after that; he rapidly dropped to sixth during the last three laps. A difficult feature race followed as his finished behind both his teammates in ninth place. Martí qualified third in Silverstone. Despite being a pit stop mid-race to fit wet tyres, in which in proved to be the eventual wrong choice, Martí managed to fend off a faster Alex García for tenth. He returned to the podium with third place in a damp feature race.

Starting 13th for both races in Hungary, Martí was spun around in the latter stages of the race by Nikola Tsolov and he dropped to 20th. In the feature race, he starred in an overtake masterclass as he improved to sixth place. Martí cruised to his second pole position in Spa-Francorchamps. His sprint race was cut short as he was tagged into a spin by Gabriele Minì, and Martí would later collide into Ido Cohen as he re-joined, putting both out of the race. In the feature race, he made a wrong gamble on slick tyres on a damp track, as he slipped to ninth at the flag. Martí had a torrid end to the season in Monza with a double retirement, due to incidents out of his control. Despite that, Martí finished fifth in the Drivers' Championship with three wins, two poles, four podiums and 105 points.

2023 Macau Grand Prix

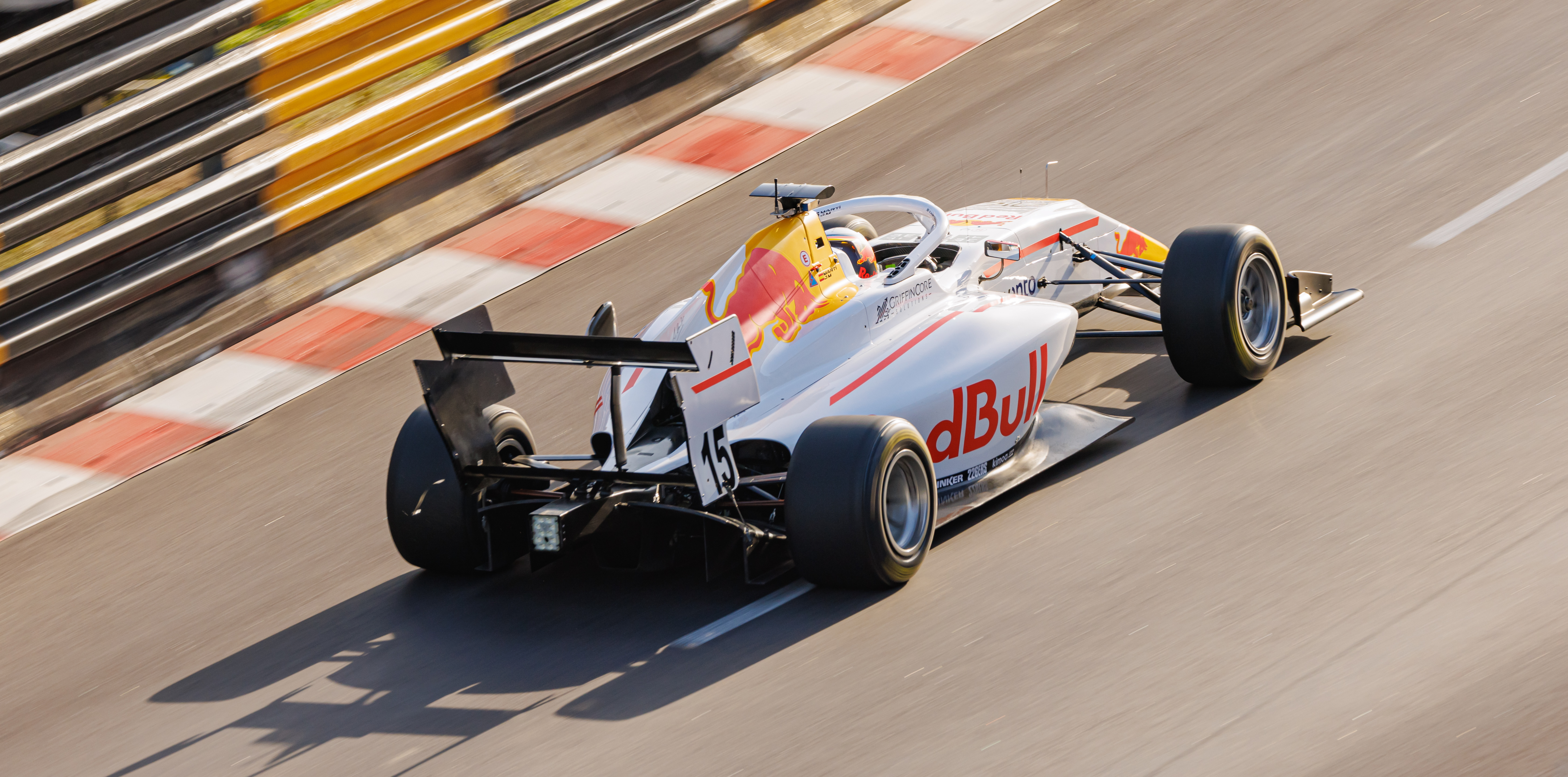
Martí racing at the 2023 Macau Grand Prix with Campos

Martí also competed in the Macau Grand Prix with Campos. He ended his debut Macau race in fifth position, the highest Campos driver.

=== FIA Formula 2 (2024–2025) ===
==== 2024 ====
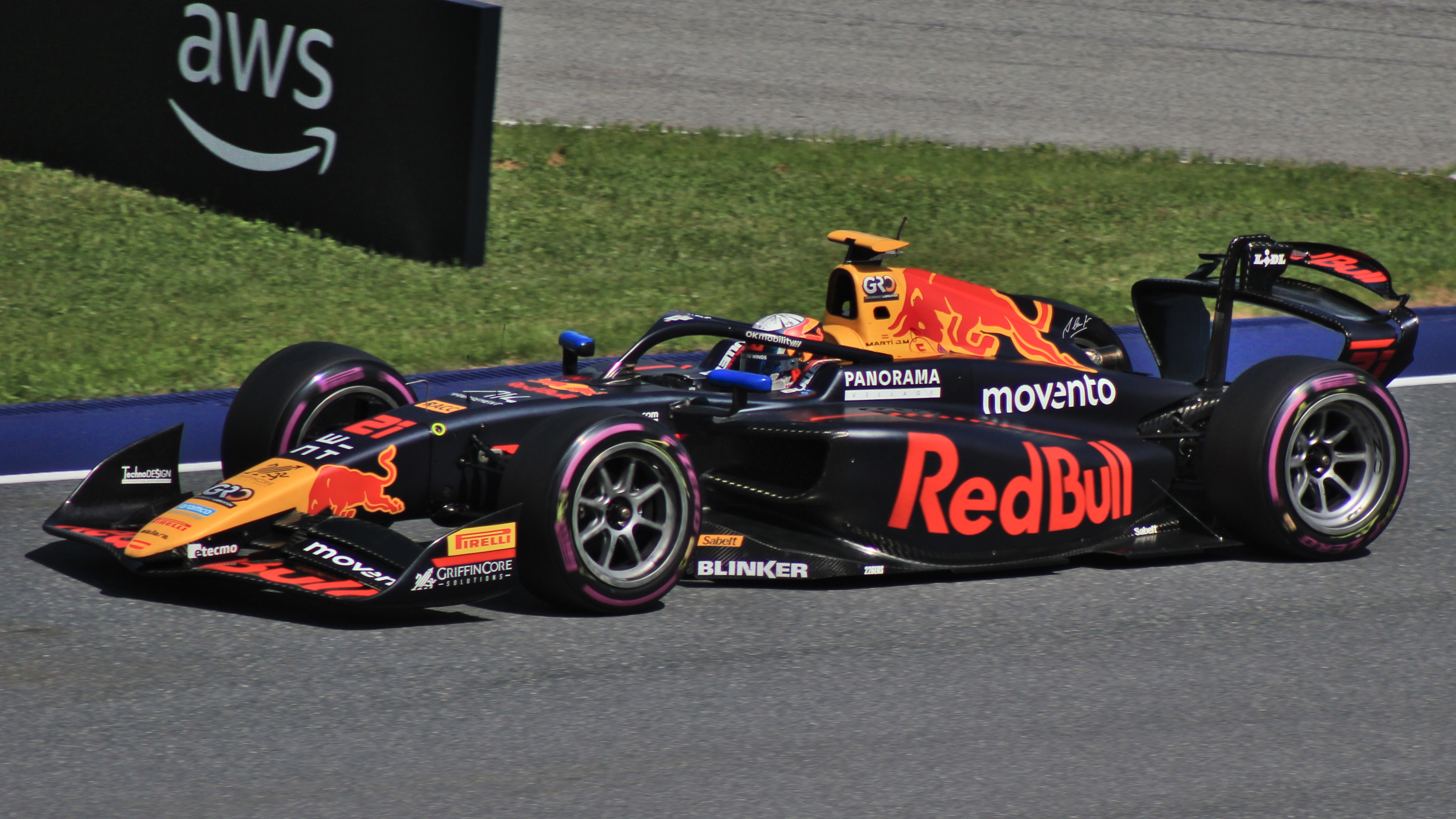
Martí driving the Dallara F2 2024 during the 2024 Spielberg Formula 2 round

Martí graduated to Formula 2 for his 2024 campaign, continuing his relationship with Campos Racing alongside fellow Red Bull junior Isack Hadjar. He qualified 11th for the opening Bahrain round but starred in the sprint race, overtaking car after car to reach third place and secure a debut podium. He was even more impressive in the feature race with second place, becoming the third driver in the category to debut with a double podium. Qualifying 11th again in Jeddah, but in the sprint race he manage to progress to seventh place having forced an error on Kush Maini on the final lap. Unfortunately, Martí spun on the opening lap of the feature race and was forced to retire. Despite qualifying in the top-ten for the first in Melbourne, he had a forgettable weekend, being involved in a collision at the start of the sprint race and contact with Oliver Bearman in the feature race dropped him out of the points.

Martí would then have to wait until his home Barcelona feature race to score points again, in which he finished in ninth. After qualifying eighth in Austria, he vaulted to second early on in the sprint race, and despite pressure on leader Bearman, Martí did take his first podium since Bahrain. In the feature race, an early pit stop under the virtual safety car meant he assumed the virtual lead after the pit stops, but dropped to fourth at the end on ageing tyres; which included a heated tension with teammate Hadjar. Later, he was later penalised down to 15th due to his illegal pitstop under the VSC. Martí then returned to the points in the Silverstone feature race with tenth place, having once again being in an unavoidable incident in the sprint race. He had a disastrous weekend in Spa-Francorchamps with a double DNF, most notably being in another first-lap accident, this time with Bearman.

Martí qualified seventh in Monza and scrapped for the top places in the sprint, but eventually finished in fourth. In the feature race, he received a ten-second penalty for taking out Paul Aron at the start, which compromised his race and was left to finish in 12th place. He was involved in a scary crash during the Baku feature race after he piled into a stalled Kush Maini, causing Martí's car to flip upside down. In the Yas Marina season finale, Martí earned his big break as he shot up to the lead from sprint at the start of the sprint race. He proceeded to control the remainder of the race, taking his first F2 victory in fashion. Running the alternate strategy in the feature race, he concluded his successful weekend in sixth place.

Martí finished his rookie season 14th in the drivers' standings with one win, four podiums and 62 points.

==== 2025 ====
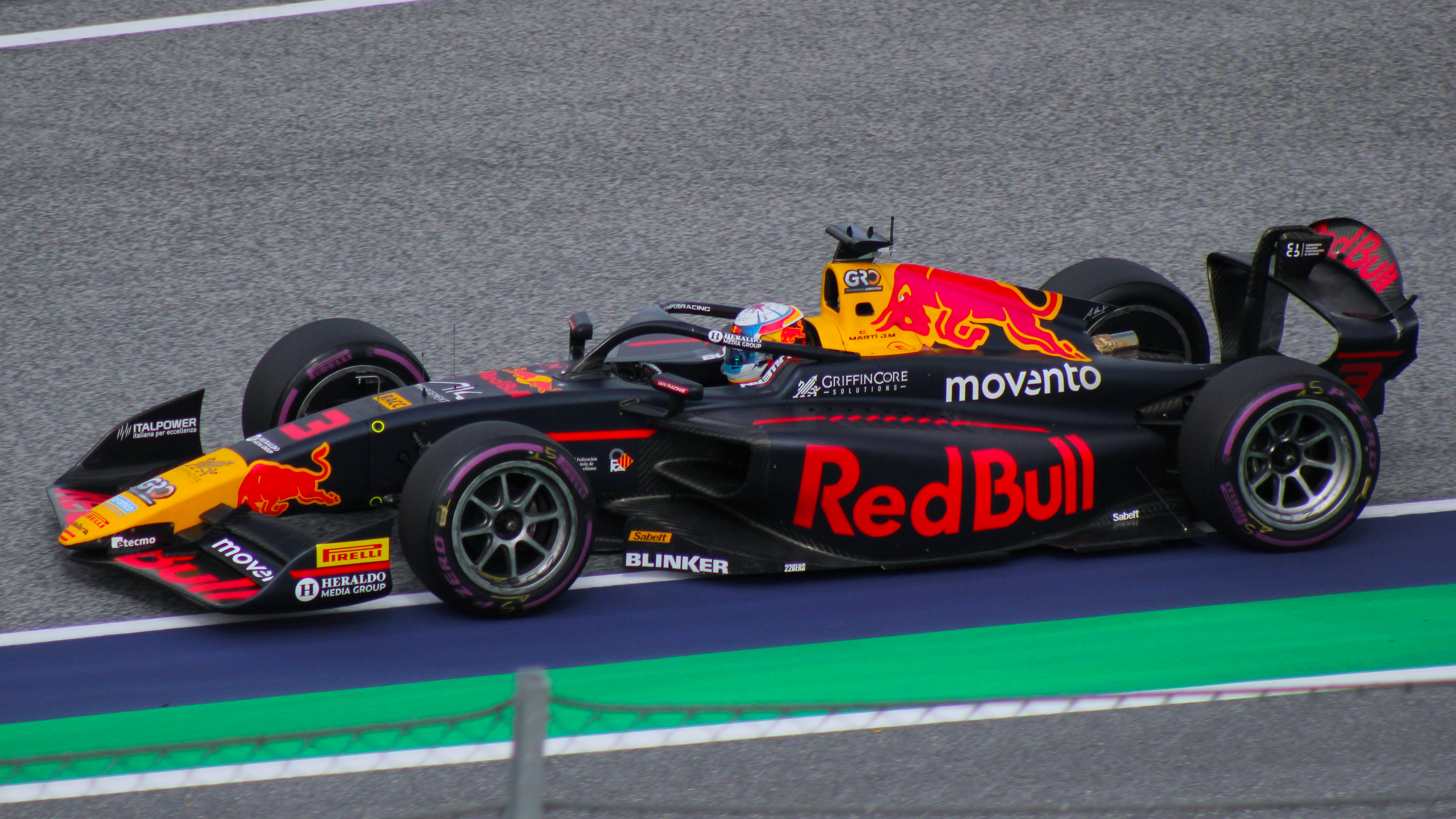
Martí driving for Campos during the 2025 Spielberg Formula 2 round

Martí continued with Campos Racing for the 2025 season, alongside his fellow Red Bull junior Arvid Lindblad. Aiming to "fight at the front", he qualified a disappointing 12th in the Melbourne opener, but made improvements in the sprint race to take eighth. Martí qualified 11th again in Bahrain, and stormed through the pack in the sprint race, overtaking Joshua Dürksen to take his first win of the season. Another explosive lap in the feature race launched him into fifth, and eventually barely missed out on a podium to Leonardo Fornaroli by four tenths at the chequered flag. In Jeddah, Martí battled intensely with Richard Verschoor for the lead, but a mistake mid-race saw him drop to third behind teammate Lindblad. Despite that, Martí was promoted to second place following a penalty for Verschoor. He finished the feature race in fifth place, allowing him to move up to second in the championship.

A pointless outing in Imola dropped Martí outside the top five in the standings, and was followed by a double retirement in Monaco. Martí returned to the points during the Barcelona feature race, where a good start rewarded the Spaniard with sixth place. He earned his second win of the year during the Austrian sprint race, having made a great start before passing Dürksen for the lead. In the feature race, he was set for a potential podium but received a ten-second penalty for hitting Victor Martins, dropping him to sixth. He made up ten positions in the Silverstone Feature race and secured points in ninth place, before taking a solid points haul with fifth and fourth in Spa-Francorchamps. In the Budapest sprint race Martí had a tense battle for the lead with teammate Lindblad, but eventually emerged victorious of the two, leading home for his third win. A slow pit stop in the feature race prevented him from scoring more points; he finished tenth.

Having started down in 13th in Monza, Martí narrowly missed out on points in the sprint, but capitalised on on-track incidents to take third place; his first feature race podium of the year. He was hit with misfortune in Baku, being taken out in a collision with Rafael Villagómez in the sprint, and a post-race penalty for contact with Martinius Stenshorne dropped Martí outside the points from sixth. Prior to the Qatar round, Martí signed with CUPRA Kiro to compete in the 2025–26 Formula E season and subsequently ended his Formula 2 campaign; he was replaced by Formula 3 vice-champion Nikola Tsolov. At that time Martí sat sixth in the standings, three points ahead of teammate Lindblad, who would end up joining Formula One with Racing Bulls in 2026.

=== Formula One ===
In September 2022, Martí was announced to join two-time Formula One champion Fernando Alonso's management team, A14 Management. In August 2023, he entered the Red Bull Junior Team.

== Formula E ==
=== Cupra Kiro (2025–) ===
==== 2025–26 season: Top rookie ====
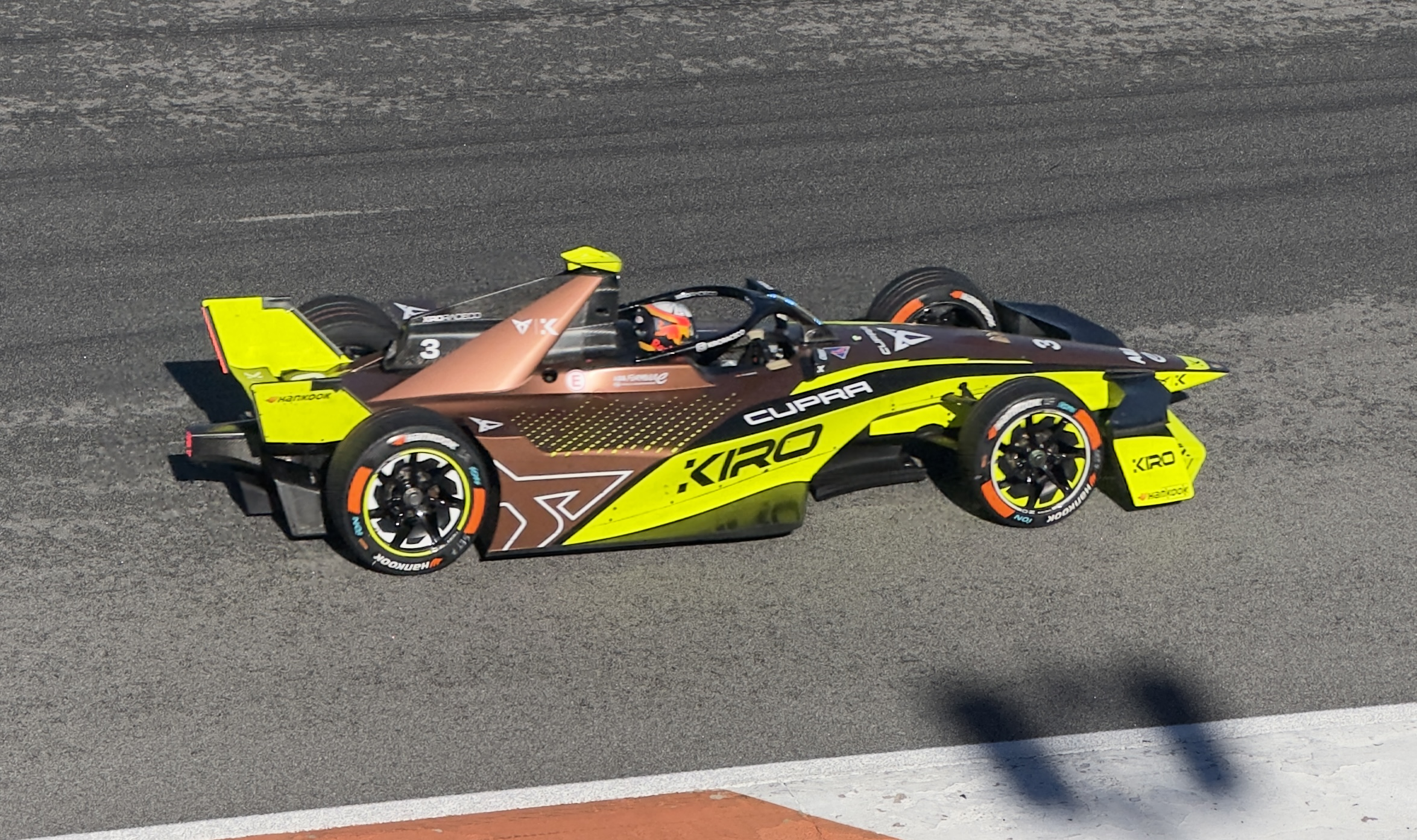
Martí driving the Formula E Gen3 Evo in 2025

After two years in Formula 2, Martí switched to Formula E with Cupra Kiro, driving alongside Dan Ticktum during the 2025–26 season. Martí scored his first top-ten finish in his second race in Mexico City, finishing seventh after starting from 20th and serving a ten-second stop-go penalty following an inverter, MGU, and gearbox change during practice. Continuing his points scoring run, claiming five top-ten finishes in eight races, Martí finished third in Monaco to secure his first Formula E podium and become the first Spanish driver to finish on the podium in the series, followed by a second place finish in Sanya.

==== 2026-27 season ====
Martí is set to continue at Cupra Kiro into the Gen4 era for the 2026–27 season.

== Other racing ==
=== Sportscar racing ===
Martí made his sportscar and prototype debut at the 2022 Historic Zandvoort Grand Prix competing in the Masters Endurance Legends, organised by Masters Historic Racing, in a Duqueine-run Norma M30. He won both races in his G2/P3 class and finished on the overall podium against higher class machinery in race 1.

== Karting record ==
=== Karting career summary ===
Season	Series	Team	Position
2018	Spanish Championship — Junior		10th
2018	CIK-FIA European Championship — OKJ	Tony Kart Racing Team	32nd
2018	CIK-FIA World Championship — OKJ	Tony Kart Racing Team	19th
2018	IAME International Final — X30 Junior		31st
2018	WSK Final Cup — OKJ		12th
2019	IAME Winter Cup — X30 Junior	FA Racing Spain	16th
2019	South Garda Winter Cup — OKJ	Tony Kart Racing Team	17th
2019	WSK Super Master Series — OKJ	Tony Kart Racing Team	11th
2019	WSK Euro Series — OKJ	Tony Kart Racing Team	24th
2019	CIK-FIA European Championship — OKJ	Tony Kart Racing Team	17th
2019	CIK-FIA World Championship — OKJ	Tony Kart Racing Team	4th
2019	Spanish Championship — Junior		**1st**
2019	IAME International Final — X30 Senior		NC
2019	WSK Open Cup — OK	Tony Kart Racing Team	17th
2019	WSK Final Cup — OK		13th
2020	South Garda Winter Cup — OK	KR Motorsport Srl	14th
2020	WSK Champions Cup — OK	KR Motorsport Srl	34th
2020	WSK Euro Series — OK	KR Motorsport Srl	30th
2020	WSK Super Master Series — OK	KR Motorsport Srl	25th
2020	CIK-FIA European Championship — OK	KR Motorsport Srl	39th
2020	CIK-FIA World Championship — OK	KR Motorsport Srl	7th

=== Complete CIK-FIA Karting European Championship results ===
(key) (Races in bold indicate pole position) (Races in italics indicate fastest lap)

Year	Team	Class	1	2	3	4	5	6	7	8	DC	Points
2018	Tony Kart Racing Team	OKJ	SAR; QH; 12	SAR; R 12	PFI; QH; 22	PFI; R 27	AMP; QH; 41	AMP; R DNQ	AUB; QH; 38	AUB; R DNQ	32nd	4
2019	Tony Kart Racing Team	OKJ	ANG; QH; 10	ANG; R 4	GEN; QH; 24	GEN; R 14	KRI; QH; 24	KRI; R 16	LEM; QH; 34	LEM; R 22	17th	16
2020	KR Motorsport Srl	OK	ZUE; QH; 33	ZUE; R 23	SAR; QH; 18	SAR; R 29	WAC; QH	WAC; R			39th	0

== Racing record ==
=== Racing career summary ===
Season	Series	Team	Races	Wins	Poles	F/Laps	Podiums	Points	Position
2021	Formula 4 UAE Championship	Xcel Motorsport	19	1	1	0	4	135	7th
2021	F4 Spanish Championship	Campos Racing	21	2	3	4	9	196	**3rd**
2022	Formula Regional Asian Championship	Pinnacle Motorsport	15	0	0	2	5	158	**2nd**
2022	FIA Formula 3 Championship	Campos Racing	18	0	0	0	0	2	26th
2022	Masters Endurance Legends – Prototype	Duqueine	2	2	2	2	2	15	20th
2023	Formula Regional Middle East Championship	Pinnacle VAR	12	2	0	0	2	79	7th
2023	FIA Formula 3 Championship	Campos Racing	18	3	2	2	4	105	5th
2023	Macau Grand Prix	Campos Racing	1	0	0	0	0	N/A	5th
2024	FIA Formula 2 Championship	Campos Racing	28	1	0	2	4	62	14th
2025	FIA Formula 2 Championship	Campos Racing	23	3	0	0	5	112	8th
2025–26	Formula E	Cupra Kiro	17	0	0	0	2	66	13th
2026–27	Formula E	Cupra Kiro	0	0	0	0	0	0	TBD

* Season still in progress.

=== Complete Formula 4 UAE Championship results ===
(key) (Races in bold indicate pole position) (Races in italics indicate fastest lap)

Year	Team	1	2	3	4	5	6	7	8	9	10	11	12	13	14	15	16	17	18	19	20	Pos	Points
2021	Xcel Motorsport	DUB1; 1 Ret	DUB1; 2 DNS	DUB1; 3 Ret	DUB1; 4 Ret	YMC1; 1; 3	YMC1; 2; 4	YMC1; 3; 11	YMC1; 4; 8	DUB2; 1; 6	DUB2; 2; 2	DUB2; 3; 5	DUB2; 4; 8	YMC2; 1; 3	**YMC2**; **2**; 1	YMC2; 3; 4	YMC2; 4 Ret	DUB3; 1 Ret	DUB3; 2; 4	DUB3; 3; 11	DUB3; 4 Ret	7th	135

=== Complete F4 Spanish Championship results ===
(key) (Races in bold indicate pole position) (Races in italics indicate fastest lap)

Year	Team	1	2	3	4	5	6	7	8	9	10	11	12	13	14	15	16	17	18	19	20	21	Pos	Points
2021	Campos Racing	SPA; 1; 5	SPA; 2; 6	SPA; 3; 2	NAV; 1; 12	NAV; 2; 10	NAV; 3; 9	ALG; 1 Ret	ALG; 2; 3	ALG; 3; 12	ARA; 1; 3	**ARA**; **2**; 1	**ARA**; **3**; 1	CRT; 1; 2	CRT; 2; 11	CRT; 3; 7	JER; 1; 5	JER; 2; 3	JER; 3; 3	CAT; 1; 2	CAT; 2; 11	**CAT**; **3**; 4	3rd	196

=== Complete Formula Regional Asian/Middle East Championship results ===
(key) (Races in bold indicate pole position) (Races in italics indicate the fastest lap of top ten finishers)

Year	Entrant	1	2	3	4	5	6	7	8	9	10	11	12	13	14	15	DC	Points
2022	Pinnacle Motorsport	ABU; 1 Ret	ABU; 2 Ret	ABU; 3; 4	DUB; 1; 2	DUB; 2; 7	DUB; 3; 2	DUB; 1; 4	DUB; 2; 4	DUB; 3; 2	DUB; 1; 3	DUB; 2; 4	DUB; 3; 3	ABU; 1; 12	ABU; 2; 4	ABU; 3; 6	2nd	158
2023	Pinnacle VAR	DUB1; 1; 14	DUB1; 2; 9	DUB1; 3; 6	KUW1; 1 Ret	KUW1; 2; 10	KUW1; 3; 6	KUW2; 1	KUW2; 2	KUW2; 3	DUB2; 1; 10	DUB2; 2; 1	DUB2; 3; 11	ABU; 1; 6	ABU; 2; 1	ABU; 3; 11	8th	78

=== Complete FIA Formula 3 Championship results ===
(key) (Races in bold indicate pole position; races in italics indicate points for the fastest lap of top ten finishers)

Year	Entrant	1	2	3	4	5	6	7	8	9	10	11	12	13	14	15	16	17	18	DC	Points
2022	Campos Racing	BHR; SPR; Ret	BHR; FEA; 13	IMO; SPR; Ret	IMO; FEA; 15	CAT; SPR; 13	CAT; FEA; 20	SIL; SPR; 20	SIL; FEA; 23	RBR; SPR; 13	RBR; FEA; Ret	HUN; SPR; 14	HUN; FEA; 29	SPA; SPR; Ret	SPA; FEA; 22	ZAN; SPR; 19	ZAN; FEA; 14	MNZ; SPR; 9	MNZ; FEA; 26	26th	2
2023	Campos Racing	BHR; SPR; 1	BHR; FEA; 6	MEL; SPR; 13	MEL; FEA; 7	MON; SPR; 1	MON; FEA; 9	CAT; SPR; 8	**CAT**; **FEA**; 1	RBR; SPR; 6	RBR; FEA; 9	SIL; SPR; 10	SIL; FEA; 3	HUN; SPR; 20	HUN; FEA; 6	SPA; SPR; Ret	**SPA**; **FEA**; 9	MNZ; SPR; Ret	MNZ; FEA; Ret	5th	105

=== Complete Macau Grand Prix results ===
Year	Team	Car	Qualifying	Quali Race	Main Race
2023	(Spain) Campos Racing	Dallara F3 2019	11th	8th	5th

=== Complete FIA Formula 2 Championship results ===
(key) (Races in bold indicate pole position; races in italics indicate points for the fastest lap of the top-10 finishers)

Year	Entrant	1	2	3	4	5	6	7	8	9	10	11	12	13	14	15	16	17	18	19	20	21	22	23	24	25	26	27	28	Pos	Points
2024	Campos Racing	BHR; SPR; 3	BHR; FEA; 2	JED; SPR; 7	JED; FEA; Ret	MEL; SPR; Ret	MEL; FEA; 13	IMO; SPR; 16	IMO; FEA; Ret	MON; SPR; Ret	MON; FEA; 14	CAT; SPR; 11	CAT; FEA; 9	RBR; SPR; 2	RBR; FEA; 15	SIL; SPR; Ret	SIL; FEA; 10	HUN; SPR; 17	HUN; FEA; 12	SPA; SPR; Ret	SPA; FEA; Ret	MNZ; SPR; 4	MNZ; FEA; 12	BAK; SPR; 19	BAK; FEA; Ret	LSL; SPR; Ret	LSL; FEA; 16	YMC; SPR; 1	YMC; FEA; 6	14th	62
2025	Campos Racing	MEL; SPR; 8	MEL; FEA; C	BHR; SPR; 1	BHR; FEA; 4	JED; SPR; 2	JED; FEA; 5	IMO; SPR; 16	IMO; FEA; 14	MON; SPR; Ret	MON; FEA; Ret	CAT; SPR; 14	CAT; FEA; 6	RBR; SPR; 1	RBR; FEA; 6	SIL; SPR; 10	SIL; FEA; 9	SPA; SPR; 5	SPA; FEA; 4	HUN; SPR; 1	HUN; FEA; 10	MNZ; SPR; 9	MNZ; FEA; 3	BAK; SPR; Ret	BAK; FEA; 11	LSL; SPR	LSL; FEA	YMC; SPR	YMC; FEA	8th	112

=== Complete Formula E results ===
(key) (Races in bold indicate pole position; races in italics indicate fastest lap)

Year	Team	Chassis	Powertrain	1	2	3	4	5	6	7	8	9	10	11	12	13	14	15	16	17	Pos	Points
2025–26	Cupra Kiro	Formula E Gen3 Evo	Porsche 99X Electric	SAO; Ret	MEX; 7	MIA; 9	JED; 14	JED; 6	MAD; 9	BER; 7	BER; 12	MCO; 3	MCO; Ret	SAN; 2	SHA; 14	SHA; 12	TKO; 8	TKO; Ret	LDN; Ret	LDN; 8	13th	66

* Season still in progress.

Sporting positions
Preceded by Ayumu Iwasa	Formula Regional Asian Championship; Rookie Champion; 2022	Succeeded by Defunct
