= 2021 NACAM Formula 4 Championship =

The 2021 NACAM Formula 4 Championship season was planned to be the sixth season of the NACAM Formula 4 Championship. It was supposed to begin on 3 June at Autódromo Monterrey in Apodaca and end on 7 November at Autódromo Hermanos Rodríguez in Mexico City after five rounds. However, because of the pandemic issues, four non-championship events were held instead.

== México City Grand Prix: NACAM F4 teams and drivers ==
Team	No.	Driver
(Mexico) SP Driver Academy Team	2	(Mexico) Artie Flores
(Mexico) RRK Motorsports	3	(Mexico) Emil Abed
(Mexico) RRK Motorsports	77	(Panama) Valentino Mini
(Mexico) Scuderia Martiga EG	7	(United States) Kory Enders
(Mexico) Scuderia Martiga EG	8	(Mexico) Álvaro Zambrano
(Mexico) Scuderia Martiga EG	17	(Mexico) José Andrés Martínez
(Mexico) Easy-Shop.com Racing	9	(Mexico) Daniel Forcadell
(Mexico) Ram Racing	11	(Mexico) Mariano Martínez
(Mexico) Ram Racing	16	(Mexico) Alejandro Berumen
(Mexico) Ram Racing	33	(Colombia) Lucas Medina
(Mexico) RPL Racing	22	(Mexico) Andrés Pérez de Lara
(Mexico) RPL Racing	23	(Mexico) Erick Zúñiga

== Race calendar ==
The calendar was announced on 24 March 2021. The season was set to start with two rounds in the United States and the rest in Mexico. The American rounds were turned into non-championship event, resulting in the season start officially moving to Autódromo Monterrey in June. The round at Autódromo Monterrey on 3–4 June did not take place without any statement from the organizers. The series was due to restart in September. The round at Autódromo Hermanos Rodríguez scheduled for 11–12 September was moved to EcoCentro Expositor Querétaro as the former served as a temporary COVID-19 hospital. With this one also cancelled, a replacement event occurred at Auódromo Miguel E. Abed to act as a warm-up event to the series' support race at the Mexico City Grand Prix.

Round	Circuit	Date	Pole position	Fastest lap	Winning driver	Winning team
NC	(United States) MSR Houston (Angleton, Texas)	30 April–1 May	(United States) Kory Enders	(United States) Kory Enders	(Colombia) Lucas Medina	(Mexico) Ram Racing
NC	(United States) MSR Houston (Angleton, Texas)	30 April–1 May		(Mexico) José Andrés Martínez	(Mexico) José Andrés Martínez	(Mexico) Scuderia Martiga EG
NC	(United States) MSR Houston (Angleton, Texas)	30 April–1 May		(United States) Kory Enders	(United States) Kory Enders	(Mexico) Scuderia Martiga EG
NC	(United States) MSR Houston (Angleton, Texas)	4-5 May	(United States) Kory Enders	(United States) Kory Enders	(United States) Kory Enders	(Mexico) Scuderia Martiga EG
NC	(United States) MSR Houston (Angleton, Texas)	4-5 May		(United States) Kory Enders	(Mexico) Alejandro Berumen	(Mexico) Ram Racing
NC	(United States) MSR Houston (Angleton, Texas)	4-5 May		(Colombia) Lucas Medina	(Colombia) Lucas Medina	(Mexico) Ram Racing
NC	(Mexico) Autódromo Miguel E. Abed (Amozoc, Puebla)	1–2 November	(United States) Kory Enders	(United States) Kory Enders	(United States) Kory Enders	(Mexico) Scuderia Martiga EG
NC	(Mexico) Autódromo Miguel E. Abed (Amozoc, Puebla)	1–2 November		(Colombia) Lucas Medina	(United States) Kory Enders	(Mexico) Scuderia Martiga EG
NC	(Mexico) Autódromo Miguel E. Abed (Amozoc, Puebla)	1–2 November		(United States) Kory Enders	(United States) Kory Enders	(Mexico) Scuderia Martiga EG
NC	Autódromo Hermanos Rodríguez (Mexico City)	7 November	(Colombia) Lucas Medina	(United States) Kory Enders	(Mexico) Artie Flores	(United States) SP Driver Academy Team

== México City Grand Prix: NACAM F4 Race Results ==
Pos	Driver	Team	Laps	Time/Retired	Grid
1	(Mexico) Artie Flores	(Mexico) SP Driver Academy Team	16	30:22.171	2
2	(Colombia) Lucas Medina	(Mexico) Ram Racing	16	+0.206	1
3	(Mexico) Erick Zúñiga	(Mexico) RPL Racing	16	+7.487	5
4	(Panama) Valentino Mini	(Mexico) RRK Motorsports	16	+8.090	7
5	(Mexico) Mariano Martínez	(Mexico) Ram Racing	16	+8.219	4
6	(United States) Kory Enders	(Mexico) Scuderia Martiga EG	16	+8.938	3
7	(Mexico) Alejandro Berumen	(Mexico) Ram Racing	16	+15.508	6
8	(Mexico) Daniel Forcadell	(Mexico) Easy-Shop.com Racing	16	+15.755	9
9	(Mexico) Emil Abed	(Mexico) RRK Motorsports	16	+20.062	10
NC	(Mexico) José Andrés Martínez	(Mexico) Scuderia Martiga EG	12	Retired	11
NC	(Mexico) Álvaro Zambrano	(Mexico) Scuderia Martiga EG	8	Retired	12
NC	(Mexico) Andrés Pérez de Lara	(Mexico) RPL Racing	8	Retired	8
Fastest Lap: (United States) Kory Enders (1:47.688)
