= Martinius Stenshorne =

Norwegian racing driver (born 2006)

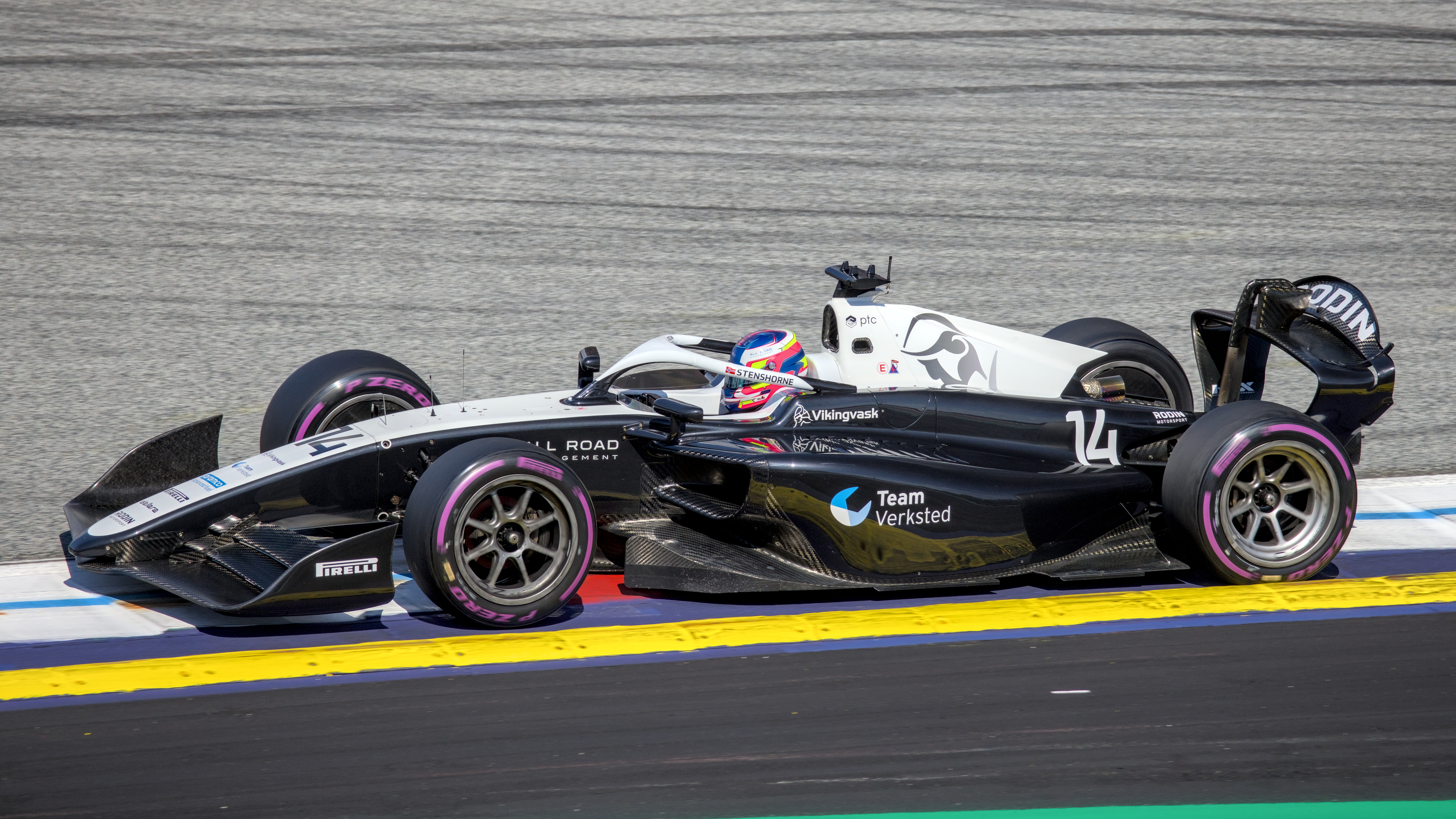
- Stenshorne driving the Dallara F2 2024 during the 2026 Spielberg Formula 2 round
- Nationality: (Norway) Norwegian
- Born: Martinius Kleve Stenshorne; 2 February 2006 (age 20) Hokksund, Buskerud, Norway

FIA Formula 2 Championship career
- Debut season: 2025
- Current team: Rodin Motorsport
- Car number: 14
- Former teams: Trident
- Starts: 23 (24 entries)
- Wins: 1
- Podiums: 4
- Poles: 1
- Fastest laps: 3
- Best finish: 20th in 2025

Previous series
- 2024–2025; 2024; 2023; 2023–2024; 2022; 2022; 2022; 2022: FIA Formula 3; GB3; FR European; FR Middle East; F4 Spanish; ADAC Formula 4; Italian F4; F4 UAE
- Statistics up to date as of 25 August 2026.

Martinius Kleve Stenshorne (Norwegian pronunciation: [mɑːˈʈɪ.niʉs ˈklɛ.ʋə ˈstɛːns.hʊ.ɳə]; born 2 February 2006) is a Norwegian racing driver who competes in the FIA Formula 2 Championship with Rodin Motorsport.

Stenshorne previously competed in the FIA Formula 3 Championship in 2024 and 2025 for Hitech TGR, finishing fifth in the latter. He was the 2023 FRECA runner-up, driving for R-ace GP. He previously raced with Van Amersfoort Racing in the Italian F4 Championship. He is a part of All Road Management run by Nicolas Todt.

Stenshorne was a member of the McLaren Driver Development Programme from 2024 to 2025.

== Career ==
=== Karting ===
Stenshorne began karting competitively at the age of ten in 2016. He placed second in the WSK Champions Cup in 2018, before proceeding to win the WSK Master Series and the Italian Championship. He placed 13th in the CIK-FIA European Championship in 2019, and improved his place by one in 2021. Other than that, he obtained good results from other championships, like second place in the 2020 WSK Champions Cup. In 2021, he was added to the All Road Management stable run by Nicolas Todt.

=== Formula 4 ===
Stenshorne made his single-seater debut in the 2022 Formula 4 UAE Championship with R-ace GP. He achieved his first podium eight races in, a second place at the last race in Dubai. He eventually finished tenth in the standings, scoring 72 points.

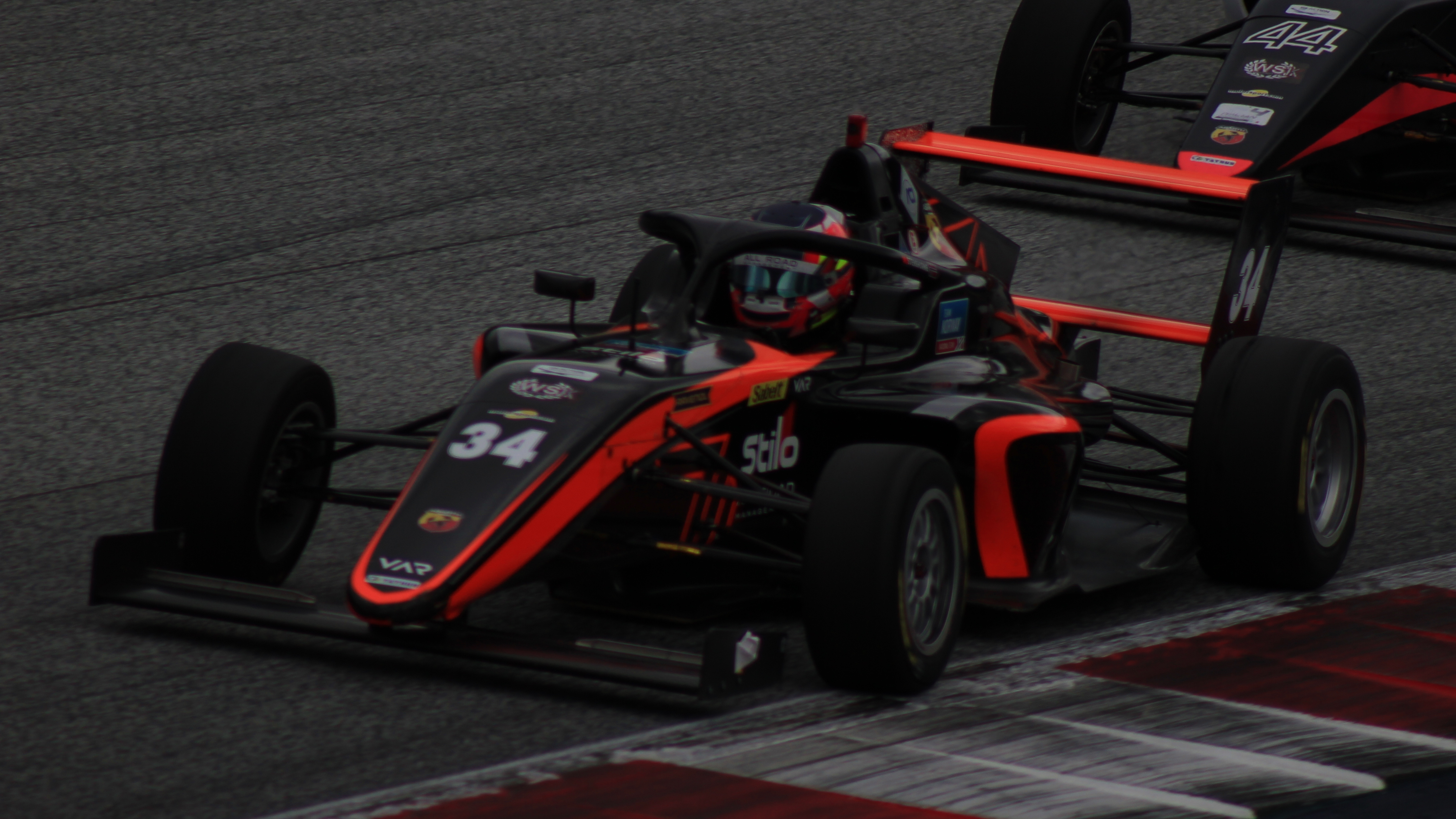
Stenshorne racing in the 2022 Italian F4 Championship at the Red Bull Ring.

For his main campaign, Stenshorne joined Van Amersfoort Racing racing in the 2022 Italian F4 Championship. He began the season positively, scoring two fifth places and a seventh place at Imola. Throughout the next four rounds, even though he failed to get a podium, he managed to score points in every race bar three. Monza delivered a breakthrough, earning a first Italian F4 podium in third place during the second race. After another third place in Mugello, Stenshorne ended his season seventh place in the standings, harnessing 122 points.

Stenshorne was also set to compete full-time in the 2022 ADAC Formula 4 Championship, but VAR withdrew from the first round due to supply chain concerns. The team returned for the second round, but VAR's drivers were classified under guest drivers, resulting in Stenshorne to be classified as a guest driver. He also participated in a one-off round during the 2022 F4 Spanish Championship at MotorLand Aragón. Taking two sixth places and a fifth place, he was classified 17th in the standings.

=== Formula Regional ===
==== 2023 ====
At the start of 2023, Stenshorne moved to the Formula Regional category, partaking in the 2023 Formula Regional Middle East Championship with R-ace GP for the final three rounds. He earned three points finishes and ended the standings in 18th.

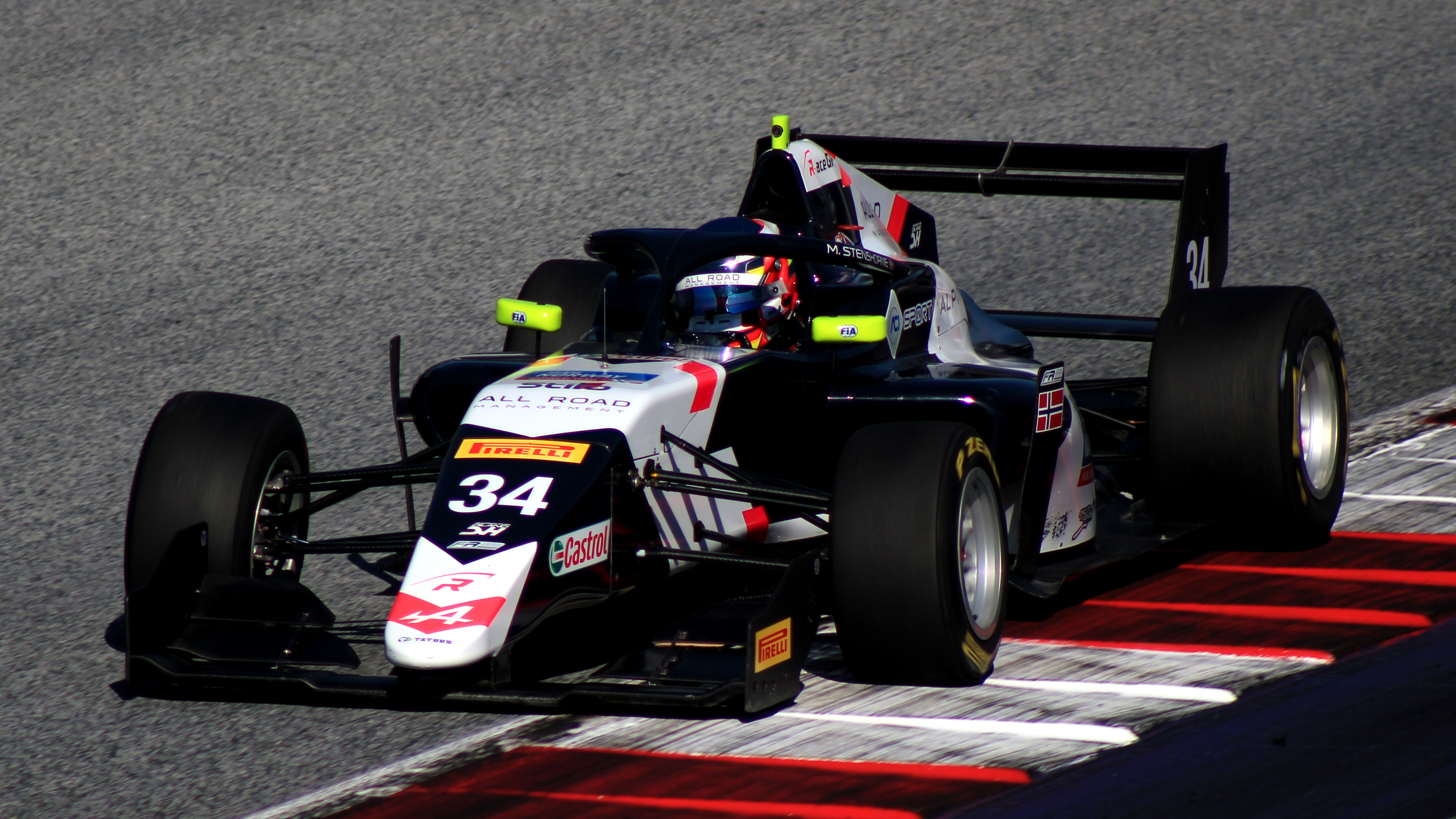
Stenshorne driving at the Red Bull Ring during the 2023 Formula Regional European Championship.

For his main campaign, Stenshorne raced in the Formula Regional European Championship with R-ace GP. Stenshorne shocked the paddock on debut in Imola, by taking pole and proceeding to take his first win in car racing. He would again impress in the second race, taking a second place. He performed a masterclass double victory during the third round in Hungary, giving him an early championship lead. A podium during the next round before taking his fourth win in Mugello. He would eventually lose the standings lead to Italian F4 rival Andrea Kimi Antonelli (who won the second Mugello race as Stenshorne and Santiago Ramos collided across the line fighting for third) during the next round at Paul Ricard. A non-scoring round in Austria hampered his title chances, and it ended after Antonelli clinched the title in the penultimate round. He ended the season in Hockenheim with style, taking a second place before winning the final race. He finished runner-up in the standings with the joint-most five wins, an additional six podiums as well as claiming 261 points.

In November that year, Stenshorne took part in the Macau Grand Prix's Formula 4 races with Pinnacle Motorsport, but failed to finish.

==== 2024 ====
Stenshorne returned to the 2024 Formula Regional Middle East Championship with R-ace GP. He only participated in the first three rounds, but stood on the podium in the first four races. Showing extreme consistency, he was eventually ranked eighth in the standings.

=== GB3 Championship ===
In April 2024, Stenshorne made a cameo appearance in the GB3 Championship with Chris Dittmann Racing. He finished the two races in ninth and 14th.

=== FIA Formula 3 Championship ===
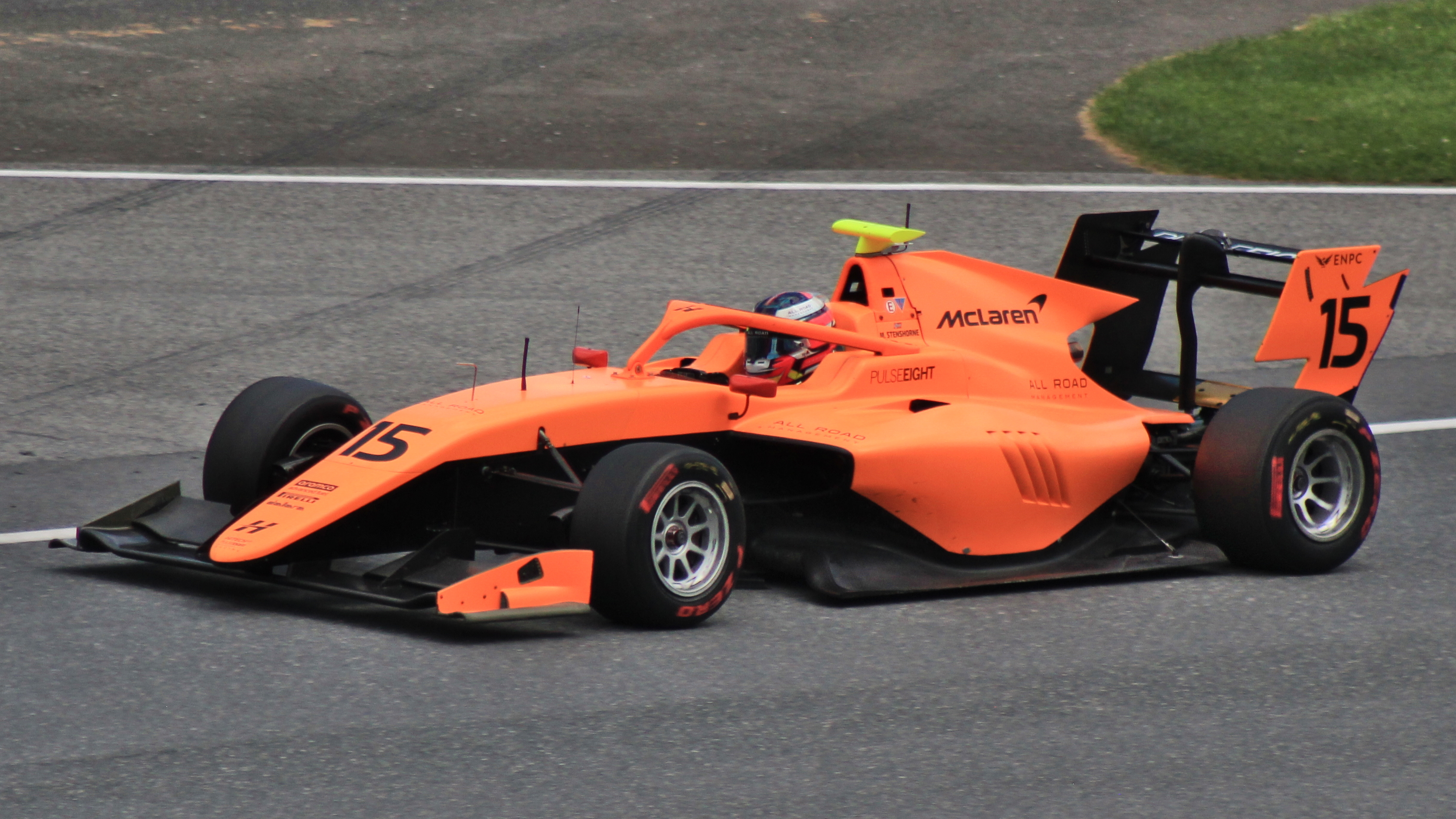
Stenshorne driving the Dallara F3 2019 during the 2024 Spielberg Formula 3 round

==== 2024 ====
Stenshorne partook in the 2023 Formula 3 post-season testing sessions with Hitech Pulse-Eight, setting the fastest time in the afternoon in Jerez. Before the end of 2023, Hitech announced Stenshorne as their driver for the 2024 Formula 3 campaign. He did not score points during the first round in Bahrain, but impressed in the sprint race by charging to 11th from 22nd. Qualifying 11th for Melbourne, he earned his breakthrough in the sprint having started second. After a hard-fought battle with Laurens van Hoepen for the lead, he succeeded in the battle and emerged for his first F3 victory of the season. Unfortunately, a puncture while battling derailed his chances of scoring points in the feature race. He returned to the points in Barcelona with fourth place during the sprint, but was unlucky to suffer a puncture on the last lap from battling Van Hoepen for seventh.

Starting on reverse pole for the sprint race in Austria, Stenshorne dropped to third on the opening lap, but an error from Christian Mansell towards the end of the race lifted Stenshorne to second place. He was suspended from taking part in Round 7 at Silverstone after breaching Article 10.4 of the series' sporting regulations by taking part in another Championship without prior approval from the promoter or FIA in writing. He rounded out the season in Monza with a double points finish with tenth and fifth place. Stenshorne ended the season 18th in the drivers' standings with 38 points, amassing one win and two podiums.

==== 2025 ====
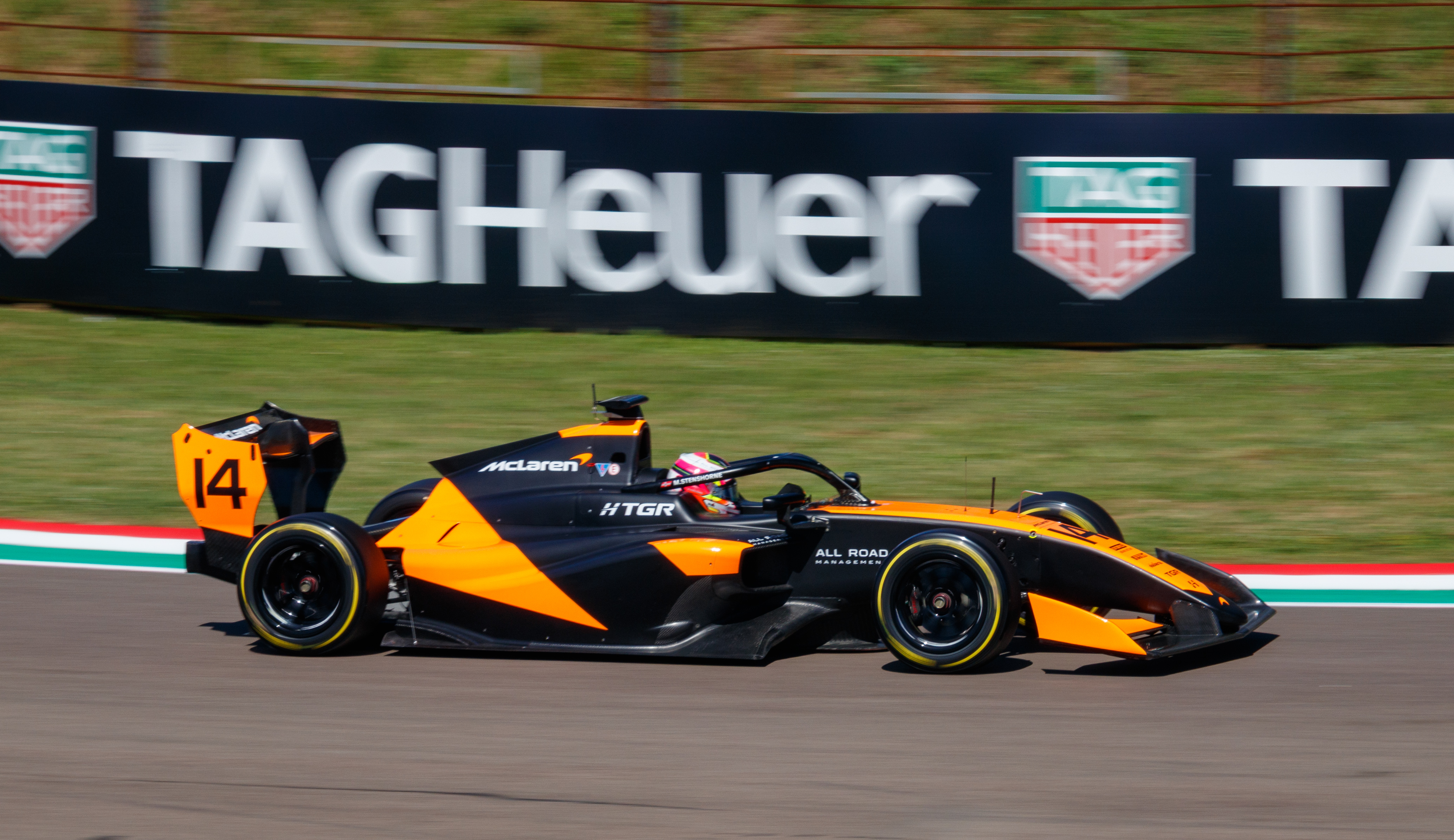
Stenshorne driving the Dallara F3 2025 during the 2025 Imola Formula 3 round

Stenshorne remained with Hitech TGR for his second Formula 3 campaign in 2025. He finished on the podium for the first race in the Melbourne sprint race, having battled Santiago Ramos for the win. He finished eighth in a wet feature race. Starting second in the Bahrain sprint race, Stenshorne struggled with race pace throughout the weekend and he fell to fifth place, whilst he dropped out of the points from 11th in the feature race. Having failed to score in Imola, Stenshorne took his first win of the season in the Monaco sprint race, having passed Alessandro Giusti for the lead off the start line in which he held from start to finish. He made up three places in the feature race and finished in eighth place. Stenshorne was in prime position once again to fight for the win in the Barcelona sprint race starting second, but a collision with Tim Tramnitz and Roman Bilinski sent him into the gravel and out of the race. He had a superb start in the feature race and improved to fifth, but a drop in pace in the second half of the race meant he finished down in ninth place.

Stenshorne qualified down in 15th in Spielberg, but he fought his way through the field in the sprint race, and despite being passed by Mari Boya on the final lap, he still managed to finish in seventh. He replicated his comeback in the feature race, this time being even more impressive as he charged forward to second place, but was promoted to the victory after Nikola Tsolov was disqualified due to a technical irregularity. He qualified seventh in Silverstone, earning back-to-back rostrums after overtaking his rivals to finish runner-up in the sprint race. In the feature race however, his run of form was halted with a wrong choice of dry tyres on a wet track, leaving him to finish down in 17th place. He had his best qualifying of the season in fifth in Spa-Francorchamps. He took points with seventh place in he sprint race, but treacherous weather in the feature race saw it cancelled, depriving Stenshorne the opportunity to add to his tally. A poor qualifying in Budapest left him down in 20th, and he ultimately failed to score points, even attempting to fit slick tyres during a drying track in the feature. In the Monza finale, Stenshorne returned to the podium with a runner-up finish after battling Tramnitz and Bilinski for the top positions. In the feature race, he ran as high as fifth but picked up a puncture after contact with Matías Zagazeta, necessiting him to pit.

Stenshorne finished the 2025 season fifth in the championship with two wins and five podiums.

=== FIA Formula 2 Championship ===
==== 2025 ====
Ahead of the Baku round, Trident announced that Stenshorne would be stepping up to race for them for that round. He debuted with an impressive seventh in qualifying for Baku, and ran as high as second in the sprint before an engine issue curtailed his race. More misery piled in the feature race as he was eliminated early from a collision with Pepe Martí. He would switch to Rodin Motorsport to contest the final two rounds of the season with them, replacing Amaury Cordeel.

==== 2026 ====
Stenshorne remained with Rodin Motorsport for his first full season of Formula 2 in 2026, partnering Alexander Dunne. He had his first podium and victory in the 2026 Montreal Formula 2 round. In his first 7 rounds, he scored 48 points and is currently placed 8th in the championship standings.

=== Formula One ===
Ahead of the 2024 Imola Formula 3 round in May, Stenshorne joined the McLaren Driver Development Programme. He would depart the programme in November 2025.

== Personal life ==
Stenshorne's father, Martin, was also a racing driver who competed in the Barber Pro Series during the 1990s.

== Karting record ==
=== Karting career summary ===
Season	Series	Team	Position
2016	ROK Cup International Final — Mini ROK	Gamoto Asd	31st
2016	Andrea Margutti Trophy — 60 Mini		28th
2017	WSK Super Master Series — 60 Mini		9th
2017	46° Trofeo Delle Industrie — 60 Mini	Parolin Racing Team	3rd
2017	WSK Final Cup — 60 Mini	Parolin Racing Team	4th
2017	ROK Cup International Final — Mini ROK	Parolin Racing Team	6th
2017	Italian Championship — 60 Mini		7th
2018	WSK Champions Cup — 60 Mini	Parolin Racing Team	2nd
2018	23° South Garda Winter Cup — Mini ROK	Parolin Racing Team	6th
2018	WSK Super Master Series — 60 Mini		1st
2018	WSK Final Cup — OKJ		17th
2018	Italian Championship — 60 Mini		1st
2019	WSK Super Master Series — OKJ	Parolin Racing Team	22nd
2019	WSK Champions Cup — OKJ	Parolin Racing Team	NC
2019	WSK Euro Series — OKJ	Parolin Racing Team	17th
2019	CIK-FIA European Championship — OKJ	Parolin Racing Team	13th
2019	CIK-FIA World Championship — OKJ	Ricky Flynn Motorsport	29th
2019	48° Trofeo delle Industrie — OKJ	Team Driver Racing Kart	2nd
2019	German Kart Championship — OKJ	Kart Republic Motorsport	NC
2019	WSK Open Cup — OKJ	Kart Republic Motorsport	3rd
2019	Italian Championship — OKJ		12th
2019	WSK Final Cup — OKJ	Rosberg Racing Academy	9th
2020	WSK Champions Cup — OKJ	Rosberg Racing Academy	2nd
2020	WSK Super Master Series — OKJ	Rosberg Racing Academy	21st
2020	25° South Garda Winter Cup — OKJ	Rosberg Racing Academy	1st
2020	WSK Euro Series — OKJ	Rosberg Racing Academy	20th
2020	WSK Open Cup — OKJ	Leclerc by Lennox Racing	4th
2021	WSK Champions Cup — OK	Leclerc by Lennox Racing	13th
2021	CIK-FIA European Championship — OK	Leclerc by Lennox Racing	12th
2021	FIA Karting World Championship – OK	Leclerc by Lennox Racing	20th
2021	WSK Super Master Series — OK	Leclerc by Lennox Racing	20th
2021	WSK Euro Series — OK	Leclerc by Lennox Racing	10th
2021	Champions of the Future — OK	Leclerc by Lennox Racing	10th
2021	WSK Open Cup – OK	Leclerc by Lennox Racing	49th
2024	WSK Final Cup – KZ2	Birel ART Racing Srl	4th

== Racing record ==
=== Racing career summary ===
Season	Series	Team	Races	Wins	Poles	F/Laps	Podiums	Points	Position
2022	Formula 4 UAE Championship	3Y by R-ace GP	19	0	0	0	1	72	10th
2022	Italian F4 Championship	Van Amersfoort Racing	20	0	0	0	2	122	7th
2022	ADAC Formula 4 Championship	Van Amersfoort Racing	6	0	0	0	0	0	NC†
2022	F4 Spanish Championship	Monlau Motorsport	3	0	0	0	0	22	17th
2023	Formula Regional Middle East Championship	R-ace GP	9	0	0	0	0	20	18th
2023	Formula Regional European Championship	R-ace GP	20	5	3	3	11	261	**2nd**
2023	Macau Formula 4 Race	Pinnacle Motorsport	2	0	0	0	0	N/A	DNF
2024	Formula Regional Middle East Championship	R-ace GP	9	0	0	2	4	100	8th
2024	FIA Formula 3 Championship	Hitech Pulse-Eight	18	1	0	2	2	38	18th
2024	GB3 Championship	Chris Dittmann Racing	2	0	0	0	0	19	27th
2025	FIA Formula 3 Championship	Hitech TGR	19	2	0	3	5	89	5th
2025	FIA Formula 2 Championship	Trident	2	0	0	0	0	2	20th
2025	FIA Formula 2 Championship	Rodin Motorsport	4	0	0	0	0	2	20th
2026	FIA Formula 2 Championship	Rodin Motorsport	8	1	0	1	2	48	**3rd***

* Season still in progress.
^{†} As Stenshorne was a guest driver, he was ineligible for championship points.

=== Complete Formula 4 UAE Championship results ===
(key) (Races in bold indicate pole position) (Races in italics indicate fastest lap)

Year	Team	1	2	3	4	5	6	7	8	9	10	11	12	13	14	15	16	17	18	19	20	Pos	Points
2022	3Y by R-ace GP	YMC1; 1; 7	YMC1; 2 Ret	YMC1; 3 Ret	YMC1; 4; 16	DUB1; 1; 5	DUB1; 2 DNS	DUB1; 3; 12	DUB1; 4; 2	DUB2; 1; 5	DUB2; 2 Ret	DUB2; 3; 9	DUB2; 4; 4	DUB3; 1; 6	DUB3; 2; 8	DUB3; 3; 13	DUB3; 4; 17	YMC2; 1 Ret	YMC2; 2; 9	YMC2; 3; 14	YMC2; 4; 11	10th	72

=== Complete Italian F4 Championship results ===
(key) (Races in bold indicate pole position) (Races in italics indicate fastest lap)

Year	Team	1	2	3	4	5	6	7	8	9	10	11	12	13	14	15	16	17	18	19	20	21	22	DC	Points
2022	Van Amersfoort Racing	IMO; 1; 5	IMO; 2; 5	IMO; 3; 5	MIS; 1 Ret	MIS; 2; 7	MIS; 3; 6	SPA; 1 Ret	SPA; 2; 11	SPA; 3; 8	VLL; 1; 10	VLL; 2; 10	VLL; 3; 9	RBR; 1; 6	RBR; 2	RBR; 3; 4	RBR; 4; 8	MNZ; 1; 29†	MNZ; 2; 3	MNZ; 3 C	MUG; 1; 3	MUG; 2; 8	MUG; 3; 4	7th	122

=== Complete ADAC Formula 4 Championship results ===
(key) (Races in bold indicate pole position) (Races in italics indicate fastest lap)

Year	Team	1	2	3	4	5	6	7	8	9	10	11	12	13	14	15	16	17	18	DC	Points
2022	Van Amersfoort Racing	SPA; 1	SPA; 2	SPA; 3	HOC; 1; 5	HOC; 2; 5	HOC; 3; 7	ZAN; 1; 8	ZAN; 2; 10	ZAN; 3; 8	NÜR1; 1	NÜR1; 2	NÜR1; 3	LAU; 1	LAU; 2	LAU; 3	NÜR2; 1	NÜR2; 2	NÜR2; 3	NC†	0

^{†} As Stenshorne was a guest driver, he was ineligible to score points.

=== Complete F4 Spanish Championship results ===
(key) (Races in bold indicate pole position) (Races in italics indicate fastest lap)

Year	Team	1	2	3	4	5	6	7	8	9	10	11	12	13	14	15	16	17	18	19	20	21	DC	Points
2022	Monlau Motorsport	ALG; 1	ALG; 2	ALG; 3	JER; 1	JER; 2	JER; 3	CRT; 1	CRT; 2	CRT; 3	SPA; 1	SPA; 2	SPA; 3	ARA; 1; 6	ARA; 2; 5	ARA; 3; 6	NAV; 1	NAV; 2	NAV; 3	CAT; 1	CAT; 2	CAT; 3	17th	22

=== Complete Formula Regional Middle East Championship results ===
(key) (Races in bold indicate pole position) (Races in italics indicate fastest lap)

Year	Entrant	1	2	3	4	5	6	7	8	9	10	11	12	13	14	15	DC	Points
2023	R-ace GP	DUB1; 1	DUB1; 2	DUB1; 3	KUW1; 1	KUW1; 2	KUW1; 3	KUW2; 1; 13	KUW2; 2; 11	KUW2; 3; 8	DUB2; 1; 15	DUB2; 2; 9	DUB2; 3; 21†	ABU; 1; 11	ABU; 2; 7	ABU; 3; 6	18th	20
2024	R-ace GP	YMC1; 1; 3	YMC1; 2; 3	YMC1; 3; 2	YMC2; 1; 2	YMC2; 2; 5	YMC2; 3; 4	DUB1; 1; 5	DUB1; 2; 9	DUB1; 3; 19	YMC3; 1	YMC3; 2	YMC3; 3	DUB2; 1	DUB2; 2	DUB2; 3	8th	100

=== Complete Formula Regional European Championship results ===
(key) (Races in bold indicate pole position) (Races in italics indicate fastest lap)

Year	Team	1	2	3	4	5	6	7	8	9	10	11	12	13	14	15	16	17	18	19	20	DC	Points
2023	R-ace GP	**IMO**; **1**; 1	IMO; 2; 2	CAT; 1; 7	CAT; 2; 12	**HUN**; **1**; 1	HUN; 2; 1	SPA; 1; 3	SPA; 2; 17	**MUG**; **1**; 1	MUG; 2; 3	LEC; 1; 3	LEC; 2; 4	RBR; 1; 18	RBR; 2; 17	MNZ; 1; 3	MNZ; 2 Ret	ZAN; 1; 4	ZAN; 2; 6	HOC; 1; 2	HOC; 2; 1	2nd	261

=== Complete Formula 4 South East Asia Championship results ===
(key) (Races in bold indicate pole position; races in italics indicate fastest lap)

Year	Entrant	1	2	3	4	5	6	7	8	9	10	11	Pos	Points
2023	Pinnacle Motorsport	ZZIC1; 1	ZZIC1; 2	ZZIC1; 3	MAC; 1 NC	MAC; 2 Ret	SEP1; 1	SEP1; 2	SEP1; 3	SEP2; 1	SEP2; 2	SEP2; 3	NC†	0

=== Complete FIA Formula 3 Championship results ===
(key) (Races in bold indicate pole position) (Races in italics indicate fastest lap)

Year	Entrant	1	2	3	4	5	6	7	8	9	10	11	12	13	14	15	16	17	18	19	20	DC	Points
2024	Hitech Pulse-Eight	BHR; SPR; 11	BHR; FEA; 14	MEL; SPR; 1	MEL; FEA; 26	IMO; SPR; 22	IMO; FEA; 14	MON; SPR; 16	MON; FEA; 26	CAT; SPR; 4	CAT; FEA; 27	RBR; SPR; 2	RBR; FEA; 12	SIL; SPR	SIL; FEA	HUN; SPR; 13	HUN; FEA; 13	SPA; SPR; 18	SPA; FEA; Ret	MNZ; SPR; 10	MNZ; FEA; 5	18th	38
2025	Hitech TGR	MEL; SPR; 2	MEL; FEA; 8	BHR; SPR; 5	BHR; FEA; 18	IMO; SPR; 13	IMO; FEA; 11	MON; SPR; 1	MON; FEA; 8	CAT; SPR; Ret	CAT; FEA; 9	RBR; SPR; 7	RBR; FEA; 1	SIL; SPR; 2	SIL; FEA; 17	SPA; SPR; 7	SPA; FEA; C	HUN; SPR; 22	HUN; FEA; 26	MNZ; SPR; 2	MNZ; FEA; 21	5th	89

=== Complete GB3 Championship results ===
(key) (Races in bold indicate pole position) (Races in italics indicate fastest lap)

Year	Team	1	2	3	4	5	6	7	8	9	10	11	12	13	14	15	16	17	18	19	20	21	22	23	24	DC	Points
2024	Chris Dittmann Racing	OUL; 1	OUL; 2	OUL; 3	SIL1; 1; 9	SIL1; 2; 14	SIL1; 3 C	SPA; 1	SPA; 2	SPA; 3	HUN; 1	HUN; 2	HUN; 3	ZAN; 1	ZAN; 2	ZAN; 3	SIL2; 1	SIL2; 2	SIL2; 3	DON; 1	DON; 2	DON; 3	BRH; 1	BRH; 2	BRH; 3	27th	19

=== Complete FIA Formula 2 Championship results ===
(key) (Races in bold indicate pole position) (Races in italics indicate fastest lap)

Year	Entrant	1	2	3	4	5	6	7	8	9	10	11	12	13	14	15	16	17	18	19	20	21	22	23	24	25	26	27	28	29	DC	Points
2025	Trident	MEL; SPR	MEL; FEA	BHR; SPR	BHR; FEA	JED; SPR	JED; FEA	IMO; SPR	IMO; FEA	MON; SPR	MON; FEA	CAT; SPR	CAT; FEA	RBR; SPR	RBR; FEA	SIL; SPR	SIL; FEA	SPA; SPR	SPA; FEA	HUN; SPR	HUN; FEA	MNZ; SPR	MNZ; FEA	BAK; SPR; Ret	BAK; FEA; Ret						20th	2
2025	Rodin Motorsport																									LSL; SPR; 7	LSL; FEA; 15	YMC; SPR; 21†	YMC; FEA; 15		20th	2
2026	Rodin Motorsport	MEL; SPR; 10	MEL; FEA; Ret	MIA; SPR; 6	MIA; FEA; Ret	MTL; SPR; 3	MTL; FEA; 1	MON; SPR; 6	MON; FEA; 5	CAT; SPR; 18	CAT; FEA; 17	RBR; SPR; 14	RBR; FEA; 19	SIL; SPR; 20	SIL; FEA; DNS	SPA; SPR; 2	SPA; FEA; 10	HUN; SPR; 8	HUN; FEA; 21	MNZ; SPR; 6	MNZ; FEA; 15	MAD; SPR; 5	MAD; FEA; 8	BAK; SPR; 4	BAK; FEA1; 2	**BAK**; **FEA2**; 4	LSL; SPR	LSL; FEA	YMC; SPR	YMC; FEA	7th*	107*

* Season still in progress.
