= 2023 Formula Regional European Championship =

Motor racing competition

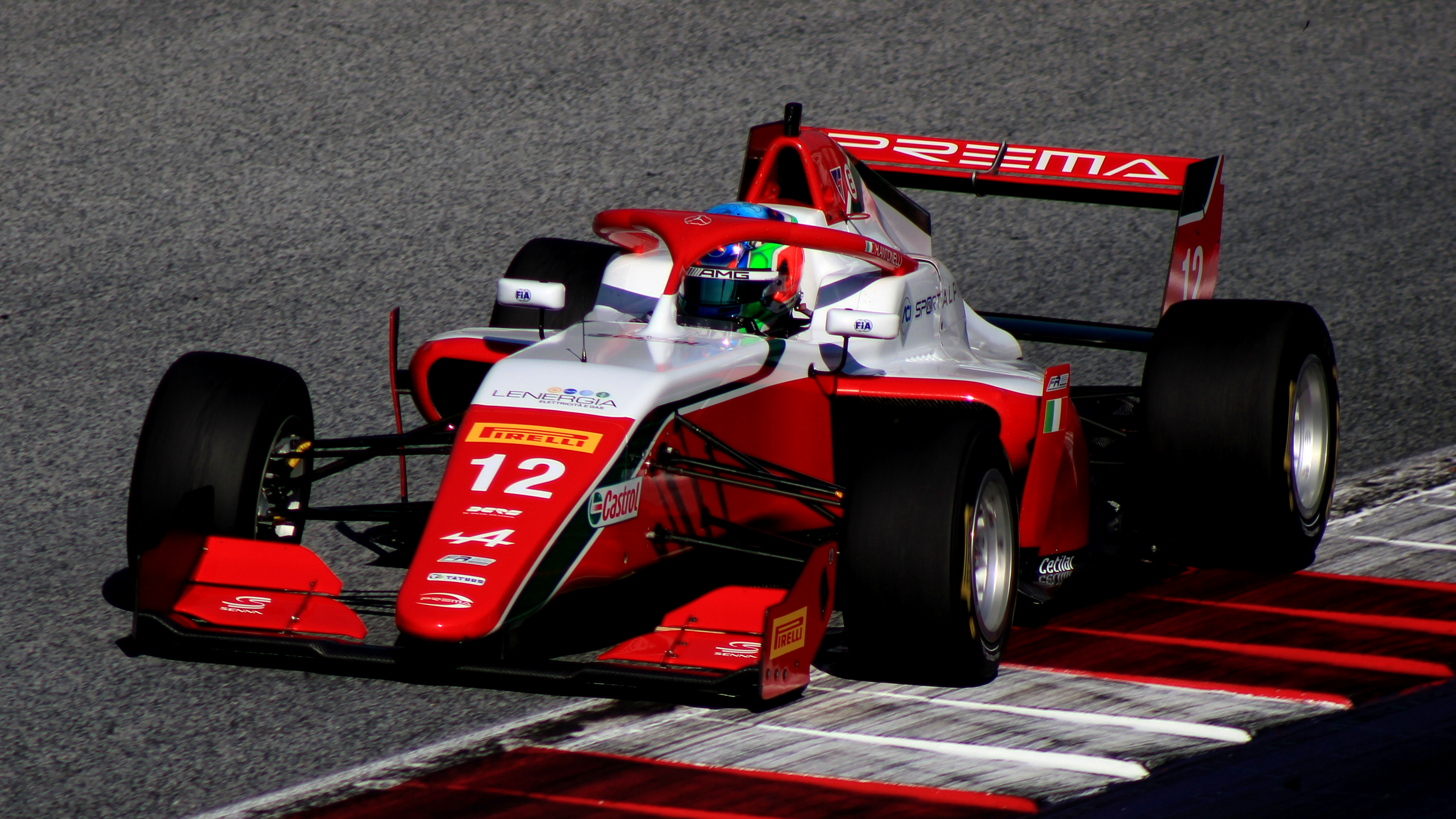
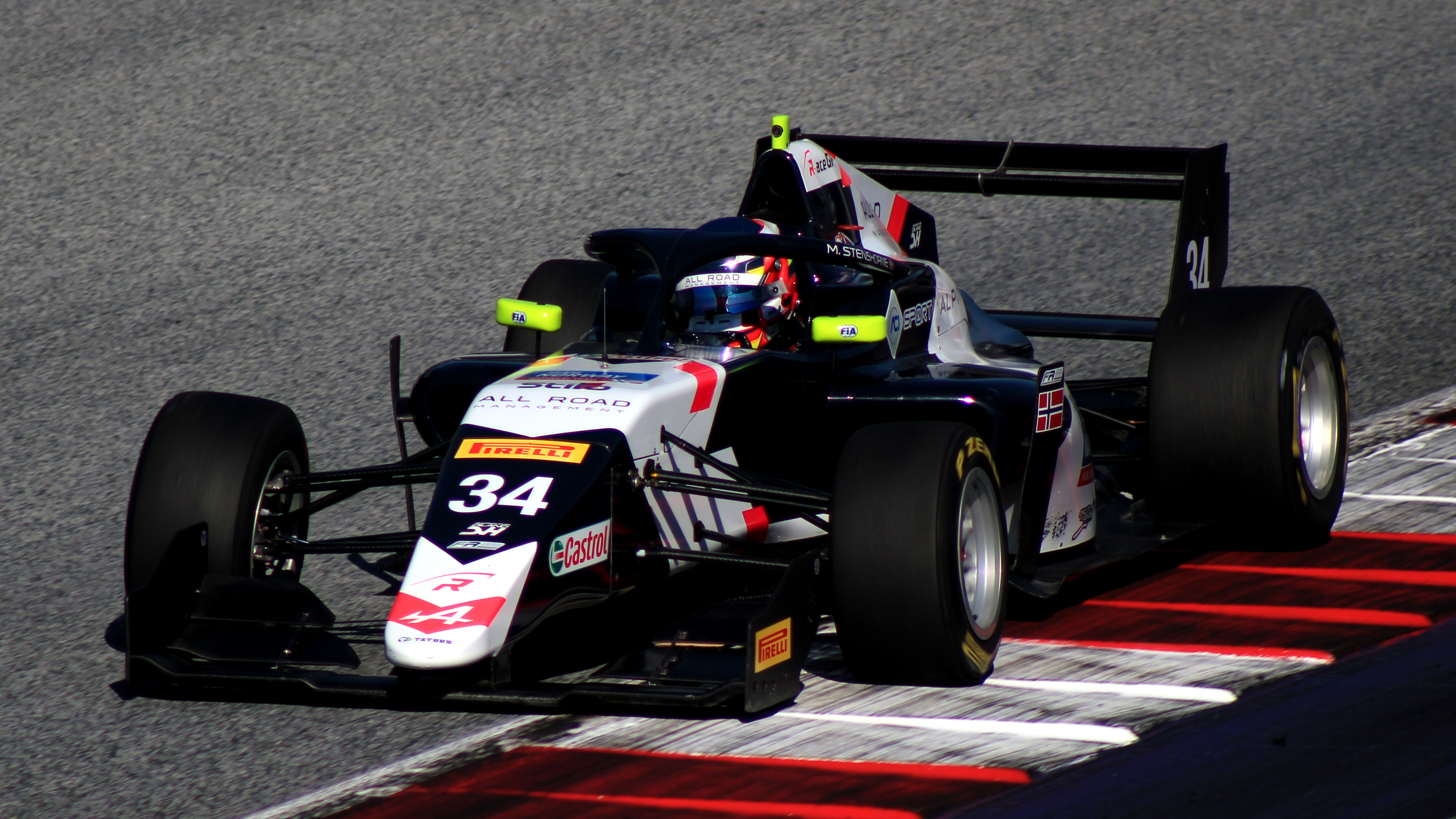
Prema's Andrea Kimi Antonelli, secured the Drivers' Championship with two races to spare; R-ace GP's Martinius Stenshorne won the Rookie Championship.

The 2023 Formula Regional European Championship by Alpine was a multi-event, Formula Regional open-wheel single seater motor racing championship held across Europe. The championship featured a mix of professional and amateur drivers, competing in Formula Regional cars that conform to the FIA Formula Regional regulations for the championship. This was the fifth season of the championship and the third after a merger with Formula Renault Eurocup which resulted to the change of the engine supplier to Alpine.

Andrea Kimi Antonelli, driving for Prema Racing, won the Drivers' Championship with two races to spare. His team clinched the Teams' Championship at the final race by only two points. Martinius Stenshorne, driving for R-ace GP, won the Rookie Championship.

The season was marred by the death of Dutch driver Dilano van 't Hoff during the second race of the Spa-Francorchamps round.

== Teams and drivers ==
Twelve teams were pre-selected by the championship organizers on 2 December 2022. The rule that allowed teams to only enter a fourth car for female drivers was dropped.

| Teams | No. | Driver | Status | Rounds |
|---|---|---|---|---|
| (France) ART Grand Prix | 2 | (France) Hadrien David | G | 4 |
| (France) ART Grand Prix | 9 | (Austria) Charlie Wurz | | 1–3, 5–6 |
| (France) ART Grand Prix | 9 | (France) Evan Giltaire | R G | 9–10 |
| (France) ART Grand Prix | 18 | (Netherlands) Laurens van Hoepen | | All |
| (France) ART Grand Prix | 25 | (France) Marcus Amand | R | All |
| (Switzerland) G4 Racing | 3 | (France) Alessandro Giusti | R | All |
| (Switzerland) G4 Racing | 28 | (France) Pierre-Alexandre Provost | R | 6–10 |
| (Switzerland) G4 Racing | 30 | (Kyrgyzstan) Michael Belov (Note: Belov and Smal are Russian, but they compete under a Kyrgyz licence as Russian national emblems were banned by the FIA following the Russian invasion of Ukraine. Bedrin, also a Russian, competes under an Italian licence for the same reason.) | | 1–8 |
| (Switzerland) G4 Racing | 30 | (Argentina) Juan Francisco Soldavini | R G | 9–10 |
| (Italy) Trident | 4 | (Poland) Roman Biliński | | All |
| (Italy) Trident | 43 | (France) Owen Tangavelou (Note: Tangavelou is a Vietnamese driver who competed under a French licence.) | | All |
| (Italy) Trident | 47 | (Singapore) Nikhil Bohra (Note: Bohra is an American-Indian driver competing under a Singaporean licence.) | | All |
| (United Kingdom) Arden Motorsport | 5 | (United Kingdom) Tom Lebbon | R | All |
| (United Kingdom) Arden Motorsport | 10 | (Paraguay) Joshua Dürksen | | All |
| (United Kingdom) Arden Motorsport | 11 | (Hungary) Levente Révész | | 1–8 |
| (France) Saintéloc Racing | 6 | (Colombia) Lucas Medina | R | 1 |
| (France) Saintéloc Racing | 33 | (Colombia) Lucas Medina | R | 2–6 |
| (France) Saintéloc Racing | 33 | (Poland) Tymek Kucharczyk | G | 8 |
| (France) Saintéloc Racing | 19 | (France) Esteban Masson | | 3–4, 6–8, 10 |
| (France) Saintéloc Racing | 19 | (France) Pierre-Louis Chovet | G | 9 |
| (France) Saintéloc Racing | 73 | (Brazil) Emerson Fittipaldi Jr. | R | All |
| (Italy) Prema Racing | 7 | (Spain) Lorenzo Fluxá | | All |
| (Italy) Prema Racing | 8 | (Brazil) Rafael Câmara | | All |
| (Italy) Prema Racing | 12 | (Italy) Kimi Antonelli | | All |
| (Netherlands) Van Amersfoort Racing | 13 | (Switzerland) Joshua Dufek | | 1–6 |
| (Netherlands) Van Amersfoort Racing | 13 | (Mexico) Jesse Carrasquedo Jr. | R | 7–8 |
| (Netherlands) Van Amersfoort Racing | 13 | (Portugal) Ivan Domingues | R G | 9–10 |
| (Netherlands) Van Amersfoort Racing | 27 | (Netherlands) Kas Haverkort | | All |
| (Netherlands) Van Amersfoort Racing | 68 | (Netherlands) Niels Koolen | | 1–9 |
| (Netherlands) Van Amersfoort Racing | 68 | (Italy) Nikita Bedrin | G | 10 |
| (Netherlands) MP Motorsport | 14 | (Spain) Bruno del Pino | | 7 |
| (Netherlands) MP Motorsport | 14 | (Spain) Javier Sagrera | G | 9–10 |
| (Netherlands) MP Motorsport | 15 | (France) Sami Meguetounif | | 1–4, 6–10 |
| (Netherlands) MP Motorsport | 17 | (Netherlands) Dilano van 't Hoff | | 1–4 |
| (Netherlands) MP Motorsport | 26 | (France) Victor Bernier | | 1–4, 6–10 |
| (Italy) Monolite Racing | 21 | (Kyrgyzstan) Kirill Smal | R | 2–6 |
| (Italy) Monolite Racing | 21 | (France) Hadrien David | | 7–8 |
| (Italy) Monolite Racing | 21 | (Italy) Nikita Bedrin | G | 9 |
| (Italy) Monolite Racing | 21 | (Germany) Valentin Kluss | R G | 10 |
| (Italy) Monolite Racing | 29 | (United States) Enzo Scionti | | 1–6, 8–10 |
| (Italy) Monolite Racing | 99 | (Italy) Giovanni Maschio | | All |
| (Finland) KIC Motorsport | 23 | (Ukraine) Oleksandr Partyshev | R | 1–4 |
| (Finland) KIC Motorsport | 23 | (Finland) Konsta Lappalainen | | 5 |
| (Finland) KIC Motorsport | 23 | (Ukraine) Ivan Klymenko | R | 6–10 |
| (Finland) KIC Motorsport | 55 | (Switzerland) Shannon Lugassy | R | 1–2 |
| (Finland) KIC Motorsport | 55 | (Sweden) William Karlsson | R | 7–8 |
| (Finland) KIC Motorsport | 64 | (Netherlands) Maya Weug (Note: Weug is a Dutch-Belgian-Spanish driver who competed under a Spanish licence in rounds 1–8 and a Dutch licence in rounds 9–10.) | R F | All |
| (France) R-ace GP | 34 | (Norway) Martinius Stenshorne | R | All |
| (France) R-ace GP | 77 | (Germany) Tim Tramnitz | | All |
| (France) R-ace GP | 88 | (Peru) Matías Zagazeta | | All |
| (Italy) RPM | 57 | (Denmark) Noah Strømsted | R G | 8, 10 |
| (Italy) RPM | 65 | (Mexico) Santiago Ramos | | All |
| (Italy) RPM | 75 | (Republic of Ireland) Adam Fitzgerald | R | 1–4 |
| (Italy) RPM | 85 | (France) Macéo Capietto | | All |

| Icon | Status |
|---|---|
| R | Rookie |
| F | Female |
| G | Guest drivers ineligible for points |

- Nicolás Baptiste was expected to join Saintéloc Racing to tackle his second season in the championship after failing to score points with FA Racing in 2022, but did not enter any rounds.
- Iker Oikarinen was announced to join KIC Motorsport, but did not compete in any rounds.

=== Team changes ===
FA Racing by MP announced their departure from the championship in October 2022. The entry was taken over by French team Saintéloc Racing.

=== Driver changes ===
Reigning team champions Prema Racing renewed their line-up completely, as all their 2022 full-time drivers were promoted to Formula 3, with champion Dino Beganovic and Paul Aron staying with the Italian team and Sebastian Montoya joining Hitech Pulse-Eight. Replacing them were the 2022 Italian F4 and ADAC F4 champion Andrea Kimi Antonelli, Rafael Câmara and third-year FRECA driver Lorenzo Fluxá. All three raced for Prema's partner team Mumbai Falcons in the 2023 Formula Regional Middle East Championship, with Antonelli taking the title.

Vice-champion team R-ace GP recruited Tim Tramnitz, who departed Trident after coming 15th with the team in his debut season. He replaced Lorenzo Fluxá, who joined Prema Racing. The team signed another second-year driver in Matías Zagazeta, who failed to score points in his rookie year with G4 Racing, to replace Gabriel Bortoleto, who graduated to F3 with Trident. Their lineup was completed by Martinius Stenshorne, who made appearances in four different Formula 4 series in 2022, with a seventh in the Italian Championship as his best result.

2022 Formula 4 UAE and 2023 Formula Regional Oceania champion Charlie Wurz joined ART Grand Prix, replacing Gabriele Minì, who graduated to FIA Formula 3 with Hitech Pulse-Eight. The team also signed Sauber Academy driver Marcus Amand, who graduated from Formula 4, to replace Esteban Masson.

Van Amersfoort Racing replaced Arden-bound Levente Révész with Niels Koolen, who also competed with the team in the 2023 Formula Regional Middle East Championship.

Trident recruited Owen Tangavelou, who raced with G4 Racing and Race Performance Motorsport in 2022, finishing 20th in the championship. He replaced Leonardo Fornaroli, who graduated to the Italian outfit's Formula 3 team after winning the rookie title in 2022. Nikhil Bohra replaced Tim Tramnitz to complete Trident's line-up after a successful Formula Regional debut in the 2023 Formula Regional Middle East Championship, where he finished 9th overall.

MP Motorsport signed Victor Bernier, who started his second season in the championship after a 17th-place finish in the 2022 season driving for MP's former partner team FA Racing.

Levente Révész made the switch from Van Amersfoort Racing to Arden for his second FRECA season, replacing Noel León, who moved across to the Euroformula Open championship. Arden's driver roster was completed by Tom Lebbon, 2020 Ginetta Junior champion and third in GB3 in 2022, who replaced Dudu Barrichello.

RPM promoted Irish driver Adam Fitzgerald from the F4 British Championship to replace the Trident-bound Owen Tangavelou. Santiago Ramos, who joined the team for the final round in 2022, raced there on a full-time basis in 2023. The teams' lineup was completed by Macéo Capietto, who moved over from Monolite Racing after a 22nd place in his rookie season. He replaced fellow Frenchman Pierre-Louis Chovet, who moved over to GT3 racing after three years in Formula Regional.

Monolite Racing fielded Giovanni Maschio, who graduated from the Italian F4 Championship, having also taken part in the 2023 Formula Regional Middle East Championship. Partnering him was Enzo Scionti, who last drove for Drivex in the 2021 Euroformula Open Championship where he came 14th.

2022 French F4 champion Alessandro Giusti made his Formula Regional debut in 2023, joining G4 Racing to replace Zagazeta. Partnering him and returning to the team was Michael Belov, who finished 7th in 2022 despite only completing half the season with MP Motorsport.

KIC Motorsport fielded an all-new, all-rookie line-up in 2023. Ferrari Academy driver Maya Weug jumped up to the Formula Regional level after two years in the Italian F4 Championship, replacing Santiago Ramos, who moved to RPM. Piotr Wiśnicki, who graduated to F3, was replaced by Ultimate Cup Series race winner Shannon Lugassy. The seat of Sebastian Ogaard, who moved to the newly created Eurocup-3 series, was originally to be filled by Formula Academy Finland race-winner Iker Oikarinen, before he was replaced by F4 racer Olexander Partyshev.

New entrant Saintéloc Racing signed Emerson Fittipaldi Jr., who made the step up to Formula Regional in 2023. Partnering him was Lucas Medina, a race winner in NACAM F4.

==== Mid-season changes ====
Kirill Smal joined Monolite Racing after the first round for a part-time campaign that lasted until round six, after making his Formula Regional Debut in the final three rounds of the inaugural Middle Eastern championship.

Esteban Masson joined Saintéloc Racing from round three onwards, except for the rounds at Mugello and Zandvoort. The French driver competed for FA Racing by MP and ART Grand Prix in 2022, scoring a single point. His main campaign in 2023 was the Eurocup-3 championship, where he drove for Campos Racing.

ART Grand Prix's Charlie Wurz was ruled out from competing in round four at Spa as he contracted laryngitis. At the same event, the team welcomed guest driver Hadrien David, who came fourth in 2022 with R-ace GP. Charlie Wurz returned to the championship from round five onwards.

After Dilano van 't Hoff lost his life in a crash during the second race at Spa, his team MP Motorsport did not enter any of their cars for the following round at Mugello. RPM driver Adam Fitzgerald, who suffered multiple broken bones in the accident, was also absent from round 5 onwards. At KIC Motorsport, Oleksandr Partyshev missed the round and was replaced by Konsta Lappalainen, who last competed in the series in 2021 and has been driving GT cars since.

Following KIC Motorsport's Oleksandr Partyshev's absence for the round at Mugello, he announced his retirement from racing, citing one of the main reasons to be due to Dilano van 't Hoff's death. His seat, filled by Lappalainen for round five, was filled by Ivan Klymenko, who therefore ended his TTE Formula Renault Cup campaign, for the remainder of the season.

Ahead of the round at Paul Ricard, G4 Racing announced that they would field a third car from that event on for French F4 driver Pierre-Alexandre Provost.

Charlie Wurz and Joshua Dufek, driving for ART Grand Prix and Van Amersfoort Racing respectively, switched to the Euroformula Open prior to round seven at the Red Bull Ring, where both series coincided. Jesse Carrasquedo Jr., stepping up from Spanish F4, replaced Dufek at VAR. Kirill Smal was absent from Monolite Racing, with Hadrien David rejoining the series to replace him. Both MP Motorsport and KIC Motorsport expanded back to three cars. They fielded Eurocup-3 competitors Bruno del Pino and William Karlsson respectively. Saintéloc Racing meanwhile only fielded two cars as Lucas Medina was absent. Shortly before the race weekend, Enzo Scionti announced his withdrawal from the round as he was recovering from a road accident.

Prior to the round at Monza, Saintéloc Racing announced that GB3 driver Tymek Kucharczyk would join the team for round eight. RPM also announced a new driver, with Spanish F4 driver Noah Strømsted joining the team for the round to make his debut.

Five drivers were announced to be making their series debut at the penultimate round: Francisco Soldavini for G4 Racing (replacing Michael Belov), Ivan Domingues for Van Amersfoort Racing (replacing Jesse Carrasquedo Jr.), newly crowned French F4 champion Evan Giltaire for ART Grand Prix (occupying the car previously driven by Charlie Wurz), Eurocup-3 driver Javier Sagrera for MP Motorsport (using Bruno del Pino's car) and F3 driver Nikita Bedrin at Monolite Racing to replace Hadrien David. Saintéloc Racing was another team that changed its lineup as it brought in Lamborghini junior and experienced Formula Regional driver Pierre-Louis Chovet in place of Esteban Masson. Levente Révész and William Karlsson left Arden and KIC Motorsport, but were not replaced.

Ahead of the season finale, Monolite Racing announced that Formula 4 driver Valentin Kluss would make his series debut, driving the car previously piloted by Smal, David and Bedrin. The latter meanwhile moved to Van Amersfoort Racing to replace Niels Koolen. Strømsted returned to RPM ahead of his 2024 campaign with the team.

== Race calendar ==
The calendar was revealed on 2 December 2022. Three pre-season tests were held at Barcelona, Paul Ricard and Monza in March and April. The championship visited Germany for the first time in its history, but did not support Formula One unlike in the years before.

| Round | | Circuit | Date | Supporting | Map of circuit locations |
|---|---|---|---|---|---|
| 1 | R1 | (Italy) Imola Circuit, Imola | 22 April | TCR Italy Touring Car Championship | 2023 Formula Regional European Championship is located in Europe |
| 1 | R2 | (Italy) Imola Circuit, Imola | 23 April | TCR Italy Touring Car Championship | 2023 Formula Regional European Championship is located in Europe |
| 2 | R1 | (Spain) Circuit de Barcelona-Catalunya, Montmeló | 20 May | 6H of Barcelona - Espíritu de Montjuïc | 2023 Formula Regional European Championship is located in Europe |
| 2 | R2 | (Spain) Circuit de Barcelona-Catalunya, Montmeló | 21 May | 6H of Barcelona - Espíritu de Montjuïc | 2023 Formula Regional European Championship is located in Europe |
| 3 | R1 | (Hungary) Hungaroring, Mogyoród | 17 June | International GT Open; TCR Europe Touring Car Series | 2023 Formula Regional European Championship is located in Europe |
| 3 | R2 | (Hungary) Hungaroring, Mogyoród | 18 June | International GT Open; TCR Europe Touring Car Series | 2023 Formula Regional European Championship is located in Europe |
| 4 | R1 | (Belgium) Circuit de Spa-Francorchamps, Stavelot | 30 June | GT World Challenge Europe Endurance Cup (Spa 24 Hours) | 2023 Formula Regional European Championship is located in Europe |
| 4 | R2 | (Belgium) Circuit de Spa-Francorchamps, Stavelot | 1 July | GT World Challenge Europe Endurance Cup (Spa 24 Hours) | 2023 Formula Regional European Championship is located in Europe |
| 5 | R1 | (Italy) Mugello Circuit, Scarperia e San Piero | 8 July | Italian GT Championship; Porsche Carrera Cup Italy | 2023 Formula Regional European Championship is located in Europe |
| 5 | R2 | (Italy) Mugello Circuit, Scarperia e San Piero | 9 July | Italian GT Championship; Porsche Carrera Cup Italy | 2023 Formula Regional European Championship is located in Europe |
| 6 | R1 | (France) Circuit Paul Ricard, Le Castellet | 22 July | International GT Open | 2023 Formula Regional European Championship is located in Europe |
| 6 | R2 | (France) Circuit Paul Ricard, Le Castellet | 23 July | International GT Open | 2023 Formula Regional European Championship is located in Europe |
| 7 | R1 | (Austria) Red Bull Ring, Spielberg | 9 September | International GT Open | 2023 Formula Regional European Championship is located in Europe |
| 7 | R2 | (Austria) Red Bull Ring, Spielberg | 10 September | International GT Open | 2023 Formula Regional European Championship is located in Europe |
| 8 | R1 | (Italy) Monza Circuit, Monza | 16 September | Italian GT Championship | 2023 Formula Regional European Championship is located in Europe |
| 8 | R2 | (Italy) Monza Circuit, Monza | 17 September | Italian GT Championship | 2023 Formula Regional European Championship is located in Europe |
| 9 | R1 | (Netherlands) Circuit Zandvoort, Zandvoort | 14 October | GT World Challenge Europe Sprint Cup | 2023 Formula Regional European Championship is located in Europe |
| 9 | R2 | (Netherlands) Circuit Zandvoort, Zandvoort | 15 October | GT World Challenge Europe Sprint Cup | 2023 Formula Regional European Championship is located in Europe |
| 10 | R1 | (Germany) Hockenheimring, Hockenheim | 21 October | Deutsche Tourenwagen Masters | 2023 Formula Regional European Championship is located in Europe |
| 10 | R2 | (Germany) Hockenheimring, Hockenheim | 22 October | Deutsche Tourenwagen Masters | 2023 Formula Regional European Championship is located in Europe |

== Race results ==
| Round | | Circuit | Pole position | Fastest lap | Winning driver | Winning team | Rookie winner |
|---|---|---|---|---|---|---|---|
| 1 | R1 | (Italy) Imola Circuit | (Norway) Martinius Stenshorne | (Norway) Martinius Stenshorne | (Norway) Martinius Stenshorne | (France) R-ace GP | (Norway) Martinius Stenshorne |
| 1 | R2 | (Italy) Imola Circuit | (Germany) Tim Tramnitz | (Netherlands) Kas Haverkort | (Netherlands) Kas Haverkort | (Netherlands) Van Amersfoort Racing | (Norway) Martinius Stenshorne |
| 2 | R1 | (Spain) Circuit de Barcelona-Catalunya | (Italy) Andrea Kimi Antonelli | (Italy) Andrea Kimi Antonelli | (Germany) Tim Tramnitz | (France) R-ace GP | (Norway) Martinius Stenshorne |
| 2 | R2 | (Spain) Circuit de Barcelona-Catalunya | (Germany) Tim Tramnitz | (Italy) Andrea Kimi Antonelli | (Germany) Tim Tramnitz | (France) R-ace GP | (Norway) Martinius Stenshorne |
| 3 | R1 | (Hungary) Hungaroring | (Norway) Martinius Stenshorne | (Mexico) Santiago Ramos | (Norway) Martinius Stenshorne | (France) R-ace GP | (Norway) Martinius Stenshorne |
| 3 | R2 | (Hungary) Hungaroring | (Switzerland) Joshua Dufek | (Norway) Martinius Stenshorne | (Norway) Martinius Stenshorne | (France) R-ace GP | (Norway) Martinius Stenshorne |
| 4 | R1 | (Belgium) Circuit de Spa-Francorchamps | (Brazil) Rafael Câmara | (Brazil) Rafael Câmara | (Brazil) Rafael Câmara | (Italy) Prema Racing | (Norway) Martinius Stenshorne |
| 4 | R2 | (Belgium) Circuit de Spa-Francorchamps | (Germany) Tim Tramnitz | (France) Sami Meguetounif | (Italy) Andrea Kimi Antonelli | (Italy) Prema Racing | (Netherlands) Maya Weug |
| 5 | R1 | (Italy) Mugello Circuit | (Norway) Martinius Stenshorne | (Norway) Martinius Stenshorne | (Norway) Martinius Stenshorne | (France) R-ace GP | (Norway) Martinius Stenshorne |
| 5 | R2 | (Italy) Mugello Circuit | (Italy) Andrea Kimi Antonelli | (Italy) Andrea Kimi Antonelli | (Italy) Andrea Kimi Antonelli | (Italy) Prema Racing | (Norway) Martinius Stenshorne |
| 6 | R1 | (France) Circuit Paul Ricard | (France) Alessandro Giusti | (France) Alessandro Giusti | (France) Alessandro Giusti | (Switzerland) G4 Racing | (France) Alessandro Giusti |
| 6 | R2 | (France) Circuit Paul Ricard | (Italy) Andrea Kimi Antonelli | (Italy) Andrea Kimi Antonelli | (Italy) Andrea Kimi Antonelli | (Italy) Prema Racing | (Norway) Martinius Stenshorne |
| 7 | R1 | (Austria) Red Bull Ring | (Brazil) Rafael Câmara | (France) Alessandro Giusti | (Brazil) Rafael Câmara | (Italy) Prema Racing | (France) Alessandro Giusti |
| 7 | R2 | (Austria) Red Bull Ring | (France) Alessandro Giusti | (France) Sami Meguetounif | (France) Alessandro Giusti | (Switzerland) G4 Racing | (France) Alessandro Giusti |
| 8 | R1 | (Italy) Monza Circuit | (Brazil) Rafael Câmara | (France) Alessandro Giusti | (France) Alessandro Giusti (Note: Andrea Kimi Antonelli crossed the line first, but received a 10-second time penalty for activating push-to-pass on the opening lap. Marcus Amand, who was second, also received a 10-second time penalty for forcing another driver off the track. Alessandro Giusti, having finished third on the track, inherited the win.) | (Switzerland) G4 Racing | (France) Alessandro Giusti |
| 8 | R2 | (Italy) Monza Circuit | (Italy) Andrea Kimi Antonelli | (Kyrgyzstan) Michael Belov | (Italy) Andrea Kimi Antonelli | (Italy) Prema Racing | (Denmark) Noah Strømsted |
| 9 | R1 | (Netherlands) Circuit Zandvoort | (Netherlands) Kas Haverkort (Note: Martinius Stenshorne recorded the fastest time in qualifying, but got a four-place grid penalty for causing a collision in the previous round. Kas Haverkort was recognised as the pole-sitter for the race.) | (Netherlands) Kas Haverkort | (Netherlands) Kas Haverkort | (Netherlands) Van Amersfoort Racing | (Norway) Martinius Stenshorne |
| 9 | R2 | (Netherlands) Circuit Zandvoort | (France) Marcus Amand | (Italy) Andrea Kimi Antonelli | (Italy) Andrea Kimi Antonelli | (Italy) Prema Racing | (France) Marcus Amand |
| 10 | R1 | (Germany) Hockenheimring | (Netherlands) Kas Haverkort | (Germany) Tim Tramnitz | (Germany) Tim Tramnitz | (France) R-ace GP | (Norway) Martinius Stenshorne |
| 10 | R2 | (Germany) Hockenheimring | (Germany) Tim Tramnitz | (Netherlands) Kas Haverkort | (Norway) Martinius Stenshorne | (France) R-ace GP | (Norway) Martinius Stenshorne |

== Season report ==
=== First half ===
The 2023 Formula Regional European Championship opened at Imola with R-ace GP's Martinius Stenshorne on pole position for the first race. He remained largely unbothered by three Prema cars running right on his tail, and managed the race through two safety car periods, up until a red flag for a crash between RPM's Adam Fitzgerald and Saintéloc's Lucas Medina ended the race early. The podium was completed by Prema pair Andrea Kimi Antonelli and Rafael Câmara. R-ace GP's Tim Tramnitz was on pole position for race two, while Fitzgerald had to withdraw after sustaining a back injury. VAR's Kas Haverkort overtook Tramnitz at the start, before two safety car periods interrupted the race. Stenshorne took second place on the restart afterwards, sending Tramnitz into the wall in the process and prompting another caution. One more incident brought the total number of retirements to nine and allowed Haverkort a comfortable win. Stenshorne in second claimed the championship lead, while Trident's Nikhil Bohra came third.

Antonelli and Tramnitz shared pole positions for the two races at Barcelona. The German started second for the first race and moved into the lead at the start. Haverkort slotted into third, before a red flag was thrown for a crash between MP Motorsport teammates Sami Meguetounif and Dilano van 't Hoff. The top three remained stable through the restart. Antonelli began attacking Tramnitz on lap twelve, but Tramnitz defended, before another safety car interruption ended the race under caution. Race two saw much of the same, with Tramnitz keeping the lead at the start and again leading Antonelli all race. Like the day before, Antonelli tried pressuring Tramnitz into a mistake, but to no avail. The two gapped the field, while behind them Meguetounif claimed third to bounce back from his retirement the day before. Tramnitz' double win allowed him to claim the championship lead by four points over Antonelli, while Stenshorne had a difficult weekend and dropped to fourth.

The Hungaroring brought Stenshorne back to the front with a pole position for race one. Antonelli drew alongside him at the start to take the lead. He kept it through a safety car period, before making a mistake and running off the track to allow Stenshorne back in front and give up the podium to Haverkort and RPM's Santiago Ramos. The Norwegian gratefully accepted the opportunity and took the win. VAR's Joshua Dufek claimed pole position for the second race, but it was a short-lived first place. Stenshorne had taken the lead by turn two, and Prema's Lorenzo Fluxá also went past the Swiss driver. Stenshorne managed his lead through three safety car interruptions, not allowing Fluxá any opportunity to attack him. He took the win to sweep the weekend and claim back the championship lead, now 29 points ahead of Antonelli, while this time it was Tramnitz' turn to have an off weekend and drop down to fourth. RPM's Macéo Capietto completed the podium after passing Dufek in the final part of the race.

Câmara and Tramnitz shared pole positions for the round at Spa. The latter attacked the former for the lead at the start of race one, but found no way past. This repeated itself at a safety car restart later on, but the outcome was no different. Stenshorne had a quiet race to finish third. The second race was held in wet conditions. Tramnitz held the lead at the start, while Antonelli moved into second past Ramos. The Italian took the lead on lap six and kept it through a safety car period. Tramnitz then spun around on the penultimate lap, but had his second place ahead of Arden's Joshua Dürksen reinstated when red flags flew shortly after and the race ended prematurely. Antonelli took his maiden win and shortened the points gap to five points, but it was not a day to celebrate: the multi-car crash that had caused the stoppage saw Fitzgerald collide with van 't Hoff's stricken car at the Kemmel Straight. This accident resulted in Fitzgerald breaking multiple bones and claimed the life of van 't Hoff.

Teams and drivers had little time to process what happened, as the round at Mugello happened only a week later. MP Motorsport and multiple other drivers did not enter the weekend. Stenshorne took pole position for the first race. Antonelli attacked him at the start, but could not get past, allowing the Norwegian to control the race. A restart with eight minutes remaining after Dürksen and Monolite's Kirill Smal came together gave another opportunity to Antonelli, but Stenshorne prevailed to lead the Italian and Tramnitz home. The second race saw Antonelli lead from pole position, before he had to contend with a safety car restart early on. Stenshorne moved into third before the interruption, behind Câmara, who was unable to attack Antonelli. Two more caution periods saw the top three positions remain unchanged. Ramos attacked Stenshorne on the final lap, leading to the pair crashing hard into the pitwall while crossing the finish line. The championship closed up even more, with Stenshorne now only two points ahead of Antonelli.

=== Second half ===
The second half of the championship began at Paul Ricard with a surprise home pole position for G4's Alessandro Giusti. Meguetounif moved into second past Stenshorne at the start, before the safety car was called. Tramnitz attacked Stenshorne heavily on the restart, but found no way past him onto the podium. Giusti in front was free to control his gap to the field as he took his maiden win unchallenged from behind. Antonelli could only manage fifth, but bounced back the next day to claim pole position for race two. He had a clean start, while Haverkort next to him bogged down to allow Saintéloc's part-timer Esteban Masson and Tramnitz through. Battles raged all through the field, but the situation at the top was stable. Antonelli managed the gap while Masson managed his tyres. Tramnitz closed up to Masson on the final lap and the pair battled through multiple corners, but Masson prevailed to keep second place. Antonelli's win handed him the championship lead by six points going into the summer break.

Teams and drivers then headed to Spielberg, where Câmara took pole position for the first race. He kept the lead at the start and was able to control the race from then onwards. Behind him, Tramnitz and Giusti fought over second place, with the Frenchman eventually coming out in front. He then closed up to Câmara and gapped the German, who came under pressure from Antonelli. But neither Antonelli nor Giusti could make a move, so the positions were unchanged at the finish line. Giusti then continued his run of form by taking pole position for race two. He resisted Antonelli at the start, before the latter was overtaken by Meguetounif. Giusti held on to win the race on his birthday. Antonelli dropped further down behind Stenshorne and finished fourth, before the Norwegian earned himself a post-race penalty for a starting procedure infringement. That lifted Antonelli back up to the podium and completed a pointless weekend to forget for Stenshorne who was now 33 points behind championship leader Antonelli.

Round eight of the season took place at Monza, and Câmara once again opened up the weekend with a pole position. ART's Marcus Amand took the lead at the start of the first race, while Antonelli battled past Câmara to second place and two laps later claimed the race lead. The pair held the top spots through three restarts, while Giusti took third. After the race, both Antonelli and Amand were penalized, handing the win to Giusti and allowing Stenshorne and MP's Victor Bernier onto the podium. Antonelli bounced back by taking pole position for the second race. He kept the lead at the start, while Câmara worked his way up from starting fourth to eventually end up second. He attacked Antonelli for two laps before a red flag was thrown for an incident between G4's Pierre-Alexandre Provost and Arden's Tom Lebbon. The race was not restarted, allowing Antonelli to hold on to the win, with Tramnitz third. Stenshorne had to retire from the race, losing further ground to Antonelli in the championship, with the Italian's lead now 43 points.

Haverkort began the penultimate race weekend at Zandvoort with a home pole position. He had a comfortable start as ART's Laurens van Hoepen lost second to Antonelli. The Italian then shadowed Haverkort for the rest of the race, but did not make a move as Haverkort converted his pole position into a home win for him and his team. Stenshorne started fourth and pressured van Hoepen all race, but could not find a way onto the podium. Rain hit the Dutch seaside for Sunday, and Marcus Amand took pole position as he judged the changing weather conditions best. Antonelli needed to outscore Stenshorne by two points to win the championship, and he did so in style: starting in eighth, he utterly dominated the race, claiming the lead after three laps and building a twelve-second gap over Amand despite a red flag mid-race for dangerously wet conditions. Van Hoepen made it two podiums out of two, while Stenshorne finished sixth. He was unable to do anything about Antonelli taking the title, 64 points in the lead.

The championship concluded at the Hockenheimring, and Haverkort and Tramnitz shared pole positions. Haverkort lost his lead in race one to Câmara, before both were overtaken by Tramnitz. Stenshorne was also on the move, slotting into third after a safety car. Câmara tried taking the lead in the final part of the race, but Tramnitz' stark defense saw the Brazilian lose ground and concede the podium to Stenshorne and Monolite's guest driver Nikita Bedrin. Tramnitz and Stenshorne were both in contention for second place going into the final race, but Stenshorne made his intentions clear at the start, moving past Tramnitz into the lead. Câmara also moved past Tramnitz, but once again completely lost his momentum when trying to go for the lead. This time it was Haverkort benefitting and getting onto the podium. Antonelli, who ran seventh, overtook Bohra on the final lap to help his Prema team win the Teams' Championship by two points over R-ace GP and end the season 39 points in the lead of the championship.

Antonelli came into the championship with huge expectations on his shoulders, and he delivered. While Stenshorne in second had the same amount of victories, once again consistency was key: Apart from a mechanical retirement and a penalty, Antonelli always finished in the top six. The Italian dedicated his fourth championship in two years to Dilano van 't Hoff, explaining that the weekend at Spa where the Dutch driver lost his life was a key point for his championship challenge, as he took his first win there and was able to build on that through the rest of the season.

== Championship standings ==
Points system

Points were awarded to the top 10 classified finishers.

| Position | **1st** | **2nd** | **3rd** | **4th** | **5th** | **6th** | **7th** | **8th** | **9th** | **10th** |
| Points | 25 | 18 | 15 | 12 | 10 | 8 | 6 | 4 | 2 | 1 |

=== Drivers' standings ===
| Pos. | Driver | IMO (Italy) | | CAT (Spain) | | HUN (Hungary) | | SPA (Belgium) | | MUG (Italy) | | LEC (France) | | RBR (Austria) | | MNZ (Italy) | | ZAN (Netherlands) | | HOC (Germany) | | Points |
| Pos. | Driver | R1 | R2 | R1 | R2 | R1 | R2 | R1 | R2 | R1 | R2 | R1 | R2 | R1 | R2 | R1 | R2 | R1 | R2 | R1 | R2 | Points |
|---|---|---|---|---|---|---|---|---|---|---|---|---|---|---|---|---|---|---|---|---|---|---|
| 1 | (Italy) Andrea Kimi Antonelli | 2 | Ret | **2** | 2 | 5 | 6 | 4 | 1 | 2 | **1** | 5 | **1** | 4 | 3 | 11 | **1** | 2 | 1 | 6 | 6 | 300 |
| 2 | (Norway) Martinius Stenshorne | **1** | 2 | 7 | 12 | **1** | 1 | 3 | 17 | **1** | 3 | 3 | 4 | 18 | 17 | 3 | Ret | 4 | 6 | 2 | 1 | 261 |
| 3 | (Germany) Tim Tramnitz | 6 | **Ret** | 1 | **1** | 8 | 16 | 2 | **2** | 3 | 7 | 4 | 3 | 3 | 12 | Ret | 3 | 6 | 4 | 1 | **2** | 239 |
| 4 | (Netherlands) Kas Haverkort | 5 | 1 | 3 | 13 | 2 | Ret | 12 | 7 | 4 | 5 | 12 | 11 | 5 | 7 | Ret | 7 | **1** | 14 | **5** | 3 | 174 |
| 5 | (Brazil) Rafael Câmara | 3 | Ret | 11 | 6 | 7 | 10 | **1** | 5 | 6 | 2 | 8 | 12 | **1** | Ret | **Ret** | 2 | 7 | Ret | 4 | 4 | 173 |
| 6 | (France) Alessandro Giusti | 7 | Ret | 13 | 17 | 14 | Ret | Ret | 13 | 10 | 12 | **1** | 5 | 2 | **1** | 1 | 18 | 11 | Ret | Ret | 17 | 111 |
| 7 | (Spain) Lorenzo Fluxá | 4 | Ret | 4 | 11 | 9 | 2 | 5 | 20 | 7 | Ret | 11 | Ret | 11 | 8 | 18 | 4 | 8 | 8 | 12 | 9 | 88 |
| 8 | (France) Macéo Capietto | Ret | 9 | 5 | 7 | 10 | 3 | 6 | 8 | 8 | 6 | 21 | 10 | 8 | 13 | Ret | 12 | 10 | 13 | 7 | 10 | 77 |
| 9 | (France) Sami Meguetounif | 17 | 22 | Ret | 3 | 11 | 7 | Ret | 9 | | | 2 | 14 | 6 | 2 | Ret | 10 | 12 | 9 | 13 | Ret | 75 |
| 10 | (Netherlands) Laurens van Hoepen | 11 | 12 | 10 | 9 | 13 | 5 | 19 | 16 | 16 | 22† | 6 | Ret | 17 | 20 | 7 | 5 | 3 | 3 | 9 | 18 | 71 |
| 11 | (Mexico) Santiago Ramos | 23 | 6 | Ret | 4 | 3 | 8 | 8 | 10 | 12 | 4 | Ret | 6 | 29 | Ret | 15 | 22 | WD | WD | 10 | DNS | 67 |
| 12 | (Singapore) Nikhil Bohra | 9 | 3 | 8 | 14 | Ret | 12 | 15 | 32 | 17 | 16 | 14 | Ret | 12 | 5 | 4 | 11 | 18 | Ret | 8 | 7 | 56 |
| 13 | (Switzerland) Joshua Dufek | 8 | Ret | 6 | 5 | 6 | **4** | 14 | 21 | 5 | 25 | 23 | 20 | | | | | | | | | 52 |
| 14 | (France) Owen Tangavelou | 16 | 13 | Ret | 16 | 18 | 13 | 23 | 22 | 13 | 8 | 15 | 8 | 10 | 6 | 5 | 8 | 17 | 17 | Ret | 5 | 43 |
| 15 | (France) Victor Bernier | 12 | 4 | 12 | 15 | 17 | 20 | 9 | 15 | | | 7 | 17 | 15 | 11 | 2 | 19 | Ret | 16 | 15 | 8 | 42 |
| 16 | (France) Esteban Masson | | | | | 15 | 11 | 17 | 11 | | | 13 | 2 | 13 | 4 | 6 | 16 | | | Ret | Ret | 39 |
| 17 | (Netherlands) Maya Weug | 20 | 14 | 20 | 24 | 19 | 25 | 7 | 6 | 9 | Ret | 10 | 7 | 19 | Ret | 9 | 13 | 19 | Ret | 18 | 21 | 27 |
| 18 | (France) Marcus Amand | 18 | 8 | 22 | 20 | 29 | 21 | 21 | 18 | 19 | 11 | 16 | 15 | 24 | Ret | 13 | 9 | 13 | **2** | 16 | Ret | 26 |
| 19 | (Paraguay) Joshua Dürksen | 15 | Ret | 18 | 21 | 20 | 14 | 10 | 3 | 14 | 23† | 18 | 9 | 16 | NC | 22 | Ret | 14 | 7 | 17 | 14 | 26 |
| 20 | (Kyrgyzstan) Michael Belov | 10 | Ret | 9 | 10 | 4 | 26† | 11 | 14 | 15 | 9 | 9 | 13 | 9 | 10 | Ret | 17 | | | | | 23 |
| 21 | (Poland) Roman Biliński | Ret | Ret | 15 | 8 | 12 | 17 | 13 | 24 | 11 | 15 | 20 | 16 | 7 | 9 | 16 | 14 | 5 | 19 | 11 | 12 | 23 |
| 22 | (Peru) Matías Zagazeta | 13 | 5 | 14 | 23 | 27 | Ret | 20 | 23 | 20 | 24† | 24 | 19 | 22 | 21 | 21 | 27 | 15 | 10 | Ret | 23 | 12 |
| 23 | (Netherlands) Dilano van 't Hoff | 14 | 7 | Ret | 22 | 23 | 9 | 30† | 19 | | | | | | | | | | | | | 8 |
| 24 | (Brazil) Emerson Fittipaldi Jr. | 19 | 17 | 19 | 26 | 30 | Ret | 26 | 28 | 22 | 14 | 22 | 21 | 30 | 19 | 8 | 21 | 23 | Ret | 25 | 24 | 4 |
| 25 | (Hungary) Levente Révész | 24 | 11 | 21 | 27 | 16 | 15 | 22 | 26 | Ret | 10 | 25 | Ret | 25 | 18 | 10 | 23 | | | | | 2 |
| 26 | (Austria) Charlie Wurz | 26 | 10 | 16 | 18 | 22 | 22 | | | 18 | 13 | Ret | 27 | | | | | | | | | 1 |
| 27 | (United Kingdom) Tom Lebbon | 30 | 23 | 27 | 25 | 25 | 23 | 18 | 31 | 21 | 20 | 17 | 22 | 14 | 15 | 12 | 32 | 20 | 18 | 21 | 22 | 0 |
| 28 | (Kyrgyzstan) Kirill Smal | | | 17 | 19 | 26 | 18 | Ret | 12 | Ret | Ret | 19 | 18 | | | | | | | | | 0 |
| 29 | (France) Hadrien David (Note: David was entered as a guest driver in round 4, so he was ineligible to score points.) | | | | | | | 16 | 4 | | | | | 20 | 14 | Ret | 15 | | | | | 0 |
| 30 | (France) Pierre-Alexandre Provost | | | | | | | | | | | 26 | Ret | 32 | Ret | 14 | 31 | DNS | Ret | 20 | 25 | 0 |
| 31 | (United States) Enzo Scionti | 25 | 15 | 23 | Ret | 32 | 24 | Ret | 27 | 25 | 21 | 29 | 24 | | | 24 | 30 | 27 | 21 | 26 | 20 | 0 |
| 32 | (Spain) Bruno del Pino | | | | | | | | | | | | | 21 | 16 | | | | | | | 0 |
| 33 | (Ukraine) Oleksandr Partyshev | Ret | 16 | Ret | Ret | 24 | Ret | 28 | Ret | | | | | | | | | | | | | 0 |
| 34 | (Italy) Giovanni Maschio | 28 | 21 | 25 | 30† | 31 | Ret | 24 | 29 | 27 | 17 | 27 | 25 | 31 | 22 | Ret | 29 | Ret | Ret | 23 | Ret | 0 |
| 35 | (Colombia) Lucas Medina | 27 | 18 | 28 | Ret | Ret | Ret | 27 | Ret | 26 | 19 | 30 | 23 | | | | | | | | | 0 |
| 36 | (Finland) Konsta Lappalainen | | | | | | | | | 23 | 18 | | | | | | | | | | | 0 |
| 37 | (Netherlands) Niels Koolen | 29 | 19 | 26 | 29 | 28 | Ret | 29 | 30 | 24 | Ret | Ret | 26 | 27 | 25 | 19 | 24 | 25 | 23 | | | 0 |
| 38 | (Republic of Ireland) Adam Fitzgerald | 22 | WD | 24 | 28 | 21 | 19 | 25 | 25 | | | | | | | | | | | | | 0 |
| 39 | (Switzerland) Shannon Lugassy | 21 | 20 | WD | WD | | | | | | | | | | | | | | | | | 0 |
| 40 | (Sweden) William Karlsson | | | | | | | | | | | | | 28 | 24 | 20 | 25 | | | | | 0 |
| 41 | (Ukraine) Ivan Klymenko | | | | | | | | | | | 28 | 28 | 26 | 23 | 23 | 26 | 24 | WD | 27 | Ret | 0 |
| 42 | (Mexico) Jesse Carrasquedo Jr. | | | | | | | | | | | | | 23 | 26 | Ret | 28 | | | | | 0 |
Guest drivers ineligible to score points
| — | (Italy) Nikita Bedrin | | | | | | | | | | | | | | | | | 9 | 5 | 3 | 11 | — |
| — | (Denmark) Noah Strømsted | | | | | | | | | | | | | | | Ret | 6 | | | 14 | 13 | — |
| — | (France) Evan Giltaire | | | | | | | | | | | | | | | | | 21 | 11 | 22 | 15 | — |
| — | (France) Pierre-Louis Chovet | | | | | | | | | | | | | | | | | 16 | 12 | | | — |
| — | (Spain) Javier Sagrera | | | | | | | | | | | | | | | | | 28 | 15 | 19 | Ret | — |
| — | (Portugal) Ivan Domingues | | | | | | | | | | | | | | | | | 22 | 20 | Ret | 16 | — |
| — | (Poland) Tymek Kucharczyk | | | | | | | | | | | | | | | 17 | 20 | | | | | — |
| — | (Germany) Valentin Kluss | | | | | | | | | | | | | | | | | | | Ret | 19 | — |
| — | (Argentina) Juan Francisco Soldavini | | | | | | | | | | | | | | | | | 26 | 22 | 24 | 26 | — |
| Pos. | Driver | R1 | R2 | R1 | R2 | R1 | R2 | R1 | R2 | R1 | R2 | R1 | R2 | R1 | R2 | R1 | R2 | R1 | R2 | R1 | R2 | Points |
| Pos. | Driver | IMO (Italy) | | CAT (Spain) | | HUN (Hungary) | | SPA (Belgium) | | MUG (Italy) | | LEC (France) | | RBR (Austria) | | MNZ (Italy) | | ZAN (Netherlands) | | HOC (Germany) | | Points |

| Colour | Result |
|---|---|
| Gold | Winner |
| Silver | Second place |
| Bronze | Third place |
| Green | Points classification |
| Blue | Non-points classification |
| Blue | Non-classified finish (NC) |
| Purple | Retired, not classified (Ret) |
| Red | Did not qualify (DNQ) |
| Red | Did not pre-qualify (DNPQ) |
| Black | Disqualified (DSQ) |
| White | Did not start (DNS) |
| White | Withdrew (WD) |
| White | Race cancelled (C) |
| Blank | Did not practice (DNP) |
| Blank | Did not arrive (DNA) |
| Blank | Excluded (EX) |

**Bold** – Pole

Italics – Fastest Lap

† — Did not finish, but classified

Rookie

=== Teams' standings ===
For teams entering more than two cars, only the two best-finishing cars were eligible to score points in the teams' championship.

| Pos. | Team | IMO (Italy) | | CAT (Spain) | | HUN (Hungary) | | SPA (Belgium) | | MUG (Italy) | | LEC (France) | | RBR (Austria) | | MNZ (Italy) | | ZAN (Netherlands) | | HOC (Germany) | | Points |
| Pos. | Team | R1 | R2 | R1 | R2 | R1 | R2 | R1 | R2 | R1 | R2 | R1 | R2 | R1 | R2 | R1 | R2 | R1 | R2 | R1 | R2 | Points |
|---|---|---|---|---|---|---|---|---|---|---|---|---|---|---|---|---|---|---|---|---|---|---|
| 1 | (Italy) Prema Racing | 2 | Ret | 2 | 2 | 5 | 2 | 1 | 1 | 2 | 1 | 5 | 1 | 1 | 3 | 11 | 1 | 2 | 1 | 4 | 4 | 512 |
| 1 | (Italy) Prema Racing | 3 | Ret | 4 | 6 | 7 | 7 | 4 | 5 | 6 | 2 | 8 | 12 | 4 | 8 | 18 | 2 | 7 | 8 | 6 | 6 | 512 |
| 2 | (France) R-ace GP | 1 | 2 | 1 | 1 | 1 | 1 | 2 | 2 | 1 | 3 | 3 | 3 | 3 | 12 | 3 | 3 | 4 | 4 | 1 | 1 | 510 |
| 2 | (France) R-ace GP | 6 | 5 | 7 | 12 | 8 | 17 | 3 | 17 | 3 | 7 | 4 | 4 | 18 | 17 | 21 | 27 | 6 | 6 | 2 | 2 | 510 |
| 3 | (Netherlands) Van Amersfoort Racing | 5 | 1 | 3 | 5 | 2 | 4 | 12 | 7 | 4 | 5 | 12 | 11 | 5 | 7 | 19 | 7 | 1 | 14 | 5 | 3 | 226 |
| 3 | (Netherlands) Van Amersfoort Racing | 8 | 21 | 6 | 13 | 6 | Ret | 14 | 21 | 5 | 25 | 23 | 20 | 23 | 25 | Ret | 24 | 22 | 23 | 3 | 11 | 226 |
| 4 | (Italy) RPM | 22 | 6 | 5 | 4 | 3 | 3 | 6 | 8 | 8 | 4 | 21 | 6 | 8 | 13 | 15 | 6 | 10 | 13 | 7 | 10 | 144 |
| 4 | (Italy) RPM | 23 | 9 | 24 | 7 | 10 | 8 | 8 | 10 | 12 | 6 | Ret | 10 | 29 | Ret | Ret | 13 | WD | WD | 10 | 13 | 144 |
| 5 | (Switzerland) G4 Racing | 7 | Ret | 9 | 10 | 4 | 26† | 11 | 13 | 10 | 9 | 1 | 5 | 2 | 1 | 1 | 17 | 11 | 22 | 20 | 17 | 134 |
| 5 | (Switzerland) G4 Racing | 10 | Ret | 13 | 17 | 14 | Ret | Ret | 14 | 15 | 12 | 9 | 13 | 9 | 10 | 14 | 18 | 26 | Ret | 24 | 25 | 134 |
| 6 | (Netherlands) MP Motorsport | 12 | 4 | 12 | 3 | 11 | 9 | 9 | 9 | | | 2 | 14 | 6 | 2 | 2 | 10 | 12 | 9 | 13 | 8 | 125 |
| 6 | (Netherlands) MP Motorsport | 14 | 7 | Ret | 15 | 17 | 10 | 30† | 15 | | | 7 | 17 | 15 | 11 | Ret | 19 | 28 | 15 | 15 | Ret | 125 |
| 7 | (Italy) Trident | 9 | 3 | 8 | 8 | 12 | 6 | 13 | 22 | 11 | 8 | 14 | 8 | 7 | 5 | 4 | 8 | 5 | 17 | 8 | 5 | 120 |
| 7 | (Italy) Trident | 16 | 15 | 15 | 14 | 18 | 13 | 15 | 24 | 13 | 15 | 15 | 16 | 10 | 6 | 5 | 11 | 17 | 19 | 11 | 7 | 120 |
| 8 | (France) ART Grand Prix | 11 | 8 | 10 | 9 | 13 | 5 | 16 | 4 | 16 | 11 | 6 | 15 | 17 | 20 | 7 | 5 | 3 | 2 | 9 | 15 | 98 |
| 8 | (France) ART Grand Prix | 18 | 10 | 16 | 18 | 22 | 21 | 19 | 16 | 18 | 13 | 16 | 27 | 24 | Ret | 13 | 9 | 13 | 3 | 16 | 18 | 98 |
| 9 | (France) Saintéloc Racing | 19 | 19 | 19 | 26 | 15 | 12 | 17 | 11 | 22 | 14 | 13 | 2 | 13 | 4 | 6 | 16 | 16 | 12 | 25 | 24 | 43 |
| 9 | (France) Saintéloc Racing | 27 | 20 | 28 | Ret | 30 | Ret | 26 | 28 | 26 | 19 | 22 | 21 | 30 | 19 | 8 | 20 | 23 | Ret | Ret | Ret | 43 |
| 10 | (United Kingdom) Arden Motorsport | 15 | 12 | 18 | 21 | 16 | 15 | 10 | 3 | 14 | 10 | 17 | 9 | 14 | 15 | 10 | 23 | 14 | 7 | 17 | 14 | 28 |
| 10 | (United Kingdom) Arden Motorsport | 24 | 13 | 21 | 25 | 20 | 16 | 18 | 26 | 21 | 20 | 18 | 22 | 16 | 18 | 12 | 32 | 20 | 18 | 21 | 22 | 28 |
| 11 | (Finland) KIC Motorsport | 20 | 16 | 20 | 24 | 19 | 25 | 7 | 6 | 9 | 18 | 10 | 7 | 19 | 23 | 9 | 13 | 19 | Ret | 18 | 21 | 27 |
| 11 | (Finland) KIC Motorsport | 21 | 18 | Ret | Ret | 24 | Ret | 28 | Ret | 23 | Ret | 28 | 28 | 26 | 24 | 20 | 25 | 24 | WD | 27 | Ret | 27 |
| 12 | (Italy) Monolite Racing | 25 | 17 | 17 | 19 | 26 | 18 | 24 | 12 | 25 | 17 | 19 | 18 | 20 | 14 | 24 | 15 | 9 | 5 | 23 | 19 | 0 |
| 12 | (Italy) Monolite Racing | 28 | 23 | 23 | 30† | 31 | 24 | Ret | 27 | 27 | 21 | 27 | 24 | 31 | 22 | Ret | 29 | 27 | 21 | 26 | 20 | 0 |
| Pos. | Team | R1 | R2 | R1 | R2 | R1 | R2 | R1 | R2 | R1 | R2 | R1 | R2 | R1 | R2 | R1 | R2 | R1 | R2 | R1 | R2 | Points |
| Pos. | Team | IMO (Italy) | | CAT (Spain) | | HUN (Hungary) | | SPA (Belgium) | | MUG (Italy) | | LEC (France) | | RBR (Austria) | | MNZ (Italy) | | ZAN (Netherlands) | | HOC (Germany) | | Points |
