= Lucas Medina =

Colombian racing driver (born 2003)

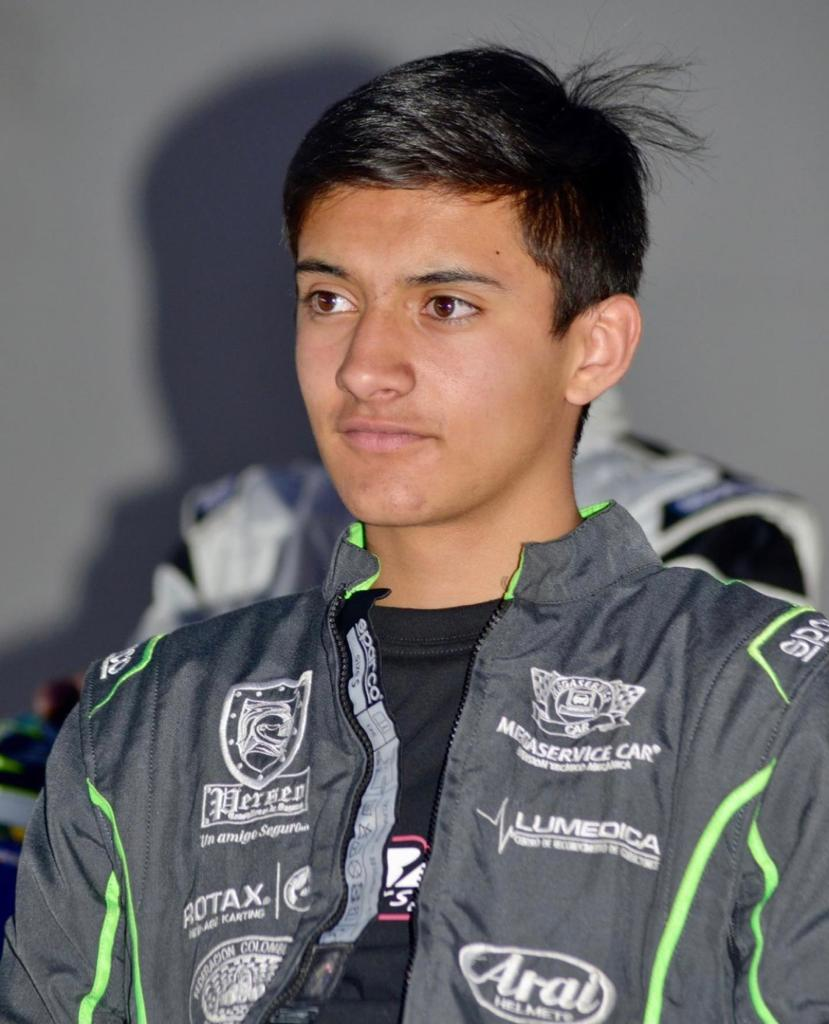
- Medina in 2021
- Nationality: (Colombia) Colombian
- Born: Lucas Medina Cristancho; 4 August 2003 (age 23) Bogotá, Colombia

Formula Regional European Championship career
- Debut season: 2023
- Current team: Saintéloc Racing
- Car number: 33
- Starts: 12 (12 entries)
- Wins: 0
- Podiums: 0
- Poles: 0
- Fastest laps: 0
- Best finish: 35th in 2023

Previous series
- 2021–2022 2011–18: NACAM Formula 4 Championship; Karting

Lucas Medina Cristancho (born 4 August 2003) is a Colombian racing driver who most recently competed in the Formula Regional European Championship for Saintéloc Racing. In 2019, he was recognized by the FIA as the best junior driver in the Americas.

== Career ==
=== Karting ===
Medina began his karting career in 2011 in the DPK category, winning two championships, 2012 and 2013. In 2012, he debuted in the Rotax Max Winter Cup championship where he scored a victory and a third place. In 2017, Medina placed fourth in the American South, this one in the Rotax Max challenge. In 2018, his last year in karting, he was crowned Pan American Champion in Rok Cup Colombia in the Shifter Rok category, leaving a good participation in the Rok's final.

=== Formula 4 ===
In 2021, Medina joined the NACAM Formula 4 Championship, with the Ram Racing team, where despite the fact that the season did not count points, he would score two victories and seven podiums in the season, achieving a symbolic second place, behind American racer Kory Enders. In 2022, Medina would be confirmed to contest the last round of the NACAM Formula 4 Championship, which was the support race for the 2022 Mexico City Grand Prix, in which he would achieve a pole position, but he could not consummate it in a victory or in a podium.

=== Formula Regional European Championship ===
At the end of 2022, Medina tested with Monolite Racing at the Red Bull Ring and Barcelona-Catalunya, achieving a time of 1:28:299 and 1:43:956s in these respective circuits. Months later, he would be confirmed by the French team Saintéloc Racing to compete in the 2023 Formula Regional European Championship.

== Racing record ==
=== Racing career summary ===
Season	Series	Team	Races	Wins	Poles	F/Laps	Podiums	Points	Position
2017	Camper Cross	N/A	?	?	?	?	?	?	2nd
2018	Monomarca	Mega Service car	7	4	5	5	6	?	1st
2018	Camper Cross	Mega Service car	1	1	1	1	1	?	1st
2018	Legends Stock Challenge	Mega Service car	4	3	4	4	4	?	1st
2018	6 Hours of Bogotá - Caterham Prototypes	Mega Service car	1	1	1	1	1	?	1st
2018–19	NACAM Formula 4 Championship		2	0	0	0	0	0	NC
2019	TC 2000	Mega Service car	7	2	1	2	3	?	3rd
2020	TC 2000	N/A	?	?	?	?	?	?	?
2021	TC 2000	N/A	?	?	?	?	?	?	?
2021	NACAM Formula 4 Championship	Ram Racing	10	2	1	2	7	0	NC
2021	NACAM Formula 4 - México City Grand Prix	Ram Racing	1	0	1	0	1	N/A	2nd
2022	Italian Prototype Championship	Bad Wolves	4	0	0	1	0	0	13th
2022	NACAM Formula 4 Championship	Ram Racing	2	0	1	1	0	10	17th
2023	Formula Regional European Championship	Saintéloc Racing	12	0	0	0	0	0	35th
2024	Ligier European Series - JS P4	Team Virage	2	0	0	0	1	19	13th
2025	Ligier European Series - JS P4	Team Virage	2	0	0	0	1	23	15th

^{*} Season still in progress.
